= Collection (Spyro Gyra album) =

Compilation album by Spyro Gyra
- Released: May 14, 1991
- Genre: Jazz fusion smooth jazz
- Label: GRP
- Producer: 68:36

Spyro Gyra chronology
Fast Forward (1990)	Collection (1991)	Three Wishes (1992)

Professional ratings
Review scores
Source	Rating
Allmusic	2/5 stars

Collection is the fifteenth and debut compilation album by Spyro Gyra, released in 1991 (see 1991 in music). The album cover showed a couple of fairies above a city with flowers.

The first two tracks are new recordings. "Mallet Ballet" is a live recording from a 1979 promo EP. "Harbor Nights" is from the live album Access All Areas. The remaining tracks are the original studio versions.

== Track listing and personnel ==
1. "You Can Count On Me" (Tom Schuman) - 3:27

- Jay Beckenstein: Saxophone, Wind Synthesizer
- Tom Schuman: Keyboards
- Dave Samuels: Vibes, marimba
- Julio Fernández: Guitars
- Oscar Cartaya: Bass
- Joel Rosenblatt: Drums
- Marc Quiñones: Percussion

2. "What Exit" (Julio Fernandez) - 3:40

- Jay Beckenstein: Saxophones
- Tom Schuman: Keyboards
- Dave Samuels: Marimba
- Julio Fernandez: Guitars
- Oscar Cartaya: Bass
- Joel Rosenblatt: Drums
- Marc Quiñones: Percussion

No Sweat Horns

- Barry Danelian: Trumpet, flugelhorn, horn section arrangement
- Randy Andos: Trombone
- Scott Kreitzer: Tenor Saxophone

3. "Nu Sungo" (Manolo Badrena) - 4:10

- Jay Beckenstein: Saxophones
- Tom Schuman: Keyboards
- Dave Samuels: Vibes, Marimba
- Julio Fernandez: Guitar
- Richie Morales: Drums
- Roberto Vally: Bass
- Manolo Badrena: Percussion

4. "The Unknown Soldier" (Jay Beckenstein) - 5:16

- Jay Beckenstein: Saxophone
- Tom Schuman: Keyboards
- Dave Samuels: Vibes, marimba, timpani
- Richie Morales: Drums
- Oscar Cartaya: Bass

5. "Morning Dance" (Jay Beckenstein) - 3:57

- Jay Beckenstein: Saxophones
- Jeremy Wall: Electric piano
- Dave Samuels: Marimba, steel drums
- John Tropea: Guitars
- Jim Kurzdorfer: Bass
- Ted Reinhardt: Drums
- Rubens Bassini: Percussion

6. "Old San Juan" (Jay Beckenstein) - 6:41

- Jay Beckenstein - Saxophone, whistle, percussion
- Dave Samuels - Marimba
- Jorge Dalto - Piano
- Rob Mounsey and Tom Schuman - Synthesizers
- Steve Love - Guitars
- Marcus Miller - Bass
- Steve Gadd - Drums
- Gerardo Velez - Percussion
- Manolo Badrena - Percussion

Horn Section:

- Jerry Hey - Horn arrangement, trumpet, flugelhorn
- Gary Grant - Trumpet, flugelhorn
- Tom Scott - Saxophone, flute
- Larry Williams - Saxophone, flute
- Bill Reichenbach - Trombone

7. "Shakedown" (Jeremy Wall) - 4:22

- Jay Beckenstein: Saxophone
- Tom Schuman: Keyboards
- Dave Samuels: Vibes, marimba
- Julio Fernandez: Guitars
- Richie Morales: Drums
- Kim Stone: Bass
- Gerardo Velez: Percussion

8. "Mallet Ballet" (Jeremy Wall) - 6:15

- Jay Beckenstein: Saxophone
- Tom Schuman: Keyboards
- Chet Catallo: Guitar
- Eli Konikoff: Drums
- Jim Kurzdorfer: Bass
- Gerardo Velez: Percussion

9. "Catching the Sun" (Jay Beckenstein) - 4:41

- Jay Beckenstein: Saxophone
- Tom Schuman: Electric piano, synthesizers
- Dave Samuels: Marimba, steel drums
- John Tropea - Guitar
- Hiram Bullock - Guitar
- Chet Catallo - Guitar
- Eli Konikoff - Drums
- Jim Kurzdorfer - Bass
- Jeremy Wall: Synthesizers
- Gerardo Velez - Percussion
- Rubens Bassini - Percussion
- Randy Brecker - Trumpet

10. "Para ti Latino" (Oscar Cartaya) - 4:15

- Jay Beckenstein - Saxophone
- Tom Schuman - Keyboards
- Dave Samuels - Vibes, marimba
- Jay Azzolina - Guitar
- Richie Morales - Drums
- Oscar Cartaya - Bass
- Marc Quiñones - Percussion

No Sweat Horns:

- Barry Danielian - Trumpet, flugelhorn, horn section arrangements
- Randy Andos - Trombone
- Scott Kreitzer - Tenor saxophone

11. "Incognito" (Tom Schuman) - 5:56

- Jay Beckenstein - Saxophone
- Tom Schuman - Keyboards
- Dave Samuels - Marimba
- Steve Love - Guitars
- Hiram Bullock - Guitars
- Rob Mounsey - Synthesizers, Vocorder
- Marcus Miller - Bass
- Steve Gadd - Drums
- Manolo Badrena - Percussion

12. "Harbor Nights" (Jay Beckenstein) - 6:52

- Jay Beckenstein - Saxophone
- Tom Schuman - Keyboards
- Dave Samuels - Vibes, marimba
- Eli Konikoff - Drums
- Kim Stone - Bass
- Chet Catallo - Guitar
- Gerardo Velez - Percussion

13. "Limelight" (Dave Samuels) - 4:27

- Jay Beckenstein - Saxophones
- Tom Schuman - Keyboards
- Dave Samuels - Vibes, Marimba
- Julio Fernandez - Guitars
- Richie Morales - Drums
- Oscar Cartaya - Bass

14. "Breakout: (Jeremy Wall) - 4:37

- Jay Beckenstein - Saxophone
- Tom Schuman - Keyboards
- Dave Samuels - Vibes, marimba
- Julio Fernandez - Guitar
- Richie Morales - Drums
- Kim Stone - Bass
- Manolo Badrena - Percussion
