= Road Scholars =

Live album by Spyro Gyra
- Released: March 24, 1998
- Recorded: 1997
- Genres: Jazz, smooth jazz
- Length: 50:25
- Label: GRP
- Producer: Jay Beckenstein

Spyro Gyra chronology
20/20 (1997)	Road Scholars (1998)	Got the Magic (1999)

Professional ratings
Review scores
Source	Rating
Allmusic	4.5/5 stars

Road Scholars is the second live album by the American jazz group Spyro Gyra, released in 1998 by GRP Records on CD and cassette. The final track on the US release, "Best Friends", is a studio recording. This is absent from the European release, which includes an additional live recording, "The Unwritten Letter", as the third track.

The live tracks were recorded between March 28 and September 12, 1997, in Arizona, California, Florida, New Mexico, New York, Pennsylvania, and Texas.

== Track listing ==
=== US release (GRP-9903) ===
1. "Heart of the Night" (Jay Beckenstein) – 6:43
2. "Breakfast at Igor's" (Beckenstein) – 7:22
3. "Morning Dance" (Beckenstein) – 4:16
4. "Shaker Song" (Beckenstein) – 10:16
5. "Shanghai Gumbo" (Julio Fernandez) – 6:29
6. "Innocent Soul" (Tom Schuman) – 6:27
7. "South American Sojourn" (Joel Rosenblatt) – 5:38
8. "Ariana" (Jeremy Wall) – 6:09
9. "De la Luz" (Fernandez) – 8:26
10. "Daddy's Got a New Girl Now" (Beckenstein) – 6:00
11. "Best Friends" (Scott Kreitzer, Randy Andos) – 4:04

=== European release (GRP-99132) ===
Tracks 1–2 as above.

3. "The Unwritten Letter" (Beckenstein) – 5:46

Tracks 4–11 as tracks 3–10 above.

== Personnel ==
Spyro Gyra

- Jay Beckenstein – saxophones
- Tom Schuman – keyboards
- Julio Fernández – guitars, vocals (9)
- Scott Ambush – 5-string bass, electric upright bass
- Joel Rosenblatt – drums, percussion

Additional musicians

- Jason Miles – drum programming (11)

=== Production ===
- Jay Beckenstein – producer
- Doug Oberkircher – recording (11), mixing (11)
- Ian Fraser – assistant engineer (11)
- Track 11 recorded and mixed at BearTracks Studios (Suffern, NY)
- Scott Hull – mastering at Masterdisk (New York, NY)
- Steve Byram – art direction, design
- Hollis King – art direction
- David Blankenship – boat landscape photography
- Alan Nahigian – band photography

Live personnel

- John Caron – production manager, lighting director
- Bill Heinzlmeir – monitor engineer, tape operator
- Al Oestreich – house sound engineer
- Dave Clarke – drum technician
