= Point of View (Spyro Gyra album) =

Studio album by Spyro Gyra
- Released: June 1989
- Recorded: 1989
- Studio: BearTracks Studios (Suffern, New York)
- Genre: Jazz, smooth jazz
- Length: 53:48
- Label: MCA Records
- Producer: Jay Beckenstein

Spyro Gyra chronology
| Rites of Summer (1988) | Point of View (1989) | Fast Forward (1990) |

Professional ratings
Review scores
| Source | Rating |
|---|---|
| Allmusic | 1.5/5 stars |

Point of View is the thirteenth album by the American jazz group Spyro Gyra, released in June 1989 by MCA Records. At Billboard magazine, the album peaked at No. 120 on the Top 200 Albums chart.

== Track listing ==
1. "Slow Burn" (Dave Samuels) – 4:07
2. "Swing Street" (Jay Beckenstein) – 5:13
3. "Fairweather" (Tom Schuman) – 4:46
4. "The Unknown Soldier" (Beckenstein) – 5:23
5. "Hannibal's Boogie" (Beckenstein) – 5:59
6. "No Limits" (Beckenstein) – 4:41*
7. "Carolina" (Richie Morales) – 4:34
8. "Riverwalk" (Samuels) – 4:29
9. "Swamp Thing" (Jeremy Wall) – 6:26
10. "Counterpoint" (Wall) – 3:56
11. "Gotcha" (Oskar Cartaya) – 4:09

"No Limits" (track No. 6) was not on the original LP but was included on the cassette and CD.

== Personnel ==
Spyro Gyra

- Jay Beckenstein – saxophones
- Tom Schuman – keyboards
- Jay Azzolina – guitars
- Oskar Cartaya – bass
- Richie Morales – drums
- Dave Samuels – mallet synthesizer, vibraphone, marimba

Additional musicians

- Julio Fernández – rhythm guitar (5)
- Roger Squitero – percussion (1, 7, 11)

=== Production ===
- Jay Beckenstein – producer
- Jeremy Wall – assistant producer
- Larry Swist – recording, mixing
- Chris Bubacz – additional engineer
- Doug Rose – assistant engineer
- Bob Ludwig – mastering at Masterdisk (New York City, New York)
- Jeff Adamoff – art direction
- Stephen Walters – digital design
- Ted Glazer – illustration
- Jeff Katz – photography
- Phil Brennan – management
