= The Deep End (Spyro Gyra album) =

Studio album by Spyro Gyra
- Released: May 25, 2004
- Studio: BearTracks Studios (Suffern, New York)
- Genre: Jazz, jazz pop
- Length: 64:47
- Label: Heads Up
- Producer: Spyro Gyra; Jeremy Wall

Spyro Gyra chronology
Original Cinema (2003)	The Deep End (2004)	Wrapped in a Dream (2006)

The Deep End is the twenty-seventh album by Spyro Gyra, released on May 25, 2004. The album peaked at No. 3 on the jazz album chart at Billboard magazine.

== Critical reception ==
Professional ratings
Review scores
Source	Rating
Allmusic	3.5/5 stars
Tom Hull	B−

Tom Hull dismissed the album as a "dud" in his "Jazz Consumer Guide" for The Village Voice in September 2004. In a commentary published on his website, he explained, "Spry funk, thick layers of guitar-keyb-sax that never let up, occasional tidbits of exotica, they don't aim for pablum, but they don't take risks either, so in the end they're as predictable as formula."

== Track listing ==
1. "Summer Fling" (Jeremy Wall) – 4:58
2. "Eastlake Shuffle" (Julio Fernandez) – 5:02
3. "Monsoon" (Jay Beckenstein) – 7:00
4. "As You Wish" (Beckenstein) – 4:36
5. "Joburg Jam" (Beckenstein) – 6:10
6. "The Crossing" (Fernandez) – 7:17
7. "Wiggle Room" (Scott Ambush) – 6:48
8. "Wind Warriors" (Tom Schuman) – 6:15
9. "In Your Arms" (Schuman) – 4:46
10. "Chippewa Street" (Beckenstein) – 5:46
11. "Beyond the Rain" (Ambush) – 6:09

== Personnel ==
Spyro Gyra

- Jay Beckenstein – saxophones
- Tom Schuman – keyboards
- Julio Fernández – guitars, vocals (6)
- Scott Ambush – bass

Guest musicians

- Billy Kilson – drums (1, 4, 10)
- Joel Rosenblatt – drums (2, 3, 6–9, 11)
- Ludwig Afonso – drums (5)
- Cyro Baptista – percussion (1, 3, 6)
- Daniel Sadownick – percussion (1–"-4, 7, 10, 11)
- Dave Samuels – vibraphone (4, 5, 7, 11)
- David Charles – percussion (8, 9)
- Don Harris – trumpet (1, 10)

=== Production ===
- Jay Beckenstein – executive producer, producer
- Jeremy Wall – producer (1)
- Julio Fernández – producer (2, 6)
- Scott Ambush – producer (7, 11)
- Tom Schuman – producer (8, 9)
- Doug Oberkircher – recording, mixing
- Eric Carlinsky – recording, assistant engineer
- Scott Hull – mastering at The Hit Factory (New York City, New York)
- Paul Blakemore – 5.1 surround sound mastering
- Colin Anderson – cover image
- Robert Hoffman – design
- Phil Brennan – management
