= Wrapped in a Dream =

Studio album by Spyro Gyra
- Released: February 28, 2006
- Studio: BearTracks Studios (Suffern, New York); Blue Noise Recording Studio (Frederick, Maryland)
- Genre: Jazz
- Length: 61:33
- Label: Heads Up
- Producer: Dave Love, Chuck Loeb, Spyro Gyra

Spyro Gyra chronology
The Deep End (2004)	Wrapped in a Dream (2006)	Good to Go-Go (2007)

Professional ratings
Review scores
Source	Rating
Allmusic	3.5/5 stars

Wrapped in a Dream is the twenty-eighth album by Spyro Gyra, recorded and released in 2006. The album peaked at No. 11 on the jazz album chart at Billboard magazine.

== Track listing ==
No.	Title	Writer(s)	Length
1.	"Spyro Time"	Julio Fernández	4:01
2.	"Midnight Thunder"	Chuck Loeb	4:12
3.	"The Voodooyoodoo"	Scott Ambush	5:21
4.	"Tuesday"	Loeb	4:59
5.	"Impressions of Madrid"	Jay Beckenstein	5:21
6.	"Impressions of Toledo"	Beckenstein	5:54
7.	"Wrapped in a Dream"	Beckenstein	6:25
8.	"After the Storm"	Fernández	6:06
9.	"Walkin' Home"	Tom Schuman	4:39
10.	"The Lowdown"	Jeremy Wall	4:09
11.	"Lil' Mono"	Ludwig Afonso/Schuman	5:48
12.	"Woogitybop (For Claire)"	Beckenstein	4:38

Track listing and personnel credits from AllMusic

== Personnel ==
Spyro Gyra

- Jay Beckenstein – alto saxophone, soprano saxophone, tenor saxophone, flute, keyboards, percussion, vocals
- Tom Schuman – keyboards
- Julio Fernández – guitars
- Scott Ambush – bass guitar, double bass

Additional musicians

- Ludwig Afonso – drums
- Josh Dion – drums, percussion
- Cyro Baptista – percussion
- Dave Samuels – marimba, vibraphone
- Eric Oliver – trombone
- Nathan Eklund – trumpet

=== Production ===
- Spyro Gyra – producers
- Chuck Loeb – producer
- Dave Love – executive producer
- Doug Oberkircher – engineer, mixing
- Eric Carlinsky – engineer
- Martin Walters – mixing
- Phil Magnotti – mixing
- Greg Calbi – mastering
- Robert Hoffman – art direction, design
- Jay Beckenstein – photography
- Cliff Yuhas – photography

Studios

- Mixed at BearTracks Studios; Big Time Audio (Jonesbourough, Tennessee); Phil Magnotti Studios (Norwalk, Connecticut).
- Mastered at Sterling Sound (New York City, New York).
