= Alternating Currents (album) =

Studio album by Spyro Gyra
- Released: June 15, 1985
- Studio: BearTracks Studios (Suffern, New York).
- Genre: Jazz, jazz fusion
- Length: 43:30
- Label: MCA
- Producer: Jay Beckenstein; Richard Calandra

Spyro Gyra chronology
Access All Areas (1984)	Alternating Currents (1985)	Breakout (1986)

Professional ratings
Review scores
Source	Rating
Allmusic	4/5 stars

Alternating Currents is the ninth album by jazz fusion group Spyro Gyra, released in 1985. At Billboard magazine, it reached No. 66 on the Top 200 Albums chart, No. 41 on the R&B Albums chart, and No. 3 on the Jazz Albums chart.

== Track listing ==
1. "Shakedown" (Jeremy Wall) – 4:22
2. "Alternating Currents" (Jay Beckenstein) – 4:28
3. "Taking the Plunge (for Jennifer)" (Beckenstein) – 4:48
4. "Binky Dream No. 6" (Beckenstein, Fernández, Morales, Schuman, Stone, Velez) – 4:13
5. "PG" (Beckenstein) – 4:15
6. "Heartbeat" (Wall) – 4:48
7. "Mardi Gras" (Dave Samuels) – 6:04
8. "I Believe in You" (Tom Schuman) – 5:31
9. "Sunflurry" (Schuman) – 5:01

== Personnel ==
Spyro Gyra

- Jay Beckenstein – saxophones, Lyricon
- Tom Schuman – keyboards
- Julio Fernández – guitars
- Kim Stone – bass
- Richie Morales – drums
- Gerardo Velez – percussion
- Dave Samuels – marimba, vibraphone

=== Production ===
- Jay Beckenstein – producer
- Richard Calandra – producer
- Jeremy Wall – assistant producer
- Larry Swist – engineer
- Rick Begin – assistant engineer
- John Penzotti – assistant engineer
- Bob Ludwig – mastering at Masterdisk (New York City, New York)
- Jeff Adamoff – art direction
- SteeleWorks Design – design
- William Coupon – band photography
- NASA – courtesy front cover photography of Hurricane Camille
- Phil Brennan – management
