= In Modern Times =

Jazz album

Studio album by Spyro Gyra
- Released: May 22, 2001
- Recorded: 2001
- Genre: Jazz fusion
- Length: 62:26
- Label: Heads Up
- Producer: Jay Beckenstein; Spyro Gyra; Chuck Loeb; Jeremy Wall

Spyro Gyra chronology
Got the Magic (1999)	In Modern Times (2001)	Original Cinema (2003)

In Modern Times is an album by the American jazz group Spyro Gyra, released in 2001 by Heads Up International. This album reached No. 2 on Billboard's Contemporary Jazz chart.

== Track listing ==
1. "After Hours" (Jay Beckenstein, Chuck Loeb) - 5:08
2. "Feelin' Fine" (Jay Beckenstein) - 4:23
3. "Julio's Party" (Julio Fernandez) - 5:08
4. "The River Between" (Scott Ambush) - 6:45
5. "Groovin for Grover" (Tom Schuman) - 5:50
6. "Open Door" (Julio Fernandez) - 4:38
7. "Florida Straits" (Jay Beckenstein) - 4:18
8. "Feelin' Fine Pt. 2" (Jay Beckenstein, Chuck Loeb) - 4:04
9. "East River Blue" (Jay Beckenstein) - 6:14
10. "Your Touch" (Jay Beckenstein, Tom Schuman) - 5:10
11. "Lucky Bounce" (Jeremy Wall) - 4:18
12. "Planet J" (Joel Rosenblatt, Phil Magallanes) - 4:42

== Personnel ==
Spyro Gyra

- Jay Beckenstein – saxophones
- Tom Schuman – keyboards
- Julio Fernández – guitars
- Scott Ambush – bass
- Joel Rosenblatt – drums

Additional musicians

- Dave Charles – percussion
- Marc Quiñones – percussion (7)
- Andrew Lippman – trombone (12)

No Sweat Horns

- Scott Kreitzer – tenor saxophone
- Randy Andos – trombone
- Barry Danielian – trumpet, horn arrangements

=== Production ===
- Jay Beckenstein – executive producer, producer
- Chuck Loeb – producer (1, 2, 8)
- Julio Fernández – producer (3, 6)
- Scott Ambush – producer (4)
- Tom Schuman – producer (5, 9, 10)
- Jeremy Wall – producer (11)
- Joel Rosenblatt – producer (12)
- Doug Oberkircher – recording
- Phil Magnotti – mixing, additional recording
- Joel Schanbach – additional recording
- J.P. Shegnowski – additional recording, assistant engineer
- Scott Hull – mastering at Classic Sound (New York, NY)
- Michael Bishop – surround sound mixing
- Andrew Mendelson – surround sound assistant engineer
- Robert Friedrich – SACD master production
- Robert Hoffman – design, cover photography
- David Wagner – photography
- Phil Brennan – management

== Charts ==
Chart (2001)	Peak position
Billboard Jazz Albums	2
