= Three Wishes (Spyro Gyra album) =

Studio album by Spyro Gyra
- Released: 1992
- Recorded: 1992
- Studios: BearTracks (Suffern, New York); Carriage House (Stamford, Connecticut); Lighthouse (Los Angeles, California)
- Genres: Jazz, smooth jazz
- Length: 57:43
- Label: GRP
- Producer: Jay Beckenstein

Spyro Gyra chronology
Fast Forward (1990)	Three Wishes (1992)	Dreams Beyond Control (1993)

Three Wishes is an album by the American jazz band Spyro Gyra, released in 1992 by GRP Records.

== Production ==
The album was produced by Jay Beckenstein. The band recorded the songs in less than a week, but spent two months in total working on Three Wishes. There was more of an effort to record live in studio, after Beckenstein heard comments praising the band's live show over its albums. Beckenstein also considered the songs on Three Wishes to be more thematically linked to each other rather than merely a collection of whatever songs the band had worked up. "Jennifer's Lullaby" is dedicated to Stan Getz.

== Critical reception ==
Professional ratings
Review scores
Source	Rating
AllMusic	3/5 stars
The Indianapolis Star	3.5/4 stars

The Washington Post deemed the album "a good deal less predictable and glossy than usual." The Toronto Star wrote that "the veteran group is inoffensively competent, swings lightly despite the ugly rock 'n' roll drumming but contains about as much inspiration as a night watching Valium-powered TV soaps." The Indianapolis Star determined that Three Wishes "is far more orchestrated than improvised, yet that keeps and perhaps deepens its entertainment edge."

== Track listing ==
1. "Pipo's Song" (Julio Fernandez) – 4:53
2. "Introduction to Breathless" (Jay Beckenstein) – 1:05
3. "Breathless" (Beckenstein) – 5:19
4. "Introduction to Real Time" (Dave Samuels) – 0:23
5. "Real Time" (Samuels) – 3:56
6. "Jennifer's Lullaby" (Beckenstein) – 5:40
7. "Whitewater" (Beckenstein) – 6:12
8. "Inside Your Love" (Jeremy Wall) – 4:07
9. "Nothing to Lose" (Beckenstein, Fernandez) – 5:03
10. "Three Wishes" (Beckenstein) – 4:47
11. "Gliding" (Beckenstein, Samuels) – 4:50
12. "Cabana Carioca" (Wall) – 5:18
13. "Rollercoaster" (Tom Schuman) – 4:29
14. "Three Wishes (reprise)" (Beckenstein) – 1:41

== Personnel ==
Spyro Gyra

- Jay Beckenstein – saxophones
- Tom Schuman – keyboards
- Julio Fernández – guitars
- Scott Ambush – bass
- Joel Rosenblatt – drums
- Dave Samuels – vibraphone, marimba

Additional Personnel

- Sammy Figueroa – percussion
- Larry Williams – saxophones
- Bill Reichenbach Jr. – trombone, bass trumpet
- Gary Grant – trumpet
- Jerry Hey – trumpet, horn arrangements

Production

- Dave Grusin – executive producer
- Larry Rosen – executive producer
- Jay Beckenstein – producer
- Jeremy Wall – assistant producer
- Larry Swist – recording, mixing
- Kevin Becka – assistant engineer
- Tom Bender – assistant engineer
- Doug Rose – assistant engineer
- Bob Ludwig – mastering at Masterdisk (New York City, New York)
- Michael Pollard – GRP production coordinator
- Doreen Kalcich – production coordinating assistant
- Andy Baltimore – creative director
- David Gibb – graphic design
- Scott Johnson – graphic design
- Sonny Mediana – graphic design
- Andy Ruggirello – graphic design
- Dan Serrano – graphic design
- Emili Bogan – graphic design assistant
- Michael Cobb – front cover illustrations
- Frank Linder – photography
