= Stories Without Words =

Studio album by Spyro Gyra
- Released: August 10, 1987
- Recorded: 1986
- Studio: BearTracks Studios (Suffern, New York)
- Genre: Jazz, jazz fusion
- Length: 40:32
- Label: MCA
- Producer: Jay Beckenstein; Jeremy Wall

Spyro Gyra chronology
Breakout (1986)	Stories Without Words (1987)	Rites of Summer (1988)

Professional ratings
Review scores
Source	Rating
AllMusic	3/5 stars

Stories Without Words is the eleventh album by American jazz fusion band Spyro Gyra, released in 1987. At Billboard magazine, it reached No. 84 on the Top 200 Albums chart and No. 67 on the R&B Albums chart.

== Track listing ==
1. "Cayo Hueso" (Jay Beckenstein) – 5:29
2. "Serpentine Shelly" (Tom Schuman) – 4:33
3. "Del Corazon" (Julio Fernandez) – 6:25
4. "Early Light" (Beckenstein) – 4:23
5. "Nu Sungo" (Manolo Badrena) – 4:10
6. "Chrysalis" (Dave Samuels) – 4:12
7. "Joy Ride" (Jeremy Wall) – 4:55
8. "Pyramid" (Wall) – 6:25

== Personnel ==
Spyro Gyra

- Jay Beckenstein – saxophones
- Tom Schuman – keyboards
- Julio Fernández – guitars
- Roberto Vally – bass
- Richie Morales – drums
- Manolo Badrena – percussion
- Dave Samuels – marimba, vibraphone

=== Production ===
- Jay Beckenstein – producer
- Jeremy Wall – assistant producer
- Larry Swist – engineer
- Chris Bubacz – assistant engineer
- Doug Rose – assistant engineer
- Doug Oberkircher – technical assistance
- Bob Ludwig – mastering at Masterdisk (New York, NY)
- Kathleen Covert – art direction, design
- Ted Glazer – front cover illustration
- Timothy White |– back cover photography
- Phil Brennan – management
