= 20/20 (Spyro Gyra album) =

Studio album by Spyro Gyra
- Released: May 13, 1997
- Recorded: 1997
- Studio: BearTracks Studios (Suffern, New York)
- Genre: Jazz fusion, smooth jazz
- Length: 50:25
- Label: GRP
- Producer: Jay Beckenstein

Spyro Gyra chronology
Heart of the Night (1996)	20/20 (1997)	Road Scholars (1998)

Professional ratings
Review scores
Source	Rating
Allmusic	3/5 stars

20/20 is the twentieth album by the American jazz group Spyro Gyra, released in 1997 by GRP Records.

== Track listing ==
1. "The Unwritten Letter" (Jay Beckenstein) – 5:07
2. "Ruled by Venus" (Julio Fernandez) – 4:49
3. "20/20" (Beckenstein) – 5:56
4. "Three Sisters" (Beckenstein) – 4:41
5. "Sweet Baby James" (James Taylor) – 3:51
6. "The Deep End" (Scott Ambush) – 6:35
7. "Together" (Fernandez) – 4:31
8. "Dark-Eyed Lady" (Jeremy Wall) – 4:55
9. "South American Sojourn" (Joel Rosenblatt) – 4:12
10. "Rockaway to Sunset" (Tom Schuman) – 5:48
11. "Return of the Pygmy" [Bonus track] – 6:05

== Personnel ==
Spyro Gyra

- Jay Beckenstein – saxophones
- Tom Schuman – keyboards
- Julio Fernandez – guitars
- Scott Ambush – bass
- Joel Rosenblatt – drums, timbales (9)

Additional personnel

- Manolo Badrena – percussion
- Bobby Allende – congas (1, 9)
- Dave Samuels – vibraphone (8, 9), marimba (8, 9)
- Chris Botti – trumpet (6, 10)
- Scott Krietzer – piccolo flute (9)
- Gabriela Anders – vocals (7, 8)
- Doris Eugenio – vocals (7, 8)
- Eugene Ruffolo – vocals (7, 8)

No Sweat Horns

- Scott Krietzer – tenor saxophone
- Randy Andos – trombone, bass trombone
- Barry Danielian – trumpet, flugelhorn, horn arrangements

=== Production ===
- Jay Beckenstein – producer
- Jeremy Wall – assistant producer
- Tom Schuman – assistant producer
- Julio Fernandez – assistant producer
- Doug Oberkircher – recording, mixing
- Kristin Koerner – assistant engineer
- Scott Hull – mastering at Masterdisk (New York City, New York)
- Kevin Gaor – art direction, design
- Richard Saja – front cover illustration
- Kevin Knight – photography
- Phil Brennan – management
