= Rites of Summer =

Studio album by Spyro Gyra
- Released: June 1988
- Studio: BearTracks Studios (Suffern, New York)
- Genre: Jazz, jazz fusion
- Length: 45:04
- Label: MCA
- Producer: Jay Beckenstein

Spyro Gyra chronology
Stories Without Words (1987)	Rites of Summer (1988)	Point of View (1989)

Professional ratings
Review scores
Source	Rating
AllMusic	3/5 stars

Rites of Summer is the twelfth album by Spyro Gyra, released in 1988. At Billboard magazine, No. 104 on the Top 200 Albums chart.

== Track listing ==
1. "Claire's Dream" (Jay Beckenstein) – 5:39
2. "Daddy's Got a New Girl Now" (Beckenstein) – 4:02
3. "Limelight" (Dave Samuels) – 4:27
4. "Shanghai Gumbo" (Julio Fernandez) – 4:28
5. "Innocent Soul" (Tom Schuman) – 4:52
6. "No Man's Land" (Jeremy Wall) – 5:37
7. "Yosemite" (Wall) – 5:21
8. "The Archer" (Richie Morales) – 4:59
9. "Captain Karma" (Schuman) – 5:40

== Personnel ==
Spyro Gyra

- Jay Beckenstein – saxophones, wind driven synthesizer
- Tom Schuman – keyboards
- Julio Fernández – guitars
- Oskar Cartaya – bass
- Richie Morales – drums, percussion
- Dave Samuels – vibraphone, marimba, percussion

Additional Personnel

- Steve Shapiro – synthesizer programming

=== Production ===
- Jay Beckenstein – producer
- Jeremy Wall – assistant producer
- Larry Swist – recording, mixing
- Doug Rose – assistant engineer
- Bob Ludwig – mastering at Masterdisk (New York, NY)
- Jeff Adamoff – art direction
- Ilene Weingard – design
- Ted Glazer – front cover illustration
- Lynn Goldsmith – back cover photography
- Phil Brennan – management
