= Dreams Beyond Control =

Studio album by Spyro Gyra
- Released: 1993
- Recorded: September 11, 1993
- Studio: BearTracks Studios (Suffern, New York); The Power Station (New York City, New York); Lighthouse Studios (Los Angeles, California)
- Genre: Jazz fusion
- Length: 54:01
- Label: GRP
- Producer: Jay Beckenstein

Spyro Gyra chronology
Three Wishes (1992)	Dreams Beyond Control (1993)	Love and Other Obsessions (1995)

Dreams Beyond Control is the seventeenth album by the American jazz group Spyro Gyra, released in 1993 by GRP Records. The group supported the album with a North American tour.

The album peaked in the top 5 on Billboard's Top Contemporary Jazz Albums chart.

== Production ==
The album was produced by Jay Beckenstein. Alex Ligertwood, formerly of Santana, sings on "Patterns in the Rain" and "Send Me One Line". It was the first time a Spyro Gyra album contained vocals in English. The Tower of Power Horns played on the album. The group experimented with the songs on tour before recording them. ""Waltz for Isabel" is a tribute to Beckenstein's third daughter.

== Critical reception ==
Professional ratings
Review scores
Source	Rating
AllMusic	4.5/5 stars

The Chicago Tribune deemed the album "a rather leaden excursion into R&B-flavored pop-fusion." The Boston Herald concluded that "beneath this somewhat tougher exterior beats the same faint musical heart, full of sweet melodies, perky rhythms and chatty solos—but every bit as empty of risk and guts as ever."

== Track listing ==
1. "Walk the Walk" (Julio Fernandez) – 4:20
2. "Patterns in the Rain" (Foster Paterson) – 4:38
3. "Breakfast at Igor's" (Jay Beckenstein, Scott Ambush) – 5:23
4. "Waltz for Isabel" (Beckenstein) – 4:43
5. "South Beach" (Fernandez) – 5:13
6. "Send Me One Line" (John Martyn) – 4:57
7. "Bahia" (Dave Samuels) – 5:08
8. "Kindred Spirit" (Tom Schuman) – 4:05
9. "Birks Law" (Beckenstein) – 4:36
10. "Same Difference" (Beckenstein, Fernandez) – 5:25
11. "The Delicate Prey" (Jeremy Wall) – 5:33
12. "Friendly Fire" (Dave Samuels, Jay Beckenstein, Joel Rosenblatt, Julio Fernandez, Scott Ambush, Tom Schuman) – 4:57

Friendly Fire (track No. 12) is only available on certain cassette and CD versions

== Personnel ==
Spyro Gyra

- Jay Beckenstein – saxophones
- Tom Schuman – keyboards
- Julio Fernández – guitars
- Scott Ambush – bass
- Joel Rosenblatt – drums
- Dave Samuels – vibraphone, marimba, mallets

Additional Personnel

- Howard Levy – harmonica (3)
- Marc Quiñones – percussion (5, 7)
- Cyro Baptista – percussion (7, 11)
- Alex Ligertwood – lead and backing vocals (2, 6)
- Lani Groves – backing vocals (6)
- Will Lee – backing vocals (6)
- Vaneese Thomas – backing vocals (6)

Tower of Power Horns (Tracks 1 & 3)

- Stephen "Doc" Kupka – baritone saxophone
- Emilio Castillo – tenor saxophone
- David Mann – tenor saxophone
- Greg Adams – trumpet, horn arrangements
- Alan Chez – trumpet

No Sweat Horns (Tracks 5, 7 & 10)

- Scott Kreitzer – tenor saxophone, flute, piccolo flute
- Randy Andos – trombone, bass trombone
- Barry Danielian – trumpet, flugelhorn, horn arrangements

=== Production ===
- Dave Grusin – executive producer
- Larry Rosen – executive producer
- Jay Beckenstein – producer
- Jeremy Wall – assistant producer
- Phil Brennan – assistant producer, management
- Larry Swist – assistant producer, recording, mixing
- Kevin Becka – assistant engineer
- Steve Regina – assistant engineer
- Dann Wojner – assistant engineer
- Ted Jensen – mastering at Sterling Sound (New York City, New York)
- Joseph Doughney – post-production technician
- Michael Landy – post-production technician
- The Review Room (New York City, New York) – post-production location
- Michael Pollard – production coordinator
- Diane Dragonette – production coordinating assistant
- Sonny Mediana – production director
- Sharon Franklin – production directing assistant
- Andy Baltimore – creative director
- Scott Johnson – art direction
- Dan Serrano – art direction
- Alba Acevedo – graphic design
- Jackie Salway – graphic design
- Martin LaBorde – front cover illustration
- David A. Wagner – color photography
