= Love & Other Obsessions =

Love and Other Obsessions

Studio album by Spyro Gyra
- Released: March 14, 1995
- Recorded: 1994–1995
- Studio: BearTracks Studios (Suffern, New York)
- Genre: Jazz, smooth jazz
- Length: 55:54
- Label: GRP
- Producer: Jay Beckenstein; Jeremy Wall

Spyro Gyra chronology
Dreams Beyond Control (1993)	Love and Other Obsessions (1995)	Heart of the Night (1996)

Professional ratings
Review scores
Source	Rating
Allmusic	2/5 stars

Love and Other Obsessions is a studio album by the American jazz group Spyro Gyra, released in 1995 by GRP Records.

== Track listing ==
No.	Title	Writer(s)	Length
1.	"Lost and Found"	Jay Beckenstein	5:10
2.	"Ariana"	Jeremy Wall	5:07
3.	"Serengeti"	Dave Samuels	4:54
4.	"Fine Time to Explain"	Scott Kreitzer	4:40
5.	"Third Street"	Beckenstein	4:48
6.	"Group Therapy"	Beckenstein; Scott Ambush; Julio Fernandez; Joel Rosenblatt; Samuels; Tom Schuman	5:44
7.	"Horizon's Edge"	Beckenstein	5:01
8.	"Let's Say Goodbye"	Kreitzer, Anthony Pompa	4:32
9.	"On Liberty Road (for South Africa)"	Ambush	5:52
10.	"Rockin' a Heart Place"	Julio Fernandez	5:23
11.	"Baby Dreams"	Schuman	4:42
Total length:			55:53

== Personnel ==
Spyro Gyra

- Jay Beckenstein – saxophones, arrangements (1, 5, 6)
- Tom Schuman – keyboards, arrangements (6, 11)
- Julio Fernandez – guitars, arrangements (6, 10)
- Scott Ambush – bass, arrangements (6, 9)
- Joel Rosenblatt – drums, arrangements (6)

Additional Musicians, Arrangements and Vocals

- Russell Ferrante – keyboards (3), arrangements (3)
- Steve Skinner – drum programming (2)
- Sammy Merendino – drum programming (5)
- Bashiri Johnson – percussion
- Dave Samuels – vibraphone, marimba, mallet synthesizer, marching drum, arrangements (6)
- Chieli Minucci – arrangements (2)
- Alex Acuña – arrangements (3)
- Vaneese Thomas – vocals (2)
- Billy Cliff – lead vocals (3, 4), backing vocals (8)
- Keith Fluitt – backing vocals (4, 8)
- Jana Jillis – backing vocals (4, 8)
- Anthony Michael Pompa – backing vocals (4, 8), arrangements (8)
- Barrington "Bo" Henderson – lead vocals (8)
- Deniece Williams – lead vocals (8)
- Wondress Hutchinson – backing vocals (8)

No Sweat Horns

- Scott Kreitzer – saxophones, alto flute, flute, bass clarinet, horn arrangements, arrangements (4, 7, 8)
- Randy Andos – trombone, bass trombone
- Barry Danielian – trumpet, flugelhorn

=== Production ===
- Jay Beckenstein – producer
- Jeremy Wall – associate producer
- Scott Kreitzer – co-producer (4, 8)
- Doug Oberkircher – recording, mixing
- Larry Swist – additional recording
- Robert Sicilliano – assistant engineer
- Ted Jensen – mastering at Sterling Sound (New York City, New York)
- Cara Bridgins – production coordinator
- Shelly Fierston – production director
- Hollis King – art direction
- Alba Acevedo – graphic design
- Laurie Goldman – graphic design
- Lois Greenfield – photography
- David A. Wagner – photography
- Phil Brennan – management
