= Down the Wire =

Studio album by Spyro Gyra
- Released: April 28, 2009
- Studio: Inner Machine Studios (Buffalo, New York); Big Time Audio (Jonesborough, Tennessee)
- Genre: Jazz fusion
- Length: 65:14
- Label: Heads Up
- Producer: Jay Beckenstein; Spyro Gyra

Spyro Gyra chronology
A Night Before Christmas (2008)	Down the Wire (2009)	A Foreign Affair (2011)

Down the Wire is the thirty-first album by Spyro Gyra, released on April 28, 2009. It was nominated for a Grammy Award for Best Pop Instrumental Album in 2010. Down the Wire peaked at No. 9 on the jazz album chart at Billboard magazine.

== Track listing ==
No.	Title	Writer(s)	Length
1.	"Down the Wire"	Scott Ambush	5:57
2.	"Unspoken"	Julio Fernandez	5:51
3.	"Not for Nothin'"	Tom Schuman	5:02
4.	"Island Pond"	Jay Beckenstein	6:00
5.	"The Tippin' Point"	Jay Beckenstein, Tom Schuman	5:24
6.	"Ice Mountain"	Bonny Bonaparte	6:58
7.	"A Flower for Annie Jeanette"	Scott Ambush	7:05
8.	"La Zona Rosa"	Jay Beckenstein	6:22
9.	"What It Is"	Julio Fernandez	6:23
10.	"A Distant Memory"	Jay Beckenstein, Tom Schuman	4:42
11.	"Make It Mine"	Bonny Bonaparte	5:30

== Personnel ==
Spyro Gyra

- Jay Beckenstein – saxophones
- Tom Schuman – keyboards
- Julio Fernández – guitars
- Scott Ambush – bass
- Bonny Bonaparte – drums, percussion, vocals

Additional musicians

- Gerardo Velez – percussion (2, 7), horn (8)
- Marc Quiñones – percussion (8)
- Bill Harris – tenor saxophone, flute
- Ozzie Melendez – trombone
- Don Harris – trumpet

=== Production ===
- Dave Love – executive producer
- Jay Beckenstein – producer
- Scott Ambush – co-producer (1, 7)
- Julio Fernández – co-producer (2, 9)
- Tom Schuman – co-producer (3, 5, 6, 10, 11)
- Bonny Bonaparte – co-producer (6, 11)
- Mike Brylinsky – engineer
- Justin Rose – engineer
- Martin Walters – mixing, mastering
- Natalie Singer – product manager
- Phil Brennan – cover artwork, management
- Robert Hoffman – design, photography
- Sean Gladwell – individual images
- Chris Harvey – individual images
