= Breakout (Spyro Gyra album) =

Studio album by Spyro Gyra
- Released: June 11, 1986
- Recorded: 1985
- Studio: BearTracks Studios (Suffern, New York)
- Genre: Jazz, fusion
- Length: 38:49
- Label: MCA
- Producer: Jay Beckenstein; Richard Calandra; Jeremy Wall

Spyro Gyra chronology
Alternating Currents (1985)	Breakout (1986)	Stories Without Words (1987)

Professional ratings
Review scores
Source	Rating
Allmusic	4.5/5 stars

Breakout is the tenth album by Spyro Gyra, released in 1986. It was the last album co-produced by Richard Calandra, who died of cancer later that October.

The band produced a music video for the song "Bob Goes to the Store" that was partially shot from the point of view of a roaming dog ("Bob").

Breakout peaked at No. 1 on the Billboard magazine Top Jazz Album chart on September 27, 1986 and at No. 71 on the "Billboard 200" pop album chart.

== Track listing ==
1. "Bob Goes to the Store" (Kim Stone) – 4:36
2. "Freefall" (Jay Beckenstein) – 4:52
3. "Doubletake" (Jay Beckenstein) – 4:05
4. "Breakout" (Jeremy Wall) – 4:37
5. "Body Wave" (Richie Morales, Mark Gray) – 4:09
6. "Whirlwind" (Dave Samuels) – 5:37
7. "Swept Away" (Jeremy Wall) – 5:43
8. "Guiltless" (Tom Schuman) – 5:10

== Personnel ==
Spyro Gyra

- Jay Beckenstein – saxophones
- Tom Schuman – keyboards
- Julio Fernández – guitars
- Kim Stone – bass
- Richie Morales – drums
- Dave Samuels – KAT Polyphonic mallet synthesizer, vibraphone, marimba
- Manolo Badrena – percussion

Additional Personnel

- Eddie Jobson – Synclavier programming

=== Production ===
- Jay Beckenstein – producer
- Richard Calandra – producer
- Jeremy Wall – assistant producer
- Larry Swist – engineer, front cover illustration
- Chris Bubacz – assistant engineer
- Bob Ludwig – mastering at Masterdisk (New York, NY)
- Jeff Adamoff – art direction
- Spencer Drate – art direction, design
- Judith Salavetz – design
- Duane Michals – rear cover photography
- Phil Brennan – management
