= City Kids (album) =

Studio album by Spyro Gyra
- Released: 1983
- Studio: BearTracks (Suffern, New York)
- Genre: Jazz, jazz fusion
- Length: 42:03
- Label: MCA
- Producer: Jay Beckenstein; Richard Calandra

Spyro Gyra chronology
Incognito (1982)	City Kids (1983)	Access All Areas (1984)

Professional ratings
Review scores
Source	Rating
AllMusic	4/5 stars

City Kids is the seventh album by Spyro Gyra, released in 1983. At Billboard magazine, it reached No. 66 on the Top 200 Albums chart, and No. 2 on that magazine's Jazz Albums chart.

== Track listing ==
All tracks are written by Jay Beckenstein except where noted.

No.	Title	Writer(s)	Length
1.	"City Kids"	Tom Schuman	5:11
2.	"Serpent in Paradise"		4:45
3.	"A Ballad"		5:42
4.	"Nightlife"	Jeremy Wall	4:32
5.	"Islands in the Sky"	Wall	6:44
6.	"Conversations"	Schuman	5:34
7.	"Silver Linings"		4:36
8.	"Haverstraw Road"		5:00

== Personnel ==
Spyro Gyra

- Jay Beckenstein – alto saxophone (1, 2, 4, 7, 8), soprano saxophone (2, 3, 5, 6), Lyricon (2, 3)
- Tom Schuman – electric piano (1, 5–7), synthesizers (1, 2, 5–7), acoustic piano (7)
- Jeremy Wall – acoustic piano (4), synthesizers (4, 5)
- Chet Catallo – guitars (1–3, 5, 8), guitar solo (7)
- Kim Stone – bass (1)
- Eli Konikoff – drums (1)
- Gerardo Velez – percussion (1, 5, 7)
- Dave Samuels – vibraphone (3, 5, 6), marimba (4–6)

Guest musicians

- Jorge Dalto – acoustic piano (3)
- Richard Tee – electric piano (4, 8), acoustic piano (8)
- Hiram Bullock – guitars (2, 4, 7)
- Steve Love – guitars (2, 4, 5, 8), guitar solo (2, 4), acoustic guitar (7), electric guitar (7)
- Will Lee – bass (2, 4)
- Eddie Gómez – bass (3, 6)
- Marcus Miller – bass (5, 7, 8)
- Steve Jordan – drums (2, 4, 7)
- Steve Gadd – drums (3, 5, 6, 8), percussion (4, 8)
- Manolo Badrena – percussion (2, 3, 5, 6), congas (3, 5)
- Rob Zantay – Lyricon programming

Horn section

- Jeremy Wall – arrangements and conductor
- Jay Beckenstein – alto saxophone
- Lou Marini – tenor saxophone
- Dave Bargeron – trombone
- Alan Rubin – flugelhorn, trumpet
- Lew Soloff – flugelhorn, trumpet

=== Production ===
- Jay Beckenstein – producer
- Richard Calandra – producer
- Jeremy Wall – assistant producer (1, 6)
- Tom Schuman – assistant producer (1, 6)
- Michael Barry – engineer, mixing
- John Penzotti – assistant engineer
- Bob Troeller – assistant engineer
- Bob Ludwig – mastering at Masterdisk (New York, NY)
- George Osaki – art direction
- Michael G. Cobb – cover illustration
