= A Night Before Christmas =

Studio album by Spyro Gyra
- Released: September 23, 2008
- Studios: Cove City Sound Studios (Glen Cove, New York); Eastside Sound Studios (New York City, New York); Twin Pines Studio (Pomona, New York); Hararinille Studios (Weehawken, New Jersey)
- Genres: Jazz, Christmas
- Length: 53:20
- Label: Heads Up
- Producer: Jay Beckenstein

Spyro Gyra chronology
Good to Go-Go (2008)	A Night Before Christmas (2008)	Down the Wire (2009)

A Night Before Christmas is the thirtieth album (and first Christmas album) by Spyro Gyra, recorded and released in 2008.

Janis Siegel of the Manhattan Transfer sings on "Baby, It's Cold Outside". The album peaked at No. 14 on the Holiday Albums chart at Billboard magazine.

== Track listing ==
No.	Title	Length
1.	"O Tannenbaum" (Traditional)	6:01
2.	"It Won't Feel Like Christmas" (Jay Beckenstein, Terry Cox)	3:46
3.	"Winter Wonderland" (Felix Bernard, Richard B. Smith)	3:18
4.	"Christmas Time Is Here" (Lee Mendelson, Vince Guaraldi)	5:47
5.	"Baby It's Cold Outside" (Frank Loesser)	4:42
6.	"Carol of the Bells" (Traditional)	4:36
7.	"Have Yourself a Merry Little Christmas" (Ralph Blane, Hugh Martin))	4:56
8.	"The First Noel" (Traditional)	4:36
9.	"Silent Night" (Traditional)	5:04
10.	"This Christmas" (Donny Hathaway)	5:49
11.	"The Christmas Song" (Mel Tormé, Robert Wells)	4:38

== Personnel ==
Spyro Gyra

- Jay Beckenstein – saxophones
- Tom Schuman – acoustic piano
- Julio Fernández – guitars
- Scott Ambush – bass
- Bonny Bonnaparte – drums, vocals (5, 11)

Additional musicians

- Dave Samuels – vibraphone (3, 6)
- Christine Ebersole – vocals (2)
- Janis Siegel – vocals (5)

=== Production ===
- Dave Love – executive producer
- Jay Beckenstein – producer
- Spyro Gyra – arrangements
- Kieran Paradis – engineer
- Jeff Shreiner – engineer
- Robert Harari – additional engineer
- Mark Urselli – additional engineer
- Doug Oberkircher – mixing
- Greg Calbi – mastering at Sterling Sound (New York, NY)
- Natalie Singer – product manager
- Robert Hoffman – art direction, design
- Getty Images/Stockbyte – illustration
- Phil Brennan – management
