= Fast Forward (Spyro Gyra album) =

Studio album by Spyro Gyra
- Released: April 25, 1990
- Recorded: 1990
- Studio: BearTracks Studios (Suffern, New York)
- Genre: Jazz fusion, smooth jazz
- Length: 48:35
- Label: GRP
- Producer: Jay Beckenstein

Spyro Gyra chronology
Point of View (1989)	Fast Forward (1990)	Three Wishes (1992)

Professional ratings
Review scores
Source	Rating
Allmusic	3/5 stars

Fast Forward is the fourteenth album by the American jazz group Spyro Gyra, released in 1990 by GRP Records. On this album only, the band was billed on the album cover as "Spyro Gyra featuring Jay Beckenstein". At Billboard magazine, the album peaked at No. 117 on the Top 200 Albums chart.

== Track listing ==
1. "Bright Lights" (Dave Samuels) – 5:20
2. "Para Ti Latino" (Oskar Cartaya) – 4:17
3. "Alexandra" (Jay Beckenstein) – 4:43
4. "Ocean Parkway" (Jeremy Wall) – 4:30
5. "Speak Easy" (Jeff Beal) – 5:02
6. "Futurephobia" (Tom Schuman) – 4:24
7. "4MD" (Wall) – 4:36
8. "Shadow Play" (Beckenstein) – 5:09
9. "Escape Hatch" (Schuman) – 5:11
10. "Tower of Babel" (Beckenstein) – 5:28

== Personnel ==
Spyro Gyra

- Jay Beckenstein – saxophones
- Tom Schuman – keyboards
- Jay Azzolina – guitars
- Oskar Cartaya – bass
- Richie Morales – drums
- Dave Samuels – vibraphone, marimba, mallet synthesizer
- Marc Quiñones – percussion

Additional Personnel

- Jeff Beal – trumpet solos, arrangements (5)
- David Broza – vocals (10)

No Sweat Horns

- Scott Kreitzer – tenor saxophone
- Randy Andos – trombone, bass trombone
- Barry Danielian – trumpet, flugelhorn, horn arrangements

=== Production ===
- Jay Beckenstein – producer
- Jeremy Wall – assistant producer
- Larry Swist – recording, mixing
- Chris Bubacz – additional recording
- Doug Rose – assistant engineer
- Ted Jensen – mastering at Sterling Sound (New York, NY)
- Andy Baltimore – creative director
- Jeff Adamoff – art direction
- David Gibb – graphic design
- Jacki McCarthy – graphic design
- Andy Ruggirello – graphic design
- Dan Serrano – graphic design
- Ted Glazer – illustration
- Paul D'Innocenzo – photography
- Phil Brennan – management
