= A Foreign Affair (Spyro Gyra album) =

2011 studio album by Spyro Gyra

Studio album by Spyro Gyra
- Released: September 13, 2011
- Studio: Clubhouse Recording Studios (Rhineback, NY); Menekeys Recording Studios (Union City, NY)
- Genre: Jazz
- Length: 60:47
- Label: Amherst
- Producer: Spyro Gyra

Spyro Gyra chronology
Down the Wire (2009)	A Foreign Affair (2011)	The Rhinebeck Sessions (2013)

Professional ratings
Review scores
Source	Rating
Allmusic	3.5/5 stars

A Foreign Affair is an album by American jazz fusion band Spyro Gyra. The album is the story of five men and their love affair with music. The album contains a Hindi song Khuda sung by Arijit Singh, composed by Sandeep Chowta and co-produced by Chowta and Spyro Gyra. It is the first time a Western group has released a song with lyrics entirely in Hindi.

== Track listing ==
No.	Title	Music	Artist(s)	Length
1.	"Caribe"	Jay Beckenstein	Spyro Gyra	5:27
2.	"Khuda"	Shabbir Ahmed, Sandeep Chowta	Arijit Singh	4:44
3.	"Sweet Ole Thang"	Bonnie Bonaparte	Spyro Gyra	4:26
4.	"Falling Walls"	Julio Fernández	Spyro Gyra	6:31
5.	"Shinjuku"	Tom Schuman	Spyro Gyra	5:08
6.	"Chileno Boys"	David Broza, Alberto Ríos	Fernandez	6:23
7.	"Samba for Two"	Schuman	Spyro Gyra	5:18
8.	"Canção de Ninar"	Beckenstein	Spyro Gyra	4:21
9.	"Antigua"	Beckenstein	Spyro Gyra	6:29
10.	"Last Call"	Fred Knoblock, Danny O'Keefe	Keb' Mo'	4:36
11.	"Dancing on Table Mountain"	Scott Ambush	Spyro Gyra	7:24
Total length:				60:47

== Release and chart history ==
The album was released on September 13, 2011. Upon release the album was positioned at No. 2 on the Billboard 200 Albums chart.

=== Release history ===
Region	Date	Format	Label	Ref.
United States	September 13, 2011	CD	Amherst	
India	September 13, 2011	Digital	Sony	
United Kingdom	February 13, 2012	CD	In-Akustik	

== Critical reception ==
AllMusic's Jonathan Widran opined that "the most interesting tracks are the beautiful, poignant vocal tracks by Keb' Mo' and Fernandez" and stated the band "still had something fresh to say while fearlessly entering their fifth decade of recording". JazzTimes's Brian Soergel concluded the review stating "this is the CD that many casual Spyro Gyra fans have been waiting for". Howard Dukes from Soul Tracks praised the songs in the album and stated "The ease in which the band amalgamates different international influences on A Foreign Affair is a reminder of why we call music the international language".

== Personnel ==
Credits for A Foreign Affair are adapted from AllMusic and Discogs.

Spyro Gyra

- Jay Beckenstein – saxophones
- Tom Schuman – keyboards
- Julio Fernández – guitars, vocals (6)
- Scott Ambush – bass
- Bonny Bonaparte – drums, percussion, backing vocals (6)

Additional musicians

- Pedrito Martinez – congas
- Sandeep Chowta – duduk (2), tabla (2)
- Tosin Aribisala – percussion (11)
- Arijit Singh – vocals (2)
- Keb' Mo' – vocals (10)

=== Production ===
- Leonard Silver – executive producer
- Spyro Gyra – producers
- Sandeep Chowta – co-producer (2)
- Paul Antonell – engineer
- Connor Milton – assistant engineer
- Elijah Walker – assistant engineer
- Martin Walters – mixing at Big Time Audio (Jonesborough, Tennessee)
- Adam Ayan – mastering at Gateway Mastering (Portland, Maine)
- Peter Ambush – cover illustration
- Phil Brennan – design, photography, management
