= Incognito (Spyro Gyra album) =

Studio album by Spyro Gyra
- Released: September 1982
- Studio: Ocean Way Recording (Hollywood, California); Secret Sound (New York City, New York); BearTracks Studios (Suffern, New York)
- Genre: Jazz, jazz fusion
- Length: 38:48
- Label: MCA
- Producer: Jay Beckenstein; Richard Calandra

Spyro Gyra chronology
| Freetime (1981) | Incognito (1982) | City Kids (1983) |

Professional ratings
Review scores
| Source | Rating |
|---|---|
| AllMusic | 4.5/5 stars |

Incognito is the sixth album by Spyro Gyra, released in 1982. At Billboard it reached No. 46 on the Top 200 Albums chart, and No. 2 on that magazine's Jazz Albums chart.

== Track listing ==
All tracks are written by Jay Beckenstein except where noted

| No. | Title | Writer(s) | Length |
|---|---|---|---|
| 1. | "Last Exit" | Tom Schuman | 4:17 |
| 2. | "Old San Juan" | | 6:41 |
| 3. | "Harbor Nights" | | 4:22 |
| 4. | "Stripes" | | 4:01 |
| 5. | "Oasis" | Jeremy Wall | 5:39 |
| 6. | "Incognito" | Tom Schuman | 5:56 |
| 7. | "Sueño" | Jeremy Wall | 4:05 |
| 8. | "Soho Mojo" | | 3:47 |

== Charts ==
=== U.S. Weekly charts ===
| Chart | Position |
|---|---|
| Billboard 200 | 46 |
| Billboard Jazz Albums | 2 |
| Billboard R&B Albums | 39 |
| Cash Box Top 100 Albums | 61 |
| Cash Box Top 30 Jazz Albums | 1 |
| Radio & Records Jazz Albums | 1 |

=== U.S. Year End chart ===
| Chart | Position |
|---|---|
| Billboard 1983 Jazz | 8 |

== Personnel ==
Spyro Gyra

- Jay Beckenstein – saxophones, whistle (2), percussion (2)
- Tom Schuman – Yamaha GS-1 (1), synthesizers (1, 2, 5, 6), electric piano (3, 5, 6, 8), acoustic piano (6)
- Jeremy Wall – electric piano (7)
- Chet Catallo – guitar textures (3), guitars (4, 8)
- John Tropea – guitar textures (3), slide guitar (4), guitars (5, 7)
- Gerardo Velez – percussion (1, 2, 4, 8)
- Dave Samuels – marimba (2, 6, 7), vibraphone (3, 7, 8)

Additional musicians

- Jorge Dalto – acoustic piano (2)
- Rob Mounsey – synthesizers (2, 5–7), vocoder (3, 6, 7)
- Richard Tee – acoustic piano (4, 8), organ (4)
- Hiram Bullock – guitar solo (1), guitars (6)
- Steve Love – guitars (1, 3–8), acoustic guitar (2), electric guitar (2)
- Will Lee – bass (1)
- Marcus Miller – bass (2–8)
- Steve Gadd – drums
- Manolo Badrena – congas (1), percussion (2, 5–7)
- Crusher Bennett – congas (5, 7)
- Toots Thielemans – harmonica (4)
- Tom Scott – Lyricon (5)

Horn Section

- Tom Scott – flute, saxophones
- Larry Williams – flute, saxophones
- Bill Reichenbach Jr. – trombone
- Gary Grant – flugelhorn, trumpet
- Jerry Hey – flugelhorn, trumpet, horn arrangements (1–4, 6–8)
- Jeremy Wall – horn arrangements (5)

String Section

- Jeremy Wall – string arrangements and conductor
- Harry Lookofsky – concertmaster
- Jonathan Abramowitz and Jesse Levy – cello
- Frederick Buldrini, Peter Dimirtiades, Lewis Eley, Regis Iandiorio, Harold Kohon, Harry Lookofsky, Guy Lumia, Marvin Morgenstern, Matthew Raimondi and Richard Young – violin

=== Production ===
- Jay Beckenstein – producer
- Richard Calandra – producer
- Michael Barry – engineer, mixing
- Steve Crimmel – assistant engineer
- Josiah Gluck – assistant engineer
- Debbie Rebhun – assistant engineer
- Nina Siff – assistant engineer
- Larry Swist – assistant engineer
- Bob Ludwig – mastering at Masterdisk (New York, NY)
- George Osaki – art direction
- Michael G. Cobb – cover illustration
