= Good to Go-Go =

Album by Spyro Gyra

Studio album by Spyro Gyra
- Released: June 12, 2007
- Studio: Harariville Studios (Weehawken, New Jersey); Big Time Audio (Jonesborough, Tennessee)
- Genre: Jazz, fusion
- Length: 68:56
- Label: Heads Up
- Producer: Spyro Gyra

Spyro Gyra chronology
Wrapped in a Dream (2006)	Good to Go-Go (2007)	A Night Before Christmas (2008)

Professional ratings
Review scores
Source	Rating
AllMusic	4/5 stars

Good to Go-Go is the 29th album by Spyro Gyra, released on June 12, 2007. This album has the first appearance by the drummer Bonny Bonaparte.

Good to Go-Go peaked at No. 9 on the jazz album chart at Billboard magazine. Many songs on the album have been used on The Weather Channel's Local on the 8s segments.

== Track list ==
1. "Simple Pleasures" (Jay Beckenstein) – 5:50
2. "Get Busy" (Tom Schuman) – 5:19
3. "Jam Up" (Bonny Bonaparte) – 4:15
4. "The Left Bank" (Beckenstein) – 5:40
5. "Funkyard Dog" (Julio Fernandez) – 5:02
6. "Along for the Ride" (Fernandez) – 6:45
7. "Island Time" (Scott Ambush) – 6:23
8. "Wassup!" (Schuman) – 4:45
9. "Easy Street" (Beckenstein) – 5:02
10. "A Winter Tale" (Beckenstein) – 6:34
11. "Good to Go-Go" (Ambush) – 6:41
12. "Newroses" (Beckenstein, Fernandez) – 6:46

== Musicians ==
Spyro Gyra

- Jay Beckenstein – saxophones
- Tom Schuman – keyboards
- Julio Fernández – guitars
- Scott Ambush – bass
- Bonny B – drums, percussion, vocals

Additional musicians

- Andy Narell – steel drums (3, 7)
- Marc Quiñones – congas (4, 7, 9, 11)
- Christian Howes – violin (4)

=== Production ===
- Dave Love – executive producer
- Spyro Gyra – producers, recording
- Eric Carlinsky – recording
- Martin Walters – mixing
- Greg Calbi – mastering at Sterling Sound (New York City, New York)
- Michael Bishop – 5.1 mastering at Heads Up/Telarc (Cleveland, Ohio)
- Robert Hoffman – art direction, design
- Paul Greco – photography
- Jennifer Scarcella – stylist
