= Access All Areas (Spyro Gyra album) =

Live album by Spyro Gyra
- Released: June 1984
- Recorded: November 17–19, 1983
- Venue: Florida
- Genre: Jazz, fusion
- Length: 85:09 / 76:49 (CD)
- Label: MCA
- Producer: Jay Beckenstein; Richard Calandra

Spyro Gyra chronology
City Kids (1983)	Access All Areas (1984)	Alternating Currents (1985)

Professional ratings
Review scores
Source	Rating
AllMusic	4.5/5 stars

Access All Areas is the first live album by Spyro Gyra, released in 1984 on double-LP vinyl, cassette tape, and CD. It reached No. 77 on the Top 200 album chart at Billboard magazine and No. 1 on that magazine's Jazz Albums chart.

== Track listing ==
No.	Title	Writer(s)	Length
1.	"Old San Juan"	Jay Beckenstein	8:20
2.	"Shaker Song"	Jay Beckenstein	7:14
3.	"Serpent in Paradise"	Jay Beckenstein	5:56
4.	"Heliopolis"	Jay Beckenstein	11:49
5.	"Harbor Nights"	Jay Beckenstein	7:04
6.	"Conversations"	Tom Schuman	8:30
7.	"Schu's Blues"	Tom Schuman	4:46
8.	"Morning Dance"	Jay Beckenstein	5:37
9.	"Islands in the Sky"	Jeremy Wall	6:29
10.	"Sea Biscuit"	Jay Beckenstein, Tom Schuman, Chet Catallo, Eli Konikoff, Gerardo Velez, David Wofford	6:03
11.	"Latin Streets"	Jorge D'Alto, Gerardo Velez	8:24

"Old San Juan" is only on vinyl, cassette and digital releases, but omitted on CD version due to 80 minutes limit; however, hence July 10th, 2025, the song is now available on digital for the first time in 41 years.

== Personnel ==
Spyro Gyra

- Jay Beckenstein – alto and soprano saxophones
- Tom Schuman – Yamaha CP-70, Yamaha GS2, Dyno Rhodes, Prophet-5, Memorymoog, Multimoog, Moog Liberation
- Chet Catallo – electric guitars, classical guitar
- Kim Stone – bass guitars, acoustic bass
- Eli Konikoff – drums
- Dave Samuels – vibraphone, marimba
- Gerardo Velez – congas, percussion, timbales

=== Production ===
- Jay Beckenstein – producer
- Richard Calandra – producer
- Tom Schuman – assistant producer
- Jeremy Wall – assistant producer
- Michael Barry – engineer, mixing
- Guy Charbonneau – engineer at Le Mobile
- Cliff Bonnell – assistant engineer
- John Penzotti – assistant engineer, mix assistant
- BearTracks Studios (Suffern, NY) – mixing location
- Bob Ludwig – mastering at Masterdisk (New York, NY)
- George Osaki – art direction
- Jon Echevarrieta – design
- Michael G. Cobb – cover illustrations
- Yukio Ichikawa – inside cover photography
- Phil Brennan – management

Live personnel

- Brad Malkus – production manager, lighting designer
- Randy Schuld – monitor engineer
- Neil Stadtmiller – sound engineer
- Don Kurek – keyboard technician
- Richard Snedecker – truck driver
