= Spyro Gyra (album) =

Studio album by Spyro Gyra
- Released: 1977 (re-released in 1978)
- Recorded: 1976 (re-recorded in 1977)
- Studio: Mark Studios (Clarence, New York); Blue Rock Studio (New York City, New York); House of Music (West Orange, New Jersey)
- Genre: Jazz fusion, smooth jazz
- Length: 43:54
- Label: Crosseyed Bear
- Producer: Jay Beckenstein; Richard Calandra

Spyro Gyra chronology
Spyro Gyra (1977)	Morning Dance (1979)

Professional ratings
Review scores
Source	Rating
Allmusic	3/5 stars

Spyro Gyra is the debut album by the jazz fusion group Spyro Gyra, released in 1978. The album was self-released on the label Crosseyed Bear Productions before the band signed with Amherst Records and re-released it with a different cover.

At Billboard magazine, the album reached No. 99 on the Top 200 Albums chart and also No. 99 in Canada. "Shaker Song" reached No. 16 on the Adult Contemporary singles chart, No. 90 on the Hot 100 singles chart, and was covered by the Manhattan Transfer on the album Extensions. In Canada, "Shaker Song" made No. 99 in the Top 100 chart, and No. 26 in the AO chart.

== Track listing ==
No.	Title	Writer(s)	Length
1.	"Shaker Song"	Jay Beckenstein	4:49
2.	"Opus D'Opus"	Beckenstein	5:08
3.	"Mallet Ballet"	Jeremy Wall	5:11
4.	"Pygmy Funk"	Wall	5:34
5.	"Cascade"	Wall	3:12
6.	"Leticia"	Wall	6:10
7.	"Mead"	Beckenstein	4:00
8.	"Paula/Paw Prints"	Beckenstein	4:01
9.	"Galadriel"	Wall	4:55

== Personnel ==
Spyro Gyra

- Jay Beckenstein – alto saxophone, soprano saxophone, tenor saxophone, percussion, arrangements
- Jeremy Wall – acoustic piano, Fender Rhodes, Minimoog, ARP Odyssey, ARP String Ensemble, Hammond organ, percussion, arrangements
- Jim Kurzdorfer – bass guitar
- Tom Walsh – drums, percussion
- Umbopha Emile Latimer – congas, percussion

Guest musicians

- Tom Schuman – Minimoog (7), acoustic piano (8), Fender Rhodes (8)
- Greg Millar – guitars (1, 2, 5, 7)
- Freddy Rapillo – guitars (3, 4, 6, 8, 9)
- Rubens Bassini – congas (1, 5, 6)
- Dave Samuels – marimba (1, 4), tabla (1, 4)
- Rick Bell – trombone (2)
- Fred Marshall – trombone (6)
- Anthony Gorruso – trumpet (6)

=== Production ===
- Jay Beckenstein – producer
- Richard Calandra – producer
- Jeremy Wall – assistant producer
- Chuck Madden – recording engineer
- Craig Bishop – mix engineer
- Lawrence Swist – mix engineer
- Jim Bonnefond – mix assistant
- Rusty Payne – editing
- Michael Cobb – cover design (1977 release)
- Chris Maggo – album design (1978 release)
