= Jorge Dalto =

- Born: July 8, 1948; Roque Pérez, Argentina
- Died: October 27, 1987 (aged 39) New York, New York, U.S.
- Genres: Jazz, Afro-Cuban, crossover jazz
- Instruments: Piano, Fender Rhodes

Jorge Dalto (July 8, 1948 – October 27, 1987) was a pop, jazz and Afro-Cuban music pianist from Argentina, and the former musical director and keyboardist (together with Ronnie Foster) for George Benson, contributing the acoustic piano intro and solo to Benson's 1976 Grammy-winning hit version of Leon Russell's "This Masquerade". He also performed with Tito Puente, Grover Washington, Spyro Gyra, Fuse One, Gato Barbieri, Willie Colon and others. He died of cancer at the age of 39.

Dalto's wife, Adela, is a jazz singer. His son, Billy, served in the Oregon House of Representatives from 2003 to 2007.

== Discography ==
=== As leader ===
- 1976: Chevere, with Adela Dalto (vocals), Bernard Purdie (drums), Ronnie Foster (keyboards), Tom Malone (trombone), Jerry Dodgion (alto, flute), Ernie Royal (trumpet), Victor Paz (trumpet), Rubén Blades
- 1983: Rendezvous, with David Sanborn (alto sax), Bob Mintzer (tenor sax), Tom Browne (trumpet), Artie Webb (flute), George Benson (guitar), Eric Gale (guitar), Ted Pearlman (guitar), Anthony Jackson (bass), Steve Gadd (drums), Buddy Williams (drums), Hector Casanova (drums, guiro), Carlos Valdes (congas), Nicky Marrero (timbales, bells, cowbell, wood block), Mark Hood (recorder, bells, engineer, mixing), Adela Dalto (vocals), Jocelyn Brown (vocals), Lillias White (vocals).
- 1983: Solo Piano
- 1984: New York Nightline, with Bob Mintzer (tenor sax, clarinet), Jay Beckenstein (alto sax), Alan Rubin (trumpet), Dave Valentin (flute), Carlos Valdes (congas), Nicky Marrero (timbales), Buddy Williams (drums), Steve Gadd (drums), Anthony Jackson (bass), Will Lee (bass), George Benson (guitar), Jeff Mironov (guitar), Bill Washer (guitar), Mark Gray (synthesizer).
- 1985: Urban Oasis, with Buddy Williams (drums); Adela Dalto (vocal); Carlos Valdes (congas); Nicky Marrero (timbales); Artie Webb (flute); Sal Cuevas (bass); Jose Mangual, Sr (bongos); Sergio Brandao (bass); Andy Gonzalez (bass); Jose Neto (guitar).
- 1988: Listen Up (posthumous release, recorded in 1978), with Stanley Banks (bass guitar);George Benson, Phil Upchurch (guitar); Hubert Laws (flute); Michael Brecker (tenor sax), Randy Brecker (trumpet, flugelhorn); Ronnie Foster (synthesizers); Anthony Jackson (bass guitar); Harvey Mason (drums); Frank Malabé (percussion).

=== As sideman ===
With Spyro Gyra

- Incognito (1982)
- City Kids (1983)
- Collection (1991)

With Chet Baker

- Studio Trieste (CTI, 1982) with Jim Hall and Hubert Laws

With George Benson

- Breezin' (1976)
- In Flight (1977)
- Weekend in L.A. (1978)
- Livin' Inside Your Love (1979)
- In Your Eyes (1983)

With Dizzy Gillespie and Machito

- Afro-Cuban Jazz Moods (Pablo, 1975)

With Grant Green

- Easy (1978)

With Heaven and Earth

- Refuge (1973)

With Willie Colón

- Tiempo pa` matar (1983)

With Gato Barbieri

- Yesterdays (1974)

With Djavan

- Luz (1982)
