= Eye Contact (Jay Beckenstein album) =

Studio album by Jay Beckenstein
- Released: 18 April 2000
- Studio: BearTracks Studios, Suffern, New York
- Genre: Jazz
- Length: 54:45
- Label: Windham Hill Jazz
- Producer: Jay Beckenstein, Chuck Loeb, Jason Miles, Chieli Minucci, Jeff Beal

Professional ratings
Review scores
Source	Rating
Allmusic	4/5 stars

Eye Contact is the debut album by Jay Beckenstein released in 2000.

== Track listing ==
1. "Sunrise" (Chieli Minucci) 5:09
2. "The Other Side" (Jay Beckenstein, Chuck Loeb) 4:49
3. "Northline" (Jay Beckenstein, Chuck Loeb) 4:27
4. "Eye Contact" (Chuck Loeb) 4:55
5. "West Side Cool" (Jay Beckenstein, Jason Miles) 4:07
6. "Heart and Mind" (Jay Beckenstein) 5:33
7. "Goodbye Pork Pie Hat" (Charles Mingus) 4:31
8. "Monsoon" (Jay Beckenstein) 6:29
9. "Black Market" (Joe Zawinul) 5:27
10. "Turnaround" (Jay Beckenstein, Bakithi Kumalo) 3:50
11. "Lookin' Up" (Jay Beckenstein) 5:23
