= Gamalon (band) =

Jazz-rock fusion band

Gamalon is a jazz-rock fusion band from Buffalo, New York. Its founding members included drummer Ted Reinhardt and guitarist Bruce Brucato, who had played together since the 1960s. The band's self-titled debut album released in 1987 reached No. 8 on the Billboard jazz chart the following year. In 1996, it released the album Held to the Light.

== Background ==
Four Gamalon members (brothers Ted and Tom Reinhardt, Brucato, Rick McGirr) played in a band called Rodan (Buffalo, N.Y) in the 1970s, along with bassist Bill Ludwig. In 1982, Brucato and Reinhardt joined forces with McGirr, George Puleo and Greg Piontek to create Gamelon. In the mid-1980s, the classic line up of Puleo, Brucato, Ted Reinhardt, and brother Tom Reinhardt was formed, re-spelling their name to the more phonetically pleasing Gamalon. This lineup released their self-titled debut album Gamalon in 1987. Following that release the lineup was augmented by violinist Geoff Perry. They went on to record Aerial View and High Contrast. In 1995, Puleo left the band and was replaced by Tony Scozzaro. This lineup recorded one album, Held to the Light. After Scozzaro left, guitar duties were handled by Nori Bucci and Dave Schmeidler. After bassist Tom Reinhardt left the band, he was replaced at various times by Jim Wynne and Jack Kulp, before returning to the lineup in the 2000s.

Past guitarists have included Nori Bucci, who was featured in Guitar Player in 2007, and recognized by the magazine as one of the top female guitarists in 2017, in part due to her "intense yet beautiful work in the band Gamalon" which "is fairly well documented on YouTube".

The band played a reunion show in 2012 in New York with the classic 4-piece lineup.

Bruce Brucato died on January 15, 2014. Greg Piontek died on November 11, 2016.

On March 4, 2015, founding and core member Ted Reinhardt died in a plane crash. Reinhardt has also played with Rodan, Taxi, Willie and the Reinhardts, Ron Locurto and the Reinhardts, the Dave Constantino Band, Junction West, Left Hand of Darkness, and Spyro Gyra. In 1973, playing with a Buffalo band called Rush, Ted opened for Genesis in Buffalo, NY.

== Discography ==
- Gamalon (1987)
- Aerial View (1990)
- High Contrast (1991)
- Held to the Light (1996)
- Live at The Tralf (1998)

also

- Ernie Watts with Gamalon: Project: Activation Earth (1989)

== Personnel ==
- Ted Reinhardt - drums, percussion, chapman stick (1982–2015)
- Bruce Brucato - guitars (1982-2006)
- George Puleo - guitars (1982-1996)
- Greg Piontek - bass (1982-1984)
- Tom Reinhardt - bass (1984-1996, 2001-2006)
- Tom Schuman - keyboards (1982-1983)
- Rick McGirr - keyboards (1983-1985)
- Jim Wynne - bass, keyboards (1996-2001, 2006–2015)
- Tony Scozzaro - guitars (1996-2004)
- Geoffrey Perry - violin, piccolo bass, guitar (1989-1996)
- Jack Kulp - bass (2001-2004)
- Nori Bucci - guitars (2004-2006)
- Bob Accurso - percussion, malletKAT (2006–2015)
- Dave Schmeidler - guitars (2006-2012)
