= Josh Dion Band =

American musical group

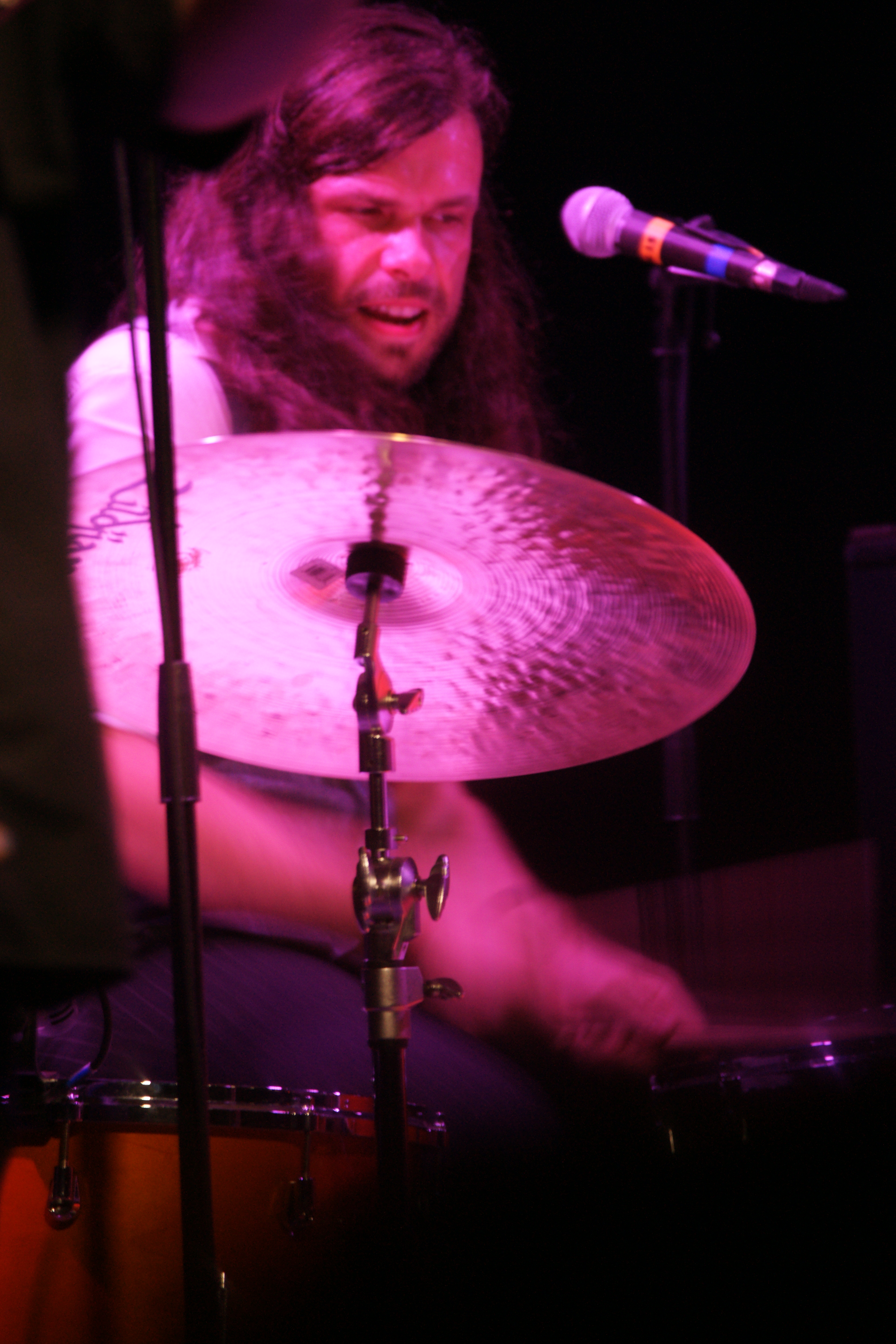
- Josh Dion (Nice 2012)

Background information
- Origin: New York City
- Genres: Rock n' roll, Americana
- Years active: 2004–2008
- Members: Josh Dion; Daniel Hindman; Sarah Versprille; Pat Firth; Brian Killeen
- Website: joshdionband.com

The Josh Dion Band is a musical group based out of New York City led by singing drummer/songwriter Josh Dion. The group is commonly associated with the rock n' roll/Americana genres of music.

== Personnel ==
- Josh Dion - lead vocals/drums

Dion is a "singing drummer" who made his first impression in New York in February 2004 at Blue Note with, among others, guitar master Chuck Loeb, saxophonist Kim Waters and Will Lee. Before that, he toured the country with jazz funk quartet ulu from 2003–2004 and played drums on their fourth record, entitled Nerve.

- Patrick Firth - keyboards/vocals
- Brian Killeen - bass
- Daniel Hindman - guitar/vocals
- Sarah Versprille - lead vocals/percussion

== History ==
In early 2004, Dion began writing and rehearsing original material with guitarist Daniel Hindman, keyboardist Pat Firth, and bassist Brian Killeen. All members of the band at one point attended William Paterson University in Wayne, NJ. Their first performance date was at the Sarah Street Bar and Grill on February 4, 2004 in Stroudsburg, PA. At the time, the focus of the group was based loosely on songwriting and heavily on improvisation because of the lack of original material. Early influences of the band included blues, funk, jazz, and rock n' roll, though this sound would become more consolidated as the band progressed.

In July 2004, the JDB (as it is affectionately abbreviated) began performing in New York City at such venues as Suite 16 and The Bitter End. By this point, the band had acquired enough original material to perform a consolidated set focusing now primarily on songwriting. Shortly after, vocalists Sarah Versprille and Justin Wade joined the group to help fill out the missing vocal harmonies in the developing songs of the band.

The band continued to perform in the New York City area as well as travel throughout the East Coast opening for the likes of Buddy Guy, Los Lonely Boys, Eric Johnson, Spyro Gyra, and Cowboy Mouth. During this time they recorded their first album entitled 'Give Love', which included appearances from guitarist Chuck Loeb and bassist Will Lee.

The 'Give Love' album opened doorways for the group to travel to Spain for their first international tour in May 2006. This tour was dubbed the 'Word Of Mouth' tour simply because the band was an unknown quantity in Europe at the time. The band was received with excellent reviews and attendance at all of its shows. After returning to the United States the group began recording their second album of live material simply entitled Live, released on October 7, 2006.

In 2007, the band continued touring heavily with an appearance at the Den Hague Jazz Festival as well as a second tour of Spain and an opening performance slot with the Spin Doctors. Their last album, 'Anthems For The Long Distance' was released on May 2, 2008 at a release show at the Highline Ballroom in New York City. Shortly after, the band returned to Spain for a third tour with an appearance at the WOMAD festival in Cáceres. Josh Dion Band officially performed their last show on December 31, 2008 as part of a New Year's Eve celebration at the Bitter End in New York City.

== Discography ==
- Give Love (2005)
- Live (2006)
- Anthems For The Long Distance (2008)
