= Scott Ambush =

American musician

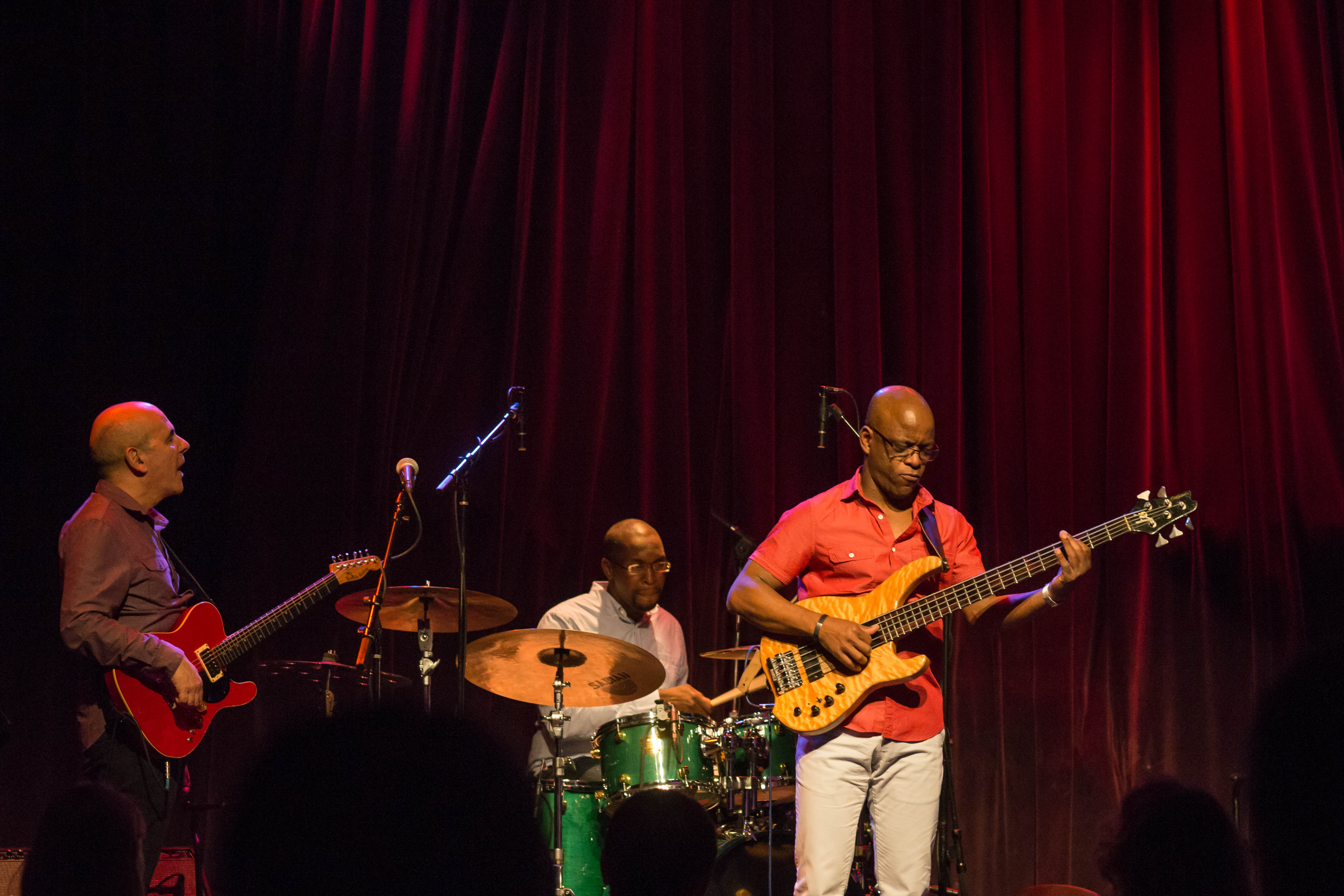
- Scott (right) at his performance

Background information
- Born: April 28, 1960 (age 66); Frederick, Maryland
- Genre: Jazz fusion
- Instrument: Bass
- Member of: Spyro Gyra

Scott Antel Ambush (born April 28, 1960) is an American musician, best known as the bass player of jazz fusion band Spyro Gyra.

== Biography ==
He was born in Frederick, Maryland, to Webster and Jeanette Lofton Ambush. He attended Urbana Elementary School in Urbana, Maryland, West Frederick Middle, and Frederick High School. After high school, he attended the University of Maryland at College Park. While studying psychology during the day, he was introduced to the Washington, D.C., music scene at night. Through word of mouth, he was recommended for the bass job with Spyro Gyra and filled the bass space after audition. He made his studio debut with Spyro Gyra in 1992 on the album "Three Wishes".

== Discography ==
=== With Spyro Gyra ===
- Three Wishes (1992), GRP
- Dreams Beyond Control (1993), GRP
- Love and Other Obsessions (1995), GRP
- Heart Of The Night (1996), GRP
- 20/20 (1997), GRP
- Road Scholars (live) (1998), GRP
- Got The Magic (1999), Windham Hill Jazz
- In Modern Times (2001), Heads Up
- Original Cinema (2003), Heads Up
- The Deep End (2004), Heads Up
- Wrapped in a Dream (2006), Heads Up
- Good to Go-Go (2007), Heads Up
- A Night Before Christmas (2008), Heads Up
- Down the Wire (2009), Heads Up
- A Foreign Affair (2011), Amherst Records
- The Rhinebeck Sessions (2013), Crosseyed Bear

=== With Mindset ===
- Mindset (1991)

==== Session & Guest Appearances ====
- Beyond the Light, Adonis Mitzelos (2000)
