= Manolo Badrena =

Puerto Rican percussionist (born 1952)

Manolo Badrena (born March 17, 1952, in San Juan, Puerto Rico) is a percussionist most noted for his work with Weather Report from 1976 to 1977. He has made contributions to over 100 recordings that span jazz, world music, pop, and Latin music. Badrena has played with The Zawinul Syndicate, the Rolling Stones, Mezzoforte, Joni Mitchell, Spyro Gyra, Art Blakey, Bill Evans, Steve Khan, Carla Bley, Talking Heads, Blondie, Michael Franks, Ahmad Jamal, Hugo Fattoruso, and others.

Badrena lives in Fairview, New Jersey. He is the leader (drums, percussion, guitar, vocals) of the Latin jazz band Trio Mundo.

== Discography ==
=== As leader ===
- Manolo (A&M, 1979)
- Carnaval with Trio Mundo (Khaeon, 2002)
- Trio Mundo Rides Again with Trio Mundo (ZOHO, 2004)

=== As sideman ===
With Herb Alpert

- Main Event Live (A&M, 1978)
- Rise (A&M, 1979)
- Beyond (A&M, 1980)

With Bill Evans

- Living in the Crest of a Wave (Elektra Musician, 1984)
- The Alternative Man (Blue Note, 1985)
- Live in Europe (Lipstick, 1995)
- Escape (Escapade, 1996)
- Touch (ESC, 1999)
- Big Fun (ESC, 2002)

With Terumasa Hino

- Double Rainbow (CBS, 1981)
- Pyramid (CBS, 1982)
- Detour (EMI, 1988)

With Masaru Imada

- Seaside (1982)
- Blue Marine (Full House, 1982)
- Tropical Sunset (Full House, 1984)

With Ahmad Jamal

- Rossiter Road (Atlantic, 1986)
- The Essence Part One (Birdology, 1995)
- Big Byrd: The Essence Part 2 (Verve, 1996)
- Live in Paris 1996 (Birdology, 1999)
- It's Magic (Birdology, 2008)
- A Quiet Time (Dreyfus, 2009)
- Blue Moon (Jazz Village, 2012)
- Saturday Morning (Jazz Village, 2013)
- Ahmad Jamal Featuring Yusef Lateef Live (Jazz Village, 2014)
- Live in Marciac August 5th 2014 (Jazz Village, 2015)
- Marseille (Jazz Village, 2017)

With Steve Khan

- Eyewitness (Antilles, 1981)
- Modern Times (Trio, 1982)
- Casa Loco (Antilles, 1984)
- Helping Hand (Polydor, 1987)
- Public Access (GRP, 1990)
- Headline (Polydor, 1992)
- Crossings (Polygram, 1994)
- The Green Field (Tone Center, 2005)
- Borrowed Time (ESC, 2007)
- Parting Shot (ESC, 2011)

With Spyro Gyra

- Incognito (MCA, 1982)
- City Kids (MCA, 1983)
- Breakout (MCA, 1986)
- Stories Without Words (MCA, 1987)
- 20/20 (GRP, 1997)

With Weather Report

- Heavy Weather (Columbia, 1977)
- Mr. Gone (CBS, 1978)
- Live and Unreleased (Columbia, 2002)
- Forecast: Tomorrow (Columbia, 2006)

With Joe Zawinul

- World Tour (ESC, 1998)
- Two Years with the Zawinul Syndicate (ESC, 2000)
- Faces & Places (Cream, 2002)
- Vienna Nights Live at Joe Zawinul's Birdland (BHM, 2005)

With others

- Mina Agossi, Simple Things? (Candid, 2008)
- Laurie Anderson, Strange Angels (Warner Bros., 1989)
- Philip Bailey, Love Will Find a Way (Verve, 2019)
- Victor Bailey, Slippin' 'n' Trippin' (Studio V, 2009)
- Louie Bellson, Ecue (Pablo, 1978)
- Bob Berg, Back Roads (Denon, 1991)
- Charles Blenzig, Say What You Mean (Big World, 1993)
- Carla Bley, Heavy Heart (WATT, 1984)
- Carla Bley, Night-Glo (WATT, 1985)
- Blondie, The Hunter (Chrysalis, 1982)
- Brecker Brothers, Straphangin' (Arista, 1981)
- Randy Brecker & Eliane Elias, Amanda (Passport, 1985)
- Till Brönner, Midnight (Button, 1996)
- Chic, Take It Off (Atlantic, 1981)
- Ronnie Cuber, The Scene Is Clean (Milestone, 1994)
- Ronnie Cuber, Passion Fruit (Electric Bird, 1985)
- Paquito D'Rivera, Why Not! (Columbia, 1984)
- George Duke, Reach for It (Epic, 1977)
- Mark Egan, Mosaic (Hip Pocket, 1985)
- Mark Egan, Beyond Words (Bluemoon, 1991)
- Eliane Elias, The Three Americas (Blue Note, 1997)
- Eliane Elias, Music from Man of La Mancha (Concord Jazz, 2018)
- Dalia Faitelson, Diamond of the Day (Stunt, 2001)
- Sonny Fortune, With Sound Reason (Atlantic, 1979)
- Michael Franks, Skin Dive (Warner Bros., 1985)
- Michael Franks, Abandoned Garden (Warner Bros., 1995)
- Fuse One, Silk (CTI, 1981)
- Lani Hall, Double or Nothing (A&M, 1979)
- Debbie Harry, KooKoo (Chrysalis, 1981)
- Billy Hart, Oshumare (Gramavision, 1984)
- Toninho Horta, From Ton to Tom (Videoarts, 1999)
- Charlie Hunter/Chinna Smith/Ernest Ranglin, Earth Tones (Green Streets, 2005)
- Fumio Karashima, I Used to Be Alone (Polydor, 1984)
- Fridrik Karlsson, Point Blank (Steinar, 1990)
- Earl Klugh, Crazy for You (Liberty, 1981)
- Pete Levin, A Solitary Man (Gramavision, 1991)
- Pete Levin, Jump! (Pete Levin, 2010)
- Jakob Magnusson, Special Treatment (Warner Bros., 1979)
- Mike Mainieri, Wanderlust (Warner Bros., 1981)
- Herbie Mann, See Through Spirits (Atlantic, 1985)
- Tania Maria, Bela Vista (World Pacific, 1990)
- Lou Marini, Starmaker (Blujazz, 2012)
- Hector Martignon, Portrait in White and Black (Candid, 1996)
- Hugh Masekela, Main Event Live (A&M, 1978)
- Sleepy Matsumoto, Papillon (Compose, 1992)
- John Mayer, Continuum (Columbia, 2006)
- Vince Mendoza, Instructions Inside (Manhattan, 1991)
- Bob Mintzer, Source (Agharta, 1982)
- Joni Mitchell, Don Juan's Reckless Daughter (Asylum, 1977)
- Airto Moreira, I'm Fine, How Are You? (Warner Bros., 1977)
- Airto Moreira, Touching You...Touching Me (Warner Bros., 1979)
- Teruo Nakamura, Super Friends (Eastworld, 1985)
- Ivo Perelman, Children of Ibeji (Enja, 1992)
- Noel Pointer, Never Lose Your Heart (Shanachie, 1993)
- Rare Silk, American Eyes (Palo Alto, 1985)
- Dianne Reeves, Bridges (Blue Note, 1999)
- John Scofield, That's What I Say (Verve, 2005)
- James Senese, Passpartu (Itwhy, 2003)
- Lew Soloff, Hanalei Bay (Bellaphon, 1985)
- Lew Soloff, Little Wing (Sweet Basil, 1991)
- Raul de Souza, Don't Ask My Neighbors (Capitol, 1978)
- Mike Stern, Jigsaw (Atlantic, 1989)
- Dave Stryker, Shades of Miles (SteepleChase, 2000)
- Dave Stryker, Changing Times (SteepleChase, 2001)
- Andy Summers, World Gone Strange (Private Music, 1991)
- Torbjorn Sunde, Meridians (ACT, 1998)
- Harvie Swartz, Urban Earth (Gramavision, 1985)
- Talking Heads, Naked (Sire, 1988)
- Jeff Tyzik, Jammin' in Manhattan (Polydor, 1984)
- Dave Valentin, Flute Juice (GRP, 1983)
- Gino Vannelli, Brother to Brother (A&M, 1978)
- Steven Van Zandt, Men Without Women (EMI, 1982)
