= Dave Samuels =

American vibraphone and marimba player (1948–2019)

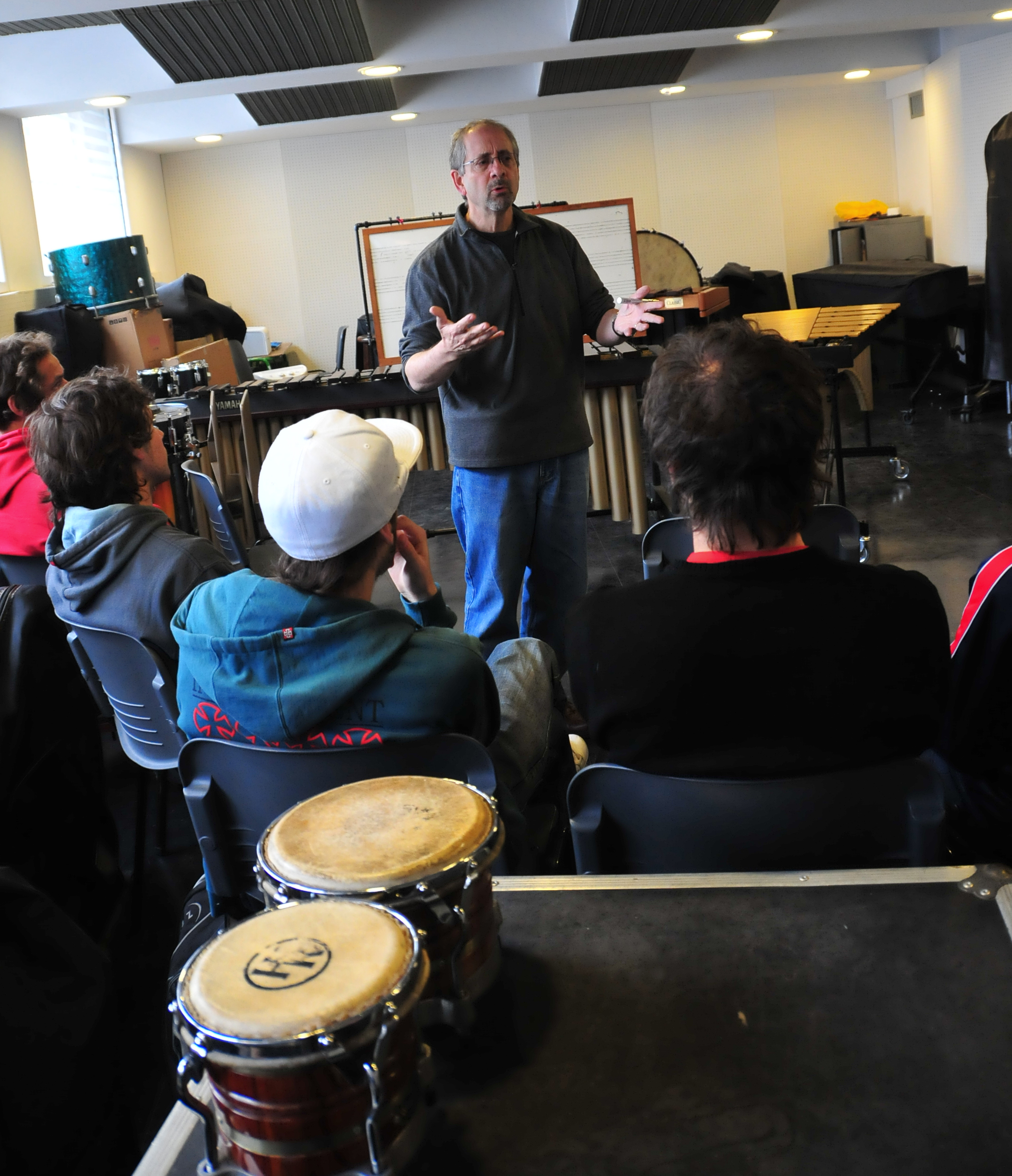
- Samuels teaching a class at the Music School of Montevideo, 2010.

Background information
- Birth name: David Alan Samuels
- Born: October 9, 1948; Waukegan, Illinois, U.S.
- Died: April 22, 2019 (aged 70)
- Genres: Jazz, contemporary jazz, Latin jazz
- Occupation: Musician
- Instrument(s): Vibraphone, Marimba
- Years active: 1974–2019
- Labels: Enja, ECM, MCA, GRP, Heads Up, Verve

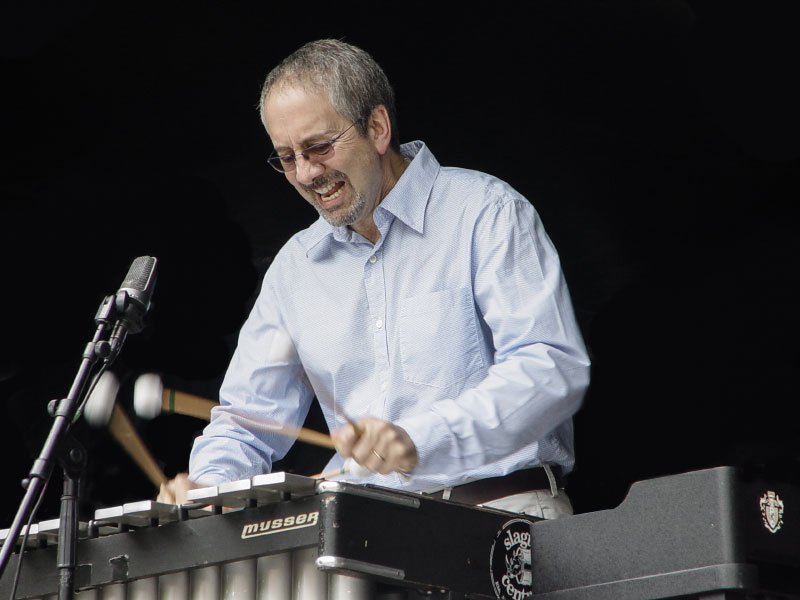
Dave Samuels at Aarhus Jazz Festival (Denmark 2009)

David Alan Samuels (October 9, 1948 – April 22, 2019) was an American vibraphone and marimba player who spent many years with the contemporary jazz group Spyro Gyra. His recordings and live performances during that period also reflect his prowess on the steelpan, a tuned percussion instrument of Trinidadian origin.

== Biography ==
Samuels was born in Waukegan, Illinois, United States. At the age of six he started playing drums and piano. He learned vibes and marimba while a student at Boston University. He continued his studies at the Berklee College of Music, also in Boston, and studied with vibraphonist Gary Burton. He taught percussion at Berklee before moving to New York City in 1974. Soon he was recording and performing with Gerry Mulligan, Carla Bley, and Gerry Niewood. He played in a vibes/marimba duo with David Friedman, who had been his teacher at Boston, releasing albums under the name Double Image.

In 1979 he began recording with Spyro Gyra, eventually becoming a member of the band in 1986 and remaining with it through the 1990s. During the 1980s he also recorded with Paul McCandless, Art Lande, Anthony Davis, and Bobby McFerrin. In 1993 he created the Caribbean Jazz Project.

Samuels wrote columns for the magazines Modern Percussionist and Modern Drummer, a method book, and made an instructional video. He taught at Berklee and at the New England Conservatory of Music.

Samuels died on April 22, 2019, due to an undisclosed long-term illness.

== Discography ==
- 1980 One Step Ahead (Dire Silverline)
- 1988 Living Colors (MCA)
- 1989 Ten Degrees North (MCA)
- 1989 Fountainhead with Andy LaVerne (SteepleChase)
- 1991 Natural Selection (GRP)
- 1992 Del Sol (GRP)
- 1994 Synergy with Samuels (Tall Poppies)
- 1998 Tjader-ized: A Cal Tjader Tribute (Verve/Polygram)
- 2006 Mosaic (Concord)
- 2007 Dualism

With Spyro Gyra

- 1978 Spyro Gyra
- 1979 Morning Dance
- 1980 Catching the Sun
- 1980 Carnaval
- 1981 Freetime
- 1982 Incognito
- 1983 City Kids
- 1984 Access All Areas
- 1985 Alternating Currents
- 1986 Breakout
- 1987 Stories Without Words
- 1988 Rites of Summer
- 1989 Point of View
- 1990 Fast Forward
- 1992 Three Wishes
- 1993 Dreams Beyond Control
- 1995 Love and Other Obsessions
- 1996 Heart of the Night
- 1997 20/20
- 1999 Got the Magic
- 2003 Original Cinema
- 2004 The Deep End
- 2006 Wrapped in a Dream
- 2008 A Night Before Christmas

With Caribbean Jazz Project

- 1995 The Caribbean Jazz Project
- 1997 Island Stories
- 2000 New Horizons
- 2001 Paraiso
- 2002 The Gathering
- 2003 Birds of a Feather
- 2005 Diane Schuur Featuring Caribbean Jazz Project – Schuur Fire
- 2005 Here and Now: Live in Concert
- 2006 Mosaic
- 2008 Afro Bop Alliance

With Double Image

- 1977 Double Image
- 1979 Dawn
- 1986 In Lands I Never Saw
- 1994 Open Hand (live)
- 1997 Duotones
- 2006 Moment to Moment (Live in Concert)

=== As sideman ===
With Gerry Mulligan

- 1974 Carnegie Hall Concert (CTI), Chet Baker, Gerry Mulligan
- 1976 Idol Gossip
- 1995 Dragonfly

With others

- 1977 Gerry Niewood and Timepiece, Gerry Niewood & Timepiece
- 1978 Dawn, David Friedman
- 1978 Zappa in New York, Frank Zappa
- 1979 All the Mornings Bring, Paul McCandless
- 1981 Gallery, Gallery
- 1981 The Navigator, Paul McCandless
- 1981 Skylight, Art Lande
- 1983 Hemispheres, Anthony Davis
- 1986 Storytime, T Lavitz
- 1991 Cool Running, Jeremy Wall
- 1991 You Can't Do That on Stage Anymore, Vol. 4, Frank Zappa
- 1992 Red Sun, Dave Valentin
- 1992 Stepping to the New World, Jeremy Wall
- 1993 A Night in Englewood, Paquito D'Rivera & the United Nation Orchestra
- 1993 Arc, Jimmy Haslip
- 1994 Picture Perfect Morning, Edie Brickell
- 1994 Two Hearts, Peter Kater
- 1995 We Live Here, Pat Metheny Group
- 1994 World Tour, Jason Miles
- 1997 Playin' Hooky, Bob James
- 1997 Imaginary Day, Pat Metheny Group
- 1999 A Map of the World, Pat Metheny
- 2002 Speaking of Now, Pat Metheny Group
- 2005 The Way Up, Pat Metheny Group
- 2006 Balance, Yotam Rosenbaum
