= Spyro Gyra =

American jazz fusion band

- Spyro Gyra in 2026

Background information
- Origin: Buffalo, New York, U.S.
- Genres: Jazz, jazz fusion, smooth jazz
- Years active: 1974–present
- Labels: Amherst, MCA, GRP, Windham Hill, Heads Up
- Members: Jay Beckenstein; Scott Ambush; Julio Fernández; Lionel Cordew; Chris Fischer
- Past members: Jeremy Wall; Dave Samuels; Gerardo Velez; Bonny Bonaparte; Tom Schuman; Joel Rosenblatt; Chet Catallo; Dave Wofford; Eli Konikoff; Richard Calandra; Richie Morales; Kim Stone; Oskar Cartaya; Tom Walsh; Jim Kurzdorfer; Ted Reinhardt; Lee Pearson II; Marc Quiñones; Manolo Badrena
- Website: www.spyrogyra.com

Spyro Gyra /ˌspaɪroʊˈdʒaɪrə/ is an American jazz fusion band formed in Buffalo, New York, in 1974. The band's music combines jazz, R&B, funk, and pop music.

The band's name comes from Spirogyra, misspelled by the Buffalo club owner where the band formed, a genus of green algae which founder Jay Beckenstein "first ran across in a biology textbook, nothing special unless you really like algae. It was flippant. It was a joke." "In retrospect, it’s okay. In a way, it sounds like what we do. It sounds like motion and energy.” explains Beckenstein

== History ==
=== Early years ===
Saxophonist Jay Beckenstein and keyboardist Jeremy Wall formed a band with jazz and rock musicians who were playing in the Buffalo bar and club circuit. In 1974, when a bar owner asked for the band's name, Beckenstein said, "spirogyra", a type of algae he had learned about in school. The bar owner wrote the name incorrectly, "Spyro Gyra", but it stuck. The founding members of the band were Beckenstein, Wall, bassist Jim Kurzdorfer, drummer Tom Walsh, and keyboardist Tom Schuman. In 1977, they released Spyro Gyra independently before making a deal with Amherst Records, which re-released the album with a different cover. It included "Shaker Song," which reached No. 90 on Billboard's Hot 100, No. 99 on the pop chart in Canada, and No. 26 on the Canadian AC chart. Jay Beckenstein and Richard Calandra co-produced the record, while Beckenstein and Wall each wrote an equal number of compositions. After the success of "Shaker Song," the band went on tour in 1978 with a lineup including Beckenstein on sax, Wall and Schuman on keyboards, Kurzdorfer on bass, Freddy Rapillo on guitar, Eli Konikoff on drums and Gerardo Velez on percussion.

The band's second album Morning Dance reached No. 11 in the UK Albums Chart, No. 27 on the Billboard Top 200 albums chart, and No. 47 in Canada. The song "Morning Dance" reached No. 17 in the UK Singles Chart, No. 1 on the US Adult Contemporary singles chart, No. 45 on the Canadian pop charts, and No. 6 on the Canadian AC charts. The album was certified gold in 1979, then platinum in 1987 by the RIAA. In addition to the band, the album featured guest musicians including trumpet player Randy Brecker, saxophonist Michael Brecker, guitarists John Tropea and Hiram Bullock, bassist Will Lee, drummer Steve Jordan and percussionist Rubens Bassini. Drummer Ted Reinhardt and guitarist Rick Strauss were in the band lineup during recording, but by the album's completion Chet Catallo joined on guitar. Jeremy Wall left the touring lineup but would continue to compose for the band. The sextet of Beckenstein, Schuman, Catallo, Kurzdorfer, Konikoff and Velez became the band's touring lineup in 1979, continuing into 1980.

=== 1980s ===
When Infinity Records folded, Catching the Sun was released on MCA in February 1980, becoming the No. 4 jazz album of 1980, peaking at No. 31 in the UK, and No. 80 in Canada. This album included the first composition for the group by Tom Schuman, who would become a regular writer along with Beckenstein and Wall, while other band members also contributed compositions. Bassist Jim Kurzdorfer left the group in 1980, replaced by David Wofford, and for a tour of Japan Sheila Escovedo temporarily replaced Velez on percussion. The group released their next album, Carnaval, in late 1980. Carnaval included the hit single penned by guitarist Chet Catallo, "Cafe Amore" which peaked in July of 1981 at 14 on the US Adult Contemporary Chart.

Catching the Sun was certified gold in 1985 by the RIAA, followed in 1987 by Carnaval. The group's next release was Freetime, in 1981.

Incognito (1982) featured as guests bassist Marcus Miller, drummer Steve Gadd, saxophonist Tom Scott, pianist Richard Tee, harmonica player Toots Thielemans, and pianist Jorge Dalto. City Kids (1983) introduced bassist Kim Stone, replacing Wofford. It was the first Spyro Gyra album recorded at BearTracks Studios, a studio in Suffern, NY established by Beckenstein in 1982.

The live album Access All Areas, recorded in Florida in November 1983, introduced marimba and vibraphone player Dave Samuels (who had guested on earlier tracks including the hits "Shaker Song" and "Morning Dance") as a full-time member of the band. After this album, Eli Konikoff and Chet Catallo left the group, to be replaced by drummer Richie Morales and guitarist Julio Fernández.

The new lineup (Beckenstein, Schuman, Fernández, Samuels, Stone, Morales, and Velez) recorded 1985's Alternating Currents, the band's first studio album to feature only the core lineup with no guest musicians. After percussionist Manolo Badrena, formerly of Weather Report and a previous guest musician on Spyro Gyra's albums, joined the band as a full-time member, replacing Velez, the group released the 1986 follow-up Breakout. Alternating Currents (1985) and Breakout (1986) would be among the Top 15 Jazz Albums in Billboard in 1986. Longtime co-producer Richard Calandra died in October 1986 of pancreatic cancer.

In 1987, Roberto Vally replaced Stone on bass for Stories Without Words, which would also be Manolo Badrena's final album with the band. Rites of Summer (1988) introduced bassist Oscar Cartaya, replacing Vally. Both Stories Without Words and Rites of Summer were among Billboard's Top 15 Contemporary Jazz Albums of 1988. On the 1989 album Point of View Julio Fernández was replaced by guitarist Jay Azzolina. Spyro Gyra ended the decade as Billboard's most successful jazz artist of the 1980s.

=== 1990s ===
Percussionist Marc Quiñones joined the group for Fast Forward (1990), though it would be his only album as a band member, and the last album for Richie Morales and Jay Azzolina. In 1990 the group performed temporarily without a guitarist, and with Tony Cintron replacing Morales on drums. Guitarist Julio Fernández rejoined the band for two new tracks included on the "best of" album, Collection, which also marked the debut of drummer Joel Rosenblatt.

Three Wishes (1992) introduced bassist Scott Ambush, replacing Cartaya. The following year's Dreams Beyond Control included guest appearances by former Santana vocalist Alex Ligertwood, marking the first appearance of lyrics on a Spyro Gyra album. After this album, Dave Samuels left the band to pursue solo projects, although he would guest with the band on later albums.

In 1995, the band released Love and Other Obsessions with guests Deniece Williams, Barrington Henderson, Billy Cliff, and a host of other backing vocalists and musicians, including Dave Samuels. This album would be the band's final 90s release to feature traditional R&B vocals. It was the first of a series of albums with the quintet lineup of Beckenstein, Schuman, Fernández, Ambush, and Rosenblatt, which lasted until 2004.

=== Recent years ===
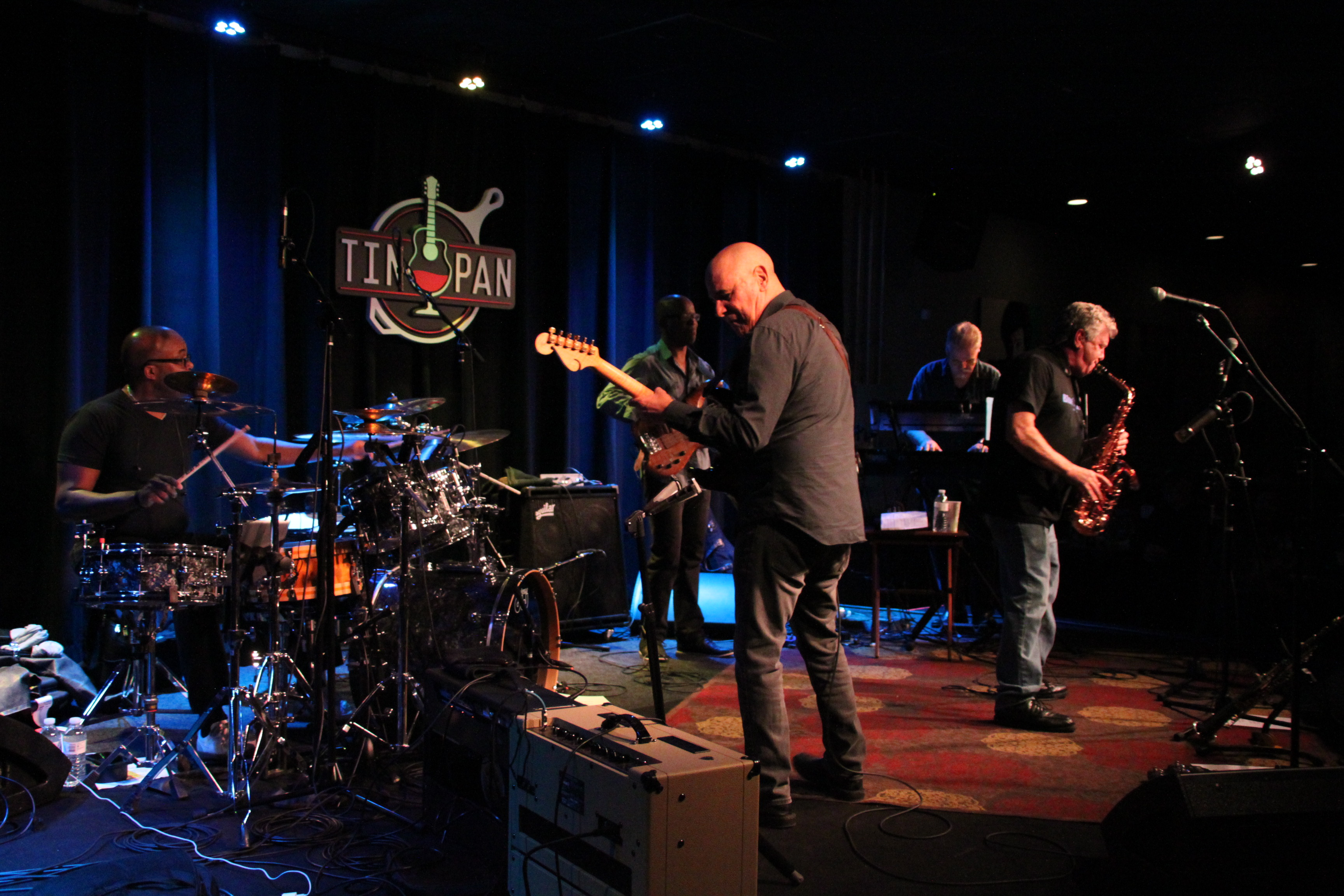
Spyro Gyra performs in Richmond, Virginia on February 23, 2017.

Drummer Joel Rosenblatt left the band during the making of The Deep End, leaving room for two other drummers, guest Billy Kilson and Ludwig Afonso, who became Rosenblatt's replacement. The band's next album, 2006's Wrapped in a Dream, was the first Spyro Gyra album since 1990's Fast Forward to be nominated for a Grammy Award. It would be the band's final album recorded at BearTracks Studios, which Beckenstein closed in 2006. Trinidadian Bonny Bonaparte (Bonny B) replaced Afonso as drummer for Good to Go-Go (2007), which received a Grammy nomination, as did A Night Before Christmas and Down the Wire (2009).

A Foreign Affair was released in 2011 and included Beckenstein, Schuman, Fernández, Ambush, and Bonny B, as well as guest vocalists Arijit Singh and Keb' Mo'. The album debuted at No. 2 on the Billboard jazz album chart. Bonaparte left the group due to health issues in November 2011 and was replaced on drums by Lee Pearson.

The Rhinebeck Sessions (2013) included Beckenstein, Schuman, Fernandez, Ambush, and Pearson. According to the group, it was written and recorded over three days in a recording studio in Rhinebeck, New York. In 2015, there was another change of drummers with Lionel Cordew replacing Pearson. Vinyl Tap (2019), the band's most recent record to date, was a departure as it had no original material, instead featuring the band's interpretations of classic rock and r&b songs from the 60's and 70's.

In 2020, with the band forced to stop touring due to the COVID-19 pandemic, the band uploaded a video to YouTube on June 23, 2020, featuring a medley of early hits "Shaker Song," "Catching the Sun" and "Morning Dance" synchronized from recordings of each band member at home. In 2021, the group resumed touring.

On December 19, 2022, the band announced on Facebook that Tom Schuman planned to move to Europe and would play his final shows with the band in February 2023. On December 28, 2022, the band announced that Chris Fischer would be their new keyboardist starting in March 2023.

In 2024, the group toured in celebration of its 50th anniversary.

== Former members ==
Original bassist Jim Kurzdorfer died of cancer on April 26, 2011.

Former drummer Ted Reinhardt died in an airplane crash on March 4, 2015, at the age of 63.

Mallet player Dave Samuels died on April 22, 2019, due to an undisclosed long-term illness.

Original former guitarist Freddy Rapillo died on March 24, 2021.

== Discography ==
=== Studio albums ===
Title	Label	Year released
Spyro Gyra	Infinity Records, Amherst	1978
Morning Dance	Infinity, Amherst	1979
Catching the Sun	MCA, Amherst	1980
Carnaval	MCA, Amherst	1980
Freetime	MCA, Amherst	1981
Incognito	MCA, Amherst	1982
City Kids	MCA, Amherst	1983
Alternating Currents	MCA, Amherst	1985
Breakout	MCA, Amherst	1986
Stories Without Words	MCA, Amherst	1987
Rites of Summer	MCA	1988
Point Of View	MCA	1989
Fast Forward	GRP	1990
Three Wishes	GRP	1992
Dreams Beyond Control	GRP	1993
Love and Other Obsessions	GRP	1995
Heart of the Night	GRP	1996
20/20	GRP	1997
Got the Magic	Windham Hill	1999
In Modern Times	Heads Up	2001
Original Cinema	Heads Up	2003
The Deep End	Heads Up	2004
Wrapped in a Dream	Heads Up	2006
Good to Go-Go	Heads Up	2007
A Night Before Christmas	Heads Up	2008
Down the Wire	Heads Up	2009
A Foreign Affair	Amherst	2011
The Rhinebeck Sessions	Crosseyed Bear	2013
Vinyl Tap	Amherst	2019

=== Live albums ===
Year recorded	Title	Label	Year released
1983	Access All Areas	MCA, Amherst	1984
1998	Road Scholars	GRP	1998
2022	Live in Leverkusen	Moosicus Records	2026

=== Compilations ===
Title	Label	Year released
Collection	GRP	1991
The Best of (The First Ten Years) / 1977-1987 (GRP)	GRP, Amherst	1997
The Very Best of Spyro Gyra	GRP	2002
(20th Century Masters) The Best Of Spyro Gyra: The Millennium Collection	Verve	2007
Best Of The Heads Up Years	Crosseyed Bear	2016
50/50	Amherst (Reservoir Recordings)	2024

== Awards and nominations ==
=== Grammy nominations ===
- Best Jazz Fusion Performance: Catching the Sun (1980), Incognito (1982), City Kids (1983), Access All Areas (1984), Alternating Currents (1985)
- Best Pop Instrumental Performance: "Shakedown" (1985), "Simple Pleasures" (2008)
- Best Pop Instrumental Album: Wrapped in a Dream (2007), Good to Go-Go (2008), A Night Before Christmas (2009), Down the Wire (2010)
- Best Rhythm & Blues Instrumental Performance: "Stripes" (1982)

=== Other awards ===
- George Benson Lifetime Achievement Award, Canadian Smooth Jazz Awards (2007)
