= Jay Azzolina =

American jazz guitarist (born 1952)

Jay Azzolina (born December 23, 1952) is an American jazz-fusion guitarist known for his work with the Grammy Award-winning group Spyro Gyra. He has also performed and recorded with Carly Simon, Donna Summer, The Manhattan Transfer, Herbie Mann, Rickie Lee Jones, and Chuck Mangione.

== Overview ==
Azzolina began his musical life playing trumpet and piano. At the age of eleven, he chose a guitar from his father's music store, and that became his primary interest. He spent a year studying classical guitar before attending the Berklee College of Music in Boston, where he studied under Pat Metheny. He released his first album, Never Too Late, in 1989.

In 1995, Azzolina received his M.F.A. degree from the Conservatory of Music at Purchase, New York. He soon began teaching there as well.

In 1997, he became a member of the John Patitucci Band and appeared on the albums, Past Tense (Double-Time, 2000), Live at One Station Plaza (2002), and The Rolling Stones Project (2005).

Azzolina released the solo album Local Dialect (2007) on Garagista Music.

== Discography ==
=== As leader ===
- Never Too Late (Antilles, 1988)
- Past Tense (Double-Time, 2000)
- Live at One Station Plaza (Azziz, 2002)
- Local Dialect (Gargista Music, 2007)

=== As sideman ===
- Grazyna Auguscik, Don't Let Me Go (GMA, 1996)
- Jeff Beal, Liberation (Antilles, 1987)
- Jeff Beal, Perpetual Motion (Antilles, 1989)
- Michael Franks, Barefoot on the Beach (Windham Hill, 1999)
- Michael Franks, Watching the Snow (Koch, 1993)
- Chuck Mangione, The Feeling's Back (Chesky, 1999)
- Spyro Gyra, Point of View (MCA, 1989)
- Spyro Gyra, Fast Forward (GRP, 1990)
- Harvie Swartz, It's About Time (Gaia, 1988)
- Carol Welsman, Alone Together (Welcar, 2015)
