= Gerardo Velez =

American musician (born 1947)

Gerardo "Jerry" Velez
- Born: August 15, 1947 (age 79); The Bronx, New York, U.S.
- Origin: The Bronx, New York, U.S.
- Genres: Jazz fusion, funk rock, soul, blues rock, electronic, hip hop
- Occupations: Musician, event producer, music director
- Instruments: Percussion, congas, drums, harmonica, vocals
- Years active: 1969–present
- Formerly of: Spyro Gyra; Gypsy Sun and Rainbows; Duran Duran; Chic

Gerardo "Jerry" Velez (born August 15, 1947) is an American musician of Puerto Rican descent. Best known for performing with American psychedelic rock musician Jimi Hendrix at Woodstock Festival in August 1969, Velez is a veteran percussionist and drummer, who has performed with many artists covering a number of different genres of music. He is also a common member of jazz fusion band Spyro Gyra.

== Life and career ==
Velez began his musical career in The Bronx, New York. He joined Jimi Hendrix's band Gypsy Sun and Rainbows in July 1969. They performed at the Woodstock Festival and at a small number of studio sessions, before Hendrix disbanded the group in favour of returning to the three-piece format of The Jimi Hendrix Experience. The band's performance at Woodstock was released on the live album Woodstock in 1994, followed by the live album and video Live at Woodstock in 1999. For all Hendrix releases on which he appears, Velez was credited with the nickname Jerry.

Since performing with Jimi Hendrix, Velez has continued to record and tour with high-profile artists, including David Bowie, Elton John and Duran Duran. According to his official website, Gerardo Velez has been nominated for seven Grammy Awards.

== Selected discography ==
with Jimi Hendrix

- Live at Woodstock (1969) – percussion

with Chic

- Live at the Budokan (1996) – percussion

with Christine Hayley

- Gone Fishin' (2002) – percussion

with Martha Veléz

- Hypnotized (1972) – conga

with Spyro Gyra

- Morning Dance (1979) – percussion, bongos, conga
- Catching the Sun (1980) – percussion
- Carnaval (1980) – percussion, bongos
- Incognito (1982) – percussion
- City Kids (1983) – percussion
- Access All Areas (1983) – percussion
- Alternating Currents (1985) – percussion
- Down the Wire (2009) – percussion

with David Bowie

- Black Tie White Noise (1993) – percussion
