= Jeremy Wall =

- Genre: Jazz
- Instrument: Piano
- Formerly of: Spyro Gyra

Jeremy Wall is a musician, and along with Jay Beckenstein, was a founding member of the jazz fusion band Spyro Gyra. He contributed to the group as a pianist, producer, and composer. He is currently an assistant professor in the Music Industry department at SUNY Oneonta.

== Background ==
Wall formed Spyro Gyra in the mid-1970s with classmate Jay Beckenstein. Although each took time off to attend college, the band stayed intact. Wall attended Columbia University, then moved to Buffalo where Beckenstein was attending college. Wall then moved to California to attend California Institute of the Arts, graduating with a B.F.A. in Music Composition. He later received an M.M. in Studio Composition from Purchase College in 2001. He has recorded extensively as producer, keyboardist, composer and arranger in all genres of music and has released over 70 of his own compositions. Wall has also been nominated for several Grammys as a producer, pianist and composer. His composition “Shakedown” was nominated for a Grammy award for “Best Pop Instrumental.” He was the featured soloist at the Shenandoah Bach Festival in 2004.

Wall worked as an adjunct professor at both Ramapo and Purchase College before joining SUNY Oneonta, where he teaches courses relating to contemporary issues in the music industry and songwriting. He also leads the jazz funk band. These classes draw upon Wall's history with Spyro Gyra and his experience in the music industry.

== Currently ==
Wall, along with the SUNY Oneonta Funk Band ensemble, often plays music on campus and in the surrounding area.

== Discography ==
- Cool Running (Amherst, 1991)
- Stepping Into the New World (Amherst, 1992)

With Spyro Gyra

- 1978 Spyro Gyra
- 1979 Morning Dance
- 1980 Catching the Sun
- 1980 Carnaval
- 1981 Freetime
- 1982 Incognito
- 1983 City Kids
- 1984 Access All Areas
- 1985 Alternating Currents
- 1986 Breakout
- 1987 Stories Without Words
- 1988 Rites of Summer
- 1989 Point of View
- 1990 Fast Forward
- 1992 Three Wishes
- 1993 Dreams Beyond Control
- 1995 Love and Other Obsessions
- 1996 Heart of the Night
- 1997 20/20

With Richard Stoltzman

- 1991 Brasil
- 1991 Begin Sweet World
- 1992 Hark!
- 1995 Visions
- 1994 Dreams
- 1996 Spirits
- 1998 Danza Latina
- 1998 Open Sky
- 2000 World Beat Bach

With others

- 1979 In a Temple Garden, Yusef Lateef (CTI)
- 1980 Body Language, Patti Austin
- 1989 The Complete Recordings, Fuse One
- 1996 Imagine, Ofra Harnoy
