= BearTracks Studios =

Recording studio complex in New York State

Coordinates: 41.1649°N 74.097°W

- Type: Recording studio
- Industry: Sound recording
- Founded: 1982
- Defunct: 2006
- Headquarters: Suffern, New York, U.S.
- Owner: Jay Beckenstein

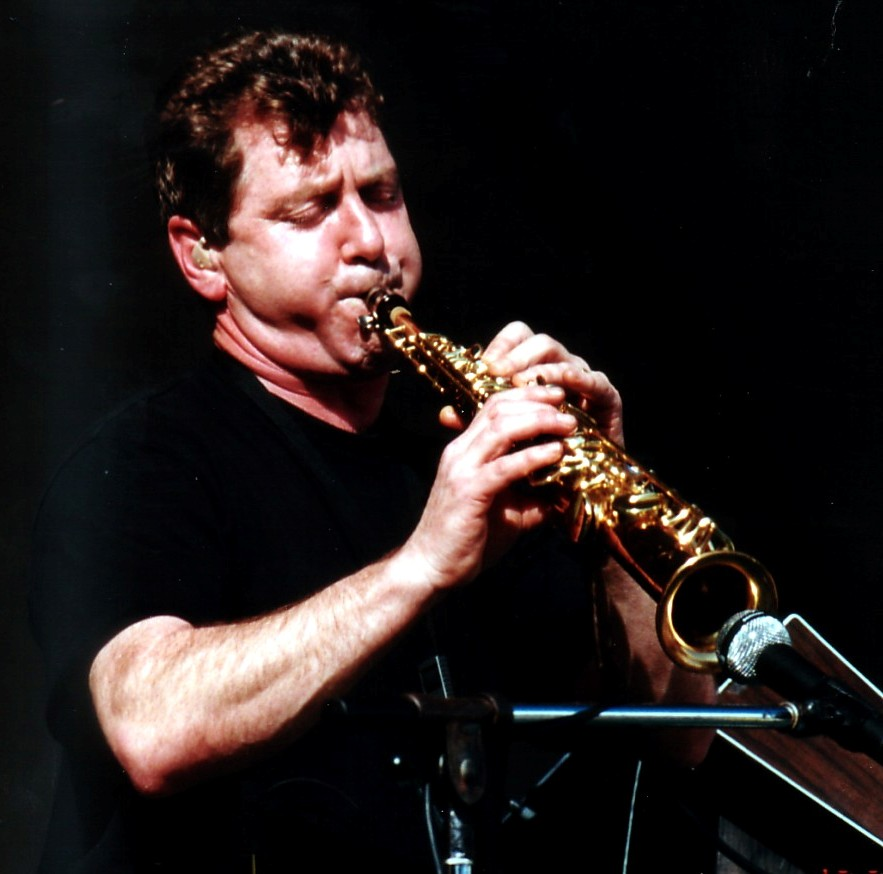
Jay Beckenstein, owner of BearTracks and co-founder of the band Spyro Gyra

BearTracks Recording Studio was a recording studio complex in Suffern, New York, owned by Jay Beckenstein of Spyro Gyra and built in the early 1980s. Operating from 1982 at 926 Haverstraw Road in Suffern, the studio is no longer in business. It was announced that BearTracks would cease operation shortly after Spyro Gyra recorded their 2006 album Wrapped in a Dream.

A dark and faint photograph of the building that holds the studio can be seen on the tray card of Dream Theater's album Metropolis Pt. 2: Scenes from a Memory. The surrounding property was also the location for some of the band's videos associated with the album.

== Clients ==
- Spyro Gyra
- Ace Frehley
- Dream Theater
- Seth Regan
- Jonatha Brooke
- Goo Goo Dolls
- Gabriela Anders
- FireHouse
- Leon Parker
- Phil Ramone
- Nile Rodgers
- Michael Barbiero
- Barry Eastmond
- Andy Johns
- Elliot Scheiner
- George Benson
- Chris Botti
- Julian Lennon
- Mariah Carey
- Wolfgang Haffner
- Jason Miles
- Bob James
- Jennifer Kimball
- Bruce Hornsby
- Mark S. Berry
- David Wilcox
- Cassandra Wilson
- Patty Larkin
- Adam Cohen
- Joe Ferla
- Foreigner
- Gigolo Aunts
- Kirk Whalum
- Hot Tuna
- Chuck Loeb
- David Clayton Thomas
- The Story
- Renee Rosnes
- Yanni
- David Broza
- Jonathan Butler
- Harlem Boys Choir
- Charlie Hunter
- The Band
- Stretch Princess
- John Alagia
- Gary Moore
- Imaginary Road
- Dry Kill Logic
- 10,000 Maniacs
- Rosanne Cash
- Primer 55
- Days of the New
- Immature
- Richard Stoltzman
- Judy Collins
- Thrice
- S.A. Sanctuary
- Anthrax
- H_{2}O
- Strangefolk
- The Wayouts
