= Julio Fernández (musician) =

Cuban-American guitarist and composer

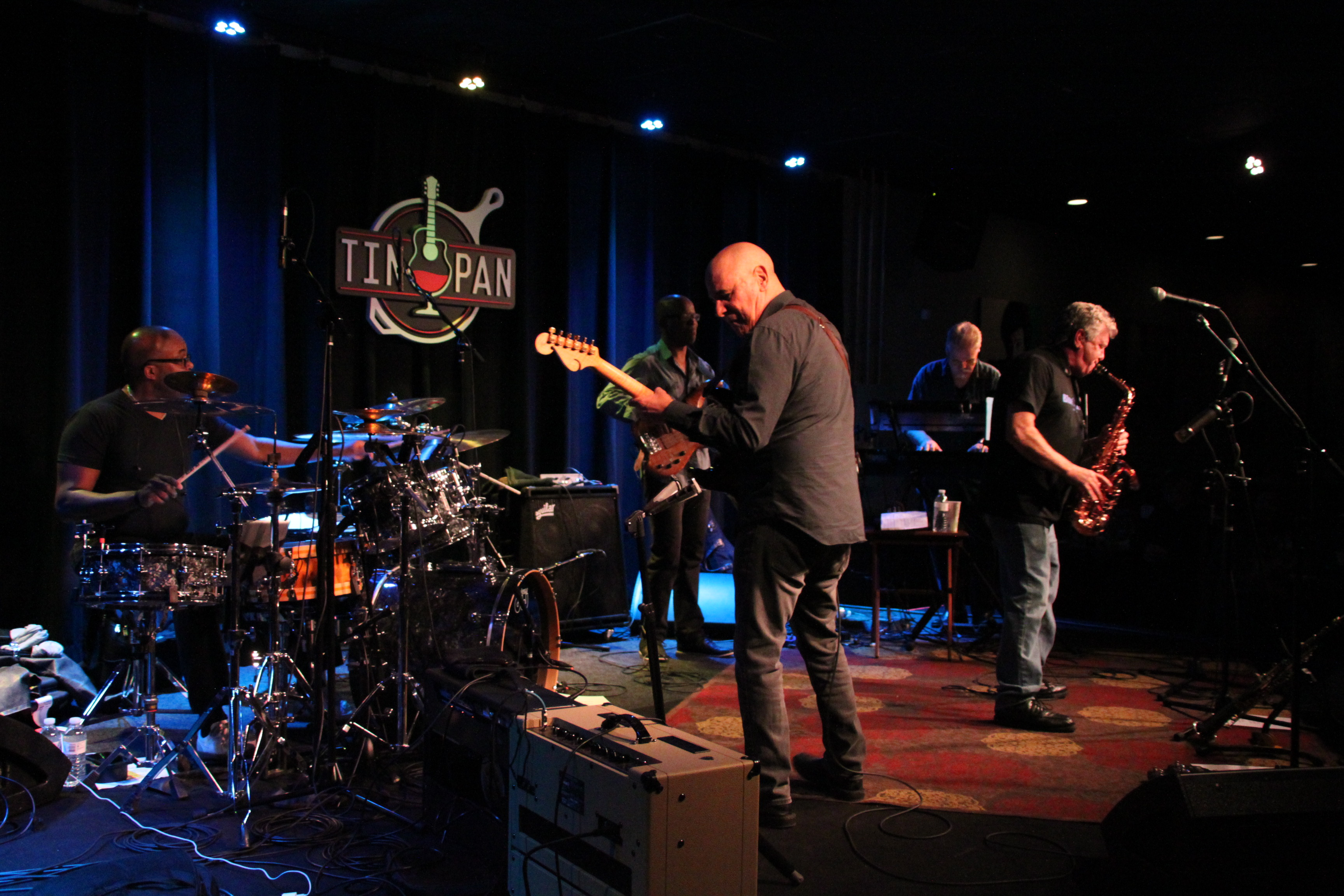
Fernández, center, performing with Spyro Gyra in Richmond, Virginia, on February 23, 2017.

Barbaro Julio Fernández (born August 29, 1954) is a Cuban-American guitarist and composer best known as the current and longtime guitarist for the jazz-fusion band Spyro Gyra.

Fernández was born in Havana, Cuba, but grew up in Hoboken, New Jersey, where he started playing guitar at the age of nine. At Hoboken High School, Fernández played tuba in the school band. The first band he played for outside of school was The Meteors, a group composed of some neighborhood kids Fernández grew up with in Hoboken. Before finding paid work as a musician, Fernández worked at various times as a clothing salesman, a messenger in a law firm, a newspaper delivery man and a labourer in a coat factory. Fernández graduated from Hoboken High School in 1972 and attended Montclair State University on scholarship as a music education major, but dropped out after the first semester of his second year to pursue his dream of playing music professionally.

With Fernández's career at a standstill in 1984, his friend Gerardo Velez, Fernández's collaborator on various projects and the percussionist for Spyro Gyra at that time, told him the band was looking for a new guitarist. Fernández auditioned and was hired the next day—an event he described as "one of the happiest days of my life." Except for a two-year hiatus at the end of that decade, Fernandez has continued in that position, contributing on 24 of the band's 31 albums.

Fernández has also worked for a variety of other musicians, including Bernie Williams, Chuck Loeb, Dave Samuels, Phoebe Snow, Richie Cannata, David Broza, Eric Marienthal, B.B. King, Emmanuel and Marion Meadows.

Since 2012, Fernández has been involved with Voices Of Valor, an organization that provides therapeutic songwriting programs for veterans.
