= Jay Beckenstein =

American saxophonist, composer, and producer

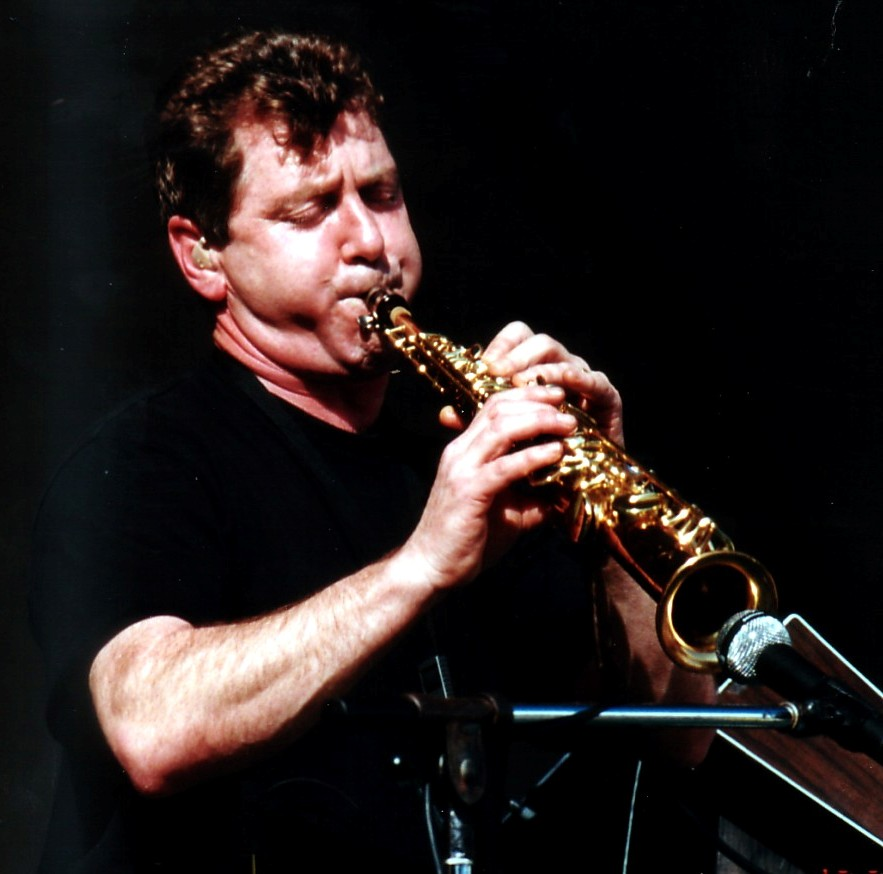
- Beckenstein, Gulfstream Park, Hallandale, Florida

Background information
- Born: May 14, 1951 (age 75); Brooklyn, New York, U.S.
- Genres: Smooth jazz, jazz fusion
- Occupations: Musician, composer, producer
- Instrument: Saxophone
- Years active: 1974–present
- Label: Windham Hill
- Spouse: Jennifer Johnson (m. 1984; div. 2006)
- Website: jaybeckenstein.com

Jay Barnet Beckenstein (born May 14, 1951) is an American saxophonist, composer, producer, and the co-founder of the band Spyro Gyra. He owned BearTracks Studios in Suffern, New York.

== Music career ==
Beckenstein was born in Long Island, New York, to a Jewish family. His mother, Lorraine, was an opera singer and his father, Leonard, loved jazz and introduced him to Charlie Parker and Lester Young when he was a baby. He started playing the piano at age five when he moved to Farmingdale, New York. He was given his first saxophone at the age of seven. In his senior year of high school, he and his family moved to Germany. He attended and graduated from Nürnberg American High School in 1969. He has said that being Jewish in Germany was positive at the time. However, he has recalled that he once saw an old photo of an elderly neighbor in his SS Nazi uniform while visiting him and he never went back. He received a college degree in music from the University at Buffalo in 1973. Trumpeter Dizzy Gillespie once played with the college band while Beckenstein was a band member.

They soon recruited 16-year-old keyboardist Tom Schuman and recorded their debut album. However, due to lack of funds, the record was going to be their last album until they gave it away and sold 100,000 copies. From there, they got a deal and released their next album in 1979.

In 2000, Beckenstein released his first solo album, Eye Contact, which charted No. 23 on the Top Contemporary Jazz Albums.

Beckenstein played the saxophone solo on American progressive metal band Dream Theater's "Another Day", from the album Images and Words, and single version of song "Through her Eyes", from the album Metropolis Pt. 2: Scenes from a Memory. He also played a solo part in "Take Away My Pain" on the live album Once in a Livetime as well as "Another Day" during the performance of Metropolis 2000: Scenes from New York.

== Personal life ==
In 1984, Beckenstein married Jennifer Johnson from Portland, Oregon; with whom he has three children (daughters Claire, Alexandra and Isabel). At the time he also had two German Shepherds, three cats and two guinea pigs. Most of his life is filled with his love for painting, gardening, hiking and all things outdoors. After marriage years, Beckenstein is divorced in 2006.

== Discography ==
Solo

- 2000: Eye Contact (Windham Hill)

With Bob James

- 1981 All Around the Town
- 1981 Sign of the Times
- 1982 Hands Down

With Dream Theater

- 1992 Images and Words
- 1993 Live at the Marquee
- 1998 Once in a LIVEtime
- 2000 Through Her Eyes
- 2001 Live Scenes from New York

With Jason Miles

- 1996 Mr. X
- 2000 A Love Affair: The Music of Ivan Lins
- 2000 Celebrating the Music of Weather Report
- 2002 Brazilian Nights
- 2002 To Grover, With Love
- 2006 What's Going On?

With others

- 1980 Orleans, Orleans
- 1989 Away from Home, David Broza
- 1990 Extremities, Tom Schuman
- 1991 Natural Selection, Dave Samuels
- 1995 Basia on Broadway, Basia
- 1995 David Broza, David Broza
- 1997 Deep in the Night, Rick Rhodes
- 1999 Listen, Chuck Loeb
- 1999 Somewhere in the Night, Mercedes Hall
- 2001 Butterfly, Special EFX
- 2002 Urban Life, The V.I.P. Club
- 2003 In the Name of Love, Freddy Cole
- 2012 The Fusion Syndicate, The Fusion Syndicate
