= Tom Schuman =

American musician

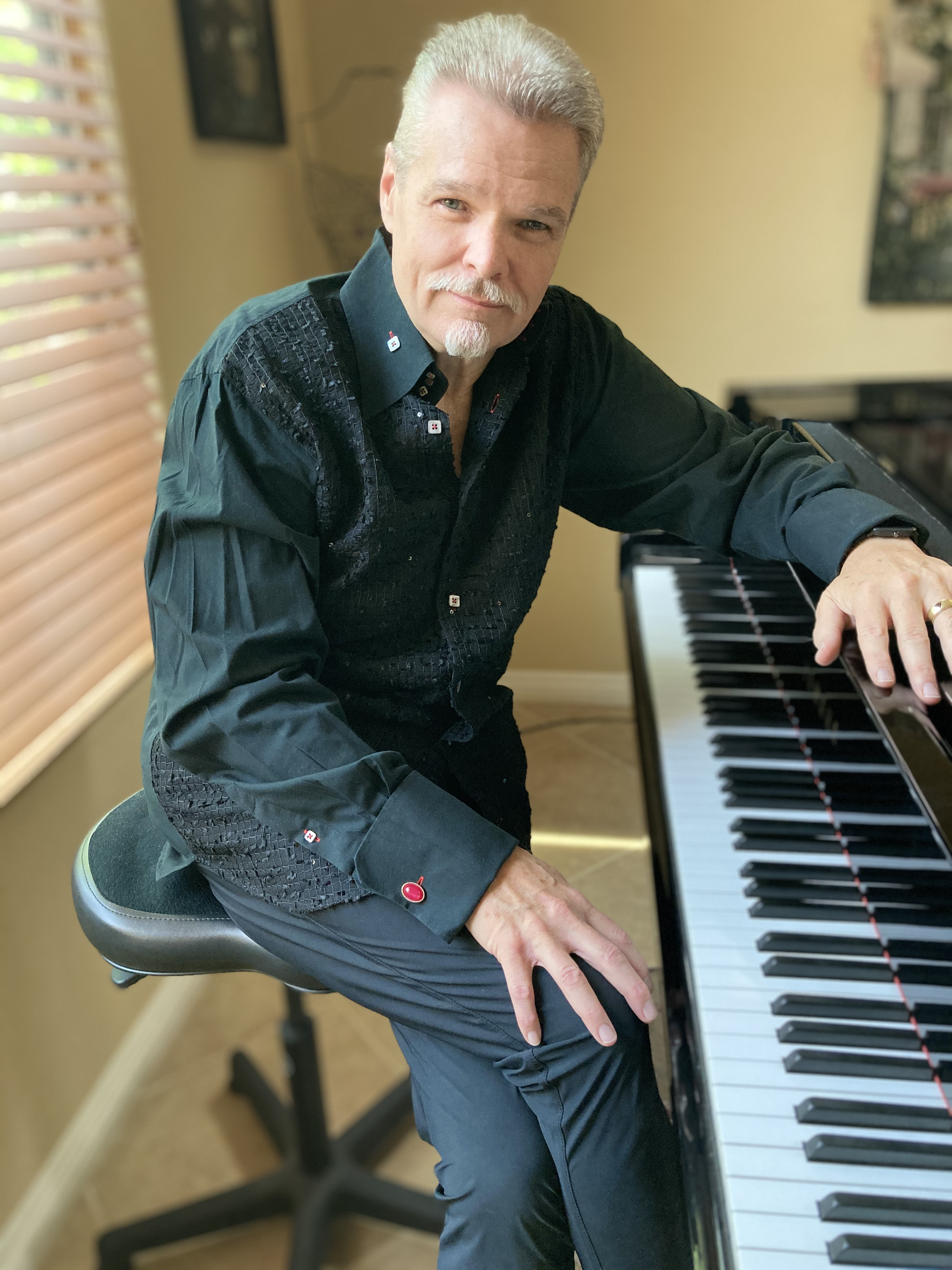

Background information
- Born: January 31, 1958 (age 68)
- Genre: Smooth jazz
- Occupations: Musician, composer, arranger
- Instrument: Piano
- Labels: GRP; JazzBridge; Namma
- Formerly of: Birthright; Spyro Gyra; Gamalon; Tom Schuman Trio

Thomas William Schuman (born January 31, 1958) is an American jazz pianist, smooth jazz keyboardist and was the longtime co-leader, composer and arranger of 13 Grammy nominated contemporary jazz group, Spyro Gyra. He has been the keyboardist for Spyro Gyra since he was 16 years old (before the release of their first album). He has performed on all of Spyro Gyra's albums to date and has written or co-written over sixty Spyro Gyra compositions since the album Catching the Sun (MCA, 1980). At the end of 2022, Schuman announced his resignation from Spyro Gyra, effective March 2023, in order to move to Europe.

Tom also produced 7 solo albums on his own label. He also built and engineers his own recording studio.

== Discography ==
Solo

- Extremities (GRP, 1990)
- Schuman Nature (JazzBridge, 2003)
- Into Your Heart (JazzBridge, 2002)
- Deep Chill (JazzBridge, 2006)
- Reflections Over Time (JazzBridge, 2010)
- Designated Planets (JazzBridge, 2013)
- Live At Marians Jazzroom (JazzBridge, 2018)
- Live At Marians Jazzroom - Second Set (JazzBridge, 2022)
- I Am Schuman (Namma Music, 2024)

With Spyro Gyra

- Spyro Gyra (Amherst Records, 1978)
- Morning Dance (MCA, 1979)
- Catching The Sun (MCA, 1980)
- Carnaval (MCA, 1980)
- Freetime (MCA, 1981)
- Incognito (MCA, 1982)
- City Kids (MCA, 1983)
- Access All Areas (MCA, 1984)
- Alternating Currents (MCA, 1985)
- Breakout (MCA, 1986)
- Stories Without Words (MCA, 1987)
- Rights Of Summer (GRP, 1988)
- Point Of View (GRP, 1989)
- Fast Forward (GRP, 1990)
- Three Wishes (GRP, 1992)
- Dreams Beyond Control (GRP, 1993)
- Love And Other Obsessions (GRP, 1995)
- Heart Of The Night (GRP, 1996)
- 20/20 (GRP, 1997)
- Road Scholars (GRP, 1997)
- Got The Magic (Windham Hill, 1999)
- In Modern Times (Heads Up, 2001)
- Original Cinema (Heads Up, 2003)
- The Deep End (Heads Up, 2004)
- Wrapped In A Dream (Heads Up, 2006)
- Good To Go Go (Heads Up, 2007)
- A Night Before Christmas (Heads Up, 2008)
- Down The Wire (Heads Up, 2009)
- A Foreign Affair (Amherst, 2011)
- The Rhinebeck Sessions (Crosseyed Bear, 2013)
- Vinyl Tap (Amherst, 2019)

With Gamalon

- Gamalon (1987)
- High Contrast (1991)

With Jason Miles

- Celebrating the Music of Weather Report (2000)
- To Grover, With Love (2002)

With Steve Oliver

- Positive Energy (2002)
- 3D (2004)
- Radiant (2006)

With others

- On the Way, Justin Young (2007)
- Heart Song, Al Williams (2008)
- Let It Ride, Jeff Kashiwa (2012)
- Beyond the Light, Adonis Mitzelos (2000)
- In a Temple Garden, Yusef Lateef (1979)
- Breath Of Life, Birthright (1976)
- Who Is Blair, Barney Perry (1978)
