= The Dream 1973–2011 =

Compilation album by Michael Franks
- Released: 3 April 2012
- Recorded: 1973–2011
- Genre: Jazz; vocal jazz; smooth jazz
- Language: English
- Label: Warner Music France

Michael Franks chronology
Time Together (2011)	The Dream 1973–2011 (2012)	The Music in My Head (2018)

The Dream 1973–2011 is a jazz vocal boxed set album by Michael Franks, released in 2012 with Warner Music France.

The compilation includes 72 tracks over five discs with recordings spanning Franks' career with Warner Bros and earlier, from Michael Franks (re-released as Previously Unavailable) in 1973, to Time Together 2011. The fifth disc is a re-release of the relatively rare Michael Franks with Crossfire Live album recorded in Australia in 1980.

== Track listing ==
All tracks are written by Michael Franks except where noted.

Disc one (Pop & Funky Grooves)
No.	Title	Writer(s)	Length
1.	"Can't Seem to Shake This Rock 'n' Roll" (from Michael Franks, 1973)		4:17
2.	"Born with the Moon in Virgo" (from Michael Franks, 1973)		6:12
3.	"Monkey See, Monkey Do" (from The Art of Tea, 1976)		3:31
4.	"B'wana—He No Home" (from Sleeping Gypsy, 1977)		4:54
5.	"When the Cookie Jar Is Empty" (from Burchfield Nines, 1978)		5:08
6.	"All Dressed Up (With Nowhere to Go)" (from One Bad Habit, 1980)		3:46
7.	"Jealousy" (from Objects of Desire, 1983)		3:33
8.	"Laughing Gas" (from Objects of Desire, 1983)		3:22
9.	"Alone at Night" (from Passionfruit, 1983)		4:27
10.	"When Sly Calls (Don't Touch That Phone)" (from Passionfruit, 1983)		5:47
11.	"Your Secret's Safe with Me" (from Skin Dive, 1985)		4:36
12.	"Woman in the Waves" (from Blue Pacific, 1990)		5:57
13.	"Barefoot on the Beach" (from Barefoot on the Beach, 1999)	Franks, Charles Blenzig	5:02
14.	"Somehow Our Love Survives" (from Abandoned Garden, 1995)	Franks, Joe Sample	4:56
15.	"Practice Makes Perfect" (from Dragonfly Summer, 1993)		4:52
16.	"Now That Your Joystick's Broke" (from Passionfruit, 1983)		2:48
17.	"The Dream" (from Dragonfly Summer, 1993)	Franks, Russell Ferrante, Jimmy Haslip, Marc Russo	5:15

Disc two (Jazz & Exotic Summer)
No.	Title	Writer(s)	Length
1.	"Monk's New Tune" (from Dragonfly Summer, 1993)		5:41
2.	"Hearing Take Five" (from Rendezvous in Rio, 2006)		5:38
3.	"Don't Be Blue" (from Sleeping Gypsy, 1977)	Franks, John Guerin	3:28
4.	"When You Smiled at Me" (from Barefoot on the Beach, 1999)		5:02
5.	"Popsicle Toes" (from The Art of Tea, 1976)		4:30
6.	"Sanpaku" (from Tiger in the Rain, 1979)		4:11
7.	"Eggplant" (from The Art of Tea, 1976)		3:36
8.	"Sometimes I Just Forget to Smile" (from The Art of Tea, 1976)		3:47
9.	"Mice" (from Time Together, 2011)		5:24
10.	"Rendezvous in Rio" (from Rendezvous in Rio, 2006)	Charles Blenzig, Franks	5:32
11.	"The Way We Celebrate New Year's" (from Watching the Snow, 2004)		6:21
12.	"Under the Sun" (from Rendezvous in Rio, 2006)		5:22
13.	"Tell Me All About It" (from Passionfruit, 1983)		4:27
14.	"Tahitian Moon" (from Objects of Desire, 1982)		4:33
15.	"Like Water, Like Wind" (from Abandoned Garden, 1995)		5:18
16.	"The Art of Love" (from Blue Pacific, 1990)		4:10

Disc three (Soft & Cool School)
No.	Title	Writer(s)	Length
1.	"Dragonfly Summer" (from Dragonfly Summer, 1993)		5:00
2.	"Nightmoves" (from The Art of Tea, 1976)		3:59
3.	"Lotus Blossom" (from One Bad Habit, 1980)	Franks, Don Grolnick	4:15
4.	"The Lady Wants to Know" (from Sleeping Gypsy, 1977)		4:41
5.	"On My Way Home to You" (from One Bad Habit, 1980)		4:49
6.	"Living on the Inside" (from Tiger in the Rain, 1979)		5:36
7.	"String of Pearls" (from Dragonfly Summer, 1993)		4:31
8.	"One Day in St. Tropez" (from Time Together, 2011)		5:18
9.	"Hourglass" (from Abandoned Garden, 1995)		4:42
10.	"Rainy Night in Tokyo" (from Passionfruit, 1983)		4:36
11.	"Never Say Die" (from Passionfruit, 1983)		3:35
12.	"All I Need" (from Blue Pacific, 1990)		4:45
13.	"Like Moon Behind a Cloud" (from Barefoot on the Beach, 1999)		6:20
14.	"Blue Pacific" (from Blue Pacific, 1990)		4:54
15.	"Still Life" (from One Bad Habit, 1980)		4:12
16.	"The Cool School" (from Rendezvous in Rio, 2006)		5:42

Disc four (Rarities & Previously Unreleased Tracks + Duets & Covers)
No.	Title	Writer(s)	Length
1.	"Comin' Home to You" (From the movie Author! Author!)	Dave Grusin, Marilyn Bergman, Alan Bergman	4:01
2.	"Jealousy" (Geyster Remix)		4:20
3.	"Blue Pacific" (Alternate version)		4:54
4.	"This Will Never Do" (From the musical Noa Noa)		5:29
5.	"Somewhere in the Rain" (from Over the Sky: Yuming International Cover Album, 2003)	Yumi Arai, Franks, Charles Blenzig	5:47
6.	"I Bought You a Plastic Star for Your Aluminum Tree" (from Jazz Christmas Party, 1997)		4:56
7.	"Foolish Heart" (from Departure by Bob Mintzer, 1993)	Victor Young, Ned Washington	5:19
8.	"Antonio's Song / The Rainbow" (from Angel Whisper by Anri, 1996)		5:24
9.	"Leading Me Back to You" (from Spellbound by Joe Sample, 1989)		5:02
10.	"(Think…) Where Are You Goin?" (from One by Me Phi Me, 1992 (Me Phi Me, CeeCeeTee))		4:29
11.	"Ladies' Nite" (from Objects of Desire, 1983)		4:09
12.	"When I Give My Love To You" (from Skin Dive, 1985)		4:20
13.	"Now Love Has No End" (from Barefoot on the Beach, 1999)		6:09
14.	"Island Christmas" (from Watching the Snow, 2004)		5:41
15.	"Popsicle Toes" (from Coming Out by The Manhattan Transfer, 1976)		4:15
16.	"Nightmoves" (from Just Family by Dee Dee Bridgewater, 1977)		3:13

Disc five (With Crossfire Live)
No.	Title	Writer(s)	Length
1.	"Don't Be Blue"	Franks, John Guerin
2.	"When the Cookie Jar is Empty"		6:35
3.	"The Lady Wants to Know"		6:05
4.	"B'Wana—He No Home"		4:59
5.	"Chain Reaction"	Franks, Joe Sample	4:28
6.	"Antonio's Song"		4:43
7.	"Monkey See, Monkey Do"		6:22
8.	"Popsicle Toes"		5:02

== Reception ==
AllMusic writers rated the original source albums with between two and a half and four stars. The compilation album is available on their online catalogue, but has yet to be rated.
