= The Michael Franks Anthology: The Art of Love =

Compilation album by Michael Franks
- Released: May 12, 2003
- Recorded: 1976 – 1999
- Genre: Jazz; vocal jazz; smooth jazz
- Length: 2:26:41
- Label: Warner Bros.

Michael Franks chronology
Barefoot on the Beach (1999)	The Michael Franks Anthology: The Art of Love (2003)	Watching the Snow (2003)

The Michael Franks Anthology: The Art of Love is a jazz vocal double album by Michael Franks, released in 2003 by Warner Bros. It is Franks' eighteenth album, and his third compilation after his non-U.S.A. Indispensable released in 1988 and The Best of Michael Franks: A Backward Glance in 1998.

The compilation contains a selection of tracks over two discs spanning twenty three years, from The Art of Tea in 1976, to Barefoot on the Beach in 1999.

== Track listing ==
All tracks are written by Michael Franks, except where noted.

Disc one
No.	Title	Writer(s)	Length
1.	"Eggplant" (from The Art of Tea, 1976)		3:37
2.	"Popsicle Toes" (from The Art of Tea, 1976)		4:34
3.	"The Lady Wants to Know" (from Sleeping Gypsy, 1977)		4:44
4.	"B'wana—He No Home" (from Sleeping Gypsy, 1977)		4:56
5.	"Antonio's Song (The Rainbow)" (from Sleeping Gypsy, 1977)		5:04
6.	"When the Cookie Jar Is Empty" (from Burchfield Nines, 1978)		5:09
7.	"Meet Me in the Deerpark" (from Burchfield Nines, 1978)		5:58
8.	"Living on the Inside" (from Tiger in the Rain, 1979)		5:38
9.	"Sanpaku" (from Tiger in the Rain, 1979)		4:12
10.	"Tiger in the Rain" (from Tiger in the Rain, 1979)		4:18
11.	"When It's Over" (from Tiger in the Rain, 1979)		3:04
12.	"On My Way Home to You" (from One Bad Habit, 1980)		4:50
13.	"Inside You" (from One Bad Habit, 1980)		4:12
14.	"Lotus Blossom" (from One Bad Habit, 1980)	Franks, Don Grolnick	4:17
15.	"Don't Be Blue" (from Michael Franks with Crossfire Live, 1980)	Franks, John Guerin	3:41
16.	"Monkey See—Monkey Do" (from Michael Franks with Crossfire Live, 1980)		6:32
Total length:			74:46

Disc two
No.	Title	Writer(s)	Length
1.	"Tahitian Moon" (from Objects of Desire, 1982)		4:36
2.	"Flirtation" (from Objects of Desire, 1982)		3:42
3.	"When Sly Calls (Don't Touch That Phone)" (from Passionfruit, 1983)		5:52
4.	"Rainy Night in Tokyo" (from Passionfruit, 1983)		4:42
5.	"Sunday Morning Here With You" (from Passionfruit, 1983)		4:34
6.	"Your Secret's Safe With Me" (from Skin Dive, 1985)		4:39
7.	"When I Give My Love to You" (from Skin Dive, 1985)		4:26
8.	"Read My Lips" (from Skin Dive, 1985)		3:43
9.	"Innuendo" (from The Camera Never Lies, 1987)		5:54
10.	"Leading Me Back to You" (from Spellbound, 1989)	Franks, Joe Sample	5:06
11.	"The Art of Love" (from Blue Pacific, 1990)		4:10
12.	"The Dream" (from Dragonfly Summer, 1993)	Franks, Russell Ferrante, Jimmy Haslip, Marc Russo	5:14
13.	"Monk's New Tune" (from Dragonfly Summer, 1993)		5:43
14.	"Somehow Our Love Survives" (from Abandoned Garden, 1995)	Franks, Joe Sample	5:00
15.	"Mr. Smooth" (from Barefoot on the Beach, 1999)		4:39
Total length:			71:56

== Reception ==
Professional ratings
Review scores
Source	Rating
AllMusic	4/5 stars

Writing for AllMusic, Stephen Thomas Erlewine commented, "All the hits are here, along with a sharp selection of album tracks, pretty much rounding up all the highlights from his rich, extensive career. Diehards will still want the albums, but serious fans who want just one Michael Franks album will need this."
