= Love Songs (Michael Franks album) =

Compilation album by Michael Franks
- Released: January 27, 2004
- Recorded: 1976 – 1995
- Genre: Jazz; vocal jazz; smooth jazz
- Length: 1:11:50
- Label: Warner Bros.

Michael Franks chronology
| Watching the Snow (2003) | Love Songs (2004) | Rendezvous in Rio (2006) |

Professional ratings
Review scores
| Source | Rating |
|---|---|
| AllMusic | 4.5/5 stars |

Love Songs is a jazz vocal album by singer-songwriter Michael Franks, released in 2004 with Warner Bros. It is Franks' twentieth album, and his fourth and compilation after Indispensable: The Best of Michael Franks in 1988, The Best of Michael Franks: A Backward Glance in 1998 and The Michael Franks Anthology: The Art of Love in 2003.

The compilation contains a selection of tracks spanning almost two decades, from The Art of Tea in 1976, to Abandoned Garden in 1995.

== Track listing ==
All tracks are written by Michael Franks except where noted.

| No. | Title | Writer(s) | Length |
|---|---|---|---|
| 1. | "The Lady Wants to Know" (from Sleeping Gypsy, 1977) | | 4:44 |
| 2. | "When I Give My Love to You" (from Skin Dive, 1985) | | 4:26 |
| 3. | "Tell Me All About It" (from Passionfruit, 1983) | | 4:34 |
| 4. | "Sunday Morning Here with You" (from Passionfruit, 1983) | | 4:34 |
| 5. | "Tahitian Moon" (from Objects of Desire, 1982) | | 4:36 |
| 6. | "Now I Know Why (They Call It Falling)" (from Skin Dive, 1985) | | 4:56 |
| 7. | "On My Way Home to You" (from One Bad Habit, 1980) | | 4:50 |
| 8. | "Popsicle Toes" (from The Art of Tea, 1976) | | 4:34 |
| 9. | "Meet Me in the Deerpark" (from Burchfield Nines, 1978) | | 5:58 |
| 10. | "Living on the Inside" (from Tiger in the Rain, 1979) | | 5:37 |
| 11. | "Rainy Night in Tokyo" (from Passionfruit, 1983) | | 4:42 |
| 12. | "Vivaldi's Song" (from Burchfield Nines, 1978) | | 4:12 |
| 13. | "Mr. Blue" (from The Art of Tea, 1976) | | 4:02 |
| 14. | "When the Cookie Jar Is Empty" (from Burchfield Nines, 1978) | | 5:10 |
| 15. | "Somehow Our Love Survives" (from Abandoned Garden, 1995) | Franks, Joe Sample | 5:00 |
