= The Best of Michael Franks: A Backward Glance =

Compilation album by Michael Franks
- Released: May 12, 1998
- Recorded: 1976 – 1995
- Genre: Jazz; vocal jazz; smooth jazz
- Length: 69:02
- Label: Warner Bros.

Michael Franks chronology
Abandoned Garden (1995)	The Best of Michael Franks: A Backward Glance (1998)	Barefoot on the Beach (1999)

The Best of Michael Franks: A Backward Glance is a jazz vocal album by Michael Franks released in 1998 with Warner Bros. It is Franks' sixteenth album, and his second compilation after his import-only Indispensable: The Best of Michael Franks released a decade prior.

The compilation contains a selection of tracks spanning almost two decades, from The Art of Tea in 1976, to Abandoned Garden in 1995.

== Track listing ==
All tracks are written by Michael Franks, unless otherwise stated.

No.	Title	Writer(s)	Original album	Length
1.	"Popsicle Toes"		The Art of Tea (1976)	4:35
2.	"Eggplant"		The Art of Tea	3:37
3.	"The Lady Wants To Know"		Sleeping Gypsy (1977)	4:44
4.	"Antonio's Song (The Rainbow)"		Sleeping Gypsy	5:03
5.	"When the Cookie Jar Is Empty"		Burchfield Nines (1978)	5:10
6.	"Tiger In The Rain"		Tiger in the Rain (1979)	4:20
7.	"Baseball"	Michael Franks; John Lewis	One Bad Habit (1980)	3:49
8.	"Love Duet"		Objects of Desire (1982)	4:59
9.	"When Sly Calls (Don't Touch That Phone)"		Passionfruit (1983)	5:53
10.	"Your Secret's Safe With Me"		Skin Dive (1985)	4:39
11.	"When I Give My Love To You"		Skin Dive	4:26
12.	"Island Life"	Michael Franks; Rob Mounsey	The Camera Never Lies (1987)	4:22
13.	"The Art Of Love"		Blue Pacific (1990)	4:12
14.	"Soul Mate"		Dragonfly Summer (1993)	4:28
15.	"Hourglass"		Abandoned Garden (1995)	4:45
Total length:				69:02

== Reception ==
Professional ratings
Review scores
Source	Rating
AllMusic	4.5/5 stars

Writing for AllMusic, Stephen Thomas Erlewine commented that "[a]ny curious listener looking for a one-stop introduction to Franks would be well served with this collection".
