= Michael Franks: Original Album Series =

Box set by Michael Franks
- Released: November 27, 2010
- Recorded: 1976–1980
- Genre: Smooth jazz
- Length: 3:10:11
- Label: Rhino
- Producer: Tommy LiPuma; John Simon

Michael Franks chronology
| Rendezvous in Rio (2006) | Michael Franks: Original Album Series (2010) | Time Together (2011) |

Michael Franks: Original Album Series is a music box set by jazz musician Michael Franks, first released in 2010 in the United Kingdom as part of Rhino's Original Album Series. It includes five of his earlier studio albums in cardboard sleeves, from The Art of Tea (1976) to One Bad Habit (1980).

The CDs are reissues of the originals, without remasters or bonus tracks.

== Track listing ==
All tracks are written by Michael Franks, unless otherwise noted

Disc one: The Art of Tea (1976)
| No. | Title | Length |
|---|---|---|
| 1. | "Nightmoves" | 4:03 |
| 2. | "Eggplant" | 3:34 |
| 3. | "Monkey See—Monkey Do" | 3:33 |
| 4. | "St. Elmo's Fire" | 3:58 |
| 5. | "I Don't Know Why I'm So Happy I'm Sad" | 4:16 |
| 6. | "Jive" | 3:16 |
| 7. | "Popsicle Toes" | 4:35 |
| 8. | "Sometimes I Just Forget to Smile" | 3:45 |
| 9. | "Mr. Blue" | 4:03 |
| Total length: | | 35:03 |

Disc two: Sleeping Gypsy (1978)
| No. | Title | Writer(s) | Length |
|---|---|---|---|
| 1. | "The Lady Wants to Know" | | 4:45 |
| 2. | "I Really Hope It's You" | | 4:54 |
| 3. | "In the Eye of the Storm" | | 5:55 |
| 4. | "B'wana-He No Home" | | 4:57 |
| 5. | "Don't Be Blue" | Michael Franks, John Guerin | 3:28 |
| 6. | "Antonio's Song (The Rainbow)" | | 5:03 |
| 7. | "Chain Reaction" | Michael Franks, Joe Sample | 5:14 |
| 8. | "Down in Brazil" | | 4:33 |
| Total length: | | | 38:49 |

Disc three: Burchfield Nines (1978)
| No. | Title | Length |
|---|---|---|
| 1. | "When the Cookie Jar Is Empty" | 5:11 |
| 2. | "A Robin Song" | 3:49 |
| 3. | "Wrestle a Live Nude Girl" | 4:35 |
| 4. | "Burchfield Nines" | 4:40 |
| 5. | "Meet Me in the Deerpark" | 6:02 |
| 6. | "Dear Little Nightingale" | 5:02 |
| 7. | "In Search of the Perfect Shampoo" | 4:06 |
| 8. | "Vivaldi's Song" | 4:12 |
| Total length: | | 37:21 |

Disc four: Tiger in the Rain (1979)
| No. | Title | Length |
|---|---|---|
| 1. | "Sanpaku" | 4:10 |
| 2. | "When It's Over" | 3:03 |
| 3. | "Living on the Inside" | 5:36 |
| 4. | "Hideaway" | 4:09 |
| 5. | "Jardin Botanico" | 3:32 |
| 6. | "Underneath the Apple Tree" | 5:52 |
| 7. | "Tiger in the Rain" | 4:17 |
| 8. | "Satisfaction Guaranteed" | 3:39 |
| 9. | "Lifeline" | 6:10 |
| Total length: | | 40:48 |

Disc five: One Bad Habit (1980)
| No. | Title | Writer(s) | Length |
|---|---|---|---|
| 1. | "Baseball" | | 3:50 |
| 2. | "Inside You" | | 4:11 |
| 3. | "All Dressed Up with Nowhere to Go" | | 3:47 |
| 4. | "Lotus Blossom" | Michael Franks, Don Grolnick | 4:15 |
| 5. | "On My Way Home to You" | | 4:52 |
| 6. | "One Bad Habit" | | 4:06 |
| 7. | "Loving You More and More" | | 3:44 |
| 8. | "Still Life" | | 4:12 |
| 9. | "He Tells Himself He's Happy" | | 4:15 |
| Total length: | | | 38:08 |

== Reception ==
Professional ratings
Review scores
| Source | Rating |
|---|---|
| AllMusic | 4.0/5 stars |

Andy Kellman of AllMusic commented "[t]hese albums are among Franks' best work; the fourth and fifth albums don't rate with the first three, but they do have their moments."
