= Indispensable (Michael Franks album) =

Compilation album by Michael Franks
- Released: June 30, 1988
- Recorded: 1976 – 1987
- Genre: Jazz; vocal jazz; smooth jazz
- Length: 1:08:58
- Label: Warner Bros.

Michael Franks chronology
The Camera Never Lies (1987)	Indispensable (1988)	Blue Pacific (1990)

Indispensable is a jazz vocal album by Michael Franks released only in markets outside of the U.S.A. in 1988 by Warner Bros. Records. It is Franks' twelfth album, and his first of four compilation releases with the label.

The compilation contains a selection of tracks spanning eleven years, from The Art of Tea in 1976, to The Camera Never Lies in 1987.

Franks has since released eight more studio albums, rendering this compilation a fairly representative sample of his earlier work; of note his collaborations with the Tommy LiPuma and Al Schmitt production team, and later with Rob Mounsey.

== Track listing ==
All tracks are written by Michael Franks, unless otherwise stated.

No.	Title	Writer(s)	Length
1.	"Eggplant" (from The Art of Tea, 1976)		3:38
2.	"Monkey See—Monkey Do" (from The Art of Tea, 1976)		3:35
3.	"The Lady Wants To Know" (from Sleeping Gypsy, 1977)		4:45
4.	"Down In Brazil" (from Sleeping Gypsy, 1977)		4:35
5.	"Don't Be Blue" (from Sleeping Gypsy, 1977)	Michael Franks, John Guerin	3:30
6.	"When The Cookie Jar Is Empty" (from Burchfield Nines, 1978)		5:12
7.	"A Robin Song" (from Burchfield Nines, 1978)		3:48
8.	"Jardin Botanico" (from Tiger in the Rain, 1979)		3:33
9.	"When It's Over" (from Tiger in the Rain, 1979)		3:11
10.	"Baseball" (from One Bad Habit, 1980)		3:50
11.	"Jealousy" (from Objects of Desire, 1982)		3:39
12.	"No Deposit Love" (from Objects of Desire, 1982)		5:12
13.	"Rainy Night In Tokyo" (from Passionfruit, 1983)		4:43
14.	"Never Satisfied" (from Passionfruit, 1983)		3:56
15.	"Read My Lips" (from Skin Dive, 1985)		3:41
16.	"Face To Face" (from The Camera Never Lies, 1987)		4:27
17.	"The Camera Never Lies" (from The Camera Never Lies, 1987)		3:42
