= Michael Franks with Crossfire Live =

Live album by Michael Franks
- Released: 1980 on vinyl; 2003 on CD
- Recorded: September 25–29, 1980
- Genre: Jazz
- Length: 42:03
- Label: Warner Music Australia
- Producer: Michael Franks

Michael Franks chronology
| One Bad Habit (1980) | Michael Franks with Crossfire Live (00000001) | Objects of Desire (1982) |

Michael Franks with Crossfire Live is a live jazz vocal album by Michael Franks featuring the Australian band Crossfire. It was recorded over a series of three concerts in Australia and New Zealand in September 1980; at the Capitol Theater in Sydney on the 25th, St James Tavern in Sydney on the 27th and The Town Hall in Auckland on the 29th.

The album was officially released in Australia and New Zealand in 1980 with Warner Music Australia, now Warner Music Australasia. It was re-released on CD in 2003 but is now out of production as a single album.

In 2012, a replica version of the album was included in the box set The Dream 1973-2011.

== Track listing ==
All tracks are written by Michael Franks. "Don't Be Blue" co-written by John Guerin. "Chain Reaction" co-written by Joe Sample.

Side one
| No. | Title | Length |
|---|---|---|
| 1. | "Don't Be Blue" (from Sleeping Gypsy, 1977) | 3:48 |
| 2. | "When The Cookie Jar is Empty" (from Burchfield Nines, 1978) | 6:34 |
| 3. | "The Lady Wants to Know" (from Sleeping Gypsy, 1977) | 6:06 |
| 4. | "B'wana He No Home" (from Sleeping Gypsy, 1977) | 4:55 |

Side two
| No. | Title | Length |
|---|---|---|
| 1. | "Chain Reaction" (from Sleeping Gypsy, 1977) | 4:29 |
| 2. | "Antonio's Song" (from Sleeping Gypsy, 1977) | 4:43 |
| 3. | "Monkey See—Monkey Do" (from The Art of Tea, 1976) | 6:22 |
| 4. | "Popsicle Toes" (from The Art of Tea, 1976) | 5:06 |

== Charts ==
| Chart (1981) | Peak position |
|---|---|
| Australian (Kent Music Report) | 92 |

== Personnel ==
=== Performers with Crossfire ===
- Michael Franks – vocals
- Ian Bloxsom – percussion, mallets
- Jim Kelly – guitar
- Michael J. Kenny – acoustic piano, electric piano
- Phil Scorgie – bass
- Steve Hopes – drums
- Tony Buchanan – saxophone, flute

=== Support ===
- Recording and mixing – Martin Benge
