= Time Together =

Studio album by Michael Franks
- Released: June 14, 2011
- Studios: Off The Wall Studios (West Caldwell, New Jersey); Pomeranian Sound (New York); BiCoastal Music (Ossing, New York); NRS Recording Studio (Catskill, New York)
- Genres: Jazz; vocal jazz; smooth jazz
- Length: 56:51
- Label: Shanachie
- Producers: Charles Blenzig; Gil Goldstein; Chuck Loeb; Scott Petito; Mark Egan

Michael Franks chronology
Michael Franks: Original Album Series (2010)	Time Together (2011)	The Dream 1973-2011 (2012)

Time Together is a jazz vocal album released in 2011 by Michael Franks with Shanachie Records. It is Franks' seventeenth album and marked a departure from his previous recordings by being his first with an independent record label.

== Track listing ==
All tracks are written by Michael Franks.

No.	Title	Length
1.	"Now That the Summer's Here"	5:27
2.	"One Day in St. Tropez"	5:19
3.	"Summer in New York"	5:57
4.	"Mice"	5:26
5.	"Charlie Chan in Egypt"	5:29
6.	"I'd Rather Be Happy Than Right"	4:41
7.	"Time Together"	3:37
8.	"Samba Blue"	4:45
9.	"My Heart Said Wow"	2:47
10.	"If I Could Make September Stay"	5:23
11.	"Feathers from an Angel's Wing"	8:00

== Personnel ==
- Michael Franks – vocals
- Chuck Loeb – keyboards (1, 3, 6, 8), guitars (1, 3, 6, 8, 11), drum and percussion programming (1, 3, 8)
- Gil Goldstein – acoustic piano (2, 7, 10)
- Charles Blenzig – acoustic piano (5, 9), keyboards (5, 9)
- Clifford Carter – keyboards (11)
- Romero Lubambo – guitars (2, 7, 10)
- David Spinozza – guitars (4)
- Will Lee – bass guitar (1), backing vocals (1)
- Greg Cohen – bass guitar (2, 7, 10)
- Mark Egan – bass guitar (3, 8), fretted and fretless basses (11)
- Scott Petito – bass guitar (4)
- Jay Anderson – bass guitar (5, 9)
- Tim Lefebvre – bass guitar (6)
- Wolfgang Haffner – drums (1, 6, 8), percussion (6, 8)
- Shawn Pelton – drums (3), percussion (3)
- Jerry Marotta – drums (4)
- Billy Kilson – drums (5, 9)
- Joe Bonadio – drums (11), percussion (11)
- Rogerio Boccato – percussion (2, 7, 10)
- Mike Mainieri – vibraphone (4)
- Eric Marienthal – alto saxophone (1, 8)
- David Mann – saxophone (5, 9)
- Till Brönner – trumpet (1, 3)
- Alex Sipiagin – trumpet (5, 9)
- Carmen Cuesta – backing vocals (1, 8)
- Lizzy Loeb – backing vocals (3)
- Veronica Nunn – backing vocals (3, 5, 9), vocals (9)
- Beth Nielsen Chapman – backing vocals (4)

=== Production ===
- Scott Petito – executive producer, vocal recording, mastering, assembling recording (2, 4, 5, 7, 9, 10), mixing (2, 4, 5, 7, 9, 10), producer (4), arrangements (4)
- Danny Weiss – A&R
- Chuck Loeb – producer (1, 3, 6, 8), arrangements (1, 3, 6, 8), recording (1, 3, 6, 8)
- Gil Goldstein – producer (2, 7, 10), arrangements (2, 7, 10)
- Charles Blenzig – producer (5, 9), arrangements (5, 9)
- Mark Egan – producer (11), arrangements (11), mixing (11)
- Dennis Wall – mixing (1, 3, 6, 8)
- Hal Winer – recording (11)
- Phil Magnotti – mixing (11)
- Jeremy Knoll – recording assistant (11)
- Beth Reineke – assistant (vocal recording, mixing, mastering, assembling)
- Alysabeth Beesmer – art direction, design
- Kristina Swarner – cover painting
- Michael Franks – back cover photography
- Dion Ogust – additional photography
- John Rosenberg – tour management

== Reception ==
Professional ratings
Review scores
Source	Rating
AllMusic	4/5 stars

Writing for the Urban Music Scene website, A. Scott Galloway ended his review by commenting "[f]ile under highly recommended... and sublime."

Comparing the album to Franks' other recent works such as Rendezvous in Rio, Thom Jurek commented on AllMusic that "[w]hile his framework may be contemporary, his execution is timeless, making Time Together Franks' most consistent, graceful collection of songs in the 21st century."

John Beaudin praised Now That the Summer's Here on SmoothJazzNow.com, claiming it to be "one of his strongest tunes in twenty years" and that "it's not everyday that someone's art shows so much peace and a transparent look at such an interesting perspective of life."
