= Will Lee (bassist) =

American bassist (born 1952)

- Born: September 8, 1952 (age 74)
- Genres: Jazz fusion; jazz rock; jazz; rock
- Occupation: Musician
- Instruments: Bass guitar; vocals
- Years active: 1973–present
- Website: willlee.com

Will Lee (born September 8, 1952) is an American jazz fusion bass guitarist known for his work on the Late Show with David Letterman as part of the CBS Orchestra and Paul Shaffer and the World's Most Dangerous Band during Letterman’s tenure as host of NBC's Late Night with David Letterman.

Lee has recorded and toured with many performers. He appeared on the Mark & Clark Band's hit record Worn Down Piano. He formerly performed a Beatles tribute band, the Fab Faux, which he co-founded in 1998.

== Career ==
=== Beginnings in music ===
Lee was greatly influenced to pursue music because of his parents. His father, William Franklin Lee III, played piano, trumpet, and the upright bass professionally. Lee's mother Lois sang with big bands. Lee took up drums after seeing the Beatles on The Ed Sullivan Show, and by the time he was 12 had formed his first band in Miami. The band members each earned $6 a night playing the popular surfing tunes characteristic of the '60s. With a large numbers of drummers in Miami, Lee shifted to bass, an instrument that offered him more opportunities. Lee was part of a succession of bands, including top 40 bands, with names like "Chances R”, "the Loving Kind", and "Green Cloud".

Lee studied French horn for a year, then switched to bass, which he studied at the University of Miami After classes, he worked on bass fundamentals by listening to not only the Beatles, but also Stevie Wonder, Jimi Hendrix, Steve Miller, the Rascals, Motown, and Sly & the Family Stone among others. He would put it all into practice six sets a night playing with various local bands, including a horn band called "Goldrush.

=== Professional music career ===
Lee then went to New York City. Trumpeter Randy Brecker called Lee out of class one day and invited him to audition for jazz-rock group Dreams. He won the part and played on the album Imagine My Surprise as a bassist and vocalist.

After Dreams disbanded, Lee's career as a session musician flourished, and he toured with many artists. He played in the New York 24th Street Band. His solo CD entitled OH! reached the No. 1 position on the "Jazz Beyond" chart there.

On January 20, 2016, Lee played bass with Christopher Cross at the Moody Theater in Austin, Texas, at a taping for Austin City Limits.

=== The CBS Orchestra ===
In 1982, Lee became one of the original members of The World's Most Dangerous Band', the house band on NBC's Late Night with David Letterman. He holds the distinction of playing with Paul Shaffer, on both Late Night and the Late Show, longer than any other member of the CBS Orchestra. Before the Late Show began taping, he often tossed out guitar picks to the audience as souvenirs. On the May 13, 2015, episode of the Late Show with David Letterman, as Letterman was interviewing Paul Shaffer, Shaffer gave recognition to the members of his band, and lastly mentioned Lee as the "man has been with us on bass since the first night we were on Late Night, Will Lee."

== Awards and honors ==
- NARAS MVP Award for bass guitar, 1979, 1982, 1985–1987
- NARAS MVP Award for male session singer, 1987
- NARAS MVP Virtuoso Award for bass guitar, 1989
- Grammy Award for Best Large Jazz Ensemble Album, Some Skunk Funk, with Michael Brecker, Randy Brecker, Peter Erskine, Jim Beard, Vince Mendoza, Marcio Doctor, and the WDR Big Band, 2006
- Inducted into the Musicians Hall of Fame and Museum in 2014

== Basses ==
Lee uses the Sadowsky Will Lee model, 4 and 5-string Fender Jazz-style basses with a narrower nut width of 1.45" [37mm] instead of the usual 1.5" [38mm], 22 frets and a Hipshot D-tuner. This is the only instrument offered by Sadowsky that has a midrange control, an on-off toggle switch selectable between 500hz and 800hz. The bass was built for him by Roger Sadowsky and has now become a production model within the line of Sadowsky basses.

== Discography ==
- OH! (1993)
- Birdhouse (2006)
- Love, Gratitude and Other Distractions (2013)

=== As sideman ===
With Alessi Brothers

- All For a Reason (A&M, 1977)

With Peter Allen

- I Could Have Been a Sailor (A&M Records, 1979)

With Joan Armatrading

- Me Myself I (A&M Records, 1980)

With Patti Austin

- End of a Rainbow (CTI, 1976)
- Havana Candy (CTI, 1977)
- Body Language (CTI, 1980)
- In My Life (CTI, 1983)

With Aztec Camera

- Love (Sire, 1987)

With Carole Bayer Sager

- Carole Bayer Sager (Elektra Records, 1977)

With Joe Beck

- Beck (Kudu, 1975)

With Bee Gees

- E.S.P. (Warner Bros., 1987)

With George Benson

- Benson & Farrell with Joe Farrell (CTI, 1976)
- Livin' Inside Your Love (Warner Bros. Records, 1979)
- In Your Eyes (Warner Bros. Records, 1983)
- Love Remembers (Warner Bros. Records, 1993)

With Michael Bolton

- The Hunger (Columbia Records, 1987)

With The Brecker Brothers

- The Brecker Bros. (Arista, 1975)
- Back to Back (Arista, 1976)
- Don't Stop the Music (Arista, 1977)
- Return of the Brecker Brothers (GRP, 1992)

With Dan Brenner

- Little Dark Angel (2011)

With Hiram Bullock

- From All Sides (Atlantic, 1986)
- Give It What U Got (Atlantic, 1987)
- Way Kool (Atlantic, 1992)
- World of Collision (Big World, 1994)
- Manny's Car Wash (Big World, 1996)
- First Class Vagabond (JVC Victor, 2000)
- Guitarman (JVC Victor, 2000)
- Color Me (Via, 2001)
- Best of Hiram Bullock (WEA, 2002)
- Try Livin' It (EFA, 2003)
- Too Funky 2 Ignore (BHM, 2006)

With Gary Burton

- Reunion (GRP, 1990)
- Cool Nights (GRP, 1991)
- Six Pack (GRP, 1992)

With Peabo Bryson

- Take No Prisoners (Elektra Records, 1985)

With Irene Cara

- Anyone Can See (Elektra Records, 1982)
- What a Feelin' (Epic Records, 1983)

With Mariah Carey

- Emotions (Columbia, 1991)

With Felix Cavaliere

- Destiny (Bearsville, 1975)
- Castles in the Air (Epic, 1979)

With Beth Nielsen Chapman

- You Hold the Key (Reprise Records, 1993)

With Cher

- Take Me Home (Casablanca Records, 1979)
- Cher (Geffen Records, 1987)

With Clarence Clemons

- A Night With Mr. C (CBS Records, 1989)

With Jimmy Cliff

- Give Thankx (Warner Bros. Records, 1978)

With Linda Clifford

- I'll Keep on Loving You (Capitol Records, 1982)

With Natalie Cole

- Snowfall on the Sahara (Elektra Records, 1999)

With Judy Collins

- Fires of Eden (Columbia, 1990)

With Lou Courtney

- Buffalo Smoke (RCA Victor, 1976)

With Randy Crawford

- Raw Slik (Warner Bros. Records, 1979)

With Peter Criss

- One for All (Megaforce, 2007)

With Christopher Cross

- Secret Ladder (Christopher Cross Records, 2014)
- Take Me As I Am (Christopher Cross Records, 2017)

With Ron Dante

- Street Angel (Handshake Records, 1981)

With D'Angelo

- Brown Sugar (EMI, 1995)

With Cornell Dupree

- Shadow Dancing (Versatile, 1978)

With Sheena Easton

- What Comes Naturally (MCA Records, 1991)

With Enchantment

- Once Upon a Dream (United Artists, 1978)

With Donald Fagen

- The Nightfly (Warner Bros. 1982)

With Art Farmer

- Crawl Space (CTI, 1977)
- Yama with Joe Henderson (CTI, 1979)

With Roberta Flack

- Blue Lights in the Basement (Atlantic Records, 1977)

With Michael Franks

- Burchfield Nines (Warner Bros. Records, 1978)
- Objects of Desire (Warner Bros. Records, 1982)
- Passionfruit (Warner Bros. Records, 1983)
- Skin Dive (Warner Bros. Records, 1985)
- The Camera Never Lies (Warner Bros. Records, 1987)
- Barefoot on the Beach (Windham Hill Records, 1999)
- Time Together (Shanachie Records, 2011)

With Roberta Flack and Donny Hathaway

- Roberta Flack Featuring Donny Hathaway (Arista Records, 1980)

With Ace Frehley

- Ace Frehley (Casablanca, 1978)

With Steve Goodman

- Say It in Private (Asylum Records, 1977)

With Lawrence Gowan

- Great Dirty World (Columbia Records, 1987)

With Al Green

- Don't Look Back (BMG, 1993)
- Your Heart's in Good Hands (MCA, 1995)

With Henry Gross

- Show Me to the Stage (Lifesong, 1977)
- Love Is the Stuff (Lifesong, 1978)

With Arlo Guthrie

- Hobo's Lullaby (Reprise Records, 1972)

With Spyro Gyra

- Morning Dance (1979)
- Catching the Sun (1980)
- Carnaval (1980)
- Free Time (1981)
- Incognito (1982)

With Major Harris

- How Do You Take Your Love (RCA Records, 1978)

With Cissy Houston

- Cissy Houston (Private Stock Records, 1977)
- Step Aside for a Lady (Columbia Records, 1980)
- Face to Face (BMG, 1996)

With Phyllis Hyman

- Phyllis Hyman (Buddah, 1977)
- Somewhere in My Lifetime (Arista, 1978)

With Janis Ian

- Janis Ian (Columbia Records, 1978)

With Chaka Khan

- Chaka (Atlantic, 1978)
- Chaka Khan (Warner Bros., 1982)

With Kool & the Gang

- In the Heart (De-Lite, 1983)

With Yusef Lateef

- In a Temple Garden (CTI, 1979)

With Lori Lieberman

- Letting Go (Millennium Records, 1978)

With Fred Lipsius

- Better Believe It (Mja Records, 1996)

With Steve Lukather

- Lukather (Columbia Records, 1989)

With Taj Mahal

- Evolution (The Most Recent) (Warner Bros., 1978)

With Melissa Manchester

- Singin'... (Arista Records, 1977)
- Emergency (Arista Records, 1983)
- If My Heart Had Wings (Atlantic Records, 1995)

With Barry Manilow

- Barry Manilow II (Arista Records, 1974)
- This One's For You (Arista Records, 1976)
- Even Now (Arista Records, 1978)
- One Voice (Arista Records, 1979)
- Barry (Arista Records, 1980)
- If I Should Love Again (Arista Records, 1981)
- Manilow (RCA Records, 1985)
- This Is My Town: Songs of New York (Decca, 2017)

With Herbie Mann

- Waterbed (Atlantic, 1975)

With Delbert McClinton

- Never Been Rocked Enough (Curb, 1992)

With Meco

- Star Wars and Other Galactic Funk (Millennium Records, 1977)

With Glenn Medeiros

- It's Alright to Love (Mercury Records, 1993)

With Melanie

- Phonogenic – Not Just Another Pretty Face (Midsong International, 1978)

With Bette Midler

- Bette Midler (Atlantic Records, 1973)
- Thighs and Whispers (Atlantic Records, 1979)

With Liza Minnelli

- Gently (Angel Records, 1996)

With Tim Moore

- Behind the Eyes (Asylum, 1975)

With Kenny Nolan

- A Song Between Us (Polydor, 1978)

With Laura Nyro

- Smile (Columbia Records, 1976)
- Nested (Columbia Records, 1978)

With Odyssey

- Odyssey (RCA Victor, 1977)

With Leslie Pearl

- Words & Music (RCA, 1982)

With Esther Phillips

- You've Come a Long Way, Baby (Mercury, 1977)

With Nicole Renée

- Nicole Renée (Atlantic Records, 1998)

With Vicki Sue Robinson

- Half & Half (RCA Victor, 1978)
- Movin' On (RCA Victor, 1979)

With Diana Ross

- I Love You (Parlophone Records, 2006)

With David Sanborn

- Taking Off (Warner Bros. Records, 1975)

With Leo Sayer

- World Radio (Chrysalis Records, 1982)
- Have You Ever Been in Love (Chrysalis Records, 1983)

With Lalo Schifrin

- Towering Toccata (CTI, 1976)

With Helen Schneider

- So Close (Windsong, 1976)

With Diane Schuur

- Talkin' 'Bout You (GPR, 1988)

With Scritti Politti

- Cupid & Psyche 85 (Virgin/Warner Bros. Records, 1985)

With Don Sebesky

- The Rape of El Morro (CTI, 1975)

With Neil Sedaka

- A Song (Elektra Records, 1977)

With Janis Siegel

- At Home (Atlantic Records, 1987)

With Nina Simone

- Baltimore (CTI, 1978)

With Carly Simon

- Boys in the Trees (Elektra Records, 1978)
- Spy (Elektra Records, 1979)
- Come Upstairs (Warner Bros. Records, 1980)
- Torch (Warner Bros. Records, 1981)
- My Romance (Arista Records, 1990)
- Have You Seen Me Lately (Arista Records, 1990)

With Phoebe Snow

- Second Childhood (Columbia Records, 1976)
- Never Letting Go (Columbia Records, 1977)
- Against the Grain (Columbia Records, 1978)

With Bert Sommer

- Bert Sommer (Capitol, 1977)

With The Spinners

- Labor of Love (Atlantic, 1981)

With Dusty Springfield

- Living Without Your Love (Mercury Records, 1979)

With Ringo Starr

- Ringo's Rotogravure (Polydor Records, 1976)

With Steely Dan

- Two Against Nature (Giant, 2000)

With Mike Stern

- Is What It Is (Atlantic, 1994)
- These Times (ESC, 2004)
- All Over the Place (Heads Up, 2012)

With Cat Stevens

- Back to Earth (Island Records, 1978)

With Barbra Streisand

- Songbird (Columbia Records, 1978)
- Wet (Columbia Records, 1979)

With Libby Titus

- Libby Titus (Columbia, 1977)

With The Manhattan Transfer

- Tonin' (Atlantic Records, 1995)

With Bonnie Tyler

- Faster Than the Speed of Night (Columbia Records, 1983)

With Frankie Valli

- Romantic the 60's (Universal Motown, 2007)

With Narada Michael Walden

- Garden of Love Light (Arista, 1976)

With Dionne Warwick

- Dionne (Arista Records, 1979)
- Friends Can Be Lovers (Arista Records, 1993)

With Vanessa Williams

- Star Bright (Mercury, 1996)
- Next (Mercury, 1997)
- Silver & Gold (Universal, 2004)
- Everlasting Love (Lava, 2005)

With Peter Wolf

- Lights Out (EMI, 1984)
- Fool's Parade (Mercury, 1998)

With Tatsuro Yamashita

- Circus Town (RCA, 1976)
