= The Music in My Head =

Studio album by Michael Franks
- Released: June 8, 2018
- Studio: NRS Recording Studio (Catskill, New York); Dymond Studio (Burbank, California); RB Productions (Pacific Grove, California)
- Genre: Jazz; vocal jazz; smooth jazz
- Length: 50:11
- Label: Shanachie
- Producer: Gil Goldstein; Chuck Loeb; Scott Petito; Charles Blenzig; Jimmy Haslip

Michael Franks chronology
The Dream 1973-2011 (2012)	The Music in My Head (2018)

The Music in My Head is a smooth jazz album released by Michael Franks in 2018. It's his eighteenth studio album, and the second with the independent Shanachie Records.

== Background ==
The Music in My Head is Franks’ first album after a seven-year hiatus. Franks explained to Parade magazine the album was "written about my own personal spiritual journey" and "[it's] about love, our connection to nature, and the beauty and mystery of it all.”

The album features one of the last recorded guitar solos by Chuck Loeb before his death.

== Track listing ==
All tracks are written by Michael Franks.

No.	Title	Length
1.	"As Long As We're Both Together"	6:04
2.	"Suddenly Sci-Fi"	4:35
3.	"The Idea of a Tree"	5:05
4.	"Bluebird Blue"	4:23
5.	"To Spend the Day With You"	6:13
6.	"Bebop Headshop"	4:21
7.	"Where You Hid the Truth"	5:52
8.	"The Music In My Head"	4:57
9.	"Candleglow"	5:43
10.	"Waterfall"	5:28

== Reception ==
Writing for Smooth-Jazz.de, Hans-Bernd Hülsmann praised the album for "offer[ing] great musical and literary preciousness with charm and elegance. The album contains a marked variety of audible values that demand attention and time from the listener to experience and enjoy all facets."

Justin Kantor highly recommended the album for SoulTracks, saying the album "displays as aptly as ever his ability to convey a breadth of topics in a seamless manner that feels like a choice road trip set to the most mellow—yet colorful—of soundscapes."

On the song "Waterfall", Laura B. Whitmore wrote for Parade that "[it's] a whispery tale of the journey from raindrop to waterfall. With a lilting rhythm, clever lyrics and some melodic guitar and vibes, “Waterfall” is like a sonic sigh of satisfaction."

== Personnel ==
- Michael Franks – vocals
- Chuck Loeb – keyboards (1), guitars (1)
- Gil Goldstein – acoustic piano (2, 4, 10)
- Rachel Z – acoustic piano (3, 5, 8), keyboards (3, 5, 8)
- Charles Blenzig – acoustic piano (6)
- Otmaro Ruíz – Fender Rhodes (7, 9), Wurlitzer electric piano (7, 9), synthesizers (7, 9)
- Romero Lubambo – acoustic rhythm guitar (2, 10)
- David Spinozza – electric guitar solo (2, 10), guitars (3–5, 8)
- Larry Koonse – acoustic guitar (7, 9), electric guitar (7, 9)
- Jimmy Haslip – bass (1), additional synthesizers (7, 9), electric bass (7, 9)
- Jay Anderson – acoustic bass (2, 10), bass (4)
- Scott Petito – bass (3, 5, 8)
- Sean Conly – acoustic bass (6)
- Ben Perowsky – drums (3, 5, 8)
- Billy Kilson – drums (6)
- Jimmy Branley – drums (7, 9), percussion (7, 9)
- Manuel Quintana – percussion (1, 3, 5, 8)
- Rogerio Boccato – percussion (2, 4)
- Eric Marienthal – saxophone (1)
- Bob Mintzer – saxophone (3, 5, 8)
- Karel Ruzicka – saxophone (6)
- Gary Meek – soprano saxophone (7, 9), tenor saxophone (7, 9)
- Veronica Nunn – backing vocals (1, 5–7)
- Leslie Ritter – backing vocals (1, 5)

=== Production ===
- Scott Petito – executive producer, vocal recording, mixing, mastering, assembling additional recording (1), recording (2–6, 8, 10) producer (3, 5, 8), arrangements (3, 5, 8)
- Beth Reineke – assistant executive producer
- Chuck Loeb – producer (1), arrangements (1), recording (1)
- Gil Goldstein – producer (2, 4, 10), arrangements (2, 4, 10)
- Charles Blenzig – producer (6), arrangements (6)
- Jimmy Haslip – producer (7, 9), arrangements (7, 9)
- Jimmy Branley – recording (7, 9)
- Richard Bryant – additional recording (7, 9)
- Megan Denver – art direction, design
- Claudia Franks – cover concept, photography
- Michael Franks – cover concept, photography
- John Rosenberg – tour management
