= Popsicle Toes =

1976 single by Michael Franks

Single by Michael Franks

from the album The Art of Tea
- B-side: "I Don't Know Why I'm So Happy I'm Sad"
- Released: 1976
- Genre: Pop
- Length: 3:30
- Label: Reprise Records
- Songwriter: Michael Franks
- Producer: Tommy LiPuma

Michael Franks singles chronology
"The King of Oklahoma" (1973)	"Popsicle Toes" (1976)	"The Lady Wants to Know" (1977)

"Popsicle Toes" is a song by Michael Franks. It was released in 1976 as a single from his album The Art of Tea.

The song is Franks' only Billboard Hot 100 entry, peaking at No. 43.

The Manhattan Transfer covered the song on their 1976 album Coming Out. Diana Krall sang a cover version of the song on her 1999 studio album When I Look In Your Eyes.

== Chart performance ==
Chart (1976)	Peak position
US Billboard Hot 100	43
US Billboard Easy Listening	45
