= Indispensable =

Indispensable may refer to:

- Indispensable (1791 ship)
- Indispensable (Lucero album), 2010
- Indispensable (Michael Franks album)
- "Indispensable", single by Chayanne from album Mi Tiempo
