= Barefoot on the Beach =

Studio album by Michael Franks
- Released: June 1, 1999
- Studio: Clinton Recording Studios (New York City, New York); Make Believe Ballroom (West Shokan, New York); Automotive Recording Studios (Irvington, New York); Remidi Studio (Dobbs Ferry, New York); Bearsville Studios (Bearsville, New York)
- Genre: Smooth jazz; vocal jazz
- Length: 1:02:27
- Label: Windham Hill
- Producer: Chuck Loeb; Jimmy Haslip

Michael Franks chronology
The Best of Michael Franks: A Backward Glance (1998)	Barefoot on the Beach (1999)	The Michael Franks Anthology: The Art of Love (2003)

Barefoot on the Beach is a smooth jazz album by American singer-songwriter Michael Franks, released in 1999 by Windham Hill Records.

== Background ==
Franks' relationship with Warner Bros. Records (and its subsidiary Reprise Records) which began with the 1976 album The Art of Tea ended with Barefoot on the Beach. The album was his first and only release by Windham Hill, a Sony Music label; subsequent albums would be released by Koch (E1 Music) and Shanachie Records. His compilation albums continued to be released by Warner Bros. The album includes Valerie Simpson, who sings a duet in "Now Love Has No End", Joe Sample, and Jimmy Haslip of The Yellowjackets.

Although the album evokes summer, it also contains biting commentary on Broadcast Architecture's dominance of American smooth jazz radio at the time with "Mr. Smooth". Lyrics such as "some of us remember how much choice there was, before he took the throne" and "his verdict we must wait" lament the dominance and perceived heavy-handed influence of the network on the genre.

== Track listing ==
All tracks are written by Michael Franks, except where noted.

No.	Title	Writer(s)	Length
1.	"Barefoot on the Beach"	Franks, Charles Blenzig	5:04
2.	"Heart Like an Open Book"		4:48
3.	"Now Love Has No End" (with Valerie Simpson)		6:13
4.	"The Fountain of Youth"		5:52
5.	"When You Smiled at Me"		5:04
6.	"Double Talk"		6:12
7.	"Every Time She Whispers"		7:24
8.	"Why Spring Ain't Here"		4:27
9.	"A Walk in the Rain"		6:21
10.	"Mr. Smooth"		4:40
11.	"Like Moon Behind a Cloud"		6:23

== Personnel ==
- Michael Franks – vocals
- Charles Blenzig – keyboards (1), drum and percussion programming (1), arrangements (1)
- Chris Palmaro – keyboards (2, 8, 10, 11)
- Jimmy Haslip – additional keyboards (2, 10, 11), bass (2, 4, 7, 8, 10, 11), percussion (8)
- Mike Ricchiuti – keyboards (3–7, 9), rhythm arrangements (3, 5–7, 9)
- Bob James – acoustic piano (6)
- Jim Beard – strings (9), string arrangements (9)
- Jay Azzolina – guitars (1)
- Jeff Mironov – guitars (2, 10, 11)
- Chuck Loeb – arrangements (1), guitars (3, 5–7, 9), rhythm arrangements (3, 5–7, 9), horn arrangements (3)
- Steve Khan – guitars (4, 8)
- Will Lee – bass (1, 3, 5), backing vocals (5)
- John Patitucci – acoustic bass (6, 9)
- Shawn Pelton – drums (2, 10, 11)
- Brian Dunne – drums (3), drum programming (3)
- Wolfgang Haffner – cymbal rolls (3), drums (5, 9), finger snaps (6)
- Steve Gadd – drums (4, 6–8), finger snaps (6)
- David Charles – percussion (1, 5–7), finger snaps (6)
- Bashiri Johnson – percussion (2, 10, 11)
- Dave Samuels – vibraphone (4, 6, 9)
- Chris Hunter – alto saxophone (1), flute (1)
- Bob Mintzer – saxophone (2, 4, 8), horn arrangements (4, 8)
- Andy Snitzer – alto saxophone (3, 7), alto sax solo (3), horn arrangements (3, 7)
- David Mann – flute (3, 7)
- Michael Brecker – tenor saxophone (5)
- Birch Johnson – trombone (3, 8)
- Jimmy Hynes – flugelhorn (3, 7)
- Larry Lunetta – trumpet (4, 8)
- Randy Brecker – trumpet (9)
- Carmen Cuesta – backing vocals (1, 5, 7)
- Valerie Simpson – vocals (3)
- Lani Groves – backing vocals (5)
- Tawatha Agee – backing vocals (10)

=== Production ===
- Patrick Clifford – A&R
- Chuck Loeb – producer (1, 3, 5, 6, 9)
- Jimmy Haslip – producer (2, 4, 7, 8, 10, 11)
- Phil Magnotti – track recording, mixing, additional recording
- Dennis Wall – track recording, additional recording
- Tom Mark – vocal recording
- Ken Freeman – piano recording (6)
- Steve Regina – additional recording
- Keith Shortreed – recording assistant
- Jeff Sochor – mix assistant
- Andrea Franklin – A&R administration
- Sonny Mediana – art direction, photography
- Sanae Robinson – design
- Claudia Franks – photo of Michael Franks
- Megan Denver – photo enhancement

== Reception ==
Professional ratings
Review scores
Source	Rating
AllMusic	3/5 stars

Writing for AllMusic, Jonathan Widran praised Franks' vocal style and longevity. "Countless musical trends have steamrolled by since this wry singer songwriter with the cool and collected, wistful onionskin voice first graced the adult music world in the mid-'70s [..] yet Franks has stood his ground, growing as an observational lyricist while his relaxed demeanor stays pretty much the same, and charmingly so." He concluded the album is "the kind of spring in your step music Franks fashioned his career out of."
