= Coming Out (album) =

Studio album by The Manhattan Transfer
- Released: August 19, 1976
- Recorded: 1975
- Genre: Pop
- Length: 37'47"
- Label: Atlantic
- Producer: Richard Perry

The Manhattan Transfer chronology
The Manhattan Transfer (1975)	Coming Out (1976)	Pastiche (1978)

Professional ratings
Review scores
Source	Rating
Allmusic	2/5 stars
Christgau's Record Guide	B

Coming Out is the third album by The Manhattan Transfer, released August 19, 1976, on Atlantic Records.

The single "Chanson d'Amour" hit the No. 1 spot in the United Kingdom for three weeks.

The song "Zindy Lou" featured Ringo Starr and Jim Keltner on drums, Dr. John on piano, and Doug Thorngren on percussion. The song "Poinciana (The Song of the Tree)" featured a solo by Michael Brecker.

== Track listing ==
=== LP side 1 ===
1. "Don't Let Go" (Jesse Stone) - 2:45
2. "Zindy Lou" (Johnny Moore, Eddie Smith) – 2:50
3. "Chanson D'Amour" (Wayne Shanklin) – 2:55
4. "Helpless" (Holland-Dozier-Holland) – 3:07
5. "Scotch and Soda" (Dave Guard) – 2:59
6. "The Speak Up Mambo (Cuentame)" (Al Castellanos) – 3:05

=== LP side 2 ===
1. "Poinciana (The Song of the Tree)" (Nat Simon, Buddy Bernier) – 4:11
2. "S.O.S." (Ron Roker, Gerry Shury, Phil Swern) - 3:10
3. "Popsicle Toes" (Michael Franks) – 4:16
4. "It Wouldn't Have Made Any Difference" (Todd Rundgren) – 3:30
5. "The Thought of Loving You" (David White) – 2:56

The album was re-released on CD in March 1993.

== Personnel ==
The Manhattan Transfer

- Tim Hauser – vocals, vocal arrangements (1–4, 6, 8, 11), song concept (7)
- Laurel Massé – vocals, vocal arrangements (1, 4, 10)
- Alan Paul – vocals, vocal arrangements (1, 11), song concept (7)
- Janis Siegel – vocals, vocal arrangements (1–8, 10-11)

Musicians

- Paul Griffin – organ (1)
- Dr. John – acoustic piano (2)
- John Barnes – acoustic piano (3)
- Steve Paietta – accordion (3)
- Clarence McDonald – acoustic piano (4, 8)
- Bill Payne – electric piano (5, 7, 10)
- Roger Steinman – acoustic piano (5)
- Arthur Jenkins – acoustic piano (6), arrangements (6)
- Dave Frishberg – acoustic piano (9), clavinet (9)
- Mike Melvoin – acoustic piano (11)
- Ira Newborn – guitar, orchestral arrangements, musical director, vocal arrangements (5, 9), electric autoharp (10)
- Ben Benay – guitar (3)
- Bob Bowles – rhythm guitar (9, 10)
- Andy Muson – bass guitar (all tracks)
- Roy Markowitz – drums (1, 6)
- Jim Keltner – drums (2, 8)
- Ringo Starr – drums (2, 8)
- Jim Gordon – drums (3, 9)
- Rick Shlosser – drums (4, 11)
- Jim Nelson – drums (5)
- David Kemper – drums (10)
- Bobbye Hall – percussion (1), congas (10)
- Doug Thorngren – percussion (2)
- Ralph MacDonald – percussion (4, 11), congas (6)
- Nicky Marrero – timbales (6)
- Johnny "Dandy" Rodriguez Jr – bongos (6), cowbell (6)
- Michael Brecker – tenor saxophone (1)
- Jay Migliori – tenor sax solo (3)
- Jackie Kelso – baritone sax solo (4), tenor sax solo (8)
- Randy Brecker – trumpet (1)

=== Production ===
- Richard Perry – producer
- Tim Hauser – assistant producer
- Douglas Botnick – engineer
- Lewis Hahn – engineer
- Rick Rowe – engineer
- Howard Steele – engineer, remixing
- Dennis Devlin – assistant engineer
- Dan Latham – assistant engineer
- Tim Sadler – assistant engineer
- Allen Zentz – mastering
- Bob Defrin – art direction, design
- Abie Sussman – art direction, design
- Suze Randall – cover photography

== Certifications ==
Certifications for Coming Out
Region	Certification	Certified units/sales
Australia (ARIA)	Gold	20,000^{^}
^{^} Shipments figures based on certification alone.
