= Worn Down Piano =

Single by Mark & Clark Band

Single by Mark & Clark Band

from the album Double Take
- Released: 1977
- Genre: pop
- Length: 3:54
- Label: CBS
- Songwriters: Mark Seymour, Anthony Masimo
- Producer: Ron Dante

"Worn Down Piano" is a song by the American group The Mark & Clark Band, from their album Double Take. The song was written in 1977 by twin brothers Clark and Mark Seymour. The record was produced by Ron Dante of Archies fame, and was released as a single.

The song (duration 8:10) is about a piano that is being bid for at an auction. It starts in 6/8 time and changes to 4/4 time at the beginning of the piano solo.

The song reached sixth place in the Dutch Top 40. Since the first edition in 1999, "Worn Down Piano" has consistently been in the Top 2000, a popular Dutch year-end list, peaking at number 59 in the 2002 edition and at number 387 in the most recent edition of 2024.

Clark has passed away in 2012.

== Credits ==
These musicians appear on the recording:

- Clark Seymour, piano, vocals
- Mark Seymour, piano, vocals
- Allan Schwartzberg, drums
- Errol "Crusher" Bennett, percussion
- Elliott Randall, guitar
- Frank Owens, keyboards
- Hugh McCracken, guitar
- Jimmy Maelen, percussion
- Jimmy Young, drums
- John Tropea, guitar
- Kenneth Bichel, synthesizer
- Paul Shaffer, keyboards
- Will Lee, bass
