= I'm Easy (album) =

Studio album by Keith Carradine
- Released: 1976
- Studio: Devonshire, Los Angeles, California; Elektra, Los Angeles, California
- Label: Asylum; 7E-1066
- Producer: John Guerin

Keith Carradine chronology
I'm Easy (1976)	Lost & Found (1978)

I'm Easy is a 1976 album by Keith Carradine recorded at Devonshire Sound Studios, North Hollywood, and Elektra Sound Recorders, Los Angeles. The album, named after the hit single "I'm Easy", reached number 61 on the US Billboard 200.

== Track listing ==
All tracks composed by Keith Carradine

1. "Honey Won't You Let Me Be Your Friend"
2. "High Sierra"
3. "Been Gone So Long"
4. "I'm Easy"
5. "The Soul is Strong"
6. "I Will Never Forget Your Face"
7. "It's Been So Long"
8. "Raining in the City"
9. "I'll Be There"
10. "Spellbound"

== Personnel ==
- Keith Carradine - vocals, guitar, backing vocals
- Ben Benay, Dean Parks, Larry Carlton, Lee Ritenour - guitar
- Max Bennett, Reinie Press - bass guitar
- Dave Grusin - Fender Rhodes, synthesizer, arrangements; ARP synthesizer on "I'm Easy"
- Earl Palmer, Harvey Mason, Jim Gordon - drums
- John Guerin - drums; piano on "I'm Easy"
- David Luell - saxophone
- Al Aarons - trumpet
- Mike Barone - trombone
- Carol Carmichael, Ted Neeley - backing vocals
- John Mayall - piano and harmonica on "Been Gone So Long"
- Frank Rosolino - trombone on "The Soul is Strong"
- Dennis Budimir - guitar on "I Will Never Forget Your Face"

Technical

- Fritz Richmond, Jerry Hudgins - engineer
- Henry Lewy, John Guerin, Jerry Hudgins - mixing
- Glen Christensen - art direction
- George Hurrell - photography
