= Watching the Snow =

2003 studio album by Michael Franks

Studio album by Michael Franks
- Released: 2003 in Japan; 2004 in the U.S.
- Studio: NRS Recording Studio (Catskill, New York)
- Genre: Smooth jazz; Christmas
- Length: 49:03
- Label: Columbia; Sleeping Gypsy; Koch
- Producer: Charles Blenzig; Michael Franks

Michael Franks chronology
| The Michael Franks Anthology: The Art of Love (2003) | Watching the Snow (00000004) | Love Songs (2004) |

Watching the Snow is a jazz album by the American singer Michael Franks. It was released in Japan by Columbia Records in 2003, in the U.S. by Sleeping Gypsy in 2004, and again in the U.S. by Koch Records.

Watching the Snow was Franks' first Christmas album. Rather than covering other holiday music standards, he wrote all the songs. According to the liner notes, sales from the album were donated to Hearts United for Animals.

== Track listing ==
All tracks are written by Michael Franks.

| No. | Title | Length |
|---|---|---|
| 1. | "The Way We Celebrate New Year's" | 6:23 |
| 2. | "Watching the Snow" | 5:41 |
| 3. | "Christmas in Kyoto" | 4:50 |
| 4. | "My Present" | 4:30 |
| 5. | "I Bought You a Plastic Star (For Your Aluminum Tree)" | 3:36 |
| 6. | "Said the Snowflake" | 4:51 |
| 7. | "The Kiss" | 4:41 |
| 8. | "When the Snowman Sings" | 4:21 |
| 9. | "Island Christmas" | 5:44 |
| 10. | "My Present (Reprise)" | 4:28 |

== Reception ==
Professional ratings
Review scores
| Source | Rating |
|---|---|
| AllMusic | 3.5/5 stars |

Writing for AllMusic, Christopher Monger described the album as "comfort food with all the trimmings" and that each track was "lovingly crafted, astronomically inoffensive, and wine-drunk silly and sincere". Comparing the album to the holiday-themed releases of Franks' peers, he concluded it was a "testimony to Franks' laid-back demeanor and subtle humor that an entire record of original holiday songs can complement a snowy December day rather than accentuate its forced seasonal cheer".

== Personnel ==
- Michael Franks – vocals
- Charles Blenzig – keyboards, acoustic piano, percussion, sequencing
- Jay Azzolina – guitars
- Romero Lubambo – guitars
- Jay Anderson – double bass
- Billy Kilson – drums
- Café – percussion
- Chris Hunter – saxophones, flute
- Alex Sipiagin – trumpet, flugelhorn
- John Clark – French horn
- Veronica Nunn – backing vocals, vocals (9)

=== Production ===
- John Rosenberg – executive producer
- Charles Blenzig – producer, arrangements
- Michael Franks – producer, photography
- Scott Petito – engineer, mixing
- Megan Denver – art direction, design
- Dion Ogust – portraits
