= Abandoned Garden =

Studio album by Michael Franks
- Released: September 1995
- Studios: Bearsville Studios (Bearsville, New York); Make Believe Ballroom (West Shokan, New York); Power Station, Sound On Sound, Clinton Studios and The Hit Factory (New York City, New York)
- Genres: Smooth jazz; vocal jazz
- Length: 57:02
- Label: Warner Bros.
- Producers: Russell Ferrante; Jimmy Haslip; Matt Pierson; Gil Goldstein; Michael Colina

Michael Franks chronology
Dragonfly Summer (1993)	Abandoned Garden (1995)	The Best of Michael Franks: A Backward Glance (1998)

Abandoned Garden is an album by American vocalist Michael Franks. Released in September 1995 by Warner Bros. Records, it was Franks' thirteenth studio album and his final album of new material with Warner Bros.

== Background ==
The album is a dedication to the memory of Brazilian jazz musician, singer and composer Antônio Carlos Jobim. Franks had drawn artistic inspiration throughout his career from Jobim, and had collaborated with him in the past.

"Somehow Our Love Survives" marked the return of keyboardist and lyricist Joe Sample, with whom Franks had collaborated on numerous albums, including Sleeping Gypsy in 1977 and Blue Pacific in 1990.

== Track listing ==
All tracks are written by Michael Franks, except where noted.

No.	Title	Writer(s)	Length
1.	"This Must Be Paradise"		6:10
2.	"Like Water, Like Wind"		5:19
3.	"A Fool's Errand"		4:35
4.	"Hourglass"		4:45
5.	"Cinema"	Franks, Antônio Carlos Jobim	4:52
6.	"Eighteen Aprils"		4:35
7.	"Somehow Our Love Survives"	Franks, Joe Sample	5:00
8.	"Without Your Love"		5:22
9.	"In the Yellow House"		5:21
10.	"Bird of Paradise"	Djavan, Franks, Max Frederico, Flávia Virgínia	5:39
11.	"Abandoned Garden"		5:24

== Reception ==
Professional ratings
Review scores
Source	Rating
AllMusic	2.5/5 stars
Down Beat	3/5 stars

Writing for AllMusic, Ross Boissoneau praised the input of "heavy hitters" but lamented it was "neither Franks' best effort nor particularly evocative of the great Brazilian composer" the album was dedicated to. He concluded "while the revolving door of stars has served Franks well on other recordings, here they don't seem to add up to much."

Down Beat magazine rated the album "good" in their March 1996 issue, reporting it to be "a genuine keeper, a guilty pleasure. Somehow Franks, a song stylist more than a jazz vocalist, once again gets his way, singing his indelible melodies that before you know it are under your skin, into your veins and etched into your soul..."

== Personnel ==
=== Musicians ===
- Michael Franks – vocals
- Russell Ferrante – acoustic piano (1, 2, 7), arrangements (1, 2, 7)
- Eliane Elias – acoustic piano (3, 5), rhythm arrangements (5)
- Gil Goldstein – acoustic piano (4, 6, 10, 11)
- Bob James – acoustic piano (8)
- Carla Bley – acoustic piano (9), rhythm arrangements (9)
- Chuck Loeb – guitars (1, 2, 7, 9, 11)
- Jeff Mironov – guitars (4, 6, 10, 11), acoustic guitar (8, 9)
- John Leventhal – electric guitar (8), steel guitar (8)
- Jimmy Haslip – bass (1, 2, 7), arrangements (7)
- Christian McBride – bass (3, 5)
- Marc Johnson – bass (4, 6, 10, 11)
- Mark Egan – bass (8)
- Steve Swallow – bass (9)
- Chris Parker – drums (1, 2, 7)
- Lewis Nash – drums (3, 5)
- Peter Erskine – drums (4, 6, 8–11), percussion (9)
- Manolo Badrena – percussion (1, 2, 7, 11)
- Don Alias – percussion (3–6, 8, 10, 11)
- Bashiri Johnson – percussion (4, 6, 8)
- Lawrence Feldman – alto flute (1, 2, 7)
- Bob Mintzer – alto flute (1–3, 7), concert flute (1, 2, 7), horn arrangements (3)
- Michael Brecker – tenor saxophone (3, 5)
- Joshua Redman – soprano saxophone (6)
- Andy Snitzer – alto saxophone (7)
- David Sanborn – alto saxophone (10)
- Keith O'Quinn – trombone (3)
- Randy Brecker – flugelhorn (3)
- Art Farmer – flumpet (9)
- Diane Barere – cello (1, 7)
- Mark Shuman – cello (1, 7)
- Fred Zlotkin – cello (1, 7)
- Michael Colina – arrangements (8)
- Brian Mitchell – vocals (9)

=== Production ===
- Russell Ferrante – producer (1, 2, 7)
- Jimmy Haslip – producer (1, 2, 7)
- Matt Pierson – producer (3–6, 8–11)
- Gil Goldstein – producer (4, 6, 10, 11)
- Michael Colina – co-producer (8)
- James Farber – recording, mixing
- Matthew Lamonica – recording
- Tom Mark – recording
- Glen Marchese – assistant engineer
- Greg Calbi – mastering at Masterdisk (New York, NY)
- Charles Blenzig – music director
- Tony Oates – music director
- Dana Watson – production coordinator
- Don Scardino – project coordinator
- Dana Williams – project coordinator
- Christine Caro – art direction, design
- Ken Schles – photography
- Claudia Franks – additional photography
- Fredrik Nilsen – additional photography
