= Travis Shook =

American jazz pianist

- Born: Larry Travis Shook; March 10, 1969
- Origin: Oroville, California, U.S.
- Genres: Hard bop Jazz fusion Modal jazz Mainstream jazz Post bop
- Instrument: Piano
- Website: travisshook.com

Travis Shook (born March 10, 1969) is an American jazz pianist. He made his eponymous Columbia Records debut in a quartet that included Tony Williams and Bunky Green. He was born in Oroville, California. He received much critical acclaim for this first effort, but failed to hold on to the contract when Sony purged a large percentage of the Columbia jazz roster upon acquiring the label in 1993. After spending some time as a member of the Betty Carter Trio, he dropped out of the public eye for a number of years.

In 1993, Shook and his wife, jazz singer Veronica Nunn, started their own record label, Dead Horse Records, which has released four recordings to date. Shook grew up in Olympia, Washington, moved to New York City in the mid-1990s and currently resides in Woodstock, New York.

== Selected discography ==
=== As leader ===
- Travis Shook (Columbia, 1993)
- Awake
- Travis Shook Plays Kurt Weill
- Travis Shook - Trio

=== As sideman ===
With Sonny Simmons

- American Jungle
- Reincarnation

With Veronica Nunn

- American Lullaby
- Standard Delivery
- The Art of Michael Franks

With Jay Thomas

- Rapture

With Skip Walker

- Tina's Contemplation
