= Veronica Nunn =

American jazz singer (born 1957)

- Born: Veronica Elaine Nunn; October 7, 1957 (age 68); Little Rock, Arkansas, U.S.
- Genres: Jazz
- Occupation: Singer-songwriter
- Label: Dead Horse
- Website: veronicanunn.com

Veronica Elaine Nunn (born October 7, 1957) is an American jazz vocalist, singer-songwriter, producer, recording artist, educator, and podcaster. Internationally recognized for her expressive vocal style and versatility, she is best known as the longtime featured vocalist with singer songwriter, artist Michael Franks.

== Early life and education ==
Nunn was born in Little Rock, Arkansas and was immersed in a variety of musical styles, including gospel and jazz. Her first club performances in Little Rock was with jazz pianist Art Porter, Sr. She moved to New York City in the late 1970s to study theology at Lehman College, supporting herself by singing in clubs in Harlem and Greenwich Village. In New York, she was mentored by saxophonist George "Big Nick" Nicholas. - a key educator of John Coltrane. Nicholas helped her break into the city's jazz scene.

== Career ==
=== Performance and recordings ===
Since 1993, Nunn has been the featured vocalist for Michael Franks. She has appeared on his albums such as Watching the Snow, Rendezvous in Rio, and Time Together.

She co-founded Dead Horse Records in 1997 with her husband, jazz pianist Travis Shook. She serves as Acting CEO of both Dead Horse Records and Full Gallop Entertainment.

She has performed internationally and domestically with a list of artists that includes Eddie Harris, Eddie Durham, Doc Cheatum, Eddie Chamblee, Pheeroan akLaff, Don Byron, Lee Ritenour, Dave Grusin (the G in GRP Records), John Pizzarelli, Jay Anderson, Jaz Sawyer, Jennifer Vincent, Sean Conly, Jacques Schwarz-Bart, James Hurt, Mark Egan, Jay Azzolina, Neil Caine, Roy Hargrove, Astrud & João Gilberto, Michael Bowie, James Carter, Oscar Neves, Rodney Kendricks, Café, Spanky Davis, Manolo Badrena, Ron McClure, Buddy Williams, Bob Cunningham, Bross Townsend, and Xavier Davis and others.

Nunn’s vocal style blends traditional jazz with gospel and blues influences, emphasizing soulful phrasing and lyrical interpretation. In a direct comparison of Veronica Nunn and Michael Franks, PopMatters wrote that "Franks is outsung by a mile in most respects, but you can hear how carefully he places every syllable along the beat, actually swinging the tune more precisely and powerfully than Nunn, who approaches it more as a soul singer".

=== Podcasting ===
In 2013, she launched the podcast Tales From the Jazz Side, which she produces and hosts.

In 2026, she assisted in the launch of Michael Franks' podcast "The And of One", which she produces and co-hosts with Franks.

== Selected discography ==
As leader

- American Lullaby (2002)
- Standard Delivery (2007)
- The Art of Michael Franks (2010)

With Michael Franks

- The Music in My Head
- Time Together
- Watching the Snow
- Rendezvous in Rio

With Travis Shook

- Plays Kurt Weill
- Awake
