= Rendezvous in Rio =

Studio album by Michael Franks
- Released: June 27, 2006
- Studio: Off The Wall Studios (West Caldwell, New Jersey); La Cocina Studios (Hilton Head Island, South Carolina); NRS Recording Studio (Catskill, New York); JHL Sound (Pacific Palisades, California); Dogmatic Sound (Burbank, California); Hedgehog Sound; Burning Down The House
- Genre: Smooth jazz
- Length: 52:33
- Label: Koch
- Producer: Chuck Loeb; Charles Blenzig; Scott Petito; Jeff Lorber; Jimmy Haslip

Michael Franks chronology
Love Songs (2004)	Rendezvous in Rio (2006)	Michael Franks: Original Album Series (2010)

Professional ratings
Review scores
Source	Rating
AllMusic	3.5/5 stars

Rendezvous in Rio is a jazz vocal album by Michael Franks, released in 2006 with Koch Records. It was Franks' sixteenth studio album.

== Track listing ==
All tracks are written by Michael Franks except where noted.

No.	Title	Writer(s)	Length
1.	"Under the Sun"		5:26
2.	"Rendezvous in Rio"	Franks, Charles Blenzig	5:36
3.	"The Cool School"		5:47
4.	"Samba Do Soho"	Paulo Jobim, Ronaldo Bastos	4:40
5.	"The Critics Are Never Kind"		5:16
6.	"Scatsville"		4:27
7.	"The Chemistry of Love"		4:24
8.	"Hearing "Take Five""		5:41
9.	"The Question Is Why"		4:30
10.	"Songbirds"		6:46

== Personnel ==
- Michael Franks – vocals (1, 3, 5–10)
- Chuck Loeb – keyboards (1), synthesizer programming (1, 3), guitars (1, 3), arrangements (1, 3), acoustic piano (3)
- Charles Blenzig – keyboards (2, 4), programming (2, 4), arrangements (2, 4)
- David Sancious – keyboards (5, 10), acoustic piano solo (5)
- Scott Petito – additional keyboards (5, 10), bass (5, 10), arrangements (5, 10)
- Jeff Lorber – keyboards (6, 7), percussion programming (6, 7), arrangements (6, 7), drum programming (7)
- Roger Burn – keyboards (8, 9), acoustic piano (8), vibraphone (8), arrangements (8, 9)
- Romero Lubambo – guitars (2, 4)
- Mark Shulman – guitars (5, 10)
- Dwight Sills – guitars (6, 7)
- Mike DeMicco – guitar solo (10)
- Sergio Brandao – bass (2, 4)
- Alex Al – bass (6)
- Jimmy Haslip – electric bass (8, 9)
- Wolfgang Haffner – drums (1)
- Brian Dunne – drums (3)
- Jerry Marotta – drums (5, 10), percussion (5, 10)
- Michael White – drums (6)
- Vinnie Colaiuta – drums (8, 9)
- Café – percussion (2, 4)
- Chris Hunter – saxophones (2), flute (2, 4)
- Gary Meek – sax section (6), tenor sax solo (6), flute (7)
- Eric Marienthal – alto saxophone (8), tenor saxophone (9)
- Andy Suzuki – woodwinds (8, 9)
- Carmen Cuesta Loeb – vocals (1)
- Robbie Dupree – backing vocals (2), vocals (5)
- Veronica Nunn – backing vocals (2)
- Beth Reineke – backing vocals (2)
- Leslie Ritter – backing vocals (2, 10)
- Pamela Driggs – vocals (4)
- Larry Hoppen – vocals (5)

=== Production ===
- John Rosenberg – executive producer
- Dave Wilkes – A&R
- Chuck Loeb – producer (1, 3)
- Charles Blenzig – producer (2, 4)
- Jeff Lorber – producer (6, 7), recording (6, 7)
- Jimmy Haslip – producer (8, 9)
- Dennis Wall – mixing (1, 3)
- Scott Petito – recording (2, 4, 5, 10), producer (5, 10), vocal recording, mixing, mastering, assembling
- Derek Jones – recording (8, 9)
- Rich Breen – additional recording (8, 9), mixing (8, 9)
- David Channing – additional recording (8, 9)
- Megan Denver – art direction, design, additional photography
- Dennis Jeffrey – additional photography
- Dion Ogust – back cover photography
- Dick Jeffrey – cover painting
