= Michael Franks (album) =

Studio album by Michael Franks
- Released: 1973
- Studio: Western Recorders and Sound Labs (Hollywood, California)
- Genre: Smooth jazz; vocal jazz
- Length: 37:43
- Label: Brut
- Producer: Richard Markowitz

Michael Franks chronology
Michael Franks (1973)	The Art of Tea (1976)

Professional ratings
Review scores
Source	Rating
AllMusic	3/5 stars

Michael Franks is a smooth vocal jazz album and the debut studio album by American singer-songwriter and musician Michael Franks. Released in 1973 with Brut, the album was re-released in 1983 under the title Previously Unavailable.

== Track listing ==
All tracks are written by Michael Franks

Side one
No.	Title	Length
1.	"King of Oklahoma"	3:10
2.	"Dobro Ladies"	2:46
3.	"Three Today"	4:02
4.	"Little Sparrow"	3:02
5.	"Born with the Moon in Virgo"	6:13

Side two
No.	Title	Length
1.	"Just Like Key Largo"	3:32
2.	"Can't Seem to Shake This Rock and Roll"	4:18
3.	"When Blackbirds Fly"	3:15
4.	"Lovesick Lizzie"	3:07
5.	"Life's Little Highway"	4:18

== Personnel ==
- Michael Franks – vocals, acoustic guitar, banjo, mandolin
- Maurice Rodgers – acoustic piano (1), electric piano (5)
- David Paich – acoustic piano (3, 6)
- Larry Muhoberac – acoustic piano (9)
- Louis Shelton – amplified guitar (1, 3, 5, 7, 9)
- Tommy Tedesco – amplified guitar (6)
- Jerry McGee – dobro (2, 4)
- Richard Markowitz – autoharp (3)
- Carol Kaye – bass guitar (1, 5, 7, 9)
- Steve LaFever – bass guitar (2, 8)
- Max Bennett – bass guitar (3, 4, 6, 10)
- Paul Humphrey – drums (1, 5, 7, 9)
- Ed Greene – drums (2, 4, 10)
- Larry Bunker – percussion, drums (3, 6), congas (8)
- Gene Cipriano – English horn (3), baritone saxophone (9)
- Tom Scott – soprano saxophone (5), tenor saxophone (7, 9), flute (7)
- Chauncey Welsch – trombone solo (5)
- Bobby Bruce – violin (4, 6, 7, 10)
- Wendy Waldman – backing vocals, dulcimer (8)

Horn section

- Kenny Shroyer – trombone
- Lloyd Ulyate – trombone
- Chauncey Welsch – trombone
- Ollie Mitchell – trumpet
- Mike Price – trumpet
- Tony Terran – trumpet

=== Production ===
- Richard Markowitz – producer, arrangements and conductor
- Bart Chiate – recording engineer
- Norman Seeff – art direction, photography
