= Blue Pacific (album) =

Studio album by Michael Franks
- Released: May 31, 1990
- Studio: JHL Sound (Pacific Palisades, California); Studio Ultimo and Soundworks West (Los Angeles, California); Ground Control Studios (Burbank, California); Ocean Way Recording and Cherokee Studios (Hollywood, California); Larrabee Sound Studios and Schnee Studios (North Hollywood, California)
- Genre: Smooth jazz; vocal jazz
- Length: 52:24
- Label: Reprise
- Producer: Walter Becker; Tommy LiPuma; Jeff Lorber

Michael Franks chronology
Indispensable (1988)	Blue Pacific (1990)	Dragonfly Summer (1993)

Blue Pacific is a smooth vocal jazz album by American singer-songwriter and musician Michael Franks, released in 1990 with Reprise.

== Background ==
The album marked three notable returns for Franks. The first was a return to the Reprise label since he'd released The Art of Tea in 1976. Tommy LiPuma also returned as producer of three tracks after a ten-year absence, the last album they worked on being One Bad Habit in 1980. Three other tracks on the album were produced by Walter Becker of Steely Dan and the remaining four by Jeff Lorber.

Commentators noted the stylistic return to the more laid back, Brazilian jazz inspired music of his earlier works, as opposed to the more electronic pop sound Franks had experimented with throughout the 1980s.

== Reception ==
Professional ratings
Review scores
Source	Rating
AllMusic	3/5 stars

Writing for AllMusic, Stephen J. Matteo praised Franks' "return to form and his best album since 1979's Tiger in the Rain ", commenting that "[t]he album marked a total rebirth for Franks." He described the album as "[m]editative, lush and clearly the work of an artist intent on making personal music regardless of trends or airplay, Blue Pacific is as open and beautiful as the ocean for which it is named."

Writing in the Orlando Sentinel in the year of the album's release, Susan M. Barbieri commented that "[w]hereas Franks' last effort, The Camera Never Lies, didn't quite click as an album, Blue Pacific does." She described the work as an "easy vocal [stroll] that [lulls] the listener into joining him in a state of calm" and praised the lyrics as "clever pop poetics for which this former English teacher is known."

== Track listing ==
All tracks are written by Michael Franks.

Side one
No.	Title	Length
1.	"The Art of Love"	4:10
2.	"Woman in the Waves"	5:58
3.	"All I Need"	4:46
4.	"Long Slow Distance"	5:09
5.	"Vincent's Ear"	6:21

Side two
No.	Title	Length
1.	"Speak to Me"	5:01
2.	"On the Inside"	5:12
3.	"Chez Nous"	4:29
4.	"Blue Pacific"	4:58
5.	"Crayon Sun (Safe at Home)"	6:20

== Personnel ==
- Michael Franks – vocals
- Jeff Lorber – keyboards (1, 2, 6, 7), programming (1, 2, 6, 7), arrangements (1, 2, 6, 7)
- John Beasley – keyboards (3, 5, 10)
- Joe Sample – acoustic piano (4, 8)
- Larry Williams – synthesizer programming (4, 8, 9), synthesizer arrangements (4, 8, 9)
- Paul Jackson Jr. – guitars (1, 6, 7)
- Buzz Feiten – guitars (2), acoustic guitar (3, 5, 10)
- Dean Parks – electric guitar (3, 5, 10)
- Larry Carlton – guitars (4, 8)
- Michael Thompson – guitars (9)
- Neil Stubenhaus – bass (3, 5, 10)
- 'Ready' Freddie Washington – bass (4, 8)
- John Patitucci – bass (9)
- Sean Franks – cymbals (1, 2, 7)
- Peter Erskine – drums (3, 5, 10)
- John Guerin – drums (4, 8)
- Vinnie Colaiuta – drums (9)
- Luis Conte – percussion (1, 2, 7–9)
- Alex Acuña – percussion (3, 5, 10)
- Michael Fisher – percussion (3, 5, 10)
- Marc Russo – alto saxophone (1, 7)
- Bob Sheppard – tenor saxophone (5)
- Kirk Whalum – tenor saxophone (9)
- Bunny Hull – backing vocals (2, 5, 7)
- Brenda Russell – backing vocals (2, 7)
- Kareem – backing vocals (6)
- Livingston Taylor – backing vocals (10)

=== Production ===
- Jeff Lorber – producer (1, 2, 6, 7), recording (1, 2, 6, 7)
- Walter Becker – producer (3, 5, 10)
- Tommy LiPuma – producer (4, 8, 9)
- Alan Meyerson – mixing (1, 2, 6, 7)
- Roger Nichols – recording (3, 5, 10), mixing (3, 5, 10)
- Al Schmitt – recording (4, 8, 9), additional recording (4, 8, 9)
- Bill Schnee – mixing (4, 8, 9)
- Chris Fuhrman – additional recording assistant (1, 2, 6, 7)
- Gabe Moffat – additional recording assistant (1, 2, 6, 7)
- Neal Pogue – mix assistant (1, 2, 6, 7)
- Tom Hardisty – recording assistant (3, 5, 10)
- Scott Ralston – recording assistant (3, 5, 10)
- Clif Norrell – recording assistant (4, 8, 9)
- Eric Rudd – recording assistant (4, 8, 9)
- Joey Wolpert – additional recording (4, 8, 9)
- Ed Torgerson – additional recording assistant (4, 8, 9)
- Ken Allardyce – mix assistant (4, 8, 9)
- Doug Sax – mastering at The Mastering Lab (Hollywood, California)
- Sonny Abelardo – production coordinator
- Carol Parks – production coordinator
- Jeri and John Heiden – art direction, design
- Kip Lott – photography
- Margaret Kimura – stylist
- Pauline Leonard – stylist
- Gary Borman – management
