= The Camera Never Lies =

Studio album by Michael Franks
- Released: July 7, 1987
- Studio: Flying Monkey Studios, Giant Sound Studios, RPM Studios, Automated Sound Studios and Clinton Recording Studios (New York City, New York)
- Genre: Jazz
- Length: 40:46
- Label: Warner Bros.
- Producer: Rob Mounsey

Michael Franks chronology
Skin Dive (1985)	The Camera Never Lies (1987)	Indispensable: The Best of Michael Franks (1988)

Professional ratings
Review scores
Source	Rating
AllMusic	3/5 stars

The Camera Never Lies is a jazz vocal album by Michael Franks, released in 1987 by Warner Bros. Records.

== Track listing ==
All tracks are written by Michael Franks except where noted.

Side one
No.	Title	Length
1.	"Face to Face"	4:26
2.	"I Surrender"	4:01
3.	"The Camera Never Lies"	3:37
4.	"Lip Service"	4:13
5.	"When I Think of Us"	4:18

Side two
No.	Title	Writer(s)	Length
1.	"Island Life"	Franks, Rob Mounsey	4:17
2.	"Now You're in My Dreams"	Franks, Clifford Carter	4:11
3.	"Doctor Sax"		5:48
4.	"Innuendo"		5:55

== Personnel ==
- Michael Franks – vocals
- Rob Mounsey – keyboards (1–6, 8, 9), programming (1–6, 8, 9), MIDI piano (1), organ (2), keyboard bass (2), backing vocals (2), flute solo (6), synthesizers (7), bass vocals (8)
- Richard Tee – acoustic piano (4)
- Clifford Carter – MIDI piano (7), synthesizers (7)
- Steve Khan – guitars (1, 7), guitar solo (3)
- Hiram Bullock – guitar solo (2)
- Jeff Mironov – rhythm guitar (2), guitars (4), acoustic guitar (6), electric guitar (6)
- Cornell Dupree – guitars (4)
- Georg Wadenius – guitars (8)
- Earl Klugh – acoustic guitar (9)
- Neil Jason – bass (1)
- Marcus Miller – bass (3)
- Mark Egan – 8-string fretless bass (5)
- Dave Weckl – drums (1)
- Chris Parker – cymbals (3, 7, 9), hi-hat (3), drums (7)
- Robin Gould – drums (4)
- Steve Jordan – drums (8)
- Roger Squitero – caxixi (5), shekere (5)
- Ralph MacDonald – congas (6), percussion (6)
- Lawrence Feldman – alto saxophone (1, 2)
- Bill Evans – tenor saxophone (1, 2)
- Michael Brecker – EWI (7), tenor saxophone (8)
- Randy Brecker – trumpet (1, 2)
- Lew Soloff – trumpet (1, 2)
- Michal Urbaniak – MIDI violin (5)
- Kacey Cisyk – backing vocals (1, 4, 5, 8)
- Will Lee – backing vocals (2), bass (4)
- Art Garfunkel – backing vocals (3)
- Patti Austin – backing vocals (4, 8), vocals (7)
- Lani Groves – backing vocals (4, 8)

=== Production ===
- Rob Mounsey – producer, arrangements
- Clifford Carter – arrangements (7)
- Richard Alderson – recording
- Kevin Haplin – recording, remixing
- Jan Wolfson – recording
- Jeff Cox – recording assistant
- Mike Krowiak – recording assistant
- Mike Morgan – recording assistant
- Jordan D'Alesio – remix assistant
- Neil Dignon – remix assistant
- Fred Bova – technical assistance
- George Marino – mastering at Sterling Sound (New York, NY)
- Debbie DeMeo – production coordinator
- Lin Bordenet – production assistant
- Gabrielle Raumberger – art direction, design
- Larry Williams – photography
- Richard Burkhart – management

== Charts ==
Chart (1987)	Peak position
US Top Contemporary Jazz Albums (Billboard)	7
