= John Guerin =

American drummer (1939–2004)

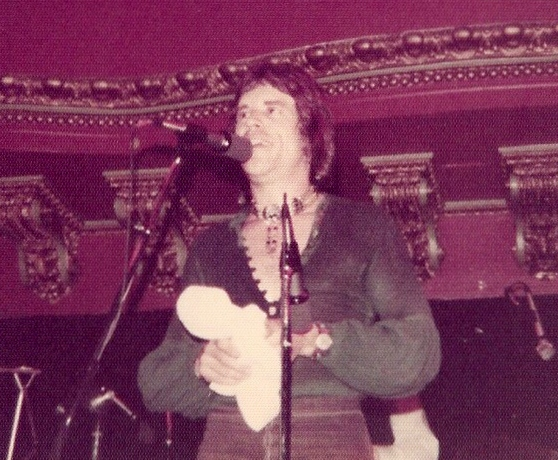
- Guerin in San Francisco, 1976

Background information
- Born: John Payne Guerin; October 31, 1939; Hawaii, U.S.
- Died: January 5, 2004 (aged 64) West Hills, California, U.S.
- Occupation: Musician
- Instrument: Percussion

John Payne Guerin (October 31, 1939 – January 5, 2004) was an American percussionist. He was a proponent of the jazz-rock style.

== Biography ==
Guerin was born in Hawaii and raised in San Diego. As a young drummer, he began performing with Buddy DeFranco in 1960. In the late 1960s, he moved to Los Angeles where he played for artists such as Frank Sinatra, The Beach Boys, George Harrison, Frank Zappa, The Animals, Joni Mitchell, Them, Thelonious Monk, Lou Rawls, Ray Conniff, George Shearing, Peggy Lee, Ella Fitzgerald, Linda Ronstadt, Nelson Riddle and many others.

From July 1972 to January 1973, he was the drummer for The Byrds and joined the L.A. Express later that year. The band served as Joni Mitchell's back-up band on tour during the mid- to late-1970s; Guerin had a brief relationship with Mitchell during that time. She later wrote the song Hejira about leaving him.

Guerin was an exponent of the jazz-rock style and played in many different genres, including for film and television. Among his contributions to motion picture and television scores, Guerin worked on the soundtrack to the 1988 film homage to Charlie Parker, Bird by Clint Eastwood. Those are also his drums on the theme song during the opening credits for the 1968 television series Hawaii Five-O.

In later years, Guerin worked with Oscar Peterson, Jon Faddis, Jimmy Heath, Ray Charles, Sonny Rollins, Justin Morell, Andreas Pettersson, David Basse, David Garfield, Gary Lemel, and Mike Melvoin.

Guerin died of heart failure on January 5, 2004, in West Hills, California.

== Selected discography ==
=== As sideman ===
With David Axelrod

- The Auction (Decca, 1972)
- Seriously Deep (Polydor, 1975)

With The Beach Boys

- 20/20 (Capitol, 1969)
- Sunflower (Reprise, 1970)

With Pat Boone

- Just the Way I Am (Lamb & Lion, 1979)

With Michael Franks

- The Art of Tea (Reprise Records, 1976)
- Sleeping Gypsy (Warner Bros. Records, 1977)
- Blue Pacific (Reprise Records, 1990)

With Terry Garthwaite

- Terry (Arista, 1975)
- Hand in Glove (Fantasy, 1978)

With David Gates

- First (Elektra, 1973)
- Goodbye Girl (Elektra, 1978)

With Jack Jones

- Harbour (RCA Victor, 1974)
- What I Did For Love (RCA Victor, 1975)

With Peggy Lee

- Pass Me By (Capitol Records, 1965)
- Then Was Then – Now Is Now! (Capitol Records, 1965)
- Guitars a là Lee (Capitol Records, 1966)
- Somethin' Groovy! (Capitol Records, 1967)
- Make It With You (Capitol Records, 1970)
- Mirrors (A&M Records, 1975)
- Close Enough for Love (DRG, 1979)

With Melanie

- Photograph (Atlantic, 1976)
- Seventh Wave (Neighbourhood Records, 1983)

With Joni Mitchell

- Court and Spark (Asylum Records, 1974)
- The Hissing of Summer Lawns (Asylum Records, 1975)
- Hejira (Asylum Records, 1976)
- Don Juan's Reckless Daughter (Asylum Records, 1977)
- Wild Things Run Fast (Geffen, 1982)

With Oliver Nelson

- Black, Brown and Beautiful (Flying Dutchman, 1969)
- Zig Zag (Original Motion Picture Score) (MGM, 1970)

With Aaron Neville

- The Grand Tour (A&M Records, 1993)
- Aaron Neville's Soulful Christmas (A&M Records, 1993)

With Tom Pacheco

- The Outsider (RCA, 1976)
- Swallowed Up in the Great American Heartland (RCA Victor, 1976)

With Lou Rawls

- Love All Your Blues Away (Epic, 1986)
- Rawls Sings Sinatra (Savoy, 2003)

With Howard Roberts

- Spinning Wheel (Capitol Records, 1969)
- Antelope Freeway (Impulse!, 1971)

With Emitt Rhodes

- The American Dreams (A&M Records, 1970)

With Linda Ronstadt

- What's New (Asylum Records, 1983)
- Lush Life (Asylum Records, 1984)
- For Sentimental Reasons (Asylum Records, 1986)
- A Merry Little Christmas (Elektra Records, 2000)

With Diane Schuur

- Love Walked In (GRP, 1996)
- Music Is My Life (Atlantic, 1999)

With Seals and Crofts

- Summer Breeze (Warner Bros., 1972)
- Diamond Girl (Warner Bros., 1973)

With Bud Shank

- Magical Mystery (World Pacific, 1967)
- Let It Be (Pacific Jazz, 1970)

With Frank Sinatra

- My Way (Reprise, 1968)
- Ol' Blue Eyes Is Back (Reprise, 1973)

With O. C. Smith

- Together (Caribou, 1977)

With Libby Titus

- Libby Titus (Columbia, 1977)

With Patrick Williams

- Wind, Sky and Diamonds (Impulse!, 1967)
- Threshold (Capitol Records, 1973)

With Frank Zappa

- Lumpy Gravy (Capitol, 1967)
- Hot Rats (Reprise, 1969)
- Chunga's Revenge (Reprise, 1970)
- Apostrophe (') (DiscReet, 1974)
- The Lost Episodes (Rykodisc, 1996)

With others

- Alessi Brothers, Alessi (A&M, 1976)
- Gene Ammons, Brasswind (Prestige, 1974)
- Eric Andersen, Be True To You (Arista, 1975)
- Hoyt Axton, Southbound (A&M Records, 1975)
- Joan Baez, Diamonds & Rust (A&M Records, 1975)
- Stephen Bishop, Careless (ABC, 1976)
- David Blue, Com'n Back for More (Asylum, 1975)
- Blue Mitchell, Blues' Blues (Mainstream, 1972)
- Elkie Brooks, Rich Man's Woman (A&M, 1975)
- Toni Brown, Toni Brown (Fantasy, 1979)
- The Byrds, Banjoman - The Original Soundtrack (recorded 1972, released Sire, 1977) (Various Artists, 2 live tracks by The Byrds)
- Keith Carradine, I'm Easy (Asylum, 1976)
- David Cassidy, Dreams Are Nuthin' More Than Wishes (Bell, 1973)
- Natalie Cole, Stardust (Elektra Records, 1996)
- Priscilla Coolidge and Booker T. Jones, Chronicles (A&M Records, 1973)
- England Dan & John Ford Coley, Fables (A&M, 1972)
- Ned Doheny, Hard Candy (Columbia, 1976)
- Sheena Easton, No Strings (MCA Records, 1993)
- Cass Elliot, Cass Elliot (RCA, 1972)
- Don Ellis, Haiku (MPS, 1974)
- Phil Everly, Star Spangled Springer (RCA Victor, 1973)
- José Feliciano, Como Tú Quieres (RCA Victor, 1984)
- Art Garfunkel, Breakaway (Columbia Records, 1975)
- Cyndi Grecco, Making Our Dreams Come True (Private Stock Records, 1976)
- Hager Twins, Music on the Country Side (Barnaby, 1972)
- Hager Twins, The Hagers (Elektra, 1974)
- George Harrison, Dark Horse (Apple Records, 1974)
- Monk Higgins, Extra Soul Perception (Solid State, 1968)
- Elton John, Duets (Rocket, 1993)
- John Klemmer, Touch (ABC, 1975)
- Leah Kunkel, I Run With Trouble (Columbia, 1980)
- Patti LaBelle, This Christmas (MCA, 1990)
- Dave Loggins, Apprentice (In a Musical Workshop) (Epic, 1974)
- Claudine Longet, Let's Spend the Night Together (Barnaby, 1972)
- Barry Mann, Barry Mann (Casablanca Records, 1980)
- Letta Mbulu, Free Soul (Capitol Records, 1968)
- Bobby McFerrin, Bobby McFerrin (Elektra, 1982)
- Roger McGuinn, Roger McGuinn (Columbia, 1973)
- Liza Minnelli, Gently (Angel Records, 1996)
- The Monkees, The Monkees Present (Colgems, 1969)
- Walter Murphy, Rhapsody in Blue (Private Stock, 1977)
- Anne Murray, Together (Capitol, 1975)
- Harry Nilsson, Harry (RCA Victor, 1969)
- The Oak Ridge Boys, Room Service (ABC, 1978)
- Danny O'Keefe, So Long Harry Truman (Atlantic, 1975)
- Michael Parks, Closing the Gap (MGM, 1970)
- Gram Parsons, GP (Reprise Records, 1973)
- John Pizzarelli, Dear Mr. Cole (Novus, 1994)
- Bonnie Raitt, The Glow (Warner Bros. Records, 1979)
- Helen Reddy, Helen Reddy (Capitol Records, 1971)
- Helen Reddy, Play Me Out (MCA Records, 1981)
- Della Reese, Let Me in Your Life (LMI, 1973)
- Kenny Rogers, Timepiece (Atlantic Records, 1994)
- Buffy Sainte-Marie, Sweet America (ABC, 1976)
- Tom Scott, Rural Still Life (Impulse!, 1968)
- The Singers Unlimited, Feeling Free (Pausa, 1975)
- The Singers Unlimited, A Special Blend (MPS, 1976)
- JD Souther, Black Rose (Asylum Records, 1976)
- American Spring, Spring (United Artists, 1972)
- Barbra Streisand, Butterfly (Columbia Records, 1974)
- The Sylvers, Forever Yours (Casablanca, 1978)
- Gábor Szabó, Light My Fire with Bob Thiele (Impulse!, 1967)
- Valdy, Landscapes (Haida, 1975)
- Sarah Vaughan, Sarah Vaughan with Michel Legrand (Mainstream Records, 1973)
- The Wilsons, Hey Santa! (SBK, 1993)
