= Dragonfly Summer =

1993 smooth vocal jazz album by Michael Franks

Studio album by Michael Franks
- Released: April 13, 1993
- Recorded: 1992–1993
- Studio: Bearsville Studios (Bearsville, New York); Skyline Studios (New York City, New York); JHL Studio (Pacific Palisades, California); Ocean Way Recording (Hollywood, California)
- Genre: Smooth jazz; vocal jazz
- Length: 57:28
- Label: Reprise
- Producer: Michael Franks (executive); Jeff Lorber; The Yellowjackets; Gil Goldstein; Ben Sidran

Michael Franks chronology
Blue Pacific (1990)	Dragonfly Summer (1993)	Abandoned Garden (1995)

Dragonfly Summer is a smooth vocal jazz studio album by American singer-songwriter and musician Michael Franks. It was released in 1993 with Reprise.

== Track listing ==
All tracks are written by Michael Franks, except where noted.

No.	Title	Writer(s)	Length
1.	"Coming to Life"		4:34
2.	"Soul Mate"		4:26
3.	"Dragonfly Summer"		5:00
4.	"Monk's New Tune"		5:42
5.	"Learning What Love Means"		4:14
6.	"I Love Lucy"	Harold Adamson, William Bell, Eliot Daniel, Booker T. Jones	4:37
7.	"Practice Makes Perfect"		4:55
8.	"String of Pearls"		4:32
9.	"Keeping My Eye on You"		4:23
10.	"The Dream"	Russell Ferrante, Franks, Jimmy Haslip, Marc Russo	5:14
11.	"You Were Meant for Me"		4:40
12.	"How I Remember You"		5:11

== Personnel ==
=== Musicians and vocalists ===
- Michael Franks – vocals
- Jeff Lorber – keyboards (1, 2, 5, 7)
- Russell Ferrante – keyboards (3, 4, 8, 10)
- Gil Goldstein – keyboards (6, 12)
- Warren Bernhardt – acoustic piano (9, 11)
- Paul Jackson Jr. – guitars (1, 2, 5, 7)
- Steve Khan – guitars (3, 4, 8, 10)
- Toninho Horta – guitars (6, 12)
- John Pisano – guitars (9, 11)
- Alec Milstein – bass (1, 2, 5, 7)
- Jimmy Haslip – bass (3, 4, 8, 10)
- Steve Rodby – bass (6, 12)
- John Patitucci – bass (9, 11)
- John Robinson – drums (1, 2, 5, 7)
- William Kennedy – drums (3, 4, 8, 10)
- Alex Acuña – drums (9, 11), percussion (9, 11)
- Paulinho da Costa – percussion (1, 2, 5, 7)
- Mino Cinelu – percussion (6, 12)
- Dave Koz – alto saxophone (1, 2, 5, 7)
- Bob Mintzer – soprano saxophone (3, 4, 8, 10), tenor saxophone (3, 4, 8, 10)
- Chris Hunter – alto saxophone (9, 11)
- Marvin Stamm – trumpet (3, 4, 8, 10), flugelhorn (3, 4, 8, 10)
- Eric Benét Jordan – backing vocals (1, 2, 5, 7)
- John Hall – backing vocals (3, 4, 8, 10)
- Lance Hoppen – backing vocals (3, 4, 8, 10)
- Larry Hoppen – backing vocals (3, 4, 8, 10)
- Dan Hicks – guest vocals (9)
- Peggy Lee – guest vocals (11)

Orchestra (Tracks 6 & 12)

- Gil Goldstein – arrangements and conductor
- Harvey Estrin and Lawrence Feldman – flute, recorder
- Jesse Levy, Richard Locker, Charles McCracken and Nathan Stutch – cello
- Lamar Alsop, Ronald Carbone, Harold Coletta Karen Dreyfus, Olivia Koppell and Emanuel Vardi – viola

=== Production ===
- Michael Franks – executive producer
- Jeff Lorber – producer (1, 2, 5, 7), arrangements (1, 2, 5, 7), recording (1, 2, 5, 7)
- Yellowjackets – producers (3, 4, 8, 10), arrangements (3, 4, 8, 10)
- Gil Goldstein – producer (6, 12), arrangements (6, 12)
- Ben Sidran – producer (9, 11)
- Alan Meyerson – mixing (1, 2, 5, 7)
- James Farber – recording (3, 4, 6, 8–12), mixing (6, 9, 11, 12)
- Thomas Mark – recording (3, 4, 8, 10)
- Dan Garcia – mixing (3, 4, 8, 10)
- Allen Sides – recording (9, 11)
- Michael Reiter – assistant engineer
- Eric Rudd – assistant engineer
- David Schiffman – assistant engineer
- Willie Will – assistant engineer
- Dan Sheperd – original demo recording at Soundcheck Studio (New York, NY)
- George Marino – mastering at Sterling Sound (New York, NY)
- Chris Anderson – sequence assembling at Nevessa Studios (Saugerties, NY)
- Sally Poppe – album coordinator
- Christine Cano – art direction, design
- Kip Lott – photography
- Margaret Kimura – hair, make-up
- Borman Entertainment – management

== Reception ==
Professional ratings
Review scores
Source	Rating
AllMusic	3/5 stars

Music critic Alex Henderson had mixed feelings for the album, writing in AllMusic that it "isn't one of the pop/jazz singer's better albums, but it has its moments." He was critical of Peggy Lee's duet in "You Were Meant for Me", but thought highly of the "String of Pearls" and "Monk's New Tune" tracks produced by The Yellowjackets.

Stanton was more positive for his review on Audioholics, commenting that "Michael Franks was in top form for this release: catchy, cynical lyrics and great music from great musicians."
