= Skin Dive =

Studio album by Michael Franks
- Released: 1985
- Studio: Automated Sound Studios, Clinton Recording Studios and Skyline Studios (New York City, New York)
- Genre: Jazz, Pop
- Length: 41:45
- Label: Warner Bros.
- Producer: Rob Mounsey

Michael Franks chronology
Passionfruit (1983)	Skin Dive (1985)	The Camera Never Lies (1987)

Professional ratings
Review scores
Source	Rating
AllMusic	2.5/5 stars

Skin Dive is a jazz vocal album by Michael Franks, released in 1985 with Warner Bros. Records. It was Franks' ninth studio album, and the first he co-produced himself. The single off this album, "Your Secret's Safe With Me", is his biggest Adult Contemporary hit, peaking at No. 4.

== Track listing ==
All tracks are written by Michael Franks, unless otherwise stated.

Side one
No.	Title	Writer(s)	Length
1.	"Read My Lips"		3:38
2.	"Let Me Count The Ways"		4:33
3.	"Your Secret's Safe with Me"		4:38
4.	"Don't Be Shy"	Michael Franks, Rob Mounsey	5:06
5.	"When I Give My Love To You"		4:21

Side two
No.	Title	Length
1.	"Queen Of The Underground"	4:25
2.	"Now I Know Why (They Call It Falling)"	4:53
3.	"Please Don't Say Goodnight"	4:50
4.	"When She Is Mine"	5:25

== Personnel ==
Vocalists and Musicians

- Michael Franks – vocals
- Rob Mounsey – synthesizers, programming, backing vocals (2–4, 6, 8), Yamaha DX7 (8)
- Clifford Carter – acoustic piano (3)
- Warren Bernhardt – acoustic piano (9)
- Hiram Bullock – guitars (1, 6)
- Hugh McCracken – guitars (2)
- Steve Khan – guitar solo (3)
- Jeff Mironov – electric guitar (7), acoustic guitar (7), guitars (8)
- Marcus Miller – bass (1)
- Will Lee – bass (2, 6), backing vocals (3, 6)
- Neil Jason – bass (3)
- Mark Egan – bass (8)
- Ron Carter – bass (9)
- Chris Parker – Simmons SDS7 programming, Simmons drums, (1, 2, 4–6, 8), drums (3)
- Danny Gottlieb – drums (7), cymbals (7)
- Andy Newmark – drums (8)
- Steve Gadd – drums (9)
- Manolo Badrena – percussion (8)
- Sue Evans – percussion (8)
- David Sanborn – alto saxophone (4, 7)
- Bill Evans – flute (8)
- Ronnie Cuber – baritone saxophone (9)
- Michael Brecker – tenor saxophone (9)
- Lawrence Feldman – alto flute (9)
- George Young – alto flute (9)
- Dave Bargeron – euphonium (9)
- Jon Faddis – flugelhorn (9)
- Jon Clarke – French horn (9)
- Peter Gordon – French horn (9)
- Vivian Cherry – backing vocals (1, 2, 4)
- Frank Floyd – backing vocals (1)
- Babi Floyd – backing vocals (2, 4)
- Leslie Miller– backing vocals (2, 4)
- Brenda Russell – vocals (5), backing vocals (5)
- Joe Caro – backing vocals (6)
- Kacey Cisyk – backing vocals (8)

Production

- Rob Mounsey – producer, arrangements
- Kevin Halpin – recording, remixing (1–5, 7–9)
- Ed Rak – recording, remixing (6)
- Ben Wisch – recording
- Blaine Cone – recording assistant
- Maureen Thompson – recording assistant
- David Young – recording assistant
- George Marino – original mastering at Sterling Sound (New York, NY)
- Lee Herschberg – CD remastering
- Debbie DeMeo – production coordinator
- Laura LiPuma – art direction, design
- Barry McKinley – photography
