= Michael Franks (musician) =

American singer and songwriter (born 1944)

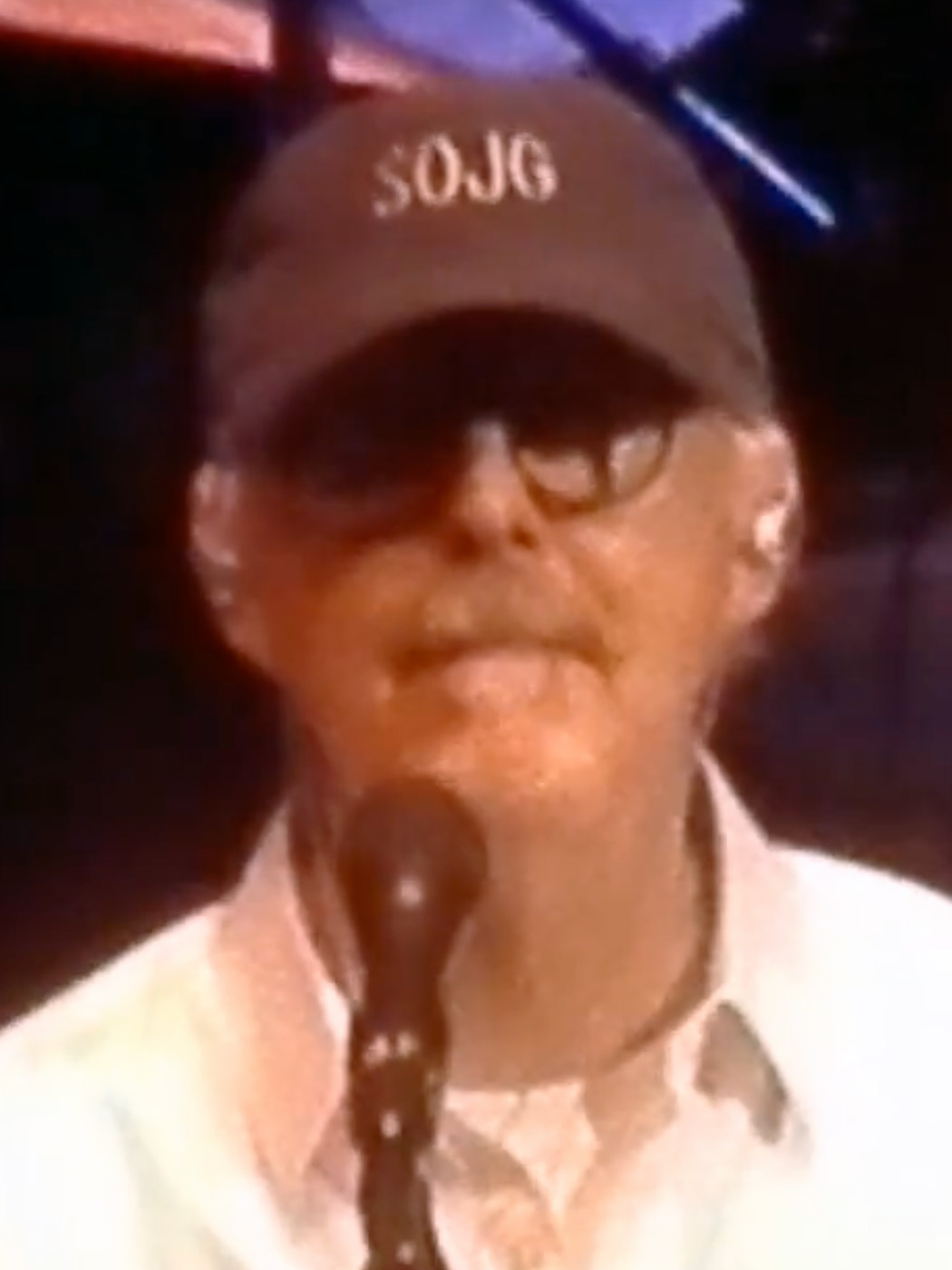
- Franks in 2019

Background information
- Born: September 18, 1944 (age 82); La Jolla, California, U.S.
- Genres: Pop; smooth jazz
- Occupation: Singer-songwriter
- Instruments: Vocals; guitar; banjo; mandolin; cabasa
- Years active: 1973–present
- Labels: Reprise/Warner Bros., Koch, Shanachie
- Website: michaelfranks.com

Michael Franks (born September 18, 1944) is an American singer and songwriter. He has recorded with a variety of well-known artists, such as Peggy Lee, Dan Hicks, Patti Austin, Art Garfunkel, Brenda Russell, Claus Ogerman, Joe Sample, and David Sanborn. His songs have been recorded by Gordon Haskell, Shirley Bassey, The Carpenters, Kurt Elling, Diana Krall, Patti LaBelle, Lyle Lovett, The Manhattan Transfer, Leo Sidran, Veronica Nunn, Carmen McRae, Ringo Starr and Natalie Cole.

== Biography ==
Franks grew up in southern California with his father Jerry, his mother Betty, and two younger sisters. Although no one in his family was a musician, his parents loved swing music, and his early influences included Peggy Lee, Nat King Cole, George Gershwin, Irving Berlin, and Johnny Mercer. At age 14 Franks bought his first guitar, a Japanese Marco Polo for $29.95 with six private lessons included; those lessons were the only music education that he received.

At University High School in San Diego, Franks discovered the poetry of Theodore Roethke with his off-rhymes and hidden meter. In high school, he began singing folk-rock, accompanying himself on guitar. Studying English at UCLA, Michael discovered Dave Brubeck, Patti Page, Stan Getz, João Gilberto, Antonio Carlos Jobim, and Miles Davis. He never studied music in college or later, but earned a Bachelor of Arts degree from UCLA in comparative literature in 1966 and a Master of Arts degree from the University of Oregon in 1968. He had a teaching assistantship in a PhD program in American literature at the University of Montreal before returning to teach part-time at UCLA.

During this time Franks started writing songs, starting with the antiwar musical Anthems in E-Flat Calliope (1968) starring Mark Hamill. He also composed music for the films Cockfighter (1974), starring Warren Oates, and Zandy's Bride (1974), starring Liv Ullmann and Gene Hackman. Sonny Terry and Brownie McGhee recorded three of his songs, including "White Boy Lost in the Blues" on their album Sonny & Brownie. Franks played guitar, banjo and mandolin on the album and joined them in touring. In 1973, he recorded an eponymous album, later reissued as Previously Unavailable, which included the minor hit "Can't Seem to Shake This Rock 'n' Roll."

In 1976 Franks released his second album The Art of Tea, which saw Franks begin a long relationship with Warner Bros. Records. The Art of Tea featured Joe Sample, Larry Carlton, and Wilton Felder of the Crusaders and included the hit song "Popsicle Toes". His third album, Sleeping Gypsy (1977), which includes the song "The Lady Wants to Know", was partially recorded in Brazil. Around this time, percussionist Ray Armando gave Franks a cabasa, which became a signature instrument for him to play on stage when he was not playing guitar. Burchfield Nines (1978), which includes the song "When the Cookie Jar Is Empty," reflects his move to New York City and features more of an East Coast sound. Since then, Franks has recorded more than 15 albums.

His best known works include "When I Give My Love to You," "Popsicle Toes," "Monkey See, Monkey Do," "Lotus Blossom," "Tiger in the Rain," "Rainy Night in Tokyo," "Mr. Smooth", and "Tell Me All About It." His biggest hit came in 1983 with "When Sly Calls (Don't Touch That Phone)" from the album Passionfruit. Radio hits include "Your Secret's Safe With Me" from 1985's Skin Dive, and "Island Life" from 1987's The Camera Never Lies.

Michael Franks also recorded his cover version of "Christmas Time Is Here" (the Christmas classic) with jazz pianist David Benoit released in 1996 on Benoit's Christmas album Remembering Christmas.

== Discography ==
Michael Franks discography
- Studio albums: 18
- Live albums: 1
- Compilation albums: 5

=== Studio albums ===
Year	Album	Label	US 200	Aus (Kent Music Report)	US Jazz
1973	Michael Franks	Brut; Reissued in 1983 on DRG as Previously Unavailable	-	-	-
1975	The Art of Tea	Reprise/Warner Bros.	131	–	–
1977	Sleeping Gypsy	Warner Bros.	119	–	–
1978	Burchfield Nines	Warner Bros.	90	–	–
1979	Tiger in the Rain	Warner Bros.	68	65	–
1980	One Bad Habit	Warner Bros.	83	76	–
1982	Objects of Desire	Warner Bros.	45	95	–
1983	Passionfruit	Warner Bros.	141	–	4
1985	Skin Dive	Warner Bros.	137	–	–
1987	The Camera Never Lies	Warner Bros.	147	–	7
1990	Blue Pacific	Reprise/Warner Bros.	121	–	–
1993	Dragonfly Summer	Warner Bros.	–	–	19
1995	Abandoned Garden	Warner Bros.	–	–	4
1999	Barefoot on the Beach	Windham Hill/BMG	–	–	9
2003	Watching the Snow	Sleeping Gypsy/Rhino/Atlantic; Re-released in 2007 on Koch Records	–	–	40
2006	Rendezvous in Rio	Koch Records	–	–	11
2011	Time Together	Shanachie	–	–	4
2018	The Music in My Head	Shanachie	–	–	

=== Live albums ===
Year	Album	Label	Aus (Kent Music Report)
1980	Michael Franks with Crossfire Live	Warner Bros.	92

=== Compilation albums ===
Year	Album	Label	Jazz
1983	Best Collection 1975–1983	Warner Bros.	–
1988	Indispensable	Warner Bros.	–
1998	The Best of Michael Franks: A Backward Glance	Warner Bros.	23
2003	The Michael Franks Anthology: The Art of Love	Warner Bros.	–
2004	Love Songs	Warner Bros.	–
2012	Michael Franks: Original Album Series	Rhino/Atlantic	–
2012	The Dream 1973-2011	Warner Bros.	–

=== Singles ===
1975 – Popsicle Toes (U.S. Pop No. 43, U.S. AC No. 45)
1977 – The Lady Wants to Know
1978 – When the Cookie Jar Is Empty
1979 – When It's Over
1980 – On My Way Home to You
1980 – One Bad Habit
1980 – Baseball
1982 – Jealousy
1982 – Love Duet (with Renee Diggs)
1982 – Comin' Home to You
1983 – Can't Seem to Shake This Rock 'n Roll
1985 – Your Secret's Safe with Me (U.S. AC No. 4, Canada AC No. 9)
1985 – When I Give My Love to You (with Brenda Russell)
1985 – Queen of the Underground
1987 – Island Life
1987 – The Camera Never Lies
1987 – Doctor Sax / Face to Face
1990 – The Art of Love (U.S. R&B No. 59)
1990 – Speak to Me (U.S. R&B No. 73)
1991 – Practice Makes Perfect
1991 – Woman in the Waves
1992 – The Dream (with Yellowjackets)
1993 – Soulmate
1996 – Christmas Time Is Here (with David Benoit)
2003 – Christmas in Kyoto
2004 – Smash Up 1

=== Appears on ===
Year	Album	Artist	Label
1995	Jazz to the World	V.A.	Blue Note
2006	Live Wires	Yellowjackets	GRP/Verve/Universal
2010	The Art of Michael Franks	Veronica Nunn	Dead Horse Records
