= Passionfruit (album) =

Studio album by Michael Franks
- Released: 1983
- Recorded: 1983
- Studio: Automated Sound Studios, Skyline Studios and Mediasound Studios (New York City, New York)
- Genre: Smooth jazz
- Length: 43:45
- Label: Warner Bros.
- Producer: Rob Mounsey

Michael Franks chronology
Objects of Desire (1982)	Passionfruit (1983)	Skin Dive (1985)

Professional ratings
Review scores
Source	Rating
AllMusic	2.5/5 stars
People	(favourable)

Passionfruit is a jazz vocal album by American musician Michael Franks, produced and arranged by Rob Mounsey and released in 1983 on Warner Bros. Records. The album reached No. 4 on the Billboard Traditional Jazz Albums chart.

== Covers ==
"Sunday Morning Here with You" was covered by Claire Martin. "Tell Me All About It" was also covered by artists such as Natalie Cole, Chris Barber, Will Downing, Gordon Haskell and Michael Lington featuring Dave Koz.

== Track listing ==
All tracks are written by Michael Franks

No.	Title	Length
1.	"Alone At Night"	4:30
2.	"Never Satisfied"	3:52
3.	"Amazon"	5:40
4.	"Now That Your Joystick's Broke"	2:48
5.	"Sunday Morning Here with You"	4:33
6.	"Never Say Die"	3:36
7.	"Rainy Night In Tokyo"	4:42
8.	"Tell Me All About It"	4:33
9.	"When Sly Calls (Don't Touch That Phone)"	5:53
10.	"How The Garden Grows"	3:38

== Personnel ==
Musicians and Vocalists

- Michael Franks – vocals, backing vocals (6)
- Rob Mounsey – synthesizers, acoustic piano (1), Fender Rhodes (2, 3, 7–9), breathalyzer solo (5)
- Pat Rebillot – Fender Rhodes (5), acoustic piano (6)
- Hiram Bullock – guitar solo (1), guitars (4)
- Jeff Mironov – guitars (1, 2, 9), classical guitar (3, 8, 10), acoustic guitar (6), D'Aquisto electric-acoustic guitar (7)
- Hugh McCracken – 12-string guitar (3), tiples (3)
- John Tropea – guitars (5), electric guitar (6, 10)
- Will Lee – bass (1–3, 7, 9), backing vocals (1–3, 7)
- Neil Jason – bass (5, 6, 10), 8-string bass (8)
- Chris Parker – drums (1–3, 7, 9), ice bells (6)
- Steve Gadd – drums (5, 6, 8, 10)
- Sue Evans – percussion (2, 5, 7, 9, 10), salt packets (8)
- Naná Vasconcelos – percussion (3), caxixi (7), tambourine (7)
- Dave Tofani – alto saxophone (1)
- Eddie Daniels – alto flute (1), alto flute solo (3)
- George Marge – alto recorder (7)
- Jon Faddis – flugelhorn (1)
- Randy Brecker – trumpet solo (1), flugelhorn solo (9)
- Toots Thielemans – harmonica (2, 10)
- Hamish Stuart – backing vocals (1–3, 7)
- Kacey Cisyk – backing vocals (2, 3, 6, 7, 9)
- Lesley Miller – backing vocals (2, 3, 6, 7, 9)
- Astrud Gilberto – backing vocals (3)
- Kenny Rankin – backing vocals (5)
- Frank Floyd – Sly's voice (9)

String section

- David Nadien – concertmaster
- Homer Mensch and John Miller – double bass
- Jonathan Abramowitz, Warren Lash and Charles McCracken – cello
- Gloria Agostini – harp
- Lamar Alsop, Judy Geist, Theodore Israel and Emanuel Vardi – viola
- Elena Barere, Lew Eley, Barry Finclair, Regis Iandiorio, Charles Libove, Jan Mullen, John Pintavalle, Matthew Raimondi, Richard Sortomme and Gerald Tarack – violin

=== Production ===
- Rob Mounsey – producer, arrangements
- Artie Friedman – track recording, mixing
- Ed Rak – track recording, string recording
- Marti Robertson – track recording
- Michael Christopher – assistant engineer
- Roger Moutenot – assistant engineer
- Arthur Payson – assistant engineer
- Maureen Thompson – assistant engineer
- George Marino – mastering at Sterling Sound (New York, NY)
- Simon Levy – art direction
- Laura LiPuma – design
- Barry McKinley – photography
