= Tiger in the Rain =

Studio album by Michael Franks
- Released: 1979
- Recorded: November 1978
- Studio: A&R Recording (New York, NY)
- Genre: Smooth jazz
- Length: 40:48
- Label: Warner Bros.
- Producer: John Simon

Michael Franks chronology
Burchfield Nines (1978)	Tiger in the Rain (1979)	One Bad Habit (1980)

Tiger in the Rain is an album by singer-songwriter Michael Franks, released in 1979 on Warner Bros.

It was his first album not produced by Tommy LiPuma, Al Schmitt, and Lee Hershberg. The album was arranged and produced by John Simon. Franks plays guitar, banjo, and mandolin. The album cover features "Tiger in a Tropical Storm", an oil painting by Henri Rousseau.

== Reception ==
Professional ratings
Review scores
Source	Rating
AllMusic	3/5 stars

A. Colin Flood wrote in Enjoy the Music magazine that the album "[continues to] express Franks’ original synthesis of smooth jazz/rock fusion, again with the understated South American underbeats" that "subsides into clever adult sentiments. This album celebrates an easy life of success."

For PopMatters, Rob Caldwell praised the "clever turn[s] of phrase" that work at a "symbolic level (Franks wasn’t a literature major for nothing)" and "[t]here’s something to be said for escapism, for the armchair-travelling Michael Franks’ music offers."

Music critic Stephen J. Matteo commented for AllMusic the album was "[l]ush, romantic and more experimental than previous efforts" and that while "none of its songs has the instant appeal of some of his earlier writing, the album as a whole is as refreshing and meditative as a stroll through a rain forest."

== Track listing ==
All tracks are written by Michael Franks.

Side one
No.	Title	Length
1.	"Sanpaku"	4:10
2.	"When It's Over"	3:03
3.	"Living on the Inside"	5:36
4.	"Hideaway"	4:09
5.	"Jardin Botanico"	3:32

Side two
No.	Title	Length
1.	"Underneath the Apple Tree"	5:52
2.	"Tiger in the Rain"	4:17
3.	"Satisfaction Guaranteed"	3:39
4.	"Lifeline"	6:10

== Charts ==
Chart (1979)	Peak position
Australian (Kent Music Report)	65

== Personnel ==
=== Musicians ===
- Michael Franks – vocals
- Kenny Barron – acoustic piano (1, 3–7, 9)
- Paul Griffin – organ (1, 8, 9)
- Bob Leinbach – organ (2)
- Dominic Cortese – concertina (9)
- Joe Caro – electric guitar (1, 2, 8, 9), acoustic guitar (2, 5)
- Bucky Pizzarelli – acoustic guitar (3, 6, 7), electric guitar (4)
- Herb Bushler – bass guitar (1, 2, 5, 8, 9)
- Ron Carter – acoustic bass (3, 4, 6, 7)
- Rick Marotta – drums (1, 5, 8, 9)
- Buddy Williams – drums (2)
- Ben Riley – drums (3, 4, 6, 7)
- Rubens Bassini – percussion (1, 2, 4, 5, 7, 9)
- Errol "Crusher" Bennett – congas (1, 5)
- Mike Mainieri – vibraphone (3, 4, 7)
- John Simon – percussion (4)
- Seldon Powell – tenor saxophone (4), soprano saxophone (7)
- Dave Liebman – flute solo (5), first flute solo (6), flute (9)
- George Young – tenor saxophone solo (6), second flute solo (6), flute (9)
- David Sanborn – alto saxophone solo (8)
- Howard Leshaw – flute (9)
- Lew Soloff – piccolo trumpet (9)
- Hilda Harris – backing vocals (1, 9)
- Flora Purim – backing vocals (1, 2, 9)
- Maretha Stewart – backing vocals (1, 9)

Horns

Horn section (Tracks 6 & 8)

- Lew Del Gatto – baritone saxophone (6)
- Lou Marini – alto saxophone (6), tenor saxophone (8)
- George Young — tenor saxophone (6)
- David Sanborn – alto saxophone (8)
- Tom Malone – trombone (6, 8)
- Claudio Roditi – trumpet (6)
- Randy Brecker – trumpet (8)
- John Clark – French horn (6, 8)

Strings

String quartet (Track 3)

- Abdul Wadud – cello
- Harold Coletta – viola
- Harry Lookofsky – concertmaster
- Charles Libove – violin

String section (Track 9)

- Harry Lookofsky – concertmaster
- Jesse Levy, Charles McCracken, Allan Shulman and Abdul Wadud – cello
- Harold Coletta, Richard Maximoff and Emanuel Vardi – viola
- Lewis Eley, Charles Libove, Harry Lookofsky, Joseph Malin, Anthony Posk, Richard Sortomme and Harry Urbont – violin

=== Production ===
- John Simon – producer, arrangements
- Glenn Berger – recording, mixing
- Howie Silberberg – second engineer
- Lee Herschberg – CD remastering
- Bob Kuttruf – production assistant
- Henri Rousseau – cover painting
- John Calbaka – art direction
- Claudia Franks – design, photography
- Fred Heller – management
