= Charles Blenzig =

- Born: The Bronx, New York, U.S.
- Genres: Jazz, jazz fusion, pop
- Occupations: Musician, composer, arranger
- Instruments: Piano, percussion

Charles Blenzig (born August 12, 1958) is an American jazz pianist, composer, arranger, producer, and educator.

In the mid 1980s Blenzig joined the Gil Evans Monday Night Orchestra that performed weekly at Sweet basil Jazz Club. Blenzig has performed with Michael Brecker, Marcus Miller, Bill Evans, Hiram Bullock, Lew Soloff, Kenwood Dennard, Eddie Gómez, Dave Weckl, Joe Locke, Harvey Mason, Joe Beck, and Italian rapper Jovanotti

He has been musical director for singer-songwriter Michael Franks since 1990 and for Latin jazz saxophonist Gato Barbieri. He has toured extensively throughout the world as a leader and sideman, including South Africa, Indonesia, Thailand, Japan, Republic of Georgia, Europe, and Korea.

He is a member of the Purchase Conservatory Jazz Department faculty with Jon Faddis, Hal Galper, and Todd Coolman.

== Discography ==
=== As leader ===
- Charles Blenzig (Chase Music Group, 1989)
- Say What You Mean (Big World Music, 1993)
- Certain Standards (Truspace Records, 1997)
- It's About Time (Double-Time, 2003)

=== As guest ===
- New York Cats, Fabio Mogera (Alpha Music, 2014)
- A Kid's Christmas – Julia Blenzig (K Records, 2013)
- Perfect Sky – JY Lee (Truespace, 2012)
- Time Together – Michael Franks (Shanachie, 2011)
- Oh Yea – Jovanatti & Soleluna NY Lab (Verve, 2010)
- Turnaround – Michael Treni (Bell Productions, 2009)
- Detour Jazz Composers Workshop Orchestra (2008)
- Sakura – Vinnie Cutro (Royal Music Ensemble, 2008)
- Strange Energies – Blenzig, Renzi, Villani (Callgola, 2007)
- Rendezvous in Rio – Michael Franks (Koch, 2006)
- Local Dialect – Jay Azzolina (Garagista Music, 2006)
- Asianergy – Jack Lee (Truspace, 2005)
- Wild Terry Silverlight (Terry Silverlight Music, 2004)
- Watching the Snow – Michael Franks (Sleeping Gypsy Music, 2003)
- Close Your Eyes – Mike Fahn (Sparky Productions, 2002)
- The Spirit Within – Ricky Sebastian (STR Digital, 2002)
- New York Sketch – Jack Lee (TruSpace Music, 2001)
- Bewitching – Toku (SME, 2001)
- Past Tense – Jay Azzolina (Doubletime, 2000)
- Barefoot on the Beach – Michael Franks (Windham Hill, 1999)
- Where My Heart Goes – Jack Lee (TruSpace, 1998)
- Walk Your Dogma – Mike Pope (Walk Your Dogma Music, 1996)
- Live in Europe – Bill Evans (Lipstick, 1995)
- Gracefulee – Jack Lee (Polydor, 1994)
- Grove Island – Takeshi Itoh (East West, 1994)
- Flight of the Spirit – Norman Headman (Monad, 1994)
- Just Advance – Kenwood Dennard (Big World, 1992)
