= Objects of Desire (album) =

Studio album by Michael Franks
- Released: 1982
- Studios: Minot Sound (White Plains, New York); Warner Bros. Recording Studios and Jennifudy Recording Studios (North Hollywood, California); Room 335 (Hollywood, California)
- Genre: Jazz
- Length: 39:10
- Label: Warner Bros.
- Producers: Michael Colina; Ray Bardani

Michael Franks chronology
Michael Franks with Crossfire Live (1980)	Objects of Desire (1982)	Passionfruit (1983)

Professional ratings
Review scores
Source	Rating
AllMusic	3/5 stars
The Rolling Stone Jazz Record Guide	3/5 stars

Objects of Desire is a jazz vocal album by Michael Franks, released in 1982 with Warner Bros. Records. It was Franks' seventh studio album.

== Track listing ==
All tracks are written by Michael Franks.

Side one
No.	Title	Length
1.	"Jealousy"	3:35
2.	"Ladies' Nite"	4:08
3.	"No Deposit Love"	5:10
4.	"Laughing Gas"	3:22
5.	"Wonderland"	5:00

Side two
No.	Title	Length
1.	"Tahitian Moon"	4:34
2.	"Flirtation"	3:42
3.	"Love Duet"	4:58
4.	"No One But You"	4:43

== Charts ==
Chart (1982)	Peak position
Australian (Kent Music Report)	95

== Personnel ==
=== Musicians and Vocalists ===
- Michael Franks – vocals, backing vocals (2, 5, 8), rhythm arrangements
- Rob Mounsey – electric piano (1, 9), Oberheim OB-Xa (1, 2, 5), brass arrangements (1, 4, 7), Prophet-5 (2, 5, 7), Fender Rhodes (4, 6–8), acoustic piano (8)
- Michael Colina – rhythm arrangements, ARP synthesizer (2, 9), Oberheim OB-Xa (3, 4, 6, 8), Moog bass (5), antique cymbals (6), string arrangements (8)
- Bette Sussman – Fender Rhodes (2)
- Ted Lo – Fender Rhodes (3, 5)
- Nick Moroch – electric guitar (1–3, 6, 7), acoustic guitar (6)
- Larry Carlton – electric guitar solo (3)
- Joe Caro – electric guitar (4, 9)
- Hugh McCracken – electric guitar (8)
- Steve Khan – classical guitar (9)
- Francisco Centeno – bass guitar (1, 7, 8)
- Neil Jason – bass guitar (2, 3, 6)
- Mark Egan – bass guitar (4, 5, 9)
- Buddy Williams – drums (1, 7, 9)
- Andy Newmark – drums (2, 3, 5, 6)
- Rick Cutler – drums (4)
- Harvey Mason – drums (8)
- Victor Feldman – percussion (3, 8), congas (8)
- Rubens Bassini – percussion (4, 9), congas (9)
- Ray Bardani – Rhythm Tech tambourine (7, 8)
- Lawrence Feldman – alto saxophone (1, 4, 7), tenor sax solo (7), flute (9)
- Michael Brecker – tenor saxophone (1, 7), tenor sax solo (4)
- David Sanborn – alto sax solo (6, 8)
- Randy Brecker – trumpet (1, 7), flugelhorn (4)
- Lew Soloff – trumpet (1, 7), flugelhorn (4)
- Jill Jaffee and City Strings – strings (8)
- S. Renee Diggs – backing vocals (1, 5, 8), vocals (8)
- Yvonne Lewis – backing vocals (1)
- Ullanda McCullough – backing vocals (1, 5)
- Bonnie Raitt – vocals (2), backing vocals (2)
- Kasey Cisyk – backing vocals (5)
- Leslie Miller – backing vocals (5)
- Randy Vanwarmer – backing vocals (6)
- Luther Vandross – backing vocals (7)
- Tawatha Agee – backing vocals (7)
- Phillip Ballou – backing vocals (7)

=== Production ===
- Michael Colina – producer
- Ray Bardani – producer, recording, mixing
- George Marino – mastering at Sterling Sound (New York, NY)
- Tim Holland – production assistant
- Katherine Jewell – production coordinator (NYC)
- Noel Newbolt – production coordinator (LA)
- Simon Levy – art direction, design
- Barry McKinley – cover photography
- Paul Gauguin – cover painting
