= One Bad Habit (album) =

1980 studio album by Michael Franks

Studio album by Michael Franks
- Released: April 16, 1980
- Studio: Power Station (New York City, New York); Capitol Studios (Hollywood, California)
- Genre: Jazz
- Length: 38:08
- Label: Warner Bros.
- Producer: Tommy LiPuma; André Fischer

Michael Franks chronology
Tiger in the Rain (1979)	One Bad Habit (1980)	Michael Franks with Crossfire Live (1980)

Professional ratings
Review scores
Source	Rating
AllMusic	2.5/5 stars
The Rolling Stone Jazz Record Guide	3/5 stars

One Bad Habit is a vocal album by Michael Franks, released in 1980 by Warner Bros. Records. It was Franks' sixth studio album and the first to receive significant radio play in the United States.

== Critical reception ==
A review in the May 3, 1980, issue of Billboard lauded Franks's "cool, airy harmonies gliding over his silky melodylines [sic]" and noted that the songs "He Tells Himself He's Happy" and "Still Life" are reminiscent of Paul Simon's "I Do It for Your Love" and "Still Crazy After All These Years" because of their "understated lyrical beauty." (Later in 1980 Simon released One-Trick Pony, his follow-up to 1975's Still Crazy After All These Years as well as the soundtrack album to the film of the same name, written by and starring Simon; in his review for Rolling Stone magazine, Stephen Holden referred to the tracks "That's Why God Made the Movies" and "Oh, Marion" as "lighter exercises in the hip-jive style of Michael Franks.")

== Track listing ==
All tracks are written by Michael Franks, unless otherwise noted.

Side one
No.	Title	Writer(s)	Length
1.	"Baseball"		3:50
2.	"Inside You"		4:11
3.	"All Dressed Up with Nowhere to Go"		3:47
4.	"Lotus Blossom"	Michael Franks, Don Grolnick	4:15
5.	"On My Way Home to You"		4:52

Side two
No.	Title	Length
1.	"One Bad Habit"	4:06
2.	"Loving You More and More"	3:44
3.	"Still Life"	4:12
4.	"He Tells Himself He's Happy"	5:11

== Charts ==
Chart (1980)	Peak position
Australian (Kent Music Report)	76

== Personnel ==
=== Musicians ===
- Michael Franks – vocals, rhythm arrangements, BGV arrangements
- Don Grolnick – Fender Rhodes (1, 7), clavinet (7), acoustic piano (8)
- Tennyson Stephens – pianos (2), acoustic piano solo (2), Fender Rhodes (3–6, 9), clavinet (3), acoustic piano (9)
- Larry Williams – synthesizers (4, 6), synthesizer arrangements (4)
- David Spinozza – guitars (1, 7), acoustic guitar (2, 8), electric guitar (2, 8), rhythm guitar (6)
- Hugh McCracken – guitars (3)
- Rick Zunigar – guitars (3), acoustic guitar (4)
- George Sopuch – rhythm guitar (4), electric guitar (4), guitars (5)
- Eric Gale – guitars (4, 6, 9)
- Neil Jason – bass (1, 7)
- Dennis Belfield – bass (2–6, 9)
- Eddie Gómez – acoustic bass (8)
- Rick Marotta – drums (1–4, 7)
- Ray Armando – percussion (1, 3), congas (3)
- Lenny Castro – percussion (2, 5, 7)
- André Fischer – rhythm arrangements, percussion (2, 5, 6, 9), tambourine (4), drums (5, 6, 8, 9)
- Clare Fischer – string arrangements and conductor (2)
- Yolande Howard – backing vocals (1, 9)
- Petsye Powell – backing vocals (1, 9)
- Silvia Shemwell – backing vocals (1, 9)

Horn section

- Jerry Hey – horns, horn arrangements and conductor (1, 3, 5), flugelhorn solo (7)
- Larry Williams – horns, horn arrangements and conductor (6, 7, 9)
- Bill Reichenbach Jr. – horns, horn arrangements and conductor (6)
- Larry Hall – horns
- Kim Hutchcroft – horns

=== Production ===
- André Fischer – producer
- Tommy LiPuma – producer
- Al Schmitt – recording, mixing
- Don Henderson – assistant engineer
- Raymond Willhard – assistant engineer
- Mike Reese – mastering at The Mastering Lab (Hollywood, California)
- Noel Newbolt – production coordinator
- Peter Whorf – art direction
- Fred Valentine – photography
