= Burchfield Nines =

Studio album by Michael Franks
- Released: 1978 on vinyl; 1988 on CD
- Studio: House of Music (West Orange, New Jersey); Capitol Studios (Hollywood, California)
- Genre: Jazz
- Length: 37:21
- Label: Warner Bros.
- Producer: Tommy LiPuma

Michael Franks chronology
Sleeping Gypsy (1977)	Burchfield Nines (1978)	Tiger in the Rain (1979)

Burchfield Nines is a jazz vocal album by Michael Franks, released in 1978 by Warner Bros. Records.

== Track listing ==
All tracks are written by Michael Franks.

Side one
No.	Title	Length
1.	"When the Cookie Jar Is Empty"	5:11
2.	"A Robinsong"	3:49
3.	"Wrestle a Live Nude Girl"	4:35
4.	"Burchfield Nines"	4:40

Side two
No.	Title	Length
1.	"Meet Me in the Deerpark"	6:02
2.	"Dear Little Nightingale"	5:02
3.	"In Search of the Perfect Shampoo"	4:06
4.	"Vivaldi's Song"	4:12

== Reception ==
Professional ratings
Review scores
Source	Rating
AllMusic	3.5/5 stars
The Rolling Stone Jazz Record Guide	3/5 stars

Gene DellaSala of Audioholics.com praised the vinyl record to CD transfer, stating, "the sound quality of this CD is amazing, especially for its time frame."

== Personnel ==
=== Musicians ===
- Michael Franks – vocals, acoustic guitar (8)
- Leon Pendarvis – acoustic piano (1–7)
- John Tropea – guitars (1–7), acoustic lead guitar (8)
- Will Lee – bass guitar (1–7)
- Chuck Domanico – bass guitar (8)
- Steve Gadd – drums (1–7)
- Ralph MacDonald – percussion
- Ernie Watts – tenor saxophone (2, 5)
- Bud Shank – flute solo (8)
- Oscar Brashear – trumpet (4)
- Edgar Lustgarten – cello solo (8)
- Eumir Deodato – orchestra arrangements and conductor
- Frank DeCaro – orchestra contractor
- Israel Baker – concertmaster

=== Production ===
- Tommy LiPuma – producer
- Al Schmitt – recording, mixing
- Jeffery Kawalek – recording
- Mike Reese – mastering at The Mastering Lab (Hollywood, California)
- Noel Newbolt – production coordinator
- John Cabalka – art direction
- Brad Kanawyer – design
- Jean Paglioso – photography
