= Sleeping Gypsy (album) =

1977 studio album by Michael Franks

Studio album by Michael Franks
- Released: 22 January 1977 on vinyl; 1990 on CD
- Studios: Capitol Studios (Hollywood, California)
- Genre: Smooth jazz
- Length: 38:49
- Label: Warner Bros.
- Producer: Tommy LiPuma

Michael Franks chronology
The Art of Tea (1976)	Sleeping Gypsy (1977)	Burchfield Nines (1978)

Professional ratings
Review scores
Source	Rating
AllMusic	4/5 stars
Christgau's Record Guide	B
The Rolling Stone Jazz Record Guide	3/5 stars

Sleeping Gypsy is a jazz vocal album by Michael Franks, released in 1977 with Warner Bros. Records. It was Franks' third studio album after The Art of Tea and prior to Burchfield Nines.

== Track listing ==
All tracks are written by Michael Franks, unless otherwise stated.

Side one
No.	Title	Length
1.	"The Lady Wants to Know"	4:45
2.	"I Really Hope It's You"	4:54
3.	"In the Eye of the Storm"	5:55
4.	"B'wana-He No Home"	4:57

Side two
No.	Title	Writer(s)	Length
1.	"Don't Be Blue"	Michael Franks, John Guerin	3:28
2.	"Antonio's Song (The Rainbow)"		5:03
3.	"Chain Reaction"	Michael Franks, Joe Sample	5:14
4.	"Down in Brazil"		4:33

== Personnel ==
=== Musicians ===
- Michael Franks – vocals
- Joe Sample – acoustic piano (1–3), acoustic piano solo (5–7)
- João Donato – acoustic piano solo (4, 8)
- Larry Carlton – guitars (1–7), lead guitar solo (8)
- Hélio Delmiro – rhythm guitar (4, 8)
- Wilton Felder – bass
- John Guerin – drums (1–3, 5–7)
- João Palma – drums (4, 8)
- Larry Bunker – percussion
- Ray Armando – percussion (1, 3, 4, 6, 8)
- Michael Brecker – tenor sax solo (1, 2, 4)
- David Sanborn – alto sax solo (3, 5–7)
- Claus Ogerman – strings arrangements and conductor
- Israel Baker – concertmaster

=== Production ===
- Tommy LiPuma – producer
- Al Schmitt – recording, mixing
- Don Henderson – assistant engineer
- Noel Newbolt – production assistant
- Glen Christensen – art direction, design
- Michael Bryan – illustrations
- Linda Levine – photography
