= The Art of Tea =

Studio album by Michael Franks
- Released: 1975
- Recorded: May 22 – June 9, 1975
- Studio: Capitol Studios (Hollywood, California)
- Genre: Jazz
- Length: 35:03
- Label: Reprise
- Producer: Tommy LiPuma

Michael Franks chronology
Michael Franks (1973)	The Art of Tea (1975)	Sleeping Gypsy (1977)

Singles from The Art of Tea
- 1. "Popsicle Toes" Released: 1975

Professional ratings
Review scores
Source	Rating
AllMusic	4.5/5 stars
The Rolling Stone Jazz Record Guide	3/5 stars

The Art of Tea is a jazz vocal album by Michael Franks, his first on the Reprise label, released in 1975.

The album peaked at #131 on the Billboard 200. Franks' only Billboard Hot 100 single, "Popsicle Toes", which peaked at #43, is a track on the album.

== Track listing ==
All tracks are written by Michael Franks, unless otherwise noted.

Side one
No.	Title	Writer(s)	Length
1.	"Nightmoves"	Michael Franks, Michael Small	4:03
2.	"Eggplant"		3:34
3.	"Monkey See—Monkey Do"		3:33
4.	"St. Elmo's Fire"		3:58
5.	"I Don't Know Why I'm So Happy I'm Sad"		4:16

Side two
No.	Title	Length
1.	"Jive"	3:16
2.	"Popsicle Toes"	4:35
3.	"Sometimes I Just Forget To Smile"	3:45
4.	"Mr. Blue"	4:03

== Personnel ==
- Michael Franks – vocals
- Joe Sample – keyboards
- Larry Carlton – guitars
- Wilton Felder – bass
- John Guerin – drums, percussion
- Steve Gadd - drums
- Jerry Steinholtz – congas
- Larry Bunker – vibraphone
- David Sanborn – alto saxophone (3, 9)
- Michael Brecker – tenor saxophone (6)
- Nick DeCaro – string arrangements

=== Production ===
- Tommy LiPuma – producer
- Al Schmitt – recording, mixing
- Bruce Botnick – recording
- Lee Herschberg – recording
- Doug Sax – mastering at The Mastering Lab (Hollywood, California)
- Ed Thrasher – art direction
- Linda Levine – photography

== Charts ==
Chart (1976)	Peak position
US Billboard 200	131

== Certifications ==
Region	Certification	Certified units/sales
Australia (ARIA)	Gold	35,000^{^}
^{^} Shipments figures based on certification alone.

== Bibliography ==
- The Art of Tea (Vinyl back cover). United States: Reprise. 1975. MS2230.
