= Maxine Nightingale discography =

- Studio albums: 6
- Compilation albums: 1
- Singles: 19

This is the discography of British singer Maxine Nightingale.

== Albums ==
=== Studio albums ===
Title	Album details	Peak chart positions				
Title	Album details	AUS	CAN	SWE	US	US R&B
Right Back Where We Started From	Released: May 1976; Label: United Artists; Formats: LP, MC, 8-track	25	59	47	65	38
Night Life	Released: July 1977; Label: United Artists; Formats: LP, MC	86	—	—	—	—
Love Lines	Released: August 1978; Label: United Artists; Formats: LP, MC; Released in the US and Canada as Lead Me On in June 1979 with a different track listing	—	—	—	45	35
Bittersweet	Released: October 1980; Label: RCA Victor, Liberty; Formats: LP, MC	—	—	—	—	—
It's a Beautiful Thing	Released: November 1982; Label: Highrise Entertainment; Formats: LP, MC; US-only release	—	—	—	176	35
Cry for Love	Released: 1986; Label: Mercury; Formats: LP; France-only release	—	—	—	—	—
"—" denotes releases that did not chart or were not released in that territory.

=== Compilation albums ===
Title	Album details
The Best of Maxine Nightingale – Right Back Where We Started From	Released: 1995; Label: United Artists/Liberty; Formats: CD; Australia-only release

== Singles ==
Title	Year	Peak chart positions										Album
Title	Year	UK	AUS	CAN	IRE	NL	NZ	SWE	US	US AC	US R&B	Album
"Talk to Me"	1969	—	—	—	—	—	—	—	—	—	—	Non-album single
"Don't Push Me Baby"	1969	—	—	—	—	—	—	—	—	—	—	Non-album single
"Love on Borrowed Time"	1971	—	—	—	—	—	—	—	—	—	—	Non-album single
"Right Back Where We Started From"	1975	8	4	12	14	3	6	9	2	5	46	Right Back Where We Started From
"Gotta Be the One"	1976	—	12	—	—	—	19	—	53	22	—	Right Back Where We Started From
"Think I Want to Possess You"	1976	—	—	—	—	—	—	—	—	—	—	Right Back Where We Started From
"Love Hit Me"	1977	11	30	—	—	—	—	—	—	—	—	Night Life
"I Wonder Who's Waiting Up for You Tonight" (Japan-only release)	1977	—	—	—	—	—	—	—	—	—	—	Night Life
"Will You Be My Lover"	1977	—	—	—	—	—	—	—	—	—	—	Night Life
"Didn't I (Blow Your Mind This Time)"	1977	—	—	—	—	—	—	—	—	—	—	Night Life
"(Bringing Out) The Girl in Me"	1978	—	58	—	—	—	—	—	73	—	—	Love Lines
"Lead Me On"	1978	—	—	2	—	—	8	—	5	1	37	Love Lines
"You Got to Me"	1978	—	—	—	—	—	—	—	—	—	—	Love Lines
"Take Your Heart"	1980	—	—	—	—	—	—	—	—	—	—	Bittersweet
"All Night with Me"	1980	—	—	—	—	—	—	—	—	—	—	Bittersweet
"Work on It"	1980	—	—	—	—	—	—	—	—	—	—	Bittersweet
"Rendezvous" (with Brian Short; US-only release)	1981	—	—	—	—	—	—	—	—	—	—	Non-album single
"Turn to Me" (featuring Jimmy Ruffin; US-only release)	1982	—	—	—	—	—	—	—	—	—	17	It's a Beautiful Thing
"My Heart Knows" (France-only release)	1985	—	—	—	—	—	—	—	—	—	—	Cry for Love
"—" denotes releases that did not chart or were not released in that territory.
