= List of Billboard Adult Contemporary number ones of 1979 =

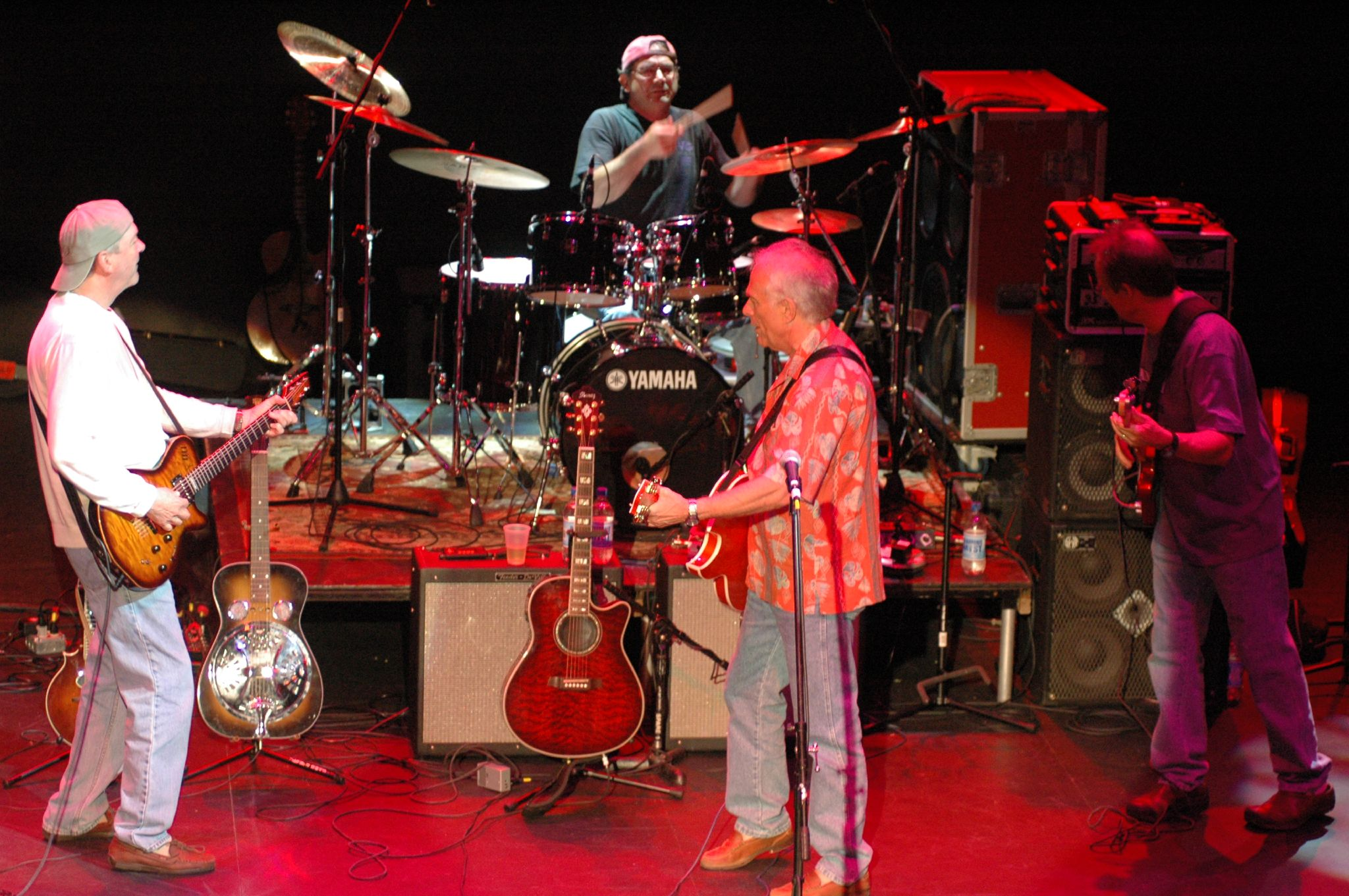
The band Poco, pictured performing in 2007, topped the chart with "Crazy Love" in 1979.

In 1979, Billboard magazine published a chart ranking the top-performing songs in the United States in the easy listening or adult contemporary music (AC) market. The chart was entitled Easy Listening through the issue dated March 31 and Adult Contemporary thereafter. It has undergone further name changes but has again been published under the title Adult Contemporary since 1996. In 1979, 19 songs topped the chart based on playlists submitted by radio stations.

On the first chart of the year, the Scottish singer Al Stewart held the top spot with "Time Passages", which was in its ninth week at number one. The song ended its run at the top after ten weeks, the longest unbroken spell at number one on the chart for more than ten years. Stewart had been a recording artist since the mid-1960s and continued to be active into the 21st century, but his U.S. chart success was confined to a four-year period at the end of the 1970s. The Canadian singer Anne Murray was the only act with more than one Easy Listening/AC number one in 1979. One of Canada's biggest musical exports of the 1970s, Murray topped the U.S. country and Easy Listening/AC charts, as well as Billboard's pop listing, the Hot 100, during the decade. In 1979 she topped the Easy Listening/AC chart with "I Just Fall in Love Again" in February and March, "Shadows in the Moonlight" in June, and "Broken Hearted Me" in October and November, and spent a total of 13 weeks in the top spot.

The country rock band Poco had the longest unbroken run at number one during the year, spending seven consecutive weeks in the top spot with "Crazy Love". The song was eventually knocked from the top of the chart in the issue of Billboard dated April 28 by "I Never Said I Love You" by Orsa Lia. One of the most obscure acts to top the chart, Lia never placed any other songs on either the AC or pop charts, and there is no record of her having released another album after her self-titled 1979 debut. Other acts who gained their only AC number ones in 1979 included the British singer Maxine Nightingale, who had three separate runs in the top spot with "Lead Me On", and JD Souther, who had a five-week run at number one with "You're Only Lonely". Souther experienced a brief period of chart success in his own right, but was much better known as a songwriter for other artists, most notably the Eagles. Only one AC number one of 1979 also topped the Hot 100: the trumpeter Herb Alpert reached the top spot on both charts with his instrumental "Rise". The final AC number one of the year was "Send One Your Love" by Stevie Wonder.

== Chart history ==
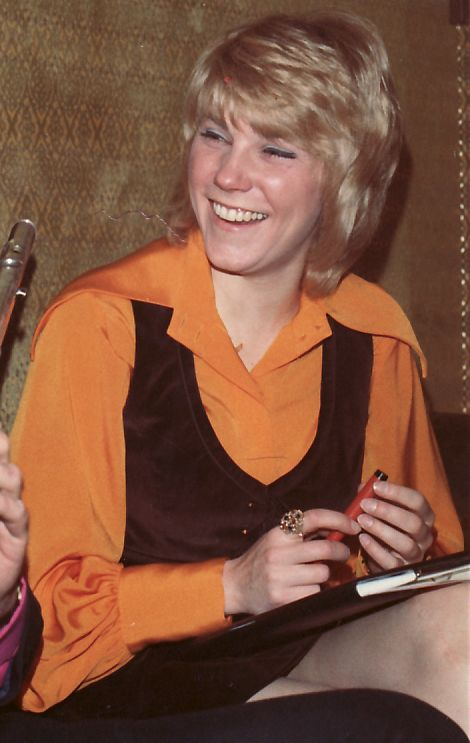
The Canadian singer Anne Murray was the only act with more than one number one in 1979.

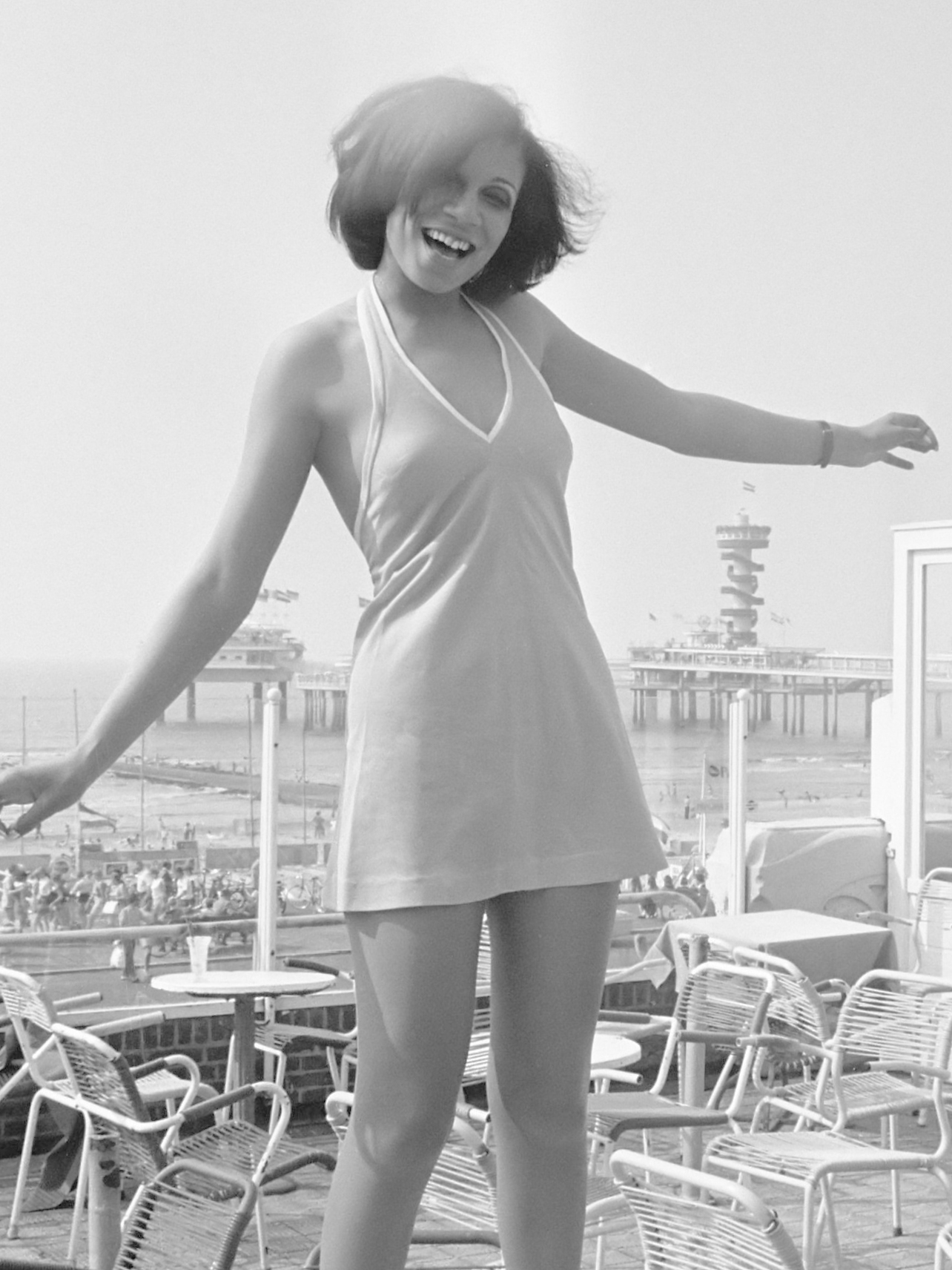
The British vocalist Maxine Nightingale (pictured in 1969) had three separate spells at number one with "Lead Me On".

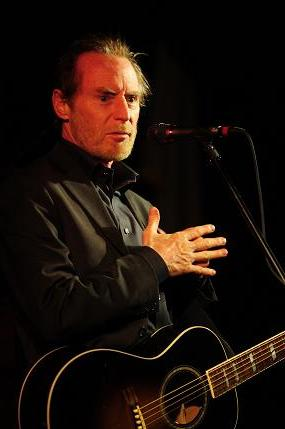
"You're Only Lonely" was the only chart-topper for JD Souther (pictured in 2008).

Chart history
Issue date	Title	Artist(s)	Ref.
January 6	"Time Passages"	Al Stewart	
January 13	"Time Passages"	Al Stewart	
January 20	"This Moment in Time"	Engelbert Humperdinck	
January 27	"This Moment in Time"	Engelbert Humperdinck	
February 3	"Lotta Love"	Nicolette Larson	
February 10	"I Just Fall in Love Again"	Anne Murray	
February 17	"I Just Fall in Love Again"	Anne Murray	
February 24	"I Just Fall in Love Again"	Anne Murray	
March 3	"I Just Fall in Love Again"	Anne Murray	
March 10	"Crazy Love"	Poco	
March 17	"Crazy Love"	Poco	
March 24	"Crazy Love"	Poco	
March 31	"Crazy Love"	Poco	
April 7	"Crazy Love"	Poco	
April 14	"Crazy Love"	Poco	
April 21	"Crazy Love"	Poco	
April 28	"I Never Said I Love You"	Orsa Lia	
May 5	"Love Is the Answer"	England Dan & John Ford Coley	
May 12	"Love Is the Answer"	England Dan & John Ford Coley	
May 19	"Just When I Needed You Most"	Randy VanWarmer	
May 26	"She Believes in Me"	Kenny Rogers	
June 2	"Just When I Needed You Most"	Randy VanWarmer	
June 9	"She Believes in Me"	Kenny Rogers	
June 16	"Shadows in the Moonlight"	Anne Murray	
June 23	"Shadows in the Moonlight"	Anne Murray	
June 30	"Shadows in the Moonlight"	Anne Murray	
July 7	"Lead Me On"	Maxine Nightingale	
July 14	"Lead Me On"	Maxine Nightingale	
July 21	"Lead Me On"	Maxine Nightingale	
July 28	"Morning Dance"	Spyro Gyra	
August 4	"Lead Me On"	Maxine Nightingale	
August 11	"Lead Me On"	Maxine Nightingale	
August 18	"Lead Me On"	Maxine Nightingale	
August 25	"Mama Can't Buy You Love"	Elton John	
September 1	"Lead Me On"	Maxine Nightingale	
September 8	"Different Worlds"	Maureen McGovern	
September 15	"Different Worlds"	Maureen McGovern	
September 22	"Rise"	Herb Alpert	
September 29	"Where Were You When I Was Falling in Love"	Lobo	
October 6	"Where Were You When I Was Falling in Love"	Lobo	
October 13	"Broken Hearted Me"	Anne Murray	
October 20	"Broken Hearted Me"	Anne Murray	
October 27	"Broken Hearted Me"	Anne Murray	
November 3	"Broken Hearted Me"	Anne Murray	
November 10	"Broken Hearted Me"	Anne Murray	
November 17	"You're Only Lonely"	JD Souther	
November 24	"You're Only Lonely"	JD Souther	
December 1	"You're Only Lonely"	JD Souther	
December 8	"You're Only Lonely"	JD Souther	
December 15	"You're Only Lonely"	JD Souther	
December 22	"Send One Your Love"	Stevie Wonder	
December 29	"Send One Your Love"	Stevie Wonder	

== See also ==
- 1979 in music
- List of artists who reached number one on the U.S. Adult Contemporary chart
