= Right Back Where We Started From (album) =

Studio album by Maxine Nightingale
- Released: June 1976
- Recorded: 1975–March 1976
- Studio: Central Sound Studios, Eden Studios, Island Studios, Morgan Studios and Olympic Studios (London, UK)
- Genre: R&B, soul
- Length: 44:25
- Label: United Artists
- Producer: Pierre Tubbs

Maxine Nightingale chronology
Right Back Where We Started From (1976)	Night Life (also known as Love Hit Me) (1977)

Right Back Where We Started From is the debut album by British R&B and soul music singer Maxine Nightingale, recorded and released in 1976 by United Artists.

== Background and recording ==
The title track was released as a single in the summer of 1975 reaching No. 8 in the UK: subsequent to its year-end US release the track would reach #5 in Adult Contemporary, #9 in Dance Music/Club Play, #46 in R&B singles and #2 on the Billboard Hot 100. Nightingale, spending time with her husband in Japan at the time her single gained popularity, ignored advisements from United Artists that she return to London to cut an album, accepting that advice only as the single moved up the upper half of the Billboard Hot 100 in March 1976.

The initial recording of the "Right Back Where We Started From" single had been in a session at Central Sound, a small demo studio on Denmark Street in Camden: the basic track had then been augmented at London studios Olympic Sound, Morgan Studios, and Basing Street Studios. The tracks to complete the Right Back Where We Started From album were recorded at Eden Studios in Chiswick. Nightingale stated, "The...album had to be completed in two weeks–they wanted to rush release it in America. I chose all the songs but I would have made a few production changes had I been there all the time."

== Critical reception ==
Released in June 1976 – concurrent with the single "Gotta Be the One" – the Right Back Where We Started From album drew little evident critical notice. Dave Marsh of Rolling Stone in his syndicated capsule review column, while praising the title cut as "one of the most engaging singles of the current Top 40", opined that the album overall "fumbles through mild, unexciting ballads (a little like those Natalie Cole does so well) and the [expected] listless disco forays. Lynn Short of the Morristown Daily Record agreed: "'Right Back Where We Started From' is definitely a cut above the average Top 40 song. Unfortunately it's also a cut above...the rest of the album [which consists of] uninspired upbeat tunes ('I Think I Wanna Possess You') and semi-ballads which range from not bad ('Reasons') to definitely bad ('Life Has Just Begun'). It's fairly clear this is an album that was quickly assembled to cash in on a hit single."

The single "Gotta Be the One" would prove to be a Top 40 shortfall peaking at No. 53 on the Billboard Hot 100 (and faring less well in the other US music trade magazines: the Cashbox singles chart afforded "Gotta Be the One" a No. 84 peak while the track failed to reach the top 100 Singles Chart in Record World peaking at No. 102 on the Singles Chart 101–150. Another album track: "(I Think I Wanna) Possess You", had an unsuccessful single release in September 1976. Without the momentum of a current major hit single, the Right Back Where We Started From album rose no higher than #65 on the Billboard album charts. Nightingale herself would later state (in 1979) that the Right Back Where We Started From album (Maxine Nightingale quote:)"came out too long after the [title] single and [therefore] was unsuccessful." It should also be noted that the title track, "Right Back Where We Started From", was used throughout the 1977 hockey classic, "SlapShot", starring Paul Newman.

== Track listing ==
Side 1

1. "(I Think I Wanna) Possess You" (Tim Moore) – 3:29
2. "Bless You" (John Lennon) – 4:30
3. "Right Back Where We Started From" (Pierre Tubbs, Vince Edwards) – 3:11
4. "In Love We Grow" (Dennis Belfield) – 3:35 (Timed @ 2:39 on LP)
5. "Gotta Be the One" (Pierre Tubbs) – 2:50
6. "One Last Ride" (Pierre Tubbs) – 2:33
7. "Reasons" (Maurice White, Charles Stepney, Philip Bailey) – 4:23

Side 2

1. "If I Ever Lose This Heaven" (Leon Ware, Pam Sawyer) – 3:59
2. "Love Enough" (Tim Moore) – 3:35
3. "You Got the Love" (Chaka Khan, Ray Parker Jr.) – 4:35
4. "Life Has Just Begun" (Glenn Nightingale) – 3:38
5. "Everytime I See a Butterfly" (Tiny Barge) – 3:37
6. "Good-Bye Again" (Pierre Tubbs, Vince Edwards) – 3:27

== Charts ==
Chart (1976)	Peak position
Australia (Kent Music Report)	25

== Personnel ==
- Maxine Nightingale – vocals, backing vocals (3, 7, 8, 10)
- Lynton Naiff – acoustic piano (1, 4, 7, 9, 13), Fender Rhodes (2, 6, 8, 11, 12), clavinet (6), marimba (7), Mellotron (11)
- Bob Andrews – clavinet (1, 10), Roland synthesizer (2), acoustic piano (5), Rhodes electric piano (5), percussion (5), vocals (5)
- Pierre Tubbs – Elka synthesizer (3, 5), guitars (3, 5), percussion (3, 5-8, 12), backing vocals (3), retzina (5), vocals (5)
- Mick Barker – guitars (1, 2, 6, 8, 10), Spanish guitar (7), acoustic guitar (9, 11, 12), electric guitar (13)
- Glenn Nightingale – guitars (1, 2, 6, 8, 10), electric guitar (7, 9, 11), cabasa (11), acoustic guitar (12)
- Mike de Albuquerque – bass (1–3, 5–9, 11–13), electric bass (10), processed bass (10)
- Theo Thunder – drums (1, 2, 5, 6, 11–13)
- Pete Kershaw – drums (3), backing vocals (3)
- Jeff Seopardie – drums (8, 9)
- Dave Ulm – percussion (1, 7, 8, 10, 12), congas (2, 6, 11), bongos (6), tambourine (9)
- Frank Ricotti – vibraphone (2, 13)
- J. Vince Edwards – percussion (3, 5), backing vocals (3), vocals (5)
- Ronji Southern – percussion (5), vocals (5)
- Bernado Ball – timbales (6, 11)
- Ian Harrison – percussion (7, 12)
- Tony Wolbrom – piranas (11)
- Peter Hughes – baritone saxophone (3)
- Kenny Wheeler – flugelhorn (6), trumpet solo (12)
- Raphael Ravenscroft – brass arrangements (1, 6, 8, 10), baritone saxophone (5), flute arrangements (7), sax solo (8), flute (11), saxophone (11)
- Bill Skeat – brass arrangements (1, 6, 7, 8, 10), flute arrangements (7)
- Gerry Shury – string arrangements and conductor (2, 4, 7, 9, 12, 13)
- Wilf Gibson – string arrangements and conductor (3, 5)
- Julien Galliard – string leader (2, 4, 7, 9, 12, 13)
- Ken Gold – backing vocals (1, 6, 7)
- John Perry – backing vocals (1, 6, 7)
- Tony Rivers – backing vocals (1, 6, 7)
- Al Matthews – backing vocals (3)
- Helen Chappell – backing vocals (10)
- Liza Strike – backing vocals (10)

== Production ==
- Pierre Tubbs – producer, album cover concept
- Lynton Naiff – rhythm track disorganization
- Mike Gardner – engineer
- Roger Béchirian – assistant engineer
- Derek Richards – album cover concept, photography
- Dave Murphy – art direction
- Bob Searles – design
- Keith Morris – inert photography
- Lyn Banks – stylist
