= Star Turn on 45 (Pints) =

English novelty song musical ensemble

- Origin: North East England
- Genres: Pop, novelty song, comedy
- Years active: 1981–present
- Labels: V Tone Records, Turn Trax, Pacific Records, BMG Records
- Members: Colin Horton Jennings; J. Vincent Edwards
- Past members: Steve O'Donnell (deceased)

Star Turn on 45 (Pints) is an English novelty song musical ensemble, originally with Steve O'Donnell, Colin Horton Jennings and J. Vincent Edwards. They have recorded a number of singles since 1981, five of which appeared in the UK singles chart, and released two albums.

== Background ==
In the fictional Whitley Bay social club, Hampton Cummings performs as "Star Turn", a club singer, introduced by Geordie concert chairman Albert Charlton who frequently interrupts with announcements and who sometimes joins in the performance, by playing the spoons or providing a spoken word accompaniment.

Charlton is played by J. Vincent Edwards, who had previously appeared in the London performance of Hair, had a brief career as a solo singer in the late 1960s and early 1970s, and then moved into songwriting and production, and was a co-writer of "Right Back Where We Started From", a UK No. 8 hit, and US No. 2, for Maxine Nightingale. Edwards' experiences of performing at affiliated working men's clubs in North East England, early in his career, was part of the inspiration for Star Turn.

Cummings is played by Colin Horton Jennings, who had sung and performed with the groups The Greatest Show on Earth and Taggett, and who composed songs for, amongst others, The Hollies, Cilla Black and the Salsoul Orchestra. In 2012, Jennings and the backing musicians from Star Turn formed a group called 'The Ilsleys'.

== Career ==
Star Turn's debut single was "Are You Affiliated?" (1981), followed by "Starturn on 45 (Pints)" in October that year, a parody of the Stars on 45 singles, a medley of various pop standards with a non-stop disco beat. Both were released by V Tone Records. Jennings' performance exaggerated the "club singer" style, while the concert chairman urged the audience to "settle down; give the lad a chance now, he's only doing his best".

In 1984, their album, Are You Affiliated? was released on the Turn Trax record label. It contained parodies of songs such as "Send in the Clowns", "House of the Rising Sun", "Mary's Boy Child" and "White Christmas".

Their biggest commercial success occurred in 1988, when "Pump Up the Bitter", climbed to No. 12 in the UK Singles Chart. It parodied sample-laden tracks of the era, such as Bomb The Bass's "Beat Dis" and M/A/R/R/S's "Pump Up the Volume", which had been a No. 1 hit single in the UK the previous year. The success of "Pump Up the Bitter" gave Star Turn on 45 (Pints) an appearance on BBC Television's Top of the Pops. Various subsequent releases were not big sellers.

Steve O'Donnell died on 4 August 1997.

The group went on to cover (amongst other songs) Franz Ferdinand's 2004 hit, "Take Me Out". In addition they released a medley to coincide with the Royal Wedding in 2011, downloadable with all their back catalogue from iTunes.

== Discography ==
=== Albums ===
| Year | Album | UK |
|---|---|---|
| 1984 | Are You Affiliated? | – |
| 1996 | Maybe Definitely the Best Turn Album in the World ... Ever Ever!! | – |

=== Singles ===
| Year | Song | UK | Parody or theme |
|---|---|---|---|
| 1981 | "Are You Affiliated?" | – | Working men's clubs |
| 1981 | "Starturn on 45 (Pints)" | 45 | Stars on 45 |
| 1988 | "Pump Up the Bitter" | 12 | "Pump Up the Volume" |
| 1988 | "Lock Stock and Barrel" | 97 | Stock Aitken Waterman |
| 1988 | "Christmas Party" | 88 | Acid house |
| 1991 | "Hoakey Karioke" | – | Working men's clubs |
| 1993 | "I Will Always Love You" | – | Whitley Houston |
| 1995 | "Parklife"/"Roll With It" | – | The Blurs vs the Oasises |
| 1995 | "I Believe"/"Up on the Roof" | 98 | Robson and Jerome |
| 2004 | "Take Me Out" | – | Franz Ferdinand |
| 2011 | "Wedding Favourites" | – | The Royal Wedding |
"–" denotes releases that did not chart.
