= Lead Me On =

Lead Me On may refer to:

== Albums ==
- Lead Me On (Amy Grant album) or the title song (see below), 1988
- Lead Me On (Conway Twitty and Loretta Lynn album) or the title song (see below), 1972
- Lead Me On (Kelly Joe Phelps album) or the title song, 1994
- Lead Me On (Maxine Nightingale album) or the title song (see below), 1978

== Songs ==
- "Lead Me On" (Amy Grant song), 1988
- "Lead Me On" (Conway Twitty and Loretta Lynn song), 1971
- "Lead Me On" (Maxine Nightingale song), 1979
- "Lead Me On", by Louise from Heavy Love, 2020
- "Lead Me On", by Steve and Eydie, 1971
- "Lead Me On", by Teena Marie from the Top Gun film soundtrack, 1986

== See also ==
- "Leading Me On", a song by Monrose from Strictly Physical
