= Vincent Edwards (disambiguation) =

Vincent Edwards, Vincent Edward or Vince Edwards may refer to the following:

- Vince Edwards (1928–1996), American actor, director, and singer
- Vincent Edwards (basketball) (born 1996), American basketball player
- J. Vincent Edwards (born 1947), British singer

== See also ==
- Vincent Edward "Bo" Jackson
- Vincent Edward Scully
