= Bob Holz =

American drummer and composer (born 1958)

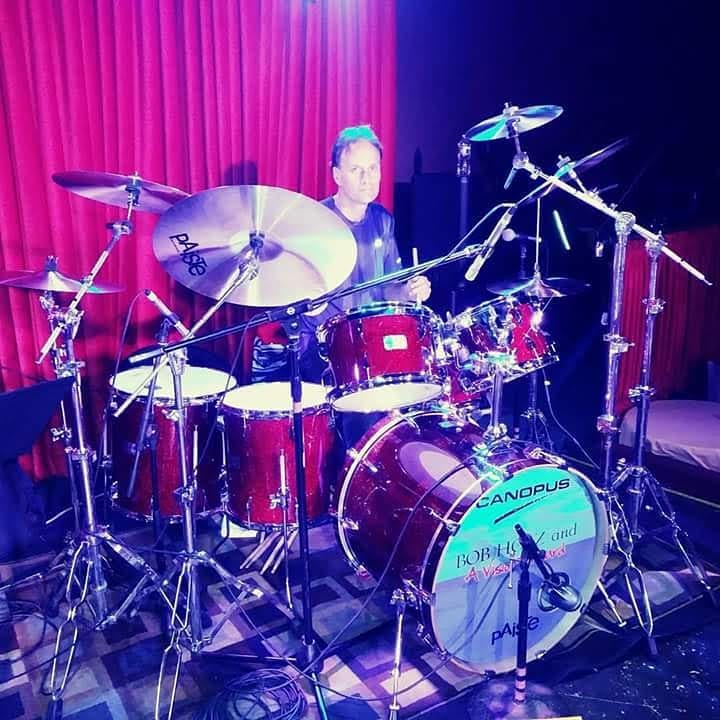
- Bob Holz performing in 2018.

Background information
- Born: Robert Avel Holz; February 3, 1958 (age 68); Syracuse, New York, U.S.
- Genres: Jazz, post bop, jazz fusion
- Occupations: Musician, songwriter, bandleader
- Instruments: Drums, percussion, vocals
- Years active: 1970– present
- Labels: MVD Entertainment Group, MVD Audio
- Website: www.bobholzband.com

Robert Avel Holz (born February 3, 1958) is an American drummer and composer. Holz was born in Syracuse, New York and resides in Los Angeles, California. He played with jazz guitarist Larry Coryell's trio between 2015 and 2017 appearing at major venues such as Blues Alley in Washington, D.C.; and, has led his own groups: Bob Holz and A Vision Forward, and Bob Holz Band.

== Biography ==
Holz started his jazz career composing and performing in Boston attending the Berklee College of Music, the largest independent college of contemporary American music and jazz worldwide. He then went on to apprentice with Jazz Hall of Fame drummers Billy Cobham and Dave Weckl.

Bob has accompanied a number of high-profile artists on drums in both jazz and crossover genre including: Robben Ford, Les McCann, Cornell Dupree, James Cotton, Peter Tosh, The Outlaws, Mountain, Noel Redding, Foghat, Molly Hatchet, Head East, Savoy Brown, Wolfman Jack, The Winters Brothers, Blackfoot, Shemika Copeland, Johnny Winter, Eddie Money, Maria Muldaur, Dr. John, The Grass Roots, Three Dog Night, Blue Oyster Cult, Elvin Bishop, Duke Robillard, Renee Austin, Marcia Ball, Sue Foley, Otis Rush, Pinetop Perkins, Commander Cody, Point Blank, Grinderswitch, Stillwater, Bobby Kimball of Toto, Orleans, Brian Howe of Bad Company and George Clinton/ Parliament Funk.

Focusing on Jazz Fusion, Holz has developed a formidable resume of live and studio recordings with a host of luminaries including Larry Coryell, John McLaughlin, Jean-Luc Ponty, Ralphe Armstrong, Mike Stern, Randy Brecker, and David "Fathead" Newman. Traveling as a band leader (Bob Holz and A Vision Forward) he has released six albums developing his own style of jazz fusion and post bop jazz.

The first album, Higher than the Clouds was released in 2012 featuring songs written by Bob Holz, Fran and Frank Stephanek. Bob Holz can be heard on vocals, drums and percussion. Frank Stepanek is featured on guitars, bass, keyboards and percussion as well as the vocal on "She Can Go Free".

Visions and Friends, the second album by MVD Audio, was recorded in Los Angeles in 2016 and released in 2017. The eleven tracks featured compositions from Holz, Coryell, and keyboardist Billy Steinway. Randy Brecker is featured on trumpet, Alex Machacek on guitar.

The third album for MVD Audio, Visions:Coast To Coast Connection with A Vision Forward was released in 2018 and featured Stanley Clarke, Randy Brecker, Alex Machacek, Ralphe Armstrong, and Chet Catallo.

On February 8, 2019, Holz released the fourth CD Silverthorne with MVD Audio. The album features Holz on drums, guitarist Mike Stern, trumpeter Randy Brecker, bassist Ralphe Armstrong, saxophonist Brandon Fields (musician), guitarist Jamie Glaser, guitarist Alex Machacek, saxophonist Ada Rovatti, bassist Andrew Ford, keyboardist Billy Steinway and percussionist Alex Acuna.

The fifth CD, Live in New York & L.A. also by MVD Audio, was released in 2020 crossing East and West coasts in production over several years. It features musicians Bob Holz, Brandon Fields, Ralphe Armstrong, Mike Miller, Joey de Leon and Chet Catallo.

Bob Holz's album, Holz-Stathis: Collaborative for MVD Audio, was released in September 2023. Alumni of the Mahavishnu Orchestra: John McLaughlin, Jean-Luc Ponty and Ralphe Armstrong reunited for the first time in decades. Also featured was Latin jazz fusion with percussionists Airto Moreira, Alex Acuña and Joey Heredia.

== Discography ==
Bob Holz and A Vision Forward

- 2016: A Vision Forward (MVD Audio) Bob Holz, Larry Coryell, Mike Stern and Randy Brecker
- 2017: Visions And Friends (MVD Audio) Bob Holz, Larry Coryell and Randy Brecker
- 2018: Visions: Coast To Coast Connection (MVD Audio) Bob Holz, Stanley Clarke and Randy Brecker
- 2019: Silverthorne (MVD Audio) Bob Holz, Mike Stern and Randy Brecker
- 2020: Live in New York and L.A. (MVD Audio) Bob Holz, Brandon Fields, Ralphe Armstrong, Mike Miller, Joey de Leon and Chet Catallo
- 2023: Holz-Stathis: Collaborative (MVD Audio) Bob Holz

Bob Holz Band

- 2012: Higher than the Clouds, (CD Baby) Bob Holz, Frank Stepanek and Fran Stepanek
