= Freetime (album) =

Studio album by Spyro Gyra
- Released: July 1981
- Recorded: 1981
- Studio: Secret Sound (New York City, New York); House of Music (West Orange, New Jersey)
- Genre: Jazz fusion
- Length: 37:33
- Label: MCA
- Producer: Jay Beckenstein; Richard Calandra

Spyro Gyra chronology
Carnaval (1980)	Freetime (1981)	Incognito (1982)

Professional ratings
Review scores
Source	Rating
AllMusic	3/5 stars

Freetime is the fifth album by Spyro Gyra, released in 1981. At Billboard magazine, the album reached No. 41 on the Top 200 albums chart and No. 1 on that magazine's Jazz Albums chart.

== Track listing ==
No.	Title	Writer(s)	Length
1.	"Freetime"	Tom Schuman, Eli Konikoff	6:03
2.	"Telluride"	Jay Beckenstein	5:18
3.	"Summer Strut"	Jeremy Wall	5:07
4.	"Elegy for Trane"	Jeremy Wall	4:35
5.	"Pacific Sunrise"	Tom Schuman	7:53
6.	"Amber Dream"	Jay Beckenstein	5:07
7.	"String Soup"	Jim Kurzdorfer	3:30

== Personnel ==
Spyro Gyra

- Jay Beckenstein – soprano saxophone (1, 2, 4, 5), alto saxophone (2, 3, 6, 7), percussion (1), clay flute (3), tenor saxophone (5)
- Tom Schuman – Fender Rhodes (1–3, 5–7), synthesizers (1, 5, 6), acoustic piano (2, 5)
- Jeremy Wall – polyphonic synthesizer (1, 5), synthesizers (2), acoustic piano (3), additional synthesizers (6)
- John Tropea – guitars (1–3, 5–7), guitar solo (3)
- Chet Catallo – guitars (6, 7), guitar solo (6, 7)
- Eli Konikoff – drums (1–3, 5–7)
- Gerardo Velez – percussion (1–3, 5–7)
- Dave Samuels – vibraphone (2), marimba (3, 5)

Guest musicians

- Rob Mounsey – polyphonic synthesizer (1, 5), synthesizers (2, 3), additional synthesizers (6)
- Richard Tee – acoustic piano (7), Fender Rhodes (7), acoustic piano solo (7)
- Steve Khan – guitars (3)
- Will Lee – bass (1–3, 5–7)
- Errol "Crusher" Bennett – percussion (1–3, 5, 6)
- Richard Calandra – cymbals (4)
- Randy Brecker – trumpet (1)
- David Darling – cello (4)

Horn section

- Jeremy Wall – arrangements and conductor
- Jay Beckenstein – alto saxophone
- Lewis Del Gatto – baritone saxophone
- Michael Brecker – tenor saxophone
- Tom Malone – trombone
- Randy Brecker – trumpet
- Alan Rubin – trumpet

Backing vocals

- Kasey Cisyk
- Will Lee
- Rob Mounsey (also BGV arrangements)
- Valerie Simpson

=== Production ===
- Jay Beckenstein – producer
- Richard Calandra – producer
- Jeremy Wall – assistant producer
- Michael Barry – engineer, mixing
- Steve Baldwin – assistant engineer
- Charles Conrad – mixing
- Julian Robertson – mix assistant
- Bob Ludwig – mastering at Masterdisk (New York, NY)
- David Heffernan – design, photo illustration
