= Carnaval (Spyro Gyra album) =

Studio album by Spyro Gyra
- Released: September 29, 1980
- Recorded: 1980
- Studio: Secret Sound and Power Station (New York City, New York)
- Genre: Jazz, jazz fusion
- Length: 33:02
- Label: MCA
- Producer: Jay Beckenstein; Richard Calandra

Spyro Gyra chronology
Catching the Sun (1980)	Carnaval (1980)	Freetime (1981)

Professional ratings
Review scores
Source	Rating
AllMusic	4/5 stars

Carnaval is the fourth album by Spyro Gyra, released in 1980. It was given gold record status on June 1, 1987.

At Billboard magazine, Carnaval reached No. 49 on the Top 200 Albums chart. The song "Cafe Amore" reached No. 77 on the Hot 100 singles chart and No. 14 on the Adult Contemporary singles chart.

== Track listing ==
1. "Cafe Amore" (Chet Catallo) – 5:02 (album version) 4:12 (single edit version)
2. "Dizzy" (Tom Schuman, Eli Konikoff) – 4:40
3. "Awakening" (Jeremy Wall) – 5:48
4. "Cashaça" (Beckenstein) – 4:18
5. "Foxtrot" (Beckenstein) – 4:40
6. "Sweet and Savvy" (Schuman) – 5:12
7. "Bittersweet" (Beckenstein) – 4:28
8. "Carnaval" (Wall) – 5:26

== Personnel ==
Credits adapted from AllMusic.

Spyro Gyra

- Jay Beckenstein – saxophones, acoustic piano (4)
- Tom Schuman – keyboards (1, 2, 4–7)
- Jeremy Wall – keyboards (3, 8)
- Chet Catallo – guitars (1–7)
- Jim Kurzdorfer – bass (3)
- Eli Konikoff – drums (1–3, 5–7)
- Dave Samuels – marimba (2, 5–8), vibraphone (2, 5–8)
- Gerardo Velez – percussion (2–6, 8)

Guest musicians

- Rob Mounsey – Polyphonic synthesizer (1–7)
- Hiram Bullock – guitars (2, 8), guitar solo (2)
- John Tropea – guitars (3–7), guitar solo (4, 7)
- Will Lee – bass (1, 2, 4–8)
- Steve Jordan – drums (4, 8)
- Errol "Crusher" Bennett – congas (1, 4, 6–8), percussion (1, 4, 6–8)
- Richard Calandra – percussion (3)
- Steve Kroon – percussion (4, 8)
- Michael Brecker – flute (1)
- Randy Brecker – trumpet (1, 2, 5, 8)
- David Darling – cello (2, 3)

Horn Section

- Jay Beckenstein – alto saxophone
- Michael Brecker – tenor saxophone
- Tom Malone – trombone
- Randy Brecker – trumpet

String Section

- Jonathan Abramowitz – cello
- Jesse Levy – cello
- Sanford Allen – violin
- Lamar Alsop – violin
- Peter Dimitriadies – violin
- Harold Kohon – violin
- Harry Lookofsky – violin, concertmaster
- Guy Lumia – violin
- Matthew Raimondi – violin
- Richard Sortomme – violin

=== Production ===
- Jay Beckenstein – producer
- Richard Calandra – producer
- Jeremy Wall – assistant producer, horn and string arrangements (1–5, 7, 8), conductor (1–5, 7, 8)
- Tom Schuman – horn and string arrangements (6), conductor (6)
- Michael Barry – engineer, mixing
- Neil Dorfsman – engineer, mixing
- Jack Malken – engineer, mixing
- Jason Corsaro – assistant engineer
- Chris Howard – assistant engineer
- Lucy Leslie – assistant engineer
- Bob Ludwig – mastering at Masterdisk (New York, NY).
- George Osaki – art direction, design
- David Heffernan – cover artwork
- Waring Abbott – band and sleeve photography
- Eliott Saltzman – studio photography
