= Tom Malone (musician) =

American jazz musician, arranger, and producer (born 1947)

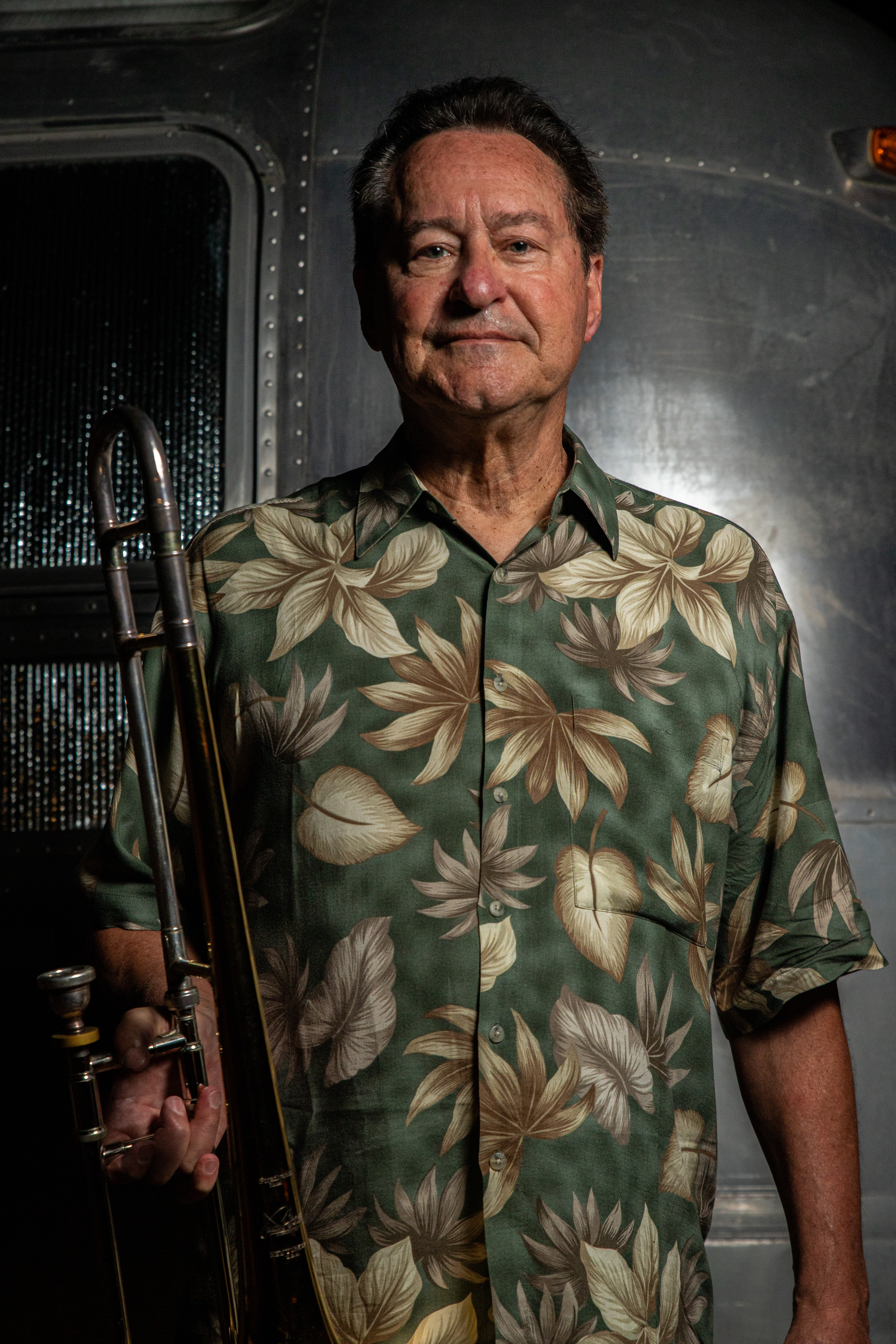
- Malone in 2019

Background information
- Born: Thomas Hugh Malone; June 16, 1947 (age 79); Honolulu, Hawaii, U.S.
- Genres: Jazz; rock; pop
- Occupations: Musician; arranger; record producer
- Instruments: Trombone; saxophone; trumpet; tuba
- Years active: 1969–present
- Formerly of: Blood, Sweat & Tears; The Saturday Night Live Band; The Blues Brothers; CBS Orchestra; Lt. Dan Band

Tom "Bones" Malone (born June 16, 1947) is an American jazz musician, arranger, and producer. As his nickname implies, he specializes on the trombone but he also plays saxophone, trumpet, tuba, flute, and bass guitar. He has been a member of the Blues Brothers, Saturday Night Live Band, Blood, Sweat & Tears, and the CBS Orchestra, the house band for the Late Show with David Letterman.

== Early life ==
Malone was born in Honolulu, Hawaii. His father, Odie Malone, was a U.S. Navy pilot who survived the Japanese attack on Pearl Harbor. Malone graduated from North Texas State University with Lou Marini, who would also become a member of the Blues Brothers band. Both were members of the One O'Clock Lab Band at North Texas.

== Career ==
He began playing professionally as lead trumpeter for Brenda Lee at a club in Jackson, Mississippi while enrolled at the University of Southern Mississippi. In response to a call from Warren Covington, leader of the Tommy Dorsey Orchestra, he began contracting musicians. After transferring to North Texas State University, Malone continued working as both a player and a contractor for groups.

After graduation, Malone worked in bands of Woody Herman (1969), Duke Pearson (1970), Doc Severinsen (1971), Louie Bellson (1972), Frank Zappa (1972), and Blood, Sweat & Tears (1973). In 1973, Malone began a close, fifteen-year association with Gil Evans, whom he has called a mentor. He recorded albums with Evans and toured Europe, Japan, and the Far East. In 1975 Malone toured with Billy Cobham and in 1976 with the Band. He also contributed to the band Blood, Sweat & Tears on their album No Sweat.

After he was heard performing with Ten Wheel Drive and Genya Ravan, he received a call from Saturday Night Live a late-night comedy television program. From 1975 to 1985 he worked as arranger for Saturday Night Live and from 1981 to 1985 as musical director. He wrote the chart for the skit that introduced John Belushi and Dan Aykroyd as the Blues Brothers. He appeared in the movie version and in 1993 reunited with Paul Shaffer, who worked for Saturday Night Live, and Will Lee, who was a member of the CBS Orchestra. Malone was on the Letterman Show from 1993 until 2015 and contributed more than 2,500 arrangements to the Late Show with David Letterman. He worked on the film score for Blues Brothers 2000. As a studio musician, he has been heard on more than 1,500 records, more than 3,500 radio and television commercials, and over 4,500 live television shows. He has played themes for CBS This Morning, Murder, She Wrote, and the 1992 Winter Olympics. His solo album, Soul Bones, includes guest appearances by Paul Shaffer and John Popper of Blues Traveler. Additional film credits include The Last Waltz and Sister Act.

In 2007, Malone was invited by music director Geoffrey Moull to arrange and perform a concert with the Thunder Bay Symphony Orchestra. In 2011, Malone was guest artist with the University of Southern Mississippi Symphony Orchestra.

Malone currently appears with Dan Aykroyd and Jim Belushi Blues Brothers Band and Lou Marini's Original Blues Brothers Band.

== Discography ==
=== As leader ===
- Standards of Living (Big World Music, 1991)

=== As a member ===
Blood, Sweat & Tears

- No Sweat (Columbia, 1973)

With The Blues Brothers

- Briefcase Full of Blues (Atlantic, 1978)
- The Blues Brothers (Atlantic, 1980)
- Made in America (Atlantic, 1981)
- Blues Brothers 2000 (Uptown/Universal, 1999)

=== As a sideman ===
With Gil Evans

- The Gil Evans Orchestra Plays the Music of Jimi Hendrix (RCA, 1974)
- There Comes a Time (RCA, 1976)
- Live at Sweet Basil (King/Electric Bird, 1985)
- Live at Sweet Basil Vol. 2 (King/Electric Bird, 1986)

With Woody Herman

- Heavy Exposure (Cadet, 1969)
- Double Exposure (Chess, 1976)

With Spyro Gyra

- Morning Dance (Infinity, 1979)
- Catching the Sun (MCA, 1980)
- Carnaval (MCA, 1980)
- Freetime (MCA, 1981)

With Frank Zappa

- Zappa in New York (WEA, 1977)
- Leatherette (Lunar Toones, 1978)
- Imaginary Diseases (Zappa, 2006)
- Wazoo (Zappa, 2007)

With others

- Jan Akkerman, Jan Akkerman 3 (Atlantic, 1979)
- Average White Band, Warmer Communications (Atlantic, 1978)
- The Band, Islands (Capitol, 1977)
- The Band, The Last Waltz (Warner Bros., 1978)
- Gato Barbieri, Ruby, Ruby (A&M, 1977)
- Bob Belden, Purple Rain (Somethin' Else, 1994)
- Bob Belden, When Doves Cry (Metro Blue, 1994)
- George Benson, In Your Eyes (Warner Bros., 1983)
- Carla Bley, Night-Glo (Watt, ECM, 1985)
- Hiram Bullock, World of Collision (Big World Music, 1994)
- Hiram Bullock, Try Livin' It (ESC, 2003)
- David Byrne, Rei Momo (Luaka Bop, 1989)
- Ron Carter, Parade (Milestone, 1979)
- Stanley Clarke, Journey to Love (Nemperor, 1975)
- Stanley Clarke, School Days (Epic, 1991)
- Billy Cobham, A Funky Thide of Sings (Atlantic, 1975)
- Willie Colón, The Good, the Bad, the Ugly (Fania, 1975)
- Paulinho da Costa, Happy People (Pablo, 1979)
- Jorge Dalto, Chevere (United Artists, 1976)
- Eumir Deodato, Very Together (MCA, 1976)
- Fania All-Stars, Spanish Fever (Columbia, 1978)
- Robben Ford, The Inside Story (Elektra, 1979)
- Aretha Franklin, Get It Right (Arista, 1983)
- Michael Franks, Tiger in the Rain (Warner Bros., 1979)
- The J. Geils Band, Freeze-Frame (EMI, 1981)
- Levon Helm, Levon Helm & the RCO All-Stars (ABC, 1977)
- Levon Helm, Levon Helm (ABC, 1978)
- Terumasa Hino, Daydream (Flying Disk, 1980)
- Janis Ian, Aftertones (Columbia, 1975)
- James Ingram, Never Felt So Good (Qwest, 1986)
- Joe Jackson, Will Power (A&M, 1987)
- Garland Jeffreys, Guts for Love (Epic, 1982)
- Howard Johnson and Gravity, Gravity!!! (Verve, 1996)
- Chaka Khan, Destiny (Warner Bros., 1986)
- B. B. King, There Must Be a Better World Somewhere (MCA, 1981)
- Al Kooper, Soul of a Man: Al Kooper Live (MusicMasters, 1995)
- Hubert Laws, Say It with Silence (Columbia, 1978)
- Webster Lewis, On the Town (Epic, 1976)
- Ralph MacDonald, Counterpoint (Marlin, 1979)
- Chuck Mangione, Main Squeeze (A&M, 1976)
- Herbie Mann, Astral Island (Atlantic, 1983)
- David Matthews, Dune (CTI, 1977)
- Paul Mauriat, Overseas Call (Philips, 1978)
- Marilyn McCoo & Billy Davis Jr., Marilyn & Billy (Columbia, 1978)
- Van McCoy, My Favorite Fantasy (MCA, 1978)
- Jimmy McGriff, The Mean Machine (Groove Merchant, 1976)
- Carmen McRae, Ms. Magic (Del Rack, 1986)
- Meat Loaf, Dead Ringer (Cleveland/Epic, 1981)
- Pat Metheny, Secret Story (Geffen, 1992)
- Bette Midler, Thighs and Whispers (Atlantic, 1979)
- Barry Miles, Sky Train (RCA Victor, 1977)
- Bob Mintzer, Source (Agharta, 1982)
- Elliott Murphy, Night Lights (RCA Victor, 1976)
- Chico O'Farrill, Latin Roots (Philips, 1976)
- Charlie Palmieri, Con Salsa y Sabor (Cotique, 1977)
- Lou Reed, New Sensations (RCA Victor, 1984)
- Buddy Rich, Speak No Evil (RCA Victor, 1976)
- Vicki Sue Robinson, Never Gonna Let You Go (RCA Victor, 1976)
- Dom Um Romao, Hotmosphere (Pablo, 1976)
- David Sanborn, Taking Off (Warner Bros., 1975)
- David Sanborn, Heart to Heart (Warner Bros., 1990)
- Mongo Santamaria, Afro-Indio (Vaya, 1975)
- Saturday Night Live Band, Live from New York! (ProJazz 1986)
- Saturday Night Live Band, Jupiter (Electric Bird, 1987)
- Paul Shaffer, Coast to Coast (Capitol, 1989)
- Marlena Shaw, Take a Bite (Columbia, 1979)
- Carly Simon, Spy (Elektra, 1979)
- Lonnie Liston Smith, Exotic Mysteries (Columbia, 1978)
- Jeremy Steig, Firefly (CTI, 1977)
- Jim Steinman, Bad for Good (Epic/Cleveland, 1981)
- Joss Stone, Mind Body & Soul (S-Curve, 2004)
- Tina Turner, Love Explosion (United Artists, 1979)
- Stanley Turrentine, The Man with the Sad Face (Fantasy, 1976)
- Bonnie Tyler, Holding Out for a Hero (CBS/Sony, 1984)
- Luther Vandross, Forever, for Always, for Love (Epic, 1982)
- Jeremy Wall, Stepping Into the New World (Amherst, 1992)
- Bruce Willis, If It Don't Kill You It Just Makes You Stronger (Motown, 1989)
- Wing and a Prayer Fife and Drum Corps, Babyface Strikes Back (Wing and a Prayer, 1977)
- Johnny Winter, Step Back (Megaforce, 2014)
- Paul McCartney, Egypt Station (Capitol Records, 2018)
