= Night Life (Maxine Nightingale album) =

Studio album by Maxine Nightingale
- Released: 1977
- Genre: R&B, soul
- Label: United Artists
- Producer: Denny Diante, Pierre Tubbs, Del Newman

Maxine Nightingale chronology
Right Back Where We Started From (1976)	Night Life (1977)	Lead Me On (1978)

Night Life is the second album by British R&B and soul music singer Maxine Nightingale. She is best known for her hits in the 1970s, with the million-seller "Right Back Where We Started From" (1975, U.K. & 1976, U.S.), "Love Hit Me" (Track 3 of this album), and "Lead Me On" (1979).

== Track listing ==
Side One

1. "Will You Be My Lover" (Steve Fields) - 3:00
2. "You Are Everything" (Thom Bell, Linda Creed) - 2:47
3. "Love Hit Me"† (J. Vincent Edwards) - 2:46
4. "You" (Christopher Bond) - 3:50
5. "Get It Up for Love" (Ned Doheny) - 4:07

Side Two

1. "Didn't I (Blow Your Mind This Time)" (William Hart, Thom Bell) - 3:22
2. "Love or Let Me Be Lonely"‡ (Anita Poree, Jerry Peters, Skip Scarborough) - 3:34
3. "I Wonder Who's Waiting Up for You Tonight" (Ed Welch, Graham Dee) - 3:18
4. "How Much Love" (Barry Mann, Leo Sayer) - 3:19
5. "Right Now"¶ (Dennis Belfield) - 4:33
- †Arranged by Jimmie Haskell and Michel Colombier
- ¶Arranged by Larry Carlton - strings arranged by Michel Colombier
- ‡Produced by Pierre Tubbs and Del Newman

== Charts ==
Chart (1977)	Peak position
Australia (Kent Music Report)	86

== Musicians ==
- Larry Carlton - guitar
- Lee Ritenour - guitar
- Ed Greene - drums
- Ron Tutt - drums
- Jim Gordon - drums
- Tom Scott - saxophone
- Larry Muhoberac - keyboards
- Wilton Felder - saxophone
- Anthony Jackson - bass
- Gayle Levant - harp
- Michel Colombier - keyboards
- Jay Graydon - guitar
- Milt Holland - drums
- L. Scretching - various instruments
- Denny Diante - percussion
- The Sid Sharp Strings (James Gadson, Scott Edwards, Marlo Henderson and John Rowan).
- Background vocals - Sigidi, Harold Clayton and David Oliver.

== Production ==
- Remix by Denny Diante and Ron Malo
- Album art direction - Ria Lewerke
- Album design - Bill Burks
- Album photography - Derek Richards
- Recorded at Silvery Moon Studios/Devonshire Sound Studios, North Hollywood, California/Marquee Studio, London.
- Engineers - Ron Malo, James Armstrong and Jerry Hudgins
