= Morning Dance =

- Artwork by David Heffernan

Studio album by Spyro Gyra
- Released: March 9, 1979
- Recorded: 1978
- Studios: Secret Sound (New York City, New York); PCI (Rochester, New York); Trackmaster (Buffalo, New York); House of Music (West Orange, New Jersey)
- Genres: Jazz fusion, smooth jazz
- Length: 39:36
- Labels: Infinity/MCA, Amherst
- Producers: Jay Beckenstein; Richard Calandra

Spyro Gyra chronology
| Spyro Gyra (1978) | Morning Dance (1979) | Catching the Sun (1980) |

Singles from Morning Dance
- 1. "Morning Dance" Released: May 1979

Morning Dance is the second album by the jazz fusion group Spyro Gyra. The album was released in March 9, 1979 and was certified gold by the RIAA on September 19, 1979, and was certified platinum on June 1, 1987.

At Billboard magazine, the album reached No. 27 on the Top 200 albums chart, while the song "Morning Dance" reached No. 24 on the Hot 100 songs chart and No. 1 on the Adult Contemporary songs chart. In Canada, the album reached No. 47 in its 10th week, and returned to No. 49 in its 20th week of 25 in the top 100.

== Critical reception ==
Professional ratings
Review scores
| Source | Rating |
|---|---|
| AllMusic | 3/5 stars |
| The Rolling Stone Album Guide | 2.5/5 stars |

The Globe and Mail wrote that "Morning Dance is too heavily produced and too tightly arranged to be a very impressive jazz record."

== Track listing and personnel ==
1. "Morning Dance" (Jay Beckenstein) – 3:58
  - Jay Beckenstein – alto saxophone
  - Jeremy Wall – electric piano
  - John Tropea – electric and acoustic guitars
  - Jim Kurzdorfer – bass
  - Ted Reinhardt – drums
  - Rubens Bassini – congas and percussion
  - Dave Samuels – marimba and steel drums
2. "Jubilee" (Jeremy Wall) – 4:31
  - Jay Beckenstein – alto saxophone
  - Jeremy Wall – electric piano and synthesizers
  - John Tropea – electric guitar
  - Will Lee – bass
  - Steve Jordan – drums
  - Rubens Bassini – congas and percussion
  - Dave Samuels – marimba
  - Randy Brecker – trumpet solo
3. "Rasul" (Jeremy Wall) – 3:57
  - Jay Beckenstein – soprano and tenor saxophones
  - Jeremy Wall – acoustic and electric pianos
  - Rick Strauss – guitar
  - Jim Kurzdorfer – bass
  - Ted Reinhardt – drums
  - John Clark – French horn
4. "Song for Lorraine" (Jay Beckenstein) – 3:59
  - Jay Beckenstein – soprano saxophone
  - Tom Schuman – electric and acoustic pianos
  - Suzanne Ciani – synthesizers
  - Chet Catallo – guitar
  - Jim Kurzdorfer – bass
  - Eli Konikoff – drums
  - Gerardo Velez – bongos, congas, percussion
  - Lani Groves, Diva Gray and Gordon Grody – vocalists
5. "Starburst" (Jeremy Wall) – 4:50
  - Jay Beckenstein – tenor saxophone (intro)
  - Jeremy Wall – electric piano and synthesizers
  - John Tropea – guitar
  - Will Lee – bass
  - Steve Jordan – drums
  - Rubens Bassini – congas, timbales, percussion
  - Michael Brecker – tenor saxophone solo
6. "Heliopolis" (Jay Beckenstein) – 5:34
  - Jay Beckenstein – alto saxophone, boobams, percussion
  - Jeremy Wall – electric piano and synthesizers
  - Tom Schuman – Rhodes electric piano solo
  - John Tropea – guitar
  - Will Lee – bass
  - Steve Jordan – drums
  - Rubens Bassini – congas, timbales, percussion
  - Dave Samuels – marimba
7. "It Doesn't Matter" (Chet Catallo) – 4:27
  - Jay Beckenstein – soprano saxophone
  - Tom Schuman – electric and acoustic pianos
  - Suzanne Ciani – synthesizer
  - Jeremy Wall – synthesizer
  - Chet Catallo – guitar
  - Jim Kurzdorfer – bass
  - Eli Konikoff – drums
  - Gerardo Velez – congas
  - Lani Groves, Diva Gray and Gordon Gordy – vocalists
8. "Little Linda" (Jeremy Wall) – 4:27
  - Jay Beckenstein – alto saxophone
  - Jeremy Wall – electric piano, acoustic piano, percussion
  - Rick Strauss – guitar
  - Jim Kurzdorfer – bass
  - Ted Reinhardt – drums
  - Rubens Bassini – bongos and percussion
  - Dave Samuels – vibraphone
9. "End of Romanticism" (Rick Strauss) – 5:00
  - Jay Beckenstein – soprano saxophone
  - Jeremy Wall – electric piano
  - Tom Schuman – synthesizer solos
  - Rick Strauss – 6 and 12-string electric guitars
  - Jim Kurzdorfer – bass
  - Ted Reinhardt – drums
  - Dave Samuels – marimba
  - John Clark – French horn

Additional personnel

- Larry Fast – synthesizer programming
- Jeremy Wall – string arrangements and conductor, horn arrangements and conductor (1-5, 7-9)
- Jay Beckenstein – horn arrangements and conductor (6)

Horn section

- Lew Del Gatto – flutes
- Jay Beckenstein – alto saxophone
- Michael Brecker – tenor saxophone
- Tom Malone – trombone
- Randy Brecker – trumpet

Strings

- Charles McCracken – cello
- Alfred Brown – viola
- Harry Cykman – violin
- Charles Libove – violin
- Harry Lookofsky – violin, concertmaster
- Matthew Raimondi – violin

Production

- Jay Beckenstein – producer
- Richard Calandra – producer
- Jeremy Wall – assistant producer
- Michael Barry – recording, mixing
- Jack Malken – recording, mixing
- Charlie Conrad – recording
- Mick Guzauski – recording
- Lawrence Swist – recording
- Jason Corsaro – assistant engineer
- Darroll Gustamachio – assistant engineer
- Candice Munson – assistant engineer
- Rick Rowe – editing
- Bob Ludwig – mastering at Masterdisk (New York, NY)
- Peter Corriston – art direction, design
- Julie Heffernan – illustration

== Charts ==
| Chart (1979) | Peak position |
|---|---|
| Australia (Kent Music Report) | 86 |
| Canada | 27 |
| United States (Billboard 200) | 47 |
