= Catching the Sun (album) =

- Artwork by Peter Corriston

Studio album by Spyro Gyra
- Released: February 1980
- Recorded: 1979
- Studio: Secret Sound Studios, New York
- Genre: Jazz, jazz fusion
- Length: 40:21
- Label: MCA
- Producer: Jay Beckenstein and Richard Calandra

Spyro Gyra chronology
Morning Dance (1979)	Catching the Sun (1980)	Carnaval (1980)

Professional ratings
Review scores
Source	Rating
Billboard	(unrated)
Record Mirror	2/5 stars

Catching the Sun is the third album by the American jazz group Spyro Gyra, released in 1980 on MCA Records. The album was given gold status by the RIAA on June 5, 1985.

At Billboard magazine, Catching the Sun reached No. 19 on the Top 200 albums chart. The song "Catching the Sun" reached No. 15 on the Adult Contemporary singles chart and No. 68 on the Hot 100 singles chart. The song "Percolator" peaked at No. 48 on the Adult Contemporary singles chart. In Canada, the album reached No. 80 in the Top 100 Album chart.

== Track listing and personnel ==
1. "Catching the Sun" (Jay Beckenstein) – 4:42
  - Jay Beckenstein – alto saxophone, Fender Rhodes
  - Tom Schuman – Fender Rhodes, synthesizers
  - Jeremy Wall – synthesizers, effects
  - Hiram Bullock – acoustic and electric guitars
  - Chet Catallo – electric guitar solos
  - John Tropea – electric rhythm guitar
  - Jim Kurzdorfer – bass guitar
  - Eli Konikoff – drums
  - Gerardo Velez – percussion
  - Dave Samuels – marimba, steel drums
  - Rubens Bassini – congas, percussion
  - Randy Brecker – trumpet solo
2. "Cockatoo" (all members) – 4:04
  - Jay Beckenstein – tenor saxophone, percussion
  - Tom Schuman – Fender Rhodes, synthesizer solos
  - Chet Catallo – electric rhythm guitar
  - Will Lee – bass guitar
  - Eli Konikoff – drums
  - Gerardo Velez – percussion, bongos
  - Jeremy Wall – percussion
  - Richard Calandra – percussion
  - Randy Brecker – trumpet solo
3. "Autumn of Our Love" (Jeremy Wall) – 5:09
  - Jay Beckenstein – alto and soprano saxophones
  - Tom Schuman – Fender Rhodes
  - Jeremy Wall – synthesizers
  - Chet Catallo – electric rhythm guitar
  - John Tropea – acoustic guitar, electric guitar solo
  - Jim Kurzdorfer – bass guitar
  - Eli Konikoff – drums
  - Rubens Bassini – congas
4. "Laser Material" (Tom Schuman) – 4:59
  - Jay Beckenstein – soprano saxophone
  - Tom Schuman – Fender Rhodes, synthesizers, effects, synthesizer programming
  - Steve Nathan – clavinet, synthesizer programming
  - Jeremy Wall – synthesizer programming
  - Chet Catallo – electric rhythm guitar
  - John Tropea – electric rhythm guitar and guitar solo
  - Will Lee – bass guitar
  - Eli Konikoff – drums
  - Gerardo Velez – percussion
  - Richard Calandra – tambourine
  - Dave Samuels – marimba
  - Randy Brecker – trumpet solo
5. "Percolator" (Jay Beckenstein) – 2:28
  - Jay Beckenstein – alto saxophone
  - Tom Schuman – Fender Rhodes, synthesizers
  - Hiram Bullock – lead guitar and electric rhythm guitar
  - Chet Catallo – electric guitar
  - Will Lee – bass guitar
  - Eli Konikoff – drums
  - Gerardo Velez – percussion
  - Dave Samuels – marimba, vibraphone
  - Rubens Bassini – percussion
6. "Philly" (Jim Kurzdorfer) 4:18
  - Jay Beckenstein – alto saxophone
  - Tom Schuman – Fender Rhodes, acoustic piano, synthesizers
  - Chet Catallo – electric guitar solo
  - John Tropea – rhythm guitar
  - Jim Kurzdorfer – bass guitar
  - Eli Konikoff – drums
  - Rubens Bassini – congas
  - Barry Rogers – trombone solo
7. "Lovin' You/Lovin' You (for Christine) (Chet Catallo)" – 4:41
  - Jay Beckenstein – alto saxophone, synthesizer
  - Tom Schuman – Fender Rhodes, synthesizer solo
  - Jeremy Wall – string synthesizer
  - Chet Catallo – electric guitars
  - Will Lee – bass guitar
  - Eli Konikoff – drums
  - Rubens Bassini – percussion
8. "Here Again" (Jay Beckenstein) – 4:56
  - Jay Beckenstein – soprano saxophone
  - Tom Schuman – Fender Rhodes, acoustic piano
  - Jeremy Wall – synthesizers
  - Chet Catallo – electric guitars
  - John Tropea – acoustic guitar
  - Jim Kurzdorfer – bass guitar
  - Eli Konikoff – drums
  - Gerardo Velez – bongos, percussion
  - Dave Samuels – vibraphone
  - Rubens Bassini – congas, percussion
9. "Safari" (Jeremy Wall) – (4:52)
  - Jay Beckenstein – alto saxophone
  - Tom Schuman – Fender Rhodes, synthesizer solo
  - Jeremy Wall – synthesizers
  - Hiram Bullock – guitars
  - Will Lee – bass guitar
  - Eli Konikoff – drums
  - Gerardo Velez – percussion
  - Dave Samuels – marimba
  - Rubens Bassini – congas, percussion
  - Barry Rogers – trombone solo

Horn Section on "Laser Material"

- Jeremy Wall – horn arrangements
- Jay Beckenstein – alto saxophone, horn arrangements
- Bob Malach – tenor saxophone
- Tom Malone – trombone
- Randy Brecker – trumpet

String Section on "Laser Material"

- Jeremy Wall – string arrangements and conductor
- Harry Lookofsky – concertmaster
- Charles McCracken, Jesse Levy and Alan Shulman – cello
- Peter Dimitriades, Lewis Eley, Harold Kohon, Charles Libove, Harry Lookofsky, David Nadien, Matthew Raimondi and Richard Sortomme – violin

=== Production ===
- Jay Beckenstein – producer
- Richard Calandra – producer
- Jeremy Wall – assistant producer
- Michael Barry – engineer
- Jack Malken – engineer
- Jason Corsaro – assistant engineer
- Bob Ludwig – mastering at Masterdisk (New York, NY).
- Peter Corriston – art direction, design
- David Heffernan – illustration

== Charts ==
Chart (1980)	Peak position
Billboard Jazz Albums	1
