= Morning Dance (song) =

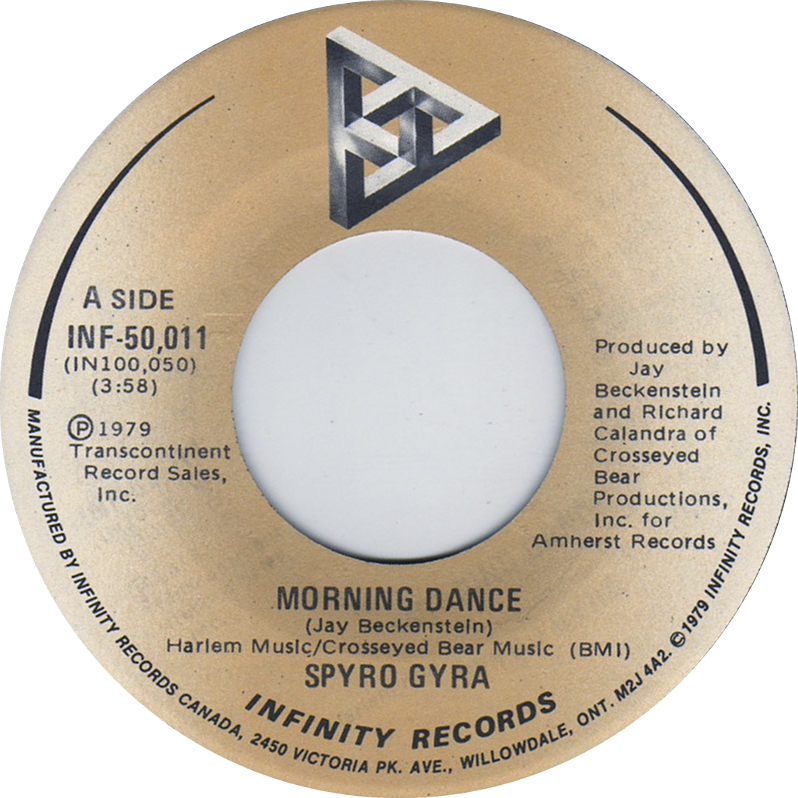
- "Morning Dance" by Spyro Gyra; A-side label of the Canadian single release

Single by Spyro Gyra

from the album Morning Dance
- B-side: "Song for Lorraine"
- Released: 1979
- Recorded: 1979
- Genre: Jazz; easy listening
- Length: 3:58
- Label: Infinity Records
- Songwriter(s): Jay Beckenstein
- Producer(s): Richard Calandra, Jay Beckenstein

Spyro Gyra singles chronology
"Shaker Song" (1978)	"Morning Dance" (1979)	"Jubilee" (1979)

"Morning Dance" is the title of an instrumental recording by the noted smooth jazz/jazz fusion band Spyro Gyra. Songwriter and band member Jay Beckenstein plays the alto sax on this track, and it features a memorable tenor steel pan.

== Charts ==
Chart (1979)	Peak position
Australia (Kent Music Report)	75
United Kingdom (Official Charts Company)	17
US Billboard Hot 100	24
US Adult Contemporary (Billboard)	1
US Cashbox Top 100	27
US Record World Singles Chart	31

== See also ==
- List of number-one adult contemporary singles of 1979 (U.S.)
