= Fool (Al Matthews song) =

Song by Al Matthews
- A-side: "Fool"
- B-side: "Don't Run from My Love"
- Released: 1975
- Length: 3:15
- Label: CBS S CBS 3429
- Composer: Pierre Tubbs
- Producer: Pierre Tubbs

UK chronology
"Fool" (1975)	"(All I Have to Do is) Dream" (1975)

"Fool" was a 1975 single by Al Matthews. It became a hit for him that year, charting nationally in the UK.

== Background ==
"Fool" was written by Pierre Tubbs. The song was backed with an Al Matthews composition, "Don't Run from My Love". Credited to Al Matthews, the songs were released on single, CBS 3429 in 1975. One of the background singers on the session was Maxine Nightingale.

== Reception ==
The single was reviewed by Lynsey de Paul in the 5 July 1975 issue of Record Mirror. She referred to it as a gem and remarkable, making comparisons to the Four Seasons and Philly group sound. She said to the readers to do their darndest to make sure it was the smash it deserved to be. She finished off with calling it compulsive play it again quality.

According to DJ Hotline in the 2 August issue of Record Mirror, Jon Taylor of Crockers, Norwich was the first to list "Fool" by Al Matthews.

== Airplay & television ==
According to Soul Gossip in the 19 July issue of Record Mirror, "Fool" was getting a lot of airtime in London and could be a biggie.

For the week of 23 August, the record was one of the Radio Luxembourg Hot Shots.

The song was performed live on Top of the Pops on Thursday 4th September 1975. Matthews appeared again on Saturday 18th October.

== Chart ==
=== UK ===
For the week of 9 August 1975, "Fool" was at no. 4 on the Record Mirror Star Breakers chart. It maintained that position for another week.

For the week of 23 August, "Fool" was at no. 1 on the Disc Soul Ten chart. It also made its debut at no. 46 in the Record Mirror British Top 50 Singles chart, and the Music Week Top 50 Singles chart It was also at no. 13 on the Wilde Rock playlist.

For the week of 6 September, "Fool" debuted at no. 6 on the Record Mirror & Disc UK Disco Top 20 chart.

For the week of 13 September, "Fool" had dropped down to no. 10 on the Record Mirror & Disc UK Disco Top 20. But it had moved up from no. 21 to no. 8 on the UK Soul Top 20 chart. The record reached its peak position of no. 16 on the Record Mirror & Disc British Top 50 Singles chart that week.

For the week of 20 September, "Fool" peaked at no. 3 in the UK Disco Top 20 chart.

James Hamilton had the record at no. 6 in his James' Top Ten list.

The single had an eight-week run in the national charts.

Chart summary UK
Publication	Chart	Peak	Notes
Record Mirror	Star Breakers	4	
Disc	Soul Ten	1	
Record Mirror & Disc	British Top 50 Singles	16	
Record Mirror & Disc	UK Disco Top 20	3	

=== Europe ===
The single also charted in the Netherlands and Belgium, peaking at no. 11 and no. 44 respectively.
