= Orsa Lia =

Greek-American singer

Orsa Lia (born Orsalia Asteris, 1943) is a Greek-American singer from Franklin, Virginia. She is best known for her 1978 single, "I Never Said I Love You" which topped the Billboard Adult Contemporary chart for one week.

== Early life ==
Orsa Lia was born in 1943 in Franklin, Virginia. Her father, a native of Andros, Greece, died in a traffic accident in 1954. Lia was raised in Virginia and graduated Franklin High School in 1960, after which she moved from Franklin to Knoxville, Tennessee.

During her teens, she performed as a vocalist in several Franklin High School events. On 22 November 1957, she was among the specialty acts for the "Moonlight Minstrel" show at the Franklin High School auditorium, where she sang "Chances Are". In October 1959, she sang "I Believe" at the Franklin High School "College Day" event.

In 1963, she won the title of "Miss Knoxville", competing against 14 others. In the competition, where she was the only vocalist, she sang "Tonight" from West Side Story. She would go on to compete for the title of "Miss Tennessee" in July of the same year.

== Career ==
Orsa Lia released her debut single on RCA Victor, "Chain Of Life" in 1968, written by Ray Willis and Pete DeLong. She would not release another record in her own name until ten years later in 1978. In 1973, Lia sang "Everlasting Love" for the operetta "The Carpenter's Son" by Alex Zanetis. It was released as a single under the pseudonym of Mary Magdalene, whom she portrayed in the operetta. In 1979, she recorded a duet with Dobie Gray.

=== I Never Said I Love You ===
She is best known for her 1978 single, "I Never Said I Love You" which was written and produced by Hal David and Archie Jordan and released on Infinity Records. The song was first recorded by Barbara Mandrell on her 1976 album "Midnight Angel". Although Lia's rendition of "I Never Said I Love You" only reached number 84 on the Billboard Hot 100 pop singles chart in April 1979, the song notably spent one week at number one on the Billboard Adult Contemporary chart that same month. It was Lia's only song to reach the music charts in the United States. It also peaked at number 63 in Australia.

=== Orsa Lia (album) ===
Orsa Lia

Studio album by Orsa Lia
- Released: 1979
- Studio: Columbia Recording Studios, Nashville, Glaser Sound Studios, Nashville
- Genre: Pop
- Length: 29:10
- Label: Infinity Records
- Producer: Hal David, Archie Jordan

Orsa Lia's self-titled debut was released in 1979 on Infinity Records. It was produced by Hal David and Archie Jordan, with arrangements by Archie Jordan. It remains her only known album release.

All lyrics are written by Hal David; all music is composed by Archie Jordan.

Side one
No.	Title	Length
1.	"Now While I Still Remember How"	2:55
2.	"Love Me Good"	3:17
3.	"No Walls, No Ceilings, No Floors"	3:26
4.	"What Am I Supposed To Do"	2:52
5.	"I Never Said I Love You"	3:24
Total length:		15:54

Side two
No.	Title	Length
1.	"I Can't Hold On"	4:06
2.	"Seeing Things The Way They Really Are"	3:46
3.	"The Men In My Life"	2:42
4.	"Above The Tears, Beyond The Pain"	2:42
Total length:		13:16

== See also ==
- List of artists who reached number one on the U.S. Adult Contemporary chart
