= Lead Me On (Maxine Nightingale song) =

Single by Maxine Nightingale

from the album Lead Me On
- B-side: "Love Me Like You Mean It"
- Released: May 1979
- Recorded: 1978
- Genre: Pop, R&B, soul
- Length: 2:48
- Label: Windsong
- Songwriters: Allee Willis, David Lasley
- Producer: Denny Diante

Maxine Nightingale singles chronology
"Right Now" (1977)	"Lead Me On" (1979)	"(Bringin' Out) The Girl in Me" (1979)

"Lead Me On" is a popular song which was a hit single for Maxine Nightingale in 1979.

== Overview ==
The song was written by Allee Willis and David Lasley: (Allee Willis quote:) "David and I were just writing all the time, and there was a song out called 'Emotion' by Samantha Sang that we both really loved. So we said: 'Let’s write something in that spirit.' I was going through a huge breakup at the time, so for me ['Lead Me On'] was just a completely autobiographical song."

"Lead Me On" was introduced on Love Lines which was Nightingale's third album for United Artists Records. Love Lines was issued in 1978 in the UK and Europe and "Lead Me On" was the second of two non-charting singles from the album, the first being "(Bringing Out) The Girl in Me").

Although United Artists did not release "Lead Me On" or its parent album in the US, Al Teller, who had been president of United Artists when Nightingale recorded her breakout hit "Right Back Where We Started From", made the US release of "Lead Me On" the debut single on Windsong Records shortly after assuming that company's presidency in January 1979; the track began to accrue interest that spring particularly in the easy listening market with the #1 position on the Billboard Adult Contemporary chart attained that July.

In all, "Lead Me On" spent seven weeks atop the AC chart (for the weeks of July 7, 14, and 21; August 4, 11, and 18; and September 1). On the Billboard Hot 100, "Lead Me On" peaked at number five, while reaching number 37 on the R&B chart. Despite the fact that it was an AC song, it enjoyed better success in Canada, where it reached number three on the CRIA singles chart and spent 4 non-consecutive weeks at number one on the RPM Dance Music Chart.

Nightingale herself would describe "Lead Me On" as (Maxine Nightingale quote:) "[a] sweet, simple little song", adding that its being chosen as a single was a decision with which she had disagreed.

== Charts ==
=== Weekly charts ===
Chart (1979)	Peak position
Australia (Kent Music Report)	58
Canada RPM Top Singles	2
Canada (CRIA)	3
New Zealand (Recorded Music NZ)	8
US Billboard Hot 100	5

=== Year-end charts ===
Year-end chart (1979)	Rank
Canada (RPM Top 200 Singles)	4
US Top Pop Singles (Billboard)	24

== Other versions ==
"Lead Me On" has also been recorded by the Nolans (album Making Waves/ 1980) and Sharon Cuneta (album Isn't It Romantic? Vol 2/ 2007).

== See also ==
- List of number-one adult contemporary singles of 1979 (U.S.)
