= Gotta Be the One =

Song by Maxine Nightingale
- A-side: "Gotta Be the One"
- B-side: "Can't Get Enough"
- Released: 1976
- Length: 2:59
- Label: United Artists Records UP 36086
- Composer: Pierre Tubbs
- Producer: Pierre Tubbs

Maxine Nightingale singles chronology
"Right Back Where We Started From" (1975)	"Gotta Be the One" (1976)	"Think I Want to Possess You" (1976)

"Gotta Be the One" was a 1976 single for Maxine Nightingale. It became a hit for her that year, charting in the United States and New Zealand.

== Background ==
"Gotta Be the One" was written and produced by Pierre Tubbs. Maxine Nightingale recorded the song which was backed with "Can't Get Enough" and released in the UK on United Artists UP 36086. It was released in the US on United Artists UA XW820 Y.

== Reception ==
"Gotta be the One" was reviewed by Record World the week of 26 June 1976. In addition to mentioning how the phenomenal success of "Right Back Where We Started From" was a surprise to Maxine Nightingale, this similarly styled follow up with its emotive vocal should take her right back into the charts.

For the week of 3 July, "Gotta Be the One" was one of Dede Dabney's three Ditties to Watch.

== Airplay ==
=== Canada ===
For the week of 26 June, as shown in RPM Weekly, "Gotta Be the One" had charted at CKAR in Huntsville, where it was a Hitmaker. It was also a Hitmaker at CKNX, where it was also playlisted.

=== United States ===
For the week of 3 July, the MOR Report in Record World showed that "Gotta Be the One" by Maxine Nightingale was one of the three most added singles.

As reported by Billboard in the magazine's 17 July issue, "Gotta Be the One" was one of nineteen songs added to BMI's million performance list. As described in the article, when a song has an average length of three minutes reaches the million-performance level, it has had radio airplay of more than 50,000 hours.

For the week of 23 July, "Gotta Be the One" made its appearance at no. 25 in the Gavin Report Adult Contemporary Programming chart.

== Charts ==
=== United States ===
For the week of 10 July 1976 "Gotta Be the One" debuted at no. 124 on the Record World 101 - 150 Singles chart. For the week of 14 August, the single peaked at no. 102.

For the week of 17 July. "Gotta Be the One" debuted at No. 49 in the Billboard Easy Listening Top 50. It debuted at No. 78 on the Billboard Hot 100 chart. For the week of 7 August, "Gotta Be the One" peaked at No. 22 on the Billboard Easy Listening chart. It held that position for another week. For the week of 14 August, the single peaked at No. 53 on the Billboard Hot 100 chart.

The single reached No. 84 on the Cash Box Singles chart.

=== New Zealand ===
It was a hit in New Zealand where it spent eight weeks in the charts, peaking at No. 19.
