= List of artists who reached number one on the U.S. Adult Contemporary chart =

The following is a list of artists who have reached number one on the adult contemporary music singles chart in Billboard magazine since the chart's inception in 1961. The chart has gone by a variety of names over the years, including Easy Listening, Pop Standard, Middle-Road, and the current Adult Contemporary.

- All acts are listed alphabetically.
- Solo artists are alphabetised by last name, Groups by group name excluding "A," "An" and "The.".
- Each act's total of number-one singles is shown after their name.
- Featured artists that have been given credit on the record are included

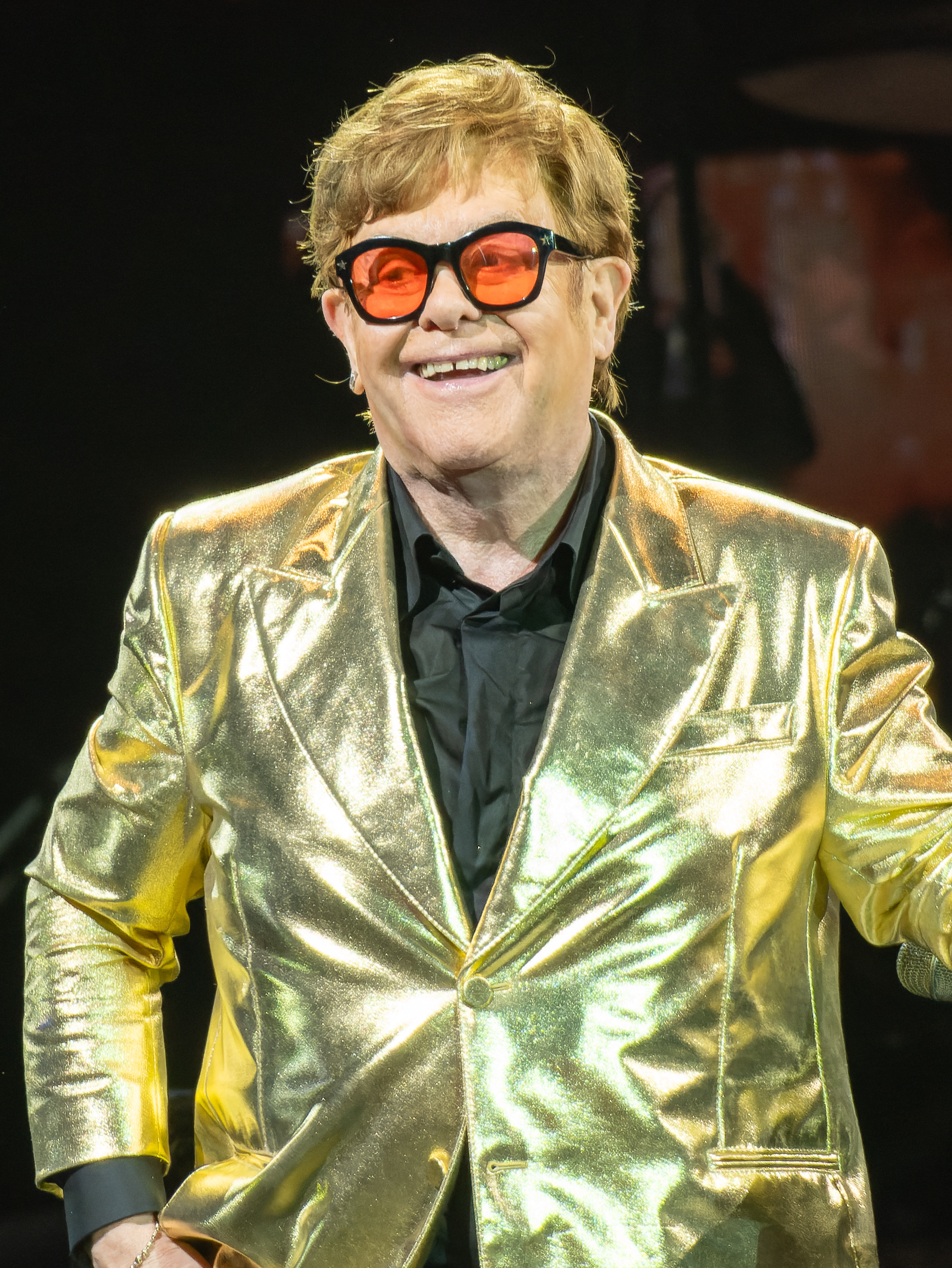
Elton John holds the record for the most number-ones songs and by a male artist with 18.

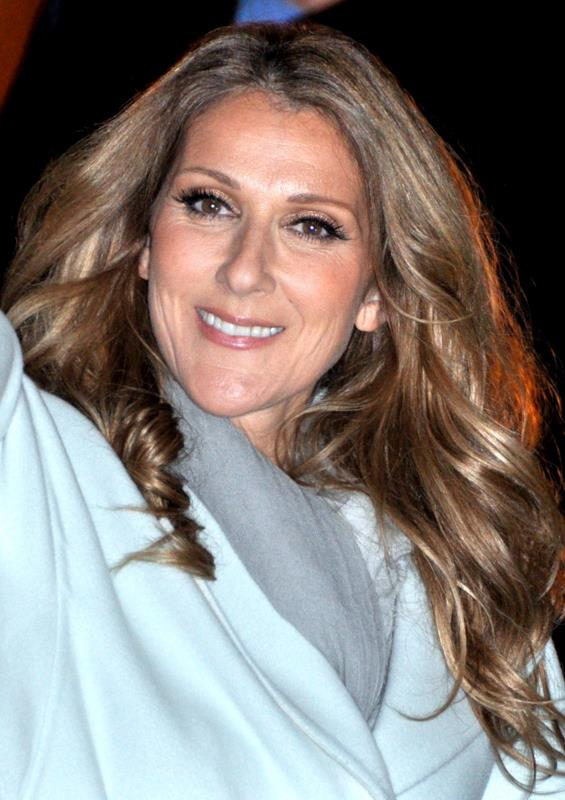
Celine Dion holds the record for a female artist With 11.

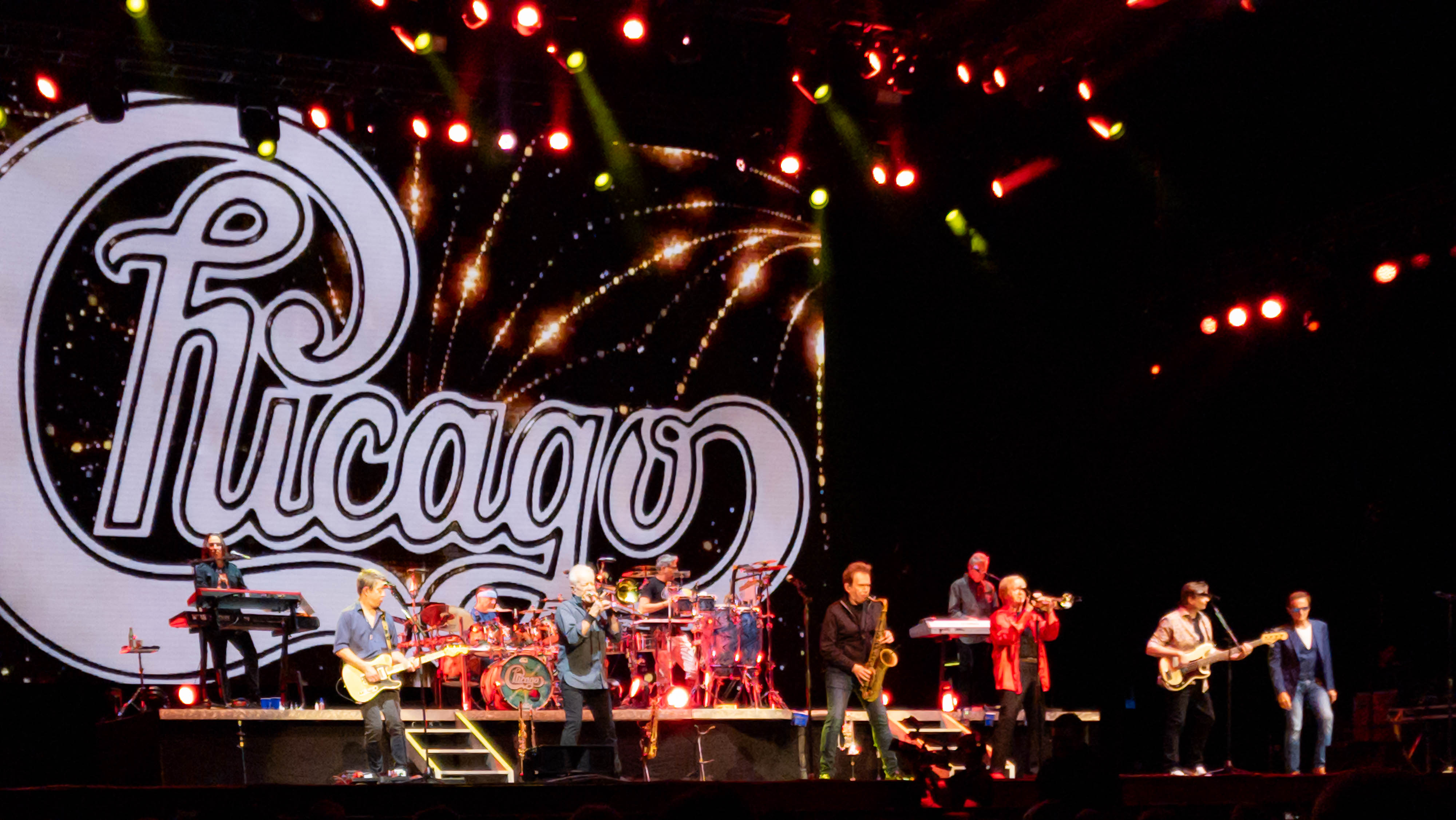
Chicago holds the record for a band With 8.

== A ==
- ABBA (2)
- Paula Abdul (1)
- Bryan Adams (2)
- Adele (6)
- Christina Aguilera (1)
- Air Supply (3)
- Herb Alpert (5)
- America (3)
- Ed Ames (3)
- Carl Anderson (1)
- Paul Anka (1)
- Marc Anthony (1)
- Louis Armstrong (1)
- Eddy Arnold (2)
- Rick Astley (3)
- Atlantic Starr (2)
- Patti Austin (1)
- Frankie Avalon (1)

== B ==
- Backstreet Boys (3)
- Joan Baez (1)
- Anita Baker (1)
- George Baker Selection (1)
- Kenny Ball (1)
- The Band Perry (1)
- The Bangles (1)
- Sara Bareilles (1)
- BBMak (1)
- The Beatles (1)
- Natasha Bedingfield (1)
- Bee Gees (2)
- Regina Belle (1)
- Brook Benton (1)
- Justin Bieber (1)
- Acker Bilk (1)
- Stephen Bishop (1)
- Blood, Sweat and Tears (1)
- James Blunt (1)
- Michael Bolton (9)
- Benson Boone (1)
- Debby Boone (1)
- Boy Meets Girl (1)
- Boyz II Men (2)
- Michelle Branch (1)
- Laura Branigan (1)
- Toni Braxton (1)
- Bread (4)
- Breathe (1)
- Jim Brickman (2)
- Brotherhood of Man (1)
- Peabo Bryson (3)
- Michael Bublé (6)
- Jimmy Buffett (1)

== C ==
- Colbie Caillat (3)
- Alessia Cara (1)
- Glen Campbell (8)
- Lewis Capaldi (1)
- Captain & Tennille (5)
- Mariah Carey (7)
- Bob Carlisle (1)
- Vanessa Carlton (1)
- Eric Carmen (2)
- The Carpenters (15)
- Kim Carnes (1)
- Vikki Carr (2)
- Keith Carradine (1)
- The Cars (1)
- Mel Carter (2)
- The Cascades (1)
- Harry Wayne Casey (1)
- Johnny Cash (1)
- David Cassidy (1)
- Peter Cetera (5)
- Chad and Jeremy (1)
- The Chainsmokers (1)
- Champaign (1)
- Ray Charles (3)
- Ray Charles Singers (1)
- Cher (3)
- Chicago (8)
- Eric Clapton (2)
- Petula Clark (2)
- Kelly Clarkson (3)
- Coldplay (2)
- Nat King Cole (1)
- Natalie Cole (1)
- Phil Collins (8)
- Shawn Colvin (1)
- The Commodores (1)
- Perry Como (3)
- Ray Conniff (1)
- David Cook (1)
- Rita Coolidge (2)
- Jim Croce (2)
- Christopher Cross (3)
- Sheryl Crow (2)
- Miley Cyrus (2)

== D ==
- Lauren Daigle (1)
- Dale and Grace (1)
- Daughtry (1)
- Mac Davis (2)
- Sammy Davis Jr. (2)
- Skeeter Davis (1)
- Taylor Dayne (1)
- Jimmy Dean (1)
- DeBarge (3)
- Kiki Dee (1)
- Cathy Dennis (1)
- John Denver (9)
- Teri DeSario (1)
- Neil Diamond (8)
- Dido (1)
- Celine Dion (11)
- Dixie Chicks (1)
- Joe Dowell (1)

== E ==
- The Eagles (2)
- Sheena Easton (1)
- Edward Bear (1)
- Brett Eldredge (1)
- Yvonne Elliman (1)
- England Dan & John Ford Coley (4)
- Enya (1)
- Gloria Estefan / Miami Sound Machine (7)
- Melissa Etheridge (1)
- Exposé (2)

== F ==
- Jimmy Fallon (1)
- Harold Faltermeyer (1)
- The 5th Dimension (5)
- Fergie (1)
- Firefall (1)
- Five for Fighting (1)
- Roberta Flack (4)
- Fleetwood Mac (3)
- Dan Fogelberg (4)
- Foreigner (1)
- Connie Francis (2)
- The Fray (1)

== G ==
- Art Garfunkel (4)
- Gale Garnett (1)
- Siedah Garrett (1)
- John Gary (1)
- Genesis (3)
- Stan Getz / Astrud Gilberto (1)
- Barry Gibb (1)
- Grey (1)
- Bobby Goldsboro (2)
- Gotye (1)
- Goo Goo Dolls(1)
- Amy Grant (3)
- Lorne Greene (1)
- Josh Groban (6)

== H ==
- Hall & Oates (2)
- Hamilton, Joe Frank & Reynolds (1)
- Marvin Hamlisch (1)
- Albert Hammond (1)
- Harpers Bizarre (1)
- Rolf Harris (1)
- George Harrison (2)
- Donny Hathaway (1)
- Sophie B. Hawkins (1)
- Heart (1)
- Don Henley (2)
- Al Hirt (1)
- The Highwaymen (1)
- Bertie Higgins (1)
- Faith Hill (4)
- Warren Hill (1)
- The Honeydrippers (1)
- Mary Hopkin (1)
- Bruce Hornsby (3)
- Whitney Houston (10)
- Engelbert Humperdinck (4)

== I ==
- Enrique Iglesias (1)
- Janis Ian (1)
- Frank Ifield (1)
- James Ingram (2)
- Ronald Isley (1)
- Burl Ives (1)

== J ==
- Terry Jacks (1)
- Janet Jackson (1)
- Jermaine Jackson (1)
- Michael Jackson (2)
- Tommy James (1)
- Horst Jankowski (1)
- Al Jarreau (1)
- The Jets (2)
- Jewel (1)
- Billy Joel (8)
- Elton John (18)
- Johnny Hates Jazz (1)
- Michael Johnson (1)
- Jonas Brothers (3)
- Howard Jones (2)
- Jack Jones (3)
- Tom Jones (3)
- Journey (1)

== K ==
- R. Kelly (1)
- Anna Kendrick (1)
- Kenny G (2)
- Kimbra (1)
- Carole King (4)
- Gladys Knight (1)
- Fred Knoblock (1)
- Kool & The Gang (1)

== L ==
- Lady Antebellum (2)
- Frankie Laine (1)
- Kendrick Lamar (1)
- Nicolette Larson (1)
- Cyndi Lauper (1)
- Steve Lawrence (1)
- Brenda Lee (1)
- Peggy Lee (1)
- John Legend (2)
- Julian Lennon (1)
- The Lettermen (1)
- Gary Lewis & the Playboys (1)
- Huey Lewis and the News (2)
- Leona Lewis (1)
- Orsa Lia (1)
- Lifehouse (1)
- Gordon Lightfoot (4)
- Dua Lipa (2)
- Lobo (4)
- Kimberley Locke (3)
- Dave Loggins (1)
- Kenny Loggins (1)
- Gloria Loring (1)
- Los Lonely Boys (1)
- Love Unlimited Orchestra (1)
- The Lumineers (1)

== M ==
- MAGIC! (1)
- MFSB (1)
- Mary MacGregor (1)
- Matchbox Twenty (2)
- Madonna (5)
- Melissa Manchester (1)
- Henry Mancini (1)
- Chuck Mangione (2)
- Barry Manilow (13)
- Post Malone (1)
- Maroon 5 (4)
- Bobbi Martin (1)
- Dean Martin (5)
- Marilyn Martin (1)
- Al Martino (4)
- Bruno Mars (2)
- Richard Marx (4)
- Johnny Mathis (2)
- Paul Mauriat (1)
- John Mayer (1)
- Martina McBride (1)
- Paul McCartney (3)
- Seth MacFarlane (1)
- Maureen McGovern (1)
- Brian McKnight (1)
- Sarah McLachlan (1)
- Don McLean (2)
- Christine McVie (1)
- Bill Medley (1)
- John Mellencamp (1)
- Sérgio Mendes (2)
- Shawn Mendes (3)
- Idina Menzel (1)
- George Michael (4)
- Bette Midler (3)
- Mike + The Mechanics (1)
- Roger Miller (2)
- Ronnie Milsap (2)
- Joni Mitchell (1)
- Hugo Montenegro (1)
- The Moody Blues (1)
- Bob Moore (1)
- Maren Morris (2)
- Jason Mraz (1)
- Michael Martin Murphey (1)
- Anne Murray (8)

== N ==
- 'NSync (1)
- Johnny Nash (1)
- Meshell Ndegeocello (1)
- Ricky Nelson (2)
- Aaron Neville (3)
- New Vaudeville Band (1)
- NewSong (1)
- Juice Newton (3)
- Olivia Newton-John (10)
- Nico & Vinz (1)
- Maxine Nightingale (1)
- Harry Nilsson (1)

== O ==
- Gilbert O'Sullivan (2)
- Billy Ocean (3)
- Oliver (1)
- OneRepublic (1)
- Roy Orbison (1)
- Tony Orlando & Dawn (3)
- Jeffrey Osborne (1)
- Donny Osmond (2)
- Marie Osmond (3)
- The Osmonds (1)

== P ==
- Martin Page (1)
- Dolly Parton (2)
- Gwyneth Paltrow (1)
- Passenger (1)
- Pentatonix (1)
- Katy Perry (3)
- Peter, Paul & Mary (3)
- Phillip Phillips (2)
- Pink (6)
- Gene Pitney (1)
- Rachel Platten (1)
- Poco (1)
- Daniel Powter (1)
- Elvis Presley (7)
- Pure Prairie League (1)

== Q–R ==
- Eddie Rabbitt (1)
- Gerry Rafferty (1)
- Rascal Flatts (1)
- Lou Rawls (1)
- Chris Rea (1)
- Helen Reddy (8)
- The Rembrandts (1)
- Diane Renay (1)
- Mike Reno (1)
- Restless Heart (1)
- Charlie Rich (4)
- Lionel Richie (11)
- The Righteous Brothers (1)
- LeAnn Rimes (1)
- Miguel Ríos (1)
- Smokey Robinson (1)
- Julie Rogers (1)
- Kenny Rogers (8)
- Linda Ronstadt (2)
- Rooftop Singers (1)
- David Rose (1)
- Diana Ross (4)
- Nate Ruess (1)
- Andy Russell (1)

== S ==
- Sade (2)
- Barry Sadler (1)
- Kyu Sakamoto (1)
- Santana (1)
- Savage Garden (2)
- Leo Sayer (2)
- Seal (2)
- John Sebastian (1)
- Neil Sedaka (3)
- Bob Seger (1)
- The Script (1)
- Sheriff (1)
- Ed Sheeran (5)
- Sia (2)
- Frank Sinatra (1)
- Carly Simon (2)
- Paul Simon (3)
- Simon & Garfunkel (2)
- Simply Red (1)
- Frank Sinatra (6)
- Nancy Sinatra (2)
- The Singing Nun (1)
- Michael W. Smith (1)
- Sam Smith (1)
- Patty Smyth (1)
- Snow Patrol (1)
- Phoebe Snow (1)
- Sonny & Cher (1)
- Sons of the Desert (1)
- David Soul (1)
- Sounds Orchestral (1)
- JD Souther (1)
- Esperanza Spalding (1)
- Spandau Ballet (1)
- Bruce Springsteen (1)
- Spyro Gyra (1)
- Ringo Starr (1)
- Kristy Starling (1)
- Starship (2)
- Cat Stevens (2)
- Ray Stevens (1)
- B. W. Stevenson (1)
- Stevie B (1)
- Al Stewart (1)
- Rod Stewart (4)
- Barbra Streisand (8)
- Surface (1)
- Survivor (1)
- Harry Styles (2)
- Patrick Swayze (1)
- Taylor Swift (9)
- Teddy Swims (1)
- Swing Out Sister (2)

== T–V ==
- A Taste of Honey (1)
- James Taylor (5)
- 38 Special (1)
- B.J. Thomas (4)
- Rob Thomas (1)
- Sue Thompson (1)
- The Three Degrees (2)
- Three Dog Night (2)
- Tiffany (1)
- Justin Timberlake (1)
- Toby Beau (1)
- Toto (2)
- Train (4)
- Meghan Trainor (3)
- Tina Turner (1)
- Shania Twain (4)
- Uncle Kracker (1)
- USA for Africa (1)
- Jerry Vale (1)
- Vangelis (1)
- Randy VanWarmer (1)
- Billy Vera (1)
- The Village Stompers (1)
- Bobby Vinton (4)
- The Vogues (1)

== W–Z ==
- Jack Wagner (1)
- Walk the Moon (1)
- War (1)
- Jennifer Warnes (2)
- Alex Warren (1)
- Dionne Warwick (6)
- We Five (1)
- Eric Weissberg and Steve Mandell (1)
- Wham! (1)
- Bryan White (1)
- Margaret Whiting (1)
- Roger Whittaker (1)
- Andy Williams (4)
- Deniece Williams (1)
- Mason Williams (1)
- Pharrell Williams (1)
- Roger Williams (1)
- Vanessa Williams (2)
- Ann Wilson (1)
- Wilson Phillips (3)
- Wings (3)
- Steve Winwood (4)
- Lee Ann Womack (1)
- Stevie Wonder (8)
- John Paul Young (1)
- Paul Young (3)
- The Weeknd (1)
- Zager & Evans (1)
- Zedd (1)
