= Chet Catallo =

American jazz guitarist (born 1953)

- Born: Chet Daniel Catallo; March 11, 1953 (age 73); Rochester, New York, U.S.
- Genres: Jazz, jazz fusion, smooth jazz
- Occupation: Musician
- Instrument: Guitar
- Years active: 1962–present
- Labels: Amherst, Infinity, MCA
- Website: www.chetcatallo.com

Chet Catallo (born March 11, 1953) is an American jazz guitarist known for his work as a member of the band Spyro Gyra.

== Music career ==
In 1978, Catallo joined the group Spyro Gyra while they were recording the album Morning Dance. This record featured his composition "It Doesn't Matter". With Spyro Gyra, he earned six Grammy Award nominations. He composed and performed the songs Loving You (from 1980's Catching the Sun) and Cafe Amore (from Carnaval). In 1986, he formed the band Chet Catallo and the Cats, who released the album First Take in 2010.

== Gear ==
Catallo plays a Gibson Custom Shop Model Guitar, a Chet Catallo signature Custom 335 Dot Model Series 1958 reissue.

== Discography ==
Solo

- First Take

With Spyro Gyra

- Spyro Gyra (1978)
- Morning Dance, (MCA, 1979)
- Catching the Sun, (MCA, 1980)
- Carnaval, (MCA, 1980)
- Freetime, (MCA, 1981)
- Incognito, (MCA, 1982)
- City Kids, (MCA, 1983)
- Access All Areas, (MCA 1984)
