= Al Matthews (actor) =

American actor and singer

- Matthews c. 1986
- Born: Alexander Basil Matthews; November 21, 1942; Brooklyn, New York, U.S.
- Died: September 22, 2018 (aged 75); Orihuela, Alicante, Spain
- Occupations: United States Marine; Actor; singer; songwriter
- Years active: 1975–1997, 2011–2018
- Known for: Aliens (1986)
- Awards: 13, including 2 Purple Hearts

Alexander Basil Matthews (November 21, 1942 – September 22, 2018), commonly known as Al Matthews, was an American actor, singer, and radio personality. He was best known for his appearance as Gunnery sergeant Apone in the 1986 film Aliens.

== Early life and military career ==
Matthews was born in Brooklyn, New York on November 21, 1942. He was a member of the United States Marine Corps who graduated at Parris Island on May 25, 1966, and served during the Vietnam War. On his website, he stated:

I spent six years in the United States Marine Corps; I hold thirteen combat awards and decorations, including two purple hearts. I was the first black Marine in the 1st Marine Division in Vietnam to be meritoriously promoted to the rank of sergeant; I served with Kilo Battery, Fourth Battalion, 11th Marines, 1st Marine Division, of that I am very proud.

== Acting and musical career ==
=== Music ===
Similar to US supply sergeant Chuck Bennett who was stationed in Germany, sang soul music and had a couple of chart hits as well as acted, Matthews was stationed away from his home and he had an earlier career in music.

In 1975, he scored a musical hit in the UK Singles Chart, "Fool", which reached number 16 in the fall of that year. One of the session singers on the record was Maxine Nightingale who had appeared in the German production of Hair in the early 1970s. Pierre Tubbs who produced Matthews' hit was impressed with Nightingale and he asked Nightingale's Hair co-star, J. Vincent Edwards to co-write a song with him which turned out to be “Right Back Where We Started From”.

In August 1976, Al Matthews & the Last Word were appearing at the Clouds in Brixton, The Pavilion in Bath and the BLue Lagaoon in Newquay.

In 1977, he recorded the single "It's Only Love". Backed with "Stormy Days and Lonely Nights" it was released on Mercury 6007 152.

In 1978, he released the single "People Are People" / "Run to You".

At some stage, Alan Mair played bass in the Al Matthews Band.

=== Film ===
Matthews played various acting roles, such as Ferguson in Rough Cut (1980), a workman in Omen III: The Final Conflict (1981), a Vietnam veteran in The Sender (1982), a fire chief in Superman III (1983), Benedict in The American Way (1986), Sergeant Apone in Aliens (1986), General Tudor in The Fifth Element (1997) and Master Sergeant #3 in Tomorrow Never Dies (1997). He also worked in British television, appearing in Grange Hill as Sam Green, the father of Benny Green, as well as in theater and radio; for the latter, as both an actor (on BBC Radio 4) and a presenter (on BBC Radio 1 and Capital Radio).

He reprised his Aliens role 27 years later, providing the voice of Apone for the video game Aliens: Colonial Marines (2013).

== Death ==
On September 22, 2018, Matthews was found unresponsive by a neighbor in his Orihuela, Spain, home. Matthews had retired there in 2005 after working in the United Kingdom. He was later pronounced dead at age 75. Local reports claim he had battled severe illnesses over the years.

== In popular culture ==
Matthews' portrayal of Sgt. Apone was the inspiration for Sgt. Avery Johnson of the Halo franchise.

== Filmography ==
Year	Title	Role	Notes
1977	The Butterfly Ball	Himself	
1979	Yanks	Black G.I. at Dance	
1980	Rough Cut	Ferguson	
1981	Omen III: The Final Conflict	Chicago Workman	
1981	Ragtime	Maitre D'	
1982	The Sender	Herb	
1983	Superman III	Fire Chief	
1983	Funny Money	1st Hood	
1986	Defense of the Realm	U.S. Controller	
1986	The American Way	Benedict	
1986	Aliens	Gunnery Sergeant Apone	
1987	Out of Order	U.S. DJ	
1987	Coast to Coast	Curtis Duchamps	
1988	Stormy Monday	Radio DJ	
1988	American Roulette	Morrisey	
1994	Desmond's	Reverend Marvin Jones	
1997	The Fifth Element	General Tudor	
1997	Tomorrow Never Dies	U.S. Master Sergeant	
2018	The Price of Death	Williamson	Posthumous release
