= Pierre Tubbs =

- Born: Pierre Richard Roman Tubbs; 1942 (age 82–83)
- Genres: R&B, disco, rock, pop, psychedelic rock
- Occupation(s): Songwriter, record producer, album sleeve designer

Pierre Tubbs (born Pierre Richard Roman Tubbs, 1942) is a British songwriter, record producer and album sleeve designer.

== Background ==
One of his biggest successes is "Right Back Where We Started From", which he co-wrote with J. Vincent Edwards. The song was recorded by Maxine Nightingale and used in the movie Slap Shot. He also co-wrote, with J.J. Jackson, "But It's Alright", which was a hit for Jackson when originally released in 1966, and also when re-released in 1969.

== Career ==
In 1965, Tubbs recorded the band "the Silence" (pre-John's Children), which was not released at the time. In 1966, he was a producer at Strike Records where, under the pseudonym Peter Richards, he recorded and released Sophisticated Beggar, the first album by Roy Harper. In 1967, Tubbs became an A&R person. in the role of creative manager, for United Artists Records.

Tubbs wrote and produced the song "Fool" for Al Matthews. The song became a hit, peaking at no. 16 on the Record Mirror & Disc British Top 50 Singles chart for the week of 13 September 1975. One of the session singers on the record was Maxine Nightingale who had appeared in the German production of Hair in the early 1970s. Tubbs who produced Matthews' hit was impressed with Nightingale and he asked Nightingale's Hair co-star, J. Vincent Edwards to co-compose a song with him which turned out to be "Right Back Where We Started From". He also wrote "Gotta Be the One" for Nightingale.

In 1999, a compilation album, Pierre's Plastic Dream - The Basement Tapes 1966-1968 was released by Market Square Records. The album contained performances by Our Plastic Dream, where Tubbs was the lead singer, The Silence, The Jeeps and The Owl. The album included two songs with J.J. Jackson and The Jeeps, including a version of "But It's Alright". The album is described as "an extremely rare compilation...an amazing range of musical style, from pop through R 'n' B and psychedelic".
