= J. Vincent Edwards =

British singer

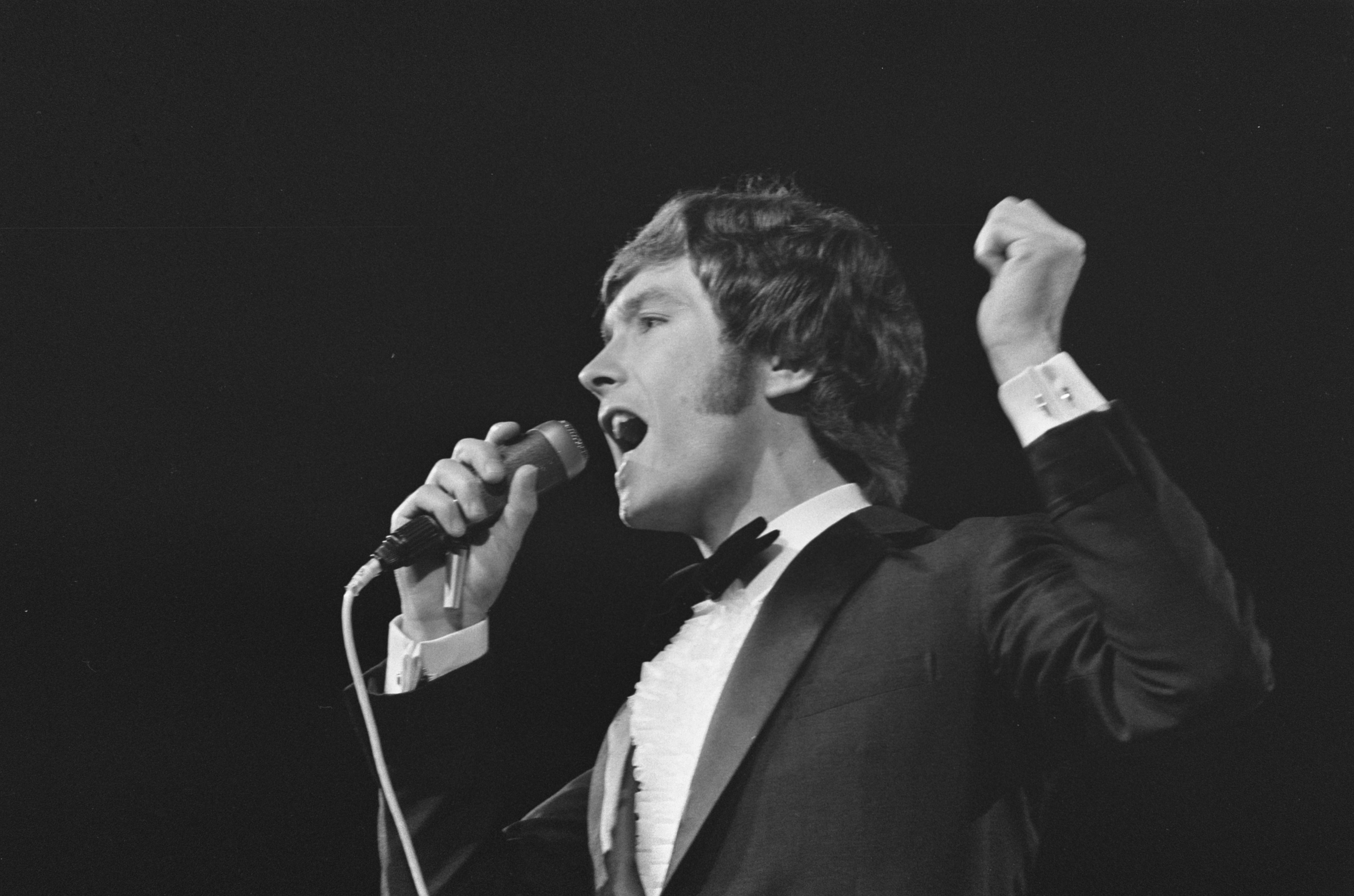
J. Vincent Edwards during the Grand Gala du Disque in Amsterdam in 1970

J. Vincent Edwards (born 20 June 1945) is a British singer. He became well known in the musical Hair in 1968, and began recording a series of singles. The most notable was a song called "Thanks" (1969), which has subsequently appeared on a number of compilation albums. Edwards also contributed to the Bloomfield soundtrack.

Later Edwards turned to song writing. With Pierre Tubbs he wrote "Right Back Where We Started From", which was a No. 8 hit in the UK Singles Chart for Maxine Nightingale in November 1975, and a No. 2 hit in the US in May 1976. In addition, Edwards wrote songs with Miki Antony and Kris Ife.

Edwards was also a part of the trio Star Turn on 45 (Pints), who had a UK hit with "Pump Up the Bitter" in 1988. He released a solo album entitled Thanks in 1970.

== Partial singles discography ==
- "Aquarius" (as Vince Edward, United Artists 1968)
- "Thanks" (1969)
- "Who Are My Friends" (1970)
- "(Sha La La La La) Shangri-La" (1971)
- "Wonderland" (1974)
- "Love Hit Me" (1976)
- "Hands Off" (1980)
