= Lead Me On (Maxine Nightingale album) =

Studio album by Maxine Nightingale
- Released: 1978
- Recorded: 1978
- Genre: R&B
- Length: 31:41
- Label: Windsong
- Producer: Denny Diante; Ray Parker Jr. (co-producer, tracks 2 and 4)

Maxine Nightingale chronology
Night Life (1977)	Lead Me On (1978)	Bittersweet (1980)

Singles from Lead Me On
- 1. "Lead Me On" Released: August 1978 (UK); May 1979 (US); 2. "Bringing Out (The Girl in Me)" Released: September 1979

Professional ratings
Review scores
Source	Rating
AllMusic	2.5/5 stars

Lead Me On is the third studio album by British singer Maxine Nightingale. It peaked at number 45 on the Billboard Top LPs & Tape chart and at number 35 on the R&B albums chart. In the UK, the album had a different track listing and was titled Love Lines.

== Track listing ==
Side one

1. "Hideaway" (Richard Ellison, Phyllis Brown) – 5:55
2. "(Bringing Out) The Girl in Me" (Ray Parker Jr.) – 3:30
3. "Darlin' Dear" (Pam Sawyer, Marilyn McLeod) – 3:07
4. "Love Me Like You Mean It" (Parker Jr.) – 3:03

Side two

1. "Lead Me On" (Allee Willis, David Lasley) – 2:48
2. "No One Like My Baby" (Fred Bliffert) – 3:07
3. "You Got to Me" (Len Boone) – 3:00
4. "Ask Billy (They Tell Me)" (LeRoy Bell, Casey James) – 3:10
5. "You Are the Most Important Person in Your Life" (Sawyer, McLeod) – 4:08

== Charts ==
Chart (1979)	Peak position
US Billboard 200	45
US Soul LPs (Billboard)	35
