= Right Back Where We Started From =

1975 song by Maxine Nightingale

- French vinyl picture sleeve

Single by Maxine Nightingale

from the album Right Back Where We Started From
- B-side: "Believe in What You Do"
- Released: 1975 (International); February 1976 (U.S.)
- Recorded: 1975
- Genre: Disco; funk
- Length: 3:18
- Label: United Artists
- Songwriters: Pierre Tubbs and J. Vincent Edwards
- Producers: J. Vincent Edwards, Pierre Tubbs

Maxine Nightingale singles chronology
"Love on Borrowed Time" (1971)	"Right Back Where We Started From" (1975)	"Gotta Be the One" (1976)

Music video
- "Right Back Where We Started From" on YouTube

"Right Back Where We Started From" is a song written by Pierre Tubbs and J. Vincent Edwards, which was first recorded in 1975 by the British singer Maxine Nightingale for whom it was an international hit. In 1989, a remake by British singer Sinitta reached No. 4 on the UK Singles Chart.

== Maxine Nightingale version ==
=== In the UK ===
In a 3 May 2008 interview with Michael Shelley of WFMU, Edwards recalled that after hearing Maxine Nightingale sing on the session for Al Matthews' "Fool", that track's producer Pierre Tubbs had come up with "Right Back Where We Started From" as a good title for a song for Nightingale herself to record and had invited Edwards to co-write the song. Utilizing a tune which Edwards had written "a couple of years before", Tubbs and Edwards wrote "Right Back Where We Started From" in about seven minutes while driving to Charing Cross Hospital where Tubbs' wife Gabrielle (née Zimmerman) was set to give birth to Tubbs' daughter Nadine. A rough demo featuring Edwards' vocal was cut the next day and it was Edwards, who had performed with Nightingale in the West End production of Hair, who approached Nightingale with an offer for her to record the song.

The song heavily reflects Edwards' admiration for the Motown songwriting team of Holland–Dozier–Holland. The music also has a resemblance to the song "Goodbye, Nothing to Say", written by Stephen Jameson and Marshall Doctores, which was recorded first by Jameson under the name of Nosmo King, and then by the Javells featuring Nosmo King (UK No. 26), both in 1974.

Nightingale recorded "Right Back Where We Started From" within a week of Edwards offering her the song, although she had initially refused, succumbing to Edwards' persuasion only on the condition that the track be released under a pseudonym. Edwards also had to convince Nightingale to accept a royalty payment rather than a one-time session fee equivalent to US$45. "Right Back Where We Started From" would ultimately be released in Nightingale's real name; she would also be awarded a more substantial royalty than she had agreed to. According to Edwards, consideration was given to "Right Back Where We Started From" being recorded as a duet featuring Nightingale and himself, but this possibility ended when Private Stock Records recruited Edwards to cut a remake of "The Worst That Could Happen". Nightingale had opined to Rolling Stone that Edwards' vocal on the demo was "pretty horrendous".

"Right Back Where We Started From" was recorded at Central Sound Studio, a small demo studio on Denmark Street near Soho. Personnel on the session included two former members of the Electric Light Orchestra, bass guitarist Mike de Albuquerque and violinist Wilfred Gibson (who did the strings arrangement). In the WFMU interview, Edwards identified other players on the session as drummer Pete Kircher and keyboardist Dave Rowberry. Also, Tubbs played guitar and Edwards provided percussion. Nightingale would advise Rolling Stone that she had disliked Tubbs's utilization of both a crashing keyboard arrangement and heavy hand claps; she was also discomforted by being required to sing in a higher key than she was accustomed to.

Mike de Albuquerque recalled, "We were doing...one of those demo sessions where everybody goes and sits down with music in front of you and you try and get through as many tunes as possible....I remember [Pierre Tubbs]...saying, listen guys, I want to record in entirety four pieces in this three hour session...and we recorded two pieces with Maxine and two with somebody else....[Let] me stress, it was a demo session that this multi million selling thing came out of, it wasn't let's go and remake it... it was the original demo session....[That] multi million selling recording, I would think, cost [Tubbs] less than a £100 if you put the other tracks into the pudding."

Released within two weeks of its recording by United Artists, who employed Tubbs in its art department, "Right Back Where We Started From" broke in the London discos and reached No. 8 on the UK Singles Chart dated 29 November 1975.

=== In the US ===
United Artists issued "Right Back Where We Started From" in the US in January 1976, and the single entered the charts in February to rise as high as No. 2 on the Billboard Hot 100 on 1 May 1976. The single reached number 1 on Cash Box and Record World. On 27 April, the single received Gold certification for sales of a million units.

"Right Back Where We Started From" also appeared on Billboard's Adult Contemporary and Black Singles charts at No. 5 and No. 46, respectively.

Following the single's US success, Nightingale completed a Right Back Where We Started From album with Tubbs producing; Billboard ranked the album at No. 65.

=== Personnel ===
- Maxine Nightingale: lead & backing vocals
- Pierre Tubbs: guitars, Elka synthesizer, percussion, backing vocals
- Mike de Albuquerque: bass
- Pete Kircher: drums
- Al Matthews, Pete Kircher: backing vocals
- Peter Hughes: baritone saxophone
- Vince Edwards: percussion, backing vocals
- Wilf Gibson: string arrangements and conductor

== Charts ==
=== Weekly charts ===
Chart (1975–1976)	Peak position
Australia (Kent Music Report)	4
Belgium (Ultratop)	2
Canada Top Singles (RPM)	5
Canada Adult Contemporary (RPM)	1
France (IFOP)	10
Ireland (IRMA)	14
Netherlands	3
New Zealand (Recorded Music NZ)	6
Sweden (Sverigetopplistan)	9
UK Singles (OCC)	8
US Billboard Hot 100	2
US Adult Contemporary (Billboard)	5
US R&B (Billboard)	46
US Cash Box Top 100	1
West Germany (Official German Charts)	38

=== Year-end charts ===
Chart (1976)	Rank
Australia (Kent Music Report)	32
Canada Top Singles (RPM)	116
US Billboard Hot 100	28
US Adult Contemporary (Billboard)	48

=== All-time charts ===
Chart (1958-2018)	Position
US Billboard Hot 100	591

== Soundtrack appearances ==
"Right Back Where We Started From" was prominently featured in the 1977 film Slap Shot, during the scenes where the Charlestown Chiefs hockey team are traveling on their bus, and during the end credits. The VHS release of Slap Shot replaced "Right Back Where We Started From", and all other songs featured in the film, with stock music due to licensing issues. When Slap Shot was released on DVD in 2002, the original songs were restored. In the premiere episode of the HBO series 24/7, which focused on the 2011 NHL Winter Classic, "Right Back Where We Started From" was played over footage of the Pittsburgh Penguins traveling to the game, as an homage to Slap Shot. As a similar homage, the song is played after home wins by the New York Islanders, the Toronto Maple Leafs and the Sheffield Steelers, while the New York Rangers played the song in their locker room after home wins during the 2013-14 season. TD Garden organist Ron Poster occasionally plays the song during Boston Bruins games, and The Hanson Brothers (who were named after a group of characters in Slap Shot) recorded a punk rock version of the song for the soundtrack of Slap Shot 3: The Junior League, under the title "Get it Right Back".

The song is also featured in the 2004 action comedy film Starsky & Hutch, during a scene where Ben Stiller's Starsky and Owen Wilson's Hutch are going clubbing to a disco with two eye-witness cheerleaders.

== Sinitta version ==
"Right Back Where We Started From"

Single by Sinitta

from the album Wicked
- B-side: "I Just Can't Help It"
- Released: May 1989
- Recorded: 1989
- Genre: Hi-NRG; bubblegum pop
- Length: 3:16
- Label: Fanfare Records
- Songwriters: J. Vincent Edwards, Pierre Tubbs
- Producer: Pete Hammond

Sinitta singles chronology
"I Don't Believe In Miracles" (1988)	"Right Back Where We Started From" (1989)	"Love on a Mountain Top" (1989)

Music video
- "Right Back Where We Started From" on YouTube

A 1989 cover version of "Right Back Where We Started From" was released by British pop/R&B singer Sinitta and included on her second album, Wicked (1989). It was released as the album's second single in June 1989 by Fanfare Records and met with success, attaining the top 20 in many countries, including the UK where it reached number four. Later, "Right Back Where We Started From" served as the title cut for a Sinitta retrospective released in 2009.

=== Critical reception ===
Bill Coleman from Billboard concluded that the song "could be the club kitten's biggest hit in the States. Already a smash in the U.K., this bubble-gum, hi-NRG/pop cover of Maxine Nightingale's late '70s hit has smash potential." Pan-European magazine Music & Media stated that the "cheerful" cover "will undoubtedly do well across the Continent." Sylvia Patterson from Smash Hits wrote, "This is hardly a radical interpretation of the original, except that it's a bit faster (due to the Stocks' contribution) and not as well sung (due to Sinitta's). Still, it always was a supreme disco classic and it would take a right duffer to mess this one up." Retrospectively, in a 2023 review of the parent album, the Pop Rescue website called "Right Back Where We Started From" "a wonderfully up-beat and bouncy song from the start" and a "catchy hit".

=== Chart performance ===
"Right Back Where We Started From" was by far the most successful single from the Wicked album. It started at number 19 on the UK Singles Chart on 3 June 1989, reached number four for two weeks and fell off the chart after ten weeks. It achieved silver status, awarded by the British Phonographic Industry. The same month, it peaked at number five in Ireland and appeared on the chart for five weeks. In Continental Europe, it was also a top-five hit in Luxembourg and Finland, peaking at numbers three and four, respectively, a top-15 hit in Denmark and the Flanders region of Belgium, a top-25 hit in West Germany where it charted for 12 weeks, but stalled at number 48 in the Netherlands.

On the overall Eurochart Hot 100 compiled by the Music & Media magazine, it debuted at number 65 on 10 June 1989, peaked at number 15 in its third week and counted 11 weeks on the chart. It had an eight-week chart run on the European Airplay Top 50, with a peak at number eight. Outside Europe, "Right Back Where We Started From" was a hit single in New Zealand and Australia where it reached number two and number seven, respectively; in both countries, it charted for 17 weeks. It received a gold disc, awarded by the Australian Recording Industry Association. It became the singer's only charting single in her native US, reaching number 84 on Billboard's Hot 100 chart and number 48 on the magazine's Hot Dance chart (maxi-single sales).

=== Track listings ===
- 7" single
1. "Right Back Where We Started From" – 3:16
2. "I Just Can't Help It" – 3:43
- 12" single
1. "Right Back Where We Started From" (Left Back on the Side mix) – 7:12
2. "I Just Can't Help It" – 3:43
3. "Right Back Where We Started From" – 3:16

=== Charts ===
==== Weekly charts ====
Weekly chart performance for "Right Back Where We Started From" by Sinitta
Chart (1989)	Peak position
Australia (ARIA)	7
Belgium (Ultratop 50 Flanders)	13
Denmark (IFPI)	12
Europe (Eurochart Hot 100)	15
Europe (European Airplay Top 50)	8
Finland (Suomen virallinen lista)	4
Ireland (IRMA)	5
Luxembourg (Radio Luxembourg)	3
Netherlands (Single Top 100)	48
New Zealand (Recorded Music NZ)	2
Spain (AFYVE)	17
UK Singles (Official Charts)	4
UK Dance (Music Week)	5
US Billboard Hot 100	84
US 12-inch Singles Sales (Billboard)	48
West Germany (GfK)	25

==== Year-end charts ====
1989 year-end chart performance for "Right Back Where We Started From" by Sinitta
Chart (1989)	Position
Australia (ARIA)	44
New Zealand (RIANZ)	38
UK Singles (OCC)	70

=== Certifications ===
Certifications for "Right Back Where We Started From" by Sinitta
Region	Certification	Certified units/sales
Australia (ARIA)	Gold	35,000^{^}
United Kingdom (BPI)	Silver	200,000^{^}
^{^} Shipments figures based on certification alone.

== Other versions ==
- Celly Campello included a Portuguese rendering of the song: "Vamos começar tudo outra vez", on her 1976 eponymous album.
- Anita Sarawak recorded the song for her 1976 album Sophisticated Lady.
- A Dutch rendering: "Jij maakt mij stapelgek", was introduced in 1991 by Flemish singer Sylviane [Coigné]: Bouke remade the song for his 2008 In mijn gedachten album. Another Dutch rendering: "Een, twee, drie", recorded by Bart Kaëll, reached No. 32 on the Dutch charts in Belgium in 1995.
- Marcia Hines' 1996 album Discotheque – composed of covers of classic dance hits – included a remake of "Right Back Where We Started From".
- The 2008 self-titled debut album of indie rock band Army Navy, included a cover of the song as a bonus track.
- In 2012, The Chandler Travis Philharmonic recorded a version for the compilation album Super Hits Of The Seventies, a fundraiser for radio station WFMU.
