= Maxine Nightingale =

British R&B and soul music singer (born 1952)

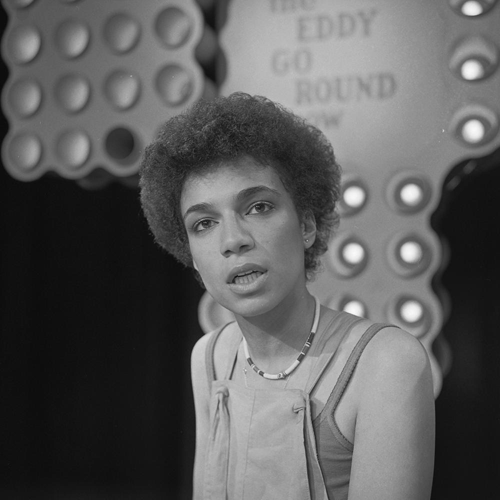
- Nightingale on the Dutch TV programme The Eddy Go Round Show, 1976

Background information
- Born: 2 November 1952 (age 73); Wembley, Middlesex, England
- Genres: R&B; soul; disco
- Occupation: Singer
- Years active: 1968–present
- Labels: Pye; United Artists; Windsong
- Website: www.maxine-nightingale.com

Maxine Nightingale (born 2 November 1952) is a British R&B and soul music singer. She is best known for singing hits in the 1970s, with the million seller "Right Back Where We Started From" (1975, UK No. 8 & 1976, U.S. No. 2), "Love Hit Me" (1977), and "Lead Me On" (1979).

== Early life and career ==
One of the three children of Guyanese-born comedian Benny Nightingale and his wife Iris (they also had daughter Rosalind and son Glenn),^{1} Maxine Nightingale first sang with her school band: she attended Barham Primary (in Wembley, Middlesex), Ealing Grammar School, and the Guildhall School of Music and Drama. When she was thirteen, she and a friend visited a neighbourhood house where Unisound, a band, was rehearsing. They asked her to sing with them; she joined them in performing extensively on the British cabaret circuit. The manager of one of the clubs where they performed asked Nightingale to cut a demo and shipped it to Pye Records. She made her first recordings for them. Although Cyril Stapleton, the label's A&R head, was in charge, Nightingale's three Pye single releases—issued in June and July 1969 and on 26 March 1971—went unnoticed.

In 1969, Nightingale began a tenure of roughly 18 months in the West End production of Hair in London playing a supporting role and understudying the female lead role of Sheila; she relocated to Germany, having formed a relationship with an actor from the German production of Hair whom she had met when he visited the West End production. In Germany, Nightingale continued her stage musical career in Hair (as Sheila), Jesus Christ Superstar, and Godspell She began a relationship with Minoru Terada Domberger, the director of the German production of Hair. They married and had a daughter, Langka Veva Domberger, born in 1973.

== First hit ==
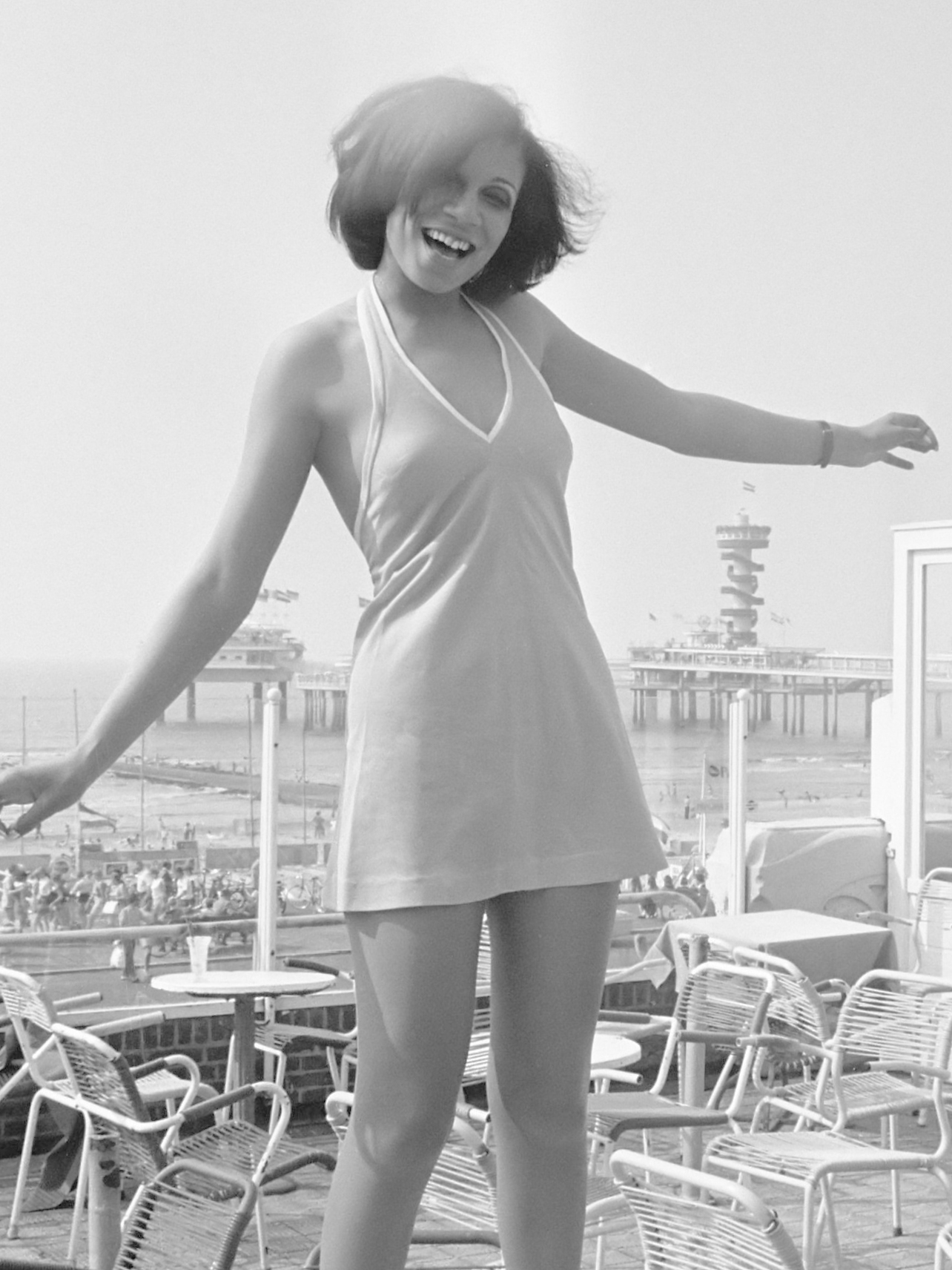
Maxine Nightingale (1969)

Nightingale returned to London with her husband and daughter appearing in the West End production of Savages, after which she withdrew from professional performing. According to Nightingale, "I started doing session singing. I didn't do a lot but it was easy to go out in the evening when the baby was sleeping." Her singing on the recording of Al Matthews' "Fool" caught the attention of the session's producer Pierre Tubbs; he asked composer J. Vincent Edwards, who had worked with Nightingale in the West End production of Hair, to co-write a song for her which became "Right Back Where We Started From". Tubbs asked her to sing on the demo; as she told the story in 2013, "he took it straight to United Artists Records [in London], and they loved it too. They paid me 100 pounds (and after that) they (offered) me an advance and a contract to finish recording the single."

After being released on United Artists Records (in Nightingale's true name), "Right Back Where We Started From" reached No. 8 in the UK in the autumn of 1975. It was released in the US early 1976 to enthusiastic reaction, reaching No. 2 on the Billboard Hot 100 in May 1976. Nightingale, who had accompanied her husband to his native Japan, was motivated by her single's US success to go to London to record an album, Right Back Where We Started From. She went to the US which has since remained her home base. After the song was used in Slap Shot, a hockey comedy 1977 film, NHL teams including the New York Islanders and Toronto Maple Leafs adopted the song as their victory tune played following every win at home.

== Later career ==
Nightingale had some success in the US with "Gotta Be the One". It made it to no. 84 on the Cash Box Singles chart. It also made the New Zealand charts, peaking at no. 19.

Nightingale's only significant UK hit in the period following the success of "Right Back Where We Started From" was with "Love Hit Me," the title cut from her second album. Promoted by Nightingale in a Top of the Pops appearance broadcast 17 March 1977, "Love Hit Me" peaked at No. 11 on the UK chart dated 9 April 1977.

Her third album Love Lines was a 1978 release in the UK and Europe with UK single releases "Lead Me On" and "(Bringing Out) The Girl in Me". Both were overlooked despite her promotion of the latter in another Top of the Pops appearance on 8 June 1978. The US release of "Lead Me On" early in 1979 met with a favorable reception, especially in the easy listening market, and the track reached No. 1 on Billboard's Easy Listening chart that July;^{2} the track gradually accrued enough mainstream pop support to reach No. 5 on the Hot 100 that September. As with "Right Back Where We Started From", she was unable to follow up her US Top Ten success, "(Bringing Out) The Girl in Me" subsequently marking her final Hot 100 appearance peaking at No. 73. Lead Me On is a re-packaged and slightly remixed version of the previous European LP with the addition of a new song, the disco-styled "Hideaway". The songs "Lead Me On" and "Hideaway" were extended for a promotional 12-inch record.

Nightingale reached the top 20 on Billboard's R&B chart for the first time in 1982 with "Turn to Me", a duet with Jimmy Ruffin. She then dropped out of the pop mainstream, working for some 20 years as a more jazz-oriented live performer. She reportedly recorded an album of her live performance at B.B. King's Club at Universal Studios Hollywood although it remains unreleased. Since 2000, she has become active on the retro music circuit, appearing in the 2004 PBS music specials Superstars of Seventies Soul: Live and My Music: 70s Soul Superstars in 2012.

== Discography ==
- Right Back Where We Started From (1976)
- Night Life (1977)
- Love Lines (1979)
- Bittersweet (1980)
- It's a Beautiful Thing (1982) (US:No. 176), (US R&B:No. 35)
- Cry for Love (1986)

== See also ==
- List of disco artists (L-R)
- List of black Britons
- List of performers on Top of the Pops
- List of acts who appeared on American Bandstand
- List of artists who reached number one on the U.S. Adult Contemporary chart

== Notes ==
- 1. Glen (aka Glenn) Nightingale subsequently played guitar in Boy George's band; his session credits include guitar work on recordings by Des'ree, Terence Trent D'Arby, the Gap Band, Jamiroquai and Junior co-writing the last named's "Do You Really (Want My Love)".
- 2. "Lead Me On" was No. 1 Easy Listening 7–21 July 1979; 4–8 August 1979; 1 September 1979.
