= List of Puerto Rican Grammy Award winners and nominees =

The following is a list of Grammy Awards winners and nominees who were born in or trace any ancestry to the archipelago and island of Puerto Rico.

This list is current as of the 68th Grammy Awards ceremony held on February 1, 2026.

== General ==
=== Album of the Year ===
Album of the Year is awarded to a whole album. The recipient of the award is the performing artist, featured artist, songwriter, producer, recording engineer, mixer, and/or mastering engineer for the album.

| Year | Nominees(s) | Work | Result | Ref. |
|---|---|---|---|---|
| 1969 | José Feliciano | Feliciano! | Nominated | |
| 1984 | Irene Cara | Flashdance: Original Soundtrack from the Motion Picture | Nominated | |
| 1996 | David Morales (as producer) | Daydream | Nominated | |
| 2012 | Bruno Mars | Doo-Wops & Hooligans | Nominated | |
| 2018 | Bruno Mars | 24K Magic | Won | |
| 2019 | Tainy (as producer) | Invasion of Privacy | Nominated | |
| 2022 | DVLP (as songwriter) | Justice | Nominated | |
| 2022 | Tito "Earcandy" Vásquez (as engineer/mixer) | Back of My Mind | Nominated | |
| 2022 | Nickie Jon Pabón (as engineer/mixer) | Montero | Nominated | |
| 2023 | Bad Bunny and List: Rauw Alejandro, Buscabulla, Chencho Corleone, Jhay Cortez, Tony Dize, and The Marías (as featured artists and songwriters); and Elikai, Haze, La Paciencia, Cheo Legendary, Mag, Mora, Jota Rosa, Subelo Neo, and Tainy (as producers and engineers/mixers) | Un Verano Sin Ti | Nominated | |
| 2026 | Bad Bunny and List: Chuwi, Dei V, Los Pleneros de la Cresta, Omar Courtz, and RaiNao (as featured artists), Los Sopranos and various others (as musicians), Big Jay, La Paciencia, Mag, and Tainy (as producers and songwriters), and Antonio Caraballo, Luis Amed Irizarry and various others (as engineers/mixers) | Debí Tirar Más Fotos | Won | |

=== Record of the Year ===
Record of the Year is awarded to a single song. The recipient of the award is the performing artist, producer, recording engineer, mixer, and/or mastering engineer for the song.

| Year | Nominees(s) | Work | Result | Ref. |
|---|---|---|---|---|
| 1984 | Irene Cara | "Flashdance... What a Feeling" | Nominated | |
| 2000 | Ricky Martin and Robi Rosa (as producer) | "Livin' la Vida Loca" | Nominated | |
| 2012 | Bruno Mars | "Grenade" | Nominated | |
| 2014 | Bruno Mars | "Locked Out of Heaven" | Nominated | |
| 2016 | Bruno Mars | "Uptown Funk" | Won | |
| 2018 | Bruno Mars | "24K Magic" | Won | |
| 2018 | Luis Fonsi, Daddy Yankee, and Gaby Music (as engineer/mixer) | "Despacito" | Nominated | |
| 2019 | Bad Bunny, Tainy (as producer), and Simone Torres (as engineer/mixer) | "I Like It" | Nominated | |
| 2019 | Lorenzo Cardona (as engineer/mixer) | "Rockstar" | Nominated | |
| 2022 | Bruno Mars | "Leave the Door Open" | Won | |
| 2026 | Bruno Mars | "APT." | Nominated | |
| 2026 | Bad Bunny, La Paciencia and Hydra Hitz (as producers and engineers/mixers), and Antonio Caraballo (as engineer/mixer) | "DTMF" | Nominated | |

=== Song of the Year ===
Song of the Year is awarded for a single song. The recipient of the award is the songwriter who wrote the lyrics and/or melodies to the song.

| Year | Nominees(s) | Work | Result | Ref. |
|---|---|---|---|---|
| 2000 | Robi Rosa | "Livin' la Vida Loca" | Nominated | |
| 2004 | Jorge Calderón | "Keep Me In Your Heart" | Nominated | |
| 2004 | Luis Resto | "Lose Yourself" | Nominated | |
| 2011 | Bruno Mars | "F**k You" | Nominated | |
| 2012 | Bruno Mars | "Grenade" | Nominated | |
| 2014 | Bruno Mars | "Locked Out of Heaven" | Nominated | |
| 2018 | Bruno Mars | "That's What I Like" | Won | |
| 2018 | Daddy Yankee and Luis Fonsi | "Despacito" | Nominated | |
| 2022 | Bruno Mars | "Leave the Door Open" | Won | |
| 2025 | Bruno Mars | "Die with a Smile" | Nominated | |
| 2026 | Bad Bunny, La Paciencia, Mag, and Hugo René Sención Sanabria | "DTMF" | Nominated | |

=== Best New Artist ===
Best New Artist is awarded to an artist who achieves a breakthrough which establishes the public identity of the artist.

| Year | Nominees(s) | Result | Ref. |
|---|---|---|---|
| 1969 | José Feliciano | Won | |
| 1981 | Irene Cara | Nominated | |
| 2026 | The Marías (lead vocalist María Zardoya) | Nominated | |

== Pop and Dance/Electronic ==
=== Best Pop Solo Performance ===
| Year | Nominees(s) | Work | Result | Ref. |
|---|---|---|---|---|
| 2012 | Bruno Mars | "Grenade" | Nominated | |
| 2014 | Bruno Mars | "When I Was Your Man" | Nominated | |
| 2023 | Bad Bunny | "Moscow Mule" | Nominated | |

=== Best Pop Duo/Group Performance ===
| Year | Nominees(s) | Work | Result | Ref. |
|---|---|---|---|---|
| 2016 | Bruno Mars | "Uptown Funk" | Won | |
| 2018 | Luis Fonsi and Daddy Yankee | "Despacito" | Nominated | |
| 2021 | Bad Bunny | "Un Día (One Day)" | Nominated | |
| 2025 | Bruno Mars | "Die with a Smile" | Nominated | |
| 2026 | Bruno Mars | "APT." | Nominated | |

=== Best Pop Vocal Album ===
| Year | Nominees(s) | Work | Result | Ref. |
|---|---|---|---|---|
| 2000 | Ricky Martin | Ricky Martin | Nominated | |
| 2012 | Bruno Mars | Doo-Wops & Hooligans | Nominated | |
| 2014 | Bruno Mars | Unorthodox Jukebox | Won | |

=== Best Dance Pop Recording ===
| Year | Nominees(s) | Work | Result | Ref. |
|---|---|---|---|---|
| 2026 | Nickie Jon Pabón (as engineer/mixer) | "Illegal" | Nominated | |

=== Best Dance/Electronic Recording ===
| Year | Nominees(s) | Work | Result | Ref. |
|---|---|---|---|---|
| 2000 | Hex Hector (as producer) | "I Will Go with You" | Nominated | |
| 2000 | Jennifer Lopez | "Waiting for Tonight" | Nominated | |
| 2001 | Jennifer Lopez | "Let's Get Loud" | Nominated | |

=== Best Dance/Electronic Album ===
| Year | Nominees(s) | Work | Result | Ref. |
|---|---|---|---|---|
| 2017 | Louie Vega | Louie Vega Starring...XXVIII | Nominated | |

=== Best Remixed Recording, Non-Classical ===
| Year | Nominees(s) | Work | Result | Ref. |
|---|---|---|---|---|
| 1997 | David Morales | —N/a (Note: Title of nominated work is not available.) | Nominated | |
| 1999 | David Morales | "My All (Classic and Club mixes)" | Won | |
| 1999 | Masters at Work | —N/a | Nominated | |
| 2000 | Masters at Work | —N/a | Nominated | |
| 2000 | Hex Hector | —N/a | Nominated | |
| 2001 | Hex Hector | "I Turn To You (Hex Hector Mix)" | Won | |
| 2004 | Masters at Work | "Lei Lo Lai (MAW Mix)" | Nominated | |
| 2006 | Louie Vega | "Superfly Louie Vega EOL Mix)" | Won | |
| 2010 | Dennis Ferrer | "Don't Believe in Love (Dennis Ferrer Objektivity Mix)" | Nominated | |
| 2012 | Ralphi Rosario | "Only Girl (In the World) (Rosabel Club Mix)" | Nominated | |
| 2018 | Louie Vega | "Can't Let You Go (Louie Vega Roots Mix)" | Nominated | |
| 2021 | Louie Vega | "Praying For You (Louie Vega Main Mix)" | Nominated | |

== Rock, Metal, and Alternative ==
=== Best Rock Song ===
| Year | Nominees(s) | Work | Result | Ref. |
|---|---|---|---|---|
| 2004 | Jorge Calderón | "Disorder in the House" | Nominated | |

== R&B, Rap, and Spoken Word Poetry ==
=== Best R&B Performance ===
| Year | Nominees(s) | Work | Result | Ref. |
|---|---|---|---|---|
| 2018 | Bruno Mars | "That's What I Like" | Won | |
| 2022 | Silk Sonic (band member Bruno Mars) | "Leave the Door Open" | Won | |

=== Best R&B Song ===
| Year | Nominees(s) | Work | Result | Ref. |
|---|---|---|---|---|
| 2001 | Robi Rosa | "Thong Song" | Nominated | |
| 2016 | Gina Figueroa | "Really Love" | Won | |
| 2018 | Bruno Mars | "That's What I Like" | Won | |
| 2022 | Silk Sonic (band member Bruno Mars) | "Leave the Door Open" | Won | |
| 2026 | Ephrem Louis Lopez Jr. | "It Depends" | Nominated | |

=== Best Rap Performance ===
| Year | Nominees(s) | Work | Result | Ref. |
|---|---|---|---|---|
| 2017 | Fat Joe | "All the Way Up" | Nominated | |

=== Best Melodic Rap Performance ===
Best Melodic Rap Performance is awarded to a single song. The recipient of the award is the performing artist.

| Year | Nominees(s) | Work | Result | Ref. |
|---|---|---|---|---|
| 2003 | Fat Joe | "What's Luv?" | Nominated | |
| 2011 | Bruno Mars | "Nothin' on You" | Nominated | |

=== Best Rap Song ===
Best Rap Song is awarded to a single song. The recipient of the award is the songwriter.

| Year | Nominees(s) | Work | Result | Ref. |
|---|---|---|---|---|
| 2004 | Luis Resto | "Lose Yourself" | Won | |
| 2011 | Luis Resto | "Not Afraid" | Nominated | |
| 2011 | Bruno Mars | "Nothin' on You" | Nominated | |
| 2013 | Bruno Mars | "Young, Wild & Free" | Nominated | |
| 2017 | Fat Joe | "All the Way Up" | Nominated | |
| 2018 | Héctor Delgado | "Chase Me" | Nominated | |
| 2024 | Ephrem Louis Lopez Jr. | "Barbie World" | Nominated | |

=== Best Rap Album ===
Best Rap Album is awarded to a whole album. The recipient of the award is the performing artist, featured artist, producer, engineer, and/or mixer.

| Year | Nominees(s) | Work | Result | Ref. |
|---|---|---|---|---|
| 1999 | Big Pun | Capital Punishment | Nominated | |

== Jazz, Traditional Pop, Contemporary Instrumental, and Musical Theater ==
=== Best Jazz Performance ===
Best Jazz Performance is awarded to a single song. The recipient of the award is the performing artist.

| Year | Nominees(s) | Work | Result | Ref. |
|---|---|---|---|---|
| 2010 | Miguel Zenón | "Villa Palmeras" | Nominated | |
| 2019 | Miguel Zenón | "Cadenas" | Nominated | |

=== Best Jazz Instrumental Album ===
| Year | Nominees(s) | Work | Result | Ref. |
|---|---|---|---|---|
| 1969 | Eddie Gómez (trio member [as bassist]) | Bill Evans at the Montreux Jazz Festival | Won | |
| 1970 | Eddie Gómez (trio member [as bassist]) | What's New | Nominated | |
| 1972 | Eddie Gómez (trio member [as bassist]) | The Bill Evans Album | Won | |
| 1975 | Eddie Gómez (trio member [as bassist]) | The Tokyo Concert | Nominated | |
| 1977 | Eddie Gómez (trio member [as bassist]) | Since We Met | Nominated | |
| 1977 | Eddie Gómez (as bassist) | The Leprechaun | Won | |
| 1979 | Eddie Gómez (as bassist) | Friends | Won | |
| 2013 | Eddie Gómez | Further Explorations | Nominated | |

=== Best Large Jazz Ensemble Album ===
| Year | Nominees(s) | Work | Result | Ref. |
|---|---|---|---|---|
| 2005 | David Sánchez | Coral | Nominated | |
| 2012 | Miguel Zenón | Alma Adentro: The Puerto Rican Songbook | Nominated | |
| 2023 | Eddie Gómez | Center Stage | Nominated | |
| 2025 | Miguel Zenón | Golden City | Nominated | |

=== Best Latin Jazz Album ===
| Year | Nominees(s) | Work | Result | Ref. |
|---|---|---|---|---|
| 1995 | List: Cheito Quiñones (as vocalist), Dave Valentin (as flutist), Eddie "Guagua" Rivera (as bassist), and Giovanni Hidalgo (as percussionist) | Danzón (Dance On) | Won | |
| 1995 | Jerry González | Crossroads | Nominated | |
| 1995 | Eddie Palmieri | Palmas | Nominated | |
| 1995 | Ray Barretto | Taboo | Nominated | |
| 1996 | Eddie Palmieri | Arete | Nominated | |
| 1996 | Jerry González | Pensativo | Nominated | |
| 1997 | Steve Berrios | And Then Some! | Nominated | |
| 1997 | Ray Barretto | My Summertime | Nominated | |
| 1998 | List: David Sánchez (as saxophonist) and John Benitez (as bassist) | Habana | Won | |
| 1998 | Giovanni Hidalgo | Hands of Rhythm | Nominated | |
| 1999 | List: Edwin Bonilla (as percussionist), Tito Puente (as timbalero) | Hot House | Won | |
| 1999 | Ray Barretto | Contact | Nominated | |
| 1999 | David Sánchez | Obsession | Nominated | |
| 2000 | List: José "Papo" Rodríguez (as percussionist), Tito Rodríguez and Willie Bobo (as composers) | Latin Soul | Won | |
| 2000 | Bobby Rodríguez | Latin Jazz Explosion | Nominated | |
| 2001 | Bobby Sanabria | Afro-Cuban Dream... Live & in Clave | Nominated | |
| 2001 | David Sánchez (Note: As saxophonist for Nocturne.) | Melaza | Nominated | |
| 2002 | David Sánchez | Nocturne | Won | |
| 2002 | David Sánchez | Travesía | Nominated | |
| 2002 | Carlos Henriquez | Supernova | Nominated | |
| 2003 | Dave Valentin | The Gathering | Won | |
| 2003 | List: Ray Vega (as trumpeter) and Rubén Rodríguez (as bassist) | Birds Of A Feather | Nominated | |
| 2003 | John Santos | S.F. Bay | Nominated | |
| 2005 | List: Miguel Zenón (as saxophonist) | Land of the Sun | Won | |
| 2005 | List: Dave Valentin (as flutist), Edsel Gómez (as pianist), John Benitez (as bassist), and Ritchie Flores (as percussionist) | Another Kind of Blue: The Latin Side of Miles Davis | Nominated | |
| 2005 | Jerry González | Jerry Gonzalez y los Piratas del Flamenco | Nominated | |
| 2006 | Eddie Palmieri | Listen Here! | Won | |
| 2006 | Sammy Figueroa | ...And Sammy Walked In | Nominated | |
| 2006 | Ray Barretto | Time Was – Time Is | Nominated | |
| 2007 | Eddie Palmieri | Simpático | Won | |
| 2007 | Edsel Gómez | Cubist Music | Nominated | |
| 2008 | Bobby Sanabria | Big Band Urban Folktales | Nominated | |
| 2008 | Sammy Figueroa | The Magician | Nominated | |
| 2009 | List: Juan Tizol and Tito Puente (as composers), Papo Vázquez and José Madera (as arrangers), Tony Rosa (as conguero), and Rubén Rodríguez (as bassist) | Song for Chico | Won | |
| 2009 | Papo Vázquez | Marooned/Aislado | Nominated | |
| 2009 | Nestor Torres | Nouveau Latino | Nominated | |
| 2009 | List: Eddie Palmieri (as pianist) and Rubén Rodríguez (as bassist) | The Latin Side of Wayne Shorter | Nominated | |
| 2010 | Miguel Zenón | Esta Plena | Nominated | |
| 2010 | Chembo Corniel | Things I Wanted to Do | Nominated | |
| 2013 | List: Carlos Henriquez (as bassist) | Impromptu | Nominated | |
| 2013 | Bobby Sanabria | Multiverse | Nominated | |
| 2013 | List: John Benitez (as bassist) | New Cuban Express | Nominated | |
| 2015 | List: Christopher "Chilo" Cajigas (as spoken word vocalist), Ivan Renta (as saxophonist), and Joe Rodríguez (as percussionist) | The Offense of the Drum | Won | |
| 2016 | Miguel Zenón | Identities Are Changeable | Nominated | |
| 2017 | Andy González | Entre Colegas | Nominated | |
| 2018 | Miguel Zenón | Típico | Nominated | |
| 2019 | Bobby Sanabria | West Side Story Reimagined | Nominated | |
| 2019 | Miguel Zenón | Yo Soy La Tradición | Nominated | |
| 2020 | David Sánchez | Carib | Nominated | |
| 2020 | Miguel Zenón | Sonero: The Music of Ismael Rivera | Nominated | |
| 2021 | List: Carlos "Carly" Maldonado (as percussionist) and Ivan Renta (as saxophonist) | Four Questions | Won | |
| 2022 | Miguel Zenón | El Arte Del Bolero | Nominated | |
| 2022 | Carlos Henriquez | The South Bronx Story | Nominated | |
| 2022 | List: Jóse Madera (as arranger), Papo Vázquez and Tito Puente (as composers), Carlos "Carly" Maldonado (as percussionist), and Ivan Renta (as saxophonist) | Virtual Birdland | Nominated | |
| 2023 | List: Carlos "Carly" Maldonado (as percussionist) and Ivan Renta (as saxophonist) | Fandango at the Wall in New York | Won | |
| 2023 | Miguel Zenón | Música de las Américas | Nominated | |
| 2024 | Miguel Zenón | El Arte del Bolero Vol. 2 | Won | |
| 2024 | Bobby Sanabria | Vox Humana | Nominated | |
| 2025 | Zaccai Curtis and List: Luques Curtis (as bassist) Willie Martínez (as timbalero), Camilo Molina (as conguero), and Reinaldo de Jesus (as bongosero) | Cubop Lives! | Won | |
| 2026 | List: Carlos "Carly" Maldonado (as percussionist), Ivan Renta (as saxophonist), and Ricardo Rodríguez (as bassist) | Mundoagua – Celebrating Carla Bley | Nominated | |
| 2026 | Miguel Zenón | Vanguardia Subterránea: Live at The Village Vanguard | Nominated | |

=== Best Contemporary Instrumental Album ===
| Year | Nominees(s) | Work | Result | Ref. |
|---|---|---|---|---|
| 2008 | Marc Quiñones (as conguero) | Good to Go-Go | Nominated | |
| 2010 | Gerardo Velez and Marc Quiñones (as percussionists) | Down the Wire | Nominated | |

=== Best Musical Theater Album ===
| Year | Nominees(s) | Work | Result | Ref. |
|---|---|---|---|---|
| 2009 | Lin-Manuel Miranda | In the Heights | Won | |
| 2016 | Lin-Manuel Miranda and Anthony Ramos (as principal vocalist) | Hamilton | Won | |

== Gospel and Contemporary Christian ==
=== Best Contemporary Christian Music Performance/Song ===
| Year | Nominees(s) | Work | Result | Ref. |
|---|---|---|---|---|
| 2015 | David Garcia (as songwriter) | "Write Your Story" | Nominated | |
| 2015 | David Garcia (as songwriter) | "Shake" | Nominated | |
| 2016 | David Garcia (as songwriter) | "Feel It" | Nominated | |
| 2018 | David Garcia (as songwriter) | "Even If" | Nominated | |
| 2019 | David Garcia (as songwriter) | "Grace Got You" | Nominated | |

=== Best Contemporary Christian Music Album ===
| Year | Nominees(s) | Work | Result | Ref. |
|---|---|---|---|---|
| 2012 | David Garcia (as producer) | What If We Were Real | Nominated | |
| 2013 | David Garcia (as producer) | Eye on It | Won | |
| 2013 | David Garcia (as producer) | Gold | Nominated | |
| 2014 | David Garcia (as producer) | Overcomer | Won | |
| 2015 | David Garcia (as producer) | If We're Honest | Nominated | |
| 2015 | David Garcia (as producer) | Welcome to the New | Nominated | |
| 2016 | David Garcia (as producer) | This Is Not a Test | Won | |
| 2017 | David Garcia (as producer) | American Prodigal | Nominated | |
| 2018 | David Garcia (as producer) | Lifer | Nominated | |
| 2020 | David Garcia (as producer) | The Elements | Nominated | |

=== Best Roots Gospel Album ===
| Year | Nominees(s) | Work | Result | Ref. |
|---|---|---|---|---|
| 2022 | David Garcia (as producer) | My Savior | Won | |

== Latin, Global, Reggae, and New Age, Ambient, or Chant ==
=== Best Latin Pop Album ===
| Year | Nominees(s) | Work | Result | Ref. |
|---|---|---|---|---|
| 1984 | José Feliciano | Me Enamoré | Won | |
| 1984 | Menudo | Una aventura llamada Menudo | Nominated | |
| 1985 | José Feliciano | Como Tu Quieres | Nominated | |
| 1985 | Menudo | Evolución | Nominated | |
| 1985 | Johnny Lozada | Invítame | Nominated | |
| 1986 | José Feliciano (Note: As featured artist for Es Fácil Amar.) | Es Fácil Amar | Won | |
| 1986 | José Feliciano | "Por Ella" | Nominated | |
| 1986 | José Feliciano | Ya Soy Tuyo | Nominated | |
| 1987 | José Feliciano | "Le Lo Lai" | Won | |
| 1987 | Danny Rivera | Inolvidable Tito... A Mi Me Pasa lo Mismo que a Usted | Nominated | |
| 1988 | Danny Rivera | Amar o Morir | Nominated | |
| 1988 | Yolandita Monge | Laberinto de Amor | Nominated | |
| 1988 | Lunna | Lunna | Nominated | |
| 1988 | Luis Miguel | Soy Como Quiero Ser | Nominated | |
| 1990 | José Feliciano | "Cielito Lindo" | Won | |
| 1990 | Chayanne | Chayanne | Nominated | |
| 1991 | José Feliciano | "¿Por Qué Te Tengo Que Olvidar?" | Won | |
| 1991 | Luis Miguel | 20 Años | Nominated | |
| 1993 | Luis Miguel | Romance | Nominated | |
| 1994 | Luis Miguel | Aries | Won | |
| 1994 | José Feliciano | Latin Street '92 | Nominated | |
| 1995 | Luis Miguel | Segundo Romance | Won | |
| 1996 | List: Edwin Bonilla (as percussionist) and Néstor Torres (as flutist) | Amor | Won | |
| 1997 | José Feliciano | Americano | Nominated | |
| 1997 | Luis Miguel | Nada Es Igual… | Nominated | |
| 1998 | Luis Miguel | Romances | Won | |
| 1999 | Ricky Martin | Vuelve | Won | |
| 1999 | Chayanne | Atado a Tu Amor | Nominated | |
| 1999 | José Feliciano | Señor Bolero | Nominated | |
| 2000 | Luis Miguel | Amarte Es Un Placer | Nominated | |
| 2000 | List: Edwin Bonilla (as percussionist) | Ni Es lo Mismo Ni Es Igual | Nominated | |
| 2001 | List: Luis Fonsi and Sergio George (as featured artists and/or producers) | Mi Reflejo | Nominated | |
| 2001 | Luis Miguel | Vivo | Nominated | |
| 2002 | List: Pedro Flores (as songwriter) | La Música de Baldemar Huerta | Won | |
| 2002 | Chayanne | Simplemente | Nominated | |
| 2003 | List: Sergio George (as producer) | Caraluna | Won | |
| 2004 | Chayanne | Sincero | Nominated | |
| 2004 | Luis Miguel | 33 | Nominated | |
| 2005 | Marc Anthony | Amar Sin Mentiras | Won | |
| 2005 | List: Sergio George (as producer) | Pau-Latina | Nominated | |
| 2007 | List: Tommy Torres (as producer) | Adentro | Won | |
| 2007 | Obie Bermúdez | Lo Que Trajo el Barco | Nominated | |
| 2008 | List: Calle 13 (as featured artist) | El Tren de los Momentos | Won | |
| 2008 | List: Ricky Martin (as featured artist) | Papito | Nominated | |
| 2008 | Luis Miguel | Navidades | Nominated | |
| 2009 | Luis Miguel | Cómplices | Nominated | |
| 2009 | Luis Fonsi | Palabras del Silencio | Nominated | |
| 2009 | Tommy Torres | Tarde o Temprano | Nominated | |
| 2010 | List: Marc Anthony (as featured artist) | Sin Frenos | Won | |
| 2010 | List: Tommy Torres (as producer) | 5to Piso | Nominated | |
| 2011 | List: Tommy Torres (as producer) | Paraíso Express | Won | |
| 2011 | Kany García | Boleto de Entrada | Nominated | |
| 2013 | Kany García | Kany Garcia | Nominated | |
| 2013 | List: Tommy Torres (as producer and/or songwriter) | ¿Con Quién Se Queda el Perro? | Nominated | |
| 2013 | List: Tommy Torres (as producer and/or songwriter) | Independiente | Nominated | |
| 2014 | Draco Rosa | Vida | Won | |
| 2014 | Tommy Torres | 12 Historias | Nominated | |
| 2015 | List: Raquel Sofía (as songwriter) | Loco de Amor | Nominated | |
| 2016 | Ricky Martin (Note: As featured artist for Terral.) | A Quien Quiera Escuchar | Won | |
| 2016 | Ricky Martin | Terral | Nominated | |
| 2017 | List: Tommy Torres (as featured artist and/or songwriter) | Un Besito Más | Won | |
| 2018 | List: Nicky Jam (as featured artist and/or songwriter) | El Dorado | Won | |
| 2019 | Raquel Sofía | 2 A.M. | Nominated | |
| 2020 | List: Nicky Jam and Residente (as featured artists and/or songwriters) | El Disco | Won | |
| 2020 | List: Chencho Corleone, DJ Luian, Mambo Kingz, Nicky Jam, Ozuna, Ricky Martin, Tainy, and Zion & Lennox (as featured artists, producers, and/or songwriters) | 11:11 | Nominated | |
| 2020 | List: Tommy Torres (as featured artist and/or songwriter) | Fantasía | Nominated | |
| 2020 | Luis Fonsi | Vida | Nominated | |
| 2021 | Bad Bunny | YHLQMDLG | Won | |
| 2021 | Kany García | Mesa Para Dos | Nominated | |
| 2021 | Ricky Martin | Pausa | Nominated | |
| 2022 | List: Tainy (as producer and/or songwriter) | Mis Manos | Nominated | |
| 2022 | List: Gale, Myke Towers, Tainy, Rauw Alejandro, and Zabdiel (as featured artists, producers, and/or songwriters) | Revelación | Nominated | |
| 2023 | List: Álvaro Díaz, Daddy Yankee, Guaynaa, Justin Quiles, Lenny Tavárez, Mariah Angeliq, Myke Towers, and Rauw Alejandro (as featured artists and/or songwriters) | Dharma | Nominated | |
| 2024 | List: Anuel AA, DJ Luian, Don Omar, Jhayco, Jowell & Randy, Justin Quiles, Lenny Tavárez, Mambo Kingz, Marc Anthony, Sergio George, and Yandel (as featured artists, producers, and/or songwriters) | Don Juan | Nominated | |
| 2024 | Pedro Capó | La Neta | Nominated | |
| 2025 | List: Gale, Ozuna, Rauw Alejandro, and Tainy (as featured artists and/or songwriters) | Las Mujeres Ya No Lloran | Won | |
| 2025 | Luis Fonsi | El Viaje | Nominated | |
| 2025 | Kany García | García | Nominated | |
| 2025 | List: Jean Rodríguez, Rauw Alejandro, and Tainy (as featured artists, producers, and/or songwriters) | Orquídeas | Nominated | |
| 2026 | Rauw Alejandro | Cosa Nuestra | Nominated | |
| 2026 | List: Eliel, Daddy Yankee, N.O.R.E, Mariah Angeliq, Nina Sky, and Tainy (as featured artists, producers, and/or songwriters) | Tropicoqueta | Nominated | |

=== Best Música Urbana Album ===
| Year | Nominees(s) | Work | Result | Ref. |
|---|---|---|---|---|
| 2022 | Bad Bunny | El Último Tour Del Mundo | Won | |
| 2022 | Rauw Alejandro | Afrodisíaco | Nominated | |
| 2022 | List: Bad Bunny, Jay Wheeler, Jhayco, Justin Quiles, Myke Towers, Nicky Jam, Ozuna, Tainy, Yandel, and Zion & Lennox (as featured artists and/or songwriters) | Jose | Nominated | |
| 2022 | List: Alberto Stylee, Anuel AA, Chencho Corleone, DJ Nelson, Ivy Queen, Justin Quiles, Lenny Tavárez, Mariah Angeliq, Nicky Jam, Ozuna, Wisin & Yandel, and Zion (as featured artists, producers, and/or songwriters) | KG0516 | Nominated | |
| 2022 | List: Jhayco, Jowell & Randy, Rico Nasty, and Tainy (as featured artists, producers, and/or songwriters) | Sin Miedo (del Amor y Otros Demonios) | Nominated | |
| 2023 | Bad Bunny | Un Verano Sin Ti | Won | |
| 2023 | Farruko | La 167 | Nominated | |
| 2023 | Daddy Yankee | Leyendaddy | Nominated | |
| 2023 | Rauw Alejandro | Trap Cake, Vol. 2 | Nominated | |
| 2023 | List: Arcángel, Anuel AA, Chencho Corleone, Dalex, De la Ghetto, DJ Nelson, Jay Wheeler, Justin Quiles, and Lenny Tavárez (as featured artists and/or songwriters) | The Love & Sex Tape | Nominated | |
| 2024 | List: Justin Quiles, Lenny Tavárez, Maldy, and Tainy (as featured artists, producers, and/or songwriters) | Mañana Será Bonito | Won | |
| 2024 | Tainy | Data | Nominated | |
| 2024 | Rauw Alejandro | Saturno | Nominated | |
| 2025 | Residente | Las Letras Ya No Importan | Won | |
| 2025 | Young Miko (Note: As featured artist for Ferxxocalipsis.) | Att. | Nominated | |
| 2025 | Young Miko | Ferxxocalipsis | Nominated | |
| 2025 | Bad Bunny | Nadie Sabe Lo Que Va a Pasar Mañana | Nominated | |
| 2025 | List: Chencho Corleone, Dei V, DJ Luian, Luar la L, Mambo Kingz, Omar Courtz, and Zion (as featured artists and/or songwriters) | Rayo | Nominated | |
| 2026 | Bad Bunny | Debí Tirar Más Fotos | Won | |
| 2026 | List: Wisin (as featured artist and/or songwriter) | Ferxxo Vol X: Sagrado | Nominated | |
| 2026 | List: Gilberto Santa Rosa, Jay Wheeler, Justin Quiles, and Lenny Tavárez (as featured artists and/or songwriters) | Mixteip | Nominated | |
| 2026 | Yandel | Sinfónico — En Vivo | Nominated | |

=== Best Latin Rock or Alternative Album ===
| Year | Nominees(s) | Work | Result | Ref. |
|---|---|---|---|---|
| 2005 | List: Eddie Palmieri (as pianist and songwriter) | Street Signs | Won | |
| 2006 | La Secta AllStar | Consejo | Nominated | |
| 2006 | Vico C | Desahogo | Nominated | |
| 2007 | Tego Calderón | The Underdog/El Subestimado | Nominated | |
| 2007 | Calle 13 | Calle 13 | Nominated | |
| 2007 | Black Guayaba | Lo Demás es Plástico | Nominated | |
| 2008 | Black Guayaba | No Hay Espacio | Won | |
| 2010 | Calle 13 | Los de Atrás Vienen Conmigo | Won | |
| 2010 | Wisin & Yandel | La Revolución | Nominated | |
| 2011 | Draco | Amor Vincit Omnia | Nominated | |
| 2015 | Calle 13 | Multi_Viral | Won | |
| 2016 | List: Farruko, Ricky Martin, Wisin, and Yandel (as featured artists and/or songwriters) | Dale | Won | |
| 2017 | iLe | iLevitable | Won | |
| 2018 | Residente | Residente | Won | |
| 2020 | iLe | Almadura | Nominated | |
| 2020 | Bad Bunny | Oasis | Nominated | |
| 2020 | Bad Bunny | X 100pre | Nominated | |
| 2021 | Cultura Profética | Sobrevolando | Nominated | |
| 2022 | List: Benito de Jesús (as songwriters) | Origen | Won | |
| 2023 | List: Jean Rodríguez, Justin Quiles, Rauw Alejandro, Tainy, and Wisin (as producers and/or songwriters) | Motomami | Won | |
| 2024 | List: Gale and Tommy Torres (as songwriters) | Vida Cotidiana | Won | |
| 2024 | Eduardo Cabra (Note: As songwriter for ¿Quién Trae las Cornetas?.) | Martínez | Nominated | |
| 2025 | Eduardo Cabra | ¿Quién Trae las Cornetas? | Won | |

=== Best Tropical Latin Album ===
| Year | Nominees(s) | Work | Result | Ref. |
|---|---|---|---|---|
| 1984 | Tito Puente | On Broadway | Won | |
| 1984 | Willie Colón | Corazón Guerrero | Nominated | |
| 1984 | Ray Barretto and Adalberto Santiago | Tremendo Trío | Nominated | |
| 1985 | Eddie Palmieri | Palo Pa' Rumba | Won | |
| 1985 | Willie Colón | Criollo | Nominated | |
| 1985 | El Gran Combo de Puerto Rico | In Alaska: Breaking the Ice | Nominated | |
| 1986 | Eddie Palmieri | Solito | Won | |
| 1987 | Seis del Solar List: Eddie Montalvo (as percussionist and chorist), Louie Rivera and Ralph Irizarry (as percussionists), Mike Viñas (as bassist), Oscar Hernández (as pianist and synthesizer), and Ricardo Marrero (as pianist, synthesizer, and percussionist) | Escenas | Won | |
| 1987 | Willie Colón | Especial No. 5 | Nominated | |
| 1987 | Tito Puente | Homenaje a Beny Moré, Vol. 3 | Nominated | |
| 1987 | Willie Rosario | Nueva Cosecha | Nominated | |
| 1988 | Eddie Palmieri | La Verdad – The Truth | Won | |
| 1988 | Seis del Solar List: Bobby Allende, Edgardo Rivera, and Ralph Irizarry (as percussionists), Mike Viñas (as bassist and arranger), Oscar Hernández (as pianist and synthesizer), Ricardo Marrero (as synthesizer), and Tito Allen (as chorist) | Agua de Luna | Nominated | |
| 1988 | Ray Barretto | Aquí Se Puede | Nominated | |
| 1988 | Héctor Lavoe | Strikes Back | Nominated | |
| 1988 | Willie Colón | The Winners | Nominated | |
| 1989 | Son del Solar List: Bobby Allende, Marc Quiñones, and Ralph Irizarry (as percussionists), Mike Viñas (as bassist and arranger), Néstor Sánchez and Tito Allen (as chorists), Oscar Hernández (as pianist, synthesizer, and arranger), and Papo Vázquez and Reynaldo Jorge (as trombonists) | Antecedente | Won | |
| 1989 | Pete "El Conde" Rodríguez | Salsobita | Nominated | |
| 1989 | Eddie Santiago | Sigo Atrevido | Nominated | |
| 1990 | Ray Barretto | Ritmo en el Corazón | Won | |
| 1990 | Eddie Palmieri | Azúcar | Nominated | |
| 1990 | Ray Barretto | Irresistible | Nominated | |
| 1990 | Willie Colón | Secrets/Altos Secretos | Nominated | |
| 1991 | Tito Puente | Lambada Timbales | Won | |
| 1991 | Willie Colón | Color Americano | Nominated | |
| 1991 | Tito Puente | Tito Puente presents Millie P. | Nominated | |
| 1992 | Tito Puente | The Mambo King 100th LP | Nominated | |
| 1992 | Son del Solar List: Arturo Ortiz (as synthesizer), Eddie Montalvo, Ralph Irizarry, and Ray Colón (as percussionists), Mike Viñas (as bassist and arranger), Tito Allen (as chorist), Oscar Hernández (as pianist, synthesizer and arranger), and Papo Vázquez and Reynaldo Jorge (as trombonists) | Caminando | Nominated | |
| 1993 | List: Tito Allen, Yayo Peguero, and Adalberto Santiago (as chorists), and Ray Santos Orchestra (including Ray Santos [arranger] and Yomo Toro [tresero]) | Frenesí | Won | |
| 1993 | Son del Solar List: Arturo Ortiz (as synthesizer and arranger), Eddie Montalvo, George González, Sammy Figueroa and Ralph Irizarry (as percussionists), Mike Viñas (as bassist and arranger), Néstor Sánchez and Tito Allen (as chorists), Oscar Hernández (as pianist, synthesizer and arranger), Papo Gely (as cuatrista), and Papo Vázquez and Reynaldo Jorge (as trombonists) | Amor y Control | Nominated | |
| 1993 | El Gran Combo de Puerto Rico | Gracias | Nominated | |
| 1993 | Ray Barretto | Soy Dichoso | Nominated | |
| 1994 | List: Cheito Quiñones (as chorist and trumpeter), Nelson González (as bassist, percussionist, and tresero), Néstor Torres (as flutist), and Tito Puente (as timbalero) | Mi Tierra | Won | |
| 1994 | List: Cheito Quiñones and Tito Nieves (as chorists), Cucco Peña and Johnny Ortiz (as songwriters), Luis Aquino (as trumpeter), Eddie Torres, Papo Pepín, and Sammy Pagán (as percussionists), Rubén Rodríguez (as bassist), and Sergio George (as pianist) | Azúcar Negra | Nominated | |
| 1994 | El Gran Combo de Puerto Rico | First Class International | Nominated | |
| 1994 | Willie Colón | Hecho en Puerto Rico | Nominated | |
| 1995 | Jerry Rivera | Cara de Niño | Nominated | |
| 1996 | List: Cheito Quiñones (as chorist) and Edwin Bonilla (as percussionist) | Abriendo Puertas | Won | |
| 1996 | Marc Anthony | Todo a Su Tiempo | Nominated | |
| 1996 | Willie Colón | Tras La Tormenta | Nominated | |
| 1997 | Dark Latin Groove | DLG | Nominated | |
| 1997 | Jerry Rivera | Fresco | Nominated | |
| 1997 | Tony Vega | Tony Vega | Nominated | |
| 1998 | Olga Tañon | Llévame Contigo | Nominated | |
| 1998 | La India | Sobre el Fuego | Nominated | |
| 1999 | Marc Anthony | Contra la Corriente | Won | |
| 1999 | Eddie Palmieri | El Rumbero del Piano | Nominated | |
| 1999 | Elvis Crespo | Suavemente | Nominated | |
| 1999 | Tito Puente | Live at Birdland – Dancemania '99 | Nominated | |
| 2000 | Tito Puente | Mambo Birdland | Won | |
| 2001 | List: Cheito Quiñones (as chorist), Edwin Bonilla (as percussionist), José Feliciano (as vocalist and guitarist), Jorge Díaz Torres (as trombonist), Nelson González (as tresero), Papo Lucca (as arranger), and Yomo Toro (as cuatrista) | Alma Caribeña | Won | |
| 2003 | Plena Libre | Mi Ritmo | Nominated | |
| 2005 | Angel Meléndez and the 911 Mambo Orchestra | Angel Meléndez and the 911 Mambo Orchestra | Nominated | |
| 2007 | Gilberto Santa Rosa | Directo al Corazón | Won | |
| 2007 | Tito Nieves | Hoy, Mañana y Siempre | Nominated | |
| 2007 | Andy Montañez | Salsatón: Salsa con Reggaeton | Nominated | |
| 2008 | El Gran Combo de Puerto Rico | Arroz Con Habichuelas | Nominated | |
| 2008 | Spanish Harlem Orchestra | United We Swing | Nominated | |
| 2009 | José Feliciano | Señor Bachata | Won | |
| 2009 | New Swing Sextet | Back on the Streets... Taste of Spanish Harlem Vol. 2 | Nominated | |
| 2009 | Dark Latin Groove | Renacer | Nominated | |
| 2010 | José Lugo Orchestra | Guásabara | Won | |
| 2011 | Spanish Harlem Orchestra | Viva La Tradición | Won | |
| 2011 | Gilberto Santa Rosa | Irrepetible | Nominated | |
| 2011 | El Gran Combo de Puerto Rico | ¡Sin Salsa No Hay Paraíso! | Nominated | |
| 2012 | Edwin Bonilla | Homenaje A Los Rumberos | Nominated | |
| 2013 | Marlow Rosado and La Riqueña | Retro | Won | |
| 2013 | Eddie Montalvo | Desde Nueva York a Puerto Rico | Nominated | |
| 2013 | Romeo Santos | Formula, Vol. 1 | Nominated | |
| 2014 | Marc Anthony | 3.0 | Nominated | |
| 2014 | Sergio George | Sergio George Presents Salsa Giants | Nominated | |
| 2015 | El Gran Combo de Puerto Rico | 50 Aniversario | Nominated | |
| 2016 | Víctor Manuelle | Que Suenen los Tambores | Nominated | |
| 2017 | José Lugo and Guasábara Combo | Donde Están? | Won | |
| 2019 | Spanish Harlem Orchestra | Anniversary | Won | |
| 2019 | Charlie Aponte | Pa' Gente | Nominated | |
| 2020 | Marc Anthony | Opus | Won | |
| 2021 | Edwin Bonilla | Infinito | Nominated | |
| 2021 | Víctor Manuelle | Memorias de Navidad | Nominated | |
| 2022 | Gilberto Santa Rosa | Colegas | Nominated | |
| 2022 | El Gran Combo de Puerto Rico | En Cuarentena | Nominated | |
| 2023 | Marc Anthony | Pa'llá Voy | Won | |
| 2023 | Víctor Manuelle | Lado A Lado B | Nominated | |
| 2023 | Spanish Harlem Orchestra | Imágenes Latinas | Nominated | |
| 2023 | Tito Nieves | Legendario | Nominated | |
| 2024 | Luis Figueroa | Voy A Ti | Nominated | |
| 2024 | Marc Quiñones (as conguero and bongosero) | Mimy Succar & Tony Succar | Nominated | |
| 2025 | Marc Quiñones (as conguero and bongosero) | Alma, Corazón y Salsa (Live at Gran Teatro Nacional) | Won | |
| 2025 | Marc Anthony | Muévanse | Nominated | |
| 2026 | Gilberto Santa Rosa | Debut y Segunda Tanda, Vol. 2 | Nominated | |

=== Best Música Mexicana Album ===
| Year | Nominees(s) | Work | Result | Ref. |
|---|---|---|---|---|
| 2019 | Luis Miguel | ¡México Por Siempre! | Won | |

=== Best Global Music Performance ===
| Year | Nominees(s) | Work | Result | Ref. |
|---|---|---|---|---|
| 2026 | Bad Bunny | "Eoo" | Won | |

== Children's, Comedy, Audio Books, Visual Media, and Music Video/Film ==
=== Best Children's Music Album ===
| Year | Nominees(s) | Work | Result | Ref. |
|---|---|---|---|---|
| 1959 | José Ferrer | "Tubby the Tuba" | Nominated | |
| 1973 | Rita Moreno | "The Electric Company" | Won | |

=== Best Audio Book, Narration, and Storytelling Recording ===
| Year | Nominees(s) | Work | Result | Ref. |
|---|---|---|---|---|
| 2023 | Lin-Manuel Miranda | Aristotle and Dante Dive into the Waters of the World | Nominated | |

=== Best Compilation Soundtrack for Visual Media ===
| Year | Nominees(s) | Work | Result | Ref. |
|---|---|---|---|---|
| 2007 | Joaquin Phoenix | Walk the Line | Won | |
| 2018 | Lin-Manuel Miranda | Moana | Nominated | |
| 2022 | Lin-Manuel Miranda | In the Heights | Nominated | |
| 2023 | Lin-Manuel Miranda | Encanto | Won | |
| 2023 | List: Rita Moreno, Ariana DeBose, Ana Isabelle, Annelise Cepero Jamila Velazquez and Tanairi Sade Vazquez (as vocalists), Lola Rodríguez de Tió (as writer) | West Side Story | Nominated | |
| 2026 | Myke Towers and Dres (as vocalists) | F1 | Nominated | |

=== Best Score Soundtrack for Visual Media ===
| Year | Nominees(s) | Work | Result | Ref. |
|---|---|---|---|---|
| 1984 | Irene Cara | Flashdance | Won | |

=== Best Song Written for Visual Media ===
| Year | Nominees(s) | Work | Result | Ref. |
|---|---|---|---|---|
| 2004 | Luis Resto | "Lose Yourself" | Nominated | |
| 2018 | Lin-Manuel Miranda | "How Far I'll Go" | Won | |
| 2023 | Lin-Manuel Miranda | "We Don't Talk About Bruno" | Won | |
| 2024 | Ephrem Louis Lopez Jr. | "Barbie World" | Nominated | |

=== Best Music Film ===
| Year | Nominees(s) | Work | Result | Ref. |
|---|---|---|---|---|
| 2021 | Freestyle Love Supreme (group member Lin-Manuel Miranda) | We Are Freestyle Love Supreme | Nominated | |

== Package, Notes, and Historical ==
=== Best Album Cover ===
| Year | Nominees(s) | Work | Result | Ref. |
|---|---|---|---|---|
| 2026 | Bad Bunny | Debí Tirar Más Fotos | Nominated | |

== Production, Engineering, Composition, and Arrangement ==
=== Best Engineered Album, Non-Classical ===
| Year | Nominees(s) | Work | Result | Ref. |
|---|---|---|---|---|
| 1959 | Luis P. Valentin | Come Fly with Me | Nominated | |
| 1959 | Luis P. Valentin | "Witchcraft" | Nominated | |
| 1959 | Rafael O. Valentin | Other Worlds, Other Sounds | Nominated | |
| 1961 | Luis P. Valentin | Ella Fitzgerald Sings the George and Ira Gershwin Song Book | Won | |
| 1961 | Luis P. Valentin | Louis Bellson Swings Jule Styne | Nominated | |
| 1964 | Luis P. Valentin | Ella and Basie! | Nominated | |

=== Best Instrumental Composition ===
| Year | Nominees(s) | Work | Result | Ref. |
|---|---|---|---|---|
| 2023 | Miguel Zenón | "El País Invisible" | Nominated | |

== Classical ==
=== Best Opera Recording ===
| Year | Nominees(s) | Work | Result | Ref. |
|---|---|---|---|---|
| 1987 | Justino Díaz | Verdi: Otello | Nominated | |

=== Best Classical Solo Vocal Album ===
| Year | Nominees(s) | Work | Result | Ref. |
|---|---|---|---|---|
| 1975 | Martina Arroyo | There's a Meeting Here Tonight | Nominated | |

=== Best Contemporary Classical Composition ===
| Year | Nominees(s) | Work | Result | Ref. |
|---|---|---|---|---|
| 2010 | Roberto Sierra | Missa Latina 'Pro Pace' | Nominated | |
| 2015 | Roberto Sierra | Sinfonía No. 4 | Nominated | |

== Special Merit Awards ==
=== Lifetime Achievement Award ===
| Year | Recipient(s) | Result | Ref. |
|---|---|---|---|
| 1989 | Pablo Casals | Recipient | |
| 2002 | Tito Puente | Recipient | |
| 2012 | The Allman Brothers Band (band member Marc Quiñones) | Recipient | |

=== Trustees Award ===
| Year | Recipient(s) | Result | Ref. |
|---|---|---|---|
| 2026 | Eddie Palmieri | Recipient | |

=== Hall of Fame ===
| Year | Inductee(s) | Work | Result | Ref. |
|---|---|---|---|---|
| 1985 | Pablo Casals | Bach: Suites for Unaccompanied Cello | Inducted | |
| 1991 | Chita Rivera (lead vocalist) | West Side Story: Original Broadway Cast Recording | Inducted | |
| 1998 | Pablo Casals | Dvořák: Concerto in B Minor for Cello and Orchestra | Inducted | |
| 2002 | Tito Puente | "Oye Cómo Va" | Inducted | |
| 2004 | Rita Moreno (lead vocalist) | West Side Story: Film Soundtrack | Inducted | |
| 2010 | José Feliciano | "Feliz Navidad" | Inducted | |
| 2012 | Los Panchos (band member Hernando Avilés) | Mexicantos | Inducted | |

== No longer awarded ==
=== Pop ===
==== Best Female Pop Vocal Performance (1959–2011) ====
| Year | Nominees(s) | Work | Result | Ref. |
|---|---|---|---|---|
| 1981 | Irene Cara | "Fame" | Nominated | |

==== Best Male Pop Vocal Performance (1959–2011) ====
| Year | Nominees(s) | Work | Result | Ref. |
|---|---|---|---|---|
| 1969 | José Feliciano | "Light My Fire" | Won | |
| 2000 | Marc Anthony | "I Need to Know" | Nominated | |
| 2001 | Marc Anthony | "You Sang to Me" | Nominated | |
| 2001 | Ricky Martin | "She Bangs" | Nominated | |
| 2011 | Bruno Mars | " Just the Way You Are" | Won | |

==== Best Pop Performance by a Duo or Group with Vocals (1966–2011) ====
| Year | Nominees(s) | Work | Result | Ref. |
|---|---|---|---|---|
| 1974 | Tony Orlando and Dawn (band member Tony Orlando) | "Tie a Yellow Ribbon Round the Ole Oak Tree" | Nominated | |

==== Best Pop Collaboration with Vocals (1995–2011) ====
| Year | Nominees(s) | Work | Result | Ref. |
|---|---|---|---|---|
| 2002 | Ricky Martin | "Nobody Wants to Be Lonely" | Nominated | |

==== Best Pop Instrumental Performance (1969–2011) ====
| Year | Nominees(s) | Work | Result | Ref. |
|---|---|---|---|---|
| 1969 | José Feliciano | "Here, There and Everywhere" | Nominated | |
| 1986 | Spyro Gyra (band member Gerardo Velez) | "Shake Down" | Nominated | |
| 1996 | The Allman Brothers Band (band member Marc Quiñones) | "In Memory of Elizabeth Reed" | Nominated | |

=== Rock ===
==== Best Rock Instrumental Performance (1980–2011) ====
| Year | Nominees(s) | Work | Result | Ref. |
|---|---|---|---|---|
| 1991 | The Allman Brothers Band (band member Marc Quiñones) | "True Gravity" | Nominated | |
| 1992 | The Allman Brothers Band (band member Marc Quiñones) | "Kind of Bird" | Nominated | |
| 1996 | The Allman Brothers Band (band member Marc Quiñones) | "Jessica" | Won | |
| 2002 | The Allman Brothers Band (band member Marc Quiñones) | "High Falls" | Nominated | |
| 2004 | The Allman Brothers Band (band member Marc Quiñones) | "Instrumental Illness" | Nominated | |
| 2005 | The Allman Brothers Band (band member Marc Quiñones) | "Instrumental Illness" | Nominated | |

=== R&B ===
==== Best R&B Instrumental Performance (1970–1993) ====
| Year | Nominees(s) | Work | Result | Ref. |
|---|---|---|---|---|
| 1983 | Spyro Gyra (band member Gerardo Velez) | "Stripes" | Nominated | |
| 1986 | Dave Valentin | "Love Light in Flight" | Nominated | |

=== Rap ===
==== Best Rap Performance by a Duo or Group (1991–2011) ====
| Year | Nominees(s) | Work | Result | Ref. |
|---|---|---|---|---|
| 1998 | Angie Martinez | "Not Tonight" | Nominated | |
| 2005 | Terror Squad | "Lean Back" | Nominated | |
| 2008 | Fat Joe | "Make It Rain" | Nominated | |

=== Jazz ===
==== Best Jazz Fusion Performance (1980–1991) ====
| Year | Nominees(s) | Work | Result | Ref. |
|---|---|---|---|---|
| 1981 | Spyro Gyra (band member Gerardo Velez) | Catching the Sun | Nominated | |
| 1983 | Spyro Gyra (band member Gerardo Velez) | Incognito | Nominated | |
| 1984 | Spyro Gyra (band member Gerardo Velez) | City Kids | Nominated | |
| 1985 | Spyro Gyra (band member Gerardo Velez) | Access All Areas | Nominated | |
| 1986 | Spyro Gyra (band member Gerardo Velez) | Alternating Currents | Nominated | |
| 1991 | Spyro Gyra (band member Marc Quiñones) | Fast Forward | Nominated | |

=== American Roots ===
==== Best Contemporary Folk Album (1987–2011) ====
| Year | Nominees(s) | Work | Result | Ref. |
|---|---|---|---|---|
| 2004 | Jorge Calderón (as producer) | The Wind | Won | |

=== Gospel ===
==== Best Contemporary Christian Music Song (2012–2014) ====
| Year | Nominees(s) | Work | Result | Ref. |
|---|---|---|---|---|
| 2014 | David Garcia | "Overcomer" | Won | |

==== Best Soul Gospel Performance, Female (1984–1989) ====
| Year | Nominees(s) | Work | Result | Ref. |
|---|---|---|---|---|
| 1985 | Táta Vega | Oh, It Is Jesus | Nominated | |

=== Latin ===
==== Best Latin Recording (1976–1983) ====
| Year | Nominees(s) | Work | Result | Ref. |
|---|---|---|---|---|
| 1976 | Eddie Palmieri | Sun of Latin Music | Won | |
| 1976 | Ray Barretto | Barretto | Nominated | |
| 1976 | Fania All-Stars | Fania All-Stars Live at Yankee Stadium, Vol. 1 | Nominated | |
| 1976 | Willie Colón | The Good, the Bad, the Ugly | Nominated | |
| 1977 | Eddie Palmieri | Unfinished Masterpiece | Won | |
| 1977 | Joe Cuba | Cocinando Salsa | Nominated | |
| 1977 | Fania All-Stars | Salsa - Soundtrack | Nominated | |
| 1978 | Lalo Rodríguez | Fireworks | Nominated | |
| 1978 | Danny Rivera | Muy Amigos/Close Friends | Nominated | |
| 1978 | Ray Barretto | Tomorrow: Barretto Live | Nominated | |
| 1978 | Tito Puente | La Leyenda | Nominated | |
| 1979 | Tito Puente | Homenaje a Beny Moré | Won | |
| 1979 | Eddie Palmieri | Lucumi, Macumba, Voodoo | Nominated | |
| 1979 | Fania All-Stars | Coro Miyare | Nominated | |
| 1980 | Fania All-Stars | Cross Over | Nominated | |
| 1981 | Tito Puente | Dancemania '80 | Nominated | |
| 1981 | Ray Barretto | Rican/Struction | Nominated | |
| 1982 | Eddie Palmieri | Eddie Palmieri | Nominated | |
| 1983 | Willie Colón | Canciones del Solar de los Aburridos | Nominated | |
| 1983 | José Feliciano | Escenas de Amor | Nominated | |
| 1983 | Ray Barretto | Rhythm of Life | Nominated | |

==== Best Latin Pop, Rock or Urban Album (2012) ====
| Year | Nominees(s) | Work | Result | Ref. |
|---|---|---|---|---|
| 2012 | Calle 13 | Entren Los Que Quieran | Nominated | |

==== Best Latin Urban Album (2008–2009) ====
| Year | Nominees(s) | Work | Result | Ref. |
|---|---|---|---|---|
| 2008 | Calle 13 | Residente o Visitante | Won | |
| 2008 | Tego Calderón | El Abayarde Contraataca | Nominated | |
| 2008 | Daddy Yankee | El Cartel: The Big Boss | Nominated | |
| 2009 | Wisin & Yandel | Wisin vs. Yandel: Los Extraterrestres | Won | |
| 2009 | Julio Voltio | En lo Claro | Nominated | |
| 2009 | R.K.M & Ken-Y | The Royalty: La Realeza | Nominated | |

==== Best Merengue Album (2000–2003) ====
| Year | Nominees(s) | Work | Result | Ref. |
|---|---|---|---|---|
| 2000 | Elvis Crespo | Píntame | Won | |
| 2000 | Gisselle | Atada | Nominated | |
| 2000 | Jailene | Encontré el Amor | Nominated | |
| 2000 | Manny Manuel | Lleno de Vida | Nominated | |
| 2000 | Grupo Manía | The Dynasty | Nominated | |
| 2001 | Olga Tañon | Olga Viva, Viva Olga | Won | |
| 2001 | Grupo Manía | Masters of the Stage | Nominated | |
| 2001 | Gisselle | Voy a Enamorarte | Nominated | |
| 2002 | Olga Tañon | Yo Por Tí | Won | |
| 2002 | Gisselle | 8 | Nominated | |
| 2002 | Grupo Manía | Grupomania 2050 | Nominated | |
| 2003 | Grupo Manía | Latino | Won | |
| 2003 | Limi-T 21 | Calle Sabor, Esquina Amor | Nominated | |
| 2003 | Manny Manuel | Manny Manuel | Nominated | |

==== Best Salsa Album (2000–2003) ====
| Year | Nominees(s) | Work | Result | Ref. |
|---|---|---|---|---|
| 2000 | Jerry Rivera | De Otra Manera | Nominated | |
| 2000 | Dark Latin Groove | Gotcha! | Nominated | |
| 2000 | La India | Sola | Nominated | |
| 2001 | Tito Puente and Eddie Palmieri | Masterpiece/Obra Maestra | Won | |
| 2001 | List: David "Piro" Rodríguez (as trumpeter), George Delgado (as bongocero), La India (as vocalist), Tito Puente (as vocalist and arranger), José Madera and Willie Colon (as arrangers) | Celia Cruz and Friends: A Night of Salsa | Nominated | |
| 2001 | Tony Vega | Hablando del Amor | Nominated | |
| 2001 | Son By Four | Son By Four | Nominated | |
| 2002 | List: Bobby Capó, Héctor Lavoe, and Willie Colón (as songwriters), David Pabón (as pianist), Edwin Bonilla, Edwin Rosas, Jorge Padilla, and Samuel García (as percussionists), Pichie Pérez (as chorist), Luis Aquino and Ricky Zayas (as trumpeters), and Papo Lucca (as arranger and pianist) | Encore | Won | |
| 2002 | Tito Nieves | En Otra Onda | Nominated | |
| 2002 | Gilberto Santa Rosa | Intenso | Nominated | |
| 2002 | Frankie Negrón | Por Tu Placer | Nominated | |
| 2003 | List: Carlos Henriquez and Rubén Rodríguez (as bassists), David "Piro" Rodríguez and Héctor Colón (as trumpeters), Jorge González, Marc Quiñones, Ray Colón, Ritchie Flores, and Willie Romero (as percussionists), Néstor Sánchez and Ray Viera (as chorists), Ozzie Meléndez (as trombonist), Papo Lucca (as arranger and pianist), Sergio George (as producer and songwriter), and Willie Rodríguez (as pianist) | La Negra Tiene Tumbao | Won | |
| 2003 | Marc Anthony | Libre | Nominated | |
| 2003 | Spanish Harlem Orchestra | Un Gran Día en el Barrio | Nominated | |
| 2003 | Anthony Cruz | Un Nuevo Amanecer | Nominated | |

==== Best Salsa/Merengue Album (2004–2006) ====
| Year | Nominees(s) | Work | Result | Ref. |
|---|---|---|---|---|
| 2004 | List: Marc Quiñones (as percussionist), Rubén Rodríguez (as bassist), and Sergio George (as producer and songwriter) | Regalo del Alma | Won | |
| 2004 | La India | Latin Songbird: Mi Alma y Corazón | Nominated | |
| 2004 | Víctor Manuelle | Le Preguntaba a La Luna | Nominated | |
| 2004 | Truco & Zaperoko | Música Univeral | Nominated | |
| 2004 | Tito Rojas | Perseverancia | Nominated | |
| 2004 | Ismael Miranda | Tequila y Ron... A Tribute to José Alfredo Jiménez | Nominated | |
| 2005 | Spanish Harlem Orchestra | Across 110th Street | Won | |
| 2005 | Gilberto Santa Rosa | Auténtico | Nominated | |
| 2005 | Víctor Manuelle | Travesía | Nominated | |
| 2005 | Marc Anthony | Valió la Pena | Nominated | |
| 2006 | List: Cheito Quiñones (as chorist) | Son del Alma | Won | |
| 2006 | Eddie Santiago | Después del Silencio | Nominated | |
| 2006 | Tito Nieves | Fabricando Fantasías | Nominated | |

==== Best Mexican/Mexican-American Album (1984–2008) ====
| Year | Nominees(s) | Work | Result | Ref. |
|---|---|---|---|---|
| 1985 | Luis Miguel | "Me Gustas Tal Cómo Eres" | Won | |
| 2006 | Luis Miguel | México en la Piel | Won | |

=== Global Music ===
==== Best Traditional World Music Album (2004–2011) ====
| Year | Nominees(s) | Work | Result | Ref. |
|---|---|---|---|---|
| 2004 | Ecos de Borinquen | Jibaro Hasta El Hueso: Mountain Music of Puerto Rico | Nominated | |
| 2006 | Los Pleneros de la 21 | Para Todos Ustedes | Nominated | |
| 2010 | John Santos y El Coro Folklórico Kindembo | La Guerra No | Nominated | |

==== Best Contemporary World Music Album (2004–2011) ====
| Year | Nominees(s) | Work | Result | Ref. |
|---|---|---|---|---|
| 2009 | Giovanni Hidalgo | Global Drum Project | Won | |

=== Children’s ===
==== Best Spoken Word Album for Children (1994–2011) ====
| Year | Nominees(s) | Work | Result | Ref. |
|---|---|---|---|---|
| 1999 | Miguel Ferrer | Disney's The Lion King II: Simba's Pride Read-Along | Nominated | |

=== Production/Engineering ===
==== Best Engineered Recording – Special or Novel Effects (1959–1965) ====
| Year | Nominees(s) | Work | Result | Ref. |
|---|---|---|---|---|
| 1959 | Luis P. Valentin | The Bat | Nominated | |
| 1962 | Rafael O. Valentin | X-15 and Other Sounds: Rockets Missiles and Jets | Nominated | |

=== Classical ===
==== Best Chamber Music Performance (1959–2011) ====
| Year | Nominees(s) | Work | Result | Ref. |
|---|---|---|---|---|
| 1959 | Pablo Casals | Beethoven: Trio in E Flat Major/Trio in D Major | Nominated | |

==== Best Classical Crossover Album (1999–2011) ====
| Year | Nominees(s) | Nominated for | Result | Ref. |
|---|---|---|---|---|
| 2007 | John Santos | Látigo | Nominated | |

== See also ==
- Grammy Awards
- Grammy Award milestones
- List of Grammy Award categories
- List of Grammy Award winners and nominees by country
