= Janice Robinson (trombonist) =

American jazz musician

Janice Elaine Robinson (born December 28, 1951, Clairton, Pennsylvania) is an American jazz trombonist and trumpeter.

Robinson played trombone on The Bill Cosby Show in her teens, at which time she also played trumpet, and received a bachelor's degree from the Eastman School of Music in 1973. She then played with Chuck Mangione and doubled trombone and trumpet on his album Land of Make Believe’’, the Jazz Composer's Orchestra, Clark Terry, Sam Rivers, Buddy Rich, the Thad Jones-Mel Lewis Orchestra, Gil Evans, Frank Foster, and Slide Hampton. In 1978 she assembled a small ensemble with Sharon Freeman, Buster Williams, and Kenny Kirkland as sidemen. In the early 1980s she continued working with Foster as well as with Dizzy Gillespie and George Gruntz. Other work included associations with McCoy Tyner, Marian McPartland, Billy Taylor, David "Fathead" Newman, Carmen McRae, Idris Muhammad, Lionel Hampton, Woody Shaw, Mercer Ellington, Jimmy Owens, Grant Green, Sarah Vaughan, Dexter Gordon, and Kazumi Watanabe.

== Discography ==
With Frank Foster

- Bursting Out! (Denon, 1978)
- Manhattan Fever (Denon, 1978)
- Shiny Stockings (Denon, 1979)
- Twelve Shades of Black for All Intentions and Purposes (Leo, 1979)
- Well Water (Piadrum, 2007)

With Lionel Hampton

- Blackout (Who's Who in Jazz, 1977)
- Who's Who in Jazz Presents Lionel Hampton (Philips, 1977)
- Dizzy Spells (Jazz Time, 1993)

With Buddy Rich

- Speak No Evil (RCA Victor, 1976)
- The Exciting Buddy Rich (RCA, 1979)
- No Jive (Novus, 1992)

With others

- Hank Crawford, Centerpiece (Buddah, 1980)
- D Train, You're the One for Me (Prelude, 1982)
- Cornell Dupree, Shadow Dancing (Versatile, 1978)
- Gil Evans, Live in Dortmund 1976 (JazzTraffic, 2017)
- Ricky Ford, Loxodonta Africana (New World, 1977)
- Grant Green, Easy (Versatile, 1978)
- Slide Hampton, World of Trombones (West 54, 1979)
- Phyllis Hyman, Phyllis Hyman (Buddah, 1977)
- Paul Jabara, De La Noche: The True Story A Poperetta (Warner Bros., 1986)
- Thad Jones & Mel Lewis, Suite for Pops (A&M/Horizon, 1975)
- Thad Jones & Mel Lewis, New Life Dedicated to Max Gordon (A&M/Horizon, 1976)
- Van McCoy, And His Magnificent Movie Machine (H&L, 1977)
- Van McCoy, Lonely Dancer (MCA, 1979)
- Carmen McRae, I'm Coming Home Again New York 1978 (Jazzaround, 2000)
- Chuck Mangione, Encore (Mercury, 1975)
- Chuck Mangione, Chuck Mangione's Finest Hour (Verve, 2000)
- Grachan Moncur III & Jazz Composer's Orchestra, Echoes of Prayer (JCOA, 1975)
- Idris Muhammad, You Ain't No Friend of Mine! (Fantasy, 1978)
- Jimmy Owens, Headin' Home (A&M/Horizon, 1978)
- David Ruffin, In My Stride (Motown, 1977)
- Woody Shaw, Rosewood (CBS/Sony 1978)
- Clark Terry, Clark Terry's Big-B-a-d-Band Live at the Wichita Jazz Festival 1974 (Vanguard, 1975)
- Clifford Thornton & Jazz Composer's Orchestra, The Gardens of Harlem (JCOA, 1975)
- McCoy Tyner, Inner Voices (Milestone, 1978)
- Martha Velez, American Heartbeat (Sire, 1977)
- Kazumi Watanabe, The Best Performance (Better Days, 1982)
- Stevie Wonder, Stevie Wonder's Original Musiquarium 1 (Tamla, 1982)
