= The Gardens of Harlem =

Studio album by Clifford Thornton
- Released: 1975
- Recorded: April 4, 1974
- Studio: Blue Rock, New York City
- Genre: Free jazz
- Label: JCOA; LP 1008

Clifford Thornton chronology
Communications Network (1972)	The Gardens of Harlem (1975)

Jazz Composer's Orchestra chronology
Numatik Swing Band (1973)	The Gardens of Harlem (1975)	Echoes of Prayer (1975)

The Gardens of Harlem is an album by multi-instrumentalist and composer Clifford Thornton. It was recorded at the Blue Rock Studio in New York City in April 1974, and was released in 1975 by JCOA Records. On the album, Thornton is joined by members of the Jazz Composer's Orchestra, supplemented by seven musicians playing African percussion instruments. The music was conducted by Jack Jeffers.

== Reception ==
Professional ratings
Review scores
Source	Rating
AllMusic	3/5 stars
The Rolling Stone Jazz Record Guide	4/5 stars

In an article for London Jazz News, Jon Turney stated: "Clifford Thornton... led the final release credited to the co-operative Jazz Composers' Orchestra, and it's a great one. The multiple African percussion that features prominently in the early pieces here energises the music wonderfully. And as the notes made clear, that collection of sounds arises because the whole work explores West African music and how it has travelled 'from West to North Africa, the Caribbean, the South Eastern United States, to Harlem'. He evoked that history by selecting vocal melodies from the territories in question, and orchestrating them... They are fine tunes, orchestrated with great skill, and evocative in their own right. Add some great jazz soloing, and it's a heady brew."

John Corbett called Thornton "another figure whose thin discography distorts his real significance," and described the album as "gorgeous, majestic, intricate."

Writing for The Rolling Stone Jazz Record Guide, Fred Goodman commented: "this... album... remains one of the more satisfying fusions of traditional Third World musics with the American jazz tradition. Thornton's compositions get superb treatment here from the Jazz Composer's Orchestra... Gardens of Harlem weaves together into one grand tapestry the many experimental directions being pursued on the New York scene during that period."

David Hollenberg, in a 1976 review for Mother Jones, commented: "The Jazz Composer's Orchestra... have published ten records... All are ambitious and honest, especially a recent album entitled The Gardens of Harlem... It is not the first time that a jazz musician has attempted to integrate 'primitive' music with jazz... but it is to my knowledge the most thorough and believable attempt."

In a review for AllMusic, Eugene Chadbourne wrote: "There was something of a struggle getting this project finished and released... Gardens of Harlem... perpetually in the oven or being rehearsed in dribs and drabs, was to be [Thornton's] masterpiece, bringing together Afro-Cuban, Jamaican, Ghanaian, Algerian, American blues, and gospel influences as well as a piece based on the cry of a South Carolina fruit vendor. A massive cast was to be involved, including some hot avant-garde jazz soloists and a stage full of percussionists. Slightly more than 50 minutes was eventually released, and the good moments are truly riveting, making one long for the version of this album that might have been created had someone with deeper pockets been around... it is a shame Thornton was unable to create a larger body of work with this kind of vision."

== Track listing ==
All compositions by Clifford Thornton.

1. "Ogún Bára" – 5:46 (soloist: Janice Robinson)
2. "O Desayo" – 8:02 (soloists: Clifford Thornton, Roland Alexander)
3. "Agbadzá" – 9:42 (soloists: Clifford Thornton, Marvin Peterson, Michael Ridley)
4. "Changó Obarí" – 4:33 (soloist: Leo Smith)
5. "Aïn Salah" – 8:16 (soloist: Clifford Thornton)
6. "Gospel Ballade" – 4:44 (soloists: Carla Bley, Charles Stephens)
7. "Sweet Oranges" – 1:08
8. "Blues City" – 8:57 (soloists: George Barrow, Dewey Redman, Ted Daniel)

== Personnel ==
- Clifford Thornton – cornet, valve trombone, shenai, cabasa, bell
- Carlos Ward – alto saxophone, flute
- Dewey Redman – alto saxophone, tenor saxophone
- Pat Patrick – tenor saxophone, soprano saxophone
- Roland Alexander – tenor saxophone
- George Barrow – baritone saxophone, flute
- Michael Ridley – trumpet
- Marvin Peterson – trumpet
- Leo Smith – trumpet
- Ted Daniel – trumpet, flugelhorn
- Charles Stephens – trombone
- Janice Robinson – trombone
- John Thompson – French horn
- Gregory Williams – French horn
- Bob Stewart – tuba
- Carla Bley – piano
- Andy González – bass
- Art Lewis – drums
- Kobena Adzenyah – nnawuronta, apentima, oprenten, ntrowa, conga, sogo, atsimevu
- Jerry González – kónkolo bata, kaganu, quinto, tumba, bell, palos
- Milton Cardona – itótele bata, tumba
- Gene Golden – iyá bata, tumba, palos
- Vincent Jorge – tumba, axatse, conga
- Asante Darkwa – gankogui, nnaronta, bell
- Laxmi G. Tewari – axatse, kidi, ntrowa
- Jack Jeffers – conductor
