= Communications Network (album) =

Live album by Clifford Thornton
- Released: 1972
- Recorded: January and April, 1972
- Venue: ABC Stage City, New York City, and Festival of African American Music, Wesleyan University, Middletown, Connecticut
- Genre: Free jazz
- Label: Third World Records; LP 12272

Clifford Thornton chronology
The Panther and the Lash (1971)	Communications Network (1972)	The Gardens of Harlem (1974)

Communications Network is a live album by multi-instrumentalist and composer Clifford Thornton. The two-part composition titled "Communications Network" was recorded on January 22, 1972, at ABC Stage City in New York City, and features Thornton on electric piano and cornet, along with Lakshinarayana Shankar on violin, Sirone on bass, and Jerome Cooper on percussion. The remaining piece, "Festivals And Funerals," based on Jayne Cortez's poem of the same name, was recorded on April 17, 1972, at the Festival of African American Music at Wesleyan University, Middletown, Connecticut, and features Thornton on cornet, Cortez as reciter, Nathan Davis on soprano saxophone, Jay Hoggard on vibraphone, Andy González on bass, Jerry González and Vincent George on congas and percussion, and Nicky Marrero on timbales and percussion. The album was released by Third World Records later in 1972.

== Reception ==
Professional ratings
Review scores
Source	Rating
AllMusic	3/5 stars

AllMusic awarded the album 3 stars. Reviewer Michael G. Nastos called it "potent."

In a review for The Hum, Bradford Bailey called the album "an incredible display of the diverse range in [Thornton's] abilities. The first side is a rising tide of sound and energy – Free-Jazz with the brakes removed, while the second is more delicate and restrained, laced with poetry by Jayne Cortez... It's a lovely album that I can't recommend enough."

Writing for Black World/Negro Digest, Ron Welburn praised the album's "musical inventiveness" but criticized its sound quality. He also stated that Shankar "must be heard for his vision-inspired playing," and expressed hope that Thornton would work with a large orchestra at some point.

== Track listing ==
All compositions by Clifford Thornton.

1. "Communications Network Part 1" – 11:46
2. "Communications Network Part 2" – 5:29
3. "Festivals And Funerals" (poem by Jayne Cortez) – 24:45

== Personnel ==
- Clifford Thornton – electric piano (tracks 1 and 2), cornet (all tracks)
- Lakshinarayana Shankar – violin (tracks 1 and 2)
- Sirone – bass (tracks 1 and 2)
- Jerome Cooper – percussion (tracks 1 and 2)
- Jayne Cortez – voice (track 3)
- Nathan Davis – soprano saxophone (track 3)
- Jay Hoggard – vibraphone (track 3)
- Andy González – bass (track 3)
- Jerry González – congas, percussion (track 3)
- Vincent George – congas, percussion (track 3)
- Nicky Marrero – timbales, percussion (track 3)
