= Echoes of Prayer =

Studio album by Grachan Moncur III and the Jazz Composer's Orchestra
- Released: 1975
- Recorded: April 11, 1974
- Studio: Blue Rock Studio, New York City
- Genre: Free jazz
- Label: JCOA Records; LP 1009

Grachan Moncur III chronology
Aco Dei de Madrugada (1970)	Echoes of Prayer (1975)	Shadows (1977)

Jazz Composer's Orchestra chronology
The Gardens of Harlem (1975)	Echoes of Prayer (1975)	For Players Only (1975)

Echoes of Prayer is an album by trombonist and composer Grachan Moncur III on which he is joined by members of the Jazz Composer's Orchestra and the Tanawa Dance Ensemble. It was recorded on April 11, 1974, at Blue Rock Studio in New York City, and was released in 1975 by JCOA Records. Moncur's only recorded work for large ensemble, Echoes of Prayer was commissioned by the JCOA, and consists of four movements dedicated to Martin Luther King Jr., Medgar Evers, Marcus Garvey, and Angela Davis. It was initially performed at a workshop concert at New York University's Loeb Student Center on the day before the recording session.

== Reception ==
Professional ratings
Review scores
Source	Rating
AllMusic	4/5 stars
The Virgin Encyclopedia of Jazz	3/5 stars

In a review for AllMusic, Scott Yanow called Moncur "one of the unsung heroes of the avant-garde," and wrote: "The music is quite advanced, sometimes pretty dense, and will take a few listens to fully digest."

Ed Berger of JazzTimes called Echoes of Prayer Moncur's "most ambitious work," "an orchestral work of great rhythmic variety and emotional depth," and noted that it "features some of Moncur's most powerful trombone statements on record."

== Track listing ==
Composed by Grachan Moncur III.

1. "Prologue" / "Reverend King's Wings I" / "Medgar's Menace I" / "Drum Transition I" / "Garvey's Ghost (Space Station)" – 12:09
2. "Angela's Angel I" / "Drum Transition II" – 8:30
3. "Right On I" / "Angela's Angel II" / "Right On II" / "Reverend King's Wings II" / "Medgar's Menace II" / "Drum Transition III" / "African Percussion Ensemble" – 20:02
4. "Right On III" / "Angela's Angel III (Jamboree)" / "Drum Transition IV" / "Amen Cadence" / "Epilogue: Excuse Me, Mr. Justice" – 3:42

== Personnel ==
- Grachan Moncur III – trombone, voice, composer (soloist on "Prologue", "Garvey's Ghost", and "Angela's Angel I")
- Keith Marks – flute (on "Reverend King's Wings I")
- Pat Patrick – flute (soloist on "Angela's Angel I")
- Perry Robinson – clarinet (soloist on "Medgar's Menace II")
- Carlos Ward – alto saxophone, flute (soloist on "Medgar's Menace I")
- Hannibal Marvin Peterson – trumpet (soloist on "Angela's Angel II")
- Stafford Osborne – trumpet (soloist on "Medgar's Menace I")
- Janice Robinson – trombone
- Jack Jeffers – bass trombone (soloist on "Angela's Angel III")
- Leroy Jenkins – violin (soloist on "Medgar's Menace II")
- Ngoma – violin
- Toni Marcus – viola (on "Garvey's Ghost")
- Jeanne Lee – voice
- Mervine Grady – voice
- Mark Elf – guitar (soloist on "Angela's Angel III")
- Carla Bley – piano
- Cecil McBee – double bass (soloist on "Garvey's Ghost")
- Charlie Haden – double bass (soloist on "Garvey's Ghost")
- Beaver Harris – drums

Tanawa Dance Ensemble (soloists on "African Percussion Ensemble")

- Titos Sompa – percussion
- Coster Massamba – percussion
- Frederick Simpson – percussion
- Malonga Quasquelourd – percussion
- Jakuba Abiona – percussion
