= The Panther and the Lash =

Live album by Clifford Thornton
- Released: 1971
- Recorded: November 7, 1970
- Venue: La Maison de la Radio, Paris
- Genre: Jazz
- Length: 53:45
- Label: America
- Producer: Pierre Berjot

Clifford Thornton chronology
Ketchaoua (1969)	The Panther and the Lash (1971)	Communications Network (1972)

reissue cover

The Panther and the Lash is an album by American free jazz trumpeter and trombonist Clifford Thornton, recorded live in 1970 in Paris, originally released on the French America label, and reissued on CD in 2004 by Universal France.

== Background ==
Thornton leads a quartet with two local musicians from the French free jazz scene—pianist François Tusques and bassist Beb Guérin—and the expatriate American drummer Noel McGhie. The title of the album references the American poet Langston Hughes's final book. The leader own's composition "Huey Is Free" celebrates the release of the founder of the Black Panther Party, Huey P. Newton.

== Reception ==
Professional ratings
Review scores
Source	Rating
AllMusic	4.5/5 stars
The Penguin Guide to Jazz	3/4 stars

In his review for AllMusic, Dan Warburton states "Thornton is in absolutely breathtaking form throughout this live set."

The Exclaim! review by Nate Dorward says that the album "offers a near-perfect balance of the best characteristics of classic free jazz: it’s an earthy, engaging mixture of populist, World music and avant-garde elements, often explicitly politicised."

The Penguin Guide to Jazz notes that "it's strong, undated music that restores Thornton's almost vanished reputation to a large degree."

== Track listing ==
1. "Huey Is Free" (Clifford Thornton) – 12:18
2. "El Fath" (Clifford Thornton) – 13:35
3. "Tout le Pouvoir au Peuple" (François Tusques) – 4:23
4. "Paysage Désolé" (François Tusques) – 3:27
5. "Right On!" (François Tusques) – 3:38
6. "Shango / Aba L'Ogun" (trad. West Africa) – 11:31
7. "Mahiya Illa Zalab" (trad. Tunisia) – 4:53

== Personnel ==
- Clifford Thornton – cornet, shenai, valve trombone, piano, maracas
- François Tusques – piano, celesta, balafon, maracas
- Beb Guérin – double bass
- Noel McGhie – drums, percussion
