= Freedom & Unity (album) =

Studio album by Clifford Thornton
- Released: 1969
- Recorded: July 22, 1967
- Studio: Sound City Studios, New York City
- Genre: Jazz
- Length: 1:15:57
- Label: Third World Records; LP 9636

Clifford Thornton chronology
Freedom & Unity (1969)	Ketchaoua (1969)

Freedom & Unity is an album by valve trombonist Clifford Thornton. It was recorded in July 1967 at Sound City Studios in New York City, and was released by Third World Records in 1969. On the album, Thornton is joined by members of the Clifford Thornton New Art Ensemble: saxophonist Sonny King, trumpeter Joe McPhee, cornetist Edward Avent, vibraphonist Karl Berger, bassists Don Moore, Jimmy Garrison, and Tyrone Crabb, and drummer Harold (Nunding) Avent.

== Reception ==
Professional ratings
Review scores
Source	Rating
AllMusic	4.5/5 stars
The Penguin Guide to Jazz	3.5/4 stars

In a review for AllMusic, Rob Ferrier wrote: "For those who don't know better, the free jazz movement is considered a sharp break with the past heritage of the music. That really wasn't the case. As Albert Ayler and Archie Shepp hearkened back to field hollers and very basic folk forms, musicians like Clifford Thornton went in the opposite direction, building on the music of the sophisticates and expanding the possibilities for jazz. Listening to music with this much space in it, it might be hard for some listeners to hear the Mingus. But it's there. And because that's there, Ellington is here in heaping handfuls as well. Sure this stuff is rough in spots. But the myriad of tones this man uses to express himself keeps things interesting and alive... For those with open ears -- and minds."

The authors of The Penguin Guide to Jazz commented: "Freedom & Unity was apparently recorded the day after John Coltrane’s funeral. If that was the point where Albert Ayler took up the mantle and set about restoring the relationship between avant-garde jazz, R&B and older, more primitive forms, then Clifford Thornton seemed anxious to go in the other direction and create a body of music that draws on highly sophisticated forms and ideas... Thompson's [sic] fleet, almost sinuous trombone style was like nothing else at the time."

Writing for All About Jazz, Mark Corroto stated: "Freedom & Unity... is a natural extension of the music of Ornette Coleman... Thornton, who rehearsed across the hall from Ornette's trio, certainly was listening. His piano-less quintet and extended New Art Ensemble pursue Coleman's breakthroughs in melody and rhythm with different instrumentation... This document of significant music calls for further exploration of the ever-neglected free jazz past."

== Track listing ==
1. "Free Huey" (Harold Avent) – 13:09
2. "15th Floor" (King) – 8:51
3. "Miss Oula" (King) – 4:48
4. "Kevin (The Theme)" (Thornton) – 0:22
5. "Exosphere" (J. Virgillio) – 10:07
6. "Uhuru" (King) – 8:31
7. "O.C.T." (McPhee) – 4:38
8. "The Wake (Complete Version)" (Harold Avent) – 14:18

== Personnel ==
- Clifford Thornton – valve trombone
- Sonny King – alto saxophone
- Joe McPhee – trumpet (track 7)
- Edward Avent – cornet (tracks 1 and 8)
- Karl Berger – vibraphone
- Don Moore – bass
- Jimmy Garrison – bass (track 7)
- Tyrone Crabb – bass (tracks 1 and 8)
- Harold (Nunding) Avent – drums
