= Clifford Thornton =

American jazz musician and activist (1936–1989)

- Born: Clifford Edward Thornton III; September 6, 1936; Philadelphia, Pennsylvania, U.S.
- Died: November 25, 1989 (aged 53) Geneva, Switzerland
- Genres: Avant-garde jazz, free jazz
- Occupations: Musician, composer, bandleader, educator
- Instruments: Trumpet, trombone

Clifford Edward Thornton III (September 6, 1936 – November 25, 1989) was an American jazz trumpeter, trombonist, political activist, and educator. He played free jazz and avant-garde jazz in the 1960s and 1970s.

== Career ==
Clifford was born in Philadelphia. The year of his birth has been reported as early as 1934 or as late as 1939. Jazz pianist Jimmy Golden was his uncle, while his cousin, drummer J. C. Moses, had a jazz career that was cut short by failing health. Clifford began piano lessons when he was seven-years-old.

He briefly attended Morgan State University and Temple University. Several biographers report that Clifford studied with trumpeter Donald Byrd during 1957, after Byrd had left Art Blakey's Jazz Messengers, and also that he worked with 17-year-old tuba player Ray Draper and Webster Young. Following a late 1950s stint in the U.S. Army bands Thornton moved to New York City.

Clifford's political and musical motivations are epitomized by his statement: "For a lot of brothers like myself, we got no choice. What else can we do in this world that's not a slave job? Really, what are our options? We have to be creative musicians if we want to be somebody in this world."

In the early 1960s, Clifford lived in the Williamsburg area of Brooklyn in an apartment building with other young musicians, including Rashied Ali, Marion Brown, and Don Cherry. He performed with numerous avant-garde jazz bands, appearing as a sideman on records by notable artists Sun Ra, Archie Shepp, Pharoah Sanders, and Sam Rivers; many of whom were affected by the compositional ideas of Cecil Taylor. In the January 1976 Black World/Negro Digest, Ron Welburne states that during this period Clifford had been active in the Black Arts Movement, associated with Amiri Baraka and Jayne Cortez. This musical and artistic network provided him with a variety of perspectives on ideas such as black self-determination, performance forms, outside playing, and textural rhythm; it also gave him access to performers who would provide the abilities some of his later compositions required. He was included in the dialogue around the developing thought of political artists, including Shepp, Askia M. Touré, and Nathan Hare, as well as the journals Freedomways and Umbra.

=== Early albums ===
Thornton's interest in composition eventually became the focus of his musical career. He had worked with Marzette Watts on the latter's first recording sessions; Watts credited Clifford's organizational skills and management of the group dynamics with the success of the sessions in achieving their goals.

Thornton's first album, Freedom & Unity (1967), was recorded the day after John Coltrane's funeral. The ensemble included Karl Berger, Coltrane associate Jimmy Garrison, and the first recorded appearance of Joe McPhee. It also included Edward and Harold "Nunding" Avent, a black activist who a year later was suspected of being an informant and provocateur for the FBI. Of the ten songs, only the twenty-second-long "Kevin" is credited to Thornton. Archie Shepp and Ornette Coleman both wrote liner notes for the album. In the AllMusic review, Rob Ferrier says: "As Albert Ayler and Archie Shepp hearkened back to field hollers and very basic folk forms, musicians like Clifford Thornton went in the opposite direction, building on the music of the sophisticates and expanding the possibilities for jazz."

Thornton was invited with Shepp to perform in Algiers for the 1969 Pan-African Cultural Festival of the Organization of African Unity. This visit had an important impact on his developing political thought, and he claimed that it helped to integrate his musical and political aims. The next month he was in Paris, and over an eleven-day period at BYG Actuel he recorded five albums, including Ketchaoua, his second album as leader and first with his own compositions. In October a Thornton-led group performed at the Actuel Festival in Amougies, Belgium. At this early European pop and jazz festival (which claimed Woodstock as an inspiration and included performances by Pink Floyd, MEV, and a Frank Zappa/Archie Shepp jam-session) Clifford got to hear and work with a number of young free-jazz artists from Chicago.

In November he was back in Paris as a sideman on Archie Shepp's albums Black Gypsy and Pitchin Can. He continued to work in France through the next year, recording in July 1970 with Shepp, and completing his own album The Panther and the Lash in early November. During this two-year period, Thornton worked with many European free jazz musicians, as well as growing his network of contacts to embrace Americans who had not been in the early-'60s New York scene, such as Chicago musicians Joseph Jarman, Malachi Favors, and Anthony Braxton). Thornton also established political and intellectual connections to avant-garde artists and musicians, including Frederic Rzewski, Philip Glass, and Richard Teitelbaum. During that period he also commenced a relationship with Cristine Jakob.

=== Teaching ===
In 1968, music instructor Ken McIntyre recommended Thornton as a candidate for assistant professor in world music at Wesleyan University. He was hired in 1969; this position gave him the security to travel to Africa and France. His tenure ran through 1975; during that period he brought many of his network of jazz musicians as Artists-in-Residence on campus, giving the academic world-music community more exposure to current American music. Among those artists were Sam Rivers, Jimmy Garrison, Ed Blackwell, and Marion Brown. He arranged performances at Wesleyan by Rashied Ali, Horace Silver, McCoy Tyner and many other jazz musicians. In addition, he included other artists from the world music program on his recordings, such as Milton Cardona, Abraham Kobena Adzenyah, Pandit Laxmi Ganesh Tewari, and Lakshminarayana Shankar), and introduced them to his fellow African-American performers.

While at Wesleyan, he recorded the 1972 pastiché album Communications Network (side one with Sirone and Shankar, side two backing Jayne Cortez, and both engineered by Marzette Watts). He also began writing for the Gardens of Harlem album.

=== Composing ===
Thornton's earliest recordings as a composer and arranger are found on Marzette Watts's eponymous 1966 record. Most works recorded with his own name as leader were large-form compositions. He used as many as eight performers on the ten recordings, and their length runs from the eight-minute "Pan-African Festival" to the twenty-five-minute "Festivals and Funerals" on the album Communications Network (1972). He included shorter pieces by his collaborators on the albums, as well as his arrangements of traditional African pieces. The Gardens of Harlem (1974) was developed as a project of the Jazz Composer's Orchestra during 1972–1974, and was revised twice before the twenty-five-person recording was done in April 1974. It was released in 1975.

About The Gardens of Harlem Clifford wrote: "The challenge of writing for and working with large, ensembles has always interested me. My first influences in this direction as a child were the big bands of Basie, Eckstine, Gillespie, Machito and Puente. Later, I had the good fortune of working with the orchestras of Sun Ra, Bill Dixon, Sam Rivers, Archie Shepp and the JCOA. The spiritual and psychological fulfillment resulting from re-establishing the relationship with the traditional ethos...serves chiefly as a balance between the inner-self and the environment. This is, in part, the role and function of music in traditional African societies and among peoples of primarily African derivation. In this connection, music is vital to both religious and secular life for the same reasons and is manifested in the same ways. It is the core and foundation, the language of both religious and philosophic thought."

Thornton was widely perceived in the media as owning radical political leanings and connections with leading figures of the Black Panther Party; he is supposed to have met Bobby Seale and Eldridge Cleaver during the Pan-African Cultural Festival in 1969, and claims have been made that he was a BPP Minister for Art. He was denied entry into France in 1970, reportedly for a speech he made either at that year's Juan-les-Pins Jazz Festival or at Mutualite Hall in Paris; the ban was lifted in 1971. Because of this interruption, Thornton was unable to continue performing and recording in Paris.

In 1976, Clifford accepted a position with UNESCO's International Bureau of Education to be an educational counselor on African-American education; he spent the remainder of his life in Geneva, Switzerland. He remained active musically; he led a performance in 1977 at Willisau, Lucerne, Switzerland, did two recordings in Austria with Anthony Braxton in 1977 and 1978, and was featured on a 1980 record with a group led by former Dollar Brand reedman and South African exile Joe Malinga.

Several of Thornton's musician contemporaries claim his music influenced them. The most notable are likely Joe McPhee (who owns Thornton's valve trombone), Marzette Watts, and Bill Cole. Younger musicians affected by Clifford's musical thought include Fred Ho, Hajj Daoud Haroon, George Starks, Ras Moshe Burnett, Peter Zummo, and Marie Incontrera. A number of musicians and educators also directly benefitted from being part of Thornton's network, among them Marion Brown, Ed Blackwell, Rashied Ali, Jimmy Garrison, Sam Rivers, and Lakshminarayana Shankar.

Thornton can be heard on only a small number of recordings that are now difficult to find. Still, thirty (or perhaps thirty-five) years after his demise, Clifford's work remains highly regarded by critics such as Thurston Moore, author Philippe Carles, and Jazz.com's Sean Singer.

== Discography ==
=== As leader ===
- 1967: Freedom & Unity (Third World/Unheard Music Series) with Karl Berger, Jimmy Garrison, John McCortney, Joe McPhee, Don Moore
- 1969: Ketchaoua (BYG Actuel) with Dave Burrell, Claude Delcloo (de), Earl Freeman, Beb Guérin, Arthur Jones, Grachan Moncur III, Sunny Murray, Archie Shepp
- 1970: The Panther and the Lash with François Tusques (fr), Beb Guérin, Noel McGhie
- 1972: Communications Network (Third World) with Jerome Cooper, Jayne Cortez, Nathan Davis, Jerry Gonzalez, Jay Hoggard, L. Shankar, Sirone
- 1974: The Gardens of Harlem (JCOA) with Roland Alexander, Carla Bley, Pat Patrick, Marvin Peterson, Dewey Redman, Wadada Leo Smith, Bob Stewart, Carlos Ward

=== As sideman ===
With Sun Ra

- Art Forms of Dimensions Tomorrow (Saturn, 1962)

With Marzette Watts

- Marzette Watts and Company (1966)

With Dave Burrell

- Echo (1969)

With Claude Delcloo & Arthur Jones

- Africanasia (1969)

With Sunny Murray

- Homage to Africa (1969)

With Archie Shepp

- Live at the Pan-African Festival (1969)
- Yasmina, a Black Woman (1969)
- Coral Rock (1969)
- Pitchin Can (1969)
- Live in Antibes (1970)
- Attica Blues (1970)
- Black Gipsy (1970)

With Joe McPhee

- At WBAI's Free Music Store, 1971 (HatHut, 1971 [1996])

With Sam Rivers

- Crystals (1974)

With Anthony Braxton

- Reform Art Unit (1977)
- Three Motions With Soloists from Chicago, New York, and Vienna – Impressions (1978)

With Joe Malinga's Mandala

- Tears for the Children of Soweto (1980) and re-released 1990 on Ithi Gqi
