= Ralph Irizarry =

American musical artist (1954–2021)

- Born: 18 July 1954; Harlem, New York, United States
- Died: 5 September 2021 (aged 67); Brooklyn, New York, United States
- Genres: Latin Jazz
- Occupation(s): Musician, bandleader
- Instrument(s): Timbales and various percussion
- Years active: 1974–2021
- Labels: Shanachie, BKS, Truth Revolution Records
- Formerly of: Timbalaye, SonCafe
- Website: soncafe.net

Ralph Irizarry (18 July 1954 – 5 September 2021) was an American percussionist, bandleader, and studio musician who has played on jingles, film and television scores, and whose distinctive playing style has made an indelible mark on those artists with whom he has performed. In addition, he has performed, recorded, and toured with the likes of Harry Belafonte, David Byrne, Celia Cruz, Paquito D'Rivera, Juan Luis Guerra, Earl Klugh, Israel Lopez "Cachao", Wynton Marsalis, Paul Simon and many others. Irizarry has also appeared on the Johnny Carson Show and the David Letterman Show, as well as Don Francisco's Sabado Gigante and Raul Velasco's Siempre en Domingo. Irizarry was featured in the film The Mambo Kings and in documentaries such as Belafonte's Routes of Rhythm, Cachao's Como Mi Ritmo No Hay Dos and The Life of Rubén Blades.

== Biography ==
Ralph Irizarry was born in New York's Spanish Harlem on 18 July 1954 to Puerto Rican parents; his family first moved to Brooklyn and then briefly to Queens, before finally relocating in Puerto Rico in 1970. There, he spent three years gaining musical training and experience, and eventually joined Ponce's La Terrifica, as well as playing with El Gran Combo and Sonora Poncena.

In 1974, Ralph Irizarry returned to New York City to pursue a career as a professional musician. After playing with local groups for almost four years, his break finally came when Ray Barretto invited him to join his orchestra. Shortly afterward they were in studio recording the first of six productions. In April 1983, Rubén Blades invited Irizarry to join in the formation of Seis Del Solar. This association lasted for fourteen years and consisted of intense performing and traveling as well as the production of eight recordings. After Blades left and with his encouragement, the group continued performing and recorded two Latin jazz albums.

In 1996, Ralph Irizarry created his own Latin jazz project - Timbalaye - a septet with a different instrumental format: Latin percussion instruments instead of the typical drum set. Timbalaye's repertoire combines contemporary jazz sounds with rhythmic elements from all over Latin America and Africa, as well as Cuba and Puerto Rico. Two years after the group's inception came their first release, Ralph Irizarry and Timbalaye. "Best Kept Secret", their second album, produced equal results in 2000, and "It's Time" was released in 2003.

Irizarry died on 5 September 2021 at the age of 67 in a hospital in Brooklyn due to multiple organ failure caused by the bacterial infection in his lungs which led to septic shock.

== Discography ==
- 1998: Timbalaye
- 2000: Best Kept Secret (Timbalaye)
- 2004: It's Time (Timbalaye)
- 2006: Tributo
- 2007: Bailando Con Azucar (SonCafe)
- 2007: Tributo (SonCafe)
- 2012: Viejos Peros Sabrosos (Los Viejo De La Salsa)
- 2015: 20th Anniversary (Timbalaye)
