= Crossroads (Jerry González album) =

Studio album by Jerry González
- Released: 1994
- Label: Milestone
- Producer: Todd Barkan

Jerry González chronology
Moliendo Café (1991)	Crossroads (1994)	Pensativo (1995)

Crossroads is an album by the American musician Jerry González, released in 1994. He is credited with his Fort Apache Band. The album was nominated for a Grammy Award for "Best Latin Jazz Performance".

== Production ==
Crossroads was produced by Todd Barkan. Steve Berrios played on the album, as did John Stubblefield. "Lament" is a cover of the J.J. Johnson song; "Fort Apache" is a cover of the Jackie McLean song. "Thelingus" is a tribute to Thelonious Monk, Duke Ellington, and Charles Mingus.

== Critical reception ==
Professional ratings
Review scores
Source	Rating
AllMusic	3/5 stars
DownBeat	4/5 stars
The Encyclopedia of Popular Music	4/5 stars
MusicHound World: The Essential Album Guide	5/5 stars

The Edmonton Journal wrote that the band is "equally adept at diving into bop arrangements, ballads and Afro-Cuban rhythmic patterns with considerable zeal." The Times Colonist called the band "the world's premier Latin jazz group," and praised the "great writing, dynamic soloing ... thoughtful arranging, and fiery rhythmic grounding."

The Toronto Star deemed the album "Afro-Cubop at its best, a live-wire 12 tracks mixing rumba and riff, Western horns with fierce Latin rhythms over constant percussive cutting sessions." The News & Observer praised the "baked-in-coals rhythm section." The Wichita Eagle declared: "Perhaps today's best blend of Afro-Cuban music and jazz, this 15-year-old sextet is stunning as it roars through a varied program."

AllMusic wrote that the band "somewhat de-emphasizes the Latin side of its music in favor of swinging hard bop."

== Track listing ==
No.	Title	Length
1.	"Malandro"
2.	"Rumba Columbia I"
3.	"The Vonce"
4.	"Thelingus"
5.	"Guaguanco I"
6.	"Ezekiel Saw the Wheel"
7.	"Rumba Columbia II"
8.	"Viva Cepeda"
9.	"Lament"
10.	"Guaguanco II"
11.	"Fort Apache"
12.	"Elegua"
