= Jerry González =

American musician, newyorican (1949–2018)

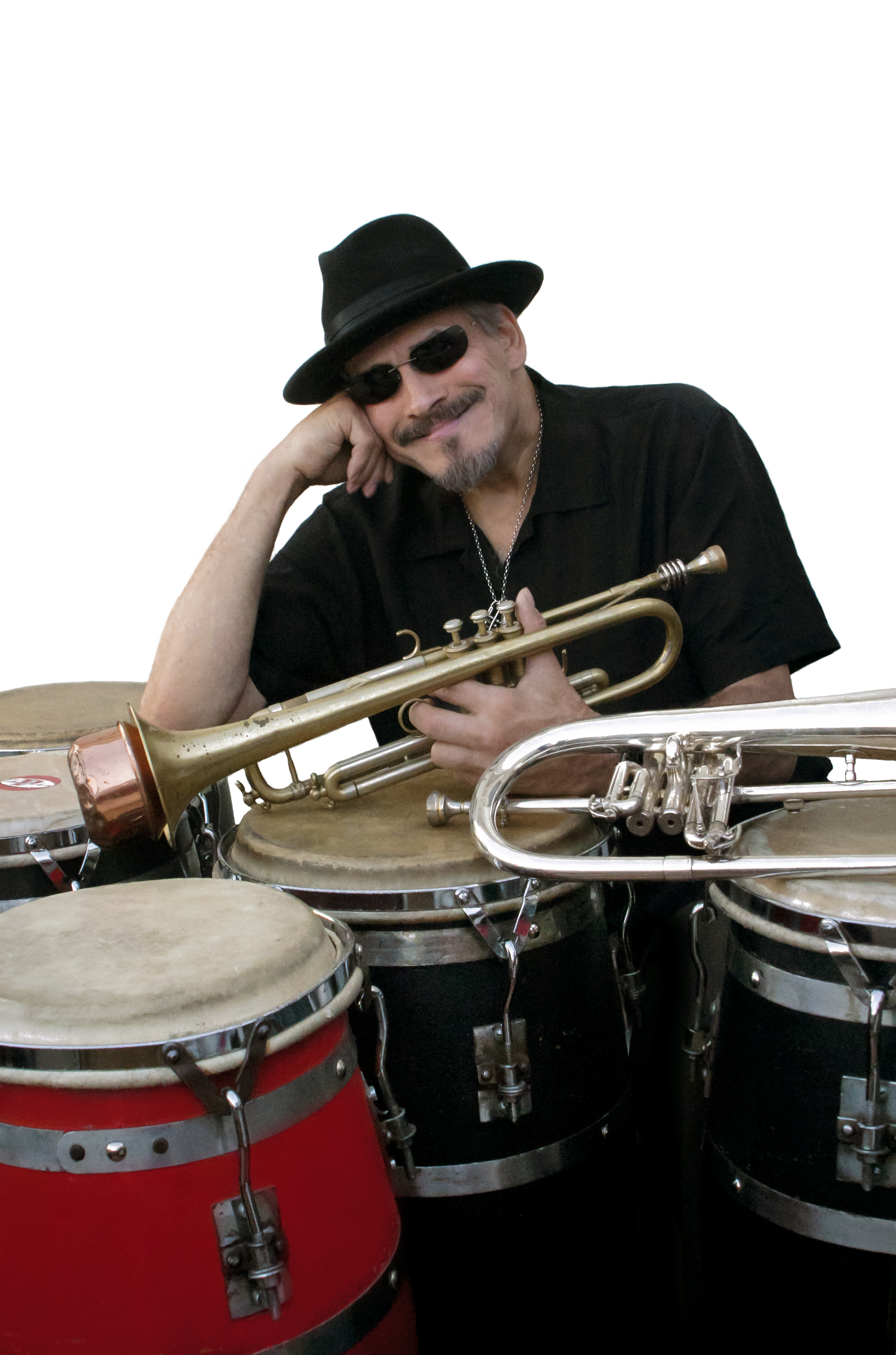

Background information
- Born: Gerald González; June 5, 1949; Manhattan, New York, U.S.
- Origin: The Bronx, New York, U.S.
- Died: October 1, 2018 (aged 69) Madrid, Spain
- Genres: Afro-Puerto Rican Jazz, Afro-Cuban jazz, Latin Jazz
- Occupations: Musician, composer, arranger
- Instruments: Trumpet, flugelhorn, congas
- Formerly of: Conjunto Folklórico y Experimental Nuevayorkino; Eddie Palmieri; Manny Oquendo; Batacumbele; The Fort Apache Band; Los Piratas del Flamenco; El Comando de la Clave

Jerry González (June 5, 1949 – October 1, 2018) was an American bandleader, trumpeter and percussionist of Puerto Rican descent. Together with his brother, bassist Andy González, Jerry Gonzalez played an important role in the development of Latin Jazz during the late 20th century. During the 1970s, both brothers played alongside Eddie Palmieri and in Manny Oquendo's Conjunto Libre, and from 1980 to 2018 they directed The Fort Apache Band. From 2000 to 2018, Jerry González resided in Madrid, where he fronted Los Piratas del Flamenco and El Comando de la Clave. In October 2018, he died of a heart attack after a fire in his home in Madrid.

== Biography ==
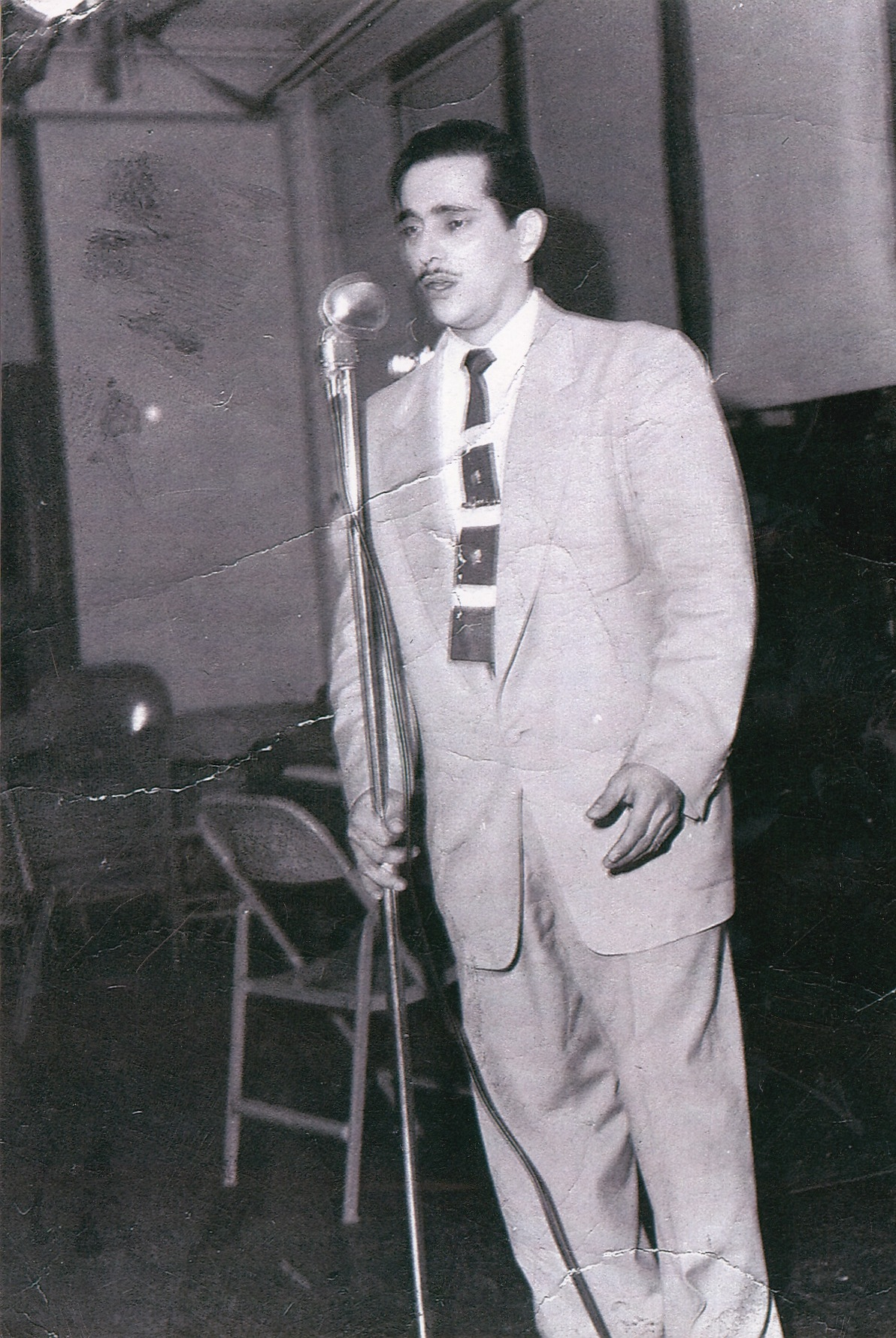
Jerry González Sr. singing in the 1940s.

=== Early life and career ===
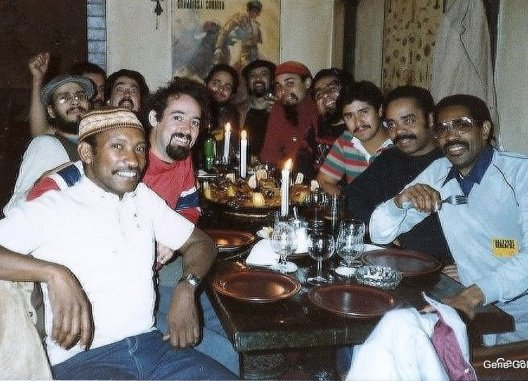
The original members of The Fort Apache Band.

Jerry González was born in 1949 in Manhattan, on 158th Street and 3rd Avenue, and moved to the Edenwald Houses in the Edenwald section of Eastchester, The Bronx at the age of four. He was raised in a strong musical atmosphere, with the strains of Latin, Afro-Cuban and jazz music always in his ear, establishing his musical appreciation and molding his future work as an artist. His father, Jerry González Sr., was a master of ceremonies and lead singer for bands during the Palladium era and sang with musicians such as Claudio Ferrer. In junior high school he began playing trumpet and congas and jamming with local bands. After deciding this was his calling, González completed his formal studies at New York College of Music and New York University. He started his professional career playing with Lewellyn Mathews in the 1964 New York World's Fair. In 1970 he started playing congas with Dizzy Gillespie. With Gillespie's support and encouragement, González was able to fuse the African-based rhythms onto jazz elements without compromising the essence of either.

The next year, González joined Eddie Palmieri's band until 1974, when he moved on to work with Conjunto Libre, the band led by timbalero Manny Oquendo and Jerry's brother, bassist Andy González. He and his brother Andy were the founders of the Conjunto Anabacoa and later of the charismatic Grupo Folklórico y Experimental Nuevayorquino with whom he recorded two LP albums: Concepts of Unity (1974) and Lo Dice Todo (1975). The band members were Jerry and Andy González, Frankie Rodríguez, Milton Cardona, Gene Golden, Carlos Mestre, Nelson González, Manny Oquendo, Óscar Hernández, José Rodríguez, Gonzalo Fernández, Alfredo "Chocolate" Armenteros, Willy García, Heny Álvarez, Virgilio Martí, Marcelino Guerra, Rubén Blades, Orlando "Puntilla" Rios and Julito Collazo.

He played with Tito Puente's ensemble (1984 to 1999), McCoy Tyner's band (1984 to 1990), and Jaco Pastorius's band (1984 to 1987).

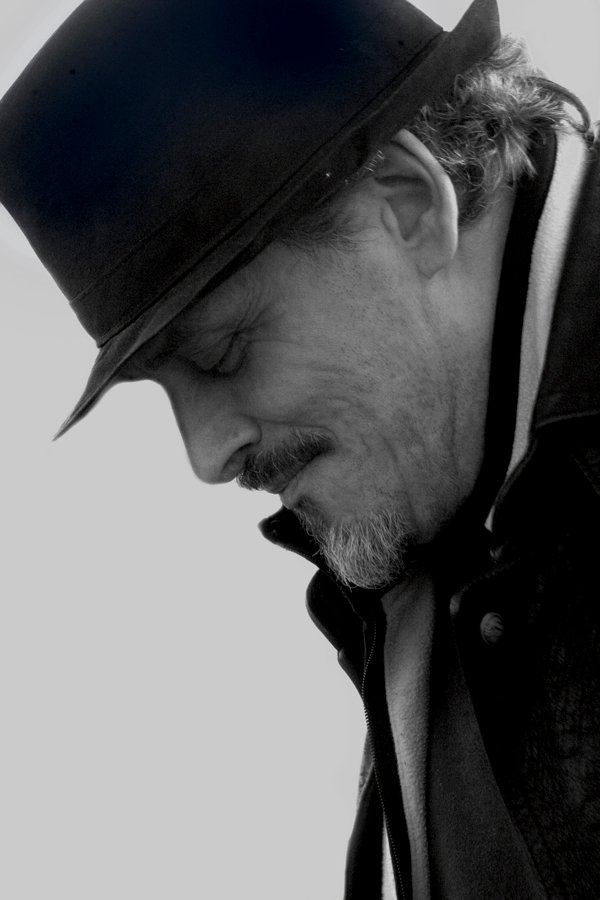
González in 2011

=== The Fort Apache Band ===
In 1980, González published his first album as a leader: Ya yo me curé. Soon he formed his best-known group, The Fort Apache Band, which included his brother Andy and Kenny Kirkland, Sonny Fortune, Nicky Marrero, Milton Cardona, Papo Vázquez, Wilfredo Velez and the late Jorge Dalto. The ensembles' first two albums were recorded live at European jazz festivals, The River is Deep in 1982 in Berlin and Obatalá in 1988 in Zurich. These were followed by their hit album, Rumba Para Monk, in 1988, earning them recognition from the French Academie du Jazz with the Jazz Record of the Year award. This was the record that caught the ears of the jazz community, and is still considered a stellar project. After that, the 15 member band was compressed into a sextet: Larry Willis (piano), Andy González (bass), Steve Berrios (drums) and Carter Jefferson (saxophone) and Joe Ford (saxophone).

González and the band subsequently released Earthdance (Sunnyside, 1990) and Moliendo Café (Sunnyside, 1991). These albums again demonstrated the band's ability to play Latin inspired jazz with genuine sensitivity and virtuosity. After Moliendo Café, Carter Jefferson died and was replaced by John Stubblefield. They then released Crossroads in 1994 and Pensativo in 1995, each of which earned them Grammy nominations. The ensemble was awarded The Beyond Group of the Year by both DownBeat magazine reader's and critic's polls in 1995 and 1996.

González and group continued their creations on the 1996 album Fire Dance, recorded live at Blues Alley, and featuring interpretations of Thelonious Monk songs "Let's Call This" and "Ugly Beauty", as well as original compositions. Their efforts were celebrated by winning a score of awards, including Best Jazz Group in Playboy Magazine's Readers Poll for 1997. In 1998 they swept the Latin Jazz category at the New York Jazz Awards, winning both the Industry and Journalist Polls. In 1999, the group scored big with the critics and readers polls for Beyond Group of The Year in DownBeat magazine.

Jerry González & the Fort Apache Band offered a tribute to Art Blakey and the Jazz Messengers on their 2005 release Rumba Buhaina. That was their first record as a quintet, without John Stubblefield, who died in 2005.

In 2008, the Heineken Festival paid tribute to Jerry González and his brother Andy, the first Puerto Ricans to be honored by the Heineken Festival. In October 2011, the Grammy awarded Arturo O'Farrill's Afro Latin Jazz Orchestra paid tribute to Jerry and Andy at the Symphony Space Theater.

=== His years in Spain ===
González's popularity rose after his contribution to the documentary film Calle 54, directed by the Oscar-awarded Fernando Trueba, where the main names of Latin jazz participated: Tito Puente, Paquito D’Rivera, Gato Barbieri, Chucho Valdés, Dave Valentín, and Israel "Cachao" López. This was not the only collaboration of González in films, as he participated in Crossover Dreams (León Ichaso, 1985) with Rubén Blades and Virgilio Martí, Piñero (León Ichaso, 2001), and episodes of Sesame Street. After the premiere of Calle 54 in 2000, González relocated to Madrid. The trumpeter went there for just one day during the tour with Calle 54 and ended up living there. He immersed himself in the flamenco scene and started to develop a new concept with the genre that would blossom in the future.

His hiatus in Madrid resulted in the production of Los Piratas del Flamenco (2004), a band and album that included the flamenco guitarist Niño Josele, the percussionist Israel Suárez "Piraña" and the singer Diego El Cigala. A novel approach is evident, as it was done without bass, without drums or piano, a radically new sound, a fusion of jazz and flamenco but with a twist. The album was nominated for the Grammy Awards as best Latin jazz album and won the Critics Award in New York as best Latin-jazz album of the year. He has also played with other flamenco musicians such as Enrique Morente, Paco de Lucía, Javier Limón and Jorge Pardo, copla musicians such as Martirio and pop musicians living in Spain, including the Argentinean Andrés Calamaro.

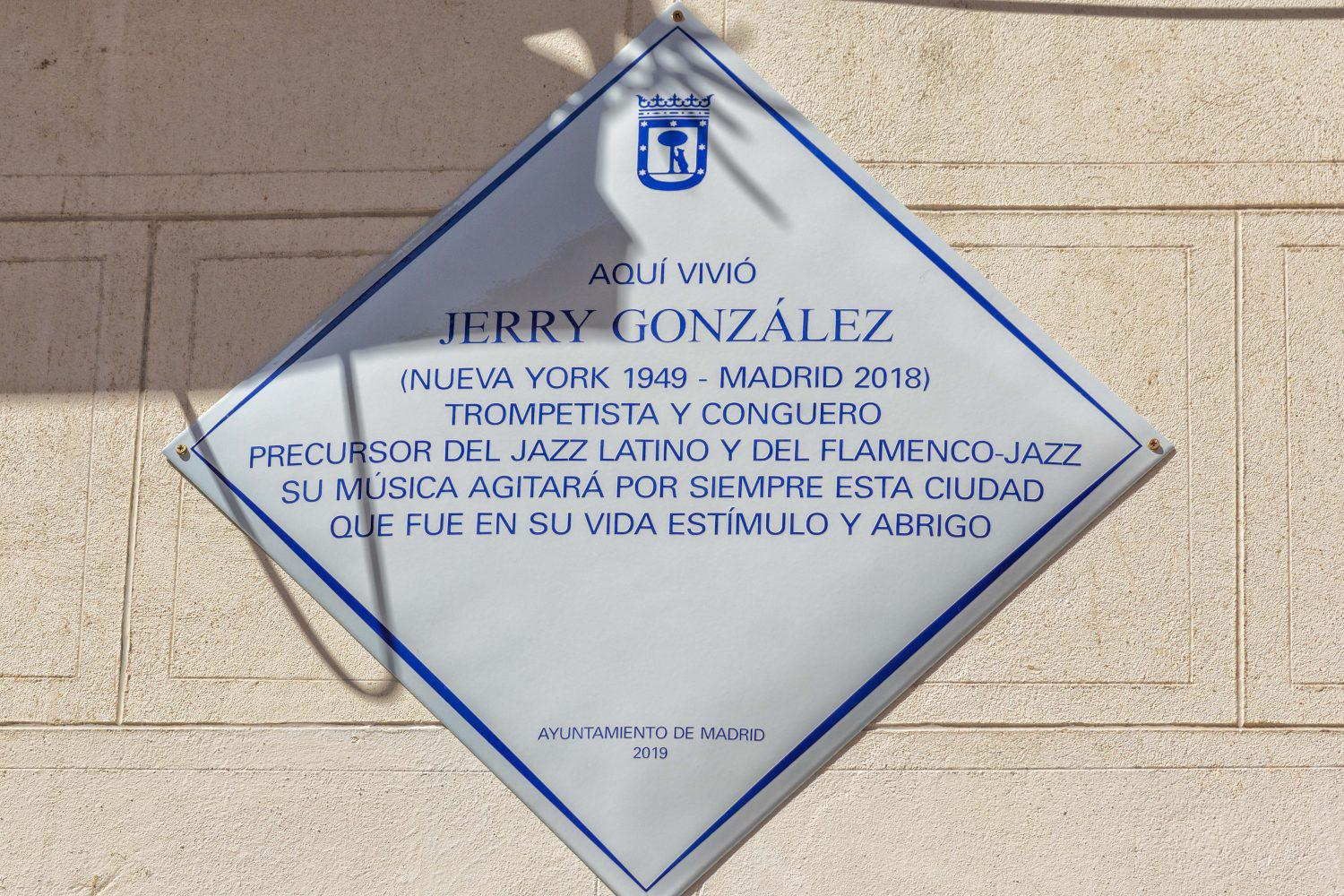
Commemorative plaque to González in Madrid

González's latest albums have been A primera vista (duet with Federico Lechner, 2002), Music for Big Band (Youkali/Universal, 2006) and Avísale a mi contrario que aquí estoy yo (Cigala Music, 2010), recorded with El Comando de la Clave, Jerry's quartet in Spain, which includes the Cubans Alain Pérez (bass), Javier Massó "Caramelo" (piano) and Kiki Ferrer (drums). It was nominated as best Jazz album in the Spanish Music Awards. The American edition of this album was called Jerry González y el Comando de la Clave (Sunnyside, 2011) and was nominated for the Latin Grammy Awards as Best Latin Jazz Album and was voted Best Latin Jazz Album of the Year 2011 by jazz critics Ted Panken (DownBeat magazine) and Doug Ramsey.

In 2010, González was given the "Latino of the Year Award" in the 100 Latinos Awards-Madrid.

His next releases were an album with the Spanish contrabass player Javier Colina, a duet album with the flamenco guitarist Niño Josele and a Fort Apache album recorded live at the Blue Note in 2012 for the label Half Note Records.

=== Collaborations ===
In the long run of his career, González performed and recorded with musicians such as Jaco Pastorius, Tito Puente, McCoy Tyner, Dizzy Gillespie, Chet Baker, Eddie Palmieri, Cachao López, Woody Shaw, Tony Williams, Larry Young, Freddie Hubbard, Brooklyn Philharmonic, Archie Shepp, Paco de Lucía, George Benson, Chico O'Farrill, The Beach Boys, Papo Vázquez, Ray Barretto, Bobby Paunetto, Chocolate Armenteros, Hilton Ruíz, Kirk Lightsey, Chico Freeman, Don Moye, José "Chombo" Silva, Rashied Ali, Paquito D'Rivera, Kenny Vance, Diego El Cigala, Enrique Morente, Santi Debriano and Steve Turre.

== Discography ==
As a leader

- Ya Yo Me Curé (American Clavé/Sunnyside, 1980)
- The River Is Deep (Enja, 1982)
- Obatalá (Enja, 1988)
- Rumba Para Monk (Sunnyside, 1988)
- Earthdance (Sunnyside, 1990)
- Moliendo Café (Sunnyside, 1991)
- Crossroads (Milestone, 1994)
- Pensativo (Milestone, 1995)
- Fire Dance (Milestone, 1996)
- Jerry González & The Fort Apache Band: Live (1996)
- Calle 54 (Calle 54, 2000)
- Jerry González & Federico Lechner: A Primera Vista (2002)
- Jerry González & Los Piratas del Flamenco (Lola Records/Sunnyside, 2004)
- Rumba Buhaina (Sunnyside, 2005)
- Music For A Big Band (Youkali/Universal, 2006)
- Avísale a Mi Contrario que Aquí Estoy Yo (Cigala Music/Warner, 2010)
- Jerry González y El Comando de La Clavé (Sunnyside, 2011)
- Jerry González & Miguel Blanco Big Band: A Tribute to the Fort Apache Band (Youkali, 2014)

As sideman

- George Benson: The Other Side of Abbey Road (A&M/CTI, 1969)
- Bobby Paunetto: Commit to Memory (Pathfinder/Tonga, 1970/1976)
- Dizzy Gillespie: Portrait of Jenny (Perception, 1970)
- Clifford Thornton: Communications Network (Third World, 1972)
- Houston Person: Island Episode (Prestige, 1973)
- Eddie Palmieri: Sentido (1973)
- Clifford Thornton: The Gardens of Harlem (JCOA, 1974)
- Eddie Palmieri: Unfinished Masterpiece (Coco/MPL, 1974)
- Bobby Paunetto: Paunetto's Point (Pathfinder/Toga, 1974)
- Charlie Palmieri: Impulsos (Coco/MPL, 1975)
- Grupo Folklórico y Experimental Nuevayorkino: Concepts of Unity (Salsoul, 1975)
- Grupo Folklórico y Experimental Nuevayorkino: Lo Dice Todo (Salsoul, 1976)
- Paquito D'Rivera: Blowin' (Columbia, 1981)
- Totico: Totico y Sus Rumberos (Montuno, 1981)
- Kip Hanrahan: Coup de Tête (American Clavé, 1981)
- McCoy Tyner: Looking Out (Columbia, 1982)
- Kip Hanrahan: Desire Develops An Edge (American Clavé, 1981)
- Tito Puente: On Broadway (Concord Picante, 1982)
- Abbey Lincoln: Talking To The Sun (Enja, 1983)
- Kirk Lightsey: Isotope (Criss Cross, 1983)
- Jaco Pastorius: Live In New York, Vol. I & III (Big World, 1985)
- Carlos "Patato" Valdés: Masterpiece (Messidor, 1984)
- Virgilio Martí: Saludos a Los Rumberos (Caimán, 1984)
- Jaco Pastorius: Punk Jazz (Big World, 1986)
- Soundtrack of the motion picture: Crossover Dreams (Elektra, 1986)
- Franco Ambrosetti: Movies (Enja, 1987)
- Hilton Ruiz: El Camino (RCA/BMG/Novus, 1987)
- Steve Turré: Viewpoints on Vibrations (Stash, 1987)
- Santi Debriano: Obeah (Free Lance, 1987)
- Kip Hanrahan: Days and Nights of Blue Luck Inverted (American Clavé, 1987)
- Steve Turré: Fire and Ice (Stash, 1988)
- Kenny Vance: The Performer (Rockaway/Gold Castle, 1988) https://web.archive.org/web/20120330222429/http://www.kennyvance.com/vid13performer.html
- Larry Willis: Heavy Blue (Steeplechase, 1989)
- Kirk Lightsey: Everything Is Changed (Sunnyside, 1989)
- McCoy Tyner: The Turning Point (Birdology, 1991)
- Charles Fambrough: The Proper Angle (CTI, 1991)
- Kenny Kirkland: Kenny Kirkland (GRP, 1991)
- Dave Valentin: Tropic Heat (GRP, 1993)
- Bobby Hutcherson: Acoustic Masters II (Atlantic, 1993)
- McCoy Tyner: Journey (Birdology, 1993)
- Hilton Ruiz: Heroes (Telarc, 1993)
- Don Byron: Don Byron Plays the Music of Mickey Katz (Nonesuch, 1993)
- David Sánchez: Sketches of Dreams (Columbia, 1994)
- Sonny Fortune: A Better Understanding (Blue Note, 1995)
- Don Byron: Music for Six Musicians (Elektra, 1995)
- Afro Blue Band: Impressions (Milestone, 1995)
- Chico O'Farrill: Pure Emotion (Milestone, 1995)
- Giovanni Hidalgo: Time Shifter (Tropijazz, 1996)
- Bobby Matos: Footprints (Cubop, 1996)
- Abbey Lincoln: You and I (Jazzfest, 1997)
- Deep Rumba: The Music of Marlon Simon (K-Jazz, 1998)
- Arturo O'Farrill: Blood Lines (Milestone, 1999)
- Batacumbele: Hijos de Tambó (Batá, 1999)
- Rumbajazz: Tribute To Chombo (Sunnyside, 1999)
- Abbey Lincoln: Over the Years (Verve, 2000)
- Diego "El Cigala": Corren Tiempos de Alegría (2001)
- Andrés Calamaro: Tinta Roja (2001)
- Martirio: Mucho Corazón (2001)
- Enrique Morente: Pequeño Reloj (Virgin/EMI, 2003)
- Paco de Lucía: Cositas Buenas (2004)
- Diego "El Cigala": Picasso en Mis Ojos (2005)
- Lierhouse Project: Siegfrieds Olé In Spain (2005)
- Niño Josele: Paz (2006)
- Diego Amador: "El Aire de Lo Puro" (2006)
- Javier Limón: La Tierra del Agua (2007)
- Javier Limón: Son de Limón (2008)
- Andrés Calamaro: Obras Incompletas (2009)
- Andrés Calamaro: On The Rock (2010)
- Alain Pérez: Apetecible (2010)

== Filmography ==
- Crossover Dreams (Leon Ichaso, 1985)
- Calle 54 (Fernando Trueba, 2000)
- Piñero (Leon Ichaso, 2001)
