= Papo Vázquez =

American musician, trombonist, composer, arranger and bandleader

- Born: February 24, 1958 (age 68); Philadelphia, Pennsylvania
- Genres: Latin; Latin jazz; jazz; Afro-Caribbean jazz
- Years active: 1973–present
- Labels: Picaro; CuBop; Timeless
- Formerly of: Batacumbele
- Website: www.papovazquez.com

Angel Rafael "Papo" Vázquez is an American trombonist, composer, arranger, and bandleader of Puerto Rican descent who performs and records jazz, Latin and Afro-Caribbean music. He is known as one of the pioneers of the bomba jazz style and is a Grammy Award nominee. 2024 New York Emmy Awards nominated for Musical Composition/Arrangement National Puerto Rican Day Parade Orchestra BARD Entertainment In 2011 Teatro Pregones, Bronx NY presented Papo Vazquez an NEA Master Artist award.

== Early life and start of career ==
Vázquez was born in 1958 in Philadelphia, Pennsylvania. When he was five years old, his family moved to his parents' native Puerto Rico, where he spent the next five or six years being influenced by music-loving relatives and immersed in the native sounds of the island. At age 13 he bought his first instrument, a used trombone for $5.

That same year, back in Philadelphia, still at age 13, listening to live music by sneaking into local church dances, he began playing professionally, his guitarist uncle having gotten him his first gig. His grandfather, father, and uncle were troubadours and all three played the Puerto Rican folk style música jíbara.

At 15, Vázquez was performing with local Philadelphia Latin bands and opening acts for visiting artists from New York City such as Larry Harlow. He made his recording debut with Larry Harlow at age 16 and his second recording with the experimental New York group Conjunto Libre. He dropped out of Mastbaum Vocation School in 11th grade in order to be able to commute to his New York City gig with Harlow's salsa band. Subsequently he got his GED certificate and attended two semesters in the music department at City College of New York.

== 1970s and New York City ==
In 1975, at age 17, Vázquez moved to New York City. Through the late 1970s he was active in the city's Latin jazz scene, playing with salsa greats including Héctor Lavoe, the Fania All-Stars, Ray Barretto, Willie Colón, Rubén Blades, Eddie Palmieri, and Celia Cruz. He studied with trombonist Slide Hampton and later recorded and performed with Hampton's World of Trombones. His 1970s sessions included Colón's Siembra, the first salsa record to sell over a million copies, and Barretto's "Rican/Struction".

== Batacumbele, Fort Apache Band, Bomba Jazz ==
In 1980 he moved back to Puerto Rico for five years to help found the Latin fusion band Batacumbele, which fused Afro-Cuban popular music, Latin jazz, and folkloric polyrhythms from Africa and Puerto Rico. With Batacumbele he performed, composed, arranged and recorded from 1981 to 1985.

In this period Vázquez began experimenting with indigenous Puerto Rican rhythms in the context of jazz, fusing bomba, which arose from traditions brought to Puerto Rico by enslaved Africans, and plena, a modern development of these traditions that often features topical or political lyrics, with contemporary jazz.

In 1980 Vázquez also toured Europe briefly with the Ray Charles Orchestra, and about this time was a founding member of Jerry González' Fort Apache Band.

In 1983, to further develop the blending of jazz and indigenous Puerto Rican styles like bomba, he formed his own band, Bomba Jazz. This group later evolved into the band he continues to lead, the Afro-Puerto Rican jazz band Mighty Pirates Troubadours. (A onetime bandmate suggested the name, originally as a joke, because of Vázquez's concern that the name "Bomba Jazz" or "Papo Vázquez Bomba Jazz" suggested stylistic limitations.)

== With Tito Puente and Rubén Blades ==
After returning to New York in 1985, Vázquez joined Tito Puente's Latin Jazz Ensemble, traveling with them as principal trombonist. He toured Europe with Dizzy Gillespie's United Nations Orchestra, and worked with Hilton Ruiz and Dave Valentin. He was also a member of Rubén Blades' band Son del Solar, performing at the Playboy Jazz Festival in 1989 and appearing on Blades' Grammy-nominated albums Amor y Control and Caminando and Grammy-winning Antecedente.

== 1990s ==
Vázquez and his band performed his compositions at events such as the Painted Bride's "Latin Vibrations" series in 1990. The Philadelphia Daily News referred to him at this time as "the hottest trombone player on the big-league Latino dance band circuit." In the early part of the decade his Bomba Jazz ensemble included pianist Kenny Kirkland, Andy Gonzalez, Milton Cardona, Edgardo Miranda, and Steve Berrios among others.

Also in the 1990s his music featured in the films The Mambo Kings, Spike Lee's Mo' Better Blues, and the remake of The Thomas Crown Affair.

In 1992 Vázquez released his first album, Breakout, which mixed traditional and Latin jazz as well as bomba, on the Timeless label.

During the 1990s Vázquez performed in Chico O'Farrill's orchestra at Jazz at Lincoln Center, while his own band included Chico's son Arturo O'Farrill on piano. On 4 February 1994 he performed with his group Bomba Jazz at the Kennedy Center, a venue to which he returned, with the Pirates Troubadours, in July 2015.

The track "Baila Plena" from his 1999 album At The Point V. 1 album was featured on the soundtrack for the film Free Enterprise.

== Grammy nomination, Oasis Project ==
In 2000 he moved to Bronxville in Westchester County, New York, just north of New York City, with his wife. In 2002 he was a founding member of Lincoln Center's Afro-Latin Jazz Orchestra, disbanded all-star group, in which he performed and for which he composed. His piece "Iron Jungle" received special praise.

Vázquez earned a Grammy nomination in 2008 for his recording of his bomba-inspired Papo Vazquez Mighty Pirates: Marooned/Aislado. His album Marooned/Aislado (Picaro) resulted from a grant from The Painted Bride Art Center in Philadelphia which asked him to expand Pirates Troubadours and compose new music for a 19-piece, Afro-Puerto Rican Jazz Orchestra. The 2008 event was recorded live, and the resulting Marooned/Aislado album was nominated for a 2009 Grammy for best Latin jazz recording.

In 2009, he premiered his composition "Oasis" with the Bronx Arts Ensemble. The show expanded to become the Oasis Project, which premiered the following year with the Pregones Theater. His 2013 Oasis album featured guest appearances by Wynton Marsalis and Regina Carter.

On 29 and 30 January 2016 Arturo O'Farrill & the Afro Latin Jazz Orchestra honored Vázquez and other musicians in a "Tribute to the Great Sidemen of Latin Jazz" concert at Symphony Space in New York City. Since 2016 he has been the musical director for the National Puerto Rican Day Parade Orchestra in New York City.

During the COVID-19 pandemic, with live performances canceled, he recorded his 10th album, a jazz release called Chapter 10: Breaking Cover, with his band Mighty Pirates Troubadours and liner notes by Ben Ratliff of The New York Times. NPR recognized the album in the Latin category of its "Best Music of 2020" Jazz Critics poll.

== Discography ==
=== As leader ===
- Breakout (1992)
- At the Point V. 1 (1999)
- At the Point V. 2 (2000)
- Papo Vázquez Pirates Troubadours: Carnival In San Juan (2003)
- Papo Vázquez Pirates Troubadours: From the Badlands (2007)
- Papo Vázquez Pirates Troubadours: Marooned/Aislado (Picaro, 2008)
- Papo Vázquez Pirates Troubadours: Oasis (Picaro, 2012)
- Papo Vázquez Mighty Pirates Troubadours: Spirit Warrior (Picaro, 2014)
- GV: Johann Sebastian Bach (Picaro, 2017)
- Chapter 10: Breaking Cover (Picaro, 2020)
- Songs del Yukayeke (Picaro, 2024)

=== As guest ===
- Héctor Lavoe, De Ti Depende, Fania (1976)
- Willie Colón and Rubén Blades, Siembra (Fania, 1978)
- Batacumbele, Con Un Poco De Songo (1981)
- Batacumbele, En Aquellos Tiempos (1983)
- Rubén Blades, Antecedente (1988), Grammy Award
- Jerry González, Obatala Enja (1989)
- Mo' Better Blues (soundtrack) (1990)
- Tito Puente, Out of This World (Concord Picante, 1990)
- Rubén Blades, Caminando (1991)
- Hilton Ruiz, Manhattan Mambo (Telarc, 1992)
- Descarga Boriqua, Tierazzo (1993)
- Dave Valentin, Tropic Heat (1994)
- Manny Oquendo & Libre, Mejor Que Nunca, Milestone (1994)
- New York Latin Jazz Allstars, Feliz Navidad (2000)
- Wayne Shorter, Alegría (2003)
- Bebo Valdés, Bebo de Cuba (2004)
- Freddie Cole, Rio de Janeiro Blues (Telarc, 2006)
- Chico O'Farrill, Pure Emotion (Fantasy, 2006)
- Ray Barretto, Standards Rican-Ditioned (Zoho Music, 2006)
- Shakira & Wyclef Jean, "Bamboo" (2006)
- Tego Calderón, The Underdog/El Subestimado (Jiggiri (2006)
- Niño Josele, Española (Raíces, 2009)
