= Abraham Kobena Adzenyah =

Fante Master Drummer and ethnomusicologist

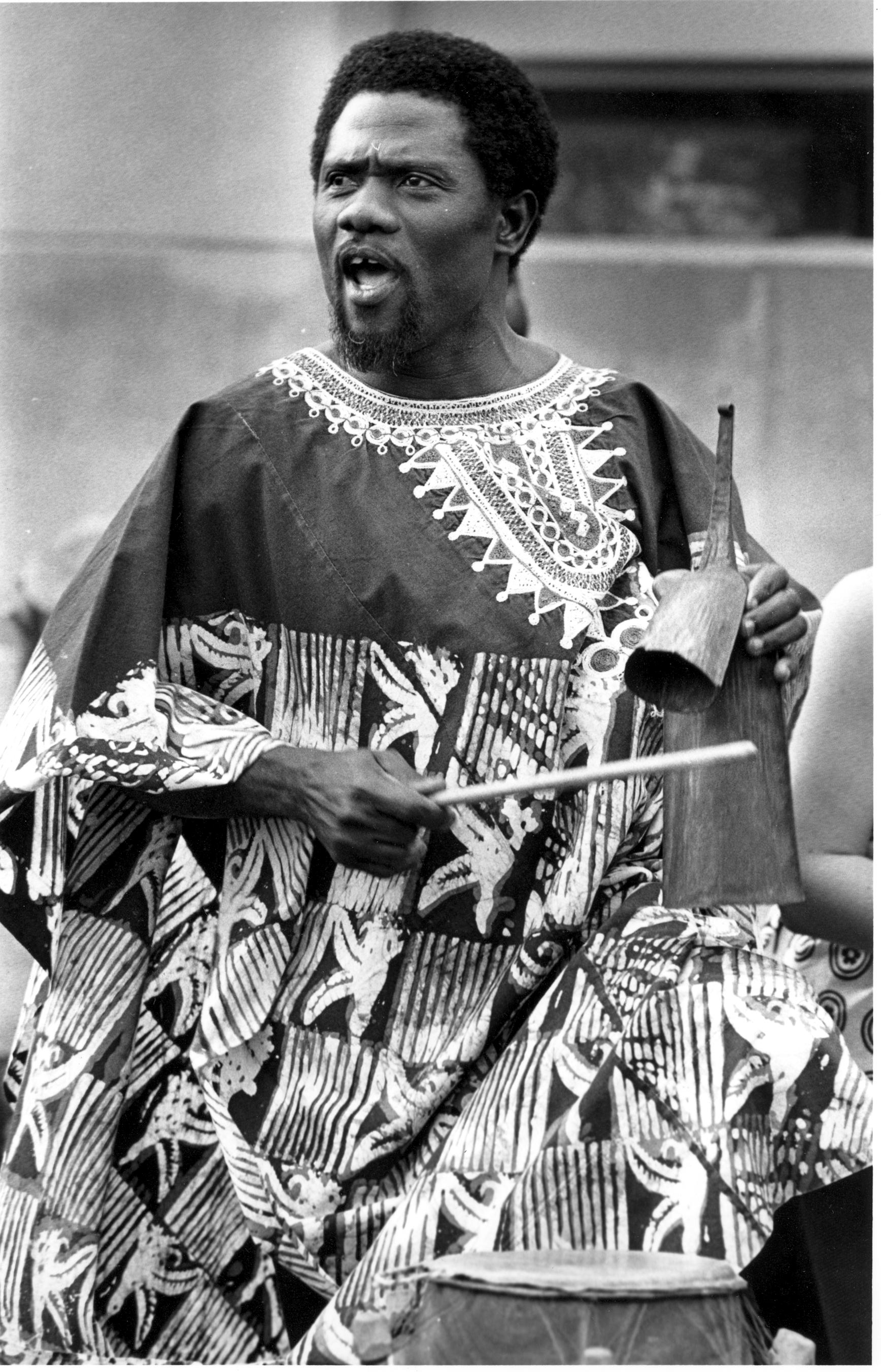
Abraham K. Adzenyah leading an ensemble at Wesleyan University in Middletown, CT.

Abraham Kobena Adzenyah is a Fante Master Drummer, percussionist, ethnomusicologist, and educator from Agona Swedru, Ghana. After serving as a music, dance, and drama instructor at the University of Ghana (1964–1969), Adzenyah spent over forty years as an Adjunct Professor of West African Music, Culture and Dance at Wesleyan University, in Middletown, Connecticut (1969–2016). He has recorded and performed with artists such as Steve Reich, Anthony Braxton, Steve Gadd, Jayne Cortez, and the Ghana Dance Ensemble, with whom he performed at the 1968 Summer Olympics in Mexico City, Mexico. Adzenyah has also co-published two books on Ghanaian percussion methodology and performance.

== Early life ==
Abraham Adzenyah was born in 1939 in Agona, Swedru, Ghana. He is the third Master Drummer in his family, following a patrilineal line which began with his great-grandfather. Adzenyah began his professional career studying, performing, and teaching at the Institute of African Studies at the University of Ghana where he receiving formal, institutional instruction in music, dance, and drama. Adzenyah left the university to tour with Ghana's National Dance Ensemble in 1968 and was one of the first drummers given the prestigious title of Master Drummer in the Ensemble.

While on tour with the Ensemble, one of the founders of Wesleyan's World Music Program, Dr. Robert E. Brown, heard Adzenyah playing in New York City's Madison Square Garden. It was after seeing this performance that he recruited Adzenyah to teach at Wesleyan University, a position he would go on to hold for decades. Upon arriving at Wesleyan in 1969, Adzenyah began instructing courses in West African music, dance, and culture—which, over the course of his tenure, he did alongside other Ghanaian artists such as Freeman Kwadzo Donkor and Emanuel Duodu.

His expertise as a Master Drummer (primarily in the Ewe Drumming tradition), with its emphasis on interlocking, polyrhythmic structures, as well as its cultural connection to the histories and peoples of Ghana, allowed him to fit into and advance the blossoming World Music and Ethnomusicology programs which began at Wesleyan University in the early 1960's.

Adzenyah received a B.A. in Liberal Arts from Goddard College in 1976, and an M.A. in Music from Wesleyan University in 1979.

== Professorship and career ==
Adzenyah has taught thousands of students both at Wesleyan University and as an artist in residence. Outside of the university, Adzenyah led classes at numerous public schools in Connecticut (through the Connecticut Commission on the Arts), has attended workshops, and been a distinguished guest at conservatories across the country, including the Jazz workshop at the Banff Centre for Arts and Creativity in Alberta, Canada, which he first attended in 1986.

Many of Adzenyah's students have gone on to teach and run Ghanaian drum and dance ensembles at other colleges and universities, including the Berklee College of Music, Brandeis University, The Hartt School of Music, Lehman College, Montclair State University, Mount Holyoke College, Oakland University (Michigan), Princeton University, SUNY Binghamton, SUNY Stonybrook, University of Toronto, Tufts University, University of Alabama, University of Massachusetts Dartmouth, Yale University, and York University (Toronto).

Adzenyah's musical prowess has brought him all over the world, playing with musicians like Hugh Masekela, Steve Gadd (as a member of the Nexus percussion ensemble), Dizzy Gillespie, Tito Puente, Mongo Santamaria, Ornette Coleman, Max Roach, Dave Holland, Rufus Reid, as well as Ed Blackwell (Wesleyan's Artist in Residence until his death in 1992), and Wesleyan's Professor of Music Emeritus, Anthony Braxton. Adzenyah was awarded the Afro-Caribbean World Music Symposium Achievement Award and the Percussive Arts Society Award.

Adzenyah taught West African Music and Culture at Wesleyan University from 1969 until his retirement in May of 2016.

== Recordings ==
=== Discography ===
- On the Edge, Julie Kabat. (Leonarda, LPI 119), 1984.
- Some Day Catch Some Day Down, Talking Drums (Innova), Abraham Adzenyah / David Bindman, 1985.
- Duo (Wesleyan) 1994 - Abraham Adzinyah [sic], Anthony Braxton (Leo Records), 1994.
- Mo Ngye Mo Ani, The New Talking Drums (Self Release), 1998.
- Henry Brant Collection Vol. 4, Henry Brant & Wesleyan University musicians (Innova), 2007.

=== Arrangements ===
Wonfa Nyem - A Song In Akan From Ghana, SATB A Cappella Choral (World Music Press/Plank Road Publishing), 1992.

Reminding listeners of how important it is to be an active part of your community is the purpose of this song from Ghana that is sung at festivals or funerals. As sung by the Akrofor Youth Choir of Ghana, the arrangement by Abraham Adzenyah has a slow start, and an up tempo second section that is reminiscent of New Orleans funeral processions. It allows for small groups or soloists in simple divisi parts. The song has few words, but it is full of meaning. Includes notes, percussion parts, handclaps, and movement suggestions.

=== Publications ===
- Adzenyah, Abraham, Donkor, Freeman, Hartigan, Royal. West African Rhythms for Drumset (Alfred Music) ISBN 978-0-89724-732-0, 1995.
- Adzenyah, Abraham, Cook Tucker, Judith, et al. Let Your Voice Be Heard! Songs from Ghana and Zimbabwe (World Music Press), ISBN 978-0-937203-75-0, 1997.

=== Performances ===
- Nexus Percussion at Expo 86, World Drums concert at Expo '86 in Vancouver, July, 1986.
- Nexus Percussion, Abraham Adzenyah, Steve Gadd, and Samulnor, Super Percussion at Tokyo Music Joy, 1988.
