= Anthony Jackson (musician) =

American bassist (1952–2025)

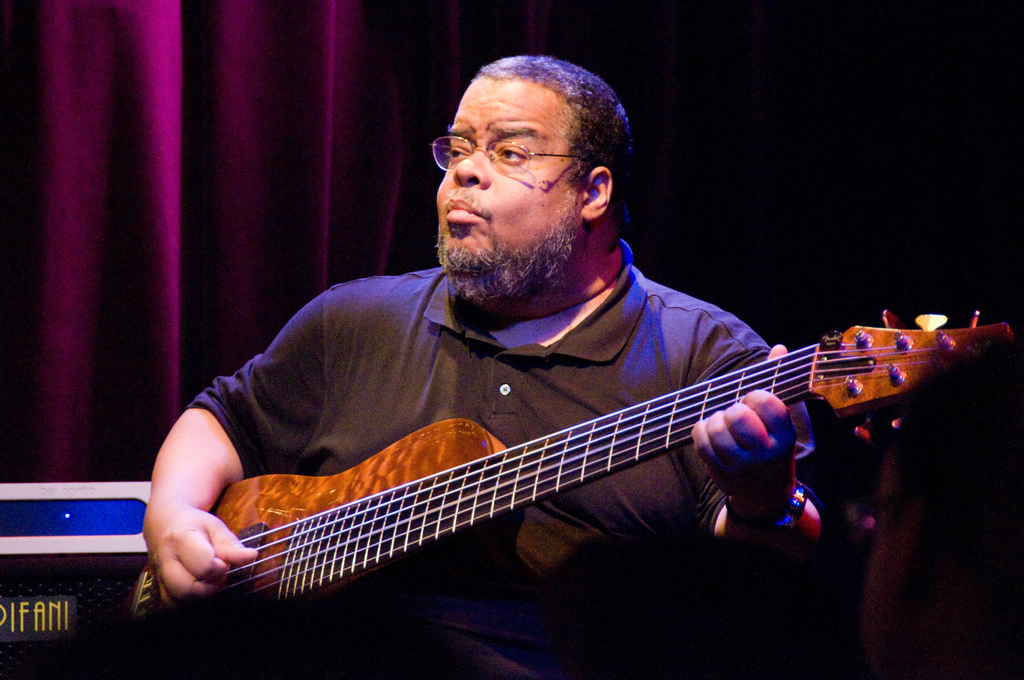
- Jackson in 2007

Background information
- Born: Anthony Claiborne Jackson; June 23, 1952; New York City, U.S.
- Died: October 19, 2025 (aged 73) Staten Island, New York City, U.S.
- Genres: Jazz; jazz fusion; R&B; funk
- Occupation: Musician
- Instruments: Electric bass; contrabass guitar
- Years active: 1970–2017

Anthony Claiborne Jackson (June 23, 1952 – October 19, 2025) was an American bassist. Described as "one of the masters of the instrument", he performed as a session musician and live artist. He is also credited with the development of the modern six-string bass, which he referred to as an electric contrabass guitar.

== Background ==
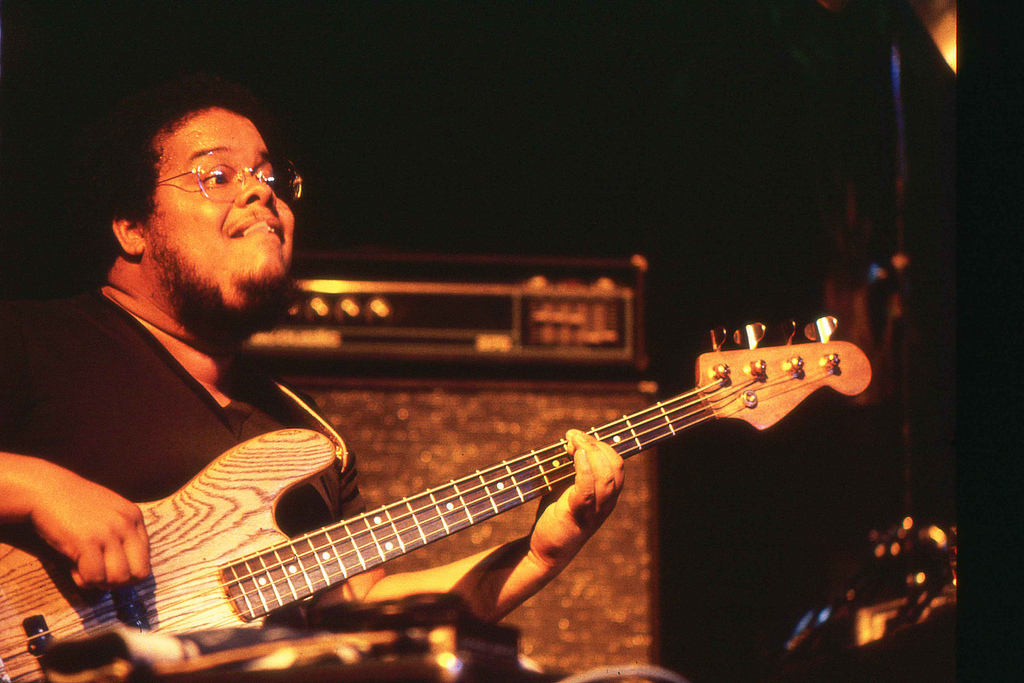
Jackson playing in the Netherlands with Al Di Meola in 1978

Jackson was born in New York City on June 23, 1952. He played piano before starting guitar in his teens. When he turned to bass, he was inspired by James Jamerson and Jack Casady. Jackson worked as a session musician, in the Billy Paul band, and with Philadelphia International Records. Paul’s 1972 hit "Me and Mrs. Jones" was Jackson's first No. 1 record. His performance on "For the Love of Money" by the O'Jays helped move the song to No. 9 on the pop chart and No. 3 on the R&B chart in 1974.

Jackson was a student of Jerry Fisher, Lawrence Lucie, and Pat Martino. He performed live in more than 30 countries and recorded in more than 3,000 sessions on more than 500 albums. In 2016, Jackson missed some performances with Hiromi due to ill health.

== Six-string contrabass guitar ==
Danelectro (1956), Fender (1961) and other manufacturers had produced six-string basses tuned one octave below a guitar (EADGBE), and Jackson had briefly played a Fender five-string bass tuned EADGC. Jackson first approached various luthiers in 1974 about the construction of his idea for a "contrabass guitar" tuned in fourths BEADGC, and Carl Thompson built the first six-string for Jackson in 1975. He first performed on the Thompson-built bass in 1975, recording with Carlos Garnett and touring with Roberta Flack. He later approached luthier Ken Smith to build him a six string bass before finally playing instruments made by New York-based bass makers Fodera.

Jackson said that the idea for adding more strings to the bass guitar came from his frustration with its limited range. When asked what he thought of criticism of the six-string bass, Jackson replied,

Why is four [strings] the standard and not six? As the lowest-pitched member of the guitar family, the instrument should have had six strings from the beginning. The only reason it had four was because Leo Fender was thinking in application terms of an upright bass, but he built it along guitar lines because that was his training. The logical conception for the bass guitar encompasses six strings.

From 1982 onwards Jackson almost exclusively played a contrabass guitar. Prior to 1982 his main instruments included a 1973 Fender Precision Bass, a 1973 Fender Jazz bass fitted with a 1975 Precision neck, and a Gibson EB-2D bass. In 1984 Fodera introduced their first Anthony Jackson Signature Model contrabass, followed in 1989 by a single cutaway model, the Anthony Jackson Presentation Contrabass Guitar.

== Death ==
Jackson died on October 19, 2025, on Staten Island, New York, at the age of 73. He had Parkinson's disease at the time of his death.

== Discography ==
=== As co-leader ===
- Interspirit with Yiorgos Fakanas (Abstract Logix, 2010)

Collaborations
With Michel Petrucciani and Steve Gadd – the same members from Petrucciani's Both Worlds (1997)

- Trio in Tokyo (Dreyfus, 1999) – live rec. 1997

With Steve Khan and Dennis Chambers

- The Suitcase - Live In Köln '94 (ESC, 2008)[2CD] – live rec. 1994 for WDR
- Parting Shot (ESC, 2011) – rec. 2010

=== As a member ===
Easy Pieces
With Steve Ferrone, Renee Geyer and Hamish Stuart

- Easy Pieces (A&M, 1988)

=== As sideman ===
With Patti Austin
- Havana Candy (CTI, 1977)
- Every Home Should Have One (Qwest, 1981)
- In My Life (CTI, 1983)

With Alex Bugnon

- This Time Around (Epic, 1993)
- Tales from the Bright Side (RCA, 1995)
- As Promised (Narada, 2000)

With Michel Camilo

- Why Not? (Electric Bird, 1985)
- In Trio (Electric Bird, 1986)
- Rendezvous (Columbia, 1993)
- One More Once (Columbia, 1994)
- Thru My Eyes (TropiJazz, 1997)
- Triangulo (Telarc, 2002)
- Caribe (Calle 54, 2009)

With Jorge Dalto

- Rendez-Vous (Eastworld, 1983)
- New York Nightline (Eastworld, 1984)
- Listen Up! (Gaia 1988)

With Mandoki Soulmates

- People in Room No. 8 (PolyGram, 1997)
- Soulmates (Paroli, 2002)
- Out of Key...with the Time (Sony, 2002)
- Legends of Rock (Paroli, 2005)
- Aquarelle (NEO, 2009)
- BudaBest (Sony, 2013)

With Al Di Meola

- Land of the Midnight Sun (Columbia, 1976)
- Elegant Gypsy (Columbia, 1977)
- Casino (Columbia, 1978)
- Splendido Hotel (Columbia, 1980)
- Tour de Force (CBS, 1982)
- Electric Rendezvous (Columbia, 1982)
- Tirami Su (EMI-Manhattan, 1987)
- Kiss My Axe (Tomato, 1991)
- Flesh on Flesh (Telarc, 2002)
- Cosmopolitan Life (Ole, 2005)
- Vocal Rendezvous (SPV, 2006)

With Will Downing

- A Dream Fulfilled (Island, 1991)
- Love's the Place to Be (4th & Broadway 1993)
- Moods (4th & Broadway 1995)
- All the Man You Need (Motown 2000)
- Christmas, Love and You (GRP, 2004)
- Lust, Love & Lies (Peak 2010)
- Silver (2013)

With Roberta Flack

- Feel Like Makin' Love (Atlantic, 1975)
- Blue Lights in the Basement (Atlantic, 1977)
- Roberta Flack (Atlantic, 1978)
- Roberta Flack Featuring Donny Hathaway (Atlantic, 1979)
- Roberta (Atlantic, 1994)

With Carlos Franzetti

- New York Toccata (Verve, 1985)
- Tropic of Capricorn (Square Discs 1993)
- Grafitti (Sonorama, 2007)

With Jun Fukamachi

- Spiral Steps (Kitty, 1976)
- The Sea of Dirac (Kitty, 1977)
- Evening Star (Kitty, 1978)
- Live (Alfa, 1978)
- On the Move (Alfa, 1978)

With Eric Gale

- Ginseng Woman (Columbia, 1977)
- Multiplication (Columbia, 1977)
- Part of You (Columbia, 1979)

With Terumasa Hino

- City Connection (Flying Disk, 1979)
- Daydream (Flying Disk, 1980)
- Double Rainbow (CBS/Sony, 1981)

With Garland Jeffreys

- Ghost Writer (A&M, 1977)
- One-Eyed Jack (A&M, 1978)
- I'm Alive (Universal, 2006)

With Chaka Khan

- Chaka (Warner Bros., 1978)
- Naughty (Warner Bros., 1980)
- What Cha' Gonna Do for Me (Warner Bros., 1981)
- Chaka Khan (Warner Bros., 1982)
- Destiny (Warner Bros., 1986)
- The Woman I Am (Warner Bros., 1992)

With Steve Khan

- Eyewitness (Antilles, 1981)
- Modern Times (Trio, 1982)
- Casa Loco (Antilles, 1984)
- Helping Hand (Polydor, 1987)
- Public Access (GRP, 1990)
- Headline (Polydor, 1992)
- Crossings (PolyGram, 1994)

With Tania Maria

- Made in New York (Manhattan, 1985)
- The Lady from Brazil (Manhattan, 1986)
- Bela Vista (World Pacific, 1990)
- Europe (Pee Wee Music, 1997)

With Harvey Mason

- Earthmover (Arista, 1976)
- Funk in a Mason Jar (Arista, 1977)
- Stone Mason (Alfa, 1982)

With Michel Petrucciani

- Music (Blue Note, 1989)
- Playground (Blue Note, 1991)
- Both Worlds (Dreyfus, 1997)

With Buddy Rich

- Transition (Groove Merchant, 1974)
- Very Live at Buddy's Place (Groove Merchant, 1974)
- The Bull (Chiaroscuro, 1980)
- Tuff Dude (LRC, 1986)
- The All Star Small Groups (LRC, 2001)

With Lee Ritenour

- Captain Fingers (Epic, 1977)
- The Captain's Journey (Elektra, 1978)
- Lee Ritenour & His Gentle Thoughts (JVC, 1977)
- On the Line (Elektra Musician 1983)
- Festival (GRP, 1988)
- Color Rit (GRP, 1989)
- Overtime (Eagle Eye 2004)
- World of Brazil (GRP, 2005)

With Mike Stern

- Odds or Evens (Atlantic, 1991)
- Who Let the Cats Out? (Heads Up, 2006)
- All Over the Place (Heads Up, 2012)

With Hiromi Uehara

- Another Mind (Telarc, 2003)
- Brain (Telarc, 2004)
- Voice (Telarc, 2011)
- Move (Telarc, 2012)
- Alive (Telarc, 2014)
- Spark (Telarc, 2016)

With Grover Washington Jr.

- A Secret Place (Kudu, 1976)
- In Concert (Pioneer, 1982)
- Inside Moves (Elektra, 1984)
With others
- Monty Alexander, Caribbean Circle (Chesky, 1992)
- Peter Allen, Continental American (A&M, 1974)
- Gabriela Anders, Cool Again (Evj! 2015)
- Ashford & Simpson, Stay Free (Warner Bros., 1979)
- Fahir Atakoglu, If (Taxim Edition Turkiye, 2005)
- Fahir Atakoglu, Istanbul in Blue (Far & Here, 2007)
- Anita Baker, Rhythm of Love (Atlantic, 1994)
- Bob Baldwin, Lookin' Back (nuGroove, 2009)
- Gato Barbieri, Passion and Fire (A&M, 1984)
- Gato Barbieri, Que Pasa (Columbia 1997)
- Thereza Bazar, The Big Kiss (MCA, 1985)
- Jim Beard, Song of the Sun (CTI, 1991)
- Bee Gees, Still Waters (Polydor, 1997)
- George Benson, In Your Eyes (Warner Bros., 1983)
- George Benson, 20/20 (Warner Bros., 1985)
- Warren Bernhardt, Manhattan Update (Arista Novus 1980)
- Warren Bernhardt, Hands On (DMP, 1987)
- Randy Bernsen, Paradise Citizens (Zebra, 1988)
- Rory Block, House of Hearts (Zensor, 1988)
- Rory Block, Ain't I a Woman (Zensor, 1992)
- Perry Botkin Jr., Ports (A&M, 1977)
- Ralph Bowen, Movin' On (Criss Cross 1992)
- Till Brönner, Midnight (Button 1996)
- Peabo Bryson, Take No Prisoners (Elektra, 1985)
- Peabo Bryson, Positive (Elektra, 1988)
- Jimmy Buffett, Hot Water (MCA, 1988)
- Dina Carroll, So Close (A&M, 1993)
- Dennis Chambers, Getting Even (Glass House 1992)
- Dennis Chambers, Planet Earth (BHM, 2005)
- Sandeep Chowta, Matters of the Heart (Sony, 2013)
- John Clark, Il Suono (CMP, 1993)
- Norman Connors, Slew Foot (Buddah, 1974)
- Norman Connors, You Are My Starship (Buddah, 1976)
- Chick Corea, The Leprechaun (Polydor, 1976)
- Hank Crawford, Hank Crawford's Back (Kudu, 1976)
- Randy Crawford, Everything Must Change (Warner Bros., 1976)
- Randy Crawford, Abstract Emotions (Warner Bros., 1986)
- Lou Courtney, Buffalo Smoke (RCA Victor, 1976)
- Eddie Daniels, Morning Thunder (Columbia, 1980)
- Michael Davis, Midnight Crossing (Lipstick, 1994)
- Rainy Davis, Sweetheart (Columbia, 1987)
- Eumir Deodato, Very Together (MCA, 1976)
- Devonsquare, Bye Bye Route 66 (Atlantic, 1991)
- Paul Dresher & Ned Rothenberg, Opposites Attract (CounterCurrents 1991)
- Gene Dunlap, Party in Me (Capitol/EMI 1981)
- Eliane Elias, A Long Story (Manhattan, 1991)
- Pee Wee Ellis, Home in the Country (Savoy, 1977)
- Jon Faddis, Good and Plenty (Buddah, 1979)
- Donald Fagen, The Nightfly (Warner Bros., 1982)
- Joe Farrell, La Catedral y el Toro (Warner Bros., 1977)
- Rachelle Ferrell, Rachelle Ferrell (Capitol, 1992)
- Barry Finnerty, Lights On Broadway (Morning, 1985)
- Barry Finnerty, Space Age Blues (Hot Wire, 1998)
- Sonny Fortune, Infinity Is (Atlantic, 1978)
- Hiroshi Fukumura, Hot Shot (Morning, 1985)
- Four Tops, Magic (Motown, 1985)
- Henry Gaffney, Waiting for a Wind (RCA 1976)
- Henry Gaffney, On Again Off Again (Manhattan, 1978)
- Carlos Garnett, Journey to Enlightenment (Muse, 1974)
- Carlos Garnett, Let This Melody Ring On (Muse, 1975)
- Stephane Grappelli, Uptown Dance (Columbia, 1978)
- Urbie Green, The Fox (CTI, 1977)
- Michael Gregory, Situation X (Island, 1983)
- Dave Grusin, One of a Kind (Polydor, 1977)
- Kit Hain, School for Spies (Mercury, 1983)
- Delores Hall, Delores Hall (Capitol/EMI 1979)
- Lionel Hampton, Hamp's Blues (Denon 1986)
- Lionel Hampton, Mostly Blues (Musicmasters 1989)
- Gene Harris, Tone Tantrum (Blue Note, 2001)
- Takehiro Honda, It's Great Outside (Flying Disk, 1978)
- Lena Horne, Lena Horne: the Lady and Her Music (Qwest, 1981)
- Miki Howard, Love Confessions (Atlantic, 1987)
- Bobbi Humphrey, Freestyle (Epic, 1978)
- Phyllis Hyman, Phyllis Hyman (Buddah, 1977)
- Masaru Imada, Tropical Sunset (Trio, 1981)
- Masaru Imada, Blue Marine (Trio, 1982)
- Freddie Jackson, Do Me Again (Capitol, 1990)
- Joe Jackson, Will Power (A&M, 1987)
- Rebbie Jackson, Reaction (CBS, 1986)
- Al Jarreau, L Is for Lover (Warner Bros., 1986)
- Quincy Jones, Sounds...and Stuff Like That!! (A&M, 1978)
- Junior, Acquired Taste (London 1985)
- Ryo Kawasaki, Mirror of My Mind (Satellites, 1997)
- Earl Klugh, Finger Paintings (Blue Note, 1977)
- Earl Klugh, Ballads (Manhattan, 1993)
- Kahoru Kohiruimaki, Distance (TDK, 1990)
- Wayne Krantz, Signals (Enja, 1990)
- Bireli Lagrene, My Favorite Django (Dreyfus, 1995)
- Yusef Lateef, The Doctor Is in ...and Out (Atlantic, 1976)
- Webster Lewis, On the Town (Epic, 1976)
- Dave Liebman, Back On the Corner (Tone Center, 2006)
- Reggie Lucas, Survival Themes (East Wind 1976)
- Ralph MacDonald, Port Pleasure (Videoarts, 1998)
- Teo Macero, Impressions of Virus (Columbia, 1980)
- Madonna, Madonna (Sire, 1983)
- Teena Marie, Robbery (Epic, 1983)
- Sleepy Matsumoto, Papillon (Compose, 1992)
- Maureen McGovern, Baby I'm Yours (BMG, 1992)
- Sergio Mendes, Sergio Mendes and the New Brasil '77 (Elektra, 1977)
- Pat Metheny, Secret Story (Geffen, 1992)
- Bette Midler, Thighs and Whispers (Atlantic, 1979)
- Barry Miles, Sky Train (RCA Victor, 1977)
- Russell Morris, Turn It On (Wizard, 1976)
- Gerry Mulligan, Little Big Horn (GRP, 1983)
- Milton Nascimento, Angelus (Warner Bros., 1993)
- Milton Nascimento, Nascimento (Warner Bros., 1997)
- David "Fathead" Newman, Mr. Fathead (Warner Bros., 1976)
- Maxine Nightingale, Night Life (United Artists, 1977)
- Claude Nougaro, L'amour Sorcier (Mercury/Universal, 2014)
- The O'Jays, Ship Ahoy (Philadelphia International, 1973)
- Jeffrey Osborne, Only Human (Arista, 1990)
- Billy Paul, 360 Degrees of Billy Paul (Philadelphia International, 1972)
- Billy Paul, War of the Gods (Philadelphia International, 1973)
- Phil Perry, Pure Pleasure (MCA GRP, 1994)
- Peter, Paul & Mary, No Easy Walk to Freedom (Mercury, 1986)
- Esther Phillips, Capricorn Princess (Kudu, 1976)
- Simon Phillips, Another Lifetime (Lipstick, 1997)
- Noel Pointer, Hold On (United Artists, 1978)
- Jesse Rae, The Thistle (Luzuli Music 2014)
- Ernest Ranglin, Gotcha! (Telarc, 2001)
- Lou Rawls, Shades of Blue (Philadelphia International, 1980)
- Jess Roden, The Player Not the Game (Island, 1977)
- Diana Ross, The Boss (Motown, 1979)
- Ray Russell, Goodbye Svengali (Cuneiform, 2006)
- Salt & Sugar, -Concerts- (Fun House, 1996)
- Sam & Dave, Soul Study Volume 1 (51 West 1982)
- David Sanborn, A Change of Heart (Warner Bros., 1987)
- David Sanborn, Heart to Heart (Warner Bros., 1990)
- Arturo Sandoval, Flight to Freedom (GRP, 1991)
- Alejandro Sanz, No Es Lo Mismo (WEA, 2006)
- Lalo Schifrin, Black Widow (CTI, 1976)
- Lalo Schifrin, Towering Toccata (CTI, 1977)
- Helen Schneider, Let It Be Now (Windsong, 1978)
- John Scofield, Who's Who? (Arista Novus 1979)
- John Sebastian, Tar Beach (Shanachie, 1992)
- Doc Severinsen, Brand New Thing (Epic, 1977)
- Carly Simon, Torch (Warner Bros., 1981)
- Edward Simon, Beauty Within (AudioQuest, 1994)
- Paul Simon, One-Trick Pony (Warner Bros., 1980)
- Paul Simon, Hearts and Bones (Warner Bros., 1983)
- Simon & Garfunkel, The Concert in Central Park (Warner Bros., 1982)
- Kathy Sledge, Heart (Epic, 1992)
- Lonnie Liston Smith, Silhouettes (Doctor Jazz, 1984)
- Steve Smith, Steve Smith and Buddy's Buddies Featuring Buddy Rich Alumni (Tone Center, 1999)
- Phoebe Snow, Something Real (Elektra, 1989)
- Bert Sommer, Bert Sommer (Capitol, 1977)
- David Spinozza, Spinozza (A&M, 1978)
- David Spinozza, Superstar (A&M, 1978)
- Steely Dan, Gaucho (MCA, 1980)
- Jeremy Steig, Temple of Birth (Columbia, 1975)
- Charles Sullivan, Genesis (Strata-East, 1974)
- Ximo Tebar, Eclipse (Sunnyside, 2006)
- Nino Tempo, Tenor Saxophone (Atlantic, 1990)
- John Tropea, NY Cats Direct (DMP, 1986)
- John Tropea, Tropea 10: The Time Is Right (Videoarts, 2007)
- Michal Urbaniak, Fusion III (CBS, 1975)
- Michal Urbaniak, Ecstasy (Marlin, 1978)
- Dave Valentin, Legends (Arista GRP, 1978)
- Luther Vandross, Never Too Much (Epic, 1981)
- Harold Vick, After the Dance (Wolf, 1977)
- Roch Voisine, Coup de tête (Les Disques Star, 1994)
- Martha Wash, Martha Wash (RCA 1992)
- Kazumi Watanabe, Mermaid Boulevard (Alfa, 1978)
- Sadao Watanabe, Autumn Blow (Flying Disk, 1977)
- Sadao Watanabe, How's Everything (Columbia, 1980)
- Frank Weber, As the Time Flies (RCA Victor, 1978)
- Dave Weckl, Master Plan (GRP, 1990)
- Dave Weckl, Hard-Wired (GRP, 1994)
- James D-Train Williams, Miracles of the Heart (Sony, 2011)
- Vanessa Williams, The Sweetest Days (Mercury, 1994)
- Nancy Wilson, Nancy Now! (Columbia, 1988)
- Bernie Worrell/Jesse Rae, Worae (Luzuli Music 2017)
- Akiko Yano, Welcome Back (Midi, 1989)
- Akiko Yano, Love Life (Nonesuch, 1993)
