= Beyond Standard =

Studio album by Hiromi's Sonicbloom
- Released: June 10, 2008
- Recorded: January 9–12, 2008
- Studio: The Great Hall at Allaire Studios, Shokan, New York.
- Genre: Jazz, post-bop, jazz fusion
- Length: 59:41
- Label: Telarc Jazz
- Producer: Hiromi Uehara, Michael Bishop

Hiromi Uehara chronology
Duet (2008)	Beyond Standard (2008)	Place to Be (2009)

Professional ratings
Review scores
Source	Rating
All About Jazz	4.5/5 stars
Allmusic	4/5 stars

Beyond Standard is an album by Hiromi Uehara’s group, Hiromi’s Sonicbloom. Contrasted with her previous albums that featured mostly original compositions, this one is a collection of Jazz standards played in a fusion style.

== Reception ==
Chris Jones of BBC stated "With her usual trio now bumped up by the presence of guitarist David Fiuczynski (in their 'Sonicbloom' format), Hiromi Uehara continues the work of her previous album, Time Control, but this time it's cover versions all the way. The precocious pianist is undeniably, stunningly talented and though her brand of flash ivory tickling is jaw-dropping to behold it's often a little hard to process in digital form."

Jeff Winbush of All About Jazz noted "This is not just a good album; it's a fun album. The absolute nuttiness, yet undeniable proficiency and technique on display on tracks like "I've Got Rhythm" and "Claire De Lune" serve as cheerful additions to Uehara's efforts on Beyond Standard. At some point in her career, Hiromi Uehara may mail it in and make a half-hearted or lousy record. But so far she's five-for-five in producing music that is unfailingly brilliant, innovative, radiant and clever. Hiromi's Sonicbloom is a shot of adrenalin for tired musical tastes." Hal Horowitz of AllMusic added "It's a classy, impressive set that displays Hiromi's obvious talents on keyboards, but also her commendable ability to integrate solos into the band format without losing the thread of the original song's structure. Co-billing her talented Sonicbloom musicians is well earned, since they are nearly as much a part of this album's success as its star".

== Track listing ==
1. Intro: Softly, as in a Morning Sunrise (Hiromi Uehara) (0:28)
2. Softly, as in a Morning Sunrise (Sigmund Romberg) (7:29)
3. Clair de Lune (Claude Debussy) (7:25)
4. Caravan (Duke Ellington / Juan Tizol) (8:49)
5. Ue Wo Muite Aruko (Hachidai Nakamura) (8:42)
6. My Favorite Things (Richard Rodgers) (7:48)
7. Led Boots (Max Middleton) (6:33)
8. XYG (H. Uehara) (6:32)
9. I've Got Rhythm (George Gershwin) (5:51)
10. Return Of Kung Fu World Champion (Hiromi Uehara) (10:18) (Japanese Edition Bonus Track)

== Personnel ==
- Hiromi Uehara - Piano
- David Fiuczynski - Guitar
- Tony Grey - Bass
- Martin Valihora - Drums
