= Brain (album) =

Studio album by Hiromi
- Released: 25 May 2004
- Recorded: December 9–11, 2003
- Studios: The Sound Kitchen, "Big Boy", Franklin, Tennessee
- Genres: Postmodern music; jazz, Post-bop
- Length: 61:44
- Label: Telarc Distribution
- Producers: Michael Bishop, Hiromi Uehara

Hiromi chronology
Another Mind (2003)	Brain (2004)	Spiral (2006)

Brain is an album from Hiromi Uehara's first trio featuring bassist Tony Grey and drummer Martin Valihora.

== Reception ==
Professional ratings
Review scores
Source	Rating
AllMusic	4/5 stars
Tom Hull	B+
The Penguin Guide to Jazz Recordings	2/4 stars

C. Michael Bailey of All About Jazz wrote "All of the pieces are pregnant with ideas, very well thought out ideas. In spite of my prejudice against electric elements in jazz, it is impossible for me to state anything other than that Brain is very likely to be a highlight recording of 2004."

Andrew Lindemann Malone of JazzTimes commented "Hiromi doesn’t play jazz. Oh, sure, she plays piano in a jazz trio, which is why you are reading about her new album Brain in JazzTimes. But Hiromi also digs classical, funk, rock and a few other styles, and she can play in all of them. What’s more, she doesn’t draw lines between those musics when she composes."

Reviewing for The Village Voice in September 2004, Tom Hull said of the album, "Eclectic postmodern piano trio, more or less, with a penchant for gadgets and kung fu."

== Track listing ==
All compositions by Hiromi Uehara.

1. Kung-Fu World Champion (6:53)
2. If... (7:11)
3. Wind Song (5:43)
4. Brain (9:05)
5. Desert on the Moon (7:08)
6. Green Tea Farm (4:38)
7. Keytalk (10:02)
8. Legend of the Purple Valley (10:47)
9. Another Mind (Live, Japanese edition bonus track) (13:10)

== Personnel ==
- Hiromi Uehara - Piano
- Tony Grey - Bass (1, 3, 4, 7)
- Anthony Jackson - Bass (2, 5, 8)
- Martin Valihora - Drums
