= Spiral (Hiromi album) =

Studio album by Hiromi
- Released: January 16, 2006
- Recorded: May 28–31, 2005
- Studio: Blackbird (Berry Hill, Tennessee)
- Genres: Jazz, post-bop, third stream
- Length: 65:38 / 73:09 (incl. bonus track)
- Label: Telarc
- Producers: Hiromi Uehara, Michael Bishop

Hiromi chronology
Brain (2004)	Spiral (2006)	Time Control (2007)

Professional ratings
Review scores
Source	Rating
All About Jazz	4/5 stars
Allmusic	4/5 stars
PopMatters	8/10
The Penguin Guide to Jazz Recordings	2.5/4 stars

Spiral is a studio album by jazz pianist Hiromi Uehara with bassist Tony Grey and drummer Martin Valihora. NPR called the album "part classical, part jazz and part simply unclassifiable".

== Reception ==
Matt Cibula of PopMatters wrote, "Spiral is her third album... This record will be on many people's year-end lists, even if they are not jazz people. Dig it." Paula Edelstein of AllMusic commented, "With the release of Spiral, the award-winning pianist/composer Hiromi Uehara stands at the threshold of limitless possibility." Jim Santella of All About Jazz commented "Her piano cascades drive with simple elegance, and she resolves every phrase with a dynamic spirit. She enthralls her audience with powerful rhythmic strides that challenge the intellect. Meters change, moods shift, and her driving force keeps on going. Her improvised romps come alive with foot-tapping and head-bobbing energy that keeps the listener buoyed from start to finish."

== Track listing ==
All compositions by Hiromi Uehara.

1. Spiral (10:40)
2. Music for Three-Piece Orchestra: Open Door - Tuning - Prologue (10:16)
3. Music for Three-Piece Orchestra: Déjà vu (7:45)
4. Music for Three-Piece Orchestra: Reverse (5:09)
5. Music for Three-Piece Orchestra: Edge (5:19)
6. Old Castle, by the River, in the Middle of the Forest (8:20)
7. Love and Laughter (9:20)
8. Return of Kung-Fu World Champion (Bonus track) (9:39)
9. Big Chill (Japanese edition bonus track) (7:30)

== Personnel ==
- Hiromi Uehara – piano
- Tony Grey – bass
- Martin Valihora – drums
