= Hiromi Live in Concert =

Live album by Hiromi Uehara

Live in Concert

Live album by Hiromi Uehara
- Released: June 2009
- Recorded: December 2, 2005
- Venue: Shinagawa Stellar Ball (Tokyo)
- Genre: Jazz
- Length: 94:25
- Label: Telarc

Hiromi Live in Concert is a DVD of a concert recorded at the Shinagawa Stellar Ball in Tokyo in December 2005. It features the pianist Hiromi Uehara accompanied by bassist Tony Grey and drummer Martin Valihora.

== Track listing ==
No.	Title	Length
1.	"Spiral"	14:15
2.	"If..."	10:20
3.	"Old Castle, by the river, in the middle of a forest"	8:25
4.	"Music for Three - Piece - Orchestra: Open Door - Tuning - Prologue"	10:16
5.	"Music for Three - Piece - Orchestra: DeJa Vu"	7:46
6.	"Music for Three - Piece - Orchestra: Reverse"	5:09
7.	"Music for Three - Piece - Orchestra: Edge"	5:20
8.	"Love and Laughter"	11:00
9.	"Dancando No Paraiso"	7:40

== Reception ==
According to Alex Henderson of Allmusic, "Hiromi has a variety of moods during the concert. Sometimes, she is reflective and impressionistic; other times, she is playful -- and there are also moments of passionate, emotional exuberance." Alongside bassist Tony Grey and drummer Martin Valihora, the trio works cohesively together.
