= Blackbird (Beatles song) =

1968 song by The Beatles

- Cover of the Northern Songs sheet music

Song by the Beatles

from the album The Beatles
- Released: 22 November 1968
- Recorded: 11 June 1968
- Studio: EMI, London
- Genre: Folk
- Length: 2:19
- Label: Apple
- Songwriter: Lennon–McCartney
- Producer: George Martin

Audio sample
- file; help

"Blackbird" is a song by the English rock band the Beatles from their 1968 double album The Beatles (also known as "the White Album"). It was written by Paul McCartney and credited to Lennon–McCartney, and performed as a solo piece by McCartney. When discussing the song, McCartney has said that the lyrics were inspired by hearing the call of a blackbird in Rishikesh, India, and by the civil rights movement in the Southern United States.

Widely regarded as one of the best songs by the band, it has been covered by several artists, including Agua De Annique, Beyoncé, Judy Collins, Crosby, Stills & Nash, Neil Diamond, Billy Preston, Sia, Sarah McLachlan, Hiromi Uehara, Foo Fighters, José Gonzáles, and Anne Sofie von Otter.

== Origins ==
Lute Suite No. 1 – BWV 996, E Minor – V Bourrée
Performed on a lautenwerck by Martha Goldstein

McCartney explained on Chaos and Creation at Abbey Road that the guitar accompaniment for "Blackbird" was inspired by Johann Sebastian Bach's Bourrée in E minor, a well-known lute piece, often played on the classical guitar. As teenagers, he and George Harrison tried to learn Bourrée as a "show off" piece. The Bourrée is distinguished by melody and bass notes played simultaneously on the upper and lower strings. McCartney said that he adapted a segment of the Bourrée (reharmonised into the original's relative major key of G) as the opening of "Blackbird", and carried the musical idea throughout the song. The first three notes of the song, which then transitioned into the opening guitar riff, were inspired from Bach.

The first night his future wife Linda Eastman stayed at his home, McCartney played "Blackbird" for the fans camped outside his house.

== Meaning and interpretation ==
Since composing "Blackbird" in 1968, McCartney has given various statements regarding both his inspiration for the song and its meaning. He has said that he was inspired by hearing the call of a blackbird one morning when the Beatles were studying Transcendental Meditation in Rishikesh, India, and also writing it in Scotland as a response to the Little Rock Nine incident and the overall civil rights movement, wanting to write a song dedicated to people who had been affected by discrimination.

In May 2002, following a show in Dallas, Texas, McCartney discussed the song with KCRW DJ Chris Douridas, saying:

I had been doing some [poetry readings] in the last year or so because I've got a poetry book out called Blackbird Singing, and when I would read "Blackbird", I would always try and think of some explanation to tell the people. ... So, I was doing explanations, and I actually just remembered why I'd written "Blackbird", you know, that I'd been, I was in Scotland playing on my guitar, and I remembered this whole idea of "you were only waiting for this moment to arise" was about, you know, the black people's struggle in the southern states, and I was using the symbolism of a blackbird. It's not really about a blackbird whose wings are broken, you know, it's a bit more symbolic.

In 2018, McCartney further elaborated on the song's meaning, explaining that "blackbird" should be interpreted as "black girl", in the context of the civil rights troubles in southern 1960s US.

His stepmother, Angie McCartney, has claimed that McCartney wrote it for her elderly mother, Edith Stopforth, who was staying at Jim McCartney's house while recovering from a long illness. Angie recalled that McCartney visited the house and sat at Edith's bedside, where Edith told him that she would listen to a bird singing at night.

Although McCartney has been consistent in the meaning, there are still varied interpretations – as a nature song, a message in support of the Black power movement, or a love song. Writing in the 1990s, Ian MacDonald noted the theory that "Blackbird" was intended as "a metaphor for the black civil rights struggle", but pointed to the composition's romantic qualities, arguing that the early-morning bird song "translates ... into a succinct metaphor for awakening on a deeper level". However, during an informal rehearsal at EMI Studios on 22 November 1968, before he and Donovan took part in a Mary Hopkin recording session, McCartney played "Blackbird", telling Donovan that he wrote it after having "read something in the paper about the riots" and that he meant the black "bird" to symbolise a Black woman.

Along with McCartney's "Helter Skelter", "Blackbird" was one of several White Album songs that Charles Manson interpreted as the Beatles' prophecy of an apocalyptic race war that would lead to him and his "Family" of followers ruling the US on countercultural principles. Manson interpreted the lyrics as a call to black Americans to wage war on their white counterparts, and instructed his followers to commit a series of murders in Los Angeles in August 1969 to trigger such a conflict.

== Composition and recording ==
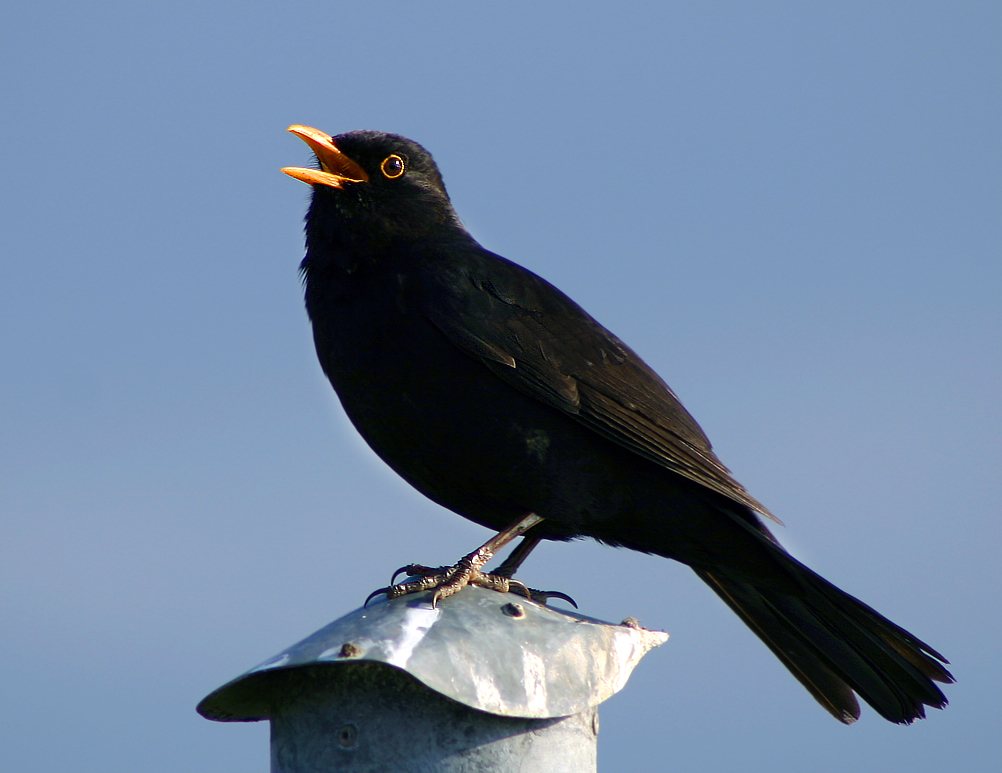
"Blackbird" includes the sound of a male common blackbird singing.

The song was recorded on 11 June 1968 at EMI's Abbey Road Studios' Studio 2, in London, with George Martin as the producer and Geoff Emerick as the audio engineer. It is a solo performance with McCartney playing a Martin D-28 acoustic guitar. The track includes recordings of a male common blackbird singing in the background.

Apart from the blackbird, only three sounds were recorded: McCartney's voice, his guitar, and a tapping that keeps time on the left channel. This tapping "has been incorrectly identified as a metronome in the past", according to engineer Geoff Emerick, who said it is actually the sound of Paul tapping his foot. McCartney also said the same in The Beatles Anthology documentary (1995). Emerick recalls Paul's foot-taps being mic'd up separately. Footage included in the bonus content on disc two of the 2009 remaster of the album shows McCartney tapping both his feet alternately while performing the song.

The mono version contains the bird sounds a few seconds earlier than the stereo recording, and was originally issued on a mono incarnation of The Beatles (it has since been issued worldwide as part of The Beatles in Mono CD box set). The song appears on the 2006 remix album Love with "Yesterday", billed as "Blackbird/Yesterday". "Blackbird" provides an introduction to "Yesterday".

== Live performances ==
In 1973, McCartney included the song, along with the Beatles track "Michelle", as part of his acoustic medley in the television special James Paul McCartney. Starting with his 1975–76 world tour with the band Wings, McCartney has performed "Blackbird" on every one of his concert tours. A solo performance of the song, followed by "Yesterday", appears on Wings' 1976 live album Wings over America.

McCartney also included "Blackbird" in his set at the Party at the Palace concert in June 2002. In 2009, McCartney performed the song at the Coachella Valley Music and Arts Festival, commenting prior to singing it on how it had been written in response to the Civil Rights Movement, and added, "It's so great to realise so many civil rights issues have been overcome."

A live version appears in the multi-CD collection Good Evening New York City, which was released in 2009 and recorded inside the American stadium Citi Field.

== Legacy ==
The song is regarded as one of the best in the Beatles' discography, and is generally considered one of McCartney's finest musical achievements. Coinciding with the 50th anniversary of its release, Jacob Stolworthy of The Independent listed "Blackbird" at number five in his ranking of the White Album's 30 tracks. He said that its "beautiful calmness" was at odds with the growing racial tensions that allegedly inspired the song, and concluded: "For many, it's the apotheosis of McCartney's career and remains a standout in his solo live shows." Although the 1985 Mr. Mister song "Broken Wings" contains an identical lyric, "Take these broken wings and learn to fly", Mr. Mister member Richard Page has described this as "a mindless unintentional reference" attributable to songwriter John Lang being inspired by Kahlil Gibran's 1912 book Broken Wings.

== Personnel ==
According to Ian MacDonald:

- Paul McCartney – lead and backing vocals, acoustic guitar, tape loops, foot tapping

== Charts ==
2010 chart performance for "Blackbird"
Chart (2010)	Peak position
Netherlands (Single Top 100)	91
US Billboard Hot 100 Recurrents	20

2025 chart performance for "Blackbird"
Chart (2025)	Peak position
UK Streaming (OCC)	31

== Certifications and sales ==
Region	Certification	Certified units/sales
Denmark (IFPI Danmark)	Gold	45,000^{‡}
Spain (Promusicae)	Gold	30,000^{‡}
New Zealand (RMNZ)	2× Platinum	60,000^{‡}
United Kingdom (BPI)	Platinum	600,000^{‡}
United States digital sales	—	506,630
^{‡} Sales+streaming figures based on certification alone.

== Cover versions ==
Crosby, Stills & Nash recorded a version in February of 1969 during sessions for their debut album; it was later released on their box set of 1991. Concert versions by the trio can also be found on the document of their 1974 tour as well as the 2019 expanded set of performances from the Woodstock Festival.

In 2008, Scottish folk musician Julie Fowlis sang "Blackbird" in Scottish Gaelic on a recording commissioned by Mojo magazine to celebrate The White Album's 40th anniversary. The song has subsequently been part of her live repertoire.

In 2010, Chris Colfer covered the song in the musical series Glee, which was included in the soundtrack album Glee: The Music Presents the Warblers. The version peaked at number 37 on the Billboard Hot 100, becoming the song's highest placement on the chart until Beyoncé's 2024 cover.

In 2015, Dave Grohl performed "Blackbird" during the 88th Academy Awards' "In Memoriam" segment. In 2019, Hiromi Uehara did an improvized jazz piano version of the song on her album Spectrum.

=== Beyoncé version ===
"Blackbiird"

Song by Beyoncé, Brittney Spencer, Reyna Roberts, Tanner Adell, Tiera Kennedy

from the album Cowboy Carter
- Released: 29 March 2024
- Studio: East Iris (Nashville, Tennessee); Westlake (Hollywood, California)
- Genre: Country pop; R&B
- Length: 2:11
- Label: Parkwood; Columbia
- Songwriter: Lennon–McCartney
- Producers: Beyoncé; Paul McCartney; Khirye Tyler; Kuk Harrell

Lyric video
- "Blackbiird" on YouTube

American singer Beyoncé recorded a cover of "Blackbird", for her eighth studio album Cowboy Carter, titled "Blackbiird", featuring country singers Brittney Spencer, Reyna Roberts, Tanner Adell and Tiera Kennedy. The cover received favorable reviews, both for the production and for the significance the new version takes on within Beyoncé's body of work. It also became the version with the highest placement on the Billboard Hot 100, peaking at 27.

==== Production ====
The version uses the original Beatles instrumental. McCartney expressed admiration for Beyoncé's cover, stating: "I think she does a magnificent version of it and it reinforces the civil rights message that inspired me to write the song in the first place. I think Beyoncé has done a fab version and would urge anyone who has not heard it yet to check it out. You are going to love it!"

==== Critical reception ====
Along with a cover of Dolly Parton's "Jolene", "Blackbird" was critically acclaimed by music critics. The cover was appreciated both for its production and its placement as the second track after "American Requiiem", as it emphasizes the sense and narrative of Cowboy Carter's rediscovery of the African American country genre. Clare Thorp of BBC News pointed out that the decision to sing the song with four emerging African American female artists was "intentional" and makes the verse "You were only waiting for this moment to arise" a "significant moment" for the whole purpose of the album. Dave Simpson of The Guardian wrote that Beyoncé's version of the song "has a deep resonance: a spiritual interpretation" with "musicians who have struggled to gain a foothold in the notoriously gate-kept Nashville" and "appreciating the decision to reintroduce the song to the younger generation".

At the 2024 People's Choice Country Awards the cover was nominated for The Cover Song of the Year.

==== Live performance ====
On 25 December 2024, Beyoncé, Brittney Spencer, Reyna Roberts, Tanner Adell and Tiera Kennedy debuted "Blackbiird" live as part of the former's 2024 NFL Halftime Show set list. The song was included on the Cowboy Carter Tour setlist.

==== Charts ====
Weekly charts

Weekly chart performance for "Blackbiird" by Beyoncé
Chart (2024)	Peak position
Canada Hot 100 (Billboard)	47
France (SNEP)	114
Global 200 (Billboard)	23
Portugal (AFP)	79
Sweden (Sverigetopplistan)	90
UK Singles Sales (OCC)	17
UK Streaming (OCC)	31
US Billboard Hot 100	27
US Hot Country Songs (Billboard)	6

==== Certifications ====
Region	Certification	Certified units/sales
Brazil (Pro-Música Brasil)	Gold	20,000^{‡}
^{‡} Sales+streaming figures based on certification alone.

== See also ==
- Civil rights movement in popular culture

== Sources ==
- Badman, Keith (2001). The Beatles Diary Volume 2: After the Break-Up 1970–2001. London: Omnibus Press. ISBN 978-0-7119-8307-6.
- Everett, Walter (1999). The Beatles as Musicians: Revolver through the Anthology. New York, London: Oxford University Press. ISBN 978-0-19-512941-0.
- Lewisohn, Mark (1988). The Beatles Recording Sessions. New York: Harmony Books. ISBN 0-517-57066-1.
- MacDonald, Ian (1998). Revolution in the Head: The Beatles' Records and the Sixties. London: Pimlico. ISBN 978-0-7126-6697-8.
- Madinger, Chip; Easter, Mark (2000). Eight Arms to Hold You: The Solo Beatles Compendium. Chesterfield, MO: 44.1 Productions. ISBN 0-615-11724-4.
- Miles, Barry (1997). Paul McCartney: Many Years from Now. New York, NY: Henry Holt & Company. ISBN 0-8050-5249-6.
- Miles, Barry (2001). The Beatles Diary Volume 1: The Beatles Years. London: Omnibus Press. ISBN 0-7119-8308-9.
- Sounes, Howard (2010). Fab: An Intimate Life of Paul McCartney. London: HarperCollins. ISBN 978-0-00-723705-0.
- Turner, Steve (1999). A Hard Day's Write: The Stories Behind Every Beatles Song (2nd ed.). New York, NY: Carlton/HarperCollins. ISBN 0-06-273698-1.
- Womack, Kenneth (2014). The Beatles Encyclopedia: Everything Fab Four. Santa Barbara, CA: ABC-CLIO. ISBN 978-0-313-39171-2.
