= Spectrum (Hiromi album) =

Studio album by Hiromi
- Released: 18 September 2019
- Recorded: February 20–22, 2019
- Studios: Skywalker Sound (Lucas Valley, California)
- Genre: Jazz
- Length: 73:16
- Label: Telarc
- Producers: Hiromi Uehara, Michael Bishop

Hiromi chronology
Spark (2016)	Spectrum (2019)	Silver Lining Suite (2021)

Professional ratings
Review scores
Source	Rating
AllMusic	4/5 stars
All About Jazz	4/5 stars
Jazzwise	3/5 stars

Spectrum is the eleventh studio album by pianist Hiromi Uehara. The album was released by Telarc in Japan on 18 September 2019, with an international release on 9 October 2019. It was her first solo album in 10 years, after Place to Be.

== Background ==
Uehara explains that "The concept of this album is 'color' and the idea of the title track 'Spectrum' is the following: various colors connect and expand, just like the musical notes." She also mentioned that it was her first piano teacher who taught her to understand the instrument via colors. The title track "Spectrum" was released on YouTube in July 2019. Uehara announced a tour of Europe, USA and Japan to promote the album during October to December 2019. Says Uehara "Making a solo piano album, the biggest difference is that it’s only piano and it’s only me. So, I have to be a drummer, I have to be a bass player, I have to be like a multi-instrumentalist, only using the piano.”

== Reception ==
Jon Regen of Keyboard Magazine said "Ten years after the release of her solo piano debut, Place to Be in 2009, Hiromi goes it alone once again on Spectrum. The album celebrates the maturity and depth that have enriched her music in recent years, during her collaborations with artists like Chick Corea, Stanley Clarke and Michel Camilo." Thom Jurek of AllMusic commented "This 75-minute recital portrays the nearly spiritual command Hiromi has of her instrument and its various languages to extend her astonishing technical facility. More than this, however, it underscores the visionary, authoritative place her pianism commands in modern jazz". Jim Worsley of All About Jazz stated "Remarkable in its scope and vivid in its illustration, Spectrum once again personifies the brilliantly gifted pianist's extraordinary skill set. Feeling and caressing every note empowers her to soar above the clouds and delicately shower her beauty upon us like heavenly drops of rain." Writing for DownBeat, Phillip Lutz commented, "Few pianists exploit the potential of their instruments with the range of skill and emotion that Hiromi has at her disposal. Even at her most effulgent, she is the most intimate of pianists—an effortlessly charismatic communicator who, through her music, evangelizes for the instrument. And, in making that case, few documents testify more powerfully than Spectrum."

JazzTimes included the album in its list "The Year in Review: Top 50 Albums of 2019".

== Track listing ==
All tracks are written by Hiromi Uehara, except for track 5 by John Lennon and Paul McCartney and track 8 by George Gershwin (including interpolations written by Hiromi Uehara, John Coltrane ("Blue Train") and Pete Townshend ("Behind Blue Eyes")).

No.	Title	Length
1.	"Kaleidoscope"	8:06
2.	"Whiteout"	7:33
3.	"Yellow Wurlitzer Blues"	5:40
4.	"Spectrum"	5:04
5.	"Blackbird"	5:21
6.	"Mr. C.C."	6:07
7.	"Once in a Blue Moon"	5:59
8.	"Rhapsody in Various Shades of Blue"	22:45
9.	"Sepia Effect"	6:41
Total length:		1:13:16

== Personnel ==
- Hiromi Uehara – piano

== Charts ==
Chart (2019)	Peak position
Japanese Albums (Oricon)	8
