= Alive (Hiromi album) =

Studio album by Hiromi
- Released: June 17, 2014
- Recorded: February 5–7, 2014
- Studio: Avatar (New York, New York)
- Genre: Jazz, post-bop
- Length: 74:46
- Label: Telarc Digital
- Producer: Hiromi Uehara, Michael Bishop

Hiromi chronology
Move (2012)	Alive (2014)	Spark (2016)

Professional ratings
Review scores
Source	Rating
All About Jazz	5/5 stars
Allmusic	4/5 stars
The Guardian	3/5 stars
Jazzwise	3/5 stars

Alive is the third studio album from Hiromi Uehara's Trio Project featuring bassist Anthony Jackson and drummer Simon Phillips. The album was released by Telarc on June 17, 2014.

== Reception ==
Bill Meredith of JazzTimes stated "If there’s a drawback to all-star groups, it’s that they have little to prove... Alive, recorded live in the studio, boils in comparison to the Trio Project’s standard studio predecessors Voice (2011) and Move (2013)." Jeff Winbush of All About Jazz commented "Matching her inclination for improvisation, drummer Simon Phillips and bassist Anthony Jackson hold down the rhythm responsibilities, freeing up Hiromi to do things with a piano most human beings can't begin to imagine doing. Alive might be the finishing stroke in a trilogy of adventurous albums for the band. Nothing has been said by Hiromi to indicate the group has run its course, but there is a sense of finality and completion to this musical affair. Always a restless musician, it remains an open question as to how long Hiromi will continue this collaboration."

John Fordham of The Guardian noted: "This is her ninth album, and the mix is much the same, but so is the infectious enthusiasm with which she stirs it. The title track is a typical blend of anthemic, big-chord drama soon displaced by catchy left-hand hook over a rugged funk pulse from rock drummer Simon Phillips, then a whirling folk-dance and some jazz-ballad lyricism before returning to its starting point." Chris Jisi of Bass Player wrote "The true magic, however, comes via the interplay during Hiromi’s solo, as Jackson and Phillips spontaneously support, suggest, and react. The art of the piano trio is alive and well."

== Track listing ==
All compositions by Hiromi Uehara.

1. Alive (9:04)
2. Wanderer (8:57)
3. Dreamer (8:31)
4. Seeker (7:25)
5. Player (9:12)
6. Warrior (8:54)
7. Firefly (7:28)
8. Spirit (8:13)
9. Life Goes On (6:49)

== Personnel ==
- Hiromi Uehara – piano
- Anthony Jackson – contrabass guitar
- Simon Phillips – drums
