= Spark (Hiromi album) =

Studio album by Hiromi
- Released: February 12, 2016
- Recorded: October 9–12, 2015
- Studio: Power Station New England, Waterford, Connecticut.
- Genre: Jazz, post-bop
- Length: 72:11
- Label: Telarc
- Producer: Hiromi Uehara, Michael Bishop

Hiromi chronology
| Alive (2014) | Spark (2016) | Spectrum (2019) |

Professional ratings
Review scores
| Source | Rating |
|---|---|
| All About Jazz | 5/5 stars |
| AllMusic | 4.5/5 stars |
| Financial Times | 3/5 stars |
| Jazzwise | 4/5 stars |

Spark is the fourth and final studio album from Hiromi Uehara's Trio Project featuring bassist Anthony Jackson and drummer Simon Phillips. The album was released on February 12, 2016 by Telarc.

The album reached the No. 1 position on Billboard Jazz Albums chart for the week of April 23, 2016.

== Background ==
In her interview for Saskatoon StarPhoenix Uehara commented, "I wanted to make the album like novel or play. Something like a imaginary soundtrack to a imaginary film. Everything starts with a single spark, and you are moved by the spark, I wanted to write about the story which starts from these sparks. I always want to grow as a musician, there are so much to learn and I am hungry to learn."

== Reception ==
Jeff Winbush of All About Jazz stated, "Hiromi continues to be one of the most inventive and awe-inspiring pianists in jazz today. Phillips' drumming is alternatingly both dynamic and precise. Jackson is the silent partner of the band, but is the glue which holds it together so it doesn't fly apart into undisciplined soloing... Hers is the piano in the Spark." Thom Jurek of AllMusic wrote "Spark integrates each element in this band's arsenal to create a whole that is provocative and seamless. Hiromi's band challenges modern music norms with authority. Their spirit of restless creativity is expressed with as much warmth and humor as technical acumen. The tunes here, though rigorous musical workouts, all reach the level of song -- not an accomplishment most piano trios can claim." S. Victor Aaron of Something Else! commented, "Hiromi has settled into a pattern with Anthony Jackson and Simon Phillips with another one-word album (following Voice, Move and Alive) but in her case ‘settling’ doesn’t equate to ‘mediocre’. The one word that comes to mind when taking in Spark is ‘stimulating.’" In his review for Financial Times Mike Hobart wrote, "As with her gigs, Hiromi’s muscular fluency conjoins styles with abandon in a series of flamboyant set pieces... Not much subtlety, but lots to excite."

== Track listing ==
All compositions by Hiromi Uehara.

1. "Spark" (9:04)
2. "In a Trance" (8:55)
3. "Take Me Away" (7:26)
4. "Wonderland" (5:43)
5. "Indulgence (8:15)
6. "Dilemma" (8:51)
7. "What Will Be, Will Be" (7:43)
8. "Wake Up and Dream" (8:51)
9. "All's Well" (7:32)

== Personnel ==
- Hiromi Uehara – piano, keys
- Anthony Jackson – contrabass guitar
- Simon Phillips – drums
