= Another Mind =

Studio album by Hiromi
- Released: 22 April 2003
- Recorded: 16–18 September 2002
- Studios: Avatar, New York City
- Genres: Jazz, post-bop
- Length: 70:25
- Label: Telarc Jazz
- Producers: Richard Evans, Ahmad Jamal

Hiromi chronology
Another Mind (2003)	Brain (2004)

Professional ratings
Review scores
Source	Rating
Allmusic	3/5 stars
The Penguin Guide to Jazz Recordings	1.5/4 stars

Another Mind is the debut release from Hiromi Uehara, a jazz and jazz fusion pianist. It was released in 2003 and received the award for foreign jazz album of the year in the 2004 Japan Annual Gold Disc Awards.

== Reception ==
Peter Marsh of BBC stated "Surrounding herself with a cast of young, gifted musicians (and a slightly older one in the shape of the great bassist Anthony Jackson), 24 year old Hiromi Uehara's music is audacious, hyperactive stuff. Sticking mainly to acoustic piano, her approach is reminiscent of Oscar Peterson on steroids. Few of the instrument's 88 keys remain untouched for long." Robert L. Calder of PopMatters stated "The name that comes to mind is tsunami, or some other earthquake and volcano jargon term. Quite simply, I've heard no more powerful jazz pianist than Hiromi Uehara. Current competition includes the Russian Simon Nabatov (the Slavonic Jaki Byard) as well as Brad Mehldau (I've not heard of Bobby Enriquez in some time, but her fingers punch as hard as his fists and elbows)." Phil Dipietro of All About Jazz wrote "Yes, Hiromi's music is full of emotion, drawing freely and effortlessly from the panorama of influences, most of them adventurous in aspect and application. But please, let's not downplay Ms. Uehara's abilities as a pure technician!"

== Track listing ==
All compositions by Hiromi Uehara.

1. XYZ (5:37)
2. Double Personality (11:57)
3. Summer Rain (6:07)
4. Joy (8:29)
5. 010101 (Binary System) (8:23)
6. Truth and Lies (7:20)
7. Dançando no Paraiso (7:39)
8. Another Mind (8:44)
9. The Tom and Jerry Show (6:05)

== Personnel ==
- Hiromi Uehara - Piano
- Mitch Cohn - Bass (1–3, 6, 8)
- Dave DiCenso - Drums

with guests:

- Anthony Jackson - Bass (4, 5, 7)
- Jim Odgren - Alto saxophone (2, 3)
- David Fiuczynski - Guitar (2)

== Production ==
- Producer - Richard Evans, Ahmad Jamal
- Executive Producer - Robert Woods
- Production Supervisor - Erica Brenner
- Editing - Michael Bishop, Todd Brown
- Engineer - Michael Bishop, Ahmad Jamal
- Assistant Engineer - Peter Doris, Aya Takemura
- Art Direction - Anilda Carrasquillo
- Design - Anilda Carrasquillo
- Photography - Mark L. Baer
- Make-Up - Maria Ponsiano
- Liner Notes - Hiromi Uehara
