= Voice (Hiromi album) =

Studio album by Hiromi
- Released: June 7, 2011
- Recorded: November 9–11, 2010
- Studio: Water Music Recorders, Hoboken, NJ.
- Genre: Jazz, post-bop
- Length: 65:55
- Label: Telarc Digital
- Producer: Hiromi Uehara, Michael Bishop

Hiromi chronology
| Place to Be (2009) | Voice (2011) | Move (2012) |

Professional ratings
Review scores
| Source | Rating |
|---|---|
| The Absolute Sound | 4/5 stars |
| All About Jazz | 4/5 stars |
| Allmusic | 4/5 stars |
| The Guardian | 3/5 stars |
| The Jazz Line | 5/5 stars |

Voice is a studio album by jazz pianist Hiromi Uehara's Trio Project featuring bassist Anthony Jackson and drummer Simon Phillips. The album was released on June 7, 2011 by Telarc Digital.

== Music ==
As Hiromi says, "I called this album Voice because I believe that people’s real voices are expressed in their emotions. It’s not something that you really say. It’s more something that you have in your heart. Maybe it’s something you haven’t said yet. Maybe you’re never going to say it. But it’s your true voice. Instrumental music is very similar. We don’t have any words or any lyrics to go with it. It’s the true voice that we don’t really put into words, but we feel it when it’s real."

== Reception ==
Derk Richardson of The Absolute Sound stated "On Voice, her seventh album, Hiromi’s energy shines like never before. Much credit goes to Michael Bishop’s recording, which pushes the piano, synths, bass, drums, and cymbals right into your room where their presence—sharp-edged or rounded and burnished at exactly the right moments—pulsates against the silence. But Voice is more than one of best-engineered piano records this side of ECM; it is an hour of virtually nonstop excitement, rising to peak after peak, capped by a perfectly placed five-minute denouement that allows your burning ears to cool down." Ian Patterson of All About Jazz commented, "Voice presents Hiromi as a maturing composer spreading her wings, confident and open to all manner of influences. This is a highly satisfying addition to Hiromi's discography, and one that leaves the tantalizing sensation that her already fascinating musical journey is maybe only just beginning."

Phil Wain of No Treble stated "We certainly feel it. Hiromi’s latest album, Voice is convincing music – it has the air of authenticity, the musicians believe in what they are creating and what they have created here is a record that stands fairly unique, both in contemporary jazz and in Hiromi’s recorded output to date. You can hear the Ahmad Jamal influence fairly explicitly, while at the same time it’s definitely Hiromi’s voice here." In his review for The Guardian, John Fordham wrote, "Though she can't resist hurtling through a jaw-dropping obstacle race of swing, classical adaptations and thundering blues, it's hard to resist the childlike glee with which she does it all. Voice doesn't feature any vocals, but the theme is her journey towards a voice of her own."

== Track listing ==
All tracks are written by Hiromi Uehara, except where noted.

| No. | Title | Writer(s) | Length |
|---|---|---|---|
| 1. | "Voice" | | 9:13 |
| 2. | "Flashback" | | 8:39 |
| 3. | "Now or Never" | | 6:15 |
| 4. | "Temptation" | | 7:54 |
| 5. | "Labyrinth" | | 7:40 |
| 6. | "Desire" | | 7:19 |
| 7. | "Haze" | | 5:54 |
| 8. | "Delusion" | | 7:49 |
| 9. | "Beethoven's Piano Sonata No.8 - Pathetique" | Ludwig van Beethoven | 5:13 |
| Total length: | | | 65:55 |

== Personnel ==
- Hiromi Uehara - piano
- Anthony Jackson - bass
- Simon Phillips - drums
