= Move (Hiromi album) =

Studio album by Hiromi
- Released: October 2, 2012
- Recorded: April 18–21, 2012
- Studios: Aire Born Studios, Zionsville, Indiana.
- Genres: Jazz, post-bop
- Length: 69:34
- Label: Telarc Digital
- Producers: Hiromi Uehara, Michael Bishop

Hiromi chronology
Voice (2011)	Move (2012)	Alive (2014)

Professional ratings
Review scores
Source	Rating
All About Jazz	5/5 stars
AllMusic	3.5/5 stars
Jazzwise	4/5 stars
PopMatters	7/10
Toronto Star	2.5/4 stars

Move is the second studio album by jazz pianist Hiromi Uehara's Trio Project featuring bassist Anthony Jackson and drummer Simon Phillips. The album was released on October 2, 2012 by Telarc.

== Reception ==
Jeff Winbush of All About Jazz stated "Move operates on an entirely different level from Hiromi's previous releases. It is less exploratory, yet it never plays it safe and retains her highly developed sense of fun. Are there are moments when she needs to throttle back just a bit? Sure, as her synthesizer solos are more about sound effects than saying anything bold or particularly innovating, but carping on that is like griping LeBron James isn't as exciting executing a jump shot as a slam dunk. Even a fan will find moments where the wall of sound approach of Hiromi and co-producer Michael Bishop is a bit loud or showy for the sake of showmanship." Peter Goddard of Toronto Star wrote, "Move dazzles on the surface but doesn’t dig down deeply enough into the soul of anything."

Britt Robson of JazzTimes commented "Yet the longer you listen and learn about Hiromi’s music, the more profound and coherent her muse appears-and she isn’t about to compromise it. The arpeggios, tremolos and genre-melting proceed with a vengeance on Move, the second disc with her Trio Project, written specifically to emphasize the strength of her two cohorts, contrabass guitarist Anthony Jackson and especially drummer Simon Phillips." A new arrangement of 11:49 PM for piano and string quartet would appear on her 12th album Silver Lining Suite in 2021.

== Track listing ==
All compositions by Hiromi Uehara.

1. "Move" (8:35)
2. "Brand New Day" (7:03)
3. "Endeavor" (7:25)
4. "Rainmaker" (7:39)
5. "Suite Escapism: Reality" (5:33)
6. "Suite Escapism: Fantasy" (6:37)
7. "Suite Escapism: In Between" (7:53)
8. "Margarita!" (7:29)
9. "11:49 PM" (11:30)

== Personnel ==
- Hiromi Uehara – piano
- Anthony Jackson – bass
- Simon Phillips – drums
