= Time control (disambiguation) =

Time control may refer to:

- Time control, a mechanism in the tournament play of board games.
- Time control (electrical grid), a mechanism to maintain the average frequency of an electrical grid.
- Time Control, a studio album by Hiromi Uehara's group.
