= Original Cinema =

Studio album by Spyro Gyra
- Released: February 25, 2003
- Recorded: 2002
- Studio: BearTracks Studios, Suffern, New York
- Genre: Smooth jazz
- Length: 62:26
- Label: Heads Up
- Producer: Jay Beckenstein

Spyro Gyra chronology
In Modern Times (2001)	Original Cinema (2003)	The Deep End (2004)

Professional ratings
Review scores
Source	Rating
AllMusic	3/5 stars

Original Cinema is the twenty-sixth album by Spyro Gyra, released on February 25, 2003. At Billboard magazine, the album peaked at No. 14 on the Jazz Albums chart.

== Track listing ==
1. "Bump It Up" (Julio Fernández) - 4:52
2. "Extrovertical" (Jay Beckenstein) - 6:21
3. "Dream Sequence" (Beckenstein) - 5:01
4. "Party of Seven" (Joel Rosenblatt, Bette Sussman) - 4:51
5. "Big Dance Number" (Beckenstein) - 3:27
6. "Close-Up" (Fernandez) - 3:47
7. "Film Noir" (Beckenstein) - 6:12
8. "Cape Town Love" (Beckenstein) - 5:17
9. "Handheld" (Scott Ambush) - 4:01
10. "Funky Tina" (Fernandez) - 5:17
11. "Getaway" (Jeremy Wall) - 4:11
12. "Calle Ocho" (Beckenstein) - 5:30
13. "Flashback" (Beckenstein) - 3:36

== Personnel ==
Spyro Gyra

- Jay Beckenstein – saxophones
- Tom Schuman – keyboards
- Julio Fernández – guitars
- Scott Ambush – bass
- Joel Rosenblatt – drums

Additional musicians

- Dave Charles – percussion (1, 11)
- Mino Cinélu – percussion (2, 4, 7, 8)
- Dave Samuels – vibraphone (3, 4, 8, 12)
- Andy Narell – steel drums (4, 8)
- Marc Quiñones – percussion (10, 11)

=== Production ===
- Jay Beckenstein – producer
- Doug Oberkircher – recording, mixing
- Eric Carlinsky – additional recording, assistant engineer
- J.P. Sheganoski – assistant engineer
- Scott Hull – mastering at The Hit Factory (New York City, New York)
- Michael Bishop – surround sound mastering
