= Place to Be (album) =

Studio album by Hiromi
- Released: September 5, 2009 (JPN); January 26, 2010 (USA and elsewhere)
- Recorded: March 20–21, 2009
- Studio: Avatar (New York City)
- Genre: Jazz, post-bop
- Length: 65:02
- Label: Telarc Jazz, UCJ Japan
- Producer: Hiromi Uehara, Michael Bishop

Hiromi chronology
Beyond Standard (2008)	Place to Be (2009)	Voice (2011)

Professional ratings
Review scores
Source	Rating
All About Jazz	4.5/5 stars
AllMusic	4/5 stars
Jazzwise	3/5 stars

Place to Be is a solo album by jazz pianist Hiromi Uehara. It was released on September 5, 2009 by Telarc. The album features eight original compositions plus two covers which are intended to musically describe Hiromi's travels around the world.

== Background ==
Although most of the album is played in a post-bop style, it has classical and ragtime influences. She has been acclaimed for her technique “as the album confirms her audacious self-assurance and technical command”. Uehara's next solo album Spectrum wasn't released until 10 years later, in October 2019.

== Reception ==
Jeff Winbush of All About Jazz stated "By its nature, solo piano has a degree of self-interest, but Hiromi is never a narcissist. She thoroughly enjoys what she does and at no time does the recording come off as a vanity project by a self-centered egotist. Place To Be is an exciting and brilliant romp through the life, time, and travels of Hiromi, one of the most consistently innovative and impressive artists in jazz today." Steve Greenlee of JazzTimes commented "She has a deep affinity for the blues and loves the lower end of the register but isn’t afraid to throw in some dissonant non-chords either... It’s sheer delight, then, to hear Place to Be, a collection of 12 solos that run the gamut." Alex Henderson of AllMusic added "As it turns out, playing unaccompanied is perfect for Hiromi; the acoustic solo-piano format gives her plenty of room to explore her creative impulses. Hiromi can be quite self-indulgent at times, but she is never self-indulgent in a bad way -- and the lack of accompaniment yields excellent results for her on Place to Be."

== Track listing ==
All tracks written and composed by Hiromi Uehara, except "Berne, Baby, Berne!" (written and composed by Louie Bellson and Remo Palmier), and "Pachelbel's Canon" (written and composed by Johann Pachelbel).

1. BQE (5:57)
2. Choux à la Crème (5:30)
3. Sicilian Blue (8:27)
4. Berne, Baby, Berne! (2:57)
5. Somewhere (5:39)
6. Cape Cod Chips (5:42)
7. Island Azores (4:30)
8. Pachelbel's Canon (5:23)
9. Viva! Vegas: Show City, Show Girl (3:57)
10. Viva! Vegas: Daytime in Las Vegas (4:30)
11. Viva! Vegas: The Gambler (5:38)
12. Place to Be (6:42)
13. Green Tea Farm (4:08) (Japanese Bonus track)

== Personnel ==
- Hiromi Uehara - piano
- Akiko Yano - voice (track 13)
