= Protocol (album) =

EP by Simon Phillips
- Released: 1989
- Recorded: The White House; 18-22 April 1988
- Genre: Jazz fusion, synthpop
- Length: 27:08
- Label: Food for Thought
- Producer: Simon Phillips

Simon Phillips chronology
Protocol (1989)	Force Majeure (1992)

Professional ratings
Review scores
Source	Rating
Allmusic	2.5/5 stars

Protocol is the début album/EP from drummer/percussionist Simon Phillips. It was released in 1989 on the Food for Thought label.

Of the release, Phillips calls it "a record of experimental observations" and goes on to say "It was a good feeling to have finally released my first solo CD, and although not what I had originally planned, it was a start to my solo career." Phillips played all instruments on the album.

== Track listing ==
All tracks are written by Simon Phillips

No.	Title	Length
1.	"Streetwise"	3:37
2.	"Red Rocks"	4:35
3.	"Protocol"	4:34
4.	"Slofunk"	5:02
5.	"V8"	5:09
6.	"Wall St."	3:59

== Personnel ==
- Simon Phillips – drums, percussion, guitar, bass, keyboards, sequencer

== Production ==
- Arranged and produced by Simon Phillips
- Recorded, engineered and mixed by Steve Parker
- Mastered by Tim Young
