= David Fiuczynski =

American contemporary jazz guitarist (born 1964)

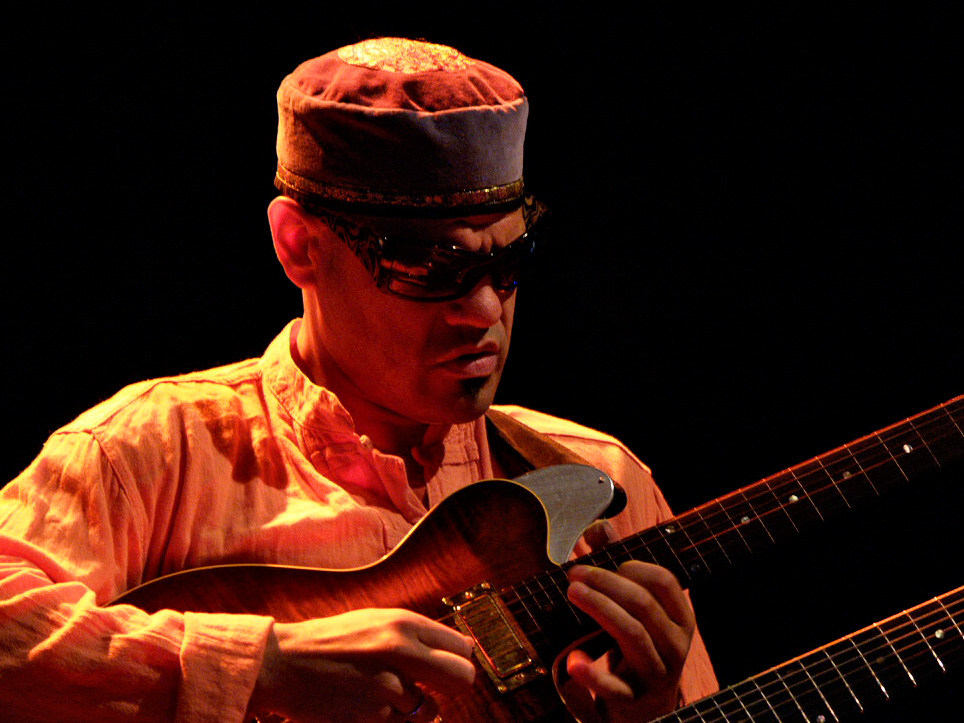
- David Fiuczynski performs at Moers Festival (2007)

Background information
- Born: March 5, 1964 (age 62); Newark, New Jersey, U.S.
- Genres: Avant-garde jazz, jazz fusion, rock
- Occupation: Musician
- Instrument: Guitar
- Years active: 1983–present
- Labels: Fuzelicious Morsels, RareNoise
- Website: www.torsos.com

David Fiuczynski (born March 5, 1964) is an American contemporary jazz guitarist, best known as the leader of the Screaming Headless Torsos and David Fiuczynski's KiF, and as a member of Hasidic New Wave. He has played on more than 95 albums as a session musician, band leader, or band member.

Though born in the United States, his family moved to Germany when he was 8 years old and remained until he was 19. He returned to the US to study at Hampshire College and later the prestigious New England Conservatory. He received a Bachelor of Music from the latter in 1989. After living in New York City for more than a decade, he now resides in Massachusetts and is a professor at the Berklee College of Music in Boston.

Fiuczynski describes himself as "a jazz musician who doesn't want to play just jazz." Many of his albums have thematic material associated with one or more additional genres. For example, Screaming Headless Torsos emphasizes jazz-funk fusion; and Hasidic New Wave blends jazz with Semitic and African music. His album Jazz Punk is a collection of standards and covers written by his idols and mentors where each tune was reworked in distinctive musical combinations.

In 2005, Fiuczynski was hired by former Police drummer Stewart Copeland for the band Gizmo, which toured in Italy in July 2005. Starting in 2007, he has toured with trumpeter Cuong Vu and with jazz pianist Hiromi Uehara, and appeared on the latter's albums Time Control and Beyond Standard.

In 2012 he started Planet MicroJam, an institute exploring the use of microtones in jazz, ethnic folk and other contexts.

Fiuczynski is the guitarist on the 2013 album Gamak by alto saxophonist Rudresh Mahanthappa.

== Discography ==
=== As leader or co-leader ===
- 1991 Trio + Two with Cindy Blackman, Santi Debriano (Freelance)
- 1994 Lunar Crush with John Medeski (Gramavision)
- 2000 Jazz Punk (Fuzelicious Morsels)
- 2002 Black Cherry Acid Lab (Fuzelicious Morsels)
- 2003 Kif with Rufus Cappadocia (Fuzelicious Morsels)
- 2005 Boston T Party with Dennis Chambers, Jeff Berlin, T Lavitz (Mascot)
- 2008 Kif Express (Fuzelicious Morsels)
- 2012 Planet Microjam (RareNoise)
- 2016 Flim! Blam! (RareNoise)

With Hasidic New Wave

- 1997 Jews and the Abstract Truth
- 1998 Psycho-Semitic
- 1999 Kabalogy
- 2001 From the Belly of Abraham

With Screaming Headless Torsos

- 1995 Screaming Headless Torsos
- 2000 Live in NYC
- 2001 Amandala
- 2001 Live!!
- 2002 1995
- 2005 2005
- 2014 Code Red

=== As co-leader ===
With Philipp Gerschlauer

- Mikrojazz! (2017)

=== As sideman ===
With Hiromi

- 2003 Another Mind
- 2007 Time Control
- 2008 Beyond Standard
- 2009 Live in Concert

With others

- 1989 London Concert Vols. 1 & 2, George Russell
- 1989 Soldiers of Fortune, Santi Debriano
- 1991 Blu Blu Blu, Muhal Richard Abrams
- 1992 Duophonic, Charles & Eddie
- 1992 Serious Hang, Jack Walrath
- 1993 Plantation Lullabies, Meshell Ndegeocello
- 1993 Amethyst, Billy Hart
- 1993 Raven Roc, Ronald Shannon Jackson
- 1994 Thought 'Ya Knew, CeCe Peniston
- 1995 Chartbusters!, The Chartbusters
- 1996 Peace Beyond Passion, Meshell Ndegeocello
- 1996 Big Music, Mike Gibbs
- 1996 Hip Strut, Bop City
- 1997 Oceans of Time, Billy Hart
- 1998 Mind over Matter, Mark Shim
- 2000 Cycles, Gene Lake
- 2001 Cherry, Josh Roseman
- 2001 Conjunction, Mike Clark
- 2001 I'll Be Fine, Janita
- 2001 Venus in Transit, Franz Koglmann
- 2002 Scientist at Work, Frank London
- 2003 East Village Sessions, Gongzilla
- 2003 President Alien, Yerba Buena
- 2003 Yol Bolsin, Sevara Nazarkhan
- 2005 Siete Rayo, Descemer Bueno
- 2009 More to Say...Real Life Story, Terri Lyne Carrington
- 2013 Gamak, Rudresh Mahanthappa
- 2015 Wandering Music, Billy Martin
