= Tony Grey =

English musician and music educator

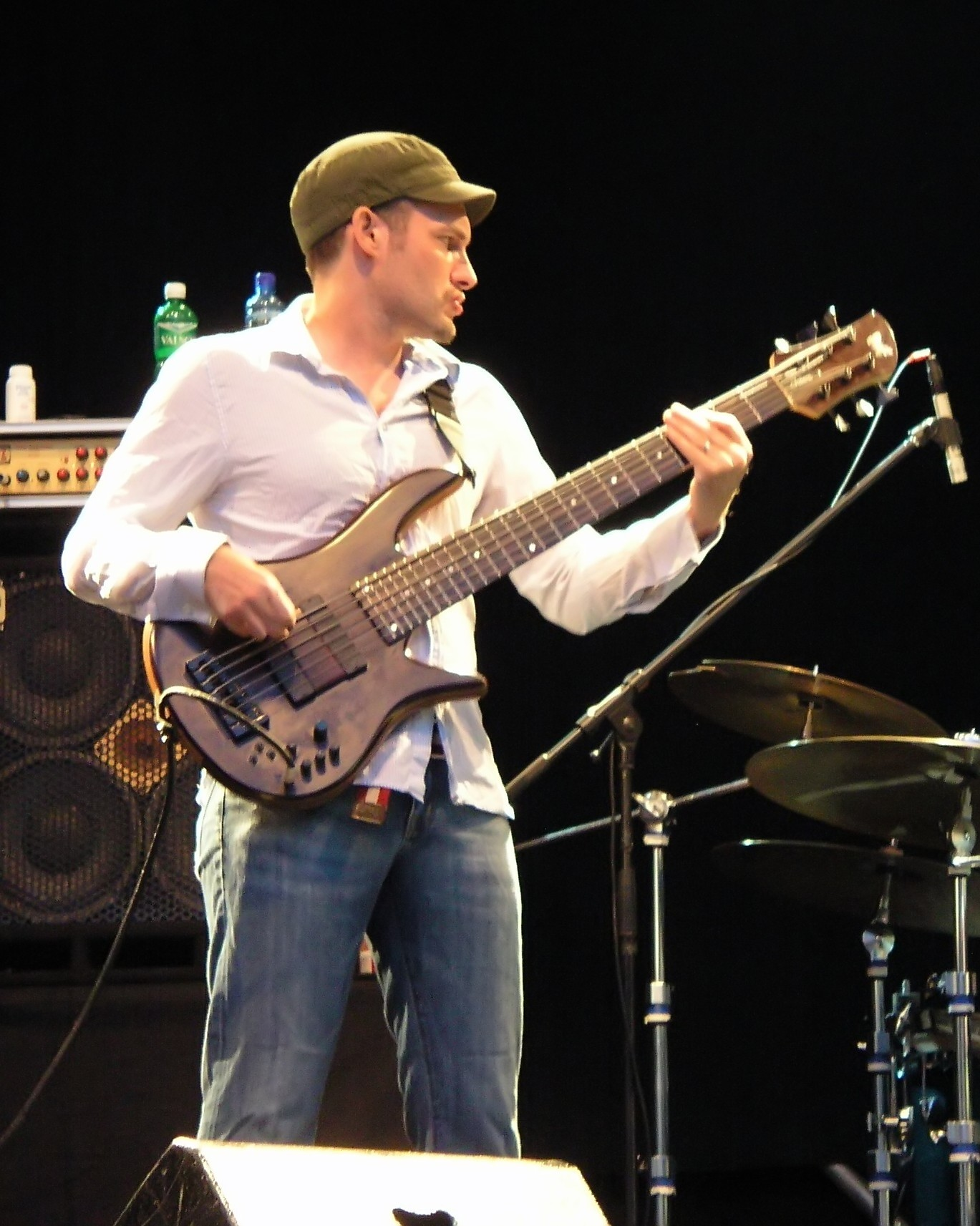
- Bassist, Composer, Author & Educator.

Background information
- Born: Antony Philip Grey; March 25, 1975 (age 51); Newcastle, England
- Genres: Jazz fusion, jazz, instrumental rock, R&B
- Occupations: Musician, Author and Educator
- Instruments: Electric bass guitar, acoustic bass
- Years active: 1998–present
- Labels: Abstract Logix, ObliqSound
- Website: www.tonygreybassacademy.com

Tony Grey (born March 25, 1975, in Newcastle, England) is an English bass player, composer, producer, author and music educator. Grey studied at Berklee College of Music in Boston. Grey has been a long-time member of pianist Hiromi's trio. Grey has also performed and recorded with John McLaughlin,

In 2004, Tony performed at New York's Lincoln Centre with David Nichtern's band ‘Drala’ for the Dalai Lama.

Grey is the nephew of jazz guitarist John McLaughlin and carries endorsements with Fodera, Aguilar, DR Strings, Yamaha, Earthquaker Devices, TC Electronic, Keith McMillan, G&H Plugs, CME Keyboards and GruvGear. His 4-string and 6-string Signature Monarch basses were designed and made by Fodera, a Brooklyn-based handcrafted guitar company.

Grey developed the Tony Grey Bass Academy, an online educational platform for students interested in a structured and comprehensive music education. The academy was initially intended to be a companion for his instructional book, Tony Grey Bass Academy, before growing in scope.

== Awards ==
- Outstanding Performer Award, Berklee College of Music, 2001
- Outstanding Contribution to Jazz, IAJE, 2004
- Jazz Album of the Year, Unknown Angels, Independent Music Awards, 2011

== Discography ==
Solo

- Moving (2004)
- Chasing Shadows (2008)
- Unknown Angels (2010)
- Elevation (2013)
- Galactic Duo (2017)

With John McLaughlin

- Industrial Zen (2006)
- Essential John McLaughlin (2007)

With Hiromi

- Brain (2004)
- Spiral (2006)
- Time Control (2007)
- Beyond Standard (2008)

With Oli Rockberger

- Hush Now (2005)

With Kelly Buchanon

- The Match (2002)

== Books ==
- Tony Grey 6 String Bass Method, Yamaha
- Tony Grey Bass Academy Instructional Book, Hal Leonard
- Vertical Fingering Patterns: 4-5-6 String Bass

== Video ==
- Hiromi Trio
- Hiromi Sonic Bloom
- Tomoyasu Hotei
