= Silver Lining Suite =

Studio album by Hiromi
- Released: 8 October 2021
- Recorded: April 28–30, 2021
- Studio: Studio Tanta (Tokyo)
- Genre: Jazz
- Length: 66:16
- Label: Telarc
- Producer: Hiromi Uehara

Hiromi chronology
| Spectrum (2019) | Silver Lining Suite (2021) | Blue Giant OST (2023) |

Professional ratings
Review scores
| Source | Rating |
|---|---|
| All About Jazz | 4.5/5 stars |
| DownBeat | 3.5/5 stars |
| Financial Times | 4/5 stars |
| Jazzwise | 4/5 stars |

Silver Lining Suite is the twelfth studio album by pianist Hiromi Uehara. The album was released by Concord Jazz on 8 October 2021.

== Background ==
Uehara recorded and produced the album in the spring of 2021. The release contains 9 tracks. She composed a full-length suite ("Silver Lining Suite") for piano and string quartet and divided it into four movements: "Isolation", "The Unknown", "Drifters", and "Fortitude". The other five tracks are also originals written by Uehara, with "11:49PM" having previously appeared on Move with her second trio. To record the album, she invited a string quartet led by Tatsuo Nishie, a violinist and concert-master of the New Japan Philharmonic.

== Reception ==
Mike Hobart of Financial Times stated that the album "enmeshes her piano with a string quartet assembled by violinist Tatsuo Nishie, concertmaster of New Japan Philharmonic, and focuses on her pandemic experiences. It takes in the anxiety of an abruptly cancelled US tour and her experience of Seattle's empty streets. It also includes the "silver lining" of live-streaming solo performances from Tokyo's Blue Note jazz club in autumn last year; it was those gigs that kickstarted the idea of performing with strings. Overall, the blend of influences remains largely untouched and she still explodes into life with the energy of rock and roll. But the flamboyance is tempered to fit the contours of Nishie's exemplary string quartet and her performance sustains inner rhythmic strength." Michael J. West of JazzTimes commented, "Never one to take a safe, familiar route, pianist Hiromi (Uehara) has composed a classical quintet for her superb new album—performed by, well, a classical quintet. That's to say that her keys merge with a standard string quartet... to play a highly melodic four-part suite with complex arrangements, as well as five additional tracks. The 'classical' in question is European classical, albeit with large jazz components."

== Track listing ==
All tracks are written by Hiromi Uehara

| No. | Title | Length |
|---|---|---|
| 1. | "Silver Lining Suite: Isolation" | 9:57 |
| 2. | "Silver Lining Suite: The Unknown" | 7:11 |
| 3. | "Silver Lining Suite: Drifters" | 9:09 |
| 4. | "Silver Lining Suite: Fortitude" | 7:24 |
| 5. | "Uncertainty" | 7:52 |
| 6. | "Someday" | 5:25 |
| 7. | "Jumpstart" | 4:59 |
| 8. | "11:49PM" | 9:56 |
| 9. | "Ribera Del Duero" | 4:00 |
| Total length: | | 66:16 |

== Personnel ==
- Hiromi Uehara – piano
- Wataru Mukai – cello
- Meguna Naka – viola
- Tatsuo Nishie – violin
- Sohei Birmann – violin
