= Time Control =

Studio album by Hiromi's Sonicbloom
- Released: February 26, 2007
- Recorded: October 22–26, 2006
- Studio: Blackbird (Berry Hill, Tennessee)
- Genre: Jazz, post-bop, jazz fusion
- Length: 61:42
- Label: Telarc Jazz
- Producer: Hiromi Uehara, Michael Bishop

Hiromi Uehara chronology
Spiral (2006)	Time Control (2007)	Duet (2008)

Professional ratings
Review scores
Source	Rating
All About Jazz	4.5/5 stars
Allmusic	4/5 stars
The Penguin Guide to Jazz Recordings	3/4 stars

Time Control is a studio album by Hiromi Uehara’s group, Hiromi’s Sonicbloom. It’s a concept album centered on the idea of time. In addition to Hiromi’s original trio, the album features guitarist David "Fuze" Fiuczynski whose technique and tonal approach gives the album its characteristic sound.

== Track listing ==
All compositions by Hiromi Uehara.

1. "Time Difference" (6:19)
2. "Time Out" (6:39)
3. "Time Travel" (8:37)
4. "Deep into the Night" (9:02)
5. "Real Clock vs. Body Clock = Jet Lag" (5:53)
6. "Time and Space" (7:55)
7. "Time Control, Or Controlled by Time" (8:29)
8. "Time Flies" (8:01)
9. "Time's Up" (0:47)
10. "Note from the Past" (Japanese Edition Bonus Track) (12:08)

== Personnel ==
- Hiromi Uehara - Keyboards
- Martin Valihora - Drums
- Tony Grey - Bass
- David Fiuczynski - Guitar
