= Simon Phillips (drummer) =

English drummer (born 1957)

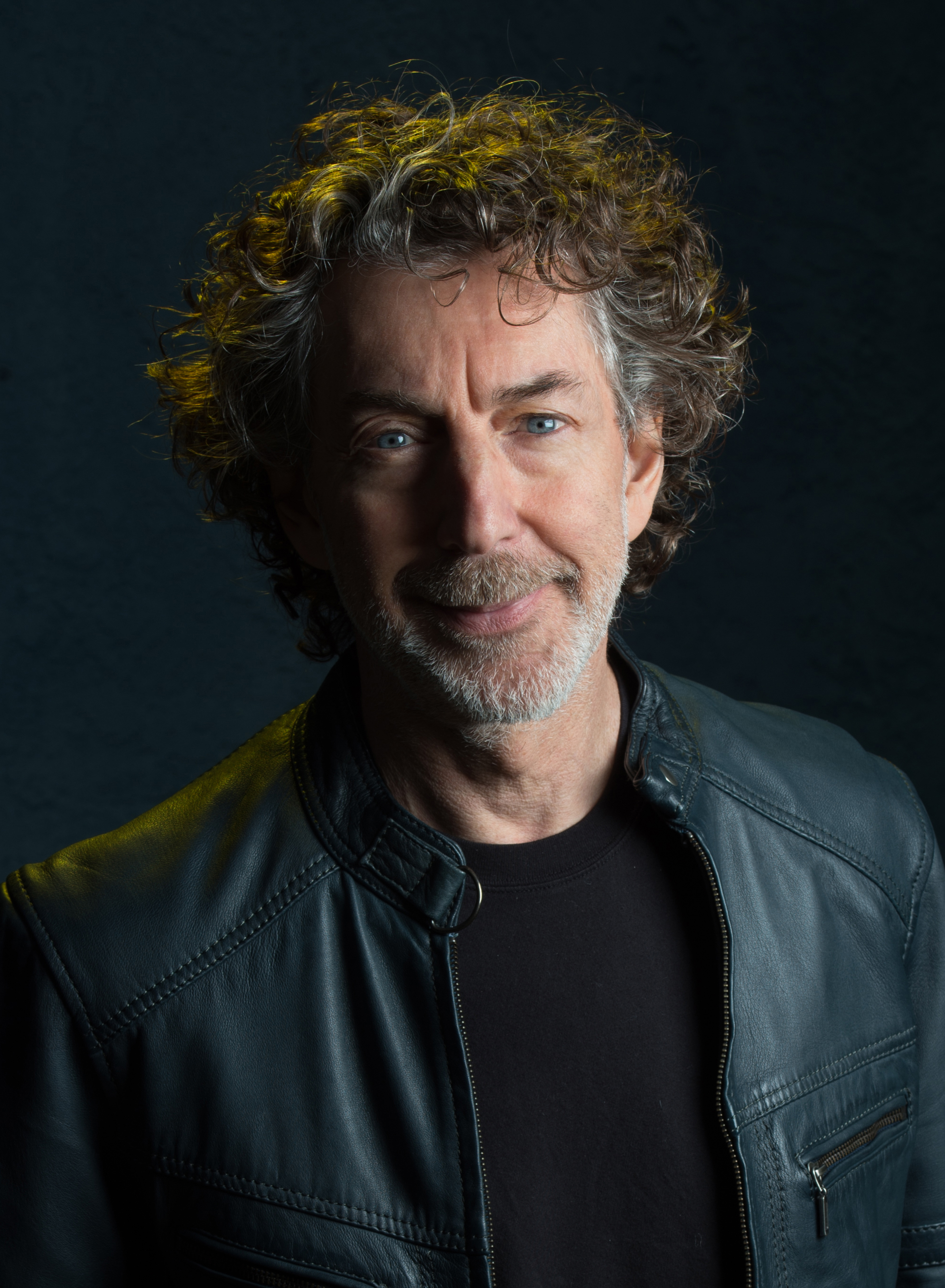
- Phillips in 2017

Background information
- Born: 6 February 1957 (age 69); London, England
- Genres: Jazz fusion; rock; heavy metal
- Occupations: Musician; record producer
- Instruments: Drums; percussion
- Years active: 1969–present
- Formerly of: Toto; Judas Priest; The Who; 801; Ph.D.; RMS
- Website: simon-phillips.com

Simon Phillips (born 6 February 1957) is an English jazz fusion and rock drummer, songwriter, and record producer, based in the United States. He worked with rock bands during the 1970s and 1980s, and was the drummer for the band Toto from 1992 to 2014.

Phillips worked as a session drummer for Brian Eno and Phil Manzanera's 801 , Jeff Beck, Big Country, Gary Moore, Michael Schenker, Bernie Marsden, Jon Lord, Nik Kershaw, Mike Oldfield, Judas Priest, Mike Rutherford, Tears for Fears, 10cc, the Chemical Brothers, Pete Townshend, and the Who. He was the drummer for the Who during the band's American reunion tour in 1989.

== Career ==
Phillips began to play professionally at the age of twelve in a Dixieland band led by his father, Sid Phillips, for four years. After his father's death, he started playing pop and rock and found work in a production of the musical Jesus Christ Superstar. He worked as a session musician for cast members, and this led to other session work. Beginning in the 1970s, he worked with Jeff Beck, Gil Evans, Stanley Clarke, Peter Gabriel, Pete Townshend, and Frank Zappa; he was the drummer in the Phil Manzanera and Brian Eno supergroup 801 on their 1976 album 801 Live.

Phillips replaced Judas Priest drummer Alan Moore to record on the band's Sin After Sin album (1977), and on that album, Phillips introduced the combination of the double bass drumming that would come to define heavy metal in later years, particularly the thrash metal sub-genre which emerged in the 1980s. The track "Dissident Aggressor" was an early example of the tempo and aggression which would soon become synonymous with the new wave of British heavy metal. Author Andrew L. Cope has described Sin After Sin as a key album in the development of heavy metal technique, in particular for its use of double kick drumming.

Phillips played on guitarist Michael Schenker's 1980 debut album The Michael Schenker Group, as well as the solo album for Genesis bassist Mike Rutherford, Smallcreep's Day. In the early 1980s, Phillips formed part of RMS with session musicians Mo Foster and Ray Russell. In 1981, Phillips formed Ph.D. with Jim Diamond and Tony Hymas. The new wave outfit released two albums and five singles, including "Little Suzi's on the Up" and "I Won't Let You Down", before splitting up in 1983.

Phillips was the drummer for the Who on their 1989 American reunion tour and appeared on solo recordings by band members Roger Daltrey and Pete Townshend.

Also in 1989, he recorded his debut album Protocol, for which he played all instruments. Wanting to make bigger changes in his music career, Phillips decided to move to Los Angeles in 1990. In 2000 he recorded a jazz album, Vantage Point, with trumpeter Walt Fowler, saxophonist Brandon Fields, and pianist Jeff Babko. Phillips also made an uncredited contribution on electronic duo the Chemical Brothers' 1997 break-out hit Dig Your Own Hole, drumming on the song "Elektrobank".

=== Toto ===
In 1992, Phillips had recently completed the recording of an album in England when he was invited by Toto to fill in for Jeff Porcaro after the latter died following the completion of the recording of Kingdom of Desire. Phillips became the band's only choice to replace Jeff for two reasons: Jeff himself viewed Simon as one of his favorite drummers (the others being Gregg Bissonnette and Vinnie Colaiuta), and that he toured with Steve Lukather and Carlos Santana on their solo tours. Phillips decided to settle permanently in Los Angeles and began rehearsals with the band. After the Kingdom of Desire tour, Phillips officially joined Toto.

As the band began its 1995 Tambu tour, Phillips suffered from back problems and was unable to play on the first leg of the said tour; the band turned to Gregg Bissonette to substitute for him. When Phillips fell ill prior to the 2004 Night of the Proms concert, Bissonette was unavailable to take over his drumming duties, causing the band to invite Ricky Lawson instead.

Phillips's last show with Toto was in 2013. He left the following year to focus on his solo career and was replaced by Keith Carlock.

=== Hiromi Trio Project ===
After leaving Toto, Phillips became a member of Hiromi Uehara's Trio Project along with bassist Anthony Jackson. The Trio Project made four albums together: Voice (2011), Move (2012), Alive (2014), and Spark (2016). The albums Move and Alive reached the top 10 on the Billboard Jazz Album charts, with Spark hitting the number one position. From 2011–2016, Phillips toured extensively with the Hiromi Trio Project.

=== Other ventures ===
Phillips has worked with Big Country, Jack Bruce, David Gilmour, Big Jim Sullivan, and Whitesnake. Phillips was one of two drummers to play on Pata's self-titled album, the other being Tommy Aldridge.

In 1997, Phillips appeared as a bandleader, performing at the North Sea Jazz Festival. In 2009, Phillips joined with keyboardist Philippe Saisse and bassist Pino Palladino in forming an instrumental jazz/funk rock trio: Phillips Saisse Palladino, PSP, which toured in Europe in 2009 and 2010. Phillips also performed on Joe Satriani's album Super Colossal, appearing on multiple tracks. Phillips appears in Alan Parsons's Art & Science of Sound Recording educational video series, as well as the program's single "All Our Yesterdays". He played in the Michael Schenker Group album In the Midst of Beauty and took part to the band's 30th Anniversary world tour in 2010.

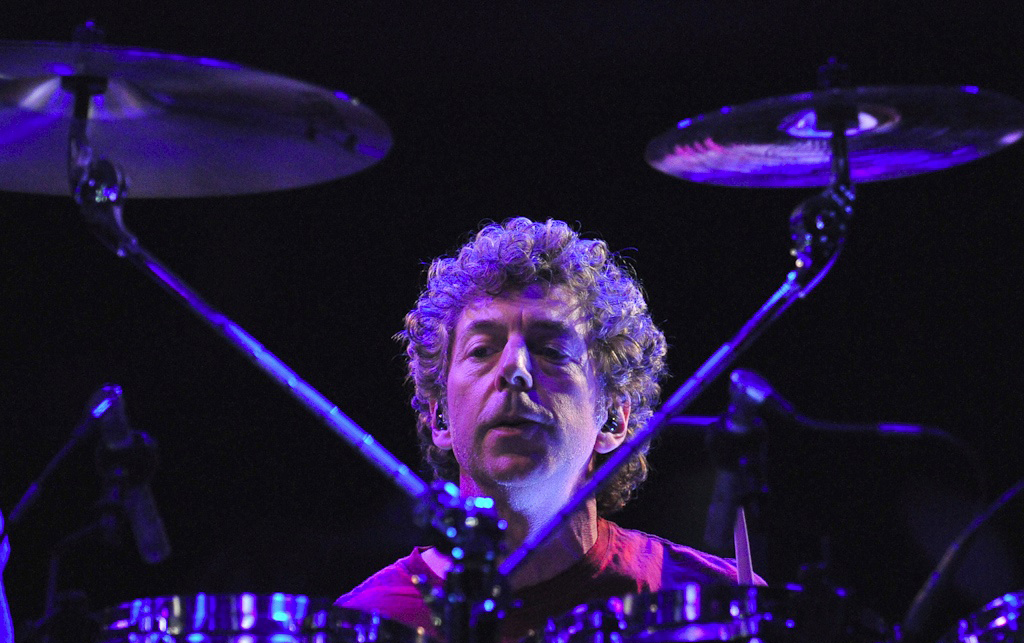
Phillips playing with PSP in Rome, 2009

Phillips has co-produced and engineered albums by Mike Oldfield, Derek Sherinian, Planet X, and Toto. In 2018 Phillips was featured on the album Origin of Species. In addition to playing drums and keyboards, he engineered, mixed, and was a co-producer.

== Influences ==
Phillips cited Buddy Rich, Grady Tate, Louie Bellson, Tony Williams, Billy Cobham, Steve Gadd, Ian Paice, Tommy Aldridge, and Bernard Purdie as his main influences.

== Awards and honours ==
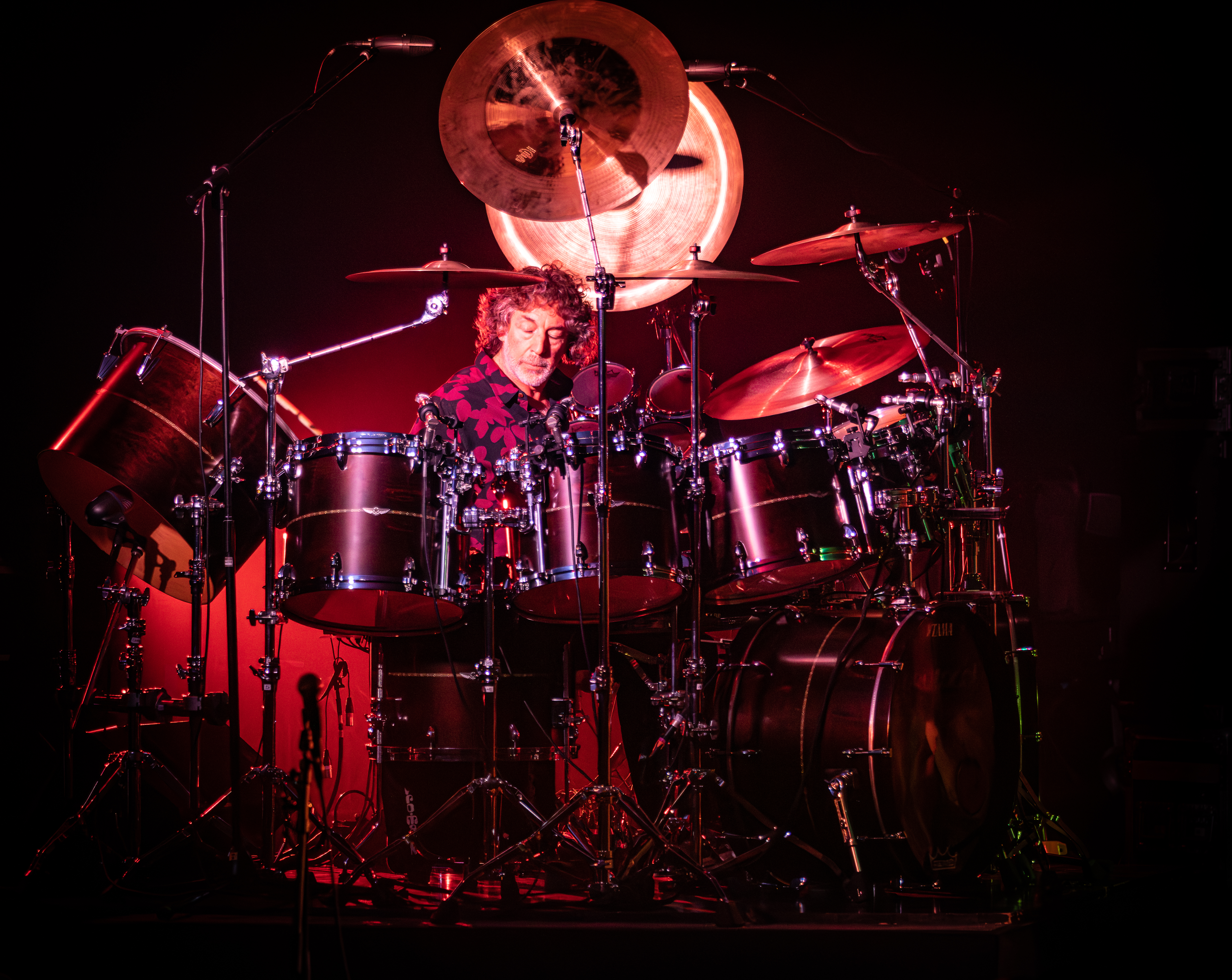
Phillips playing at Leverkusener Jazztage 2019

- In 2003 Phillips was inducted into the Modern Drummer magazine Hall of Fame.
- In 2015 at the 14th Annual Independent Music Awards, Phillips was the winner in the Jazz Instrumental Album category for Protocol II.
- In 2019 Phillips was voted #1 in the Fusion category of the annual Modern Drummer Readers Poll.
- In 2019 the Protocol 4 album was nominated for a GRAMMY Award in the Contemporary Instrumental Album category.

== Partial discography ==
=== As leader ===
- Two Generations, Sid Phillips and his Band & The Simon Sound (Contour, 1972)
- Protocol (Food for Thought, 1988)
- Simon Phillips (Manhattan, 1992)
- Force Majeure with Ray Russell, Anthony Jackson, Tony Roberts (B&W, 1993) - live album
- Symbiosis (Lipstick, 1995)
- Another Lifetime (Lipstick, 1997)
- Out of the Blue (Victor, 1999) - live album
- Vantage Point with Jeff Babko (Jazzline, 2000)
- Protocol II with Andy Timmons, Steve Weingart, Ernest Tibbs (Phantom, 2013)
- Protocol III with Andy Timmons, Steve Weingart, Ernest Tibbs (In-akustik, 2015)
- Protocol 4 with Greg Howe, Dennis Hamm, Ernest Tibbs (Phantom, 2017)
- Protocol V with Otmaro Ruiz, Alex Sill, Jacob Scesney, Ernest Tibbs (Phantom, 2022)

=== As sideman ===
With Alan Morse

- So Many Words (2026)

With Duncan Browne

- The Wild Places (1978)
- Streets Of Fire (1979)

With Asia

- Aqua (1992)
- Aura (2001)

With Big Country

- The Buffalo Skinners (Big Country album) (1993)

With DarWin

- Origin Of Species (2018)
- DarWin 2: A Frozen War (2020)
- DarWin 3: Unplugged (2021)
- Five Steps On The Sun (2024)
- Distorted Mirror (Sept 26 2025)

With Camel

- The Single Factor (Gama/Decca, 1982)

With The Chemical Brothers

- Dig Your Own Hole (Virgin, 1997, "Elektrobank")

With Derek Sherinian

- Inertia (Inside Out, 2001)
- Black Utopia (J.S.H.P., 2003)
- Mythology (Inside Out, 2004)
- Blood of the Snake (Inside Out, 2006)
- Oceana (Music Theories, 2011)
- The Phoenix (Inside Out, 2020)
- Vortex (Inside Out, 2022)

With Gary Moore

- Back on the Streets (1978)
- After the War (1989)

With Gordon Giltrap

- Visionary (The Electric Record Company, catalogue no. TRIX 2) (1976)
- Perilous Journey (The Electric Record Company, catalogue no. TRIX 4) (1977)
- Fear of the Dark (The Electric Record Company) (1978)

With 801

- 801 Live (1976)
- Listen Now (1977)
- Live @ Hull (2009)
- Manchester (2015)

With Hiromi

- Voice (Telarc, 2011)
- Move (Telarc, 2012)
- Alive (Telarc, 2014)
- Move: Live in Tokyo (Telarc, 2014)
- Spark (Telarc, 2016)

With Jeff Beck

- There & Back (Epic, 1980)

With Jack Bruce

- How's Tricks (RSO, 1977)
- Cities of the Heart (CMP, 1994)
- Jet Set Jewel (Polydor, 2003)

With Joe Satriani

- Flying in a Blue Dream (Relativity, 1989)
- The Extremist (Relativity, 1992)
- Time Machine (Relativity, 1993)
- Super Colossal (Epic, 2006)

With Jon Anderson

- Song of Seven (Atlantic, 1980)
- Animation (Polydor, 1982)

With Jon Lord

- Before I Forget (Harvest, 1982)

With Judas Priest

- Sin After Sin (CBS, Inc. (UK)), (Columbia (US)) (1977)

With Karmakanic

- Transmutation (Reingold Records, 2025)

With L. Shankar

- Touch Me There (Produced by Frank Zappa) (1979)

With Michael Schenker

- The Michael Schenker Group (Chrysalis, 1980)
- The 30th Anniversary Concert – Live in Tokyo (In-akustik, 2010)
- In the Midst of Beauty (In-akustik, 2008)
- Temple of Rock (In-akustik, 2011)

With Mike Oldfield

- Crises (Virgin, 1983)
- Discovery (Virgin, 1984)
- Islands (Virgin, 1987)
- Heaven's Open (Virgin, 1991)

With Nik Kershaw

- Radio Musicola (MCA, 1986)
- You've Got to Laugh (Short House Records, 2006)

With Metro

- Metro (TRAG, 1976)

With Pete Townshend

- Empty Glass (ATCO, 1980)
- All the Best Cowboys Have Chinese Eyes (ATCO, 1982)
- White City: A Novel (ATCO, 1985)
- The Iron Man: The Musical by Pete Townshend (Virgin, 1989)

With Ph.D.

- PhD (Atlantic, 1981)
- Is It Safe? (WEA, 1983)
- Three (Voiceprint, 2009)

With Russ Ballard

- Russ Ballard S/T (1984)

With Stanley Clarke

- Rocks, Pebbles and Sand (Epic 1980)

With Steve Hackett

- Beyond the Shrouded Horizon (WHD 2011)
- At the Edge of Light (2019)

With Mike Rutherford

- Smallcreep's Day (Charisma Records, 1980)

With Madness (band)

- The Madness (Virgin, 1988)

With Steve Lukather

- Candyman (Columbia, 1994)
- Santamental (Favored Nations, 2005)
- Bridges (The Players Club, 2023)

With Toto

- Absolutely Live (Columbia, 1993)
- Tambu (Columbia, 1995)
- Toto XX (1998)
- Mindfields (Columbia, 1999)
- Livefields (Columbia, 1999)
- Through the Looking Glass (EMI, 2002)
- Live in Amsterdam (Eagle, 2002)
- Falling in Between (Frontiers, 2006)
- Falling in Between Live (2007)
- Live in Poland (Eagle, 2014)

With Toyah

- The Changeling (1982)
- Warrior Rock: Toyah on Tour (1982)

With Trevor Rabin

- Wolf (Chrysalis, 1981)

With The Who

- Join Together (Virgin, 1990)
- Thirty Years of Maximum R&B (Polydor, 1994)

With Intelligent Music Project

- My Kind o' Lovin' (2014)
- Touching the Divine (2015)
- Sorcery Inside (2018)
- Life Motion (2020)

With Kings of Mercia

- Kings of Mercia (2022)

With Dewa 19

- "Love Is Blind" (Indonesia, 2023)

== See also ==
- List of drummers
