= Jerry Fisher =

American R&B singer

Jerry Donald Fisher (born in DeKalb, Texas, United States) is an American R&B singer – Texas-born and Oklahoma-reared – known internationally for being the lead vocalist with Blood, Sweat & Tears from 1971 to 1975. He is known to Dallas music fans for his R&B gigs from 1964 to 1972, and known in Bay Saint Louis as one-half of the husband–wife proprietorship of "Dock of the Bay," a restaurant and nightclub owned and operated by the two from 1976 to the spring of 2005, when they sold it a few months before Hurricane Katrina blew it away.

== Pre-BS&T groups ==
1964–1970: "Jerry Fisher and the Night Beats"

Beginning around 1964, Jerry Fisher formed "Jerry Fisher and the Nightbeats," a R&B band that performed in popular nightspots around Dallas, such as The Music Box on Cedar Springs, Club Village, Gringos on Oak Lawn, and the Loser's Club on Mockingbird. The band also performed nightclub circuits in Las Vegas (Caesars Palace & the Thunderbird), Lake Tahoe (Harveys), and Oklahoma.

1970–1971: The Jerry Fisher Group, "Cherokee"

In 1970, Fisher formed a group composed of members of the North Texas Lab Bands. This 10 piece group opened at the Dunes on Ross ave. In Dallas. Fisher had been performing at Sammy Ventura's, "Gringo's Club Village when a pre-Christmas fire (1970) forced the club to close temporarily close, ending the gig. Fisher, who had been wanting to have his own club, was able to obtained the lease of Nero's Nook located at 3118 Oak Lawn. Fisher restored it, named it "Fisher's, and opened it January 8, 1971." In the early 1970s, Fisher approached Earl Lon Price, a saxophonist studying at North Texas, about being the musical director of a new band he was putting together in Dallas. Price agreed and recruited the players, mostly from North Texas, which included Steve Turré, who played not trombone, but bass. The band's instrumentation was: guitar (Kenneth Ray "Catfish" Renfro; 1948–1976), keyboards, bass, drums (Wilford Dahrell Norris, and four horns (trumpet, two tenor saxes and trombone), and Fisher. Price arranged most of the music and wrote two songs for Fisher. The group worked mostly in the Dallas area with occasional trips to Oklahoma (Fisher's home state), and a month in Lake Tahoe. While we were in Tahoe, Jerry and Price flew to Los Angeles to play their demo for composer and producer Mike Post, whom Fisher had met earlier. After hearing the demo, Post said that the group sounded too much like Blood, Sweat and Tears. Price disagreed, but Post said that audiences wouldn't understand the subtleties that he was talking about. Post said that they'd hear a band with a lot of horns and a white singer who sounded like Ray Charles and they'd think "Blood, Sweat and Tears." Price then grew discouraged about the band ever making it big, despite the fact that the band had a permanent gig at Jerry's in Dallas. Price also harbored artistic differences with the drummer, which led to Fisher firing the only two horn players left – Price and Fletch Wiley (trumpet), adding a female vocalist, and keeping the drummer who, one month later, joined Sonny & Cher.

1971–1972: Recording in New York

When BS&T decided to replace David Clayton Thomas, Bobby Doyle went to New York and spent a few weeks playing and recording with the band. For one reason or the other, things didn't work out with Bobby, and Fisher was chosen as the new singer. Two of the tracks with Doyle on keyboards were recorded by Fisher at Columbia studios, and are on the New Blood album. Fisher, at the time, had a great blues band and was playing at his place in Oklahoma City. He was also recording singles with New Design, a subsidiary of Columbia Records, BS&T’s label.

== Transition from solo performer to BS&T ==
Fisher had a sizable following and was considered by one Texas music critic as "probably the greatest white blues singer in the business." When Fisher joined BS&T, he didn’t want to sing all the old material sung by David Clayton-Thomas. He wanted to join the band as a new singer singing new songs. The other members were pleased about that, wanting to move on with new material. But audiences wanted to hear the big hits, so BS&T picked the most requested ones and performed them in concert along with their current tunes. After Fisher joined BS&T, he was offered the opportunity to record a solo album for New Design; but he decided instead to focus on the BS&T. Yet, for him, for everyone, all these changes meant time spent rehearsing and reorganizing instead of recording. In 1971 The band, through Columbia Records, released New Blood, from which two songs climbed to the top 20.

== Post BS&T ==
After leaving BS&T, Jerry and his wife, Melva, spent the next couple of years biking and backpacking their way across the country. Planning on staying on the Mississippi Coast for about six weeks to produce an album, Jerry and Melva never left. On September 30, 1976, they bought the "Dock of the Bay" Restaurant and Nightclub in Bay Saint Louis, Mississippi. He performed there with his band "Jerry Fisher and The Music Company." Jerry and Melva sold the restaurant to a San Francisco entrepreneur in the Spring of 2005. Hurricane Katrina hit August 29, 2005, and there now is no visible sign of the restaurant. Jerry and Melva were in Colorado at the time of the hurricane.

== Selected discography ==
As leader of The Jerry Fisher Group

- The Jerry Fisher Group, Annual Spring Combo Concert of the North Texas Lab Bands, April 21, 1970, University of North Texas, April 21, 1970, 38141 Century Records (Convover Collection) OCLC 6907951

Fred Sherman (tp) Frank Hutto (trombone) Lon Price, Ken Maslak (reeds) George Beatty (piano) Kenny Renfro (guitar) Steve Turre (bass) Dahrell Norris (drums) Jerry Fisher (vocal)

As vocalist with Blood, Sweat & Tears

- New Blood (1972)
- No Sweat (1973)
- Mirror Image (1974)

As leader of Jerry Fisher and The Music Company

- In an' Outta Da Blues Jerry Fisher and The Music Company, Ramblin' Records (1992)

== Family ==
Jerry was born to Virgil A. Fisher and Fay Lucas 'nee. He was married to Barbara Ross in 1962. They divorced and he later married Melva Lee Luke (maiden) who had graduated in 1965 from Bay High School, Bay Saint Louis. Barbara and Jerry had a son, Anthony J. (Tony) Fisher. Melva and Jerry had no children. They currently spend their summers in Colorado hiking and exploring the high country near their summer place on the western slope of the Rockies. When winter comes, they are back enjoying the islands and the excellent saltwater fishing on the Gulf Coast of Mississippi.

== Notable sidemen with The Music Company ==
- Eric N. Watkins, bass (17 January 1952 – 25 March 2012)
