= Devonsquare =

US musical group

Devonsquare is the name of a music group of three singer-songwriters from Maine and New Hampshire: Alana MacDonald, Tom Dean, and Herb Ludwig (1947-2005) formed in 1976. The band has toured the US and Europe, and has released five CDs.

== History ==
Devonsquare originated in the mid-1960s, with Herb Ludwig as part of the original trio, along with the late Jeff Rice and Steve Romanoff of Schooner Fare. At the time, the group was best known for songs from the folk movement of the 1960s.

In the mid-1970s, several band members gradually left to establish other professional acts.

In 1990, Devonsquare performed aboard the Russian fish processing ship, the Riga, off Rockland, Maine.

Ludwig (vocals), Alana MacDonald, and Tom Dean remained together as Devonsquare and continued to perform.

In 1988, Atlantic Records chairman Ahmet Ertegün heard them and signed them to his record company. Their CD Walking on Ice was released to critical acclaim in 1988. Its title track reached the Top 20 on the national AC charts. Their next CD "Bye Bye Route 66" which was released in January 1992, with the singles "If You Could See Me Now" and "Bye Bye Route 66" which received positive reviews from radio and print media. It also earned them a nomination for "Best New Act" at the 1992 Boston Music Awards.

"Industrial Twilight", the band's fifth release, employs beat-influenced lyrics and instrumentation.

Herb Ludwig died in 2005.

== Career highlights ==
- 1984/1985 - Best New Album "Devonsquare" "Night Sail" (Maine Music Awards)
- 1987 - Atlantic Records signs the songwriting trio to a 2 record deal and re-releases "Walking On Ice" internationally.
- 1989 - Pony Canyon Records in Japan releases "Night Sail", a compilation of the first two recordings by Devonsquare.
- 1992 - Nominated for Best New Act (Boston Music Awards)
- 1992 - "Bye Bye Route 66" is released internationally on Atlantic Records.
- 1996 - "Industrial Twilight" the band's 5th recording is released independently as well as in Germany on SVP Records
- 1999 - Longtime Devonsquare singer, guitarist and producer for Devonsquare releases critically acclaimed solo CD "Your Own Backyard"
