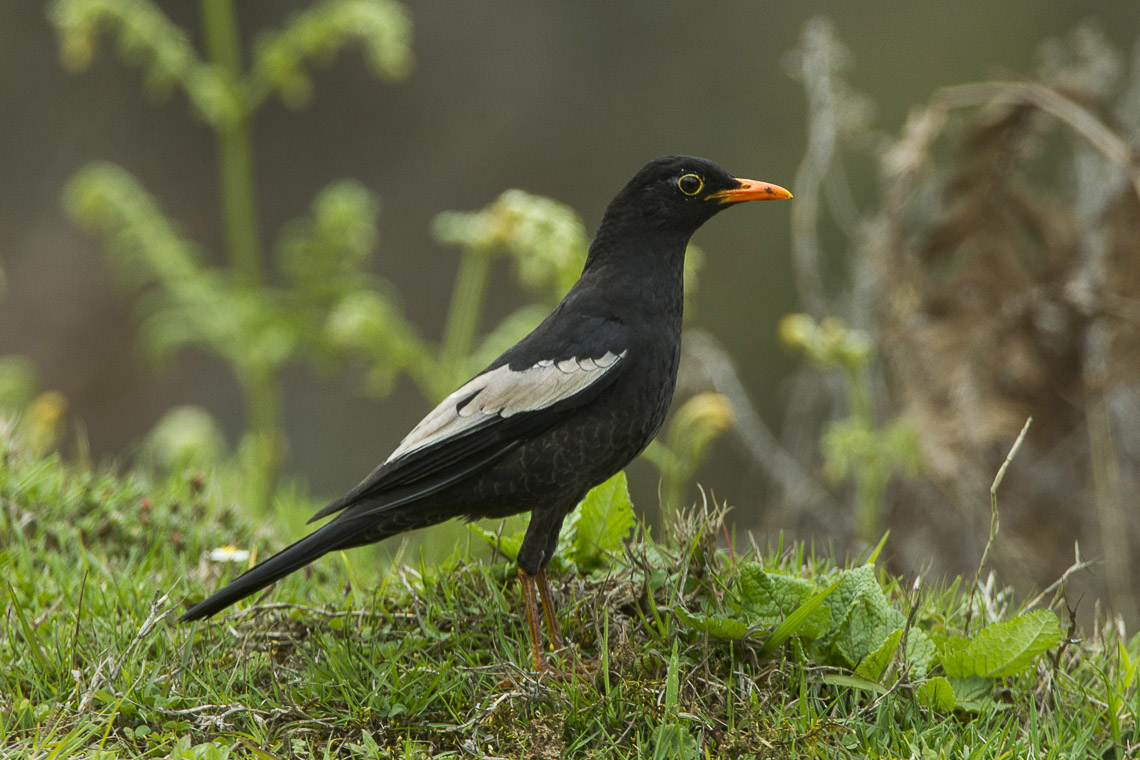
- Male, Bhutan
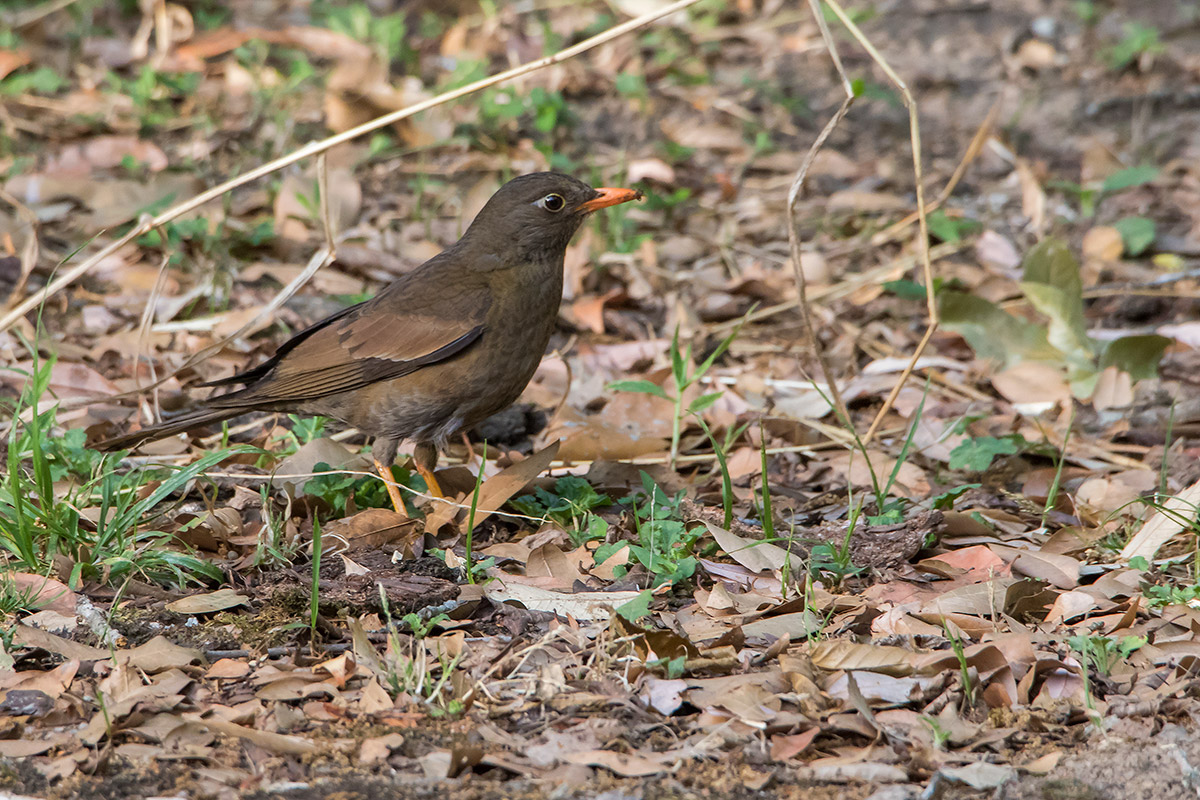
- Female, Uttarakhand, India

Conservation status
- Least Concern (IUCN 3.1)

Scientific classification
- Kingdom: Animalia
- Phylum: Chordata
- Class: Aves
- Order: Passeriformes
- Family: Turdidae
- Genus: Turdus
- Species: T. boulboul

Binomial name
- Turdus boulboul (Latham, 1790)

= Grey-winged blackbird =

Species of bird

The grey-winged blackbird (Turdus boulboul) is a species of Turdus in the thrush family, found at in the mountains of southern and eastern Asia from the Himalayas to northern Vietnam. Its natural habitat is in the middle altitudes of subtropical or tropical moist montane forests, mostly at 1,800–2,700 m (5,900–8,900 ft) altitude, but occasionally down to 1,200 m (3,900 ft) in winter, and as high as 3,300 m (10,800 ft) in summer.

It is a large thrush, 28–29 cm (11.0–11.4 in) long and 88–111 g (3.1–3.9 oz) weight, with distinct sexual dimorphism in plumage. The males are black with faint pale fringes on the belly, and a broad grey patch on the wing covert, secondary, and tertial feathers, somewhat reminiscent of a ring ouzel but more uniformly grey. The females are a plain brown, with only a hint of paler brown on the wings where the males have their grey patch. The bill is bright yellow in males, dull yellow to brownish in females. Both sexes also have a narrow eye ring, yellow in males and greyish in females.
