= Henry Gaffney =

American singer-songwriter

Henry Gaffney (1949–2010) was an American singer-songwriter and composer. He initially recorded as a solo artist, releasing the albums "Waiting for a Wind" and "On Again Off Again". In his later career he composed and wrote for other artists, most notably Roberta Flack, The Pointer Sisters, The Four Tops, Judy Collins, Jennifer Warnes, and Glen Campbell. He also composed for film and television, notably for the soundtrack to the television show "Fame", receiving gold and platinum records for his work.
