= Hiromi Uehara =

Japanese musician and composer

Hiromi
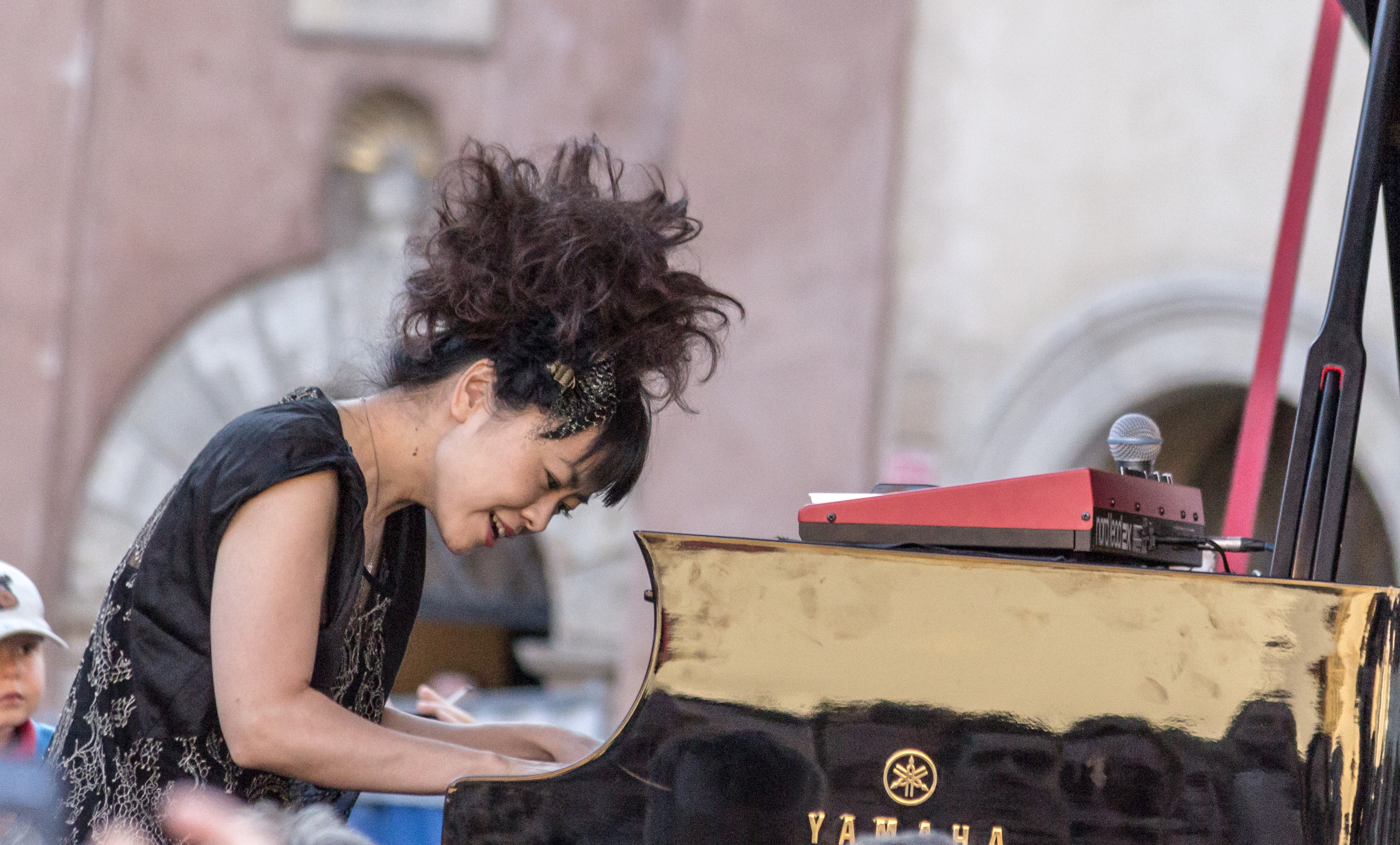
- Uehara performing in Warsaw, 2013

Background information
- Born: March 26, 1979 (age 47)
- Origin: Hamamatsu, Shizuoka, Japan
- Genres: Jazz
- Occupations: Musician; composer
- Instruments: Piano; keyboards; synthesizers
- Years active: 1996–present
- Label: Telarc International
- Website: hiromimusic.com

Hiromi Uehara (上原 ひろみ, Uehara Hiromi) (born March 26, 1979), often known mononymously as Hiromi, is a Japanese jazz composer and pianist. She is known for her virtuosic technique, energetic live performances and blending of musical genres such as stride, post-bop, progressive rock, classical, nu jazz and fusion in her compositions. In 2021, she performed at the opening ceremony of the 2020 Tokyo Olympics.

== Biography ==
Uehara was born on March 26, 1979 in Hamamatsu, Japan. She began playing piano at age six and was introduced to jazz by her teacher Noriko Hikida when she was eight. At age 14, she played with the Czech Philharmonic Orchestra. When she was 17, she met Chick Corea by chance in Tokyo and he invited her to play with him at his concert the next day.

=== Early career ===
After writing jingles for a few years for Japanese companies such as Nissan, she enrolled to study at Berklee College of Music in Boston, Massachusetts. There, she was mentored by Ahmad Jamal and signed with Telarc before her graduation, releasing the album Another Mind in 2003; she graduated later that year. That album shipped gold in Japan (with sales in excess of 100,000 units) and was named Jazz Album of the Year by the Recording Industry Association of Japan.

After graduating from Berklee, Hiromi continued to write, record, and tour, releasing albums Brain (2004) and Spiral (2006). In 2006, she formed the group Hiromi's Sonicbloom with bassist Tony Grey, drummer Martin Valihora, and guitarist David Fiuczynski, subsequently releasing albums Time Control (2006) and Beyond Standard (2008) with the group. In 2011, Hiromi won the Grammy Award for Best Contemporary Jazz Album as part of the Stanley Clarke Band.

An anime film adaptation of Blue Giant (manga) produced by NUT was announced on October 21, 2021 with Hiromi composing and performing the piano segments of the film. It is directed by Yuzuru Tachikawa, based on a screenplay by Number 8, with character design by Yūichi Takahashi (who also served as the film's chief animation director) and original music and soundtrack by Hiromi Uehara. It was originally set to premiere in 2022, but was shifted to February 17, 2023.

=== The Trio Project ===
Uehara's Trio Project brought together before 2011 the late American bassist Anthony Jackson (d. 2025), who was previously a guest on the Brain album, and drummer Simon Phillips. The group made four albums together: Voice (2011), Move (2012), Alive (2014), and Spark (2016). Move and Alive both charted inside the top 10 on the U.S. Billboard Jazz Album charts, while Spark reached the number one position.

Following Jackson's death in 2025, Hiromi has moved forward with new iterations of the ensemble which became called Sonicwonder in 2025. The current format is a new quartet, featuring Hadrien Feraud on bass, Gene Coye on drums, and Adam O'Farrill on trumpet. Hiromi is set to bring back the "Trio Project" name for a new tour and recording in Fall 2026 called the Trio Project Revival, with Simon Phillips returning on drums, and James Genus as the new bassist.

== Instruments ==
In a 2010 interview, Uehara said she plays the Yamaha CFIII-S concert grand piano, Nord Lead 2, Clavia Nord Electro 2 73, Clavia Nord Stage Piano, and Korg microKORG.

== Personal life ==
Uehara married Japanese fashion designer Mihara Yasuhiro in 2007. They met after she performed at one of his fashion shows in Milan the year before.

== Discography ==
=== Studio albums ===
- Another Mind (Telarc Jazz, 2003) – rec. 2002
- Brain (Telarc Jazz, 2004) – rec. 2003
- Spiral (Telarc Jazz, 2006) – rec. 2005
- Time Control by Hiromi's Sonicbloom (Telarc Jazz, 2007) – rec. 2006
- Beyond Standard by Hiromi's Sonicbloom (Telarc Jazz, 2008)
- Place to Be (Telarc Jazz, 2009)
- Voice by the Trio Project (Telarc Jazz, 2011)
- Move by the Trio Project (Telarc Jazz, 2012)
- Alive by the Trio Project (Telarc Jazz, 2014)
- Spark by the Trio Project (Telarc Jazz, 2016)
- Spectrum (Telarc Jazz, 2019)
- Silver Lining Suite by Hiromi and a string quartet (Telarc Jazz, 2021)
- Sonicwonderland by Hiromi's Sonicwonder (Telarc Jazz, 2023)
- OUT THERE by Hiromi's Sonicwonder (Telarc Jazz, 2025)

=== Live albums ===
- Hiromi's Sonicbloom Live in Concert (2007) [DVD-Video]
- Duet with Chick Corea (Stretch, 2008) [2CD] - live rec. 2007 at Blue Note Tokyo
- Hiromi Live in Concert (2009) [DVD-Video] – rec. 2005
- Duet with Chick Corea (2009) [DVD-Video] - rec. 2007. released in Japan only.
- Solo Live at Blue Note New York (2011) - rec. 2010 at Blue Note Jazz Club
- Hiromi: Live in Marciac by the Trio Project (2012) [DVD-Video]
- Move: Live in Tokyo (2014) [DVD-Video]

=== Other appearances ===
- Jazz in the Garden - The Stanley Clarke Trio featuring Hiromi and Lenny White (Heads Up, 2009)
- Triangle Soundtrack - Flashback (BMG Japan, 2009)
- Goldfingers - Tokyo Ska Paradise Orchestra (cutting edge, 2010)
- The Stanley Clarke Band - The Stanley Clarke Band featuring Hiromi in "No Mystery", "Larry Has Traveled 11 Miles and Waited a Lifetime for the Return of Vishnu's Report", "Labyrinth" and "Sonny Rollins"(Heads Up, 2010)
- Get Together – Live in Tokyo - Akiko Yano and Hiromi (Universal, 2011)
- Walkin' - Tokyo Ska Paradise Orchestra (cutting edge, 2012)
- Oscar, With Love - Kelly Peterson, with Hiromi in "Take Me Home' and 'Oscar's New Camera" (Two Lions, 2015; reissued by Mack Avenue, 2017)
- Ramen-na Onnatachi - Akiko Yano and Hiromi (Universal, 2017)
- Live in Montreal - Hiromi & Edmar Castañeda (Telarc, 2017)
- Chasing Shadows - Tony Grey (Abstract Logix, 2008)

== Filmography ==
- Blue Giant (Music, 2023)
