= Fodera =

American guitar manufacturer company

- Company type: Private
- Industry: Musical instruments
- Founded: Brooklyn, New York (1983; 43 years ago)
- Founder: Vinny Fodera and Joey Lauricella
- Headquarters: Brooklyn, New York
- Area served: Global
- Products: Bass guitars, Electric guitars
- Owner: Vinny Fodera, Joey Lauricella, Jason DeSalvo
- Website: www.fodera.com

Fodera is an American manufacturer of electric bass guitars in Brooklyn, New York. Vinny Fodera and Joey Lauricella launched the company around 1983 after dissolving their working relationship with Ken Smith Basses.

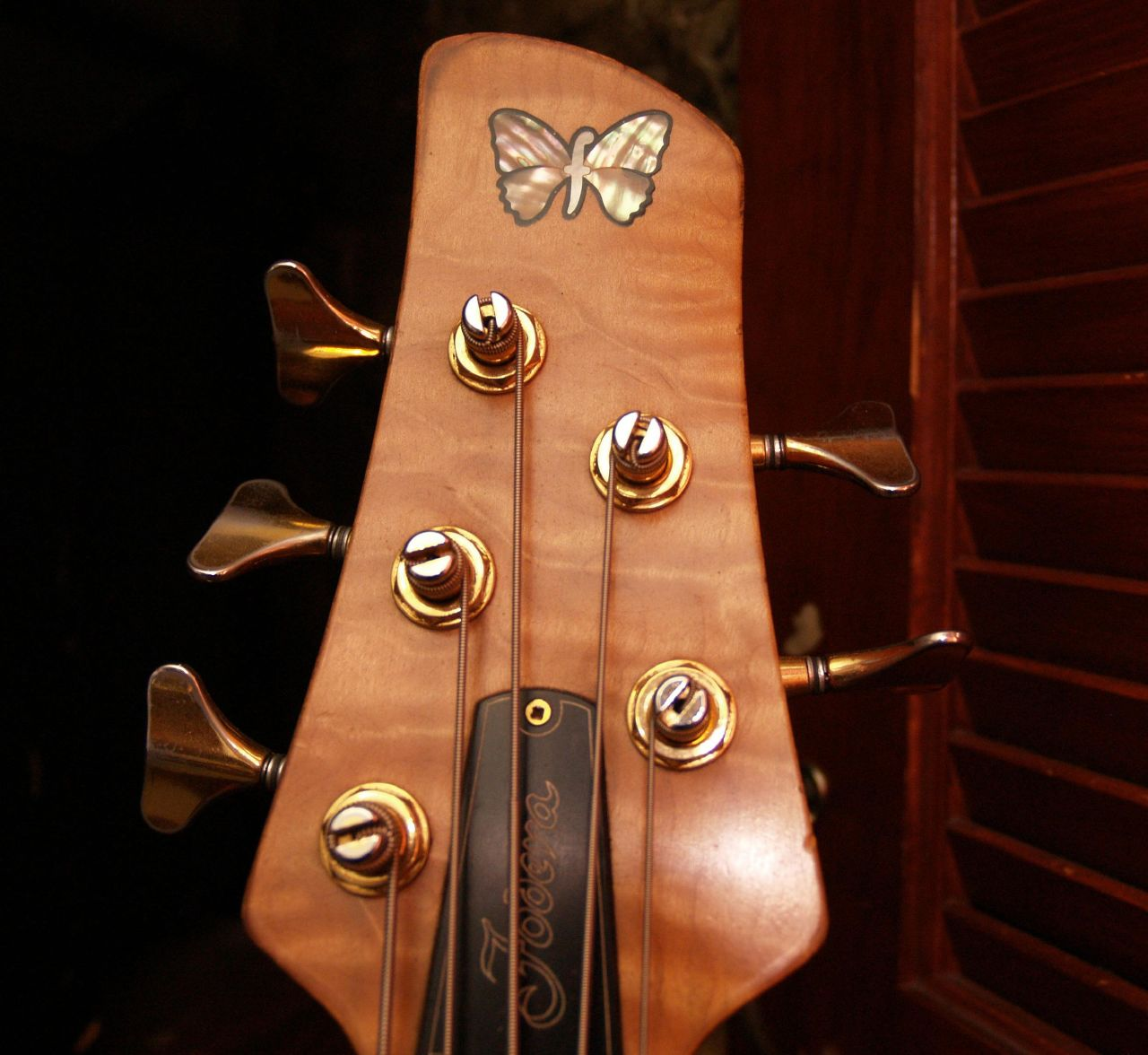
Inlaid butterfly on Fodera headstock.

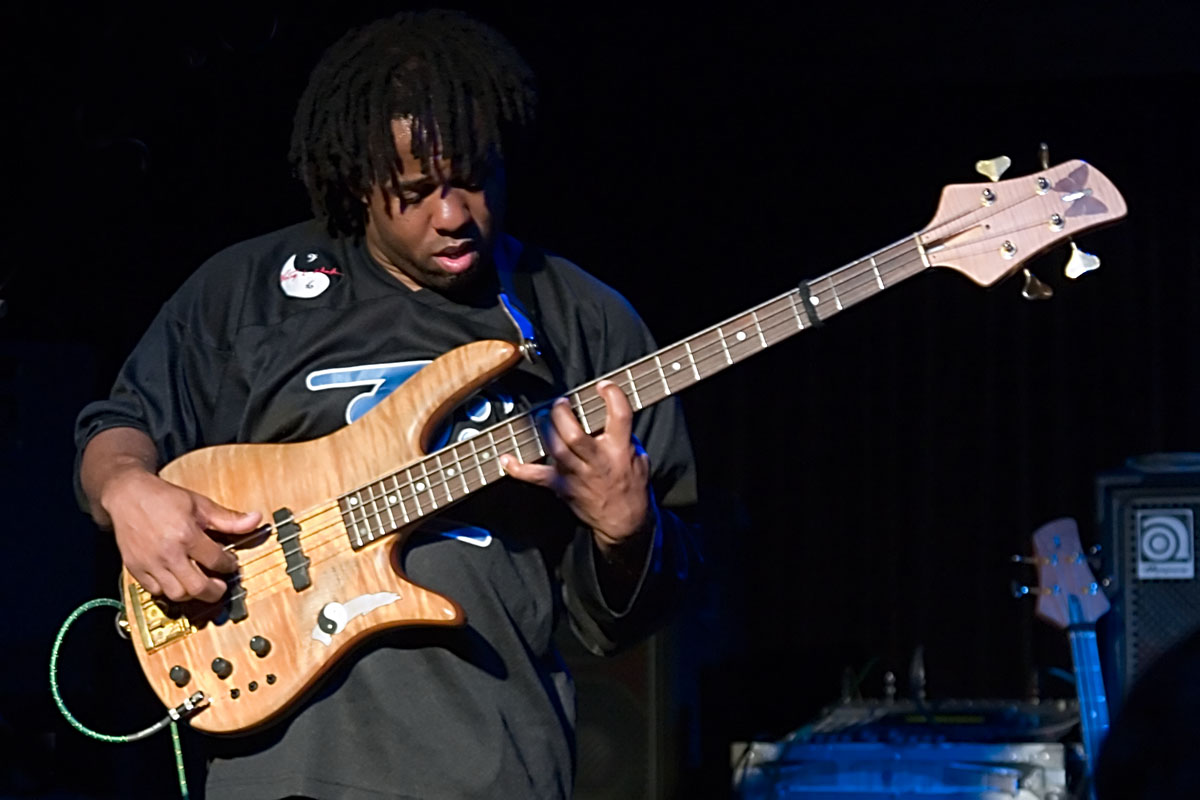
Victor Wooten with a Fodera bass.

Fodera instruments are made with an inlaid butterfly on the headstock of most basses. Other features include a single-cutaway design, an ash neck and exposed dual-coil pickups with wood covers.
