= Martin Valihora =

Slovak drummer and percussionist (born 1976)

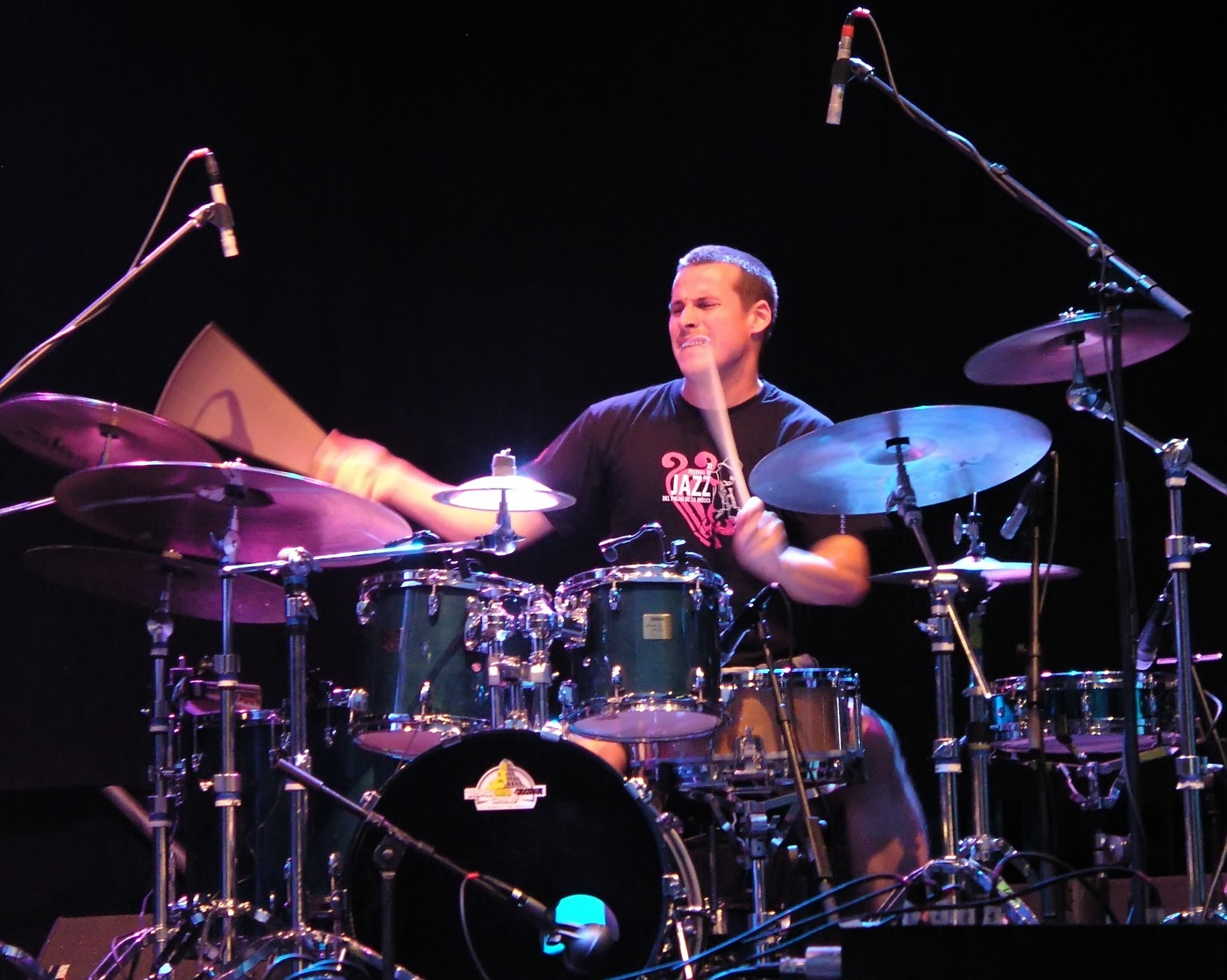
- Slovak drummer

Background information
- Born: 4 May 1976 (age 49)
- Origin: Slovakia
- Occupations: Drummer, percussionist
- Instrument: Drums

Martin Valihora (born 4 May 1976) is a Slovak drummer and percussionist.

Valihora studied piano between 1986 and 1987, but then switched to drums, having received private lessons from a Slovak drummer Oldo Petráš. He then studied drums and percussions at the Conservatorium in Bratislava (Slovakia) between 1990 and 1992 taking drum classes taught by prof. Marián Zajaček. Valihora played in numerous Slovak pop, rock or jazz bands such as IMT Smile, Collegium Musicum, Midi, Prúdy, Fermáta, Kvatret Gaba Jonáša, Barflies and Deepnspace.

Having been awarded a scholarship on the Berklee College of Music in Boston, he established himself as a part of the New York's jazz scene.

He worked with Japanese jazz pianist Hiromi Uehara for four years, between 2004 and 2008.

== See also ==
- The 100 Greatest Slovak Albums of All Time
