= Michael Bishop (sound engineer) =

American recording engineer and record producer (1951–2021)

Michael Joseph Bishop (June 14, 1951 – March 29, 2021) was an American recording engineer and record producer.

From 1972 to 1978, Bishop worked as a recording and mastering engineer at Cleveland Recording Company in Cleveland, Ohio. From 1978 to 1988, he was a recording & mastering engineer and studio manager at Suma Recording in Painesville, Ohio. Bishop's first sessions for Telarc Records began in 1978 as a disk mastering engineer on the Lorin Maazel/Cleveland Orchestra direct-to-disk release: Direct From Cleveland, the first modern direct-to-disk orchestral recording. Between 1978 and 1988, Bishop worked as a freelance recording and mix engineer on a number of Telarc Records recording sessions. From 1988 to 2008, Bishop worked as the Chief Recording Engineer for Telarc Records, keeping Telarc at the technical forefront with 20- & 24-bit recording, surround recording, DTS surround releases, 192 kHz pcm recording, DSD recording technology, DVD-Audio releases, and SACD releases. Concord Music Group closed Telarc's Production Department in December 2008, ending the run of the last full-service in-house production staff at a record label.

In 2009, a few members of the original Telarc team, including Bishop, created Five/Four Productions.

He was the recipient of ten Grammy Awards:

- 1997: Best Engineered Album, Classical for Copland: The Music Of America (Fanfare For The Common Man; Rodeo)
- 2002: Best Choral Performance for Vaughan Williams: A Sea Symphony (Sym. No. 1)
- 2002: Best Classical Album for Vaughan Williams: A Sea Symphony (Sym. No. 1)
- 2002: Best Engineered Album, Classical for Vaughan Williams: A Sea Symphony (Sym. No. 1)
- 2004: Best Choral Performance for Berlioz: Requiem
- 2006: Best Engineered Album, Classical for Elgar: Enigma Variations; Britten: The Young Person's Guide To The Orchestra, Four Sea Interludes
- 2007: Best Classical Crossover Album for A Love Supreme: The Legacy Of John Coltrane
- 2008: Best Surround Sound Album for Mussorgsky: Pictures At An Exhibition; Night On Bald Mountain; Prelude To Khovanshchina
- 2009: Best Surround Sound Album for Transmigration
- 2015: Best Engineered Album, Classical for "Vaughan Williams: Dona nobis pacem; Symphony No. 4; The Lark Ascending"
