= Jim Diamond (1993 album) =

Studio album by Jim Diamond
- Released: 10 May 1993
- Recorded: 1992–93
- Genre: Pop rock
- Length: 49.44
- Label: Polydor/PolyGram TV
- Producer: Jim Diamond, Graham Lyle

Jim Diamond chronology
| Jim Diamond (1988) | Jim Diamond (1993) | Sugarolly Days (1994) |

Jim Diamond was Jim Diamond's first studio album in five years (not to be confused with its identically-named 1988 predecessor). Featuring nine new songs and three re-recordings "Hi Ho Silver", "I Won't Let You Down" and "I Should Have Known Better", the album charted at Number 16 in the UK Charts.

== Track listing ==
1. "I Won't Let You Down" 3.57
2. "I Should Have Known Better" 4.10
3. "Hi Ho Silver (Theme from Boon)" 4.10
4. "Not Man Enough" 3.59
5. "Our Love" 3.54
6. "I Still Love You" 5.03
7. "We Dance the Night Away" 4.18
8. "It's True What they Say" 4.01
9. "If You're Gonna Break My Heart" 4.15
10. "Devil in My Eyes" 4.17
11. "Child's Heart" 4.49
12. "Goodnight Tonight" 4.30

Note: Tracks are in order as on the CD. It was different for the cassette.
