= Is It Safe? =

Studio album by Ph.D.
- Released: 11 February 1983
- Recorded: 1982–83
- Genre: New wave; synthpop
- Label: Atlantic (US), WEA
- Producer: Ph.D.

Ph.D. chronology
Ph.D. (1981)	Is It Safe? (1983)	Three (2009)

Is It Safe? is the second album from Ph.D., released in 1983. It was their last album until their 2009 comeback, Three. Is It Safe? was reissued by Voiceprint Records in 2010. Drummer Simon Philips had quit the band, which now consisted solely of Jim Diamond and Tony Hymas. The album's opening track, "I Didn't Know", failed to chart in Britain but was a hit across Europe.

Certain later pressings of the album feature the band's signature song, "I Won't Let You Down", at the end of side 1, which was originally released on their eponymous debut album.

"Fifth of May" was re-recorded for Three.

== Track listing ==
All songs written by Jim Diamond and Tony Hymas.

Side A

1. "I Didn't Know" 4:32
2. "Pretty Ladies" 3:25
3. "Johnny" 3:31
4. "Shotgun Romance" 3:26
5. "Changing Partners" 3:43

Side B

6. "No Right to Be Sad" 3:59
7. "Fifth of May" 5:07
8. "No Happy Endings" 4:11
9. "Beautiful Day" 5:09
10. "New York City" 2:26

== Personnel ==
- Jim Diamond - lead vocals and backing vocals
- Tony Hymas - synthesizers

Additional personnel

- Jeff Beck - electric guitar on 1 (uncredited)
- Ray Russell - electric guitar on 7
- Mark Craney - drums on 2, 4, 5, 8, 9
- Simon Phillips - drums on 1, 3, 6, 7
- Helen Chappelle - backing vocals
- Joy Yates - backing vocals
- George Handler - backing vocals
- Michael Rennie - strings arrangement
- Colin Fairley - mixing
- Aaron Chakraverty - mastering
- John Shaw - photography
- Sandi Young - art direction and design
- Jeffrey Levinson - executive producer
- John Wolff - executive producer
