= Jim Diamond (1988 album) =

1988 studio album by Jim Diamond

Studio album by Jim Diamond
- Released: 1988
- Recorded: 1987–88
- Studio: Gallery Studios (Surrey, UK); The Roundhouse (London, UK)
- Genre: Pop rock
- Length: 37.10
- Label: Teldec
- Producer: Jim Diamond; Phil Manzanera; Tony Hymas; Ken Gold; Adam Fuest

Jim Diamond chronology
| Desire for Freedom (1986) | Jim Diamond (1988) | Jim Diamond (1993) |

Jim Diamond is singer/songwriter Jim Diamond's self-titled and third studio album. Diamond was assisted by old friends Graham Lyle and Chris Parren, who had worked with him on previous albums.

The album featured tracks like "Broadway" (which was released as a single), "Could Have Fooled Me" and "Second Chance". "The Last Time" was also released as a single ("Miracles" was the B-Side.)

At least two tracks features Diamond's PhD partner Tony Hymas on keyboards, their first together since their split in 1983 and last until 2006. "With You I Feel Like" and "Drive Time" would be re-recorded for their 2009 comeback Three.

The album is currently out of print.13 February 2026

== Track listing ==
1. "The Last Time" (Jim Diamond, Phil Manzanera) - 3:51
2. "Second Chance" (Diamond, Paul Wickens) - 4:37
3. "The Word" (Diamond, Ken Gold) - 3:57
4. "With You I Feel Like" (Diamond, Tony Hymas) - 5:17
5. "Could Have Fooled Me" (Diamond, Graham Lyle) - 3:23
6. "Broadway" (Diamond, Gold) - 4:15
7. "I Still Turn to You" (Diamond, Chris Parren) - 4:06
8. "Drive Time" (Diamond, Hymas) - 4:32
9. "Miracles" (Diamond, Gold) - 3:15

== Personnel ==
- Jim Diamond – vocals
- Tony Hymas – keyboards
- Ken Gold – programming, keyboards (7)
- Phil Manzanera – guitars (1)
- Phil Palmer – guitars
- Graham Lyle – acoustic guitar (5)
- Geoff Whitehorn – guitars (9)
- Chucho Merchan – bass
- Tony Beard – drums
- Pat Crumley – saxophone
- Mary Cassidy – backing vocals
- Cori Josias – backing vocals

=== Production ===
- Jim Diamond – executive producer, producer (1–3, 5–7, 9)
- Michael Scodie – executive producer
- Adam Fuest – producer (1, 2, 5), engineer, mixing
- Ken Gold – producer (3, 6, 7, 9)
- Tony Hymas – producer (4, 8)
- Phil Dane – tape operator
- Mainartery – graphic design
- Sheila Rock – photography
- Laurie Jay – management
