= Ph.D. (Ph.D. album) =

Studio album by Ph.D.
- Released: 10 July 1981
- Recorded: 1981
- Genre: New wave; synthpop
- Length: 34.25
- Label: Atlantic (US); WEA; Ph.D./Voiceprint
- Producer: Ph.D.

Ph.D. chronology
Ph.D. (1981)	Is It Safe? (1983)

Alternative cover
- 1982 reissue cover

Ph.D. is the self-titled debut album by British band Ph.D., released in 1981. It was later reissued with a different cover when "I Won't Let You Down" became a hit in several countries in early 1982. The original cover was designed by Mike Payne and was the first release of his "Electrograph" artwork.

The album was reissued 3 November 2008 by Ph.D./Voiceprint Records.

The album reached number 33 on the UK Albums Chart.

== Track listing ==
All songs written by Jim Diamond and Tony Hymas.

1. "Little Suzi's on the Up" - 2:56
2. "War Years" - 3:19
3. "Oh Maria" - 2:48
4. "Oo Sha Sha" - 3:29
5. "I Won't Let You Down" - 4:21
6. "There's No Answer to It" - 3:15
7. "Poor City" - 3:33
8. "Up Down" - 4:07
9. "Hollywood Signs" - 3:23
10. "Radio to On" - 3:32

== Charts ==
Chart (1981/82)	Peak position
Australia (Kent Music Report)	29
Germany	32
Netherlands	6
United Kingdom (Official Charts Company)	33

== Personnel ==
- Jim Diamond – lead vocals and backing vocals
- Tony Hymas – synthesizers, sequencer and electric piano

Additional personnel

- Simon Phillips – drums on 1, 2, 3, 5, 6, 8, 9 and 10
- Mark Craney – drums on 4 and 7
- Phil Palmer – electric guitar on 7
- Stan Sulzmann – tenor saxophone on 10
- Jane Manning – backing vocals on 10
- Cy Langston – co-producer and engineer
- Neil Hornby – assistant engineer
- Jeffrey Levinson – executive producer
