= Ph.D. (band) =

British music duo

- Jim Diamond and Tony Hymas, 1981.

Background information
- Origin: United Kingdom
- Genres: New wave; synth-pop
- Years active: 1980–1983, 2006–2015
- Labels: Atlantic (US); Warner Bros. (Canada); WEA; Voiceprint
- Past members: Jim Diamond; Tony Hymas

Ph.D. were a British duo best known for their UK top 10 hit "I Won't Let You Down" in April 1982, which had been a hit the previous year throughout Europe.

The band was a duo, but it took its name from the initial letters of the surnames of the three performers on the group's original recordings: Phillips, Hymas and Diamond. Though drummer Simon Phillips appears on a number of the band's tracks as a session player, he was not an official member of Ph.D., which consisted of keyboard player Tony Hymas and vocalist Jim Diamond.

== History ==
Jim Diamond formed the group with former Jeff Beck Group member Tony Hymas in 1980. Vocalist Diamond wrote the lyrics, multi-instrumentalist Hymas wrote the music, and all publicity, video clips, and official album credits made it clear that the group was a duo of Diamond and Hymas. Simon Phillips, also a previous member of The Jeff Beck Group, was brought in as a frequent session drummer, though drummer Mark Craney was also used on some tracks.

The duo's self-titled debut album (1981) spawned a hit with their ballad "I Won't Let You Down", which peaked at number three on the UK Singles Chart in 1982, and number five in Australia. Following the single's success, the album was re-issued and finally entered the UK Albums Chart.

Their music video for "Little Suzi's on the Up" was notable for being the fifth video shown on MTV's first broadcasting day on 1 August 1981, despite the fact that the song did not chart in America (nor did any of Ph.D.'s singles or albums).

Ph.D.released their second album, Is It Safe?, in 1983, with Phillips and Craney again alternating as drummer from song to song. The first single, "I Didn't Know", failed to make the UK top 40, but did well in Europe.

A short time later Diamond contracted hepatitis. Prevented by his illness from touring, the group disbanded.

== After disbandment ==
Diamond returned as a solo artist and scored a UK No. 1 single in November 1984 with "I Should Have Known Better". Hymas appeared on Diamond's self-titled 1988 album, Jim Diamond. Diamond and Hymas re-formed the group in 2006. The first two albums were reissued by Voiceprint Records. The label also released Three on 2 February 2009, with Phillips drumming on three tracks. (The duo's other frequent session drummer, Mark Craney, had died in 2005.)

Jim Diamond died on 8 October 2015.

The rock band Tesla recorded a version and video of "Little Suzi" on their 1986 album "Mechanical Resonance".

== Members ==
- Jim Diamond – vocals (1981–1983, 2006–2015; died 2015)
- Tony Hymas – keyboards (1981–1983, 2006–2015)

Frequent session drummers:

- Simon Phillips – drums (1981–1983, 2009)
- Mark Craney – drums (1981–1983)

== Discography ==
=== Studio albums ===
Title	Details	Peak chart positions			
Title	Details	UK	AUS	GER	NLD
Ph.D.	Released: 1981; Label: WEA; Formats: LP, cassette, CD	33	29	52	6
Is It Safe?	Released: 1983; Label: WEA; Formats: LP, cassette	—	—	—	—
Three	Released: 2 February 2009; Label: Voiceprint; Format: CD	—	—	—	—
"—" denotes a recording that did not chart or was not released in that territory.

=== Singles ===
Title	Year	Peak chart positions							Certifications	Album
Title	Year	UK	AUS	BEL (FL)	GER	IRE	NLD	SWI	Certifications	Album
"Little Suzi's on the Up"	1981	—	—	—	—	—	—	—		Ph.D.
"I Won't Let You Down"	1982	3	5	1	14	3	1	2	BPI: Silver	Ph.D.
"There's No Answer to It"	1982	—	—	—	—	—	—	—		Ph.D.
"I Didn't Know"	1983	153	—	31	—	—	—	—		Is It Safe?
"Fifth of May"	1983	—	—	—	—	—	—	—		Is It Safe?
"Drive Time"	2009	—	—	—	—	—	—	—		Three
"—" denotes a recording that did not chart or was not released in that territory.
