= Citizens! =

English indie rock band

- Origin: London, England
- Genres: Indie rock, synthpop, indie pop, alternative dance, indietronica
- Years active: 2010–present
- Labels: Kitsuné
- Members: Tom Burke; Thom Rhoades; Lawrence Diamond; Mike Evans
- Past members: Martyn Richmond
- Website: www.citizenscitizens.com

Citizens! are an English indie rock band from London, formed in the summer of 2010. The band consists of Tom Burke (vocals), Thom Rhoades (guitar), Martyn Richmond (bass), Lawrence Diamond (keyboards) and Mike Evans (drums). Their debut album Here We Are was released by Kitsuné on 28 May 2012 in the UK / Europe and on 9 October 2012 in North America.

Lawrence James Diamond is the son of singer/songwriter Jim Diamond.

== History ==
=== Formation ===
The band formed in the summer of 2010, when Mike, Tom and Lawrence, previously of Official Secrets Act, sat together at a rather disappointing house party, listening to music. The three of them met Martyn through a mutual friend, and Thom later, after an old friend of the band suggested him to them. The reason they started the band was to make "amazing, imaginative pop music". Their bold statement about pop music is that "pop is not a dirty word, it’s a holy one!"

They named the band after a headline on a Gotham City newspaper in a Batman comic and they like to think of it as "a call to arms, a statement, a mark in the sand".

Lead guitarist Thom Rhoades is also a world renowned Carp angler, finishing as runner up in the 2013 Dorset Carp Angling Championships.

=== 2011-12: Here We Are ===
In early 2011, the band signed to French independent record label Kitsuné. In Spring that year they recorded their debut album Here We Are in Scotland with Alex Kapranos of Franz Ferdinand, who asked to produce their record after hearing one of the band’s early demos. Kapranos told the NME that "there are only three or four bands a decade that really matter. Citizens! sound like one of them to me. They do something you haven't heard before, yet you feel they've always been in your life. They sound fresh because they aren't followers - they have the balls to do something new and it sounds good."

Three singles were issued from the album: True Romance, Reptile and Caroline. An EP of these tracks was released prior to the release of the album in the US. Acts such as Goldroom, White Shadow, Gildas Loaëc and Gigamesh have all remixed their tracks.

Here We Are received generally favourable reviews from music critics. At Metacritic, which assigns a normalized rating out of 100 to reviews from mainstream critics, the album received an average score of 69, based on 7 reviews. Les Inrocks placed True Romance at number ten on its 100 Best Songs of 2012 list.

The band first began touring the UK and Europe in August 2011. They have toured with The Rapture (2011), The Maccabees, Spiritualized and Two Door Cinema Club (2012).

=== 2013 – present: Second Album European Soul ===
After completing an extensive world tour including Australia, Asia, South and North America, the band confirmed on Twitter in April 2013 that they were working on their second studio album. Their second album, titled European Soul, released officially on 13 April 2015. Its launch was supported by a two-month-long European Tour.

== Awards and nominations ==
In November 2012 Citizens! were nominated for the "New Blood Award" for Best New Band by Artrocker.

The video for True Romance directed by We Are From L.A. won a number of awards, including the 2013 Fubiz Award for Best Music Video.

== Discography ==
=== Albums ===
Year	Title
2012	Here We Are: Released: 28 May 2012 (UK/EU), 9 October 2012 (US); Format: CD, LP and Digital Download
2015	European Soul: Released: 13 April 2015; Format: CD, LP and Digital Download

=== EPs ===
Year	Title
2012	Caroline EP: Released: 29 May 2012; Format: Digital Download; Released in US Only

=== Singles ===
Year	Title
2011	"True Romance": Format: 7", Digital Download; Released: 19 December 2011
2012	"Reptile": Format: 7", Digital Download; Released: 16 April 2012
2012	"Caroline": Format: Digital Download; Released: 2 July 2012

== Other appearances ==
- Kitsuné Maison, Vol. 11: The Indie-Dance Issue (2011)
- Gildas Kitsuné Club Night Mix #2 (2011)
- Gildas Kitsuné Club Night Mix #3 (2011)
- Gildas & Jerry Kitsuné Soleil Mix (2012)
- Kitsuné Maison Compilation 14: The 10th Anniversary Issue (2012)
