= The Road to Dundee =

Scottish folk song

"The Road to Dundee", or "The Road and the Miles to Dundee" (Roud 2300) is a traditional Scottish folk ballad.

== Synopsis ==
On a cold windy night a woman asks a man the way to Dundee. He replies that it is difficult to describe, but he will accompany her along the road. He takes a liking to her and exchanges a token with her. They never meet again, but he will always remember her. The Irish version has Carnlough Bay instead of Dundee, and there is no exchange of tokens.

== Origins ==
The earliest known printing of the words was in the Buchan Observer in 1908. In 1930 the words and tune were given in John Ord's "Bothy Ballads". The tune there is in the minor key, and is not used today. The tune that is now usually fitted to the words is given in Colm O'Lochlainn's "Irish Street Ballads" (1939). This might explain why the song is claimed both by the Scots and the Irish. The Irish version of the words is "Carnlough Bay", which is in County Antrim. Edith Fowke recovered a version in Ontario in 1957. Some sources claim that it was written by Alex MacKay, from Antrim in about 1900, but without printed evidence it is hard to establish this claim. Bob Dylan used the tune for the song "Walls of Red Wing" on The Bootleg Series Volumes 1–3 (Rare & Unreleased) 1961–1991.

== Recorded versions ==
"The Road to Dundee":

- Calum Kennedy issued as a single (1956)
- Robert Wilson on At the Royal Albert Hall (1958)
- Ewan MacColl and Peggy Seeger on Bothy Ballads of Scotland (1961)
- Andy Stewart issued as a B-side of a single (1961)
- Ian Campbell on The Singing Campbells (1965)
- Grant Frazer on LP from the 1960s. FAR AND AWAY the best version.
- The Corries on Scottish Love Songs (1969)
- Glen Daly on A Glasgow Night Out (1971)
- Bully Wee Band on Bully Wee (1975)
- Max Boyce on The Road And The Miles (1977)
- The Knowe O'Deil Band on Orcadia (1986)
- Bert Jansch on The Ornament Tree (1990)
- Fred Jordan on In Course of Time (1991)
- Jim Diamond on Sugarolly Days (1994)
- Mick West on Right Side of The People (1997)
- Matthew Gurnsey on Kilted Concertina (2003)
- Elizabeth Marvelly on Elizabeth Marvelly (2007)
- Findlay Napier, Gillian Frame, and Mike Vass on The Ledger (2020)

"Sweet Carnlough Bay" or "Carron Lough Bay" or "Carnloch Bay":

- Finbar and Eddie Furey on The Lonesome Boatman (1969)
- Wolfhound on Best of the Wolfhound (1974)
- Battlefield Band on On the Rise (1986)
- Wolfe Tones on Rifles of the I.R.A. (1991)
- Julee Glaub on Fields Faraway (2002)
- Martha Clancy on The Towns I Love so Well (2004) (harp)
- The Paul McKenna Band on “Between Two Worlds” (2009)
- Roy Bailey on Below the Radar (2009)

== Lyrics ==
- Rampant Scotland
- Traditional Music
- Henry's Songbook

Lyrics with musical score

- Pub session tunes

Lyrics for "Sweet Carnloch Bay"

- Irish Lyrics
