= Three (Ph.D. album) =

Studio album by Ph.D.
- Released: 2 February 2009
- Recorded: 2006–08
- Genre: Pop rock
- Length: 49.44
- Label: Ph.D./Voiceprint
- Producer: Tony Hymas

Ph.D. chronology
Is It Safe? (1983)	Three (2009)

Alternative cover
- Also by Mark Wilkinson of Fish fame.

Three is the 2009 comeback album and final release from Ph.D. It was their first album since 1983's Is It Safe?.

== Track listing ==
All songs written by Jim Diamond and Tony Hymas, except where noted.

1. A Land of Your Own 5.05
2. With You I Feel Like+ 5.32
3. Drive Time+ 5.52
4. Precious Cargo 6.40
5. Got to Believe 5.37
6. We All Fall Down 4.33
7. Said and Done 5.31
8. Fifth of May++ 6.34
9. What Becomes of the Brokenhearted?+++ (James Dean, Paul Riser, William Weatherspoon) 4.25

+ Originally recorded for Jim Diamond (1988).
++ Originally recorded for Is It Safe?.
+++ Originally recorded by Jimmy Ruffin.

== Personnel ==
- Jim Diamond - vocals
- Tony Hymas - keyboards, production, programming, mixing, engineering

Additional personnel

- Simon Phillips - drums on 1, 3, and 4
- Jeff Lee Johnson - guitar on 3 and 9
- Tom Hymas - production assistance
- Mark Wilkinson - artwork
