= Double Crossed =

Studio album by Jim Diamond
- Released: 1985
- Recorded: 1984–85
- Studios: Chipping Norton Recording Studios (Chipping Norton, Oxfordshire, UK); Compass Point Studios (Nassau, Bahamas)
- Genres: Soft rock; power ballad
- Label: A&M
- Producers: Jim Diamond (track 6) Pip Williams

Jim Diamond chronology
Double Crossed (1985)	Desire for Freedom (1986)

Double Crossed is the debut solo album by Jim Diamond, released in 1985. The album features Diamond's first three solo singles, "I Should Have Known Better", "I Sleep Alone at Night" and "Remember I Love You". The album was dedicated to Diamond's father who had recently died. Diamond would later write "Hi Ho Silver" as a tribute song to his father. "Hi Ho Silver" was featured on Diamond's second solo album Desire for Freedom. The album was reissued on 21 April 2009 through Cherry Pop Records.

== Track listing ==
All tracks composed by Jim Diamond and Chris Parren; except where indicated.

Side One

1. "Double Crossed" - 3:51
2. "I Sleep Alone at Night" - 4:57
3. "After the Fire" - 4:06
4. "I Should Have Known Better" (Diamond, Graham Lyle) - 4:06
5. "Stumblin' Over" - 4:15

Side Two

1. "Remember I Love You" (Diamond, Graham Lyle) - 3:52
2. "New Generation" - 5:04
3. "Co-Operation" - 5:58
4. "She Is Woman" - 4:32
5. "I'm Yours" - 4:50

=== Track Listing (European release) ===
1. "Double Crossed" - 3:51
2. "I Sleep Alone at Night" - 4:57
3. "After the Fire" - 4:06
4. "I Should Have Known Better" - 4:06
5. "Stumblin' Over" - 4:15
6. "New Generation" - 5:04
7. "Co-Operation" - 5:58
8. "She Is Woman" - 4:32
9. "I'm Yours" - 4:50
10. "Impossible Dream - 4:35
11. "Caledonia" - 5:11

== Personnel ==
- Jim Diamond – all vocals
- Chris Parren – keyboards
- Paul "Wix" Wickens – keyboards
- Zoot Money – Hammond organ on "I'm Yours"
- Colin Pincott – guitars
- Graham Lyle – acoustic guitar on "I Should Have Known Better" and "I'm Yours"
- Pip Williams – additional guitars and guitar solo on "Stumblin' Over"
- Earl Slick – guitars on "Co-Operation" and "Impossible Dream"
- John McKenzie – bass
- Simon Kirke – drums
- Martin Ditcham – percussion
- Dick Morrissey – saxophone on "Double Crossed", "After the Fire" and "She Is Woman"

=== Production ===
- Pip Williams – producer
- Eric "ET" Thorngren – remixing
- Michael Ross – art direction, design
- Simon Adamczewski – art direction assistant, design assistant
- Brian Griffin – photography
- Tobi Corney – back cover photography
- Paul Cox – inner sleeve photography
- Diamond Brothers Music – management

== See also ==
- Desire for Freedom
- Jim Diamond (singer)
