= I Should Have Known Better (Jim Diamond song) =

Single by Jim Diamond

from the album Double Crossed
- Released: 26 October 1984
- Recorded: 1984
- Genre: Soft rock, power ballad
- Length: 4:10
- Label: A&M
- Songwriters: Jim Diamond; Graham Lyle
- Producers: Jim Diamond; Pip Williams

Jim Diamond singles chronology
"Clean Up the City" (1976)	"I Should Have Known Better" (1984)	"I Sleep Alone at Night" (1985)

"I Should Have Known Better" is a song by Jim Diamond, released in 1984 as the lead single from his debut solo album Double Crossed (1985). It was a UK number one single for one week in December 1984. The song was displaced after one week by Frankie Goes to Hollywood's song "The Power of Love". Diamond publicly requested that people not buy his single, but instead buy the charity single "Do They Know It's Christmas?" by Band Aid.

"I Should Have Known Better" was re-recorded for Diamond's 1993 solo album Jim Diamond. He recorded the song a third time for his 2005 single "Blue Shoes", which also featured a re-recording of "I Won't Let You Down" and covers of old soul songs such as "My Girl".

== Personnel ==
- Jim Diamond – vocals
- Colin Pincott – lead and rhythm guitar
- John McKenzie – bass
- Graham Lyle – acoustic guitar
- Pip Williams – guitar solo
- Chris Parren – synthesizer
- Simon Kirke – drums

== Charts ==
=== Weekly charts ===
Chart (1984–85)	Peak position
Australia (Kent Music Report)	1
Belgium (Ultratop 50 Flanders)	3
Finland (Suomen virallinen lista)	22
France (IFOP)	46
Ireland (IRMA)	1
Italy (FIMI)	5
Netherlands (Dutch Top 40)	2
Netherlands (Single Top 100)	7
New Zealand (Recorded Music NZ)	48
Norway (VG-lista)	2
Portugal (Associação Fonográfica Portuguesa)	1
South Africa (Springbok)	4
Spain (AFYVE)	11
Switzerland (Schweizer Hitparade)	3
UK Singles (OCC)	1
West Germany (GfK)	15

=== Year-end charts ===
Chart (1984)	Position
UK Singles (Official Charts Company)	15

Chart (1985)	Position
Australia (Kent Music Report)	9
Belgium (Ultratop Flanders)	42
Netherlands (Dutch Top 40)	44
Netherlands (Single Top 100)	100

== Cover versions ==
The song was covered in French by Julie Pietri ("À force de toi"). It was also covered in Italian by Matteo Becucci ("Lo avrei dovuto sapere"), as part of a compilation that showcased the contestants of the second season of The X-Factor Italia. A Spanish version of the song, "Te Veo Pasar" was recorded by Yolandita Monge for her album Luz de Luna.
