= List of Boon episodes =

Boon is a British television drama series made by Central Independent Television. Seven series and two specials were produced, and it was broadcast on ITV between 14 January 1986 and 1 May 1995. It was created by Jim Hill and Bill Stair, and it starred Michael Elphick, David Daker, Neil Morrissey, Elizabeth Carling, Amanda Burton, Saskia Wickham, Rachel Davies, Lesley-Anne Sharpe and Brigit Forsyth. It centres on Ken Boon (Elphick), an ex-fireman who becomes a freelance troubleshooter after he is encouraged by his former colleague Harry Crawford (Daker) to take on extra work. As Ken becomes more experienced in this role, he gradually becomes a private investigator, which eventually turns into a full-time occupation. Meanwhile, Harry takes on a number of business endeavours, including bar owner, hotelier and ballroom manager. By Series 5, he collaborates with Ken to set up a new business, Crawford Boon Security, where Harry organizes the security operations whilst Ken oversees private investigations; their paths cross frequently and they assist each other with their endeavours. They are assisted by a number of characters, including Rocky Cassidy (Morrissey), Laura Marsh (Carling), Margaret Daly (Burton), Alex Wilton (Wickham), Doreen Evans (Davies), Debbie Yates (Sharpe) and Helen Yeldman (Forsyth). The series was originally set in Birmingham, changing location to Nottingham in Series 4 when Central moved production to their new studios in the area.

== Series overview ==
Series	Episodes	Originally released	
Series	Episodes	First released	Last released
1	13	14 January 1986	8 April 1986
2	13	17 February 1987	1 December 1987
3	13	1 November 1988	24 January 1989
4	13	2 October 1989	20 December 1989
5	13	25 September 1990	19 December 1990
6	13	24 September 1991	17 December 1991
Christmas Special		24 December 1991	
7	13	8 September 1992	1 December 1992
Special		1 May 1995	

== Episodes ==
=== Series 1 (1986) ===
The first series is primarily set at the Grand, a seedy little hotel in Birmingham, West Midlands. Much of the first series sees Ken offering his services for odd jobs as a means of supplementing his finances towards the funding of The Ponderosa, a market garden which he has set up in a village ten miles outside of Birmingham. Ken is soon offered a variety of jobs, from child minding to piloting a canal boat along the Grand Union Canal. He soon develops an interest as a private detective and gradually promotes himself as a freelance troubleshooter. Although this series was filmed on location around Birmingham, most of the interiors were filmed in the studio at Central's facilities in Broad Street, Birmingham. In contrast to subsequent series that were entirely filmed on location, this series used a mixture of interiors shot on videotape and exteriors shot on 16mm film, a practice that was still commonplace in TV production at the time.

No.	Title	Directed by	Written by	Original release date
1	"Box 13"	Laurence Moody	Bill Stair, Jim Hill	14 January 1986
After finding himself invalided from the fire service when his lungs were damaged while rescuing a young boy during a blaze, Ken Boon buys a plot that he calls The Ponderosa and tries to make a living as a market gardener. After he gets into debt, his former colleague Harry Crawford, who now runs a hotel, The Grand, offers Ken his assistance. He suggests that Ken should offer his services for odd jobs as a means of supplementing his income towards his market garden, and despite Ken's protestations, he places an advert in the local paper. His first client is music promoter Barney Spitz (John Sessions), who wants Ken to dress up as a fireman for a publicity stunt for the band he represents. First appearance of Rachel Davies as Doreen Evans, Joan Scott as Ethel Allard, Bill Gavin as Nick and John Arthur as John.
2	"Fools Rush In"	Ian Knox	Bill Stair, Jim Hill	21 January 1986
Late one night, a dishevelled Irishman (Stephen Rea) arrives at the hotel and demands Harry to give him a room. A few days later, Harry alerts Ken about this man, who has now been residing at the hotel for several days. The man informs Ken that he has lost his memory and has no idea why he has a large bundle of cash in his possession. Soon a crooked local car dealer, Tom McGeary (Gregor Fisher), and his two heavies demand the cash back from him, which adds to Ken's worries. After Ken finds out that the man is known as Frank Warren, he decides to investigate and find out more about this mysterious man's background.
3	"Answers to the Name of Watson"	Laurence Moody	Francis Megahy	28 January 1986
A husband and wife circus act, Arturo (Frederick Warder) and Elena Sandini (Shirin Taylor), arrive at the hotel and inform Ken about their missing cat named Watson. He is curious why they have not reported this to the police, but they inform him they do not want to attract any publicity. He soon delves into the investigation and finds out that the cat has been stolen by a group of activists seeking to make a publicity stunt, and finds out to his surprise that Watson is no ordinary cat, but an adult lion that is a part of the Sandinis' lion-taming act. He goes undercover as an eco activist in order to infiltrate the group's hideout and rescue the lion.
4	"Grass Widows"	Ian Knox	Anthony Minghella	4 February 1986
Whilst sorting through the hotel books, Doreen finds some unpaid bills belonging to a man who has since died. Later on, Doreen, Ken and Harry visit the deceased man's widow, Meg Lucie (Barbara Ewing), and find her garden and finances in disarray. They offer her their assistance, and whilst Ken and Harry sort out her garden, Doreen goes through Meg's books. She soon discovers more than just Meg's garden has spiraled out of control, and makes the connection that her husband was having an affair, which places Doreen in an awkward situation over whether to inform Meg about her husband's infidelity. Meanwhile, after Gavin retires, Harry employs a new porter, Hanif. He also hires a barman, Lionel (John Landry); soon Lionel's racist behaviors towards Hanif and some of the Asian guests residing at the hotel becomes a problem, and Harry tries to work out a way to sack him. First appearance of Gordon Warnecke as Hanif Kurtha; last appearance of Bill Gavin as Nick.
5	"Unto Us Four a Son"	Laurence Moody	Gary Meredith	11 February 1986
Ken is employed to look after Daniel Greenaway (Nicholas Simpson), the difficult son of former pop star Laurie Langley (Linda Marlowe), who suspects that her ex-husband Geoff Greenaway (Warren Clarke) is out to kidnap her son. Soon Ken finds out that Daniel has been attacked outside of his school and discovers that a criminal gang have been targeting him. Meanwhile, a mysterious stranger named Cormack (George Irving) has been spotted following Daniel, and Ken delves into Cormack's connection with the matter.
6	"Glasshouse People"	Ian Knox	Paul Wheeler	18 February 1986
Harry wakes up in the middle of the night to find that the hotel's windows and crockery have been smashed. He employs Ken to investigate and root out a local protection racket that has been targeting the hotel lately. Meanwhile, Patsy (Tracie Bennett), a young woman who has been staying at the hotel, befriends another guest, befuddled businessman Sidney Garbutt (Richard Griffiths), whom she soon finds out has lost his memory. Ken, Harry and Doreen are keen to find out the cause for this.
7	"Northwest Passage to Acock's Green"	Laurence Moody	Douglas Watkinson	25 February 1986
Ken and Doreen have been employed by Irish businessman Enroll McLaverty (T.P. McKenna) to sail a barge along the Grand Union Canal from Hemel Hempstead to Birmingham, which gives them the opportunity to spend a romantic weekend away from the hotel. However, they are soon confronted by two criminals, Appleby (William Simons) and Laing (Dave Hill), who are particularly interested in the contents of their cargo. They discover that escaped convict Alan Prendergast (Larry Lamb) has been hiding in their boat, and that they unwittingly have been hired by McLaverty to smuggle Alan back to his father, Walter (Ralph Nossek).
8	"Something Old, Something New"	Graham Theakston	Andrew McCulloch, John Flanagan	4 March 1986
Business is beginning to pick up for Ken at the Ponderosa when Harry enlists him to travel to London and recover some antiques which have been defrauded from an old man, Murdoch Johnstone (Andrew Keir), by corrupt antique dealers Phillip Banks (Richard Heffer) and Georgina Pemberton (Michelle Newell), who are out on the prowl to con their next victim. Meanwhile, Harry is confronted by a mysterious guest, Mr Dudley (John Ewits), whom he suspects may be a hotel inspector when he starts making enquiries about the hotel.
9	"For Whom the Chimes Toll"	Brian Morgan	Geoff McQueen	11 March 1986
A retired serviceman, Major Hopkinson (Maurice Denham), employs Ken to look after his collection of antique clocks after he has been targeted by a pair of criminals who are after his money. However, Ken is dubious about the Major's honesty and is keen to find out his real motives. Meanwhile, Doreen is faced with a difficult dilemma when her ex-husband Jack returns and tries to seek a reconciliation. First appearance of Donald Sumpter as Jack Evans.
10	"Jack of All Tradesman"	Graham Theakston	Bill Stair, Jim Hill	18 March 1986
Ken is hired by a dodgy local businessman to track down brothers Niall (Charles Lawson) and Sean Mahoney (Sean Lawlor) when they become implicated over a scheme by an irate bookie. Although Ken has his misgivings, he takes up the job despite Doreen's protestations. Subsequently, Ken embarks on an endless search through Birmingham's pubs in order to find the pair.
11	"Billy the Kid"	Brian Morgan	Peter Barwood	25 March 1986
Harry is organizing a charity match between the local fire brigade and an all-star team of former professional footballers. One of the players he signs up for the All Stars is Billy 'The Kid' Buchan (Malcolm Jameson), an out-of-work Scottish footballer who is pipped to be the star attraction of the match. Billy proves more trouble than he is worth when they discover that he is a raging alcoholic. His manager Peter Grant (Brendan Price) hires Ken to act as his minder and prevent him from drinking, as he is keen to sign Billy up for a Saudi Arabian football team. Meanwhile, the Ponderosa is targeted by young hooligans who have trashed Ken's greenhouse and destroyed his entire stock. Last appearance of John Arthur as John.
12	"Grand Expectations"	Graham Theakston	Francis Galleymore	1 April 1986
Whilst riding down a country lane, Ken falls off his motorbike 'White Lightning' and damages it in the process. He takes it to a motorbike repair shop, Alpha Bikes, which is run by Narain Singh (Gurdial Sira) and his nephew Ranjit (Travneer Ghani). Whilst working on his bike one evening, he overhears Ranjit having an argument with his wife Surinder (Sneh Gupta), and she soon escapes and seeks refuge at the Grand. Harry and Ken are keen to defuse the situation, since the Singhs insist that Ken will only get his bike back if he returns Surinder to them. Concurrently, Jack turns up at the hotel and asks Doreen to help out his friend Les Rickett (Roger Walker), a builder who has gone into financial difficulties. Last appearance of Donald Sumpter as Jack Evans.
13	"Full Circle"	Laurence Moody	Guy Meredith	8 April 1986
A few days after Christmas, Ken returns home from London to find his market garden desolated. Meanwhile, Harry is keen to sell the Grand and move to a larger hotel, whilst Doreen is preparing to leave them after accepting a new job running a friend's bar in Spain. Concurrently, a series of arsonist attacks have been reported over town lately, and Ken delves into the investigation when he suspects that the arsonist is linked to brothers Leon (Alan Tilvern) and James Karadia (David Joss Buckley), who run a local carpet factory. He tracks them down at their office when he finds out that they have recently sold some carpets to Harry. As the new year approaches, Ken decides to track the arsonist down before the next attack, which has been touted to be at the new hotel that Harry is about to purchase. Last appearance of Rachel Davies as Doreen Evans, Gordon Warnecke as Hanif Kurtha and Joan Scott as Ethel Allard.

=== Series 2 (1987) ===
Several months have now passed and Harry has gone up in the world, having purchased a larger, swankier hotel, the Coaching Inn, within the affluent town of Edgbaston. Since Ken helped with the sale of the hotel, he repays him by offering him lodgings in a room above the former stable buildings. Ken turns the stables into a base for a new courier firm, Texas Rangers. This series sees new employees Rocky Cassidy and Debbie Yates join the firm. Rocky is initially employed as a courier but he later becomes a helpful sidekick and associate to Ken as he assists him with his investigations. During the ensuing episodes, Ken and Rocky are involved in wide range of situations whilst out delivering packages, from clashing with unscrupulous property developers to unwittingly assisting credit card smugglers and uncovering smuggling rings. Harry also has his share of issues to deal with as he tries to run the hotel, including experiencing a police raid after a pornographic film unit utilizes his premises, reported incidents of food poisoning among some guests, mislaying a large cache of money and a theft at an Irish gypsy wedding. This series was filmed entirely on location, and unlike the previous series it was shot completely on film, a production practice that would also be carried over into the following series as well. Uniquely, this was also the only series split into two half series aired over two transmission blocks, whereas all the other series were shown in complete 13-week runs.

No.	Title	Directed by	Written by	Original release date
1	"Texas Rangers"	Christopher King	Guy Meredith	17 February 1987
Harry has sold the Grand Hotel and moved to a larger, more prestigious premises, the Coaching Inn, located in Edgbaston. Meanwhile, Ken has a new courier firm operating out of the hotel's stables called Texas Rangers. But he discovers too late that the two-way radio set-up he has purchased is already owned by rival firm Romany Riders, which is run by Lomas (Stephen Grief) and his son Mickey (Richard Graham), who also run a protection racket. Mickey and his gang of Hells Angels corner and intimidate Ken over the radios and demand he pays Lomas a cut out of his profits. Ken refuses, but the gang sabotage his motorcycle's brakes, causing him to crash. Rocky Cassidy, another biker who also works at Romany Riders, witnesses the episode and confronts Lomas over the violation of the Biker's Code, and then tries to contact Ken, who retaliates on Lomas by drenching his offices with water. Meanwhile, the launch of Harry's hotel lurches from one setback to another as Emelyn Price-Jones (Ronald Lacey), a Welsh MP staying at the hotel, first accosts chambermaid Debbie Yates whilst she is cleaning his room; Debbie quits to join Ken's business instead as a dispatcher. Price-Jones then almost ruins the opening ceremony with his drunken speech, and then the local newspaper reporter fails to show up. Ken is sent to urgently deliver publicity photos to the newspaper office, but on the way is ambushed by Mickey's gang bent on revenge. Rocky switches sides and helps him escape, and the gang are apprehended by the police. Rocky delivers the photos to the newspaper, with Ken giving him a job at Texas Rangers. First appearance of Neil Morrissey as Rocky Cassidy, Lesley-Anne Sharpe as Debbie Yates and Teddie Thompson as Linda.
2	"Special Delivery"	Bren Simson	Paul Wheeler	24 February 1987
James Petheridge (Simon Rouse), a local councilor, is staying at the hotel; Harry wants him to put a good word for the upcoming planning meeting. Ken unwittingly delivers a package of pornographic books to Petheridge, and when Texas Rangers is implicated by the police for delivering the package, Ken tries to clear his name in order to restore the reputation of his firm. To add to his woes, TV journalist Linda West (Diane Keen) is on the pursuit and is determined to prove that Petheridge is corrupt, which prompts Ken to seek out the source of the pornographic books in order to stitch up West on her own show. Concurrently, Rocky is settling in to his new role working for Ken at Texas Rangers, although he starts to tire from having to regularly deliver packages to the vivacious Mrs Sefton (Christina Greatrex), who starts lusting after him.
3	"Day of the Yokel"	Alex Kirby	Douglas Watkinson	3 March 1987
An elderly farmer, Irene Maplethorpe (Phylis Calvert), who runs Moat Farm, starts to get targeted when she finds dead sheep in the trough, escaped cattle in the fields and a flooded farmyard. Things come to a head when a JCB demolishes her barn. A local consortium of crooked property developers, Rathbone, Keen and Blackwater (RKB), are interested in forcing Maplethorpe to sell her land so they can build luxury flats onsite; it later turns out they were behind the attacks. RKB offer Harry the chance to invest in their firm. When out shooting with them on land near the farm, they meet Irene, who is irate about their presence, and Harry discovers the extent of the situation. He soon presses Ken to delve into RKB's unscrupulous tactics against Irene and prevent them from forcing Irene to sell her farm. First appearance of Denzil Pugh as Stanley.
4	"Smokey and the Band"	Robert Tronson	Jim Hill	10 March 1987
Harry hires to a country music band, Broncho Billy's Boys, to provide entertainment at the hotel. Ken falls for lead singer Bebe McLintock (Fiona Hendley) after he rescues the band when they break down en route to the hotel. He soon discovers she is in a dispute with her agent Frankie Bass (Tricia George) over the share of the takings; Frankie is preventing Bebe from singing her own material during the gigs. Things soon come to a head and Bebe leaves the band, so Ken tries to resolve the situation, only for things to worsen when Ken finds out that a member of the band has stolen his beloved motorbike 'White Lightning' and sold it to a dishonest bike dealer, Arch Clanton (Dudley Sutton).
5	"Taken For a Ride"	Robert Tronson	Jim Fletcher	17 March 1987
Albion Firetrucks, a local company that produces fire engines, employs Ken to courier the plans for their new prototype vehicle. When he is knocked off his bike whilst delivering the plans, he is rescued by Shandy Tremblett (Camille Coduri), a page 3 model who is currently staying at the Coaching Inn. Ken delves into the matter when the prototype is stolen and uncovers a shady deal between an American consortium run by Ed Slattely (John Alderson) and Albion's current director Sir Frederick Blackton MP (Malcolm Medwin) to buy out the company at a knockdown price, then assist strip the business before closing it down. Ken decides to track down the prototype to discredit and disrupt Slattely and Blackton's plans.
6	"Wheels of Fortune"	Geoff Husson	Anthony Horowitz	24 March 1987
Rocky has his bike stolen whilst he is out collecting a package from an office in the city centre. Meanwhile, Harry has left Ken to manage the hotel when he has to assist his elderly aunt Lill when she is taken to hospital after suffering a stroke. Later, Ken meets Phyliss Nicholls (Sheila Allen), a clairvoyant who is currently staying at the hotel; during a reading, she warns Ken not to ride his motorbike, as she foresees a terrible crash with lots of blood that finds Ken ending up on an operating table. Ken is skeptical about this and is determined to prove her theories wrong despite his misgivings about his potential fate. First appearance of Barbara Durkin as Glynis.
7	"A Ride on the Wild Side"	Moira Armstrong	Billy Hamon	31 March 1987
When Ken makes a delivery to a house, he finds that it is being used as a studio for pornographic films. The film director Barry Drinkwater (Peter Blake) soon discovers Ken's association with the Coaching Inn, and he negotiates with Harry to make a film there but purposely withholds his true intentions. Concurrently, Debbie's younger sister Lindy (Tricia Penrose) arrives at the hotel, having left the family home in Liverpool. Debbie tries to persuade her to return home, but she refuses. Soon Harry gives her a part-time job running the bar, and Drinkwater meets her there one evening and entices her away in return for a part in his upcoming film. Shortly after, Ken and Debbie track Lindy down at a flat above a sex shop, and Ken is arrested by DS Margaret Daly of the Vice Squad for possessing 'complementary goods' given to him by the shop's assistant. He proves his innocence and finds out that Daly has been trying to implicate Drinkwater for his misdemeanors. They decided to work together and plan to entrap Drinkwater, utilizing Margaret's teenage daughter Jo as a decoy. First appearance of Amanda Burton as Margaret Daly, Emma Davies as Jo Daly and James Leslau as Hopalong.
8	"Credit Where It's Due"	Alex Kirby	Roy Mitchell	27 October 1987
Ken and Rocky are out delivering packages to a pair of Irish farmers, Norman (Killian McKenna) and Barry (Peter Caffey). These packages contain chemicals, and Rocky strongly suspects that the pair may be IRA terrorists due to a recent spate of bombings in Birmingham. He calls the bomb squad out to blow up one of the containers and they discover that they contain fake credit cards. Meanwhile, Harry commissions artist Davinda Duff (Pamela Salem) to paint a portrait of the hotel; whilst taking her out to dinner one evening, she forges his card whilst borrowing it. Ken and Harry later make the connection that she is linked to the credit card forgers back at the farm. Concurrently, Debbie falls in love with the hotel's new French chef Maurice (Jeff Rawle), but when the police arrest him, his identity isn't what it seems.
9	"Trudy's Grit"	Sarah Hellings	Matthew Bardsley	3 November 1987
Suspicions are raised when a new courier is employed at Texas Rangers. Trudy (Kirsten Hughes), an attractive blonde biker, joins the firm and soon Rocky falls for her. However, Ken soon finds out that Trudy is the daughter of Lord Allderly (Llewellyn Rees), who is now badly in debt after he failed to receive royalties for the motorbikes he designed for Lawsons, a motorbike manufacturer. Later, Trudy plans to poison a pair of representatives from the building society who happen to be in the process of repossessing her father's house. Coincidentally, the pair happen to be staying at the hotel, and soon Harry finds the hotel investigated by Environmental Health Officers when suspected incidents of food poisoning are reported. Rocky and Trudy take the law into their own hands and kidnap the owner of the company, Matthew Lawson (David Mallison), in an attempt to pay off Lord Allderly's debts.
10	"A Fistful of Pesetas"	Baz Taylor	Gerald G. Moore	10 November 1987
Harry receives an unwelcome visitor from his past when his ex-wife Alison (Georgina Hale) comes to stay at the hotel. She brings along her Spanish boyfriend, Luis Perez (Tony Slattery), who turns out to owe money to an unscrupulous wine dealer, Teddy Rawlingston (Christopher Benjamin). After Alison mislays the holdall that contained the money Luis was to pay Rawlingston, Harry offers to pay the debt, only for complications to manifest when he discovers that Alison has been kidnapped by Rawlingston's men. Meanwhile, Ken and Rocky are out delivering a large statue to a university lecturer and strongly suspect that the statues may contain drugs. They investigate further and discover that the statues have been used as part of an elaborate smuggling operation. Last appearance of Denzil Pugh as Stanley.
11	"Paper Mafia"	Ken Hannam	Tony McHale	17 November 1987
Rocky finds himself embroiled in the middle of a vicious ongoing spat between two rival Italian restaurants when he is employed to deliver pizzas for one of the businesses involved. To complicated matters further, he also falls in love with Guiseppina (Georgina Slowe), the daughter of his employer Giovanni (John Bennett). At the hotel, Harry is planning on going to a conference in the USA and has a spare ticket to sell. He eventually manages to sell it to guests Wyman (Constantine Gregory) and Franklyn (David Simeon), who are staying at the hotel. However, he soon suspects foul play when they get Ken to run various errands for them, and makes a shocking discovery about Wyman.
12	"Fiddler Under the Roof"	Sarah Hellings	Douglas Watkinson	24 November 1987
An Irish gypsy wedding is taking place at the hotel, but Harry is distraught when he finds the guests turning up in caravans and tents, parking on the hotel's lawn. To make matters worse, tempers flare when the bride's father, James McGillivray (James Ellis), discovers that the groom, Sean Jones (Shaun Scott), is actually a police sergeant. Later on, the wedding presents are stolen and the police arrest the bride's two brothers Rory (Joe McGann) and Kevin (Stephen McGann) for committing the theft. Ken investigates further in order to prove their innocence and find out the real culprit, who has been lurking around the hotel.
13	"A Once Fluid Man"	Ken Hannam	Billy Hamon	1 December 1987
Ken is reunited with Margaret Daly at an aerobics class, whilst Harry is despondent with the way his life is going and is currently in the process of selling the Coaching Inn; Ken is furious with him, as this would lead to the loss of his business along with his home. Later on, a former colleague from the fire brigade, Terry Brent (Anthony May), comes to stay at the hotel. He claims to be a successful manager of a pop group, but when Rocky delivers a package to the group's lead singer, they inform him that they have never heard of Brent. They begin to doubt Terry's mental health, and when he admits the truth, he holds Ken and Harry hostage at gunpoint in one of the hotel rooms. Last appearance of Lesley-Anne Sharpe as Debbie Yates and James Leslau as Hopalong.

=== Series 3 (1988–1989) ===
Harry has now sold the Coaching Inn and has brought the Plaza Suite, a ballroom in Edgbaston. Meanwhile, Ken has returned to work at Texas Rangers following a long convalescence and is running his business from an office at the Plaza Suite. Later, whilst Ken is on the lookout for Richard Jay, a businessman who has robbed the proceeds from a charity event he was organizing with Harry, he is reunited with Margaret, who left the police force due to disciplinary action following the hostage situation at the end of the previous series. She is now trying to run a private investigation agency from home whilst trying to manage her rebellious teenage daughter Jo. After Ken helps Margaret solve one of her investigations, she praises his skills as a private detective and they decide to go into partnership together in the form of Boon-Daly Investigations (BDI), otherwise known as Beady Eye. Through their investigations they investigate and track down various suspects, including ex-husbands accused of cheating on alimony payments, a former spy being hounded by the press, a runaway former rock star supposedly accused of assault, a career criminal duping them into providing a false alibi whilst a robbery is taking place and an egg smuggling gang who are targeting a rare sheep farmer. This was the third and final series to be filmed in Birmingham before Central moved production to their new studios in Nottingham. As with the previous series, filming was done on entirely on location. This was the last series to be shot exclusively on film; the production of the show would switch entirely to videotape from the following series onwards.

No.	Title	Directed by	Written by	Original release date
1	"Charity Begins at Home (Part One)"	Baz Taylor	Tony McHale	1 November 1988
Several months have passed since the hostage incident, and Harry has since sold the hotel and purchased a ballroom called the Plaza Suite; he has taken Linda and Glynis with him to assist with the management of the venue. Harry's first customer is Richard Jay (Hywel Bennett), who wants to organize a charity event that will be compèred by a celebrity guest, Matthew Kelly (as himself). After the event takes place, Jay does a runner with the money and Harry is left to face the press, where he announces that he will reimburse the money in full. Meanwhile, Ken returns to Texas Rangers after a long absence and finds out that Debbie has absconded the firm to get married. Ken meets Margaret Daly again; she has since left the police force and set up her own private investigation agency. Later, Ken and Rocky are accused of industrial espionage by an advertising agency. Since the reputation of Texas Rangers is being blacklisted, Ken is keen to find out who's behind all this.
2	"Charity Begins at Home (Part Two)"	Baz Taylor	Tony McHale	8 November 1988
Following on from the events of the previous episode, the future for Harry's and Ken's businesses now hangs in the balance. After all the bad publicity Harry has endured, he finds the Plaza Suite inundated with homeless people who would have benefited from the charity, and they will not depart until the money from the charity event has been reimbursed. Ken and Margaret manage to track down and corner Richard Jay, now living at a fairground with his mother (Maria Charles), who runs one of the stalls. They discover that his real name is Dick Jowett and he has already spent and gambled most of the money away. Later, Ken and Rocky get involved in a blackmail case when Jonathan Hilary (Oliver Tobias), Margaret's client, claims he's being blackmailed over photos of his wife and her lover. Margaret praises Ken's skills as a private investigator, and they decide to go into partnership under the name of Boon-Daly Investigations (BDI), or Beady Eye for short.
3	"Topspin"	Baz Taylor	Kieran Prendiville	15 November 1988
Ken and Margaret are hired by Keith Filkin (Anthony Calf), an investigative reporter, to act as minders for Dorothy North (Paula Wilcox), a spy who has just been released from prison after being prosecuted for passing on state secrets in 1973. Filkin is keen to protect his profitable news scoop, and when rival newspapers hear about her release, journalists besiege the Plaza Suite, leaving them trapped. Dorothy wants to terminate her contract with Filkin, who threatens to return her to prison if she does so. With the secret service now in pursuit, Ken and Margaret must work out a way to turn her in to MI5. Concurrently, Harry has a problem on his hands when he tries to work out the catering for a Greek wedding reception that is scheduled to take place at the Plaza Suite.
4	"Have a Nice Day"	Alex Kirby	Jim Hawkins	22 November 1988
Anita Wilberforce (Sharon Duce), a video store owner, approaches Ken and Margaret to help track down her husband Ray, who has done a runner and withdrawn all savings from their joint bank and building society accounts. They encounter his business partner Alan Chambers (Denis Lill), who suspects that Ray may be committing fraud due to some unrecorded transactions. Meanwhile, back at the Plaza Suite, Harry is preparing for a new lighting system to be put in place for an upcoming promotional event organized by Ross Townsend (Nick Tate) from the Australian tourist board. Harry employs electricians John (Angus Barnett) and Roger (Tyler Butterworth) to install the new system. They manage to blow out the fuse, which ends up electrocuting Roger. Harry is able to save his life due to first-aid training he did during his time as a fireman; however, this incident leaves the venue without electricity.
5	"Beef Encounter"	Sarah Hellings	Harry Duffin	29 November 1988
Corrupt businessman Eddie Allen (Nick Dickson), an entrepreneur who runs the Fast Eddie franchise of fast food restaurants, is well known for exploiting his staff. When the staff go on strike, he contacts Margaret and Ken to find out the identity of the agitator who has organized the picketing. They discover that their leader is elderly widow Barbara Drake (Muriel Pavlow), whose husband was killed in an industrial accident at a waste disposal plant Allen managed at the time. She soon gets her revenge by poisoning the food supply, causing an epidemic of food poisoning that threatens to close down Allen's entire franchise. Concurrently, Harry is reunited with Yvonne Temple (Anne Reid) a former girlfriend he proposed to many years before. She is currently in a strained marriage with her bullying husband Brian (Bernard Brown), and Harry tries his best to split them up.
6	"Never Say Trevor Again"	Alex Kirby	Douglas Watkinson	6 December 1988
Ken attempts to track down and serve a writ to a dodgy businessman, Charles Henry Marquis (Zoot Money); however, his attempts are far from successful, as he manages to evade Ken at every opportunity. Meanwhile, Margaret is installing security for Don Pettifer (Hugh Paddick), a gangster who has had many dealings with Margaret during her time in the police. She is alerted when one of the gardeners Trevor (Mark Haddigan) states that his colleague Ray (John Pythian) has disappeared after witnessing Pettifer passing on huge bundles of cash to some fellow criminals during a meeting at his house. The police, who have been staking out Pettifer's house for several months, appeal to Margaret and Ken for assistance. Margaret plants a bug in his house but is caught on camera by Pettifer's security. Meanwhile, at the Plaza, Harry is approached by Jim Hargreaves (John Taylor), a former colleague from the fire brigade who wants to organize a fundraising event for the League of Absent Friends (LOAF). Harry agrees to his plans; however, unbeknownst to him, Hargreaves wants to use the Plaza to stage an illegal boxing match. First appearance of Jamie Roberts as DC Archie Pelham.
7	"Honourable Service"	Sarah Hellings	Richard LeParmentier, Paddy Fletcher	13 December 1988
Margaret and Jo are away one holiday, which leaves Ken to manage the business on his own. One night, he attends the retirement party of Ron Blisset (Brian Peck), a former colleague from the fire brigade. At the party, he is approached by his wife Maureen (Patricia Mort), who appeals to him to investigate her son Pete (Lloyd Owen), who also happens to be a fireman like his father. He recently resigned from the fire service after his colleague Mack (Geoffrey Church) was badly injured in a fire. Ken is tasked to track him down and discovers that his former co-worker Paul (Gary Webster) was behind the fire and moonlights as an arsonist for a crooked developer. Meanwhile at the Plaza Suite, Harry finds himself involved in a self-assertiveness class organized by Denise Appleby (Elizabeth Counsell). He passes the class with flying colours with the interviewer during a role-playing demonstration and decides to take Denise out on a date.
8	"The Devil You Know"	Bruce MacDonald	Matthew Bardsley	20 December 1988
Ken and Margaret are employed to follow Ronnie Harris (Paul Freeman) when his wife suspects he is having an affair with another woman. They follow Harris and his mistress to a boating lake, and Ken takes some incriminating photographs of the pair together. Meanwhile, a robbery is taking place nearby, and the prime suspect happens to be Ronnie Harris. Unbeknownst to them, Ken and Margaret have managed to provide Harris with a convincing alibi and find themselves under suspicion by the police. They are interrogated by detectives Joyman (John Benfield) and Pelham about their involvement in the case. Later on, the BDI office is broken into; however, only Ken's photos of Margaret have been taken, which throws further suspicion on the case. Concurrently, Harry is away for the weekend with a friend, Roger Evans (Albert Welling), at a hotel owned by restaurant critic Gerald Neale (John Savident). Evans is put into an awkward situation, since it was Neale who had put his former restaurant La Carmargue out of business after a series of scathing reviews. A whodunit murder mystery event is taking place at the hotel, organized by an officious woman named Rose (Jean Alexander) who keeps probing the place for clues, although her identity isn't what it seems.
9	"Peacemaker"	Bren Simson	Diane Culverhouse, Julian Spilsbury	27 December 1988
Following a violent argument with his wife, yobbish rock star Bograt (Robin Askwith) disappears. Margaret is hired by his agent, Lenny Bright (Karl Howman), to track down his whereabouts, since his band The Necros is shortly scheduled to perform a comeback gig. Rocky, an avid fan of the band, eagerly volunteers to assist Margaret with her investigation. Meanwhile, Ken has been employed by Elaine Blanche (Tessa Wyatt) to follow her ex-husband Derek (Terence Hillyer) when he is suspected of cheating on alimony payments. But when Harry goes to a jewelry shop to repair a bracelet, he discovers that Elaine is having a secret relationship with one of the jewellers. This presents Ken with a huge dilemma that puts him at odds with Margaret: whether to confirm her husband's cheating to Elaine or inform Derek about his ex-wife's relationship, which would look like he is acting against his client.
10	"Banbury Blue"	Geoff Husson	Ewart Alexander	3 January 1989
Cumbrian sheep farmer Lambert Sampson (Brian Blessed) wants to find out who has been stealing away his Banbury Blue sheep, so he hires Margaret to investigate. Rocky volunteers to assist Margaret when he goes on night watch duty, but he ends up getting kidnapped by couple Tabitha (Tabitha Blackburn) and Winson Hammond (Joseph Mydell) who happen to be watching the farm. Rocky discovers that they have been utilizing rounds of Banbury Blue cheese to smuggle rare bird eggs. Meanwhile, at the Plaza, Harry has organized a tea dance for the senior citizens; later on, he finds himself being pestered with love letters from an anonymous admirer, and he gets Ken to investigate the identity of the person behind the letters. Last appearance of Barbara Durkin as Glynis.
11	"One Reborn Every Minute"	Laurence Moody	Kieran Prendiville	10 January 1989
An American evangelical preacher, Rev. Jebediah Marshall (Kristoffer Tabori), hires Ken and Margaret to investigate the people who have been sabotaging his evangelical meetings at the Plaza Suite, when he frequently finds himself beset by hecklers and a strippergram. He admits that he and a fellow preacher are competing for a slot on a cable TV channel and he is concerned that he is the victim of a dirty tricks campaign. Margaret and Ken chase up on a number of leads who deny their involvement with the pranks, whilst Rocky goes after the strippergram, Helen (Kelly Hunter), to find out about her involvement. Meanwhile, Harry volunteers his Aunt Delia (Joan Hickson), who suffers from severe arthritis, to attend one of Marshall's meetings. She is supposedly cured by Marshall, who prays for recovery, but is left suffering from the effects a few days later.
12	"The Fall and Rise of the Bowman Empire"	Bruce MacDonald	Douglas Watkinson	17 January 1989
Ken is hired by local shop owner Elspeth Bowman (Patricia Hayes) to ensure her son Cecil (Richard O'Callaghan) keeps out of trouble after he is released from prison. However, his two old friends Arthur Mitchell (Michael Attwell) and David Kelloway (Berwick Kaler) are organizing a welcome home party for him at the Plaza Suite. It turns out that Mitchell and Kelloway were prime suspects for a robbery that incriminated Cecil in the first place, and they are now looking for him to assist them with their latest heist at Stansfield Hall. Meanwhile, Rocky's powers of observation are put to the test when Margaret and Jo train him to remember forty objects on a tray, whilst Harry finds the Plaza Suite plagued with mice and has to close the venue for deep cleaning. Last appearance of Jamie Roberts as DC Archie Pelham.
13	"The Not So Lone Ranger"	Laurence Moody	Douglas Watkinson	24 January 1989
Ken and Margaret are contacted by Johnson (John Burgess), a council officer, to investigate "H. Angel," the creator of a series of graffiti murals around town. Rocky assists with the investigation, and after some enquiries with local bikers, he tracks H. Angel down; she is an alluring graffiti artist whom he soon falls for. Meanwhile, Jo is doing some work experience at a racing stables, and she finds that one of the jockeys, Gerry Hannigan (Billy Clarke), seems to be under a lot of strain. She alerts Ken and Margaret, who later interview his wife Charlotte (Caroline Langrishe). She informs them that the owner of the horse she is training, Sellaby (Mark Kingston), is demanding that Gerry should lose his next race. Later, when he refuses to agree to his demands, Charlotte is kidnapped, and he soon gives into his demands. Just as the race is about to begin, Margaret and Ken desperately search through the stables in order to find Charlotte as a means of incriminating Sellaby for his crimes. Over at the Plaza Suite, Harry is beset with chaos at a Trivia Pursuit championship that is being held; tempers rage after the contestants accuse each other of cheating. Last appearance of Amanda Burton as Margaret Daly, Emma Davies as Jo Daly and Teddie Thompson as Linda.

=== Series 4 (1989) ===
Following Margaret and Jo's departure for the US, Ken dissolves their partnership and moves to Nottingham to start up a new detective agency, Boon Investigations, located in a small office down the road from Nottingham Castle. Since he is working alone, Ken often struggles with his workload. His cases include tracking down an army deserter who has got involved in illegal boxing, acting as minder for a wayward local radio DJ who has a tendency for booze, investigating a meatpacking factory that doubles as a smuggling front, uncovering an insurance scam involving a sterile racing horse whose medical certificate was forged, and bringing to justice a crooked casino owner who uses dodgy business practices including blackmail and subterfuge to put a rival gambling club out of business. He is assisted in his investigations by Laura Marsh, his secretary and personal assistant, who joins his firm at the beginning of the series; she proves to be a valuable aide with her skills in deduction and uncovering evidence, which help further Ken's investigations. Meanwhile, Harry has sold the Plaza Suite and has also moved from Birmingham. He goes into partnership with widow Helen Yeldman to manage Woodcote Park, a hotel and country club situated within the Nottinghamshire countryside. He has grandiose plans to turn it into a renowned venue for sporting tournaments, including polo, tennis and golf, along with hosting themed evenings, stand-up comedy nights and organizing meetings for various clubs and organisations. Rocky later joins them after returning from Birmingham when Texas Rangers goes into liquidation; he occasionally assists Ken and Laura with their inquiries and also does odd jobs around Woodcote Park. Production of the show had now moved to Central's new studio facilities at Lenton Lane in Nottingham, which facilitated a change of location for this series. Like the previous two series, it was filmed entirely on location; however, from this series onwards, it was shot completely on videotape as a means of cutting down on production costs. Moreover, the title sequences continued to be shot on film; this practice would continue up until the end of Series 6.

No.	Title	Directed by	Written by	Original release date
1	"Walking Off Air"	Frank W. Smith	Guy Meredith	2 October 1989
Margaret and Jo have emigrated to the USA, thus spelling the end for BDI. Now going it alone, Ken has moved to Nottingham, where he sets up his own detective agency, Boon Investigations, operating from a small office near the city centre. Meanwhile, Harry has sold the Plaza Suite and has gone into partnership with widow Helen Yeldman; they jointly run Woodcote Park, a hotel and country club in the Nottinghamshire countryside. Ken's first assignment is to act as a minder to Eddie Cotton (Dexter Fletcher), an unruly radio DJ who has a habit of turning up at work drunk. Later on, Cotton has his drink spiked at a nightclub, misses his show, and is promptly fired by the managing director, Bill Stone (Gareth Thomas). Ken suspects foul play is afoot, since Cotton was drugged, and investigates further to prove that Cotton's dismissal was all part of a cover-up. He seeks the help of Laura Marsh, the station's receptionist, to allow him into the building and assist him with his investigations. She is later sacked for her actions, and Ken offers her a job at his firm as his secretary and personal assistant. First appearance of Elizabeth Carling as Laura Marsh and Brigit Forsyth as Helen Yeldman.
2	"Of Meissen Men"	Graeme Harper	Kieran Prendiville	9 October 1989
One morning, Ken is approached by Marion Kershaw (Wanda Ventham) to track down her missing husband Geoff (Alfred Lynch), who runs an export/import business. Ken discovers that Geoff owes money to the taxman and later finds out from the police that he is wanted for antique smuggling due to a spate of robberies at various country houses in the area. Ken and Harry decide to stage their own fake robbery at Woodcote Park in order to attract the smugglers when they target the building. Later that night, they find that the man they manage to apprehend happens to be Eric Beveridge (Peter Kelly), an antiques dealer who had recently sold some chairs to Helen and is an associate to Geoff. The pair use Beveridge to help track down Kershaw's whereabouts.
3	"The Relief of Matty King"	Christopher Taylor	Douglas Watkinson	16 October 1989
Matty King (Tim Healy) is a washed-out comedian who is currently staying at Woodcote Park whilst doing some shows in Nottingham. One evening, whilst doing a gig at the hotel, he collapses from nervous exhaustion and is rushed to hospital. Later, he confesses that he owes some gambling debts to a pair of crooked businessmen, Rupert Cole (Murray Head) and Tony Lawrence (Phillip Rowlands). Meanwhile, Ken is assigned to investigate by Dick Vaughan (Clive Graham), who runs the Carrington Club, after he gets his gaming licence postponed because a punter has made allegations of cheating. He delves into the investigation by spending an evening at the club and discovers that one of the blackjack croupiers, Jackie (Pippa Guard), is cheating. She admits that Cole is behind this: he has coerced her into cheating in order to get the gaming licence for the Carrington Club revoked in return for keeping quiet about her past criminal record for shoplifting. It is also discovered that Cole was the mystery punter who reported the allegations and also happens to run a gambling club. Ken decides to stitch Cole up and get concrete evidence about his corrupt dealings.
4	"Vallance's Liberty"	Frank W. Smith	Douglas Watkinson	23 October 1989
A middle-aged couple, Terry (David Horovitch) and Gill Conroy (Caroline Nimmons), find their car breaking down outside a house owned by George (Reginald Marsh) and Irene Boxall (Rowena Cooper). Whilst waiting for the breakdown van to arrive, they invite the Boxalls to a Tyrolean night currently taking place at Woodcote Park. A few hours later at the hotel, the Boxalls become suspicious when the Conroys fail to turn up, and they ask Ken for some assistance. He finds out that the invitation was simply a ruse to get the Boxalls out of their house so that the Conroys and their associate Tom Vallance (Brian Gwaspari), a bank robber who was recently released from prison, can break in and recover plans Vallance left when he owned the same residence a few years back. Concurrently, at the hotel, Helen is confronted by Meryl Spicer (Kate Hardie), who claims to be her daughter whom she gave up for adoption when she was a baby. At Ken's office, Laura is met by a familiar visitor when Rocky returns; he later confides in Ken that he has become destitute. Taking pity on him, he persuades Helen to hire Rocky to do some odd jobs around Woodcote Park.
5	"Do Not Forsake Me"	Christopher Baker	Nick Whitby	30 October 1989
Nightclub owner Roy Messener (David Calder) hires Ken to act as his bodyguard and chauffeur, along with assisting his hasty departure for Cyprus. Ken becomes suspicious about Messner's motives when his dogs are shot and his car gets crushed. Messener claims that Sammy Robinson (Anthony Valentine), a former colleague of his, is responsible for the killings, since he blamed Messener for sending him to prison for manslaughter after causing the death of a rival nightclub owner whom Messener ordered Robinson to beat up. It later turns out that Sammy's brothers Geoff (Gary Olsen) and Curly (Stephen Marcus) were behind the attacks and plan on disposing of Messener as well. Meanwhile, Harry has his own share of problems when an environmental problem besets the hotel due to leaking drums of pesticide left out by his crotchety farmer neighbor Mr Ditton (David Ellison).
6	"Arms and the Dog"	Brian Lighthill	Jane Hollowood	6 November 1989
Harry and Rocky are looking after Tinkerbell, a champion greyhound, ahead of her upcoming race. The dog's owner, Mr Hancock (Roger Booth), demands that Tinkerbell must only consume Mr Marrow dog food even though the dog loathes it. One afternoon, a mysterious young woman delivers some crates of wine to the hotel; whilst Harry and Rocky assist with the unloading, she kidnaps the dog. Harry and Rocky decide to track down the dog and find out more about the dog thieves' motives. Meanwhile, Ken is employed by Charlie Fowlkes (Joseph Marcell) to locate his son Ben (Nicholas Monu), who has gone missing after Charlie refused to lend him money to get him out of the army. Ken later discovers that Ben has deserted the army and is now working as a boxer, currently preparing for an illegal boxing match that his trainer Peter Mortan (Bill Paterson) is organizing, so that he can buy himself out of the army from his winnings. After Harry overhears that Ben's opponent Valdez (John Conteh) has had his licence revoked for a blood clot on the brain, Ken tries to stop the fight. First appearance of Benny Young as DS Ted Hatchard.
7	"Sickness and Health"	John Woods	Peter Mann	13 November 1989
Helen gives shelter to her old friend Judy Shelley (Susan Jameson), who arrives at Woodcote Park with her two unruly sons, Lee (Alexander Thornley) and Simon (James Tomlinson). Judy claims she has been frequently beaten and abused by her husband Peter (Michael J. Shannon) and is now seeking an injunction against him. Rocky gets suspicious when he spots a man named Patterson (Hugh Ross) lurking around the grounds and deduces that he has been employed by Peter to track down the whereabouts of his wife and kids. He relays this to Ken, who investigates the man further. Peter contacts Ken and claims that Judy is mentally ill and that she and Patterson are plotting to kidnap his sons. Meanwhile, Ken is employed to investigate a series of thefts taking place at a nursing home; due to his workload, he passes his case onto Harry, who goes in undercover as a patient, assisted by Laura, posing as his spoiled daughter.
8	"In It for the Monet"	Graeme Harper	Paddy Fletcher, Richard Le Parmentier	20 November 1989
Ken is approached by the parents of university student Isobel Sheridan (Clare Holman) to investigate why she has suddenly become wealthy. He assigns Rocky and Laura to pose as students and trail her around campus to find out more about her dealings. They suspect that she has been involved in drug dealing when they track her down at a hotel and see her handing money to a man, but Ken manages to deduce that she has a more mundane source of income: she confesses that she has been writing and selling her essays to other students with the assistance of her lecturer Dr Michael Harrison (Patrick Malahide), although Ken increasingly becomes suspicious about Harrison's involvement in the scheme. Meanwhile, Ken and Harry find themselves embroiled in a family feud between brothers Andrew (Thomas Wheatley) and Graham Parker (Ian McNeice), who are sparring over the ownership of a classic car they inherited from their late father.
9	"Love Letters From a Dead Man"	Brian Lighthill	Alan Clews	27 November 1989
A widow, Barbara Lake (Sheila Gish), hires Ken to investigate after receiving a series of letters supposedly from her late husband Ronnie, a bank robber who died in a plane crash six months before. The letters allude to a large cache of money, but she suspects that someone is watching her. Her suspicions are promoted further when she receives a parcel containing a stash of money and a note reading that he wants her to meet at their special place, at a hotel room marked 324. Back at the office, Laura moans at Ken for not giving her any interesting assignments; she is more than happy when assigned by Charlie Cochrane (Valentine Pelka) to investigate his family history. However, Cochrane's true intentions are not what they seem, and it turns out he has a connection with Barbara. Back at the hotel, Helen has to deal with her nephew Ian (Patrick Field) when he becomes a victim of a blackmail attempt by a manager of a rival cycle team, Greg Simpson (Michael Culver), who threatens to publish a letter about Ian's past involvement with race fixing unless he joins his team.
10	"Big Game Hunt"	John Woods	Andy De La Tour	4 December 1989
The Bisons, a secret society akin to the Freemasons, are holding a meeting at Woodcote Park; during the course of the evening, lots of alcohol is consumed. On the way home, one of the Bisons, Derek Donague (David Ryall), is stopped by the police and has his driving licence suspended. Later, Ken is contacted by Vincent Brack (Ewan Stewart) to follow his wife Nina (Frances Tomelty), whom he suspects is leading a double life. He follows her to a nightclub, where she changes into a skimpy dress and blonde wig; it turns out she works as a hostess and singer using the name Susie. Ken soon gets chatting to her, and she breaks down and confesses that she has been desperately unhappy with her life since her husband regularly beats her and also suspects that she has been having an affair. Ken discusses this with Harry, who informs him that Vincent is a member of the Bisons and also happens to be a Detective Sergeant serving in the vice squad. They also discover that during the meetings, Vincent has been getting his fellow members drunk, then tipping them off to the police so they can get arrested for drink driving. After Nina informs Ken about his other nefarious dealings, Ken and Harry decide to gather enough evidence against Vincent to get him dismissed from the force and convicted for his conduct.
11	"Don't Buy From Me Argentina"	Graeme Harper	Guy Meredith	11 December 1989
An Argentinian polo team are visiting Woodcote Park and use the grounds for practice. Helen soon falls for the team's captain, Raoul Gomez (Oliver Cotton). Later, a husband of one of the guests staying with the team, Aiden Curtis (Kenneth Cranham), asks Ken to follow his wife Merily (Sabina Franklyn) when he suspects she is having an affair. Ken soon finds out that Merily is actually involved in an insurance scam involving the local vet, David Rennett (Malcolm Stoddard), and a member of the polo team, Celestino de Silva (Benedict Blythe); she has managed to get Rennett to forge a medical certificate for her horse Deauville Dancer, stating it is in perfect health despite it actually being infertile, so she could sell it to De Silva to establish its value with the insurance company, which will pay out a large sum in the event of the mare's death. Meanwhile, Rocky's motorbike is being repaired, and he suffers the humiliation of riding around in a Honda 50 moped. He later collects a valuable painting for a cantankerous elderly client, Thomas Kilverton (Tony Steedman); on the way, he is knocked off his bike and the painting is stolen, and Rocky soon uncovers an alimony conspiracy between Kilverton and his ex-wife (Wendy Gifford).
12	"All in a Day's Pork"	Frank W. Smith	Jane Hollowood	18 December 1989
Ken goes undercover at Sanford Meats, a local meat packing factory, when he is hired by secretary Amelia Woods (Jane Lowe) to find out who has been stealing letters and dictaphone tapes from the office. Ken later uncovers a scheme organized by the owner Mr Sanford (Leslie Sands) and his son Trevor (Simon Chandler): they accept mysterious late-night deliveries from Amsterdam that do not go through the books. One night, Ken organizes a fake traffic accident with Rocky and Laura in order to hold up one of the lorries destined for the factory. During the pile-up, Ken steals one of the cargo boxes and takes it back to Woodcote Park. Upon opening the contents, they discover illicit goods. Meanwhile, Harry and Helen are invited to a jousting tournament and become embroiled in a real-life mix-up, a rivalry between the White Knight and the Black Night over a damsel who they are squabbling over. Later, Ken is introduced to Rebecca Patterson (Pamela Bellwood), a Texan woman who lives in a nearby cottage, when he mends her fuses after they blow out. They soon embark on a passionate affair.
13	"The Eyes of Texas"	Christopher Baker	Paddy Fletcher, Richard LeParmentier	20 December 1989
After spending the night at Rebecca's cottage, Ken arrives at the office, where a tearful Laura informs him that it has been vandalized by burglars. Meanwhile, Harry is planning on selling his co-ownership of Woodcote Park in order to take over Hugo's, a nightclub and disco, but he soon receives a frosty reception by his business rival Vic Carpenter (Andrew McCulloch), who also wants to purchase the club. Harry refuses to cower from intimidation, but is eventually put off from purchasing the venue when his accountant informs him that his finances are in trouble. Ken is seriously considering closing his business and moving to Texas with Rebecca; she later reveals that she has moved to England in order to finalize her divorce with her estranged husband Tom (Jeremy Nicholas). Ken offers to track Tom down, and later he manages to arrange a rendezvous with Tom at Sneiton Windmill late one night in order to get him to sign the divorce papers. Rebecca finds out about this and arrives on the scene unannounced; she brandishes a shotgun and a deadly showdown ensues. Last appearance of Brigit Forsyth as Helen Yeldman.

=== Series 5 (1990) ===
Series 5 begins with Harry trying to set up a security firm after selling Woodcote Park. Operating from an office situated nearby the River Trent, at first he struggles to raise capital. But his fortunes change when he is reunited with Ken, and they join up and form Crawford Boon Security (CBS), with Harry organizing security engagements and Ken managing private investigations. They run into a wide range of clients and situations, usually at the locations where they have been hired to arrange security, ranging from tracking down a missing pupil from a boarding school, investigating a case of rivalry between two building firms, helping two ballet dancers bring their unscrupulous agent and his accomplice to justice and uncovering a counterfeit forgery racket. Their company frequently gets into trouble, such as having their contract to guard a derelict church scrapped after a series of vandalism attacks. This often puts Ken at odds with Harry, disagreeing on the best approach to restore their company's reputation and unmask the real culprits behind the unscrupulous activities they get caught up in. From this series onwards, CBS becomes the main focus of Ken and Harry's business endeavors. Ken also lives near the offices, at first in a yacht by the canal basin, and later in a canal boat after the former was sunk by two heavies employed by a local crook. The canal boat remains his residence for the duration of this series.

No.	Title	Directed by	Written by	Original release date
1	"Trouble in the Fields"	Anthony Garner	Peter Barwood	25 September 1990
Harry has sold Woodcote Park and he has plans to set up a security firm operating from an office situated by a canal basin of the River Trent, although his plans are squandered when his bank manager, Mr Slatter (Kit Jackson), refuses to draw him a loan. Moreover, Ken has also changed premises, and now runs Boon Investigations from a cramped and dilapidated caravan. Ken is hired by an environmental group to investigate reports of water pollution and dead fish in a quarry near Dornford Hall. Whilst out on horseback, Ken is thrown off his horse when he is shot at by an air rifle. He is rescued by Irena Tadeusz (Valentina Yakunina), who resides at Dornford Hall. She tells him about her friend Brigadier Charles, who was badly beaten in a recent robbery. Ken finds out that there have been a series of robberies from country houses, and makes the link that the reports of pollution in the local quarry aren't the only dirty business going on in the area. Meanwhile, Laura has joined a band as a lead singer performing at The Drum, a local pub. She makes serious plans to leave Ken and start a new career in London as a professional singer. First appearance of Oliver Smith as Smudger.
2	"Tales From the Riverbank"	Christopher Baker	Nick Whitby	2 October 1990
Ken and Harry have now joined forces and jointly run Crawford Book Security (CBS), with Ken managing investigation duties and Harry working as a security consultant. Ken has ditched the old caravan and now lives in a yacht moored in the river near the office. Late one night, Ken wakes to the sound of heavy objects being thrown into the canal. After making some advertisements in the local press, Harry and Ken find themselves inundated with requests. Ken accepts one request: a woman named Mrs Walters (Ann Fairbank) wants him to meet her at a riverside pub, where she asks him to send a letter. Later, Ken finds himself being watched by two mysterious South African men parked near his yacht. They board it and threaten Ken, stating that the recipient of the letter, John Loxley (William Russell), is demanding the whereabouts of a boat. The pair later sink Ken's yacht and threaten him once more. Later, Ken and Harry find themselves under surveillance when a CID detective, DS Don Speed (David Dixon), who is working undercover in their firm, is caught snooping through their papers. Harry decides to get a hypnotherapist, Geoffrey Phillips (Dermot Crowley) to hypnotize Ken; Ken is able to recall vaguely seeing a canal boat across the water during the night of the incident, which somehow could be linked.
3	"Work, Rest & Play"	Gareth Davies	Guy Meredith	9 October 1990
After his yacht was sunken by Loxley's heavies, Ken is now living in a canal boat that he bought from a local owner. Later, Ken is hired by Willie Connolly (John Hannah), a Scottish footballer, to act as his minder after he finds himself being targeted by bookie Donny MacGregor (Joseph Brady) and his henchmen; MacGregor who is out for vengeance after Willie separated from his wife Moira (Julie Graham), who happens to be MacGregor's daughter. Ken discovers a web of deception that involves Willie's manager Bob Bennet (Donald Gee) and his new girlfriend Belinda (Rachel Fielding), who are plotting to defraud him over the sale of a house. Concurrently, Harry is hired to look after a pregnant Afghan hound, but when the puppies are born, their appearance isn't what it seems. First appearance of Aaron Shirley as Lennie.
4	"The Belles of St. Godwalds"	Robert Chetwyn	Bernard McKenna	16 October 1990
Girls' boarding school pupil Justina Bradley (Amelia Shankley) has been secretly going out late at night with Perry (Nick Reding), a builder who is currently involved in the construction of the school's new swimming pool. The next day, Ken and Harry are hired by the headmistress, Hester McCulloch (Shelagh McLeod), to provide security for an upcoming fashion show and charity gala taking place at the school. Shortly after their arrival, the school receives a bomb threat, which Hester shrugs off as the latest in a series of pranks. Ken and Harry decide to investigate further; their suspicions are aroused when Justina goes missing from school and Hester receives a plait of her hair in the post, along with a ransom demand and a map of the school, which suggests she has been kidnapped. Ken questions Justina's roommate Monica (Victoria Scarborough), who informs him that Justina was making cryptic comments about Perry's plans. She suspects that Justina and Perry may be fabricating the kidnap as a ruse to hide their real plans. Meanwhile, Harry intends to join the local branch of the Conservative Party; however, the chairman, Simon Bradleigh (David McCallum), informs him that the party takes a dim view on bachelors. Harry feels under pressure to find a wife, and Bradleigh introduces him to an 'exclusive' introductory bureau that could assist him in his endeavors.
5	"Rival Eyes"	Bill Hays	Tim Munro	23 October 1990
An Irish builder, Thomas O'Rouke (James Ellis), asks Ken to investigate a robbery at his office. O'Rouke suspects Brian Johnson (Danny McGrath), another builder, is behind all this; in retaliation, he destroys Brian's office with a JCB. Caitlin (Emmaline Weston), O'Rouke's daughter, is doubtful that Brian committed the crime and believes her elder sister Bernadette (Emer McCourt) was the real culprit, since she has been flashing large amounts of cash lately. Ken's investigation leads him to a derelict house where he finds Bernadette living with her boyfriend Shane (Gary Mavers) and her baby son. The truth he discovers is more unfortunate and concerns Bernadette's hatred for her father after he kicked her out of the house when discovering she was pregnant with Brian's baby. Meanwhile, Harry is moving to a new house and Rocky is lodging with him. They assist a young widow, Sylvia Clayborough (Diane Langton), when her fishmongering business gets targeted by vandals.
6	"Burning Ambition"	Brian Lighthill	Bernard Dempsey, Kevin McNally	30 October 1990
A young offender, Lorraine Simpson (Robin Weaver), is released from Borstal for committing arson. Later, Ken is hired by Fiona Harper to investigate her husband Dennis (Michael Thomas), whom she suspects is having affair. Fiona isn't what she seems, and is in fact Lorraine, who works at a chambermaid at the local hotel. Later on, Ken watches Dennis with his girlfriend, who is really his wife Sue (Julie Peasgood), and he helps Fiona break in. She fakes a burglary and, before leaving on a train, gives Ken one of her necklaces, which actually belongs to Sue. The police arrest Ken for burglary; he has been framed for a crime he did not commit. Just before he is to be charged, DS Hatchard, a friend of Ken's whom Harry has approached for assistance, intervenes and the charge is dropped. Ken discovers that Lorraine's vendetta against him is linked to an event in his past that led to her conviction. Back at the office, Harry is approached by an elderly man, Len Drumgold (Ronald Fraser), to rent some space in his warehouse for a collection of furs that need storing. Harry discovers that they are in fact rabbits destined for shipping to Belgium as Drumgold claims. Skeptical about this, Harry, Rocky and Laura decide to delve into where they are really headed for.
7	"Bully Boys"	Christopher Baker	Veronica Henry	6 November 1990
Ken and Harry are involved with a case of bullying when Beth Benson (Anna Cropper), a cleaner at a local pub The Drum, appeals for their help. She informs them that she and her husband Jack (Ewan Hooper) have been frequently tormented by their noisy neighbor Geraldine Watters (Lesley Dunlop), who often plays loud music and has a dangerous Alsatian dog that is always barking. They have been offered new accommodation, but Jack does not want to leave, as he is an avid gardener. Ken delves into the matter further; to his shock, he discovers a shocking web of deception involving their landlord Charlie Luce (Graham Stark) and his financial advisor James Marian (Denis Lawson), who uses unscrupulous tactics against his tenants whilst Luce is serving time in prison. Meanwhile, Laura is looking after Greg Willis (Gregory Chisholm), a ten-year-old son of one of Harry's friends who happen to be away on holiday. He is withdrawn and skipping school, and it is discovered that he has been bullied by his P.E. teacher Nick Fuller (John Salthouse). Laura and Rocky decide to get their own back on Fuller and arrange a rugby match where they encourage the other players to violently tackle and bully him.
8	"A Night at the Ballet"	Robert Chetwyn	Andy De La Tour	13 November 1990
CBS have been hired to organize and manage the security for a charity gala event at the Theatre Royal. During the course of the evening, they encounter far more than they expected. One of the ballet dancers, Jan Meltzer (Joanna Roth), informs Ken and Laura that she and her fellow dancer Peter Sorreno (Marcus D'Amico) are trying to escape from their agent Eckford (Harry Ditson) and his thuggish accomplice Kelp (Mac McDonald) whom he uses to keep Jan and Peter in line. It turns out that Eckford has been blackmailing Jan, who threatens to reveal to the press Peter's past offences for drugs if she does not cooperate with his demands. Ken helps the couple escape by using Rocky and Laura as decoys. With Eckford and Kelp now hot on their tail, the only person they can turn to for help is Jan's estranged uncle Tony Maquiotta (Ray Charleson). Meanwhile, Harry falls for the charms of Enrica Montanini (Eleanor Bron), an opera singer who attended the gala. First appearance of Tony Caunter as Bertie.
9	"Undercover"	Graeme Harper	Nick Whitby	20 November 1990
Ken and Harry are approached by Gabby McIntosh (Dave Atkins), the owner of a motorbike shop, who tells them about the theft of a BMW 8500 motorbike purchased by a customer who provided a false name and bank details and has now defaulted on the loan payments. Ken decides to track the culprit down by posing undercover as a Hells Angel and using the false ploy of selling his bike to an illegal workshop as a means of tracing the individual who stole McIntosh's bike. What he discovers is an elaborate counterfeiting operation that involves forged number plates, tax discs and documentation. Moreover, Laura and Rocky have been hired to trail Victor Howells (Stephen Persaud), who has been recently released from prison, and has been described by Ken's client Mr Pollock (Malcolm Sinclair) as a dangerous and vengeful individual. When Howells confronts the pair, he informs them they have been trailing the wrong suspect and that Pollock is somehow linked to the events that led to Howells' imprisonment for the suspected theft of watches from an antique shop.
10	"Daddy's Girl"	Nicholas Laughland	Jane Hollowood	27 November 1990
A big society wedding is taking place at Upper Ridley Hall between Sir Alan (Lionel Jeffries) and Lady Tessa Bolton's (Susannah York) daughter, Kate (Helena Michell), and Rupert de Borchgrave (James Saxon), a Belgian count; CBS have been hired to manage the security for the event. Whilst setting up the security system, Ken and Harry observe family members and guests who start behaving suspiciously. Ken discovers that Lady Tessa has been threatened by Johnny Hunter (Nicholas Jones) over a mysterious brown package; he presses Lady Tessa for details and discovers that she is being blackmailed in return for not revealing a devastating revelation about Kate's father. Meanwhile, Rocky and Laura assist Kate with fitting her wedding dress, and she admits that she is not interested in marrying De Borchgrave, since she is secretly in a relationship with Phillip Braithwaite (Owen Teale), the estate manager.
11	"Best Left Buried"	Matthew Evans	Paddy Fletcher, Richard LeParmentier	4 December 1990
CBS have been employed to guard a derelict church which is due to be demolished and replaced by a development of luxury flats by local property developer Donald Bannerman (Michael Gough). Later, a violent thunderstorm reveals some ancient statues within the building, and an archaeologist, Dr. Freda Butler (Julia Hills), asserts that the statues date to a time when the building was a Cistercian monastery. Her wishes to access the site are rebuffed by Bannerman, but Ken lets her sneak in. The following day, Bannerman threatens to cancel CBS's security contract for the building after a JCB is vandalised, which Harry blames on his security guard Frank (Paul Angelis) who was guarding the site that night. The following night, the crypt is flooded, and Bannerman goes on his word, cancels the contract and passes the security operations onto Jack Fentiman (Derek Fowlds), a rival of Harry's. With the reputation of CBS now in jeopardy, Ken finds out that Frank was paid by DS McKinley (Lee Montague) and Fentiman to commit sabotage after threatening to reveal to Harry his dismissal from his previous employment; Ken is determined to prove Fentiman and McKinley's guilt and restore the reputation of CBS. Meanwhile, Rocky falls for Trisha Downey (Jane Horrocks), a talented snooker player from Lancashire, who he persuades to take part in local competition as a means of getting noticed by talent scout Mickey Tucker (Tenniel Evans). Last appearance of Tony Caunter as Bertie.
12	"Thicker Than Water"	Anthony Garner	Bernard Dempsey	11 December 1990
Ken and Harry are approached by Margery Keeverton (Ciaran Madden), who is currently looking after her late uncle Geoffrey's stately home. She informs them that she has been receiving numerous nuisance calls and believes she is being followed over an unpaid debt. Ken and Harry offer to keep watch on the house; one night, they nearly apprehend the culprit when they discover plastic bullets in a coat pocket left by the mystery assailant. This leads them to a fairground, where they meet Pat Goran (Beryl Reid), who runs the shooting range. She introduces them to her grandson Ian (Spencer Leigh), and when they press him for information, he admits that he has been lurking around Margery's house, which he claims is rightfully his since Geoffrey was his father. Concurrently, CBS is tasked by a pair of Northumbrian farmers, Joe (Alen Hockey) and Callum Trevellyan (Brendan Healy) to recover their prize-winning sheepdog stolen prior to upcoming sheepdog trials in Haltwhistle. Rocky offers to help recover their dog, but is unwittingly led into a scam organized by the Trevellyans.
13	"The Tender Trap"	John Woods	Veronica Henry	18 December 1990
A few weeks before Christmas, Ken is hired by Lawrence Drake (Ronald Pickup), a wealthy ex-racing driver, to track his wife Pamela (Cheryl Campbell), whom he suspects is committing adultery. When Pamela and her boyfriend Alex Cavendish (Art Malik) are robbed one night, her jewelry is stolen, and she tries to recoup the blackmail money by gambling heavily and borrowing cash from loan sharks. She confronts Ken and tells him not to tell Lawrence about Alex or the stolen jewelry. Laura visits Alex, posing as a magazine researcher, and finds out that he is a wine importer. At a wine tasting, they make the discovery that Alex has been collaborating with the thieves behind the robbery and is selling his stock at cut-rate prices. Meanwhile, Rocky assists Pandora (Emma Wray), a Liverpudlian teenager, to help track down her long-lost father who left her mother shortly before she was born. Harry has problems trying to organize a Christmas party at The Drum when it becomes apparent that none of his friends will attend.

=== Series 6 (1991) ===
Harry and Ken continue to run Crawford Boon Security, which sees its trade and reputation go from strength to strength, despite its earlier setbacks. Meanwhile, Ken has moved out of his canal boat and is now lodging at a derelict cottage, which he has agreed with the landlord to renovate in return for living there rent-free. The restoration of Ken's cottage continues to be an ongoing theme throughout the course of this series, but he is continuously beset with setbacks when he finds himself inundated with cases, ranging from dealing with a pair of drugs traffickers who steal drugs from the local hospital, bringing to justice a corrupt landlord who uses unscrupulous tactics to force out his tenants in return for a lucrative property deal, finding himself in the middle of an ongoing quarrel between the local gentry and a sheep farmer over land rights, investigating a lawyer who used deceitful tricks in order to successfully push through a libel case and protecting a family from a vengeful ex-convict who demands his rightful share of the proceeds from an earlier robbery. The relationship between Ken and Harry develops further through this series; for instance, when they find themselves locked in a vault, they reminisce about their past life in the fire service and mull about the meaning of life, and later on they find out that living together is not as easy as working together when they are assigned to look after a stately home. Increasingly they start to look out for each other; when Harry tries to prevent Ken from being swindled by an ex-lover when it turns out she is a seasoned con artist, Ken returns the favor by saving Harry from being hoodwinked by an alluring woman when it turns out she is using him to arrange a robbery at a facility CBS have been hired to guard. Although the series was filmed entirely on location as of the previous few series, for the episode 'Two Men in a Vault', the scenes set inside the vault were filmed at Central's studios in Nottingham. This series was the first to be filmed in NICAM stereo. Moreover, the opening titles for this series were the last to be shot on film and also the last to be overseen by its co-creator Bill Stair, who died in May 1991, a few months before the transmission of this series.

No.	Title	Directed by	Written by	Original release date
1	"Help Me Make It Through the Night"	Matthew Evans	Bernard Dempsey, Kevin McNally	24 September 1991
Ken has sold his canal boat and is now in the process of buying a run-down cottage in the village of Upper Ridley, which he has offered to renovate in return for living there rent-free. John Pritchard (Tim Wylton), who runs a health club, approaches CBS to provide security for his venue, although his one condition is that the guards must wear tracksuits in order to blend in with the club members. Harry promotes Rocky to the role of 'Executive' and asks him to hire college students to fill these roles. The experience is plagued with problems, from tracksuits that are too small to a mouthy feminist student, Vicky (Sophie Thompson), who continuously berates Rocky. Meanwhile, Ken is approached by John Dewar (Michael Feast), owner of a local dairy, who suspects that his wife Melissa (Jenny Agutter) is having an affair and wants him to trail her. Harry and Ken follow her to a bandstand, where they see her walk off with a man; Ken later finds out that his name is Paul Lyle (Stephen Dillane), and upon inspecting his hotel room, he discovers that he is planning to organize a robbery at the dairy.
2	"Two Men in a Vault"	Nicholas Laughland	Peter Palliser	1 October 1991
Ken and Harry have been asked to check up on Don Jakes (Don Henderson), a security guard they employed at Unicorn Deposit Ltd, a safety deposit company. Unbeknownst to them, they walk into a robbery of one of the vaults that has just taken place, and an unknown assailant locks them inside. The culprit turns out to be Don, who has stolen the money and is planning to escape with the loot to Argentina with his girlfriend Billie (Patricia Kerrigan). Back at her flat, Laura has been receiving obscene phone calls, and had planned on arranging to meet Ken. When Ken fails to turn up, she tries to contact Ken and Harry but to no avail. She soon gets suspicious and asks Rocky to help investigate their whereabouts. First appearance of Mark Benton as Charlie Hardiman.
3	"Trial and Error"	Laurence Moody	Mark Street, Matthew Faulk	8 October 1991
A ruthless landlord, Michael Roach (Sean McGinley), has been taken to court by his tenants for pressuring them into leaving so that he can carry out plans to redevelop the site. Some time before, Ken had been hired by a group of residents, Azin Hussain (Bhasker Patel) and George (Hugh Lloyd) and May Jenkins (Gabrielle Blunt), to gather evidence that could be used to convict Roach for his crimes. They inform Ken that Hussain was recently attacked by Jimmy Craven (Wayne Foskett), one of Roach's thugs, when he tried to stop them from ransacking the Jenkins' flat. The attacks had been going on for a regular basis and they believe Roach is behind the attacks, so Ken investigates to find out who paid Craven to carry out these attacks. The investigation is far from straightforward, since Ken and Rocky continuously find their attempts to gather evidence squandered by Roach's people.
4	"Coverup"	Matthew Evans	Jane Hollowood	15 October 1991
Ken is finally making a start on renovating his new home. One day, his neighbor Pam Strong (Marjorie Yates), a widow of a fireman, approaches Ken and informs him about her concerns over her son John (Lee Whitlock), who has become very withdrawn lately; she is worried that he has been involved in drugs. It turns out that John has befriended Mark (Christopher Eccleston), who lodges at a nearby farm. One day, the pair steal a car and take a joyride around town; later, they are involved in a hit and run incident with a man and a woman. One of the victims turns out to be John Harlon (Matthew Marsh), a doctor at the local hospital whom John recognizes since he helped get him a job as a porter; Mark then pressures John into keeping silent about the incident. Laura's flatmate Hilary (Elizabeth Ash), a nurse at the local hospital, helps Rocky track down John at the hospital where they work, where he witnesses Mark pressuring John into stealing drugs from the stockroom to use them for drugs trafficking, thus confirming the accusations of John's involvement with drugs. Meanwhile, Laura discovers that the other victim, Ann Fielding (Carmen du Sautoy), somehow had her details about the incident withheld from hospital records due to a personal request made by Dr Harlon, whom she suspects may have a connection with Ann.
5	"The Barefaced Contessa"	Nicholas Laughland	Helen Slavin	22 October 1991
CBS have been approached to provide security for a charity auction at Kedleston Hall in Derbyshire. During the event, Ken bumps into Jean (Gemma Craven), an old flame of his who left him back in 1981 and later married an Italian count, Vincenzo di Cesare. Jean appeals to Ken for help; she informs him that she and her daughter Isabella (Robin McCaffey) have escaped from Vincenzo since he was beating her. She has now run off with his car and money, claiming that he is after her. Harry is deeply suspicious about Jean's motives, but despite his misgivings, Ken soon falls for her. Harry decides to investigate and sees a man named Enzo (Ian Sears) violently push her into a car at her bank. He later confronts a scruffy individual who has been snooping around Jean and Isabella's car, who turns out to be Jerry Owens (Robert Demerger), a debt collector hired to repossess their car. He admits that Jean and Isabella are well-known con artists with a string of credit offences between them. Harry tries to convince Ken about Jean's true motives before he is conned by the pair, but he refuses to accept that Harry's accusations may be ultimately true.
6	"Lie of the Land"	John Strickland	Tim Firth	29 October 1991
A pheasant shoot is taking place at the woods in the grounds of Whitley Hall. The owner, Lord Melverly (Duncan Bell), employs CBS to organize security for the shoot, since he is concerned it could be disrupted by saboteurs. On his way to the grounds, Ken discovers a Morris Minor Traveller parked in the woods; upon inspection, he finds a shotgun in it. He later hears that the vehicle belongs to Ray Cotteley (Frank Windsor), a former gamekeeper for Lord Melverly, who was sacked a few years back due to an accusation that he had poisoned sheep belonging to John Shepley (Jerome Flynn), Melveley's neighbor who he turns out to be in a dispute with. Later, it becomes apparent that Lord Melverly despises the villagers since he believes that his grounds and the local land belong to him. Later that night, Ken, Laura and Rocky discover Shepley's wife Amanda (Maggie O'Neill) digging in the woods. She claims she is looking for buried treasure. Ken decides to investigate the feud between Melverley and the Shepleys further, and the solution could be found within the treasure.
7	"Lost on the Range"	Laurence Moody	Paul Mari	5 November 1991
CBS is approached by Vincent Batten (Terence Rigby) to provide security for a local stables where he owns a number of horses after it was vandalized. Batten claims the security is needed for insurance purposes. Later, whilst Rocky is on watch duty, one of the prized stallions The Sultan is stolen. Following the robbery, Harry offers to do a complementary security survey of Vincent's house whilst Ken investigates the vandalism and theft of the horse. Ken confronts Meia (Cathryn Bradshaw), one of the stablehands who happens to live with a group of travelers nearby, about the robbery, though her father Bull (Bryan Pringle) strongly denies the accusations. Late one night, Rocky sees Meia lurking around the stables and locks her in a barn. She manages to escape, but is arrested shortly after. When questioned, she denies stealing Sultan, claiming she was there to collect medicine for her horse Nell, which was given by her employer Helen Davidson (Angharad Rees) who runs the stables. In an effort to clear her name, Bull and Rocky search the countryside in order to locate the missing horse. Harry and Laura discover that Jordan (Jesse Birdsall), who manages Vincent's business affairs, is having an affair with Vincent's wife Greta (Kate Buffery). In the process, they discover that the couple have been linked to an insurance scam.
8	"Pillow Talk"	Anthony Garner	Susan Wilkins	12 November 1991
Lawyer Caroline Mortlake (Isla Blair) finds herself and her teenage daughter Emma (Liza Walker) being stalked by a mysterious man in a raincoat. She employs Harry to administer security and put a stop to his actions. They discover that the man who has been trailing them is Bill Webster (Timothy Spall), a reporter from a local newspaper, who has been ordered by his boss Eddie Morgan (James Launceston) to gather enough evidence to get her struck off. Later, Bill finds his brakes cut after lurking around Caroline's office; he angrily confronts CBS and accuses Ken of tampering with his car. Ken and Harry ask Caroline why she has been trailed by Bill, and she informs them she recently won a successful libel case against Webster; her client, radio DJ and entrepreneur Steve Reeves (Bill Nighy), won £40,000 in damages after being accused by the paper for sleeping with underage girls. Later, Ken sees Caroline having lunch with Webster, and the situation becomes more complicated. Meanwhile, Rocky tries to fend off Emma's affections for him by pretending that Laura is his girlfriend.
9	"Cab Rank Cowboys"	Michael Winterbottom	Peter Mann	19 November 1991
Ken is approached by his old friend Ray Watts (Roger Lloyd-Pack), who runs a taxi cab firm. He appeals to him after he finds his executive cabs being stolen on a regular basis. Ken offers to arrange security for the site, and he soon suspects that John Blake (Stratford Johns) owner of a nearby garage, is stealing the vehicles to sell them on for profit. Harry and Rocky are doubtful about Ken's accusations and decide to investigate themselves and find the real culprit behind these thefts.
10	"Houseguests"	Mike Vardy	Peter Palliser	26 November 1991
Harry is approached by a wealthy couple to look after their country mansion for the weekend to keep an eye on their antiques. He offers Ken to join him, but they soon find that living together is more difficult than it seems, and they quickly get on each other's nerves. Their animosity is soon quashed when Ken begins to suspect that Harry has purposely been persuaded to leave his flat for the weekend. Upon their return, they discover that his flat has been used to gain access to his neighbor's safe.
11	"Bad Pennies"	Graeme Harper	Robin Mukherjee	3 December 1991
Ken and Harry have been hired to organize security for a couple, Malcolm (John Bowe) and Jessica Marston (Mel Martin), against an ex-con, Stan Keating (Warren Clarke), who is seeking vengeance against them. It turns out that Stan has recently been released from prison and is now after his former accomplice Malcolm to regain his rightful share of the loot from an earlier robbery they did together. He discovers that his share is missing, and Malcolm has married his former girlfriend Jessica. To complicate matters further, he finds out that his daughter Annabelle (Julia Dunlop) is unaware of his existence. Stan is now out on the warpath, so as Ken and Harry try to resolve the situation, it proves more dangerous than they could conceive. Meanwhile, Rocky is busy planning a car rally event; however, Laura ends up having to do most of the organizing.
12	"When Harry Met Janice"	Tom Clegg	Bernard Dempsey	10 December 1991
CBS have hired to organize security at a lingerie warehouse. Later, Harry meets Janice Phillips (Lizzie McInnery), who takes a shine on him that quickly develops into a relationship. Ken think this is all too coincidental and decides to investigate further about Janice's motives. He soon finds out that she and her husband Jack (Dennis Waterman) are planning to rob the warehouse, and Janice is using Harry to gain access to the plans of the building's elaborate security system, which happen to reside at their office. To avoid potential humiliation for Harry and CBS, Ken works out a plan to get Harry out of this mess and prevent the Phillips from successfully pulling out the robbery.
13	"Stamp Duty"	Nicholas Laughland	Helen Slavin	17 December 1991
Ken has been hired to track down a witness for an upcoming trial who has recently vanished. Paul Booth (Martin Poole) is currently standing trial for robbery, and the source of his only alibi, Martin Mullholland (James Nesbitt), who would have proved crucial in verifying his innocence, has gone missing. Ken's efforts to track him down prove fruitless, since Martin eludes him at every opportunity, and so Ken ropes Rocky in to assist him. It becomes apparent that a couple of crooks are on Mullholland's trail, and Ken and Rocky find themselves in a tricky situation when they find themselves handcuffed to Mulholland.

=== Christmas special (1991) ===
In addition to the sixth series, Central also commissioned a 90-minute Christmas special which was to air on Christmas Eve. It was intended to be one of the focal points of ITV's Christmas schedule; that year alone, ITV invested £38 million in their programs over the Christmas schedule, which included special episodes for the likes of Taggart, The Darling Buds of May, Minder and Sherlock Holmes as a means of tackling competition from the BBC. This was not the first episode set during the Christmas period; however, this was only feature-length standalone episode commissioned and produced during the show's existence. This episode was dedicated to the series co-creator Bill Stair, who died earlier that year in May 1991. It is also notable for featuring the final appearance of supporting character Laura Marsh, played by Elizabeth Carling, who had stayed on for three series since the beginning of Series 4 back in 1989. She departed owing to commitments for a UK tour of The Rocky Horror Picture Show.

No.	Title	Directed by	Written by	Original release date
1	"The Night Before Christmas"	John Woods	Peter Palliser	24 December 1991
The season of goodwill comes at a premium at Crawford Boon Security. Harry and Ken's partnership becomes strained when they both fall for Jo Beckett (Jill Gascoine), owner of the jazz club Smoky Jo's, which she inherited from her father Ray (Peter Vaughan). Harry proclaims he has found the ideal partner for business and in life; he soon makes plans to marry her and invest in her club. Much to Ken's consternation, Harry also intends to resign his position in CBS and sell his share of the company to a rival security firm. Adding to Ken's woes, he discovers that Jo's ex-lover Mike Hubble (Alfred Molina) has been seen lurking around the club and has been stalking her lately. It turns out he has recently been released from a clinic treating his alcoholism and is after his old job back as a saxophonist in the club's house band, along with seeking a reconciliation with Jo. He becomes infuriated when he discovers that Harry and Jo are in a relationship, and he soon seeks vengeance on him, which puts Harry in grave danger. Meanwhile, Rocky aspires to be the next Olivier when he and Laura volunteer to take part in a nativity play organized by a local church. Last appearance of Elizabeth Carling as Laura Marsh.

=== Series 7 (1992) ===
CBS has been thrown into chaos when Laura announces her resignation and leaves to take up a new position in Manchester. Alex Wilton approaches Harry for the role of secretary, which he readily accepts, since Ken is currently investigating her for possibly stealing industrial secrets from her former employers. It soon turns out that Alex is an ex-convict who was imprisoned for cheque fraud. Ken utilizes her skills, as he finds them to be a useful addition to his investigations, and a bond soon develops between them that later becomes romantic by the series' end. In this final series, Ken encounters a number of investigations, including dealing with vandalism at a luxury rural retreat, protecting a housewife from her abusive husband, investigating the case of a kidnapped child, acting as a minder for a businessman who turns out to be a money launderer and going undercover at a rehabilitation hostel to infiltrate a gang who are planning a robbery. There are also significant development for Harry in this series, from being suspected by the police of getting himself and others involved in a dodgy property scheme, to masquerading as a private detective to investigate the robbery of a priceless piece of porcelain. These events help shape Harry's outlook on life, and he makes a life-changing decision after he meets Mary O'Haren: he announces to Ken that he intends on settling down with her and retiring from the security business, thus putting an end to his and Ken's longstanding partnership. Rocky is also given more to do in this series; at one point he is suspected of stealing jewelry from the company's safe and resigns in disgust, inadvertently leading to a strike over the security workers who protest over his 'unfair dismissal'. The title sequence for this series, now shot on videotape, provides a retrospective feel on the show's past by containing clips from title sequences from earlier series, along with other significant moments in Ken's career as a private investigator.

No.	Title	Directed by	Written by	Original release date
1	"MacGuffin's Transputer"	Nicholas Laughland	Peter Palliser	8 September 1992
Laura has resigned from CBS, since she felt Harry was taking her for granted, and has accepted a junior management position in Manchester. Harry is desperate to find a new secretary, but all of the applicants he has interviewed have proved unsatisfactory. Meanwhile, Ken is approached by Roger MacGuffin (Peter McEnery), a hardware designer who works for the computer company Pictel. He claims that his former secretary Alexandra Wilton has been stealing designs for the company's latest transporter; he wants Ken and Harry to trail her since she resigned from the company with no apparent reason and has a criminal record for cheque fraud. Later, Ken sees a man handing Alex a cheque that she quickly refuses, and he suspects this is the man to whom she is selling the computer designs. The man turns out to be her father, and Ken's cover is soon blown when Alex spots him standing on the fire escape near her window. Later on, Alex applies for the job of secretary with CBS, which provides Harry the ideal chance to hire her so Ken can keep tabs on her movements. First appearance of Saskia Wickham as Alex Wilton.
2	"Queens' Gambit"	Nick Hurran	Helen Slavin	15 September 1992
At a rotary club dinner, Harry meets his old friend Joe Green (John Nettles), an entrepreneur who has been at the receiving end of a hate campaign involving a number of malicious incidents. He suspects someone is trying to prevent him from pushing ahead with a business deal to buy Maxmillians, a restaurant in Derby. He asks Harry to invest in the restaurant deal along with investigating the attacks against him. Later, Harry persuades Ken to act as a minder for Green. Ken fails to get on with Joe, who is arrogant and pushy towards him. Joe's wife Sheila (Barbara Flynn) is concerned that her husband now has a bodyguard, since she suspects Ken will decide to investigate him. One evening after Ken drives off with Joe, Sheila meets up with her friend Karen Verdi (Lynsey Baxter), who wants to find out more about what Ken knows about Joe, and offers to stage a ruse in order to meet him. It becomes clear that the two were behind the attacks. Meanwhile, Harry is due to take a package for Joe to the Isle of Man. Unbeknownst to him, Joe is planning to send the money to an illegal offshore bank account for a certain Mr Verdi who previously owned the restaurant.
3	"Walkout"	John Stroud	Jane Hollowood	22 September 1992
Late one night, a widow, Mrs Van Bueren (Deborah Norton), finds her house has been broken into, although her jewelry box has been left unscathed. She hires Ken to look after the jewelry and store it in the safe at CBS. At the office, Harry is being shown security products by Mr Fraser (David Beames), a rep from a security wholesalers firm. Unsatisfied, Harry ejects him from the office, but not before Fraser has a chance to glimpse the contents of the safe. Meanwhile, Rocky has been acting very strangely; he has sold his motorbike for a car and has repeatedly failed to turn up for work, all due to the fact he is fallen in love with Melanie King (Debra Beaumont), a cashier at the bank. Later that night, whilst Alex goes into the office to make a phone call, she notices Rocky walking off with a bag. The next morning, Harry discovers that Mrs Van Beauren's jewelry has gone missing and accuses Rocky of stealing it after finding a golden locket in his car and discovering that he has financial problems. When questioned, Rocky furiously denies the allegations and resigns. When Harry claims he has sacked him, in retaliation, Alex organizes a strike with the security guards. Mrs Van Bueren asks Ken to investigate the robbery, whilst a reluctant Harry subcontracts his work to a rival firm run by Mr Holden (Robert Durden), where he makes a shocking discovery about his chief investigator Mr Potts. Last appearance of Oliver Smith as Smudger.
4	"Deadline"	Derek Banham	Terry Etchells	29 September 1992
Ken is hired to trail Christine Pryall (Claire Higgins) and is requested to protect her from nuisance husband Jed (Niall O'Brien). From the outset it looks like a straightforward case for Ken that will help pull back CBS from the brink of bankruptcy. Things start to go awry for Ken when he receives strange phone calls during the night and later discovers that the office has been broken into and his records on the Pryall case have been stolen. He also finds out that Christine's home has been ransacked and she has ended up in hospital. Once the police intervene, only then do Ken and Harry discover how dangerous their latest job has become. Last appearance of Benny Young as DS Terry Hatchard.
5	"Away From it All"	Tim Dowd	Bernard Dempsey	6 October 1992
After handling a messy adultery case, Ken feels strained and exhausted. He is on the brink of quitting the private investigation business when Harry intervenes in order to relieve him of his executive stress. They go on a short stay at Greenham Grange, a luxury rural retreat run by his nephew. During their stay, they discover strange things afoot and discover that life at the retreat is not as serene as it seems when cases of vandalism and threats are reported.
6	"Message in a Bottle"	Nick Hurran	Harry Holmes	13 October 1992
Harry is organizing an angling competition to help drum up trade for CBS and is on the lookout for anglers to volunteer and take part. As the competition gets underway, Ken meets businessman Malcolm Ashworth (Martin Jarvis); it turns out that he is in financial difficulties and his business has run into trouble. Later, Ken answers a young child's S.O.S. on the company's radio equipment, and he and Rocky decide to investigate further. They soon become embroiled in a suspected kidnap case and find themselves in hot water.
7	"The Sharp End"	Matthew Evans	Tony Jordan	20 October 1992
Alex and Harry attempt to achieve a lucrative security contract, but in the process they find themselves at odds with Ken, who is suspicious of the company they are dealing with. Meanwhile, Ken is approached by Sarah Blake (Carolyn Pickles), a market trader who appeals to him to help her and some fellow stall holders to fend off an extortionist who has been terrorizing them with his thugs. Assistance comes in the form of Ken and Rocky, whose involvement is intensified by the fact that Sarah is the widow of one of Ken's former colleagues from the fire service.
8	"Is There Anybody There?"	Ken Horn	Helen Slavin	27 October 1992
Ken and Harry are approached by Jim Thisk (David Haig) to provide security for Monkton Manor, where they are tasked with guarding valuable antique fittings from a gang of professional thieves who have been scouting the place. After spending an uncomfortable night, they discover from the housekeeper Mrs. Whitworth (Margery Mason) that the mansion was formerly owned by Terry Carpenter (David Troughton) who committed suicide after suspecting that his wife was committing adultery. Ken later finds Terry hiding in an attic room alive and well, it turns out he faked his suicide. To confound matters, his brother Paul (William Armstrong) is in the process of securing a lucrative business deal and when he discovers that his brother is alive, he schemes to murder the 'already dead.'
9	"Minder"	Anthony Garner	Peter Palliser	3 November 1992
Ken's birthday is coming up, so Alex and Rocky are planning a surprise party for him at his cottage. Since they want Ken out of the way for a couple of days, Harry pretends that he needs a minder, claiming that he has been harassed by an ex-convict who was convicted by a jury of which he was the foreman. Ken does not realize that Harry is pulling his leg, since he has received no threats; however, unbeknownst to Harry, he really is in danger. Last appearance of Mark Benton as Charlie Hardiman.
10	"Love or Money"	Derek Banham	Alan Whiting	10 November 1992
After making a fortune on the pools, an elderly couple, Bob (Norman Bird) and Eileen Wooley (Freda Dowie), start to receive a series of nasty letters and threats. They hire Ken to protect them from a gang of unscrupulous money-grabbers who are after their cash. But the job becomes complicated when he finds himself in serious jeopardy and becomes targeted.
11	"Blackballed"	Nick Hurran	Tony Etchells	17 November 1992
One morning, Harry is raided by the fraud squad and finds himself arrested on the charge of being involved in an illegal property investment. Ken is surprised by this revelation, which threatens to derail their enduring friendship, since he and Alex begin to realize that Harry is not as trustworthy as he seems. Later, Harry is released on bail, but when he appeals to Ken for assistance and to help clear his name, he finds Ken difficult to deal with. Having trusted Harry for years, he now doubts his integrity, particularly by the revelation that Harry has been mixing within some crooked businessmen. His popularity isn't helped when it becomes known that he encouraged a number of his friends to invest in the dodgy scheme. Ken finds himself unsure whether to stick by Harry or permanently sever their friendship.
12	"Whispering Grass"	Anya Camilleri	Helen Slavin	24 November 1992
Alex's former boyfriend David Kennedy (Sean Pertwee) has just been released from prison, and she finds herself in danger of letting her heart rule her head when she worries he may be getting involved in crime again whilst he resides at a hostel for rehabilitation. Ken and Rocky go undercover to find out more about Kennedy's involvement, which soon puts them in an explosive situation.
13	"Shot in the Dark"	A.J. Quinn	Tony Jordan	1 December 1992
Late one night, a robbery takes place at a stately home owned by Donald Blake (Michael Kitchen), and a priceless piece of porcelain is stolen. The next day, CBS have been assigned to provide security at the annual Wrydale Country Show. Harry breaks up a quarrel between an irate stall holder and a middle-aged Irish woman, Mary O'Haren (Britta Smith). Later on, he gets to know her more and brazenly claims that he is a private investigator after Mary states how she admires detective films. Word soon gets round, and Blake gets his estate manager Stephen Alwyn (Stephen Tompkinson) to hire Harry in order to investigate the theft. Ken is doubtful about Harry's competence as a private investigator but is persuaded by Harry to swap places so he can keep an eye on the security. The place is currently run as a health farm, and Harry goes undercover as a patient. He soon finds himself in danger, so Ken offers to assist him since nobody suspects his involvement with the case. Later he meets a resident, Buster (Brian Murphy), who turns out to be a former cat burglar. He persuades him to infiltrate the building's security system. Buster later informs him that the assailant must have had a key to access the collection. Ken believes it's an inside job among the staff, and his suspicions are confirmed when he overhears Donald's estranged wife Rebecca (Eve Matheson) telling an unseen person at the stables that she plans to arrange a rendezvous later that evening. At a fireworks display that same evening, a scream is heard in the stables. Harry, Mary and Rocky rush over to find Rebecca crouched over Ken, who has been shot. At the hospital Harry admits to Mary that he is not a private investigator, but she encourages him to set a trap to lure and finally identify the suspect behind the robbery and shooting.

=== Special (1995) ===
Although advertised as a one-off last ever episode, this special was in fact a standard episode from Series 7. Held off from transmission since it was made in 1992, it contains no references to Ken's developing romantic relationship with Alex or Harry's resignation from CBS at the end of the respective series, which sets this episode before the events of 'Shot in the Dark', which was clearly intended to be the actual last ever episode. Although it was rumoured to be the first episode of a Series 8 aborted due to Elphick's commitments with the first series of Harry, or postponed by ITV due to scheduling issues with the number of episodes at the time, those theories failed to be substantiated further. It was delayed due to the fact that this episode failed to be completed in time for transmission and had to be postponed until the network could find a suitable slot.

No.	Title	Directed by	Written by	Original release date
1	"Thieves Like Us"	Anthony Garner	Peter Palliser	1 May 1995
CBS have been approached to go undercover at a hotel to solve a jewelry robbery at the hotel's strongroom. Max Cone (Tom Mannion), the former head of security, has been imprisoned for the suspected theft; however, his fiancée Claire Walters (Fiona Gillies) and her father, hotel owner Jeremy Walters (Philip Voss), believe he is innocent and suspect that the hotel manager Bruce Aurit (Nick Dunning) and the head of security Mike Puckett (Jason Isaacs) organized the robbery. Ken and Harry disguise themselves as conference organizers whilst Rocky and Alex go undercover as porter and chambermaid respectively. Ken and Harry pretend to sack all the staff at CBS and place the office out for sale; they get Lennie (Aaron Shirley), one of their 'disgruntled former' employees, to approach Bruce and Mike claiming that the company is in financial difficulties and he intends on robbing the safe. Bruce is drugged by Ken and Harry, which enables Alex to steal his key; she later tries to steal Mike's key, but he soon rumbles Ken and Harry when he catches them searching through his hotel room. He discovers they are planning a robbery of the hotel's safe and demands to get involved in return for his silence. What he does not know is that he has been lured into a trap to prove that he and Bruce were behind the earlier robbery as a means of producing evidence of Max's innocence.
