= European Soul =

Studio album by Citizens!
- Released: 13 April 2015
- Genre: Pop
- Length: 56:29
- Label: Kitsuné

Citizens! chronology
Here We Are (2012)	European Soul (2015)

Professional ratings
Aggregate scores
Source	Rating
Metacritic	59/100
Review scores
Source	Rating
PopMatters	(7/10)

European Soul is the second studio album by British indie rock band Citizens!. It was released in April 2015 under Kitsuné.

== Track list ==
No.	Title	Length
1.	"Lighten Up"	4:05
2.	"Waiting for Your Lover"	3:43
3.	"European Girl"	2:46
4.	"My Kind Of Girl"	3:10
5.	"Only Mine"	3:05
6.	"Brick Wall"	3:12
7.	"Trouble"	3:46
8.	"I Remember"	4:03
9.	"Have I Met You?"	3:39
10.	"Xmas Japan"	4:12
11.	"Are You Ready?"	3:54
12.	"All I Want Is You"	3:48
13.	"Mercy"	3:40
14.	"Idiots"	3:36
15.	"Lighten Up (Cesare Remix)"	5:50
