= Sugarolly Days =

Studio album by Jim Diamond
- Released: 1994
- Recorded: 1994
- Genre: Folk
- Length: 46.45
- Label: Righteous Records; Total Records; River Records
- Producer: Jim Diamond, Rafe McKenna

Jim Diamond chronology
Jim Diamond (1993)	Sugarolly Days (1994)	The Best of Jim Diamond (1999)

Sugarolly Days is a 1994 album by Jim Diamond. It is a collection of Scottish folk songs. Gallagher & Lyle appear on several tracks.

== Track listing ==
1. "Sugarolly Mountains" 5.59
2. "The Road to Dundee" 4.10
3. "One Day Without Fear" 4.45
4. "Ae Fond Kiss" 3.25
5. "Coulter's Candy (Ali Bali Be)" 3.39
6. "The Road to Flodigarry" 4.23
7. "Caledonia (Heartland)" 3.29
8. "Wild Mountain Thyme (Will Ye Go Lassie Go)" 3.16
9. "Eastern Promise" 2.56
10. "A Red, Red Rose" 2.45
11. "The Rowan Tree" 3.20
12. "Skye Boat Song" 4.28
