= Desire for Freedom =

Studio album by Jim Diamond
- Released: 22 September 1986
- Recorded: 1986
- Genre: soft rock
- Length: 39:54
- Label: A&M
- Producer: Jim Diamond; Paul "Wix" Wickens

Jim Diamond chronology
Double Crossed (1985)	Desire for Freedom (1986)	Jim Diamond (1988)

Desire for Freedom was singer/songwriter Jim Diamond's second studio album. Released in 1986 it featured a wide range of styles such as heartfelt ballads and stirring rockers. Singles that came from this album were "Hi Ho Silver", "Young Love (Carry Me Away)", "Desire" and "So Strong". It is currently out of print, though most tracks appear on The Best of Jim Diamond.

== Track listing ==
All tracks composed by Jim Diamond and Paul "Wix" Wickens, except where indicated.

1. "Desire" - 4:57
2. "So Strong" - 3:57
3. "Young Love (Carry Me Away)" - 4:42
4. "My Weakness Is You" - 5:05
5. "I Can't Stop" - 4:30
6. "Maybe One Day" - 3:44
7. "Hi Ho Silver" (Jim Diamond, Chris Parren) - 4:06
8. "Judy's Not That Tough" (Jim Diamond, Alan Gorrie) - 3:35
9. "You'll Go Crazy" - 4:23

== Personnel ==
- Jim Diamond – vocals
- Paul "Wix" Wickens – keyboards
- Robbie McIntosh – guitars (1, 2, 8)
- Phil Palmer – guitars (2–9)
- Graham Lyle – acoustic guitar (4)
- John McKenzie – bass (3, 4, 6, 7, 9)
- Tony Beard – drums (2–6, 8, 9)
- Tony Hicks – drums (7)
- Pandit Dinesh – percussion (1, 4, 5, 9)
- Gary Barnacle – saxophones, tenor saxophone (7)
- Dick Morrissey – tenor saxophone (2, 3)
- Pete Thoms – trombone
- Luke Tanny – trumpet
- Gavyn Wright – violin (5)
- Mark Felton – harmonica (6)
- Lance Ellington – backing vocals (1–6, 8, 9)
- Katie Kissoon – backing vocals (1–6, 8, 9)
- Chris Thompson – backing vocals (1–6, 8, 9)
- Sammy Brown – backing vocals (7)
- Vicki Brown – backing vocals (7)

=== Production ===
- Jim Diamond – producer
- Paul "Wix" Wickens – producer (1–6, 8, 9)
- Paul Staveley O'Duffy – engineer (1–6, 8, 9), mixing (1–6, 8, 9), remixing (7)
- Jim Ebdon – engineer (1–6, 8, 9)
- Pete Schweir – engineer (7)
- Brian Griffin – front cover photography
- Nick Knight – all other photography
- John Warwicker – art direction, design
