= Hi Ho Silver =

Single by Jim Diamond

from the album Desire for Freedom
- Released: 8 February 1986
- Recorded: 1986
- Genre: Pop rock, ska
- Length: 7" 4:06; 12" 4:48
- Label: A&M
- Songwriters: Jim Diamond, Chris Parren
- Producer: Jim Diamond

Jim Diamond singles chronology
"Remember I Love You" (1985)	"Hi Ho Silver" (1986)	"Young Love (Carry Me Away)" (1986)

"Hi Ho Silver" is a song by Scottish singer/songwriter Jim Diamond. It is best known for being the theme song for the British television series Boon. The song was from Diamond's second solo studio album Desire for Freedom, and it reached No. 5 on the UK chart in 1986.

== Charts ==
Chart (1986)	Peak position
Belgium (Ultratop 50 Flanders)	28
Ireland (IRMA)	5
UK Singles (OCC)	5
