= Jim Diamond (singer) =

Scottish singer-songwriter (1951–2015)

- Diamond in 1985

Background information
- Born: James Aaron Diamond; 28 September 1951; Bridgeton, Lanarkshire, Scotland
- Died: 8 October 2015 (aged 64) London, England
- Genres: Pop rock; new wave; blue-eyed soul; synth-pop
- Occupations: Singer-songwriter; musician
- Instruments: Vocals; guitar
- Years active: 1969–2015
- Labels: Bradleys; A&M; Teldec; PolyGram; Polydor; Righteous; River; Hypertension; Cherry Pop (Reissue label); Camino

James Aaron Diamond (28 September 1951 – 8 October 2015) was a Scottish singer-songwriter, best known for his three top 5 hits: "I Won't Let You Down" (1982), as the lead singer of PhD; and his solo performances "I Should Have Known Better", a United Kingdom No. 1 in 1984, and "Hi Ho Silver", the theme song from Boon, which reached No. 5 on the UK singles chart in 1986.

== Early life and career ==
Diamond was born in the Bridgeton area in the East End of Glasgow in 1951.

He started his music career at the age of 15 with Tony Diver's band, The Method. When aged 16, he also fronted a Glasgow band called Jade. That line-up included bassist Chris Glen who went on to play with the Sensational Alex Harvey Band, and Jim Lacey on lead guitar who later went on to join the Alan Bown Set. Jade played many pub, club and university gigs in London in 1969, playing at Brunel University, West London College in Cricklewood, The Pied Bull in Islington, West Hampstead Country Club, another college in Virginia Water and many more in 1969. They also supported The Move on their Scottish tour with The Stoics in the same year.

Alexis Korner then discovered Diamond, who spent the next couple of years as part of Korner's band. He provided additional and backing vocals on many of Korner's songs, most of which would appear on The Lost Album.

Diamond left Korner in 1976, to form Bandit. The line-up included future AC/DC member Cliff Williams. They were soon signed up by Arista Records and released a début album, Bandit, which failed to reach the chart. In 1979, Diamond was lead vocalist for a Japanese band called BACCO, whose debut album was Cha Cha Me.

He went to Los Angeles, California to form Slick Diamond with Earl Slick. He spent some time touring and recording and provided music for a film soundtrack. He wrote the lyrics to many songs on Carmen Maki's 1979 album Night Stalker.

== Big break ==
In 1981, Diamond formed PhD (Phillips, Hymas and Diamond), with pianist/keyboard player Tony Hymas and drummer Simon Phillips. They were signed by WEA Records and had a hit single with the multi-million selling "I Won't Let You Down".

The band later decided to part ways. In 1984, he decided to go solo and was signed to A&M Records. He had a number-one hit with "I Should Have Known Better", and was also number one in Latin America. Bob Geldof praised Diamond for publicly encouraging fans to buy the Band Aid single instead of his own.

He scored another hit soon afterward with the theme song from Boon, "Hi Ho Silver". It reached No. 5 in the UK singles chart in May 1986. Diamond is also known for some guest vocals on two Genesis band members' solo outings, including:

- "You Call This Victory" (from the movie Starship) on the album Soundtracks by Tony Banks in 1986.
- "Days of Long Ago" on the album Darktown by Steve Hackett in 1999.

The 1999 compilation The Best of Jim Diamond compiles singles and B-sides from his short time with A&M Records.

== Later years ==
In the late 1990s, Diamond teamed up with saxophonist Chris "Snake" Davis, known for his work with soul outfit M People. The pair were known as The Blue Shoes, but were later billed as Jim Diamond and Snake Davis.

In 2005, Diamond released his first studio album in eleven years, Souled and Healed. The singles "When You Turn" and "Blue Shoes" were released from this. In 2009 he re-united with Tony Hymas to produce a third PhD album entitled Three.

Jim Diamond's last album, City of Soul, released by Camino Records in 2011, featured among others Wet Wet Wet drummer Tommy Cunningham and Greg Kane of Hue and Cry. All proceeds from this album of soul music covers benefited the children's charity, Radio Clyde Cash for Kids.

== Personal life and death ==
Diamond married Christine Bailey in 1978. The couple had two children; their son Lawrence is the keyboard player of the UK indie pop group Citizens! and the former bass player of Official Secrets Act.

In the early 1980s, Diamond contracted hepatitis.

Diamond died in his sleep on 8 October 2015, at the age of 64. According to his daughter Sara, the cause of death was a pulmonary edema.

== Discography ==
=== Ph.D. ===
- Ph.D. (1981)
- Is It Safe? (1983)
- Three (2009)

=== Solo ===
==== Albums ====
===== Studio albums =====
Title	Album details	Peak chart positions			
Title	Album details	UK	NL	NOR	SWI
Double Crossed	Released: February 1985; Label: A&M; Formats: CD, LP, MC	—	38	3	18
Desire for Freedom	Released: 22 September 1986; Label: A&M; Formats: CD, LP, MC	—	—	—	—
Jim Diamond	Released: 1988; Label: Teldec; Formats: CD, LP, MC; Only released in several European countries	—	—	—	—
Jim Diamond	Released: 10 May 1993; Label: PolyGram TV; Formats: CD, MC	16	—	—	—
Sugarolly Days	Released: 1994; Label: The Righteous Recording Co.; Formats: CD	—	—	—	—
Souled and Healed	Released: February 2005; Label: Hypertension; Formats: CD	—	—	—	—
City of Soul	Released: 3 October 2011; Label: Camino; Formats: CD	—	—	—	—
"—" denotes releases that did not chart or were not released in that territory.

===== Compilation albums =====
Title	Album details
The Best of Jim Diamond	Released: 1999; Label: Spectrum; Formats: CD
I Should Have Know Better	Released: 2001; Label: Rotation; Formats: CD; Germany-only release

==== EPs ====
Title	Album details
The Caledonia EP	Released: May 1994; Label: The Righteous Recording Co.; Formats: CD
Blue Shoes	Released: 2005; Label: Hypertension; Formats: CD

==== Singles ====
Title	Year	Peak chart positions									Album
Title	Year	UK	AUS	BEL (FL)	GER	IRE	NL	NOR	NZ	SWI	Album
"Clean Up the City"	1975	—	—	—	—	—	—	—	—	—	Non-album single
"I Should Have Known Better"	1984	1	1	3	15	1	7	2	48	3	Double Crossed
"I Sleep Alone at Night"	1985	72	—	—	—	20	—	—	—	—	Double Crossed
"Remember I Love You"	1985	42	96	—	—	27	—	—	—	—	Double Crossed
"Hi Ho Silver"	1986	5	—	28	—	5	—	—	—	—	Desire for Freedom
"Desire"	1986	—	—	—	—	—	—	—	—	—	Desire for Freedom
"Young Love (Carry Me Away)"	1986	92	—	—	—	—	—	—	—	—	Desire for Freedom
"So Strong"	1986	—	—	—	—	—	—	—	—	—	Desire for Freedom
"Shout It Out"	1987	186	—	—	—	—	—	—	—	—	Non-album single
"Broadway"	1988	—	—	—	—	—	—	—	—	—	Jim Diamond (1988)
"The Last Time" (Germany-only release)	1989	—	—	—	—	—	—	—	—	—	Jim Diamond (1988)
"Not Man Enough"	1993	185	—	—	—	—	—	—	—	—	Jim Diamond (1993)
"When You Turn"	2005	—	—	—	—	—	—	—	—	—	Souled and Healed
"Morning Glory"	2011	—	—	—	—	—	—	—	—	—	City of Soul
"—" denotes releases that did not chart or were not released in that territory.
