= Official Secrets Act (band) =

British pop-rock band

- Origin: North London, England
- Genres: Pop, indie rock
- Years active: 2006–2009
- Label: One Little Indian
- Past members: Thomas Charge Burke; Alexander Dunlop Mackenzie; Lawrence James Diamond; Michael Andrew Evans

Official Secrets Act (OSA) was a pop-rock band from London, England. Thomas Burke, Alexander Mackenzie, and Lawrence Diamond formed a band at Leeds University after bonding over an interest in British military history. Michael Evans joined after catching one of their early gigs.

The band has drawn inspiration from both British and American guitar-based bands, such as Talking Heads, Futureheads and Blur. Critic Jude Rogers said of their sound, "Imagine the pure pop moments of the Waterboys or Prefab Sprout given a hefty dose of mood-enhancers. And, now and then, they tip their hats to the Divine Comedy, Jacques Brel and OMD."

OSA was the first band to perform in Black Cab Sessions's the Secret Garden Party Sessions in July 2009.

Former bassist Lawrence James Diamond is the son of singer-songwriter Jim Diamond.

== Discography ==
=== Albums ===
- Understanding Electricity (30 March 2009)

=== Singles ===
- So Tomorrow (8 December 2008)
- Girl from The BBC (16 March 2009)
- Bloodsport (15 June 2009)
