= Boon (TV series) =

British television series (1986–1992, 1995)

- Created by: Jim Hill; Bill Stair
- Starring: Michael Elphick; David Daker; Rachel Davies; Julie Graham; Neil Morrissey; Lesley-Anne Sharpe; Amanda Burton; Elizabeth Carling; Brigit Forsyth; Gordon Warnecke; Saskia Wickham
- Theme music composer: Jim Diamond
- Opening theme: "Hi Ho Silver" by Jim Diamond
- Ending theme: "Hi Ho Silver", "Texas Rangers" and other various tracks written by Dean Friedman for the series.
- Country of origin: United Kingdom
- Original language: English
- No. of series: 7
- No. of episodes: 93 (list of episodes)

Production
- Producer: Central Independent Television
- Running time: 60 minutes; 90 minute special

Original release
- Network: ITV
- Release: 14 January 1986 – 1 May 1995

Boon is a British television drama series starring Michael Elphick, David Daker, and later Neil Morrissey. It was created by Jim Hill and Bill Stair, filmed by Central Television for ITV, and originally broadcast between 1986 and 1992 with a delayed episode which aired in 1995. It revolved around the life of an ex-fireman called Ken Boon, a motorcycle-obsessed small time businessman who, at the same time, acts as a private investigator, bodyguard and general troubleshooter. Since 16 January 2017, it has been rerun on UKTV channel Drama. The first two series are currently streaming on BritBox.

The theme tune, "Hi Ho Silver" by Scottish singer Jim Diamond, became a UK top ten hit single in 1986.

== Premise ==
Ken Boon (Elphick) and Harry Crawford (Daker) are both old-fashioned "smokeys" (firemen) in the West Midlands Fire Service. In episode one, Crawford takes early retirement and moves to Spain to open a bar, leaving Ken behind. Ken attends a house fire in which a child is trapped upstairs. Realising that he must act quickly, he goes into the house without breathing apparatus and rescues the child, but he is severely injured by inhaling toxic smoke. He attempts to prove that he can still make it, but he is declared unfit for duty after collapsing during a practice simulation because his lungs have been permanently damaged, and he is forced to leave the fire service.

The basic premise of the show revolves around Ken and Harry's various business ventures, which become intertwined with various shady characters or criminal underworld figures, often requiring them to outwit or fight their way out of trouble. Along the way, the pair often encounter others in need or have been hard done by, and many of the episode sub-plots have various wrongs being put right. In later series, this became the main focus of the show, as Boon becomes a private investigator and bodyguard, with Harry's business activities becoming more of a backdrop. The comedic element usually comes from Harry's frequent minor misfortunes or his best-laid plans going awry in unexpected and sometimes farcical ways - with Ken usually having to come to his rescue and sort out the mess.

In the first series, Ken starts a market garden, the Ponderosa, in a village about 10 miles outside Birmingham, but finds that it is not working out. Harry returns from Spain after his wife leaves him for a young hairdresser. Harry has acquired a hotel in Birmingham, and offers Ken a job and a home there. On Ken's behalf, and without his knowledge, Harry places a box-number advertisement in a newspaper stating: "Ex-fireman seeks interesting work. Anything legal considered". In the second series, both Ken and Harry have expanded their business interests, with Harry investing in a larger hotel and Ken starting a motorcycle courier firm called "Texas Rangers", where he recruits fellow biker Richard "Rocky" Cassidy (Morrissey), whose general dim-wittedness provides an extra layer of comic relief.

Over the course of the third and following series, Boon establishes two private investigation firms, BDI (Boon-Daly Investigations) and Boon Investigations; and a security firm, CBS (Crawford Boon Security), a partnership with Harry in which Boon is responsible for private investigations and Harry for security. In series 1–3, Harry runs two hotels, the Grand Hotel and the Coaching Inn, and a ballroom, the Plaza Suite. In series 4, he operates a country club, Woodcote Park, before going into business with Boon in series 5.

The series moved away from Birmingham to Nottingham at the beginning of series 4, when production moved to Central Television's studios in Nottingham. The Birmingham episodes (series 2–3, and exteriors for series 1) were shot on film, but the Nottingham episodes (series 4–7) were shot on videotape, as were interior scenes for series 1. Apart from the studio interiors of series 1, all filming was done on location.

== Cast ==
The cast included Michael Elphick (Ken Boon) and David Daker (Harry Crawford). Neil Morrissey joined in the second series as Rocky, his first major television role. Other regular characters were played by Rachel Davies (Doreen Evans), Julie Graham (Moira Connolly), Lesley-Anne Sharpe (Debbie Yates), Amanda Burton (Margaret Daly), Elizabeth Carling (Laura Marsh), Brigit Forsyth (Helen Yeldham), Saskia Wickham (Alex Wilton), Joan Scott (Ethel Ellard) and Gordon Warnecke (Hanif Kurtha). Jerome Flynn appeared in the series in one of his earlier roles and Christopher Eccleston also had a small role, one of his first.

== Vehicles ==
The signature vehicle of the show is Ken Boon's red and silver 1965 BSA Lightning motorcycle - nicknamed "White Lightning" - registration number EVK 284C. Rocky Cassidy rides a black and gold 1973 Norton Commando 850 Interstate.

== Production ==
The show's writers included Geoff McQueen, Kevin McNally, Bernard Strother, Anthony Minghella, Tony McHale, Kieran Prendiville, and Veronica Henry. Ted Childs was the first executive producer. The original producer, Kenny McBain, left after the first series to produce the first two series of Inspector Morse, also for Central Independent Television.

== Episodes ==
Series	Episodes	Originally released	
Series	Episodes	First released	Last released
1	13	14 January 1986	8 April 1986
2	13	17 February 1987	1 December 1987
3	13	1 November 1988	24 January 1989
4	13	2 October 1989	20 December 1989
5	13	25 September 1990	19 December 1990
6	13	24 September 1991	17 December 1991
Christmas Special		24 December 1991	
7	13	8 September 1992	1 December 1992
Special		1 May 1995	

== Home releases ==
DVD	Release date
The Complete Series 1	11 April 2005
The Complete Series 2	20 April 2009
The Complete Series 3	27 April 2009
The Complete Series 4	23 May 2011
The Complete Series 5	12 September 2011
The Complete Series 6	16 January 2012
The Complete Series 7	9 April 2012
The Complete Series 1 to 7 Box Set	17 February 2020

== Title sequences ==
Unusually for a TV series, a different title sequence was used with every subsequent series. Rather than promote the show's overall premise, the titles were used as a thematic device to help establish the settings and plotlines for each series, chronicling a narrative progression through Ken's life as he moves onto new locations and business ventures. However, the titles do follow one central interlinking theme of Ken imagining himself as a Lone Ranger-type hero riding to the rescue on his trusty motorbike White Lighting, which helps underscore the meanings behind the lyrics of the series theme tune "Hi Ho Silver" by Jim Diamond, which in turn evokes aspects of Ken's character where his core drive is to help others in need and assist in solving their problems. In earlier series, the association between Ken riding on his motorbike whilst he envisages himself riding on horseback in a Western setting is more apparent. From series 4 onwards, the idea of Ken's soul riding around town on his motorbike provides the core theme, although this somewhat diminishes in the final series.

Series 1

The first title sequence of the series has Ken reading a Western comic strip titled "White Lightning", the camera pans to reveal a collection of Western novels, and soon he imagines himself to be the heroic cowboy from the comic strip, which is intercut with shots of him riding down a motorway towards Birmingham on his beloved motorbike which he names White Lightning after the comic strip, that would soon become a focal fixture throughout the course of this show.

Series 2

Maintaining the Western theme, the title sequence for this series is largely identical to the one in the previous series; it begins with a shot of Ken's flat above the former stables at the Coaching Inn, and sees Ken flipping through TV channels before finding a Western movie to watch. He soon imagines himself to be the hero of the film riding on a horse through the town, which gradually transforms into his motorbike 'White Lightning'.

Series 3

The titles for this series opens with a shot of Birmingham city centre, where Ken is seen entering a building on a Birmingham street. Inside he finds a vintage large format camera, he soon imagines himself as a Lone Ranger type character in a Wild West setting wandering into a saloon, where he meets Margaret and Harry. Ken tries to pull out his pistol, but is soon restrained by Margaret. Like the previous two series, the title sequence concludes with shots of Ken's horse transforming into his motorbike.

Series 4

Reflecting on the change of location for this series, the title sequence opens with a shot of Nottingham at night. Ken is in his office, where he falls asleep and "dreams" that his soul has left his body, where it exits the building to ride around town on his motorbike. Harry is standing by a TV shop watching clips from a Western and previous Boon title sequences, and is stunned when he sees the apparition rush by him. Ken soon awakes and rushes outside to suddenly witness his soul riding past him into the night.

Series 5

Much like the previous series, the opening titles maintain the theme of Ken's soul and motorbike riding off within the realm of Ken's dreams. It opens with a shot of Ken leaving his current home, a canal boat besides the CBS office building situated beside the canal basin of the River Trent. He goes into a warehouse filled with trucks and throws his keys up in the air, which his soul supposedly catches. He then sees his motorbike White Lightning race through the warehouse, which gradually transforms into the legs of a horse. Normality resumes when Ken finds his motorbike parked in a building.

Series 6

The title sequence for this series is similar in theme to the one in series four; it opens with Ken asleep in his bed at his cottage in Upper Ridley. Outside, his soul is riding through the streets of Nottingham on his motorbike. As it reaches towards his home, Ken is suddenly awakened by the noise and rushes over to find his motorbike outside his bedroom window. Instantaneously, the scene now has Ken on his motorbike entering the offices at CBS, where he is greeted by Harry and Rocky.

Series 7

The final title sequence of the series presents a largely retrospective theme that reflects on the earlier series. It features Ken wandering into a cinema, where he is greeted by Harry, who takes his ticket. Soon, Rocky appears as an usher and guides him to his seat. In the theatre, he finds a number of doppelgangers of himself in the audience staring at him; the film starts, and it contains clips from opening titles and significant moments from the previous six series, before his soul rides past him on White Lighting and hurtles through the pews. The sequence ends with Ken waking up at home in front of his television, which reveals it has all been a dream.

== History of the show ==
Although never explicitly mentioned by the show's creators, Boon shared many conceptual similarities with contemporary ITV drama series Minder - both being set in a gritty working class city (Birmingham/London), both centering around the relationship between a 'heavy' (Ken Boon/Terry McCann) and a businessman (Harry Crawford/Arthur Daley) - although one key difference being that neither Ken or Harry's activities are illegal - unlike those depicted in Minder. Both shows delved into the criminal underworld whilst exploring moral issues in the sub-plots, at the same time blending it with a certain amount of comedic relief.

According to Jim Hill (co-creator), the name 'Boon' was derived as follows: "Originally called 'Anything Legal Considered', we fell foul of the vogue of the main character's name being all or part of the title. Boon had been derived from an American TV series from the 1950s that Bill Stair and I both watched and liked. It was called 'Have Gun – Will Travel' (1957) – a troubleshooting cowboy answered distress calls. He was called Paladin and was played by the actor Richard Boone. We dropped the E and we had BOON – a modern-day trouble shooter on a motorbike instead of a steed."

Elphick and Morrissey would reunite for the Central-TV sourced horror comedy continuing the motorbike theme, I Bought a Vampire Motorcycle.

== Notes ==
The series was re-broadcast on ITV4 and Rewind TV (British TV channel) from 1 January 2026 onwards.
