= I Won't Let You Down (Ph.D. song) =

1981 single by Ph.D.

- UK 7-inch single cover

Single by Ph.D.

from the album Ph.D.
- B-side: "Hideaway"
- Released: 17 April 1981
- Studio: Ramport (London)
- Genre: Synth-pop
- Length: 4:10
- Label: WEA
- Songwriters: Jim Diamond; Tony Hymas
- Producer: Ph.D.

Ph.D. singles chronology
"Little Suzi's on the Up" (1981)	"I Won't Let You Down" (1981)	"There's No Answer to It" (1982)

"I Won't Let You Down" is a song by British band Ph.D., released as the second single from their eponymous debut studio album (1981). It entered the Australian charts in October 1981 and reached number five; it entered the UK Singles Chart in April 1982 at number 34, peaked at number three the following month. It went on to become the 23rd best-selling single of 1982 in the UK. The single also reached number one in the Netherlands and Belgium.

It was the band's biggest selling single and became one of lead singer Jim Diamond's signature songs (the song is often incorrectly credited to Diamond himself). Diamond re-recorded the song on his eponymous 1993 album Jim Diamond with a slightly different arrangement, and it remained a staple of his live shows up until his death in 2015.

== Music video ==
The original music video for the song was set in and around the Queensway area of West London. As with the band's previous single "Little Suzi's on the Up", the video is shot in a slapstick comedy style and features Jim Diamond as a well-dressed man trying to win back the affections of his lover (played by Nina Carter) (thus mirroring the theme of the song) using presents and taking her to upmarket bars and restaurants. Tony Hymas appears as the video's antagonist; in various scenes dressed in various disguises he makes unsuccessful attempts to assassinate, or maim Diamond's character in order to win the affections of the woman. He is finally successful when, posing as a car dealer, he lures Diamond into a second hand car, which is revealed to be on the end of a crane in a scrapyard being lifted up, whilst Hymas walks away with the girl as the camera zooms out and fades to black.

== Charts ==
=== Weekly charts ===
Weekly chart performance for "I Won't Let You Down"
Chart (1982)	Peak position
Australia (Kent Music Report)	5
Belgium (Ultratop 50 Flanders)	1
Ireland (IRMA)	3
Italy (Musica e dischi)	2
Netherlands (Dutch Top 40)	1
Netherlands (Single Top 100)	1
South Africa (Springbok Radio)	6
Switzerland (Schweizer Hitparade)	2
UK Singles (Official Charts)	3
West Germany (GfK)	14

=== Year-end charts ===
Year-end chart performance for "I Won't Let You Down"
Chart (1982)	Position
Australia (Kent Music Report)	37
Belgium (Ultratop 50 Flanders)	2
Netherlands (Dutch Top 40)	2
Netherlands (Single Top 100)	9
Switzerland (Schweizer Hitparade)	17
UK Singles (BMRB)	24
West Germany (Official German Charts)	28

== Certifications ==
Certifications for "I Won't Let You Down"
Region	Certification	Certified units/sales
Netherlands (NVPI)	Gold	100,000^{^}
United Kingdom (BPI)	Silver	250,000^{^}
^{^} Shipments figures based on certification alone.

== Cover versions ==
- In 1992, the song was covered by '2 Boys', which was then released in 1993, produced by Pascal Blach, Samy Deep and Bobby Luccini. The song hit the Dutch and Belgian Charts in 1993, and stayed there for 9 weeks in the Netherlands, peaking on the 20th position, and it stayed for 14 weeks in the Belgian Charts, with a 6th position peak.
- In 1999, Australian singer Kate Ceberano recorded a cover version of "I Won't Let You Down", which was released in July 1999 as the first single for her first compilation album, True Romantic. She performed the song on Hey Hey It's Saturday. The single reached position 50 on the Australian charts.
- An Italian version of the song by Zucchero, titled Tutti i colori della mia vita ("All the Colours of My Life"), was released in 2008. It reached position 7 on the Italian charts.
- American DJ Armand van Helden covered the song under the title Wings (I Won't Let You Down) in 2022, featuring singer Karen Harding.
