= Tony Hymas =

- Born: 23 September 1943 (age 83)
- Occupations: Musician, composer
- Instruments: Piano, keyboards

Anthony James Keith Hymas (born 23 September 1943) is an English keyboard player, pianist, and composer. In the Eighties he formed the band Ph.D., who had a Top 10 hit in the UK with the song "I Won't Let You Down" in 1982. He worked closely with Jeff Beck, recording with him on his 1980 album There & Back, and his 1989 album Jeff Beck's Guitar Shop.

== Career ==
Hymas started as a chorister at Exeter Cathedral School, where his contemporaries included composer and cathedral organist Barry Ferguson, percussionist Tristan Fry and singer and pianist Roger Cleverdon. After leaving school, Hymas studied piano with Harold Rubens at the Royal Academy of Music. As company pianist for the Ballet Rambert in its resurgent 'modern' form, Hymas wrote a substitute score for Glen Tetley's Rag Dances over the course of eight days. After his employment at Rambert, Hymas found work in the busy London session scene of the 1970s.

In 1974 he co-composed the theme song with Joe Campbell to the UK television series Mr. Men, based on the children's books by Roger Hargreaves.

Hymas played with Jack Bruce in the Jack Bruce Band between 1976 and 1978. He accompanied guitarist Jeff Beck, appearing with him on the 1980 album There & Back. He also wrote songs for Beck, including "Angels (Footsteps)" and "Brush with the Blues".

In 1980, Hymas and Beck's drummer Simon Philips hired Scottish singer Jim Diamond for the trio Ph.D. The band had a Top 10 hit in the UK with the song "I Won't Let You Down" in 1982, but disbanded a year later after poor sales of their subsequent singles and Diamond's decision to return to his solo career. He also plays keyboards and synthesizers on Jeff Beck's 1989 album Jeff Beck's Guitar Shop. Hymas continued to collaborate with Diamond on his solo projects; the duo released a third Ph.D. album in 2009 entitled Three and remained active until Diamond's death in 2015.

Hymas composed and sang on the track "Desperate for Your Love", the opening song on the 1985 album, The Great Balloon Race, by progressive rock band Sky.

His albums include De l'origine du Monde (2010), Chroniques de resistance (2013), Hope Street (Nato), and I Will Not Take 'But' for an Answer (2010) with the band Ursus Minor. In 2016, he recorded Tony Hymas joue Léo Ferré, an album of piano transcriptions of songs by Léo Ferré.
