= Tesla discography =

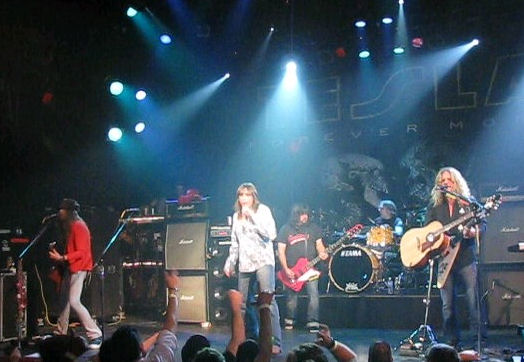
- Studio albums: 8
- Extended plays: 1
- Live albums: 5
- Compilation albums: 3
- Tribute albums: 2
- Singles: 28
- Video albums: 3

This is a complete discography of the hard rock band Tesla. They have released nine full-length studio albums, four live albums, three compilation albums, three video releases, two tribute albums, one extended play album and 23 singles.

== Albums ==
=== Studio albums ===
Title	Album details	Peak chart positions							Certifications
Title	Album details	US	AUS	AUT	JPN	NLD	SWI	UK	Certifications
Mechanical Resonance	Released: December 8, 1986; Label: Geffen; Formats: CD, CS, LP, DL	32	—	—	—	—	—	—	US: Platinum
The Great Radio Controversy	Released: February 1, 1989; Label: Geffen; Format: CD, CS, LP, DL	18	121	—	94	91	—	34	US: 2× Platinum; CAN: Gold
Psychotic Supper	Released: September 10, 1991; Label: Geffen; Formats: CD, CS, LP, DL	13	158	—	18	—	39	44	US: Platinum; CAN: Gold
Bust a Nut	Released: August 23, 1994; Label: Geffen; Formats: CD, CS, DL	20	—	37	31	—	43	51	US: Gold
Into the Now	Released: March 9, 2004; Label: Sanctuary; Formats: CD, DL	31	—	—	—	—	9	—	
Forever More	Released: October 7, 2008; Label: Ryko; Formats: CD, LP, DL	33	—	—	—	—	—	—	
Simplicity	Released: June 6, 2014; Label: Tesla; Formats: CD, LP, DL	24	—	—	—	—	—	—	
Shock	Released: March 8, 2019; Label: UMe; Formats: CD, LP, DL	21	—	—	—	—	34	—	
Homage	Released: July 17, 2026; Label: Frontiers; Formats: CD, 2LP, DL	—	—	—	—	—	—	49	

=== Acoustic albums ===
Year	Details	Peak chart positions
Year	Details	US
Twisted Wires & the Acoustic Sessions	Released: July 12, 2011; Label: Tesla; Formats: CD, DL	97

=== Live albums ===
Year	Title	US	AUS	JPN	UK	Certifications
1990	Five Man Acoustical Jam	12	145	65	59	US: Platinum; CAN: Gold
2001	Replugged Live	—	—	—		
2002	Standing Room Only	—	—	—	—	
2010	Alive in Europe	—	—	—		
2016	Mechanical Resonance Live	—	—	—	—	
2020	Five Man London Jam (Live at Abbey Road)	129	—	—		

=== Compilation albums ===
Year	Title	US	RIAA
1995	Time's Makin' Changes – The Best of Tesla	197	Platinum
2001	20th Century Masters – The Millennium Collection: The Best of Tesla	—	—
2008	Gold	—	—

=== Tribute and cover albums ===
Year	Details	Peak chart positions
Year	Details	US
2007	Real to Reel: Label: Ryko	48
2007	Real to Reel, Vol. 2: Label: Ryko	—

=== Soundtracks ===
Year	Song	Album	Comments
1993	"Last Action Hero"	Last Action Hero soundtrack	

=== Video albums ===
Year	Title
1990	Tesla – Five Man Video Band
1995	Time's Makin' Changes: The Videos & More
2008	Comin' Atcha Live! 2008

== Extended plays ==
Year	Details
A Peace of Time	Released: November 20, 2007; Label: Ryko; Formats: DL

== Singles ==
Year	Title	Chart positions			Certifications	Album
Year	Title	US	US Main. Rock	UK	Certifications	Album
1987	"Modern Day Cowboy"	—	10	—		Mechanical Resonance
1987	"Little Suzi"	91	12	—		Mechanical Resonance
1988	"Gettin' Better"	—	8	—		Mechanical Resonance
1989	"Heaven's Trail (No Way Out)"	—	13	—		The Great Radio Controversy
1989	"Hang Tough"	—	9	—		The Great Radio Controversy
1989	"Love Song"	10	7	140	RIAA: Gold	The Great Radio Controversy
1990	"The Way It Is"	55	13	—		The Great Radio Controversy
1991	"Paradise"	—	28	—		Five Man Acoustical Jam
1991	"Signs"	8	2	70		Five Man Acoustical Jam
1991	"Edison's Medicine"	—	20	80		Psychotic Supper
1991	"Call It What You Want"	—	19	—		Psychotic Supper
1992	"What You Give"	86	7	—		Psychotic Supper
1992	"Song & Emotion"	—	13	—		Psychotic Supper
1992	"Stir It Up"	—	35	—		Psychotic Supper
1994	"Mama's Fool"	—	5	—		Bust a Nut
1994	"Need Your Lovin'"	—	19	—		Bust a Nut
1995	"A Lot to Lose"	—	35	—		Bust a Nut
1995	"Need Your Lovin'" (re-release)	—	25	—		Bust a Nut
1995	"Steppin' Over"	—	31	—		Times Makin' Changes – The Best of Tesla
2004	"Caught in a Dream"	—	21	—		Into the Now
2004	"Words Can't Explain"	—	35	—		Into the Now
2007	"Thank You"	—	39	—		Real to Reel
2008	"I Wanna Live"	—	38	—		Forever More
2013	"Taste My Pain"	—	—	—		Non–album single
2014	"So Divine"	—	—	—		Simplicity
2016	"Save That Goodness"	—	—	—		Mechanical Resonance Live
