= Time's Makin' Changes – The Best of Tesla =

Greatest hits album by Tesla
- Released: November 20, 1995
- Recorded: 1986–1995
- Genre: Hard rock
- Label: Geffen Records

Tesla chronology
Bust a Nut (1994)	Time's Makin' Changes – The Best of Tesla (1995)	Replugged Live (2001)

Professional ratings
Review scores
Source	Rating
AllMusic	4/5 stars

Time's Makin' Changes – The Best of Tesla is the first greatest hits album for the rock band Tesla. It includes songs from their first four studio albums, Mechanical Resonance, The Great Radio Controversy, Psychotic Supper, and Bust a Nut, as well as their first live album, Five Man Acoustical Jam as well as one new song, "Steppin' Over".

== Track listing ==
1. "Modern Day Cowboy" – 5:18 (From Mechanical Resonance)
2. "Gettin' Better" – 3:20 (From Mechanical Resonance)
3. "Little Suzi" – 4:02 (From Mechanical Resonance)
4. "Heaven's Trail (No Way Out)" – 4:33 (From The Great Radio Controversy)
5. "The Way It Is" – 5:09 (From The Great Radio Controversy)
6. "Love Song" – 5:21 (From The Great Radio Controversy)
7. "Signs" – 3:14 (Live) (From Five Man Acoustical Jam)
8. "Paradise" – 5:09 (Live) (From Five Man Acoustical Jam)
9. "Edison's Medicine" – 4:48 (From Psychotic Supper)
10. "Song & Emotion" – 5:55 (From Psychotic Supper)
11. "What You Give" – 7:18 (From Psychotic Supper)
12. "Mama's Fool" – 6:11 (From Bust a Nut)
13. "A Lot to Lose" – 5:11 (From Bust a Nut)
14. "Steppin' Over" (Hannon, Keith, Luccketta, Wheat) – 4:22 (Previously unreleased)
15. "Changes" – 5:03 (From Mechanical Resonance)

== Charts ==
Chart (1996)	Peak position
US Billboard 200	197

== Certifications ==
Region	Certification	Certified units/sales
United States (RIAA)	Platinum	1,000,000^{‡}
^{‡} Sales+streaming figures based on certification alone.
