= Twisted Wires & the Acoustic Sessions =

Twisted Wires & the Acoustic Sessions...

Studio album by Tesla
- Released: July 12, 2011
- Genre: Acoustic rock
- Length: 64:30
- Labels: Tesla Electric Company Recordings, Inc
- Producer: Tesla

Tesla chronology
Forever More (2008)	Twisted Wires & the Acoustic Sessions... (2011)	Simplicity (2014)

Twisted Wires & the Acoustic Sessions... is the ninth studio album by American hard rock band Tesla. It was released on July 12, 2011. The album features two new tracks ("2nd Street" and "Better Off Without You") as well as re-recordings of ten previously released tracks. Five of the tracks were recorded in 2005 with Tommy Skeoch on rhythm guitar.

== Track listing ==
No.	Title	Original Album	Length
1.	"Into the Now^{a}"	Into the Now	4:26
2.	"Hang Tough^{a}"	The Great Radio Controversy	4:42
3.	"2nd Street" (Previously unreleased)		4:40
4.	"Edisons Medicine^{a}"	Psychotic Supper	5:50
5.	"What You Give"	Psychotic Supper	7:28
6.	"Better Off Without You" (Previously unreleased)		4:24
7.	"Shine Away^{a}"	Bust a Nut	7:06
8.	"I Love You^{a}" (Previously unreleased)		4:05
9.	"Changes"	Mechanical Resonance	6:05
10.	"A Lot To Lose"	Bust a Nut	5:21
11.	"Caught In A Dream"	Into the Now	4:55
12.	"Song And Emotion"	Psychotic Supper	6:20

^a Recorded in 2005 with Tommy Skeoch.

== Personnel ==
Band

- Jeff Keith - lead vocals
- Frank Hannon - electric & acoustic guitars, keyboards and backing vocals
- Brian Wheat - bass guitar and background vocals
- Troy Luccketta - drums and percussion
- Dave Rude - electric, acoustic & slide guitars and backing vocals

Production

- George Marino - mixing & Mastering
- Tesla - Producers

== Charts ==
Chart (2011)	Peak position
US Billboard 200	97
