= Frank Hannon =

American guitarist

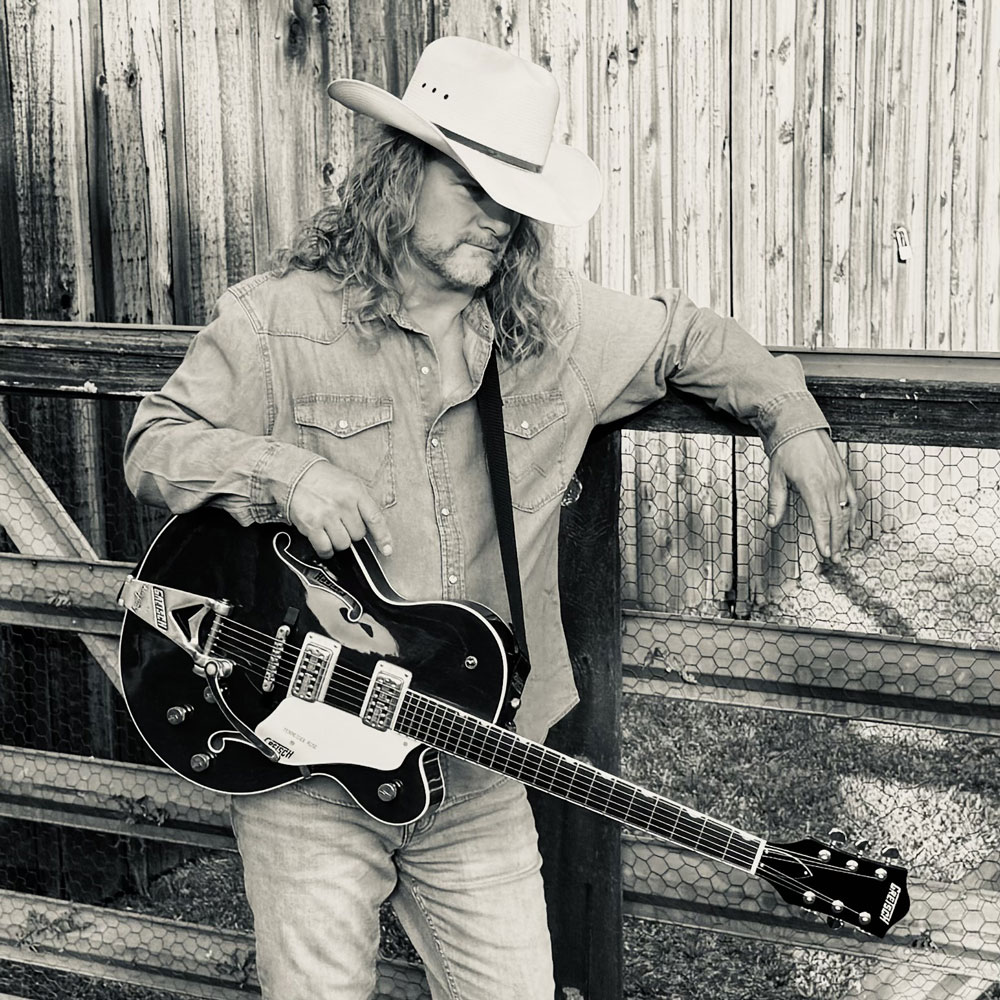

Background information
- Born: October 3, 1966 (age 59); Sacramento, California, U.S.
- Genres: Hard rock; heavy metal; blues rock; acoustic
- Occupation: Musician
- Instruments: Guitar; vocals; keyboards; piano; organ; mandolin; harmonica; bass; drums
- Years active: 1976–present
- Labels: Geffen; RedHawk
- Member of: Tesla; Frank Hannon Band; Moon Dog Mane
- Website: frankhannon.com

Frank Hannon (born October 3, 1966) is an American musician, best known as the co-founder and lead guitarist of the hard rock band Tesla. With a career spanning over four decades, he has contributed to Tesla's success and has pursued solo projects, showcasing his versatility across hard rock, heavy metal, blues, and acoustic genres. His soulful guitar playing and songwriting have earned him recognition in rock music circles.

== Early life ==
Frank Hannon was born on October 3, 1966 in Sacramento, California. Hannon started writing songs at a young age and learned to play the guitar, piano and later the Hammond B3 organ, bass guitar and drums.

== Career ==
=== Tesla ===
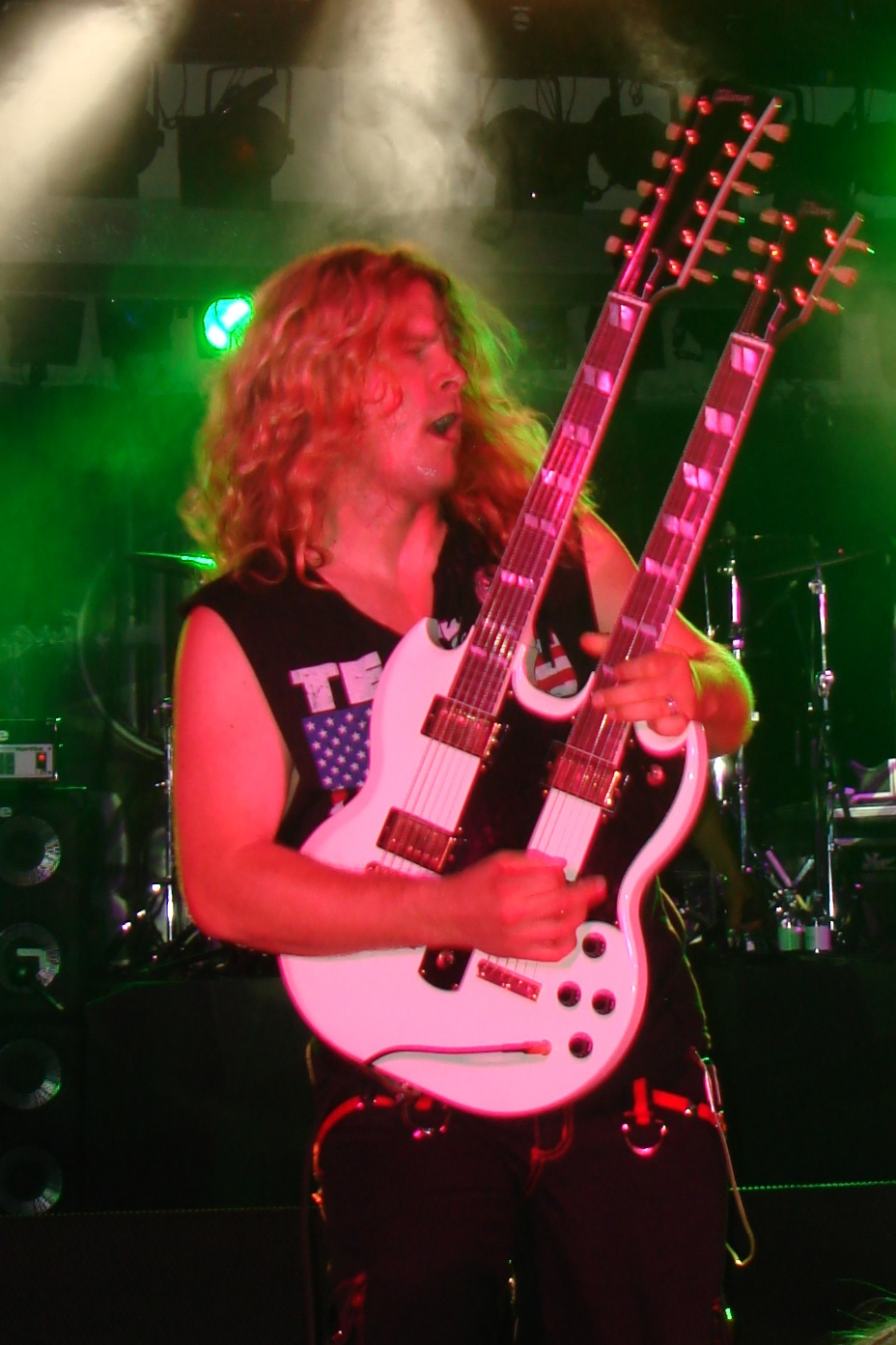
Hannon with Tesla in 2007

In 1981, a 15-year-old Hannon co-founded the band Earthshaker that evolved into City Kidd with bassist Brian Wheat in Sacramento, which later became Tesla in 1984 after adding vocalist Jeff Keith, guitarist Tommy Skeoch and drummer Troy Luccketta. The band adopted the name Tesla to avoid confusion with another band named City Kidd. Their debut album, Mechanical Resonance (1986), featured hit singles "Modern Day Cowboy" and a cover of "Little Suzi," establishing Tesla during the 1980s hair metal era, although the band resisted the glam metal label. Their second album, The Great Radio Controversy (1989), peaked at No. 18 on the Billboard 200 and included the top-ten single "Love Song," co-written by Hannon.

Hannon's guitar work, characterized by a bluesy, song-oriented style influenced by artists like Thin Lizzy, Jimmy Page and Dickey Betts, complemented Skeoch's playing, avoiding 1980s metal clichés like excessive shredding. Tesla's 1990 live album, Five Man Acoustical Jam, pioneered the acoustic "unplugged" trend, featuring acoustic versions of hits like "Love Song" and "Modern Day Cowboy." After Tesla's initial breakup in 1996, Hannon formed the band Moon Dog Mane, releasing an album in 1998. Tesla reformed in 2000 with Hannon remaining a core member, contributing to albums and tours.

=== Solo career and Frank Hannon Band ===
Hannon launched his solo career with the 2005 album Guitarz from Marz and has since released several albums, including Gypsy Highway (2010), World Peace, and the From One Place to Another series. His solo work often reflects influences from folk artists like Bob Dylan and John Denver. In 2025, Hannon announced the release of Reflections, an all-guitar instrumental album featuring tracks like "Walk in the Rain," "Into the Blue," and "Joy and Pain," recorded using his cell phone to capture raw, emotional performances.

Hannon formed the Frank Hannon Band with various musicians. The band performed at events like the Wounded Warriors Project benefit in 2010–2011 and released the album Six String Soldiers (2012), collaborating with artists like Dickey Betts and Pat Travers. Hannon also founded RedHawk Records to support his solo projects and mentor young artists.

=== Other projects ===
Hannon has collaborated with numerous artists, including Lynyrd Skynyrd, Def Leppard, Night Ranger, and Y&T, and performed with the Allman Family Revival tour alongside Devon Allman and Duane Betts. He hosts The FAR OUT! Podcast, launched in 2019, discussing music and his career. In 2020, Gibson created the Frank Hannon "Love Dove" signature acoustic guitar, inspired by the intro to Tesla's "Love Song."

== Musical style and equipment ==
Hannon's guitar style blends blues, rock, and acoustic elements, drawing from influences like Peter Frampton, Michael Schenker, and Dickey Betts. He prioritizes melodic, song-driven solos over technical shredding, using minor pentatonic and blues scales. His gear includes Gibson guitars, notably a 1996 Cherry SG Standard, ES-335, Les Paul Goldtops, and a double-neck EDS-1275, as well as a Japanese Fender Telecaster for country-inspired tracks. Hannon uses modified Hiwatt Custom 100 amplifiers and effects like the ZVEX Octane3 fuzzbox, Boss Flanger, and VOX wah-wah.

== Personal life ==
Hannon has been married to Christy Betts, daughter of Allman Brothers Band guitarist Dickey Betts, for 23 years as of 2024 and they resided in Sarasota County, Florida for several years before returning home to Northern California in 2025. His hobbies include working with horses, martial arts and songwriting. He has a son Alex, also a guitarist who currently plays for slam death metal band Boltcutter. In 2024, Hannon temporarily stepped away from Tesla to attend to family matters related to Dickey Betts' health, with Sammy Boller filling in.

== Discography ==
=== With Tesla ===
- Mechanical Resonance (1986)
- The Great Radio Controversy (1989)
- Five Man Acoustical Jam (1990)
- Psychotic Supper (1991)
- Bust a Nut (1994)
- And others

=== Solo albums ===
- Guitarz from Marz (2005)
- Gypsy Highway (2010)
- Six String Soldiers (2012, with Frank Hannon Band)
- World Peace (unknown release date)
- From One Place to Another, Vol. 1 & 2 (unknown release dates)
- Reflections (2025)
