= Replugged Live =

Live album by Tesla
- Released: September 11, 2001
- Recorded: 2001 Replugged North American tour
- Genres: Hard rock; blues rock
- Label: Sanctuary Records

Tesla chronology
Time's Makin' Changes – The Best of Tesla (1995)	Replugged Live (2001)	Into the Now (2004)

Alternative cover
- Standing Room Only cover art

Professional ratings
Review scores
Source	Rating
AllMusic	4/5 stars

Replugged Live is the second live album by American rock band Tesla. Tesla recorded the first half of their 12-month 2001 Replugged Reunion Tour. Recording started in Detroit, Michigan. A fan poll was set up on the band's website to see what tracks the fans would like to see on the double live album. Professional music photographer Gino Carlini was brought on to the tour to photograph the album cover and packaging. The cover image is from their show at The Pageant theater in St. Louis, Missouri. A shortened version of the album called Standing Room Only was released on March 5, 2002.

== Track listing ==
Disc One:

1. "Cumin' Atcha Live" (Frank Hannon, Jeff Keith, Brian Wheat) – 6:58
2. "EZ Come EZ Go" (Hannon, Keith, Troy Luccketta, Tommy Skeoch, Wheat) – 3:44
3. "Hang Tough" (Hannon, Keith, Skeoch, Wheat) – 4:49
4. "Gettin' Better" (Hannon, Keith) – 3:56
5. "The Way It Is" (Hannon, Keith, Luccketta, Skeoch) – 6:17
6. "Song and Emotion" (Michael Barbiero, Hannon, Keith, Skeoch) – 6:35
7. "Changes" (Hannon, Keith, Luccketta, Skeoch, Wheat) – 5:06
8. "Call It What You Want" (Barbiero, Keith, Wheat) – 4:33
9. "Lazy Days, Crazy Nights" (Keith, Skeoch) – 4:27
10. "We're No Good Together" (Hannon, Keith, Luccketta) – 5:54

Disc Two:

1. "Heaven's Trail [No Way Out]" (Keith, Skeoch) – 5:28
2. "Mama's Fool" (Hannon, Keith) – 7:02
3. "Freedom Slaves" (Keith, Hannon, Skeoch, Wheat) – 7:39
4. "Signs" (Les Emmerson) – 4:09
5. "Little Suzi" (Jim Diamond, Tony Hymas) – 4:08
6. "What You Give" (Keith, Hannon) – 7:07
7. "Summer's Day" (Hannon) – 3:01
8. "Love Song" (Hannon, Keith) – 6:57
9. "Edison's Medicine" (Barbiero, Hannon, Keith, Skeoch, Wheat) – 5:13
10. "Modern Day Cowboy" (Hannon, Keith, Skeoch) – 6:26

Standing Room Only:

1. Cumin' Atcha Live
2. Hang Tough
3. Gettin' Better
4. The Way It Is
5. Song & Emotion
6. Heaven's Trail (No Way Out)
7. Mama's Fool
8. Freedom Slaves
9. Signs
10. Little Suzie
11. What You Give
12. Love Song
13. Modern Day Cowboy

== Charts ==
Chart (2001)	Peak position
Billboard Top Internet Albums	21
