= Moon Dog Mane =

American rock band

- Origin: Tampa, Florida, U.S.
- Genres: Southern rock, post-grunge
- Years active: 1998–2000
- Label: Eureka Records
- Past members: Frank Hannon; Brodie Stewart; Kevin Hampton; Chris Martinez; Joel Krueger; Cortney DeAugustine; Kris Gustofson

Moon Dog Mane was an American rock band from Sacramento, California, led by Tesla guitarist Frank Hannon. The band released one album in 1998 entitled Turn It Up, which spawned two minor hits on US rock radio. The song "Turn It Up" peaked at number 36 on Billboard's Mainstream Rock chart in 1998, and "I Believe" peaked at number 38 in 1999. The band broke up in 2000.

== Members ==
- Brodie Stewart – vocals
- Frank Hannon – guitar
- Kevin Hampton – guitar
- Chris Martinez – keyboards
- Joel Krueger – bass
- Cortney DeAugustine – drums

== Discography ==
- 1998: Turn It Up
