= Coming of Age (Five Man Electrical Band album) =

Studio album by Five Man Electrical Band
- Released: January 1972
- Recorded: Sound City
- Genre: Rock
- Label: Lionel LRS-1101 (MGM)
- Producer: Dallas Smith

Five Man Electrical Band chronology
Good-byes and Butterflies (1970)	Coming of Age (1972)	Sweet Paradise (1973)

Coming of Age is a studio album by the Canadian rock band the Five Man Electrical Band. It includes their hit, "Absolutely Right". As of 2022, the album has not yet been released on compact disc.

== Reception ==
The album received a positive critical reception upon its release. Billboard said, "This second album from The Five Man Electrical Band should further establish them as one of the most capable new groups to have emerged during the past year." They noted that the "Subjects drawn on for inspiration include unrequited love ('Country Girl'), communication barriers ('Friends & Family'), and growing up ('Coming of Age ')." Record World stated that the band "include the kind of delicacy on this album that might not be expected from the 'Signs' - 'Absolutely Right' makers. But there is also plenty of that tough music and thinking to appeal to the growing fanship." The publication also believed that the "album has that home-grown, home-made look, but doesn't need it."

== Chart performance ==
The album debuted on Billboard's Top LP's chart in the issue dated February 12, 1972, peaking at No. 199 during a two-week run on the chart.

== Track listing ==
Side one
No.	Title	Length
1.	"Coming of Age"	8:29
2.	"Find the One"	3:48
3.	"Absolutely Right"	2:14
4.	"Country Girl": "Country Girl of Mine"; "The Devil and Miss Lucy"; "She Used to Be My Woman""	10:34

Side two
No.	Title	Length
5.	"Julianna"	3:55
6.	"Friends & Family"	4:55
7.	"Isn't It a Long Hard Road"	3:01
8.	"Me & Harley Davidson"	3:20
9.	"Whole Lotta Heavy (Reprise)"	2:26

== Personnel ==
- Les Emmerson – guitars, synthesizer, vocals
- Ted Gerow – keyboards, moog synthesizer, vocals
- Brian Rading – bass, vocals
- Mike Bell – drums, vocals
- Rick Bell – percussion, vocals
