= Hang Tough (disambiguation) =

"Hang Tough" is a 1989 song by the band Tesla, from their album, The Great Radio Controversy.

Hang Tough may also refer to:

- "Hang Tough", a song by the band Fluke on the 2003 album Puppy
- Hang Tough, an event on the 1995 Australian series Gladiators

== See also ==
- Hangin' Tough, a 1988 New Kids on the Block album
  - "Hangin' Tough" (song), a song from the album
- Hangin' Tough (Waylon Jennings album), 1987
