= Five Man Acoustical Jam =

Live album by Tesla
- Released: November 9, 1990
- Recorded: July 2, 1990
- Venues: Trocadero Theatre in Philadelphia, Pennsylvania, U.S.
- Genre: Acoustic rock
- Length: 67:34
- Label: Geffen

Tesla chronology
The Great Radio Controversy (1989)	Five Man Acoustical Jam (1990)	Psychotic Supper (1991)

Singles from Five Man Acoustical Jam
- 1. "Signs" Released: December 1990; 2. "Paradise" Released: 1991

Professional ratings
Review scores
Source	Rating
AllMusic	3.5/5 stars
Entertainment Weekly	A
Q	4/5 stars

Five Man Acoustical Jam is a live album recorded at the Trocadero Theatre in Philadelphia and released in 1990 by the band Tesla, using acoustic guitars instead of the electric guitars for which pop-metal bands such as Tesla are traditionally known.

The biggest hit from the album was the song "Signs", a cover version originally from the band Five Man Electrical Band, who also had a hit with the song. Other songs included "Love Song" and "The Way It Is" (hits from their previous album The Great Radio Controversy) and covers of The Rolling Stones' "Mother's Little Helper", Creedence Clearwater Revival's "Lodi", and The Beatles' "We Can Work It Out".

== Background and recording ==
Tesla was originally reticent to perform an all-acoustic show. They had performed an acoustic version of their hit "Love Song" at the 1990 Bammy Awards, a local music awards show in the San Francisco Bay Area sponsored by the indie music publication BAM. The performance was so well received, that the band's co-manager Peter Mensch tried to get the band to perform an all-acoustic set during a lull in their touring schedule, while they were opening for Mötley Crüe on their 1990 Dr. Feelgood tour. When Mensch brought up the idea, bassist Brian Wheat replied "Fuck no! We’re a hard rock band, man!", though Mensch goaded them into developing a fully acoustic set by challenging their musical skill, claiming they were unable to pull it off.

The band developed a 90-minute set entirely performed on acoustic instruments, and after three days of rehearsal, debuted the set over two shows at Slim's in San Francisco just before the launch of the Mötley Crüe tour. Given the strength of the two shows, four additional dates were booked during gaps in the tour, and the July 2 show at the Trocadero Theatre in Philadelphia, was selected for recording for a potential live album, at Wheat's suggestion. The tapes from the show sat unused for two months, until a live performance of "Signs", recorded at WAAF in Boston, had become a big hit at that station The other co-manager Cliff Burnstein convinced Geffen Records to release the live recordings from the Trocadero show. Initially envisioned as an EP, the band convinced Geffen to release it as a full LP.

In reviewing the tapes, Wheat's acoustic bass playing did not record well, so he re-recorded his parts in the studio, the only overdub work done on the original live recordings. It was decided to title the album Five Man Acoustical Jam in honor of the Five Man Electrical Band, who had originally performed the song "Signs" that Tesla covered on the album. The album was released on November 9, 1990.

== Track listing ==
No.	Title	Writer(s)	Original artist	Length
1.	"Comin' Atcha Live/Truckin'"	Tesla / Garcia, Weir, Lesh, Hunter	Original song / Grateful Dead	7:23
2.	"Heaven's Trail (No Way Out)"	Keith, Skeoch		4:41
3.	"The Way It Is"	Hannon, Keith, Luccketta, Skeoch		6:35
4.	"We Can Work It Out"	Lennon, McCartney	The Beatles	2:09
5.	"Signs"	Emmerson	Five Man Electrical Band	3:15
6.	"Gettin' Better"	Hannon, Keith		3:30
7.	"Before My Eyes"	Hannon, Keith, Luccketta, Skeoch		6:06
8.	"Paradise"	Hannon, Keith, Wheat		5:49
9.	"Lodi"	Fogerty	Creedence Clearwater Revival	2:51
10.	"Mother's Little Helper"	Jagger, Richards	The Rolling Stones	3:47
11.	"Modern Day Cowboy"	Hannon, Keith, Skeoch		6:09
12.	"Love Song"	Hannon, Keith		9:54
13.	"Tommy's Down Home"	Skeoch		2:04
14.	"Down Fo' Boogie"	Keith, Skeoch		3:21
Total length:				67:34

== Personnel ==
Tesla

- Jeff Keith – vocals, tambourine
- Tommy Skeoch – 6 & 12-string guitars, backing vocals
- Frank Hannon – 6-string & electric guitar, bottleneck guitar, blues harp, piano, organ, backing vocals
- Brian Wheat – hofner bass, piano, backing vocals
- Troy Luccketta – drums, percussion

Production

- Dan McClendon - engineer, producer
- Mike Beyer - engineer
- David Hewitt - engineer

== Charts ==
Chart (1990)	Peak position
Australian Albums (ARIA)	145
Canada Top Albums/CDs (RPM)	63
Finnish Albums (The Official Finnish Charts)	26
Japanese Albums (Oricon)	65
UK Albums (Official Charts)	59
US Billboard 200	12

== Certifications ==
Region	Certification	Certified units/sales
Canada (Music Canada)	Gold	50,000^{^}
United States (RIAA)	Platinum	1,000,000^{^}
^{^} Shipments figures based on certification alone.
