= Show Some Emotion =

Show Some Emotion may refer to:

- Show Some Emotion (album), a 1977 album by Joan Armatrading
  - "Show Some Emotion", the album's title track
- "Show Some Emotion", a 1979 song by The Cooper Brothers
- "Show Some Emotion", a 1985 song by Hoodoo Gurus
- "Show Some Emotion", a 1988 song by Underworld
- "Show Some Emotion", a 1992 song by Celine Dion from Celine Dion
- "Show Some Emotion", a 1995 song by Aaron Neville
