= Good-byes and Butterflies =

Studio album by Five Man Electrical Band
- Released: 1970, 1971
- Genre: Rock
- Label: Lionel Records LRS-1100; MGM Records
- Producer: Dallas Smith

Five Man Electrical Band chronology
Five Man Electrical Band (1969)	Good-byes and Butterflies (1970)	Coming of Age (1972)

Good-byes and Butterflies is a studio album by Canadian rock band the Five Man Electrical Band. The album includes the band's biggest hit, "Signs," which peaked at #3 on the Billboard Hot 100. The album was released in 1970, and then re-released in 1971 with different cover art.

== Chart performance ==
The album reached No. 52 in the Canadian RPM Magazine charts on October 2, 1971. It debuted on Billboard magazine's Top LP's chart in the issue dated July 31, 1971, peaking at No. 148 during a nine-week run on the chart. The album debuted on Cashbox magazine's Top 100 Albums chart in the issue dated July 1, 1971, peaking at No. 141 during a six-week run on the chart.

== Track listing ==
All songs written by Les Emmerson.

1. "Signs" - 4:05
2. "Safe & Sound (With Jesus)" - 3:30
3. "Dance of the Swamp Woman" - 3:51
4. "(You and I) Butterfly" - 4:52
5. "Hello Melinda Goodbye" - 3:15
6. "Moonshine (Friend Of Mine)" - 2:10
7. "Forever Together" - 2:35
8. "Mama's Baby Child" - 3:32
9. "The Man with the Horse and Wagon" - 4:45
10. "All Is Right (With The World)" - 3:45
11. "Variations on a Theme of Lepidoptera" - 2:45

== Personnel ==
- Les Emmerson - guitars, lead vocals (1, 5–8, 10, 11)
- Ted Gerow - organ, piano
- Brian Rading - bass
- Mike Bell - drums, lead vocals (9)
- Rick Bell - percussion, lead vocals (2–4)

== Charts ==
Chart peaks for Good-byes and Butterflies
Chart (1971)	Peak position
CAN RPM Top 100 Albums	52
US Billboard Top LP's	148
US Cashbox Top 100 Albums	141
