= The Way It Is (Tesla song) =

1990 single by Tesla

Single by Tesla

from the album The Great Radio Controversy
- Released: March 1990
- Recorded: 1988
- Genre: Pop metal; southern rock
- Length: 5:14
- Label: Geffen
- Songwriters: Keith, Skeoch, Hannon, Troy Luccketta
- Producers: Steve Thompson and Michael Barbiero

Tesla singles chronology
| "Love Song" (1989) | "The Way It Is" (1990) | "Signs" (1990) |

"The Way It Is" is a song by American rock band Tesla from their 1989 album The Great Radio Controversy. When it was released as a single in March 1990 it peaked at number 55 on the Hot 100, and 13 on the Album Rock Tracks chart.

== Reception ==
In his review of The Great Radio Controversy, Steve Huey, writing for AllMusic, called this song along with Love Song and Heaven's Trail, "among their best, with melodies and riffs that aren't predictable, cookie-cutter product".

== Charts ==
| Chart (1990) | Peak position |
|---|---|
| US Billboard Hot 100 | 55 |
| US Mainstream Rock (Billboard) | 13 |
