= Better Off Without You =

Better Off Without You may refer to

- "Better Off Without You", 1990 song by Emmylou Harris from Brand New Dance (album)
- "Better Off Without You", song by Lonnie Gordon, written by Stock, Aitken, Waterman from If I Have to Stand Alone, covered by Hazell Dean
- "Better Off Without You", song by Pittsburgh band The Clarks from Let It Go
- "Better Off Without You", song by Tesla from Twisted Wires & the Acoustic Sessions
- "Better Off Without You", instrumental by jazz guitarist Terje Rypdal from Odyssey
- "Better Off Without You", 2020 song by Becky Hill & Shift K3Y
