= Guitarz from Marz =

Studio album by Frank Hannon
- Released: 2005
- Genre: Hard rock
- Length: 72:52
- Label: Frank Hannon Music
- Producer: Frank Hannon

Frank Hannon chronology
Guitarz from Marz (2005)	100 Proof Live! – Live at Constable Jack's (2010)

Guitarz from Marz is the debut studio album by Tesla guitarist Frank Hannon. It was released in 2005 through Frank Hannon Music.

== Production ==
The album was released independently and sold exclusively on Hannon's website. It was also sold during his 2006–2007 solo tour. The album was recorded in a small studio in Hannon's garage. The album is currently out of print with a possibility of re-recording it in the near future, since Hannon considered the album to be more along the lines of a demo recording than a proper album.

A digital version of the album is also available on Amazon.

== Track listing ==
All songs written by Frank Hannon, except as noted below:.

1. "Diamondz in the Sky" – 7:02
2. "Re-Evolution" – 7:07
3. "Guitarz from Marz" – 8:08
4. "Chain Reaction" – 4:54
5. "Stop the War" (Frank Hannon, Joel Krueger) – 6:54
6. "Angel" (Frank Hannon, Robbie Furiosi) – 5:39
7. "Eye of the Mind" – 7:47
8. "Touch of Magic" – 3:46
9. "De' la Luna Acoustica" – 1:59
10. "Electric Warriorz" – 6:16
11. "Funk It Up!" – 5:42
12. "Mobias Flip" – 3:50
13. "Hyperspace" – 3:54

== Personnel ==
- Frank Hannon – electric and acoustic guitars, lead vocals, synthesizers and lunacy
- Robbie Furiosi – drums, percussion, tympani, porch bells and lead vocal on "Angel"
- Joel Krueger – bass guitars and mellow vibes
