= Signs (Five Man Electrical Band song) =

1971 single by Five Man Electrical Band

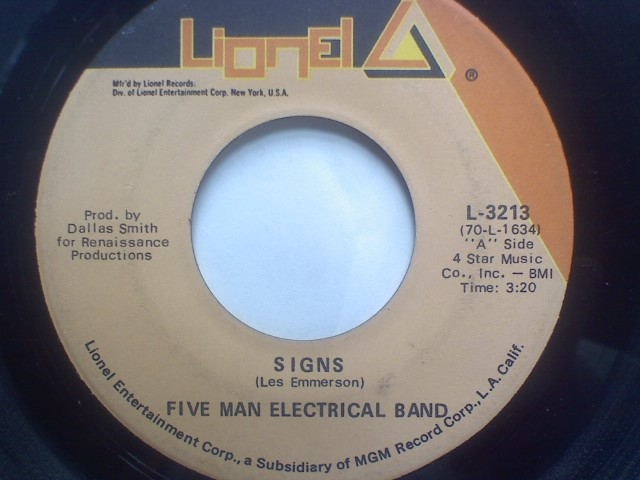

Single by Five Man Electrical Band

from the album Good-byes and Butterflies
- B-side: "Hello Melinda Goodbye"
- Released: May 1971
- Genre: Hard rock
- Length: 4:05 (album version); 3:20 (single version)
- Label: Lionel Records
- Songwriter: Les Emmerson
- Producer: Dallas Smith

Five Man Electrical Band singles chronology
"Signs" (1971)	"Absolutely Right" (1971)

"Signs" is the best known song by the Canadian rock group Five Man Electrical Band. It was written by the band's frontman, Les Emmerson, as he was travelling Route 66 while returning to Los Angeles from Canada and noticed all of the big signs and billboards obscuring his view of the natural scenery. The song popularized the relatively unknown band, who recorded it for their true first album, Good-byes and Butterflies, in 1970. Their actual first LP Five Man Electrical Band had begun as a Staccatos album with Brian Rading, the band's bassist suggesting the band's new name from the song title.

"Signs" was originally a 1970 B-side to the relatively unsuccessful single "Hello Melinda Goodbye" (#55 Canada), first put out on MGM Records. Re-released on Lionel Records in 1971 as the A-side, "Signs" reached No. 4 in Canada and No. 3 on the US Billboard Hot 100 chart. Billboard ranked it as the No. 24 song for 1971. It became a gold record. In Canada, RPM Magazine ranked it at No. 55, with Absolutely Right ranked No. 49.

Some radio edits have omitted the instrumental introduction and shortened the instrumental coda for airplay, due to time constraints.

The song was sampled in 2004 by British DJ Fatboy Slim for the track Don’t Let The Man Get You Down.

== Composition ==
The song was written by Les Emmerson when he was road-tripping on Route 66 in California, and noticed the beautiful scenery was obscured by many billboards.

The song's narrator describes four instances of encountering signs that anger or concern him, as follows:

- A notice that "long-haired freaky people need not apply" for a job opening. He stuffs his hair into his hat in order to get an interview, then contemptuously reveals it once he has been offered the job.
- A sign outside a house warning that trespassers will be shot on sight. He climbs onto the perimeter fence and berates the owners for keeping people out and fencing in the land's natural beauty.
- Being told to leave a restaurant because he does not meet its dress code or have a membership card, both of which are displayed on a sign.
- A sign inviting people to worship at a church. When an offering is taken up at the end of the service, he makes a sign telling God that he is doing well, as he has no money to contribute.

== Chart performance ==
=== Weekly charts ===
Chart (1971)	Peak position
Australia (Go-Set)	5
Canadian RPM Top Singles	4
US Billboard Hot 100	3
US Cash Box Top 100	7

=== Year-end charts ===
Chart (1971)	Rank
Australia	29
Canada	55
US Billboard Hot 100	24
US Cash Box Top 100	17

== Tesla version ==
"Signs"
- Cover for the 7" single

Single by Tesla

from the album Five Man Acoustical Jam
- Released: November 1990
- Recorded: July 2, 1990
- Venue: Trocadero Theatre, Philadelphia, PA
- Genre: Acoustic rock
- Length: 3:15
- Label: Geffen
- Songwriter: Les Emmerson
- Producer: Dan McClendon

Tesla singles chronology
"Love Song" (1989)	"Signs" (1990)	"The Way It Is" (1991)

"Signs" was covered and recorded live by Tesla for their Five Man Acoustical Jam album in 1990, peaking at number 8 on the Pop charts. The album version of the cover had some minor changes to the lyrics: the line "blockin' out the scenery" was changed to "fuckin' up the scenery," and "made up my own little sign" was changed to "made up my own fuckin' sign," whilst the single version retained the original lyrics for radio airplay. A studio version recorded in 2007, which appeared on the EP A Peace of Time, using the original lyrics.

=== Track listings ===
7" single

Side A
No.	Title	Length
1.	"Signs" (Clean Version)	3:11

Side B
No.	Title	Length
1.	"Down Fo' Boogie" (LP Version)	3:21

12" single

Side A
No.	Title	Length
1.	"Signs" (LP Version)	3:15

Side B
No.	Title	Length
1.	"Little Suzi" (Live Acoustic Version)	3:53
2.	"Down Fo' Boogie" (LP Version)	3:21

CD single

No.	Title	Length
1.	"Signs" (Clean Version)	3:11
2.	"Down Fo' Boogie" (Single Version)	3:21
3.	"Little Suzi" (Live Acoustic Version)	3:53

=== Chart performance ===
Chart (1990−1991)	Peak position
Australia (ARIA)	155
Canada RPM Top Singles	72
US Hot 100 (Billboard)	8
US Mainstream Rock (Billboard)	2
UK Singles (Official Charts Company)	70

Year-end chart (1991)	Position
US Top Pop Singles (Billboard)	73
