= Dick Cooper =

- CNE Bandshell

Background information
- Also known as: Coop
- Born: Richard Cooper
- Origin: Ottawa, Ontario, Canada
- Genre: Country rock
- Occupations: Songwriter, Guitarist, Author, Producer
- Instrument: Guitar
- Member of: The Cooper Brothers

Richard Cooper is a Canadian musician and writer based in Ottawa, Ontario.

== 1970s ==
A founding member of the popular 1970s Canadian Southern rock band The Cooper Brothers, he toured extensively throughout North America and helped the band achieve several hits under the Capricorn Records label, including a number of songs which charted on The Billboard Hot 100.

== 1980s ==
When the band went their separate ways in 1983, Dick began working as a children's television writer (working under the name Richard Cooper) and over the next few years scripted several shows for Nickelodeon including You Can't Do That On Television (made at CJOH-TV in Ottawa) and Turkey T.V., both Roger Price creations. (The Cooper Brothers had previously performed "I'll Know Her When I See Her" on YCDTOTV's short-lived CTV network spinoff, Whatever Turns You On, in 1979.)

While working at CJOH in 1986, Cooper also created and developed his first original series entitled Highschool Confidential. Cooper would write and produce 21 episodes of the teen variety series, and the show was later syndicated in the U.S. and Canada, winning the International Iris Award at NATPE in 1987.

In 1988, Cooper followed up Highschool Confidential by producing and directing 13 episodes of the television series Denim Blues, a half-hour teen drama which was subsequently syndicated in both Canada and Japan. The show would also mark the acting debut of Golden Globe Winner Sandra Oh as well as Tyley Ross, of the popular singing ensemble the East Village Opera Company. The series was also presented with the Canadian Association of Broadcasters Gold Ribbon Award in 1989.

== 1990s ==
In 1990, Cooper left CJOH to pursue a freelance career as a writer, director and producer. During this time, he continued to work as a story editor, as well as teaching screenwriting at the Ottawa based Algonquin College and the Summer Institute of Film and Television. Cooper also wrote and scored the soundtracks for several industrial films, television shows and documentaries.

In 1997, Cooper was hired on as the Creative Director of Ottawa based video game developer Artech Studios. Over the next ten years, Cooper would work on over 50 best-selling video game titles including: Q*bert, Star Wars Monopoly, Jeopardy!, Wheel Of Fortune, Family Feud, Stanley, Trivial Pursuit Unhinged and Lord of the Rings Trivial Pursuit; working with the likes of Andy Serkis, Whoopi Goldberg, Alex Trebek, Vanna White, John O'Hurley and John Cleese.

== 2000s ==
In 2006, Cooper once again become involved with the Cooper Brothers when the band reformed after twenty years of separation to release a "Best Of" CD under the EMI Pacemaker label.

Dick left Artech Studios in 2007 when his first novel Jukebox, published by Rain Books, was released.

Since then he has gone back to freelance writing, and written several episodes of Forensic Factor (EPI Productions) which airs on the Discovery Channel.

== 2010s ==
In February 2010, a new Cooper Brothers album entitled In From the Cold was released. The album features a number of guest artists including Blue Rodeo's Jim Cuddy, Delbert McClinton, and Chuck Leavell.

In 2012, Jukebox was re-published by General Store Publishing. That same year, Dick started teaching song writing and performance at Algonquin College in Ottawa in their Introduction to Music Industry Arts program.

In June 2013, the Cooper Brothers released a new CD entitled Southbound, produced by Colin Cripps (Blue Rodeo, Crash Vegas). The album features eleven Richard Cooper penned tracks. The Cooper Brothers released the album Radio Silence in 2017.

Cooper co-wrote five songs on JW-Jones's High Temperature, which received 2017 best self–released CD AWARD - Blues Foundation's International Blues Challenge in Memphis.

== 2020s ==
Cooper continues with his songwriting and teaching.

Co-wrote nine songs for Set the Record by HOROJO Trio, winner of the 2020 Memphis International Blues Challenge. Co-wrote/co-produced – Jeff Rogers album DREAM JOB for release October 2023. He co-wrote eight songs on the JW-Jones 2023 album Everything Now.

Wrote and produced the album A Million Pieces by Sherri Harding (Instant Replay Music, 2023) which they recorded in Muscle Shoals, Alabama, with the Muscle Shoals Horns and the last remaining "Swamper", David Hood.
