= Edison's Medicine =

1991 single by Tesla

Single by Tesla

from the album Psychotic Supper
- Released: 1991
- Recorded: 1991
- Genre: Hard rock, glam metal
- Songwriters: Keith, Barbiero, Hannon, Skeoch, Wheat

Tesla singles chronology
| "Call It What You Want" (1991) | "Edison's Medicine" (1991) | "Paradise" (1991) |

Edison's Medicine is a song by American hard rock band Tesla that was released as a single in 1991 from their third studio album Psychotic Supper. The song peaked at No. 20 on Billboard's Mainstream Rock chart.

The song is about Nikola Tesla's rivalry with Thomas Edison.

== Charts ==
| Chart (1991) | Peak position |
|---|---|
| U.S. Billboard Mainstream Rock | 20 |
