= Heaven's Trail (No Way Out) =

Single by Tesla

from the album The Great Radio Controversy
- Released: January 1989
- Recorded: 1988
- Studio: Bearsville Studios, Bearsville, New York
- Genre: Pop metal
- Length: 4:41
- Label: Geffen
- Songwriter(s): Jeff Keith; Tommy Skeoch
- Producer(s): Steve Thompson; Michael Barbiero

Tesla singles chronology
"Little Suzi" (1987)	"Heaven's Trail (No Way Out)" (1989)	"Hang Tough" (1989)

"Heaven's Trail (No Way Out)" is a song by American rock band Tesla. The song was released as the lead single from the group's second studio album, The Great Radio Controversy. The song peaked at #13 on the Billboard Mainstream Rock Songs chart on March 18, 1989.

Along with "Love Song" and "What You Give", "Heaven's Trail (No Way Out)" is considered to be one of the band's signature songs. The song's intro and outro features a slide guitar.

== Reception ==
In his review of the album, AllMusic's Steve Huey called "Heaven's Trail (No Way Out)" one of Tesla's best songs. The song was called one of the 50 Metal Songs That Defined 1989 by Loudwire in 2019.

== Track listing ==
No.	Title	Length
1.	"Heaven's Trail (No Way Out)" (LP version)	4:41

== Personnel ==
- Jeff Keith – lead vocals
- Tommy Skeoch – lead guitar, backing vocals
- Frank Hannon – rhythm guitar, slide guitar
- Brian Wheat – bass
- Troy Luccketta – drums

== Charts ==
Chart (1989)	Peak position
US Mainstream Rock (Billboard)	13
