= Five Man Electrical Band =

Canadian rock band

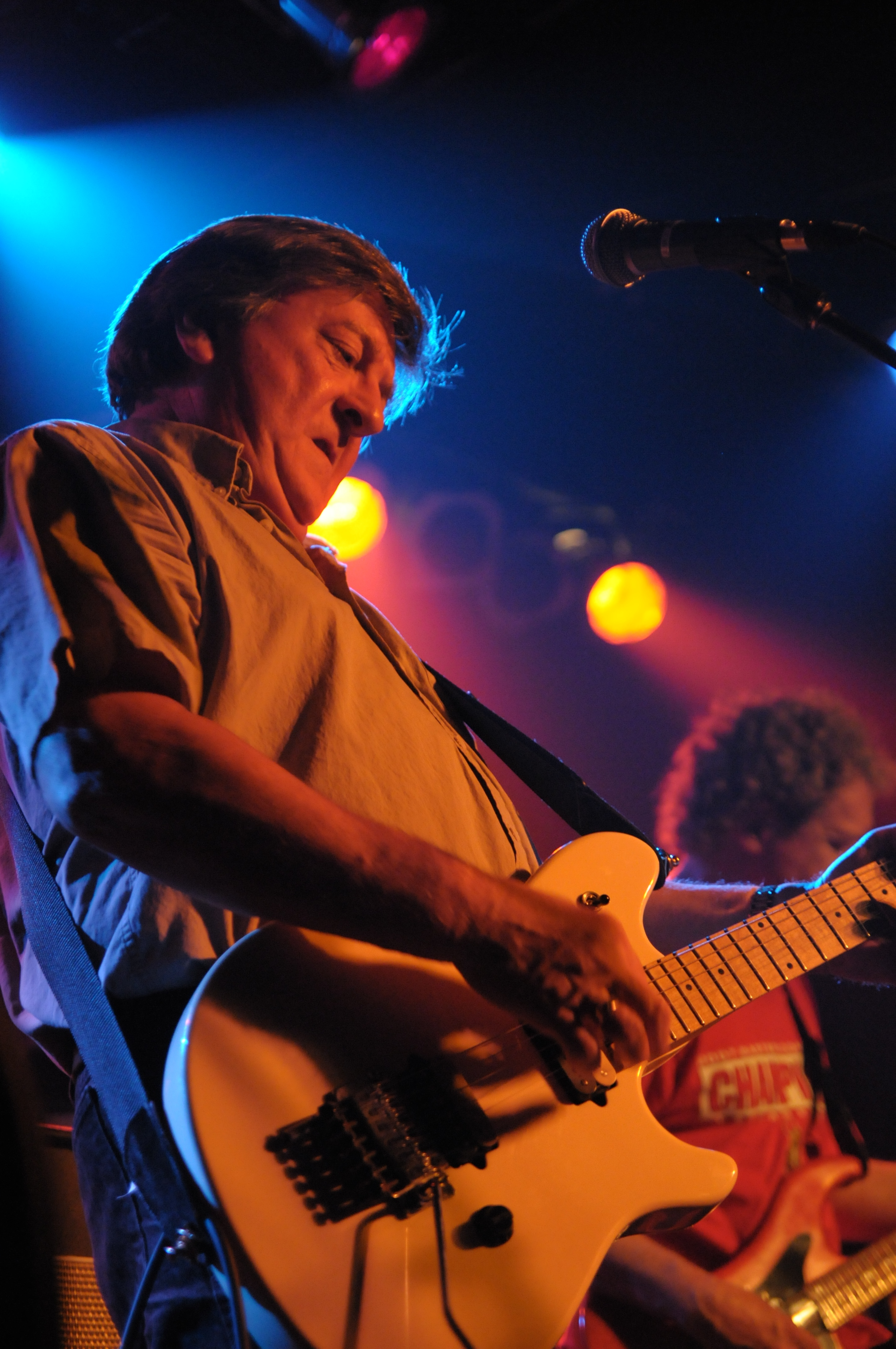
- Les Emmerson in 2008

Background information
- Also known as: The Staccatos (1963–1968)
- Origin: Ottawa, Ontario, Canada
- Genres: Rock, psychedelic rock
- Years active: 1963–1975, 1986–present
- Labels: Quality, Capitol, Lionel, MGM
- Members: Michael Crepin; Steve Hollingworth; Rick Smithers; Skyler Radmore; Wes Reed; Brian Sim; Alan Wilmore
- Past members: Ted Gerow; Dean Hagopian; Vern Craig; Brian Rading (died 2016); Michael "Mike Bell" Belanger; Rick "Bell" Belanger; Les Emmerson (died 2021)
- Website: fivemanelectricalband.ca

The Five Man Electrical Band (known as The Staccatos from 1963 to 1968) is a Canadian rock band from Ottawa, Ontario. They had many hits in Canada, including the top 10 entries "Half Past Midnight" (1967) (as The Staccatos), "Absolutely Right" (1971) and "I'm a Stranger Here" (1972). Internationally, they are best known for their 1971 hit single "Signs".

== History ==
=== Initial success as The Staccatos (1963–1968) ===
The band The Staccatos was formed in Ottawa in 1963. It initially included singer Dean Hagopian, guitarist Vern Craig, bass player Brian Rading, and singer/drummer Rick Bell (born Rick Belanger). Hagopian left after about a year and was replaced by vocalist and guitarist Les Emmerson, who would become the band's prime songwriter, while Bell and Emmerson split lead vocal duties.

The Staccatos made their debut as a recording act in 1965, with their early singles being written by Craig and Emmerson. After releasing a non-charting single on a small independent label, the group signed to Capitol Records of Canada, and their second single, "Small Town Girl", made it into the Canadian top 20. Several follow-ups also cracked the top 40, and The Staccatos were rising stars in their native country. Their debut album, Initially, came out in 1966 and featured their hits to that point as well as several new recordings.

In the summer of 1966, Mike Bell (Rick's brother) joined the group as a second drummer and third vocalist. Shortly thereafter, the group had their biggest hit to date with "Half Past Midnight", which rose to No. 8 on the Canadian charts. It was the second Staccatos single written solely by Emmerson, who by this point was writing most of the band's original material. Also in 1968, The Staccatos issued a joint album, A Wild Pair, with The Guess Who, each band taking up one side of the LP.

The Staccatos follow-ups to "Half Past Midnight" did not meet with as much success in Canada. In the US, the situation was worse – the band's singles (released by Capitol and Tower) failed to chart at all.

Looking for a new direction, at the end of 1968, Ted Gerow was added to the line-up on keyboards, and shortly thereafter, Vern Craig left.

Around the same time, while recording their second full album, the band was prompted to change their name by producer Nick Venet's comment that the name The Staccatos sounded "dated". After discussing various possibilities, bassist Rading seized upon a song Emmerson had written called "Five Man Electrical Band", claiming it's exactly what the group was. The band's name was duly changed: Five Man Electrical Band released their self-titled album in early 1969.

=== Rebirth as Five Man Electrical Band (1969–1975) ===
The group's new single "It Never Rains On Maple Lane" with B side "Private Train" was a mild success in Canada; the A-side appeared at No. 67 on the charts, but after two weeks on the charts the single was flipped over and B-side "Private Train" made it into the top 40, peaking at No. 37. The album, meanwhile, contained a mixture of new material and older recordings originally released under the Staccatos name (including "Half Past Midnight") and was similarly successful in Canada. But when follow-up singles failed to chart, the band ended their relationship with Capitol, at the end of 1969, and moved back to Ottawa from Los Angeles.

They eventually decided to try it again back in L.A. and hooked up with Dallas Smith and his company Renaissance Productions, who was partnered with Canopy, a production company co-owned by writer Jimmy Webb. The band then set about recording some demos, though nothing was released right away.

By November 1969, Canopy had signed a deal with MGM Records, whose parent company, Metro-Goldwyn-Mayer, placed one of the songs recorded, "Moonshine (Friend Of Mine)", in a movie, The Moonshine War, that featured Alan Alda.

MGM then released the group's 1970 album Good-byes and Butterflies, which created a minor controversy with a front cover picture that featured a marijuana plant; the album was withdrawn and subsequently reissued with a new cover.

Next came the single "Hello Melinda, Goodbye" with "Signs" on the B side. But after the single failed, MGM dumped the band, who once again returned to Ottawa.

By this time, Dallas Smith had met Clive Fox, who had a connection to Lionel, LLC, makers of model railroading equipment, who was forming a record label in conjunction with them, Lionel Records (later called Lion Records). In February 1971, MGM assigned all rights to the group over to the Lionel Entertainment Corporation. And in May 1971, Lionel re-released the album Good-byes and Butterflies and the song "Signs", now on the A side.

Disc jockeys and the public immediately took to "Signs"; it reached No. 4 in Canada, No. 3 on the U.S. Billboard Hot 100, and went to No. 1 in Australia for nearly two months. It sold over one million copies and was awarded a gold disc by the R.I.A.A. in August 1971.

In the next few years a number of charting singles were released: "Absolutely Right" (No.3 in Canada, 26 in the U.S.), "Money Back Guarantee" (No. 17 in Canada, 72 in the U.S.), "Werewolf" (No. 28 in Canada, 64 in the U.S.) and a few others, all written by Emmerson. Outside of Canada the band continued with a steady flow of concert dates.

In January 1972, the band issued Coming Of Age, their third album as Five Man Electrical Band. But Emmerson, who was more interested in recording in the studio than in playing live, also established a parallel solo career in 1972.

Mike Bell, now going by his birth name of Michael Belanger, left the group partway through the recording of their 1973 album Sweet Paradise and bassist Brian Rading left just as the album was being finished. Bassist Joe LaManno and drummer John Raines were brought in to finish up the record, which produced several hit singles, including "I'm A Stranger Here", their highest-ever charting hit in Canada (at No. 2, but it only managed No. 76 in the U.S.). Emmerson, Gerow and Rick Belanger attempted to keep things going with new players for a time, producing singles in 1974 and 1975, with minimal chart success outside of Canada.

Rick Belanger left the group in 1974, leaving Emmerson and Gerow as the only remaining permanent members of the ostensibly "Five Man" band. Shortly thereafter, when 1975's "Johnny Get A Gun" peaked at a lowly No. 69 in Canada, Emmerson and Gerow decided to disband the Five Man Electrical Band.

=== Reunions ===
During the mid-1970s, Emmerson continued to work as a solo artist and he and Brian Rading were part of a new group called Emmerson Electrical Band during the late 1970s. He also worked with an outfit called The Cooper Brothers in the 1970s and early 1980s.

In 1986, the Five Man Electrical Band reunited with all five original members: Les Emmerson, Brian Rading, Ted Gerow and Rick and Mike Belanger (joined by Vern Craig on the Staccatos numbers) for the Children's Wish Foundation of Canada charity fundraiser at the Ottawa Civic Centre. The Cooper Brothers and another band called Bolt Upright were also on the bill. This was supposed to have been a one time only deal, but the reformed band continued on, playing a series of concert and festival appearances each year after that.

Over the next thirty plus years, the band continued to make annual appearances, mostly in their native Canada. Rick Belanger left after playing the Canada Day 1997 Celebration in Ottawa on July 1 of that year. Steve Hollingworth (drums, percussion, vocals) replaced him in 1998. Wes Reed (percussion) joined up in 2001 and second guitarist Ross McRae was added in 2002 (succeeded by Brian Sim in 2007). Brian Rading retired in 2004, making way for Rick Smithers, while Mike Belanger departed in 2013, leaving Les Emmerson and Ted Gerow as the lone original members.

Emmerson also retained the rights to the band's recordings, and licensed several best-of compilations on CD.

Tesla scored a hit with a cover of the song "Signs" on their album Five Man Acoustical Jam in 1990, and in 2005, Fatboy Slim released a single called "Don't Let the Man Get You Down", based mostly on a looped sample from "Signs", specifically the opening line, "And the sign said long-haired freaky people need not apply."

The group released an updated version of "Signs" in 2014, titled "Signs 4 Change", to highlight the ecological problem of climate change. This version was produced by Eddie Kramer and included guest appearances, including Lawrence Gowan of Styx.

Brian Rading, bassist and founding member, died of cancer, age 69, on 8 June 2016 at his home in Hull, Quebec.

Les Emmerson died at his home in Ottawa at age 77 on 10 December 2021 of COVID-19 after suffering from several other health issues that weakened his resistance to the virus, according to his family.

After Emmerson's death, the group continued on with Mike Crepin (vocals, guitar), but following Gerow's retirement in 2022, the band (who recruited keyboardist Allen Wilmore and continued on) now had no original players.

== Members ==
=== Current members ===
- Steve Hollingworth – drums, percussion, vocals (1998–present)
- Wes Reed – percussion (2001–present)
- Rick Smithers – bass guitar (2004–present)
- Brian Sim - guitars (2007–present)
- Mike Crepin - guitars, vocals (2021–present)
- Allen Wilmore - keyboards (2022–present)

=== Former members ===
- Ted Gerow – keyboards, backing vocals (1969–1975, 1986–2022)
- Les Emmerson – lead vocals, guitars, synthesizers (1969–1975, 1986–2021; his death)
- Mike 'Bell' Belanger – drums, percussion, vocals (1969–1973, 1986–2013)
- Brian Rading – bass guitar, backing vocals (1969–1973, 1986–2004; died 2016)
- Rick Belanger – percussion, drums, vocals (1969–1974, 1986–1997)
- Ross McRae - guitars (2002–2007)

=== Touring musicians ===
- Vern Craig – guitars, vocals (1986)

== Discography ==
=== Studio albums ===
==== as The Staccatos ====
- 1966 – Initially
- 1968 – A Wild Pair (split album: one side by The Guess Who, the other by The Staccatos)

==== as Five Man Electrical Band ====
- 1969 – Five Man Electrical Band (includes several tracks originally issued on 7" singles as by The Staccatos in 1967/68)
- 1970 – Good-byes and Butterflies (#52 Canada) (#148 US Billboard)
- 1972 – Coming of Age (#49 Canada) (#199 US Billboard)
- 1973 – Sweet Paradise (#66 Canada)

=== Compilation albums ===
- 1975 – The Power of the Five Man Electrical Band: Their Greatest Hits!
- 1995 – Absolutely Right: The Best of Five Man Electrical Band
- 2008 – Half Past Midnight: The Staccatos and Beyond (CD release of 1969 Capitol LP, Five Man Electrical Band, plus numerous Staccatos singles.)
- 2009 – The Staccatos / Five Man Electrical Band: First Sparks (The Anthology 1965–1969) (2-CD release of all the Staccatos singles, and all the Five Man Electrical Band Capitol singles, all tracks from the first two Capitol albums; the pre-Capitol Allied Records single; five tracks from the A Wild Pair album; and three songs never previously released.)

=== Singles ===
==== as The Staccatos ====
Year	Song	Canada	U.S. Hot 100	Album
1965	"It Isn't Easy"		-	Non-LP single
1965	"Small Town Girl"	20	-	Initially
1965	"Move to California"	26	-	Initially
1966	"It's a Long Way Home"	22	-	Initially
1966	"C'mon Everybody"	20	-	Non-LP singles
1966	"Let's Run Away"	35	-	Non-LP singles
1967	"Half Past Midnight"	8	-	Five Man Electrical Band
1967	"Catch the Love Parade"	28	-	Non-LP singles
1967	"She Fancies Herself a Lady"		-	Non-LP singles
1968	"Walker Street"	65	-	Non-LP singles
1968	"Didn't Know the Time"	59	-	Five Man Electrical Band

==== as Five Man Electrical Band ====
Year	Song	Canada	AUS	U.S. Hot 100	Album
1969	"It Never Rains On Maple Lane"	67	-	-	Five Man Electrical Band
1969	"Private Train"	37	-	-	Five Man Electrical Band
1969	"Lovin' Look"		-	-	Non-LP singles
1969	"Sunrise to Sunset"	56	-	-	Non-LP singles
1969	"Riverboat"		-	-	Non-LP singles
1970	"Moonshine (Friend of Mine)"	56	-	-	Good-byes and Butterflies
1970	"Hello Melinda, Goodbye"	55	-	-	Good-byes and Butterflies
1971	"Signs"	4	5	3	Good-byes and Butterflies
1971	"Absolutely Right"	3	59	26	Coming of Age
1972	"Julianna"	17	-	(Note: "Julianna" reached number 61 on the US Cashbox singles chart.)	Coming of Age
1972	"The Devil and Miss Lucy (Country Girl)"	65	-	-	Coming of Age
1972	"Money Back Guarantee"	17	-	72	Sweet Paradise
1972	"I'm a Stranger Here"	2	-	76	Sweet Paradise
1973	"Baby Wanna Boogie"	77	-	-	Sweet Paradise
1974	"Werewolf"	28	-	64	Non-LP singles
1975	"Johnny Get a Gun"	69	-	-	Non-LP singles
