= The Cooper Brothers =

Canadian southern rock band

- Origin: Ottawa, Ontario, Canada
- Genres: Country rock
- Years active: 1974–present
- Labels: Capricorn Records (1978-1980); Salt Records (1980); Pacemaker Entertainment (2006-present); Gunshy Productions (2010-present)
- Members: Brian Cooper; Dick Cooper; Rob Holtz; Darwin Demers; Jeff Rogers; John Steele; Sherri Harding
- Past members: Terry King; Allan Serwa; Charles Robertson III; Glenn Bell; Ed Bimm; Les Emmerson
- Website: cooperbrothersband.com

The Cooper Brothers are a Canadian southern rock band founded in Ottawa, Ontario, by brothers Brian Cooper, Dick Cooper and their long-time friend Terry King.

== Biography ==
The band's first single, "From Day to Day", was released in 1973 under the local label Diana.

The following year, the band released two more singles under the production guidance of Les Emmerson for Polydor; "Finally (With You)" and "Miss Lonely Heart".

It is believed the band's breakthrough came when they teamed up with Gary Cape and signed to Capricorn Records in 1978. This resulted in two albums, The Cooper Brothers and Pitfalls of the Ballroom. Both albums sold well and the singles "The Dream Never Dies", "Show Some Emotion" and "I'll Know Her When I See Her", charted on the Billboard Hot 100.

The Cooper Brothers were voted Best New Group in 1978, Best MOR Group in 1979 and Best Overall Group in 1980 by Canadian Contemporary Music Programmers. In 1980, "The Dream Never Dies" also earned an ASCAP award as one of the most performed songs on U.S. radio. The song has subsequently been recorded by several other artists including Bill Anderson and Juice Newton, and was also the title theme for a feature-length documentary on the Canadian National Ski Team.

At the height of their career the band toured extensively throughout North America, opening for The Doobie Brothers, Black Oak Arkansas, Joe Cocker, Charlie Daniels, Atlanta Rhythm Section, McGuinn, Clark & Hillman and Seals and Crofts. The band also worked with Chuck Leavell, who played on the Cooper Brothers' track "Ridin' High".

The band faced a dramatic transformation in 1980 when Capricorn Records folded. In 1982 they returned to the studio with Cape, now joined by Les Emmerson of Five Man Electrical Band, and produced the album Learning to Live with It, which saw little success. The Cooper Brothers produced another album with Les Emmerson, Reach for the Sky, but this album was not released. The band members parted ways in 1983. Dick Cooper transitioned from music to a career as a screenwriter for children's TV programs including You Can't Do That on Television. While working at Ottawa television station CJOH, he created his own teen drama series, Highschool Confidential.

In October 2006, the Cooper Brothers reunited to release a CD collection of their most popular tracks entitled, The Best of the Cooper Brothers under the Pacemaker label, and the band performed live together for the first time in over twenty years. The performance led to several sold-out live performances throughout Southern Ontario, including an Ottawa Bluesfest concert with the band opening up for James Taylor in front of a crowd of over 25,000 people. Following this, Richard Cooper began writing songs again and the brothers approached Colin Linden with the intent of recording another album. Linden recalls, "When I heard the songs, I thought they sounded timeless. They were brimming with ideas. They weren't trivial and they were musically and lyrically so well thought out...".

In September 2009, with Colin at the helm, the brothers went to Masterlink Studio in Nashville to begin recording with session musicians including Audley Freed, Dan Dugmore, Lynn Williams, and Steve Mackey. Following additional recordings in Ottawa and Toronto, the CD was mixed in Los Angeles by John Whynot.

In February 2010, a new Cooper Brothers album, In From the Cold, was released, featuring 12 new songs. The album also featured guest artists including Blue Rodeo's Jim Cuddy, plus Delbert McClinton and Chuck Leavell.

In June 2013, the Cooper Brothers released the album Southbound, which was recorded at the Tragically Hip's studio in Bath, Ontario, and was produced by Colin Cripps. The album featured eleven new Richard Cooper-penned tracks including the first single, "Southbound". The album also includes the tracks "Love's Been a Stranger", a duet featuring Brian and Juno Award winner Kellylee Evans, as well as "Maybe This is the Night" and "Bridges".

The live band line-up at the time includes Ed Bimm, Rob Holtz, Jeff Rogers, Darwin Demers, and John Steele. Other session musicians include Gary Craig, Topher Stott and Carey Blackwell.

Radio Silence, the Cooper Brothers' seventh studio album was released in 2017.

It was the eighth album in the band's career and the first they recorded in their hometown of Ottawa - at Audiovalley Studios. The brothers, spent over a year on this project. They relied on their live band, Jeff Rogers, Darwin Demers, Ed Bimm, Rob Holtz and John Steele. Amongst special guests on the recording are Colin Cripps, Ray Legere, and Rebecca Noelle.

The Cooper Brothers received the Mayor's City Builder Award from Ottawa Mayor Jim Watson in recognition of their charity work. This work included being founding members of Ringside for Youth, which raised $3.5M from 1993 to 2019. Former band member Al Serwa died December 30, 2021. Former band member Glenn Bell (born September 3, 1954) died in his sleep on February 16, 2019, at age 64. Another former band member Ed Bimm (born July 9, 1951) died on October 6, 2019, at age 68.

== Discography ==
=== Albums ===
==== The Cooper Brothers - 1978 - Capricorn Records ====
===== Track listing =====
All selections written by Richard Cooper. Produced by Gary Cape.

Side one

1. "Rock And Roll Cowboys" - 4:30
2. "The Dream Never Dies" - 4:11
3. "Melody's In My Mind" - 4:50
4. "Old Angel Midnight" - 4:49

Side two

1. "Life Names The Tune - We Dance" - 6:34
2. "Away From You" - 6:27
3. "Portrait" - 3:59
4. "Crazy Sundays" - 3:57

===== Personnel =====
The Cooper Brothers

- Richard Cooper - electric and acoustic guitars, lead vocals (8)
- Terry King - steel guitar, lead vocals (4), vocal arrangements
- Al Serwa - keyboards, backing vocals
- Brian Cooper - bass, lead vocals (3, 5, 7), vocal arrangements
- Glenn Bell - drums, backing vocals, percussion
- Darryl Alguire - percussion, harmony vocals
- Don Bregg - lead vocals (tracks 1, 2, 6)

Additional Personnel

- John Saunders - banjo
- Lenny Solomon - fiddle
- Charles Robertson - flute
- Al Briscoe - dobro
- Keith Jollimore - saxophone
- Gloves McGuinty - piano (8)

==== Pitfalls of the Ballroom - 1979 - Capricorn Records ====
===== Track listing =====
All selections written by Richard Cooper. Produced by Gary Cape.

Side one

1. "Make The Last One A Fast One" - 3:30
2. "I'll Know Her When I See Her" - 3:44
3. "Show Some Emotion" - 3:51
4. "Ridin' Hight" - 4:47

Side two

1. "Is It The Dancer Or The Dance" - 5:07
2. "Sweet Forgiver" - 4:17
3. "Mustard The Dog" - 3:45
4. "Heroes" - 4:46

===== Personnel =====
The Cooper Brothers

- Richard Cooper - electric and acoustic guitars, lead vocals (7)
- Terry King - steel guitar, lead vocals
- Al Serwa - keyboards, backing vocals
- Brian Cooper - bass, lead vocals, vocal arrangements
- Glenn Bell - drums, backing vocals, percussion
- Darryl Alguire - guitar, percussion, harmony vocals
- Charles Robertson III - flute, harmony vocals

==== Learning To Live With It - 1982 - Salt Records ====
===== Track listing =====
All selections written by Richard Cooper. Produced by Gary Cape.

Side one

1. "If My Heart Only Knew" - 4:28
2. "Come Back Baby" - 3:02
3. "You Live Just A Little" - 3:56
4. "Poor Little Rich Girl"- 3:24
5. "Dangerous Moon" - 3:31

Side two

1. "It's What's In Your Heart That Matters" - 3:18
2. "Trouble Written All Over You" - 3:41
3. "Learning To Live With It" - 4:39
4. "Rules Of The Road" - 3:06

==== Best Of the Cooper Brothers - 2006 - Pacemaker Entertainment ====
===== Track listing =====
1. Rock & Roll Cowboys
2. The Dream Never Dies
3. Know Her When I See Her
4. Show Some Emotion
5. Dangerous Moon
6. Life Names the Tune
7. Icy Blue Eyes
8. Old Angel Midnight
9. Ridin' High
10. No Love Lost
11. Voices (In the Night)
12. If My Heart Only Knew
13. Hard Ticket
14. Away from You

==== In From The Cold - 2010 ====
===== Track listing =====
Producer: Colin Lindon

1. Gunshy
2. '62 Fairlane
3. Jukebox (Featuring Delbert McClinton)
4. Hard Luck Girl (Featuring Jim Cuddy)
5. That's What Makes Us Great
6. Never Cease To Amaze
7. Paradise Pie
8. Our Love Deserves Better
9. Love Of The Ages
10. Tear Down The Walls
11. The Way She Shines
12. Little Blue Church

==== Southbound - 2013 ====
===== Track listing =====
Producer: Colin Cripps

1. Southbound
2. The Last Time I Saw Georgia
3. Waiting for the Hammer to Fall
4. Love's Been a Stranger
5. Bordertown
6. Bridges
7. Maybe This is the Night
8. Five Point Five
9. Club Shangri-La
10. Havana Nights
11. What I Leave Behind

==== Radio Silence - 2017 ====
===== Track listing =====
Producer: The Cooper Brothers

1. Radio Silence
2. Smuggler's Moon
3. Straight Outta Nowhere
4. (There's Gonna Be) Rain
5. I'm Not Afraid
6. End Of The Day
7. Mister One Percent
8. Government Town
9. Gone Are The Days
10. You Don't Have To Worry
11. Follow Your Heart
12. Getting Away With It

=== Singles ===
45s
Year	Label	Number	A Side	B Side
1973	Diana	DO-1008	From Day to Day	What She Can Do
1974	Polydor	2065-220	Finally (with you)	Lovers
1974	Polydor	2065-237DJ	Miss Lonely Heart	Miss Lonely Heart
1978	Capricorn Records	CPS-0315	Away From You	Portrait
1978	Capricorn Records	CPS-0303	Rock and Roll Cowboys	Portrait
1978	Capricorn Records	CPS-0308	The Dream Never Dies	Crazy Sundays
1979	Capricorn Records	CPS-0323	The Dream Never Dies	Rock and Roll Cowboys
1979	Capricorn Records	CPS-0325	I'll Know Her When I See Her	Heroes
1979	Capricorn Records	CPS-0330	Show Some Emotion	Mustard The Dog
1982	Salt Records	SR-104 DJ	If My Heart Only Knew (DJ)	If My Heart Only Knew (LP)

== The Cooper Brothers gallery ==
The Original Cooper Brothers

Civic Centre 1982

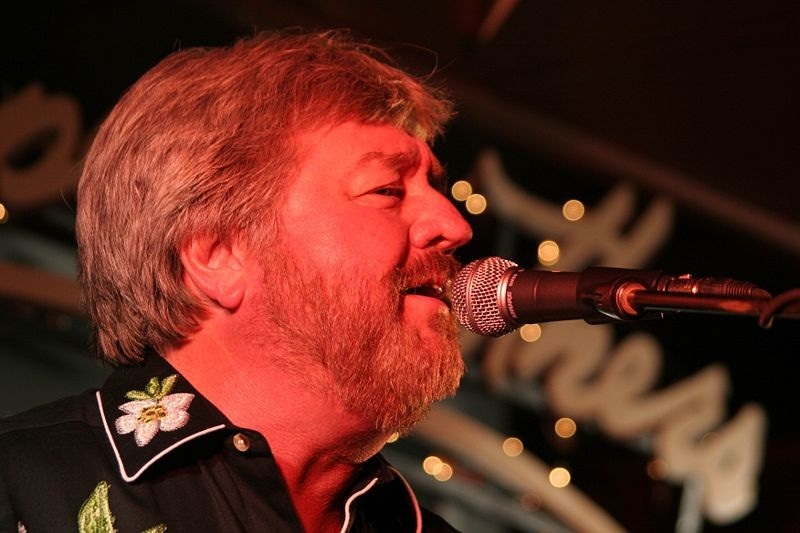
Brian Cooper

Dick Cooper
Brian & Darwin

Jeff Rogers

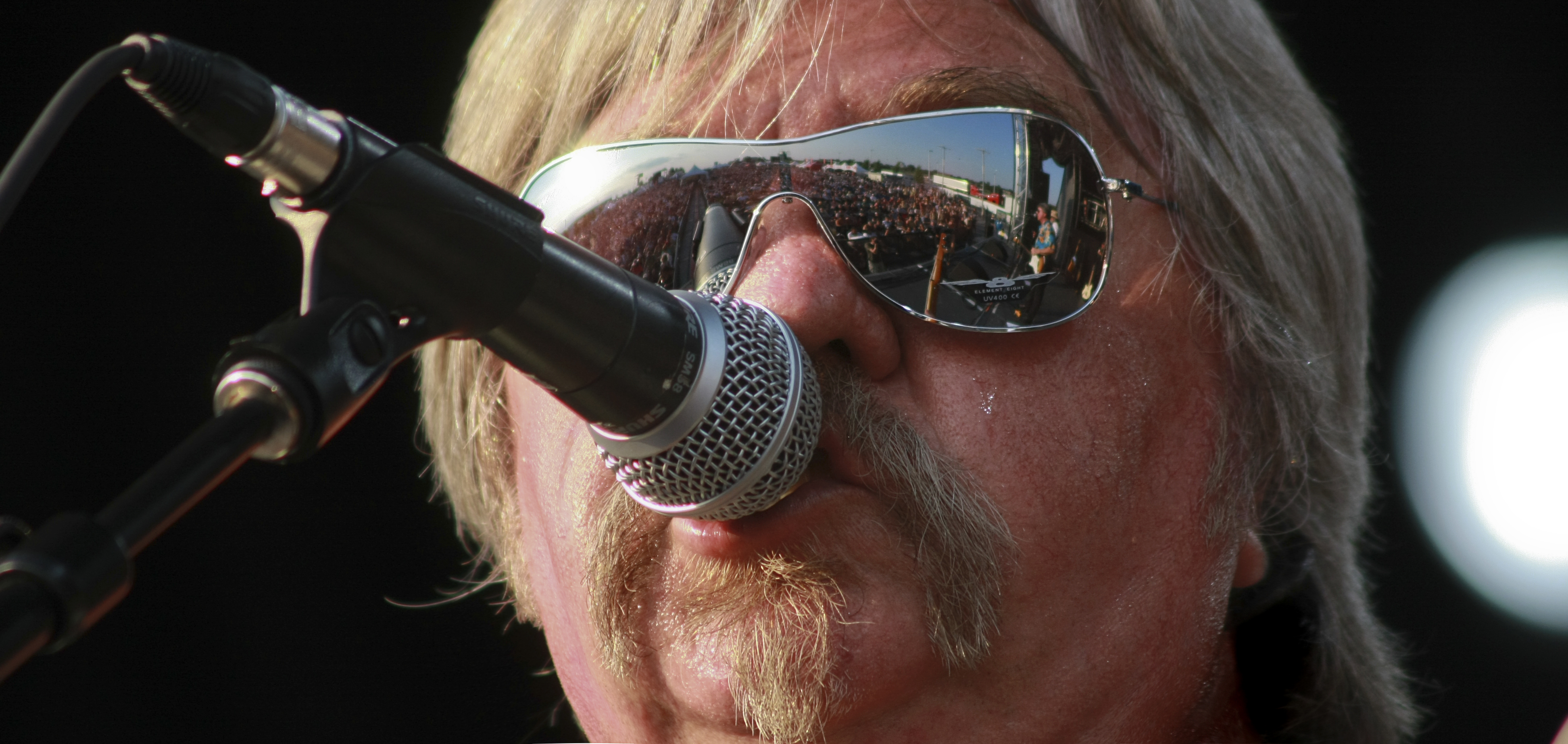
Brian Cooper
Darwin Demers

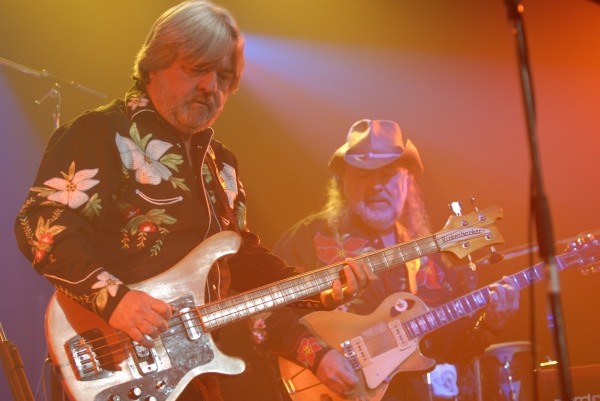
Barrymore's 2008

Rob Holtz
