= Homage =

Homage (Old English) or Hommage (French) may refer to:

== History ==
- Homage (feudal), the medieval oath of allegiance
- Commendation ceremony, medieval homage ceremony

== Arts ==
- Homage (arts), an allusion or imitation by one artist to another
- Homage Comics, a comics imprint
- Homage (sculpture), by Haydn Davies, created 1975 and destroyed in 2005

== Music ==
- Homage (Jimmy Somerville album), 2015
- Homage (Joe Lovano album), 2025
- Homage, a 1992 album by the Blues Band
- Hommage (album), a 1975 album by American jazz pianist Andrew Hill
- Hommage, an album by Yannick Noah
- Hommages, 1997 album by Nana Mouskouri

== Film ==
- Homage (film), a 1995 American film
- Hommage (film), a 2022 South Korean film

== See also ==
- Homage to Catalonia, a 1938 book by George Orwell
