= Hang Tough =

Single by Tesla

from the album The Great Radio Controversy
- Released: April 1989
- Recorded: 1988
- Studio: Bearsville (Woodstock)
- Length: 4:21
- Label: Geffen
- Songwriter(s): Jeff Keith; Tommy Skeoch; Frank Hannon; Brian Wheat
- Producer(s): Steve Thompson; Michael Barbiero

Tesla singles chronology
"Heaven's Trail (No Way Out)" (1989)	"Hang Tough" (1989)	"Love Song" (1989)

"Hang Tough" is a song by American rock band Tesla. The song was released as the second single from the band's second studio album, The Great Radio Controversy. "Hang Tough" peaked at #34 on the Billboard Hot Mainstream Rock Tracks chart.

== Music video ==
The song's music video was directed by Nigel Dick.

The music video begins with a boy playing with an old telegraph, similar to the image on the album's cover art. The rest of the video shows the band performing the song in a darkened room.

== Track listing ==
No.	Title	Length
1.	"Hang Tough"	4:21

== Personnel ==
- Jeff Keith − vocals
- Tommy Skeoch − lead guitar
- Frank Hannon − rhythm guitar
- Brian Wheat − bass
- Troy Luccketta − drums

== Charts ==
Chart (1989)	Peak position
US Mainstream Rock (Billboard)	34
