= Real to Reel (Tesla album) =

Studio album by Tesla
- Released: June 5, 2007
- Recorded: 2007
- Genres: Hard rock; blues rock
- Length: 64:30
- Labels: Tesla Electric Company Recordings, Ryko

Tesla chronology
Into the Now (2004)	Real to Reel (2007)	Real to Reel, Vol. 2 (2007)

Professional ratings
Review scores
Source	Rating
About.com	3.5/5 stars
AllMusic	3/5 stars
antiMusic	4/5 stars
Melodic.net	2/5 stars
Sea of Tranquility	4/5 stars

Real to Reel is the sixth studio album by hard rock band Tesla. Released on June 5, 2007, it includes covers of classic rock songs from the late 1960s and early 1970s recorded by Tesla in their own style using analog tape and vintage equipment. Best Buy included a limited, exclusive Bonus CD with the purchase of "Real to Reel". This Bonus CD includes 4 songs, "War Pigs" from Reel Two, and unplugged versions of "Shine Away", "Modern Day Cowboy" and "Paradise".

Additional 12 tracks recorded during the Real to Reel sessions, were released on a second volume, entitled Real to Reel, Vol. 2.

== Track listing ==
No.	Title	Writer(s)	Original artist (date)	Length
1.	"Space Truckin'"	Ritchie Blackmore, Ian Gillan, Roger Glover, Jon Lord, Ian Paice	Deep Purple (1972)	4:51
2.	"Walk Away"	Joe Walsh	James Gang (1971)	4:23
3.	"Hand Me Down World"	Kurt Winter	The Guess Who (1970)	3:46
4.	"Bad Reputation"	Phil Lynott, Scott Gorham, Brian Downey	Thin Lizzy (1977)	4:42
5.	"Thank You"	Jimmy Page, Robert Plant	Led Zeppelin (1969)	4:49
6.	"I've Got a Feeling"	John Lennon, Paul McCartney	The Beatles (1970)	4:28
7.	"Day of the Eagle"	Robin Trower	Robin Trower (1974)	5:03
8.	"Ball of Confusion"	Norman Whitfield, Barrett Strong	The Temptations (1970)	4:27
9.	"Rock Bottom"	Michael Schenker, Phil Mogg	UFO (1974)	8:47
10.	"Stealin'"	Ken Hensley	Uriah Heep (1973)	4:05
11.	"Bell Bottom Blues"	Eric Clapton	Derek and the Dominos (1970)	5:00
12.	"Honky Tonk Women"	Mick Jagger, Keith Richards	The Rolling Stones (1969)	3:28
13.	"Dear Mr. Fantasy"	Jim Capaldi, Steve Winwood, Chris Wood	Traffic (1967)	6:37

=== Best Buy Bonus Disc ===
This is a limited-edition CD included with "Real to Reel", only sold through Best Buy. It includes a Black Sabbath cover and 3 previously released Tesla songs in unplugged versions.

No.	Title	Writer(s)	Original artist (date)	Length
1.	"War Pigs"	Tony Iommi, Ozzy Osbourne, Geezer Butler, Bill Ward	Black Sabbath (1970)
2.	"Shine Away - 7:11" (Unplugged)	Frank Hannon, Jeff Keith, Brian Wheat, Tommy Skeoch	Tesla (1994)
3.	"Modern Day Cowboy" (Unplugged)	Hannon, Keith, Skeoch	Tesla (1986)
4.	"Paradise" (Unplugged)	Hannon, Keith, Wheat	Tesla (1989)

== Personnel ==
- Jeff Keith - lead vocals
- Frank Hannon - guitar, backing vocals
- Brian Wheat - bass, piano, backing vocals
- Troy Luccketta - drums, percussion
- Dave Rude - guitars, backing vocals
