= Shock (Tesla album) =

Studio album by Tesla
- Released: March 8, 2019
- Genre: Hard rock
- Length: 44:27
- Label: UMe
- Producer: Phil Collen

Tesla chronology
Simplicity (2014)	Shock (2019)	Homage (2026)

Shock is the eleventh studio album by American rock band Tesla. Produced and co-written by Phil Collen, the work was released on 8 March 2019 via UMe. and recorded at J Street Recorders.

== Background ==
In January 2019, the ensemble released the title track for the album. Shock is also the final album to feature drummer Troy Luccketta. The following month, the group published "California Summer Song".

== Critical reception ==
Robert Rheubottom of AXS stated that "The song 'Shock' opens with an insistent retro-80s sounding backbeat, supplied by drummer Troy Luccketta. Bassist Brian Wheat and guitarist Frank Hannon climb aboard to set up the ominous groove for the song's first verse as lead vocalist Jeff Keith sings, “Clock is ticking I feel it/Ain't no stopping it now.”"

Lauryn Schaffner of Loudwire said that ""Taste Like" is a cheerful, gritty rock song that stays true to the band's bluesy, '70s-inspired roots".

== Track listing ==
No.	Title	Writer(s)	Length
1.	"You Won't Take Me Alive"	Frank Hannon, Phil Collen	3:33
2.	"Taste Like"	Brian Wheat, Collen	3:11
3.	"We Can Rule the World"	Wheat, Collen	4:14
4.	"Shock"	Dave Rude, Wheat, Collen	3:36
5.	"Love Is a Fire"	Hannon, Collen	3:30
6.	"California Summer Song"	Hannon, Collen	2:57
7.	"Forever Loving You"	Hannon, Jeff Keith, Collen	3:42
8.	"The Mission"	Rude, Collen	4:03
9.	"Tied to the Tracks"	Hannon, Rude, Collen	3:28
10.	"Afterlife"	Rude, Wheat, Collen	4:39
11.	"I Want Everything"	Keith, Wheat, Collen	3:24
12.	"Comfort Zone"	Rude, Wheat, Collen	3:48
Total length:			44:27

== Personnel ==
Band

- Jeff Keith - lead vocals
- Dave Rude - guitars, vocals, bass
- Frank Hannon - guitars, vocals, piano, bass
- Brian Wheat - bass, vocals, piano
- Troy Luccketta - drums, percussion

== Charts ==
Chart (2019)	Peak position
German Albums (Offizielle Top 100)	69
Scottish Albums (Official Charts)	34
Swiss Albums (Schweizer Hitparade)	34
US Billboard 200	21
