= Real to Reel, Vol. 2 =

Studio album by Tesla
- Released: September 25, 2007
- Recorded: 2007
- Genres: Hard rock; blues rock
- Length: 64:13
- Labels: Tesla Electric Company Recordings, Ryko

Tesla chronology
Real to Reel (2007)	Real to Reel, Vol. 2 (2007)	Forever More (2008)

Professional ratings
Review scores
Source	Rating
AllMusic	3/5 stars

Real to Reel, Vol. 2 is the seventh studio album by hard rock band Tesla, and the second part of the band's covers album Real to Reel, released in retail outlets on September 25, 2007.
The album was initially only available to people attending the band's 2007 concert tour during August 2007, when the first volume was released, but then became available at retail outlets in September. It was also released free with August 2007 copies of the UK magazine Classic Rock.

Like the first Real to Reel album, the second volume also features covers of classic rock songs from the 1960s and 1970s that inspired and influenced the band, recorded by Tesla in their own style using analog tape and vintage equipment.

== Track listing ==
No.	Title	Writer(s)	Original artist (date)	Length
1.	"All The Young Dudes"	David Bowie	Mott The Hoople (1972)	3:48
2.	"Make It Last"	Sammy Hagar	Montrose (1973)	4:49
3.	"Shooting Star"	Paul Rodgers	Bad Company (1975)	5:40
4.	"Not Fragile"	C.F. Turner	Bachman-Turner Overdrive (1974)	4:37
5.	"Street Fighting Man"	Mick Jagger, Keith Richards	The Rolling Stones (1968)	4:24
6.	"Is It My Body"	Alice Cooper, Glen Buxton, Michael Bruce, Dennis Dunaway, Neal Smith	Alice Cooper (1971)	2:34
7.	"I Want to Take You Higher"	Sly Stone	Sly & the Family Stone (1969)	3:51
8.	"Do You Feel Like We Do"	Peter Frampton, Mick Gallagher, Rick Willis, John Siomos	Peter Frampton (1973)	11:44
9.	"Beer Drinkers & Hell Raisers"	Billy Gibbons, Dusty Hill, Frank Beard	ZZ Top (1973)	3:05
10.	"Seasons of Wither"	Steven Tyler	Aerosmith (1974)	4:53
11.	"Saturday Night Special"	Ed King, Ronnie Van Zant	Lynyrd Skynyrd (1975)	5:42
12.	"War Pigs"	Tony Iommi, Ozzy Osbourne, Geezer Butler, Bill Ward	Black Sabbath (1970)	9:00

== Personnel ==
- Jeff Keith - lead vocals
- Frank Hannon - guitar, backing vocals
- Brian Wheat - bass, piano, backing vocals
- Troy Luccketta - drums, percussion
- Dave Rude - guitars, backing vocals
