= Simplicity (Tesla album) =

Studio album by Tesla
- Released: June 6, 2014
- Genre: Hard rock
- Length: 60:30
- Labels: Frontiers Records (Europe), Tesla Electric Company Recording (US)
- Producers: Tesla, Tom Zutaut

Tesla chronology
Forever More (2008)	Simplicity (2014)	Shock (2019)

Professional ratings
Review scores
Source	Rating
Blabbermouth.net	8/10 stars
Metal Forces	9/10 stars

Simplicity is the tenth studio album by American hard rock band Tesla. It was released on June 10, 2014 in the US and four days earlier in Europe, "Simplicity", sold around 14,000 copies in the United States in its first week of release to land at position No. 24 on The Billboard 200 chart. The record arrived in stores on June 10 via Tesla Electric Company Recording's arrangement with Entertainment One Music and distribution.

== Track listing ==
=== North American / European / Japanese versions ===
No.	Title	Length
1.	"MP3"	5:13
2.	"Ricochet"	3:47
3.	"Rise and Fall"	3:57
4.	"So Divine..."	4:53
5.	"Cross My Heart"	4:11
6.	"Honestly"	4:13
7.	"Flip Side!"	3:33
8.	"Other Than Me"	3:22
9.	"Break of Dawn"	5:04
10.	"Burnout to Fade"	4:51
11.	"Life Is a River"	4:56
12.	"Sympathy"	4:04
13.	"Time Bomb"	4:10
14.	"'Til That Day"	4:16

Bonus tracks:
No.	Title	Length
15.	"Burnout to Fade" (Writing Demo Version)	4:29
16.	"Taste My Pain" (Japanese Bonus Track (original single released in 2013))	4:08

== Personnel ==
Band

- Jeff Keith - lead vocals
- Frank Hannon - guitars, vocals, piano, bass
- Brian Wheat - bass, vocals, piano
- Troy Luccketta - drums, percussion
- Dave Rude - guitars, vocals, bass

Production

- Michael Wagener - mixing & Mastering
- Tom Zutaut (Rock Radio Hall of Fame 2014 inductee) & TESLA - Producers

== Charts ==
Chart (2014)	Peak position
Belgian Albums (Ultratop Wallonia)	182
German Albums (Offizielle Top 100)	93
Japanese Albums (Oricon)	42
Swiss Albums (Schweizer Hitparade)	42
UK Independent Albums (Official Charts)	37
UK Rock & Metal Albums (Official Charts)	18
US Billboard 200	24
US Top Hard Rock Albums (Billboard)	2
