= Into the Now =

Studio album by Tesla
- Released: March 9, 2004
- Recorded: 2003
- Genre: Hard rock
- Length: 55:40
- Labels: T&T/Noise/Sanctuary
- Producers: Tesla, Michael Rosen, Roger Sommers

Tesla chronology
Replugged Live (2001)	Into the Now (2004)	Real to Reel (2007)

Professional ratings
Review scores
Source	Rating
AllMusic	3/5 stars
KNAC	5/5 stars
Melodic.net	3/5 stars

Into the Now is the fifth studio album by the rock band Tesla. Following a six-year hiatus due to Tommy Skeoch's rehabilitation for drug abuse, Tesla reunited for this album released in 2004.

== Track listing ==
1. Into the Now (Hannon, Keith, Luccketta) - 4:25
2. Look @ Me (Hannon, Keith, Skeoch, Sommers, Wheat) - 4:16
3. What a Shame (Hannon, Keith, Wheat) - 4:29
4. Heaven Nine Eleven (Hannon) - 4:38
5. Words Can't Explain (Hannon, Keith) - 3:14
6. Caught in a Dream (Hannon, Keith) - 4:50
7. Miles Away (Hannon, Keith) - 6:55
8. Mighty Mouse (Hannon, Keith, Sommers, Wheat) - 4:14
9. Got No Glory (Hannon, Keith) - 4:19
10. Come to Me (Hannon, Keith) - 4:43
11. Recognize (Hannon, Keith, Skeoch) - 5:00
12. Only You (Hannon, Keith, Skeoch, Sommers) - 4:33

== Personnel ==
=== Tesla ===
- Jeff Keith: Lead Vocal
- Frank Hannon: Acoustic & Electric Guitars, Keyboards, Backing Vocals
- Tommy Skeoch: Acoustic & Electric Guitars, Backing Vocals
- Brian Wheat: Bass
- Troy Luccketta: Drums, Percussion

=== Additional personnel ===
- The Section Quartet: strings, arranged by Eric Gorfain
- Michael Rosen: loops

== Production ==
- Produced by Tesla, Michael Rosen & Roger Sommers
- Engineered & Mixed by Michael Rosen
- Mastered by George Marino

== Charts ==
Chart (2004)	Peak position
French Albums (SNEP)	183
US Billboard 200	31
