= Forever More (album) =

Studio album by Tesla
- Released: October 7, 2008
- Recorded: 2008 at the J Street Recorders in Sacramento, California
- Genre: Hard rock
- Labels: Tesla Electric Company Recordings, Ryko
- Producer: Terry Thomas

Tesla chronology
Real to Reel, Vol. 2 (2007)	Forever More (2008)	Simplicity (2014)

Professional ratings
Review scores
Source	Rating
411Mania	(7.5/10) (Marsicano) (8.5/10) (Murali)
AllMusic	3.5/5 stars
KNAC	4/5 stars
Melodic.net	3.5/5 stars
Rock Pages	(favorable)

Forever More is the eighth studio album by hard rock band Tesla, released on October 7, 2008. The album was produced by Terry Thomas, engineered by Michael Rosen, and recorded and mixed at J Street Recorders in Sacramento, California by Terry Thomas and Michael Rosen. The album cover art portrays the famous “Lovers of Valdaro”, discovered by archaeologists outside of Mantua, Italy, in 2007.

== Track listing ==
All songs written by Tesla (Jeff Keith, Frank Hannon, Brian Wheat, Troy Luccketta and Dave Rude) and Terry Thomas.

No.	Title	Length
1.	"Forever More"	5:04
2.	"I Wanna Live"	3:35
3.	"One Day at a Time"	3:11
4.	"So What!"	3:39
5.	"Just in Case"	4:38
6.	"Fallin' Apart"	4:22
7.	"Breakin' Free"	3:27
8.	"All of Me"	3:27
9.	"The First Time"	4:11
10.	"Pvt. Ledbetter"	3:23
11.	"In A Hole Again"	5:25
12.	"The Game"	4:53

=== Bonus tracks ===
1. "My Way" (European only Bonus Track) - 2:56
2. "What a Shame" (live) (European only Bonus Track) - 4:47
3. "Mama's Fool" (live) (Japan only Bonus Track)

== Personnel ==
- Jeff Keith - lead vocals
- Frank Hannon - guitars, piano, backing vocals
- Brian Wheat - bass, backing vocals
- Troy Luccketta - drums, percussion
- Dave Rude - guitars, backing vocals

== Charts ==
Chart (2008)	Peak position
UK Independent Albums (Official Charts)	34
US Billboard 200	33
