= Little Suzi's on the Up =

1981 single by Ph.D.

Single by Ph.D.

from the album Ph.D.
- B-side: "I'm Gonna Take You to the Top"
- Released: 1981
- Recorded: 1981
- Genre: New wave
- Length: 3:14
- Label: Atlantic
- Songwriters: Jim Diamond, Tony Hymas
- Producer: Ph.D.

Ph.D. singles chronology
"Little Suzi's on the Up" (1981)	"I Won't Let You Down" (1982)

"Little Suzi's on the Up" is a song by British new wave group Ph.D. It was released as the band's first single, appearing on their self-titled debut album. The music video for the song was notable for being the fifth music video shown during MTV's launch on 1 August 1981. It is sometimes misspelled by music video stations as Susie or Suzy. Suzi is the correct spelling.

== Music video ==
The music video for the song is comical and features fast motion at times. It begins with keyboardist Tony Hymas arriving and taking out a "roll out" keyboard from his case and applying it onto the piano to play. It then moves on to lead singer Jim Diamond, who is a butcher, chopping meat and dancing with a pig that has a number on it, as he would be with "Suzi" when they go ballroom dancing which then features a judge who appears constantly with two scorecards. It moves on to Suzi who is at a salon getting her hair done and decides to dance with a hairdryer surprising the salonist. It then shows Diamond with his tuxedo on, ironing his trousers with steam arising. When he looks into the mirror, a picture of Fred Astaire appears; this is also the same with Suzi (except she sees herself as Ginger Rogers, the picture shows her dancing with Astaire nonetheless). It then features the stylist (who is presumably Ruby in the song) eating a pickled egg with a cold cuts fork (the eggs are used as a running gag throughout the video). Suzi then picks up her dress from drummer Mark Craney in the closet, with the judge appearing from the hamper. Diamond arrives to pick up Suzi who comes running to his motorcycle with the trailer somehow gotten unhitched. Suzi then is seen riding behind Diamond on the motorcycle as they arrive at Hammersmith Palais featuring other ballroom dancers. Ruby, who is the saxophonist, quickly arrives at the hall trying to blow into the sax which is clogged by a pickled egg which amuses her and she eats it and continues her solo. The reoccurring judge gives them a 10, and they have won. As Suzi approaches the stage in a dignified manner, the prize is a jar of pickled eggs with the other dancers leaving in dismay. The video ends with Hymas rolling up his keyboard from the piano back into his case and leaving the stage.

== Track listing ==
No.	Title	Length
1.	"Little Suzi's on the Up"	3:14
2.	"I'm Gonna Take You to the Top"	3:30

== Tesla version ==
"Little Suzi"

Single by Tesla

from the album Mechanical Resonance
- B-side: "Cumin' Atcha Live" (remix)
- Released: March 1987
- Recorded: Bearsville Studios, Bearsville, New York, 1986
- Genre: Hard rock
- Length: 4:55 (album version); 3:52 (radio edit)
- Label: Geffen
- Songwriters: Jim Diamond, Tony Hymas
- Producers: Steve Thompson, Michael Barbiero

Tesla singles chronology
"Modern Day Cowboy" (1986)	"Little Suzi" (1987)	"Heaven's Trail (No Way Out)" (1989)

Rock band Tesla covered the song in 1986 under the name "Little Suzi". Tesla released the cover as the second single from their debut album, Mechanical Resonance. The single broke Tesla into the mainstream and was the most successful single from their debut, reaching #91 on the Billboard Hot 100.

=== Music video ===
The video for Tesla's version simply shows the band performing the song on a stage.

=== Track listing ===
No.	Title	Length
1.	"Little Suzi" (radio edit)	3:52
2.	"Cumin' Atcha Live" (remix)	4:02

=== Charts ===
Chart (1987)	Peak position
US Billboard Hot 100	91
US Mainstream Rock (Billboard)	22

=== Personnel ===
- Jeff Keith – vocals
- Frank Hannon – lead guitar, acoustic guitar, mandolin
- Tommy Skeoch – rhythm guitar, acoustic guitar
- Brian Wheat – bass guitar
- Troy Luccketta – drums
