= Bust a Nut =

Studio album by Tesla
- Released: August 23, 1994
- Recorded: 1994
- Studio: Fantasy (Berkeley, California)
- Genres: Hard rock; blues rock; pop metal; glam metal
- Length: 68:58
- Label: Geffen
- Producer: Terry Thomas

Tesla chronology
Psychotic Supper (1991)	Bust a Nut (1994)	Time's Makin' Changes – The Best of Tesla (1995)

Singles from Bust a Nut
- 1. "Mama's Fool" Released: 1994; 2. "Need Your Lovin'" Released: 1994; 3. "A Lot to Lose" Released: 1995

Bust a Nut is the fourth studio album by American hard rock band Tesla, released in 1994. It was their final studio album on Geffen Records. The first single was "Mama's Fool", followed by "Need Your Loving" and "A Lot to Lose". The album was certified gold by RIAA on March 16, 1995.

== Critical reception ==
Professional ratings
Review scores
Source	Rating
AllMusic	3.5/5 stars
Entertainment Weekly	B

In November 2011, Bust a Nut was ranked number ten (preceded by R.E.M.'s Monster) on Guitar World magazine's top ten list of guitar albums of 1994.

== Track listing ==
No.	Title	Writer(s)	Length
1.	"The Gate / Invited"	Hannon, Keith, Skeoch, Wheat	5:36
2.	"Solution"	Keith, Skeoch	3:55
3.	"Shine Away"	Hannon, Keith, Skeoch, Wheat	6:42
4.	"Try So Hard"	Keith, Wheat	5:43
5.	"She Want She Want"	Hannon, Keith	5:13
6.	"Need Your Lovin'"	Keith, Luccketta, Skeoch	4:18
7.	"Action Talks"	Keith, Skeoch	3:48
8.	"Mama's Fool"	Hannon, Keith	6:11
9.	"Cry"	Hannon, Keith, Wheat	4:58
10.	"Earthmover"	Hannon, Keith	4:05
11.	"A Lot to Lose"	Hannon, Keith, Wheat	5:11
12.	"Rubberband"	Hannon, Keith, Wheat	4:35
13.	"Wonderful World"	Hannon, Keith, Skeoch	3:48
14.	"Games People Play"	Joe South	4:55
Total length:			68:58

== Personnel ==
- Jeff Keith: Lead Vocals
- Frank Hannon: Acoustic & Electric Guitars, Keyboards, Backing Vocals
- Tommy Skeoch: Acoustic & Electric Guitars, Backing Vocals
- Brian Wheat: Bass, Backing Vocals
- Troy Luccketta: Drums, Percussion

== Production ==
- Produced By Terry Thomas
- Engineered By Rafe McKenna & Andrew Scarth
- Assistant Engineer: Richard Duarte
- Mixing: Rafe McKenna & Terry Thomas
- Mastering: George Marino

== Charts ==
Chart (1994)	Peak position
Austrian Albums (Ö3 Austria)	37
Finnish Albums (The Official Finnish Charts)	33
Japanese Albums (Oricon)	31
Swiss Albums (Schweizer Hitparade)	43
UK Albums (Official Charts)	51
US Billboard 200	20

== Certifications ==
Region	Certification	Certified units/sales
United States (RIAA)	Gold	500,000^{^}
^{^} Shipments figures based on certification alone.
