= Psychotic Supper =

Studio album by Tesla
- Released: September 10, 1991
- Recorded: 1991
- Genres: Pop metal; blues rock
- Length: 68:01
- Label: Geffen
- Producers: Steve Thompson; Michael Barbiero; Tesla

Tesla chronology
Five Man Acoustical Jam (1990)	Psychotic Supper (1991)	Bust a Nut (1994)

Singles from Psychotic Supper
- 1. "Edison's Medicine" Released: 1991; 2. "Call It What You Want" Released: 1991; 3. "What You Give" Released: 1992; 4. "Song & Emotion" Released: 1992; 5. "Stir It Up" Released: 1992

Professional ratings
Review scores
Source	Rating
AllMusic	3.5/5 stars
Entertainment Weekly	C+
Metal Hammer	4/5 stars
Rock Hard	10/10

Psychotic Supper is the third studio album by American hard rock band Tesla, released in 1991. It peaked at 13 on the Billboard 200 and was certified platinum by RIAA on November 5, 1993.

The album's artwork differs between different formats. Vinyl releases depict an image of Nikola Tesla at a dinner table, while CD releases feature an insert that shows a close up of the middle right of the same image, folding out to reveal the same image, the only difference being the location of the band's logo.

== Music ==
According to AllMusic, the album "mashes a few convincing pop metal hits with moderate stabs at the Black Crowes' roots rock purity".

== Reception ==
The album's reception was mostly positive. Steve Huey from AllMusic gave the album three-and-a-half stars, saying it "benefits from a more stripped-down production than The Great Radio Controversy, using fewer overdubs and thereby enhancing Tesla's bluesy, acoustic-tinged rock & roll".

In 2005, Psychotic Supper was ranked number 475 in Rock Hard magazine's book The 500 Greatest Rock & Metal Albums of All Time. The album was retrospectively called Tesla's peak by Ultimate Classic Rock writer Matt Wardlaw in 2016.

== Track listing ==
No.	Title	Writer(s)	Length
1.	"Change in the Weather"	Keith, Skeoch, Hannon	3:38
2.	"Edison's Medicine"	Keith, Barbiero, Hannon, Skeoch, Wheat	4:47
3.	"Don't De-Rock Me"	Keith, Barbiero, Skeoch	5:11
4.	"Call It What You Want"	Keith, Barbiero, Wheat	4:29
5.	"Song & Emotion"	Keith, Barbiero, Hannon, Skeoch	8:29
6.	"Time"	Keith, Hannon	5:13
7.	"Government Personnel"	Keith, Hannon	0:58
8.	"Freedom Slaves"	Keith, Hannon, Skeoch, Wheat	6:40
9.	"Had Enough"	Keith, Skeoch	4:49
10.	"What You Give"	Keith, Hannon	7:15
11.	"Stir It Up"	Keith, Skeoch	5:41
12.	"Can't Stop"	Keith, Hannon, Skeoch, Wheat	5:27
13.	"Toke About It"	Keith, Barbiero, Hannon	5:24
Total length:			68:01

== Personnel ==
Tesla

- Jeff Keith – vocals
- Tommy Skeoch – guitars
- Frank Hannon – guitars, piano, synth, organ
- Brian Wheat – bass
- Troy Luccketta – drums

Production

- Lee Anthony – mixing assistant
- Michael Barbiero – arranger, composer, engineer, mixing, producer
- George Cowan – engineer
- Victor Deyglio – engineer
- Lolly Grodner – mixing assistant

Art

- Nick Egan – art direction, design
- Michael Halsband – photography

== Charts ==
Chart (1991)	Peak position
Australian Albums (ARIA)	158
Canada Top Albums/CDs (RPM)	32
Finnish Albums (The Official Finnish Charts)	38
Japanese Albums (Oricon)	18
Swiss Albums (Schweizer Hitparade)	39
UK Albums (Official Charts)	44
US Billboard 200	13

== Certifications ==
Region	Certification	Certified units/sales
Canada (Music Canada)	Gold	50,000^{^}
United States (RIAA)	Platinum	1,000,000^{^}
^{^} Shipments figures based on certification alone.
