= Modern Day Cowboy =

Single by Tesla

from the album Mechanical Resonance
- Released: December 1986
- Recorded: 1986
- Studio: Bearsville Studios in Bearsville, New York
- Genre: Hard rock, heavy metal
- Length: 5:19
- Label: Geffen
- Songwriters: Jeff Keith; Frank Hannon; Tommy Skeoch
- Producers: Steve Thompson; Michael Barbiero

Tesla singles chronology
| "Modern Day Cowboy" (1986) | "Little Suzi" (1987) |

"Modern Day Cowboy" is the debut single by American rock band Tesla, from the band's debut studio album, Mechanical Resonance. The song's lyrics make references to criminals such as Billy the Kid and Al Capone, until the final verse, which references Cold War tensions between the United States and the Soviet Union.

== Music video ==
A music video was produced for the song, which shows Nikola Tesla playing films in an abandoned movie theater. Tesla shows footage of the band performing the song, along with scenes from the movies High Noon, Scarface, and Dr. Strangelove. The beginning of the video shows the theater marquee with the names of all three films with some letters missing, along with the name of the band.

== Track listing ==
| No. | Title | Length |
|---|---|---|
| 1. | "Modern Day Cowboy" | 5:19 |
| 2. | "Love Me" (live) | 4:36 |
| 3. | "Cover Queen" (live) | 4:31 |

== Charts ==
| Chart (1987) | Peak position |
|---|---|
| US Mainstream Rock (Billboard) | 10 |

== In popular culture ==
The song was featured in the video game Guitar Hero: Warriors of Rock. The song was also featured in the Supernatural episode "Beyond the Mat".

== Personnel ==
- Jeff Keith – lead vocals
- Frank Hannon – lead guitar, acoustic guitar, backing vocals
- Tommy Skeoch – rhythm guitar, acoustic guitar, backing vocals
- Brian Wheat – bass guitar
- Troy Luccketta – drums
