= Mechanical Resonance (album) =

Studio album by Tesla
- Released: December 8, 1986
- Recorded: 1986
- Studio: Bearsville (Woodstock, New York)
- Genres: Hard rock; glam metal
- Length: 53:28
- Label: Geffen
- Producers: Steve Thompson, Michael Barbiero

Tesla chronology
Mechanical Resonance (1986)	The Great Radio Controversy (1989)

Singles from Mechanical Resonance
- 1. "Modern Day Cowboy" Released: 1986; 2. "Little Suzi" Released: 1987; 3. "Gettin' Better" Released: February 1988

Professional ratings
Review scores
Source	Rating
AllMusic	4/5 stars
Collector's Guide to Heavy Metal	6/10
Metal Forces	9.3/10
Rock Hard	8/10
Rolling Stone	(mixed)

Mechanical Resonance is the debut studio album by the American hard rock band Tesla. It was released on December 8, 1986, by Geffen Records. The album peaked at No. 32 on the Billboard 200 on April 3, 1987, and was certified platinum by the RIAA on October 5, 1989.

== Track listing ==
Side one
No.	Title	Writer(s)	Length
1.	"EZ Come EZ Go"	Frank Hannon, Jeff Keith, Troy Luccketta, Tommy Skeoch, Brian Wheat	3:33
2.	"Cumin' Atcha Live"	Hannon, Keith, Wheat	4:25
3.	"Gettin' Better"	Hannon, Keith	3:20
4.	"2 Late 4 Love"	Keith, Skeoch, Hannon, Luccketta, Wheat	3:50
5.	"Rock Me to the Top"	Keith, Skeoch	3:38
6.	"We're No Good Together"	Hannon, Keith, Luccketta	5:15

Side two
No.	Title	Writer(s)	Length
7.	"Modern Day Cowboy"	Hannon, Keith, Skeoch	5:19
8.	"Changes"	Hannon, Keith, Luccketta, Skeoch, Wheat	5:02
9.	"Little Suzi" (Ph.D. cover)	Jim Diamond, Tony Hymas	4:55
10.	"Love Me"	Hannon, Keith, Wheat	4:15
11.	"Cover Queen"	Hannon, Keith	4:32
12.	"Before My Eyes"	Hannon, Keith, Luccketta, Skeoch	5:25

== Personnel ==
Band members

- Jeff Keith – lead vocals
- Frank Hannon – acoustic & electric guitars, keyboards, mandolin, backing vocals
- Tommy Skeoch – acoustic & electric guitars, backing vocals
- Brian Wheat – bass, backing vocals
- Troy Luccketta – drums, percussion

Production

- Steve Thompson – producer
- Michael Barbiero – producer, engineer
- Michael Beyer – engineer and mixing on "Little Suzi" acoustic intro
- George Marino – mastering at Sterling Sound, New York

== Charts ==
=== Weekly charts ===
Chart (1987)	Peak position
US Billboard 200	32

=== Year-end charts ===
Chart (1987)	Position
US Billboard 200	57

== Certifications ==
Region	Certification	Certified units/sales
United States (RIAA)	Platinum	1,000,000^{^}
^{^} Shipments figures based on certification alone.

== Accolades ==
Publication	Country	Accolade	Rank
PopMatters	US	10 Essential Glam Metal Albums	4
Guitar World	US	Top 20 Hair Metal Albums of the Eighties	8
Loudwire	US	Top 30 Hair Metal Albums	7
