= The Great Radio Controversy =

Studio album by Tesla
- Released: February 1, 1989
- Recorded: 1988
- Studio: Bearsville (Woodstock, New York)
- Genres: Hard rock; glam metal
- Length: 59:18
- Label: Geffen
- Producers: Steve Thompson; Michael Barbiero

Tesla chronology
Mechanical Resonance (1986)	The Great Radio Controversy (1989)	Five Man Acoustical Jam (1990)

Singles from The Great Radio Controversy
- 1. "Heaven's Trail (No Way Out)" Released: January 1989; 2. "Hang Tough" Released: April 1989; 3. "Love Song" Released: August 11, 1989; 4. "The Way It Is" Released: March 1990

Professional ratings
Review scores
Source	Rating
AllMusic	4/5 stars
Collector's Guide to Heavy Metal	7/10
Kerrang!	4.5/5 stars
Rolling Stone	4/5 stars
Sounds	4/5 stars

The Great Radio Controversy is the second studio album by American hard rock band Tesla, released in 1989. The album's sound has been described as "glam metal to play inside the cab of a tractor-blusey denim and downright wholesome".

The hit singles "Love Song", "Heaven's Trail (No Way Out)", "Hang Tough" and "The Way It Is" received considerable airplay on MTV's Headbangers Ball and rocketed the band to stardom. The album was certified double platinum by the RIAA on July 23, 1998.

The album is titled after the controversy about the identity of the inventor of radio. It is posited that Serbian engineer Nikola Tesla (whom the band is named after) is the true inventor of radio, while the Italian Guglielmo Marconi took the credit and is widely regarded as having the title. The album's inner sleeve recounts this story.

== Critical reception ==
Kirk Blows of British newspaper Music Week gave a positive response to the album. He said that the album musical material will "satisfy even the most fastidious rock fan", and that "there's plenty of light and shade here too, all conveyed with an overwhelming air of confidence from a band set to expand on their promising base".

Spin wrote, "This is hard rock's call to the Party, and it will compel anyone with a butt to wiggle and huff and leap around playing air to all eight solos."

== Track listing ==
No.	Title	Writer(s)	Length
1.	"Hang Tough"	Jeff Keith, Tommy Skeoch, Frank Hannon, Brian Wheat	4:21
2.	"Lady Luck"	Keith, Skeoch, Hannon, Wheat	3:39
3.	"Heaven's Trail (No Way Out)"	Keith, Skeoch	4:41
4.	"Be a Man"	Keith, Hannon, Skeoch	4:20
5.	"Lazy Days, Crazy Nights"	Keith, Skeoch	4:26
6.	"Did It for the Money"	Keith, Skeoch, Hannon	4:25
7.	"Yesterdaze Gone"	Keith, Hannon	3:43
8.	"Makin' Magic"	Keith, Skeoch, Hannon, Wheat	5:03
9.	"The Way It Is"	Keith, Skeoch, Hannon, Troy Luccketta	5:14
10.	"Flight to Nowhere"	Keith, Skeoch, Hannon, Wheat	4:43
11.	"Love Song"	Keith, Hannon	5:20
12.	"Paradise"	Keith, Hannon, Wheat	4:59
13.	"Party's Over"	Keith, Hannon, Skeoch	4:24

== Personnel ==
Tesla

- Jeff Keith – vocals
- Tommy Skeoch – guitars, backing vocals
- Frank Hannon – guitars, piano, synthesizer, organ
- Brian Wheat – bass, backing vocals
- Troy Luccketta – drums

Production

- Steve Thompson – producer, mixing at Mediasound, New York City
- Michael Barbiero – producer, engineer, mixing
- George Cowan – additional recording and assistant engineer
- Vic Deyglio – assistant engineer
- George Marino – mastering at Sterling Sound, New York City
- Barry Diament – CD mastering at BDA, New York City

== Charts ==
=== Weekly charts ===
Chart (1989)	Peak position
Australian Albums (ARIA)	121
Canada Top Albums/CDs (RPM)	72
Dutch Albums (Album Top 100)	91
Japanese Albums (Oricon)	94
UK Albums (Official Charts)	34
US Billboard 200	18

=== Year-end charts ===
Chart (1989)	Position
US Billboard 200	73

== Certifications ==
Region	Certification	Certified units/sales
Canada (Music Canada)	Gold	50,000^{^}
United States (RIAA)	2× Platinum	2,000,000^{^}
^{^} Shipments figures based on certification alone.

== Accolades ==
Publication	Country	Accolade	Rank
Rolling Stone	US	50 Greatest Hair Metal Albums of All Time	11
L.A. Weekly	US	Chuck Klosterman's Favorite Hair Metal Albums	18
Martin Popoff	US	The Top 500 Heavy Metal Albums of All Time	415

== See also ==
- List of glam metal albums and songs
