= Les Emmerson =

Canadian musical artist (1944–2021)

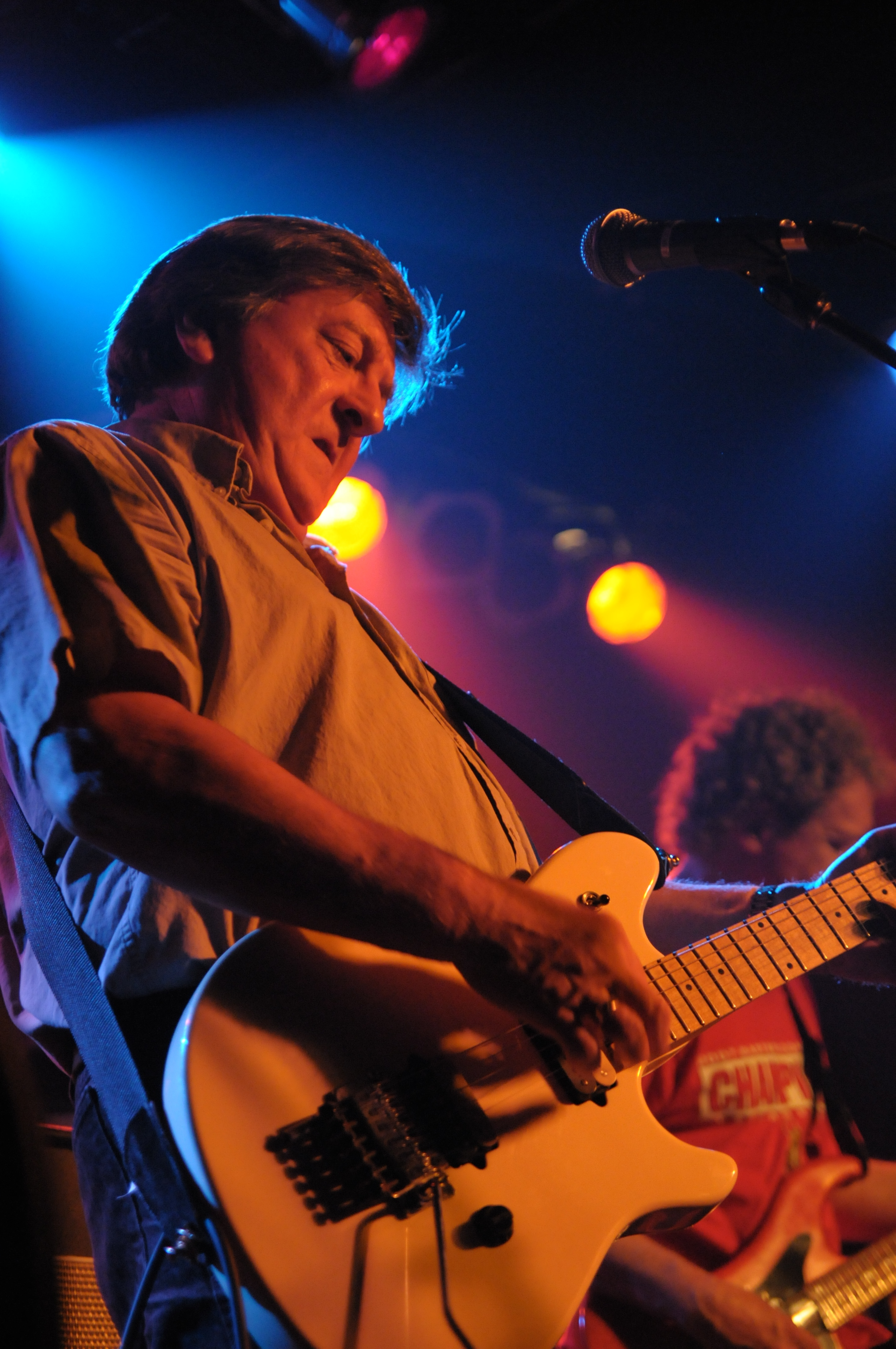
- Emmerson performing with "The Groove Junkies" in Ottawa in 2008

Background information
- Born: 17 September 1944; Ottawa, Ontario, Canada
- Died: 10 December 2021 (aged 77) Ottawa, Ontario, Canada
- Instruments: Vocals; guitar; synthesizer
- Years active: 1965–2021
- Website: fivemanelectricalband.ca

Robert Leslie Emmerson (17 September 1944 – 10 December 2021) was a Canadian musician and singer. He was the lead vocalist and guitarist for the Five Man Electrical Band, and their predecessor The Staccatos. He also recorded as a solo artist, charting three top 40 hits in Canada, including the #5 hit "Control Of Me".

== Career ==
Emmerson was best known for writing the song "Signs", which was a hit for Emmerson's Five Man Electrical Band in 1971 and also a hit for the band Tesla in 1990. Both versions of the song sold approximately 1.5 million copies at the time of each respective release. In 2004, the song was sampled by Fatboy Slim in the platinum-selling song "Don't Let the Man Get You Down". Particularly as a result of the Fatboy Slim sampling, Emmerson earned enough money from royalties on "Signs" that he could support an average lifestyle without working.

He started his solo career while still a member of Five Man Electrical Band. His first solo hit "Control Of Me" was released in late 1972, and peaked at #5 in early 1973. The follow-up single, "Cry Your Eyes Out", reached a peak of #18 on RPM Weekly's Top Singles chart in September 1973. Emmerson released two more charting solo singles in 1974 and 1975 while still with the Five Man Electrical Band, but his only release after the band broke up was the non-charting single "Borderline" in 1977. No other material was released by Emmerson until 2007, when The Sound City Sessions appeared. This album consisted of material recorded in 1976 and 1977, including "Borderline", and remains Emmerson's only solo album; his other solo singles have never been released on LP or CD.

== Death ==
Emmerson died from complications of COVID-19 on 10 December 2021, during the COVID-19 pandemic in Ottawa. He was 77.

== Discography ==
=== Singles ===
Year	Song	Canada	U.S. Hot 100
1972	"Control of Me"	5	51
1973	"Cry Your Eyes Out"	18	-
1974	"Clichés"	75	-
1975	"Watching the World Go By"	26	-
1977	"Borderline"		-
