= Love Song (Tesla song) =

Single by Tesla

from the album The Great Radio Controversy
- B-side: "I Ain't Superstitious"
- Released: August 11, 1989
- Recorded: 1988
- Genre: Glam metal; hard rock
- Length: 5:23 (album version); 4:10 (radio edit)
- Label: Geffen
- Songwriters: Jeff Keith and Frank Hannon
- Producers: Steve Thompson and Michael Barbiero

Tesla singles chronology
"Hang Tough" (1989)	"Love Song" (1989)	"The Way It Is" (1989)

"Love Song" is a power ballad written by Frank Hannon and Jeff Keith of the rock band Tesla, originally released on their 1989 album The Great Radio Controversy. The song reached number 10 on the Billboard Hot 100. It also became a gold record.

== Music video ==
On July 7, 1989, the music video was filmed during a concert in the band's home town of Sacramento at the former Cal Expo amphitheater. KRXQ (93 Rock), a local rock radio station at the time, was aware that the music video was to be filmed at the concert. The station held a contest awarding backstage passes to the fan who created the best banner that displayed "93 Rock", "Tesla", and "Love Song". Banners can be seen being held up in the audience and background throughout the video.

== Track listing ==
No.	Title	Length
1.	"Love Song" (radio edit)	4:10
2.	"I Ain't Superstitious" (Howlin' Wolf cover)	3:08

== Charts ==
=== Weekly charts ===
Chart (1989–1990)	Peak position
Canada Top Singles (RPM)	54
US Billboard Hot 100	10
US Mainstream Rock Airplay (Billboard)	7

=== Year-end charts ===
Chart (1990)	Peak position
US Billboard Hot 100	67

== Certifications ==
Region	Certification	Certified units/sales
United States (RIAA)	Gold	500,000^{^}
^{^} Shipments figures based on certification alone.
