= Tesla (band) =

American hard rock band

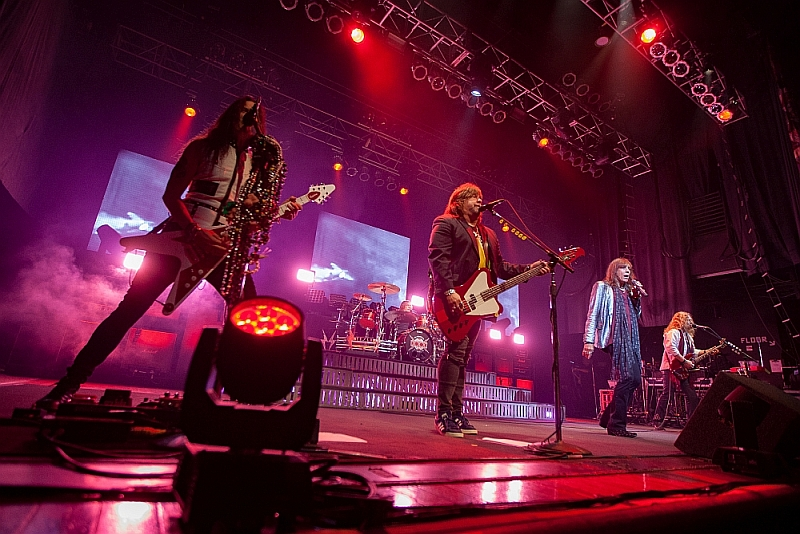
- Tesla at the House of Blues in Houston, Texas, 2019

Background information
- Also known as: Earthshaker (1981–1982); City Kidd (1982–1986)
- Origin: Sacramento, California, U.S.
- Genres: Hard rock; blues rock; glam metal; (early)
- Works: Discography
- Years active: 1981–1996; 2000–present
- Labels: Geffen; Tesla Electric Company (Ryko Distribution); UMe
- Spinoffs: Moon Dog Mane; Soulmotor; Bar 7
- Members: Brian Wheat; Frank Hannon; Jeff Keith; Dave Rude; Steve Brown
- Past members: Steve Clausman; Robert "Bobby" Contreras; Colleen Lloy; Brook Bright; Jeff Harper; Joey Murrieta; Curtis Chapman; Tommy Skeoch; Troy Luccketta
- Website: teslatheband.com

Tesla is an American hard rock band from Sacramento, California. In late 1981, bassist Brian Wheat and guitarist Frank Hannon formed a band named City Kidd, which evolved into Tesla. By 1984, vocalist Jeff Keith, guitarist Tommy Skeoch and drummer Troy Luccketta had joined the band, forming their classic lineup that appeared on all the records and live shows during their initial run. The band adopted the Tesla moniker shortly before recording their first album as another band with a name similar to City Kidd already existed.

Tesla rose to fame during the hair metal boom of the 1980s. Their debut album, Mechanical Resonance, was released in 1986, which produced two hit singles, "Modern Day Cowboy" and their cover of "Little Suzi" (originally by Ph.D.). The band's second album, The Great Radio Controversy (1989), peaked at No. 18 on the Billboard 200 album chart and produced the top-ten single "Love Song". The band recorded and released their third album, the live acoustic album Five Man Acoustical Jam, in 1990. It peaked at No. 12 on the Billboard 200 and produced their top-charting single (No. 8 on the Billboard Hot 100), "Signs", a cover of a song by the Five Man Electrical Band. Their third studio album, Psychotic Supper (1991), peaked at No. 13 but lacked a hit single. Similarly, their next album, 1994's Bust a Nut did well enough on the album charts, peaking at No. 20 but also lacked any radio hits.

The band broke up in 1996 then returned in 2000 with a live tour and album, both named Replugged. They have continued to record and tour, although Skeoch left in 2006 and was replaced by Dave Rude on guitar. Their most recent release is the covers album Homage (2026), while their latest studio album of all-new material is Shock (2019). Tesla have sold at least 14 million albums in the United States.

== History ==
=== Formation and Mechanical Resonance (1981–1988) ===
The band City Kidd was renamed Tesla during the recording of their first album, 1986's Mechanical Resonance, on the advice of their manager that City Kidd was not a great name (in addition, there was already another band going by that name). The band derived their name, certain album and song titles, and some song content from events relating to inventor and electrical engineer Nikola Tesla. Along with the band's next two studio albums, Mechanical Resonance was produced by Michael Barbiero and Steve Thompson.

The band's original lineup consisted of lead vocalist Jeff Keith, guitarists Frank Hannon and Tommy Skeoch, bassist Brian Wheat, and drummer Robert Contreras, who was soon replaced by ex-Eric Martin Band drummer Troy Luccketta.

In the early days of their career, Tesla toured with David Lee Roth, Alice Cooper, Def Leppard, and Poison, which resulted in the band being categorized as a glam metal band. The band's members resented this labeling. The band, according to Troy Luccketta, now does not mind being labeled as a part of that scene.

=== The Great Radio Controversy and Psychotic Supper (1989–1993) ===
The band released their second album, The Great Radio Controversy, in 1989. The album helped solidify the band's growing reputation and fan base, and produced five hit singles, including the power ballad "Love Song".

In 1990, Tesla released Five Man Acoustical Jam, a live album featuring acoustic renditions of hits such as "Comin' Atcha Live", "Gettin' Better", "Modern Day Cowboy", and "Love Song". The album also featured a number of covers, most notably a version of "Signs", a 1971 hit by the Five Man Electrical Band.

In 1991, the band released their third studio album Psychotic Supper. The band itself considers this to be their best album according to their official web site. The 1998 Japanese reissue import of Psychotic Supper contains one previously unreleased song, "Rock the Nation", as well as the songs "I Ain't Superstitious", and "Run Run Run", both of which had only been previously available as B-sides to two singles from The Great Radio Controversy.

=== Bust a Nut and hiatus (1994–1996) ===
In 1994, the band released their fourth studio album, Bust a Nut. The Japanese edition of Bust a Nut contained the previously unreleased cover of Led Zeppelin's "The Ocean".

After the release of Bust a Nut, Skeoch departed because of his struggle with substance abuse. He rejoined after completing rehab, only to depart again months later. The band moved forward as a four-piece for a short while. However, it wasn't long before Skeoch briefly joined up with solo artist Marshall Coleman's band to support his solo career, only to see a departure of Marshall soon after. This band eventually morphed to include Jeff Keith and resurfaced as Bar 7 with a single "Four Leaf Clover", from the album The World Is a Freak. Brian Wheat formed Soulmotor and Frank Hannon formed Moon Dog Mane, while Troy Luccketta worked with several local artists including the Bay Area's One Thin Dime.

=== Reunion, Into the Now and Real to Reel (2000–2007) ===
After a break of six years, the Sacramento Bee reported that the band had reformed in 2000 with the help of local radio personality Pat Martin of KRXQ. The band played a sold-out show at ARCO Arena in Sacramento on October 25, 2000. Soon after they recorded the double live album Replugged Live. In 2002 they were featured in the Rock Never Stops Tour alongside other 1980s rock bands.

2002 saw the release of a further live album, Standing Room Only, which is just a single CD version of Replugged Live.

In 2004, they released their fifth studio album Into the Now which debuted on the Billboard album chart at No. 30. The album was well received by fans and the band was featured on Jimmy Kimmel Live!

In the summer of 2006, the band embarked on the Electric Summer Jam Tour without guitarist Tommy Skeoch, who had left the band indefinitely to spend time with his family, and, as he later revealed on The Classic Metal Show, other reasons; particularly his continuing problems with substance abuse. Scott Johnson of the Sacramento band Rogue filled in for a time on this tour. Eventually Dave Rude replaced Skeoch permanently.

Tesla recorded a two-volume collection of cover songs titled Real to Reel, which was released on June 5, 2007. The recording is available as a two-CD set. The first CD (containing 13 songs) is sold in a case with a blank slot for the second CD. The second CD (containing 12 additional songs) was initially available to concert goers in the US at no additional charge beyond the cost of a ticket. The second CD was also given away with the August edition of Classic Rock magazine in Europe.

At the end of August, Tesla announced their first world tour in 16 years with dates in Australia, Japan, and Europe in October and November 2007.

=== Forever More and Twisted Wires (2008–2012) ===
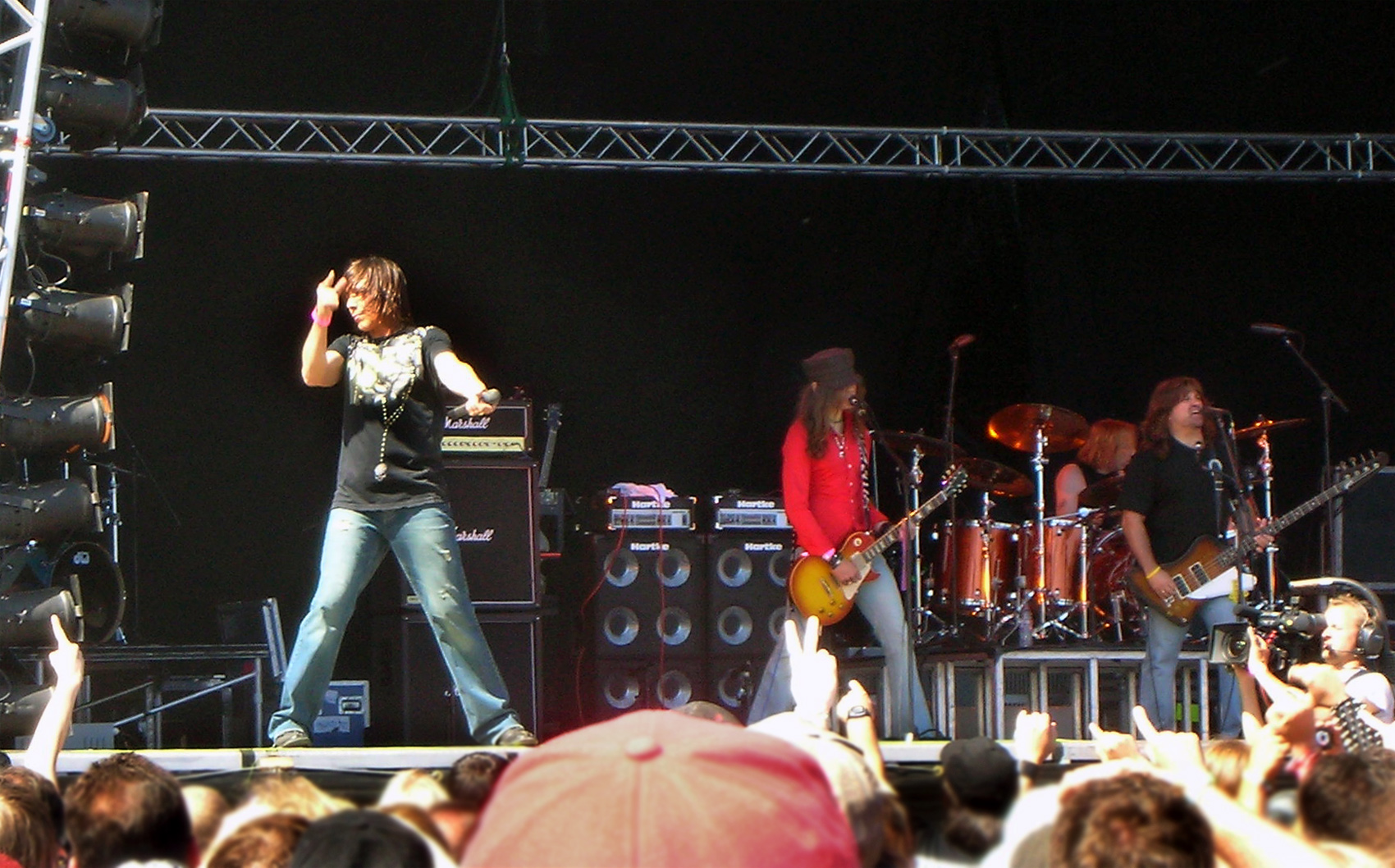
Tesla at Sweden Rock Festival 2008

In June and July 2008, Tesla played a few shows in Europe and the US, including Sweden Rock Festival, Graspop Metal Meeting and Rocklahoma. On July 15, 2008, "Tesla- Comin' Atcha Live! 2008" was released from a live concert filmed February 22, 2008 at the sold out Myth Nightclub in Maplewood, Minnesota. The two-hour show included hits "Modern Day Cowboy", "Love Song" and "Song and Emotion" along with additional backstage footage.

On August 11, 2008, it was reported that Tesla's next album, entitled Forever More, would be released on October 7 on their own record label, Tesla Electric Company Recordings. The album was produced by Terry Thomas, who produced Bust a Nut. The band aired the album's first single, "I Wanna Live" on radio stations across the globe on August 18 and kicked off a world tour on October 1. Forever More debuted No. 33 on The Billboard 200 chart and spawned singles "I Wanna Live", "Fallin' Apart" and "Breakin' Free".

On May 10, 2011, the band played at a rally for the Sacramento Kings of the NBA. Tesla performed two songs, "Signs" and "Love Song" during the Kings #HereWeRally at Cesar Chavez Park in Sacramento, California to celebrate the team staying in Sacramento for at least one more year.

On July 25, 2011, they released a mostly acoustic album titled Twisted Wires and the Acoustic Sessions.

=== Simplicity, Shock and Homage (2013–present) ===
In June 2013, Tesla released a new single "Taste My Pain" on iTunes. They released their eighth studio album Simplicity on June 6, 2014.

In 2015, the band toured with Def Leppard and Styx.

On August 26, 2016, Tesla released Mechanical Resonance Live in celebration of the album's 30th anniversary. It features live versions of every song from the original album and includes the new single "Save That Goodness", written and produced by Phil Collen of Def Leppard.

In April 2017, Tesla began working on their ninth studio album, Shock, which was produced by Collen, and released on March 8, 2019.

Tesla released the one-off single "Cold Blue Steel" in August 2021, followed a year later by "Time to Rock!".

Tesla released the six-track EP, All About Love, on November 29, 2024. It includes four versions of "All About Love", a new instrumental track, "From the Heart", as well as a live version of "Walk Away".

Tesla's first studio album in seven years, and first covers album in nineteen years, Homage was released on July 17, 2026.

== Charity work ==
While promoting their album The Great Radio Controversy, the band participated in a canned food drive that allowed free concert admission to contributors, this event was incorporated into the video for "The Way It Is". In February 2005, Tesla headlined a benefit show at the PPAC in Providence, Rhode Island, for the victims of the Station nightclub fire. During the show the band auctioned off an autographed acoustic guitar, with the proceeds going to the Station Family Fund. 100% of the ticket sales also went to this charity.

In February 2008, Tesla helped fund and headlined a benefit concert for victims of the Station nightclub fire. The show was broadcast by VH1 Classic. Tesla played three songs: "What You Give", "Signs", and "Love Song", though "What You Give" did not make it onto the broadcast.

== Musical style and influences ==
Most of Tesla's albums feature a bluesy hard rock style. Brian Wheat stated to have been influenced by classic 1960s and 1970s rock bands like Led Zeppelin, Queen, Aerosmith, Bad Company and the Beatles. Tesla's first two albums are often classified as glam metal, though AllMusic's Steve Huey opined that the band's blues and 1970s hard rock influences set them apart from their contemporaries. Loudwire described Tesla as a "thinking man's hair metal band", and VH1 ranked them at No. 22 on VH1's 100 Greatest Artists of Hair Metal.

== Band members ==
=== Current members ===
- Brian Wheat – bass, backing vocals, keyboards, piano (1981–1996, 2000–present)
- Frank Hannon – guitar, backing vocals, keyboards, piano, organ, theremin, bass, mandolin, harmonica (1981–1996, 2000–present)
- Jeff Keith – lead vocals (1984–1996, 2000–present)
- Dave Rude – guitar, backing vocals, bass (2006–present)
- Steve Brown – drums, percussion (2021–present)

=== Former members ===
- Steve Clausman (1981)
- Robert "Bobby" Contreras – drums (1981–1984)
- Colleen Lloy – guitar, lead vocals (1981–1983; joined band with Brook Bright as City Kidd)
- Brook Bright – guitar, vocals (1981–1983; formed band as City Kidd in early 1980s)
- Jeff Harper – lead vocals (original lead vocalist for Earthshaker and City Kidd until April 1983)
- Joey Murrieta – guitar (1983; before the breakout of Tesla)
- Curtis Chapman – guitar (1983–1984; before the breakout of Tesla, when they were still called City Kidd)
- Tommy Skeoch – guitar, backing vocals (1984–1994, 1995, 2000–2006)
- Troy Luccketta – drums, percussion (1984–1996, 2000–2021)

=== Touring substitutes ===
- Stefano Pasta – drums, percussion (1990; substitute for Troy Luccketta for a brief period)
- Scott Johnson – guitar, backing vocals (2006; substitute for Tommy Skeoch)
- Tommy Armstrong-Leavitt – guitar, backing vocals (2013; substitute for Dave Rude)
- Phil Collen – guitar, backing vocals (2016; substitute for Dave Rude at The Classic Rock Awards 2016)
- Ray Luzier – drums, percussion (2016; substitute for Troy Luccketta at The Classic Rock Awards 2016)
- Sammy Boller – guitar, backing vocals (2024; substitute for Frank Hannon who was dealing with father-in-law Dickey Betts' health issues)

== Discography ==
Studio albums

- Mechanical Resonance (1986)
- The Great Radio Controversy (1989)
- Psychotic Supper (1991)
- Bust a Nut (1994)
- Into the Now (2004)
- Real to Reel (2007)
- Real to Reel, Vol. 2 (2007)
- Forever More (2008)
- Twisted Wires & the Acoustic Sessions (2011)
- Simplicity (2014)
- Shock (2019)
- Homage (2026)
