= Ed Steinberg =

Ed Steinberg is a New York City-based music video producer/director. Steinberg also founded the RockAmerica video distribution network. Steinberg has a colorful reputation. He is perhaps best known for making Madonna's first ever music video in 1982 for the song "Everybody", but has produced and directed more than 90 music videos for other artists such as Gipsy Kings, Cheap Trick, U2 and Yello. Long-form television programs he has produced include music specials for MTV, Alive From Off Center for PBS, and The Palladium, Where Mambo was King for Bravo. His videos are in collections in the Whitney Museum, The Museum of Modern Art and The Guggenheim. He has served as the musical director for the Havana Film Festival New York since 2000.

Steinberg is currently the President of RockaMedia LLC, a media production and distribution company and he is also media advisor to Kidos and www.Magicflix.com educational websites for 3– to 9-year-old children.

== Music videos ==
Year	Title	Artist
1980	"Concentration"	Chandra
1980	"International Language"	Richard Strange
1980	"Growing Up American"	The Colors
1980	"Jealousy"	The Colors
1981	"Lawn Chairs"	Our Daughter's Wedding
1981	"In the Congo"	The Bongos
1981	"Too Many Creeps"	Bush Tetras
1981	"Que pasa" / "Me no pop I"	Coati Mundi
1981	"Mambo Sun"	The Bongos
1981	"Sunny Day"	Pigbag
1981	"Target for Life"	Our Daughter's Wedding
1981	"Lunatic Fringe"	Red Rider
1982	"Everybody"	Madonna
1982	"Shape Up"	The Bank
1982	"Clear it Away"	Tom Verlaine
1982	"Drum"	Way of the West
1982	"Words from the Front"	Tom Verlaine
1982	"Person Person"	Joe 'King' Carrasco
1982	"Dance After Curfew"	Nash the Slash
1982	"You Don't Own Me"	Silke Berlin
1983	"Konk Party"	Konk
1983	"Working on my Love"	Polyrock
1983	"AEIOU Sometimes Y"	EBN-OZN
1983	"The Hunter"	Randy Fredrix
1984	"Ground Zero"	Aku Aku
1985	"Changes of Heart"	Janice Payson
1985	"Call Me Mr. Telephone"	Cheyne
1987	"Let It Be with You"	Belouis Some
1987	"Animal Magic" (version 2: remix)	Belouis Some
1989	"Bamboleo" (version 3: Rockamerica remix)	Gipsy Kings
1990	"Love Child" (version 1: Rockamerica edit)	Sweet Sensation
1992	"Are You Ready to Fly?" (version 2: remix)	Rozalla
1993	"Sube Sube"	Marchin
1994	"Who's Wylin'"	Bushwackass
1996	"Universal"	John Mickie
1997	"Where Have All the Cowboys Gone?" (version 2: remix)	Paula Cole
1998	"Brimful of Asha" (version 2: Norman Cook remix)	Cornershop
2003	"Mas humilde y sin alarde"	X Alfonso
2003	"Que bueno baila usted"	X Alfonso
2010	"The Departed" - from film Solomon Kane	Sully Erna (Godsmack)
2014	"Poke" -	Gentleman Jake
2015	"Where Monarchs Go..."	Lawrence Blatt
2016	MAGGLE MOUT (radio) Video	BENZLY HYPE & SPRAGGA BENZ
