= Some Girls (Belouis Some song) =

Single by Belouis Some

from the album Belouis Some
- B-side: "Imagination"
- Released: 22 February 1988
- Length: 3:52
- Label: Parlophone
- Songwriters: Belouis Some; Carlos Alomar
- Producers: Gary Langan; Guy Fletcher (associate producer)

Belouis Some singles chronology
"Animal Magic" (1987)	"Some Girls" (1988)	"Something She Said" (1993)

"Some Girls" is a song by British singer and songwriter Belouis Some, released on 22 February 1988 as the third and final single from his second studio album, Belouis Some (1987). It was written by Belouis Some and Carlos Alomar, and produced by Gary Langan and Guy Fletcher (associate producer). "Some Girls" reached No. 76 in the UK and remained in the charts for four weeks. A music video, filmed in Milan, was produced to promote the song.

== Critical reception ==
Upon its release, Colin Irwin of Number One gave the song two out of five stars, and stated, "Poor ol' Belouis never did quite crack it, did he? Somehow he always seemed to be trying just that little bit too hard. This time around? Not with this slightly irritating whiney effort, methinks." Tim Nicholson of Record Mirror wrote, "I've never been able to get up much enthusiasm for Mr Some, but when I saw the title of his new single my heart started beating a little faster. Could it possibly be an inspired cover of Racey's classic Seventies hit? But then I played it. Not only is it not the song in question, but it probably doesn't even remember Racey it's so 'modern'."

Music & Media wrote, "Since the excellent 'Imagination' Belouis has been struggling to come up with something of the same calibre. This time he comes closer than previously with a bittersweet number that could do much to restore his flagging reputation." John Lee of the Huddersfield Daily Examiner commented, "The man seemingly destined never to make it big is at it again with a pleasing piece of delicately-crafted airplay material. Will this be the one?" In a review of Belouis Some, Scott Benarde of The Palm Beach Post described the song as a "somber ballad".

== Track listing ==
7-inch single

1. "Some Girls" – 3:52
2. "Imagination" – 4:00

12-inch single

1. "Some Girls" (Extended Version) – 6:15
2. "Imagination" (Can U Dig This Mix!) – 6:30
3. "Some Girls" (Dub Mix) – 4:07

12-inch single

1. "Some Girls" (Classical Version) – 4:43
2. "Imagination" (Can U Dig This Mix!) – 6:30
3. "Some Girls" (Extended Version) – 6:15

12-inch single (promo release)

1. "Some Girls" (Remix) – 6:15
2. "Imagination" (Can U Dig This Mix!) – 6:30

CD single

1. "Some Girls" (Radio Version) – 3:54
2. "Imagination" (Can U Dig This Mix!) – 4:50
3. "Some Girls" (Extended Version) – 6:19
4. "Some Girls" (Classical Version) – 4:43

== Personnel ==
"Some Girls"

- Belouis Some – vocals
- Carlos Alomar – guitar
- Lenny Pickett – saxophone
- Guy Fletcher – keyboards

Production

- Gary Langan – producer and arrangement on "Some Girls"
- Guy Fletcher – associate producer on "Some Girls"
- Bruce Forest, Frank Heller – additional production and mixing on "Some Girls"
- Peter Schwartz – additional keyboards on "Some Girls"
- Steve Thompson, Michael Barbiero – producers of "Imagination"
- Jamie Broomfield, Kevin O'Reordan and Phil Harding for PWL – mixing on "Imagination"

Other

- Accident – sleeve design
- Kevin Cummins – photography

== Charts ==
Chart (1988)	Peak position
UK Singles Chart	76
