= Jerusalem (Belouis Some song) =

Single by Belouis Some

from the album Some People
- B-side: "Target Practice"
- Released: 21 July 1986
- Label: Parlophone
- Songwriter: Belouis Some
- Producers: Pete Schwier; Steve Thompson; Michael Barbiero; Belouis Some

Belouis Some singles chronology
"Target Practice" (1986)	"Jerusalem" (1986)	"Let It Be with You" (1987)

"Jerusalem" is a song by British singer and songwriter Belouis Some, released on 21 July 1986 as the fourth and final single from his debut studio album, Some People (1985). It was written by Belouis Some, and produced by Pete Schwier, Steve Thompson, Michael Barbiero and Belouis Some. "Jerusalem" reached No. 98 in the UK and remained in the charts for one week.

== Background ==
In a 1984 interview with Debut, Belouis Some described the song's lyrics as "really heavy". He stated, "Songs like 'Jerusalem' are really heavy (lyrically that is). 'Jerusalem' is a bit depressing, it's just me trying to be clever, but I'm not trying to get any message across."

== Release ==
For its release as a single, "Jerusalem" was remixed by Thompson and Barbiero in May 1986. In addition to the standard 7-inch and 12-inch releases, a limited 7-inch gatefold sleeve double pack version was also issued. The bonus vinyl features "Round and Round" (from the Pretty in Pink soundtrack) as the A-side and "Stand Down" (from Some People) as the B-side.

== Critical reception ==
Upon its release as a single, Lola Borg of Smash Hits wrote, "It's smooth 'n' moody, a tinge on the pretentious side and sounds as though he's recruited David Bowie on vocals and Sooty on xylophone. And as for the lyrics - what on earth is he going on about?" Dave Ling of Number One stated, "'Jerusalem' sees a drop in pace after his last couple of re-releases. Unfortunately this strategy blows up in his face as this rather laboured song just forces home how average a vocalist our Nev really is." Roger Morton of Record Mirror commented, "Mr Some has tried for a big pop song here. One of those epic musclebound ballads, awash with splendid synthesised atmospherics. As an idea, it's wonderful. As a record, it plods."

Billy Mann of Sounds noted the "good structure" and "satisfying succession of verses and choruses", but considered it to be "terrifically lightweight" on the whole. He continued, "It bobs and weaves with the necessary technological make-up on but it doesn't get anywhere. Mr Some's voice is lazy. It refuses to lean over and pass the salt so it ultimately sounds like last week's dishwater. Feeble." John Lee of the Huddersfield Daily Examiner felt "Jerusalem" was Belouis Some's "weakest single so far" and added, "If a place in the upper echelons of pop's rather select hierarchy is what's desired, then he'll have to pull his finger out."

In a review of Some People, Voice of Youth Advocates said: "...on tracks such as the elaborate 'Jerusalem,' he seems to reveal his true affinity, a highly textured art rock". Lisa Clark of Smash Hits described the song as "haunting" and "David Bowie-inspired". David Marx of Debut described the song as "haunting" and "inevitable but fascinating".

== Track listing ==
7-inch single

1. "Jerusalem" - 5:47
2. "Target Practice" - 4:36

Double-pack 7-inch single

1. "Jerusalem" - 5:47
2. "Target Practice" - 4:36
3. "Round and Round" - 4:09
4. "Stand Down" - 3:11

12-inch single

1. "Jerusalem (Long Version)" - 5:39
2. "Jerusalem (Instrumental Version)" - 5:54
3. "Target Practice (Dance Mix)" - 6:01

== Personnel ==
Production

- Belouis Some - producer of "Jerusalem" and "Round and Round"
- Pete Schwier - producer of "Jerusalem" and "Stand Down"
- Steve Thompson, Michael Barbiero - producers of "Jerusalem" and "Target Practice", remixing on "Jerusalem" and "Stand Down"
- Jason Carsaro - remixing on "Target Practice"
- Bernard Edwards, Walter Samuel - producers of "Round and Round"
- Ian Little - producer of "Stand Down"

Other

- Accident - sleeve design
- Eric Watson - photography

== Charts ==
Chart (1986)	Peak position
UK Singles Chart	98
