= Belouis Some (album) =

Studio album by Belouis Some
- Released: 1987
- Genres: Pop; new wave
- Length: 40:15
- Labels: Parlophone, Capitol, EMI
- Producers: Gary Langan; Guy Fletcher (associate producer)

Belouis Some chronology
Some People (1985)	Belouis Some (1987)	Living Your Life (1993)

Belouis Some is the second studio album by the British new wave musician Belouis Some, which was released in 1987.

== Background ==
The release of Some's first album in 1985 led to two hits in the following year, "Imagination" and "Some People", both of which were Top 40 UK hits and Top 10 American Hot Dance Club Play hits. After his initial chart success and extensive touring, he appeared at the Knebworth Festival on a bill supporting Queen, with Big Country and Status Quo in August 1986. The late 1986 single, "Jerusalem", also peaked at #98 in the UK. Soon after, Some recorded his second album, Belouis Some, in New York, which was produced by Gary Langan and Guy Fletcher. Pete Townshend and Julian Lennon made guest appearances on the record, while Phil Harding mixed "Let It Be with You". Of the nine tracks, Some solely wrote five of the songs and co-wrote the rest, three of which were co-written with producer Guy Fletcher. "Some Girls" was co-written by Carlos Alomar.

The album was recorded at Right Track in New York City, and mixed at both the Eel Pie in Twickenham and Maison Rouge studios in London. Additional recording was at Counterpoint, Hit Factory, Roundhouse & Beat Factory.

Like his first album, Belouis Some did not make a chart appearance in the UK or the United States. "Let It Be with You" was the lead single from the album, and reached #53 in the UK chart. It fared better in the United States on the Hot Dance Club Play chart, where it reached #13. The second single, "Animal Magic", failed to make an appearance on the UK chart, but a remix version reached #6 on the Hot Dance Club Play chart. The third and final single, "Some Girls", was released exclusively in the UK during early 1988, and peaked at #76. This was the last chart entry Some made in the UK.

Some did not release his next and final studio album, Living Your Life, until 1993, although in 1989 he formed the band The Big Broadcast which toured the UK playing small venues and clubs.

== Release ==
Belouis Some was released by Parlophone/EMI Records in the UK, Europe, Australia and South Africa, and by Capitol Records in the US and Canada. It was released on vinyl LP, cassette and CD. The album remains out-of-print. The CD version of the album had a bonus track, the 12" extended remix of "Let It Be with You".

== Critical reception ==
On its release in the US, Billboard felt several of the songs on the album had "pop potential", including "My Body". Cash Box wrote, "Passionate, assured work from the blond soulster, who steps out smartly on his second LP. Full of fat brass, moody keys, Carlos Alomar's razor-thin guitar and the pouty vocals of Belouis Some, this wax packs some punch. Smooth with fangs, circa Simply Red or the Blow Monkeys." Scott Benarde of The Palm Beach Post commented, "It took Some doing but Belouis has improved his songwriting and followed up his debut with an album of polished, hook-filled romantic pop songs that commercial radio should find tempting. Y-NOT will add the breezy, hopping 'Stranger than Fiction', the somber ballad 'Some Girls' and the dreamy 'Animal Magic'."

Tim Blangger of The Morning Call wrote, "This LP is considerably toned down from his debut, which was filled with muscular rock and brassy funk. 'Let It Be with You' and 'Stranger than Fiction' are sensuous R&B cuts which retain a funky, jazzy feel while 'Dream Girl' and the remainder of Side 2 are 'dreamy' slower songs. This is a decent effort and worth a listen." Jeff Bunch of the Spokane Chronicle commented, "This effort is more consistent than his 1985 debut effort. But the limited range of his Billy Idol-like voice and overall weakness of his material makes one wonder whether he'll ever make it big."

== Track listing ==
All tracks are written by Belouis Some except where noted.

No.	Title	Writer(s)	Length
1.	"Let It Be with You"		3:30
2.	"Stranger than Fiction"		3:34
3.	"Some Girls"	Belouis Some, Carlos Alomar	4:41
4.	"Passion Play"	Belouis Some, Guy Fletcher	4:13
5.	"Animal Magic"	Belouis Some, Fletcher	4:33
6.	"Dream Girl"	Belouis Some, Fletcher	5:03
7.	"My Body"		4:09
8.	"Wind of Change"		4:48
9.	"What I See"		5:44

CD version bonus track
No.	Title	Length
10.	"Let It Be With You 12""	6:55

== Personnel ==
- Belouis Some – vocals
- Carlos Alomar, Chester Kamen (tracks 4, 6–7), Neal X (track 4), Pete Townshend (track 9) – guitar
- Carmine Rojas (tracks 1–2, 4, 6, 8–9), Gary Twigg (track 7) – bass guitar
- Guy Fletcher – keyboards
- Geoff Dugmore (tracks 1–2, 4–9) – drums
- Jimmy Maelen – percussion
- Lenny Pickett (track 3) – saxophone
- Earl Gardner – trumpet (tracks 1–2)
- The Borneo Horns – brass (tracks 1–2)
- Carlos Alomar, Gary Langan (tracks 4, 8), Geoff Dugmore (track 5), Gordon Grodie, Guy Fletcher (tracks 4, 8), Morris Michael (track 5), Robin Clark – backing vocals
- Gary Langan (tracks 1, 3, 9), Guy Fletcher (tracks 2, 4–8) – arrangements

Technical

- Gary Langan – producer, recording, mixing
- Guy Fletcher – associate producer
- Chris Ludwinski, Craig Vogel, Graeme Holdaway, John Palmer, Paul Borg, Rick Slater, Scott Mabuchi – engineer
- Phil Harding – mixing (track 1)
- Eric Watson – photography
- Accident – artwork design
