= Something She Said =

1993 single by Belouis Some

Single by Belouis Some

from the album Living Your Life
- Released: 30 August 1993
- Length: 4:04
- Label: Arista
- Songwriter: Belouis Some
- Producers: Geoff Dugmore; Nigel Butler

Belouis Some singles chronology
"Some Girls" (1988)	"Something She Said" (1993)	"Sometimes" (1993)

"Something She Said" is a song by British singer and songwriter Belouis Some, released on 30 August 1993 as the lead single from his third and final studio album, Living Your Life (1993). It was written by Some and produced by Geoff Dugmore and Nigel Butler. "Something She Said" peaked at number 106 in the UK singles chart.

== Background ==
After a period of fronting the band The Big Broadcast, Belouis Some returned to his next project as a solo artist, recording the album Living Your Life. "Something She Said" was released as the album's lead single on 30 August 1993. It was Some's first single since "Some Girls" was released in 1988. "Something She Said" failed to reach the top 100 of the UK singles chart, reaching its peak at number 106 in its debut week on the chart. Living Your Life was originally scheduled for release in the UK on 13 September 1993, but the album was subsequently shelved and only given a release in Germany in October 1993. In a 2023 interview, Some called it "a great single" and attributed its commercial failure, alongside that of the album, to Arista Records' and BMG's lack of interest in promoting it.

== Music video ==
The song's accompanying music video was shot in Normandy, France.

== Critical reception ==
Upon its release as a single, The Arbroath Herald awarded "Something She Said" a seven out of ten rating, with the reviewers calling it "a bit of a grower". They continued, "At first hearing, it's a fairly ordinary ballad, with drums and vocal and lots of other ingredients that we'd heard a hundred times before. After two or three hearings, however, the tune began to stick in our minds, and we feel it may be a grower to watch." Jim Whiteford, writing for the Dundee Evening Telegraph, noted the "Beatlish" and John Lennon-styled sound on what he described as "quite good and different for '93". Andrew Hirst of the Huddersfield Daily Examiner remarked, "The 60s psychedelia swagger is punctuated by some incisive guitar work. It all works rather well."

A reviewer for the Sunderland Echo felt that the "funk rock dance track" was "not in the same class as the excellent 'Imagination' which first brought him to the public's attention in the 1980s". John Greenwood of the Halifax Evening Courier was negative in his review, describing it as "bog-standard pop" and asking "Why has this talentless individual been given another chance? Why?"

== Track listings ==
7–inch (UK and Europe) and cassette single (UK)

1. "Something She Said" – 4:04
2. "Something She Said" (Ambient Mix) – 8:22

12–inch single (UK)

1. "Something She Said" (12") – 5:38
2. "Something She Said" (Dub) – 4:59
3. "Something She Said" (Ambient Mix) – 8:22
4. "Something She Said" (Ragga Mix) – 6:39

CD single (UK)

1. "Something She Said" – 4:04
2. "Something She Said" (Ambient Mix) – 8:22
3. "Something She Said" (Dub) – 4:59
4. "Something She Said" (Ragga Dub) – 6:39
5. "Something She Said" (12") – 5:38

CD single (Germany)

1. "Something She Said" (Radio Version) – 3:52
2. "Something She Said" (Instrumental Version) – 4:25
3. "Something She Said" (Album Version) – 4:20

== Personnel ==
"Something She Said"

- Belouis Some – lead vocals
- Karl Hyde – guitar
- Steve Barnacle – bass
- Geoff Dugmore – drums and programming, backing vocals
- Nigel Butler – programming, backing vocals
- Trippy Guru Mamas – backing vocals

Production

- Geoff Dugmore – production, mixing
- Nigel Butler – production, mixing
- Tim Russell – engineering (radio, instrumental and album versions, Ambient Mix and Ragga Mix)
- Coldcut (Matt Black and Jonathan More) – additional production and restructure (12" and Dub)
- Paul Rabiger – engineering (12" and Dub)

Other

- Chris Quayle – sleeve design
- Kate Martin – photography

== Charts ==
Chart (1993)	Peak position
UK Singles Chart (OCC)	106
