= Let It Be with You =

Single by Belouis Some

from the album Belouis Some
- Released: 27 April 1987
- Length: 3:34
- Label: Parlophone
- Songwriter: Belouis Some
- Producers: Gary Langan, Guy Fletcher

Belouis Some singles chronology
"Jerusalem" (1986)	"Let It Be with You" (1987)	"Animal Magic" (1987)

"Let It Be with You" is a song by British musician Belouis Some, released on 27 April 1987 as the lead single from his self-titled second album. The song reached No. 53 on the UK Singles Chart, and No. 13 on the U.S. Hot Dance Club Play chart.

Two music videos were filmed to promote the single, with the UK and European version being shot in London. The North American version was shot in New York, directed by Willie Slax and produced by Julian Ludlow for 4-D Productions. It achieved breakout rotation on MTV.

== Critical reception ==
On its release, Andy Strickland of Record Mirror described "Let It Be with You" as "all effort and no content" and a "brilliantly executed piece of nothing", but predicted it would be a hit. He added, "Belouis has learnt every lesson in the funky pop song book and stored them meticulously in his bleached bonce. Trouble is, he hasn't an original thought to add of his own, and that means big tedium for the old lug 'oles I'm afraid." John Lee of the Huddersfield Daily Examiner considered the song to be "flaccid and far less well-equipped to become a hit" in comparison to Some's 1986 hit single "Imagination". He added that Some "seems destined to be bottom of the chart ballast before inevitably sinking into the swamp of obscurity".

In the US, Cash Box listed "Let It Be with You" as one of their "feature picks" during June 1987 and described it as a "danceable, feverish single". Billboard wrote, "Some must have been listening to a few Chic records; R&B dance base is complemented with lyrical and vocal insolence." In a review of Belouis Some, Ernie Long of The Morning Call described the song as a "sensuous R&B cut which retain[s] a funky, jazzy feel".

== Charts ==
Chart (1987)	Peak position
UK Singles Chart	53
U.S. Billboard Dance/Club Play Songs Chart	13
