= Romanticide =

Romanticide may refer to:

- "Romanticide", a song from the Nightwish album Once
- "Romanticide", a song by Combo Audio
- "Love Is War (Romanticide)", a song by September Mourning from their debut album Melancholia
