= Let Me Love You for Tonight =

1988 song by Kariya

Single by Kariya
- Released: 1988
- Label: Sleeping Bag Records
- Songwriter(s): Jerry Ferrer
- Producer(s): Bob Ferrer; Jerry Ferrer

Kariya singles chronology
"Let Me Love You for Tonight" (1988)	"I Can't Wait" (1990)

"Let Me Love You for Tonight" is a song by American singer Kariya, which was released in 1988 as her debut, non-album single by Sleeping Bag Records. It was written by Jerry Ferrer, and produced by Bob and Jerry Ferrer.

== Kariya version ==
The song was a success across the US and European club scene during 1988 and also in the UK when it was re-released in 1989. It reached No. 15 on the US Billboard Hot Dance Music Club Play chart in December 1988 and No. 44 on the UK Singles Chart in July 1989.

=== Critical reception ===
On its release, Billboard described the track as having a "Latin/pop rhythmic bed" and an "aggravated female vocal". In a review of the 1989 UK re-release, Simon Lloyd of the Reading Evening Post wrote: ""Let Me Love You Tonight" is a rare specimen indeed. A house tune without that God-awful jangling piano bit that seems to find its way into almost every "black" song you hear these days. Kariya has that distinctive housey feel, but the difference is hers is frighteningly contagious."

=== Track listing ===
==== 1988 release ====
- 7" single (US promo)
1. "Let Me Love You for Tonight" (Hip-Hop Version) – 3:28
2. "Let Me Love You for Tonight" (House Version) – 3:26
- 12" single (US release)
1. "Let Me Love You for Tonight" (Hip-Hop Club Version) – 5:12
2. "Let Me Love You for Tonight" (Radical Hip-Hop Dub) – 5:28
3. "Let Me Love You for Tonight" (Hip-Hop Radio Version) – 3:28
4. "Let Me Love You for Tonight" (House Club Version) – 6:23
5. "Let Me Love You for Tonight" (Acapella) – 2:49
6. "Let Me Love You for Tonight" (House Radio Version) – 3:26
- 12" single (UK release)
1. "Let Me Love You for Tonight" (Hip-Hop Club Version) – 5:12
2. "Let Me Love You for Tonight" (Hip-Hop Radio Version) – 3:28
3. "Let Me Love You for Tonight" (House Club Version) – 6:23
4. "Let Me Love You for Tonight" (House Radio Version) – 3:26

==== 1989 release ====
- 7" single (UK release)
1. "Let Me Love You for Tonight" (Hip-Hop Version) – 3:28
2. "Let Me Love You for Tonight" (House Version) – 3:26
- 12" single (UK release)
1. "Let Me Love You for Tonight" (The "Pumped Up" Mix) – 7:27
2. "Let Me Love You for Tonight" (Original Version) – 6:23
3. "Let Me Love You for Tonight" (The "Pumped Up" Mix - Vocal Dub) – 6:00
- 12" single (UK and German release)
1. "Let Me Love You for Tonight" (7" Mix) – 3:33
2. "Let Me Love You for Tonight" (The "Pumped Up" Mix) – 7:27
3. "Let Me Love You for Tonight" (Original Version) – 6:23

=== Charts ===
Chart (1988–89)	Peak position
UK Singles (OCC)	44
US Hot Dance Music 12-inch Singles Sales (Billboard)	25
US Hot Dance Music Club Play (Billboard)	15

Chart (1994)	Peak position
UK Club Chart (Music Week)	74

== Belouis Some version ==
"Let Me Love You for Tonight"

Single by Belouis Some
- Released: 1995
- Length: 3:22
- Label: Paris Trading
- Songwriter(s): Jerry Ferrer
- Producer(s): Richard Stannard; Matt Rowe

Belouis Some singles chronology
"Imagination (remix)" (1995)	"Let Me Love You for Tonight" (1995)

In 1995, British singer Belouis Some released his own version of "Let Me Love You for Tonight" as a non-album single. It was released in the UK by Paris Trading. Some's version was produced by Richard Stannard (of Biffco) and Matt Rowe. A music video was filmed to promote the single, which was shot in London.

The song was Belouis Some's final release of new material. The commercial failure of his third studio album Living Your Life in 1993 led the singer to decide to walk away from the music industry. He was persuaded to record "Let Me Love You for Tonight", but it was also a commercial failure. Speaking to Chris Cordani on Revenge of the 80s in 2019, Belouis Some revealed: "I did one more single that I was persuaded to do. I was not happy about this. It wasn't my song, I hated doing it. It came out, nothing happened and I thought 'that's it, I've had enough'."

=== Track listing ===
- 12" and CD single
1. "Let Me Love You for Tonight" (Radio Edit) – 3:22
2. "Let Me Love You for Tonight" (Extended Biffco Mix) – 5:46
3. "Let Me Love You for Tonight" (Dominic's Groove Mix) – 4:33
4. "Let Me Love You for Tonight" (Continental Club Mix) – 5:44
5. "Let Me Love You for Tonight" (Instrumental Mix) – 3:43
