= Some People (Belouis Some song) =

Single by Belouis Some

from the album Some People
- B-side: "Walk Away"
- Released: 8 July 1985
- Recorded: 1984
- Genre: New wave; synth-pop
- Length: 4:00
- Label: Parlophone
- Songwriter: Belouis Some
- Producers: Steve Thompson, Michael Barbiero

Belouis Some singles chronology
"Imagination" (1985)	"Some People" (1985)	""Target Practice" (re-release)" (1986)

"Some People" is a song by British musician Belouis Some, released on 8 July 1985 as the third single from his 1985 debut album of the same name. A reissue of the song on 24 March 1986 reached the top 40 in the UK, peaking at No. 33 on the UK Singles Chart in April 1986. In the US, the song reached No. 67 on the Billboard Hot 100.

== Writing ==
Belouis Some wrote "Some People" while "very drunk in a studio with one finger on the piano".

== Music video ==
The song's accompanying music video was directed by Storm Thorgerson, who also directed the controversial video to Belouis Some's earlier hit, "Imagination". The video was shot in July 1985 on the east coast of England at Aldeburgh and Southwold in Suffolk, and Great Yarmouth Pleasure Beach in Norfolk.

After the music video was filmed, watchmaker Swatch paid for a second take which included extras dressed in Swatch clothing. The company hoped that Swatch would become so associated with the song that when the music video aired, people thought of Swatch even though the product was not present. "It becomes a Swatch video," said Nancy Kadner, director of advertising for the Swiss-based company.

== Critical reception ==
Upon its reissue in 1986, Tamsin Fontes of the Mid Sussex Times noted that, although the song "lack[s] the punch" of "Imagination", it should "do equally well" and "possess[es] a good, catchy melody and infectiously singalong lyrics".

== Charts ==
Chart (1985)	Peak position
South African Singles Chart	9
UK Singles Chart	83
US Billboard Dance/Club Play Songs	8
US Billboard Hot 100	67

Chart (1986)	Peak position
Irish Singles Chart	21
UK Singles Chart	33

== Cover versions ==
In 1986, Murray Head released his version of the song as a single through Virgin. The single was unintentionally released around the same time as the 1986 reissue of Some's version. Head told the Sunday Mirror in April 1986: "By the time we discovered Belouis Some was releasing his version it was too late. You don't set out to have a chart battle because inevitably both sides lose. There's nothing I can do about the clash. It's justifiably his song." Head's version did not enter the UK Singles Chart.
