= Some People (Belouis Some album) =

Studio album by Belouis Some
- Released: 3 April 1985
- Genres: New wave, pop
- Length: 38:24
- Labels: Parlophone, Capitol, EMI
- Producers: Pete Schwier (tracks 1–2, 7–9); Steve Thompson (tracks 1, 3–6); Michael Barbiero (tracks 1, 3–6); Ian Little (tracks 2, 7–9)

Belouis Some chronology
Some People (1985)	Belouis Some (1987)

Some People is the debut studio album from British musician Belouis Some, released in April 1985 in the US and August 1985 in the UK.

== Background ==
Neville Keighley began performing as Belouis Some in 1983. He would sign with Parlophone Records that year and began recording his studio album soon after. Recording of Some People began at Good Earth, Maison Rouge and Air Studios in London, with Ian Little and Pete Schwier at the producers' helm. In late 1984, recording continued at New York with producers Steve Thompson and Michael Barbiero. Some People was released in 1985. It did not chart.

Preceding the album, the first single "Target Practice" was released in June 1984, but failed to chart. In March 1985, "Imagination" was released, and saw some chart success across various countries, including reaching #50 in the UK and #88 in America. The album's third single, "Some People", followed in June, and reached #33 in the UK and #67 in America. Both "Imagination" and "Some People" were also successful on the US Hot Dance Club Songs chart, reaching #4 and #8 respectively. In January 1986, "Imagination" was re-issued, reaching #17 in the UK; however, a March re-issue of "Some People" failed to re-chart. In July, the final single, "Jerusalem", was released, reaching #98 in the UK. A re-issue of "Target Practice" would also reach #16 in South Africa in May 1986.

A music video for "Imagination", directed by Storm Thorgerson, was met with some controversy as it featured full frontal nudity. The music video for "Some People" was filmed in Aldeburgh, Suffolk.

== Release ==
The album was released by Parlophone/EMI on vinyl in various countries, including the UK, France, Italy, the Netherlands, Greece, Japan, Argentina and South Africa. In the US and Canada, it was released by Capitol Records. Jugoton/Parlophone released the album in Yugoslavia. Although the album wasn't commercially released on CD, a UK promo version appeared on the format, which was made in Japan and released by EMI.

Later in 2009, Cherry Pop would remaster and reissue the album on CD. For the release, Cherry Pop mastered the album from vinyl, leading to complaints over the sound quality. A second edition of the CD was released by the label in 2010.

== Critical reception ==
Professional ratings
Review scores
Source	Rating
Smash Hits	7.5/10 stars
Number One	2/3 stars
Record Mirror	3/5 stars

On its release, Lisa Clark of Smash Hits considered Some People to be an "excellently put together pop/funk collaboration", adding "Although basically a pop record, the funky production slants the songs quite differently – sometimes like the mega-brilliant 'Imagination' with its sneery vocals, and sometimes like the haunting, David Bowie-inspired 'Jerusalem'." Nick Adams of Number One stated, "Belouis Some has already released a couple of strong singles and the rest of his songs are equally dramatic – big, thumping melody links punched out on synths with saxes and backing vocalists making sure you don't forget the tune. Belouis' phrasing often lapses into Bowie's London camp, and too many of the songs are striving to be 'Let's Dance Part 2'. Nevertheless, a promising debut." Eleanor Levy of Record Mirror commented, "It's a good album if not a great one, but with the backing he's got - plus a certain amount of swoon-inducing charisma from the man himself - this truly is the future of rock 'n' roll."

Brian Chin of Billboard wrote, "Some People is a really up-to-date pop production, with one attractive and danceable cut after another. Best cuts are the pop title cut, and the rockier 'Target Practice,' along with the surfacing 'Imagination'." Helen Metella of the Edmonton Journal described the album as "thoroughly accessible, staunchly commercial pop, often vocally reminiscent of Bowie". She praised the "ambitious but simply stated lyrics" and Some's ability to "emote convincingly", but noted he was "not an especially strong singer". Metella concluded, "This debut [is not] an awesome masterpiece but it's a respectable effort from someone who should be reckoned with."

== Track listing ==
All tracks written and composed by Belouis Some.

No.	Title	Length
1.	"Some People"	4:01
2.	"Stand Down"	3:34
3.	"Imagination"	3:35
4.	"Walk Away"	3:39
5.	"Aware of You"	3:43
6.	"Target Practice"	4:35
7.	"Have You Ever Been in Love"	4:04
8.	"Tail Lights"	5:42
9.	"Jerusalem"	5:49

Cherry Pop CD bonus tracks
No.	Title	Length
10.	"Imagination" (Dance Mix)	5:31
11.	"Stand Down" (Live Version)	3:18
12.	"Some People" (Extended)	7:38
13.	"Some People" (Dub Mix)	6:36
14.	"Jerusalem" (Instrumental Version)	5:54
15.	"Target Practice" (Bullseye Mix)	6:01

== Charts ==
=== Singles ===
Imagination

Chart (1985)	Peak position
Belgian Singles Chart (V)	40
Canadian Adult Contemporary Chart	25
German Singles Chart	48
Italian Singles Chart	7
South African Singles Chart	13
Swiss Singles Chart	30
UK Singles Chart	50
U.S. Billboard Dance/Club Play Songs Chart	4
U.S. Billboard Hot 100 Chart	88

Chart (1986)	Peak position
New Zealand Singles Chart	38
Irish Singles Chart	16
UK Singles Chart	17

Some People

Chart (1985)	Peak position
Italian Singles Chart	34
South African Singles Chart	9
UK Singles Chart	33
U.S. Billboard Dance/Club Play Songs Chart	8
U.S. Billboard Hot 100 Chart	67

Chart (1986)	Peak position
Irish Singles Chart	21

Target Practice

Chart (1986)	Peak position
South African Singles Chart	16

Jerusalem

Chart (1986)	Peak position
UK Singles Chart	98

== Personnel ==
- Belouis Some – vocals
- Carlos Alomar – guitar, backing vocals, arrangement
- Chester Kamen, Earl Slick – guitar
- Guy Fletcher – keyboards, backing vocals, arrangement
- Dave Lebolt, Jack Waldman – keyboards
- Bernard Edwards, Carmine Rojas, Gary Twigg – bass guitar
- Alan Childs, Andy Duncan, Tony Thompson – drums
- Jimmy Maelen – percussion
- Rick Bell – saxophone (track 3)
- Gary Barnacle – saxophone (track 8)
- Diva Gray – backing vocals
- Frank Simms, Kurt Yahjin, Robin Clark – backing vocals

Technical

- Pete Schwier – producer (tracks 1–2, 6–9), engineer (all tracks)
- Steve Thompson – producer (tracks 1, 3–6), mixing (tracks 2, 6, 9)
- Michael Barbiero – producer (tracks 1, 3–6), mixing (tracks 2, 6, 9), engineer (all tracks)
- Ian Little – producer (tracks 2, 7–9)
- Alexander Haas, Carb Canelle, Rob Trillo – tape operators
- Richard Haughton – photography
- XL Design – sleeve
