= The Trouble with... Harry =

Studio album by Harry
- Released: 12 April 2003; 27 December 2021 (20th Anniversary Remaster)
- Genre: Alternative rock
- Length: 52:03; 48:49 (20th Anniversary Remaster)
- Label: Telstar Records; Diamonds x Dragons (20th Anniversary Remaster)

Harry chronology
The Trouble with... Harry (2003)	Songs from the Edge (2007)

20th Anniversary Remastered Edition

The Trouble with... Harry was the debut album by British musician Harry (aka Dirty Harry). It was released on 21 April 2003 but failed to reach the UK album top 75.

The album encountered numerous delays during its recording and production, following a lawsuit with Clint Eastwood over copyright issues with the name 'Dirty Harry', it had to be re-recorded.

The album contains 13 tracks, including the singles "So Real" and "Follow Me" as well as two older singles recorded under the name, Dirty Harry, "Eye" and "Nothing Really Matters". "Push It (Real Good)", a sampling of the Salt-N-Pepa song "Push It" and a cover of Belouis Some's "Imagination" which appeared on Harry's "Under the Covers" EP were also included on the album.

== Track listing ==
No.	Title	Length
1.	"Goddess on the Floor"	2:44
2.	"10 Things"	4:13
3.	"So Real"	3:29
4.	"Follow Me"	4:24
5.	"Valley"	5:02
6.	"Underground"	2:52
7.	"Eye"	4:31
8.	"Push It (Real Good)"	4:00
9.	"I Do What I Do"	4:01
10.	"Taste Like Kisses"	3:33
11.	"Heroin"	3:13
12.	"Nothing Really Matters"	6:15
13.	"Imagination"	3:14

A remixed and remastered 20th Anniversary Edition was released in December 2021, with a number of tracks from the original removed and replaced by remixes and B-sides.

20th Anniversary Remastered Edition
No.	Title	Length
1.	"Eye (Youth Mix)"	4:30
2.	"Nothing Really Matters (Chris Lord-Alge Mix)"	4:07
3.	"10 Things"	4:13
4.	"So Real"	3:31
5.	"Follow Me"	4:24
6.	"Valley"	5:03
7.	"Underground"	2:53
8.	"Imagination"	3:40
9.	"So Real (Jacknife Lee Remix)"	3:20
10.	"Nothing Really Matters"	6:15
11.	"She's in Parties"	3:40

== Critical response ==
The album received generally positive reviews. The Guardian described the album as a "not-unappealing blend of suspenders, silliness and Siouxsie Sioux", giving it 3 out of a possible 5. Kerrang! magazine gave it 4 out of 5, saying "If you give your heart to a rock goddess this year, let it be Harry."

- "An icon-in-waiting" – The Guardian
- "She rocks hard" – The Independent On Sunday
- "Platinum Rock-goddess-in-waiting" – Kerrang! with KKKK (4 star) Review
- "The no-cock revolution just found its new ringleader" – NME
- "A remarkable debut" – The Fly
