= List of British Invasion artists =

The following is a list of bands and artists that were involved with the British Invasion music phenomenon that occurred between 1964 and 1967 in the United States. (Artists shown in boldface are Rock and Roll Hall of Fame inductees.)

- Adam Faith
- Alan Price
- **The Animals**
- The Applejacks
- The Attack
- The Bachelors
- **The Beatles**
- **Bee Gees**
- Billy J. Kramer with the Dakotas
- **Cat Stevens**
- Chad & Jeremy
- Chris Farlowe
- Cilla Black
- **Cream**
- The Creation
- Crispian St. Peters
- **The Dave Clark Five**
- Dave Dee, Dozy, Beaky, Mick & Tich
- **Donovan**
- **Dusty Springfield**
- Engelbert Humperdinck
- The Flower Pot Men
- The Fortunes
- The Foundations
- The Fourmost
- Freddie and the Dreamers
- Georgie Fame
- Gerry and the Pacemakers
- The Herd
- Herman's Hermits
- **The Hollies**
- The Honeycombs
- The Hullaballoos
- Ian Whitcomb
- The Ivy League
- John Mayall & the Bluesbreakers
- Jonathan King
- **The Kinks**
- Long John Baldry
- Lulu
- Manfred Mann
- Marianne Faithfull
- The Merseybeats/The Merseys
- The Mojos
- **The Moody Blues**
- The Move
- The Nashville Teens
- The New Vaudeville Band
- Peter and Gordon
- Petula Clark
- **Pink Floyd**
- The Pretty Things
- Procol Harum
- The Poets
- The Rockin' Berries
- **The Rolling Stones**
- Sandie Shaw
- The Searchers
- Shirley Bassey
- The Silkie
- **Small Faces**
- The Sorrows
- The Spencer Davis Group
- The Swinging Blue Jeans
- Them
- Tom Jones
- **Traffic**
- The Tremeloes
- The Troggs
- The Undertakers
- Unit 4 + 2
- **Van Morrison**
- Wayne Fontana and the Mindbenders
- **The Who**
- **The Yardbirds**
- **The Zombies**

== See also ==
- British Invasion
- List of Second British Invasion artists
