= Songs from the Edge =

Studio album by Dirty Harry
- Released: 2007
- Genre: Rock
- Length: 43:43
- Label: A Wolf At Your Door Records

Dirty Harry chronology
The Trouble with... Harry (2003)	Songs from the Edge (2007)

Songs from the Edge is the second studio album by British musician Dirty Harry (formerly known as Harry).

It was recorded as the follow-up to The Trouble with... Harry (2003) and Produced by multi-platinum, Grammy-nominated producer Luke Ebbin, who has worked with artists including Bon Jovi and Rival Schools. The album features Curt Schneider engineering and playing bass guitar, David Levita on guitar, and Victor Indrizzo on drums.

== Track listing ==
1. "Frayed at the Edges"
2. "Takes One to Know One"
3. "Welcome to What Is Meant to Be"
4. "Do You Remember Those Days?"
5. "Dirty Boys & Girls"
6. "Stepping Stones"
7. "Drunks of London Town"
8. "Let Go of Me"
9. "Fake It Like You"
10. "Not That Girl / Been Down"
11. "Sweet Sound of Rock'n'roll"
