= J.J. Belle =

British session musician

- Born: 17 October 1955
- Died: 26 November 2004
- Instrument: Guitar

J.J. Belle (born Roger Elvidge Belle, French Guiana, 17 October 1955 – 26 November 2004) was a renowned British session musician, mostly known for his work as a guitarist. Artists he played for included Marc Almond, Fish (playing guitar on the US leg and September UK dates of his 1997 Sunsets on Empire tour), Debbie Harry, Johnny Hates Jazz, Grace Jones, George Michael, Madonna, Dusty Springfield, Tina Turner and Bucks Fizz - with a song-defining solo at the end of "The Company You Keep". He also played on Belouis Some's 1993 album Living Your Life. Belle also frequently worked with Pet Shop Boys, who declared he helped define their sound, in a statement following his death from cancer in 2004.
