= Lost 80's Live =

Concert tour series

- Genre: New wave, electronic, synth-pop
- Location: Touring Concert
- Inaugurated: August 23, 2002
- Website: lost80slive.com

Lost 80's Live is a concert tour featuring a collection of musical artists from the time period of the 1980s that perform a live concert. The tour was founded in 2002 and usually consists of 10 to 12 bands and artists in each tour that span the music genres of new wave, synth-pop, rock, pop and electronic music.

Bands and artists that have performed in the Lost 80's Live concert tour include ABC, Tony Hadley, Thompson Twins' Tom Bailey, Thomas Dolby, A Flock of Seagulls, the Tubes, Men Without Hats, Musical Youth, the Romantics, Animotion, Nu Shooz, Modern English, Gene Loves Jezebel, Belouis Some, Wang Chung, Cutting Crew, Berlin, the English Beat, Naked Eyes, Missing Persons, When in Rome UK, Bow Wow Wow, the Motels, and the Vapors.

== Show highlights ==
May 29, 2007: House of Blues presents Lost 80's Live featuring Animotion, When in Rome, Dramarama, and Gene Loves Jezebel.

April 25, 2008: Lost 80's Live goes international playing the Araneta Coliseum in the Philippines.

May 23, 2009: Lost 80's Live plays the 106.9 The Point B-Day Bash at Sam Houston Race Park in Houston, Texas with A Flock of Seagulls, Dramarama, Gene Loves Jezebel, and When in Rome.

August 24, 2013: KROQ and Sirius XM 1st Wave radio DJ Richard Blade was booked to host the Lost 80's Live in Long Beach, California. Since then, he has hosted numerous Lost 80's Live shows in California and Las Vegas.

August 26, 2014: Animotion were highlighted in the news and played the Lost 80's Live on September 3, 2014, at the Wild Horse Casino in Chandler, Arizona alongside Men Without Hats, Naked Eyes, A Flock of Seagulls, The Flirts, Bow Wow Wow, and Dramarama.

October 16, 2015: Lost 80's Live celebrated its 10th anniversary at the House of Blues in Anaheim, CA with a concert featuring Wang Chung, Animotion, Gene Loves Jezebel, Dramarama, Naked Eyes, and Boys Don't Cry with Annabella Lwin of Bow Wow Wow. Special performances were made by Clive Farrington and Rob Juarez of When in Rome, Anything Box, the original Mary Jane Girls, Maxi and Cheri with a special appearance and performance by Benny Mardones.
