= Second British Invasion =

1980s cultural movement

- Part of the 1980s in the United States and United Kingdom
- Duration: 1982–mid-1980s
- Location: United States, United Kingdom
- Cause: Rise of British synth-pop and New Pop artists in U.S. pop music charts

The Second British Invasion was a sharp increase in the popularity of British pop music, mainly by synth-pop and New Pop artists, in the United States. It began in the summer of 1982, peaked in 1983, and continued throughout much of the 1980s. The MTV music video channel began in 1981. Its popularity was the main catalyst for the second British Invasion. According to Rolling Stone, British acts brought a "revolution in sound and style" to the US.

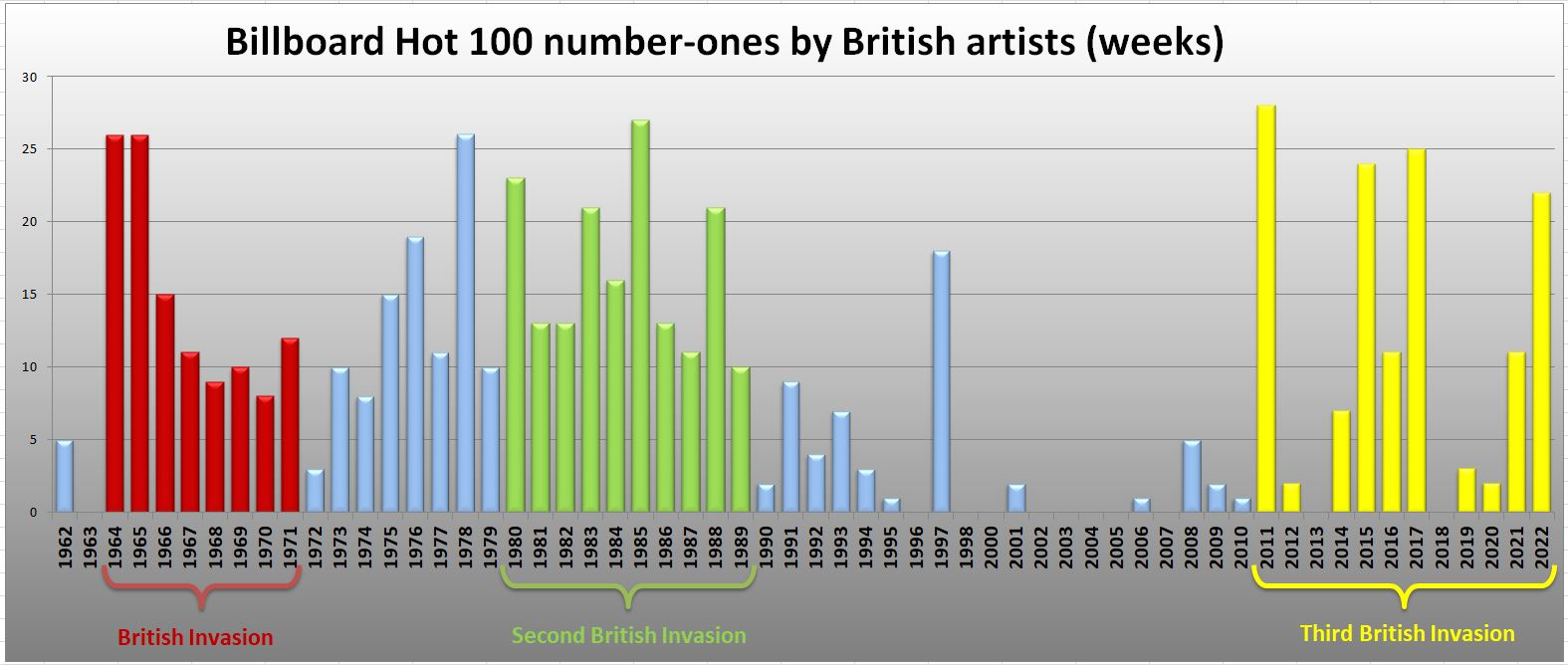
Chart of Billboard Hot 100 number-ones by British artists, by weeks

During the late 1980s, glam metal and dance music replaced Second Invasion acts atop the US charts.

== Background ==
In the late 1970s and early 1980s, music from the United Kingdom was informed by the after-effects of the punk/new wave revolution. In 1979, "Roxanne" by the Police cracked the American Top 40, followed by the more modest chart successes of Elvis Costello, Sniff 'n' the Tears, the Pretenders, Gary Numan, Squeeze, and Joe Jackson; the latter had a new wave hit with "Is She Really Going Out with Him?" Scripps-Howard news service has described this success as an early stage of the invasion.

Music videos, which had been a staple of British music television programmes for about five years, evolved into image-conscious short films. At the same time, pop and rock music in the U.S. was undergoing a creative slump due to several factors, including audience fragmentation and the effects of the anti-disco backlash that reached its peak with Disco Demolition Night. Videos did not exist for most hits by US acts, and those that did were usually composed of footage from concert performances. When the cable music channel MTV launched on 1 August 1981, it had little choice but to play a large number of music videos from British new wave acts. The Buggles' 1979 hit "Video Killed the Radio Star" was the first music video shown on MTV in the U.S. To the surprise of the music industry, when MTV became available in a local market, record sales by acts played solely on the channel increased immediately and listeners phoned radio stations requesting to hear them. Also in 1981, Los Angeles radio station KROQ-FM began the Rock of the '80s format, which would make it the most popular station in that city. With British artists featuring heavily on the station, Rick Carroll of KROQ states, "There wasn't American product worthy of being played every three hours, so we had to look and listen to British imports to fill the void." In 2011, The Guardian felt that the launch of MTV (one of the paper's "50 key events in the history of pop music") played "a huge part" in the second British invasion.

More hints of the impending invasion were observed in 1981 on the dance charts. Only seven of the top thirty groups of the dance rock chart Rockpool were of American origin, while later in the year, 12-inch singles by British groups began appearing on the Billboard Disco chart. The trend was particularly strong in Manhattan where import records and the British music press were convenient to obtain and where the New York Rocker warned that "Anglophilia" was hurting US underground acts.

== The Invasion ==
Some fascinating new music began arriving on these shores; it was dubbed electropop, because electronic instrumentation — mainly synthesizers and syndrums — was used to craft pop songs. "Pop Muzik" by M was one of the first. There was a gradual accumulation of worthy electropop discs, though they were still mostly heard only in rock discos. But in 1981, the floodgates opened, and "new music" at last made a mighty splash. The breakthrough song was "Don't You Want Me" by the Human League.

— Anglomania: The Second British Invasion, by Parke Puterbaugh for Rolling Stone, November 1983.

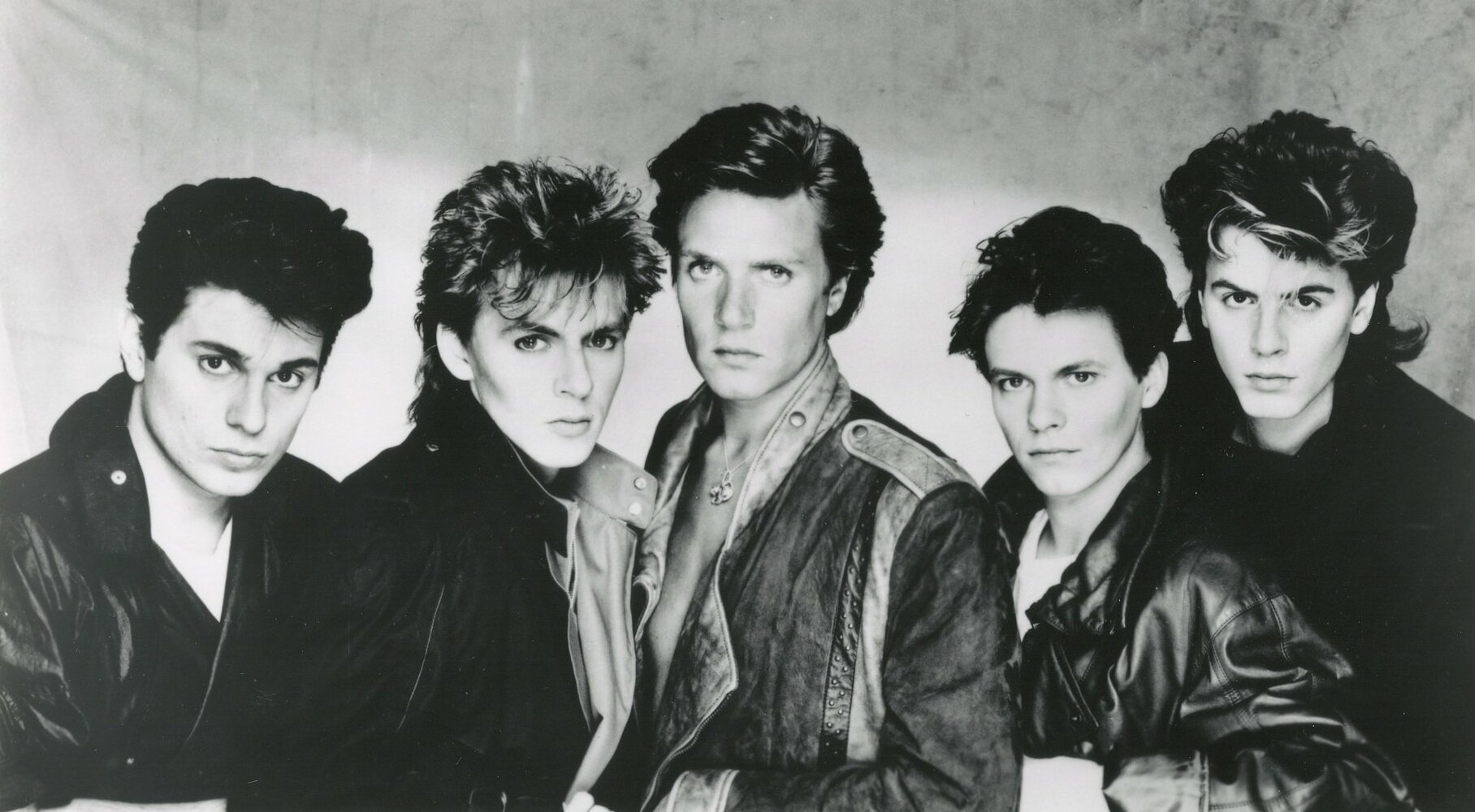
Duran Duran (pictured in 1983) were one of the earliest British New Pop groups to achieve mainstream success in the summer of 1982. Their second studio album Rio is credited with helping kickstart the second British Invasion, spending eleven weeks within the top ten of the Billboard 200 in 1983.

On 4 May 1982, Duran Duran released their second single "Hungry Like the Wolf" from the group's second studio album, Rio. The song peaked at number five on the UK Top 40 chart in late June 1982, and its accompanying music video received frequent rotation on MTV by early July. Duran Duran's subsequent singles, "Save a Prayer" and "Rio", also did exceptionally well, peaking at number two and number nine on the UK Top 40 chart, respectively. On 3 July 1982, the Human League's "Don't You Want Me" started a three-week reign on top of the Billboard Hot 100. The song got considerable boost from MTV, and has been described by The Village Voice as "pretty unmistakably the moment the Second British Invasion, spurred by MTV, kicked off". "Tainted Love" by Soft Cell also spent a record-breaking 43 weeks on the Hot 100.

The September 1982 arrival of MTV in the media capitals of New York City and Los Angeles led to widespread positive publicity for the new "video era". By the fall, "I Ran (So Far Away)" by A Flock of Seagulls, the first successful song that owed almost everything to video, had entered the Billboard top ten. Duran Duran's glossy videos would come to symbolise the power of MTV. Billy Idol became an MTV staple with 1983's "White Wedding" and 1984's "Eyes Without a Face", and his second studio album Rebel Yell (1983) sold two million copies. Pop rock songs that topped the charts included Bonnie Tyler's "Total Eclipse of the Heart", John Waite's "Missing You", and Robert Palmer's "Addicted to Love". Spandau Ballet's ballad "True" became one of the most played songs in US history. Girl group Bananarama had hits with "Cruel Summer" and "Venus", the latter reaching number one.

New music became an umbrella term used by the music industry to describe young, mostly British, androgynous, and technologically oriented artists such as Culture Club and Eurythmics. Many of the Second Invasion artists started their careers in the punk era and desired to bring change to a wider audience, resulting in music that, while having no specific sound, was characterized by a risk-taking spirit within the context of pop music. Rock-oriented acts that knew how to use video, such as Def Leppard, Big Country and Simple Minds, became part of the new influx of music from Britain.

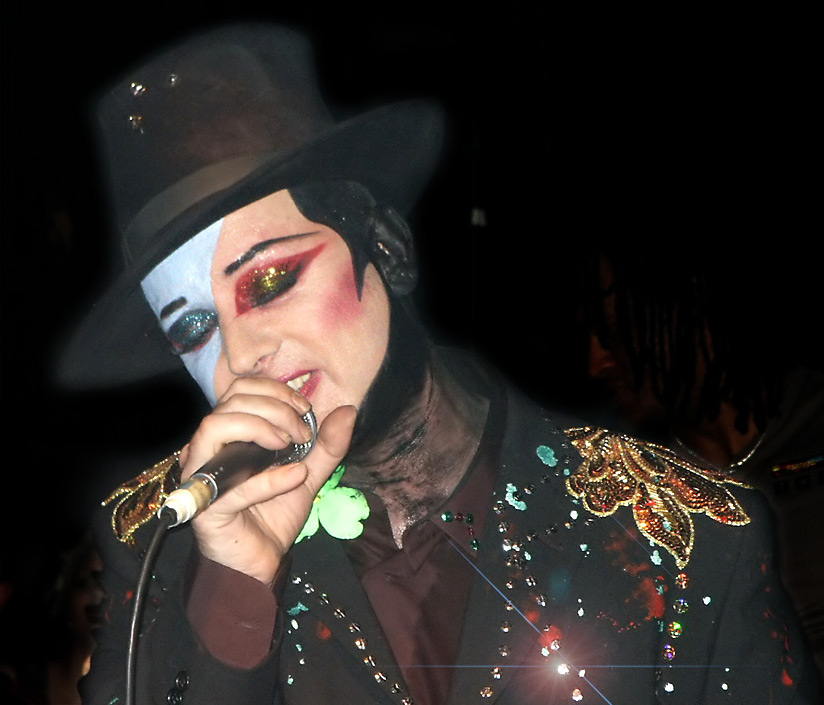
Boy George of Culture Club (performing in 2001) was a leading figure in the New Romantic movement which became a major part in the Second British Invasion of the U.S.

Early in 1983, radio consultant Lee Abrams advised his clients at 70 album-oriented rock stations to double the amount of new music they played. Abrams stated, "All my favorite bands are English ... It's a more artistic place. Experimentation thrives there. Everything over here is more like McDonald's." During 1983, 30% of US record sales were from British acts. On 16 July 1983, twenty of the top forty singles were British, surpassing the previous record of 14 set in 1965; this tally was equaled the weeks ending 31 May – 7 June 1986. Culture Club, Spandau Ballet, and Duran Duran created a teen "hysteria" similar to Beatlemania during the first British Invasion. Newsweek magazine ran an issue which featured Annie Lennox and Boy George on the cover of its issue with the caption "Britain Rocks America – Again", while Rolling Stone would release an "England Swings" issue in November 1983. The following April, 40 of the top 100 singles were by acts of British origin. In 1983, the Police's Synchronicity (1983) was number one on the Billboard 200 for 17 weeks, traded the top spot with Michael Jackson's Thriller (1982) three times, and their song "Every Breath You Take" was number one on the Billboard Hot 100 for 8 weeks and was the best-selling single in the US in 1983.

The American cable subscription channel MTV helped launch the second British Invasion by promoting music videos for groups including the Human League, Duran Duran, Tears for Fears, Culture Club, and Eurythmics.

U.S. radio stations that catered to black audiences also played Second Invasion acts. Music critic Nelson George ascribed this "reverse crossover" to the dancibility of the songs. Another music journalist, Simon Reynolds, theorized that, just as in the first British Invasion, the use of African-American influences by British acts such as Eurythmics, Spandau Ballet, Culture Club, Paul Young, and Wham! helped to spur their success. George Michael's band Wham! released the 1984 US chart-topper "Wake Me Up Before You Go-Go"; its music video featured oversized message T-shirts created by Katharine Hamnett, starting a craze covered in the 2002 VH1 series I Love the 80s. Released afterward in 1984, "Careless Whisper" by George Michael also scaled the Hot 100.

At the Second Invasion's height, during a five-month period, UK acts claimed nine out of the eleven Hot 100 number-one hits, from Simple Minds' "Don't You (Forget About Me)" through to Dire Straits' "Money for Nothing". During the second week of that period, the week ending 25 May 1985, eight of the top ten singles were by UK acts. Tears for Fears' "Shout" spent three weeks at number one. "Don't You (Forget About Me)", which features in The Breakfast Club (1985), rendered Simple Minds the first British act to achieve a Hot 100 hit with a single taken from a Brat Pack film soundtrack; subsequent artists included John Parr and the Psychedelic Furs, who recorded the title tracks of St. Elmo's Fire (1985) and Pretty in Pink (1986), respectively (the former reaching number one). Orchestral Manoeuvres in the Dark – who had been an early presence in the invasion – entered the top five with the "zeitgeist-capturing" hit single "If You Leave", which plays prominently during Pretty in Pink's climactic "prom scene".

During the Second British Invasion, established British acts such as Queen, David Bowie, Paul McCartney, Phil Collins, Rod Stewart, Elton John, and the Rolling Stones saw their popularity increase; a few acts that dated to the era of the original British Invasion, including George Harrison, the Kinks, the Hollies, the Moody Blues, and Eddy Grant, had their last major hits in this time frame. Counting his work with Genesis, Collins had more top forty hits on the Billboard Hot 100 chart during the 1980s than any other artist. British progressive rock artists would achieve major chart success in the US during the 1980s, such as Genesis with "Invisible Touch" reaching No. 1, Yes with "Owner of a Lonely Heart" achieving the same, and the Alan Parsons Project with "Sirius", which would be used as entrance music by various US sports teams, notably the Chicago Bulls.

== Reaction ==
A revolution in sound and style—lying somewhere between artful ingenuity and pure pop fun – has taken root in this country over the past year and a half. Much like the first great explosion of pop culture upon mass consciousness, which commenced with the Beatles' arrival in America in February 1964, the primary impetus for all this has been emanating from the far side of the Atlantic. We are, as X gripes so loudly, in the throes of the second British Invasion.

— "Anglomania: The Second British Invasion," by Parke Puterbaugh for Rolling Stone, November 1983.

The guys were so beautiful. Not handsome in the classic 'movie star' way, but actually pretty—lush lips, cheekbones a mile-high, porcelain skin—and they all knew how to apply make-up better than most women I knew.

— Nina Blackwood, MTV VJ

Explaining why another British Invasion was taking place, one record-industry insider stated, "For whatever psychological reason, there is a very vocal and influential Anglophile rock audience that salivates to hits from abroad." All of this activity and the unusually high turnover of artists in the charts caused a sense of upheaval in the US. Commentators in the mainstream media credited MTV and the British acts with bringing colour and energy back to pop music that had been missing since the 1960s, while rock journalists were generally hostile to the phenomenon because they felt it represented image over content and that the "English haircut bands" had not paid their dues. As the birthplace of glam rock the UK was always more theatrical than its US counterpart. Parke Puterbaugh for Rolling Stone writes, "The runaway success in early '82 of 'I Ran (So Far Away)' by A Flock of Seagulls was the icing on the cake. Fronted by a singer-synth player with a haircut stranger than anything you'd be likely to encounter in a month of poodle shows, A Flock of Seagulls struck gold on the first try. The message seemed abundantly clear: America was ready for anything—the stranger, the better. And Britain, home of the brave new world of pop, has kept lobbing them over."

With the emergence of MTV, Jerry Jaffe, head of A&R at Polygram, stated, "I think the kids who watched it felt that there was something more than what they were being spoon-fed on local radio stations. Radio stations, for the first time, were getting requests for songs they were not playing." Puterbaugh writes, "The British won out here, hands down. Next to the prosaic, foursquare appearance of the American bands, such acts as Duran Duran seemed like caviar. MTV opened up a whole new world that could not be fully apprehended over the radio. The visual angle played to the arty conceits of Britain's young style barons, suggesting something more exotic than the viewer was likely to find in the old hometown."

I hear the radio, it's finally gonna play new music you know the British invasion but what about the Minutemen, Flesh Eaters, D.O.A., Big Boys, and the Black Flag were the last American bands to get played on the radio please bring the Flag, please bring the Flag glitter disco synthesizer, night school all the noble savage drum drum drum

— American punk band X from their 1983 song "I Must Not Think Bad Thoughts".

The commercial burnout of corporate rock around 1979 opened the door for new music, most of which was from the UK. Giving a theory why this was the case, Polygram's Jaffe stated, "often bands you see in America are an amalgam of what they've heard on AOR radio. The motivation for American kids is, 'We want to be the next Van Halen and get rich'". Bob Currie, manager of A&R for EMI, added, "Bands in America want to be signed to make money, while bands in the UK want to be signed to communicate."

The UK initially embraced what was called "New Pop". However, by 1983, the song "Rip It Up" by Scottish rock band Orange Juice and "kill ugly pop stars" graffiti were expressions of both a backlash against the Second Invasion groups and nostalgia for punk. "Instant Club Hit (You'll Dance to Anything)", which became an underground hit for Philadelphia punk group the Dead Milkmen, took a satirical shot at the American subculture that followed British alternative/new wave.

According to music journalist Simon Reynolds, a majority of acts that signed to independent labels in 1984 mined various rock influences and became an alternative to the Second Invasion. Reynolds named the Smiths and R.E.M. as the two most important "alt rock acts" among this group noting that they "were eighties bands only in the sense of being against the eighties".

The Second British Invasion had its most direct impact on US country music, which immediately prior to the Invasion was enjoying a brief renaissance of mainstream popularity buoyed by country pop crossover artists. By 1984, country's mainstream popularity had fallen to a level not seen since disco, and Music Row publishers responded by retrenching, promoting neotraditional country artists popular with country's fan base but with less appeal outside it. Country's crossover appeal would not recover until 1991.

== End of the Invasion ==
As the 1980s wore on, US rock, heavy metal, and pop music acts learned how to market themselves using video and making catchy singles. Martin Fry of the Second British Invasion group ABC says that "The reality was that Madonna, Prince and Michael Jackson did it better, bigger and more global than a lot of British acts." From 1983 to 1985, several glam metal acts dented the US charts and received some airplay on MTV, but heavy metal was still seen as a genre limited in popularity to teenage boys. In the spring and summer of 1986, acts associated with the Second Invasion continued to have chart success, with eight records reaching the Hot 100's summit. That fall, Bon Jovi's third studio album Slippery When Wet topped the Billboard 200 and spent eight non-consecutive weeks there, and the leadoff single "You Give Love a Bad Name" displaced the Human League's "Human" atop the Hot 100. Such developments eventually led to decreased visibility of new music. 1987 saw only seven British acts on the Hot 100's top 40 in January, and new music exposure on MTV was limited to the program The New Video Hour. In 1988, British acts rebounded with twelve singles topping the chart that year.

As late as the mid-1990s, the Spice Girls were identified as part of the Second British Invasion; and prominent British acts such as Oasis, Blur, Take That, and the Verve (some of whom were associated with the Britpop movement in their native United Kingdom) had some limited success in the U.S., albeit less than their 1980s predecessors. US hits from these bands included "Wannabe" (Spice Girls), "Wonderwall" (Oasis), "Song 2" (Blur), "Back for Good" (Take That), and "Bitter Sweet Symphony" (the Verve). Over time British acts became less prevalent on the US charts, and on 27 April 2002, for the first time in almost forty years, the Hot 100 had no British acts at all; that week, only two of the top 100 albums, those of Craig David and Ozzy Osbourne, were from British artists.

== See also ==
- New wave of British heavy metal
- List of Second British Invasion artists
- British Invasion, 1960s
- Third British Invasion, 2000s–2010s
- Fourth British Invasion, 2020s
- New Romantic
- Synth-pop
- The Eighties, CNN series with episode seven featuring the Second British Invasion

== Bibliography ==
- Cateforis, Theo Are We Not New Wave Modern Pop at the Turn of the 1980s, The University of Michigan Press 2011 ISBN 978-0-472-03470-3
