= Living Your Life =

Studio album by Belouis Some
- Released: October 1993
- Genre: Pop; dance; house
- Length: 46:35
- Label: Ariola; BMG
- Producer: Geoff Dugmore; Nigel Butler; Robin Goodfellow

Belouis Some chronology
Belouis Some (1987)	Living Your Life (1993)

Living Your Life is the third studio album by British singer and songwriter Belouis Some, released in Germany in October 1993.

== Background ==
Living Your Life was Belouis Some's first studio album in six years and is his last to date. After forming the band The Big Broadcast and touring the UK, playing small venues and clubs, Some returned to his next solo project, the recording of Living Your Life. It was recorded at Marcus Recording Studios in London between February and April 1993. It was primarily produced by Geoff Dugmore and Nigel Butler, with two tracks ("Sometimes" and "Total Control") produced by Robin Goodfellow. Some musicians contributing to the album included Karl Hyde, Steve Barnacle, Peter Oxendale, and J.J. Belle.

The album's lead single, "Something She Said", was released in the UK and Europe in August 1993 and failed to reach the top 100 of the UK singles chart. A second single, "Sometimes", was also a commercial failure. Living Your Life was originally scheduled for release in the UK on 13 September 1993, but the album was subsequently shelved and only given a release in Germany in October 1993.

Some later attributed the album's commercial failure, and that of its two singles, to Arista Records' and BMG's lack of interest in promoting it. In a 2024 interview with Spill Magazine, he recalled, "It was an album that was hard to make. I had to fight to have [it] made. Bit by bit it came together. I really like that album [and] thought there were some great songs on it. [It] just got lost [when it was released]."

Belouis Some would not release any new material after the album, except for the 1995 single "Let Me Love You for Tonight", released in the UK only.

== Critical reception ==
Professional ratings
Review scores
Source	Rating
AllMusic	3/5 stars

Upon its release, pan-European magazine Music & Media wrote, "This British new rock artist returns to the scene with possibly his strongest effort to date. Strong melodies abound, as well as imaginative and energetic arrangements." In 1994, Larry Flick of Billboard magazine noted that the single "Sometimes", a "dark and jangly mover", is "an enticing peek into Living Your Life, an album that gingerly walks the line between hardcore dance and smooth urban pop". He continued, "Among the standouts are the languid 'Birthday in Paradise' and the stomping 'New World'. Open your mind and give a listen." John Bush of AllMusic noted that Some "blends contemporary pop with harder-edged techno over the course of the album".

== Track listing ==
No.	Title	Writer(s)	Length
1.	"Something She Said"	Belouis Some	4:23
2.	"Sometimes"	Belouis Some, Peter Oxendale	5:00
3.	"Living Your Life"	Belouis Some	6:36
4.	"Summer Rain"	Belouis Some	4:18
5.	"Wonderful Life"	Belouis Some, Geoff Dugmore, Nigel Butler	5:11
6.	"Birthday in Paradise"	Belouis Some	6:25
7.	"New World"	Belouis Some	3:48
8.	"Little China"	Belouis Some	4:40
9.	"Total Control"	Jeff Jourard, Martha Davis	6:09

== Personnel ==
- Belouis Some – lead vocals
- Geoff Dugmore – producer, mixing, arranger, backing vocals, drums and programming (tracks 1, 3 to 8), additional producer (track 2)
- Nigel Butler – producer, mixing, arranger, backing vocals and programming (tracks 1, 3 to 8), additional producer (track 2), keyboards (tracks 2, 9)
- Robin Goodfellow – producer (tracks 2, 9), keyboards (tracks 2, 9)
- Tim Russell – engineer (tracks 1, 3 to 8), mixing
- Tim Hunt – engineer (tracks 2, 9)
- Trippy Guru Mamas – backing vocals (tracks 1, 3 to 8)
- Candy McKenzie – backing vocals (tracks 2, 9)
- Patti Layne – backing vocals (tracks 2, 9)
- Karl Hyde – guitar (tracks 1, 3 to 8)
- J.J. Belle – guitars (tracks 2, 9)
- Phil Bishop – guitars (tracks 2, 9)
- Steve Barnacle – bass (tracks 1, 3 to 8)
- Jeremy Allom – keyboards (tracks 2, 9), programming (tracks 2, 9)
- Toby Anderson – keyboards (tracks 2, 9), programming (tracks 2, 9)
- Chris Quayle – sleeve design
- Kate Martin – photography
