= Animal Magic (song) =

Single by Belouis Some

from the album Belouis Some
- Released: September 1987
- Genre: New wave
- Length: 4:33
- Label: Parlophone, Capitol
- Songwriters: Belouis Some, Guy Fletcher
- Producers: Gary Langan, Guy Fletcher

Belouis Some singles chronology
"Let It Be with You" (1987)	"Animal Magic" (1987)	"Some Girls" (1988)

"Animal Magic" is a song by English new wave musician Belouis Some, from his 1987 self-titled second album. Released as the second single from the album, the song reached No. 6 on the U.S. Hot Dance Club Play chart. A popular club remix appeared on the U.S. 12" release on Capitol Records, with remix and additional production by Justin Strauss and Murray Elias.

On the CD compilation Retro:Active7 - Rare & Remixed (2010), Strauss and Elias mention in the liner notes how they thought the vocal delivery of "Animal Magic" was kind of New Order-ish and that "Bizarre Love Triangle" was dominating the clubs at the time, so they tried to bring that sound to the remix.

== Music video ==
The song's accompanying music video was directed by Michael Utterback and was produced by Jane Reardon for Libman Moore Productions. It was shot in Los Angeles. Speaking to Jackie in 1987, Belouis Some said about the video, "I really enjoyed making the video. It was great fun [and] the crew were fantastic. It's a very cool and sophisticated video and although some people might say it's a mite pretentious, it's not. It's slightly erotic and sensual but there's no way it's going to be banned."

== Critical reception ==
Upon its release, Roger Morton of Record Mirror described "Animal Magic" as a "pert little slice of softly-softly pop, with some winning birdy noises which totally fail to disguise Mr Some's painfully mannered vocal delivery". Jerry Smith of Music Week called the song a "smooth, polished ballad" and hoped that it would "be the one to break Belouis Some over here, at last." Norman Corbett of Aberdeen Press and Journal gave the single three out of four stars and commented, "Laid-back cut not sharp enough to pierce big time success. Pleasing enough sound from Some flows along but lacks bite. Profligate use of vocal talent."

In the US, Billboard considered the song to be a "melodious and lucid pop number" with "nice production". In a review of Belouis Some, Scott Benarde of The Palm Beach Post described the song as "dreamy".

== Track listing ==
UK 12"
A. "Animal Magic" (Extended Version)
B1. "Animal Magic" (Radio Version)
B2. "Aware of You"

U.S. 12"
A1. "Animal Magic" (Dance Vocal) (Remix, additional production: Justin Strauss & Murray Elias) - 6:58
A2. "Animal Magic" (Jungle Mix) (Remix, additional production: Justin Strauss & Murray Elias) - 7:10
B1. "Animal Magic" (Dub) (Remix, additional production: Justin Strauss & Murray Elias) - 6:10
B2. "Aware of You" (Producer: Steve Thompson & Michael Barbiero) - 3:42

== Charts ==
Chart (1987)	Peak position
Italy Airplay (Music & Media)	20
US Dance/Club Play Songs (Billboard)	6
