= Amazonica =

British rock singer and DJ (born 1982)

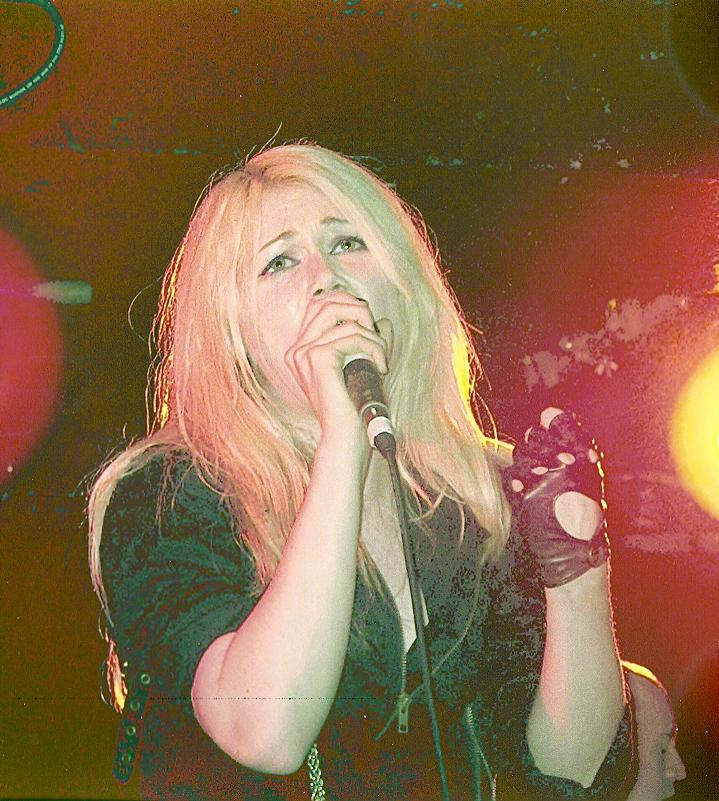

Background information
- Also known as: Harry, Dirty Harry
- Born: Victoria Harrison; 10 May 1982 (age 44); London, England
- Genres: Alternative rock, pop rock
- Occupations: Singer, songwriter, DJ
- Website: Twitter

Victoria Harrison (born 10 May 1982) is a British rock singer and DJ who performs under the stage name Amazonica (and formerly Harry and Dirty Harry).

== Biography ==
=== Early life ===
Harry spent her early life living in Singapore and New York City as well as in the United Kingdom, and was raised under strict conservative family values – a vicar grandfather and mother in charge of a local Sunday school.

Harry connected with singers such as Patti Smith and Janis Joplin – influences in both her youth and musical stylings.

As she grew up, Harry became involved in the London music and social scene. She first experienced the London nightlife in her teens – earning her ‘Dirty’ tag along the way, and building a reputation for herself on the underground music scene before launching a music career of her own.

=== The Trouble with... Harry ===
Originally recording as "Dirty Harry", Harry recorded two singles (the limited release industrial pop track "Eye", and "Nothing Really Matters") on her own record label, Dirty World Records, as well as an early version of her debut album, The Trouble with... Harry. However, the album's release was not an easy process and complications ensued, resulting in a legal battle leading to Harry dropping her 'Dirty' tag and rebranding herself simply as Harry.

The album was re-recorded and edited under this new name. Years after its inception, it was released in April 2003, through Telstar Records along with the album's supporting singles – "So Real", "Imagination" and "Follow Me". In 2003, Rimmel used "Imagination" – Harry's cover of Belouis Some's hit – to front a TV advertising campaign. The song was also the lead track on Harry's Under the Covers EP which also featured the video for the song.

=== Collaborations ===
- In 2004, Harry performed a duet on "Take" from Raymond Watts' album, Pigmartyr.
- In 2005, Harry appeared as a guest vocalist on "Making Me Crazy" for Tommy Lee's solo album, Tommyland.
- Two tracks were recorded ("Set Fire to Me" and "Never Stop") with Crystal Method for DJ Hyper's album, We Control.
- In the same year, she sang alongside Dani Filth in Cradle of Filth's recording of "Temptation" (a cover of Heaven 17) for the album Thornography. She was also in the video for the song alongside the band.

=== Press coverage ===
In November 2006, Mick Rock photographed Harry for her own article in Playboy. In July 2008, Harry was interviewed alongside Courtney Love for Nylon magazine.

=== Television appearances ===
In 2003, she appeared in an episode of the UK Channel 4 television programme, Faking it, where she was to help transform a choir girl into a "rock chick". Controversy arose when the participant, Laura-Jane Foley, claimed she had been misrepresented by the show. However, the episode in question had already run into trouble before it aired, with regular sponsors Smirnoff refusing to be associated with its scenes of "irresponsible drinking", in which Harry appeared hungover after a night out.

Her filmwork also includes a role as Sophie Johnstone in the 1992 TV series Homeward Bound, and a small role as a lady of the night, Maria, alongside Jonny Lee Miller in the 1999 British film, Plunkett & Macleane.

In May 2003 Harry appeared on the BBC's Re:covered programme, where she performed both "Imagination", and a cover of Blondie's hit "One Way or Another".

In late 2006, Harry was chosen as the face and voice of buy.com's $30 million national US marketing campaign, recording a song for, and appearing in the television advertisement for the company.

== Discography ==
=== Albums ===
- The Trouble with... Harry (2003) (released under the name Harry)
- Songs from the Edge (2007)
- (un)Released (2009) – A compilation album of various rare tracks from Harry's career.

=== EPs ===
- Under the Covers (2003) (released under the name Harry) – UK No. 43
- God Shaped Hole (2009)

=== Singles ===
- "Eye" (2000)
- "Nothing Really Matters" (2001)
- "So Real" (2002) (released under the name Harry) – UK No. 53
- "Follow Me" (2003) (released under the name Harry)
- "High on You" (2015) (released under the name Amazonica)
- "(Don't Fear) The Reaper" (2018) (released under the name Amazonica)
