= Combo Audio =

American new wave group

Combo Audio was a new wave group from Champaign-Urbana, Illinois, best known for their song "Romanticide."

== History ==
Combo Audio was formed as a vehicle for songs written by John Kellogg and collaborator Rick Neuhaus that evolved into a band. Several of their songs began to be played on local radio stations before their first gig. The group signed with local indie start up label Secret Records formed as a vehicle for Combo Audio music. Produced by Dana Walden and the group, "Romanticide" was produced and released as a single b/w "It's a Crime". "Romanticide" received "Top Single Pick" in Billboard as a result and received further airplay on college radio and major stations in Chicago, New York and Los Angeles. Following creative differences original bassist Tom Broske was replaced by Angus Thomas. Ken Adamany who managed Cheap Trick showed interest and engaged to manage the group. The group signed with EMI America and produced an EP Combo Audio that was released in late 1983. Dana Walden began production of the EP with engineer Ian Taylor engineering and mixing with Paul Klingberg as second engineer. Eventually Walden was dropped from the project and the band and Ian Taylor finished the record at The Cars' Syncro Sound studios in Boston with Taylor producing and engineering. Several years of nearly non-stop touring in mostly the Midwest followed. The group played clubs and universities and other large venues. They co-billed with or shared stages with Talking Heads, U2, Billy Idol, Duran Duran, The Tubes, JoBoxers, Berlin, Missing Persons, Stray Cats and INXS.

Starting in 1984, fissures began to appear. There was a disagreement between Secret Records and EMI over ownership of the group. Kellogg signed a publishing deal with Warner Chappell Music which led to more disagreements and disputes with Walden. In the middle of this to the dismay of the group EMI began to push the band to produce a more "commercial" pop sound. Legal complaints and threats of litigation appeared. While awaiting resolution of the disputes EMI cut support to the band. In 1985, after a company shakeup, EMI fired the group. In 1986, Kellogg and Thomas revamped a new version of the group with drummer David Suycott and other additional players. The group performed live in 1986 and 1987 with these additional players. Kellogg and Thomas continued to write and record independently with engineer, producer Paul Klingberg.

== "Romanticide" ==
"Romanticide" was released as a single for Secret Records in 1982 and as part of the Combo Audio EP. Two videos for the song were made. The first, made for the original 1982 single version, was only shown on the RockAmerica cable music subscription service. The second, made for the EP version, went into "power rotation" on MTV in early 1983 following its release. The song was the "top single" in Billboard and regular support and airplay followed in New York City, Boston, Chicago, St. Louis and Los Angeles. The song became available on the first volume of the compilation series, Living in Oblivion: The 80's Greatest Hits in 1993. NME describes the song as a "new wave classic".

== Post-Combo Audio years ==
John Kellogg has done extensive work with surround sound. He helped produce the first 5.1 music mixes for the introduction of Dolby Digital on Laserdisc. He has produced 5.1. surround sound albums for several Classic rock groups. The 5.1 DVD Audio release of 4 for Foreigner became one of the best selling DVD Audio surround music releases of all time. He also did consulting work for Britney Spears Live in Las Vegas. In 2005, Kellogg founded the Jhana Music Group music label which was scheduled to launch in 2008. He worked with Rocky Maffitt on his album scheduled for 2008 release. Maffitt while better known as a member of the soft rock outfit Champaign was briefly a member of the revived Combo Audio. Kellogg currently lives in Hollywood, California, with his longtime partner and significant other. He has one adult daughter, a musician and artist in Venice, California.

Angus Thomas has toured with Miles Davis, John Mayall. In 1999, he moved to Los Angeles to work with Paul Klingberg at Ignited Productions and studios. He became a part of the European Jazz Circuit during the 1990s. In the late 1990s, he released a CD entitled The Overdog. In the early 2000s, he worked for and played on the soundtrack for The King of Queens and well as other shows and commercials. He continues work and play in a Los Angeles studio as well as continuing to work and perform in Europe. He has residences in Los Angeles and Amsterdam.

Rick Neuhaus became a finishing painter and artist in Chicago where his work is still seen in many parts of that city. Hearing a djembe at a West African drumming performance inspired a third career. He is a member of the African drumming ensemble Dahui in Chicago and has led and played in drumming circles as well as leading workshops. He lives in Chicago with his significant other. His son has had success in competitive skateboarding. Rick has become a significant force in djembe drumming and world music in Chicago.

== Members ==
Current

- John Kellogg – vocal guitars keyboards effects percussion
- Rick Neuhaus – drums percussion electronic percussion programming
- Angus Thomas – backing vocal basses bass pedals effects

Previous

- Tom Broeske – bass, backing vocals
- Rocky Maffit – percussion, backing vocals
