= List of Second British Invasion artists =

The following is a list of groups and artists associated with the Second British Invasion music phenomenon, that occurred during the early and mid-1980s and was associated with MTV, including new wave music.

Contents
Top A B C D E F G H I J K L M N O P Q R S T U V W X Y Z

== A ==
- ABC
- Adam and the Ants
- After the Fire
- The Alarm
- Art of Noise

== B ==
- Bananarama
- Belouis Some
- Big Country
- David Bowie (career resurgence)
- Bow Wow Wow
- The Buggles

== C ==
- Phil Collins (career resurgence)
- Elvis Costello
- Culture Club
- The Cure
- Cutting Crew

== D ==
- Dead or Alive
- Def Leppard
- Depeche Mode
- Dexys Midnight Runners
- Dire Straits
- Thomas Dolby
- Duran Duran

== E ==
- The English Beat
- Eurythmics

== F ==
- Fastway
- A Flock of Seagulls
- The Fixx
- Frankie Goes to Hollywood

== G ==
- Genesis (career resurgence)
- Eddy Grant

== H ==
- Haircut One Hundred
- Heaven 17
- The Human League

== I ==
- Billy Idol
- Iron Maiden

== J ==
- Joe Jackson
- Elton John (career resurgence)
- Howard Jones
- Joy Division
- Judas Priest

== K ==
- Kajagoogoo
- Nik Kershaw

== L ==
- Nick Lowe

== M ==
- Madness
- Paul McCartney (career resurgence)
- Modern English
- Alison Moyet

== N ==
- Naked Eyes
- New Order
- Gary Numan

== O ==
- Orchestral Manoeuvres in the Dark

== P ==
- John Parr
- Pet Shop Boys
- The Police
- The Pretenders

== S ==
- Simple Minds
- Soft Cell
- Spandau Ballet
- The Specials
- Squeeze
- Rod Stewart (career resurgence)
- The Style Council

== T ==
- Talk Talk
- Tears for Fears
- Thompson Twins
- T'Pau

== U ==
- Ultravox

== V ==
- Visage

== W ==
- Wang Chung
- Wham!

== Y ==
- Yes (career resurgence)
- Paul Young

== See also ==
- Second British Invasion
- List of British Invasion artists
