= Target Practice (song) =

Single by Belouis Some

from the album Some People
- Released: 21 May 1984 (1st version)
- Genre: New wave, synth-pop
- Length: 4:16
- Label: EMI, Parlophone
- Songwriter(s): Belouis Some
- Producer(s): Ian Little; Peter Schwier; Steve Thompson; Michael Barbiero

Belouis Some singles chronology
"Lose It to You" (1981)	"Target Practice" (1984)	"Imagination" (1985)

"Target Practice" is a song by British musician Belouis Some, released on 21 May 1984 as his first major label single after his 1981 debut "Lose It to You". The song was written by Some, and produced by Peter Schwier and Ian Little.

"Target Practice" was re-recorded in New York in early 1985, with Steve Thompson and Michael Barbiero as the producers. This new version was included on Some's 1985 debut album Some People. It was also released as a single in 1986 and reached No. 16 on South Africa Springbok Chart in 1986, which was his third consecutive top 20 hit there. A music video for the 1986 release was directed by Brian Travers and produced by Annie Croft for PMI.

== Background ==
In a 1984 interview with Sunday Sun, Some stated, "Unfortunately, people may get the wrong idea about me from the single. It does sound like Bowie, but it is the only track on my forthcoming LP which does. I've been trying my hardest not to sound like Bowie, even though I'm a great fan of both him and Roxy Music."

== Critical reception ==
Upon its release, Paul Benbow of Reading Evening Post said of the 1984 version, "The voice sounds not unlike David Bowie at first but there the similarity ends. Straight pop song with a catchy hook line but no classic." Linda Duff of Smash Hits noted the "strange, rather wordy lyric" and "clever take-off of Mr Bowie's singing style", but felt the song was otherwise "completely unremarkable". Hugh Fielder of Sounds coommented, "Promising idea that gets lost because the singer can't stop sounding like Bowie and the chorus is so weak they have to resort to heavy phasing to pull it through".

In a review of Some People, Voice of Youth Advocates described the re-recorded track as "electro power pop a la Power Station" and one that "sounds like a hit." Billboard considered the song to be one of the album's best tracks and noted it being "rockier" than the title track.

== Track listing ==
=== 1984 release ===
7–inch single

1. "Target Practice" – 4:04
2. "Some People" – 4:15

12–inch single

1. "Target Practice" (Extended) – 7:22
2. "Some People" – 4:15
3. "Target Practice" (Revisited) – 7:40

== Charts ==
Chart (1984)	Peak position
UK Singles Chart	189
