= RockAmerica =

Music video subscription service

RockAmerica is a music video subscription service for professional disc jockeys based in New York City, New York. Founded in 1980 by Ed Steinberg, it was the first company to offer music videos on a subscription basis, and provided a vital channel before the establishment of MTV and other television outlets.

Founded on the heels of successful record pools that would distribute disco and new wave records to DJs, the company applied the same principle to music video but with important differences. The videos, which were obtained from record labels both major and independent, were gathered into compilations. Clubs could subscribe and receive fresh tapes on a monthly basis. However the tapes had to be returned at the end of two months. Further conditions were dictated by copyright concerns. Clubs were not supposed to play the reels continuously but to mix them into other programming. The clubs were also mandated to provide monthly 'response forms' to RockAmerica from which the company produced a video chart, as well as more detailed analysis that could be purchased by marketers. The first program included videos by artists Madness, XTC, David Bowie, The Flying Lizards, The Ramones and Ian Dury. The company rapidly signed up a number of east coast clubs. The company also produced videos for a number of NYC artists including the Bush Tetras and, notably, the video for Madonna's debut single Everybody. By the summer of 1983 RockAmerica had 300 subscribers.

In its early days Bob Pittman of MTV based his programming on RockAmerica's chart.

The company remained influential in the 1990s playing a crucial role in breaking the boy band phenomenon.

In 2005 RockAmerica was acquired by the Retail Entertainment Design company. In 2007 Steinberg was made a Vice President of RockAmerica’s owner.
