= Belouis Some =

British singer, songwriter and musician (born 1959)

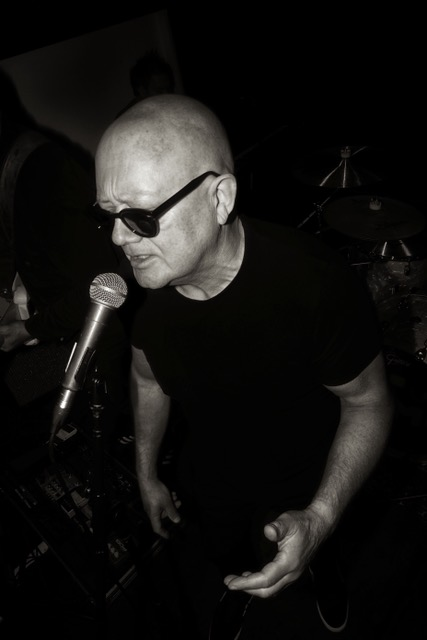
- Some at the Notting Hill Arts Club, 2025

Background information
- Born: Neville Keighley; 12 December 1959 (age 66); England
- Origin: Forest Hill, London
- Genres: New wave; synth-pop; sophisti-pop
- Years active: 1981–present
- Labels: Parlophone; Capitol; BMG
- Website: belouissome.com

Belouis Some (pronounced BLOO-ee SUM; born Neville Keighley; 12 December 1959) is a British singer, songwriter and musician. He had UK and worldwide hits in the 1980s with "Some People", "Imagination" and "Round, Round", the latter being featured on the soundtrack for the John Hughes film Pretty in Pink.

== Early life ==
Neville Keighley grew up in Forest Hill, south London. He started playing guitar and writing songs while at school (Dulwich Prep London and Royal Russell School). After leaving school in 1978, Keighley spent several years developing his songwriting, recording demos and playing London pubs and clubs.

== Career ==
Keighley's first release was "Lose It to You" on The Cue Record Label in 1981 under the name Nevil Rowe. This record was produced at Crescent Studios, Bath, by David Lord and Darren Hatch, later of the Italo disco group My Mine. Roland Orzabal and Curt Smith from the band Graduate, later Tears for Fears, played on the recording with Manny Elias on drums.

In 1982, Keighley formed his first band and started performing live gigs in and around London under the new name Belouis Some. He chose the name Belouis Some because he thought his given name was "very un-rock and roll" and he wanted a name that was ambiguous, given that he was a solo artist at a time when being a solo artist wasn't fashionable, and was performing live with a band at the time. He came up with "the Belouis something band", inspired by the song "Louie Louie" (popular at the time due to the film The Blues Brothers), but with the pressure of promoting scheduled gigs he ran out of time to find a second name to replace "something" so settled on Some. The lineup included guitarist Scott Taylor who later became a founding member of Then Jerico and on keyboards Phil Harrison from the Korgis. Belouis Some played numerous gigs the following year with his band developing his songs and musical style and after a gig at The Embassy Club, Old Bond Street in the summer of 1983, Belouis Some signed to Tritec Music owned by Paul and Michael Berrow, who at the time managed Duran Duran.

In October 1983, Some was signed to Parlophone by EMI's David Ambrose. The single "Target Practice" was released in spring 1984, his first single on a major label. To promote the release, Some supported Nik Kershaw on Kershaw's Human Racing UK tour in 1984.

In 1985, a new version of "Target Practice" was recorded and produced by Steve Thompson and Michael Barbiero; this new track was included on Some's first album and also later released as a single.

=== Some People ===
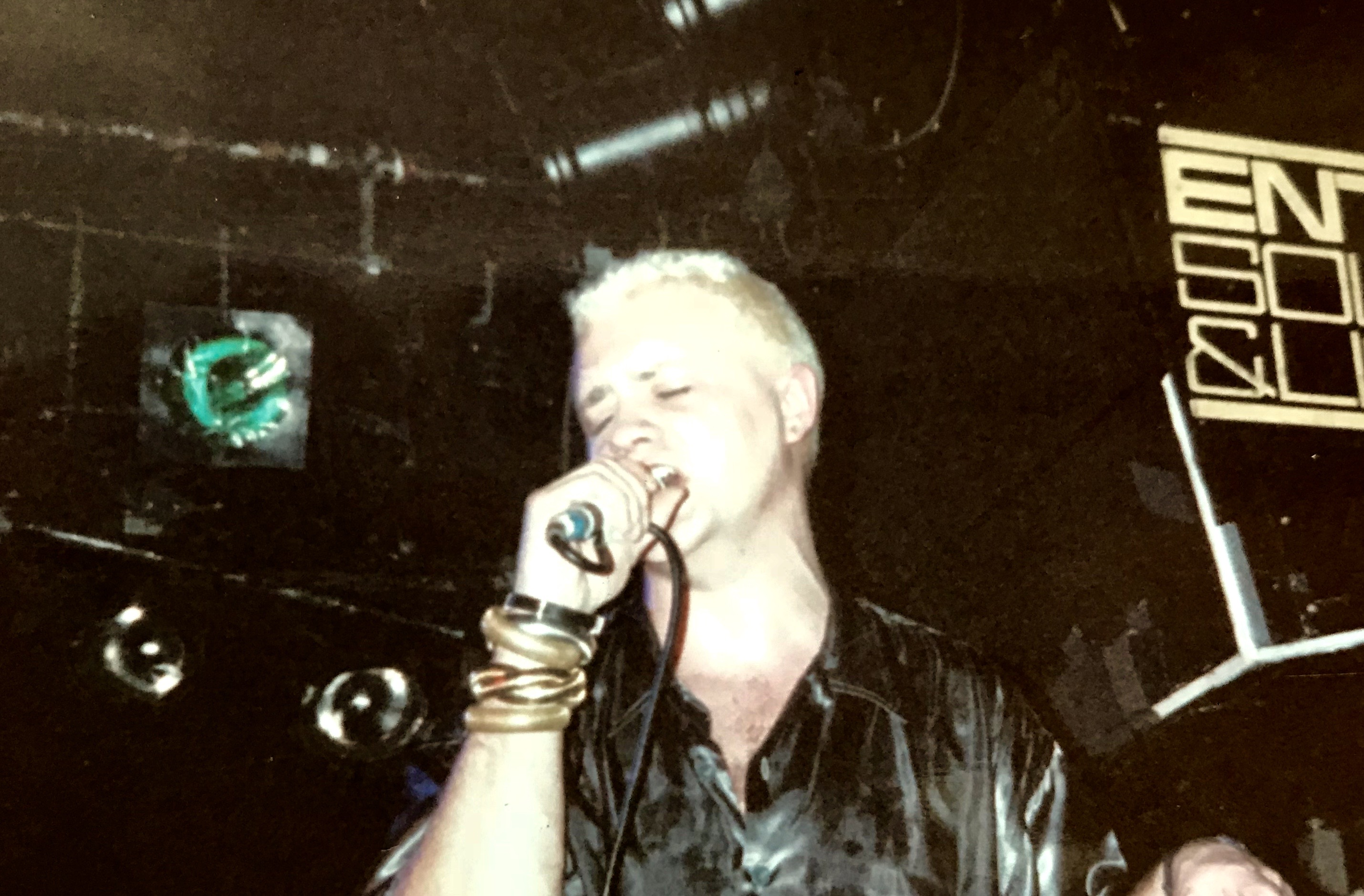
Belouis Some, Marquee Club 1985

Belouis Some's first album Some People was released in 1985.

Initial production had taken place on some tracks in London at Maison Rouge, Good Earth and AIR Studios produced by Ian Little and Pete Schwier with musicians Guy Fletcher, Chester Kamen, Andy Duncan, Gary Twigg, and Gary Barnacle.

Some People was produced by Steve Thompson and Michael Barbiero in New York City in late 1984 to early 1985, recorded at Mediasound. Belouis Some had been introduced to Thompson and Barbiero in New York in spring 1984, when they had been asked to do a dance mix of the original version of "Target Practice"; at this stage Some was not satisfied with the London recording sessions and asked if they would produce and re-record the tracks "Imagination" and "Walk Away". Some was introduced to guitarist and arranger Carlos Alomar who asked Bernard Edwards and Tony Thompson from Chic to play. Thompson and Barbiero were then asked to re-record "Target Practice" and "Aware of You", with overdubs and remixes of "Some People", "Jerusalem" and "Stand Down". Carmine Rojas, Alan Childs, Dave Lebolt and Kurt Yahjian were added to the recording line up with Earl Slick playing lead guitar on "Target Practice". During these sessions Danny Socolof became Some's manager, later joined by Bill Curbishley and Jackie Curbishley's Trinifold Management.

The video for the first single release from the album, "Imagination", was directed by Storm Thorgerson and caused controversy as it contained full frontal nudity. Using the 12" version, it was a success in bars and clubs, and the worldwide premier of the "Imagination" video was held at Studio 54. An alternative version without the nudity used the 7" edit of the track, suitable for MTV and mainstream TV. The video for the second single, "Some People", also directed by Thorgerson, was used as a Swatch television advertisement in the US.

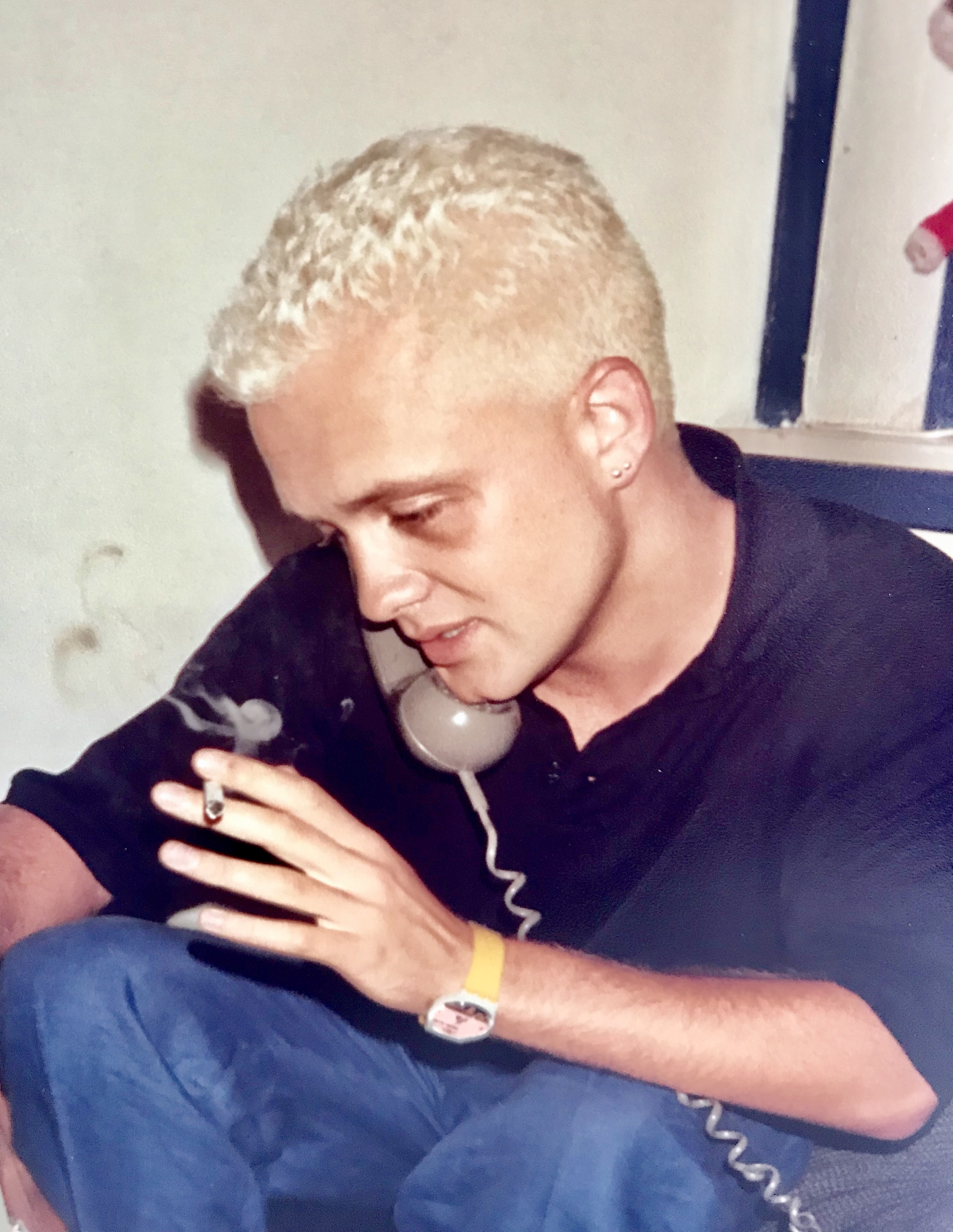
Belouis Some, London 1985

"Some People" and "Imagination" were both US Hot Dance Club Play hits.

In spring 1985, Belouis Some supported Frankie Goes to Hollywood on their North American tour with band members Chester Kamen, Gary Twigg, Larry Tolfree, Bias Boshell, Robin Clark and Sandy Bar. Some was sponsored by Swatch on the tour.

Some's contribution to the Pretty in Pink soundtrack, "Round, Round" (released February 1986) was written especially for the film and was produced by Bernard Edwards and recorded in Los Angeles in August 1985. The album was listed in Rolling Stone's list of "The 25 Greatest Soundtracks of All Time".

"Round, Round" propelled Belouis Some towards audiences outside of the clubs and college radio in the US and so, after worldwide chart success and extensive touring, the single "Imagination" was re-issued in the UK and became a hit in the United Kingdom in the spring of 1986. Both "Some People" and "Imagination" were remixed and re-issued several times.

"Imagination" can be heard in the films Ghost Chase (Hollywood-Monster) and The Business and has been used in various TV adverts including Panasonic, Barclays Bank and Rimmel London.

In May 1986, whilst on tour in the UK, Belouis Some also performed at Swatch Live at the Beacon Theatre, New York. Swatch Live also featured skateboarder Rodney Mullen.

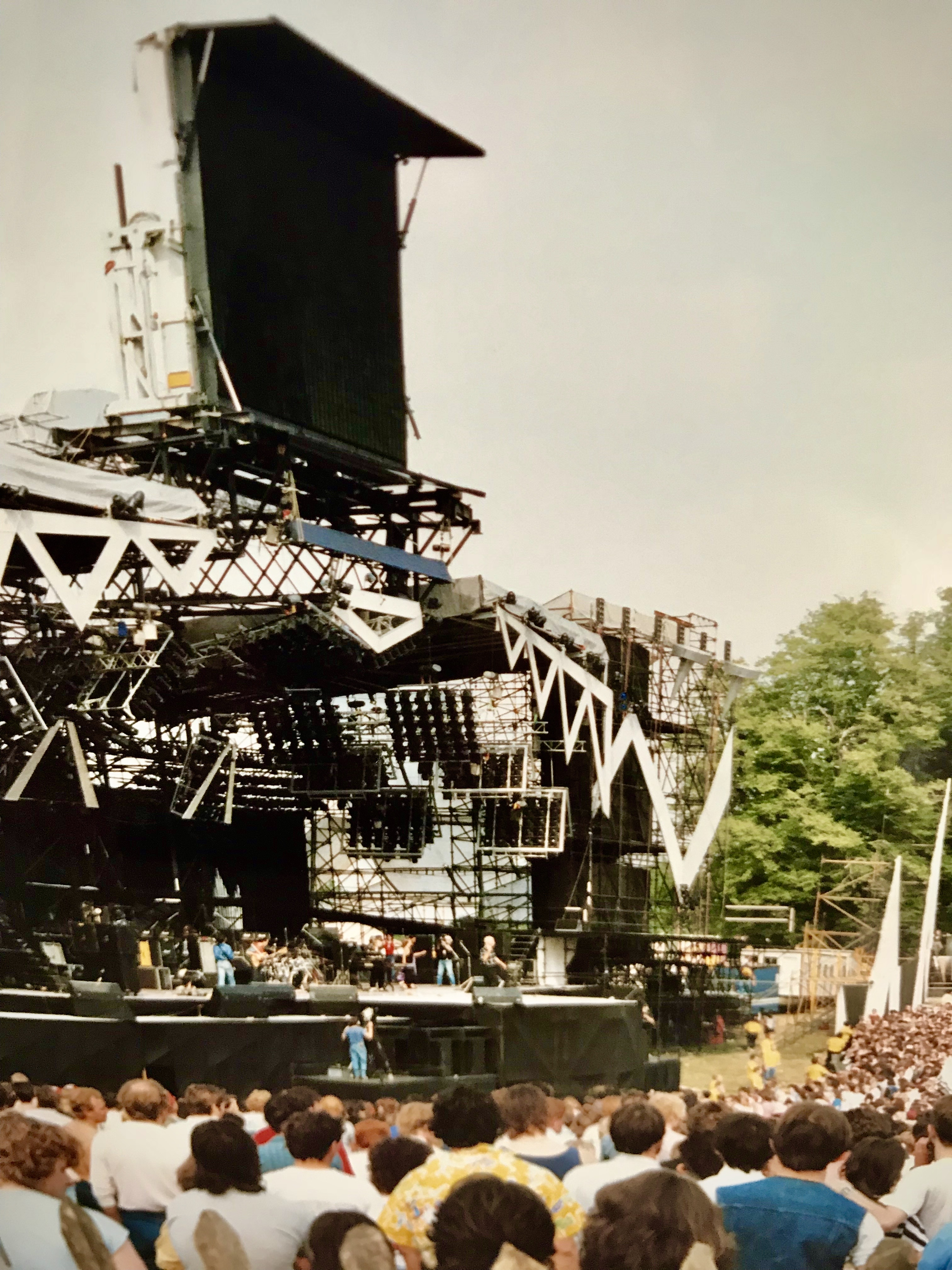
Belouis Some, Queen's Magic Tour, Knebworth August 1986

In the summer of 1986, Belouis Some was one of the support acts on Queen's Magic Tour appearing at Knebworth, Paris and Manchester.

=== Belouis Some ===
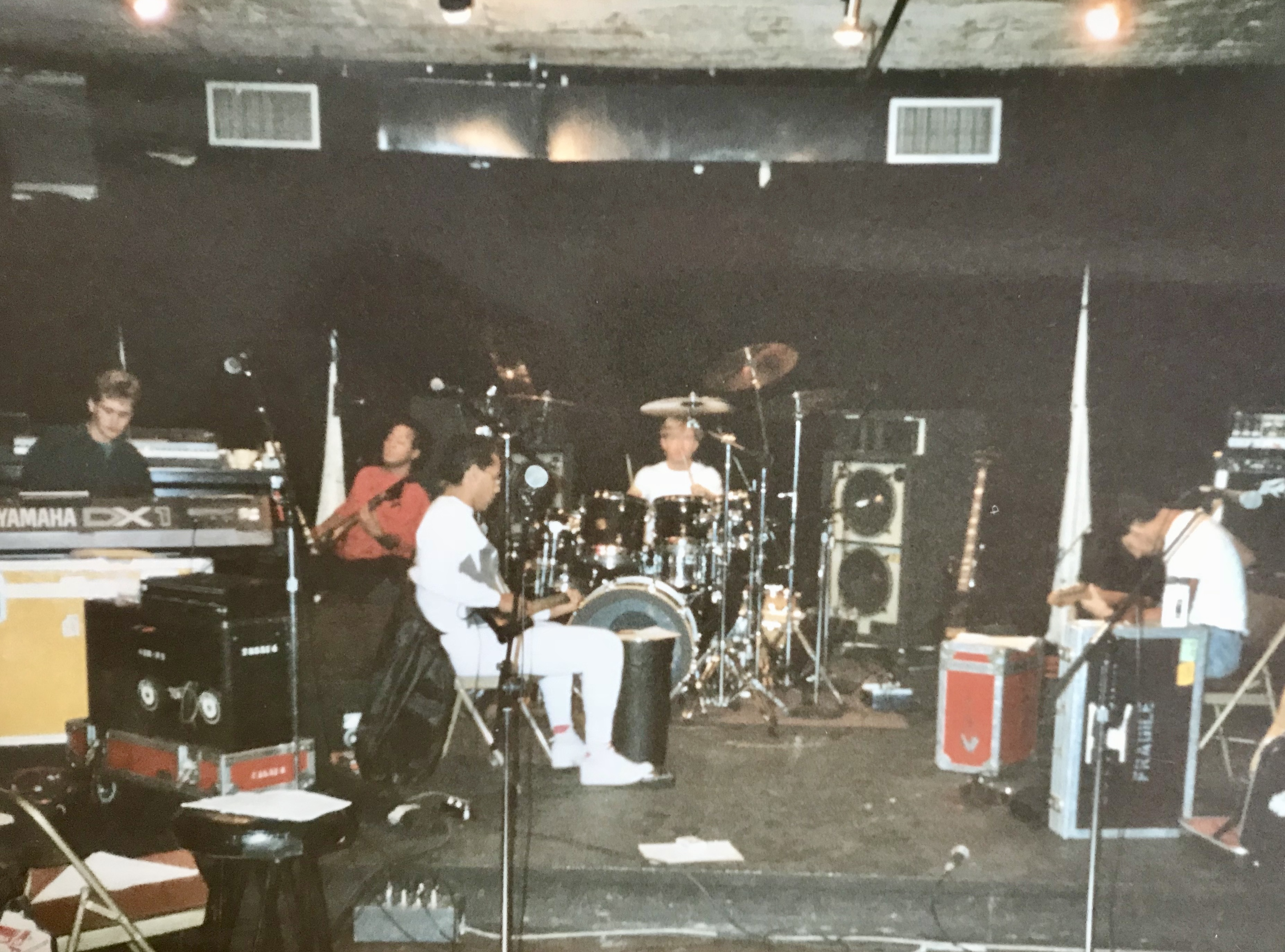
Guy Fletcher, Carmine Rojas, Carlos Alomar, Geoff Dugmore, Chester Kamen. Belouis Some sessions, Right Track Recording Studio, New York 1986

In late 1986, Belouis Some recorded his self-titled second album Belouis Some at Right Track and The Hit Factory in New York, produced by Gary Langan and Guy Fletcher. Some insisted that recording took place in New York with particular players as a live band. Carlos Alomar arranged the tracks again with Fletcher, he was joined on guitar by Chester Kamen, Carmine Rojas on bass, Geoff Dugmore played drums, Robin Clark and Gordon Grody sang backing vocals with Jimmy Maelen on percussion. The Bormeo Horns - Lenny Picket, Steve Elson and Stan Harrison played brass. Pete Townshend, Julian Lennon and Neal X made guest appearances on the album. The album was mixed in London at Eel Pie Recording Studios and Roundhouse Recording Studios.

"Let It Be with You" and "Animal Magic" were both US Hot Dance Club Play hits.

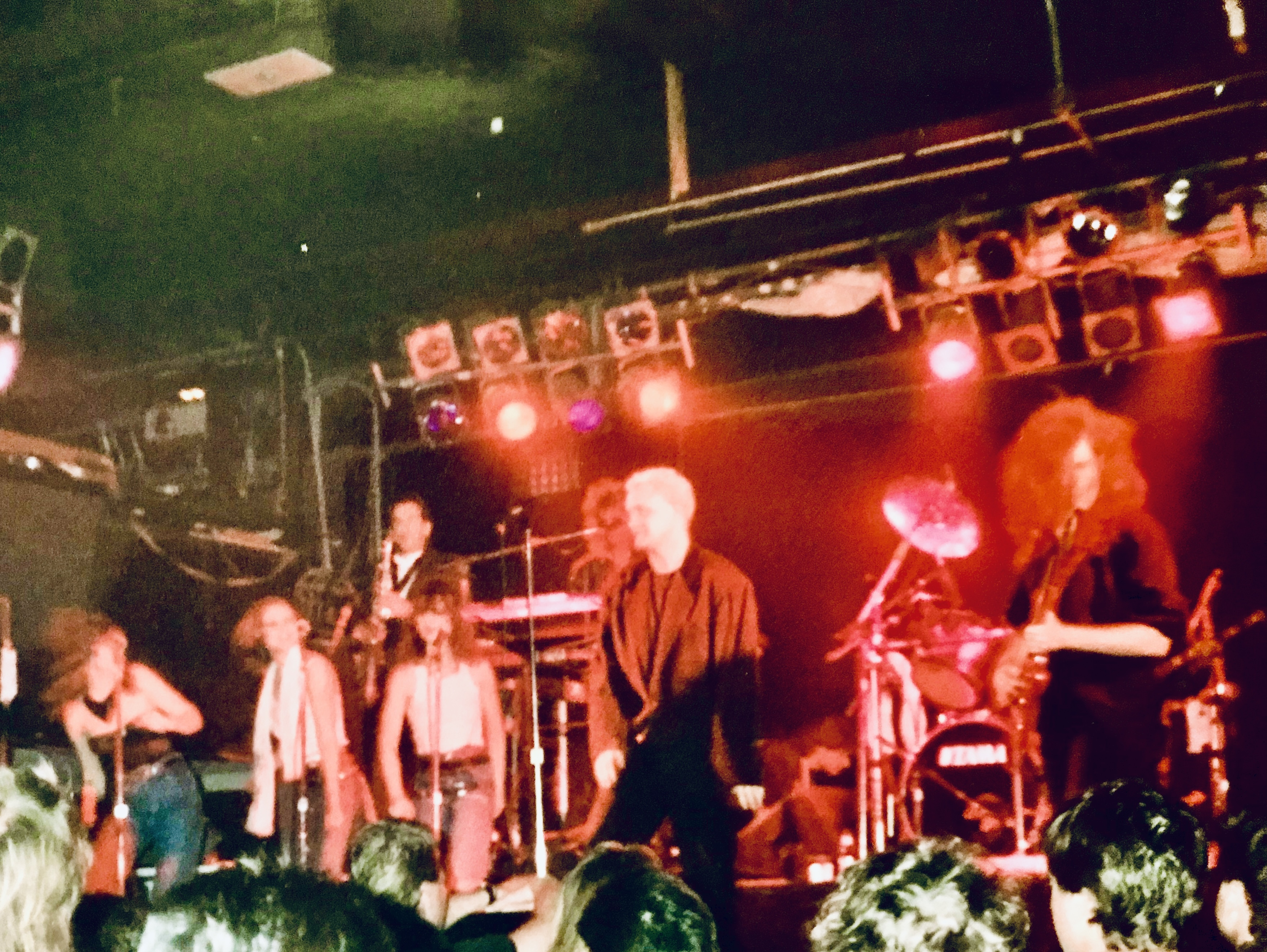
Belouis Some, The Bayou, Georgetown 1988

In the spring of 1988, Some toured the US with band members Carmine Rojas (musical director/bass), Alan Childs (drums), Doug Worthington (guitar), Chuck Kentis (keys), Frank Elmo (sax), Kati Mac and Kim Lesley (backing vocals).

In 1989, Some formed The Big Broadcast. The band toured the UK throughout the summer playing small venues and clubs.

=== 1990–95: Living Your Life ===
In 1993, Belouis Some released the album Living Your Life on BMG Records. The album was recorded at Marcus Recording Studios in London and produced by Geoff Dugmore and Nigel Butler. Musicians included Karl Hyde, Steve Barnacle, Peter Oxendale and J.J. Belle. "Sometimes" and "Something She Said" were released as singles in the UK and Europe.

In 1995, Belouis Some released the single "Let Me Love You for Tonight" produced by Richard "Biff" Stannard (Biffco) and Matt Rowe.

=== 2019–24 ===
In 2019, Belouis Some performed at the '80s oriented Let's Rock summer festivals across the UK.

In February 2023, producer Lee Rose with Belouis Some released a tech house version of "Imagination" on Deevu Records.

In January 2024, it was announced that Belouis Some will join the Alarm and Jay Aston's Gene Loves Jezebel on the "Live Today Love Tomorrow" tour of North America in spring and summer 2024. In April, the tour was postponed due to Mike Peters' (the Alarm) sudden diagnosis of high grade lymphoma. Belouis Some played his first live show in over 30 years at the o2 Academy Islington London in November 2024, as a double bill with Gene Loves Jezebel.

=== 2025–present ===
In February 2025, Some played a headline gig at the Troubadour. Some later announced he would tour the US in April 2025 with Jay Aston's Gene Loves Jezebel on the Hit & Run Tour, playing his first US dates since 1988.

Some joined the Lost 80's Live 23rd anniversary US tour in the summer of 2025.

In December 2025, Belouis Some supported Trevor Horn at the o2 Shepherd's Bush Empire London.

In the spring of 2026, Belouis Some toured the USA – with an additional stop in Toronto, Canada – on his first headlining tour since the 1980s.

The 100 Club in London announced that Belouis Some would headline a show at the venue in December 2026.

In November 2026, Grand Theft Auto VI was released, featuring “Imagination” by Belouis Some on its Vice City FM radio station playlist.

== Personal life ==
In 1996, Keighley acquired the lease to the historic Wellington Club, Knightsbridge, London. The bar, restaurant and nightclub were restored and refurbished, opening in 1997. Keighley closed the club in 1998 and later passed the lease to a new owner.

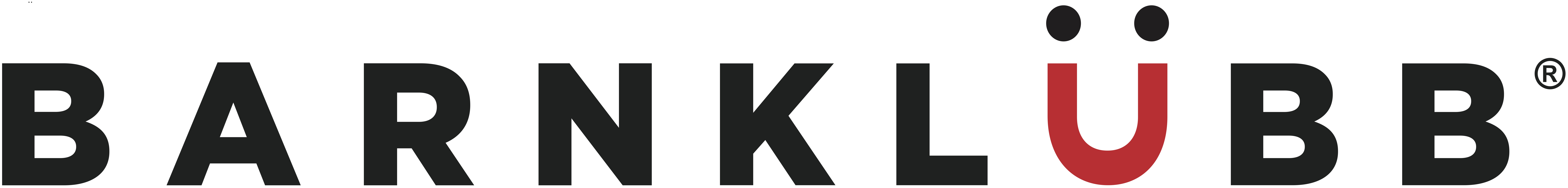
Barnklubb® Kids Club

In 2013, Keighley and Eva Linderholm founded Barnklubb®, a Scandinavian-style day nursery, in Chelsea, London. Barnklubb is now licensed at 8 locations across Japan.

Belouis Some lives in London and is married to Swedish model Eva Linderholm; they have two daughters. Ingrid Keighley is an actress.

== Discography ==
=== Albums ===
- Some People (1985)
- Belouis Some (1987)
- Living Your Life (1993)

=== Singles ===
Year	Title	Peak chart positions											Album
Year	Title	UK	AUS	IRE	BEL (FLA)	GER	SWI	NZ	RSA	US	US Dance	UK Upfront Club	Album
1981	"Lose It to You" (as Nevil Rowe)	—	—	—	—	—	—	—	—	—	—	—	Single only
1984	"Target Practice"	—	—	—	—	—	—	—	—	—	—	—	Some People
1985	"Imagination"	50	90	—	40	48	30	—	13	88	4	—	Some People
1985	"Some People"	33	—	21	—	—	—	—	9	67	8	—	Some People
1986	"Imagination" (reissue)	17	—	16	—	—	—	38	—	—	—	—	Some People
1986	"Target Practice (Bullseye Mix)"	—	—	—	—	—	—	—	16	—	—	—	Some People
1986	"Jerusalem"	98	—	—	—	—	—	—	—	—	—	—	Some People
1986	"Have You Ever Been in Love"	—	—	—	—	—	—	—	—	—	—	—	Some People
1987	"Let It Be with You"	53	—	—	—	—	—	—	—	—	13	—	Belouis Some
1987	"Animal Magic"	—	—	—	—	—	—	—	—	—	6	—	Belouis Some
1988	"Some Girls"	76	—	—	—	—	—	—	—	—	—	—	Belouis Some
1993	"Something She Said"	106	—	—	—	—	—	—	—	—	—	—	Living Your Life
1993	"Sometimes"	—	—	—	—	—	—	—	—	—	—	—	Living Your Life
1995	"Imagination (Remix)"	95	—	—	—	—	—	—	—	—	—	—	Singles only
1995	"Let Me Love You for Tonight"	—	—	—	—	—	—	—	—	—	—	—	Singles only
2023	"Imagination (Lee Rose)"	—	—	—	—	—	—	—	—	—	—	8	Single and Extended Mix
2023	"—" denotes releases that did not chart or were not released.												

== See also ==
- List of performers on Top of the Pops
- Concerts at Knebworth House
- List of Second British Invasion artists
