= Imagination (Belouis Some song) =

Single by Belouis Some

from the album Some People
- B-side: "Have You Ever Been in Love"
- Released: 8 March 1985; 6 January 1986 (UK re-issue)
- Genre: New wave
- Length: 3:32
- Label: Parlophone
- Songwriter: Belouis Some
- Producers: Steve Thompson; Michael Barbiero

Belouis Some singles chronology
"Target Practice" (1984)	"Imagination" (1985)	"Some People" (1985)

"Imagination" is a song by British musician Belouis Some, from his 1985 debut album Some People. Upon its first release as a single in the UK on 8 March 1985, the song only managed to chart at No. 50, but a re-release on 6 January 1986 proved more successful, hitting the top 20 and peaking at No. 17 on the UK Singles Chart in February 1986. In the U.S., the song reached No. 88 on the Billboard Hot 100 in May 1985.

On 10 October 1994, a remix of the song by British electronic band the Beloved (Jon and Helena Marsh) was released as a single on Some's own label Some Music LTD. It reached number 95 on the UK Singles Chart in March 1995.

In February 2023, producer Lee Rose with Belouis Some released a tech house version of "Imagination" on Deevu Records.

== Background ==
Belouis Some has described the song as being "about a British man's encounter with an extremely self-indulgent American woman", and one that "expresses the conflict between reality and dreams". Speaking of the song to Number One in 1986, he commented, "'Imagination' isn't an erotic song because it doesn't go for the jugular in say the same way that Prince does, but it is very suggestive." In a 1985 interview with Record Mirror, he said, "The single's very straight, no gimmicks, it's the song for the song's worth."

== Music video ==
A music video was produced for "Imagination", and was directed by Storm Thorgerson. It caused controversy as it contained full frontal nudity. Some said of the video to Record Mirror in 1985, "It's quite tasteful, not dirty. [Guitarist] Carlos Alomar called me a sexist pig but thought it was wonderful." In an interview with Number One the following year, Belouis Some said of the video's controversy, "It wasn't done to cause a stir, it was done for artistic reasons and we put a lot of our own money into it. It became an obsession for all of us because we believed in it so much." A version of the video without the nudity received medium rotation on MTV.

== Critical reception ==
On its release, Cash Box listed the single as one of their "feature picks" during April 1985. They commented, "With a dour vocal a la Ric Ocasek and a theatrical sensibility, Belouis Some delivers a well produced and interesting debut." Paul Bursche of Number One wrote, "Imagine a David Bowie single from his Young Americans period played by his Let's Dance band and you'll have a fair idea of what this is about. It's played exceptionally well and is a brilliant single."

Di Cross of Record Mirror described the song as "a stomping, assured record sung with Bowiesque conviction". In a review of the 1986 re-issue, Dave Rimmer of Smash Hits said, "Despite one or two winceworthy lines, this is really a bit of a beaut. Deserves to be a hit this time round, I reckon, and probably will be."

== Cover versions and other uses ==
The song was used as a soundtrack for a humorous Barclays Bank advertisement in the 1980s, as well as the 1987 film Ghost Chase. It was sampled by Boyzone members Keith 'N' Shane in their song "Girl You Know It's True" in 2000 and covered by Harry as part of the album The Trouble with... Harry in 2003.

== Charts ==
Chart (1985)	Peak position
Australia (Kent Music Report)	90
Belgium (Ultratop Flanders)	40
Canadian RPM Adult Contemporary Chart	25
German Singles Chart	48
South African Singles Chart	13
Swiss Singles Chart	30
UK Singles Chart	50
U.S. Billboard Hot 100	88
U.S. Billboard Dance/Club Play Singles Chart	4
U.S. Billboard Hot Dance Music/Maxi-Singles Sales Chart	42

Chart (1986)	Peak position
Irish Singles Chart	16
New Zealand Singles Chart	38
UK Singles Chart	17

Chart (1995)	Peak position
UK Singles Chart	95
