= Huddersfield Daily Examiner =

English newspaper

- Type: Daily newspaper
- Format: Tabloid
- Owner: Reach plc
- Editor: Wayne Ankers
- Founded: 1851 (as a weekly, daily since 1871)
- Headquarters: Huddersfield, England
- Circulation: 1,524 (as of 2025)
- ISSN: 0962-1644
- OCLC number: 500150503
- Website: examinerlive.co.uk

The Huddersfield Daily Examiner is an English local daily evening newspaper covering news and sport from Huddersfield, England, and its surrounding areas.

== History ==
The first edition was published as a weekly, starting on 6 September 1851, as the Huddersfield & Holmfirth Examiner, although the 'Holmfirth' was dropped from the title two years later. The newspaper has been published as a daily since 28 January 1871 when journalists on the title worked all weekend in order to forestall a rival and become the town's first daily paper. Since 1999 it has been part of the Trinity Mirror group, which is now known as Reach plc and is the largest newspaper publisher in the United Kingdom.

The Examiner lays claim to a notable first in regional British journalism, as the first provincial UK newspaper to employ a woman journalist, in 1888.

== Recent developments ==
Examiner journalist Adrian Sudbury was given recognition during his battle with terminal leukaemia between 2006 and 2008. His 'Sign up for Sudders' campaign was aimed at encouraging more people to sign up as bone marrow donors, and education packs about blood, bone marrow and organ donation were sent out to schools across the country. Sudbury died at his family home in Sheffield in August 2008.

Roy Wright served as the editor of the Examiner between 2002 and 2017. During this period, the newspaper, along with the local media industry more generally, underwent significant change. One notable shift took place in 2004, when the Examiner swapped its traditional broadsheet format for a tabloid or 'compact' size. At this time, printing of the paper left Huddersfield, to be centralised at Trinity Mirror's Chadderton facility in Oldham. In 2008, the Examiner switched to overnight printing, making the paper available earlier each day. The Examiner then moved from its base on Queen Street South to new premises at Pennine Business Park in Bradley. It maintained a small town centre office for two years, but this closed in 2013. A daily iPad version of the newspaper began in the same year. Announcing his departure in 2017, Wright said the Examiner had been transformed from a "black and white on-the-day broadsheet" to a "genuine multimedia newsroom".

The Examiner has played a leading role in the campaign to try to prevent the closure of the Accident and Emergency Unit at Huddersfield Royal Infirmary. The 'Hands Off HRI' campaign began in January 2016, and journalists at the paper have promised to continue it despite a series of official setbacks.

Wayne Ankers was appointed editor of the Examiner in January 2017. He had previously worked for sister paper the Manchester Evening News as an associate editor of content. Under Ankers' stewardship, circulation has dropped by more than 80 percent from 12,046 to 1,524 in 2025.

The Examiner rebranded its website as 'Examiner Live' in September 2018. During 2019 and 2020, the Examiner took part in a five-month trial of charging readers 25p to access certain stories. The experiment came to an end in February 2020.

== Former journalists ==
- Stephen Booth, crime writer, author of the Cooper & Fry series.
