= Steve Thompson (musician) =

American record producer and remixer

Steve Thompson is an American record producer and remixer who has worked with artists including Guns N' Roses, Life of Agony, Tesla, Madonna, John Lennon, Wu-Tang Clan and Korn.

== Biography ==
Steve Thompson is a native New Yorker. As a youth, he worked as a DJ in New York City. He was mentored by music moguls David Geffen and Clive Davis early in his career. At Geffen Records, he got his first real break in the rock genre as a mixer on the 1987 Guns N' Roses album Appetite for Destruction that would become Geffen's most successful album.

He is a long-time collaborator with mixing engineer Michael Barbiero, with whom he shares credits on albums such as Appetite for Destruction and The Great Radio Controversy by Tesla. He mixed Metallica's 1988 album ...And Justice for All.

Along with Barbiero he has completed remixes for acts including A-ha and David Bowie & Mick Jagger's take on "Dancing in the Street."

== Awards ==
=== Grammy Awards ===
- Aretha Franklin and George Michael: "I Knew You Were Waiting (For Me)" (1990)
- Whitney Houston: "I Wanna Dance with Somebody (Who Loves Me)"
- Cutting Crew: Broadcast
- Korn: Follow the Leader
- Ziggy Marley: "People Get Ready"
- Blues Traveller: "Run-Around"
