= New York Voices =

American jazz group

- Genres: Jazz, vocal jazz
- Years active: 1986–present
- Label: GRP
- Members: Peter Eldridge; Lauren Kinhan; Darmon Meader; Kim Nazarian
- Past members: Caprice Fox; Sara Krieger
- Website: www.newyorkvoices.com

New York Voices is a jazz vocal group that was founded in 1987 by Peter Eldridge, Caprice Fox, Sara Krieger, Darmon Meader, and Kim Nazarian. All except Krieger were members of an alumni group from Ithaca College that toured Europe in 1986. They began performing as the New York Voices in 1988 and issued their debut album the following year. Sara Krieger left in 1992 and was replaced by Lauren Kinhan. After Caprice Fox left, the group became a quartet.

== Discography ==
- New York Voices (GRP, 1989)
- Hearts of Fire (GRP, 1991)
- What's Inside (GRP, 1993)
- New York Voices Sing the Songs of Paul Simon (RCA Victor, 1998)
- Sing! Sing! Sing! (Concord Jazz, 2001)
- Brazilian Dreams with Paquito D'Rivera, Claudio Roditi (MCG Jazz, 2002)
- A Day Like This (MCG Jazz, 2007)
- Let It Snow (Five Cent, 2013)
- Meeting of Minds with Bob Mintzer Big Band (MCG Jazz, 2018)
- Reminiscing in Tempo (Origin, 2019)

=== As guest ===
- Count Basie, Live at Manchester Craftsmen's Guild (MCG Jazz, 1996)
- Till Bronner, The Christmas Album (Bam Bam Music, 2007)
- Ann Hampton Callaway, Signature (N-Coded, 2002)
- Ann Hampton Callaway, The Hope of Christmas (MCG Jazz, 2016)
- Renee Fleming, I Want Magic! (London, 1998)
- Jim Hall, By Arrangement (Telarc, 1998)
- Don Sebesky, I Remember Bill (RCA Victor, 1998)
