= Latin Grammy Award for Best Latin Jazz/Jazz Album =

Music award category

Latin Grammy Award for Best Latin Jazz Album
- Awarded for: quality albums in the Latin jazz music genre
- Country: United States
- Presented by: The Latin Recording Academy
- First award: 2000
- Currently held by: Hamilton de Holanda for Hamilton de Holanda Trio - Live In NYC; Chucho Valdés & Royal Quartet for Cuba and Beyond (2025)
- Website: LatinGrammy.com

The Latin Grammy Award for Best Latin Jazz/Jazz Album is an honor presented annually at the Latin Grammy Awards, a ceremony that recognizes excellence and creates a wider awareness of cultural diversity and contributions of Latin recording artists in the United States and internationally. The award has been given to artists since the 1st Latin Grammy Awards in 2000 for vocal or instrumental albums containing more than half of their playing time of newly recorded material in Spanish or Portuguese. Latin jazz is a mixture of musical genres, including Afro-Caribbean and Pan-American rhythms with the harmonic structure of jazz. Other jazz genres may also be considered for inclusion by the Jazz Committee.

The award was first presented as a tie between Michel Camilo and Tomatito for Spain and Paquito D'Rivera for Tropicana Nights. D'Rivera holds the record for most wins as a performer in this category, with seven (including one awarded to the Paquito D'Rivera Quintet) out of eight nominations. Bebo Valdés won the award twice for albums that also earned the Grammy Award: Bebo de Cuba received the Best Traditional Tropical Latin Album accolade in 2005, while Juntos Para Siempre, by Bebo and Chucho Valdés won for Latin Jazz Album in 2010. Chucho Valdés has won the award five times, while Bebo, Camilo, D'Rivera, Gonzalo Rubalcaba, and Arturo Sandoval have been awarded twice. In 2012, the award was given to Sandoval for the album Dear Diz (Every Day I Think of You), which was also nominated for Album of the Year. Since its inception, the award has been presented to musicians or ensembles originating from Brazil, Cuba, the Dominican Republic, the United States, and Spain.

== Recipients ==
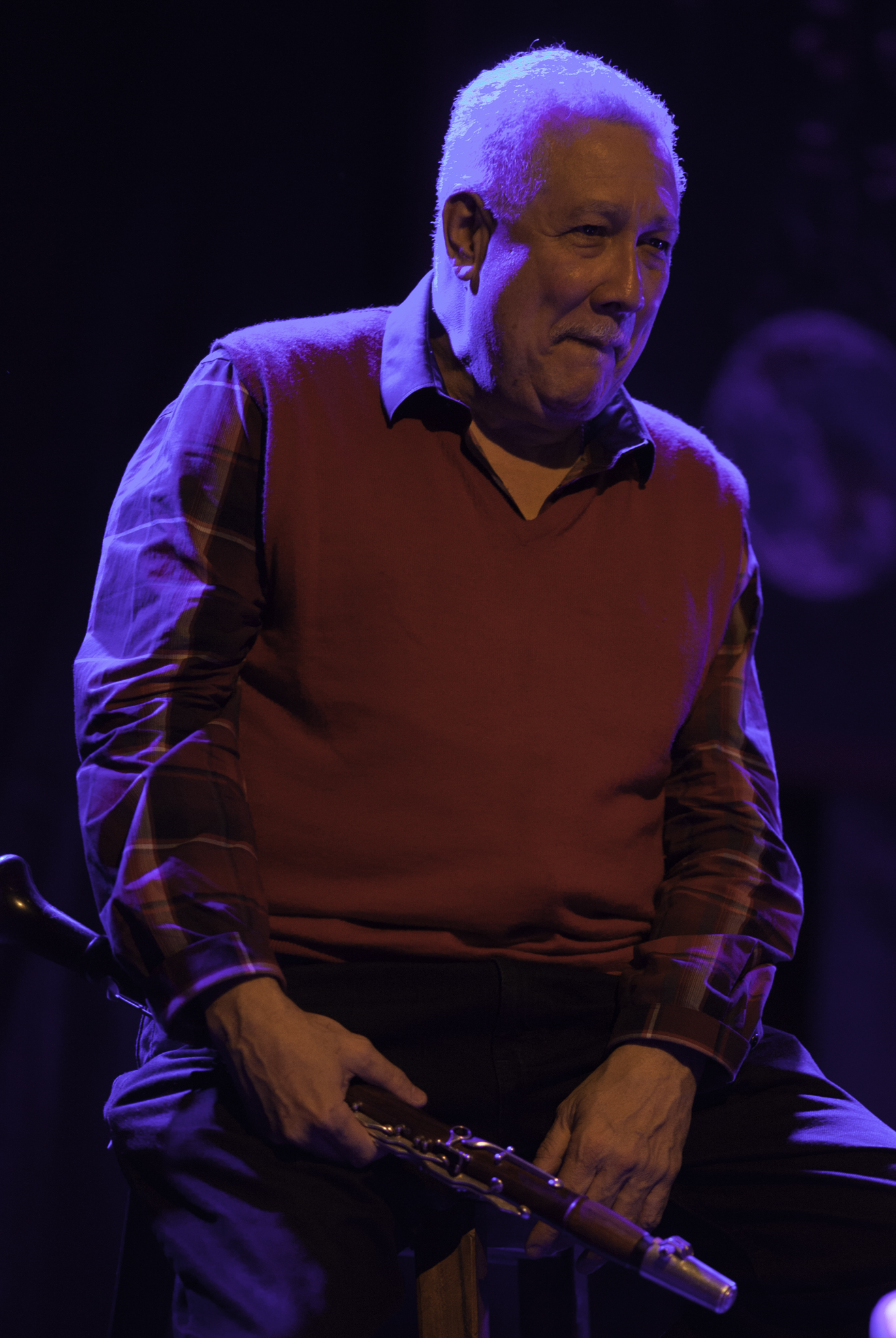
Seven-time winner, Paquito D'Rivera

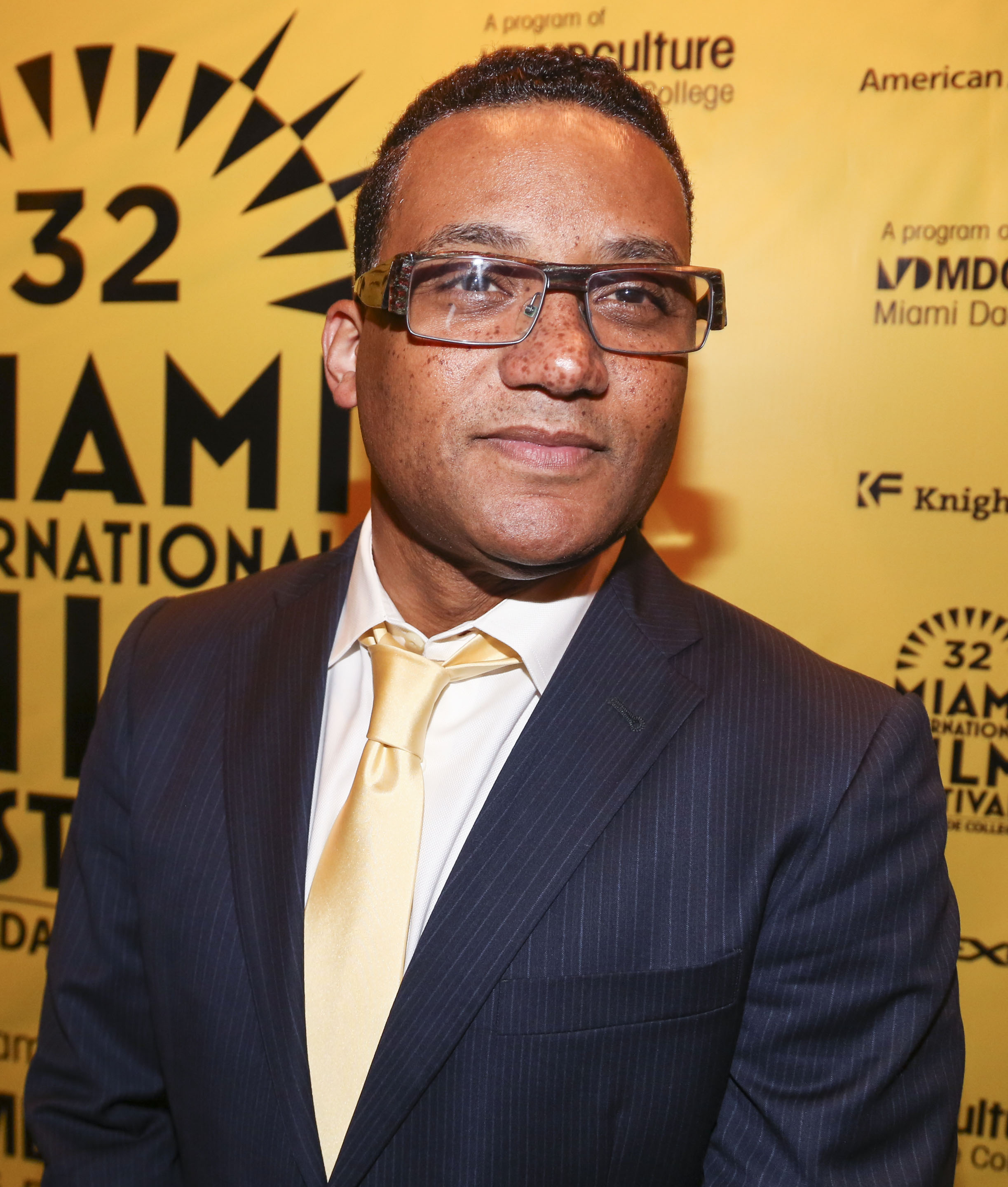
Two-time winner Gonzalo Rubalcaba.

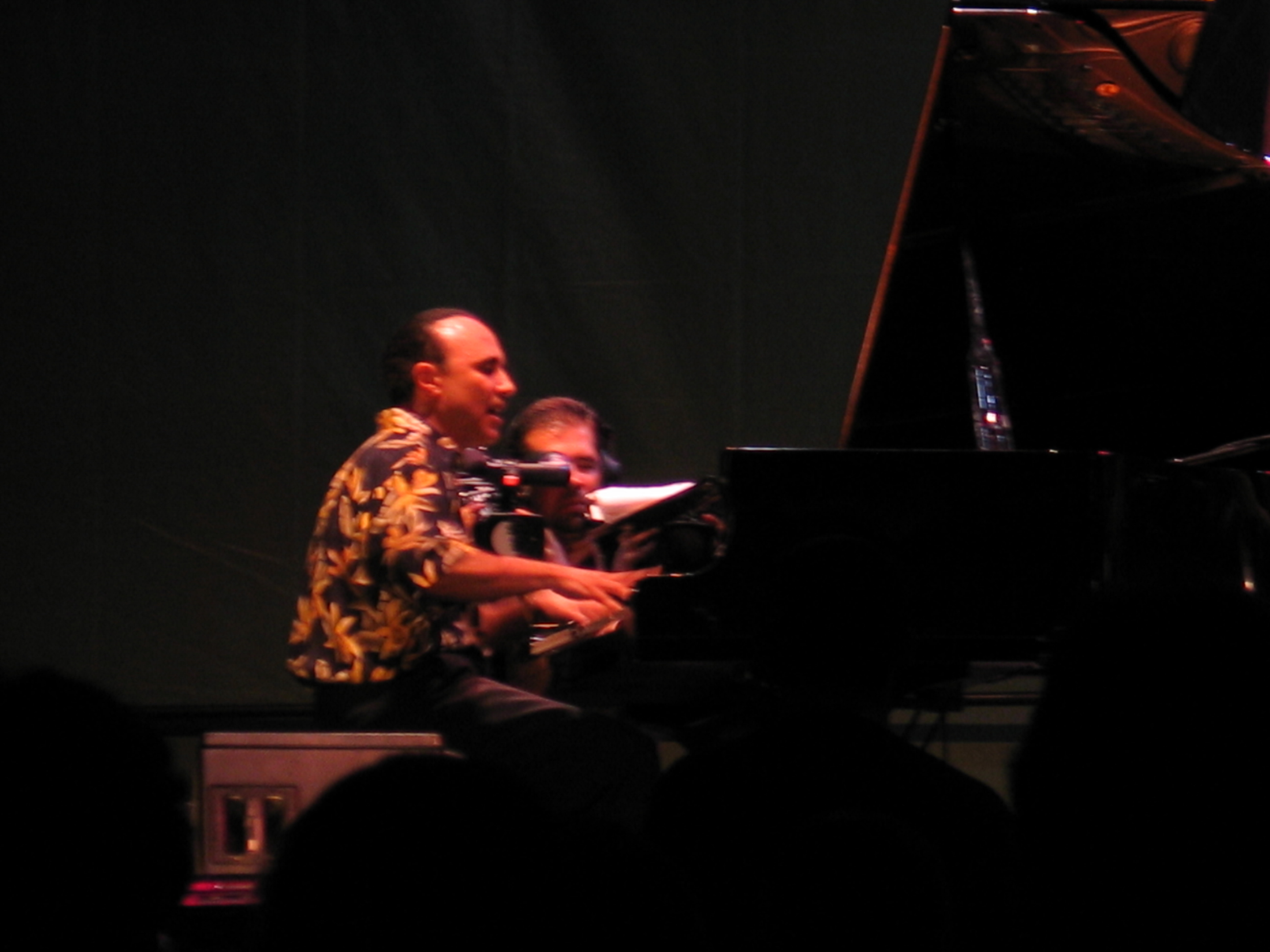
Michel Camilo received the award in 2000 for his album Spain and in 2013 for What's Up?

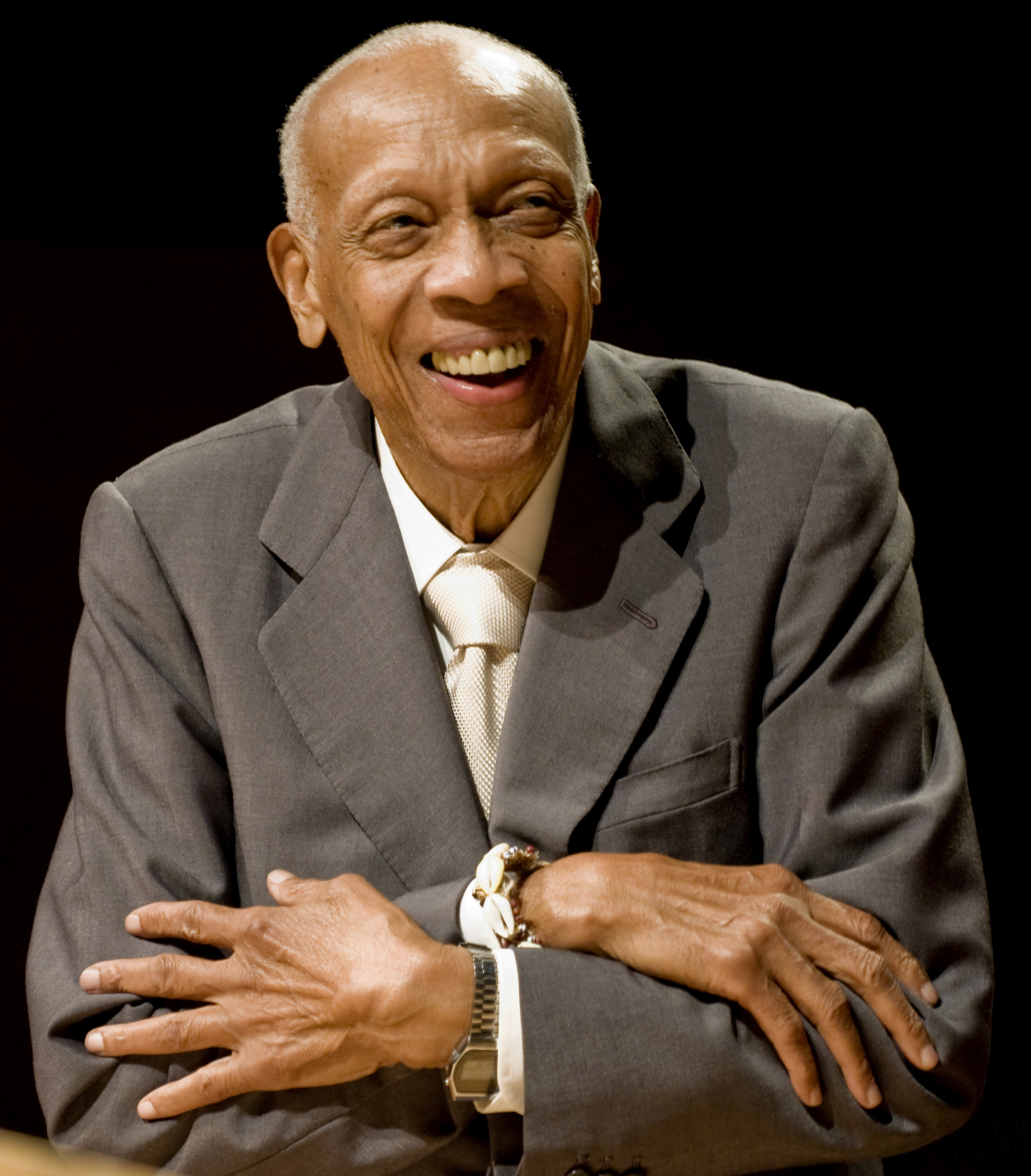
Bebo Valdés, awarded twice in this category and in the same field for the Grammy Awards

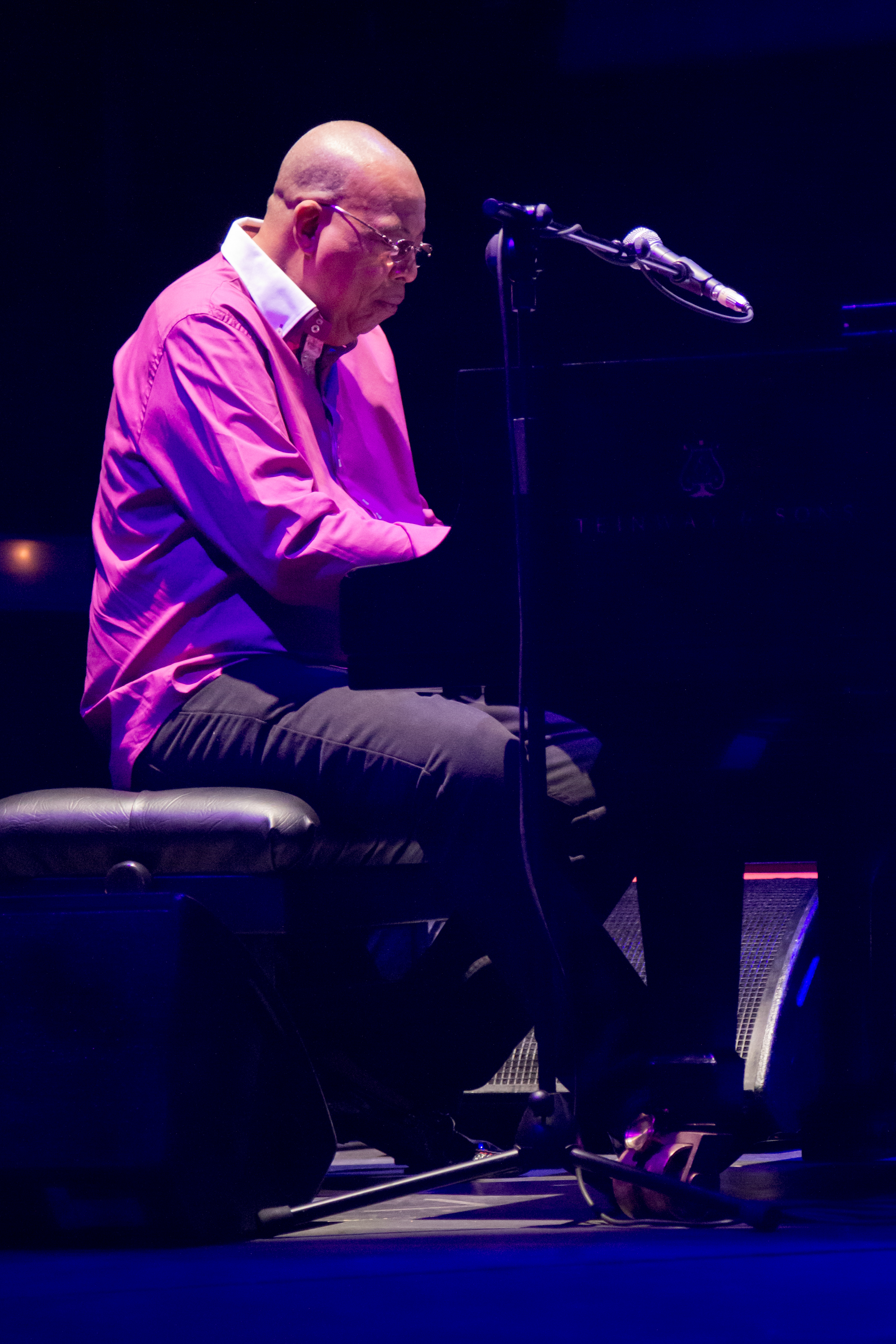
Six-time winner Chucho Valdés.

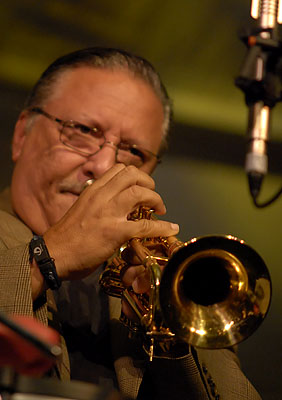
Two-time winner Arturo Sandoval.

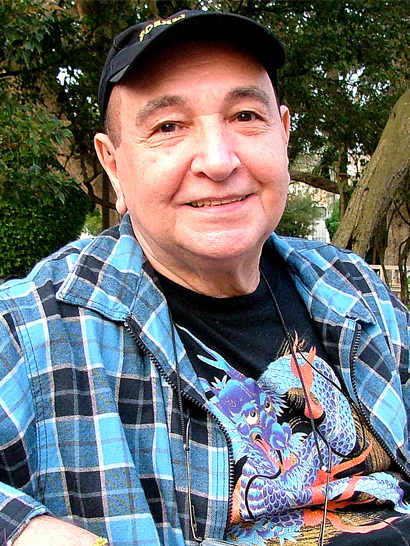
2010 winner João Donato.

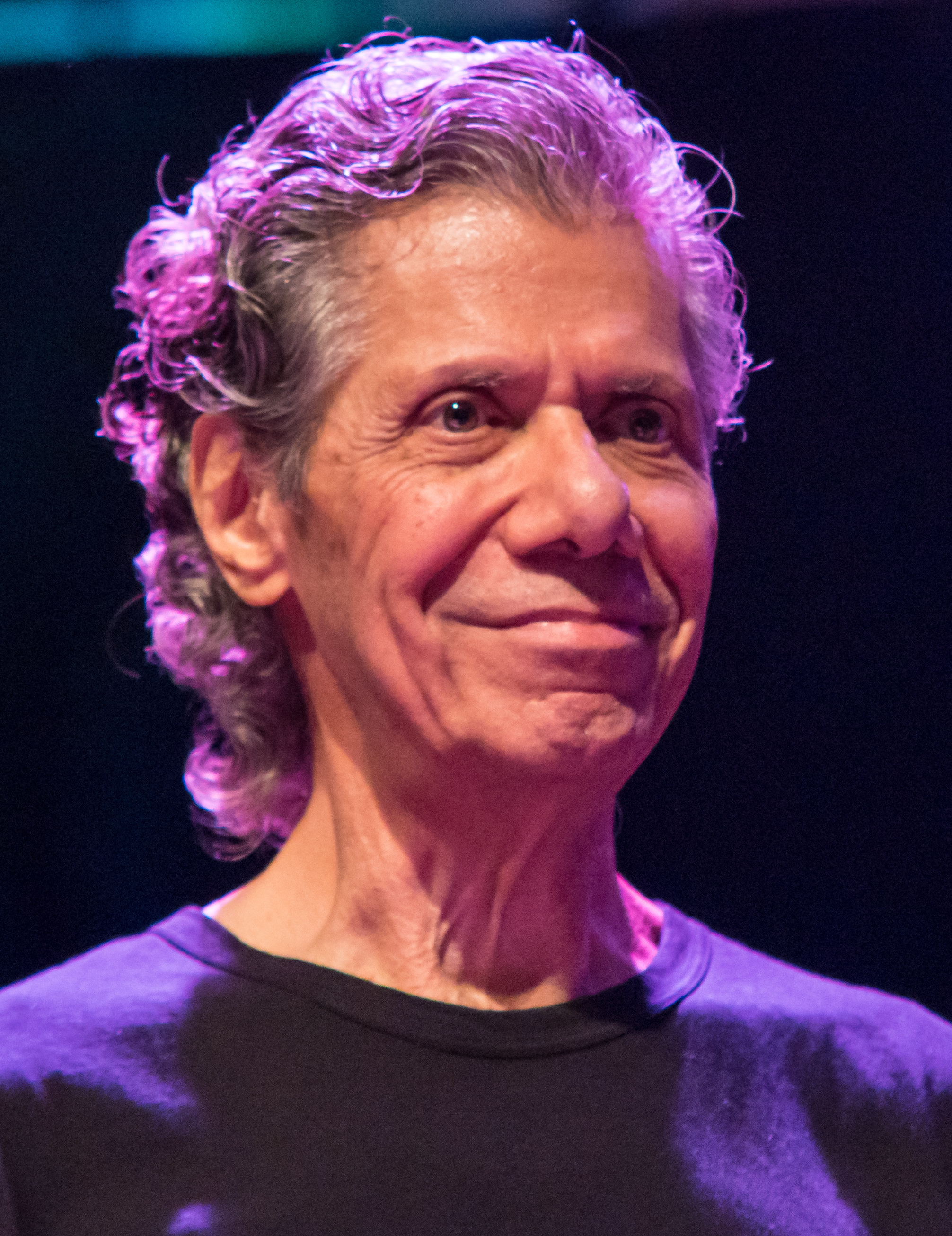
Two-time winner Chick Corea.

Year^{[I]}	Performing artist(s)	Work	Nominees^{[II]}	Ref.
2000	Michel Camilo & Tomatito	Spain	Adrián Iaies Trio – Las Tardecitas de Minton's; Chico O'Farrill – Heart of a Legend; Lalo Schifrin – Latin Jazz Suite	
2000	Paquito D'Rivera	Tropicana Nights	Adrián Iaies Trio – Las Tardecitas de Minton's; Chico O'Farrill – Heart of a Legend; Lalo Schifrin – Latin Jazz Suite	
2001	Paquito D'Rivera Quintet	Live at the Blue Note	Chico O'Farrill – Carambola; Danilo Pérez – Motherland; David Sánchez – Melaza; Chucho Valdés – Solo: Live in New York; Various Artists; Julio Martí & Fernando Trueba (producers) – Calle 54	
2002	Gonzalo Rubalcaba	Supernova	Richie Beirach, Gregor Huebner & George Mraz – Round About Federico Monpou; William Cepeda – Expandiendo Raíces/Branching Out; Charlie Haden and Gonzalo Rubalcaba – Norturne; Omar Sosa – Sentir	
2003	Paquito D'Rivera	Brazilian Dreams	Alex Acuña & Justo Almario with Tolú – Bongó de Van Gogh; Gato Barbieri – The Shadow of the Cat; Eddie Palmieri – La Perfecta II; Esperança Hermeto Pascoal e Grupo – Mundo Verde; Chucho Valdés – Fantasía Cubana	
2004	Chucho Valdés	New Conceptions	Jerry González y Los Piratas del Flamenco – Jerry González y Los Piratas del Flamenco; Santos Neto Quinteto – Canto do Rio Jovino; Diego Urcola – Soundances; Bebo Valdés & Federico Britos – We Could Make Such Beautiful Music Together	
2005	Bebo Valdés	Bebo de Cuba	Paoli Mejias – Mi Tambor; Bob Mintzer, Giovanni Hidalgo, Andy González, David Chesky & Randy Brecker – The Body Acoustic; Negroni's Trio – Piano/Drums/Bass; Poncho Sanchez – Poncho At Montreaux	
2006	Gonzalo Rubalcaba	Solo	Ed Motta – Aystelum; Eddie Palmieri – Listen Here!; Jovino Santos-Neto – Roda Carioca; Dave Valentin – World on a String	
2007	Arturo Sandoval	Rumba Palace	Michel Camilo & Tomatito – Spain Again; Michel Camilo – Spirit of the Moment; Paquito D'Rivera Quintet? – Funk Tango; Chucho Valdés – Keys of Latin Jazz	
2008	Caribbean Jazz Project and Dave Samuels	Afro Bop Alliance	Rodolfo Stroeter, Tutty Moreno, André Mehmari, Teco Cardoso, Nailor Proveta Azevedo – Nonada; Hamilton de Holanda Quinteto – Brasilianos 2; David Sánchez – Cultural Survival; Charlie Sepúlveda & The Turnaround – Charlie Sepulveda & The Turnaround	
2009	Bebo Valdés & Chucho Valdés	Juntos Para Siempre	Brazilian Trio – Forests; Bobby Sanabria conducting the Manhattan School of Music Afro-Cuban Jazz Orchestra – Kenya Revisited Live!!!; Charlie Sepúlveda & The Turnaround – Sepulveda Boulevard; Néstor Torres – Nouveau Latino	
2010	João Donato Trio	Sambolero	Isaac Delgado – L-O-V-E; Mark Levine & The Latin Tinge – Off and On: The Music of Moacir Santos; Poncho Sanchez – Psychedelic Blues; Chucho Valdés – Cuban Dreams; Miguel Zenón – Esta Plena	
2011	Paquito D'Rivera	Panamericana Suite	Paquito D'Rivera and Pepe Rivero – Clazz: Continental Latin Jazz. Live at Barcelona, Teatre Paral.lel 2011; Bobby Sanabria conducting The Manhattan School of Music Afro-Cuban Jazz Orchestra – Tito Puente Masterworks Live!!!; Chucho Valdés – New York Is Now! / Viva El Sonido Cubano; Dave Valentin – Pure Imagination	
2012	Arturo Sandoval	Dear Diz (Every Day I Think of You)	Jerry Gonzalez & El Comando de la Clave – Jerry González and El Comando de la Clave; Tania Maria – Tempo; Poncho Sanchez & Terence Blanchard – Chano y Dizzy!; Chuchito Valdes – Live in Chicago	
2013	Michel Camilo	What's Up?	The Clare Fischer Latin Jazz Big Band – ¡Ritmo!; Negroni's Trio – On The Way; Poncho Sanchez and his Latin Jazz Band – Live in Hollywood; Chucho Valdés & The Afro-Cuban Messengers – Border Free; Chuchito Valdés – Grand Piano Live	
2014	Chick Corea	The Vigil	Juan Garcia-Herreros "Snow Owl" – Normas; Arturo O'Farrill & The Afro Latin Jazz Orchestra – The Offense of the Drum; Luisito Quintero – 3rd Element	
2014	Paquito D'Rivera and Trío Corrente	Song for Maura	Juan Garcia-Herreros "Snow Owl" – Normas; Arturo O'Farrill & The Afro Latin Jazz Orchestra – The Offense of the Drum; Luisito Quintero – 3rd Element	
2015	Paquito D'Rivera	Jazz Meets The Classics	Eddie Fernández – Jazzeando; Iván "Melón" Lewis – Ayer y Hoy; José Negroni – Negroni Piano +9; José Valentino Ruiz and the Latin Jazz Ensemble featuring Giovanni Hidalgo – I Make You Want To Move	
2016	Arturo O'Farrill & The Afro Latin Jazz Orchestra	Cuba: The Conversation Continues	Mario Adnet – Jobim Jazz (Ao Vivo); Antonio Adolfo – Tropical Infinito; Raul Agraz – Between Brothers; Carrera Quinta – Big Band	
2017	Eliane Elias	Dance of Time	Antonio Adolfo – Hybrido / From Rio To Wayne Shorter; Oskar Cartaya – Bajo Mundo; Charlie Sepúlveda & The Turnaround – Mr. EP - A Tribute to Eddie Palmieri; Miguel Zenón – Típico	
2018	Hermeto Pascoal & Big Band	Naturaleza Universal	Adrian Iaies Trio – La Casa de un Pianista de Jazz; Dafnis Prieto Big Band – Back to the Sunset; Néstor Torres – Jazz Flute Traditions; Bobby Valentin & The Latin Jazzists – Mind of a Master	
2019	Chucho Valdés	Jazz Batá 2	Claudia Acuña – Turning Pages; Branly, Ruiz & Haslip – Elemental; Dos Orientales – Tercer Viaje; André Marques – Rio - São Paulo	
2020	Emilio Solla Tango Jazz Orchestra	Puertos: Music from International Waters	Afro-Peruvian Jazz Orchestra – Tradiciones; Chick Corea & the Spanish Heart Band – Antidote; David Sánchez – Carib; Miguel Zenón – Sonero: The Music of Ismael Rivera	
2021	Iván "Melón" Lewis	Voyager	Antonio Adolfo – Bruma: Celebrating Milton Nascimiento; Roxana Amed – Ontology; Edmar Castañeda – Family; Miguel Zenón & Luis Perdomo – El Arte del Bolero	
2022	Eliane Elias, Chick Corea, Chucho Valdés	Mirror Mirror	Antonio Adolfo – Jobim Forever; Martin Bejerano – #Cubanamerican; Chano Domínguez, Rubem Dantas & Hamilton de Holanda – Chabem	
2023	Chucho Valdés & Paquito D'Rivera (with Reunion Sextet)	I Missed You Too!	Roxana Amed – Unánime; Hamilton de Holanda featuring Thiago Rabello & Salomão Soares – Flying Chicken; Iván "Melon" Lewis & The Cuban Swing Express – Bembé; William Maestre Big Band – Semblanzas	
2024	Hermeto Pascoal & Grupo	Pra Você, Ilza	Hamilton de Holanda & Gonzalo Rubalcaba – Collab; Sammy Figueroa featuring Gonzalo Rubalcaba & Aymée Nuviola – Searching for a Memory (Busco Tu Recuerdo); Ivan Lins – My Heart Speaks; Miguel Zenón & Luis Perdomo – El Arte del Bolero, Vol. 2	
2025	Hamilton de Holanda	Hamilton de Holanda Trio - Live In NYC	Paquito D'Rivera & Madrid-New York Connection Band – La Fleur de Cayenne; Iván "Melon" Lewis Trio – Luces y Sombras; Miguel Zenón – Golden City	
2025	Chucho Valdés & Royal Quartet	Cuba and Beyond	Paquito D'Rivera & Madrid-New York Connection Band – La Fleur de Cayenne; Iván "Melon" Lewis Trio – Luces y Sombras; Miguel Zenón – Golden City	

^{^[I]} Each year is linked to the article about the Latin Grammy Awards held that year.
^{^[II]} The name of the performer and the nominated album.

== See also ==
- Billboard Latin Music Award for Latin Jazz Album of the Year
- Grammy Award for Best Latin Jazz Album
