= Best Latin Jazz Album =

Best Latin Jazz Album may refer to one of the following:

- Grammy Award for Best Latin Jazz Album
- Latin Grammy Award for Best Latin Jazz Album
