= Brazilian Dreams =

Live album by Paquito D'Rivera featuring New York Voices and Claudio Roditi
- Released: August 27, 2002
- Recorded: April 26–29, 2001
- Genre: Jazz
- Length: 53:56
- Label: MCG Jazz
- Producer: Jay Ashby

Paquito D'Rivera chronology
Este Camino Largo (2002)	Brazilian Dreams (2002)	Big Band Time (2003)

Brazilian Dreams is a live album by Cuban jazz performer Paquito D'Rivera. It was recorded at the Manchester Craftsmen's Guild in Pittsburgh, Pennsylvania, between April 26 and 29, 2001, and released by MCG Jazz on August 27, 2002. The album features guest performances by the American vocal group New York Voices and trumpeter Claudio Roditi. In the United States, it peaked at number 22 on Billboard's Top Jazz Albums chart.

Produced by Jay Ashby, the album features seven songs written by Brazilian performers including Antônio Carlos Jobim, Luiz Bonfá, João Donato and Caetano Veloso, and three original songs, and was conceived as a tribute to the music of Brazil of which D'Rivera has always been an admirer. Brazilian Dreams received mixed reviews by critics, some praising the performers and the musical selection, and others being critical about the lack of improvement on the arrangements on the classic songs of the genre included. The album earned D'Rivera the Latin Grammy Award for Best Latin Jazz Album.

== Background and release ==
Cuban saxophonist and clarinet player Paquito D'Rivera decided to record an album paying tribute to Brazilian music after being invited by several Brazilian performers to play their native music. D'Rivera also featured in Americanos: Latino Life in the United States, a 2000 documentary produced by American actor Edward James Olmos, representing Brazil. "I feel a great passion for the culture and music of Brazil, and it gives me pleasure to declare publicly that my heart is half Brazilian," D'Rivera declared on his autobiography My Sax Life (2005). The album features the American group New York Voices since D'Rivera has always been an admirer of vocal quartets and wanted to "kill two birds with one stone". He further explained that in Cuba "musicians listened to radio stations from Miami mostly for the jingles sung by gringo vocal groups." Brazilian Dreams was released by MCG Jazz on August 27, 2002 and was the tenth album recorded by the Manchester Craftsmen's Guild, following A Nancy Wilson Christmas by Nancy Wilson, Joe Williams Presents: Nicole Yarling Live at The Manchester Craftsman Guild and the Dizzy Gillespie All-Stars's Things to Come, among others.

== Content ==
Brazilian Dreams was recorded live at the Manchester Craftsmen's Guild in Pittsburgh, Pennsylvania between April 26 and 29, 2001. The album includes ten songs and features Kim Nazarian, Lauren Kinhan, Darmon Meader and Peter Eldridge of the New York Voices as backing vocalists. Performer Claudio Roditi is also featured playing trumpet, while D'Rivera plays clarinet. Most of the songs included are written by Brazilian songwriters paying homage to the music of the country; the setlist includes eight songs written by Antônio Carlos Jobim, Gene Lees, Luiz Bonfá, Matt Dubey, João Donato, Caetano Veloso and three original songs by Roditi and D'Rivera. The first track, "Corcovado", includes a "vocal texture" inspired by Brazilian vocal groups Quarteto em Cy, MPB4 and The Swingle Singers. "One for Tom" is based on "Se todos fossem iguas a voce" by Jobim and features a tenor sax solo by Darmon Meader. "Meu Amigo" is supported by D'Rivera's clarinet and backing vocals in "an exquisite interplay of harmonies and solo sax with the slightest bass." "Retrato Em Branco E Prêto" features Nazarian performing vocals in Portuguese language.

== Reception and accolades ==
Professional ratings
Review scores
Source	Rating
All About Jazz	(positive)
AllMusic	4/5 stars
Billboard	(mixed)
Jazz Review	5/5 stars
JazzTimes	(negative)
PopMatters	(positive)

Brazilian Dreams received mixed reviews from critics. Paula Edelstein of AllMusic gave the album four stars out of five, praising the performer skills "leading his own ensembles or playing with renowned jazz masters, Paquito D'Rivera continues to make a decidedly fresh imprint on Latin and Brazilian jazz." William Grim of All About Jazz wrote that Brazilian Dreams was "a very satisfying album" hoping that D'Rivera, Roditi and the New York Voices record another album based on Brazilian music due to the large extension of the musical catalog of the country. C. Michael Bailey, also of All About Jazz, stated that the album "is superb and fantastic in every way." Morrice Blackwell of Jazz Review named the album a "musical match made in heaven", praising the performers and the sound quality, considering that it is a live performance. Blackwell also commented on the Manchester Craftsmen's Guild which "continually offer a complete jazz experience." On a second review by Jazz Review, Lee Prosser referred to the album as a "classic Brazilian music collection... something all jazz listeners can appreciate, enjoy, and want to have in their CD library collections", to finally declare that it was "one of the very finest collections of music released in the year 2002." Maurice Bottomley of PopMatters wrote that the record is "gentle, cultured, and perhaps overly refined, but it is very accomplished and does actually swing," further commenting that "it is also truer to the spirit of bossa nova in its first North American flowering than some will care to admit."

However, Leila Cobo of Billboard magazine was critical about the fact that some tracks do not add much to the originals, but the album "stays merely pleasant, notably in 'Desafinado' and 'Manhã de Carnaval / Gentle Rain'." On a negative review by Mike Quinn of JazzTimes stated that the album should be renamed "Brazilian Nightmares" and it is "impossible to escape the insipid vocal stylings of the 'New York Voices' or the cliched horn arrangements that can be heard on bossa nova records going back as far as the '50s." Quinn was also critical of the repertoire since "Brazil has produced more music than the usual 20 or 30 tunes that keep getting led to the butcher's block."

Brazilian Dreams reached number 35 at the CMJ Jazz Albums chart and peaked at number 22 on Billboard's Top Jazz Albums chart. D'Rivera was awarded the Latin Grammy Award for Best Latin Jazz Album at the 4th Latin Grammy Awards, and with this recognition became the only performer to receive accolades in the Jazz and Classical music fields, after his album Historia del Soldado (Histoire du soldat by Igor Stravinsky) earned the Best Classical Album at the same ceremony.

== Track listing ==
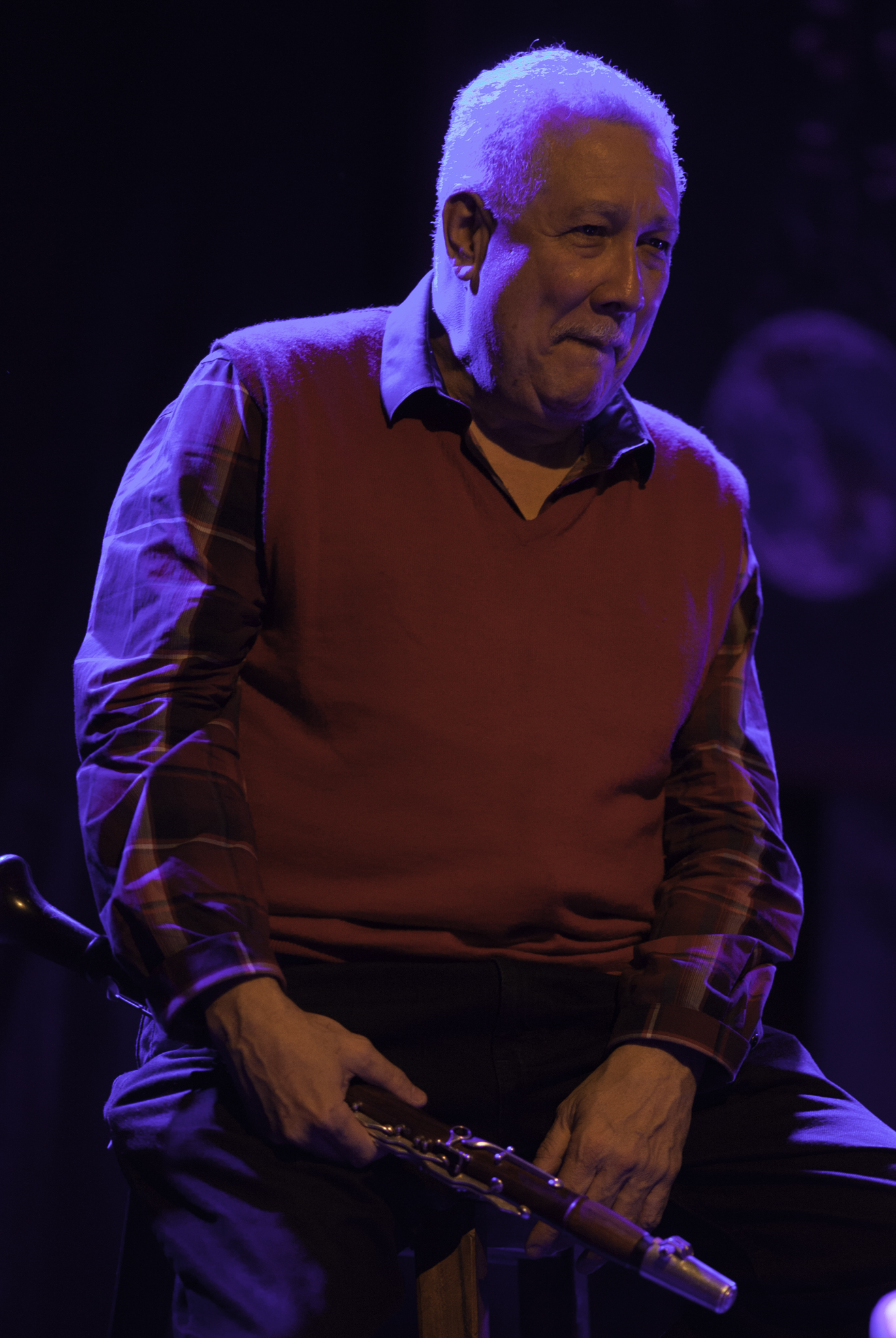
D'Rivera in 2013

No.	Title	Writer(s)	Length
1.	"Corcovado"	Antônio Carlos Jobim, Gene Lees	7:27
2.	"One for Tom"	David Samuels, Paquito D'Rivera	5:04
3.	"Manhã de Carnaval / Gentle Rain"	Luiz Bonfá, Matt Dubey	5:35
4.	"Desafinado"	Jobim	4:52
5.	"Modinha"	Jobim, Kim Nazarian	4:28
6.	"Meu Amigo"	Jobim	4:06
7.	"A Rá"	João Donato, Caetano Veloso	6:53
8.	"Retrato Em Branco E Preto"	Jobim	6:05
9.	"Red on Red"	Claudio Roditi	4:08
10.	"Snow Samba"	Roditi, D'Rivera	5:18
Total length:			53:56

Track listing adapted from AllMusic.

== Personnel ==
- Hélio Alves – piano
- Jay Ashby – arranger, mixing, producer, trombone
- Marty Ashby – executive producer, guitar, liner notes
- Luiz Bonfá – composer
- Bill Bonidie – production coordination
- Robert Bowman – photography
- Paulinho Braga – drums
- Paquito D'Rivera – clarinet, composer, main performer, sax (alto)
- João Donato – composer
- Matt Dubey – composer
- Jay Dudt – engineer, mixing
- Dario Eskenazi – arranger
- Renée Govanucci – associate producer
- Antônio Carlos Jobim – composer
- Gene Lees – composer
- Jim Manly – layout design
- Darmon Meader – arranger, sax (tenor), scat, soloist, vocals
- David Mills – production coordination
- New York Voices – guest artist
  - Peter Eldridge – arranger, vocals
  - Lauren Kinhan – vocals
  - Darmon Meader – vocals
  - Kim Nazarian – composer, vocals
- Claudio Roditi – composer, trumpet
- David Samuels – composer
- Oscar Stagnaro – bass
- Caetano Veloso – composer

Credits are adapted from AllMusic.
