= Toc-Toc (album) =

Studio album by Ed Motta
- Released: September 25, 2026
- Studios: Dwitza Studio, Rio de Janeiro, Rio de Janeiro, Brazil
- Genres: Jazz; Soft rock; Pop
- Length: 44:29
- Labels: Dwitza; MPS
- Producers: Ed Motta; Michel Limma

Ed Motta chronology
Behind the Tea Chronicles (2023)	Toc-Toc (2026)

Toc-Toc is the fifteenth album by Brazilian singer and musician Ed Motta, released on September 25, 2026, by Dwitza in partnership with the German label MPS. It is his first album in Portuguese language in 13 years. The album draws on elements of jazz, soft rock, and pop.

== Background ==
Following the release of three works in English language, Perpetual Gateways, Criterion of the Senses, and Behind the Tea Chronicles, the release of Toc-Toc marked Brazilian musician Ed Motta’s return to composing in Portuguese. In an interview with journalist Thiago Gelli of Veja magazine about his return to making music in Portuguese, Ed said: “I’ve been making English-language music for thirteen years and I’ve missed our language. A lot of people have asked me for this, and I wanted to write lyrics that would complement my sound. This time, the words align with American funk, which is a more accessible genre.”

All the songs were co-written by Ed and his wife, comic book artist Edna Lopes, with the exception of Glamour Hotel, which was co-written with composer Leoni, a former member of the band Kid Abelha. The album was recorded in Rio de Janeiro, with music production orchestrated by Ed Motta himself alongside Michel Limma, and was completed around the time of the 2026 Carnival.

== Release ==
The album was released on September 29, 2026, in digital format, and in November, on CD and vinyl, in a simultaneous release across Europe, Japan, the United States, and Brazil.

== Critical reception ==
On his blog on G1, journalist and music critic Mauro Ferreira gave the album three and a half stars on a scale of up to five. In his article, he stated that "Ed Motta sought to present a more laid-back album, and to a certain extent he succeeded when compared to his previous English-language albums; however, Ed Motta is not Liminha, the music producer of the aforementioned Manual prático para festas, bailes e afins, the 1997 album that became the commercial pop benchmark in the singer's discography."

== Track listing ==
No.	Title	Writer(s)	Length
1.	"Eu Quero Ser Feliz"	Ed Motta, Edna Lopes	3:30
2.	"O Desejo Está Nu"	Ed Motta, Edna Lopes	5:04
3.	"Toc-Toc"	Ed Motta, Edna Lopes	4:02
4.	"Glamour Hotel"	Ed Motta, Leoni	3:39
5.	"Casa de Frente Pro Mar"	Ed Motta, Edna Lopes	3:20
6.	"O Grande Plano"	Ed Motta, Edna Lopes	3:15
7.	"A Marina Acende"	Ed Motta, Edna Lopes	3:30
8.	"Beth"	Ed Motta, Edna Lopes	6:05
9.	"Não Tem Contradição"	Ed Motta, Edna Lopes	2:55
10.	"Um Dia de Sol"	Ed Motta, Edna Lopes	4:47
11.	"Voltei Pra Mim"	Ed Motta, Edna Lopes	4:22
Total length:			44:29
