= Dana Leong =

Background information
- Genres: Classical music, Jazz, Electronic
- Occupations: Musician, Composer, Producer
- Years active: 1996 - present
- Website: danaleong.com tektonikmusic.org

Dana Leong is a multi-instrumentalist, composer and producer from the San Francisco Bay Area. He is known for mixing elements of traditional instruments such as electric cello and trombone with electronic music and visuals.

== Early life ==
Leong's mother, the Japanese pianist Sumiko Nagasawa, gave piano lessons with the infant Dana sleeping in her lap. Leong's violin instructor Marjorie Lin found that Leong possessed perfect pitch when he would repeatedly ask her to tune his violin.

As a teen, he studied cello under Kathleen Johnson, Julian Hersh and Irene Sharp while also studying trombone under Paul Welcomer of the San Francisco Symphony, Wayne Wallace and Dr. Arthur Barnes and Fred Berry at Stanford University and David Taylor at the Manhattan School of Music. Leong later attended the Harvard Kennedy School of Government, where he studied public policy.

While in middle and high school, Leong was selected for principal positions playing both Cello & Trombone in the California All State Jazz and classical ensembles, the Monterey Jazz Festival All Star Big Band which toured Japan & California and the National Grammy High School All Star Big Band which performed at the 1997 & 1998 Grammy Awards Events with Boyz II Men and on NBC's nationally televised Today Show.

At the age of 16, Leong was invited to become the youngest professor of jazz at the Stanford University Summer Jazz Workshop where he still teaches students age 12-70 styles of jazz on the topics of creative improvisation and performance.

At the age of 17, Leong and the Grammy Ensemble also performed for the Presidential Summit for Anti-Violence at Philadelphia Constitution Hall, where Presidents Bill Clinton, George Bush Sr., Ronald Reagan, Jimmy Carter, Ford and Secretary General Colin Powell signed the country's first anti-gun act affecting schools nationwide.

== Career ==
After moving to New York, while studying Jazz Trombone and Orchestral Cello at the Manhattan School of Music on a full scholarship, he continued to perform and produce with many well known musicians from the Jazz, Latin and Hip-Hop worlds such as Marc Anthony, Huey Dunbar, Horace Silver, Ryuichi Sakamoto, DJ Qbert, DJ A-Trak, Chat Hugo, Harry Belafonte, Christian McBride, The Mingus Big Band, Wynton Marsalis & the Jazz at Lincoln Center Orchestra, Balkan Beat Box, Keali'i Reichel, Firewater, Chick Corea, Lila Downs, Lionel Hampton, Dave Douglas, David Taylor, Steve Coleman, Eddie Palmieri, Henry Threadgill, Claudia Acuña, Fermin Muguruza, Lew Soloff, Jason Lindner, Tony Escapa, Miguel Zenon, Dafnis Prieto, Yosvany Terry, Christian Howes and Paquito D'Rivera whom with Leong collaborated on the "Panamericana Suite" Album, which won two Grammy Awards for "Best Latin Jazz Album" and "Best Classical Composition" in 2011. Leong is a fan of hip-hop, jazz, electronic music and film score and continues to blend and bend genre lines with his own musical compositions.

He has also performed in stage productions by Sleep No More and FELA! on Broadway, Manila's GMA Christmas Show, PBS, Canal+ Live, FIP French National Radio, NPR as well as fashion events by Mercedes Benz Fashion Week, Diane Von Firstenberg & Alexandre Herchcovitch.

In 2005, Leong opened "Life After Dark Studio", a medium-sized production studio based in Harlem with satellite locations in Columbus, Ohio, and San Francisco. The studio was where Leong created 3 of his albums, "Leaving New York", "Anthems of Life" and "Dream State". The studio closed in 2016 to make bandwidth for Leong to work further with his social entrepreneurship platform TEKTONIK and open a new studio location in Shanghai, China.

During the 2007-2008 season, the Dana Leong Band was selected as the top recipient of the US State Department of Cultural Affairs's American Music Abroad music diplomacy program's US Ambassadorship."

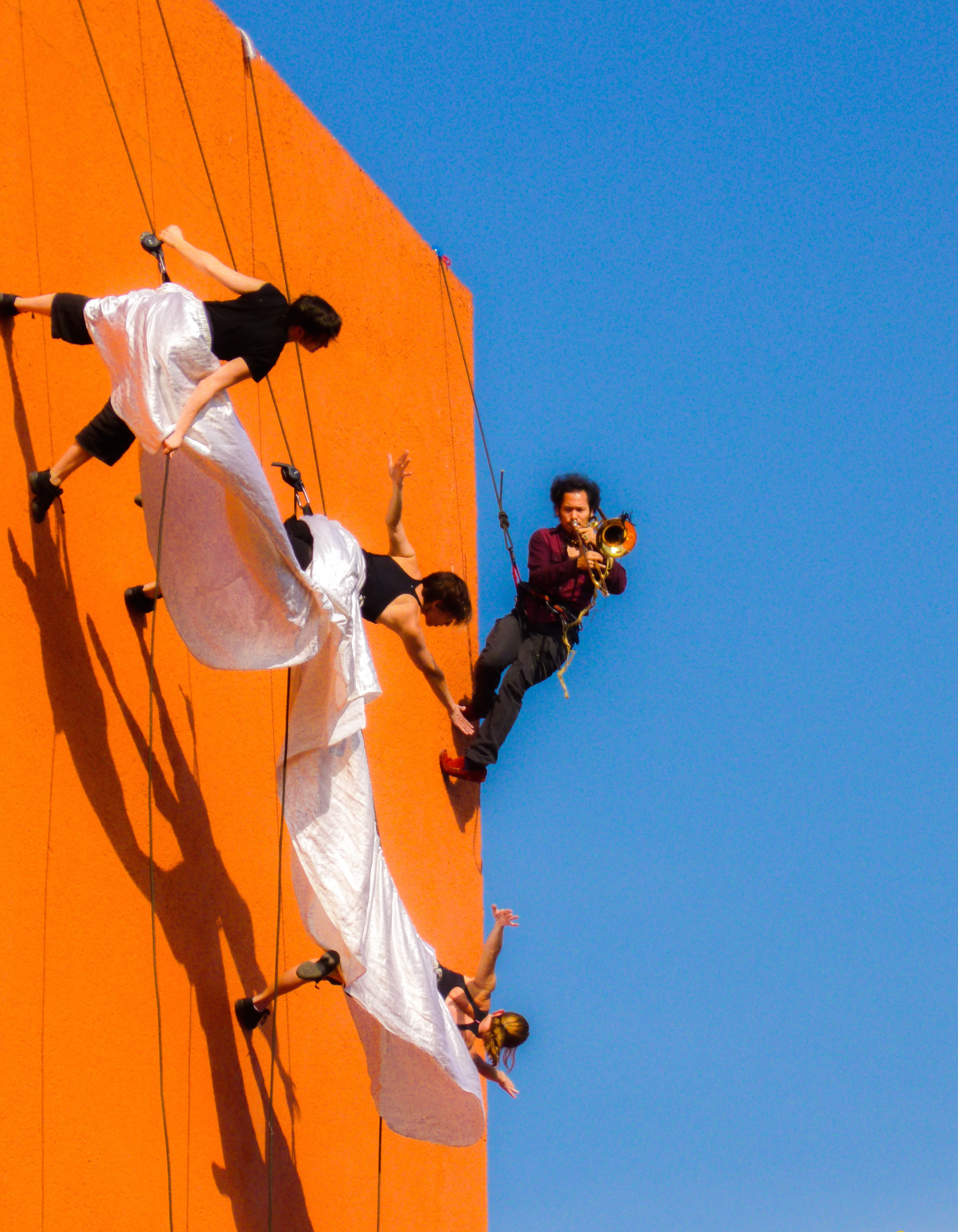
Dana Leong Aerial Performance at Cenart Mexico

In 2010, Leong began working with an aerial production company to create performances which included Leong playing his trombone and cello whilst suspended high in the air on the side of skyscrapers and towers. He performed off the walls of Los Angeles City Hall, The Old Post Office next to the White House and the Campeche Cathedral in Mexico. That year he also became composer in residence for the Museum of Chinese in America and volunteered with Midori Goto's Midori & Friends Foundation, helping craft and teach musical programs for inner city schools in the greater New York City Area.

In 2014, Leong was the first musician to bring Hip-Hop to the stage of the World Economic Forum's Summer Davos 'Meeting of New Champions' Conference in Tianjin China. He invited DJ Qbert to join him in performing and giving interactive lecture demonstrations on the history of Hip-Hop to show musical collaboration methods as examples for world leaders to follow. The conference was attended by Chinese Communist Party general secretary Xi Jinping, athlete Yao Ming, actress Yao Chen (Queen of Weibo) and 4 thousand influencers assembling to discuss solutions to global issues. Leong's duet with DJ Qbert later became a trio with painter TV host Justin Bua and the three co-created a short animated film with artist Julie Gratz entitled "Rhythm of the City" which won awards from film festivals including New York's Tribeca Film Festival.

The following winter of 2015 Leong was nominated and included into the World Economic Forum's Young Global Leader Community, a group of 1000 top global influencers under the age of 40 spanning arts culture, technology, finance, science, arts culture, government policy, social entrepreneurship and family business sectors. His participation allows him to give music a voice in global dialogs addressing social, economic and political issues. He joins fellow musicians Pharrell Williams, Will.I.Am, John Legend, Bono, and Michael Jackson alongside business leaders such as Jack Ma, Mark Zuckerberg, and Hugo Barra in a community geared towards activating positive global change.

== TEKTONIKmusic ==
In 2011, as a response to his family being affected by the tsunami, earthquake & nuclear disasters in Japan, Leong formed TEKTONIKmusic, an artist collective geared towards using music as a vehicle to remediate negative effects in natural disaster and trauma stricken zones of the world.

2015 & 2016 Leong presented his TEKTONIKmusic celebrating the Global Teacher Prize alongside Bill Clinton and Sunny Varkey. In 2016 TEKTONIKmusic opened a new operating arm in Shanghai, China. Shortly after, Leong and TEKTONIKmusic presented at TEDXShanghai, IPCN TV's Fashion Week, Shanghai Art Festival (together with visual artist Android Jones) and the 1st Alibaba Xin Philanthropy Conference alongside United Nations Secretary General Ban Ki-moon, Alibaba Founder Jack Ma, actor Jet Li and athlete Yao Ming. Leong & TEKTONIKmusic's performances, music videos, live streamed events have reached audiences topping 100 million. Leong is an advisory board member to The Wellbeing Project which creates wellness programs to promote smart and healthy ways to work.

Leong and TEKTONIKmusic have since given keynote performances and speeches at the United Nations, Save The Children's Children of Tomorrow Summit, TEDXShanghai, Summit Series, Womankind (NY Asian Women's Center) Harvard Kennedy School, The Li Ka Shing Foundation, "Tasteful Rhythms" at Four Seasons, Asian Institute of Management 50th Anniversary, H&Q Asia, AMTD-Lendit Fintech Technology Summit and was honored by UBS as 2017 Global Visionary for social entrepreneurship while invited to meet with Netherlands Prime Minister Mark Rutte.
