= Manual Prático para Festas, Bailes e Afins - Vol. 1 =

Manual Prático para Festas, Bailes e Afins – Vol. 1

Studio album by Ed Motta
- Released: 1997
- Genre: Jazz, soul, pop
- Length: 57:23
- Label: Universal Music
- Producer: Liminha

Ed Motta chronology
Entre e Ouça (1992)	Manual Prático para Festas, Bailes e Afins – Vol. 1 (1997)	Remixes & Aperitivos (1998)

Manual Prático para Festas, Bailes e Afins – Vol. 1 is an album by Brazilian musician Ed Motta, released in 1997 by Universal Music. Ed's fourth studio album blends the genres of jazz, soul, and pop.

== Background ==
The fourth studio album by composer and musician Ed Motta, Manual Prático para Festas, Bailes e Afins – Vol. 1, was released by Universal Music and produced by Liminha, an important producer of Brazilian rock bands in the 1980s. Five years after his last work, Entre e Ouça, Motta returned to the studio, now aged twenty-five, armed with an aesthetic inspired by the 1950s—which he claimed in an interview with the Folha de S.Paulo newspaper to be "the best decade in terms of graphic aesthetics."

In an interview with Rio de Janeiro newspaper Tribuna da Imprensa, he stated that he was "tired of hearing his fans ask 'when are you going to release a new CD?' or 'have you disappeared?' on the streets."

The album featured renowned musicians such as Marcelo Yuka, Ronaldo Bastos, Rita Lee, and Zélia Duncan, who contributed to the compositions.

== Track listing ==
No.	Title	Writer(s)	Length
1.	"Daqui Pro Méier"	Ed Motta, Chico Amaral	4:52
2.	"Vendaval"	Ed Motta, Ronaldo Bastos	4:02
3.	"Fora da Lei"	Ed Motta, Rita Lee	4:51
4.	"Lustres E Pingentes"	Ed Motta, Chico Amaral	3:44
5.	"Birinaite"	Ed Motta, Marcelo Yuka, Pedro Luís, Kassin	4:18
6.	"Por Você Ser Mais"	Ed Motta, Ronaldo Bastos	3:42
7.	"Como Dois Cristais"	Ed Motta, Ronaldo Bastos	4:01
8.	"A Flor do Querer"	Ed Motta, Ronaldo Bastos	2:47
9.	"Dias De Paz"	Ed Motta, Ronaldo Bastos	4:18
10.	"A Loja Do Subsolo" (Vinheta)	Ed Motta	1:33
11.	"Luna E Cera"	Ed Motta, Chico Amaral	5:01
12.	"Mentiras Fáceis"	Ed Motta, Zélia Duncan	2:31
13.	"Falso Milagre do Amor"	Ed Motta, Ronaldo Bastos	3:11
14.	"Quais Serão Meus Desejos?"	Ed Motta, Zélia Duncan	4:03
15.	"Cartão De Visita" (Vinheta)	Ed Motta	1:16
16.	"Falso Milagre do Amor" (Versão Metais Em Brasa)	Ed Motta, Ronaldo Bastos	3:13
Total length:			57:23

== Release ==
The album was released on CD by Universal in 1997. In Japan, the CD was released twice, in 1999 and 2021, both by Universal. Motta's album launch concert at SESC Interlagos, in the city of São Paulo, was broadcast by TVA, a TV station owned by Grupo Abril.

== Reception ==
=== Sales ===
The album is the most commercially successful of Motta's career, reaching the milestone of 300,000 records sold.

=== Critical ===
Rdorigo Fauor, writing for the newspaper Tribuna da Imprensa, gave it three stars out of five, praising the album and stating that "the singer does not seem to attach much importance to the meaning of the lyrics, focusing more on the sounds they produce." Silvio Essigner wrote in Jornal do Brasil that the album is a "good mix of original and commercial."

=== Prizes ===
The music video for Daqui pro Méier, directed by Breno Silveira and Dudu Miranda, was nominated for the 1998 MTV Video Music Brazil awards, organized by MTV Brasil, in the category of "Best Cinematography in a Video." At a ceremony held at the Anhembi Convention Center in São Paulo, hosted by Carlinhos Brown, Ed Motta's music video was defeated by Ela Disse Adeus by the band Os Paralamas do Sucesso.

Year	Prize	Category	Place	Recipition(s)	Result	Ref.
1998	MTV Video Music Brazil	Best Cinematography in a Video	Anhembi Convention Center, São Paulo, São Paulo, Brazil	Daqui pro Méier	Indicated	

== Legacy ==
The success of the first album led to a second installment in Ed's musical journey, As Segundas Intenções do Manual Prático, released in 2000.

In a poll of the 500 greatest Brazilian albums conducted by the Discoteca Básica podcast, which featured more than 160 music experts, the album was ranked in four hundred and twenty-first, also being the only album by Ed Motta mentioned on the list.

In 2025, Ed announced a tour to celebrate the album's 30th anniversary. The tour included concerts in São Paulo, Porto Alegre, Rio de Janeiro, Buenos Aires, and Santiago.

=== Soundtrack ===
The song Fora da Lei, a collaboration between Ed and Rita Lee, was featured on the soundtrack of the soap opera Por Amor by Manoel Carlos, broadcast by TV Globo, and was the theme song for the character Kátia, played by Giovanna Gold.
