= Sambolero =

Studio album by The João Donato Trio
- Released: December 31, 2005
- Recorded: 50:23
- Genre: Jazz
- Label: Universal

João Donato chronology
Managarroba (2004)	Sambolero (2005)

Sambolero is a studio album by The João Donato Trio released by Universal Music Group on December 31, 2005. The album earned the Latin Grammy for Best Latin Jazz Album at the 11th Latin Grammy Awards.

== Track listing ==
The track listing from Allmusic.

No.	Title	Length
1.	"Amazonas"	4:00
2.	"Quem Diz Que Sabe"	5:12
3.	"Surpresa"	5:29
4.	"Bananeira"	3:12
5.	"Brisa Do Mar"	5:00
6.	"Ê Menina"	3:11
7.	"Lugar Comun"	2:41
8.	"Sambolero"	5:03
9.	"A Rã"	6:47
10.	"Nasci Para Bailar"	2:28
11.	"Café Com Pão (Jodel)"	4:18
12.	"Sambou... Sambou" (featuring Zeca Pagodinho)	3:02
