= Panamericana Suite =

Live album by Paquito D'Rivera
- Released: November 2, 2010
- Recorded: April 2008
- Genre: Jazz
- Length: 68:34
- Label: MCG Jazz
- Producer: Jay Ashby, Marty Ashby

Paquito D'Rivera chronology
| Dia y Medio: A Day and a Half (2010) | Panamericana Suite (2010) | Paquito D'Rivera (2011) |

Panamericana Suite is a live album by Cuban jazz performer Paquito D'Rivera. It was released by MCG Jazz on November 2, 2010. The album was produced by Jay and Marty Ashby, and features eight songs performed with several guest performers such as Brenda Feliciano, Dave Samuels and Diego Urcola, among others. Recorded live at the Manchester Craftsmen's Guild in Pittsburgh, Pennsylvania, in April 2008, the album earned the Latin Grammy Award for Best Latin Jazz Album.

== Background and content ==
Paquito D'Rivera recorded the track "Panamericana" in 2000, and was first performed at the Jazz at Lincoln Center. The same year was included in the soundtrack album for the film Calle 54, directed by Fernando Trueba; the album received Grammy Award and Latin Grammy Award nominations. Panamericana Suite takes its name after the song and was recorded live at the Manchester Craftsmen's Guild in Pittsburgh, Pennsylvania in April 2008. About its content, D'Rivera stated: "I am an eclectic person.. I grew up the son of a classical saxophone player who loved jazz... growing up in Havana, Latin American music was in the air." The album includes "Waltz for Moe", a jazz waltz that includes elements of joropo, and was written as a tribute to Canadian performer Moe Koffman. "Con Alma" is a song written by Dizzy Gillespie, and arranged by Oscar Stagnaro, including the Peruvian rhythms festejo and zambo lando. "Preludio No. 3" is a tango and features Argentinean trumpeter Diego Urcola, mixing bandoneón, saxophone and trumpet. "Tojo" is a candombe written in honor to Cuban trombonist Generoso "El Tojo" Jiménez. The title track includes several musical styles such as milonga, danzón, bembé, cha cha chá, bossa nova, reggae and joropo. "Fiddle Dreams" is performed in the rhythm of classical, swing, and samba. "Serenade", written by Carlos Franzetti, balances danza and timba. Puerto-Rican soprano Brenda Feliciano joins "Song for Peace", a track with tango undertones.

== Accolades ==
Panamericana Suite earned the Latin Grammy for Best Latin Jazz Album at the 12th Latin Grammy Awards, and the title track received the Latin Grammy Award for Best Classical Contemporary Composition. Marty Ashby, the record producer, said about the awards outcome: "This recording expresses the essence of Paquito D’Rivera... from refined Classical compositions to swinging jazz, Paquito takes the listener on a journey celebrating the multitude of Latin and World rhythms, connecting them with the best of jazz and classical traditions."

== Track listing ==
The track listing from Allmusic. All tracks written and composed by Paquito D'Rivera, except "Con Alma" by Dizzy Gillespie, "Preludio No. 3" by Roberto Pansera and "Serenade" by Carlos Franzetti.

| No. | Title | Length |
|---|---|---|
| 1. | "Waltz for Moe" | 8:49 |
| 2. | "Con Alma" | 7:02 |
| 3. | "Preludio No. 3" | 5:48 |
| 4. | "Tojo" | 9:10 |
| 5. | "Panamericana Suite" | 11:16 |
| 6. | "Fiddle Dreams" | 10:58 |
| 7. | "Serenade" | 7:53 |
| 8. | "Song for Peace" | 7:38 |
| Total length: | | 68:34 |

== Personnel ==
- Paquito D'Rivera – main performer
- Pedro Martinez – batá, timbales, vocals
- Pernell Saturnino – percussion
- Oscar Stagnaro – bass guitar
- Mark Walker – drum set
- Alon Yavnai – piano
- Dana Leong – trombone, cello
- Hector del Curto – bandoneón
- Andy Narell – steelpan
- Dave Samuels – vibraphone, marimba
- Diego Urcola – trumpet
- Edmar Castaneda – harp
- Brenda Feliciano – vocals

Credits adapted from CD Universe.

== See also ==
- 2010 in Latin music
