= Síntese do Lance =

Studio album by João Donato and Jards Macalé
- Released: October 22, 2021
- Recorded: 2021
- Studios: Estúdio Rocinante, Araras, Petrópolis, Rio de Janeiro, Brazil
- Genres: MPB; samba-jazz
- Length: 30:31
- Label: Rocinante
- Producers: Sylvio Fraga; Pepê Monnerat; Marlon Sette

João Donato chronology
Donato Elétrico (2016)	Síntese do Lance (2021)	Serotonina (2023)

Jards Macalé chronology
Besta Fera (2019)	Síntese do Lance (2021)	Coração Bifurcado (2024)

Singles from Síntese do Lance
- 1. "Síntese do Lance" Released: September 17, 2021; 2. "Côco Táxi" Released: October 1, 2021

Síntese do Lance is an MPB album released on October 22, 2021, by Brazilian musicians João Donato and Jards Macalé on the Rocinante label. The album was nominated for a Latin Grammy for Best Brazilian Popular Music Album at the 2022 awards.

== Background ==
An album conceived by poet and composer Sylvio Fraga and produced by Fraga, Pepê Monnerat, and Marlon Sette, the meeting of musicians João Donato and Jards Macalé for the work Síntese do Lance took place in Araras, in the mountainous region of Rio de Janeiro, marking the first time that the musicians, who had been friends for a long time, had worked together.

The first single from the album was the song Síntese do Lance, released on September 17, 2022. Composed by Donato, the song has strong religious appeal, as it is inspired by the entity Zé Pilintra, who has a strong presence in Umbanda. To continue promoting the album, the duo released a second single, Cocô Táxi. The album features only previously unreleased songs.

On the album cover, the musicians appear naked. In an interview with Daniel Barbosa, from the Minas Gerais newspaper Estado de Minas, Jards said that the idea came from Donato's wife, and that while they were posing for the photos, Donato kept repeating “Awkward" in a joking tone.

== Track listing ==
Síntese do Lance track listing
No.	Title	Writer(s)	Length
1.	"Côco Táxi"	Jards Macalé, João Donato	3:30
2.	"Dona Castorina"	João Donato	3:50
3.	"Ontem E Hoje"	Jards Macalé, Sylvio Fraga	2:20
4.	"Cururu"	Sylvio Fraga, Marlon Sette	3:30
5.	"João Duke"	Jards Macalé	2:13
6.	"Síntese Do Lance"	Popular song (adapted by Marlon Sette and João Donato)	3:30
7.	"Açafrão"	João Donato, Marlon Sette, Sylvio Fraga	2:43
8.	"Um Abraço Do João"	Joyce Moreno, Jards Macalé	1:42
9.	"O Amor Vem Da Paz"	Ronaldo Bastos, Jards Macalé	3:35
10.	"Lídice"	Jards Macalé	3:00
Total length:			30:31

== Reception ==
=== Critical ===
Journalist and music critic Mauro Ferreira wrote in his blog on G1, rating the album three and a half stars out of five, praising the musicians' collaboration, but noting, “although Donato's piano and Macalé's guitar are together throughout the album, there was a lack of interaction between the two artists, including in the composition process." Julinho Bittencourt, writing for Fórum magazine, gave a positive review and noted that “the fact is that the album sounds more modern than ever by returning to the sound of the Bossa Nova era of the late 1950s and early 1960s, a movement of which Donato was a pioneer and Macalé a faithful follower.”

=== Accolades ===
The album was nominated for a Latin Grammy in 2022 in the Best Brazilian Popular Music Album category. At a ceremony held at the Mandalay Bay Events Center in Las Vegas, United States, the album ended the night nominated, after singer Liniker won the category with the album Indigo Borboleta Anil.

Year	Award	Category	Venue	Result	Ref.
2022	Latin Grammy Award	Best Portuguese Language Contemporary Pop Album	Mandalay Bay Events Center, Las Vegas, Nevada, United States	Indicated	

== Musicians ==
The following musicians worked on the album:

- Jards Macalé: vocals and guitar;
- João Donato: vocals and piano;
- Guto Wirtti: acoustic bass;
- José Arimatéa: trumpet;
- Kainã do Jêje: drums;
- Luizinho do Jêje: percussion;
- Marlon Sette: trombone;
- Neném da cuíca: percussion.
