= 1998 MTV Video Music Brazil =

Award ceremony

- Date: 13 August 1998
- Location: Anhembi Convention Center, São Paulo, São Paulo
- Country: Brazil
- Hosted by: Carlinhos Brown
- Most awards: Os Paralamas do Sucesso (5)

Television/radio coverage
- Network: MTV Brasil

The 1998 MTV Video Music Brazil was held on 13 August 1998, at the Anhembi Convention Center in São Paulo, honoring the best Brazilian music videos from June 1997 to June 1998. The ceremony was hosted by singer Carlinhos Brown.

== Winners and nominees ==
Winners are listed first and highlighted in bold.

Video of the Year	Viewer's Choice
**Os Paralamas do Sucesso – "Ela Disse Adeus"**; Caetano Veloso – "Não Enche"; Cidade Negra – "Realidade Virtual"; Racionais MC's – "Diário de um Detento"; Raimundos – "Andar na Pedra"	**Racionais MC's – "Diário de um Detento"**; Barão Vermelho – "Puro Êxtase"; Biquini Cavadão – "Janaína"; Charlie Brown Jr. – "Proibida pra Mim"; Cidade Negra – "Realidade Virtual"; Claudinho & Buchecha – "Quero te Encontrar"; Daúde – "Pata Pata"; Engenheiros do Hawaii – "A Montanha"; Fernanda Abreu – "Jack Soul Brasileiro"; Gabriel, o Pensador – "Cachimbo da Paz"; Ira! – "Eu Não Sei (Can't Explain)"; Jota Quest – "Onibusfobia"; Lulu Santos – "Hyperconectividade"; Maskavo Roots – "Djorous"; O Rappa – "Vapor Barato"; Os Paralamas do Sucesso – "Ela Disse Adeus"; Pato Fu – "Antes Que Seja Tarde"; Planet Hemp – "Adoled (The Ocean)"; Raimundos – "Andar na Pedra"; Soulfly – "Bleed"
Best New Artist	Best Pop Video
**Charlie Brown Jr. – "Proibida Pra Mim"**; Lenine – "Dois Olhos Negros"; Pedro Luís e a Parede – "Pena de Vida"; Thalma – "Eu Quero Tanta Coisa"; Zeca Baleiro – "Bandeira"	**Os Paralamas do Sucesso – "Ela Disse Adeus"**; Cidade Negra – "Realidade Virtual"; Ivo Meirelles and Funk'n'Lata – "O Coro Tá Comendo"; Gabriel, o Pensador – "Cachimbo da Paz"; Pato Fu – "Antes Que Seja Tarde"
Best MPB Video	Best Rock Video
**Caetano Veloso – "Não Enche"**; Daniela Mercury – "Feijão de Corda"; Lenine – "Dois Olhos Negros"; Só Pra Contrariar – "Minha Metade"; Zeca Baleiro – "Bandeira"	**Raimundos – "Andar na Pedra"**; Barão Vermelho – "Puro Êxtase"; Edgard Scandurra – "Tudo o Que Eu Quero"; Mundo Livre S/A – "Bolo de Ameixa"; Soulfly – "Bleed"
Best Rap Video	Best Demo Video
**Racionais MC's – "Diário de um Detento"**; Doctor MC's – "Tik Tak"; Pavilhão 9 – "Grito de Liberdade"; MC & DJ Deco – "Vamô Fala!"; Thaíde & DJ Hum – "Sr. Tempo Bom"	**Paulo Francis Vai Pro Céu – "Perdidos no Espaço"**; Cabeçudoss – "PNC (P**rrada Na Cabeça)"; Câmbio Negro – "Pega a Manha"; Personagens – "Próprio Palavreado"; Vulgue Tostoi – "Vapor Barato"
Best Direction in a Video	Best Art Direction in a Video
**Os Paralamas do Sucesso – "Ela Disse Adeus" (Directors: Andrucha Waddington, Breno Silveira and Toni Vanzollini)**; Caetano Veloso – "Não Enche" (Director: Monique Gardenberg); Cidade Negra – "Realidade Virtual" (Director: Oscar Rodrigues Alves); Pato Fu – "Antes Que Seja Tarde" (Director: Hugo Prata); Racionais MC's – "Diário de um Detento" (Directors: Mauricio Eça and Marcelo Corpani)	**Os Paralamas do Sucesso – "Ela Disse Adeus" (Art Director: Toni Vanzollini)**; Cidade Negra – "Realidade Virtual" (Art Directors: Marcos Sachs and Luciano Cury); Lenine – "Dois Olhos Negros" (Art Directors: Beto Grimaldi and Helena Pessoa); Lulu Santos – "Hyperconectividade" (Art Director: Toni Vanzollini); Pato Fu – "Antes Que Seja Tarde" (Art Director: Cláudia Briza)
Best Editing in a Video	Best Cinematography in a Video
**Lulu Santos – "Hyperconectividade" (Editor: Sérgio Mekler)**; AD – "AD#2" (Editor: Jarbas Agnelli); Chelpa Ferro – "Alerte Cabra da Peste" (Editor: Sérgio Mekler); Cidade Negra – "Realidade Virtual" (Editor: Oscar Rodrigues Alves); Os Paralamas do Sucesso – "Ela Disse Adeus" (Editors: Sérgio Mekler and Joana Ventura)	**Os Paralamas do Sucesso – "Ela Disse Adeus" (Director of Photography: Breno Silveira)**; Cidade Negra – "Realidade Virtual" (Director of Photography: Adriano Goldman); Ed Motta – "Daqui Pro Méier" (Directors of Photography: Breno Silveira and Dudu Miranda); Pato Fu – "Antes Que Seja Tarde" (Director of Photography: Adriano Goldman); Raimundos – "Andar na Pedra" (Directors of Photography: Breno Silveira and André Horta)
