= Manhattan Burn =

Studio album by Paquito D'Rivera
- Released: 1987
- Recorded: 1986
- Genre: Jazz, Latin jazz
- Label: Columbia
- Producer: Helen Keane, Paquito D'Rivera, Ron Saint Germain

Paquito D'Rivera chronology
A Tribute to Cal Tjader (1986)	Manhattan Burn (1987)	Celebration (1988)

Manhattan Burn is an album by the Cuban-American musician Paquito D'Rivera, released in 1987. He supported it with a North American tour.

== Production ==
Coproduced by Helen Keane and Ron Saint Germain, the album was recorded in September and October 1986. D'Rivera was backed by Claudio Roditi on trumpet, John Hicks on piano, Rufus Reid on bass, Fareed Haque on guitar, and George Coleman on tenor saxophone, among others. He played clarinet on "Paquito's Samba" and Antonio Lauro's "Two Venezuelan Waltzes". "Paquito" was written by Chick Corea; "Feelings of the Heart" was written by Benny Golson. "Guataca City (To David Amram)" is dedicated to David Amram. "A Lo Tristano" is a tribute to Lennie Tristano.

== Critical reception ==
Professional ratings
Review scores
Source	Rating
All Music Guide to Jazz	3/5 stars
Chicago Sun-Times	3/4 stars
The Encyclopedia of Popular Music	4/5 stars
MusicHound Jazz: The Essential Album Guide	3.5/5 stars
Omaha World-Herald	3.5/5 stars
The Rolling Stone Jazz & Blues Album Guide	3/5 stars
The Windsor Star	B

The Philadelphia Inquirer said that the album "combines jazz and salsa with the intensity of a rock beat". The Globe and Mail opined that "the pop/fusion is generic stuff, and D'Rivera sounds like just another rich-toned, swooning romantic in this context." The Windsor Star stated that "Latin rhythms are never far away—from the contemporary funk-fusion of the title to the lightly skipping 'Paquito's Samba'". The Omaha World-Herald concluded that it was D'Rivera's "best album to date".

== Track listing ==
No.	Title	Length
1.	"Manhattan Burn"
2.	"For Leny (Andrade)"
3.	"Guataca City (To David Amram)"
4.	"Paquito"
5.	"Paquito's Samba"
6.	"Feelings of the Heart"
7.	"Two Venezuelan Waltzes"
8.	"A Lo Tristano"
9.	"All the Things You Are"
