= Live at the Blue Note (Paquito D'Rivera Quintet album) =

Live album by Paquito D'Rivera Quintet
- Released: April 18, 2000
- Genre: Cuban jazz
- Length: 51:27
- Label: Half Note
- Producer: Jack Kreisberg

Paquito D'Rivera chronology
Tropicana Nights (1999)	Live at the Blue Note (2000)	Habanera (2001)

Live at the Blue Note is the title of a live album released by the Cuban jazz ensemble Paquito D'Rivera Quintet (Paquito D'Rivera, Dari Eskenazi, Diego Urcola, and Mark Walker) on April 18, 2000. The album earned the Latin Grammy Award for Best Latin Jazz Album in 2001.

== Track listing ==
The track listing from Allmusic.

No.	Title	Writer(s)	Length
1.	"Curumim"	César Camargo Mariano	8:51
2.	"Welcome (Dialogue)"	Paquito D'Rivera	1:11
3.	"El Cura"	D'Rivera	8:49
4.	"Buenos Aires"	Diego Urcola	9:26
5.	"Tobago"	Dario Eskenazi	9:15
6.	"Como Un Bolero"	D'Rivera	5:45
7.	"Centro Havana Intro (Dialogue)"	D'Rivera	0:57
8.	"Centro Havana"	D'Rivera	4:43
9.	"Estamos Aí"	Mauricio Einhorn	2:30

== Credits ==
- Paquito d'Rivera - Clarinet, Composer, Primary Artist, Sax (Alto), Sax (Soprano)
- Maurício Einhorn - Composer
- Dario Eskenazi - Composer, Piano
- Lou Gimenez - Sound Editing
- Jack Kreisberg - Producer
- Oriente Lopez - Composer, Flute
- César Camargo Mariano - Composer
- Steve Remote - Recording Engineer, Mixing Engineer
- Pernell Saturnino - Percussion
- Oscar Stagnaro - Bass
- Diego Urcola - Composer, Trumpet
- Mark Walker - Drums
