= Aystelum =

Studio album by Ed Motta
- Released: 2005
- Genres: Jazz; Funk; Soul
- Length: 44:48
- Label: Trama
- Producers: André Szajman; Cláudio Szajman; João Marcello Bôscoli

Ed Motta chronology
Dwitza (2002)	Aystelum (2005)	Perfil (2005)

Aystelum is the eighth album by Brazilian musician Ed Motta, released by Trama in 2005. The album was nominated for the 7th Latin Grammy Awards.

== Release ==
The album was released in 2005 on CD in Brazil, Argentina, the United Kingdom, and Japan.

== Background ==
Aystelum is the eighth musical work by Brazilian artist Ed Motta. After his last work with the Universal Music Group record label Dwitza, Ed Motta signed a contract with Trama, marking his second work with the label, the album was produced by André Szajman, Cláudio Szajman, and João Marcello Bôscoli.

The work, which blends elements of jazz with funk and soul, featured compositions by Motta, with contributions from artists such as Nei Lopes and Claúdio Botelho, as well as the presence of samba singer Alcione on the track Samba Azul.

== Reception ==
Aystelum was well received by critics. Luiz Chagas, writing for Istoé magazine, praised the album, saying, "Eduardinho shows what he's made of. Punctuated by vintage instruments and the rhythmic presence of Laudir de Oliveira and Tutty Moreno, the album excels in good taste, starting with the cover, inspired by Hergé's Tintin comics and the work of Moebius.

The Folha de S. Paulo newspaper also praised the album, stating that "this time he went a little further, lightly flirting with the cacophonies of avant-garde jazz in some tracks on Aystelum [...] Unafraid to take risks, Ed Motta knows that a true artist does not just offer what his audience expects." The newspaper O Estado de S.Paulo praised the album, saying, "Aystelum has some of the best samba in its repertoire and a suite of Broadway-style musicals. The result reflects the personal taste of the singer and composer, who draws on influences from great jazz musicians and uses them to create one of his best albums."

Carlos Callado reported in Folha de S. Paulo that Gilles Peterson played the track Balendoah on his BBC Radio 1 radio show. John Walter, writing for the British newspaper The Guardian, gave it four stars out of five, praising the album and stating, "each track on Aystelum creates a different mood; each is worthy of close study, but the album rolls by is easily as the smoothest 'funky Bazilian love affair' compilation." The British newspaper The Independent gave the album five stars, stating: "This extraordinary album ranges from acoustic jazz with brass, dark ballads, and the crazy musical comedy/light opera of 'The Musical Medley' (most of which may be lost in translation), before returning to the funky jazz samba that he does best."

== Track listing ==
Aystelum
No.	Title	Writer(s)	Additional performer	Length
1.	"Awunism"	Ed Motta		5:37
2.	"Pharmácias"	Ed Motta, Nei Lopes		3:17
3.	"Aystelum"	Ed Motta		6:48
4.	"É Muita Gig Véi!!!"	Ed Motta		3:53
5.	"Samba Azul"	Ed Motta, Nei Lopes	Alcione	4:49
6.	"Balendoah"	Ed Motta		4:19
7.	"Abertura"	Ed Motta, Cláudio Botelho		1:33
8.	"Na Rua"	Ed Motta, Cláudio Botelho		2:06
9.	"Canção Em Torno Dele"	Ed Motta, Cláudio Botelho		1:54
10.	"A Charada"	Ed Motta, Ronaldo Bastos		4:00
11.	"Patidid"	Ed Motta		2:26
12.	"Guezagui"	Ed Motta		3:50
Total length:				44:48

=== Tour ===
The album tour included cities such as Rio de Janeiro and São Paulo.

== Accolades ==
The album was nominated for a Latin Grammy in 2006 in the category of "Best Latin Jazz Album." At a ceremony held at Madison Square Garden in New York City, the album ended the night nominated after Cuban jazz musician Gonzalo Rubalcaba won the category with his work Solo.

Year	Prize	Local	Category	Result	Ref.
2006	Latin Grammy Awards	Madison Square Garden, New York City, New York, United States	Latin Grammy Award for Best Latin Jazz/Jazz Album	Indicated	

== Musicians ==
The following musicians and artists worked on these albums:

- Laudir de Oliveira: Percussion, Congas;
- Renato Massa (Renato Calmon): Gong, Drums, Cymbals;
- Rafael Vernet: Piano, Clavinet Hohner D6, Arp String Ensemble, Teclados Elka Rhapsody 490 String, Multivox MX 20 Electronic, Celesta
- Ed Motta: Piano Fender Rhodes, Percussion, Voice, Clavinet Hohner D6 with Mu-Tron Bi-Phase, Piano RMI 368X with Wah-Wah, Agogô, Voices, Teclados Elka Rhapsody 490 String, Guitar;
- Jessé Sadoc do Nascimento Filho: Trumpet, Flugelhorn, Trombone;
- Alberto Continentino: Bass;
- André Perez: Tenor Saxophone;
- Armando Marçal (Marçalzinho): Percussion, Cuíca, Tamborim, Surdo, Garrafa;
- Paulinho Guitarra (Paulo Ricardo R. Alves): Guitars, Semi-Acoustic Guitar;
- Marcelinho Moreira: Cymbals, Caixa de Fósforos;
- Alcione: Voice;
- Eliezer Rodrigues: Tuba;
- Cristiano Alves: Clarone;
- Ricardo Amado: Violin;
- Jaques Morelenbaum: Cello;
- Pedro Sá: Cymbals, Wooden Blocks, Xylophone, Timpani;
- Daniel Guedes: Violin;
- Aldivas Ayres: Bombardino;
- José Ricardo Volker Taboada: Viola;
- Aloysio Fagerlande: Bassoon;
- Mariana Isdebsky Salles: Violin;
- Suely Franco: Voice;
- Marya Bravo: Voice;
- Alessandra Verney: Voice;
- Marco Antônio Monteiro: Harp;
- Glauco Baptista: Celesta;
- Ricca Barros: Voice;
- Cristiano Gualda: Voice;
- Gottsha: Voice;
- Philip Doyle: French Horn;
- Ricardo Rossi Santoro: Cello;
- Jesuína Noronha Passaroto: Viola;
- Michel Bessler: Violin;
- Paschoal Perrota: Violin;
- Carlos Eduardo Hack: Violin;
- José Rogério Rosa: Violin;
- Jairo Diniz Silva: Viola;
- Walter Hack: Violin;
- Marie Christine Springuel: Viola;
- Jorge Kundert Ranevsky (Iura): Cello;
- Celso Woltzenlogel: Flute;
- Marcus Ribeiro Oliveira: Cello;
- Antonella Lima Pareschi: Violin;
- Carmelita Reis de Souza: Violin;
- Bernardo Bessler: Violin;
- João Daltro de Almeida: Violin;
- Franklin Corrêa da Silva (Franklin da Flauta): Flute;
- José Alves da Silva: Violin;
- Edna Lopes: artwork.
