= Jessica Medina =

American singer-songwriter

- Born: Jessica Medina
- Genres: Jazz, Salsa, World music
- Occupations: Singer, songwriter
- Instrument: Vocals
- Years active: 2000–present
- Label: Independent
- Website: http://www.jessicamedina.com/

Jessica Medina is an American singer-songwriter of Dominican and Puerto Rican heritage, who performs mainly in the genres of jazz and Latin music. She has been reviewed by NPR as a "super talented vocalist that effortlessly bridges jazz, soul and even bits of afro caribbean music." She has released two albums: the first of jazz, the second with a little more fusion between jazz and Latin rhythms with more acoustic instrumentation.

She has been selected for Hennessy XO Jazz Tour Asia 2007. Her music is usually focused on social issues and female empowerment. She has collaborated with artists such as Jorge Glem, Luisito Quintero, Mireya Ramos (Flor de Toloache), Dkano and the producer Janina Rosado. She cameos in 2026 film Mexicali as a store owner.

== Musical career ==
She grew up in New York City with a Dominican mother and a Puerto Rican father, both of whom sang at home.

With Spanish and English as her native languages in New York City, she had a keen interest in culture, language, and the performing arts. She made summer trips to her grandparents' house in the Dominican Republic. At Hunter College she auditioned for a jazz performance class. She moved to Paris in 2002, and spent more than two years performing in the city with musicians and artists from a variety of genres.

In May 2007, she released her first full-length CD titled "Azul", featuring songs in four languages and talents such as Brazilian jazz trumpeter Claudio Roditi. She received featured artist status for the Hennessy X.O Jazz Smooth and Mellow Tour that same year, and toured China, Malaysia, and Taiwan. Upon her return, she continued to perform locally and made a new tour of South America, including stops in Buenos Aires, Rio de Janeiro and Lima.

As she developed her immersion in Afro-Peruvian music and salsa, for the next four years, her motherhood had a profound effect on her. She took up community work and local activism, which led her to record a second album titled "Black" and released in 2019, combining a World Music vibe with Afro-Peruvian and Caribbean influences. Her intention with the lyrics and music is to express pride in her Latino origins. The project led her to write original songs for the first time. Having grown up speaking Spanish, she channels her emotions into that language.

In 2020, Medina Medina was part of various events in New York, such as the "Jefas" concert with Renee Goust and Mai Elka at Joe's Pub, which was an event with all tickets sold, for the celebration of International Women's Day. Also, presented a composition with a tropical rhythm titled "Sueño, Te Extraño", that accompanies a message dedicated to mothers who have been forced to work from home due to quarantine while helping their children with virtual classes and trying to maintain mental health in their homes. She also covered the Juan Luis Guerra song "Si tu te vas" in a bilingual version, together with the Venezuelan musician Jorge Glem. In 2021, Medina paid tribute to Tex-Mex singer Selena Quintanilla, with a single that covers three of Selena's greatest hits, “Como la flor / Amor prohibido / Bidi bidi bom bom”.

== Personal life ==
Jessica is a graduate of Political Science (Human Rights) and Jazz Performance from Hunter College University in New York City. She has 2 children and currently lives in NY.

== Discography ==
- 2007: Azul
- 2019: Black
