= Tropicana Nights =

Studio album by Paquito D'Rivera
- Released: September 28, 1999
- Genre: Cuban jazz
- Length: 45:35
- Label: Chesky

Paquito D'Rivera chronology
La Habana: Rio Conexion (1992)	Tropicana Nights (1999)	Live at the Blue Note (2000)

Tropicana Nights is a studio album released by the Cuban jazz performer Paquito D'Rivera on November 11, 2008. The album earned D'Rivera the Latin Grammy Award for Best Latin Jazz Album in 2000.

== Track listing ==
The track listing from Allmusic.

No.	Title	Writer(s)	Length
1.	"Mambo a la Kenton"	Armando Romeu	3:58
2.	"Chucho"	Paquito D'Rivera	3:34
3.	"Cicuta Tibia"	Ernesto Duarte	4:57
4.	"Siboney"	Ernesto Lecuona	6:31
5.	"Old Miami Sax"	Juanito Marquez	4:21
6.	"Tropicana Nights"	D'Rivera	5:29
7.	"Sustancia"	Duarte	3:45
8.	"Cómo Fué"	Duarte	5:48
9.	"El Coronel y Marina"	Chico O'Farrill	3:02
10.	"Mambo Inn"	Mario Bauzá, Edgar Sampson, Grace Simpson, Bobby Woodlen	4:08
11.	"A Mi Qué / El Manisero (The Peanut Vendor)"	Moisés Simons, Marion Sunshine	3:59

== Personnel ==
- Trumpet - Adalberto Oré Lara
- Photography - Alan Nahigian
- Art Direction - Aldo Sampieri
- Trumpet - Alejandro Odio
- Tenor Saxophone - Andres Boiarsky
- Arranger, Composer - Armando Romeu
- Engineer - Barry Wolifson
- Composer - Bobby Woodlen
- Choir/Chorus, Vocals - Brenda Feliciano
- Production Assistant - Catherine Kernen
- Arranger, Composer - Chico O'Farrill
- Arranger, Piano - Dario Eskenazi
- Producer - David Chesky
- Arranger, Choir/Chorus, Guitar - David Oquendo
- Assistant Engineer - David Windmuller
- Trumpet - Diego Urcola
- Composer - Edgar Sampson
- Arranger, Composer - Ernesto Duarte
- Composer - Ernesto Lecuona
- Technical Consultant - George Kaye
- Composer - Grace Sampson
- Trumpet - Gustavo Bergalli
- Guest Artist, Trombone - Jimmy Bosch
- Bongos - Joe Gonzalez
- Bass - Joe Santiago
- Composer - Juanito Márquez
- Production Assistant - Lisa Hershfield
- Project Director - Lisa J. Marks
- Vocals - Lucrecia
- Trombone - Luis Bonilla
- Alto Saxophone - Manuel Valera
- Composer - Mario Bauzá
- Composer - Marion Sunshine
- Drums - Mark Walker
- Baritone Saxophone - Marshall McDonald
- Trumpet - Mike Ponella
- Congas, Guest Artist - Milton Cardona
- Composer - Moisés Simóns
- Editing, Mastering - Nick Prout
- Trombone - Noah Bless
- Executive Producer - Norman Chesky
- Choir/Chorus, Piano - Oriente Lopez
- Guest Artist, Tenor Saxophone - Oscar Feldman
- Arranger, Choir/Chorus, Clarinet, Composer, Linear Notes, Primary Artist, Producer, Alto Saxophone, Soprano Saxophone - Paquito D'Rivera
- Timbales - Ralph Irizarry
- Music Coordinator, Transcription - Ray Santos
- Assistant Engineer - Rick Eckerle
- Engineer, Production Coordination - Sandy Palmer Grassi
- Assistant Producer - Steve Guttenberg
- Guest Artist, Trombone - William Cepeda
