= Funk Tango =

Album by Paquito D'Rivera

Studio album by Paquito D'Rivera Quintet?
- Released: 2007
- Label: Sunny Side Records

Funk Tango is an album by the Paquito D'Rivera Quintet?, released through Sunny Side Records in 2007. In 2008, the album won the group the Grammy Award for Best Latin Jazz Album.

== Track listing ==
1. "Pere" (Ed Simon) – 6:35
2. "What About That!" (Mark Walker) – 6:56
3. "Revirado" (Astor Piazzolla) – 5:36
4. "Contradanza" (Paquito D'Rivera) – 3:05
5. "Milonga 10" (Fernando Otero) – 5:17
6. "Final Waltz" (Diego Urcola) – 5:27
7. "Funk Tango" (Alon Yavnai) – 7:09
8. "Mariela's Dream" (Alain Mallet, Oscar Stagnaro) – 6:48
9. "La Yumba-Caravan" (Osvaldo Pugliese, Juan Tizol) – 8:01
10. "Como un Bolero" (Paquito D'Rivera) – 4:49
11. "Giant Steps" (John Coltrane) – 5:50
