= Claudio Roditi =

Brazilian jazz trumpeter (1946–2020)

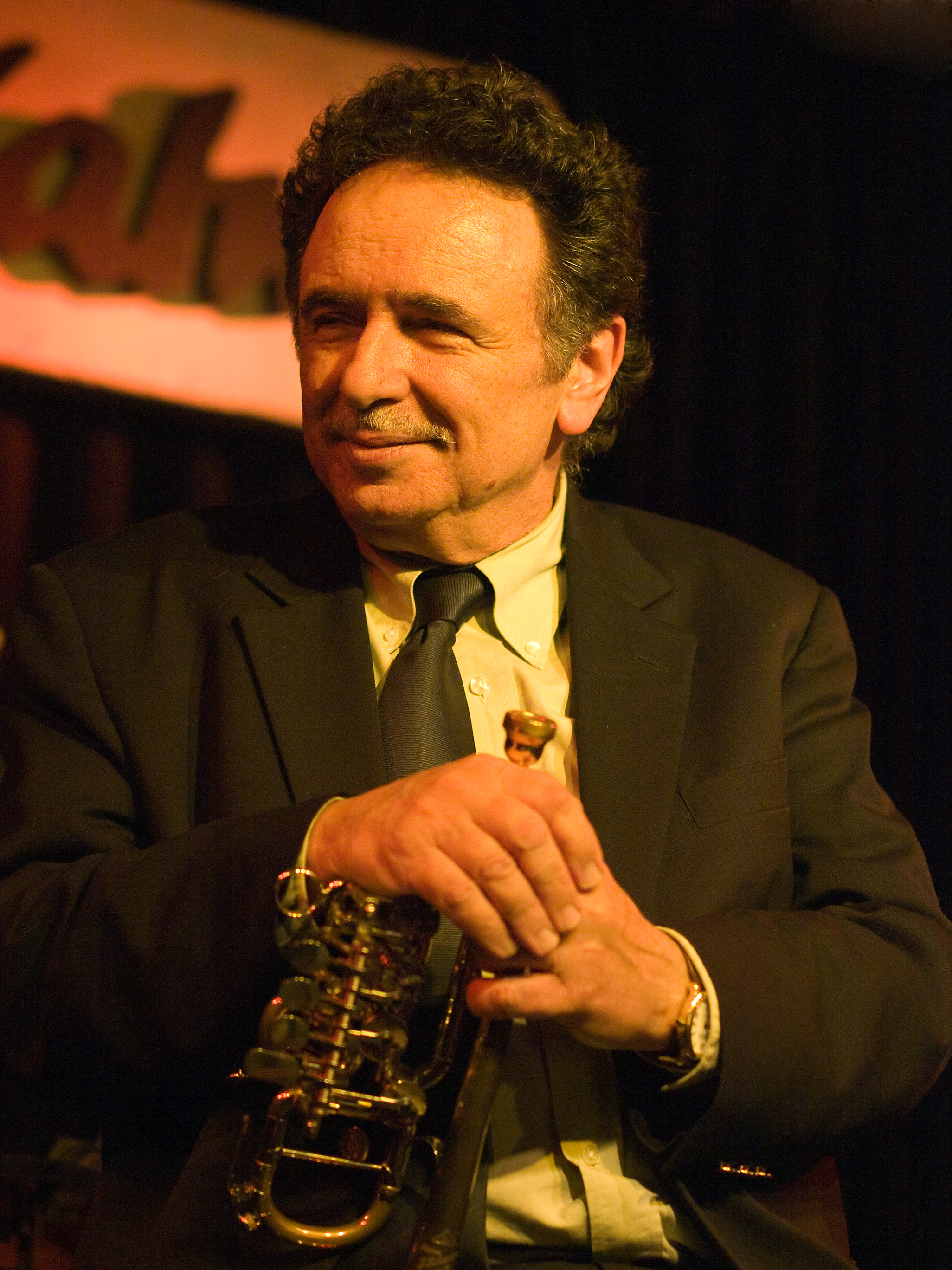
- Claudio Roditi, 2010

Background information
- Born: May 28, 1946; Rio de Janeiro, Brazil
- Died: January 17, 2020 (aged 73) South Orange, New Jersey, U.S.
- Genres: Jazz, Brazilian jazz
- Occupation: Musician
- Instrument: Trumpet
- Years active: 1970–2019
- Labels: Greene Street, Uptown, Milestone, Candid, CTI, Reservoir, Nagel-Heyer, Resonance

Claudio Roditi (May 28, 1946 – January 17, 2020) was a Brazilian jazz trumpeter. In 1966 Claudio was named a trumpet finalist at the International Jazz Competition in Vienna, Austria. While in Vienna, Roditi met Art Farmer, one of his idols, and the friendship inspired the younger trumpeter to follow a career in jazz.

== Biography ==
Roditi came to the United States in 1970 to study at the Berklee School of Music in Boston. In 1976 he moved to New York City, where he played with Herbie Mann and Charlie Rouse. In the 1980s he worked with Paquito D'Rivera. He was a member of Dizzy Gillespie's United Nations Orchestra.

Roditi received a 52nd Annual Grammy Awards (2009) nomination in the category Best Latin Jazz Album for Brazillance X 4. He was also the featured soloist on Atras Da Porta from Symphonic Bossa Nova (Ettore Stratta conducting the Royal Philharmonic Orchestra), for which Jorge Calandrelli received an arranger nomination at the 38th Annual Grammy Awards (1995).

His first album as a leader, Red On Red was released in 1984 on Creed Taylor's Greene Street label, an imprint of CTI Records.

Roditi often performed on the rotary valve trumpet. He died of cancer in 2020 at the age of 73.

== Discography ==
=== As leader ===
- Red on Red (Greene Street; CTI Records 1984)
- Claudio! (Uptown, 1985)
- Gemini Man (Milestone, 1988)
- Slow Fire (Milestone, 1989)
- Two of Swords (Candid, 1991)
- Milestones (Candid, 1992)
- Day Waves (JSR, 1992)
- Jazz Turns Samba (Groovin' High, 1994)
- Free Wheelin (Reservoir, 1994)
- Samba Manhattan Style (Reservoir, 1995)
- Mind Games – Live (GLM Musikverlag, 1996)
- Claudio, Rio & Friends (Groovin' High, 1996)
- Claudio Roditi and the Metropole Orchestra (Mons, 1996)
- Double Standards (Reservoir, 1997)
- Light in the Dark (Nagel Heyer, 2004)
- Impressions (Groovin' High, 2006)
- Brazilliance (Resonance, 2009)
- Simpatico (Resonance, 2010)
- Bons Amigos (Resonance, 2011)

With Klaus Ignatzek, Jean-Louis Rassinfosse

- Three for One (Nagel Heyer, 2002)
- Light in the Dark (Nagel Heyer, 2004)
- Smile (Nagel Heyer, 2005)
- Reflections (Nagel Heyer, 2005)
- Beyond Question (Nagel Heyer, 2009)
- For a Long Time (HGBS, 2014)

=== As sideman ===
With Greg Abate

- Straight Ahead (Candid, 1993)
- Bop Lives! (Blue Chip, 1996)
- Horace Is Here (Koko, 2005)

With Michael Carvin

- First Time (Muse, 1988)
- Between Me and You (Muse, 1989)
- Each One Teach One (Muse, 1994)

With Chris Connor

- Classic (Contemporary, 1987)
- New Again (Contemporary, 1988)

With Dizzy Gillespie

- Live at the Royal Festival Hall (Enja, 1990)
- To Diz with Love (Telarc, 1992)

With Klaus Ignatzek

- Don't Stop It! (Timeless, 1987)
- Jacaranda (Timeless, 1988)
- New Surprise (Timeless, 1989)
- Eight Languages (1989)
- The Answer! (Candid, 1993)
- Silent Horns (Candid, 1995)
- Live (Acoustic Music, 1996)
- African Flower (Acoustic Music, 1997)
- Today Is Tomorrow (Nabel, 2002)

With Herbie Mann

- Sunbelt (Atlantic, 1978)
- Mellow (Atlantic, 1981)
- Jasil Brazz (RBI, 1987)
- 65th Birthday Celebration (Lightyear 1997)

With Mark Murphy

- Night Mood (Milestone, 1986)
- I'll Close My Eyes (Muse, 1994)

With Paquito D'Rivera

- Live at Keystone Korner (Columbia, 1983)
- Why Not! (Columbia, 1984)
- Explosion (Columbia, 1986)
- Manhattan Burn (Columbia, 1987)
- Celebration (CBS, 1988)
- Return to Ipanema (Town Crier, 1989)
- Who's Smoking?! (Candid, 1992)
- La Habana-Rio-Conexion (Messidor, 1992)
- A Night in Englewood (1994)
- Brazilian Dreams (2002)

With Charlie Rouse

- Cinnamon Flower (Douglas, 1977)
- Soul Mates (Uptown, 1993)

With David Schnitter

- Goliath (Muse, 1978)
- Glowing (Muse, 1981)

With McCoy Tyner

- Double Exposure (LRC, 1991)
- Blue Bossa (LRC, 1991)
- Autumn Mood (1997)
- McCoy Tyner and the Latin All-Stars (Telarc, 1999)
- Afro Blue (2007)

With others

- Kenny Barron, Kenny Barron & the Brazilian Knights (EmArcy, 2013)
- Ricky Ford, Hot Brass (Candid, 1992)
- Michael Franks, Tiger in the Rain (Warner Bros., 1979)
- Jimmy Heath, Little Man Big Band (Verve, 1992)
- Buddy Montgomery, Ties of Love (Landmark, 1987)
- Horace Silver, The Hardbop Grandpop (Impulse!, 1996)
- Flavio Chamis, Especiaria (Biscoito Fino, 2007)
- Jessica Medina, Azul (Jessica Medina, 2007)
