= João Donato =

Brazilian jazz and bossa nova pianist (1934–2023)

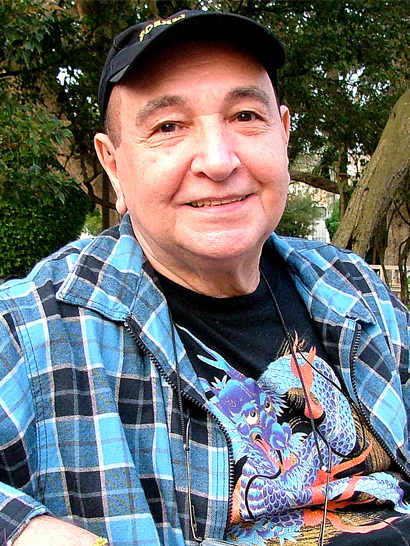
- Donato in 2007

Background information
- Born: João Donato de Oliveira Neto; 17 August 1934; Rio Branco, Acre, Brazil
- Died: 17 July 2023 (aged 88) Rio de Janeiro, Brazil
- Genres: Brazilian jazz; bossa nova
- Occupation: Musician
- Instruments: Piano; trombone
- Years active: 1940s–2023

João Donato de Oliveira Neto (Brazilian Portuguese: [ʒuˈɐ̃w doˈnatu]; 17 August 1934 – 17 July 2023) was a Brazilian jazz and bossa nova pianist as well as a trombonist from Rio Branco. He first worked with Altamiro Carrilho and went on to perform with Antonio Carlos Jobim and Astrud Gilberto. Because of the area he grew up in Brasil he was able to hear Cuban music on the radio. This influence would manifest itself in many of his compositions, piano, and trombone playing. Donato's most well-known compositions include: "Amazonas", "Lugar Comum", "Simples Carinho", "Até Quem Sabe" and "Nasci Para Bailar".

== Career ==
A professional at the age of 15, Donato played accordion at the Sinatra-Farney Fan Club. He would later learn piano and trombone.

Donato recorded for the first time with Altamiro Carrilho. Soon after he joined a band led by violinist Fafá Lemos that played in Brazilian nightclubs. His first solo recording came out in 1953. He led the bossa nova band Os Namorados which performed songs such as "Tenderly".

Donato became arranger and pianist for the band Garotos da Lua and was joined by João Gilberto. After moving to São Paulo, he played in the Luís César Orchestra and the band Os Copacabanas. In 1956 he recorded an album for Odeon that was produced by Antonio Carlos Jobim. Donato wrote "Minha Saudade" with Gilberto, and it became a hit. In an interview during the 1970s, Gilberto said Donato inspired the creation of bossa nova. His other most well known composition is "Amazonas" written by João in collaboration with Lysias Enio. It was first released by Nara Leão featuring João Donato in 1977. Other well-known compositions include "Lugar Comum", "Simples Carinho", "Até Quem Sabe" and "Nasci Para Bailar". "Simples Carinho" was written by Donato in collaboration with Abel Silva and recorded by artists including Simone, Gal Costa, and Angela Ro Ro who made it the title of her album of the same name, among others. Gal Costa's interpretation of "Simples Carinho" appears in the soap opera "Final Feliz".

A little known fact is that João played trombone and recorded on the instrument with the bands of legendary Latin bandleaders: pianist Eddie Palmieri (La Perfecta c. 1962) and master timbalero Tito Puente and his big band (Bossa Nova by Tito Puente c. 1962, Vaya Puente c. 1962).

Jobs at nightclubs decreased when customers said they couldn't dance to his music. Musicians, too, found the music difficult to learn. Unable to find work in his home country, he left Brazil after his friend Nanai, a former member of Os Namorados, offered him a job in the U.S. During the next decade, he recorded with Mongo Santamaria as a pianist, Tito Puente as a trombonist, Eddie Palmieri as a trombonist, Astrud Gilberto, Bud Shank, and Cal Tjader. His hits included "A Rã" and "Caranguejo", both recorded by Sergio Mendes and the aforementioned "Amazonas" which was also recorded by Tjader, and a new big band version by the Bobby Sanabria Multiverse Big Band on the Vox Humana album featuring Janis Siegel on vocals (2023). His album A Bad Donato (1970) was recorded with jazz bassist Ron Carter. He was music director for Gal Costa in 1974.

== Death ==
Donato died in Rio de Janeiro on 17 July 2023, at the age of 88.

== Awards and honors ==
Alexandre Carvalho dos Santos wrote, "I recommend a João Donato gig not only to someone who is interested in first-class music, an impressive pianist and a selection of historic compositions. I recommend it to anyone who needs an anti-depressive, an acupuncture session or any other form of deep relaxation. I had my dose on a Sunday evening, from a show in São Paulo. Perfect timing to start a week believing that happiness exists, in spite of your boss". In 2010, Sambolero, credited to the João Donato Trio, earned the Latin Grammy for Best Latin Jazz Album at the 10th Latin Grammy Awards. In the same year, he was one of the recipients of the Latin Grammy Lifetime Achievement Award.

In 2016, he was nominated for the Latin Grammy Award for Best Instrumental Album for his album Donato Elétrico. The album was also chosen by the Brazilian edition of Rolling Stone magazine as the 11th best Brazilian album of 2016. His album Sintetizamor was named by Rolling Stone Brasil one of the best of 2017.

== Discography ==
=== As leader ===
- A Bossa Muito Moderna De Donato E Seu Trio (Polydor, 1963)
- The New Sound of Brazil (RCA Victor, 1965)
- Sambou Sambou (Pacific Jazz, 1965)
- A Bad Donato (Blue Thumb, 1970)
- Quem e Quem (Odeon, 1973)
- DonatoDeodato (Muse, 1973)
- Lugar Comum (Philips, 1975)
- Leilíadas (Elektra Musician, 1986)
- Coisas tão simples (Odeon, 1995)
- Café com Pão with Eloir de Moraes (Lumiar Discos, 1997)
- Só Danço Samba (Lumiar Discos, 1999)
- Remando Na Raia (Lumiar Discos, 2001)
- Ê Lalá Lay-Ê (DeckDisc, 2001)
- Managarroba (Deckdisc, 2002)
- Wanda Sá Com João Donato (Deckdisc, 2003)
- A Blue Donato (Whatmusic, 2005)
- João Donato Reecontra Maria Tita (Lumiar Discos, 2006)
- Dois Panos para Manga with Paulo Moura (Biscoito Fino, 2006)
- Uma Tarde Com Bud Shank e João Donato (Biscoito Fino, 2007)
- O Piano De João Donato (Deckdisc, 2007)
- Donatural (Biscoito Fino, 2009)
- Água with Paula Morelenbaum (Biscoito Fino, 2010)
- Live Jazz in Rio Vol 1 - O Couro Ta Comendo (Discobertas, 2014)
- Live Jazz in Rio Vol 2 - O Bicho tá Pegando (Discobertas, 2014)
- Donato Elétrico (Selo, 2016)
- Sintetizamor (Polysom, 2017)
- Bluchanga (Mills Records, 2017)
- Raridades (Anos 70) (Discobertas, 2018)
- Gozando a Existência (Discobertas, 2018)

=== As sideman ===
With Vinicius Cantuária

- Siga-Me (EMI, 1985)
- Samba Carioca (Naïve, 2010)

With Nana Caymmi

- Renascer (1976)
- Nana (1977)

With Gal Costa

- Cantar (Philips, 1974)
- Gal Canta Caymmi (Philips, 1976)
- Estratosférica (Sony, 2015)

With Bebel Gilberto

- Tanto Tempo (Ziriguiboom, 2000)
- Bebel Gilberto (Ziriguiboom, 2004)

With Joyce

- Tudo Bonito (Epic, 2000)
- Bossa Duets (Sony, 2003)
- Aquarius (2009)

With Marisa Monte

- Memories, Chronicles, and Declarations of Love (Metro Blue, 2000)
- Infinito Particular (EMI, 2006)

With Mongo Santamaria

- !Arriba! La Pachanga (Fantasy, 1961)
- Mas Sabroso (Fantasy, 1961)
- Viva Mongo! (Fantasy, 1962)
- Mighty Mongo, (Fantasy, 1962)

With Cal Tjader

- The Prophet (Verve, 1968)
- Solar Heat (Skye, 1968)
- Sounds Out Burt Bacharach (Skye, 1969)

With others

- João Bosco, Linha e Passe (RCA Victor, 1979)
- Celso Fonseca, Liebe Paradiso (Dubas, 2011)
- Michael Franks, Sleeping Gypsy (Warner Bros., 1977)
- Astrud Gilberto, The Astrud Gilberto Album (Verve, 1965)
- João Gilberto, Chega De Saudade (2010)
- Toninho Horta, Cape Horn (2007)
- Marcelinho da Lua, Tranqüilo (Deckdisc, 2003)
- Jorge Mautner, Bomba de Estrelas (Warner Bros., 1981)
- Jards Macalé, Síntese do Lance, (Rocinante, 2021)
- Sergio Mendes, Sergio Mendes' Favorite Things (Atlantic, 1968)
- Miúcha & Tom Jobim, Miucha & Tom Jobim (RCA Victor, 1979)
- Paula Morelenbaum, Telecoteco (Universal, 2008)
- Milton Nascimento, Clube da Esquina 2 (EMI, 1978)
- Lisa Ono, Minha Saudade (Nana 1995)
- Eddie Palmieri, La Perfecta (Alegre, 1962)
- Dom Um Romão, Dom Um Romão (Muse, 1974)
- Emílio Santiago, Emílio Santiago (CID, 1975)
- Moacir Santos, Ouro Negro (Universal, 2001)
- Bud Shank, Bud Shank & His Brazilian Friends (Pacific Jazz, 1965)
- Robertinho Silva, Bodas de Prata (CBS, 1989)
- Raul de Souza, Bossa Eterna (Biscoito Fino, 2008)
- Caetano Veloso, Qualquer Coisa (Philips, 1975)
- Nara Leão, Os Meus Amigos São Um Barato (Philips, 1977)
