= Paquito D'Rivera =

Cuban saxophonist, clarinetist and composer (born 1948)

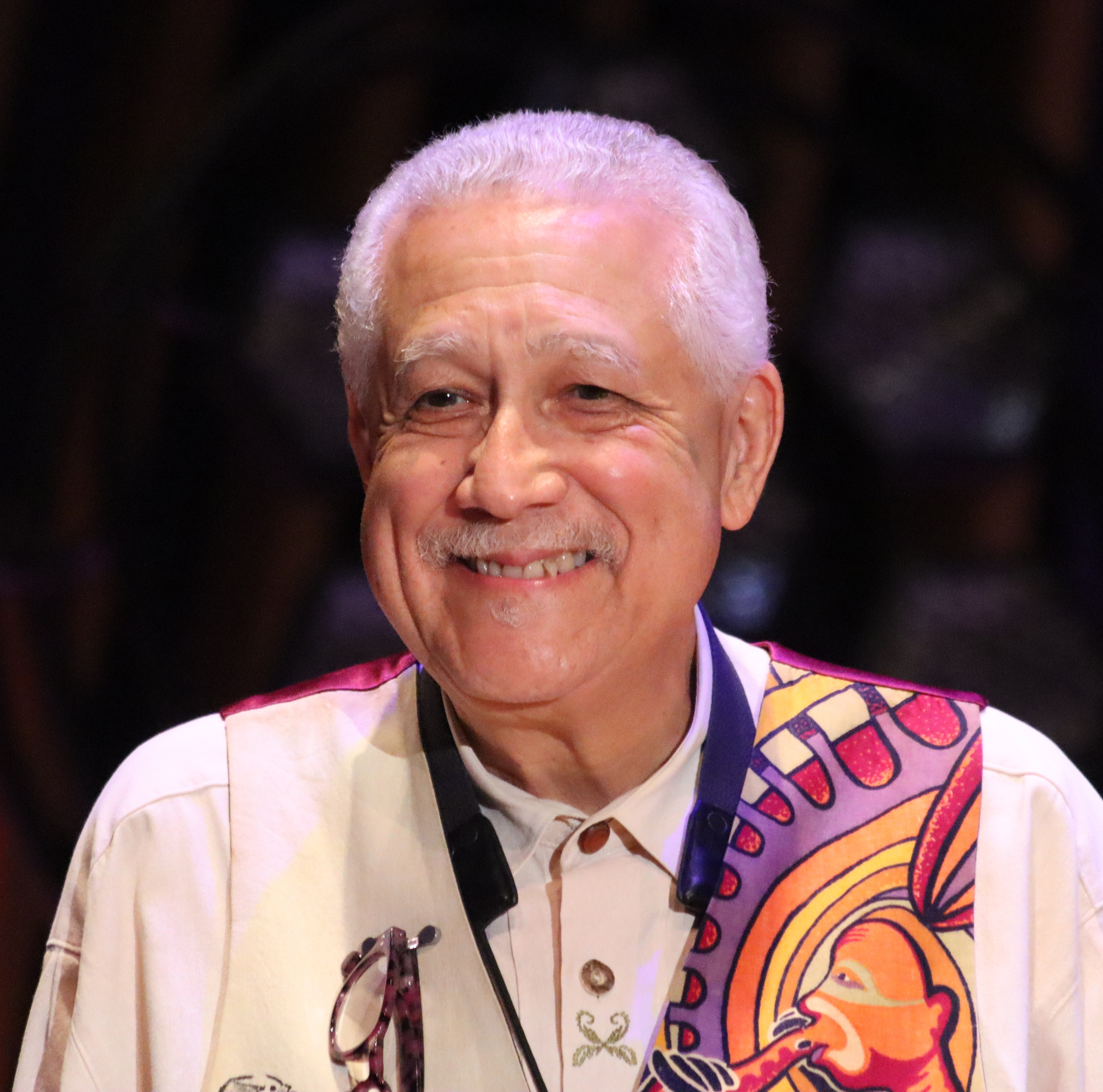
- D'Rivera in 2022

Background information
- Born: Francisco de Jesús Rivera Figueras; 4 June 1948 (age 78); Havana, Cuba
- Genres: Afro-Cuban jazz, songo, classical
- Occupations: Musician, composer, bandleader
- Instruments: Alto saxophone, clarinet
- Years active: 1965–present
- Labels: Sunnyside, Paquito Records
- Website: paquitodrivera.com

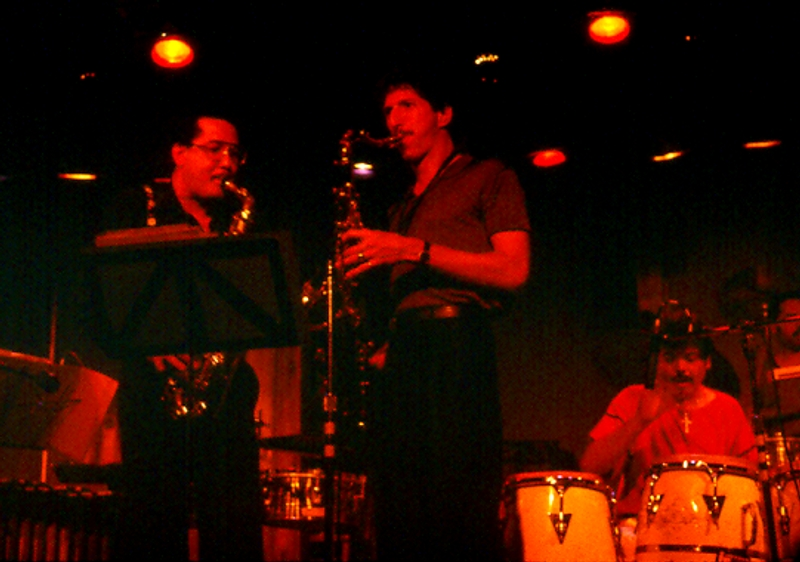
Paquito D'Rivera at the Village Gate

Francisco de Jesús Rivera Figueras (born 4 June 1948), known as Paquito D'Rivera, is a Cuban-American alto saxophonist, clarinetist and composer. He was a member of the Cuban songo band Irakere and, since the 1980s, he has established himself as a bandleader in the United States. His smooth saxophone tone and his frequent combination of Latin jazz and classical music have become his trademarks.

== Early life ==
Francisco de Jesús Rivera Figueras was born on 4 June 1948 in Havana, Cuba. His father played classical saxophone, entertained his son with Duke Ellington and Benny Goodman records and sold musical instruments. He took D'Rivera to clubs like the Tropicana (frequented by his musician friends and customers) and to concert bands and orchestras.

At age five, D'Rivera began saxophone lessons by his father Francisco Lorenzo Rivera Sanchez (tito). In 1960, he attended Alejandro Garcia Caturla Conservatory of Music, where he learned saxophone and clarinet In 1965, he was a featured soloist with the Cuban National Symphony Orchestra. He and Valdés founded Orchestra Cubana de Música Moderna and then in 1973 the group Irakere, which fused jazz, rock, classical, and Cuban music.

== Defection ==
By 1980, D'Rivera had become dissatisfied with the constraints placed on his music in Cuba for many years. In an interview with ReasonTV, D'Rivera recalled that the Cuban communist government described jazz and rock and roll as "imperialist" music that was officially discouraged in the 1960s/70s, and that a meeting with Che Guevara sparked his desire to leave Cuba. In early 1980, while on tour in Spain, he sought asylum with the American Embassy, leaving his wife and child and brother Enrique, who is also a saxophonist, behind, with a promise to bring them out of Cuba. He fulfilled that promise nine years later.

Upon his arrival in the United States, D'Rivera found great support for him and his family. His mother, Maura, and his sister, Rosario, had left Cuba in 1968 and became US citizens. Maura had worked in the US in the fashion industry for many years, and Rosario had become a respected artist and entrepreneur. Paquito was introduced to the jazz scene at some prestigious clubs and concert halls in New York. He became something of a phenomenon after the release of his first two solo albums, Paquito Blowin' (June 1981) and Mariel (July 1982).

In 2005, D'Rivera wrote a letter criticizing musician Carlos Santana for his decision to wear a T-shirt with the image of Che Guevara on it to the 2005 Academy Awards, citing Guevara's role in the execution of counter-revolutionaries in Cuba, including his own cousin.

== Career ==
D'Rivera has performed in venues such as Carnegie Hall and played with the National Symphony Orchestra, London Symphony Orchestra, London Philharmonic Orchestra, Florida Philharmonic Orchestra, Bronx Arts Ensemble, Puerto Rico Symphony Orchestra, YOA Orchestra of the Americas, Costa Rica National Symphony, American Youth Philharmonic, and Simón Bolívar Symphony Orchestra.

Throughout his career in the United States, D'Rivera's albums have received reviews from critics and have hit the top of the jazz charts. His albums have shown a progression that demonstrates his abilities in bebop, classical and Latin/Caribbean music. He is the only artist to ever have won Grammy Awards in both Classical and Latin Jazz categories.

D'Rivera was a judge for the 5th and 8th annual Independent Music Awards to support independent artists.

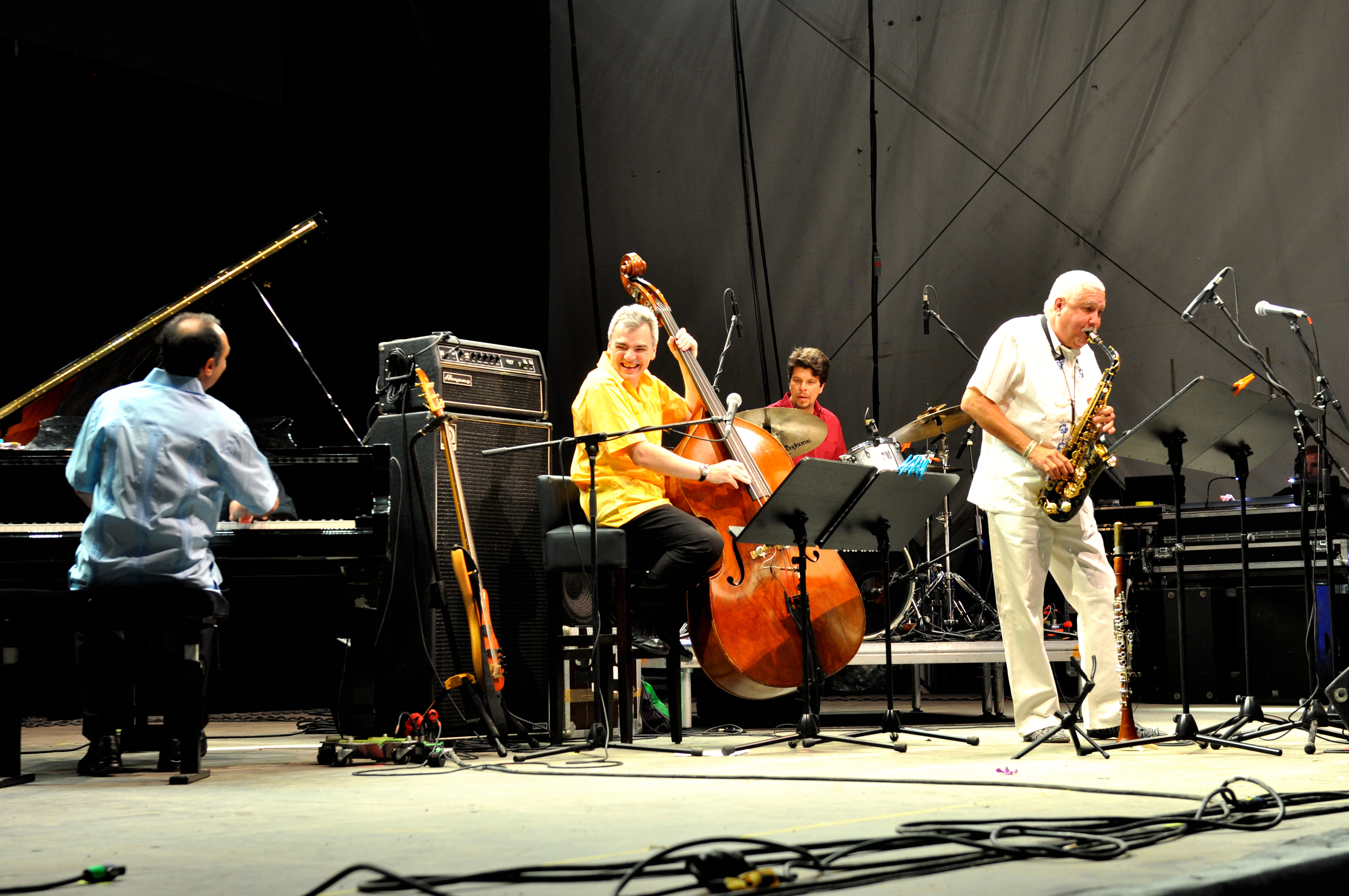
Paquito D'Rivera with the Trio Corrente at the 2015 Horizonte World Music Festival at Ehrenbreitstein Fortress

=== Paquito D'Rivera Quintet ===
The band backing D'Rivera consists of Peruvian bassist Oscar Stagnaro, Argentinean trumpeter Diego Urcola, American drummer Mark Walker, and pianist Alex Brown. As a whole they are named the "Paquito D'Rivera Quintet" and under this name they were awarded the Latin Grammy Award for Best Latin Jazz Album for the album Live at the Blue Note in 2001.

== Personal life ==
D'Rivera resides in North Bergen, New Jersey. In 2001 D'Rivera purchased a $750,000 colonial-style home, which is located on Boulevard East, overlooking the Hudson River. In September 2023, he put the home up for sale for $1.75 million.

== Honors and awards ==
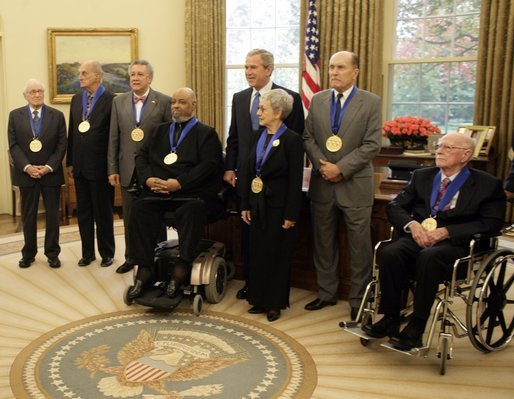
D'Rivera (third from left) stands alongside other recipients of the 2005 National Medal of Arts, and U.S. President George W. Bush, in the Oval Office on 9 November 2005.

- 2003 Doctorate Honoris Causa in Music, Berklee College of Music
- 2004 Clarinet of the Year Award, Jazz Journalists Association
- 2005 NEA Jazz Masters
- 2005 National Medal of Arts
- 2006 Clarinet of the Year, Jazz Journalists Association
- 2007 Composer in Residence, Caramoor Center for Music and the Arts
- 2007 Fellowship Award for Music Composition, Guggenheim Foundation
- 2007 Living Jazz Legend Award, The Kennedy Center and The Catherine B. Reynolds Foundation Series for Artistic Excellence
- 2008 President's Award, International Association for Jazz Educators
- 2012 Honorary Doctoral Degree, State University of New York at Old Westbury
- 2026 Konstantin Award, at Nisville Jazz Festival (Nis, Serbia) for contribution to jazz and music in general

=== Grammy Awards ===
- 1979 Irakere, Best Latin Recording – 22nd Annual Grammy Awards
- 1996 Portraits of Cuba won Best Latin Jazz Performance – 39th Annual Grammy Awards
- 2000 Tropicana Nights won Best Latin Jazz Album – 1st Annual Latin Grammy Awards
- 2001 Live at the Blue Note – won Best Latin Jazz Album – 2nd Annual Latin Grammy Awards
- 2003 Historia del Soldad won Best Classical Album – 4th Annual Latin Grammy Awards
- 2003 Brazilian Dreams won Best Latin Jazz Album – 4th Annual Latin Grammy Awards
- 2004 "Merengue" won Best Instrumental Composition – 47th Annual Grammy Awards
- 2008 Funk Tango won Best Latin Jazz Album – 50th Annual Grammy Awards
- 2011 Panamericana Suite won Best Classical Contemporary Composition - 12th Annual Latin GRAMMY Awards
- 2011 Panamericana Suite won Best Latin Jazz Album – 12th Annual Latin Grammy Awards
- 2013 Song For Maura won Best Latin Jazz Album, Paquito D'Rivera with Trio Corrente, 56th Annual GRAMMY Awards
- 2014 Song for Maura won Best Latin Jazz Album, Paquito D'Rivera with Trio Corrente, 15th Annual Latin GRAMMY Awards
- 2015 Jazz Meets the Classics won Best Latin Jazz Album - 16th Annual Latin Grammy Awards
- 2022 Latin Grammy Trustees Award from the 23rd Latin Recording Academy
- 2023 Concerto Venezolano won Best Contemporary Classical Composition from the 24th Annual Latin Grammys Awards
- 2023 I Missed You Too! won Best Latin Jazz/Jazz Album at the 24th Latin Grammys Awards
- 2026 La Fleur de Cayenne (Nomination) in the Best Latin Jazz Album category.

== Discography ==
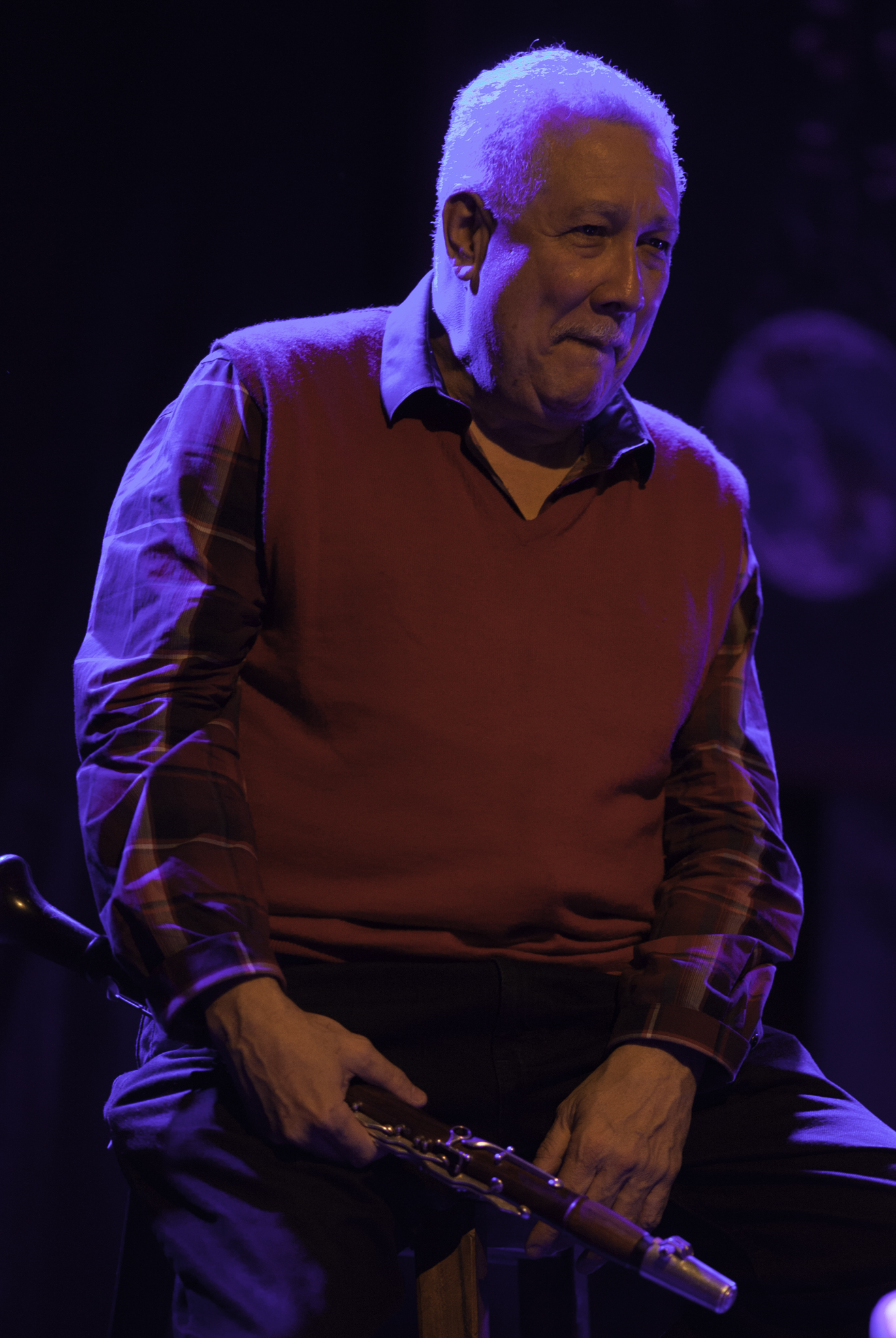
D'Rivera in 2013

=== As leader ===
- Blowin (Columbia, 1981)
- Mariel (Columbia, 1982)
- Live at Keystone Korner (Columbia, 1983)
- Why Not! (Columbia, 1984)
- Explosion (Columbia, 1986)
- A Tribute to Cal Tjader (Yemaya, 1986)
- Manhattan Burn (Columbia, 1987)
- Celebration (Columbia, 1988)
- Tico! Tico! (Chesky, 1989)
- Return to Ipanema (Town Crier, 1989)
- Reunion (Messidor, 1991)
- Havana Cafe (Chesky, 1992)
- Who's Smoking?! (Candid, 1992)
- La Habana-Rio-Conexion (Messidor, 1992)
- Paquito D'Rivera Presents 40 Years of Cuban Jam Session (Messidor, 1993)
- A Night in Englewood (Messidor, 1994)
- Portraits of Cuba (Chesky, 1996)
- Live at Manchester Craftsmen's Guild (MCG, 1997)
- Hay Solucion (BMG, 1998)
- 100 Years of Latin Love Songs (Heads Up, 1998)
- Tropicana Nights (Chesky, 1999)
- Habanera (Enja, 2000)
- The Clarinetist Volume One (Peregrina, 2001)
- Brazilian Dreams (MCG, 2002)
- Este Camino Largo (Yemaya, 2002)
- The Lost Sessions (Yemaya, 2002)
- Big Band Time (Pimienta, 2003)
- The Jazz Chamber Trio (Chesky, 2005)
- Benny Goodman Revisited (Connector, 2009)
- Quartier Latin (LKY, 2009)
- Panamericana Suite (MCG Jazz, 2010)
- Tango Jazz (Paquito, 2010)
- Song for Maura (Sunnyside/Paquito, 2013)
- Jazz Meets the Classics (Paquito, 2014)
- Aires Tropicales (Sunnyside/Paquito, 2015)
- Paquito & Manzanero (Sunnyside/Paquito, 2016)
- I Missed You Too! (Sunnyside/Paquito Records, 2022)

=== As sideman ===
With David Amram

- Havana/New York (Flying Fish, 1978)
- Latin Jazz Celebration (Elektra Musician, 1983)

With Mario Bauza

- Afro-Cuban Jazz (Caiman, 1986)
- Tanga (Messidor, 1992)

With Soledad Bravo

- Mambembe (Top Hits, 1983)
- Soledad Bravo (Sono-Rodven, 1985)

With Cachao

- Master Sessions Volume I (Sony, 1994)
- Master Sessions Volume II (Epic, 1995)

With Caribbean Jazz Project

- The Caribbean Jazz Project (Heads Up, 1995)
- Island Stories (Heads Up, 1997)
- The Gathering (Concord Picante, 2002)
- Mosaic (Concord Picante, 2006)

With Gloria Estefan

- Mi Tierra (Epic, 1993)
- Hold Me, Thrill Me, Kiss Me (Epic, 1994)

With Carlos Franzetti

- Prometheus (Audiophile, 1984)
- New York Toccata (Verve, 1985)

With Dizzy Gillespie

- Live at the Royal Festival Hall (Enja, 1990)
- To Bird with Love (Telarc, 1992)
- Bird Songs: The Final Recordings(Telarc, 1997)

With Conrad Herwig

- Another Kind of Blue (Half Note, 2004)
- Sketches of Spain y Mas (Half Note, 2006)

With Irakere

- Irakere (Columbia, 1979)
- Chekere Son (JVC, 1979)
- 2 (Columbia, 1979)

With Yo-Yo Ma

- Obrigado Brazil (Sony Classical, 2003)
- Obrigado Brazil Live in Concert (Sony Classical, 2004)
- Appassionato (Sony Classical, 2007)
- Songs of Joy & Peace (Sony Classical, 2008)

With Herbie Mann

- 65th Birthday Celebration (Lightyear, 1997)
- America, Brasil (Lightyear, 1997)

With Andy Narell

- The Passage (Heads Up, 2004)
- University of Calypso (Heads Up, 2009)

With Daniel Ponce

- New York Now! (Celluloid, 1983)
- Arawe (Antilles, 1987)

With Claudio Roditi

- Red on Red (CTI, 1984)
- Milestones (Candid, 1992)

With Lalo Schifrin

- More Jazz Meets the Symphony (Atlantic, 1994)
- Firebird: Jazz Meets the Symphony No. 3 (Four Winds, 1996)
- Gillespiana in Cologne (Aleph, 1998)

With Bebo Valdés

- Bebo Rides Again (Messidor, 1995)
- El Arte del Sabor (Blue Note, 2001)
- Suite Cubana (Calle 54, 2009)

With others

- Alex Acuña & Eva Ayllón, To My Country (Nido, 2002)
- Sergio Assad, Dances from the New World (GHA, 2013)
- Andres Boiarsky, Into the Light (Reservoir, 1997)
- Jeanie Bryson, Tonight I Need You So (Telarc, 1994)
- Michel Camilo, One More Once (Columbia, 1994)
- Valerie Capers, Come on Home (Sony, 1995)
- Ana Caram, Rio After Dark (Chesky, 1989)
- Regina Carter, I'll Be Seeing You (Verve 2006)
- Ed Cherry, First Take (Groovin' High 1993)
- Anat Cohen, Claroscuro (Anzic, 2012)
- Richie Cole, Kush (Heads Up, 1995)
- Chris Connor, Classic (Contemporary, 1987)
- Hilario Durán, From the Heart (Alma, 2006)
- Sui Generis, Sinfonias Para Adolescentes (2000)
- Giovanni Hidalgo, Villa Hidalgo (Messidor, 1992)
- Levon Ichkhanian, After Hours (Jazz Heritage Society 1996)
- Denise Jannah, I Was Born in Love with You (Blue Note, 1995)
- Dana Leong, Leaving New York (Tateo Sound 2006)
- Raul Midon, A World Within a World (Manhattan, 2007)
- Michael Philip Mossman, The Orisha Suite (Connector, 2001)
- Chico O'Farrill, Heart of a Legend (Milestone, 1999)
- Makoto Ozone, Live & Let Live (Verve, 2011)
- Rosa Passos, Amorosa (Sony Classical, 2004)
- Oscar Peñas, Music of Departures and Returns (Musikoz, 2014)
- Roberto Perera, Seduction (Heads Up, 1994)
- Astor Piazzolla, The Rough Dancer and the Cyclical Night (American Clave, 1988)
- Tito Puente, Live at the Village Gate (Bellaphon, 1993)
- Bobby Sanabria, New York City Ache! (Flying Fish, 1993)
- Bernardo Sassetti, Salsetti (West Wind, 2000)
- Omar Sosa, Mulatos (Ota 2004)
- Janis Siegel, Experiment in White (Wounded Bird, 2002)
- Clark Terry, Live at the Village Gate (Chesky, 1991)
- McCoy Tyner, La Leyenda de La Hora (Columbia, 1981)
- Diego Urcola Quartet, El Duelo (Sunnyside, 2020)
- Turtle Island String Quartet, Danzon (Koch, 2005)
- Nancy Wilson, R.S.V.P. (Rare Songs, Very Personal) (MCG, 2004)
