= Ed Motta =

Brazilian musician (born 1971)

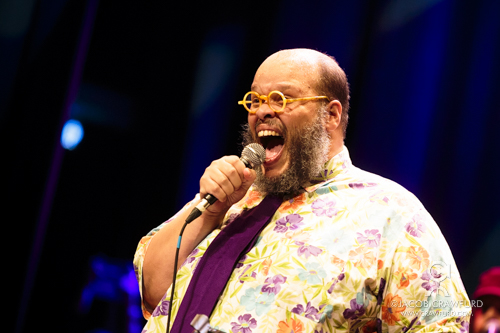

Background information
- Born: Eduardo Motta; August 17, 1971 (age 55); Rio de Janeiro, Brazil
- Genres: Rock; soul; funk; jazz
- Instruments: Keyboard; electric guitar
- Website: edmotta.com

Eduardo "Ed" Motta (Brazilian Portuguese pronunciation: [eduˈaʁdu ˈmɔtɐ]; born August 17, 1971) is a Brazilian MPB, rock, soul, funk and jazz musician. He is the nephew of late singer-songwriter Tim Maia.

== Career ==
Son of Luzia Motta (sister of Tim Maia) and Antonio Motta, Ed Motta listened to disco, soul and funk from an early age. He became a fan of rock music as a teenager.

His musical career started as vocalist of the hard rock band Kabbalah. After hearing Jeff Beck's album "Blow by Blow", he realized that the British guitarist had soul and funk influences. While still in his teens, he abandoned his studies to dedicate himself to music, and explored a fascination with soul music. He worked as a DJ and produced the fanzine "Curto Circuito", eventually meeting guitarist Luiz Fernando Comprido, with whom he formed the "Expresso Realengo", later renamed "Conexão Japeri" which recorded their first album in 1988.

In 1990 Motta departed to begin his solo career, recording his debut Um Contrato Com Deus, where he played almost all the instruments by himself. Since then he has released several solo albums. In 1997 he supplied the soundtrack to the film, Pequeno Dicionário Amoroso (The Book of Love).

In 1994, he lived in New York City for a year. There he recorded an album with American musicians that has not been released yet. He discovered the universes of classical music, which eventually reflected on his musical conception. Once opposed to Brazilian music, he discovered that foreign artists had recorded Brazilian songs, such as recordings of Francis Hime's Minha by jazz artist Bill Evans, and discovered a partnership between Brazilian Marcos Valle and American Leon Ware, famous for composing the song I Wanna Be Where You Are, recorded by Michael Jackson.

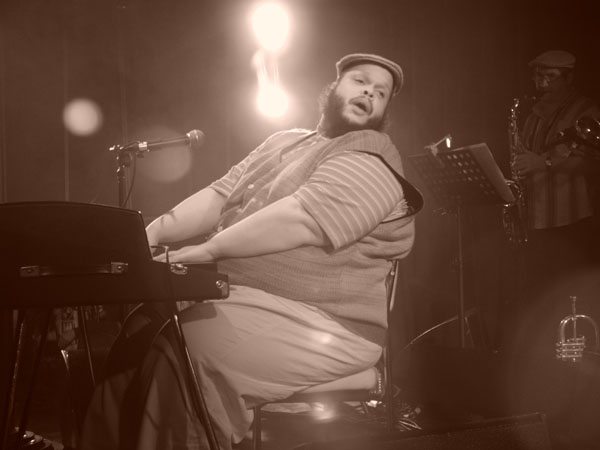
Ed Motta playing keyboard in 2006.

In 1999 he translated Phil Collins's songs for the Disney film Tarzan into Brazilian Portuguese.

His album Aystelum was nominated for the Latin Grammy Awards of 2006 in the Latin jazz category.

Motta has worked with Cassiano, Roy Ayers, 4 Hero, Seu Jorge, Eliane Elias, Incognito, Bo Diddley and Ryuichi Sakamoto among others.

His work covers a variety of genres from jazz to popular Brazilian music, rock to Hollywood film soundtracks, funk, classical music, AOR, bossa nova and reggae.

== Controversies ==
Motta is known for controversies involving fans and fellow artists.

During a 2015 tour, Motta criticized Brazilians who at concerts would request songs in Portuguese, Brazil's native language. The singer would go on to claim those were "simple-minded", "rednecks", "native", "Brazilian bricklayers" fans of other musical genres who "jumped like animals", while calling Brazil a "shitty", "ignorant land". He has since apologized.

During an Instagram live broadcast he called hip hop fans "stupid", prompting backlash from fans and artists.

== Selected discography ==
Title	Released	Label	Formats	Brazil sales	Certifications
Conexao Japeri	1988	WEA Records			
Um Contrato com Deus	1990	WEA Records	LP, K7	15,000	
Entre e Ouça	1992	WEA Records	LP, K7, Digital download	5,000	
Ao Vivo (live)	1993	WEA Records			
Manual Prático para Festas, Bailes e Afins - Vol. 1	1997	Universal Music	Digital download, CD	300,000	ABPD: Platinum
Remixes & Aperitivos	1998	Universal Music	Digital download, CD	100,000	ABPD: Gold
As Segundas Intenções do Manual Prático	2000	Universal Music	Digital download, CD	65,000	
Dwitza	January 2002	Universal Music	Digital download, CD	50,000	
Poptical	2003	Trama	Digital download, CD, LP	40,000	
Aystelum	2005	Trama	Digital download, CD	45,000	
Perfil	2005	Som Livre	Digital download, CD	50,000	
Ao Vivo (live)	2006	Trama			
Chapter 9	2010	Trama	Digital download, CD	10,000	
Piquenique	2009	Trama	Digital download, CD	10,000	
AOR	2013	LAB 344	Digital download, CD, LP	2,000	
Perpetual Gateways	2016	LAB 344	Digital download, CD, LP	1,000	
Criterion of the Senses	2018	Membran	Digital download, CD, LP		
Behind the Tea Chronicles	2023	Dwitza	Digital download, CD, LP		
Toc-Toc (album)	2026	Dwitza, MPS	Digital download, CD, LP		

- Behind The Tea Chronicles (2024)
- Behind The Tea Chronicles (2024)
