= Xiomara =

Xiomara may refer to:

- Xiomara (given name), female given name of Spanish origin
- Xiomara (genus), zoological genus in the family of Ichneumonidae

== People with given name Xiomara ==
- Xiomara Alfaro (1930–2018), Cuban soprano
- Xiomara Blandino (born 1984), Miss Nicaragua 2007
- Xiomara Castro (born 1959), also called Xiomara de Zelaya, current Honduran president
- Xiomara De Oliver (born 1967), Canadian artist
- Xiomara Griffith (born 1969), Venezuelan female judoka
- Xiomara Laugart, Cuban singer, New York-based
- Xiomara Reyes, principal dancer at American Ballet Theatre
- Xiomara Rivero (born 1968), retired Cuban athlete who competed in the javelin throw
- Xiomara Villanueva, a character on The CW series Jane the Virgin
- Xiomara Xibille, Colombian host of the children's program, Nubeluz
- Xiomara Zelaya (born 1985), Honduran politician, daughter of presidents Manuel Zelaya and Xiomara Castro
