= Xiomara (given name) =

- Language: Guanche, Germanic, Breton

Origin
- Meaning: battle ready, battle famous, horse worthy, most beautiful star of the universe.

Other names
- Variant forms: male form: Xiomar, Siomara, Guiomara, Jhomara

Xiomara is a feminine Spanish given name, which is probably of Guanche ancestry that can be compared with Guacimara or Autinmara, which share the same suffixes.

It is also less likely a variant of Guiomar and derived from the German name Wigmar, which means "battle ready" or "battle famous" (also a homophone of the Guanche toponym Güímar) or derived from uuiu (cf. gwiw) which means worthy in Old Breton and marc'h (cf. marc'h) which means horse in Breton. In the United States it ranked 986th place in names for female newborns in 2010.

== Notable people with the name include ==
- Xiomara Alfaro (1930–2018), Cuban soprano
- Xiomara Blandino (born 1984), Miss Nicaragua 2007
- Xiomara Castro (born 1959), Honduran president
- Xiomara De Oliver (born 1967), Canadian-born artist
- Xiomara Fortuna (born 1959), Dominican singer
- Xiomara Getrouw (born 1994), Surinamese swimmer
- Xiomara Griffith (born 1969), Venezuelan judoka
- Xiomara Larios (born 1958), Nicaraguan sprinter
- Xiomara Laugart (born 1960), Cuban singer
- Xiomara Mass (born 1988), Puerto Rican oboist
- Xiomara Molero (born 1971), Puerto Rican volleyball player and coach
- Xiomara Reyes (born 1983), Cuban ballet dancer
- Xiomara Rivero (born 1968), retired Cuban athlete who competed in the javelin throw
- Xiomara Scott, Venezuelan nurse killed during the 2017 protests in Venezuela
- Xiomara Vidal (born 1955), Cuban trovadora
- Xiomara Xibille, Colombian host of the children's program, Nubeluz
- Xiomara Zelaya (born 1985), Honduran politician, daughter of presidents Manuel Zelaya and Xiomara Castro

== Fictional character ==
- Xiomara Villanueva, a character on The CW series Jane the Virgin
