= Andres Levin =

Venezuelan musician

Andrés Levín
- Born: September 30, 1968 (age 57); Caracas, Venezuela
- Genres: Latin, Pop, Rock, R&B
- Occupations: Producer, film maker, song-writer, musician, composer, philanthropist, arranger, guitarist
- Instruments: Guitar, bass, keyboards, programming
- Years active: 1988–present
- Label: Tribe Caribe

Andrés Levín is a Venezuelan-born American record producer, bandleader, filmmaker, recording engineer and philanthropist. After several nominations, Levin won a Grammy Award in 2009 for his production of the In the Heights cast recording. His Grammy-nominated Latin fusion band Yerba Buena was founded along with Cuban-American singer Cucu Diamantes.

Levin has been called the "master-chef of urban fusion" by the Los Angeles Times.

== Early life ==
Levín, son of Argentinians, was born in Caracas, Venezuela. Since his father is a musician and producer as well, Levin was surrounded by music. He began playing guitar at age 10 and was soon immersed in the musical world. In 1988, Levin took advantage of a full scholarship at Berklee School of Music in Boston, Massachusetts before studying composition at Juilliard in New York City. While in New York, Levin worked at Skyline studios and was soon hired by producer Nile Rodgers as a full-time Synclavier programmer and arranger. With Rodgers, Levin worked with artists such as the B-52's, Diana Ross, INXS, and The Vaughan Brothers.

== Yerba Buena ==
Together with Diamantes, Levin formed the band Yerba Buena. Before Yerba Buena, Levin had worked in several disparate genres, including R&B, soul, and Latin. Levin said that the same year the band was founded, he had been in Nigeria, Cuba, and Bahia... [and] those influences combined to form the Yerba Buena sound." Levin has also said that even though Yerba Buena "experiments with many influences, the basis of the group is inspired by the African and Cuban diaspora, where both worlds meet. The music is a bridge between the two cultures."

== Film ==
In 2012, Levin produced his first film alongside Sarah Green, Amor Cronico. Directed by Jorge Perugorría Since then he has been involved in feature and documentary films as producer, exec producer, associate producer or consultant such as : Guava Island (Amazon), Fate of the Furious (Universal), Habana Motor Club, and several documentaries for Amazon which he also directed.

== Advertising ==
Levin has been involved in the music for advertising industry since 1995. In the fall of 2009 he launched Pirata (with Canadian partner Pirate) to provide sonic branding and audio post production for all aspects of broadcast audio, such as original music and licensing, sound design, full service radio production and 5.1 mixing. Since its creation, Pirata has provided work for Dr. Pepper, Verizon, Miller, Heineken, Cablevision, Kraft, Ritz, and Kohl's.

== Discography ==
=== Studio albums ===
Year	Album	Role	Notes
2017	Paulina Rubio - 2 en1: Pau-Latina/Paulina	Composer	
2017	Natalie Merchant, The Natalie Merchant Collection	Producer	
2014	Fonseca, Jon Batiste, Rise Up	Producer	
2014	Miguel Bosé, Amo	Co-producer	Nominated to the Latin Grammy Awards 2015 - Album of the year
2014	Coreon Du, Binario	Producer	
2014	Arto Lindsay - Encyclopedia of Arto	Producer	
2014	Aleks Syntek - Romántico Desliz	Producer	
2013	Cucu Diamantes - Amor Cronico	Producer - Composer	
2012	Miguel Bosé, Papitwo	Co-producer	
2012	John Legend, Love I’ve Never Known	Producer, Co-writer	
2011	Fonseca, Ilusión	Producer	Winner of 2012 Grammy: Best Tropical Fusion Album / Nominated 2013 Latin Pop Grammy
2011	Les Nubians - Nü Revolution	Producer	
2011	Donna D'Cruz - Rasa Swank		
2010	Natalie Merchant, Leave Your Sleep	Co-producer	
2010	Bill Coleman - Remixxer	Producer	
2010	Ana Torroja, Sonrisa	Producer	
2010	Aleks Syntek, Métodos de Placer Instantáneo	Co-producer	
2010	Chiara Civello, 7752	Co-producer	
2009	In The Heights Cast Album	Producer	Winner of 2009 Grammy: Best Cast Album
2009	Cucu Diamantes, Cuculand	Producer	
2009	Pitingo - Todo Pitingo	Producer	
2009	Beatriz Luengo, Carrousel	Producer	
2009	Paulina Rubio, Gran City Pop	Producer	
2008	Ultra Naté - Alchemy: G.S.T. Reloaded	A&R	
2008	Ely Guerra - Plug & Play	Composer	
2007	Miguel Bosé, Papito	Co-producer	Nominated for 2007 Latin Grammy
2007	Yerba Buena, Follow Me	Producer/ Writer	
2007	Orishas, Antiodiotico	Producer	Produced five songs; three 2007 Latin Grammy Nominations
2007	Voltio - En Lo Claro	Producer	
2007	Feel the Noise	Producer	
2007	Ultra Naté - Grime, Silk & Thunder	Producer	
2007	Louie Vega in the House	A&R	
2006	Hector On Stilts, Same Height Relation	Producer	
2006	Marisa Monte, Universo Ao Meu Redor	Producer	
2006	Eliane Elias, Around the City	Producer/ Writer	
2006	Marta Sánchez - En Directo: Gira 2005 La Coruña	Composer	
2006	Explorations: Classic Picante Regrooved, Vol. 1	Producer	
2006	La Habana de Noche	Composer	
2006	Xiomara Laugart - Xiomara	Producer	
2005	Yerba Buena, Island Life	Producer/ Writer	
2005	Orishas, El Kilo	Producer	Nominated for 2005 and 2006 Latin Grammy: Best Latin Alternative Album
2005	Marta Sánchez - Lo Mejor de Marta Sanchez		
2005	Diego el Cigala - Picasso en Mis Ojos		
2005	Haydée - Haydée	Programming	
2004	Ana Torroja, Essential	Producer/ Writer	Produced and wrote four songs
2004	Paulina Rubio, Pau-Latina	Writer	Wrote one song, "My Friend, My Amigo"
2004	Carlinhos Brown - Carlinhos Brown es Carlito Marron	Producer	
2004	Blaze - Found Love	Producer	
2004	Moreno Veloso - Máquina de Escrever Música Remix	Producer	
2003	Yerba Buena, President Alien	Producer/ Writer	Nominated for 2003 Grammy: Best Latin Alternative Album
2002	Nicole, Viaje Infinito	Producer	Nominated for 2002 Latin Grammy: Best Female Pop Vocal Album
2002	Lenine, Falange Canibal	Writer	Wrote one song, "Dolores." Won 2002 Latin Grammy
2002	Red Hot and Riot: The Music and Spirit of Fela Kuti	Co-producer	Produced nine songs
2001	Bilal, 1st Born Second	Producer	Produced one song
2001	Pánico, Telephatic sonora	Producer	
2000	Daniela Mercury, Sol Da Liberdade	Producer	
2000	Cyrius, Le sang des roses	Co-producer/ Musician	
1999	Ana Torroja, Pasajes de un Sueño	Producer/ Writer	
1996-1999	Arto Lindsay, The Prize, Mundo Civilizado, Noon Chill, Hypercivilizado, Invoke	Producer/ Writer	
1998	Aterciopelados, Caribe Atomico	Producer	Nominated for 1998 Grammy: Best Latin Rock
1998	Los Amigos Invisibles, The New Sound of the Venezuelan Gozadera	Producer	
1998	El Gran Silencio, Libres y Locos	Producer	
1998	Carlinhos Brown, Omelette Man	Producer	
1997	David Byrne, Feelings	Producer	Produced two songs, "Finite=Alright" and "The Civil Wars"
1997	Red Hot + Latin: Silencio = Muerte	Producer	
1997	Deborah Blando, "UnicaMente"	Producer/ Writer/ Musician	Produced songs, "Unicamente" and "Gata"
1997	Marta Sánchez, "Azabache"	Co-produced/ Writer/ Musician	Co-produced songs, "Moja Mi Corazón" and "Lampara Mágica"
1996	David Byrne and Marisa Monte, Red Hot and Rio	Producer	Produced one song, "Waters of March"
1996	Mundo Civilizado	Producer	
1996	Red Hot + Rio	Producer	
1996	Tina Turner - Wildest Dreams	Producer	
1995	Chaka Khan, The Woman I Am	Writer	
1995	Doro, Machine II Machine	Producer/ Writer/ Musician	Co-produced and co-wrote four songs
1995	Jennifer Love Hewitt, Let's Go Bang	Writer	One song, "The Difference Between Us"
1994	Cece Peniston, Thought 'Ya Knew	Producer/Writer	One song, "Through Those Doors"
1992	Tyler	Producer, Composer	Album
1991	Mica Paris, Contribution	Writer/Producer (with Camus Celli)	
1991	Nia Peeples, Nia Peeples	Producer (with Camus Celli)	One song, "Heaven Help Me"
1989	Eddie Murphy So Happy	Keyboard Programming	

=== Film ===
Year	Title	Role	Notes
2019	Guava Island Fear - Childish Gambino and Rhiana Amazon Prime	Music Producer and Consultant	
2019	Guava Island Mini Docs Amazon Prime	Producer	
2018	Bucket List feat. Will Smith Facebook TV	Producer	
2018	Tata-Guines Documentary/work in progress	Producer	
2018	La Bicicletawork in progress	Executive Producer	
2017	4 Seasons in Havana NETFLIX	Music supervisor/Music producer and composer-theme song	
2017	Cuba Dance HBO	Producer/ Cuba Production Services	
2017	Cuba Skate FUSION	Cuba Production Services	
2017	The Fate of Furious UNIVERSAL	Cuba Production Services/Itaca Manager	
2016	Havana Motor Club	Associate Producer	
2015	Hotel Transylvania 2	Soundtrack I'm In Love with a Monster, Co-producer with Salaam Remy	
2015	Aztec Warrior	Composer	
2015	Spare Parts	Soundtrack Music Producer, Composer	
2014	Bocaccerias Habaneras	Composer	
2013	Se Vende	Executive Music Producer, Composer	
2012	Amor Cronico	Film Producer, Executive Music Producer, Composer	
2007	Ladron Que Roba Ladron	Composer	
2007	Borderland	Composer	
2007	El Cantante	Composer	
2004	Dirty Dancing: Havana Nights	Composer	Three songs used
2003	Cheaper by the Dozen	Composer	"Guajira (I Love U 2 Much)" used
2003	Honey	Composer	"Guajira (I Love U 2 Much)" used
2003	Chasing Papi	Composer	"Electric Boogaloo" used
1999	Red Hot and Lisbon	Producer	Produced five songs

=== Television ===
Year	Album	Role	Notes
2008	Heroes Original Soundtrack	Composer	One song, "Maya's Theme"
2006	South Beach	Composer	Wrote Theme Song
2004	Entourage	Composer	
2003	ER	Composer	
