= Live in London =

Live in London may refer to:

- Live in London, an album by Amon Düül II, 1973
- I Told You I Was Trouble: Live in London, a video (2007) and album (2015) by Amy Winehouse
- Live in London (Andraé Crouch album), 1978
- Live in London (April Wine video), 1981
- Live in London: Babymetal World Tour 2014, a video album, 2015
- Live in London (Beach Boys album), 1970
- Live in London, an album by the Berzerker, 2010
- Live in London (Brand New Heavies album), 2009
- Live in London, an EP by Bridgit Mendler, 2013
- Live in London (Christone Ingram album), 2023
- Live in London (Deep Purple album), 1982
- Live in London, an album by the Dickies, 2002
- Live in London 1980, an album by the Fall, 1982
- Live in London (Flight of the Conchords album), 2018
- Live in London (The Gaslight Anthem video), 2013
- Live in London (Gene Harris album), 2008
- Live in London (George Michael video), 2009
- Ride a White Horse: Live in London E.P., by Goldfrapp, 2006
- Live in London, by Great White, 1990
- Hannah Montana: Live in London, a concert, 2007
- Live in London (Helen Reddy album), 1978
- Live in London (Hyperbubble album), 2015
- Live in London (Il Divo), 2011
- Live in London, a video (2006) and album (2008) by Iona
- Live in London, an album by John Holt, 1984
- Live in London, an album by John Illsley
- Live in London (Johnny Diesel and the Injectors EP), 1989
- Live in London (Judas Priest album), 2003
- Live in London (Judas Priest video), 2002
- Live in London (Judith Durham album), 2014
- Live in London, an album by Kelis, 2014
- Live in London March 2011, an album by KT Tunstall
- Live in London (Leonard Cohen album), 2009
- Live in London (Matana Roberts album), 2011
- Live in London (Mavis Staples album), 2019
- Live in London (Michel Camilo album), 2017
- Live in London 2011, by Miyavi, 2011
- Live in London (Natalie Imbruglia EP), 2007
- Live in London (The Only Ones album), 1989
- Live in London (Peggy Lee album), 1977
- Live in London (R5 EP), 2014
- Live in London (Regina Spektor album), 2010
- Live in London (Ricky Skaggs album), 1985
- Live in London, an album by Scott Matthews, 2010
- Live in London (Steppenwolf album), 1981
- Live in London 1986, an album by Suzanne Vega, 1986
- Live in London (Testament album), 2005
- Live in London, by the Toasters, 1998
- Live in London (Will Young video), 2005
- Live in London (Zeal & Ardor album), 2019

== See also ==
- Live in London & New York, an album by Corinne Bailey Rae, 2007
- Live in London Town, a video by William Control, 2013
- London Live (disambiguation)
