= One More Once =

Studio album by Michel Camilo
- Released: September 27, 1994
- Recorded: May 20–26, 1994
- Studios: Carriage House Studios, Connecticut
- Genre: Latin jazz
- Length: 63:18
- Label: Columbia
- Producers: Michel Camilo, Julio Marti

Michel Camilo chronology
Rendezvous (1993)	One More Once (1994)	Hands of Rhythm (1997)

Professional ratings
Review scores
Source	Rating
The Penguin Guide to Jazz Recordings	3/4 stars

One More Once is a 1994 album by the Latin jazz pianist Michel Camilo.

== Track listing ==
1. "One More Once" (Michel Camilo) – 4:50
2. "Why Not!" (Michel Camilo) – 6:42
3. "The Resolution" (Michel Camilo) – 3:30
4. "Suite Sandrine, Pt. 3" (Michel Camilo) – 9:14
5. "Dreamlight" (Michel Camilo) – 8:47
6. "Just Kidding'" (Michel Camilo) – 5:17
7. "Caribe" (Michel Camilo) – 7:04
8. "Suntan" (Michel Camilo) – 5:57
9. "On the Other Hand" (Michel Camilo) – 5:49
10. "Not Yet" (Michel Camilo) – 6:08

== Personnel ==
- Michel Camilo – piano
- Chris Hunter – alto saxophone
- Paquito D'Rivera – alto saxophone
- Ralph Bowen – tenor saxophone
- Craig Handy – tenor saxophone
- Gary Smulyan – baritone saxophone
- Jon Faddis – trumpet
- Michael Mossman – trumpet
- Stanton Davis, Jr. – trumpet
- Brian Lynch – trumpet
- Ryan Kisor – trumpet
- Dave Bargeron – trombone
- Conrad Herwig – trombone
- Ed Neumeister – trombone
- Douglas Purviance – trombone
- David Taylor – trombone
- Chuck Loeb – electric guitar
- Giovanni Hidalgo – percussion, bongos, conga, timbales
- Guarionex Aquino – percussion, bongos, tambourine, chekere, guiro
- Cliff Almond – drums
- Marvin "Smitty" Smith – drums
- Anthony Jackson – bass guitar
