= Pichu (disambiguation) =

Pichu is a Pokémon, first introduced in the generation II games.

Pichu may also refer to:

- P. Sri Acharya (1886–1981), an Indian Tamil writer
- Pichu Sambamoorthi (1901–1973), an Indian musicologist
- Iván Cuéllar (born 1994), a Spanish footballer nicknamed Pichu
- Xiomara Zelaya (born 1985), a Honduran politician
- Pichu Atienza (born 1990), a Spanish footballer

== See also ==
- Machu Picchu, a 15th-century Inca citadel and UNESCO World Heritage Site in Peru
- Pichu Pichu, an inactive volcano in the Andes of Peru
- Pikachu, a Pokémon
- LilyPichu (born 1991), an American streamer
