= Live in London (Michel Camilo album) =

Live album by Michel Camilo
- Released: 2017
- Recorded: June 13, 2015
- Venue: Queen Elizabeth Hall, London
- Genre: Jazz
- Label: Redondo Music

Live in London is a solo piano album by Michel Camilo. It was recorded in concert in 2015 and released by Redondo Music.

== Recording and music ==
The album of solo piano performances was recorded in concert at the Queen Elizabeth Hall, London, on June 13, 2015. Camilo's "Island Beat" is based on the Cuban montuno. "Sandra's Serenade" was written for his wife.

== Release and reception ==
Live in London was released by Redondo Music in 2017. It was Camilo's third solo piano album release, after Solo and What's Up?

DownBeat wrote: "Throughout the concert, Camilo's layering of texture and color is decidedly orchestral – his right hand suggesting contrapuntal interplay between horns while his left hand propels the proceedings like an animated bass, moving by turns from a purposeful walk to a hyperkinetic stride." The JazzTimes reviewer commented that "It takes enormous technical facility to play the piano this hard and fast and ornately. Even at full tilt, Camilo never seems to make a mistake. He also never touches feelings deeper than those that might be aroused by, say, the backflips of an Olympic gymnast."

== Track listing ==
1. "From Within"
2. "The Frim Fram Sauce"
3. "A Place in Time"
4. "Island Beat"
5. "Sandra's Serenade"
6. "Manteca"
7. "I Got Rhythm/Caravan/Sing Sing Sing"

== Personnel ==
- Michel Camilo – piano
