= Pretty Please =

Pretty Please may refer to:

- Pretty Please (album), album by Hector on Stilts 2000
- "Pretty Please" (Dua Lipa song), 2020
- "Pretty Please" (Hearts2Hearts song), 2025
- "Pretty Please", also "Pretty Please (Love Me)", song by Estelle 2008
- "Pretty Please", song and video by Jackson Wang & Galantis
- "Pretty Please", song by Melissa Reese
