= On the Other Hand (album) =

Studio album by Michel Camilo
- Released: 1990
- Recorded: April 1990
- Studios: Clinton Recording Studios, NYC
- Genre: Latin jazz
- Label: Epic
- Producer: Michel Camilo

Michel Camilo chronology
On Fire (1989)	On the Other Hand (1990)	Rendezvous (1993)

On the Other Hand is an album by the Dominican musician Michel Camilo, released in 1990 by Epic Records.

== Critical reception ==
Professional ratings
Review scores
Source	Rating
AllMusic	2.5/5 stars
Select	3/5 medals

Newsday wrote that Camilo's "classical-jazz-Latin synthesis is one of the more avant-garde statements by a contemporary pianist... Rather than simply pumping up jazz tunes with Latin rhythmic structures, he speaks in several musical languages at once, prefiguring a multicultural future." The Globe and Mail noted that "as impressive a pianist as Camilo clearly is, he startles not by what he plays, but by how: chop, chop, chop—quick, clean and on the flashy side of frantic."

== Track listing ==
No.	Title	Writer(s)	Length
1.	"On the Other Hand"	Camilo	4:05
2.	"City of the Angels"	Pastorius	4:25
3.	"Journey"	Camilo	5:46
4.	"Impressions"	Coltrane	5:45
5.	"Silent Talk I"	Camilo	3:42
6.	"Forbidden Fruit"	Camilo, Eigenburg	4:23
7.	"Suite Sandrine, Pt. 3"	Camilo	8:46
8.	"Birk's Works"	Gillespie	5:49
9.	"Silent Talk II"	Camilo	4:37

== Personnel ==
- Michel Camilo – piano
- Chris Hunter – saxophone
- Ralph Bowen – saxophone
- Michael Mossman – trumpet
- Cliff Almond – drums
- Michael Bowie – bass
- D.K. Dyson – vocals
- Sammy Figueroa – percussion, congas
