= Horacio "El Negro" Hernández =

Cuban drummer and percussionist

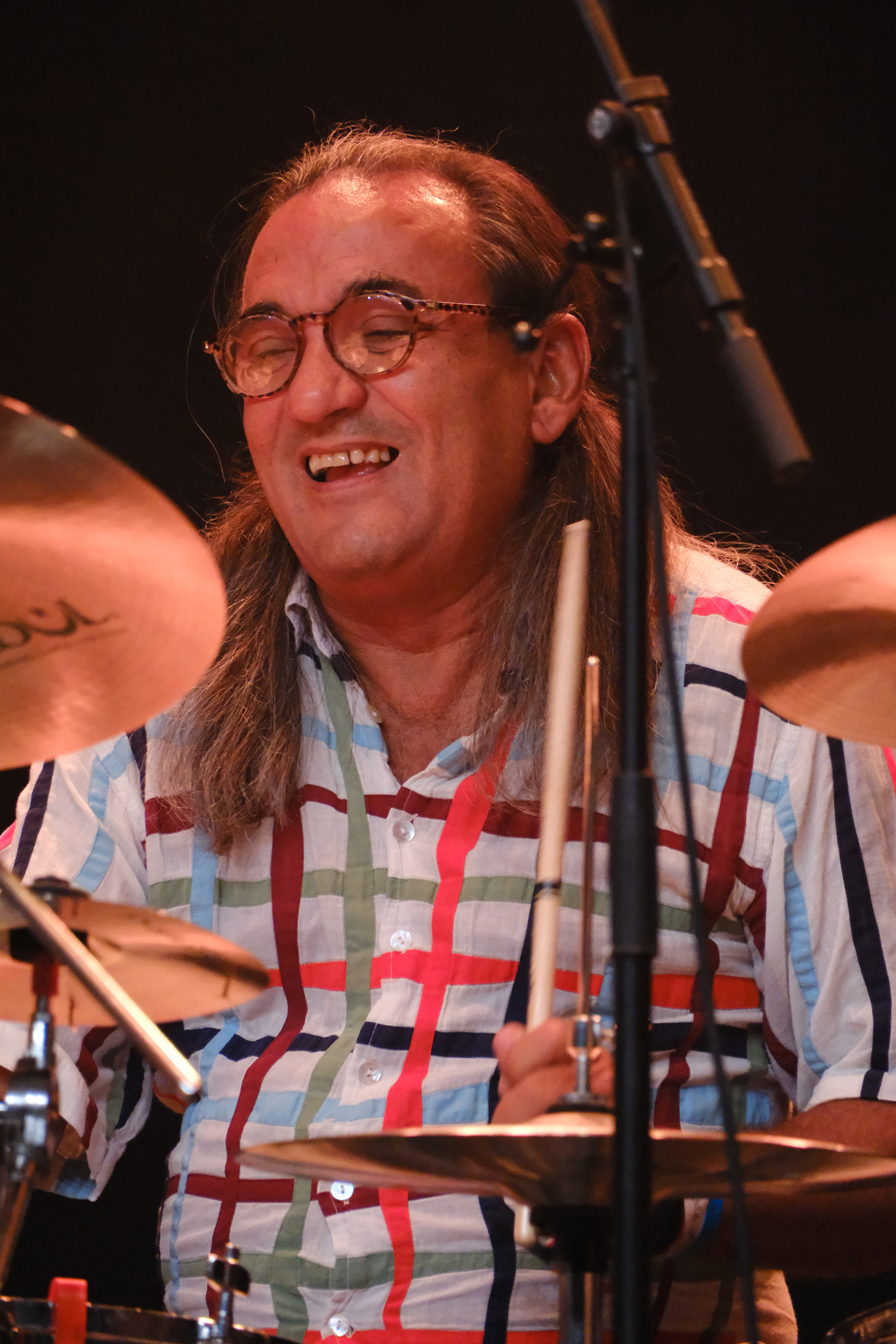
- Hernández at Istanbul Jazz Festival in 2025

Background information
- Born: 24 April 1963 (age 62); Havana, Cuba
- Genres: Latin jazz, Latin rock
- Occupation: Musician
- Instrument(s): Drums, percussion
- Years active: 1978–present

Horacio "El Negro" Hernández (born April 24, 1963) is a Cuban drummer and percussionist. He has played alongside Latin jazz pianists such as Gonzalo Rubalcaba, Michel Camilo, Chucho Valdés, Eddie Palmieri and Hilario Durán.

== Career ==
"El Negro" follows the influences from Arturo Sandoval, Paquito D'Rivera, Ignacio Berroa, and others. His drumming reflects a musical heritage rooted in folklore tradition.

"El Negro" first gained international recognition as the drummer for the pianist Gonzalo Rubalcaba and his group Proyecto. Since leaving Cuba in 1990, Hernandez has played in the U.S. with many different pop, rock, jazz and Latin jazz acts, including on many albums, some of which have received Grammy awards, including Roy Hargrove's Havana (1997), Carlos Santana's Supernatural (1999), Alejandro Sanz' No es lo mismo (2003) and Eddie Palmieri's Listen Here (2005). Hernández owns a Grammy award for the 2001 Latin Jazz album Live at the Blue Note with Michel Camilo (piano) and Charles Flores (bass). Since 2004, Hernandez has recorded and toured with his own band, Italuba.

In July 2010, Hernández was awarded an Honorary Doctorate of Music from Berklee College of Music. He was presented with the award at the Umbria Jazz Festival in Perugia, Italy by Berklee's former Vice President of Academic Affairs, Larry Monroe.

In 2011 he recorded the album Proposición, with a band including Dany Noel Martinez, Giovanni Hidalgo, Ivan Lewis, Dario Chiazzolino, Ivan Bridon and Amik Guerra. In the same year he played at the Modern Drummer Festival with his new band The New World Order; the concert was released on the Modern Drummer Festival 2011 DVD. Also in 2011 he began playing with Marc Ribot y Los Cubanos Postizos.

In 2016 Hernández joined Salazh Trio, a jazz fusion group featuring bassist Jeroen Paul Thesseling. Their debut work Circulations was released in December 2017.

== Discography ==
- Robby and Negro at the Third World War with Robby Ameen (American Clave, 2002)
- Onto the Street (EWE, 2003)
- Italuba (Pimienta, 2004)

=== As sideman ===
With Fahir Atakoglu

- If (Far & Here, 2005)
- Live at Umbria Jazz (Far & Here, 2005)
- Istanbul in Blue (Far & Here, 2007)
- Faces & Places (Far & Here, 2009)

With Jack Bruce

- Shadows in the Air (Sanctuary, 2001)
- More Jack Than God (Sanctuary, 2003)
- Live at the Canterbury Fayre (Classic Rock Legends 2003)
- Live at the MilkyWay 2001 (Flaccid Parrot 2010)

With Michel Camilo

- Thru My Eyes (TropiJazz, 1997)
- Live at the Blue Note (Telarc, 2003)
- Triangulo (Telarc, 2002)

With Hilario Durán

- Habana Nocturna (Justin Time, 1999)
- From the Heart (Alma, 2006)
- Contumbao (Alma, 2017)

With Kip Hanrahan

- A Thousand Nights and a Night (1-Red Nights) (American Clave, 1996)
- A Thousand Nights and a Night (Shadow Night 1) (Justin Time, 1998)
- A Thousand Nights and a Night (Shadow Night 2) (American Clave, 1999)
- Original Music from the Soundtrack of Pinero (American Clave, 2002)
- Beautiful Scars (American Clave, 2008)

With Gonzalo Rubalcaba

- La Nueva Cubana (Areito, 1985)
- Live in Havanna Volume 1 (Messidor, 1986)
- Concatenacion Vol 2 (Melopea Discos, 1988)
- Mi Gran Pasion (Messidor, 1988)
- Giraldilla (Messidor, 1990)
- Concatenacion (Melopea Discos, 1993)
- Live in Havana (DiscMedi Blau, 1994)

With Kazumi Watanabe

- Mo' Bop (EWE, 2003)
- Mo' Bop II (EWE, 2004)
- Mo' Bop III (EWE, 2006)
- Tricoroll (EWE, 2011)

With others

- Gabriela Anders, Cool Again (Evj!, 2015)
- Luis Bonilla, Escucha! (Candid/Artists Only!, 2000)
- Joanne Brackeen, Pink Elephant Magic (Arkadia Jazz, 1999)
- Concha Buika, Mi Nina Lola (Atlantic, 2006)
- Gary Burton, for Hamp, Red, Bags, and Cal (Concord Jazz, 2001)
- Camille, I Sing Stevie (Camilleon, 2014)
- Lorenzo Cherubini, Buon Sangue (Universal, Soleluna, Mercury 2018)
- Paquito D'Rivera, A Night in Englewood (Messidor, 1994)
- Santi Debriano, Circlechant (HighNote, 1999)
- Evelyn Glennie, Touch the Sound (Normal, 2004)
- Burcu Gunes, Tilsim (Erol Kose, 2001)
- Roy Hargrove, Habana (Verve, 1997)
- Los Hombres Calientes, Vol. 3: New Congo Square (Basin Street, 2001)
- Los Hombres Calientes, Vol. 4: Vodou Dance (Basin Street, 2003)
- Joachim Kuhn, Universal Time (EmArcy, 2002)
- Uli Lenz, Rainmaker's Dance (Arkadia Jazz, 2001)
- Hector Martignon, Refugee (Zoho, 2007)
- Per Mathisen & Jan Gunnar Hoff with Horacio Hernandez, Barxeta II (Losen, 2018)
- Rebeca Mauleon, Round Trip (Bembe, 1999)
- Enrique Morente, El Pequeno Reloj (Virgin/EMI, 2003)
- Michael Philip Mossman, The Orisha Suite (Connector Music, 2001)
- Brenda Navarrete, Mi Mundo (Alma Records, 2018)
- Arturo O'Farrill, Blood Lines (Milestone, 1999)
- Chico O'Farrill, Heart of a Legend (Milestone, 1999)
- Chico O'Farrill, Carambola (Milestone, 2000)
- Eddie Palmieri, Listen Here! (Concord Picante, 2005)
- John Patitucci, Imprint (Concord Jazz, 2000)
- Jose Luis Perales, Navegando Por Ti (Sony BMG/Columbia, 2006)
- Tito Puente, Jazzin (TropiJazz, 1996)
- Dave Samuels, Tjaderized: A Cal Tjader Tribute (Verve, 1998)
- David Sanchez, Street Scenes (Columbia, 1996)
- Santana, Supernatural (Arista/BMG 1999)
- Alejandro Sanz, No Es Lo Mismo (WEA, 2006)
- Edward Simon, Beauty Within (AudioQuest, 1994)
- Esperanza Spalding, Esperanza (Heads Up, 2008)
- TOKYO ZAWINUL BACH b/w Horacio "El Negro" Hernandez, VOGUE AFRICA (East Works Entertainment, 2003)
- TOKYO ZAWINUL BACH, VOGUE AFRICA "Naked" (East Works Entertainment, 2006)
- Juan Pablo Torres, Together Again (Pimenta, 2002)
- Ana Torroja, Pasajes De Un Sueno (Ariola/BMG, 2000)
- Steve Turre, Steve Turre (Verve, 1997)
- Steve Turre, In the Spur of the Moment (Telarc, 2000)
- Chucho Valdes, Live (RMM, 1998)
- Manuel Valera, Forma Nueva (Mavo, 2004)
- Yerba Buena, President Alien (Razor & Tie, 2003)
- Zucchero, La Sesion Cubana (Universal, 2012)
