= Thru My Eyes =

Studio album by Michel Camilo
- Released: February 11, 1997
- Genre: Latin jazz
- Label: Columbia
- Producer: Michel Camilo

Michel Camilo chronology
Hands of Rhythm (1997)	Thru My Eyes (1997)	Spain (2000)

Professional ratings
Review scores
Source	Rating
Larry Birnbaum	

Thru My Eyes is a studio album by Michel Camilo released in 1997 by Columbia Records.

== Track listing ==
1. "Poinciana" (Nat Simon, Buddy Bernier)
2. "Perdido" (H. J. Lengsfelder, Juan Tizol, Erwin Drake)
3. "Watermelon Man" (Herbie Hancock)
4. "A Night in Tunisia" (Dizzy Gillespie, Frank Paparelli)
5. "Song for My Father" (Horace Silver)
6. "Armando's Rhumba" (Chick Corea)
7. "St. Thomas" (Sonny Rollins)
8. "Oye Como Va" (Tito Puente)
9. "Afro-Blue" (Mongo Santamaria)
10. "Mambo Inn" (Mario Bauza)
11. "My Little Suede Shoes" (Charlie Parker)
12. "Manteca" (Gillespie, Luciano "Chano" Pozo, W. Fuller)

== Personnel ==
- Michel Camilo – piano
- Anthony Jackson – bass
- Lincoln Goines – bass
- John Patitucci – bass
- Cliff Almond – drums
- Horacio Hernández – drums
