= Same Height Relation =

Studio album by Hector On Stilts
- Released: 2005
- Label: Independent
- Producer: Andres Levin

Hector On Stilts chronology
hectoronstiltsEP (2002)	Same Height Relation (2005)

Same Height Relation is the second album by American band Hector On Stilts, released in 2005.

== Track listing ==
1. Taxi
2. Heart in Your Hand
3. La Dee Da
4. Mom's in Love Again
5. Winterland
6. Tongue-tied
7. Annie
8. Rhyme Like Me
9. Squares Into Circles
10. Same Height Relation
11. Soul So Sweet
12. Take One, Bobby
