= Michel Camilo (album) =

Studio album by Michel Camilo
- Released: 1988
- Recorded: January–February 1988
- Genre: Latin jazz
- Label: CBS Portrait
- Producer: Michel Camilo

Michel Camilo chronology
Suntan/In Trio (1986)	Michel Camilo (1988)	On Fire (1989)

Professional ratings
Review scores
Source	Rating
The Penguin Guide to Jazz Recordings	3/4 stars

Michel Camilo is an album by pianist Michel Camilo. The album was recorded in January and February 1988 and released by CBS Portrait.

== Track listing ==
1. Suite Sandrine, Pt. 1
2. Nostalgia
3. Dreamlight
4. Crossroads
5. Sunset (Interlude I/Suite Sandrine)
6. Yarey
7. Pra Voce (For Tania Maria)
8. Blue Bossa
9. Caribe

== Personnel ==
- Michel Camilo – piano
- Marc Johnson – bass
- Lincoln Goines – bass
- Joel Rosenblatt – drums
- Dave Weckl – drums
- Mongo Santamaría – conga
