= On Fire (Michel Camilo album) =

Studio album by Michel Camilo
- Released: 1989
- Recorded: June 20–25, 1989
- Studios: Clinton Recording Studios, NYC
- Genre: Latin jazz
- Producer: Michel Camilo

Michel Camilo chronology
Michel Camilo (1988)	On Fire (1989)	On the Other Hand (1990)

Professional ratings
Review scores
Source	Rating
The Penguin Guide to Jazz Recordings	3.5/4 stars

On Fire is a studio album of Latin jazz music, mostly by the Dominican composer Michel Camilo. It was released in 1989.

== Track listing ==
1. "Island Stomp" (Michel Camilo)
2. "If You Knew..." (Michel Camilo)
3. "Uptown Manhattan" (Michel Camilo)
4. "Friends (Interlude II/Suite Sandrine)" (Michel Camilo)
5. "Hands and Feet" (Michel Camilo)
6. "This Way Out" (Michel Camilo)
7. "In Love" (Michel Camilo)
8. "And Sammy Walked In" (Michel Camilo)
9. "Softly, As in a Morning Sunrise" (Oscar Hammerstein II; Sigmund Romberg)
10. "On Fire" (Michel Camilo)

== Personnel ==
- Michel Camilo – piano
- Marc Johnson – bass
- Marvin "Smitty" Smith – drums
- Michael Bowie – bass
- Sammy Figueroa – conga
- Joel Rosenblatt – drums
- Dave Weckl – drums
