= Chiara Civello =

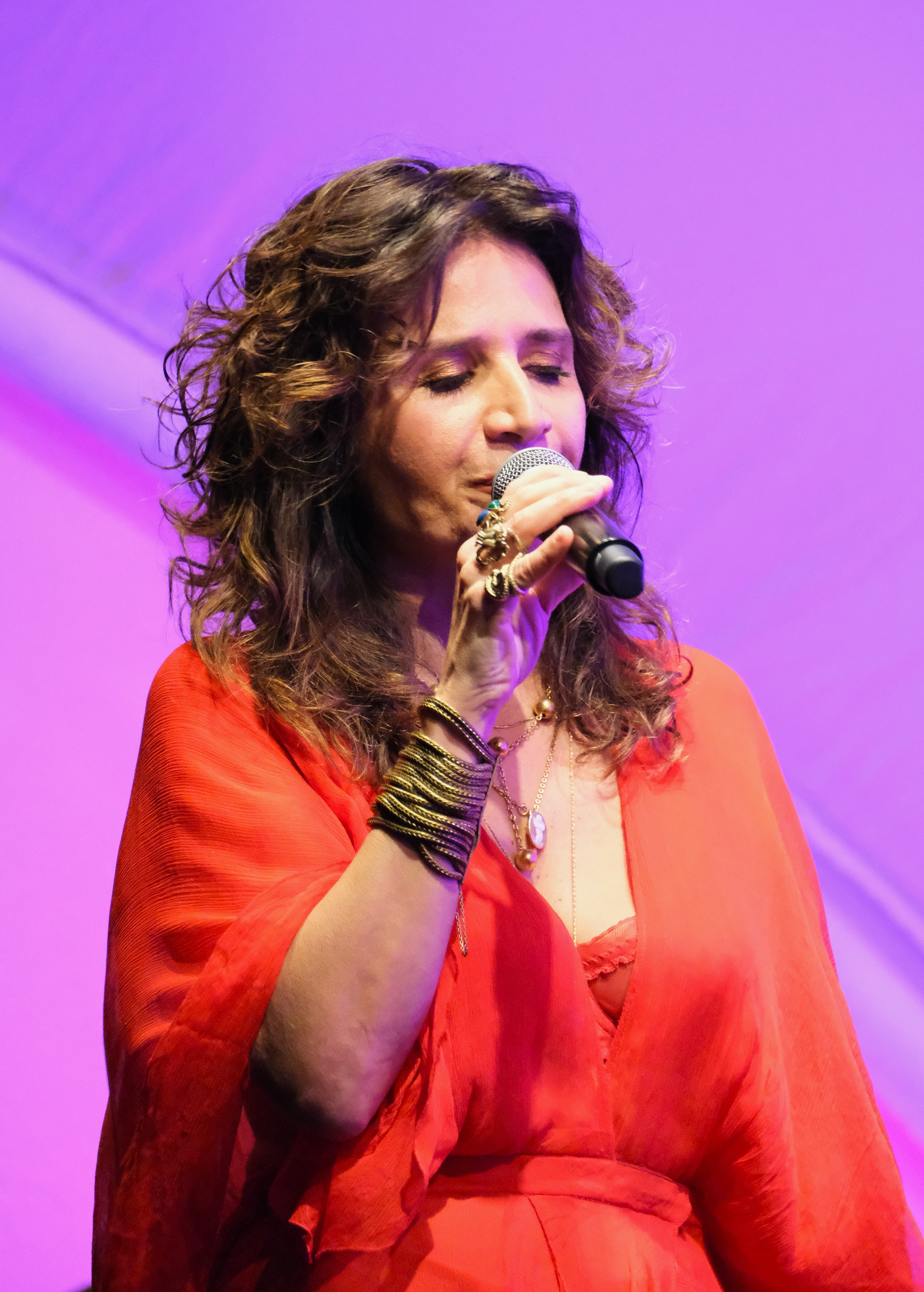
- Civello at Istanbul Jazz Festival, 2025

Background information
- Born: 15 June 1975 (age 50); Rome, Italy
- Genres: Jazz, pop
- Occupations: Vocalist, musician
- Instruments: Vocals, piano, guitar
- Years active: 1992–present
- Labels: Verve, Sony
- Website: chiaracivello.com

Chiara Civello (born 15 June 1975) is an Italian singer, songwriter, pianist, and guitarist.

== Career ==
When Civello was seventeen, she sang in a band with Mario Raja, then Roberto Gatto. On a scholarship, she moved to Boston in 1994 to attend the Berklee College of Music. After graduating, she moved to New York City and met Russ Titelman, who produced her first album. The album was influenced by Brazilian music, with vocals by Daniel Jobim, the grandson of Antonio Carlos Jobim, and cover versions of "Outono" by Rosa Passos and "Caramel" by Suzanne Vega. Civello wrote one song, "Trouble", with Burt Bacharach. She was accompanied by Steve Gadd, Larry Goldings, Jamey Haddad, Mike Mainieri, Rob Mounsey, Adam Rogers, and Ben Street.

The second album, The Space Between (Universal Jazz and Classics, 2007) was produced by Steve Addabbo and Pete Rende. It contained original songs and songs written with guitarist Jim Campilongo. The title of her third album, 7752 (Universal Jazz and Classics, 2010), produced by Andres Levin, refers to the distance in kilometers between New York and Rio de Janeiro. After a short visit to Daniel Jobim in Rio in 2008, collaborations with other artists encouraged her to explore Brazilian music. Brazilian singer Ana Carolina was the main collaborator on this album. Their first composition together, "Resta", was on the soundtrack for the soap opera Passione, produced by GLOBO TV. The album included Jaques Morelenbaum, Tom Jobim, Caetano Veloso, Gilberto Gil, Ryuichi Sakamoto, Marc Ribot, Mauro Refosco, and Anat Cohen.

In 2012 Civello took part in the Sanremo Festival with a song written with Diana Tejera which gave the title to her fourth album, Al Posto Del Mondo. The song "Problemi/Problemas" interpreted by Ana Carolina, on the soundtrack of the soap opera Fina Estampa, won the Premio Multishow prize for best song of 2012 in Brazil.

On Canzoni (Sony, 2014) Civello became a torch singer and immersed herself in the Italian repertoire: an album of love songs carefully picked from the 60s to the present, blending influences of bossa nova, blue-eyed soul, jazz, and pop.

Gilberto Gil, Chico Buarque, Ana Carolina Esperanza Spalding sang duets on "Io che non vivo senza te" (Gil) "Io che amo solo te" (Chico Biarque) "E penso a te" (Ana Carolina) and an Italian version of "The Windmills of Your Mind" (Esperanza Spalding). The orchestral arrangements were conceived by Eumir Deodato. Nicola Conte provided a blend of contemporary sensibility and old school analog sound.

On Eclipse Civello's music acquired a new flavor thanks to the production of Marc Collin (aka Nouvelle Vague) who found a balance between classic and modern sound by blending Brazilian music, excerpts from Italian cinema, and subliminal electronics.

Civello has written and sung in five languages: Italian, English, Spanish, French, and Portuguese. She sang duets with James Taylor (on the album October Road), Juan Luis Guerra (on the album La llave de mi corazon), Pino Daniele (on the album Ricomincio da 30).

== Discography ==
Album Title	Album details	Peak chart positions
Album Title	Album details	Italy
Last Quarter Moon	Released: 2005; Label: Verve; Format: CD, download digital	62
The Space Between	Released: 2007; Label: Universal Music; Format: CD, download digital	38
7752	Released: 2010; Label: EmArcy; Format: CD, download digital	51
Al Posto del Mondo	Released: 2012; Label: Sony; Format: CD, download digital	57
Canzoni	Released: 2014; Label: Sony; Format: CD, download digital	16
Eclipse	Released: 2017; Label: Sony; Format: CD, download digital	12
Chansons	Released: 2021; Label: Kwaidan Records; Format: CD, Vinyl, download digital	
