= Why Not? (Michel Camilo album) =

Studio album by Michel Camilo
- Released: 1985
- Recorded: February 1985
- Genre: Jazz, Latin, Latin jazz
- Label: Electric Bird
- Producer: Michel Camilo

Michel Camilo chronology
Why Not? (1985)	Suntan/In Trio (1986)

Professional ratings
Review scores
Source	Rating
AllMusic	2.5/5 stars
The Penguin Guide to Jazz Recordings	3/4 stars

Why not? is an album by Michel Camilo, released in 1985.

== Recording and music ==
The album was recorded in February 1985. It was Camilo's first album as a leader.

The album was released by Electric Bird. The AllMusic reviewer commented that Camilo sounded too eager to display what he could do: "His intensity and energy were impressive, but at times he tried too much and stumbled getting back to the melody... It wasn't an unflawed debut, but Camilo showed that he would be a pianist to be reckoned with down the line."

== Track listing ==
1. "Just Kiddin'" (Camilo)
2. "Hello and Goodbye" (Camilo)
3. "Thinking of You" (Camilo)
4. "Why Not?" (Camilo)
5. "Not Yet" (Camilo)
6. "Suite Sandrine, Pt. 5" (Camilo)

== Personnel ==
- Michel Camilo – piano
- Anthony Jackson – bass
- Dave Weckl – drums
- Lew Soloff –trumpet
- Chris Hunter – tenor saxophone, alto saxophone
- Guarionex Aquino – percussion
- Sammy Figueroa – percussion
