= 7752 =

Studio album by Chiara Civello
- Released: May 25, 2010
- Recorded: 2010
- Genre: Vocal jazz, pop
- Length: 41:08
- Label: EmArcy
- Producer: Sonia Martyres

Chiara Civello chronology
The Space Between (2007)	7752 (2010)	Al Posto del Mondo (2012)

7752 is the third album by Italian jazz vocalist Chiara Civello. The title gives the distance in kilometers from New York City to Rio de Janeiro, the two cities that inspired the album.

== Background ==
While visiting her friend, Daniel Jobim, in Rio in February 2008, Civello was taken to a party where artists and musicians of all kinds get together. The guitar went around and everyone sang a song. As Civello shared, listened and learned, a new phase of her artistic path began. Ana Carolina, a Brazilian MPB star, is one of the main collaborators of 7752. Not only did she co-write five of the songs with Civello, but she also played acoustic guitar on most of them.

Written between Rio, New York, and Rome, 7752 includes ten musical moments of which eight were recorded in New York City (and produced by the eclectic producer Andres Levin), while four were recorded in Rio and produced by Civello.

== Track listing ==
No.	Title	Writer(s)	Length
1.	"8 Storie"	Ana Carolina/Chiara Civello	4:05
2.	"My Somewhere to Go"	Civello/Itaal Shur	4:17
3.	"I Didn't Want"	Carolina/Civello	4:03
4.	"Dimmi Perche"	Carolina/Civello	3:55
5.	"Un Duomo Che Non Sa Dire Addio"	Civello/Stefano Scandaletti/Totonho Villeroy	2:48
6.	"One More Thing"	Civello	4:47
7.	"Sófa'"	Carolina/Civello/Diana Tejera	3:02
8.	"Resta"	Carolina/Civell/Dulce Quental	5:22
9.	"I'm Your Love"	Civello	4:18
10.	"Non Avevo Capito Niente"	Civello	4:18

== Personnel ==
- Chiara Civello – vocals, guitar, keyboards, programming, arranger
- Ana Carolina – vocals, guitar, cajon, programming, arranger
- Andres Levin – guitar, keyboards, programming, arranger
- Raymond Angry – keyboards
- Anat Cohen – clarinet, bass clarinet, saxophone
- Michael Leonhart – trumpet, horn arrangements
- Marc Ribot – guitar
- Guilherme Monteiro – guitar
- Diana Tejera – guitar
- Alberto Continentino – bass
- Jonathan Maron – bass
- Gene Lake – drums
- Domenico Lancellotti – drums
- Mauro Refosco – percussion
- Yusuke Yamamoto – bongos
- Marcio Eymard Malard – cello
- Jacques Morelembaum – cello, string arrangements
- Paulo Santoro – cello
- Bernardo Bessler – violin
- José Alves Da Silva – violin
- Glauco Fernandes – violin
- Carlos Eduardo Hack – violin
- Carlos Mendes – violin
- Pedro Mibielli – violin
- Leo Fabricio Ortiz – violin
- Osvaldo Luís Teodoro – violin
- Jesuina Noronha Passaroto – viola
- Maria Christine Springuel – viola

Production

- Chiara Civello – producer
- Ana Carolina – producer
- Andres Levin – producer
- Bob Power – mixing
- Sonia Martyres – producer

== See also ==
- La Llave de Mi Corazón - Juan Luis Guerra
