= Rosas del Amor =

Studio album by Tomatito
- Released: 1987
- Genre: Flamenco, Gypsy jazz
- Length: 30:54
- Label: EMI

Rosas del Amor is a 1987 flamenco album, the debut solo album of Spanish guitarist Tomatito. Note the album art and tracklist running order shown is from the 1997 CD reissue on Hispavox / EMI 100 and different from the original Hispavox 1987 LP release.

== Track listing ==
1. Dedicado a Camarón (3:52)
2. La Chanca (4:03)
3. Rosas del Amor (4:04)
4. La Andonda (3:08)
5. Puerta de Sevilla (3:18)
6. Barrio Santiago (3:47)
7. Alejandría (4:09)
8. Soledad (4:33)

== Reception ==
Richard Nidel considers Rosas del Amor to be an "important, groundbreaking CD." Stewart Mason of Allmusic says of it, "Rosas del Amor is a legendary album in modern flamenco music; it wouldn't be far off to call it the Spanish folk guitar equivalent of Sgt. Pepper's Lonely Hearts Club Band. Rosas del Amor takes traditional flamenco music and injects liberal amounts of jazz influence, specifically the French gypsy-influenced jazz of Django Reinhardt and Stephane Grappelli. The resulting intermingling of styles works beautifully, as the two forms of music (not as far apart as one might initially think) blend harmoniously into a fully realized, richly textured whole."
