= Tomatito =

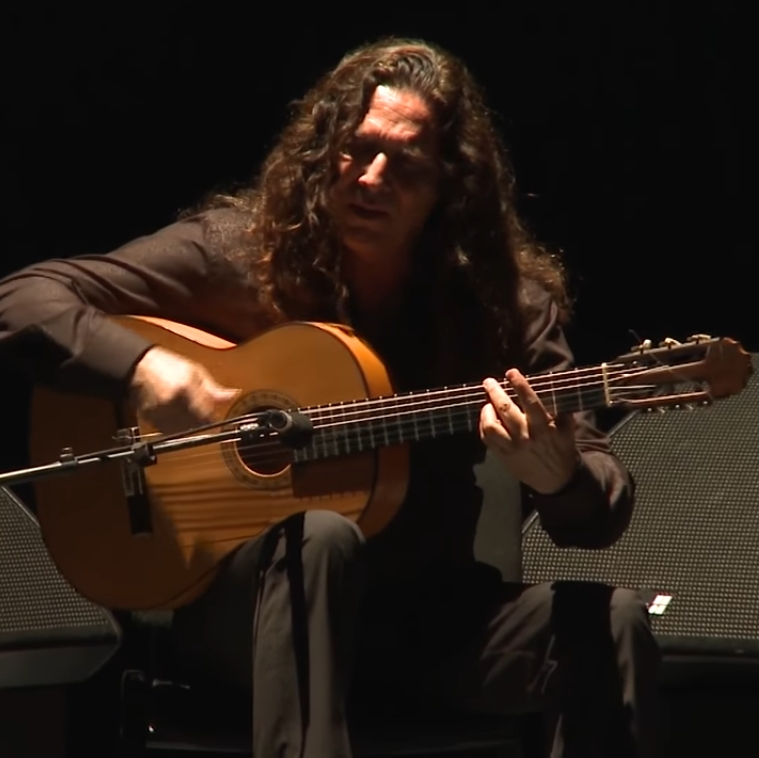
- Tomatito in Alhóndiga de Granaditas in 2016

Background information
- Also known as: Tomatito
- Born: José Fernández Torres; August 20, 1958 (age 68)
- Origin: Fondón, Almería
- Genres: Flamenco; jazz
- Occupations: Musician; composer
- Instrument: Flamenco guitar
- Years active: 1980s-present

José Fernández Torres (born Fondón, 1958), known professionally as Tomatito, is a Spanish Roma flamenco guitarist and composer. Having started his career accompanying famed flamenco singer Camarón de la Isla (with Paco de Lucía), he has made a number of collaborative albums and six solo albums, two of which have won Latin Grammy Awards.

== Biography ==
=== Beginnings, Camarón de la Isla ===
Jose Fernández Torres grew up in a musical family, which included two guitar playing uncles: Niño Miguel, a flamenco guitarist, and Antonio, a professional guitarist.

Tomatito, who had been playing clubs in Andalucía, became a flamenco sensation when he was discovered by guitarist Paco de Lucía. He accompanied legendary flamenco singer Camarón de la Isla for two decades. With Paco and Camarón he recorded four albums, and had a 1979 hit called "La Leyenda del Tiempo". Their album Paris 87 won a Latin Grammy for best flamenco album in 2000. Their partnership continued until Camarón's death in 1992.

=== Later career ===
Tomatito's music blends traditional flamenco and jazz. On some albums, such as Barrio Negro, he experimented with Afro-Cuban and Brazilian Music. He has also worked with flamenco singers Duquende and Potito and pianist Chano Domínguez, among others. A collaboration with pianist Michel Camilo produced the albums Spain (2000), which won a Latin Grammy, and Spain Again (2006).

Tomatito has produced six solo albums. His 2005 album Aguadulce won a Latin Grammy for best flamenco album, and in 2010 he won his second solo Latin Grammy for Sonanta Suite.

His music for the film Vengo, directed by Tony Gatlif, won the César Award for Best Music Written for a Film in 2001.

On March 11, 2019, he was awarded by the Premio Flamenco Radio of Canal Sur.

== Style and instruments ==
Tomatito incorporates elements of jazz in his style of flamenco; both, he says, "emerged as a response to discrimination, a cry of suffering, or the joy of liberation". Half of what he plays is improvised, he said. He frequently employs the Phrygian mode, and his favorite tuning is D, A, D, G, B♭, D.

He plays guitars made by Manuel Reyes, and uses (and endorses) strings by Savarez.

== Discography ==
=== Solo albums ===
- 1987: Rosas del Amor
- 1991: Barrio Negro
- 1997: Guitarra Gitana
- 2000: Spain (with Michel Camilo)
- 2001: Paseo de los Castaños
- 2004: Aguadulce
- 2006: Spain Again (with Michel Camilo)
- 2008: Pansequito
- 2010: Sonanta Suite (with Josep Pons and the Orquesta Nacional de España)
- 2013: Soy Flamenco
- 2016: Spain Forever (with Michel Camilo)
- 2019: Rodrigo: Concierto De Aranjuez

==== Singles ====
- 2012: "Mi Santa" Ft Romeo

=== With Camarón de la Isla and Paco de Lucía ===
- 1981: "Como El Agua"
- 1983: "Calle Real"
- 1984: "Vivire"
- 1992: "Potro de Rabia y Miel"

=== With Camarón de la Isla ===
- 1979: "La Leyenda del Tiempo"
- 1986: "Te lo Dice Camarón"
- 1987: "Flamenco Vivo"
- 1989: "Soy Gitano"
- 1994: "Camarón Nuestro"
- 1999: Paris 1987
