= Live at the Blue Note (Michel Camilo album) =

Live album by Michel Camilo
- Released: August 26, 2003
- Recorded: March 19–22, 2003
- Genre: Jazz
- Label: Telarc
- Producer: Michel Camilo

Michel Camilo chronology
Triangulo (2002)	Live at the Blue Note (2003)	Solo (2005)

Professional ratings
Review scores
Source	Rating
The Penguin Guide to Jazz Recordings	3/4 stars

Live at the Blue Note is an album released by Michel Camilo on August 26, 2003. It was recorded at the Blue Note club in New York City in March 2003. Camilo, with Charles Flores, Horacio "El Negro" Hernández and Robert Friedrich, were awarded the Grammy Award for Best Latin Jazz Album for this release.

== Track listing ==
The track listing from Allmusic.

=== Disc 1 ===
No.	Title	Writer(s)	Length
1.	"Cocowalk"	Michel Camilo	6:12
2.	"Two of a Kind"	Camilo	6:53
3.	"Hello & Goodbye"	Camilo	8:42
4.	"The Magic in You"	Camilo	9:02
5.	"Tequila Rio"	Chuck Rio	4:50
6.	"Dichotomy"	Camilo	7:58
7.	"Twilight Glow"	Camilo	8:43
8.	"Happy Birthday/Blue Bossa"	Kenny Dorham, Mildred J. Hill, Patty Smith Hill	3:53
9.	"This Way Out"	Camilo	10:56

=== Disc 2 ===
No.	Title	Writer(s)	Length
1.	"On the Other Hand"	Camilo	6:42
2.	"Mongo's Blues"	Camilo	6:52
3.	"Thinking of You"	Camilo	9:09
4.	"At Night (To Frank)"	Camilo	6:14
5.	"Why Not!"	Camilo	8:26
6.	"Silent Talk"	Camilo	6:29
7.	"See You Later"	Camilo	6:22
8.	"And Sammy Walked In"	Camilo	6:35
9.	"On Fire"	Camilo	13:02
