= Yerba Buena (band) =

Latin fusion band

- Genres: Latin, dance
- Members: Alfredo de la Fé; Andres Levin; Cucu Diamantes; Panagiotis Andreu; Pedrito Martinez; Skoota Warner; Terreon Gully; Xiomara Laugart

Yerba Buena was a Latin fusion band. The group, active between 2003 and 2009, was founded by Venezuelan musician and producer Andres Levin.

Yerba Buena's music (as described by Razor & Tie, the band's record label) is a blend of Latin music (Cuban rumba, Colombian cumbia, Pan-Caribbean Soca, and Cuban Boogaloo) with hip-hop, Motown, soul, Afrobeat, and a dash of Middle Eastern themes.

Before the release of their album President Alien, Yerba Buena collaborated with Me'Shell NdegéOcello on a track titled "Gentleman" for the Red Hot Organization's tribute compilation album for Fela Kuti, Red Hot and Riot. They also appeared on a track called "Colonial Mentality" for the album. The Paul Heck produced album was critically acclaimed and donated its proceeds to various AIDS charities.

Band members included Cucu Diamantes (vocals), El Chino (vocals), Xiomara Laugart (vocals), Divine RBG (rapper), Rashawn Ross (trumpet), Ron Blake (reeds), Sebastian Steinberg (bass), Pedrito Martinez (percussion), Terreon Gully (drums), Horacio Hernandez (drums)

== President Alien ==
The band's debut album, President Alien, was released on April 15, 2003. For the recording of the album, Levin and Diamantes invited several colleagues with whom he had collaborated in the past, including:

- singer & songwriter Descemer Bueno;
- singer & songwriter Divine RBG;
- singer Cucu Diamantes;
- singer Xiomara Laugart;
- singer Pedrito Martinez;
- singer El Chino;
- singer/bassist Meshell Ndegeocello;
- Brazilian singer-songwriter and percussionist Carlinhos Brown;
- guitarist Andres Levin;
- guitarist Marc Ribot;
- keyboardist Money Mark;
- jazz trumpeter Roy Hargrove;
- rapper Stic.man;
- drummers Horacio Hernandez and Terreon Gully;
- bassist Sebastian Steinberg

In 2004, the album was nominated for the Best Latin Rock/Alternative Album Grammy Award.

The popularity of the band has taken the group to play at multiple summer festivals such as Central Park Summerstage, The Hollywood Bowl, The Newport Jazz Festival, Montreal's Nuits D'Afrique and Tempo Latino in France.

Ben Ratliff of The New York Times has described Yerba Buena as "one of New York's best new dance bands, mixing up the Latin boogaloo of the 60's, Cuban religious music, some American soul and Fela-like Afrobeat. It's a history of the transmission of Yoruban culture in a nutshell, and it's a good party."

Since Island Life, both Diamantes and Laugart recorded solo albums, with both artists veering closer to traditional Cuban music.

== Current members ==
- Andres Levin – guitar, electronics
- Cucu Diamantes – vocals
- Pedrito Martinez – percussion, vocals
- Skoota Warner – drums
- Ron Blake – saxophone, flute, vocals
- Alfredo de la Fé – violin
- Mauricio Herrera – percussion
