= Michel Camilo =

Dominican pianist and composer (born 1954)

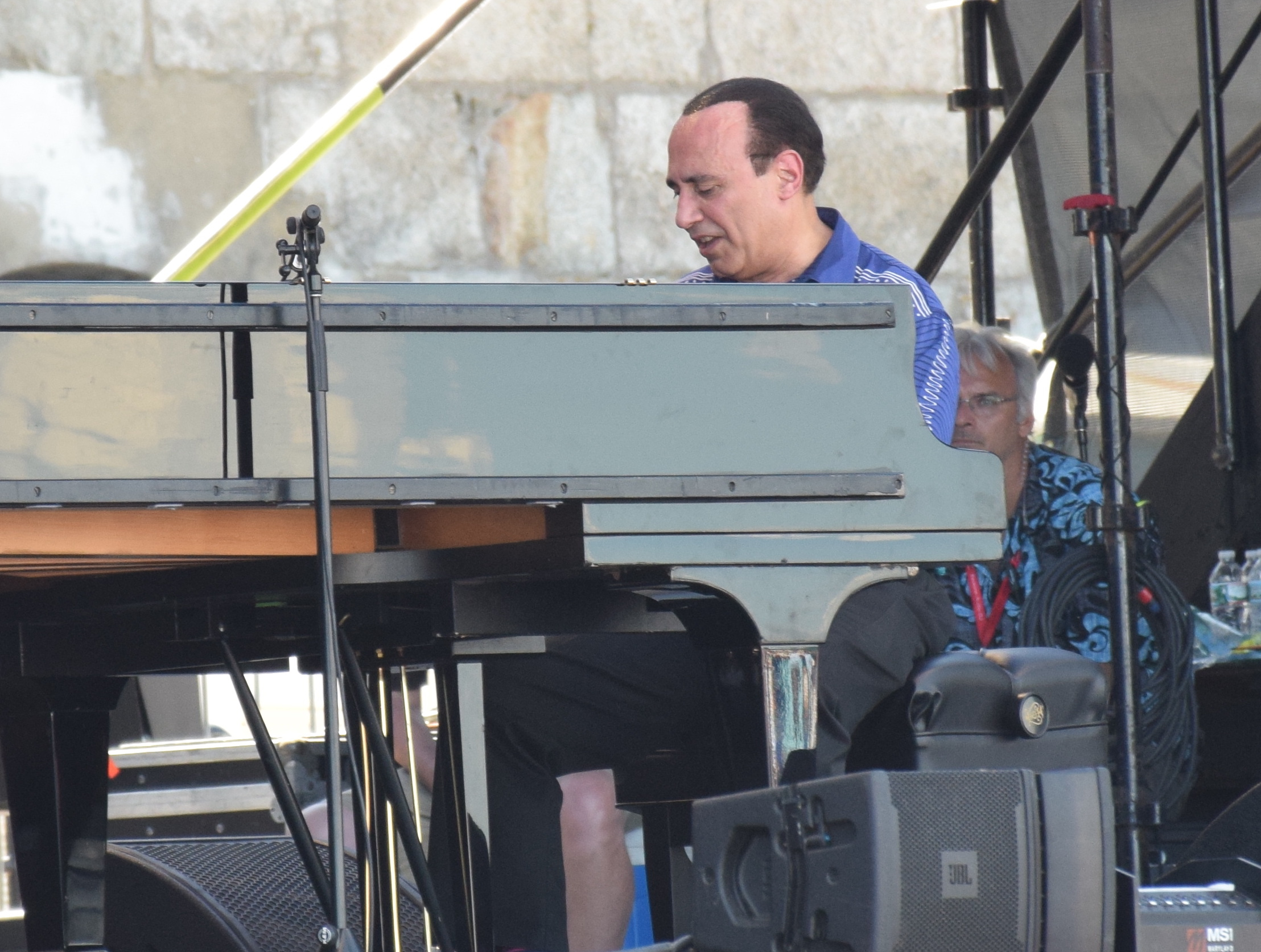
- Camilo in concert (2015)

Background information
- Born: April 4, 1954 (age 72); Santo Domingo, Dominican Republic
- Genres: Jazz, Latin, classical
- Occupation: Musician
- Instrument: Piano
- Years active: 1970s–present
- Website: www.michelcamilo.com

Michel Camilo (born April 4, 1954) is a Dominican pianist and composer. He specializes in jazz, Latin and classical piano work.

== Background and career ==
Camilo was born into a musical family and as a young child showed aptitude for the accordion that his parents gave him. Although he enjoyed the accordion, it was his grandparents' piano that sparked his interest the most, so at the age of 9 he asked his parents to buy him one. Their response was to first send him to the Elementary Music School, part of the National Conservatory, and then a year later to grant his wish.

The formal system of the music school taught Camilo to play in the classical style, and by age 16 he was playing with the National Symphony Orchestra of the Dominican Republic. Camilo comments on his first encounter with the sounds of jazz, in an interview with the All About Jazz website:

"The first time I heard jazz was when I was 14 and a half. I heard the great Art Tatum on the radio playing his solo piano rendition of 'Tea for Two.' That immediately caught my ear. I just wanted to soak it in, to learn to play that style. Then I found out it was jazz."

Camilo studied for 13 years at the National Conservatory, and whilst developing his strong classical abilities was also heavily influenced by the bebop tradition, and by the contemporary jazz of Herbie Hancock, Keith Jarrett, Chick Corea and Amilton Godoy (Zimbo Trio's pianist). His influences at this time also included Horace Silver, Erroll Garner, and the ragtime music of Scott Joplin.

When the Harvard University Jazz Band visited the Dominican Republic and heard Camilo at a jam session, the bandleader encouraged him, 'You should be in the States', and so the idea was planted. In 1979, Camilo moved to New York to study at Mannes College and at The Juilliard School, and broke onto the international stage in 1983 when Tito Puente's pianist was unable to make a concert at the Montreal Jazz Festival. On a recommendation, without hearing him, Puente asked Camilo to play. Cuban reedman Paquito D'Rivera was in the audience and offered him a place in his band. For four years, Camilo toured internationally with D'Rivera and recorded two albums with him.

Camilo's emergence as a star in his own right began around 1985, the year he debuted with his trio at Carnegie Hall. In that same year he toured Europe with Paquito D’Rivera's quintet, and recorded his first album, Why Not?, for Japan's King label. His album Suntan/In Trio had a trio with Anthony Jackson on the bass and Dave Weckl on the drums. In 1988, Camilo debuted on a major record label, Sony, with the release of Michel Camilo, which became a bestseller and held the top jazz album spot for ten consecutive weeks. Special guests joined in with Camilo, such as percussionist Sammy Figueroa and tap dancer Raul. Other bestselling albums followed and so did the accolades, including a Grammy and an Emmy. Camilo's collaborative 2000 album with flamenco guitarist Tomatito Spain won Best Latin Jazz Album in the first Latin Grammy Awards.

As well as being a performer, Camilo is a composer and has written scores for several Spanish language films including Los peores años de nuestra vida and the award-winning Amo tu cama rica.

Camilo tours extensively, and lectures in Europe, the US, and in the Conservatory of Music of Puerto Rico. He holds several honorary degrees, a Visiting Professorship and a Doctorate at Berklee College of Music, and has been honored in his home country by being named a Knight of the Heraldic Order of Christopher Columbus, and being awarded the Silver Cross of the Order of Duarte, Sanchez & Mella.

== Association with other musicians ==
Camilo's regular trio lineup for many years had his long-term friends Anthony Jackson on contrabass guitar and Cliff Almond on drums. Charles Flores has occupied the trio's bass seat since their Grammy-winning album Live at the Blue Note. Lately Camilo has drummer Dafnis Prieto as part of his trio. This new trio released the album Spirit of the Moment in April 2007.

Other musicians he has played with include Tito Puente, Paquito D'Rivera, Dizzy Gillespie, Katia Labèque, Toots Thielemans, Airto Moreira, Chuck Mangione, Stanley Turrentine, Claudio Roditi, Nancy Alvarez, Mongo Santamaría, George Benson, Eddie Palmieri, Jon Faddis, Gonzalo Rubalcaba, Lew Soloff, Tania Maria, Jaco Pastorius, Patato, Randy Brecker, Michael Brecker, Chuck Loeb, Giovanni Hidalgo, Guarionex Aquino, Wynton Marsalis, Dave Valentin, Flora Purim, Delfeayo Marsalis, Chucho Valdés, Joe Lovano, Herbie Hancock, Tomatito, John Patitucci, David Sanchez, Hiromi Uehara, Cachao, Marco Rizo, Marcus Roberts, Steve Gadd, Danilo Perez, Gary Burton, Billy Taylor, Dave Weckl, Hilton Ruiz, Roy Hargrove, Romero Lubambo, Niels-Henning Ørsted Pedersen, Leny Andrade, Bireli Lagrene, Marian McPartland, Leonard Slatkin, Arturo Sandoval, Frank Colón, Aisha Syed Castro, Béla Fleck, Lou Marini, Cliff Almond, Juan Luis Guerra 4.40, Mark Walker.

Camilo is one of the ambassadors to Music Traveler GmbH, together with Billy Joel, Hans Zimmer, John Malkovich, Sean Lennon, Adrien Brody.

== Discography ==
=== As leader/co-leader ===
Year recorded	Title	Label	Year released	Notes
1984	French Toast	Electric Bird	1984	As French Toast
1985	Why Not?	Electric Bird	1985	With Lew Soloff (trumpet), Chris Hunter (alto sax, tenor sax), Anthony Jackson (bass), Dave Weckl (drums), Guarionex Aquino and Sammy Figueroa (percussion)
1986	Suntan/In Trio	Electric Bird	1986	With Anthony Jackson (bass), Dave Weckl and Joel Rosenblatt (drums)
1988	Michel Camilo	CBS Portrait	1988	With Marc Johnson, Lincoln Goines and Marcus "Benjy" Johnson (bass), Joel Rosenblatt and Dave Weckl (drums), Mongo Santamaría (conga)
1989	On Fire	CBS Portrait· Epic	1986	With Marc Johnson and Michael Bowie (bass), Marvin "Smitty" Smith, Joel Rosenblatt and Dave Weckl (drums), Sammy Figueroa (conga)
1990	On the Other Hand	Epic	1990	With Chris Hunter and Ralph Bowen (alto sax), Michael Mossman (trumpet), Michael Bowie (bass), Cliff Almond (drums), D.K. Dyson (vocals), Sammy Figueroa (percussion, congas)
1991	Amo Tu Cama Rica			Soundtrack
1993	Rendezvous	Columbia		With Anthony Jackson (bass), Dave Weckl (drums)
1994	One More Once	Columbia		With big band
1996	Two Much			soundtrack
1997	Thru My Eyes	TropiJazz/RMM		With Anthony Jackson, Lincoln Goines and John Patitucci (bass), Cliff Almond and Horacio Hernández (drums)
2000	Spain	Verve		Duo, with Tomatito (guitar)
2001	Calle 54			Soundtrack
2001	Piano Concerto, Suite & Caribe	Decca		BBC Symphony Orchestra conducted by Leonard Slatkin
2002	Triangulo	Telarc		With Anthony Jackson, Horacio Hernández (drums)
2003	Live at the Blue Note	Telarc		With Chuck Flores (bass), Horacio Hernández (drums); in concert
2004	Solo	Telarc		Solo piano
2006	Rhapsody in Blue	Telarc		With Barcelona Symphony Orchestra
2006	Spain Again	Emarcy		Duo, with Tomatito (guitar)
2006	Spirit of the Moment	Telarc		Trio, with Dafnis Prieto (drums), Charles Flores (bass)
2009	Caribe - Michel Camilo Big Band			[CD + DVD-Video]
2011	Mano a Mano	Emarcy		Trio, with Charles Flores (bass), Giovanni Hidalgo (percussion)
2013	What's Up?	Okeh		Solo piano
2016	Spain Forever	Universal		Duo, with Tomatito (guitar)
2017	Live in London	Redondo Music		Solo piano; in concert
2019	Essence	Sony Music Labels, Inc.		With Diego Urcola, John Walsh, Kalí Rodríguez-Peña, Michael Philip Mossman, Raúl Agraz (trumpet, flugelhorn), Jason Jackson, Michael Dease, Steve Davis, David Taylor (trombone), Antonio Hart (alto sax, flute), Sharel Cassity (alto sax, clarinet), Ralph Bowen (tenor sax, flute), Adam Kolker (tenor sax), Frank Basile (baritone sax, bass clarinet), Michel Camilo (piano), Ricky Rodriguez (bass), Cliff Almond (drums), Eliel Lazo (percussions, voice)
2024	Spain Forever Again	Universal		Duo, with Tomatito (guitar)

=== As sideman ===
Year recorded	Leader	Title	Label
1985	Gerry Niewood	Share My Dream	
1996	Giovanni Hidalgo	Hands of Rhythm	
