= Live in London 1980 =

Live album by The Fall
- Released: February 1982
- Recorded: 11 December 1980
- Venues: Acklam Hall, London
- Genre: Post-punk
- Length: 60:29
- Label: Chaos Tapes
- Producer: none

The Fall chronology
Slates (1981)	Live in London 1980 (1982)	Hex Enduction Hour (1982)

Live in London 1980 is a live album by the Fall, released in 1982 on cassette on the Chaos Tapes label. Initially a limited edition of 4,000 copies, the album has since been reissued several times as The Legendary Chaos Tape.

== Recording and release ==
The Fall had played two nights at the 600-capacity Acklam Hall venue (later known as Bay 63 and Subterania, before reopening as a nightclub) in Notting Hill on 11 and 12 December 1980, performing material from the recently released Grotesque (After the Gramme) album as well as songs that would later appear on Slates and Hex Enduction Hour. The band had been booked by Mike Hinc, who claimed that the band had broken the terms of their contract by playing another gig in London, at the 100 Club, a week earlier, which Hinc claimed "split the audience and meant a bad night for everyone". Featuring the performance from the 11th, recorded by Grant Showbiz, the original release misidentified a handful of tracks, with "An Older Lover etc" being listed simply as "?" - although the track was unreleased at the time of the performance, Slates had been issued nearly a year prior to this cassette. Mark E. Smith also told the NME that he felt Chaos Tapes had released the wrong recording and that the 12th had seen a better performance (as quoted in the 2004 edition sleevenotes by Daryl Easlea).

The recording is of only adequate sound quality and the performance is notably shoddy in places, with some songs badly fluffed by the group and even Smith making lyrical errors. However, it dated from a time when live albums by The Fall were not the regular occurrence they later became and the 4000-copy edition on Chaos Tapes was snapped up quickly. Just a few weeks later, the group released one of their most highly regarded studio albums, Hex Enduction Hour.

Chaos Tapes was a short-lived imprint, specialising in live material by established punk artists and releasing exclusively on the cassette format; the inner sleeve of this release advertised previous releases by the likes of Anti-Pasti, Discharge, Vice Squad, Chelsea and G.B.H.

== Reissues ==
The album has been issued on CD four times. It was issued via Scout Releases/Rough Trade in 1996, in the US only through Feel Good All Over in 1997 and then in 1999 through the group's own Cog Sinister imprint. On each of these occasions it was issued under the title The Legendary Chaos Tape. Castle Music restored the original title upon a further reissue in 2004 and added three more tracks taken from London performances in November 1980; "Cary Grant's Wedding", "Totally Wired" and "The NWRA". The sleeve does not identify the exact venues where these tracks were recorded. This edition was also released on vinyl by Italian label Earmark in 2005.

== Reception ==
Professional ratings
Review scores
Source	Rating
AllMusic	3/5 stars
AllMusic	3/5 stars
Sounds	4/5 stars

Edwin Pouncey, reviewing the album for Sounds, gave it four stars, commenting that "the recording quality is good, with Mark's voice predominantly up front, providing some excellent moments, notably 'New Face in Hell' where Mark's vocal is mutated into a shrieking echo spitting out the words to some crazy nightmare."

Ned Raggett, reviewing the 1995 CD reissue for AllMusic, gave it three stars, stating that it "captures more of the anti-smooth genius that was and is the Fall", and that it includes "some of the Fall's all-time best". A review of the 1997 CD release on the Feel Good All Over label was also given three stars by the site's Ted Mills, who stated that the "performance is vintage Fall", and called it "past glories covered with a patina of analog distortion".

The original cassette release reached number 7 in the UK Independent Chart in 1982, spending ten weeks on the chart in total.

== Track listing ==
1. "Middle Mass/Crap Rap"
2. "English Scheme"
3. "New Face In Hell"
4. "That Man"
5. "An Older Lover etc."
6. "Slates, Slags, etc."
7. "Prole Art Threat"
8. "Container Drivers"
9. "Jawbone And The Air-Rifle"
10. "In The Park"
11. "Leave The Capitol"
12. "Spectre Vs Rector"
13. "Pay Your Rates"
14. "Impression Of J Temperance"

== Personnel ==
- Mark E. Smith – vocals
- Marc Riley – guitar, vocals
- Craig Scanlon - guitar
- Steve Hanley – bass guitar
- Paul Hanley – drums
