= London Live =

London Live may refer to:

- London Live (TV channel), a local television channel in London, England
- London Live (TV programme), a 2006–2009 UK programme produced by 3DD Productions
- London Live, branding for BBC Radio London 2000–2001
- "London Live", a song by Atomic Kitten from the 2001 DVD So Far So Good
- London: Live, a 2009 album by An Albatross
- London Live '68, a 1998 album by Fleetwood Mac
- London beHofaah (London – Live), a 1995 album by Chava Alberstein

== See also ==
- Live in London (disambiguation)
