= Hex Enduction Hour =

Studio album by The Fall
- Released: 8 March 1982
- Recorded: 1981 at Regal Cinema, Hitchin, England; August 1981 at Hljóðriti, Reykjavík, Iceland
- Genre: Post-punk
- Length: 60:08
- Label: Kamera
- Producers: Richard Mazda; Mark E. Smith

The Fall chronology
Slates (1981)	Hex Enduction Hour (1982)	A Part of America Therein, 1981 (1982)

Hex Enduction Hour is the fourth studio album by the English post-punk group the Fall. Released on 8 March 1982, it was built on low-fidelity production values and caustic lyrical content of their earlier recordings, and features a two-drummer lineup. Frontman Mark E. Smith established an abrasive Northern aesthetic built as part of the 20th century literary traditions of kitchen sink realism and magic realism. Smith described the album as an often-satirical but deliberate reaction to the contemporary music scene, a stand against "bland bastards like Elvis Costello and Spandau Ballet..."

Recording for Hex began during a 1981 three-concert visit to Iceland, where Smith was inspired both by the otherworldliness of the island's landscape and the enthusiasm of an audience unaccustomed to visiting rock groups. The Fall recorded "Hip Priest", "Iceland" and non-album single "Look, Know" at the Hljóðriti studio in Reykjavík, and the remaining tracks in a disused cinema in Hitchin, Hertfordshire.

Its cover art was seen by many in the music industry as coarse and lacking accepted layout or typographical qualities; HMV would only shelve it back to front on their racks. The album peaked at number 71 on the UK Albums Chart and attracted the attention of several record labels.

== Background and recording ==
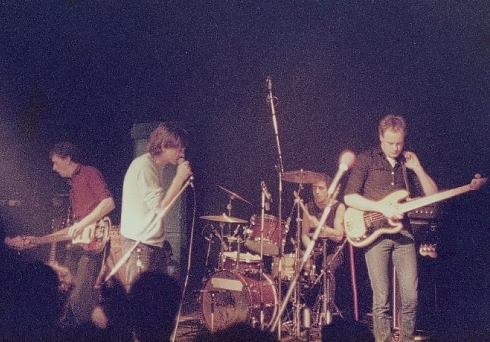
The Fall, Hamburg 13 April 1984. L-R: Scanlon, Smith, Burns, Hanley

By 1981, the Fall had released three critically acclaimed albums, but band leader Mark E. Smith felt the group was undervalued and poorly supported by their label Rough Trade Records, whom he regarded as "a bunch of well-meaning but inept hippies". He felt constrained by the label's ethos and worried that the Fall were in danger of becoming "just another Rough Trade band". Smith made overtures to other labels, and found kindred adventurous spirits at small emergent label Kamera Records. Kamera's first release in November 1981 was the Fall's single "Lie Dream of a Casino Soul", which also featured drummer Karl Burns for the first time since Live at the Witch Trials. Burns previously substituted for Paul Hanley on a US tour when the latter was denied a visa for being too young, and upon the group's return to the UK, Smith suggested that Burns should stay on as a second drummer.

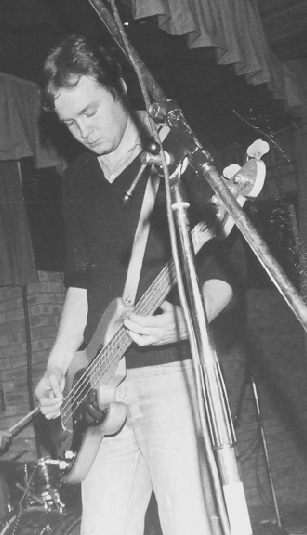
Steve Hanley

In September 1981, the Fall travelled to Reykjavík, Iceland for the first time to play three concerts, organised by Einar Örn. While there, they recorded three new songs ("Hip Priest", "Iceland" and non-album single "Look, Know") at Hljóðriti studio. The studio, normally used by local folk artists, had lava walls (according to Smith, it resembled an igloo), a factor that gave it its otherworldly sound. Kamera agreed to pay costs for the rest of the recordings and hired producer Richard Mazda, who suggested that the sessions would take place in a disused cinema in Hitchin, known as Regal Sound Studio, as the ambience would resemble the band's live sound. According to critic John Doran, "uncertainty around a record label seeps into the album's sound, the work of a band with a gun pressed to their heads".

Hex Enduction Hour takes influence from the Velvet Underground's "Sister Ray", Captain Beefheart and the early 1970s Krautrock band Can. Smith has said that the title was intended to invoke witchcraft, that he concocted the word "Enduction" to suggest the album could be a listener's induction into the Fall and that "Hex" was a reference to this being the band's sixth release. His vocals are higher in the mix than on previous Fall releases and were described in 1982 by Sounds as "emerg[ing] like a loudhailer from a fog of guitar scratch". The songs were deliberately produced in a raw and low-fidelity approach by Smith, Grant Showbiz and Richard Mazda in a sound described at the time as a "well produced noise" that was acceptable by Fall standards. Critic Mark Storace claimed he "could have done a better job on a 4-track if I was pissed out of my head". Smith responded by saying that "nowadays people just can't just shut up if they don't know what they're talking about." (Note: "When your mired in the shit of the times ... you start to question not only people's taste but their existences. I'd rather listen to Polish builders clanking away than any of that crap." Smith, 113) Elaborating on the purposely amateurish production values, Smith remarked that "it was all recorded in deliberately bad places ... deliberately simple sort of thing. Three songs were written at rehearsal and done the next time."

== Music and lyrics ==
The album was the Fall's first to include Karl Burns and Paul Hanley in the band's classic two-drummer lineup. Smith intended the album's lyrics "to be like reading a really good book. You have a couple of beers, sit down and immerse yourself. None of those fuckers Elvis Costello or Spandau Ballet did that". Hex Enduction Hour was written during an unusually prolific period in his career. Many of the tracks had already been dropped from the band's live set by the time they visited Australia and New Zealand in July 1982. The earlier single "Look, Know" was recorded during the Icelandic sessions but not included on the album. This was characteristic of Smith's "never look back" approach.

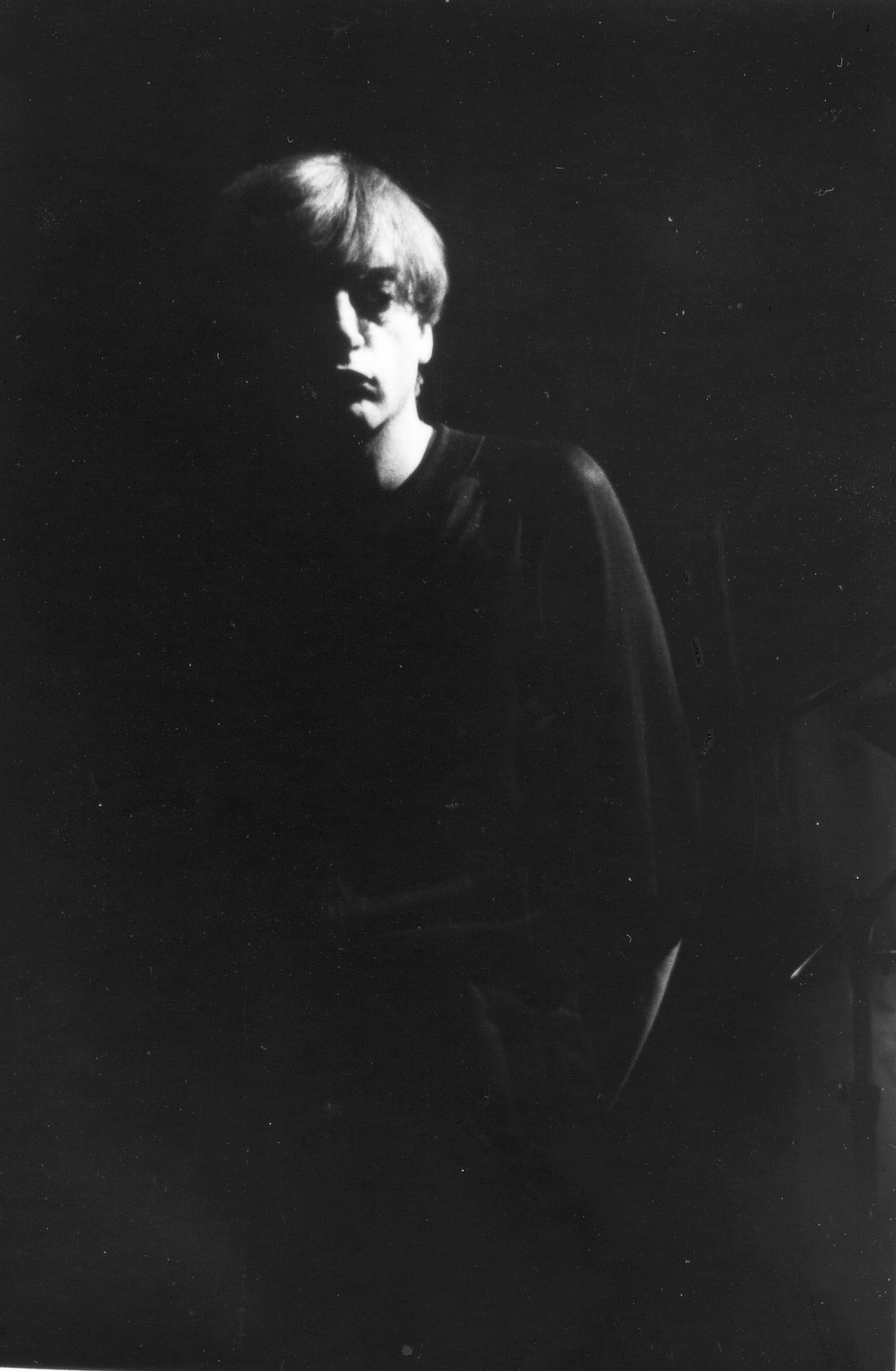
Mark E. Smith in 1990

Opening track "The Classical" acts as a statement of intent similar to that in "Crap Rap 2/Like to Blow" from the Fall's debut album Live at the Witch Trials. Whereas on the earlier song Smith described himself as "Northern white crap that talks back", in the opening lines of Hex Enduction Hour he complains that the fact that contemporary music lacks culture is his "brag", observing that a "taste for bullshit reveals a lust for a home of office" and references "obligatory niggers", before accusingly shouting "Hey there, fuckface, hey there, fuckface". Pavement released a cover of the track in the late 1990s; Smith later dismissed them as mere Fall copyists. "Jawbone and the Air Rifle" depicts a nightmarish folklore tale of a poacher (described as a "rabbit killer") bored by a decades-old marriage who escapes by roaming the local countryside at night hunting prey. One night the protagonist "lets out a misplaced shot", which draws the Hex of the "Broken Brothers Pentacle Church". The song's main focal point is toward the end when the lyrics detail a series of semi-religious, semi-pagan horrific and repeating hallucinations.

"Hip Priest" was recorded in Iceland in a single take, and is one of Smith's most personal songs, apparently written in bemusement following a recent rise in the band's popularity. The track has been compared to dub but in its Northern bleakness "it had been invented in a drizzly motorway rather than in recording studios in Jamaica." "Hip Priest" was re-recorded in 1988 in a glam rock style as "Big New Prinz" for the album I Am Kurious Oranj. An excerpt of "Hip Priest" was used in 1991 in the climactic end scene of Jonathan Demme's film The Silence of the Lambs.

"Fortress/Deer Park" starts with a Casio VL-1 rhythm preset, the same as used by Trio on the 1982 hit single "Da Da Da". Its lyrics form a broad and jaundiced look at English culture and subcultures in the early 1980s. It mentions "Good King Harry was there, fucking Jimmy Savile" while the lines "I took a walk down W11; I had to walk through 500 European punks" are a dry put-down of the fashion-oriented in Notting Hill.

"Winter (Hostel-Maxi)"
Sample of "Winter (Hostel-Maxi)", recorded in Iceland

"Who Makes The Nazis"
Sample of "Who Makes The Nazis", recorded December 1981

"Winter" is split into two parts, broken by a fade out and fade in: "Winter (Hostel-Maxi)" closes Side 1 of the record and "Winter 2" opens Side 2. It was described by Smith in early press releases as "concerning an insane child who is taken over by a spirit from the mind of a cooped-up alcoholic". During the intro of "Winter (Hostel-Maxi)", the narrator describes waiting, hung over, in the early afternoon for the pubs to open. The remainder of the song consists of descriptions of and encounters with a dry-out house, a cleaning lady (the mother of the "insane child"), a feminist with anti-nicotine and anti-nuclear stickers on her car (an Austin Maxi) and a "half-wit" child. After that, the lyrics move towards magic realism and ad-libbed inscrutability: "The mad kid had four lights: the average is two point-five-lights; the mediocre is two lights".

"Who Makes the Nazis" concludes that Nazis are born of "intellectual halfwits". The track contains a number of sounds played through a dictaphone, a device that was to feature heavily in later Fall albums, most notably This Nation's Saving Grace.

"Iceland" was improvised in a single take. Smith was taken by a country that he described in 2008 as still inaccessible and "totally unlike what it is now. Beer was against the law. You could only drink shit like pints of peach schnapps". (Note: "But since then it's become like anywhere else. It's like when you return to the house that you grew up in and its smaller. About a third of the youth population turned up to see us. I feel guilty for spawning The Sugarcubes and Björk." Smith, 114) It consists of a two-note piano figure and a banjo part, over which Smith played a tape recording he had made of the wind howling outside his bedroom window. According to guitarist Marc Riley, "He [Smith] just said he needed a tune, something Dylanish, and we knocked around on the piano in the studio and came up with that. But we hadn't heard the words until he suddenly did them." The line "Fall down flat in the Cafe aisle without a glance from the clientele" describes an incident that had happened to Smith that morning. He had tripped in a nearby cafe and fallen across several tables. He was surprised by the lack of response from the other customers, who seemed to have dismissed him as just another drunk.

The closing track, "And This Day", originally lasted about 25 minutes, but was edited down to ten minutes to fit the album's length; it still remains one of the Fall's longest studio songs.

== Cover art ==
Hex Enduction Hour's all-white cover is lined with pen marks and scribbles and was described by music critic Robertson as "meticulously shoddy". It consists of a series of pen scribbles laid down by Smith. The markings are mostly random rhetorical phrases and sentence fragments added by Smith and include wording such as "Lie-Dream 80% of 10% OR 6% over no less than 1/4 = ??????", "Hail Sainsbury's!", "CHUMMY LIFESTYLE", "HAVE A BLEEDIN GUESS" and "CIGS. SMOKED HERE". In an interview with Sounds that summer, Smith mentioned that he liked artwork to reflect the album content and that his graphic choices reflected his attitude to music. He mentioned how he was drawn to cheap and misspelled posters, amateur layouts of local papers and printed cash and carry signs with "inverted commas where you don't need them".

The album art was seen by many within the music industry as coarse and lacking accepted layout or typographical qualities. HMV would only shelve the sleeve back to front on their racking shelves.

== Reception ==
Professional ratings
Review scores
Source	Rating
AllMusic	4/5 stars
Encyclopedia of Popular Music	4/5 stars
Mojo	5/5 stars
Pitchfork	9.6/10
PopMatters	9/10
Record Collector	5/5 stars
The Rolling Stone Album Guide	4/5 stars
Sounds	5/5 stars
Spin Alternative Record Guide	9/10
Uncut	5/5 stars

Hex Enduction Hour was the first Fall album to reach the UK Albums Chart, where it spent three weeks, peaking at no. 71. By mid-1983 it had sold 20,000 copies, reflecting a surge in the band's popularity, and five years into their career brought them to the attention of major record labels. Critics were highly enthusiastic. Reviewing for the NME, Richard Cook described the band as tighter and more disciplined than in earlier recordings, and call Hex as "their master piece to date". He praised their use of recording-studio techniques and atmospherics without resorting to glamorisation. Melody Maker's Colin Irwin said it was "incredibly exciting and utterly compelling". Edwin Pouncey of Sounds said it was "the furthest adventure the Fall have ever embarked upon, one that absorbs and holds the listener in a grip of iron. It is also more importantly the Fall's finest hour." A dissenter was Neil McCormick of Irish fortnightly Hot Press, who dismissed the album as secondhand melodramatic punk and said that if the album was "meant to be minimalist or primitive then it fatally ignores the true primitivism of the strong melody and accessible lyrics found in folk music."

Later, Record Collector described the album as a "taut, twitchy and ominous masterclass in DIY post-punk", and singled out Smith's lyrics for praise. The Quietus, in 2009, wrote of the album as "arguably ... The Fall's mightiest hour", while Stylus Magazine wrote that "Hex demonstrates the culmination of 'early' Fall: a monolithic beast of ragged grooves piloted through the embittering miasma of English society by the verbose acidity/Joycean all-inclusiveness of Mark E. Smith." Pitchfork listed Hex Enduction Hour as the 33rd best album of the 1980s. Comedian Stewart Lee said it is favourite album and "probably the best album of all time."

According to Smith, the album's lyrics had a negative impact on the band's later career. In 1984, Motown Records expressed interest in signing the band to a new UK division, with a provisional offer of a £46,000 up-front advance. A label executive asked to hear something from the Fall's back catalogue, but Hex was the only album Smith had available; he remembered thinking, "when he hears that, we've had it." The rejection letter stated that the label saw "no commercial potential in this band whatsoever". Smith believes this was due to the "obligatory niggers" line from the opening track "The Classical".

== Re-issues ==
The album went out of print when the Kamera label folded in 1983, but a German edition on the Line imprint remained available and was repressed in 1986 on white vinyl. Line issued a CD edition, flat transferred from a later generation tape. In 2002, a new edition titled Hex Enduction Hour + (adding both sides of the "Look, Know" single) was released via Smith's Cog Sinister imprint.

The album was remastered and issued in 2005 by Sanctuary Records, along with a disc of bonus live material. Smith conceded that the remastering was an improvement, but when asked if he liked the bonus live tracks he admitted that he hadn't listened "that far". For unexplained reasons, "Look, Know" was removed from the bonus material, although its b-side remained intact; however it would later appear on The Fall Box Set 1976–2007.

== Track listing ==
Songwriting credits adapted from the original album sleeve notes.

All lyrics are written by Mark E. Smith.

Side A
No.	Title	Writer(s)	Length
1.	"The Classical"	The Fall	5:16
2.	"Jawbone and the Air-Rifle"	The Fall	3:43
3.	"Hip Priest"	The Fall	7:45
4.	"Fortress/Deer Park"	Mark E. Smith, Craig Scanlon, Marc Riley, Karl Burns	6:41
5.	"Mere Pseud Mag. Ed."	Smith	2:50
6.	"Winter (Hostel-Maxi)"	Smith, Scanlon	4:26
Total length:			30:41

Side B
No.	Title	Writer(s)	Length
1.	"Winter 2"	Smith, Scanlon	4:33
2.	"Just Step S'ways"	Smith	3:22
3.	"Who Makes the Nazis?"	Smith	4:27
4.	"Iceland"	Smith, Scanlon, Riley, Steve Hanley	6:42
5.	"And This Day"	The Fall	10:18
Total length:			29:22

2002 Hex Enduction Hour+ bonus tracks
No.	Title	Writer(s)	Length
12.	"Look, Know" (single A-side)	Smith, S. Hanley, Burns, Riley	4:36
13.	"I'm into C.B." (single B-side)	Smith	6:29

2005 "Expanded Deluxe Edition" bonus disc
No.	Title	Writer(s)	Length
1.	"Deer Park" (from John Peel session broadcast 15 September 1981)	Smith, Riley, Scanlon, Burns	4:26
2.	"Who Makes the Nazis?" (from John Peel session broadcast 15 September 1981)	Smith	2:57
3.	"I'm into C.B." (B-side of "Look, Know" single, 1982)	Smith	6:30
4.	"Session Musician" (live at the Bierkeller, Leeds, 5 November 1981)	Smith, Riley, Scanlon, S. Hanley	9:11
5.	"Jazzed Up Punk Shit" (live at the 666 Club, Manchester, 15 May 1982)	Smith, Scanlon, Riley, S. Hanley	4:10
6.	"I'm into C.B. (Stars on 45 Version)" (live at Fagins, Manchester, 30 September 1981)	Smith, Scanlon, Kay Carroll	3:14
7.	"And This Day" (live at Main Street, Auckland, New Zealand, 20 August 1982)	The Fall	6:13
8.	"Deer Park" (live at Main Street, Auckland, 20 August 1982)	Smith, Riley, Scanlon, Burns	9:34
9.	"And This Day (Revisited)" (live at Astoria 2, London, 26 February 1997)	Smith, Riley, Scanlon, Burns, S. Hanley, P. Hanley	5:24

== Personnel ==
The Fall

- Mark E. Smith – vocals, tape operation on "Fortress/Deer Park" and "Iceland", guitar, production, cover design
- Steve Hanley – bass guitar, backing vocals
- Marc Riley – electronic organ, guitar, piano, backing vocals, banjo on "Iceland"
- Craig Scanlon – guitar, backing vocals, piano on "Iceland"
- Paul Hanley – drums, guitar on "Winter"
- Karl Burns – drums, backing vocals, tape operation on "Fortress/Deer Park"

Additional personnel

- Kay Carroll – percussion, backing vocals, manager

Technical personnel

- Richard Mazda – production
- Tony J. Sutcliffe – engineering
- Alan Skinner – cover design

== Charts ==
Chart (1982)	Peak position
New Zealand Albums (RMNZ)	11

== Notes ==
=== Sources ===
- Beck, Jay. Lowering the Boom: Critical Studies in Film Sound. Champaign, IL: University of Illinois Press, 2008. ISBN 978-0-252-07532-2
- Britton, Amy. Revolution Rock: The Albums Which Defined Two Ages. London: AuthorHouse, 2007. ISBN 978-1-4678-8710-6
- Edge, Brian. Paintwork: Portrait of The Fall. London: Omnibus Press, 1989. ISBN 978-0-7119-1740-8
- Ford, Simon. Hip Priest: The Story of Mark E.Smith and the Fall. London: Quartet Books, 2002. ISBN 978-0-7043-8167-4
- Goddard, Michael; Halligan, Benjamin. Mark E. Smith and The Fall: Art, Music and Politics. London: Ashgate, 2010. ISBN 978-0-7546-6867-1
- Hanley, Paul. Have a Bleedin Guess: The Story of Hex Enduction Hour. Pontefract: Route Publishing, 2020. ISBN 978-1-901927-80-1
- Reynolds, Simon. Rip it Up and Start Again: Postpunk 1978–1984. London: Faber & Faber, 2006. ISBN 978-0-571-21570-6
- Simpson, Dave. The Fallen: Life In and Out of Britain's Most Insane Group. London: Canongate, 2010. ISBN 978-1-84767-144-8
- Smith, Mark E. Renegade: The Lives and Tales of Mark E. Smith. London: Penguin, 2009. ISBN 978-0-14-102866-8
- Thompson, Dave. A User's Guide to the Fall. London: Helter Skelter, 2003. ISBN 978-1-900924-57-3
- Young, Rob. Rough Trade. London: Black Dog Publishing, 2006. ISBN 978-1-904772-47-7
