= Al Posto del Mondo =

Studio album by Chiara Civello
- Released: February 10, 2012
- Recorded: 2011
- Genres: Vocal jazz, pop
- Length: 37:31
- Label: Sony
- Producer: Chiara Civello

Chiara Civello chronology
7752 (2010)	Al Posto del Mondo (2012)	Canzoni (2014)

Al Posto del Mondo is the fourth album by Italian jazz vocalist Chiara Civello and the first that she has produced.

== Track listing ==
All tracks are written by Chiara Civello.

No.	Title	Length
1.	"Al Posto Del Mondo"	3:51
2.	"Hey Caro Ragazzo"	3:00
3.	"Got to Go"	3:10
4.	"A Me Non Devi Dire Mai"	4:08
5.	"Il Cuore é Uno Zingaro"	3:50
6.	"Scusa"	3:05
7.	"E Se"	4:13
8.	"Problemi"	3:47
9.	"Ma Una Vita No"	3:45
10.	"Trouble"	4:44

== See also ==
- La Llave de Mi Corazón - Juan Luis Guerra
