= Aisha Syed Castro =

Dominican violinist (born 1989)

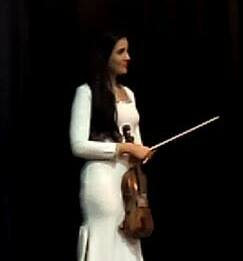
- Aisha Syed Castro in 2015.
- Born: September 15, 1989 (age 37); Santiago, Dominican Republic
- Occupation: Violinist
- Parent(s): Saif Syed and Carolina Castro

Aisha Syed Castro (born September 15, 1989) is a Dominican violinist and a member of the Yehudi Menuhin School orchestra.

== Biography ==
Aisha was born in Santiago, Dominican Republic, the daughter of Saifuddin Syed, of Pakistani descent and Carolina Castro. She is the second of four children. She has three siblings: one sister, Sabah, and two brothers, Kabir and Kareem.

She started studying violin and flute when she was four years old at El Hogar de la Armonia in the City of Santiago, Dominican Republic with Professor Henry Disla. Then she traveled twice a week to Santo Domingo to take classes with Maestro Hipolito Javier Guerrero, years later became Maestro Caonex Peguero's student . By the age of six she was already a member of the Children's Symphony Orchestra.

At 11 she debuted with the National Symphony Orchestra, becoming their youngest solo performer. The same year she attended a symposium on the violin at the Juilliard School in New York City.

In 2002, following a two-year audition process, she entered the Yehudi Menuhin School in London. She was the first Latin American to be admitted to the school. She passed all the tests and secured a scholarship from the British government.

Aisha presently resides in London, and has performed 57 concerts in Europe and the Dominican Republic.

=== Other performances ===
In 2001, she performed at the National Theater in Santo Domingo, Dominican Republic.

In 2007 she shared the stage with Michel Camilo Dominican Jazz Player at the Casandra Awards and shared a scene with pianist Jeremy Menuhin.

In 2009, she performed at the National Theater in Santo Domingo for the Casandra Awards. In March that year, she shared the stage at the Eilat Festival in Israel with performers of classical music such as violinist Julian Rachlin, Aleksey Igudessman, Pavel Vernikov and Boris Kushnir. She was directed by director and violinist Maxim Vengerov. She was later selected by Israeli composer Noam Sheriff to perform the world premiere of his Concerto Canarian Vespers, at the Menuhin Festival Gstaad in July 2009 in Gstaad, Switzerland.

As a soloist she has performed in festivals such as Claygate, Shipley, Summer, Royal Tunbridge Wells International Music, Thaxted and Bath. Her other performances include fundraising in Europe at The Leatherhead Charities, Princess Trusts, Rainbow and Save the Children. She also performed at the Royal Festival Hall a concert called "Moving Young Minds". She performed for the Diplomatic Corps in the City of London, for the commemoration of the Independence of the Dominican Republic at the Bolivar Hall.

== Awards ==
In January 2009, Syed won an international contest in which three thousand young people from 20 countries took part. She won the Cassandra 2009 as an International Violinist.
