= What's Up? (Michel Camilo album) =

Studio album by Michel Camilo
- Released: 2013
- Recorded: February 14–15, 2013
- Studio: The Carriage House Studios, Stamford, Connecticut
- Genre: Jazz
- Label: Okeh

What's Up? is a solo piano album by Michel Camilo. It was recorded in 2013 and released later that year by Okeh Records.

== Recording and music ==
AllMusic states that the album of solo piano performances was recorded on February 14–15, 2013 at The Carriage House Studios, Stamford, Connecticut. This was Camilo's second solo piano album, after Solo. Of the eleven tracks, four are standards and seven are Camilo compositions.

== Release and reception ==
What's Up? was released by Okeh Records in 2013. An All About Jazz reviewer described Camilo's approach: "[he plays] the upright bass counter line with, usually, the right hand playing melody and harmonic content, in chords or in octaves. In this context, there is a more balanced presentation, with hard-driving note flurries more at a minimum."

The JazzTimes reviewer concluded: "Seldom a dull moment here." The AllMusic reviewer wrote: "What's Up? is a commanding performance by a truly masterful, wildly creative jazz pianist and composer." The album won the 2013 Latin Grammy Award for Best Jazz Album.

== Track listing ==
1. "What's Up"
2. "A Place in Time"
3. "Take Five"
4. "Sandra's Serenade"
5. "Island Beat"
6. "Alone Together"
7. "Paprika"
8. "Love for Sale"
9. "Chan Chan"
10. "On Fire"
11. "At Dawn"

== Personnel ==
- Michel Camilo – piano
