= Suntan/In Trio =

Studio album by Michel Camilo
- Released: 1986
- Recorded: June 1986
- Genre: Latin jazz
- Label: Electric Bird
- Producer: Michel Camilo

Michel Camilo chronology
| Why Not? (1985) | Suntan/In Trio (1986) | Michel Camilo (1988) |

Professional ratings
Review scores
| Source | Rating |
|---|---|
| The Penguin Guide to Jazz Recordings, 9th edition | 3/4 stars |

Suntan/In Trio is a studio album by Michel Camilo, released in 1986.

== Recording, release and reception ==
The album was recorded in June 1986. It was released by Electric Bird. The Penguin Guide to Jazz commented on the fuzziness of some aspects of the recording quality and wrote that the "Latin component is also more prominent [than on Camilo's earlier albums]".

== Track listing ==
1. "We Three" (Michel Camilo, Arnold Evans)
2. "Tombo in 7/4" (Airto Moreira)
3. "Las Olas" (Jaco Pastorius)
4. "(Used to Be) Cha-Cha" (Jaco Pastorius)
5. "Suntan" (Michel Camilo)

== Personnel ==
- Michel Camilo – piano
- Anthony Jackson – bass
- Joel Rosenblatt (tracks 1 & 3), Dave Weckl (tracks 2, 4 & 5) – drums
