= Spain (Michel Camilo and Tomatito album) =

Studio album by Michel Camilo and Tomatito
- Released: 2000
- Genre: Jazz, Latin, Latin jazz, Flamenco
- Producer: Michel Camilo

Michel Camilo and Tomatito chronology
Thru My Eyes (1997)	Spain (2000)	Calle 54 (Soundtrack) (2001)

Spain is a studio album by Michel Camilo and Tomatito, released in 2000. It was recorded at Carriage House Studios in August 1999 and published by Universal Music under various labels around the world.

== Track listing ==
1. Spain Intro (Joaquin Rodrigo)
2. Spain (Chick Corea)
3. Bésame Mucho (Consuelo Velázquez)
4. A Mi Niño José (Tomatito)
5. Two Much / Love Theme (Michel Camilo)
6. Para Troilo y Salgán (Luis Salinas)
7. La Vacilona (Tomatito)
8. Aire de Tango (Luis Salinas)

== Credits ==
- Michel Camilo – Piano, Producer, Arrangements
- Tomatito – Spanish Guitar
- Julio Martí – Executive Producer
- Phil Magnotti – Recording, Mixing and Mastering Engineer
- John Shylosky – Assistant Recording Engineer

== Accolades ==
The album won Best Latin Jazz Album in the first-ever Latin Grammy Awards.

== See also ==
- Michel Camilo discography
