= Cucu Diamantes =

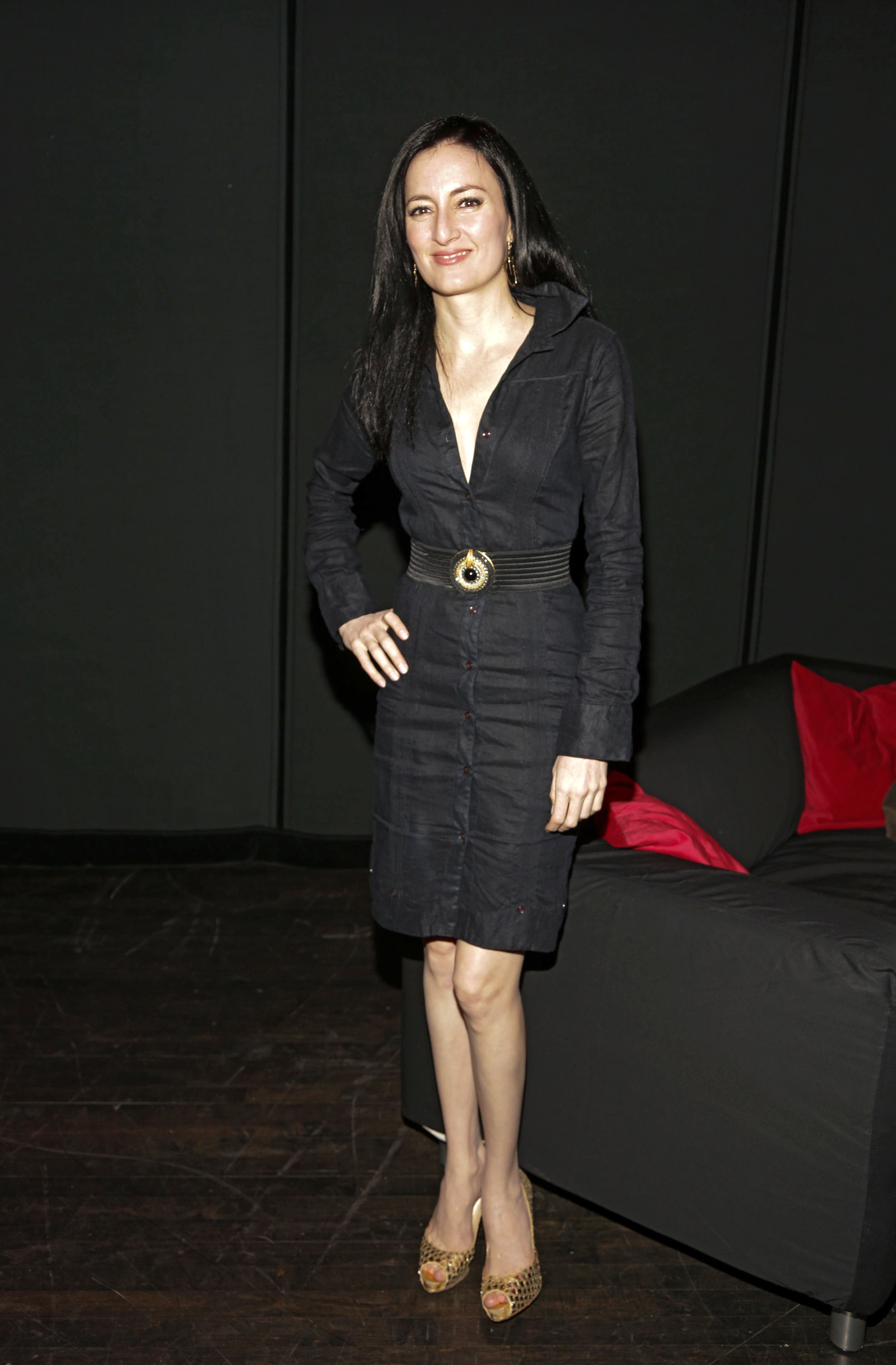
- Diamantes at the 2013 Miami International Film Festival presentation of Amor Cronico

Background information
- Born: Havana, Cuba
- Genres: Latin, pop, rock
- Occupations: Singer, songwriter, philanthropist
- Instrument: Vocals
- Formerly of: Yerba Buena
- Website: www.example.com

Cucu Diamantes is a Grammy nominated Cuban-American singer, songwriter, and philanthropist. Her 2009 debut album Cuculand received a Latin Grammy Nomination for Best Alternative Song, "Más Fuerte". Diamantes is also cofounder and lead singer of Grammy nominated New York City fusion band Yerba Buena. A frequent collaborator, Diamantes has worked with Carlinhos Brown, Yotuel Romero, Lenine, Fat Boy Slim, Meshell Ndegeocello, Vico C, Les Nubians, Rossy de Palma, John Leguizamo, Paulina Rubio, Aleks Syntek, and Beto Cuevas.

== Early life ==
Of Spanish, African, Chinese and French heritage, Diamantes was born and raised in Havana, Cuba. Diamantes began her musical career singing backup vocals for a salsa band in Rome, where she was studying art. After finishing her studies, she moved to New York City to pursue her music career.

== Yerba Buena ==
Together with Andres Levin, Diamantes founded the band Yerba Buena. The band's debut, President Alien, was nominated for a 2004 Grammy. Yerba Buena has received praise as one of New York's most influential Latin Fusion bands of all time.

== CuCuLand ==
In March 2009, Diamantes released her Grammy nominated solo debut Cuculand. Diamantes described the album as a "classy, tragic-comic theatrical cabaret album mixed with [her] Cuban roots and New York edge." The album combines Diamantes' broad musical experiences with causes central to her social conscious, including love from a woman's point of view and themes of personal independence. Diamantes specifically cites her aunt as an inspiration and source of strength in forming her personal identity that is a focal point on the album. The Washington Post wrote that "Cuculand has a narrative that reveals Cucu's pride and vulnerabilities, her heartbreak and what she's overcome."

== Amor Cronico: The Film ==
In 2012 Cucu's feature-length film premiered at SXSW. Directed by Jorge Perugorria, produced by Andres Levin and Sarah Green, Amor Cronico follows CuCu across Cuba in a historic comedic road movie.

== Philanthropic work ==
Diamantes has participated in several artistic productions and events that advocate social justice and political activism. Diamantes performed in Amnesty International's "Price of Silence" video, making a plea for universal human rights. Diamantes also performed in the "Podemos Con Obama" video, inspired by will.i.am's "Yes We Can" video, in support of Barack Obama. She also participated in the Obama Latin Inaugural Ball.

== Red Hot and Cuba ==
Diamantes is a spokesperson for Amnesty International's Protect the Human and Stop Violence Against Women campaigns. In 2009, she performed at a peace concert in Cuba to over a million fans. She is a co-founder and artistic ambassador for Music Has No Enemies, a nonprofit designed to spread social justice through film and music.

== Selected discography ==
=== Solo ===
- Cuculand (2009)

=== Yerba Buena ===
- Follow Me (2007)
- Island Life (2005)
- President Alien (2003)

=== Collaborations ===
- Heroes Soundtrack, "Maya's Theme," (2008)
- Panoptica Orchestra NPO, "Tu Sabes" (2010)
