= A Part of America Therein, 1981 =

Live album by The Fall
- Released: 1982
- Recorded: Chicago, New York, San Francisco, Houston, Memphis, May–July 1981
- Genre: Post-punk
- Length: 52:11
- Label: Cottage Records (a US division of Rough Trade Records)

The Fall chronology
Hex Enduction Hour (1982)	A Part of America Therein, 1981 (1982)	Room to Live (1982)

A Part of America Therein, 1981 is a live album by the Fall, recorded on their 1981 U.S. tour and originally released only in the U.S. in 1982.

== Recording and release ==
After a tour of Iceland with Paul Hanley on drums, singer Mark E. Smith invited Karl Burns (who had left the band early in 1979) back into the group while also retaining Hanley. For this U.S. tour, the group were without Hanley as, at 17, he was refused a visa as he was too young for the clubs the band had been booked to play in. The Fall appeared with both Burns and Hanley on drums for the next three years, though both occasionally played other instruments.

The album was compiled from recordings of live shows in Chicago, New York, Memphis, Houston, and San Francisco, between May and July 1981. The quality of recordings is variable, and the album was described as a "slap-dash document" of the band's US tour. It includes several songs that had not been released at the time of the performances, including three that would be included on Hex Enduction Hour (1982), and "Lie Dream of a Casino Soul", which was recorded and released as a single on the band's return to the UK.

=== Reissues ===
The album was given its first UK release in 1992, a "2 for 1" CD on the Dojo label alongside six-track mini album Slates. This coupling was reissued in 1998 on Essential with amended artwork. It was released as a standalone CD album in 1998 by Castle, and in expanded form in late 2004, adding four additional recordings from the same tour: "Middle Mass", "The Container Drivers" (both in Boston), "Session Musician" (New Orleans), and "Your Heart Out" (California). It was reissued again in 2017, on vinyl by Let Them Eat Vinyl, and on CD by Westworld Recordings.

== Reception ==
Professional ratings
Review scores
Source	Rating
AllMusic	3/5 stars
The Austin Chronicle	2/5 stars
Robert Christgau	B

The album received a 'B' rating from Robert Christgau, who commented "They're as consistent as The Isley Brothers: no notable rise in quality or interest, and also no falloff." AllMusic reviewer Ted Mills gave it three stars, viewing it as one of the band's best early live albums. Marc Savlov, reviewing the reissued album in 2002 for The Austin Chronicle, gave it two stars, calling it "abrasive", and opining that it showed the band "in its early, dismal anti-glory". Alex Ogg, writing for AllMusic, viewed the album as featuring "generally strong performances" but not as good as another live album from that period, Fall in a Hole. Trouser Press viewed the performances as "uniformly strong, particularly the epic 'N.W.R.A.'" The Wire considered the album showed the band "achieving its aims, with endless riffs approaching trancelike qualities", with the version of "An Older Lover" included described as "a definitive, hallucinatory live reading".

Despite only being available in the UK as an import, the album reached number 9 on the UK Independent Albums Chart in 1983.

== Track listing ==
=== Original USA LP ===
- "The North Side"
1. "The N.W.R.A." (Chicago)
2. "Hip Priest" (Chicago)
3. "Totally Wired" (New York)
4. "Lie Dream of a Casino Soul" (New York)
- "The South Side"
1. "Cash 'n' Carry" (San Francisco)
2. "An Older Lover" (Houston)
3. "Deer Park" (Houston)
4. "Winter" (Memphis)

== Personnel ==
- Mark E. Smith – vocals
- Marc Riley – guitar, keyboard, kazoo, backing vocals
- Craig Scanlon – guitar, backing vocals
- Steve Hanley – bass guitar
- Karl Burns – drums
