= Rendezvous (Michel Camilo album) =

Studio album by Michel Camilo
- Released: May 11, 1993
- Recorded: January 18–20, 1993
- Studios: Clinton Recording Studios, NYC
- Genre: Latin jazz
- Length: 49:00
- Label: Columbia
- Producers: Michel Camilo, Julio Marti

Michel Camilo chronology
On the Other Hand (1990)	Rendezvous (1993)	One More Once (1994)

Professional ratings
Review scores
Source	Rating
AllMusic	4/5 stars
The Penguin Guide to Jazz Recordings	3/4 stars

Rendezvous is a Latin jazz album by Michel Camilo, released in 1993 on the Columbia Records label. The album was produced by Camilo and Julio Marti and features nine tracks.

== Reception ==
The AllMusic reviewer commented: "Latin-tinged cookers like 'Tropical Jam' and 'Blacky' will rivet you with an improvisational energy you've never heard before, while the simple romance of 'Remembrance' offers a tender counterpoint to all the friskiness."

== Track listing ==
1. Tropical Jam (Michel Camilo) – 3:28
2. Caravan (Duke Ellington, Irving Mills, Juan Tizol) – 5:40
3. El Realejo (Michel Camilo) – 4:49
4. Rendezvous (Michel Camilo) – 5:08
5. As One (Michel Camilo) – 7:39
6. Remembrance (Michel Camilo) – 5:13
7. Blacky (Michel Camilo) – 5:06
8. Albertina (Michel Camilo) – 4:39
9. From Within (Michel Camilo) – 8:02

== Personnel ==
- Michel Camilo – piano
- Anthony Jackson – bass
- Dave Weckl – drums
