= Donna D'Cruz =

Indian-born musician

- Born: Chennai, Tamil Nadu, South India
- Occupations: Musician, DJ, Producer, Meditation Leader, Wellness/Sleep Advocate
- Years active: 1997–present
- Website: donnadcruz.com

Donna D'Cruz is an Indian-born musician who has lived in Australia and the United States. She is an international DJ, and she founded the record label Rasa Music.

== Early life ==
Donna D'Cruz was born in Chennai, Tamil Nadu, South India and raised in Australia. She grew up musically inclined in a household steeped in faith and tradition, but did not begin her meditation practice until she was 17.

== Career ==
Donna D’Cruz moved to New York City where she co-founded Australian Music International and went on to found her own record label, Rasa Music in 1998. She is also one of the world's top celebrity DJ's having performed at parties for Jean Paul Gaultier and Dolce & Gabbana productions.

== Awards ==
In 2007, Donna D’Cruz received the Asian Women in Business Entrepreneurial Leadership Award. Additionally, in 2007 she was recognized by Condé Nast Publications as a "Trendsetter" and by Paper as one of the world's "Most Beautiful People"; she was also elected by Vogue as a member of the Vogue100.
