= Live in London (Will Young video) =

Video by Will Young
- Released: 21 March 2005
- Recorded: Wembley Arena, 21 December 2004
- Length: 98 minutes (concert); 38 minutes (special features)
- Label: Sony BMG
- Director: Julia Knowles
- Producer: Sharon Ali

Will Young chronology
Will Young Live (2003)	Live in London (2005)

Live in London is the second DVD released by British singer Will Young. The DVD features his concert at Wembley Arena on 21 December 2004. It was released on 21 March 2005.

== Concert track listing ==
1. "Friday's Child" (new arrangement)
2. "Out of My Mind"
3. "Love is a Matter of Distance" (acoustic)
4. "Light My Fire" (extended)
5. "Very Kind"
6. "Save Yourself"
7. "Dance the Night Away"
8. "I Love You More Than You'll Ever Know"
9. "Free" (acoustic/gospel arrangement)
10. "Evergreen" (acoustic/gospel arrangement)
11. "Over You" (new arrangement)
12. "Stronger"
13. "Love the One You're With"
14. "Leave Right Now"
15. "In the Stone"
16. "You and I"
17. "Your Game"

== Special features ==
1. Will Young interview
2. Behind-the-scenes of the tour
3. "Friday's Child" music video
4. "Your Game" music video
5. "Leave Right Now" music video
6. Making of "Friday's Child", "Your Game" and "Leave Right Now"
7. Matador sequence
8. Clown sequence
