= Pretty Please (album) =

Studio album by Hector on Stilts
- Released: 2000
- Producer: Chris Burroughs

Hector on Stilts chronology
Pretty Please (2000)	hectoronstiltsEP (2002)

Pretty Please is the first album released by Hector on Stilts in 2000.

== Track listing ==
1. "Still Awake"
2. "Soul So Sweet"
3. "Rotten"
4. "La Flaca"
5. "J98"
6. "Dirty Days"
7. "Baby Girl"
8. "Fields"
9. "Love Song No. 5"
10. "Cincinnati"
11. "Passing By"
12. "Mi Chaqueta"
13. "What Am I Going To Do?"
14. "Hot Seat"
