= Hector on Stilts =

American indie pop and rock band

- Origin: Tucson, Arizona, United States
- Genres: Rock; Indie pop
- Years active: 1998–present
- Labels: Independent
- Members: Clayton Colwell; Jeb Colwell; Jennifer McCarron; John Brodeur
- Past members: Bruce Halper; Conor Meehan; Jay Schultheis; Adam Levy; Anders Johansson; Adam Michael Rothberg; Roger Mason
- Website: hectoronstilts.com

Hector on Stilts (HOS) is an American Indie pop/rock band. The band was originally formed in Tucson, Arizona, in 1998, and currently resides in Albany, New York.

== History ==
Hector on Stilts was formed by cousins Jeb and Clayton Colwell. The two started performing as teenagers in coffee houses throughout their hometown of Tucson before taking a break while both attended college. The Colwells were in part drawn east to Pittsfield, Massachusetts in 2001 due to the city's equidistant proximity to New York City and Boston, Massachusetts. It was while the Colwells were based in Pittsfield that current bassist Jenn McCarron and drummer John Brodeur joined the band. Prior to joining Hector on Stilts, Brodeur wrote a feature about the band for Albany alternative weekly newspaper Metroland. The band currently records and resides in Albany, New York.

== Band ==
=== Current members ===
- Clayton Colwell – guitar
- Jeb Colwell – guitar, synth
- Jennifer McCarron – bass
- John Brodeur – drums

=== National exposure ===
The song "Soul So Sweet" off of their album Same Height Relation was featured in the ABC television series Brothers and Sisters. Another song off the album Same Height Relation, "Heart In Your Hand," was featured in the ABC television series Three Moons Over Milford.

=== Origin of the name ===
Band members have readily admitted that there are numerous theories about the origin of the band's name. Clayton Colwell stated in a 2006 profile that he had forgotten how the name was selected mentioning theories related to a neighborhood resident named Hector who threw rocks at his dog, Jeb's brother possibly creating the name, and the definition of hector as "to bully." Colwell finally stated: "Sometimes I think it comes down to we pulled it out of a hat."

== Discography ==
- Pretty Please (album) (2000)
- hectoronstiltsEP (2002)
- Same Height Relation (2005)
- Announced online releases and album, 2007/2008
