= Charles Flores =

Cuban-American bassist

Charles Flores was born in Cuba in 1970. He became a bassist when he was 10 years old, but Cuban laws prohibited an in depth study of jazz and other American genres of music. Flores eventually immigrated to the United States as a refugee and settled in Hartford, Connecticut, where his wife, Miriam Flores, had relatives.

He joined the group Afro-Cuba, led by Emiliano Salvador, during his senior year in high school and later toured with the group in 1992 and 1993. He then joined the Isaac Delgado Group and appeared on some of their albums.

In 2002, Flores joined the Michel Camilo Trio, which consisted of Michel Camilo, Dafnis Prieto and Flores. He won a Grammy Award for Best Latin Jazz Album in 2004 for their album, Live at the Blue Note. Most recently, Flores performed on the trio's 2011 album, Mano A Mano. He stopped performing with the Michel Camilo Trio in November 2011 due to declining health.

Charles Flores died of complications of throat cancer on August 22, 2012, at the age of 41. Mayor Pedro Segarra of Hartford, Connecticut, Flores' adopted hometown, told reporters, "Charles' story of leaving his native Cuba to pursue his dream and passion for music was only surpassed by his talent and skill as a musician...Hartford has lost a giant in the world of jazz and my thoughts and prayers go out to the entire Flores family."
