= Slates (EP) =

EP by The Fall
- Released: 27 April 1981
- Recorded: February 1981
- Genre: Post-punk; art punk
- Length: 23:45
- Label: Rough Trade
- Producer: The Fall; Grant Showbiz; Mark E. Smith; Adrian Sherwood; Geoff Travis

The Fall chronology
Grotesque (After the Gramme) (1980)	Slates (1981)	Live in London 1980 (1982)

Slates is an EP by the English post-punk band the Fall, released on 27 April 1981 by Rough Trade Records. It was one of singer Mark E. Smith's favourite Fall releases, and he claimed it was aimed at "people who didn't buy records".

== Release ==
Slates was released on 27 April 1981. Containing six tracks and pressed onto 10" vinyl, it was eligible for neither the single nor album charts, being too long for the former and too short for the latter. It was, however, included in the UK Independent Singles chart, where it reached No. 3.

The six tracks include "Fit and Working Again", in which Smith comments on the working class work-ethic, and compares his state of mind to that of boxer Alan Minter after taking LSD, and "Leave the Capitol", which was seen as summing up Smith's negative view of London. The vinyl has etched on it "Keep shtum. Plagiarism infests the land".

Slates made its first appearance on CD in 1992 on the Dojo label, where it was coupled with live album A Part of America Therein, 1981, at the time these being two of the hardest Fall releases to find. This combined album was reissued in 1998 by Essential and in 2002 by Castle Communications. It was also reissued by Castle on CD with bonus tracks comprising the band's March 1981 Peel session, both tracks from the November 1981 "Lie Dream of a Casino Soul" single, and a studio outtake from the early 1980s, "Medical Acceptance Gate". Slates was reissued on its original 10-inch vinyl format in 2016 on the Superior Viaduct label.

== Reception ==
Professional ratings
Review scores
Source	Rating
AllMusic	4/5 stars
Christgau's Record Guide	B
Mojo	4/5 stars
The Rolling Stone Album Guide	3.5/5 stars
Spin Alternative Record Guide	10/10
Uncut	5/5 stars

Although it was a six-song EP, Slates still ranked number 13 among the "Albums of the Year" for 1981 by NME. AllMusic gave it four stars, with David Jeffries writing "Not a bad taster if you're new and want some post-punk, pre-pop Fall – and 90 percent of this is prime material." Trouser Press commented on the improvement in production compared to Grotesque (After the Gramme), calling it "A solid record of greater potential appeal than just to cultists."

In 1992, The Wire included the EP in its list of the "100 most important records ever made" with a blurb by Mark Sinker. Situated between the "callow punk-bandwagon promise and bad haircuts" of their early career and the "classic and even generically classic work" that would follow, Sinker wrote that Slates captures the Fall at the moment when "Mark E. Smith's unfooled bile seems perfectly dialectically visionary, wearily energised, utterly untimely: his un-musicality a higher music. 'Naive' anti-design sleeve design, rhythms that jerk along like speedheads addicted to paranoia side-effect; a guitar-sound jabbing barbs into your skin, razor-edge squeals into your head—Man With Chip's voice yabbers scarily on through a thick fog of textured noise."

Dave Simpson, in his book The Fallen, describes Slates: "Even more than Grotesque, Slates manages to skirt the boundaries of demented Northern rockabilly, experimental rock, and avant garde, but despite that manages to be insanely poppy".

Slates appeared at number 8 in the 2018 Billboard list "The 10 Best Albums by The Fall: Critic's Picks", with Geeta Dayal picking out "Leave the Capitol" as "one of Smith's most rocking and unforgettable songs...a tune that you could hear reverberating through rock and roll for decades to come".

== Track listing ==
Side A
No.	Title	Writer(s)	Length
1.	"Middle Mass"	Mark E. Smith, Marc Riley, Craig Scanlon, Steve Hanley	3:32
2.	"An Older Lover Etc."	Smith, Riley, Scanlon, S. Hanley, Paul Hanley	4:36
3.	"Prole Art Threat"	Smith, Riley	1:57

Side B
No.	Title	Writer(s)	Length
4.	"Fit and Working Again"	Smith, Riley, S. Hanley, P. Hanley	2:59
5.	"Slates, Slags, Etc."	Smith, Riley, Scanlon, S. Hanley, P. Hanley	6:34
6.	"Leave the Capitol"	Smith, Riley, Scanlon, S. Hanley	4:07

2004 CD reissue bonus tracks
No.	Title	Writer(s)	Length
7.	"Middle Mass" (Peel session)	Smith, Riley, Scanlon, S. Hanley	3:54
8.	"Lie Dream of a Casino Soul" (Peel session)	Smith, Riley, Scanlon, P. Hanley	2:42
9.	"Hip Priest" (Peel session)	Smith, Riley, Scanlon, S. Hanley	9:24
10.	"C'n'C - Hassle Schmuck" (Peel session)	Smith, Riley, Scanlon, S. Hanley	4:11
11.	"Lie Dream of a Casino Soul" (single A-side)	Smith, Riley, Scanlon, P. Hanley	3:09
12.	"Fantastic Life" (single B-side)	Smith, Riley, Scanlon, P. Hanley	5:21
13.	"Medical Acceptance Gate" (outtake)	The Fall	3:25

== Personnel ==
Adapted from the album liner notes.

The Fall

- Mark E. Smith – vocals, piano, harmonica
- Marc Riley – electric guitar, electric piano, vocals
- Craig Scanlon – electric and acoustic guitars, piano (credited as 'Craig Scanlan')
- Steve Hanley – bass guitar, acoustic guitar, vocals
- Paul Hanley – drums, percussion

Additional personnel

- Kay Carroll – vocals, kazoo
- Dave Tucker – vocals, clarinet

Technical

- The Fall – production (1, 3–6)
- Grant Showbiz – production (2-6)
- Adrian Sherwood – production (1)
- Geoff Travis – production (1)
- Mark E. Smith – production (2)
- Nobby Turner – engineering
- Bob – engineering
