= Guacimara =

Guacimara is the name of a strong warrior Guanche woman, daughter of the king or Mencey of the Menceyato of Anaga in the Canary Islands, at a time prior to the arrival of the European conquerors at the end of the XV century.

It appears for the first time as a personage in Antonio de Viana's epic poem Antigüedades de las Islas Afortunadas published in 1604, from which it was copied by authors like Tomás Arias Marín de Cubas or José de Viera y Clavijo, so that there is no evidence of it being historical.

In the poem, Guacimara was the daughter of the historical ruler Beneharo and his only heir, although the physician Juan Bethencourt Alfonso added that Beneharo had two other brothers: a boy, baptized Enrique and Guajara, wife of Tinguaro.
