= Xiomara De Oliver =

- Born: 1967 (age 58–59); Grand Forks, Canada
- Other name: Ziomara De Oliver
- Education: California State University, Sacramento and New York University

Xiomara De Oliver (born 1967) is a Canadian-born black artist. She is known for her paintings, which explore the concerns of Black women. She is based in Marina del Rey, California.

== Early life and education ==
Xiomara De Oliver was born in 1967 in Grand Forks, British Columbia, in Canada. She attended California State University, Sacramento, and graduated in 1988 with a degree in criminal law. In 1997, De Oliver graduated with a degree in studio art and environmental art from New York University (NYU). In 2006, De Oliver was the recipient of a Joan Mitchell Foundation grant.

== Career ==
De Oliver's artwork explores the physical and political condition of black and African American women. She often paints in an abstract expressionist-style. Her work is included in public museum collections including Museum of Modern Art, and the Studio Museum in Harlem.
