= Xiomara Reyes =

Cuban ballet dancer

- Born: October 28, 1973 (age 53); Havana, Cuba
- Education: Havana Vocational School of Ballet; Cuban National Ballet School
- Occupation: dance instructor
- Spouse: Rinat Imaev

Xiomara Reyes (born October 28, 1973, in Havana, Cuba) is a former principal dancer with American Ballet Theatre. After retiring from performing she was appointed the Head of School of The Washington Ballet School.

== Training and career ==
Born in Cuba, Reyes trained at Havana Vocational School of Ballet and the Cuban National Ballet School, where she studied with Loipa Araujo. While in school, Reyes performed lead roles in The Three Musketeers at 15, Don Quixote at 16, and Coppelia at 17. Following graduation, she danced as a soloist with La Joven Guardia, the second company of Cuban National Ballet, under the direction of Laura Alonso who continued to cast her in leading roles with the ensemble. Soon afterwards she joined Cuban National Ballet. In 1994, after two years with the company, she was invited to perform as Giselle with the Royal Ballet of Flanders. Reyes accepted the offer and spent her next seven years dancing in Belgium, rising to the rank of first soloist. During this period Reyes was a frequent participant in major ballet competitions throughout the world resulting in her winning the gold medal for the Best Soloist at the International Ballet Competition of Chiclayo, Peru; Best Couple Prize at the XIV International Ballet Competition Varna; Silver Medal at the Cinquième Concours International de Danse de Paris; and Second Prize at the International Ballet Competition of Luxembourg. She also performed with Jeune Ballet de France, Balleto Del Sud, Nafsika Dance Theater, the International Dance Festival in Korea, Bashkirian State Ballet, and with numerous companies throughout Europe and The United States.

== Career with ABT ==
In 2001, Reyes was invited to join American Ballet Theatre as a Guest Artist, after which she was appointed a soloist with the company. In 2003, following a succession of rave reviews and major role debuts - including from The New York Times' Jennifer Dunning for her performance as Kitri alongside Angel Corrella in Don Quixote - Reyes was promoted to principal dancer. During her time at ABT, her regular partner was Herman Cornejo, though she also danced alongside Julio Bocca, Jose Manuel Carreno, Vladimir Malakhov, Ivan Vasiliev, and Gennadi Saveliev.

While with the company, Reyes was noted for dancing a diverse repertoire which included a leading role in Allegro Brillante, Nikiya and a Shade in La Bayadère, the first and fourth movements in Bruch Violin Concerto No. 1, Cinderella in Cinderella, Swanilda in Coppélia, Medora, Gulnare, and an Odalisque in Le Corsaire, a leading role in Désir, Who Was She? in Dim Lustre, Kitri and Amour in Don Quixote, Sibyl in Dorian, Titania in The Dream, Anne in Christopher Wheeldon's VIII, Lise in La Fille mal gardée, the peasant pas de deux, Moyna, and Giselle in Giselle, Le Grand Pas de Deux, His Memory and His Experiences in Here After, the Two of Diamonds in Jeu de Cartes, Prudence in Lady of the Camellias, Manon in Manon, Valencienne in The Merry Widow, Clara and the Sugar Plum Fairy in The Nutcracker, the Debutante in Offenbach in the Underworld, Desdemona is Othello, Olga in Onegin, the Ballerina in Petrouchka, the Youngest Sister in Pillar of Fire, Raymonda in Raymonda, the Cowgirl in Rodeo, Juliet in Romeo and Juliet, Princess Aurora and Princess Florine in The Sleeping Beauty, the Young Girl in Le Spectre de la Rose, Zina in The Bright Stream, the pas de trois and the Hungarian Princess in Swan Lake, the third movement in Symphony in C, the Tchaikovsky Pas de Deux, and leading roles in Brief Fling, The Brahms-Haydn Variations, Clear, Études, Glow - Stop, The Leaves Are Fading, Overgrown Path, Petite Mort and Without Words. Additionally she created leading roles in Alexei Ratmansky's Seven Sonatas and Ann Reinking's Within You Without You: A Tribute to George Harrison.

Of her performances alongside Herman Cornejo with ABT in London, Mark Monahan wrote for The Daily Telegraph, "Accompanied by the bewitching Xiomara Reyes – spring-loaded ballon, gossamer hands – he unleashes a fearsome barrage of grand technical brilliance, as controlled as it is exuberant. Together, this extraordinary hispanic duo make the Tchaikovsky Pas de Deux blaze from the stage – you grin helplessly, and can barely resist the impulse to get up and join them." Clement Crisp, writing for The Financial Times commented, "I much admired the way Xiomara Reyes and Herman Cornejo dealt with the ensuing Tchaikovsky pas de deux by Balanchine, which was to take no prisoners. Bravura. Lots of pirouettes; lots of steps cut dazzlingly in the air; lots of charm. And lots and lots of deserved applause."

Oksana Khadarina, writing for Dance Tabs noted, "Watching the performance of Xiomara Reyes in the main role, I kept thinking that ABT is about to bid farewell to the finest Cowgirl in the company’s history. Over the years, the Cuban-born ballerina put an indelible stamp on this role, making it truly her own." In his review of her performance in Cinderalla, The New York Times Chief Dance Critic, Alastair MacAulay effused that, "Xiomara Reyes, on Saturday afternoon, was technically adept at every moment. She was at her most individual in the Act III kitchen solo. In one phrase — a pair of quick jumps and a rapid run on point — all other Cinderellas are jubilant and rapturous, yet Ms. Reyes delivered it frowningly, as if protesting her current situation, a most effective contrast to the sweeter memories that followed."

In 2010, Reyes returned to Cuba for the first time in 18 years to perform with ABT as part of the 22nd Havana International Dance Festival. The occasion marked the first time that the company had visited Cuba in 50 years.

== Retirement ==
In 2015, Reyes retired from American Ballet Theatre after celebrating 14 years with the company. She delivered her final performance on May 27, 2015, in Giselle alongside Herman Cornejo as Albrecht at Metropolitan Opera.

Prior to stepping down from ABT, she gave an interview to HuffPost in which she lamented the impact of social media on dance:

"With Facebook, Instagram, Twitter and other media, dancers have new opportunities to be noticed and, while I think these are wonderful outlets that give more people the opportunity to follow dancers whom they might never see perform live, I also believe it may be overwhelming for a young dancer who is trying to find her own voice. Social media can become a rat race. Dance is not only an external endeavor but also an internal search... Our need for exposure, this thirst for communication and public recognition, has a tendency to push us outward before we work inward. To a young dancer I would say: be aware of that trap. Take the time to find out what dancing really means to you, how it shapes you as a human being. Nourish yourself with the art you create - explore what that means. And then: dance, live, share!"

Following her retirement, Reyes was appointed director of The Washington Ballet's school by her former fellow principal dancer Julie Kent. Kent - who retired from ABT during the same month as Reyes - had recently assumed command of the company. Reyes' husband, Rinat Imaev - a former principal dancer with Royal Ballet of Flanders and Sofia National Ballet, as well as a former company teacher at ABT - joined her in leading the school as a senior faculty member.

== Selected repertoire ==
- Sleeping Beauty (Aurora)
- Manon (title role)
- Romeo and Juliet (Juliet)
- Cinderella (title role)
- Cinderella (Autumn)
- Le Corsaire (Gulnare)
- Le Corsaire (Odalisque)
- Dorian (Sibyl)
- Don Quixote (Kitri)
- Don Quixote (Amour)
- La Fille Mal Gardée (Lise)
- Giselle (Title role)
- Giselle (Peasant pas de deux)
- Giselle (Moyna)
- The Merry Widow (Valencienne)
- The Nutcracker (Clara)
- The Nutcracker (Sugar Plum Fairy)
- Raymonda (Title role)
- The Dream (Titania)
- Othello (Desdemona)
- The Bright Stream (Zina)
- Offenbach in the Underworld (Debutante)
- Pillar of Fire (Youngest sister)
- The Sleeping Beauty (Princess Florine, in the Blue Bird pas de deux)
- The Sleeping Beauty (Diamond variation)
- Swan Lake (Pas de trois)
- Swan Lake (Hungarian Princess)
- La Bayadère (shade)
- Rodeo (Girl in the yellow dress)
- Petrouchka (Ballerina)
- Symphony in C
- Tchaikovsky Pas de deux
- Within You Without You: A Tribute to George Harrison
- Diana and Acteon (Pas de deux)
- HereAfter
- Bruch Violin Concerto No. 1
- Dim Lustre
- Jeu de cartes (Two of Diamonds)
- Petit Mort
- Gong
- Clear
- Without Words
- Etudes
- Lady of the Camellias
