= Solo (Michel Camilo album) =

Studio album by Michel Camilo
- Released: 2005
- Recorded: May 2004
- Genre: Jazz
- Label: Telarc

Solo is a piano album by Michel Camilo. It was recorded in 2004 and released by Telarc in 2005.

== Recording and music ==
The album of solo piano performances was recorded in May 2004. One reviewer commented that the recording was done "in a close and immediate manner so intimate you'll think the pianist is in your living room." Of the twelve tracks, four are Brazilian, four are standards, and four are Camilo compositions.

== Release and reception ==
Professional ratings
Review scores
| Source | Rating |
|---|---|
| The Penguin Guide to Jazz Recordings | 4/4 stars |

Solo was released by Telarc in 2005. The AllMusic reviewer wrote: "Although Solo does not quite generate the same amount of excitement as Camilo's often-classic trio dates, he plays beautifully throughout." The Penguin Guide to Jazz Recordings also compared it with Camilo's trio recordings: "the percussive energy he conjures up with a rhythm section is largely missing and some of these sound suspiciously like rehearsal musings."

== Track listing ==
1. "A Dream"
2. "Minha (All Mine)"
3. "Our Love Is Here to Stay"
4. "Reflections"
5. "Luiza"
6. "'Round Midnight"
7. "Atras Da Porta"
8. "Someone to Watch Over Me"
9. "Un Son"
10. "The Frim Fram Sauce"
11. "Corcovado (Quiet Nights)"
12. "Suntan"

== Personnel ==
- Michel Camilo – piano
