= Xiomara Zelaya =

Honduran politician (born 1985)

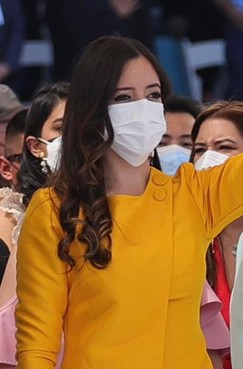
- Zelaya at her mother's inauguration in 2022

Member of the National Congress
- Incumbent
- Assumed office 25 January 2022
- Constituency: Francisco Morazán Department

Personal details
- Born: 14 January 1985 (age 41) Catacamas, Olancho, Honduras
- Party: Liberty and Refoundation
- Parents: Manuel Zelaya (father); Xiomara Castro (mother)
- Education: EAE Business university (BC)

Xiomara Hortencia Zelaya Castro (born 14 January 1985) is a Honduran politician and member of the National Congress. She is the daughter of Manuel Zelaya and Xiomara Castro, who were the 35th and 39th president of Honduras respectively. She is popularly known by her nickname "Pichu".

Zelaya was a potential presidential candidate in 2021, however, she chose to run for a deputy.
