= Xiomara Laugart =

Cuban singer

Xiomara Laugart Sánchez is a Cuban singer currently based in New York City. Before emigrating to the United States, Laugart had an extensive career performing nueva trova music in Cuba and she has recorded over 17 albums.

== Early life ==
Xiomara Laugart was born in the Guantanamo province of Cuba. She attended college and pursued a degree in Economics, then began her musical career through the nueva trova musical political protest movement, which was popular throughout the 1960s and 1990s.

== 2003–05: Yerba Buena ==
Originally based in New York, Laugart was a founding member and lead singer of the Afro-Latin band, Yerba Buena.

== 2007–08: Celia: The Life and Music of Celia Cruz ==
In 2007, Laugart was cast as Celia Cruz in the Off-Broadway musical, Celia: The Life and Music of Celia Cruz, a tribute to the life of the late Cuban-American singer. Celia ran at New World Stages in New York, New York from September 26, 2007 until May 25, 2008. During that tour period, the musical made stops at: Chicago, Los Angeles, Miami, Dallas, Washington, D.C., and Boston, as well as a South American tour. The musical won four Hispanic Organization of Latin Actors (HOLA) awards in 2008.

== Discography ==
- Fé (Self released, 1990)
- Xiomara (Chesky, 2006)
- La Voz (Chesky, 2010)
- Tears and Rumba (Chesky, 2015)

With Yerba Buena

- President Alien (2003)
- Island Life (2005)

== See also ==
- Cuban music
- Yerba Buena (band)
