= Cliff Almond (musician) =

American drummer and percussion player

- Born: Tallahassee, Florida, U.S.
- Origin: San Diego, California, U.S.
- Genres: Jazz; latin jazz; pop; rock
- Occupation: Musician
- Instrument: Drums
- Years active: 1980s–present
- Website: www.cliffalmond.com

Cliff Almond is an American drummer, session musician, and drum set educator. He is a long-time collaborator of jazz pianist Michel Camilo, having frequently appeared on Camilo's tours and recordings since joining his group at the age of 21.

Based in New York City, Almond has built an accomplished career as a session musician, working with artists such as Wayne Krantz, Chris Potter, Patti LaBelle, The Manhattan Transfer, Michael Brecker, Mike Stern, and Terrence Blanchard. Almond also maintains a presence in Japan, where he has toured and recorded with high-profile artists including Quruli, Akiko Yano, and Hikaru Utada.

As an educator, Almond has held clinics internationally and maintains an educational website, Cliff Almond Masterclasses.
