= Norman Chesky =

- Occupations: Executive music producer, president of Chesky Records and HDtracks

Norman Chesky is a music entrepreneur and executive producer of two Grammy Award winning albums. He is the co-founder and co-owner of Manhattan Production Music and Chesky Records. Chesky also co-founded HDtracks, a music download service. He was a Trustee of the Recording Academy and is a co-founding member of the Production Music Association (PMA).

== Career ==
Chesky co-founded and co-owns Manhattan Production Music. He served as a Trustee of the Recording Academy from 2002 to 2007.

=== Chesky Records ===
In 1986, Norman Chesky and his brother, David Chesky, co-founded Chesky Records. Norman Chesky serves as the president of the record label. Chesky Records was the first company to use 128x Oversampling and the first independent American record label to record using Digital Versatile Disc (DVD) technology. Norman Chesky was the executive producer of Portraits of Cuba and Tropicana Nights, two Grammy Award winning albums under Chesky Records. In 2016, Chesky co-produced the critically acclaimed Jazz debut of Macy Gray, Stripped.

=== Production Music Association ===
Norman Chesky became a co-founding member of the Production Music Association in 1997. The association was founded by a group of composers and publishers who opposed a proposition to cap performance royalties on music used in commercials, promos and announcements.

=== HDtracks ===
Norman Chesky and David Chesky co-founded HDtracks, a high-resolution music download store in 2008. According to Audioholics, HDtracks is the world's first high resolution digital music site to offer DRM-free music in multiple formats. Norman Chesky serves HDtracks' president.

== Discography ==
- 2017 Orchestra of the 21st Century - David Chesky: Piano Concertos 2 & 3
- 2017 Camille Thurman - Inside the Moment
- 2017 Mark Whitfield - Live & Uncut
- 2017 Livingston Taylor - Safe Home
- 2017 Shelly Berg / David Finck - The Deep
- 2016 Various - Covers II
- 2016 David Chesky - The Venetian Concertos
- 2016 Noah Wall - Down Home Blues
- 2016 Melissa Menago - Little Crimes
- 2016 John McEuen - Made in Brooklyn
- 2016 Amber Rubarth - Scribbled Folk Symphonies
- 2016 Macy Gray - Stripped
- 2016 City of the Sun - To the Sun and All the Cities in Between
- 2016 Three's Company - We'll Be Together Again
- 2015 Chelsea Symphony / Yaniv Segal - David Chesky: Joy & Sorrow
- 2015 Mangue Sylla & the All-Star Drummers of Guinea - Dunnun Kan
- 2015 The New Appalachians - From the Mountaintop
- 2015 Powerhouse / Powerhouse / Wallace Roney - In an Ambient Way
- 2015 Kenny Barron / Mark Sherman - Interplay
- 2014 Alexis Cole - A Kiss In the Dark
- 2014 Jimmy Greene - Beautiful Life
- 2014 David Chesky - Jazz in the New Harmonic: Primal Scream
- 2014 Candido - The Master
- 2014 Bucky Pizzarelli - Three for All
- 2013 CC Coletti - Bring It on Home: Sings the American Roots of Zeppelin
- 2013 Jamey Haddad / Mark Sherman/ Lenny White - Explorations of Space and Time
- 2013 David Hazeltine - Impromptu
- 2013 David Chesky - Jazz in the New Harmonic
- 2013 David Chesky - The New York Rags
- 2012 Wycliffe Gordon - Dreams of New Orleans
- 2012 Amber Rubarth - Sessions from the 17th Ward
- 2011 David Chesky - Urbanicity; Concerto for Electric Guitar and Orchestra; The New York Variations
- 2010 Various - Best of New York Sessions, Vol. 2
- 2010 Louise Rogers - Black Coffee
- 2010 Beat Kaestli - Invitation
- 2010 Xiomara Laugart - La Voz
- 2009 Monty Alexander - Calypso Blues: The Songs of Nat King Cole
- 2009 Jimmy Cobb - Jazz in the Key of Blue
- 2009 Jen Chapin - Revisions: The Songs of Stevie Wonder
- 2009 John Hammond - Rough & Tough
- 2008 George Colligan / Lenny White / Buster Williams / Steve Wilson - Hancock Island: The Music of Herbie Hancock
- 2008 Larry Coryell - Impressions: The New York Sessions
- 2008 Seamus Blake / Ari Hoenig / Mike Moreno / Sam Yahel - Jazz Side of the Moon: Music of Pink Floyd
- 2008 Paquito D'Rivera - Spice It Up! The Best of Paquito d'Rivera
- 2008 Monty Alexander - The Good Life: Monte Alexander Plays the Songs of Tony Bennett
- 2008 Various - The Ultimate Demonstration Disc, Vol. 2
- 2007 Various - Best of New York Sessions, Vol. 1
- 2007 Jimmy Cobb - Cobb's Corner
- 2007 John Hicks - On the Wings of an Eagle
- 2007 Various - Romance in Rio [Chesky]
- 2007 Javon Jackson - Sugar Hill: Music of Duke Ellington and Billy Strayhorn
- 2007 David Hazeltine - The Jobim Songbook in New York
- 2007 Valerie Joyce - The Look of Love: Music of Burt Bacharach
- 2007 David Chesky - Urban Concertos
- 2006 Various - Chesky 20th Anniversary
- 2006 Various - Live from Studio A
- 2006 Hazeltine-Mraz Trio - Manhattan
- 2006 Billy Burnette - Memphis in Manhattan
- 2006 Nicholas Payton - Mysterious Shorter
- 2006 Christian McBride - New York Time
- 2006 Fred Hersch - Personal Favorites
- 2006 Carlos Franzetti - Songs for Lovers
- 2006 Badi Assad - The Badi Assad Collection: The Best of Badi
- 2006 Larry Coryell - Traffic
- 2006 Hank Jones - West of 5th
- 2006 Various - World's Greatest Audiophile Vocal Recordings
- 2006 Xiomara Laugart - Xiomara
- 2005 Babatunde Olatunji - Circle of Drums
- 2005 Area 31 - David Chesky: Area 31
- 2005 Victor Bailey / Larry Coryell / Lenny White - Electric
- 2005 Marta Gomez - Entre Cada Palabra
- 2005 Rachel Z - Grace
- 2005 Various - Jazz Latinas
- 2005 Valerie Joyce - New York Blue
- 2005 Various - Rockin' the Spirit: Piano Blues, Boogie & Spirituals
- 2005 Paquito D'Rivera - The Jazz Chamber Trio
- 2005 Carlos Franzetti - The Jazz Kamerata
- 2005 The Persuasions - The Persuasions Sing U2
- 2004 Carla Lother - 100 Lovers
- 2004 52nd Street Blues Project - Blues & Grass
- 2004 Marta Gomez - Cantos de Agua Dulce (Songs of the Sweet Water)
- 2004 David Chesky - Dr. Chesky's Magnificent, Fabulous, Absurd and Insane Musical 5.1 Surround Show
- 2004 Ana Caram - Hollywood Rio
- 2004 Hot Club Of 52nd Street - Hot Club of 52nd Street
- 2004 Candido & Graciela - Inolvidable [Hybrid]
- 2004 Various - Night Songs She Sings
- 2004 Christy Baron - Retrospective
- 2004 The Body Acoustic - The Body Acoustic
- 2004 Bruckner Orchester Linz - The Essence of Viennese Music
- 2003 The Persuasions - A Cappella Dreams
- 2003 Ars Antiqua Austria - Biber, Schmelzer: Seventeenth Century Music and Dance from the Viennese Court
- 2003 Ron Carter / Rosa Passos - Entre Amigos
- 2003 Various - Jazz Sexy
- 2003 Bernhard Klee - Orchestral Spectacular
- 2003 Rebecca Pidgeon - Retrospective
- 2003 John Abercrombie / Badi Assad/ Larry Coryell - Three Guitars
- 2002 Ron Carter / Jimmy Cobb / George Coleman / Mike Stern - Four Generations of Miles: A Live Tribute to Miles
- 2002 Dennis Russell Davies - Gustav Holst: The Planets
- 2002 David Johansen & the Harry Smiths - Shaker
- 2002 Christy Baron - Take This Journey
- 2002 Caspar Richter - The Musical Goes Symphonic
- 2002 The Persuasions - The Persuasions Sing the Beatles
- 2002 Bernhard Klee - Wagner & Verdi: Great Opera Choruses
- 2001 Ana Caram - Blue Bossa
- 2001 The Conga Kings - Jazz Descargas
- 2001 Lee Konitz - Parallels
- 2001 Various - Singer Songwriters
- 2001 Bucky Pizzarelli - Swing Live
- 2001 Raul Jaurena - Tango Bar [Chesky]
- 2001 Sara K. - What Matters
- 2000 Various - Chesky 2K: Sampler
- 2000 David Chesky - Chesky: Psalms 4, 5 & 6
- 2000 Candido - Conga Kings
- 2000 Larry Coryell - Coryells
- 2000 David Chesky - The Agnostic
- 2000 David Johansen & the Harry Smiths - David Johansen & the Harry Smiths
- 2000 Chuck Mangione - Everything for Love
- 2000 Clark Terry - One on One
- 2000 Christy Baron - Steppin'
- 1999 Carla Lother - Ephemera
- 1999 Various - Jazz for a Literary Mind
- 1999 Sara K. - No Cover
- 1999 Chuck Mangione - The Feeling's Back
- 1999 Allison Brewster Franzetti - The Unknown Piazzolla
- 1999 Paquito D'Rivera - Tropicana Nights
- 1998 Rebecca Pidgeon - Four Marys [Video]
- 1998 Ars Antiqua Austria / Gunar Letzbor / St. Florianer Sängerknaben - Mozart: Grabmusik KV. 42; Galimathais musicum KV. 32
- 1998 Ana Caram - Postcards from Rio
- 1998 Jon Faddis - Remembrances
- 1998 Dave's True Story - Sex Without Bodies
- 1998 Dave's True Story - Sex Without Bodies [Video]
- 1998 Rebecca Pidgeon - The Four Marys
- 1997 Various - Classical Cats: A Children's Introduction to the Orchestra
- 1997 David Chesky - David Chesky: Three Psalms for String Orchestra
- 1997 Badi Assad - Echoes of Brazil
- 1997 Sara K. - Hobo
- 1997 Christy Baron - I Thought About You
- 1997 Livingston Taylor - Ink
- 1997 Babatunde Olatunji - Love Drum Talk
- 1997 Various - Stereo Review: Gold Stereo & Surround Set Up
- 1997 Various - The Best of Brasil [Chesky]
- 1997 John Basile - The Desmond Project
- 1997 Charles Gerhardt - Wagner: Orchestral Music
- 1997 Various - Women of Song [Chesky]
- 1996 Phil Woods - Astor & Elis
- 1996 Ars Antiqua Austria - Bach: Four Orchestral Suites
- 1996 Martin Sieghart - Franz Schmidt: Symphony No. 4
- 1996 Various - Guitar Collection
- 1996 Carlos Heredia - Gypsy Flamenco
- 1996 Joseph Flummerfelt / Westminster Choir - Lika As a Hart: Psalms & Spiritual Songs
- 1996 I Ching - Of the Marsh and the Moon
- 1996 John Pizzarelli - One Night with You
- 1996 Paquito D'Rivera - Portraits of Cuba
- 1996 Various - Tenth Anniversary Special Edition
- 1996 David Chesky - The Fantasies
- 1996 Rebecca Pidgeon - The New York Girls' Club
- 1995 Oregon - Beyond Words
- 1995 Ana Caram - Bossa Nova
- 1995 Benita Meshulam - Granados: Goyescas
- 1995 Various - Great American Composers [Chesky]
- 1995 Gary Schocker - Mozart: The Flute Quartets
- 1995 Ahn Trio - Paris Rio
- 1995 Badi Assad - Rhythms
- 1995 Various - Stereophile Test CD, Vol. 3
- 1995 Sara K. - Tell Me I'm Not Dreamin'
- 1995 Various - The Classical Collection
- 1995 Various - The Ultimate Demonstration Disc
- 1994 René Leibowitz - Beethoven: Symphonies Nos. 6 "Pastoral" & 8
- 1994 Jascha Horenstein - Brahms: Symphony No. 1; Wagner: Der fliegende Holländer Overture; Tannhäuser Bacchanale
- 1994 LaVerne Butler - Day Dreamin'
- 1994 Johnny Frigo - Debut of a Legend
- 1994 Fred Hersch - Fred Hersch Trio Plays...
- 1994 John Barbirolli - Jean Sibelius: Symphony No. 2 in D major, Op. 43
- 1994 Charles Gerhardt - Light Classics, Vol. 2
- 1994 Leny Andrade - Maiden Voyage
- 1994 Clark Terry - Portraits
- 1994 Earl Wild - Rachmaninoff: Concerto No. 2; The Isle Of The Dead
- 1994 Eddie Daniels - Real Time
- 1994 Badi Assad - Solo
- 1994 Various - The Best of Chesky Classics & Jazz and Audiophile Test Disk, Vol. 3
- 1994 Various - The French Collection
- 1994 Rebecca Pidgeon - The Raven
- 1993 Massimo Freccia / Rudolf Kempe - Berlioz: Symphonie Fantastique; Richard Strauss: Don Juan
- 1993 Cephas & Wiggins - Bluesmen
- 1993 Earl Wild - Chopin: Piano Concerto No. 1; Fauré: Ballade; Liszt: Piano Concerto No. 1
- 1993 Livingston Taylor - Good Friends
- 1993 Malcolm Sargent - Handel: Messiah
- 1993 Ana Caram - Maracana
- 1993 Peggy Lee - Moments Like This
- 1993 Sara K. - Play on Words
- 1993 Orquesta Nova - Salon New York
- 1993 Jascha Horenstein - Strauss: Waltzes, Vol. 2: The Return of Horenstein
- 1993 Various - Symphonic Music of Cesar Franck
- 1993 Various - Tchaikovsky: Swan Lake Suite; Symphony No. 5
- 1993 Various - The German Album
- 1993 Bruce Dunlap - The Rhythm of Wings
- 1993 Tom Harrell - Upswing
- 1992 Various - A Night of Chesky Jazz Live at Town Hall: JVC Jazz Festival
- 1992 Bruce Dunlap - About Home
- 1992 Ana Caram - Amazonia
- 1992 René Leibowitz - Beethoven: Symphonies Nos. 1 & 3
- 1992 René Leibowitz - Beethoven: Symphonies Nos. 4 & 7
- 1992 René Leibowitz - Beethoven: Symphony No. 9
- 1992 Monty Alexander - Caribbean Circle
- 1992 Sara K. - Closer Than They Appear
- 1992 Fred Hersch - Dancing in the Dark
- 1992 National Philharmonic Orchestra - Hollywood Screen Classics
- 1992 Mongo Santamaria - Mambo Mongo [Chesky]
- 1992 LaVerne Butler - No Looking Back
- 1992 Earl Wild - Rachmaninov: Concerto No. 3; MacDowell: Concerto No. 2
- 1992 Lubambo/Rubello - Shades of Rio
- 1992 Jascha Horenstein - Strauss: Waltzes
- 1992 Various - The Best of Chesky Jazz, Vol. 2
- 1992 David Chesky - The Tangos and Dances
- 1992 Igor Kipnis - The Virtuoso Scarlatti
- 1992 Red Rodney - Then and Now
- 1992 Igor Kipnis - Vivaldi: The Four Seasons; Flute Concerto in D "Il Gardellino"; Harpsichord Concerto in A major
- 1991 Raymond Lewenthal - A Gershwin Concert
- 1991 René Leibowitz - A Portrait of France
- 1991 René Leibowitz - An Evening of Opera
- 1991 Kenny Rankin - Because of You
- 1991 Malcolm Frager / Erich Gruenberg - Beethoven: Concerto for Violin & Orchestra; Schumann: Concerto for Piano & Orchestra
- 1991 Earl Wild - Earl Wild plays Grieg, Säint-Saens & Liszt
- 1991 Fred Hersch - Forward Motion
- 1991 Gary Schocker - Gary Schocker Plays Bach, Handel, Telemann
- 1991 Paquito D'Rivera - Havana Cafe
- 1991 Clark Terry - Live at the Village Gate
- 1991 Orquesta Nova - Orquesta Nova
- 1991 Tom Harrell - Passages
- 1990 Gina Bachauer - Brahms: Piano Concerto No. 2
- 1990 Herbie Mann - Caminho De Casa
- 1990 Various - Chesky Records Jazz Sampler & Audiophile Test Compact Disc, Vol. 1
- 1990 Clark Terry - Live at the Village Gate: Second Set
- 1990 John Pizzarelli - My Blue Heaven
- 1990 Natasha - Natasha
- 1990 Earl Wild - Rachmaninov: Concertos Nos. 1 & 4; Rhapsody, Op. 43
- 1990 Charles Gerhardt - Richard Strauss: Der Rosenkavalier Suite; Ravel: Bolero; Tchaikovsky: Romeo and Juliet Overture-Fantasy
- 1990 David Chesky - The New York Chorinhos
- 1989 David Chesky - Club de Sol
- 1989 Jascha Horenstein - Dvorák: Symphony No. 9; Wagner: The Flying Dutchman; Siegfried-Idyll
- 1989 Phil Woods - Here's to My Lady
- 1989 Johnny Frigo - Live from Studio A in New York City
- 1989 Luiz Bonfá - Non-Stop to Brazil
- 1989 Paquito D'Rivera - Tico! Tico!
- 1988 Charles Gerhardt - Mozart: Symphonies Nos. 41 & 35; Haydn: Symphony No. 104
- 1988 Earl Wild - Tchaikovsky: Piano Concerto No. 1
- 1988 Itzhak Perlman / Alfred Wallenstein - Tchaikovsky: Violin Concerto, Op. 35
- 1988 Jascha Horenstein - Wagner: Bacchanale; Brahms: Symphony No. 1
- 1987 Charles Munch - Bizet: Symphony in C
- 1987 Fritz Reiner - Brahms: Symphony No. 4; Beethoven: Egmont Overture
- 1987 Earl Wild - Rachmaninoff: Piano Concerto No. 2; Isle of the Dead
- 1987 John Barbirolli - Sibelius: Symphony No. 2
- 1987 Ransom Wilson - Stravinsky: Histoire du soldat
