= Miami Beach Senior High School =

Secondary school in Miami Beach, Florida

Coordinates: 25.79850°N 80.13359°W

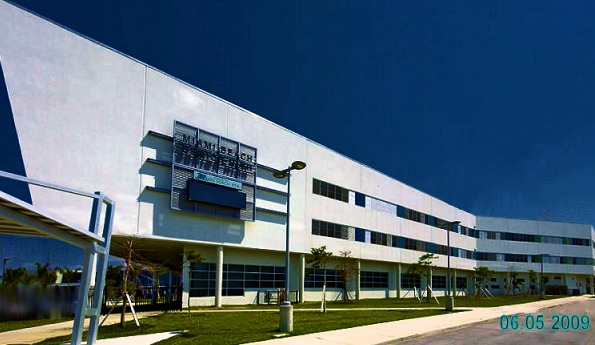
- Miami Beach Senior High School in June 2009

Location
- 2231 Prairie Avenue, Miami Beach, Florida, U.S. Miami Beach, Florida 33139; United States

Information
- Type: Public magnet
- Motto: Hi-Tide Pride
- Established: Original campus: July 1924; Old campus: September 1958; New campus: April 22, 2010
- School district: Miami-Dade County Public Schools
- Principal: Al Torossian (2022–present)
- Teaching staff: 85.00 (FTE)
- Grades: 9–12
- Enrollment: 2,168 (2023–2024)
- Student to teacher ratio: 23.90
- Colors: Scarlet and silver
- Athletics conference: District 14-6A
- Mascot: Hi-Tide Harry
- Nickname: Hi-Tides
- Newspaper: Beachcomber
- Yearbook: Typhoon & Hi-Tide
- School grade: B (as of 2019-present)
- Website: miamibeachseniorhigh.net

Miami Beach Senior High School (Beach High, MBSH) is a secondary school located at 2231 Prairie Avenue Miami Beach, Florida, across from the Miami Beach Convention Center and Botanical Garden. It is located at the corner of Prairie Avenue and Dade Boulevard. The school is in Miami-Dade County and is part of the Miami-Dade County Public Schools, the fourth-largest school district in the United States. In addition, Miami Beach Senior High is the second oldest in Miami-Dade County (after Miami Senior High School). In 2009, the school was recognized as a magnet school.

In 2010, Miami Beach Senior High was recognized as an International Baccalaureate World School, meaning a select group of students get to attend a two-year program that allows them to graduate with a special diploma. The school was the first in the city of Miami Beach to receive the designation.

== History ==
=== 20th century ===
Miami Beach High School opened in 1926. It was originally located at 1424 Drexel Avenue, in the heart of the South Beach district. It is the second-oldest high school in Miami-Dade County behind Miami Senior High School, which was founded in 1903. It was designed by August Geiger.

Carl Fisher provided the funds for the purchase of the land. For the first nine years of the school, it was named after Carl's mother, Ida M. Fisher. (Mrs. Fisher's middle initial was not "M", and the use of that letter was due to a typographer's error. Carl did not care and was so pleased that the school had been named for his mother that he stated the incorrect letter did not make a difference to him.)

The school's first principal was C. C. Carson. The first class motto was: "Let us be known for our deeds." At that time, the school's nickname was the Typhoons, but this name was changed after its 1960 move to its new location at 2231 Prairie Avenue, about a block north of the South Beach district.

Under a forced desegregation order from the Florida Supreme Court, Miami Beach High underwent desegregation efforts.

Prior to the opening of North Miami Beach High School and Dr. Michael Krop High School, students from North Miami Beach were assigned to Miami Beach High School and Miami Norland High School.

The original building at 14th and Drexel Avenue is now part of the Fienberg-Fisher K-8 Center compound. The school is being renovated and new buildings added to replace the demolished ones.

In the late 1990s, Beach High adopted ID numbers for every student in the school along with school ID cards following an incident in 1995 with a gang member on campus who was not a student at the school. Soon after, every other school in Miami-Dade followed suit.

A new building that opened in 1999 was plagued with defects in the construction. Students were not permitted to use the lockers, and rain caused damage to school equipment.

=== 21st century ===
Rosann Sidener, the school's principal from 2007 to 2013

Miami Beach Senior High School did not make AYP in 2006. Under the No Child Left Behind program, a school makes Adequate Yearly Progress (AYP) if it achieves the minimum levels of improvement determined by the state of Florida in terms of student performance and other accountability measures.

Since the 2006–2007 school year, the school has gone with a block schedule consisting of an A-Day (Odd - 1, 3, 5, 7) and B-Day (Even - 2, 4, 6, 8) on alternating school days. It consists of three classes before lunch under Secondary School Reform.

The 2007–2008 school year began with a new principal, Dr. Rosann Sidener, who improved the school's overall grade from a "D" to a "B" in her first year. This school year also saw the move from the old Beach High to the new Beach High in January 2008 with a new library and two new wings (2 and 3).

2008–2009 was the first year in which Miami Beach Sr. High students wore uniforms. In a two-to-one vote by some students' parents and guardians, the vote was ratified. Students now wear red or white shirts with the school logo or no logo, along with any shorts or jeans below the knees. The parents and faculty also voted to retain the Hi-Tide name and colors over going back to the Typhoons (former name).

Beginning with the 2009–2010 school year, Miami Beach Senior High is recognized as a magnet school, becoming the tenth magnet high school in Miami-Dade. Beach High was selected by the school district to apply for the MSAP grant, which is reserved for schools with high minority populations like Beach High, whose student body is 70% of Hispanic origin, compared to the state average of 25%. The district agreed to sponsor Miami Beach High because there are no other magnet schools in the area, and because of the expected increase of school size to nearly 3,000 students as a result of new construction. Beach High will now be able to receive students beyond its attendance boundaries along with those who live within them.

In early 2012, Principal Sidener was named the 2012 Principal of the Year by the Florida Association of School Administrators.

In May 2012, the school held its prom next to an XXXotica Porn Convention at the Miami Beach Convention Center. The two events were held side-by-side, separated by a wall. The prom was held at the convention center to avoid students' drinking at hotels. It was the subject of national jokes, especially on the Jimmy Kimmel Live! late-night show.

== Attendance zone ==
Areas of Miami Beach served by the school include Biscayne Point and Normandy Island. Additionally the school serves Bal Harbour, Bay Harbor Islands, Indian Creek, North Bay Village, and Surfside.

== Campus ==
=== Building 1 ===
Building 1 includes the main office, counselors' offices (second floor), and the foreign language wing (second floor).

=== Buildings 2 and 3 ===
Building 2 is made up of three floors and includes the library (first floor), 12 student restrooms (all floors), and a variety of different classrooms. Connected by an outdoor catwalk, Building 3 includes the Academy of Entrepreneurship (second floor), Academy of Visual and Performing Arts (first floor), and Academy of Information Technology (first and second floors) classrooms. Building 3 also includes the auditorium, as well as drama, chorus, band, guitar, and MIDI lab rooms.

=== Buildings 4 and 5 ===
Formerly the 9 Building, Building 4 includes the Academy of Hospitality and Tourism classroom, three science classrooms, and two student restrooms. Located across from Building 4 and formerly the 4 Building, Building 5 was remodeled as part of the ongoing construction of the new Miami Beach Senior High. Building 5 houses the NJROTC and Academy of Information Technology in its two floors. It has various classrooms and computer labs, including a remodeled weight training room.

=== Buildings 6 and 7 ===
Building 6 is a brand new wing that includes the physical ed classrooms, the SCSI room, and the gymnasium. Building 6 consists of two floors and also includes the Varsity and Junior Varsity locker rooms. Building 7 includes the Scholars' Academy wing. It has various classrooms throughout the two floors. Buildings 6 and 7 are located next to the cafeteria, which has six serving bays and a holding capacity of 1,100 people.

=== Football and soccer field ===
The football field is located behind Buildings 4 and 5 beside the back parking lot. It is currently not in use.

On May 28, 2010, it was announced that the Miami Dolphins and the National Football League had contributed towards the renovation of the field. A former alumnus, majority owner Stephen M. Ross, donated half of a $164,000 grant to the school. The field was expected to be renewed by that September, and named after Ross. His $82,000 grant matched an equal donation by the Dolphins, NFL Youth Football Fund and Local Initiatives Support Corporation.

The team plays its games at Flamingo Park's Memorial Field. It is expected to continue to play there, but could move to playing games at the school in the future.

== Athletics ==
Miami Beach Senior High School athletics logo

Miami Beach High School has a gymnasium which is used for basketball, volleyball and wrestling. The baseball and soccer field is in Flamingo Park, located about a mile away from the school. The current athletic director is Edgar Botto. Miami Beach High offers these athletics:

=== Fall schedule ===
- Boys' and girls' cross country
- Junior varsity football
- Varsity football
- Boys' and girls' bowling
- Boys' and girls' golf
- Boys' and girls' swimming & diving
- Girls' junior varsity volleyball
- Girls' varsity volleyball

=== Winter schedule ===
- Boys' varsity basketball
- Boys' junior varsity basketball
- Girls' junior varsity basketball
- Girls' varsity basketball
- Boys' varsity soccer
- Girls' junior varsity soccer
- Girls' varsity soccer
- Boys' varsity wrestling

=== Spring schedule ===
- Boys' varsity baseball
- Girls' junior varsity softball
- Girls' varsity softball
- Boys' varsity tennis
- Girls' varsity tennis
- Boys' varsity track
- Girls' varsity track
- Boys' varsity water polo
- Girls' varsity water polo

=== Year-round ===
- Boys' and girls' cheerleading team

=== Athletic achievements ===
Miami Beach Senior High cheerleaders with Miami Dolphins cheerleaders at ceremonial groundbreaking for the school's new football field

The school's sports history and achievements include:

- In the 1930s, the volleyball team won its first state championship. This was followed by district championships in 1990, 1998, 2002 and 2011.
- In 1946 and 1962, the basketball team won the state championship.
- In 1955, the football team was Gold Coast Champs.
- In 1965, Coach Chuck Fieldson was the Miami Herald's Coach of the Year.
- In the 1970s, the school won their first baseball championship, as well as two state runner-up finishes, all under future College Baseball Hall of Famer Skip Bertman. They also won the 2018 district championship.
- In 1974, the football team reached the state title game but lost to Leon High School, in Tallahassee.
- In 1995, the football team became district champions for the first time after 10 years in 1986.
- In 1985, 1986, 1989, 1996, and 2000, the school's wrestling team were district champions.
- in 1988 the school's boys water polo team won its first of three state championships.
- In 1990, 1993, 2011 and 2013, girls' cross country won district championships.
- In boys' soccer, Miami Beach Senior High has won the district titles in 1991, 1994, 1996, 1997, 1998, 1999, 2002, 2004, 2006, 2012, 2013, 2018, and 2023. GMAC Champions 1999 and 2023.
- Regional Champions in 1991, 1994, and 2018. They were state runner-up in 1994 and 2018.
- In the 2006–2007 football season, the varsity football team finished with a 0–10 record overall (0–5 District), the worst record in school history. The school has gone through its losing ways, with a 7–23 record since the start of the 2004 football season and has lost 15 of their 17 football games dating to 2005. The football team won its first game since 2005 when it beat rival Miami High 10–7, and won the following game after that, finishing the 2007 season with two wins and the 2008 season with four wins.
- In 2008, Junior Francisco "Hunter" Becerra won the state championship in the diving competition.
- In 2019, MBSH cheerleaders brought home their first 3 trophies. They won first place and most spirit at a FCDA competition and ended third place in the nationals.
- In 2011, the Miami Beach Hi-Tide football team began 4–0 for the first time in the new millennium, which included three shutouts to begin the season (Alonzo Mourning, North Miami, and Hialeah Gardens) and a 52–21 rout of rival Krop. The team has been led by Ricardo Louis, a top recruit in the county (ranked the No. 32 overall prospect in ESPNU Top 150 list and committed to Auburn).
- In 2011 the girls' varsity volleyball team made MBSH history by winning districts and advancing to regional semifinals. The team also achieved a 16–0 undefeated season before district competitions began.
- In 2011 and 2012 the girls' cross country team were district champs, advancing to regional semifinals.
- In the 2011–2012 and 2012–2013 academic school year the Miami Beach football team made two consecutive playoff appearances, a first in the school's history. Under head coach Jason Kradman the Hi-Tides got approval from the Miami Beach city hall for a $2.4 million renovation of Flamingo Park football field. The field was expected to be first used in September 2013.
- The school's athletic rival is Miami Senior High School but the school also has an informal athletic rivalry with Dr. Michael M. Krop Senior High School and North Miami Senior High School.
- Water polo is the most successful team in school history, with three state titles. Winning their first title in 1988.

=== Honor societies ===
- English Honor Society - open to juniors and seniors who have consistently maintained a high average in English for a minimum of three years
- Italian Honor Society - open to juniors and seniors who have consistently maintained a high average in their years spent studying the language
- Hispanic Honor Society - open to juniors and seniors who have consistently maintained a high average in Spanish for a minimum of three years
- Mu Alpha Theta - math honor society
- NRHS Honor Society is part of a national organization. Membership is based on scholarship, community service, leadership, and character. To qualify, students must show a minimum of 20 verifiable hours of community service, and display strong leadership qualities. Students meeting these requirements are interviewed and selected by members of the Faculty Council.
- Phi Beta Chi - science honor society, open to juniors and seniors who have consistently achieved 90s in science for a minimum of three years
- Quill and Scroll - writing honor society

== Academies ==
Academy of Hospitality and Tourism: Launched in 1987, this prepares students for post-secondary education and careers through a theme-based, contextualized curriculum approach. It provides students with the requisite knowledge and skills for a successful career in one of the world's largest service industries, through a curriculum that provides an in-depth look at all aspects of tourism and hospitality, including coursework in business, geography, hospitality, and economics. The Academy of Hospitality & Tourism operates as a small learning community and is located in more than 110 high schools nationwide, including Miami Beach Senior High. It is the largest academy of the school, with nearly 200 students. Students go on annual familiarization trips to places such as Denver, Alaska, Orlando, and San Francisco.

Academy of Information Technology: For students in the 9th through 12th grades, this academy provides student internships, job shadowing opportunities, industry certifications in networking (A+ and C.I.W.), Adobe Dreamweaver, Flash and Photoshop, and in Microsoft's M.O.S. AOIT students also network with NAF (The National Academy Foundation) and community leaders who help guide the program and advocate on its behalf. This academy teaches the students about computer technology in general.

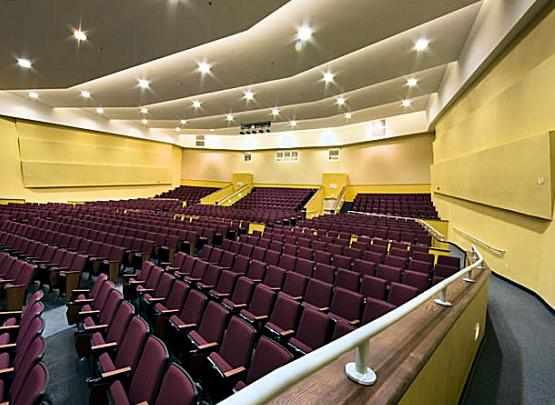
The Miami Beach Senior High school auditorium without any students during the summer. The Academy of Visual and Performing Arts stages many of its plays here.

Academy of Visual and Performing Arts: This offers program strands in drawing, painting, sculpture, photography, acting, music performance, music education, and music composition/sound engineering.

Academy of Digital Media: This offers program strands in film and television production, journalism and creative writing.

Academy of Marine and Environmental Science: This is offered to students interested in fields involving the environment or marine life.

Academy of Entrepreneurship: This is for students in grades 10–12 who wish to gain experience in business and entrepreneurship. AOSBE introduces high school students to the global workplace and to many career opportunities available in accounting, business administration, finance, and entrepreneurship.

Academy of Education and Child Care: This academy offers ways to learn about the responsibilities of child care to students. They use real-life situations as examples.

AVID: Advancement Via Individual Determination is a fourth- through twelfth-grade system to prepare students in the academic middle for four-year college eligibility. It has a proven track record in bringing out the best in students, and in closing the achievement gap.

Scholars Academy: During sophomore year, students in this academy are given the opportunity to apply for the International Baccalaureate program, which begins in the 11th grade and lasts until senior year.

== Academics ==
The State's Accountability program grades a school by a complex formula that looks at both current scores and annual improvement on the Reading, Math, Writing and Science FCATs.

Florida Comprehensive Assessment Test (school grades)
Year	Grade	Points	Percentage tested
1998-99	D	N/A	93%
1999-00	C	N/A	94%
2000-01	C	N/A	94%
2001-02	C	330	90%
2002-03	C	343	97%
2003-04	C	346	95%
2004-05	C	333	98%
2005-06	C	373	98%
2006-07	D	414	98%
2007-08	B	523	99%
2008-09	B	519	99%
2009-10	B	570	98%
2010-11	A	582	98%
2011-12	A	565	99%

== Films and productions shot at Beach High ==
An episode of MTV's MADE, a self-improvement reality television series, was shot at Miami Beach Senior High in early 2010, chronicling the Miami Beach Cheer Team. It is the third episode of the 11th season of the series. It premiered August 20, 2010, to mixed reviews.

In 1985, the opening scene of the movie Band of the Hand (directed by Paul Michael Glaser) was filmed at MBSH. An explosion scene was filmed by blowing out the wall to a classroom in the 100 wing.

== Student demographics ==
The ethnic composition of the student body is:

- 65% Hispanic
- 23% Non-Hispanic White
- 10% African American
- 2% Asian
- N/A multiracial
- N/A American Indian

The gender composition of the student body is:

- 51% male
- 49% female

By the 1950s the majority of Miami Beach High's student body had become Jewish. At that time many non-Jewish parents began sending their children to other schools. In previous decades wealthy Christian students were the majority.

== School renovations ==
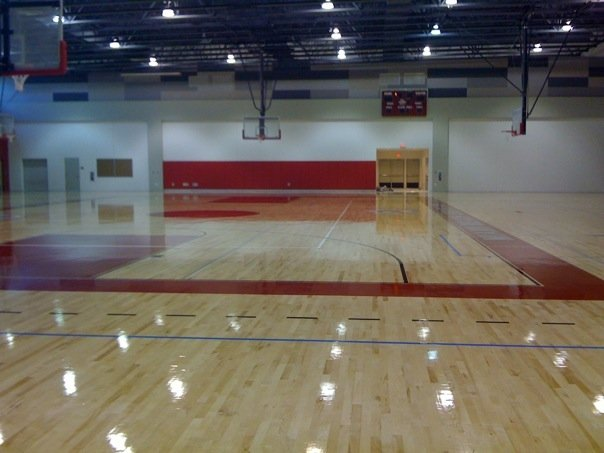
Miami Beach Senior High School's gymnasium

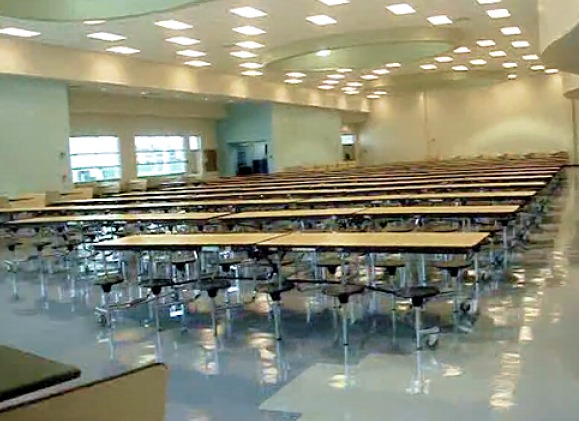
The school cafeteria

The school is undergoing major renovations after 47 years at its second and current location on Prairie Avenue. The school demolished three old buildings (100–300 wings) while remodeling the zero wing (now Building 7) for the Scholars' Academy. Taking their place were two new buildings (Buildings 2 and 3), which opened in early 2008 along with a remodeled CAP office, new auditorium, a new dining facility and outdoor dining area with food court style service, a new gymnasium, black box theater, media center, science and computer labs. The first phase, which includes the already completed bus lane and parking lots, parent drop-off lane, auditorium, and new classrooms, was completed in late 2007.

The completed construction and remodeling of the school was finished a few weeks before school started. This includes a fourth facility (Building 6) which houses a new gym and cafeteria and opened in time for the start of the 2009–10 school year over the former area of the 100–400 wings. The new air-conditioned gym is twice the size of the old gym, which was demolished during the summer break of 2009 in time for the first day of school. A courtyard replaced the old gym's location. The new gym has an aerobics room, dance studio, and new locker rooms.

== Notable alumni ==
Broadcast journalism
Alumni	Class	Occupation	Notable work
Barbara Walters	1947	Television news journalist and anchor	Hosted morning television shows Today and The View, and the television newsmagazine 20/20; co-anchor of the ABC Evening News and correspondent on ABC World News
Roy Firestone	1971	Sports commentator	Color commentator for ESPN's first season of ESPN Sunday Night Football in 1987
Film, theater and acting
Alumni	Class	Occupation	Notable work
Daniel Taradash	1929	Screenwriter	Won Academy Award
Kim Hunter	1940	Actress	Won Academy Award and Golden Globe Award as Best Supporting Actress for her performance as Stella Kowalski in A Streetcar Named Desire; received a Daytime Emmy Award for her work on The Edge of Night
Herb Rich	c. 1945	Football player	2x All-Pro NFL football player
Mark Medoff	1958	Playwright, screenwriter, film and theatre director, actor	Wrote Children of a Lesser God
Mitch Glazer	1969	Producer, writer, and actor	Associate producer of Lost in Translation and Magic City; director and writer of Passion Play
Mickey Rourke	1971	Actor, former boxer	Roles in The Wrestler (won Golden Globe for Best Actor), Diner, Sin City, Man on Fire, and Iron Man 2
Ellen Barkin (attended but did not graduate)	1972	Actress	Roles in Ocean's Thirteen and Brooklyn's Finest
Andy García	1974	Cuban American actor	Roles in The Godfather Part III, The Untouchables, Ocean's Eleven, Ocean's Twelve and Ocean's Thirteen
Debra Zane	1979	Casting director	Cast American Beauty, Ocean's Eleven, Ocean's Twelve, Ocean's Thirteen, Indiana Jones and the Kingdom of the Crystal Skull, The Twilight Saga: Breaking Dawn, The Hunger Games
Annabelle Gurwitch	1980	Actress	Roles in The Shaggy Dog and Boston Legal
Brett Ratner	1986	Filmmaker, music video director	Director of Rush Hour, Rush Hour 2, Rush Hour 3, and X-Men: The Last Stand
Jean McGianni Celestin	1997	Writer, filmmaker	Wrote The Birth of a Nation
Diora Baird	2001	Actress, former model	Roles in Wedding Crashers and The Texas Chainsaw Massacre: The Beginning
Nathalia Ramos (attended but did not graduate)	2010	Singer, actress	Roles in Bratz and House of Anubis
Sports
Alumni	Class	Occupation	Notable work
Ed Rubinoff	c. 1952	Former professional tennis player	
Skip Bertman	1956	Former Louisiana State University baseball coach	Member of the College Baseball Hall of Fame and led the LSU Tigers baseball team to College World Series Championships in 1991, 1993, 1996, 1997, and 2000
Ronald Green	1962	American-Israeli basketball player	
Mike Belkin	1963	Former Canadian tennis player	Canada's top-ranked player five times between 1966 and 1972, a career 17-12 Davis Cup record, including a 14–7 record in singles
Neal Walk	1965	NBA basketball player (retired)	Drafted 2nd overall in 1969 NBA draft
Eddie Dibbs	1969	Former professional tennis player	Attained a career high ranking of World No. 5 in July 1978
Billy Cesare	c. 1973	American football player	Played 5 seasons in the NFL
Norman Smiley	1983	Professional wrestler	Appeared in World Championship Wrestling
Elvis Yero	1984	Three-time Golden Gloves Amateur Boxing Champion, National AAU Champion	
Dave Thomas	1986	Former professional football player	Super Bowl XXVIII Champion (1993) with Dallas Cowboys
Duane Starks	1993	Former professional football player	Super Bowl XXXV Champion (2001) with Baltimore Ravens
Terry Cousin	1993	Former football cornerback	Played for hometown Miami Dolphins in 2001
Samari Rolle	1994	Professional football player (defensive back)	Played for the Baltimore Ravens, one-time Pro Bowl selection
Chad Johnson	1996	Professional football player (wide receiver)	Super Bowl XLVI appearance (2012) with the New England Patriots, six-time Pro Bowler, appeared on Dancing with the Stars
Ricardo Louis	2012	Professional football player (wide receiver)	Caught the “Prayer at Jordan-Hare”
Music and entertainment
Alumni	Class	Occupation	Notable work
Ruth W. Greenfield	1941	Musician and teacher	Founder of Miami Fine Arts Conservatory
David Lucas (born David Helfman)	1955	Composer and producer	Wrote many well-known commercial jingles such as AT&T's "Reach out and touch someone"; early producer for Blue Öyster Cult, sang backup vocals and came up with the idea for the cowbell in "Don't Fear the Reaper"
Desmond Child	1972	Musician	Member of Songwriters Hall of Fame
Michael Gordon	1973	Composer	Co-founder of the Bang on a Can festival and ensemble
David Chesky	1973	Composer, Record label owner	Grammy Award-nominated composer, Co-founder of Chesky Records, Co-Founder of HDtracks
Norman Chesky	1973	Record label owner and producer	Co-founder of Chesky Records, Co-Founder of HDtracks, Producer of over 300 albums
Luther Campbell	1979	Record label owner and rap performer	One-time member and leader of 2 Live Crew
Ann Curless	1982	Musician	Member of group Exposé
Alex Omes	198?/199?	Electronic music and concert promoter	Co-founder of Ultra Music Festival
Tego Calderón	1990	Puerto Rican rap artist	Broke records of attendance of audience at a concert in El Salvador, Guatemala, Ecuador, Dominican Republic, Puerto Rico and Mexico; appeared in Fast & Furious and Fast Five
Fernando Perdomo	1998	Producer, singer-songwriter, guitarist, record label owner	Produced Linda Perhacs, Andy Pratt, and Dean Ford; recorded and toured with Mika, Todd Rundgren, Christian Castro and Paulina Rubio
Chris Price	2002	Singer-songwriter and record producer	Producer for 1970s cult figures Linda Perhacs and Emitt Rhodes; recorded a solo album entirely on an IPhone 4
Business
Alumni	Class	Occupation	Notable work
Robert Rubin	1956	Banker	Former co-CEO of Goldman Sachs and United States Secretary of the Treasury under President Bill Clinton
Stephen M. Ross	1958	New York City-based real estate developer, founder of The Related Companies	95% owner of the NFL Miami Dolphins and 95% owner of Hard Rock Stadium
Nevin Shapiro	1986	Former University of Miami booster	Convicted in a $960 million Ponzi scheme; central figure in the 2011 University of Miami athletics scandal, when he revealed that he had provided about $2 million in benefits to Miami athletes, mostly football players, in violation of NCAA rules
Bonnie Lyons	1952	Writer and professor	Professor at University of Texas at San Antonio
Thane Rosenbaum	1978	American novelist, essayist and law professor	Distinguished Fellow at the New York University School of Law
Daniel Schechter	1979	Author and researcher	Professor of Psychiatry at the University of Geneva, Switzerland
Science and technology
Alumni	Class	Occupation	Notable work
Jonathan Sackner-Bernstein	1979	Physician, researcher	Cardiologist; formerly FDA's Associate Center Director for Technology and Innovation (Center for Devices) and consultant to DARPA (Biological Technologies Office).
Politics and justice
Alumni	Class	Occupation	Notable work
Gerald Kogan	1958	Former Chief Justice	Served as Chief Justice for the Florida Supreme Court (1987–98)
Steven J. Green	1963	Former United States Ambassador to Singapore	Honorary Consul General of the Republic of Singapore
Dan Gelber	1978	Attorney	38th Mayor of Miami Beach; Member of Florida Senate (35th District); 2010 Democratic candidate for Florida Attorney General
Alan S. Gold	1980	Politician	Florida State Representative

== See also ==
- Miami-Dade County Public Schools
