= Chesky =

Chesky may refer to:

== People ==
- Brian Chesky (born 1981), American businessman, co-founder of Airbnb
- David Chesky (born 1956), American musician and record label owner
- Norman Chesky, American music producer and record label owner
- Evelyn Chesky (born 1933), American politician
- Larry Chesky (1933–2011), Polka band leader and manager of the record label Rex Records

== Other ==
- Chesky Records, an American record label company
