= Chris Jones (American musician) =

American songwriter (1958–2005)

- Born: Christopher Paul Jones; November 11, 1958; Reno, Nevada, U.S.
- Died: September 13, 2005 (aged 46) Northeim, Germany
- Genres: Blues; classical; country; folk; rock and roll
- Occupation: Musician
- Instruments: Guitar, vocals
- Years active: 1970s–2005
- Label: Stockfisch
- Formerly of: Sara K.; Allan Taylor; Reinhard Mey

Chris Jones (November 11, 1958 – September 13, 2005) was an American singer and guitarist who worked mainly in Europe, having moved to Germany after he joined the United States Army. He often recorded with the German audiophile label Stockfisch Records.

== Biography ==
Christopher Paul Jones was born in Reno, Nevada. At the age of five, he began playing the guitar. A few years later, he decided to become a professional musician, and when he was 11 years old, he was admitted to a program at the Peabody Conservatory of Music in Baltimore, Maryland. There he discovered Johann Sebastian Bach, to whom he dedicated his student composition "Sonata in D", and for which Jones was awarded the conservatory's "Young Composer of the Year" award.

Shortly thereafter, he discovered the blues and started listening to Robert Johnson, James Taylor, and Little Feat.

In 1976, Jones joined the U.S. Army and was stationed in Adenine's, Germany. During this time, the foundation for his musical career in Europe was laid. Over the following decades, he played guitar on albums of artists such as Sara K., Allan Taylor, and Reinhard Mey. He toured and recorded solo and with the blues harmonica musician Steve Baker.

In August 2005, Jones was diagnosed with Hodgkin's lymphoma in an advanced stage. He died on September 13, 2005, in Northeim, Germany. Many friends and other musicians helped him, either personally or by staging charity concerts to help with his expenses.

== Music ==
Jones' repertoire encompassed various musical styles, among them blues, country, folk, and rock and roll, much of which was published on Stockfisch Records label.

== Selected discography ==
=== Solo ===
- 1983 No Looking Back
- 1995 The Dreaming Pool
- 1998 Free Man - StrictlyCountryRecords.com
- 2000 Moonstruck
- 2003 Roadhouses and Automobiles

=== with Steve Baker ===
- 1995 Slow Roll
- 1996 Everybody's Crying Mercy
- 2003 Smoke and Noise
- 2005 Gotta Look Up

=== with Kieran Halpin ===
- 1995 Glory Dayz
- 2002 Moving Air
- 2002 Back Smiling Again
- 2004 The Roundtower Sessions
- 2005 A Box of Words and Tunes
- 2024 Live in Holland - Part I - StrictlyCountryRecords.com
- 2024 Live in Holland - Part II - StrictlyCountryRecords.com

=== with Liz Meyer ===
- 2019 Blue Lonesome Wind - StrictlyCountryRecords.com

=== with Reinhard Mey ===
- 2002 Rüm Hart
- 2004 Nanga Parbat

=== with Sara K. ===
- 2002 Waterfalls
- 2002 Live in Concert: Are We There Yet?
- 2006 Hell or High Water

=== with Steve Strauss ===
- 2005 Just Like Love

=== Early works (with various musicians) ===
- 1979 Friends and Charlie
- 1980 Night Shift
- 1980 Getting Your Own Back
- 1993 Mr. Bluesman (soundtrack)

== See also ==
- Sara K.
- Stockfisch Records
