= Stockfisch Records =

German independent record label

- Founded: 1974
- Founder: Günter Pauler
- Genre: Jazz, blues, folk
- Country of origin: Germany
- Location: Northeim
- Official website: stockfisch-records.de

Stockfisch Records is a German independent record label, aimed at audiophile fans of guitar-oriented singer-songwriter music and was formed in 1974 by Günter Pauler. Based in Germany, the main focus is European artists, but there are also American musicians working with Stockfisch, some of them expatriates living in Germany.

Stockfisch releases vinyl editions of albums and Direct Stream Digital-recordings released as hybrid Super Audio CDs.

== History ==
The two artists with which Stockfisch Records started out in 1974 were Werner Lämmerhirt and David Qualey. They as guitar-playing singer-songwriters set the tone for many of their kind to come. Over the years, however, other instrumentalists apart from guitarists signed to Stockfisch.

In 2001, Pauler managed to get the "Queen of Audiophile" Sara K. to sign to Stockfisch Records after her contract with Chesky Records had expired. Sara K. mentions that she was convinced to sign after Pauler had gotten Chris Jones as accompaniment and sent her a fair but unheard of one-page record contract. The live album Live in Concert (2003) which resulted from her 2002 Bowers & Wilkins–sponsored "Nautilus" tour was chosen as the best audiophile CD of 2003 by the readers of the German magazine AUDIO/stereoplay and received their "Hifi Music Award 2003".

== Roster ==
- Duo Balance
- Peter Finger
- Haugaard & Høirup
- Hein & Oss
- Chris Jones
- Sara K.
- Werner Lämmerhirt
- Brooke Miller
- David Munyon
- David Qualey
- Peter Ratzenbeck
- David Roth
- Mike Silver
- Song Zuying
- The Spirit of Gambo
- Paul Stephenson
- Steve Strauss
- Allan Taylor
- The Billy Tipton Memorial Saxophone Quartet/The Tiptons
- Péter Tóth
- Christian Willisohn
