= Carla Lother =

- Born: May 6, 1963; Winnipeg, Manitoba, Canada
- Genres: Classical music; Folk pop; Indie pop; New age; Traditional pop
- Occupation(s): Musician, singer, songwriter
- Instrument(s): Piano, flute, vocals
- Labels: Chesky

Carla Lother is a singer, songwriter, pianist, and flautist from Winnipeg, Manitoba, Canada.

Lother was born into a musical family. Her mother was a classical pianist, and her father was a cabaret and jazz singer. In her early years she studied classical piano, and won her first competition at the age of six. Much of her formative years were spent travelling and participating in various festivals and workshops. She also sang in choirs, which Lother later credited as an influence in her style of writing harmony. At 15, her brother invited her to join his rock band, and she was exposed to the likes of Todd Rundgren, The Police, and Led Zeppelin. In 1978 she took home first prize at the Concours de Musique du Canada and the Canadian Outstanding Artist Award in 1987.

Lother studied at University of Manitoba and the Banff School of Fine Arts at the University of Alberta. She eventually hitchhiked to New York City to attend the Mannes College of Music on a scholarship. Going to school in the United States also provided her with a visa. She received a Masters in piano performance and a professional studies diploma in voice, while working cleaning bathrooms and answering phones at the school. After graduation, she continued to work at Mannes as Director of Continuing Education.

Lother borrowed $2,000 from a friend for studio time and a producer in order to record her first album. She was introduced to David Chesky who in turn introduced her to producer Joel Goodman. From there, she signed to Chesky Records and her first album, Ephemera, was released in 1999. A second album, 100 Lovers, followed in 2004. Four songs from this album are collaborations between Lother and guitarist Richie Stotts of the Plasmatics.

Apart from her studio albums, Lother does session work, has recorded for CRI Recordings, and performed vocals on a Bang on a Can release. She sang in advertising for Dove Soap, MasterCard, Kit Kat, Kitchen Aid, and Maxwell House. She directed musical theater for ASPIRA's Project Enhance which teams professional musicians with at risk students. Lother also maintains a private studio of piano students.

== Discography ==
- Ephemera (Chesky, 1999)
- Cool Sounds, Modern Voices (Chesky, 1999) (compilation)
- 100 Lovers (Chesky, 2004)
