= Roll On River =

Studio album by Werner Lämmerhirt and Wizz Jones
- Released: 1981
- Genre: Folk, folk rock, country blues
- Label: FolkFreak
- Producer: Unknown

Roll On River is the 1981 album by the German Werner Lämmerhirt and British Wizz Jones, both of them noted solo folk guitarists, singers and songwriters. Jones had first met Lämmerhirt at the Steve Club in Berlin in the early-1970s. Carsten Linde, who produced Lazy Farmer's 1975 album featuring Wizz Jones, suggested a collaboration, which resulted in this recording.

The title track is a Bill Boazman song.

== Record details ==
FolkFreak FF 4006 (Germany, 1981)
Vinyl LP

== Track listing ==
1. "One By One" (Werner Lämmerhirt)
2. "Beware Of Charming Friends" (Wizz Jones)
3. "About A Spoonful" (Mance Lipscombe)
4. "He Was A Friend Of Mine" (Werner Lämmerhirt)
5. "Harry and Angel" (Wizz Jones)
6. "Poacher's Moon" (Wizz Jones)
7. "Autumn Leaves Are Bound To Fall" (Werner Lämmerhirt)
8. "Hey Unborn Baby" (Werner Lämmerhirt)
9. "When Shadows Fall" (Snooks Eaglin)
10. "Roll On River" (Bill Boazman)
