= Christy Baron =

American jazz and pop singer and actress

- Genres: Jazz, pop
- Occupations: Actress, singer
- Years active: 1980s–present
- Label: Chesky
- Website: www.christybaron.com

Christy Baron is an American jazz and pop singer, and actress.

== Early life and education ==
A native of Munhall, Pennsylvania, Baron is a graduate of the drama department at Carnegie Mellon University. While a student there, she performed at jazz clubs in the Pittsburgh area.

== Career ==
On Broadway, she portrayed Fantine in Les Miserables for six years. During her career, she has worked with David Sanborn, Natalie Cole, Carly Simon, and Dr. John.

Her acting career includes acting at the Williamstown Theatre Festival and in the feature film Pants on Fire (2000).

In 1997, a standing-room-only crowd attended Birdland jazz club when Baron and her band opened there. She has performed with the Pittsburgh Symphony Orchestra,. and for a year she was a featured performer in the musical revue Mad Hattan in the New York New York Casino in Las Vegas, Nevada.

Christopher Loudon, reviewing Baron's album Take This Journey for JazzTimes, wrote that her singing on the album has "an unfiltered honesty that’s as refreshing as an early morning snowfall and fulfilling as a heartfelt compliment."

== Discography ==
- I Thought About You (1997)
- Steppin' (2000)
- Take This Journey (2002)
