= Beat Kaestli =

- Born: Switzerland
- Genres: Jazz, indie, nu-jazz
- Occupation: Singer
- Years active: 1993–present
- Labels: Chesky, B+B
- Website: www.beatkaestli.com

Beat Kaestli (Note: first name is pronounced bay-at) is a Swiss singer, songwriter, arranger, and producer.

== Music career ==
After receiving a scholarship to the Manhattan School of Music in 1993, he moved from his native Switzerland to New York City. He supported himself as a session singer, backing Barbara Tucker and Inaya Day, and working with Linda Hopkins on the world tour of the Harlem Gospel Show. His debut album was Reasons (2002), a collection of R&B-infused, pop-jazz originals that led to comparisons to such disparate headliners as George Michael and Maxwell.

He has worked with Jane Monheit, Stefon Harris, and Jason Moran and has appeared at Birdland, The Jazz Standard, B.B. King's, 55 Bar, and The Blue Note. In 2005, Beat was the chosen vocalist for the Glenn Miller Orchestra.

In 2006, Beat's second album Happy, Sad, and Satisfied was released. Happy, Sad, and Satisfied garnered positive reviews and was named one of the top 25 CDs of 2006 by Indie Music magazine.

Kaestli returned to the classroom in 2007 when the Ella Fitzgerald Foundation scholarship from the Society of Singers provided him the opportunity to earn a master's degree from the Aaron Copland School of Music.

On 2009's multilingual Far from Home, Kaestli paid tribute to European songwriters such as Michel Legrand and Kurt Weill and included original collaborations with contemporary European composers, like Misha Piatigorsky and Tino Derado. Far from Home also garnered many positive reviews, prompting Jon Hendricks to praise Kaestli as "soulful [and] sensitive."

In 2010, Kaestli moved to the jazz label Chesky Records for his album, Invitation. The album was his return to the Great American Songbook. Supported by bassist Jay Leonhart, drummer Billy Drummond, saxophonist Joel Frahm, trumpeter Kenny Rampton, and guitarist Paul Meyers.

Invitation is Kaestli's best received album so far. Invitation was recorded at historic St. Peter's Church in Chelsea, Manhattan. Instead of close miking all the instruments, Chesky used one microphone to hear the 360-degree acoustic space of St. Peter's Church. This album has been praised for its sound quality by JazzTimes.

== Discography ==
- 2002 Reasons
- 2005 Happy, Sad, and Satisfied
- 2009 Far from Home
- 2010 Invitation (Chesky)
