= Portraits of Cuba =

Studio album by Paquito D'Rivera
- Released: 1996
- Length: 60:44
- Label: Chesky Records
- Producer: David Chesky

Professional ratings
Review scores
| Source | Rating |
|---|---|
| The Penguin Guide to Jazz Recordings | 3/4 stars |

Portraits of Cuba is an album by Cuban musician Paquito D'Rivera, released through Chesky Records in 1996. In 1997, the album won D'Rivera the Grammy Award for Best Latin Jazz performance.

== Track listing ==
1. "La Bella Cubana" (White) – 5:14
2. "The Peanut Vendor" (L. Wolfe Gilbert, Moisés Simons, Marion Sunshine) – 4:38
3. "Tú" (DeFuentes, Fuentes) – 5:35
4. "Tú, Mi Delirio" (De La Luz) – 6:31
5. "No Te Importe Saber" (Touzet) – 5:42
6. "Drume Negrita" (Grenet, Grenet) – 4:18
7. "Portraits of Cuba" (D'Rivera) – 5:04
8. "Excerpt from 'Aires Tropicales'" (D'Rivera) – 0:48
9. "Mariana" (Franzetti) – 5:30
10. "Como Arrullo de Palmas" (Lecuona) – 3:22
11. "Échale Salsita" (Pineiro) – 5:06
12. "Song to My Son" (D'Rivera) – 5:22
13. "Theme from 'I Love Lucy'" (Harold Adamson, Daniel, Daniel) – 3:25
