= Dave's True Story =

American musical performance group

- Origin: New York City
- Genres: Vocal jazz, adult contemporary, lounge
- Years active: 1994–2007
- Labels: Bepop, Chesky
- Past members: Kelly Flint; David Cantor; Jeff Eyrich
- Website: www.davestruestory.com

Dave's True Story was an American jazz-pop group consisting of Kelly Flint on vocals, David Cantor on guitar, and Jeff Eyrich on bass. They were known for Cantor's witty, risqué lyrics contrasted with Flint's warm, delicate voice.

Cantor, from Queens, and Flint, from Indiana, met in the early 1990s in Greenwich Village. Cantor drew inspiration from Donald Fagen for cynical lyrics and jazz chord changes, while Flint was a fan of Joni Mitchell. Bassist Jeff Eyrich joined the group and became their manager.

After their debut album in 1994, they signed with audiophile label Chesky Records and released Sex Without Bodies. Dave's True Story received favorable press and a loyal following in New York City night clubs. They won the Kerrville Music Award and appeared on Christmas compilations for Hear Music and Pottery Barn. They also won an award for the song "Everlasting No" at the Independent Music Awards.

In 2001 two Dave's True Story songs, "Crazy Eyes" and "Sequined Mermaid Dress", appeared in the movie Kissing Jessica Stein. Their songs also appeared on the TV shows Satisfaction and Breaking Bad. Flint made a solo album, Drive All Night, in a folk music style. Dave's True Story broke up in 2007.

== Discography ==
- Dave's True Story (BePop, 1994)
- Sex Without Bodies (Chesky, 1998)
- Unauthorized (Chesky, 2000)
- Nature (BePop, 2005)
- Project Remix (BePop, 2005)
- Simple Twist of Fate (BePop, 2005)
- A Dave's True Story Christmas: The Complete Collection (BePop, 2007)
