= Sara K. =

American singer-songwriter

Sara K
- Sara K. in Solingen, Germany, November 18, 2007

Background information
- Born: Sara Katherine Wooldridge; May 16, 1956; Dallas, Texas, U.S.
- Genres: Folk, blues, jazz
- Occupations: Musician, singer, songwriter
- Instrument: Guitar
- Years active: 1970s–2009
- Labels: Mesa/Blue Moon, Chesky, Stockfisch
- Website: www.sarak.com

Sara Katherine Wooldridge, known professionally as Sara K., is an American singer-songwriter and acoustic guitarist. She withdrew from the music business in 2009.

== Early life ==
Born and raised in Dallas, Texas, she grew up in a family surrounded by music: her mother sang in a church choir, her father in a barbershop quartet, her brother played in a band, and her sister played guitar. However, her family considered music a hobby, not a job.

In 1965, at the age of 9, she started playing the guitar, using a flamenco guitar that her sister had left behind. She removed the remaining strings and added four bass strings, (tuned to an open A). This gave it a fuller tone than a conventional acoustic guitar while not sounding as deep as a bass. This tuning became one of her trademarks.

== Career ==
=== Career beginnings ===
After graduating and moving out, she spent a few years taking work wherever she could find it, singing back-up vocals, jingles, and making demo tapes. When she felt out of place in Dallas, she moved to Ruidoso, New Mexico. She led the band Sara K. and the Boys Without Sleep. From 1978 to 1983, she toured mainly New Mexico and Los Angeles. She also toured with country musician Gary Nunn for two years.

She released her debut album, Gypsy Alley, in 1989. Many of the songs were influenced by years of a nomadic life. These years ended when she rented a place on Gypsy Alley (off Canyon Road in Santa Fe), won a goldfish at a country fair, and got her dog, Bebe, who is mentioned many times in her songs. She won a best album award from the New Mexico Music Industry Coalition.

=== Chesky years ===
One of the musicians she worked with on Gypsy Alley was guitarist Bruce Dunlap, who was signed to Chesky Records, a record label in New York City aimed mainly at audiophiles. Dunlap brought her to the label and she signed for more than ten years until 2001. The change was marked by contrasts: between her home in Santa Fe and Chesky's home in New York City, between her analog acoustic music and the high-tech equipment at Chesky, and between her dream of fame and wealth and the reality of the record industry. She recorded six albums for Chesky.

She toured Europe and planned to move to San Francisco but remained where she was. At the end of her contract with Chesky, she felt she had "been ripped off in many directions by labels and touring companies".

=== Stockfisch years ===
On her last tour through Germany under the Chesky contract, the owner of the German label Stockfisch Records, Günter Pauler, was called to be her sound specialist. He gave her a tour of his studio and offered her a contract and the prospect of having guitarist Chris Jones as a guest musician. Her first Stockfisch album, Water Falls (2001), was followed by a tour, which provided material for a live DVD and the album Live in Concert (2003). She won the Hi-Fi Music Award in 2003 from the German magazine Audio/Steoreoplay.

Her album Hell or High Water (2006) again featured Chris Jones on guitar and dobro. Jones died of Hodgkin's lymphoma shortly after recording, before the album was released. Her fourth album for Stockfisch, Made in the Shade, came out in 2009, with new versions of songs from her debut album. After the release of this album, she announced that she was going to quit the music business. In a note to her fans on her label's website, she stated, "After many years on the road and writing music, I've decided to stop touring and recording. It's hard to explain why but I hope you will understand. I had a good run but I think it's over. It's just too much for too little these days. Made in the Shade explains it as best as I know how."

In 2015, Stockfisch published a live album called Horse I Used to Ride based on the recording of a solo concert in Sülbeck, Germany, on April 6, 2001. Out of habit, Günter Pauler, head of Stockfisch, had brought his mobile recording equipment to this concert. He asked Sara K. if he could record the concert, and she agreed. After that concert, Chris Jones added dobro guitar solos to these tracks in the studio. When Pauler sent the recordings to Sara K., she was thrilled.

== Awards and honors ==
- Best Album Award, Gypsy Alley, New Mexico Music Industry Coalition, 1989
- AUDIO "Goldenes Audio-Ohr" (Golden Audio Ear) award 1994 for the album Play On Words
- Bundesverband der Phonographischen Wirtschaft (Phonographic Business Association of Germany) Jazz Award 1996, 1998, and 2002 for the albums Tell Me I'm Not Dreamin' , Hobo, and Water Falls
- AUDIO/stereoplay "Hifi Music Award" 2003 for Best Audiophile Album for Live in Concert
- "Just Plain Folks 2004 Music Award" for Best Blues Song, Turned My Upside Down (live version with Chris Jones)

== Discography ==
- Gypsy Alley (Mesa/Bluemoon, 1989)
- Closer Than They Appear (Chesky, 1992)
- Play on Words (Chesky, 1994)
- Tell Me I'm Not Dreamin (Chesky, 1995)
- Hobo (Chesky, 1997)
- No Cover (Chesky, 1999) (CD & DVD)
- What Matters (Chesky, 2001)
- Water Falls (Stockfisch, 2002)
- Nautilus Tour (Stockfisch/in-akustik, 2003) (DVD)
- The Chesky Collection (Chesky, 2003)
- Live in Concert (Stockfisch, 2003)
- Hell or High Water (Stockfisch, 2006)
- Made in the Shade (Stockfisch, 2009)
- Horse I Used to Ride (Stockfisch, 2015)

== See also ==
- Chris Jones
- Chesky Records
- Stockfisch Records
