= Ana Caram =

Brazilian singer and musician

- Born: Ana Lucia Ribeiro Caram; October 1, 1958 (age 67); São Paulo, Brazil
- Genres: Jazz, bossa nova
- Occupations: Musician, singer
- Instruments: Guitar, flute
- Years active: 1980s–present
- Label: Chesky
- Website: anacaram.com.br

Ana Lucia Ribeiro Caram (born 1 October 1958) is a Brazilian singer, guitarist, and flautist who sings jazz, samba, and bossa nova music. Caram was born in São Paulo to a family versed in musical expression. She graduated from São Paulo University with a degree in musical composition and conducting. In Rio she became a protégé of Antonio Carlos Jobim, the primary developer of the bossa nova style. Caram's own style is a blend of bossa nova and jazz. She performed with Paquito D'Rivera at Carnegie Hall for the 1989 JVC Jazz Festival.

== Discography ==
- Ana Caram (Fama, 1987)
- Rio After Dark (Chesky, 1989)
- Amazonia (Chesky, 1990)
- JVC Jazz Festival Live: A Night of Chesky Jazz, Town Hall, New York with Paquito D'Rivera, Tom Harrell, Fred Hersch, Phil Woods (Chesky, 1992)
- The Other Side of Jobim (Chesky, 1992)
- Maracana (Chesky, 1993)
- Bossa Nova (Chesky, 1995)
- Sunflower Time (Mercury, 1996)
- Blue Bossa (Chesky, 2001)
- Hollywood Rio (Chesky, 2004)
- Pensava em Você (2018)
- Pura Luz (2018)
