= The Filth (album) =

Studio album by Sonny Black's Blues Band
- Released: circa 1987
- Recorded: 1983–1987
- Genre: Blues
- Label: Private pressing
- Producer: Terry Dobney

Sonny Black's Blues Band chronology
The Filth	Smile on the Blues

The Filth is the first album by the noted British blues band, Sonny Black's Blues Band, fronted by songwriter, guitarist and singer Bill Boazman. It was recorded over the period of 1983 to 1987 and released by Boazman as a private pressing, sold at gigs. Boazman was formerly a solo artist and had performed with Heron.

== Track listing ==
=== Side 1 ===
1. "Blues Is Here To Stay"
2. "Don't Touch Me"
3. "Jookin'" (recorded live at Dingwalls, Camden Lock, summer 1987)
4. "Last Night"
5. "Talk To Me, Baby"
6. "Function" (not listed on sleeve - recorded live at the Boar's Head, Wickham, summer 1987)

=== Side 2 ===
1. "The Filth"
2. "After All These Years"
3. "Sidetracked"
4. "The Thrill Is Gone"
5. "Bring It On Home"
6. "Woodcray Rag"

== Personnel ==
- Bill Boazman - vocals, lead and slide guitar
- Dave Bispham - drums
- Dick Jones - bass
- Paul Swinton - vocal, harmonica, guitar
- Maggie Jarvis - organ
- Ian Smith - bass
- Frank Sidebottom - piano

== Production ==
- Production: Terry Dobney
- Editing: Simon Mayor
- Mastering: "The Producers", Camden Town

=== Studio tracks ===
- Sound engineer: Nick Horne at Woodcray Studios, Wokingham, 1983 to 1986
- Mixing: "Deaf Boy" Fuller

=== Live tracks ===
- Recording: Andy Hyland
- Mixing: Andy Hyland
