= Elvis Yero =

Cuban boxer

Elvis Yero (January 26, 1965 in Havana, Cuba – October 13, 2001 in Miami, Florida) was a boxer in the Welterweight division. He grew up in the North Beach section of Miami Beach, Florida, where he graduated from Miami Beach Senior High School in 1984.

== Career ==
=== Amateur career ===
At the age of 15, Yero decided on an amateur boxing career. At the 1981 Florida Golden Gloves, Yero stopped Greg Collins of Miami at 1:02 of the second round in the High School Division-139 lbs. At the 1982 South Florida Golden Gloves Regional Tournament, Yero TKO'd Lavaniel Hicks from Moore Park at 1:30 of the first round. He won the 132 lbs. Division in the South Florida Golden Gloves, and the 139 lbs. Division in the South Florida Golden Gloves. According to an August 21, 1979 report in the Miami Herald, he defeated Tommy Williams in the main event of the amateur boxing card at the Verrick Gym in Coconut Grove, Florida. On October 20, 1979, Yero was knocked out by Hugo Rodriguez at 1:58 of the 3rd round on an amateur card at the Verrick.

In 1984, Yero won the National AAU Amateur Lightwelterweight Title at 139 lbs. On February 14, 1984, Yero decision Tommy Williams in the main event at the Verrick. Two days later, Yero stopped Ron Beasley in 2 rounds in an amateur fight. On March 16, 1984, Yero decisioned Joseph Walkers in North Miami Beach in an amateur fight. The Miami Herald listed Yero's record as 29-1 (17 knockouts).

On March 22, 1984, Yero lost a decision to Clifford Gray at the Southern Regional Florida State Sunshine State Golden Gloves Boxing Tournament at the Victory Park Gym in North Miami Beach. On October 4, 1984, The Miami Herald reported that Ivan Gonzalez TKO'd Yero at 1:30 of the 1st round in the main event at the Verrick Gym. On August 2, 1985, Yero decisioned Derrick Rolan at the National Sport's Festival in Baton Rouge. The Next night, Yero won again. At the National Sport's Festival on August 5, 1985. Yero lost a 3-2 decision to Nick Kakouris in the 139 lbs. Division Championship match.

=== Professional career ===
In 1986 Yero turned professional in Florida. Undefeated in his first 10 fights, Yero quickly caught the eye of boxing fans and experts, but then he lost a decision to Lee Smith in 1991. After a five fight win streak, he again lost, to journeyman Kenny Ellis. This was Yero's last fight.

== Legal troubles ==
Yero's troubles with the law began at an early age. He and a friend, Mario Villar, Jr., were arrested by Miami Beach Police for assaulting lawyer Mark Diestag on December 4, 1982 in a Miami Beach park after midnight. Diestag, the husband of Judge Gisela Cardonne-Dienstag, was out walking his dog when he got into a confrontation with Yero, who was 17–0 in amateur boxing at the time, and his friend Villar. Diegtag was brutally beaten and also had numerous bite marks on his body. Yero and Villar were held in jail for 4-months, but on August 16, 1983, both were found not guilty and were released from jail. The court ruled that Yero and Villar acted in self-defense. Villar was later killed in a motorcycle crash in North Miami Beach, Florida.

According to the Miami-Dade County Clerk Criminal Justice and Civil Infraction Case records He was arrested 52 times, between December 8, 1982 and September 19, 2001. He was charged with grand theft auto, armed robbery, burglary, possession of marijuana and cocaine, domestic violence, drinking in public, dealing in stolen property, lewd and lascivious behavior, panhandling, disorderly conduct, cocaine sale, trespassing, battery, grand theft, panhandling, and loitering.

On April 23, 1989, the Miami Herald reported that Yero was arrested for robbing the NCNB Bank at 2391 Collins Avenue on Miami Beach for $2.22. On July 5, 1990, the Miami Herald reported that Yero was shot in the hand, and arrested, during a drug-sting, when he punched and kicked undercover Miami Beach Police Officer Sunday Sanchez.

== Death ==
Yero died of a drug overdose at age 36. He was found dead in a Miami motel room on Saturday, October 13, 2001, survived by his mother and brother. He is buried at Dade Memorial Park.
