= Sonny Black =

British musician

Sonny Black (Bill Boazman)
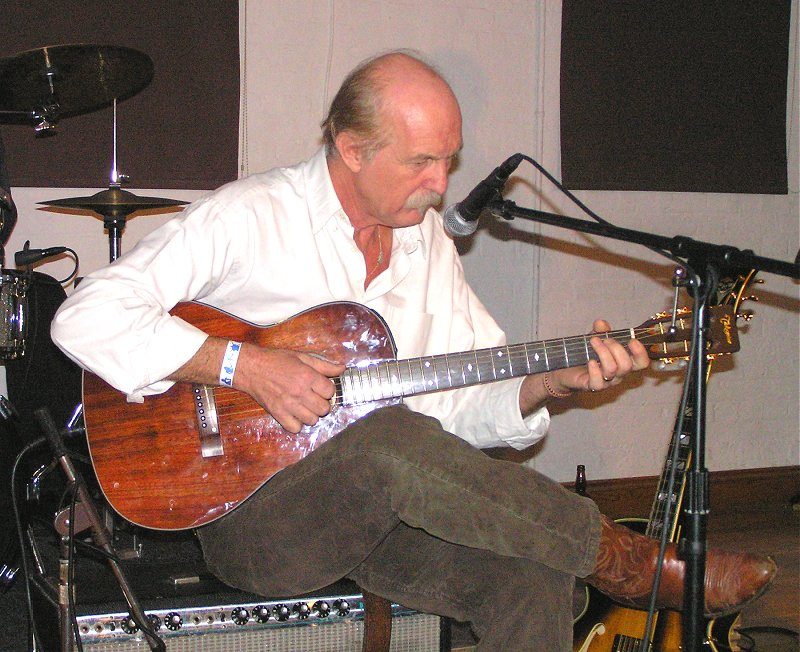

Background information
- Also known as: Sonny Black
- Born: William Boazman
- Origin: England
- Genres: Blues, folk
- Occupations: Guitarist, singer, songwriter
- Years active: 1960s–present
- Labels: Various, see Discography
- Website: sonnyblack.co.uk

William Boazman, known as Sonny Black, is an acoustic guitarist based in the UK, who plays blues, rags and original compositions usually fingerstyle or slide. "Sonny Black" is a pseudonym adopted when he began the first Sonny Black's Blues Band. He previously became well known as Bill Boazman on the folk club circuit and at college gigs during the 1970s as a singer, songwriter and acoustic guitarist. He has been credited with accompanying J. J. Cale, but this is a fallacy arising from a typographic error involving an American musician with a similar name, Bob Brozman.

== Biography ==
=== First influences ===
Bill Boazman's father, also named William, was an officer in the REME regiment of the British Army. William senior took an active part in army entertainment and on retirement became an actor, appearing in several West End shows. Bill travelled with his family to various overseas postings, and lived for a while in Singapore. He was later educated at Churcher's College in Petersfield, while his family lived in Camberley, near Aldershot. Boazman's younger sister, Sally Boazman, is a traffic reporter with BBC Radio 2, popularly known as "Sally Traffic".

Boazman left school in 1965, before sitting A-levels, and moved to Hayling Island, where his girlfriend Jackie Blundell (now writer and traveller Jackie Cornwall) was a student. He was absorbed in music, admiring artists such as Alan Price, Bob Dylan and The Animals, but when he heard Bert Jansch's first (1965) LP; he found his direction. He learned every song on this album, including the difficult track "Angie". At the age of seventeen Boazman first heard "San Francisco Bay Blues" by Jesse Fuller, which led to his enduring love of blues music. In 1965, Boazman returned to Camberley, where he worked on the first edition of Yellow Pages, while establishing contacts in the world of folk and blues.

In June 1966, Boazman and Blundell moved to London together, but their relationship ended shortly afterwards. Boazman performed in folk clubs, including the Hand and Flower in the Fulham Road, and began to make his name as a singer/guitarist. By the late 1960s he lived near Reading, Berkshire and made regular visits to London clubs such as Les Cousins in Soho, where he learnt from Roy Harper, Bert Jansch, Ralph McTell, The Incredible String Band, Davey Graham and many an American guitar picker. At this point, he still did not own a guitar, relying on instruments borrowed from friends and other performers, including John Renbourn, who loaned Boazman the Scarth guitar pictured on the sleeve of Renbourn's first album. Eventually, Boazman purchased a Gibson of his own.

=== Early collaborations ===
==== Heron ====
During the early 1970s, he worked with Heron, alongside a line-up of Michael Cooper – Vocals; Gerald (G.T.) Moore – Guitar, Keyboards, Vocals; Roy Apps – Guitar, Keyboards, Vocals; Mike Finesilver – Bass; Steve Jones – Keyboards; Tony Pook – Percussion, Vocals; Mike Cooper – Guitar; and Terry Gittins – Drums. Boazman appeared on the early Heron albums, but (contrary to some sources) was not formally a member of the band. These albums are now highly collectible, fetching about £150 each.

==== Mike Cooper ====
With Mike Cooper, a contributor the emerging UK country blues scene in the late 1960s, Boazman began playing acoustic and slide guitar on gigs around the UK and Europe. He played on a couple of Cooper's albums on the Dawn label, alongside Danny Thompson, Stefan Grossman, Mike Osborne and Alan Skidmore. He also added his vocals and guitar to albums by Ian A. Anderson.

=== Solo work ===
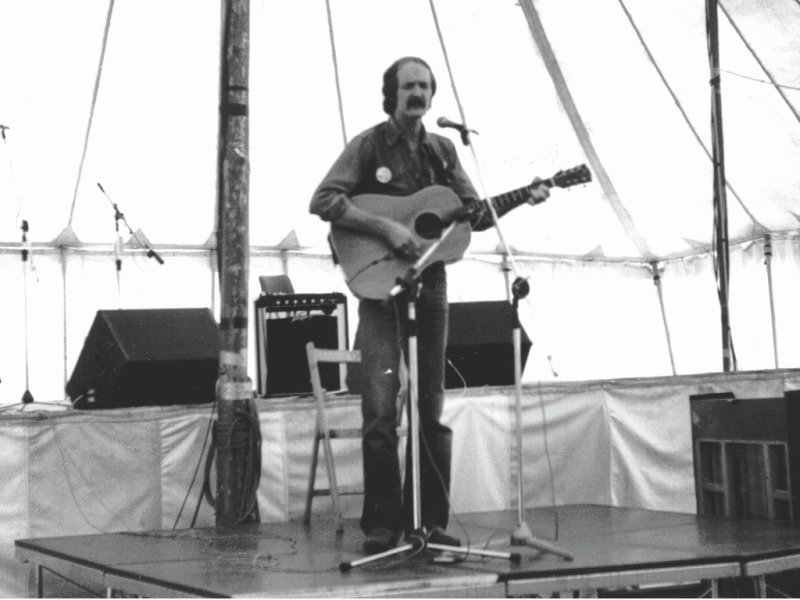
Boazman in singer/songwriter mode at the Bracknell Festival in July 1978

There then followed a period in the 1970s and '80s when Boazman spent much of his time working as a trucker by day and playing solo gigs in the evenings at which he performed mainly self-penned songs with guitar accompaniment, in his distinctive blues-influenced style. Occasionally, during this period, he was accompanied by multi-instrumentalists Tim Pinton and Howard Fullbrook. In 1976, the vocal group BMW (Bower, Morrison & Woollard) invited Boazman (together with Pinton and Fullbrook) to record some tracks during their sessions at Sun Studios in Reading. The songs recorded were "Ballad of Charlie Daniels", "The Worm Forgives the Plough", "Bless These Children" and "The River Waits for No Man (Roll on River)". These tracks are available for download on various sites (iTunes, Napster, Amazon, etc..) from the BMW album called From the Lion to the Plough – The Sun Sessions. There are also recordings of his songs by other artists, such as "The Worm Forgives The Plough", recorded by both Johnny Coppin and Paul Downes; and "Roll on River" recorded by Wizz Jones and Werner Lämmerhirt. Other notable Boazman compositions of this period include "Tall Ship" and "Breaking Even".

=== Sonny Black's Blues Band, Sonny Black and the Dukes ===
Boazman then adopted the persona of "Sonny Black" and formed the first line-up of Sonny Black's Blues Band Dave Bispham on drums, Dick Jones on bass guitar, with Paul Swinton on harmonica and additional vocals. The band's first album, The Filth (recorded in 1983 to 1987), also included guest musicians Graham Hobbs on organ, Ian Smith on bass and Frank Sidebottom on piano. Over the following years, they played their hard Chicago type of blues and acted as the houseband at Dino's Blues Bar at the West End Centre in Aldershot. Here they played with Eddie C. Campbell, Lowell Fulson, Guitar Shorty, Carey Bell and others. Various line-ups featured, at different times, Sam Kelly (drums), Dan Smith (piano), George Pearson (bass), Alan Glenn (harmonica), Dino Coccia and Damon Sawyer (drums) and Bob Haddrell (organ/piano) – some of whom reformed as The Barcodes. Although performing entirely in a traditional blues idiom, most numbers were written by Sonny Black. Over time and through various line-up changes (including a change of name from Sonny Black's Blue Band to Sonny Black and the Dukes), the driving style of the band mellowed and jazz influences became more apparent.

=== Return to acoustic roots ===
In the 2000s, Sonny Black was drawn back to playing just finger picking acoustic and national steel guitar, often accompanied by bassist Chris Belshaw. His repertoire is now a varied selection, including blues, ragtime, jazz standards. He has performed live sessions for BBC Radio 2's Paul Jones and Johnnie Walker shows and, under the name of Bill Boazman, has produced a guitar tutorial DVD, Jazzin' The Blues. His recent recordings are on his own independent label, Free Spirit Records, which he founded in 2002 in Yateley, Hampshire.

During 2008, Sonny Black performed at festivals in France and Italy as well as the UK.

== Selected discography ==
- Heron (Dawn Records) – 1970*‡‡‡
- Twice As Nice & Half The Price (Dawn Records DNLS3025) – 1972*‡‡‡
- From the Lion to the Plough (NYPL Records) – 1978 ****
- The Filth (private pressing) – recorded 1983 to 1987, date of issue not stated**‡
- Smile on the Blues (Roads Records RRCD0001) – 1993 **‡
- Free Spirit (Free Spirit Records FS100) – 1998 **‡‡
- Heart & Soul (Bluetrack Records BRCD004) – 2000 **‡‡
- Blues of a Kind (Free Spirit Records FSCD002) – 2002 **
- The Blue Way (Free Spirit Records FSCD003 tbc) – date tbc **
- The Corner Seat (Free Spirit Records FSCD004) – 2006 **
- The Best of Days (Free Spirit Records FSCD0005) – 2007 **
- DVD – Jazzin' The Blues (Omnibus Media DV10043) – 2003 *

*as Bill Boazman **as Sonny Black
‡with Sonny Black's Blues Band ‡‡with The Dukes ‡‡‡with Heron **** with BMW
