= City of the Sun (band) =

American acoustic post-rock duo

- Origin: New York City
- Genres: Indie rock; acoustic music; post-rock; flamenco; gypsy jazz
- Years active: 2011–present
- Label: Independent
- Members: John Pita; Zach Para
- Past members: Troubadour Adam Road; Avi Snow
- Website: wearecityofthesun.com

City of the Sun is an American acoustic post-rock duo from New York City. Their sound is influenced by several genres, including post-rock, gypsy jazz, flamenco, and indie rock.

== History ==
Formed on the Upper East Side of New York City in 2011, City of the Sun initially consisted of guitarist John Pita and vocalist Troubadour Adam Road, who left the group in 2014. Guitarist Avi Snow joined in 2012. The band is known to have created their signature sound while busking on the streets of New York. After being seen at one of their public performances, the group were invited to perform at the 2013 TED conference and have since also performed at regional TEDx events. Drummer Zach Para joined the group in 2013, and in 2014, they released a live EP titled Live at the Factory.

In 2015, the band was signed to Chesky Records and released their full-length debut, to the sun and all the cities in between, in March 2016. It debuted at No. 12 on the Billboard jazz charts.

After completing a European tour in 2017, the band released their Untitled EP, with the track "Firefly" premiering on Billboard.

2020 saw the release of their second full-length album, City of the Sun.

== Band members ==
Current

- John Pita – guitar (2011–present)
- Zach Para – drums (2013–present)

Past

- Troubadour Adam Road – vocals (2011–2014)
- Avi Snow – guitar (2012–?)

== Discography ==
Studio albums

- to the sun and all the cities in between (2016)
- City of the Sun (2020)
- Under the Moon (2026)

EPs

- Live at the Factory (2014)
- Jefferson St. Sessions (2015)
- Lost Sessions (2016)
- Untitled (2017)
- Chapter I (2019)
- Chapter II (2020)
- Segunda Alma (2022)

Singles

- "Time" (2015)
- "While We Are Young" (2017)
- "Ventura" (2018)
- "Under the Same Sky" (2020)
- "The Last Day" (2020)
