= Allan Taylor (musician) =

English singer-songwriter (born 1945)

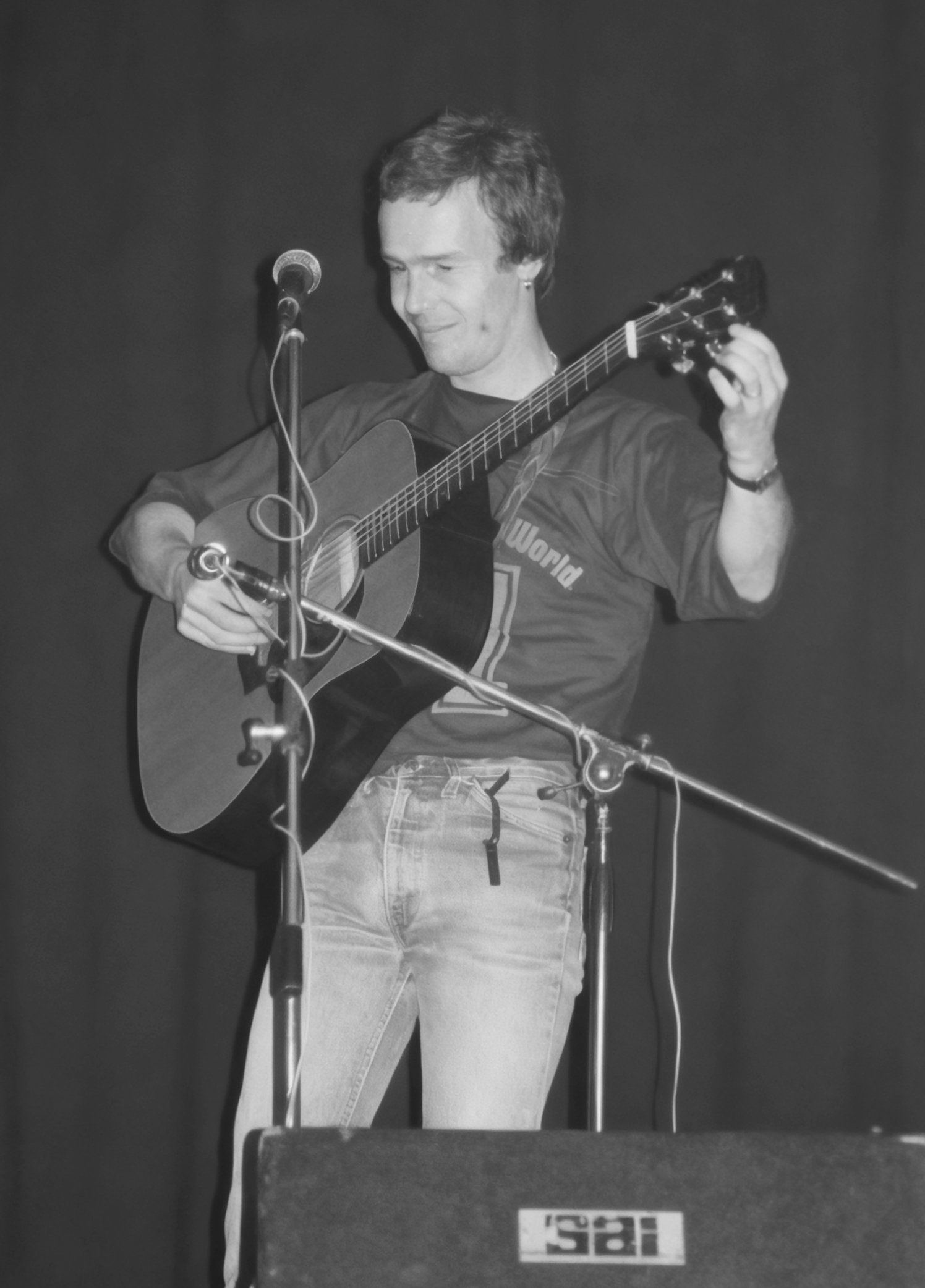
- Taylor on stage in 1981

Background information
- Born: 30 September 1945 (age 80); Brighton, England
- Genres: Folk
- Years active: 1966–present
- Website: allantaylor.com

Allan Taylor (born 30 September 1945 in Brighton, England) is an English singer-songwriter who has written and performed music around the world for over 50 years.

== Career ==
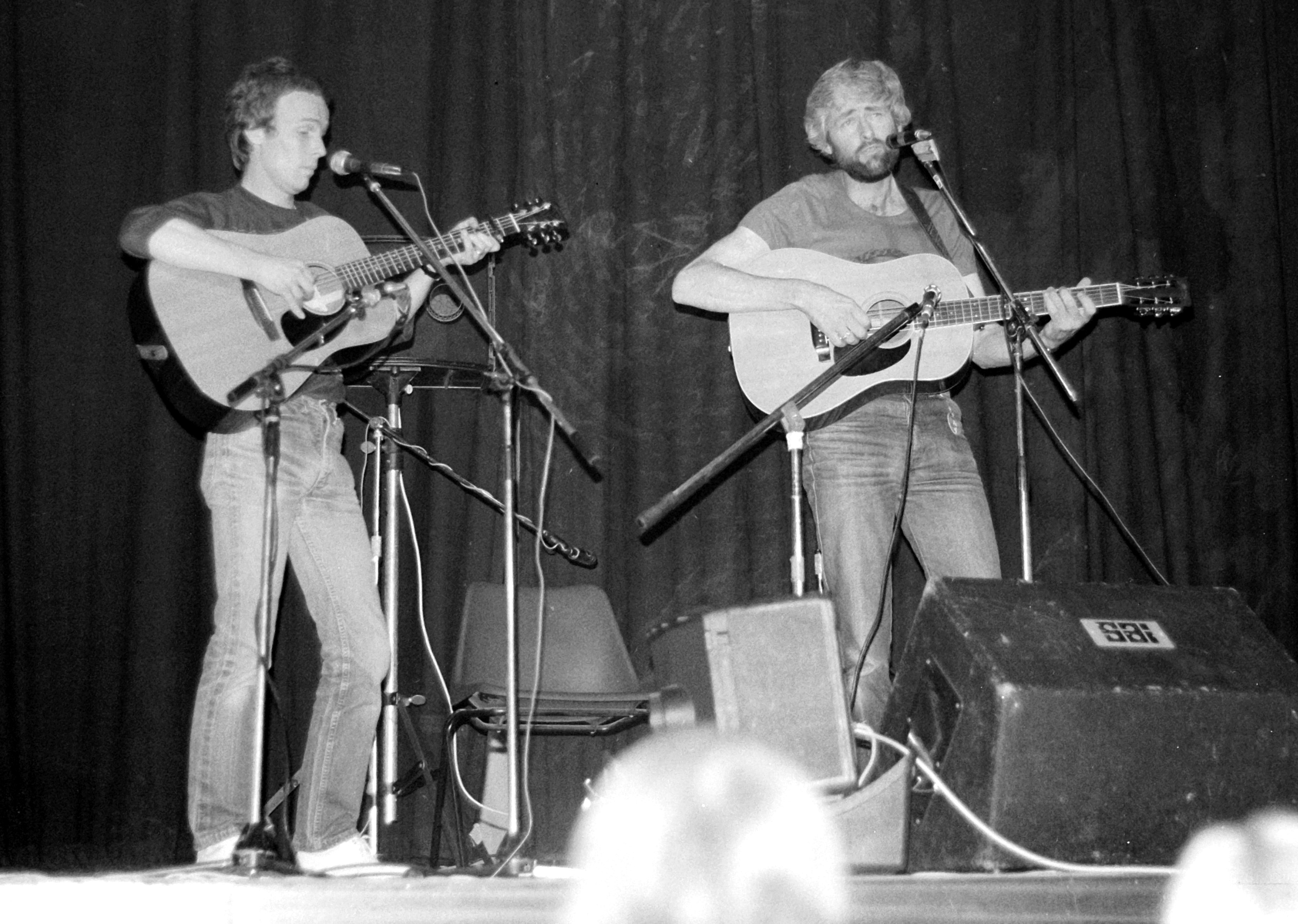
Allan Taylor (L) and Paul Metsers (R), Norwich Festival 1981

Taylor left school in 1961. He was an apprentice in telecommunications until 1965. Inspired by skiffle and the Beat Generation, he started singing and playing guitar in the folk clubs of Brighton through his teenage years. He became a full-time musician in 1966, and left Brighton to become part of the music scene in London. He toured Great Britain, playing various folk clubs, including the Troubadour Club in London, sometimes supporting Fairport Convention. In 1970 he signed a recording contract with United Artists, recording the albums Sometimes (1971) and The Lady (1972).

Taylor moved to New York and became part of the singer-songwriter scene in Greenwich Village, playing at clubs such as Gerde's, The Gaslight Cafe, The Bitter End, the Mercer Arts Center, and The Bottom Line. He toured throughout America and recorded The American Album in Nashville and Los Angeles (1973). He signed to Island Records as a songwriter in 1974. In the mid-1970s, he returned to live in UK, and then formed the band Cajun Moon. He then signed a recording contract with Chrysalis Records and made one LP: Cajun Moon (1976). In 1976, he ended the band and became a solo artist. He made three records with Black Crow/Rubber Records from 1978 to 1983 (The Traveller, winner of the Grand Prix du Disque de Montreaux for best European Record, Roll on the Day, and Circle ‘Round Again). Taylor formed T Records in 1980 and made Win or Lose (1984), Lines (1988), Out of Time (1991), So Long (1993), Faded Light (1995), The Alex Campbell Tribute Concert (1997).

From 1980 to 1992 (whilst continuing as a singer-songwriter, recording/performing artist and working occasionally for the BBC presenting documentary programmes), he earned three academic degrees: a BA from Leeds University, a MA from Lancaster University, and a PhD in ethnomusicology from Queen's University Belfast.

=== 1995–present ===
In 1995, he started his relationship with Stockfisch Records, based in Northeim, Germany, producing Looking for You (1996), Colour to the Moon (2000), Hotels and Dreamers 2003, Old Friends New Roads (2007), Leaving at Dawn (2009), Songs for the Road (2010), All Is One (2013), There was a Time (2016).

To date, there are more than 100 cover versions of his song "It's Good to See You" in ten different languages and numerous cover versions of his other songs, also in many different languages.

Taylor's song "Roll on the Day", developed from his personal experience of visiting with an ex-coal miner and witnessing the effects on him of a lifetime of working in a coal mine.

In The Oxford Book of Traditional Verse, Dr. Frederick Woods comments: "Allan Taylor is one of the more literate and sensitive of contemporary songwriters in terms of words and music, and one who is capable of exploring more complex subjects than most of his contemporaries… he should probably be regarded as potentially the most important songwriter of his generation."

Taylor was due to perform a series of farewell concerts in the summer of 2026 before retiring from the industry but had to cancel due to health problems. In April 2026, he began to receive renewed recognition following an online endorsement by Ed Sheeran. His album The Traveller has since become available on streaming platforms for the first time. Taylor currently resides in Leeds, England.

== Discography ==
- The Lady (1971)
- Sometimes (1971)
- The American Album (1973)
- Cajun Moon (1976)
- The Traveller (1978)
- Roll on the Day (1980)
- Circle Round Again (1983)
- Win or Lose (1984)
- Lines (1988)
- Out of Time (1991)
- So Long (1993)
- Faded Light (1995)
- Looking for You (1996)
- Alex Campbell Tribute Concert (1997)
- Colour to the Moon (2000)
- Out of Time: Remastered (2002)
- Banjoman: Derroll Adams Tribute (2002)
- Hotels & Dreamers (2003)
- Old Friends, New Roads (2007)
- Leaving at Dawn (2009)
- In the Groove (2010)
- Songs for the Road (2010)
- Down the Years I Travelled... (2012)
- Old Friends in Concert (live album with Hannes Wader (2013)
- All Is One (2013)
- There Was a Time (2016)
- Behind the Mix (2017)
