= Werner Lämmerhirt =

German folk singer and guitarist (1949–2016)

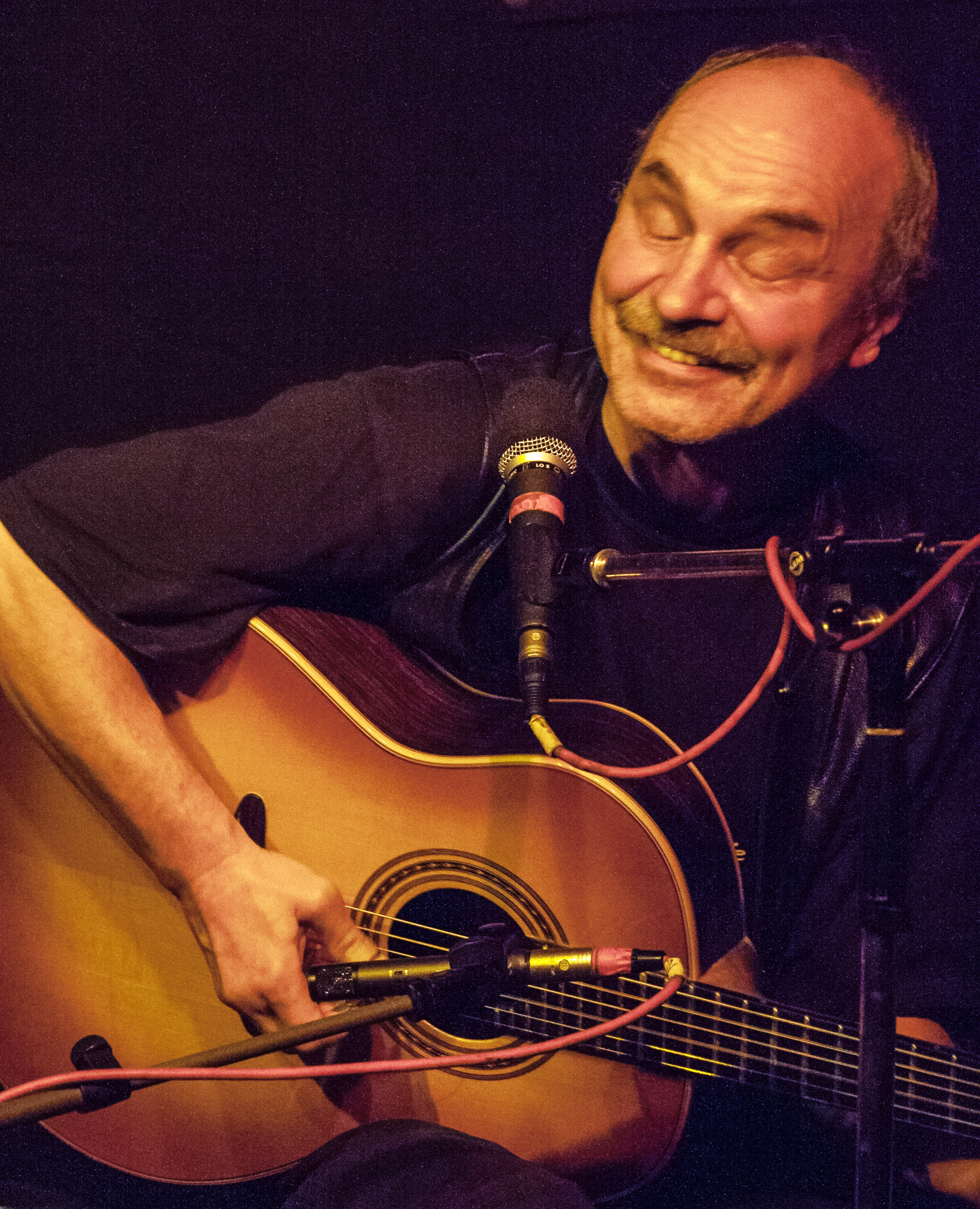
- Lämmerhirt in 2008

Background information
- Born: 17 March 1949; Adlershof, East Berlin
- Died: 14 October 2016 (aged 67) Bodenwerder, Germany
- Genres: Folk music, Blues music
- Years active: 1960s – 2016

Werner Lämmerhirt (17 March 1949 – 14 October 2016) was one of the most important German singer-songwriters and guitarists in the contemporary folk music style. He sang and wrote in both German and English, in a recording career that spanned more than three decades.

== Early life ==
Lämmerhirt was born in Adlershof, East Berlin. Following the arrest of his father for alleged spying in 1957, his mother fled to West Berlin with Werner and his two sisters. They eventually settled in Schlachtensee, Berlin. His father joined the family in West Berlin when Werner was 12 years old, but became violent and drunken; Lämmerhirt believed that experience gave him, in adult life, a strong aversion to violence and injustice which influenced his songwriting. He took up the harmonica and bought his first guitar – a 12 string – when he was 16. Rock and blues clubs were springing up over Berlin in the mid-1960s and Werner picked up playing tips in these. In 1967 he dropped out of school and, accompanied by just his guitar and a sleeping bag, set out to travel around Scandinavia, England and the Netherlands. For 3 years he travelled around Europe, spending the winters back in Berlin, doing whatever work was available, to finance his next trip. His influences at this time were, to begin with, mainstream performers such as the Rolling Stones, Bob Dylan, and Donovan. Later, influences were legendary blues artists such as Big Bill Broonzy and Mississippi John Hurt. At the end of the 1960s, British-style folk clubs had become very popular in Berlin, and Lämmerhirt decided to return to the city where he would spend the day busking in S-bahn stations and the evening playing in folk clubs.

== Early career ==
During this time he met Hannes Wader, who invited him to collaborate with him in making an album, "Ich hatte mir noch so viel vorgenommen". The success of this album led to Lämmerhirt accompanying Wader on tours – his first assignment as a professional musician. Werner collaborated with Wader on three further albums.

== Solo career ==
Lämmerhirt worked as a session musician at this time with artists such as Tom Paxton, Eddie and Finbar Furey and Alex Campbell.

In the winter of 1973–74, Lämmerhirt was approached with a proposal to record his first solo album on a new label, Stockfisch Records. This album, Ten Thousand Miles, was successful and it led to further and larger live performances. Lämmerhirt began to write his own songs at this time, and his second solo album was released in 1975.

Lämmerhirt continued to tour in Germany and released his most recent CD in 2007.

== Discography ==
=== Solo LPs ===
- Ten Thousand Miles (Stockfisch, 1974)
- With Friends—For Friends (Stockfisch, 1975)
- Die Dritte (Stockfisch, 1976)
- White Spots (Froggy Records, 1978)
- All Alone (Froggy Records, 1979)
- Roll On River (with Wizz Jones) (Folk Freak, 1981)
- Crossroads (Froggy Records, 1982)
- Personal Favourites (Froggy Records, 1986)
- White Water (Stockfisch, 1988)

=== Solo CDs ===
- Die frühen Jahre (The Early Years) (Stockfisch, 1991)
- In Between Times (Stockfisch, 1992)
- Collection I (Stockfisch, 1995)
- Collection II (Stockfisch, 1995)
- Mit Pauken und Trompeten (With Timpani and Trumpets) (Stockfisch, 1997)
- SaitenZauber (Magic Strings) (Stockfisch, 1999)
- Heimspiel (Home Game) (Toca Records, 2003)
- Harte Zeiten (Hard Times) (Toca Records, 2007)

=== Other recordings featuring Werner Lämmerhirt ===
- Hannes Wader: Ich hatte mir noch so viel vorgenommen (1971)
- Hannes Wader: 7 Lieder (1972)
- Alex Campbell: Life Is Just That Way (1972)
- Folk-Pub Berlin (1972)
- Guy & Candy Carawan: Sitting On Top Of The World (1973)
- Acoustic Guitar Scene (1975)
- Ingelheim Festival (1975)
- Gitarre’76 (1976)
- Knut Kiesewetter: Fresenhoff (1976)
- Folk Friends I (1978)
- Acoustic Guitar Festival (1979)
- Gitarrenspiele (1980)
- Hannes Wader: Es ist an der Zeit (1980)
- Folk Friends II (1981)
- Hannes Wader: Liebeslieder (1985)
- Hannes Wader: Nie mehr zurück '(1991)
- Davey Arthur: The Big Easy (1996)

== Songbooks ==
- Die frühen Jahre
- Ein Liederbuch

Published by Acoustic Music Records.
