= HDtracks =

Digital music store

- Launch date: March 2008; 17 years ago
- Platform(s): Mac OS X, Microsoft Windows
- Pricing model: $17–$30 (typical album), individual tracks available in some cases
- Website: hdtracks.com

HDtracks is a high-resolution digital music store offering DRM-free music in multiple formats as well as cover art (and liner notes via PDF file downloads for a majority of catalog offerings) with audio CD-quality and high-definition audio master recording quality download selections.

== Origins and expansion ==
The company was privately founded by David and Norman Chesky of the audiophile recording company Chesky Records, and is based in New York, NY. The service was launched on March 21, 2008, initially offering only CD-quality 44.1 kHz audio files in AIFF format from a small offering of independent record labels, including audiophile record company catalogs from Chesky Records, Reference Recordings, 2L, and blues labels like Alligator Records. Shortly after its initial launch, HDtracks began offering higher sample-rate and bit-rate recordings such as 96 kHz/24bit, 192 kHz/24bit and other sound files with higher resolution than a CD, with a focus on jazz, classical music, soft rock, and historic recordings targeting adult consumers looking for an alternative to lesser-quality compressed mp3 files.

== Timeline ==
- On March 21, 2008, HDtracks is officially launched.
- In October 2008, HDtracks releases its first catalog offerings in 88.2k/24-bit and 96k/24-bit FLAC formats.
- On April 1, 2010, HDtracks added selections from Concord Music Group catalog of high-resolution music.
- On April 15, 2010, HDtracks launches Verve Records from Universal Music Group, marking the first major label to establish sales of high-resolution, non-DRM-restricted music through HDtracks.
- On November 2, 2010, HDtracks releases Paul McCartney's album Band on the Run in 96 kHz/24-bit FLAC format.
- On March 2, 2011, HDtracks releases ABKCO's Remastered Series of early Rolling Stones recordings.
- On July 1, 2011, HDtracks launches with Warner Music Group, making it the second major record label to distribute DRM-free, high-resolution audio downloads through the service.
- On November 15, 2012, HDtracks launches catalog selections from Sony Legacy, making Sony the 4th major label to join the service. Notable artists include Carole King, Janis Joplin, Michael Jackson, and Bob Dylan.
- On January 23, 2013, HDtracks replaced its multiplatform Java Network Launching Protocol (JNLP) downloader application to native applications for Windows and Mac created by JRiver, thereby making it impossible for users of other platforms such as Linux to download their purchases at this time.
- On September 10, 2014, HDtracks launched sites in the UK and Germany.
- On October 21, 2014, a downloader application for Linux appears on the JRiver support forum.
- On December 15, 2017, HDTracks released The Beatles' Sgt. Pepper's Lonely Hearts Club Band in high resolution.
- In April 2020 HDtracks announced that the UK hdtracks.co.uk website would close on April 30, 2020.
