= David Chesky =

- Born: October 29, 1956; Miami, Florida, U.S.
- Genres: Jazz, classical, contemporary classical, Latin music, jazz fusion, world fusion
- Occupations: Musician, composer, record producer, label owner
- Instrument: Piano
- Years active: 1974–present
- Label: Chesky
- Website: www.davidchesky.com

David Chesky is an American pianist, composer, producer, arranger, and co-founder of the independent, audiophile label Chesky Records. He is also co-founder and CEO of HDtracks, an online music store that sells high-resolution digital music.

Chesky is considered a technological and musical innovator with eclectic interests. He has won Independent Music Awards and received Grammy Award nominations. He has written jazz tunes, orchestral and chamber music, opera, ballet, and a rap symphony.

== Beginnings ==
At his mother's insistence, Chesky started piano lessons at the age of 5. In his teens he had less interest in rock and roll music, with its verse-chorus structure, than in classical and jazz. He liked Oscar Peterson, the Buddy Rich Big Band, George Gershwin, and the Latin music he heard while growing up in Miami. In 1974, at the age of 17, he moved to New York City to pursue a career as a musician. He studied privately with classical composer David Del Tredici and jazz pianist John Lewis.

== Writing, recording, and performing ==
In 1978, he formed a jazz fusion group called the David Chesky Big Band, which included Michael Brecker, Randy Brecker, and Bob James, and released the album Rush Hour. During the next ten years, Chesky made a living writing music for TV movies and commercials, continuing to learn from older composers. Another jazz fusion album, Club de Sol, appeared in 1989, his first album on his own Chesky label. His next two albums, The New York Chorinhos (1990) and The Tangos and Dances (1992), were collaborations with Brazilian guitarist Romero Lubambo in which he took traditional Brazilian forms and combined them with elements of jazz and classical music.

In 1997 he created the Chesky Records Kids division to encourage children to listen to classical music. The first release was Classical Cats: A Children's Introduction to the Orchestra (1997), followed by Snowbears of Lake Louise (1998). Other works for children include the ballet The Zephyrtine (2013) and the opera The Mice War. He has written songs for soperano, mezzo and orchestra, multiple oratorios, three comic operas for adults: The Pig, the Farmer, and the Artist, La Farranucci, Juliet & Romeo, and one dramatic opera Snow White and the Queen. In addition to composing classical music David plays piano in his multiple jazz groups, Jazz in the New Harmonic, The Great European Songbook Trio, and his New York Latin Descagra trio.

== Chesky Records, HDtracks, and The Audiophile Society ==
In 1986 Chesky visited the classical pianist Earl Wild, a friend of an uncle, to learn more about writing music. Wild gave him an album of Rachmaninoff that had been recorded for Reader's Digest. Unimpressed with the quality of the recording, he asked Wild if he could hear the original master tape. After hearing better sound on the master, Chesky became interested in reissuing recordings. With his brother Norman he formed Chesky Records. Soon after, the label began producing its own albums, starting with Live from Studio A in New York City in 1988 featuring jazz violinist Johnny Frigo and father-son jazz guitarists Bucky Pizzarelli and John Pizzarelli.

Chesky albums are recorded live, sometimes in churches, often with custom-made equipment, and don't undergo post-recording polishing, overdubbing, and mixing. This arrangement reflects David Chesky's desire to make albums that approximate the original performance. In 2012, he began using a technique called binaural recording, or what he called binaural-plus, in an attempt to capture the spaciousness of three-dimensional live sound.

David Chesky and Norman Chesky, entered the music download business in 2008 when they opened HDtracks, an online music store that sells high-definition (HD), i.e. high-resolution, music. The Cheskys believe higher-resolution tracks sound better than typical mp3 files, which are compressed when transferred from the CD source. HDtracks sold CD-quality music files (44.1 kHz, 16-bit) before adding music with higher sample rates (88/24, 96/24, 176/24, 192/24) and other formats (AIFF, ALAC, FLAC, WAV). In 2021 David created https://theaudiophilesociety.com/ to record music in his own mega-dimensional sound, a variation of 3D spatial audio.

In 2016, Chesky Records produced Macy Gray's first jazz record entitled Stripped.

== Awards and honors ==
Chesky has won two Independent Music Awards, both for best Contemporary Classical Album: String Theory (2011) and Rap Symphony (2014). He has been nominated for two Grammy Awards, Best Engineered Album, Classical for Area 31 (2005); Best Classical Contemporary Composition for Concerto for Bassoon and Orchestra on the album Urban Concertos (2007); and one Latin Grammy Award for Best Latin Jazz Album, The Body Acoustic (2004).

He won the composer's award from the Lancaster Symphony Orchestra and was composer-in-residence for the National Symphony Orchestra of Taiwan.

== List of musical works ==
=== Urban concertos ===
- "Rap Symphony"
- "Concerto for Violin and Cello"
- "Concerto for Violin and Orchestra"
- "Concerto No. 2 for Violin and Orchestra"
- "Concerto No. 3 for Violin and Orchestra, The Klezmer"
- "Concerto for Viola and Orchestra"
- "Concerto for Cello and Orchestra"
- "Concerto for Orchestra"
- "Concerto for Trumpet and Orchestra"
- "The Manhattan Suite for Trumpet and Orchestra"
- "Concerto for Flute and Orchestra"
- "Concerto No. 2 for Flute and Orchestra"
- "Concerto for Clarinet and Orchestra"
- "Concerto for Bassoon and Orchestra"
- "Concerto No.1 for Piano and Orchestra"
- "Concerto No. 2 for Piano and Orchestra
- "Concerto No. 3 for Piano and Orchestra"
- "Concerto for Two Guitars and Orchestra"
- "Concerto for Guitar and Orchestra"
- "Concerto for Electric Guitar and Orchestra"
- "Concerto for Bass Trombone and Orchestra"
- "American Bluegrass"

=== Symphonic and ballet music ===
- "Urbanicity"
- "New York Variations"
- "The Abreu Danzas"

Central Park Dances

- "Dance No. 1 for Orchestra"
- "Dance No. 2 for Orchestra"
- "Dance No. 3 for Orchestra"
- "The Zephyrtine Children's Ballet"
- "String Theory
- "Hope"
- "The Venetian Concertos 1–4"

=== Chamber music ===
- "American Bluegrass"
- "String Quartet No. 1"
- "Street Beats"
- "Duo for Bassoon and Bass Trombone"

=== Vocal music ===
- "The Spanish Poems"
- "The Girl from Guatemala"
- "The Romance of Love"
- "Sonnet No. 5"
- "Songs of New York "
- "Poems of Paradise "

=== Opera ===
- "The Pig, The Farmer, and The Artist"
- "Juliet & Romeo"
- "La Farranucci"
- "Snow White and the Queen"

=== Opera for children ===
- "The Mice War"

=== Choral music ===
- "Power and Innocence"
- "The Agnostic"
- "The Excommunication Mass"

Spiritual Works

Joy and Sorrow

- "Arbeit Macht Frei"
- "The Fiddle Maker"
- "Betty's March"
- "Dora's Dance"
- "Concerto No. 3 for Violin and Orchestra, The Klezmer"
- "The Wiener Psalm"

=== Piano ===
- The New York Rags
- "Rag No. 1 "The New Yorker"
- "Rag No. 2 "The Bernstein"
- "Rag No. 3 "The Duke"
- "Rag No. 4 "Times Square"
- "Rag No. 5 "Fourth Street"
- "Rag No. 6 "Third Avenue"
- "Rag No. 7 "Broadway Boogie Woogie"
- "Rag No. 8 "Fifth Avenue"
- "Rag No. 9 "Grand Central Morning "
- "Rag No. 10 " Seventh Avenue"
- "Rag No. 11 "The Circle at Fifth "
- "Rag No. 12 "The Park Avenue Rag"
- "Rag No. 13 "The Thanksgiving Day Parade Rag in 7/4"
- "Rag No. 14 "Kids Your Late For School Rag"
- "Rag No. 15 "The Manhattan Blues Variations Rag"
- "Rag No. 16 "Penn Station"
- "Rag No. 17 "The J Walker Rag"
- "Rag No. 18 "The Coney Island Rag"

The Brazilian Dances

- "Dance No.6"
- "Dance No. 7"
- "Dance No. 8"
- "Etude No. 1"

The New York Chorinhos

- A collection of 16 Chorinhos for solo piano

The Tango and Dances

- "Dance No. 1 for solo piano"
- "Dance No. 2 for solo piano"
- "Dance No. 3 for solo piano"
- "Dance No. 4 for solo piano"
- "Dance No. 5 for solo piano"
- "Chorinho No. 7 for solo piano"
- "Chorinho No. 18 for solo piano"
- "Chorinho No. 19 for solo piano"
- "Tango No. 1 for solo piano"
- "Tango No. 2 for solo piano"

The Fantasies

- "Fantasy No. 1 for solo piano"
- "Fantasy No. 2 for solo piano"
- "Fantasy No. 3 for solo piano"
- "Fantasy No. 4 for solo piano"
- "Fantasy No. 5 for solo piano"
- "Choro No. 20 for solo piano"
- "Choro No. 21 for solo piano"

=== Neo–romantic orchestral works ===
- "Psalm 1 for String Orchestra"
- "Psalm 2 for String Orchestra & Cello Soloist"
- "Psalm 3 for String Orchestra"
- "Psalm 4 – Sorrow"
- "Psalm 5 – Aftermath"
- "Psalm 6 – Rage & Despair"

=== Brass music ===
- "Central Park Morning"

== Film works ==
- The Mice War Movie- Director

== Discography ==
- The Great European Songbook (The Audiophile Society, 2022)
- The Excommunication Mass (The Audiophile Society, 2022)
- Graffiti Jazz (The Audiophile Society, 2022)
- Songs for a Broken World (Chesky, 2021)
- Espana, The Guitar Concertos (Chesky, 2019)
- Trio in the New Harmonic, Aural Paintings (Chesky, 2018)
- The Spanish Poems (Chesky, 2018)
- Piano Concertos 2 & 3 (Chesky, 2016)
- The Venetian Concertos (Chesky, 2016)
- Joy and Sorrow (Chesky 2016)
- Brazil Dances for Piano (Chesky 2015)
- Primal Scream (Chesky, 2015)
- Rap Symphony (Chesky, 2014)
- Jazz in the New Harmonic (Chesky, 2013)
- The Zephyrtine: A Ballet Story (Chesky, 2013)
- The New York Rags (Chesky, 2012)
- String Theory (Chesky, 2011)
- Urbanicity (Chesky, 2010)
- Urban Concertos (Chesky, 2007)
- Area 31 (Chesky, 2005)
- The Body Acoustic (Chesky, 2004)
- The Agnostic (Chesky, 2000)
- Psalms 4, 5, and 6: Remembrance for the Victims of the Modern Holocausts (Chesky, 2000)
- Three Psalms for String Orchestra (Chesky, 1997)
- The Fantasies (Chesky, 1995)
- The Tangos and Dances (Chesky, 1992)
- The New York Chorinhos (Chesky, 1990)
- Club del Sol (Chesky, 1989)
- Rush Hour (Chesky, 1980)

== Awards ==
- 2013 Lancaster Symphony Composer's Award
- 2008 Grammy nomination of Best Classical Contemporary Composition for "Concerto for Bassoon and Orchestra"
- 2005 Latin Grammy nomination of Best Latin Jazz Album for The Body Acoustic
- 2005 Grammy nominations of Best Engineered Classical Recording:
  - "Concertos For Violin And Orchestra"
  - "Concertos For Flute And Orchestra"
  - "The Girl from Guatemala"
