= Chesky Records =

US record label

- Founded: 1986
- Founder: David Chesky; Norman Chesky
- Distributor: E1 Music
- Genre: Various
- Country of origin: U.S.
- Location: New York, New York
- Official website: www.chesky.com

Chesky Records is a record company and label founded in 1986 by brothers David and Norman Chesky. The company produces high-definition recordings of music in a variety of genres, including jazz, classical, pop, R&B, folk and world/ethnic. Chesky artists include McCoy Tyner, Herbie Mann, David Johansen and the Harry Smiths, Joe Henderson, Macy Gray, Chuck Mangione, Paquito D'Rivera, Ron Carter, Larry Coryell, John Pizzarelli, Bucky Pizzarelli, Babatunde Olatunji, Ana Caram, and Rebecca Pidgeon.

Chesky Records also offers binaural recordings, which seeks to replicate 3-D stereo sound so that the recording sounds as if the listener is in the same room with the musicians. They capture this sound using dummy head recording. For its recordings, Chesky Records uses acoustically vibrant spaces, including the Hirsch Center in Greenpoint, Brooklyn and St. Paul the Apostle Church located in Manhattan.

The company has a mastering studio in New York City, New York.

== History ==
Studio musician and composer David Chesky founded Chesky Records with his brother Norman in 1986. They began the label to preserve the sound of live-in-the studio recordings, without overdubbing original records. In 1990, they switched from recording in studios to recording in churches. One of the company's first attempts at improving sound quality was the re-issue of classical pianist Earl Wild's recordings of Rachmaninoff for Reader's Digest.

In 1990, Chesky Records released its Jazz Sampler & Audiophile Test Compact Disc, with the first nine tracks devoted to music and the remaining twenty devoted to listening and technical tests for headphones and loud speakers. Other test discs include Dr. Chesky's Sensational, Fantastic, and Simply Amazing Binaural Sound Show and the Ultimate Demo Disc.

In 2007, David and Norman Chesky also started an audiophile music download website called HDtracks. HDtracks allows customers to download high-resolution versions of albums in numerous formats (FLAC, AIFF). The site contains many varied artists and labels. In 2012, Crosby, Stills, and Nash announced that they would be releasing HD versions of its first three albums through HDtracks, and the company also released remastered titles from the Blue Note label, including John Coltrane's Blue Train, Eric Dolphy's Out To Lunch, Herbie Hancock's Maiden Voyage, Wayne Shorter's Speak No Evil, Horace Silver's Song for My Father and Larry Young's Unity. Other notable artists include Carole King, Janis Joplin, Michael Jackson, the Rolling Stones and Bob Dylan.

In 2011, Chesky Records incorporated High Resolution Technology in their label and introduced binaural recordings. The Binaural+ masters are captured in high-resolution (24-bit/192 kHz) sound using a binaural dummy head nicknamed "Lars". David Chesky collaborated with Princeton professor Edgar Y. Choueiri to begin producing binaural recordings. The purpose of the technology is to capture three-dimensional sound and imaging.

In 2016, Chesky Records released the critically acclaimed jazz debut of Macy Gray, Stripped, which debuted No. 3 on the Billboard Jazz Charts. The label also released the debut album from City of the Sun, which debuted No. 12 on the Billboard Jazz Charts, would go on to garner over 17 million album streams on Spotify and peak at No. 2 on the Spotify US Viral 50.

In 2018, Casey Abrams and Meiko signed with Chesky Records. Abrams' debut album for the label, Put a Spell on You, hit #5 on the Billboard Jazz Charts, and Meiko hit #23 on the Billboard Folk Charts with Playing Favorites.

In 2019, Anna Nalick signed with Chesky Records and released her label debut The Blackest Crow that December.

Chesky Records uses custom recording equipment and experiments with recording techniques and formats.

== Artists ==
- Camille Thurman
- Casey Abrams
- City of the Sun
- Macy Gray
- Meiko

== Awards and recognition ==
- 1997 Grammy Award for Best Latin Jazz Performance – Portraits of Cuba, Paquito D'Rivera
- 1998 Nominated: Grammy Award for Best World Music Album – Love Drum Talk, Babatunde Olatunji
- 2000 Latin Grammy Award for Best Latin Jazz Album – Tropicana Nights, Paquito D'Rivera
- 2005 Nominated: Grammy Award for Best Engineered Classical Recording – Area 31, David Chesky
- 2005 Nominated: Latin Grammy Award for Best Latin Jazz Album – The Body Acoustic, David Chesky
- 2007 Nominated: Grammy Award for Best Classical Contemporary Composition – Concerto for Bassoon and Orchestra, David Chesky
- 2013 Independent Music Award – Contemporary Classical Album – String Theory, David Chesky
- 2015 Independent Music Award – Contemporary Classical Album – Rap Symphony, David Chesky
- 2016 Independent Music Award – Jazz Vocal Album – Stripped, Macy Gray
- 2016 Nominated: Independent Music Award – Contemporary Classical Album – The Venetian Concertos, David Chesky
- 2019 Nominated: Independent Music Award - Contemporary Classical Album - Piano Concertos 2,3, David Chesky
- 2019 Nominated: Independent Music Award - Tribute Album - Playing Favorites, Meiko
- 2019 Nominated: Independent Music Award - Cover Song - "Super Freak" (Meiko)

== See also ==
- List of record labels
- David Chesky
- HDtracks
