= Grammy Award for Best Latin Jazz Album =

Honor presented to recording artists for quality Latin jazz albums

- Awarded for: Quality performances in the Latin jazz music genre
- Country: United States
- Presented by: National Academy of Recording Arts and Sciences
- First award: 1995
- Currently held by: Gonzalo Rubalcaba, Yainer Horta & Joey Calveiro – A Tribute to Benny Moré and Nat King Cole (2026)
- Website: grammy.com

The Grammy Award for Best Latin Jazz Album is an award presented at the Grammy Awards, a ceremony that was established in 1958 and originally called the Gramophone Awards, to recording artists for quality works (songs or albums) in the Latin jazz music genre. Honors in several categories are presented at the ceremony annually by the National Academy of Recording Arts and Sciences of the United States to "honor artistic achievement, technical proficiency and overall excellence in the recording industry, without regard to album sales or chart position".

Originally called the Grammy Award for Best Latin Jazz Performance, the award was first presented to Arturo Sandoval in 1995. The name of the category was changed to Best Latin Jazz Album in 2001, the same year producers, engineers, and/or mixers associated with the winning work became award recipients in addition to the recording artists. According to the category description guide for the 52nd Grammy Awards, the award is presented to "vocal or instrumental albums containing at least 51% playing time of newly recorded material," with the intent to recognize the "blending" of jazz music with Argentinian, Brazilian, Iberian-American, and Latin tango music. Beginning in 1998, members of the Latin Academy of Recording Arts & Sciences (LARAS) are eligible to vote in the Latin categories, including Best Latin Jazz Album.

As of 2026, Chucho Valdés has the most wins in this category, with five. Arturo O'Farrill has won four, Paquito D'Rivera and Gonzalo Rubalcaba have won three, and two-time recipients include Sandoval, Charlie Haden, Eliane Elias, Eddie Palmieri and Chick Corea. Since its inception, the award has been presented to musicians or groups originating from Brazil, Cuba, Puerto Rico, the Dominican Republic, the United States, and Venezuela.

The award was not presented in 2012 as part of a major overhaul of Grammy categories; Latin jazz recordings were shifted to either the Best Jazz Instrumental Album or Best Jazz Vocal Album categories. However, following protests and a lawsuit made by Latin jazz musicians Bobby Sanabria, Eugene Marlow, Ben Lapidus, and Mark Levine filed by attorney Roger Maldonado, the Recording Academy reinstated the category the following year, 2013, for the 55th Grammy Awards.

== Recipients ==
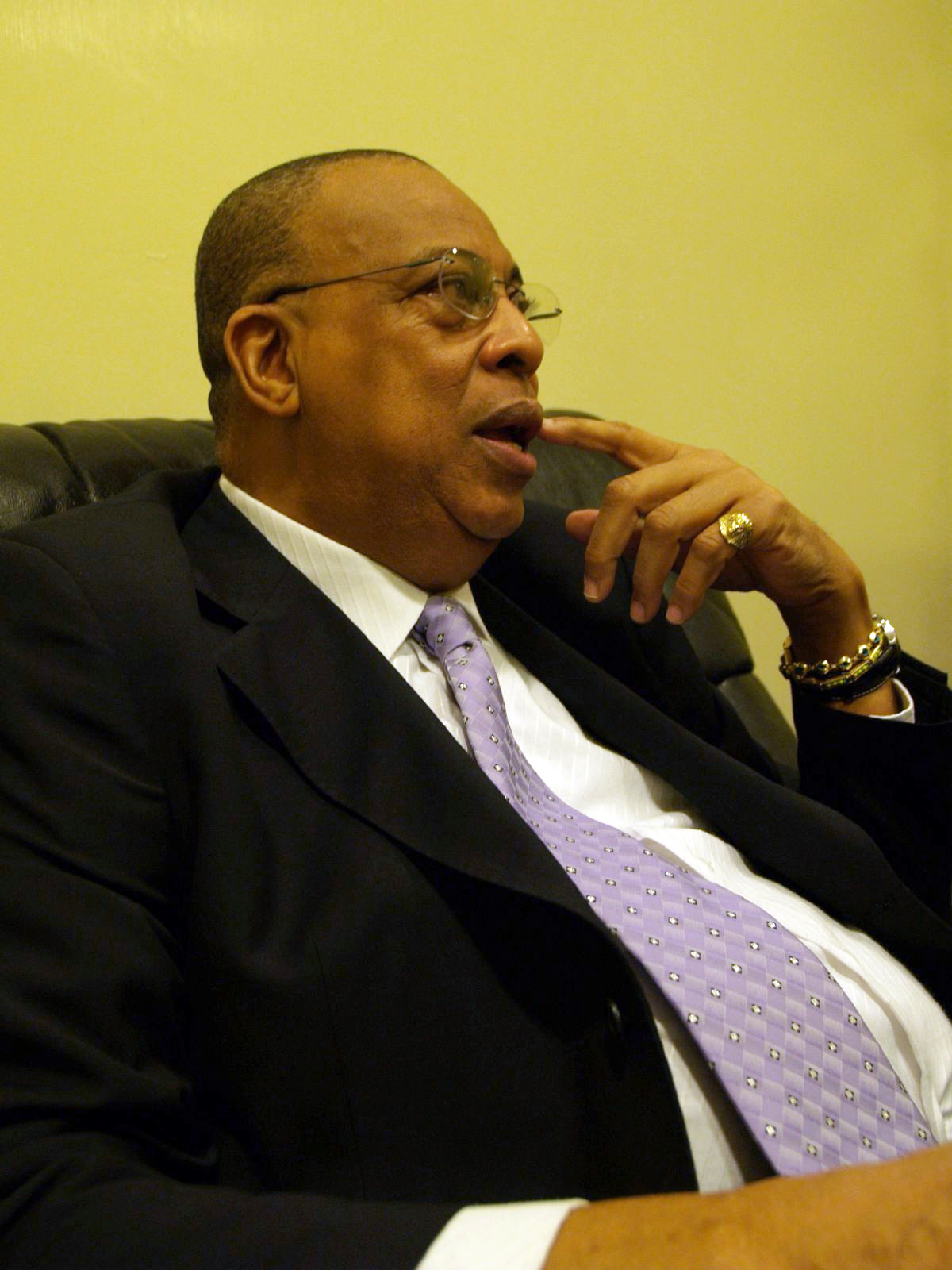
Five-time winner Chucho Valdés

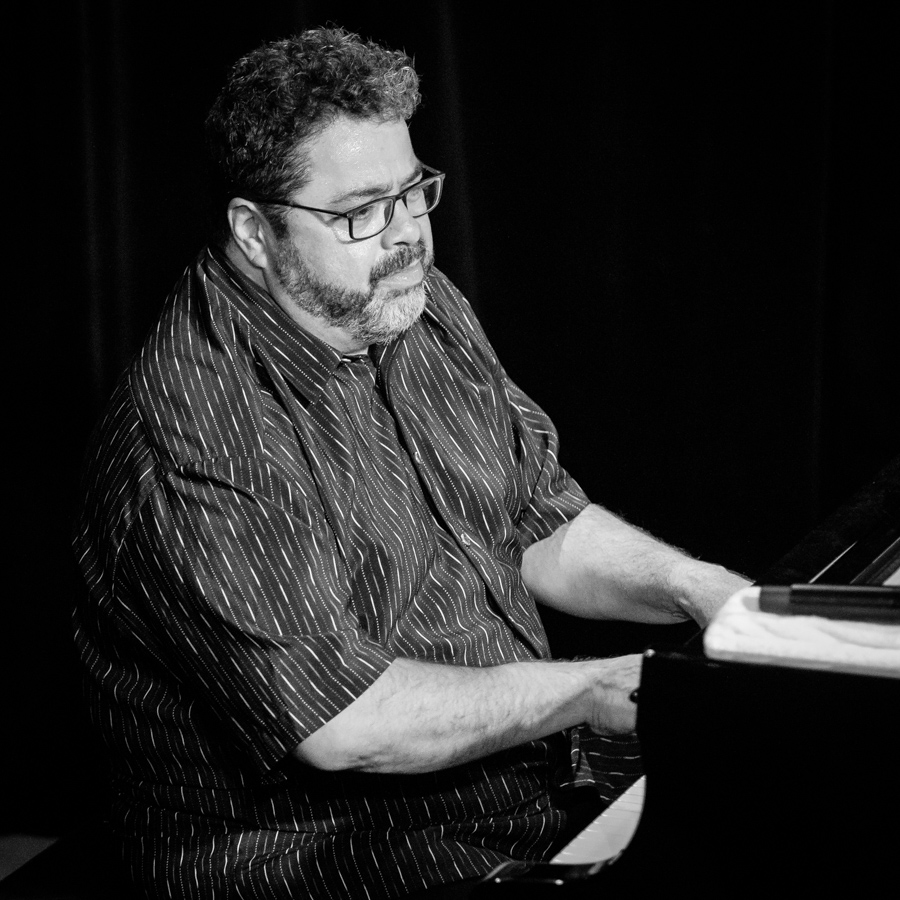
Four-time winner Arturo O'Farrill

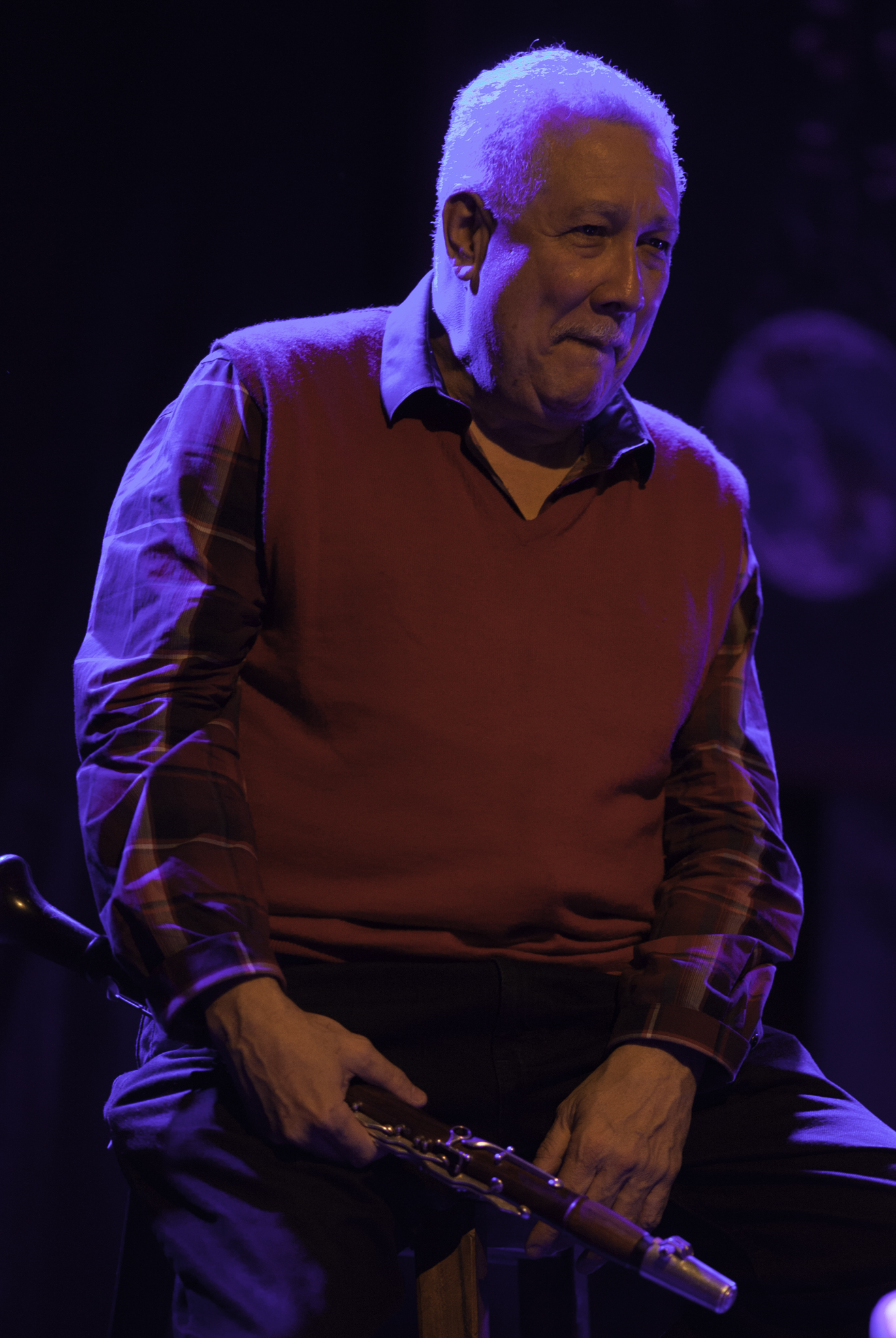
Three-time winner, Paquito D'Rivera

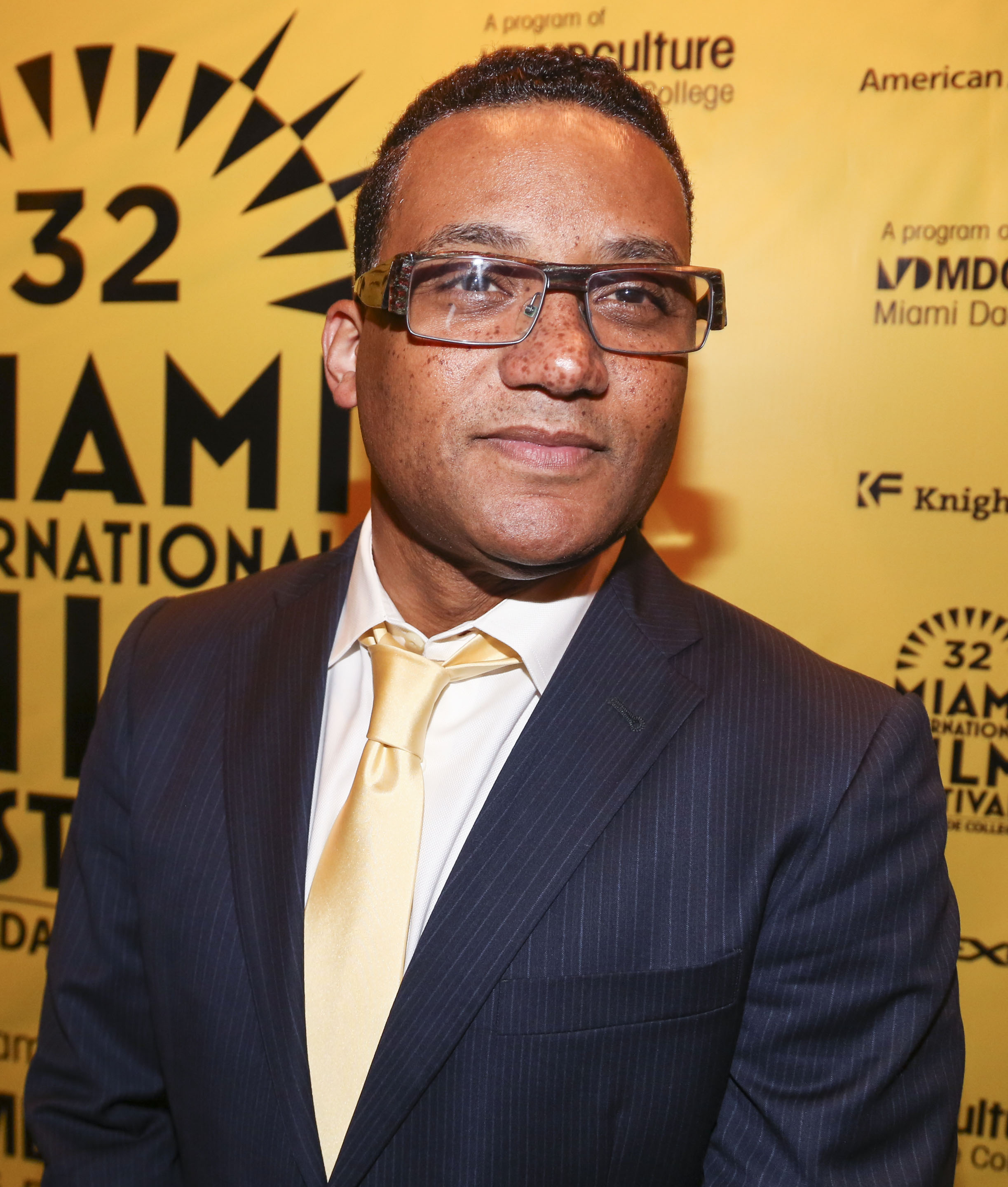
Three-time winner, Gonzalo Rubalcaba

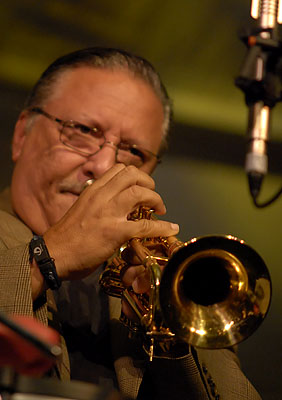
Two-time award winner Arturo Sandoval

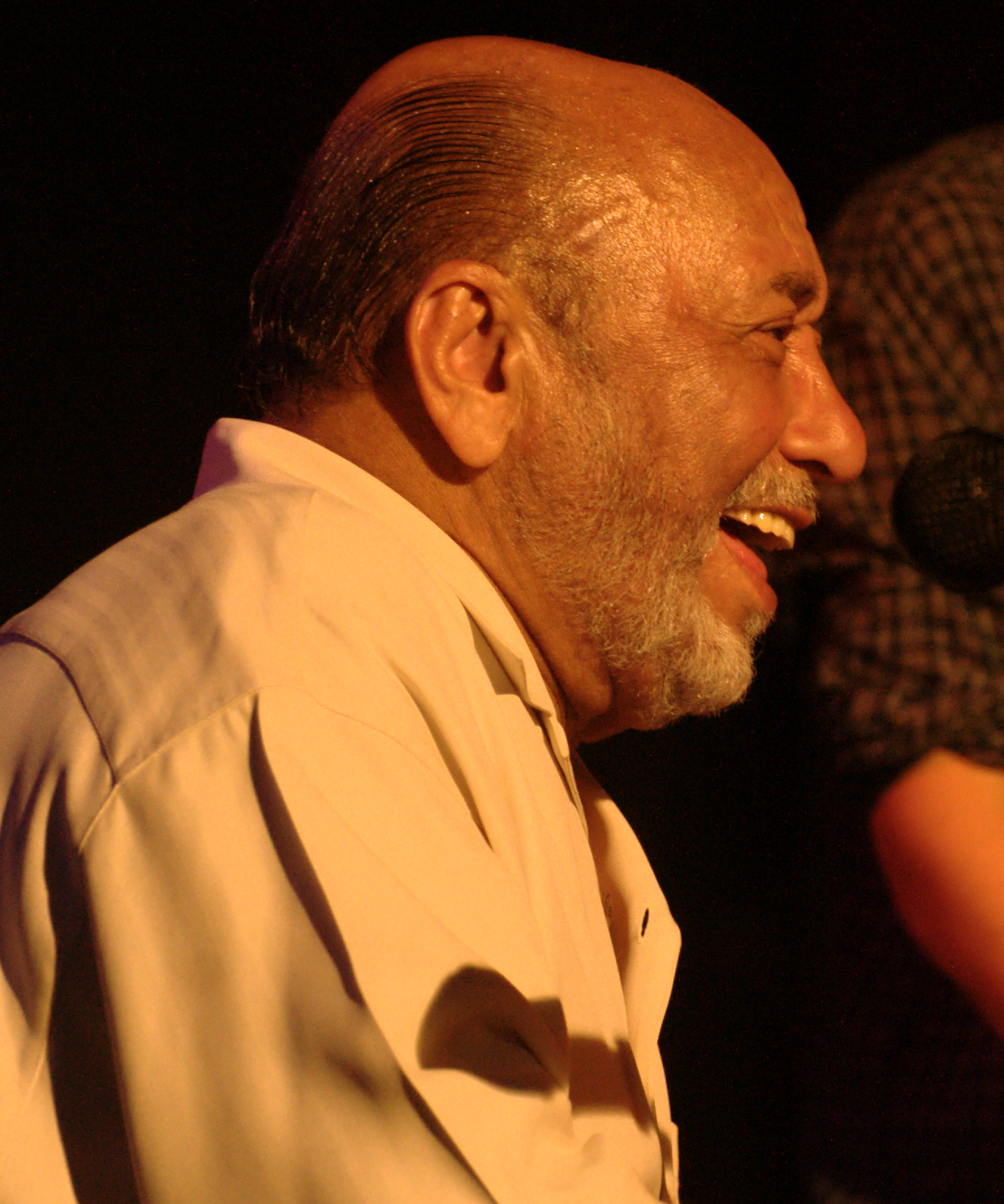
Two-time winner, Eddie Palmieri

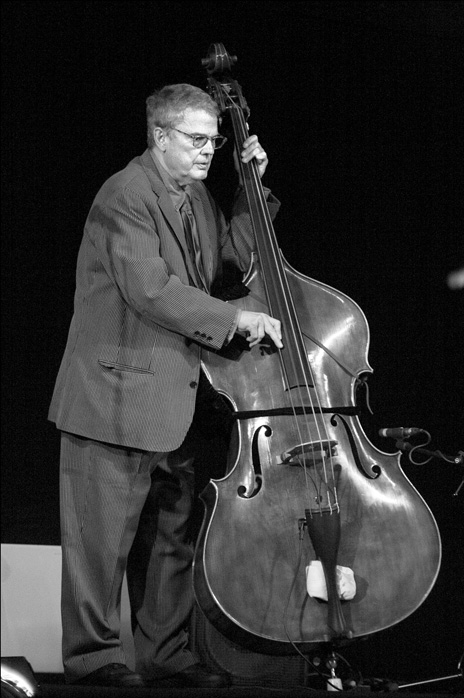
Two-time award winner Charlie Haden

Recipients
Year^{[I]}	Performing artist(s)	Work	Nominees	Ref.
1995	Arturo Sandoval	Danzón (Dance On)	Ray Barretto & New World Spirit – Taboo; Mario Bauza and the Afro-Cuban Jazz Orchestra – 944 Columbus; Jerry González and the Fort Apache Band – Crossroads; Eddie Palmieri – Palmas	
1996	Jobim	Antônio Brasileiro	Jerry Gonzalez and the Fort Apache Band – Pensativo; Chico O'Farrill and His Afro-Cuban Jazz Orchestra – Pure Emotion; Eddie Palmieri – Arete; Patato and Changuito y Orestes – Ritmo y Candela: Rhythm at the Crossroads	
1997	Paquito D'Rivera	Portraits of Cuba	Ray Barretto – My Summertime; Steve Berrios and Son Bacheche – And Then Some!; Terence Blanchard and Ivan Lins – The Heart Speaks; Don Grolnick – Medianoche	
1998	Roy Hargrove's Crisol	Habana	Conrad Herwig – The Latin Side of John Coltrane; Giovanni Hidalgo – Hands of Rhythm; Banda Mantiqueira – Aldeia; Carlos "Patato" Valdes – Ritmo y Candela II: African Crossroads	
1999	Arturo Sandoval	Hot House	Ray Barretto and New World Spirit – Contact; Paquito D'Rivera and the United Nation Orchestra – Paquito D'Rivera and the United Nation Orchestra; Danilo Pérez – Central Avenue; David Sánchez – Obsession; Chucho Valdés – Bele Bele en la Habana	
2000	Poncho Sanchez	Latin Soul	Al McKibbon – Tumbao Para los Congueros di Mi Vida; Bobby Rodríguez – Latin Jazz Explosion; Gonzalo Rubalcaba and Cuban Quartet – Antiguo; Chucho Valdés – Briyumba Palo Congo – Religion of the Congo	
2001	Chucho Valdés	Live at the Village Vanguard	Bobby Sanabria Big Band – Afro-Cuban Dream... Live & in Clave; Gary Burton – Libertango: The Music of Ástor Piazzolla; Danilo Pérez – Motherland; David Sánchez – Melaza	
2002	Charlie Haden and Gonzalo Rubalcaba	Nocturne	Los Hombres Calientes (Irvin Mayfield and Bill Summers) – Vol. 3: New Congo Square; Gonzalo Rubalcaba Trio – Supernova; David Sánchez – Travesía; Various artists – Calle 54	
2003	Dave Samuels and the Caribbean Jazz Project	The Gathering	Jane Bunnett – Alma de Santiago; Duduka Da Fonseca – Samba Jazz Fantasia; John Santos and the Machete Ensemble – S.F. Bay; Omar Sosa – Sentir	
2004	Michel Camilo, Charles Flores, and Horacio Hernández	Live at the Blue Note	Jane Bunnett – Cuban Odyssey; Caribbean Jazz Project – Birds of a Feather; Mark Levine and the Latin Tinge – Isla; Chucho Valdés – New Conceptions	
2005	Charlie Haden and Gonzalo Rubalcaba	Land of the Sun	Raphael Cruz – Bebop Timba; Jerry Gonzalez y los Piratas del Flamenco – Jerry Gonzalez y los Piratas del Flamenco; Conrad Herwig Nonet – Another Kind of Blue: The Latin Side of Miles Davis; Diego Urcola – Soundances	
2006	Eddie Palmieri	Listen Here!	Ray Barretto – Time Was – Time Is; Caribbean Jazz Project featuring Dave Samuels – Here and Now – Live in Concert; Sammy Figueroa and His Latin Jazz Explosion – ...And Sammy Walked In; Omar Sosa – Mulatos	
2007	The Brian Lynch/Eddie Palmieri Project	Simpático	Ignacio Berroa – Codes; Edsel Gómez – Cubist Music; Dafnis Prieto – Absolute Quintet; Diego Urcola, Edward Simon, Avishai Cohen, Antonio Sánchez and Pernell Saturnino – Viva	
2008	Paquito D'Rivera Quintet?	Funk Tango	Bobby Sanabria Big Band – Big Band Urban Folktales; Sammy Figueroa and His Latin Jazz Explosion – The Magician; Steve Khan – Borrowed Time; Héctor Martignon – Refugee	
2009	Arturo O'Farrill and the Afro-Latin Jazz Orchestra	Song for Chico	Caribbean Jazz Project – Afro Bop Alliance; Conrad Herwig and the Latin Side Band – The Latin Side of Wayne Shorter; Nestor Torres – Nouveau Latino; Papo Vázquez and The Mighty Pirates – Marooned/Aislado	
2010	Bebo Valdés and Chucho Valdés	Juntos Para Siempre	Chembo Corniel – Things I Wanted to Do; Geoffrey Keezer – Áurea; Claudio Roditi – Brazilliance X 4; Miguel Zenón – Esta Plena	
2011	Chucho Valdés and the Afro-Cuban Messengers	Chucho's Steps	Pablo Aslan – Tango Grill; Hector Martignon – Second Chance; Poncho Sánchez – Psychedelic Blues; Wayne Wallace Latin Jazz Quintet – ¡Bien Bien!	
2013	Clare Fischer Latin Jazz Big Band	Ritmo!	Bobby Sanabria Big Band – Multiverse; Chano Dominguez – Flamenco Sketches; Manuel Valera New Cuban Express – New Cuban Express; Luciana Souza – Duos III	
2014	Paquito D'Rivera and Trio Corrente	Song for Maura	Buika – La Noche Más Larga; Roberto Fonseca – Yo; Omar Sosa – Eggun; Wayne Wallace Latin Jazz Quartet – Latin Jazz – Jazz Latin	
2015	Arturo O'Farrill and the Afro Latin Jazz Orchestra	The Offense of the Drum	Conrad Herwig ft. Joe Lovano – The Latin Side of Joe Henderson; Pedrito Martinez Group – The Pedrito Martinez Group; Emilio Solla and La Inestable de Brooklyn – Second Half; Yosvany Terry – New Throned King	
2016	Eliane Elias	Made in Brazil	Rodriguez Brothers – Impromptu; Gonzalo Rubalcaba – Suite Caminos; Wayne Wallace Latin Jazz Quintet – Intercambio; Miguel Zenón – Identities Are Changeable	
2017	Chucho Valdés	Tribute to Irakere: Live in Marciac	Andy González – Entre Colegas; Brian Lynch/Various Artists – Madera Latino: A Latin Jazz Perspective on the Music of Woody Shaw; Michael Spiro/Wayne Wallace/La Orquesta Sinfonietta – Canto América; Trio da Paz – 30	
2018	Pablo Ziegler Trio	Jazz Tango	Antonio Adolfo – Hybrido – From Rio to Wayne Shorter; Jane Bunnett & Maqueque – Oddara; Anat Cohen & Marcello Goncalves – Outra Coisa – The Music of Moacir Santos; Miguel Zenón – Típico	
2019	Dafnis Prieto Big Band	Back to the Sunset	Eddie Daniels – Heart of Brazil; Bobby Sanabria Multiverse Big Band – West Side Story Reimagined; Elio Villafranca – Cinque; Miguel Zenón featuring Spektral Quartet – Yo Soy La Tradición	
2020	Chick Corea & the Spanish Heart Band	Antidote	Thalma de Freitas with Victor Goncalves, John Patitucci, Chico Pinheiro, Rogerio Boccato and Duduka da Fonseca – Sorte! Music by John Finbury; Jazz at Lincoln Center Orchestra with Wynton Marsalis featuring Rubén Blades – Una Noche con Rubén Blades; David Sánchez – Carib; Miguel Zenón – Sonero: The Music of Ismael Rivera	
2021	Arturo O'Farrill & the Afro Latin Jazz Orchestra	Four Questions	Afro Peruvian Jazz Orchestra – Tradiciones; Chico Pinheiro – City of Dreams; Gonzalo Rubalcaba & Aymée Nuviola – Viento y Tiempo – Live at Blue Note Tokyo; Poncho Sánchez – Trane's Delight	
2022	Eliane Elias with Chick Corea & Chucho Valdés	Mirror Mirror	Carlos Henriquez – The South Bronx Story; Arturo O'Farrill & the Afro Latin Jazz Orchestra – Virtual Birdland; Dafnis Prieto Sextet – Transparency; Miguel Zenón & Luis Perdomo – El Arte Del Bolero	
2023	Arturo O'Farrill & the Afro Latin Jazz Orchestra ft. the Congra Patria Son Jarocho Collective	Fandango at the Wall in New York	Danilo Pérez featuring the Global Messengers – Crisálida; Flora Purim – If You Will; Arturo Sandoval – Rhythm & Soul; Miguel Zenón – Música de las Américas	
2024	Miguel Zenón & Luis Perdomo	El Arte del Bolero Vol. 2	Eliane Elias – Quietude; Ivan Lins & The Tbilisi Symphony Orchestra – My Heart Speaks; Bobby Sanabria Multiverse Big Band – Vox Humana; Luciana Souza & Trio Corrente – Cometa	
2025	Luques Curtis, Zaccai Curtis, Willie Martinez, Camilo Molina & Reinaldo de Jesus	Cubop Lives!	Michel Camilo & Tomatito – Spain Forever Again; Hamilton de Holanda & Gonzalo Rubalcaba – COLLAB; Eliane Elias – Time And Again; Horacio "El Negro" Hernández, John Beasley, & José Gola – El Trio: Live in Italy; Chucho Valdés & Royal Quartet – Cuba and Beyond; Donald Vega featuring Lewis Nash, John Patitucci, & Luisito Quintero – As I Travel	
2026	Gonzalo Rubalcaba, Yainer Horta & Joey Calveiro	A Tribute to Benny Moré and Nat King Cole	Paquito D'Rivera & Madrid-New York Connection Band – La Fleur de Cayenne; Pedrito Martinez, Daymé Arocena, Jon Faddis, Donald Harrison & Melvis Santa – The Original Influencers: Dizzy, Chano & Chico Arturo O'Farrill & The Afro Latin Jazz Orchestra; Arturo O'Farrill & The Afro Latin Jazz Orchestra – Mundoagua – Celebrating Carla Bley; Miguel Zenón Quartet – Vanguardia Subterránea: Live at The Village Vanguard	
2027	Winner TBA on 7 February 2027		Melissa Aldana - Filin; Eliane Elias - Ao Vivo (Live); Carlos Henriquez ft. Gonzalo Rubalcaba, Pedrito Martinez, Anthony Almonte, Osmany Paredes, Jeremy Bosch & Robert Rodriguez - Monk Con Clave; Gonzalo Rubalcaba - Gonzalo Plays Pino; Miguel Zenón & Luis Perdomo - El Arte del Bolero Vol. 3	

^{^[I]} Each year is linked to the article about the Grammy Awards held that year.

== See also ==
- Afro-Cuban jazz
- Billboard Latin Music Award for Latin Jazz Album of the Year
- Latin Grammy Award for Best Latin Jazz/Jazz Album
- List of Grammy Award categories
- Tango (dance)
