= Jorge López Ruiz =

Argentine musical artist

- Born: 1 April 1935; La Plata, Argentina
- Died: 11 December 2018 (aged 83) Buenos Aires, Argentina
- Genres: Jazz
- Occupations: Musician, composer, arranger
- Instruments: Double bass, cello, piano
- Years active: 1961–2018

Jorge López Ruiz (1 April 1935 – 11 December 2018) was an Argentine jazz double bassist, cellist, pianist, composer and arranger.

== Biography ==
López Ruiz was born in La Plata. His younger brother was guitarist, arranger and composer Oscar López Ruiz. After starting out on trumpet, he soon switched to double bass. In 1961 he released B.A. Jazz, his first album as leader, with a quintet featuring Gato Barbieri. On the recommendation of Astor Piazzolla, he studied harmony and composition for Alberto Ginastera in the mid-60's. In 1967 El grito was released, an orchestral jazz suite with López Ruiz as composer and arranger. Between 1967 and 1970, he was a musical director for CBS in Argentina, working with a number of successful Argentine pop artists, such as Sandro and Leonardo Favio. In 1968, he was part of pianist Enrique "Mono" Villegas' trio, together with drummer Osvaldo López.

In the early 70's, López Ruiz formed a free jazz quartet together with saxophonist Horacio "Chivo" Borraro. In 1971 he released the album Bronca Buenos Aires, where Borraro among others played. Both El grito and Bronca Buenos Aires were identified as reflecting a spirit of rebellion in face of the civil-military dictatorships that governed Argentina following the 1966 Argentine Revolution. As a consequence, both albums were subsequently banned and pulled from the shelves. López Ruiz's two following albums, De prepo (1972) and Viejas raices (1975), were influenced by jazz fusion. In 1978 he composed Un hombre de Buenos Aires for the city's 400th anniversary, featuring Dino Saluzzi on bandoneon, Pablo Ziegler on piano, Andrés Boiarsky on soprano saxophone, and Donna Caroll on vocals, among others.

After the 1976 coup d'état and the subsequent military dictatorship, López Ruiz left Buenos Aires and emigrated to the United States. There, he released the album Encuentro en New York in 1978, which featured musicians such as Eddie Gómez (double bass), Anthony Jackson (electric bass), Ray Barretto (percussion) and Lew Soloff (trumpet), among others. López Ruiz returned to Argentina in 1990, and continued to record several albums and perform.

In 2015, Bronca Buenos Aires was performed in its entirety, conducted by Jorge López Ruiz's son, Pablo López Ruiz. The same year, he received a Konex Award in honor of his career. He died in Buenos Aires in December 2018, aged 83.

== Discography ==
=== As leader ===
- B.A. Jazz (VIK, 1961)
- Interpreta a JLR (Trova, 1966)
- El grito (CBS, 1967)
- Folklore, ¿por qué no? (CBS, 1970)
- Bronca Buenos Aires (Trova, 1971)
- De prepo (Ten/Ballop, 1972)
- Viejas raices (EMI, 1975)
- Un hombre de Buenos Aires (Trova, 1978)
- Encuentro en New York (Chango, 1980)
- Contrabajismos (ATC, 1988)
- Espacios (Music Hall, 1990)
- Coincidencias (Redondel, 1994)
