= Héctor del Curto =

Argentine musician

- Born: Buenos Aires

Héctor del Curto is an Argentine tango bandoneon player. Born in Buenos Aires, he began to study tango music at a young age, winning the Best Bandoneon under 25 when only 17 years old. Following that honour, he played with the late tango giants Ástor Piazzolla and Osvaldo Pugliese among many others. During this time, he played at the Kennedy Center and Carnegie Hall.

In 2012, he performed with Lara St. John, Andrew Roitstein, Claudio Ragazzi and Pablo Ziegler to celebrate the 25th Anniversary of Astor Piazzolla’s 1987 Concert on the Naumburg Orchestral Concerts, in the Naumburg Bandshell, Central Park, in the summer series.

== Awards ==
In 2018 he won the Grammy Award for Best Latin Jazz Album for the album Jazz Tango as a member of the Pablo Ziegler Trio.

== Personal life ==
He currently resides in New York City where he founded the Eternal Tango orchestra and quartet.
