= Juntos Para Siempre =

Juntos Para Siempre may refer to:

- Juntos Para Siempre (Los Mismos album), 1995
- Juntos Para Siempre (Bebo Valdés and Chucho Valdés album), 2009
