= Joey Calveiro =

- Joey Calveiro in 2026

Background information
- Born: March 27, 2007 (age 19); Miami, Florida, U.S.
- Genre: Jazz
- Occupation: Musician
- Instrument: Saxophone
- Years active: 2024–present
- Website: joeycalveiro.com

Joey Calveiro (born March 27, 2007) is an American jazz saxophonist . He won the Grammy Award for Best Latin Jazz Album in 2026 for A Tribute to Benny Moré and Nat King Cole. At age 18, he became the youngest winner in the history of the category.

== Career ==
Calveiro began studying music as a child and started playing saxophone at age 12. He attended Miami Arts Charter School, where he studied jazz.

In 2024, he released his debut album, Among the Stars, which featured musicians including Chucho Valdés, Arturo Sandoval, Gonzalo Rubalcaba and Yainer Horta. That year, he was featured by Rolling Stone en Español in its Artistas que debes conocer series.

In 2025, while attending Miami Dade College, Calveiro recorded A Tribute to Benny Moré and Nat King Cole with Gonzalo Rubalcaba and Yainer Horta. The album was nominated for Best Latin Jazz Album at the 68th Annual Grammy Awards. Calveiro was 18 at the time of the nomination, making him the youngest nominee in the category since its creation.

The album won Best Latin Jazz Album at the 68th Annual Grammy Awards in 2026, earning Calveiro his first Grammy Award. At age 18, he became the youngest winner in the history of the category. Guinness World Records recognizes him as the youngest nominee and youngest winner in the Best Latin Jazz Album category.

== Discography ==
- Among the Stars (2024)
- A Tribute to Benny Moré and Nat King Cole (with Gonzalo Rubalcaba and Yainer Horta) (2025)

== Awards and recognition ==
- Grammy Award for Best Latin Jazz Album, 2026
- Latin Grammy Award nomination for Best Instrumental Album, 2026
- Guinness World Record, youngest Grammy nominee in the Best Latin Jazz Album category
- Guinness World Record, youngest Grammy winner in the Best Latin Jazz Album category
