= The Gathering (Caribbean Jazz Project album) =

Studio album by Caribbean Jazz Project
- Released: June 11, 2002
- Genre: Jazz
- Label: Concord Jazz

Caribbean Jazz Project chronology
Paraiso (2001)	The Gathering (2002)	Birds of a Feather (2003)

The Gathering is the title of a studio album released by the Caribbean Jazz Project on June 11, 2002. Dave Samuels, Dave Valentin and Paquito D'Rivera are the main performers on the album, which was awarded with a Grammy Award for Best Latin Jazz Album.

== Track listing ==
The track listing from Allmusic.

No.	Title	Writer(s)	Length
1.	"Rendezvous"	Dave Samuels	5:22
2.	"Stolen Moments"	Oliver Nelson	7:27
3.	"See You in a Minute"	Dave Valentin	4:53
4.	"The Gathering"	Samuels	5:54
5.	"Bemsha Swing"	Denzil Best, Thelonious Monk	7:38
6.	"Libertad"	Ruben Rodriguez	4:51
7.	"El Guarachero Intrigozo (The Scheming Party Animal)"	Dafnis Prieto	5:36
8.	"The Path"	Samuels	5:49
9.	"Masacoteando (In the Groove)"	Prieto, Richie Flores	3:04

== Chart performance ==
Chart (2002)	Peak position
US Billboard Top Jazz Albums	21
