= Oscar López Ruiz =

Argentinian guitarist, composer, arranger, and record producer (1938–2021)

- Born: 21 March 1938; La Plata, Argentina
- Died: 24 December 2021 (aged 83); Buenos Aires, Argentina
- Occupation(s): guitarist, composer and producer

Oscar López Ruiz (21 March 1938 – 24 December 2021) was an Argentine guitarist, composer, arranger and record producer.

== Life and career ==
Born in La Plata, López Ruiz studied guitar with Antonio Sinópoli and León Vicente Gascónade, making his official professional debut in 1954, playing electric guitar in the Tony-Armand Orchestra. After having been part of the ensemble Los Cinco Latinos, in 1961 he joined the Astor Piazzolla ensemble Quinteto Nuevo Tango (in which he replaced Horacio Malvicino), and later was part of other Piazzolla's ensembles such as Conjunto 9 and the Octeto Astor Piazzolla. He was partnered for 54 years of the singer Donna Caroll, with whom he often collaborated on stage and in recordings. His collaborations also include Gato Barbieri, Oscar Alemán, Dino Saluzzi, Eladia Blázquez, Lalo Schifrin, Leopoldo Federico, Sergio Mihanovich.

López Ruiz composed several soundtracks for films, plays and revues, and between 1967 and 1969 was director of the jazz label Trova, with whom he produced albums of Piazzolla, Mono Villegas and Horacio Ferrer, among others. He died at the age of 83 of sepsis. His brother Jorge López Ruiz was a double bass player, a composer and an arranger.
