= Dafnis Prieto =

American drummer

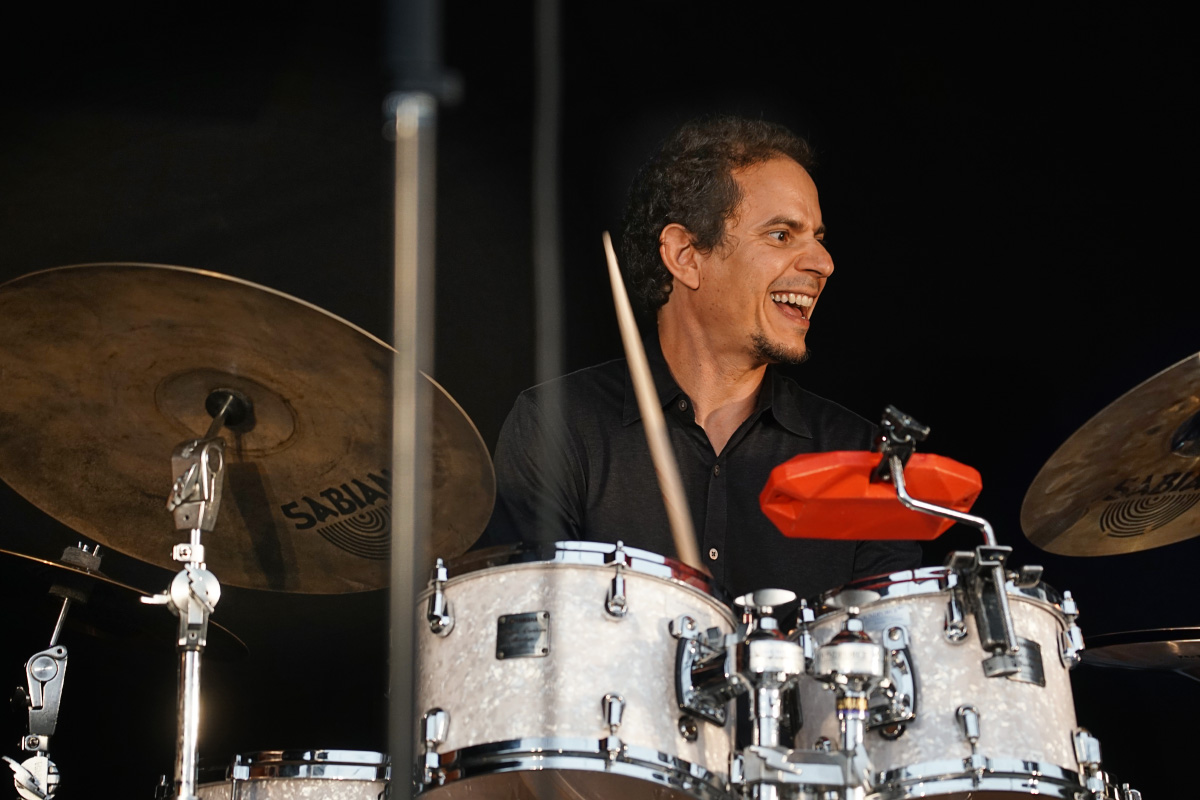
- Prieto at Aarhus Jazz Festival; Denmark 2019

Background information
- Born: July 31, 1974 (age 51); Santa Clara, Cuba
- Genres: Jazz, Latin jazz, Afro-Cuban jazz
- Occupations: Musician, composer, bandleader, educator
- Instrument: Drums
- Years active: 1993–present
- Labels: Zoho, Dafnison Music
- Website: dafnisonmusic.com

Dafnis Prieto (born July 31, 1974) is a Cuban-American drummer, composer, bandleader, and educator.

== Career ==
In his home town of Santa Clara, Cuba, Prieto studied percussion and guitar. During his teens, he moved to Havana to study at the National School of Music. He concentrated on classical music and Afro-Cuban music before paying more attention to jazz. In 1999, when he was twenty-five, Prieto moved to New York City, where he worked with Eddie Palmieri, Carlos Barbosa-Lima, Arturo O'Farrill, Dave Samuels, and Michel Camilo, among many others.

Prieto has conducted master classes, clinics, and workshops. From 2005 to 2015, he was a member of the music faculty at New York University. Since 2015, he has taught at the Frost School of Music at the University of Miami in Miami, Florida.

== Awards and honors ==
- 2007 Grammy nomination, Best Latin Jazz Album, Dafnis Prieto Absolute Quintet (Zoho Music)
- 2007 Latin Grammy nomination, Best New Artist
- 2011 MacArthur Fellow
- 2018 Latin Grammy nomination, Best Latin Jazz Album, Back to the Sunset
- 2018 Grammy Award, Best Latin Jazz Album, Back to the Sunset
- 2021 Grammy nomination, Best Latin Jazz Album, Transparency

== Discography ==
=== As leader ===
- About the Monks (Zoho, 2004)
- Absolute Quintet (Zoho, 2006)
- Taking the Soul for a Walk (Dafnison, 2008)
- Live at Jazz Standard NYC (Dafnison, 2009)
- Proverb Trio (Dafnison, 2012)
- Triangles and Circles (Dafnison, 2015)
- Back to the Sunset (Dafnison, 2018)
- Transparency (Dafnison, 2020)
- Cantar (Dafnison, 2022)
- 3 Sides of the Coin (Dafnison, 2024)

=== As sideman ===
With Caribbean Jazz Project

- The Gathering (Concord Picante, 2002)
- Birds of a Feather (Concord Picante, 2003)
- Mosaic (Concord Picante, 2006)

With others

- Peter Apfelbaum, It Is Written (ACT, 2005)
- Concha Buika, La Noche Más Larga (Warner Music Spain, 2013)
- Jane Bunnett, Ritmo + Soul (Blue Note, 2000)
- Michel Camilo, Spirit of the Moment (Telarc, 2007)
- Steve Coleman, Lucidarium (Label Bleu, 2004)
- Matt Dusk, Two Shots (Decca, 2004)
- Kip Hanrahan, Beautiful Scars (American Clave, 2008)
- Paquito Hechavarria, Frankly (Calle 54,)
- Brian Hughes, One 2 One (Higher Octave, 1998)
- D. D. Jackson, Sigame (Justin Time, 2001)
- D. D. Jackson, Suite for New York (Justin Time, 2003)
- Ronny Jordan, London Lowdown (Blue Note, 2001)
- Nino Josele, Espanola (DRO, 2009)
- Brian Lynch, Spheres of Influence Suite (2006)
- Brian Lynch/Eddie Palmieri, Simpatico (ArtistShare, 2006)
- Carlos Maza, Zapato Kiko (Owl, 1994)
- Arturo O'Farrill, Live in Brooklyn (Zoho, 2005)
- Eddie Palmieri, La Perfecta II (Concord, 2002)
- Henry Threadgill, Everybodys Mouth's a Book (Pi, 2001)
- Henry Threadgill, Up Popped the Two Lips (Pi, 2001)
- Yerba Buena, Follow Me (Wrasse, 2007)
- John Zorn, Voices in the Wilderness (Tzadik, 2003)

Recorded by others

- 2001: "B. Smooth" recorded by John Benítez Trio, Descarga in New York (Khaeon)
- 2002: "El Guarachero Intrigozo (The Scheming Party Animal)" and "Masacoteando (In the Groove)" recorded by Caribbean Jazz Project, The Gathering (Concord Picante)
- 2003: "Against the Law" recorded by Caribbean Jazz Project, Birds of a Feather (Concord Picante)
- 2008: "Echo-dimensions" recorded by Meridian Arts Ensemble, Timbrando (Channel Classics)
- 2008: "Song for Chico" recorded by Arturo O'Farrill & the Afro Latin Jazz Orchestra, Song for Chico (Zoho)
- 2008: "The Guiros Talk" and "Claveteando" recorded by Ethos Percussion Group, Building (Bribie )
- 2008: "Vida Sin Miel" recorded by Arturo O'Farrill & Claudia Acuña, In These Shoes (Zoho)
- 2009: "Trail of Memories" recorded by Jon Nelson, Fable (8bells)
- 2015: "The Triumphant Journey" recorded by Arturo O'Farrill & the Afro Latin Jazz Orchestra, Cuba: The Conversation Continues (Motéma)

== Books ==
- 2016: A World of Rhythmic Possibilities: Drumming Lessons and Reflections on Rhythms. Dafnison Music. ISBN 978-0-692-65526-9.
- 2020: Rhythmic Synchronicity. Individual and Collective Rhythmic Skills: A Rhythm Course for Non-Drummers. Dafnison Music. ISBN 978-0-578-56244-5.
- 2025: What Are The Odds: A Journey on Latin Rhythms and Meters. Dafnison Music. ISBN 979-8-896-92637-5.

== See also ==
- Music of Cuba
- Music of New York City
