= Antonio Agri =

Argentine violinist, composer and conductor

Personal details
- Born: May 5, 1932 Rosario, Santa Fe
- Died: October 17, 1998 (aged 66) Buenos Aires

Antonio Agri (May 5, 1932 – October 17, 1998) was an Argentine violinist, composer and conductor prominent in both the tango and classical music genres.

== Life and work ==
Antonio Agri was born in Rosario, Argentina, in 1932. He was taught music locally by Dermidio Guastavino, and in 1947, he made his professional debut in Córdoba as member of a quartet. Later, in Rosario, he joined orchestras led by Julián Chera, Lincoln Garrot and José Sala. He later joined a quartet, Los poetas del Tango, and eventually led a string quintet, the Quinteto de Arcos Torres/Agri.

He later joined the Rosario Symphony Orchestra, though in 1961, Nito Farace (a violinist in the Aníbal Troilo Orchestra for decades) recommended him to Ástor Piazzolla. Piazzolla invited Agri to take part in the Quinteto Nuevo Tango, and the debut took place in April 1962. Agri later played in the Nuevo Octeto (1963), and played as sideman in well-known orchestras headed by Osvaldo Fresedo, Horacio Salgán, Mariano Mores, Alberto Caracciolo and Roberto Pansera. Piazzolla made Agri the lead violin in his 1968 musical, María de Buenos Aires, and the two continued their association in 1971 as part of the Conjunto 9, recording for RCA Records. Agri toured with the Conjunto internationally, though he left to accept a commission as a company violinist in the prestigious Teatro Colón opera house, in Buenos Aires (Agri later admitted regretting this move).

He formed his own string ensemble (violins, violas, cellos and double bass), in 1973. His Mosalini/Agri Quintet, based in Paris and co-directed by Juan José Mosalini, also featured Agri's son, Pablo, with whom the violinist often performed as a duo. He later co-founded the Nuevo Quinteto Real with pianist Horacio Salgán, bandoneonist Leopoldo Federico (later replaced by Néstor Marconi), guitarist Ubaldo De Lío, and bassists Omar Murtagh and Oscar Giunta. Among their best known albums was the 1975 anthology of the work of bandoneonist Aníbal Troilo, Suite Troileana.

Agri recorded as featured guest soloist with the Royal Philharmonic Orchestra and in Paris with flamenco guitarist Paco de Lucía, during the 1990s. The prolific volume of Agri's performances include solos in Retrato de Alfredo Gobbi, Ciudad triste, Los mareados, Éxtasis, Romance del diablo, Otoño porteño, and probably the best-known, in Piazzolla's intenseMilonga del ángel. He recorded Kokoró Kará ("From the Inside," in Japanese) with José Carli, and a compilation of his works, Antonio Agri: Tango Sinfónico, in 1997. The album included his numbers, Carambón and Sin pretención de nada ("With No Pretense at All").

The diminutive violinist was invited to take part in world-renowned cellist Yo-Yo Ma's dedication to Ástor Piazzolla, Soul of the Tango, in 1997. Following the album's recording, Agri joined the famous cellist on his promotional tour for the album. Agri's health, however, forced him to return to Buenos Aires. He was featured in Carlos Saura's Tango, and shortly after its premiere, Agri lost a battle with cancer on October 17, 1998, at age 66.

Soul of the Tango earned the 1999 Grammy Award for Best Classical Crossover Album, and Antonio Agri was honored posthumously.

Music critic Julio Nudler of the Buenos Aires daily Pagina/12 reflected that "Connoisseurs enjoy the profound tango flavor that he achieved hitting the violin with his bow, and if they had ever seen him playing, could listen to his records and picture his challenging posture, his chest sticking out and his feet firmly on the dais."

Agri, for his part, summarized his career by his belief that "The violin chose me. Because of that I’m a musician. Besides, as Atahualpa Yupanqui said “there are people who dazzle and there are others who illuminate” –and I don’t want to dazzle."
