= Bobby Sanabria =

American Latin Jazz musician (born 1957)

- Born: June 2, 1957 (age 69); South Bronx, New York City, U.S.
- Genres: Jazz, Latin jazz, Afro-Cuban jazz, Brazilian jazz, World music
- Occupations: Musician, composer, arranger, producer, educator, writer
- Instruments: Drums, percussion
- Website: www.bobbysanabria.com

Bobby Sanabria (born June 2, 1957) is an American drummer, percussionist, composer, arranger, documentary film producer, educator, activist, radio show host, and writer of Puerto Rican descent who specializes in jazz and Latin jazz.

== Biography ==
Sanabria was born in the South Bronx in New York City on June 2, 1957, of Puerto Rican descent being raised in the Melrose Housing Projects in the Melrose section of the borough. He graduated from the Berklee College of Music in 1979 with his Bachelor of Music degree in both jazz drum set and classical percussion, minoring in arranging and composition receiving the Faculty Association Award for his excellence as a player and student. He has appeared over the years all over the world teaching about and performing Latin jazz. He has written articles for Modern Drummer, DRUM, DownBeat, Traps, and is a regular contributor to the WBGO website and written liner notes for over 50 CD releases. He has been featured in DownBeat, The New York Times, New York Daily News, Modern Drummer, Drum, Percussion, NPR,. and NPR Latino USA.

His albums Afro-Cuban Dream: Live and in Clave, Big Band Urban Folktales, Multiverse, West Side Story Reimagined, and Vox Humana have all been nominated for a Grammy Award for Best Latin Jazz Album. West Side Story Reimagined also won the Jazz Journalists Award for Best Jazz Album of 2019. They have been critically praised for their forward thinking vision in expanding the boundaries of the Latin jazz big band tradition. His release with his Multiverse Big Band, Vox Humana featuring vocalists Janis Siegel, Antoinette Montague, Jennifer Jade Ledesna and Oreste Abrantes recorded live at Dizzy's, NYC, was nominated for a 2024 Grammy for Best Latin Jazz recording.

(Mr. Sanabria) expands the possibilities, moving the sounds of bands like that of (Puente, Machito), with all the heft and intricacy and clave-based dance rhythm, into the harmonically oriented sophistication of current New York jazz players. It's New York up and down, and back and forth across the last century, from the streets to the mambo palaces to the conservatories. – Ben Ratliff, The New York Times (June 25, 2007)

The Wall Street Journal reviewer Will Friedwald wrote, "There's every reason to hope that Steven Spielberg's remake of West Side Story will improve upon the 1961 film, but I doubt if we'll ever hear a more thrilling interpretation of that immortal score than that of the Bobby Sanabria Multiverse Big Band."

Known as a drummer, percussionist, composer, arranger, conductor, documentary film producer, educator, activist, and bandleader, Bobby Sanabria's versatility as both a drummer and percussionist, from small group to big band, has become legendary. A native son of the South Bronx born to Puerto Rican parents, Bobby has performed and recorded with every major figure in the world of Latin jazz and salsa, from the founder of the Afro-Cuban/Latin jazz movement Mario Bauzá, to Tito Puente, Mongo Santamaría, Dizzy Gillespie, Chico O'Farrill, Ray Barretto, Candido, to Larry Harlow, Ruben Blades, Celia Cruz, and jazz luminaries as diverse as Henry Threadgill, Charles McPherson, Randy Brecker, Joe Chambers, Jean Lucien, The Mills Brothers, and others. DRUM! Magazine named him Percussionist of the Year (2005); he was named Percussionist of the Year by the Jazz Journalists Association in 2011 and 2013. In 2006 he was inducted into the Bronx Walk of Fame. A street plaque bearing his name is now on permanent display on the Grand Concourse, the most famous thoroughfare in the Bronx.

He was a recipient of the 2018 Jazz Education Network (JEN) LeJENS of Jazz Lifetime Achievement Award for his work as a musician and educator. In 2008 Congressman Dennis Kucinich honored his work as a musician and educator by reading his name into the Congressional Record and in 2018 the U.S. Congressional Black Caucus honored him as a musician, educator. Every single one of his big band recordings, seven in total, have been nominated for Grammys. His 2018 recording, West Side Story Reimagined, reached #1 on the national Jazz Week radio charts, was nominated for a 2018 Grammy, and won the prestigious 2019 Record of The Year Award from the Jazz Journalists Association. Partial proceeds from sales of this double CD set went to the Jazz Foundation of America's Puerto Rico Hurricane Relief Fund for musicians . Mr. Sanabria has composed the music for several award-winning, critically acclaimed documentaries - From Mambo to Hip Hip: A South Bronx Tale (2006) where he was also a producer, consultant and on air personality, Some Girls (2017), and La Madrina: The Savage Life of Loraine Padilla (2020). Other documentaries he has been featured in on screen and acted as a consultant, producer are, The Palladium: Where Mambo Was King (2003), Latin Music U.S.A. (2006), We Like It Like That: The Story of Latin Boogaloo (2015), and Let's Get The Rhythm 2016). In 2019 he was named Godfather/Padrino of the National Puerto Rican Day Parade in New York City. He is the Co-Artistic Director of the Bronx Music Heritage Center and the Bronx Music Hall. His lifetime dedication to spreading the history, culture, of jazz and Latin jazz to the general public as a performer, as well as educating a new generation of players, composers, arrangers, has no parallel. A member of Max Roach's legendary M'BOOM percussion ensemble, he is on the faculty of the New School (his 29th year) and NYU and was on the faculty of the Manhattan School of Music for 20 years. He is also the on air host of the Latin Jazz Cruise on WBGO FM and wbgo.org, the number one jazz station in the nation where he also is a frequently featured writer on the website.

Maestro Sanabria was honored by Lehman College by being bestowed an Honorary Doctorate in Music.

He endorses TAMA drums, Sabian cymbals, Latin Percussion Inc. instruments, Remo drum heads, and Vic Firth sticks and mallets

== Discography ==
=== As leader ===
Denotes Grammy nomination ***

- 1993 - ¡New York City Ache! w/ special guests Tito Puente and Paquito D'Rivera NAIRD Album of The Year 1993
- 2000 - Afro-Cuban Dream: Live and in Clave!!! (Arabesque) Grammy nominated ***
- 2002 - Bobby Sanabria & ¡Quarteto Aché! (Zoho Music)
- 2003 - 50 Years of Mambo: A Tribute to Damaso Perez Prado recorded live at Town Hall, NYC (Mambo Maniacs) Latin Grammy nominated ***
- 2007 - 2007 - El Espiritu Jibaro - Roswell Rudd, Yomo Toro with Bobby Sanabria & Ascensión
- 2007 - Big Band Urban Folktales (Jazzheads) Grammy nominated ***
- 2009 - Kenya Revisited Live!!! Bobby Sanabria conducts the Manhattan School of Music Afro-Cuban Jazz Orchestra w/ special guest Candido recorded live at Borden Auditorium MSM (Jazzheads) Latin Grammy nominated ***
- 2011 - Tito Puente Masterworks Live!!! Bobby Sanabria conducts the Manhattan School of Music Afro-Cuban Jazz Orchestra recorded live at Borden Auditorium MSM (Jazzheads) Latin Grammy nominated ***
- 2012 - Multiverse Bobby Sanabria Big Band (Jazzheads) DOUBLE Grammy nominated ***
- 2014 - ¡Que Viva Harlem! Bobby Sanabria conducts the Manhattan School of Music Afro-Cuban Jazz Orchestra (Jazzheads) recorded live at Borden Auditorium MSM
- 2018 - West Side Story Reimagined Bobby Sanabria Multiverse Big Band (Jazzheads) recorded live at Dizzy's, NYC Grammy nominated, Jazz Journalists Association Album of The Year ***
- 2023 - Vox Humana (Jazzheads) Grammy nominated, Bobby Sanabria Multiverse Big Band featuring Janis Siegel, Antoinette Montague, Jennifer Jade Ledesna recorded live at Dizzy's, NYC ***
- 2026 - Arsenio and Beyond: Live at the Bronx Music Hall (Jazzheads), Bobby Sanabria Multiverse Big Band

=== As sideman ===
- Mongo Santamaria, Mongo Magic, 1983
- Mongo Santamaria, Espiritu Libre, 1984
- Luis Perico Ortiz - Breaking The Rules, 1987
- Yomo Toro - Gracias, 1990
- Mario Bauzá Afro-Cuban Jazz Orchestra, Tanga Suite, 1991
- The Mambo Kings Soundtrack, 1991
- Mario Bauzá Afro-Cuban Jazz Orchestra – My Time is Now, 1992
- Paquito D'Rivera and the United Nations Orchestra, A Night in Englewood, 1993
- Mario Bauzá Afro-Cuban Jazz Orchestra, 944 Columbus, 1993
- Carola Grey, The Age Of Illusions, 1994
- Spider Saloff, Sextet, 1995
- Michael Philip Mossman, Spring Dance, 1995
- Jorge Sylvester, Musicollage, 1996
- Daniel Schnyder, Tarantula, 1996
- Sekou Sundiata, The Blue Oneness of Dreams, 1997
- Frank London, Debt, 1997
- Cuba: I Am Time, 1997
- Michael Philip Mossman, Mama Soho, 1998
- Ford Montreux Detroit Jazz Festival. 1998
- Charles McPherson, Manhattan Nocturne, 1998
- Men with Guns (Hombres Armados) Soundtrack, 1998
- Larry Harlow, Larry Harlow's Latin Legends Band, 1998
- Klaus Suonsaari - Something In Common (1998)
- John Fedchock, On the Edge, 1998
- William Cepeda, Afrorican Jazz... My Roots and Beyond, 1998
- Mario Bauzá, Messidor's Finest, 1998
- Jerome Van Rossum Diplomatic Immunity, 1998
- Viento De Agua, De Puerto Rico Al Mundo, 1998
- Chris Washburne & The SYOTOS Band, Nuyorican Nights, 1998
- Cuba, I Am Time, Vol. 4: Cubano Jazz, 1999
- Jorge Sylvester, In the Ear of the Beholder, 2000
- Ray Barretto, Portraits In Jazz & Clave, 2000
- Sekou Sundiata, Long Story Short, 2000
- Eugenia León, Acercate Mas, 2000
- Ray Barretto & New World Spirit, Trancedance, 2001
- Chris Washburne & The SYOTOS Band, The Other Side 2001
- Donato Póveda, Bohemio Enamorado 2002
- Hilary Noble, Noble Savage, 2002
- Joe Chambers, Urban Grooves, 2002
- David Gonzalez, City of Dreams, 2002
- NewYorkestra Big Band Urban Soundscapes, 2002
- John Fedchock New York Big Band, No Nonsense, 2002
- Larry Harlow & His Latin Jazz Encounter, Live at Birdland, 2002
- Chris Washburne & The SYTOS Band, Paradise In Trouble 2003
- John Fedchock New York Big Band, No Nonsense 2003
- Joe Chambers, Urban Grooves, 2003
- Lou Caputo, Urban Still Life, 2003
- Ray Barretto & New World Spirit, Time Was, Time Is, 2005
- Joe Chambers, The Outlaw, 2006
- Chris Washburne & The SYOTOS Band, The Land of Nod, 2006
- Charles McPherson, Manhattan Nocturne, 2006
- Roswell Rudd & Yomo Toro featuring Bobby Sanabria & Ascensión, El Espíritu Jíbaro, 2007
- Cándido, Hands of Fire, 2007
- John Fedchock New York Big Band, Up And Running, 2007
- Arturo O'Farrill & Friends Play The Music of Eugene Marlow, A Wonderful Discovery, 2007
- Inza Bama, House Of Bamba, 2008
- Sooz, I Wanna Iguana, 2010
- Gabriele Tranchina, A Song of Love's Color, 2010
- Eugene Marlow, Celebrations: The Heritage Ensemble Interprets Festive Melodies from the Hebraic Songbook, 2010
- Eugene Marlow, A Fresh Take, 2011
- Eugene Marlow, Hitz & Pizz: A Rhythm Extravaganza, 2011
- Susan Goodman Jackson, Live Out Loud, 2012
- Chris Washburne & The SYOTOS Band, Land of Nod, 2013
- Ben Lapidus, Ochosi Blues, 2014
- Eugene Marlow, Mosaica, 2014
- Art Lillard's Heavenly Big Band, Certain Relationships, 2015
- Eugene Marlow, Changes, 2015
- Max Pollack, Rumba Tap, 2015
- John Fedchock New York Big Band, Like It Is, 2015
- Eli Fountain, Percussion Discussion, Masterpiece, 2015
- Pucci Amanda Jhones, Love Jones, 2015
- In Their Own Voice, Vol. V: Eugene Marlow & The Heritage Ensemble feat. Jennifer Jade Ledesna, Amelie Cherubin, Shira Shira Lissek
- Eugene Marlow, A Night So Silent Night, 2016
- Eugene Marlow, Obrigado Brasil, 2016
- Eugene Marlow, Blue In Green, Original Compositions by Eugene Marlow inspired by The Jazz Poems of Grace Schulman, 2019
- The Afro-Caribbean Artistry of Bobby Sanabria & Matthew Gonzalez, 2019
- David Child's, Child's Play, 2020
- Rie Akagi, La Flauta Magica, 2020
- Gabriela Anders, Los Dukes, A Latina Tribute To Duke Ellington, 2021
- Mary LaRose, Out There, 2021
- Eugenie Jones, Players, 2022
- The Manhattan Transfer, 50, 2022
- Ray Blue, #PEOPLE, 2023
- David Lopatao, Short Stories, 2024
- Joe Gonzalez & The San Juan Experience, Life is Grand!, 2025
- Tim Session, Retrospect, 2026
- Sam Baum, My Shiny Imagination, 2026
- Janis Siegel, The Art of Vocalese, 2026

=== Film, Video, Radio, TV ===
- Los Olvidados “The Forgotten Ones" - An Audio Documentary On Pan-Latin Jazz featuring Bobby Sanabria, Jane Bunnett, Michele Rosewoman, John Santos, and more - 2022
- On air host/producer, The Latin Jazz Cruise Radio Show, writer for website WBGO FM - 2019-present
- The Palladium Where Mambo Was King - associate producer, on screen personality (Kaufman Films, BRAVO 2002)
- Robert Klein: The Amorous Busboy of Decatur Avenue, on screen musician on percussion (HBO, 2005)
- Modern Drummer Festival, Bobby Sanabria in concert with his ensemble Ascensión with additional interview segment (Hudson Music 2006)
- From Mambo To Hip Hop - A South Bronx Tale - associate producer, on screen personality, composer of soundtrack (Citylore, PBS 2006)
- Latin Music U.S.A. - assistant producer, on screen personality (PBS 2009)
- We Like It That - The Story of Latin Boogaloo - on screen personality (Citylore, 2015)
- Let's Get The Rhythm - on screen personality (Citylore, 2016)
- Some Girls - composer of soundtrack (Cepeda Films, 2017)
- The Marvelous Mrs. Mazel - The Disappointment of the Dionne Quintuplets - Year 1, Episode 4 - bandleader at the Copacabana (2017)
- La Madrina - The Savage Life of Lorine Padilla - composer of soundtrack (Cepeda Films, 2020)
- Playing The Conga and Tumbao Part 1 - Jazz at Lincoln Center Jazz Academy video - 2014
- Playing The Conga and Tumbao Part 2 - Jazz at Lincoln Center Jazz Academy video - 2014
- Playing The Conga and Tumbao Part 3 - Jazz at Lincoln Center Jazz Academy video - 2014
- Playing The Conga and Tumbao Part 4 - Jazz at Lincoln Center Jazz Academy video - 2014
- How To Play The Bongo - Part 1 - Jazz at Lincoln Center Academy video – 2015
- How To Play The Bongo - Part 2 - Jazz at Lincoln Center Academy video – 2015
- How to Play The Guiro - Jazz at Lincoln Center Jazz Academy video – 201
- The Rhythms of Soca on Drumset - Jazz at Lincoln Center Jazz Academy video – 2017
- The Rhythms of Merengue on Drumset - Jazz at Lincoln Center Jazz Academy video – 2017
- The Rhythms of Joropo on Drumset - Jazz at Lincoln Center Jazz Academy video – 2017
- The Rhythms of Baião on Drumset - Jazz at Lincoln Center Jazz Academy video – 2017
- Performance Spotlight: Bobby Sanabria on drums - Vic Firth Sticks - 2015
- Game Changing Moment: Bobby Sanabria on air interview - Vic Firth Sticks – 2014
- We Like It Like That: The Story of Latin Boogaloo - documentary - historical consultant, on air personality - PBS TV - 2014
- First International Day of Jazz, Bobby Sanabria & Quareteto Aché - PBS TV – 2013
- LP Basics - Bobby Sanabria - Mambo - instructional video, LP Inc. - 2013
- LP Basics - Bobby Sanabria - Cha-Cha-Cha - instructional video, LP Inc. - 2013
- LP Basics - Bobby Sanabria - Danzón - instructional video. LP Inc.- 2013
- LP Basics - Bobby Sanabria - Son Montuno - instructional video, LP Inc. - 2013
- LP Basics - Bobby Sanabria - Bolero - LP Inc. - instructional video, LP, inc. – 2013
- LP Basics - Bobby Sanabria - Bembé - LP Inc. - instructional video, LP, inc. – 2013 -
- Vivimos, Bacardi Rum 150th Anniversary Limited Run TV Commercial Series, 2012 - drums, percussion, arranger, contractor
- Latin Music U.S.A - PBS TV Episodes 1 and 2 - associate producer, on air personality, historical consultant – 2009
- From Mambo To Hip Hop - A South Bronx Tale - PBS TV - associate producer, on air personality, historical consultant, composer of soundtrack – 2006
- Modern Drummer Festival - Bobby Sanabria & Ascensión - Hudson Music- 2006 - concert video
- The Palladium: Where Mambo Was King - Bravo TV Network - associate producer, on air personality, historical consultant – 2003
- Burger King commercial (onscreen played congas) - 2000
- Getting Started On Congas - Fundamento 2: Technique For Two and Three Drums w/ Booklet featuring Candido, DCI – Bilingual -1996
- Getting Started on Conga, DCI Fundamento 1: Technique For One and Two Drums - Bilingual - 1996
- Getting Started on Congas - Congas Basics - Bilingual - 1996
- Heatwave – Mongo Santamaria documentary - on screen performer on drums and timables, interviewee, PBS TV – 1985
- Rivkin: Bounty Hunter – on screen performer on drums - CBS TV Movie – 1981

=== Endorsements ===
TAMA Drums, Sabian Cymbals, Latin Percussion Inc., Remo Drumheads, Vic Firth Sticks
