= Jazz Tango =

Studio album by Pablo Ziegler
- Released: June 9, 2017
- Recorded: 2015
- Genre: Jazz, Latin jazz, Tango
- Length: 1:00:56
- Label: ZOHO Music
- Producer: Pablo Ziegler, Kabir Sehgal; Joachim Becker (Exec. producer)

Pablo Ziegler chronology
Tango Nuevo (2016)	Jazz Tango (2017)

Professional ratings
Review scores
Source	Rating
All About Jazz	4.5/5 stars

Jazz Tango, is a studio album by Argentine pianist, composer, and arranger Pablo Ziegler. The album won Ziegler the 2018 Grammy Award for Best Latin Jazz Album, his second Grammy.

== Track listing ==
1. Michelangelo 70 (Astor Piazzolla) 5:01
2. La Fundición (Pablo Ziegler) 6:24
3. Milonga Del Adiós (Ziegler) 9:25
4. Buenos Aires Report (Ziegler) 5:01
5. Blues Porteño (Ziegler) 7:40
6. Fuga Y Misterio (Piazzolla) 5:16
7. Elegante Canyenguito (Ziegler) 5:52
8. La Rayuela (Ziegler) 5:31
9. Muchacha De Boedo (Ziegler) 9:11
10. Libertango (Piazzolla) 8:23

== Personnel ==
- Pablo Ziegler – Piano, arranger, composer, producer
- Hector del Curto – Bandoneon
- Claudio Ragazzi – Guitar
- Kabir Sehgal – Producer
- Joachim Becker – Executive producer
- Oscar Zambrano – Recording, mixing & mastering engineer
