= Conjunto 9 =

Argentine tango ensemble

Conjunto 9 (a.k.a. Noneto) was a tango ensemble set up by Ástor Piazzolla which was active between 1971 and 1972.

The short-lived ensemble was based on Piazzolla’s first Quinteto, comprising Astor Piazzolla (bandoneon), Osvaldo Manzi (later Osvaldo Tarantino (piano), Antonio Agri (violin), Oscar López Ruiz (electric guitar) and Kicho Díaz (double bass). To this he added a quartet comprising Hugo Baralis (2nd violin), Néstor Panik (viola), José Bragato (cello) and José Corriale (percussion).

For many musicologists this was the ensemble in which Piazzolla reached the zenith of his musical career. Thanks to the presence of a string quartet within the formation, Piazzolla was able to evolve a more complex contrapuntal language, to which was added the rhythmical improvisations of the piano, guitar and percussion, providing a language close to that of cool jazz and rock, a tendency which would become more accentuated in the later European stage of Piazzolla’s career.

The Noneto recorded the albums Música popular contemporánea de la Ciudad de Buenos Aires, Vol. 1 y 2, published in 1971 and 1972, respectively. There are also recordings of them accompanying the singers Amelita Baltar and Mina, and of the music from Bernardo Bertolucci’s film Last Tango in Paris. Some of this music was not used in the film due to its late completion by Piazzolla, who was busy preparing for his first concert at the Teatro Colón in Buenos Aires in 1972. Bertolucci employed Gato Barbieri to complete the music and that part of Piazzolla’s music that was completed late was used for Francesco Rosi’s film Cadáveri eccelenti in 1976.

In 1972 Piazzolla composed the three movement Concierto de Nácar, for the Conjunto 9 and orchestra, one of his most complex compositions which incorporated various techniques of contemporary music composition, such as polyrhythm and polytonality.

Within a year of its formation the Conjunto 9 had run into financial problems and was dissolved in 1972.

Piazzolla re-formed the Conjunto 9 in 1983, with some changes in its formation, for his second concert at the Teatro Colón on 11 June where they played together with the Buenos Aires Philharmonic, conducted by Pedro Ignacio Calderón. The programme included his Concerto for bandoneon and orquestra and Concierto de Nácar. This time the Noneto was made up of: Astor Piazzolla (bandoneon), Pablo Ziegler (piano), Fernando Suárez Paz, (violin), Oscar López Ruiz (electric guitar) and Héctor Console (double bass) plus Hugo Baralis (2nd violin), Delmar Quarleri (viola), José Bragato (cello) and Enrique Roizner (percussion).

== Discography ==
- Música Popular Contemporánea de la Ciudad de Buenos Aires, vol. 1, (1971)
- Música Popular Contemporánea de la Ciudad de Buenos Aires, vol. 2, (1972)
- El gordo triste, a recording of Amelita Baltar, who is accompanied by the Noneto in the tango Los paraguas de Buenos Aires, (1972)
- Roma 1972, recording of a concert on 10 April 1972 in the Instituto Ítalo Estadounidense in Rome (1994).
- Signori...: Mina!, recording of a concert in April 1972 in the Teatro 10 in Rome where Mina sang Balada para mi muerte accompanied by Conjunto 9 (1972).
- Astor Piazzolla y su Conjunto 9, recording which contains the compositions Jeanne et Paul and El penúltimo for the film Last tango in Paris (1972).
- Astor Piazzolla en el Teatro Colón, recording of a concert on 11 June 1983.
