= Eugenie Jones =

American jazz vocalist

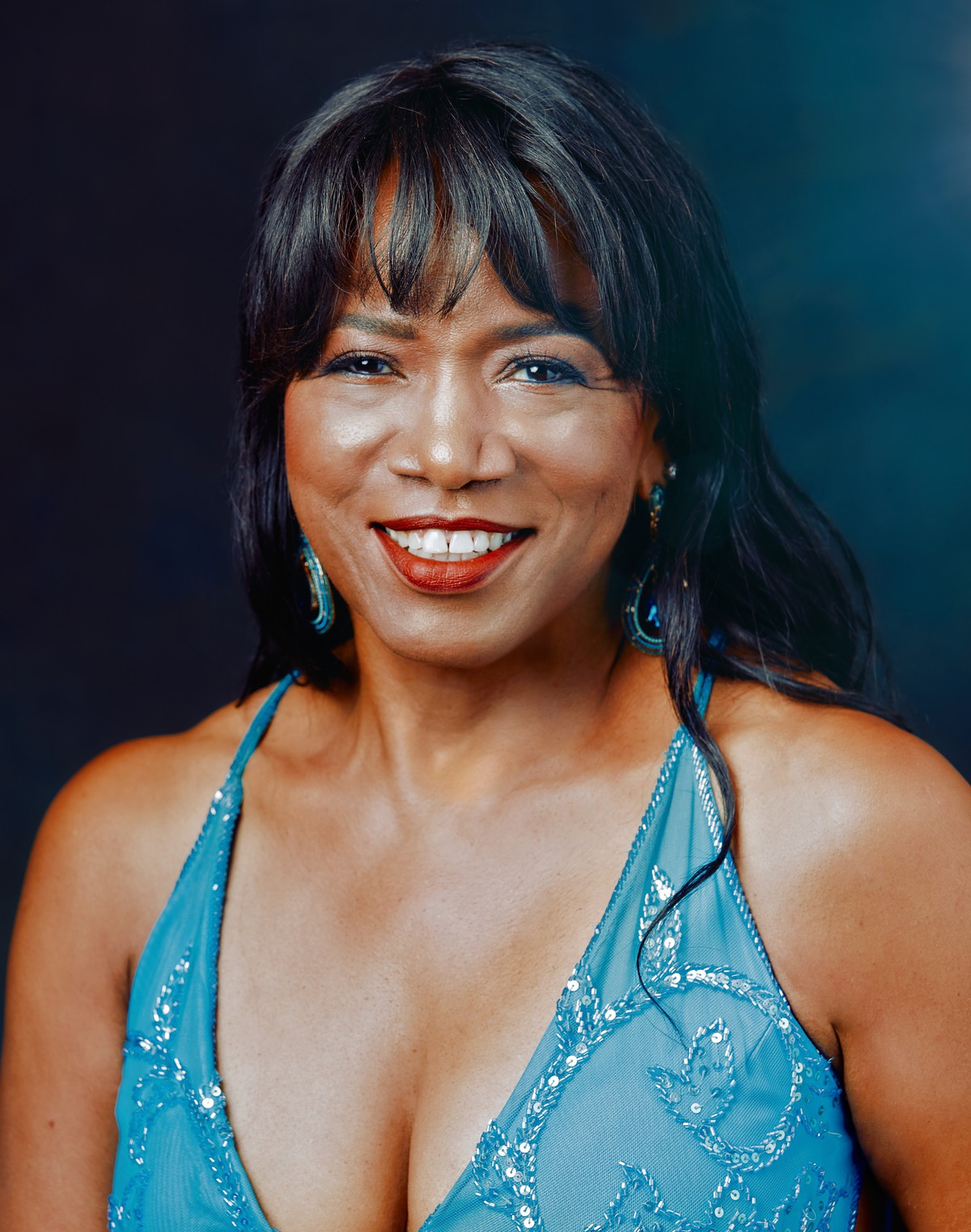
- Born: Eugenie Kay Parker; Morgantown, West Virginia
- Occupations: Jazz singer, songwriter, producer
- Website: www.eugeniejones.com

Eugenie Jones is an American jazz vocalist, songwriter, and producer. She has collaborated with many jazz artists, including Reggie Workman, Bernard Purdie, Julian Priester, Bobby Sanabria, Lynn Seaton, Marquis Hill, Bill Anschell, and Lonnie Plaxico. She received the Jazz Hero Award by the Jazz Journalist Association in 2023.

Jones wrote original straight-ahead, swing, and soul-infused jazz lyrics and melodies.

Her recordings include four independently produced albums recorded on her label, Open Mic Records, including Black Lace Blue Tears (2013), Come Out Swingin' (2015), Players (2022), The Originals (2023), and the single One More Night to Burn.

== Early life and education ==
She was born to Eugene & Tommie Lee Parker in Morgantown, West Virginia. Her parents were members of the choir at Friendship Baptist Church.

Eugenie was the couple's middle child, growing up with five sisters and three brothers. Early music influences came from listening to her parents' favorite Ray Charles and Nancy Wilson LPs, her older sibling's Motown records, her parents singing in church, and her mother perpetually singing around the house.

After completing her MBA, she married and relocated to the Pacific NW, started a family and a career in marketing communications and the death of her mother, in 2010, Jones started singing by leading her church congregation in songs, and later met Bernie Jacobs, who invited her to Seattle vocal jams. She relocated to Seattle, WA, and started a family and a career in marketing communications.

== Career ==
Jones discovered her musical abilities in 2010 after losing her mother to cancer. Jones was inspired to start singing to carry on the part of her mother, and pursuing that quest led her into the Seattle jazz scene. Jones booked her first performance in 2011 at Eagan's Ballard Jam House in Seattle, WA.

In 2013, she released her debut album, Black Lace Blue Tears. The recording contained nine of her original songs and two jazz standards, and the release was awarded the Earshot Jazz NW Recording of the Year Golden Ear Award. Her 2015 follow-up album, Come Out Swingin', also received critical acclaim, and earned her the title of NW Vocalist of the Year from Earshot.

In 2022, Jones released her third album, Players. The two-disc, 15-track album consisting mostly of original tunes was recorded over four years in four different cities – New York, Dallas, Chicago, and Seattle – with many musicians, including Delvon Lamarr, Reggie Workman, Julian Priester, Bobby Sanabria, and Lonnie Plaxico.

Jones launched her nonprofit, Music for a Cause in 2018.

Under the Music for a Cause umbrella, in 2018 Jones assumed the role of executive producer of the Jackson Street Jazz Walk, in 2021 co-produced the Celebrating Ernestine Anderson Tribute Series with Crusaders’ Stix Hooper, and in 2022 served as the executive producer of the Dear Ernestine Tribute series.

In 2023, in recognition of her jazz-intersected community service efforts, the Jazz Journalists Association (JJA) awarded Jones with the JJA Jazz Hero award.

== Personal life ==
She was born to parents Eugene & Tommie Lee Parker. Eugenie was the couple's middle child, growing up with five sisters and three brothers.

== Discography ==
=== As lead artist / producer ===
- Come Out Swingin' (2015)
- Players (2022)
- The Originals (2023)
- One More Night to Burn (single; 2022)

=== Compilation recordings ===
- 10th Jackson Street Jazz Walk Compilation (2023)

== Awards ==
- Earshot Jazz Golden Ear Award – Recording of the Year (2013)
- Earshot Jazz Golden Ear Award – Vocalist of the Year (2015)
- Jazz Hero Award – Jazz Journalist Association (2023)
