= Juntos Para Siempre (Bebo Valdés and Chucho Valdés album) =

Studio album by Bebo Valdés and Chucho Valdés
- Released: November 11, 2008
- Recorded: June 26–27, 2007
- Genre: Latin jazz, bolero, descarga, son
- Label: Sony Music Latin
- Producer: Nat Chediak, Fernando Trueba

Bebo Valdés chronology
Live at the Village Vanguard (2007)	Juntos Para Siempre (2008)	Chico and Rita (2011)

Chucho Valdés chronology
Chucho Valdés y su Combo: Cuban Jazz Revolution (2008)	Juntos para siempre (2008)	Chucho's Steps (2010)

Juntos para siempre ("Together Forever") a 2008 studio album by Cuban pianists Bebo Valdés and Chucho Valdés. The album was recorded as a piano duet, father and son recording together for the first time in almost 50 years. Each played on a different piano, Chucho being recorded on the left channel and Bebo on the right. The recordings, made in Madrid in two sessions in 2007, were produced by Nat Chediak and Fernando Trueba and consist mostly of Latin standards, including Bebo's own compositions such as "Rareza del siglo", his first hit. Commenting on the long hiatus which kept Bebo away from his family, he stated that he thought that he would never see his son again, but when finally they had the opportunity to be together and record it, it was a "reward for all those years of uncertainty."

The album was well-received by critics, winning the Grammy Award for Best Latin Jazz Album at the 52nd Grammy Awards in 2010, as well as the Latin Grammy Award in the same category.

== Track listing ==
The track listing from AllMusic.

No.	Title	Writer(s)	Length
1.	"Preludio para Bebo"	Bebo Valdés	5:06
2.	"Descarga Valdés"	Bebo Valdés, Chucho Valdés	4:52
3.	"Tres palabras"	Osvaldo Farrés	4:45
4.	"Rareza del siglo"	Bebo Valdés	4:13
5.	"Tea for Two"	Vincent Youmans	5:06
6.	"Son de la loma"	Miguel Matamoros	3:31
7.	"La gloria eres tú"	José Antonio Méndez	3:48
8.	"A Chucho"	Bebo Valdés	4:55
9.	"Sabor a mí"	Álvaro Carrillo	5:31
10.	"Perdido"	Juan Tizol	3:14
11.	"Lágrimas negras"	Miguel Matamoros	3:46
12.	"La conga del dentista"	Óscar Valdés	3:21
