= Live at the Village Vanguard (Chucho Valdés album) =

Live album by Chucho Valdés
- Released: April 11, 2000
- Recorded: April 9–10, 1999
- Length: 63:23
- Label: Blue Note

Live at the Village Vanguard is an album by Chucho Valdés, released through Blue Note Records in 2000. In 2001, the album won Valdés the Grammy Award for Best Latin Jazz Album.

== Track listing ==
1. "Anabis" (Valdés) – 9:44
2. "Son XXI (Para Pia)" (Ubieta) – 5:27
3. "Punto Cubano" (Valdés) – 6:18
4. "My Funny Valentine" (Lorenz Hart, Richard Rodgers) – 5:37
5. "To Bud Powell" (Valdés) – 10:45
6. "Drume Negrita" (Grenet) – 5:31
7. "Como Traigo la Yuca" (Rodriquez) – 6:36
8. "Ponle la Clave" (Valdés) – 9:36
9. "Encore-Lorraine's Habanera" (Valdés) – 3:49

== Personnel ==
- Roberto Vizcaino Guillot - batá drums, congas
- Francisco Rubio Pampin - bass
- Raúl Píñeda Roque - drums
- Chucho Valdés - piano
- Mayra Caridad Valdés - vocals
