= Chucho's Steps =

2010 studio album by Chucho Valdés

Studio album by Chucho Valdés
- Released: August 31, 2010
- Recorded: November 23, 2009 – November 30, 2009
- Studios: Abdala studio, Havana, Cuba
- Genre: Jazz
- Length: 65:57
- Label: Four-Quarters
- Producer: Chucho Valdés

Chucho Valdés chronology
New Conceptions (2003)	Chucho's Steps (2010)

Chucho's Steps is an album by jazz pianist Chucho Valdés and his band, the Afro-Cuban Messengers. The album was released in 2010 by Four-Quarters Entertainment and was produced by Valdés, who also composed all of the music. It won the 2011 Grammy Award for Best Latin Jazz Album.

Some of the tracks were written in honor of Joe Zawinul, "Zawinul's Mambo", and the Marsalis family, "New Orleans". In addition to his regular sidemen, Valdés employed additional musicians, including singer/percussionist Dreiser Durruthy Bombale.

== Overview ==
I love this album, it is a sample of the new work we are doing, the new artistic combinations of Afro-Cuban music and jazz. It is a tribute to many musicians and the audience and reviewers have responded very well to it.

— Chucho Valdés

Chucho's Steps is Valdés's first solo album since 2003's New Conceptions. Recorded at Abdala studio the acoustic album incorporates jazz, bebop, swing and Afro-Cuban ritual music.

In February 2011 Chucho's Steps won the Grammy Award for Best Latin Jazz Album.

== The band ==
Valdés expanded his band, the Afro-Cuban Messengers, the name a reference to Art Blakey's Jazz Messengers, from a trio to a sextet for this recording. In addition to his regular sidemen, percussionist Yaroldy Abreu Robles, bassist Lazaro Rivero Alarcón, and drummer Juan Carlos De Castro "Rojo" Blanco, are a horn section, trumpeter Reynaldo Melián Álvarez and saxophonist Carlos Miyares Hernández, and singer/percussionist Dreiser Durruthy Bombale.

== Selected tracks ==
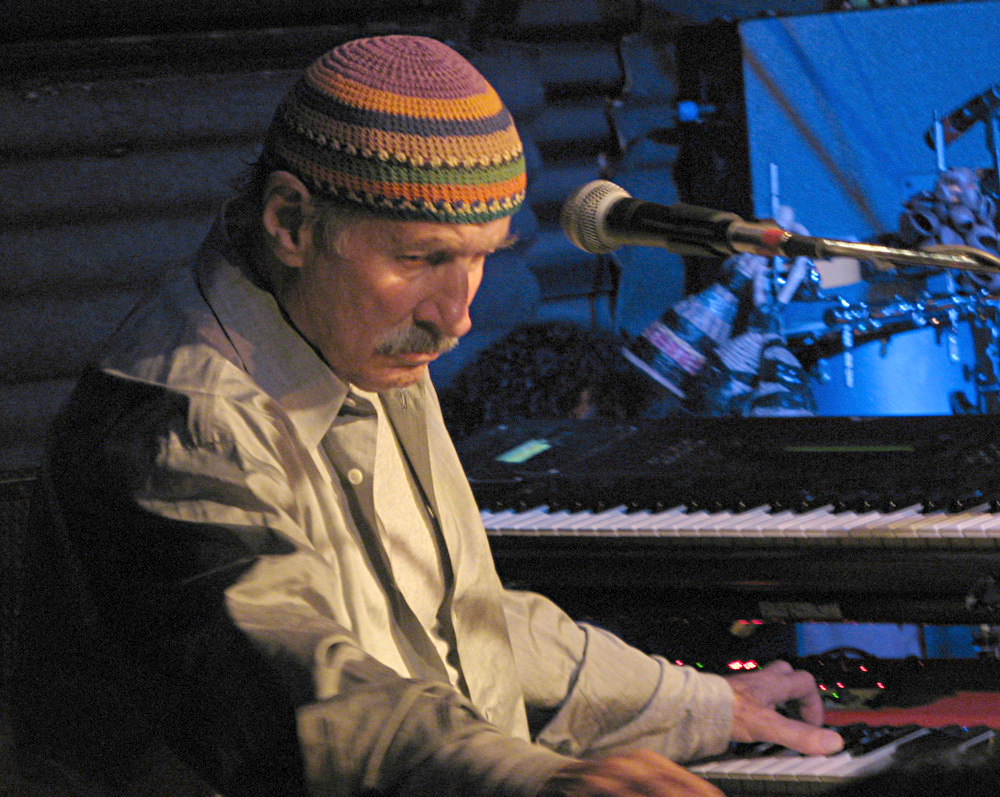
"Zawinul's Mambo" is dedicated to the late Joe Zawinul

The album's opening track, "Zawinul's Mambo", is dedicated to Austrian keyboardist Joe Zawinul. Valdés, who had been playing the piece as early as 2007, thought that Zawinul had died before ever hearing it, but in 2010 a Zawinul interview surfaced that contained him hearing a recording of the piece from a jazz festival in Marciac. The track "Begin to Be Good" is a nod to Cole Porter's "Begin the Beguine" and George Gershwin's "Lady Be Good". American musicals were a part of Valdés's childhood, and "Begin the Beguine" became a favorite song of his.

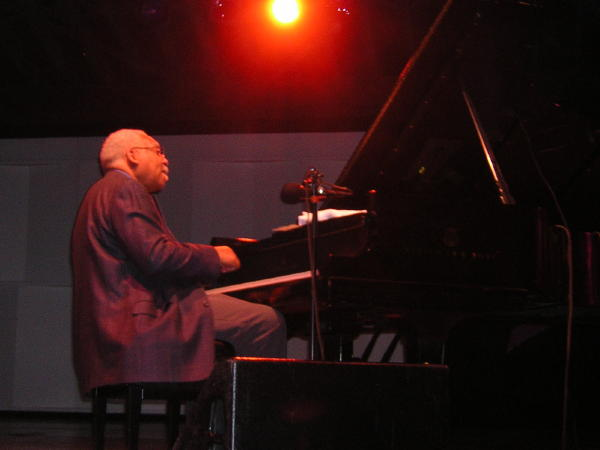
Ellis Marsalis, patriarch of the Marsalis family

The track "New Orleans" is a homage to the musical Marsalis family. Valdés's relationship with, Ellis Marsalis, the Marsalis patriarch goes back to 1979. In October 2010 Wynton Marsalis travelled to Havana for a week-long series of shows with an aim of easing Cuba – United States relations.

"Yansa" was inspired by the Yoruba religion, specifically a call to the deity Orisha, the track is highlighted by the vocals of Dreiser Durruthy Bombale. "Julian" is an ode to Valdés 3-year-old son. The title track, "Chucho's Steps", references John Coltrane's composition "Giant Steps".

== Reception ==
Reviews of Chucho's Steps were positive. All About Jazz reviewer Jerry D'Souza called the album "another master work from the genius of Chucho Valdés". In Howard Reich's review in the Deseret News he called Valdés a "virtuoso of the highest order".

Professional ratings
Chucho's Steps
Review scores
Source	Rating
Allmusic	4/5 stars

In The Washington Post Mike Joyce called the album a "keyboard tour de force" In Jeff Simon's review in The Buffalo News he singled out the performances of drummer Juan Carlos De Castro "Rojo" Blanco and saxophonist Carlos Miyares Hernández, calling them "impressive players anywhere".

Rebeca Mauleón in JazzTimes called the album "almost as good as seeing [Valdés] live". LA Weekly's Brick Wahl called the album "exceptional", Valdés's playing "revelatory" and the band "just great". William Ruhlmann of Allmusic call the album a "versatile set demonstrating [Valdés's] continuing vitality and invention".

== Track listing ==
All tracks written by Chucho Valdés

1. "Las dos Caras" 8:54
2. "Danzón" 9:07
3. "Zawinul's Mambo" 11:21
4. "Begin to Be Good" 5:12
5. "New Orleans" 4:42
6. "Yansá" 7:49
7. "Julián" 7:52
8. "Chucho's Steps" 10:52

== Personnel ==
- Chucho Valdés – piano
- Reynaldo Melián Álvarez – trumpet
- Carlos Miyares Hernández – tenor saxophone
- Lazaro Rivero Alarcón – bass, choir
- Juan Carlos De Castro "Rojo" Blanco – drums
- Yaroldy Abreu Robles – percussion, choir
- Dreiser Durruthy Bombale – vocals, percussion
- Yemi Menocal – choir
- Baira Fermina Ramirez – choir

=== Production ===
- Lorena Salcedo – executive producer
- Rita Rosa – production assistant
- Estrabao Verdecia – production assistant
- Orestes Avila – engineer, mastering, mixing
- Rebeca Alderete Bauta – assistant engineer
- Amed Fernández Martínez – assistant engineer
- Victor Cicard – mastering
- Leonardo Acosta – liner notes
- Alejandro Pérez – artwork, design, photography
- Pedro Vazquez – artwork, design

== Charts ==
Chart (2010)	Peak position
US Billboard Jazz Albums	21
