= Caribbean Jazz Project =

- Origin: New York City
- Genres: Latin jazz, world fusion
- Years active: 1993–2008
- Labels: Concord, Heads Up

Caribbean Jazz Project was a Latin jazz band founded in 1993. The original group featured Dave Samuels, Paquito D'Rivera, and Andy Narell. After their second album, D'Rivera and Narell left the group, although both returned as guest stars. Under Samuels' leadership, the group explored different genres of latin jazz with a changing membership and numerous guest artists. The band released nine albums under the Caribbean Jazz Project name and one as the featured backing band for jazz singer Diane Schuur. The final album with Samuels, Afro Bop Alliance, featured the Maryland-based Afro Bop Alliance Big Band led by drummer Joe McCarthy and won the 2008 Latin Grammy Award for Best Latin Jazz Album. McCarthy's latin jazz big band continues to record under its own name, and Samuels retains the group's name.

== Discography ==
- The Caribbean Jazz Project (Heads Up, 1995)
- Island Stories with Paquito D'Rivera (Heads Up, 1997)
- New Horizons (Concord Picante, 2000)
- Paraiso with Dave Samuels, Dave Valentin, Steve Khan (Concord, 2001)
- The Gathering (Concord Picante, 2002)
- Birds of a Feather with Dave Samuels (Concord Picante, 2003)
- Schuur Fire, Diane Schuur with Caribbean Jazz Project (Concord Picante 2005)
- Here and Now: Live in Concert (Concord 2005)
- Mosaic with Dave Samuels (Concord Picante, 2006)
- Afro Bop Alliance with Dave Samuels (Heads Up, 2008)

== Members ==
Sources:

- Oscar Feldman - alto and soprano saxophone
- Andy Axelrad – alto saxophone
- John Benitez – bass
- Randy Brecker – trumpet
- Café – percussion
- Caridad Canelon – backing vocals
- Oscar Castro-Neves – guitar
- Luis Conte – congas, bongos, timbales, percussion
- Nick Cooper – trumpet
- Dan Drew – trombone
- Dario Eskenazi – piano
- Richie Flores – congas, bongos, shakere
- Luis Hernandez – tenor saxophone
- Conrad Herwig – trombone
- Rob Holmes – baritone saxophone
- Christian Howes – violin
- Steve Khan – guitar
- Boris Kozlov – bass
- Romero Lubambo – guitar
- Alain Mallet – piano, organ
- Joe McCarthy – drums
- Jim McFalls – trombone
- Mark Morgan – trombone
- Max Murray – bass
- Andy Narell – steel pans
- Vince Norman – tenor saxophone
- Ben Patterson – trombone
- Dafnis Prieto – timbales, drums
- Luisito Quintero – timbales, percussion
- Paquito D'Rivera – alto saxophone, clarinet
- Ruben Rodriguez – bass
- Poncho Sanchez – congas
- Dave Samuels – marimba, vibraphone
- Pernell Saturnino – congas, percussion
- Oscar Stagnaro – bass
- Tim Stanley – trumpet
- Diego Urcola – trumpet, flugelhorn
- Dave Valentin – flute
- Ray Vega – flugelhorn, trumpet
- Robert Vilera – timbales, percussion
- Mark Walker – drums
- Chris Walter – trumpet
- Steve Williams – alto saxophone
- Alon Yavnai – piano
