= Bele Bele en la Habana =

Studio album by Chucho Valdés
- Released: 1998
- Label: Blue Note
- Producer: Réne López

Chucho Valdés chronology
Solo Piano (1991)	Bele Bele en la Habana (1998)	Briyumba Palo Congo (1999)

Bele Bele en la Habana is an album by the Cuban pianist Chucho Valdés, released in 1998. Valdés supported the album with a North American tour.

The album peaked at No. 22 on Billboard's Jazz Albums chart. It was nominated for a Grammy Award for "Best Latin Jazz Performance".

== Production ==
The album was produced by Réne López. It was recorded in Toronto, with Valdés leading a trio. "Con Poco Coco" was written by Bebo Valdés, Chucho's father. "Los Caminos" was written by Pablo Milanés. "Lorraine" is dedicated to the owner of the Village Vanguard. "But Not For Me" is a cover of the Gershwin song. "Son Montuno" was written by Valdés in the 1960s.

== Critical reception ==
Professional ratings
Review scores
Source	Rating
AllMusic	4.5/5 stars
The Encyclopedia of Popular Music	4/5 stars
Los Angeles Daily News	3.5/4 stars
Los Angeles Times	3.5/4 stars
MusicHound World: The Essential Album Guide	5/5 stars

The Philadelphia Inquirer noted that several pieces "contain references to the suitelike Cuban danzon and the agitated high-speed-chase lines associated with Dizzy Gillespie's bebop-era Afro-Cuban hybrid." The Los Angeles Times stated that "the music ranges from a son to a mambo, from a danzon to a guaguanco."

The Hartford Courant thought that Valdés's piano "sounds like a giant modern orchestra powered by a dynamo percussion section." The Globe and Mail opined that Valdés's "playing is impressive enough in its power and technical facility, but his showy improvisations have an off-handed glibness that leaves them less than compelling and sometimes even less than fully coherent."

AllMusic wrote that "Valdés more often than not is all over the keyboard, comfortable with everything from Ravel-ian classical complexity to Bill Evans' introspection to Cecil Taylor-like crunches."

== Track listing ==
No.	Title	Length
1.	"Son Montuno"
2.	"Lorraine"
3.	"But Not for Me"
4.	"Con Poco Coco"
5.	"El Cumbanchero"
6.	"Tres Lindas Cubanas"
7.	"La Sitiera"
8.	"Los Caminos"
