= Pablo Ziegler =

Argentine composer

Pablo Ziegler (born September 2, 1944) is a Grammy Awards winning Argentine composer, pianist, arranger based in New York City. He is an exponent of nuevo tango, and has worked extensively as Ástor Piazzolla's regular pianist from 1978 until Piazzolla's retirement for health reasons in 1989. During their collaboration, they performed with Milva, Placido Domingo, Gary Burton among others. He played with Piazzolla's re-formed Conjunto 9 in 1983 for his Teatro Colón concert with the Buenos Aires Philharmonic. In 1985 Ziegler composed the music for the film Adios Roberto, and in 1990, he established the New Tango Quartet.

His playing style, both sharply percussive and metallically lyrical, bears some similarities to that of Vladimir Horowitz as well as some of the wistfulness of Bill Evans. As a composer he has taken Piazzolla's contrapuntal approach to tango music and added more jazz influence, notably with the regular use of a drum kit, lighter harmonies similar to those used in bossa nova, and extended passages of improvisation. His 2003 album Bajo Cero received a Latin Grammy award.

He has worked with of classical, jazz, and Latin musicians including Emmanuel Ax, Gary Burton, Regina Carter, Branford Marsalis, Paquito D’Rivera, Kenny Garrett, Stefon Harris, Joe Lovano, Christopher O'Riley, Quique Sinesi, Walter Castro, Nestor Torres, Joe Locke, Randy Brecker, David Sánchez (musician), and Miguel Zenón.

In 2012, he performed with Lara St. John, Andrew Roitstein, Claudio Ragazzi and Hector Del Cuerto to celebrate the 25th Anniversary of Astor Piazzolla’s 1987 Concert on the Naumburg Orchestral Concerts, in the Naumburg Bandshell, Central Park, in the summer series.

He orchestrates and collaborates with orchestras as a soloist that include BBC Proms, Orchestre National de Lyon, Orpheus Chamber Orchestra, Metropole Orkest, Sydney Symphony Orchestra, Presidential Symphony Orchestra, Seoul Philharmonic Orchestra, Slovenian Philharmonic Orchestra and the Wellington Chamber Orchestra, with whom he performed in New Zealand in June 2014.

== Awards ==
Ziegler's 2017 album, Jazz Tango won the 2018 Grammy Award for Best Latin Jazz Album.

Ziegler’s 2013 recording, the Latin Grammy-nominated Amsterdam Meets New Tango (Zoho Music 2013), saw his quartet paired with the Netherlands’ Metropole Orkest, playing his most famous works arranged for jazz orchestra. His work as music director, arranger and pianist for bass-baritone opera star Erwin Schrott received an Echo Klassik Award in 2011 for the album Rojotango. Ziegler’s 2003 release, Bajo Cero, won the Latin Grammy Award for Best Tango Album, and in 2008, his album Buenos Aires Report made the final list of nominees for the same award. Other major recordings include 1998’s Tango Romance with the Orpheus Chamber Orchestra and 1996’s Los Tangueros with Emanual Ax.

Pablo Ziegler is Steinway Artist and Honorary Citizen of New Orleans.

== Discography ==
=== As leader ===
- La Conexión Porteña (Sony 1991)
- Los Tangueros - The Tangos of Astor Piazzolla piano duos with Emanuel Ax (Sony 1996)
- Asfalto: Street Tango (BMG 1998)
- Tango Romance with the Orpheus Chamber Orchestra (BMG 1998)
- Quintet for New Tango (BMG 2000)
- Bajo Cero with Walter Castro and Quique Sinesi (Enja 2003)
- Tango Meets Jazz with Stefon Harris (Zoho 2007)
- Buenos Aires Report with Walter Castro and Quique Sinesi (Zoho 2007)
- Amsterdam Meets New Tango with the Metropole Orkest (Zoho 2013)
- Desperate Dance with Quique Sinesi and Walter Castro (Enja 2015)
- Tango Nuevo with Christopher O'Riley (Steinway & Sons 2016)
- Jazz Tango with Hector Del Curto and Claudio Ragazzi (Zoho 2017)
- Solo Pablo Ziegler (Steinway & Sons 2018)
- Radiotango with Pablo Ziegler Chamber Quartet (Zoho 2019)

=== As artistic director, arranger, pianist, composer ===
- La Marcha del Golazo Solitario: Los Fabulosos Cadillac
- Los Dias Perdidos: Denyce Graves
- Pura Musica Vol.2: Cacho Tirao
- The Symphonic Tango: The Royal Philharmonic
- Rojotango: Erwin Schrott (Sony Classical)
- Tango Nostalgias: Julio Botti (Zoho 2010)
- Sax to Tango with Julio Botti (Zoho 2016)

=== As sideman ===
With Ástor Piazzolla

- Astor Piazzolla Live at the Montreal Jazz Festival [DVD] (1984)
- Live in Colonia, 1984 (Intuition 2003)
- Tango: Zero Hour (American Clave 1986)
- Tristezas de un Doble A (Meesidor 1987)
- La Camorra (American Clave 1989)
- The New Tango with Gary Burton, recorded live at the 1986 Montreux Festival (Atlantic 1988)
- The Central Park Concert recorded in 1987 (Chesky 1994)
- The Vienna Concert recorded in 1984 (JVC Japan 2013)
