= Donna Caroll =

Argentine actress and singer (1938–2020)

- Born: 28 May 1938; Buenos Aires, Argentina
- Died: 31 March 2020 (aged 81); Buenos Aires, Argentina
- Occupations: singer and actress

Donna Caroll (28 May 1938 - 31 March 2020) was an Argentine jazz singer and actress.

== Life and career ==
Born Linda René Abadi in Buenos Aires, in the mid-sixties she won an audition for Canal 11 and was cast in the musical show Show 90, who gave her immediate popularity. After having strengthened her notoriety thanks to the participation to other shows and to a very popular jingle she recorded for Gancia vermouth, in 1966 she recorded her first album, Sol de medianoche. During her career she recorded songs in Spanish, English, French, Italian and Portuguese and recorded albums in France, Spain and Puerto Rico. She was also a stage actress, specialized in musical comedies. She received several awards, including the Premio Martín Fierro and the Konex Award.

After a failed marriage with an Arab businessman, she was married from 1966 until her death with the guitarist and composer Oscar López Ruiz, with whom she frequently collaborated on stage and in recordings. She died at the age of 81 of cardiac arrest.
