= Back to the Sunset =

Studio album by Dafnis Prieto
- Released: April 6, 2018
- Length: 1:15:24
- Label: Dafnison

Dafnis Prieto chronology
Triangles and Circles (2015)	Back to the Sunset (2018)

Back to the Sunset is an album by Cuban-American singer-songwriter Dafnis Prieto, released in 2018.

== Track listing ==
No.	Title	Length
1.	"Una Vez Más"	7:28
2.	"The Sooner the Better"	9:04
3.	"Out of the Bone"	9:34
4.	"Back to the Sunset"	7:29
5.	"Danzonish Potpourri"	10:11
6.	"Song for Chico"	7:28
7.	"Prelude Para Rosa"	8:04
8.	"Two For One"	9:16
9.	"The Triumphant Journey"	6:50
