= West Side Story Reimagined =

Live album by Bobby Sanabria
- Released: 2018
- Recorded: November 19, 2017
- Venue: Dizzy’s Club Coca-Cola, Manhattan
- Genre: Jazz
- Length: 1:19:38
- Label: Jazzheads

West Side Story Reimagined is an album by Bobby Sanabria, released in 2018. It was recorded live at Dizzy’s Club Coca-Cola in Manhattan. A large portion of the proceeds from the album went toward helping musicians in Puerto Rico who had been affected by Hurricane Maria.

== Reception ==
West Side Story Reimagined was nominated for a Grammy in the category of Best Latin Jazz album.

In 2019, the album won the Jazz Journalists Award for best Record of 2018.

The Wall Street Journal reviewer Will Friedwald wrote, "There's every reason to hope that Steven Spielberg's remake of West Side Story will improve upon the 1961 film, but I doubt if we'll ever hear a more thrilling interpretation of that immortal score than that of the Bobby Sanabria Multiverse Big Band."

== Track listing ==
Act 1

1. Intro – (:33)
2. Prologue – arranged by Jeremy Fletcher (7:39)
3. Intro Jet Song – (:12)
4. Jet Song – arranged by Niko Siebold (6:03)
5. Intro America – (:09)
6. America – arranged by Jeff Lederer (6:34)
7. Gee, Officer Krupke Intro – (:15)
8. Gee, Officer Krupke – arranged by Jeremy Fletcher (6:00)
9. Tonight – arranged by Matt Wong (5:49)
10. Gym Scene – Blues/Mambo – arranged by Danny Rivera
11. Gym Scene – Cha Cha Cha – arranged by Nate Sparks (4:45)

Act 2

1. Maria – arranged by Eugene Marlow, vocals/rhythm arranged by Bobby Sanabria (8:15)
2. Intro Cool – (:07)
3. Cool – arranged by Andrew Neesley (5:50)
4. The Rumble/Rumba – arranged by Takao Heisho (5:38)
5. One Hand, One Heart – arranged by Jeremy Fletcher (5:03)
6. Somewhere – arranged by Jeremy Fletcher (3:55)
7. Intro Epilogue/Finale – (1:14)
8. Epilogue/Finale – arranged by Jeremy Fletcher (2:52)
9. Outro – (2:21)
