= Chico Pinheiro (musician) =

Brazilian guitarist, composer, and arranger

Chico Pinheiro is a Brazilian guitarist, composer, and arranger. He has played with other guitarists including Anthony Wilson, Julian Lage and Steve Cardenas. He is a leading figure of modern jazz in Brazil.

His music has been well-received by critics in Brazil, and his work has featured vocalist Luciana Alves.

== Discography ==
- 2008 Nova with Anthony Wilson
- 2010 There's A Storm Inside
- 2020 CITY OF DREAMS
