= Chucho Valdés =

Cuban pianist, bandleader, composer and arranger (born 1941)

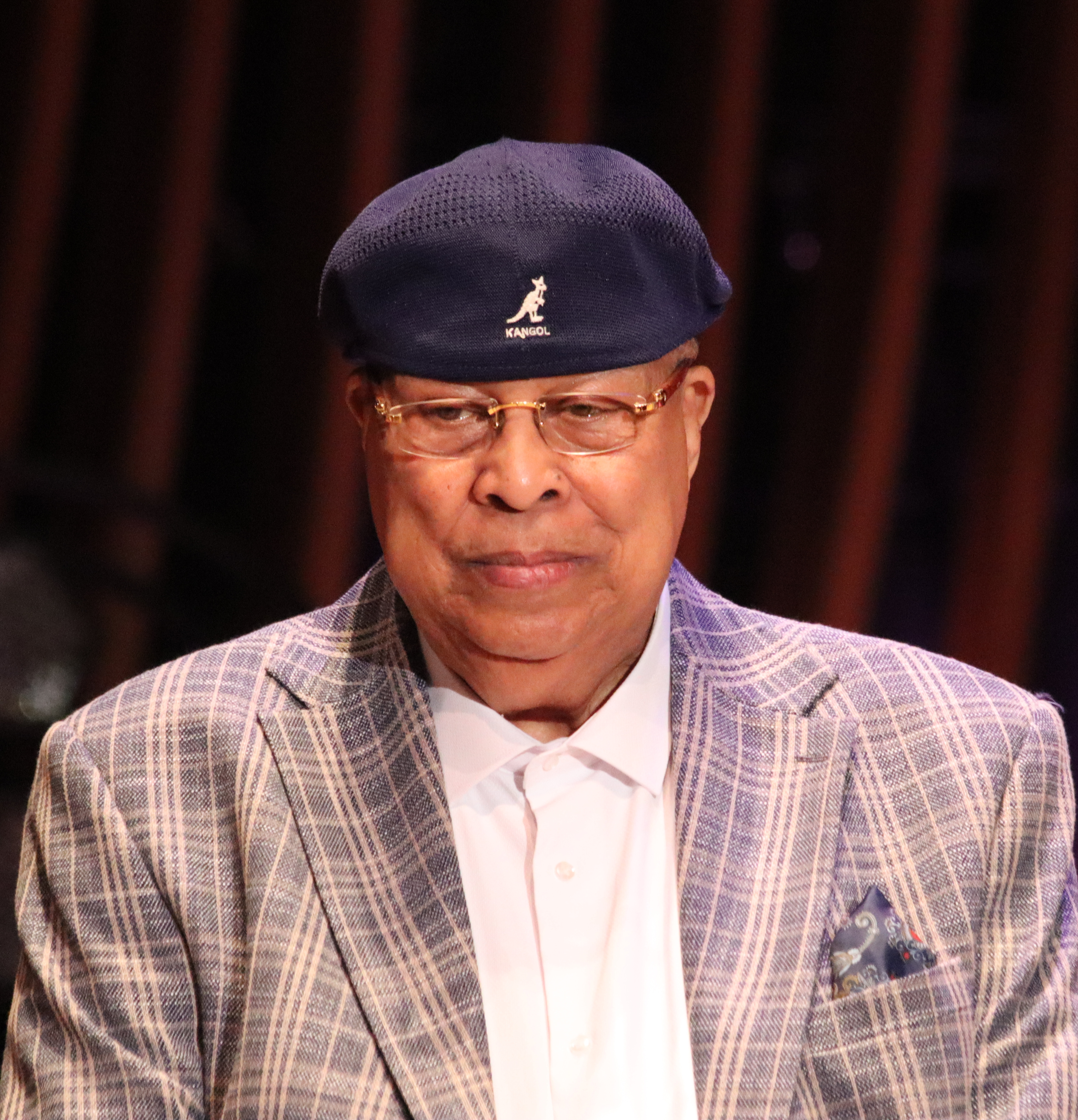
- Chucho Valdés in 2022

Background information
- Born: Dionisio Jesús Valdés Rodríguez; October 9, 1941 (age 84); Quivicán, Mayabeque, Cuba
- Genre: Afro-Cuban jazz
- Occupations: Musician; bandleader; composer
- Instrument: Piano
- Labels: EGREM; Messidor; Blue Note
- Formerly of: Irakere; Orquesta Cubana de Música Moderna
- Spouse: Lorena Salcedo (m. 2009)
- Website: www.chucho-valdes.com

Dionisio Jesús Valdés Rodríguez, better known as Chucho (born October 9, 1941), is a Cuban pianist, bandleader, composer and arranger whose career spans over 50 years. An original member of the Orquesta Cubana de Música Moderna, in 1973 he founded the group Irakere, one of Cuba's best-known Latin jazz bands.

Both his father, Bebo Valdés, and his son, Chuchito, are pianists as well. As a solo artist, he has won seven Grammy Awards and four Latin Grammy Awards.

== Career ==
Chucho Valdés's first recorded sessions as a leader took place in late January 1964 in the Areíto Studios of Havana (former Panart studios) owned by the newly formed EGREM. These early sessions included Paquito D'Rivera on alto saxophone and clarinet, Alberto Giral on trombone, Julio Vento on flute, Carlos Emilio Morales on guitar, Kike Hernández on double bass, Emilio del Monte on drums and Óscar Valdés Jr. on congas. Throughout the 1960s and 1970s, these would be the members of his jazz combo, whose lineup would often change, sometimes including bassists Cachaíto and later Carlos del Puerto, and drummers Guillermo Barreto and later Enrique Plá.

In 1967, Chucho and his bandmates became founding members of Orquesta Cubana de Música Moderna, together with many other well-known Cuban musicians. This all-star big band would back singers such as Elena Burke and Omara Portuondo. In 1973, Chucho along with other members of the Orquesta Cubana de Música Moderna founded Irakere, an ensemble that bridged songo and Afro-Cuban jazz. He would simultaneously continue his solo career, eventually signing with Blue Note Records, which allowed him to get international exposure. As a result, Chucho's work has received universal critical acclaim from the media, winning seven Grammy awards.

Chucho's father, Bebo, who attained a legendary status as the pianist and director of the Tropicana Club orchestra and Orquesta Sabor de Cuba, fled Cuba in 1960, and did not record music again until the 1990s. In the late 1990s, Chucho decided to focus on his solo career, and his son Chuchito replaced him as the pianist/director of Irakere. Chucho and Bebo occasionally played together until the latter's death in 2013. Since 2010, Chucho performs with a backing band known as the Afro-Cuban Messengers.

Chucho has spent much of his time teaching younger generations, either in his homeland of Cuba at the Havana National school (with many famous musicians such as Herbie Hancock), or elsewhere. Chucho is the father of six children: Chuchito Valdés Cortes, Emilio Valdés Cortes, Yousi Valdés Torres, Leyanis Valdés Reyes, Jessie Valdés Reyes, and Julian Valdés Salcedo.

== Awards and honors ==
Chucho has won four Grammy Awards as a solo artist:

- Best Latin Jazz Album in 2001 for his album Live at the Village Vanguard
- Best Latin Jazz Album in 2010 for Juntos Para Siempre, with his father Bebo Valdés
- Best Latin Jazz Album in 2011 for Chucho's Steps, with the Afro-Cuban Messengers
- Best Latin Jazz Album in 2017 for Tribute to Irakere: Live in Marciac.

Other albums of his nominated for a Latin Jazz Album Grammy include Bele Bele en la Habana (1999), Briyumba Palo Congo – Religion of the Congo (2000) and New Conceptions (2004).

He has also been part of two ensembles who have won Grammy Awards:

- Best Latin Recording in 1980 for the album Irakere by Irakere
- Best Latin Jazz Performance in 1998 for the album Habana, by Roy Hargrove's Crisol

He has won the following Latin Grammy Awards:

- Best Latin Jazz/Jazz Album in 2004 for New Conceptions
- Best Latin Jazz/Jazz Album in 2009 for Juntos Para Siempre
- Best Latin Jazz/Jazz Album in 2019 for Jazz Batá 2

On October 16, 2006, Chucho Valdés was nominated Goodwill Ambassador of the Food and Agriculture Organization of the United Nations (FAO).

In May 2011, Chucho Valdés was awarded an Honorary Doctorate of Music from Berklee College of Music

In April 2022, Chucho Valdés was awarded Best Latin Jazz Album Mirror Mirror with Eliane Elias & Chick Corea @grammyaward2022 Best Latin Jazz

In April 2025 he was honored with the Leonard Bernstein Award and Became an NEA Jazz Master 2025.

== Solo discography ==
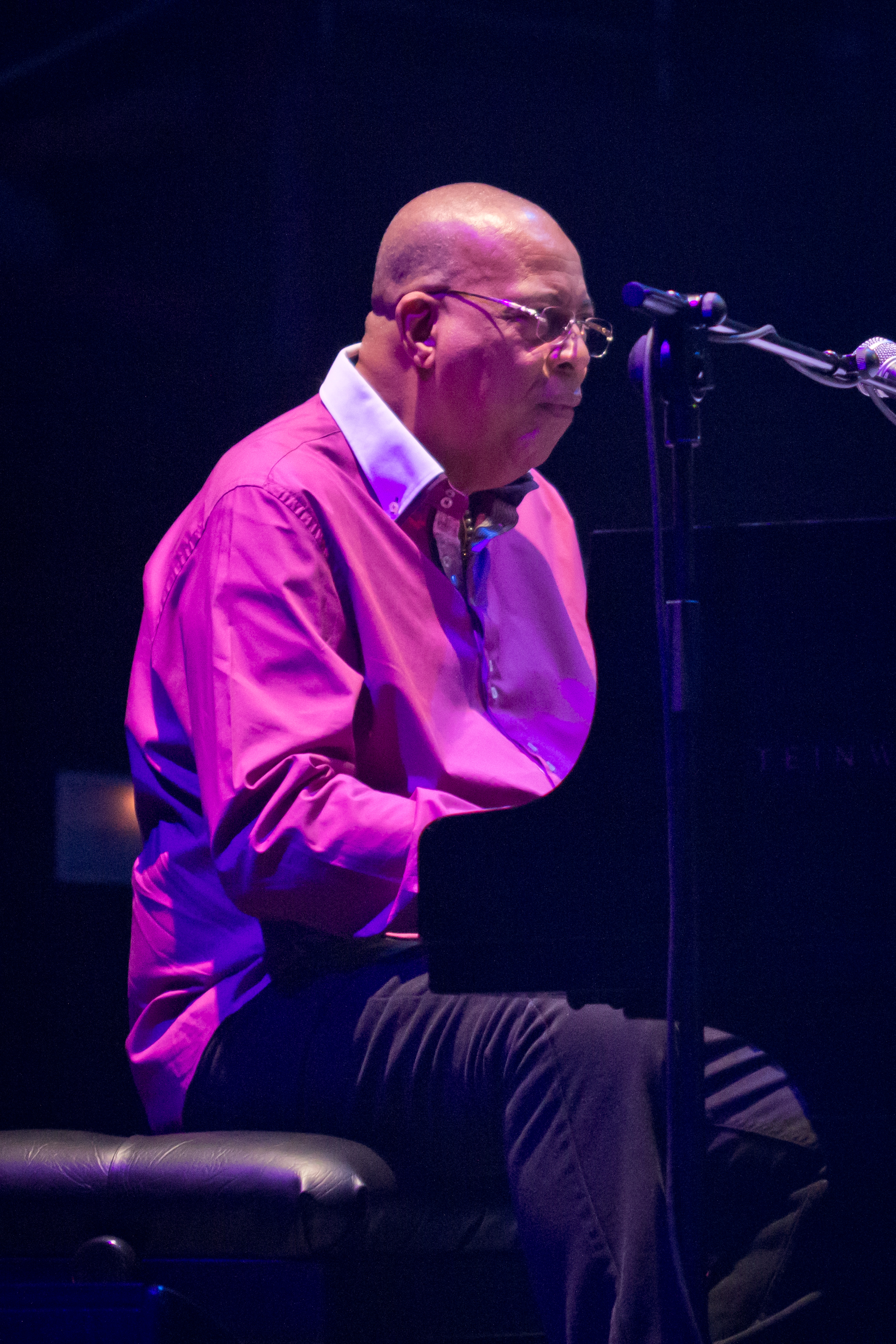
Valdés performing in 2014

=== Albums ===
- 1964: Jazz nocturno (Areito)
- 1964: Guapachá en La Habana (Areito) – with Guapachá
- 1970: Chucho Valdés (Areito)
- 1972: Jazz batá (Areito)
- 1976: Piano I (Areito)
- 1981: Tema de Chaka (Areito)
- 1986: Invitación (Areito)
- 1988: Lucumi (Messidor)
- 1988: Straight Ahead (Jazz House) – with Arturo Sandoval
- 1991: Solo Piano (Blue Note)
- 1998: Bele Bele en la Habana (Blue Note)
- 1999: Briyumba Palo Congo (Blue Note)
- 1999: Live (RMM) -- with Hilton Ruiz
- 2000: Live at the Village Vanguard (Blue Note)
- 2001: Solo: Live in New York (Blue Note)
- 2002: Canciones inéditas (EGREM)
- 2002: Fantasía Cubana: Variations on Classical Themes (Blue Note)
- 2003: New Conceptions (Blue Note)
- 2005: Cancionero cubano (EGREM)
- 2008: Canto a Dios (Comanche)
- 2008: Tumi Sessions (Tumi)
- 2008: Juntos para siempre (Sony) – with Bebo Valdés
- 2010: Chucho's Steps (Four-Quarters)
- 2013: Border-Free (Comanche)
- 2016: Tribute to Irakere: Live in Marciac (Live) (Comanche)
- 2024: Cuba & Beyond Innercat

=== EPs ===
- 1964: Por la libre (Areito)
- 1964: No me digan na (Areito) – with Guapachá
