= Macy Gray discography =

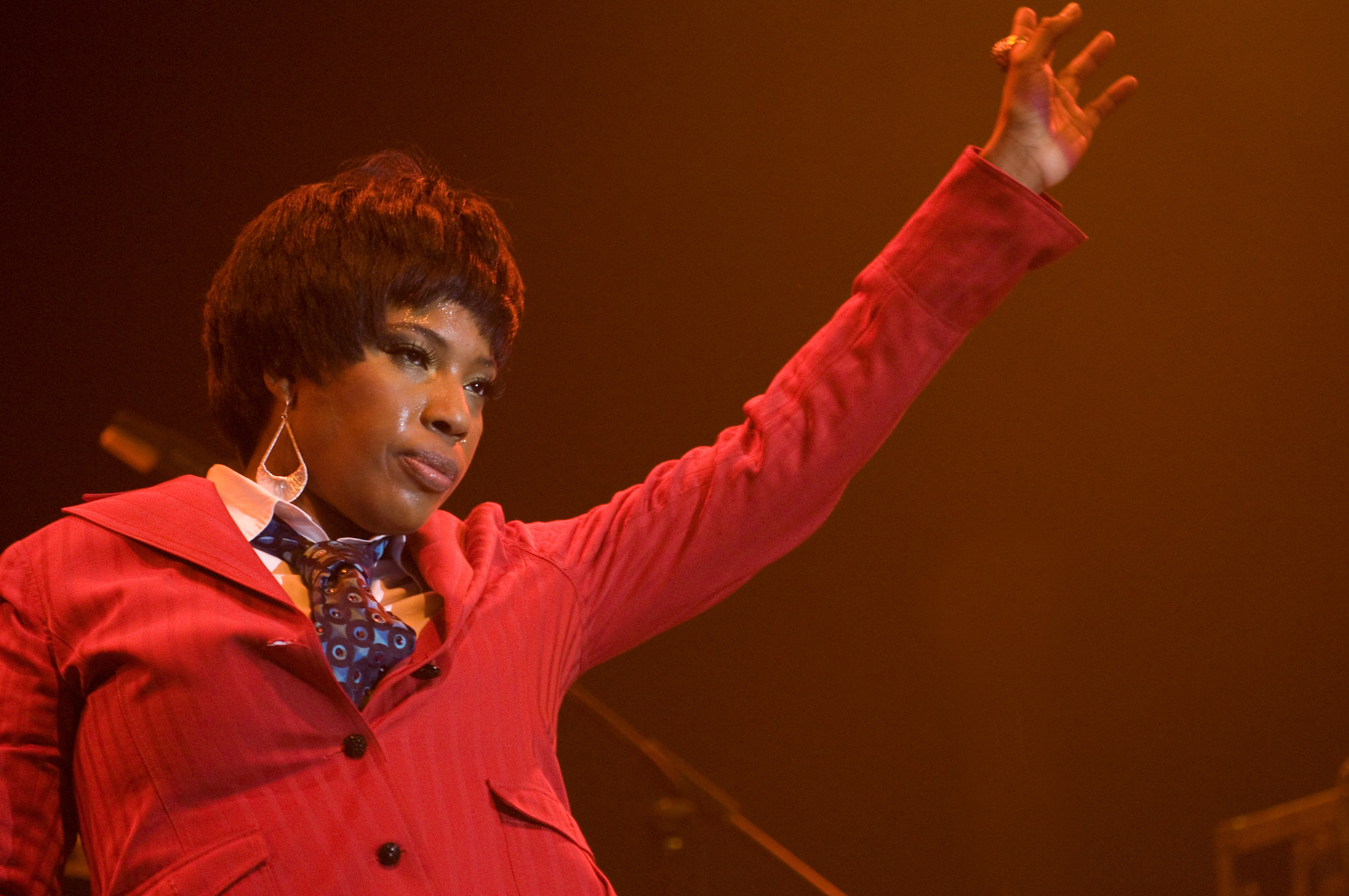
- Gray performing in July 2008
- Studio albums: 10
- Live albums: 1
- Compilation albums: 3
- Singles: 32
- Music videos: 21
- Promotional singles: 7

American R&B singer Macy Gray has released 10 studio albums, one live album, three compilation albums, 32 singles (including seven as a featured artist), seven promotional singles, and 21 music videos.

Gray has received five Grammy Award nominations, winning one. She has appeared in a number of films including Training Day, Spider-Man, Scary Movie 3, Lackawanna Blues, Idlewild, and For Colored Girls. Gray is known for her international hit single "I Try", taken from her multi-platinum debut album, On How Life Is.

== Albums ==
=== Studio albums ===
List of studio albums, with selected chart positions, sales figures, and certifications
Title	Details	Peak chart positions										Sales	Certifications
Title	Details	US	AUS	CAN	FRA	GER	IRE	NL	NZ	SWI	UK	Sales	Certifications
On How Life Is	Released: July 1, 1999; Label: Epic; Formats: CD, LP, cassette, MD	4	1	2	24	19	4	28	1	6	3	WW: 7,000,000; US: 3,400,000	RIAA: 3× Platinum; ARIA: 4× Platinum; BPI: 4× Platinum; BVMI: Gold; IFPI SWI: Platinum; MC: 3× Platinum; NVPI: Gold; RMNZ: 4× Platinum; SNEP: Gold
The Id	Released: September 17, 2001; Label: Epic; Formats: CD, LP, cassette	11	3	6	25	10	7	13	7	4	1	US: 593,000	RIAA: Gold; ARIA: Gold; BPI: Gold; IFPI SWI: Gold; MC: Platinum; RMNZ: Gold
The Trouble with Being Myself	Released: April 28, 2003; Label: Epic; Formats: CD, LP	44	23	88	61	46	40	18	41	10	17	US: 134,000	BPI: Silver; ARIA: Gold
Big	Released: March 21, 2007; Label: will.i.am, Geffen; Formats: CD, digital download	39	—	57	149	—	—	56	—	38	62	US: 111,000; UK: 12,000	
The Sellout	Released: June 21, 2010; Label: Concord; Formats: CD, digital download	38	—	97	62	—	—	76	—	28	128	US: 37,000	
Covered	Released: March 21, 2012; Label: 429; Formats: CD, digital download	— (Note: "Covered" did not enter the Billboard 200, but peaked at number 35 on the Top R&B/Hip-Hop Albums chart.)	—	—	—	—	—	—	—	—	—		
Talking Book	Released: October 29, 2012; Label: 429; Formats: CD, digital download	— (Note: "Talking Book" did not enter the Billboard 200, but peaked at number 65 on the Top R&B/Hip-Hop Albums chart.)	—	—	—	—	—	—	—	—	—		
The Way	Released: October 6, 2014; Label: Kobalt; Formats: CD, digital download	— (Note: "The Way" did not enter the Billboard 200, but peaked at number 33 on the Top R&B/Hip-Hop Albums chart and at number 19 on the Top R&B Albums chart.)	—	—	—	—	—	—	—	—	—		
Stripped	Released: September 9, 2016; Label: Chesky; Formats: CD, LP, digital download	— (Note: "Stripped" did not enter the Billboard 200, but peaked at number 47 on the Independent Albums chart and at number three on the Jazz Albums chart.)	—	—	—	—	—	—	—	—	—		
Ruby	Released: September 21, 2018; Label: Mack Avenue; Formats: CD, LP, digital download	— (Note: "Ruby" did not enter the Billboard 200, but peaked at number 27 on the Independent Albums chart and number five on the R&B Album Sales chart.)	—	—	—	—	—	—	—	41	—		
"—" denotes a recording that did not chart or was not released in that territory.

=== Live albums ===
Title	Details
Live in Las Vegas	Released: August 30, 2005; Label: NuTech Digital; Formats: CD, DVD

=== Compilation albums ===
List of compilation albums, with selected chart positions
Title	Details	Peak chart positions		
Title	Details	NL	SWI	UK
The Very Best of Macy Gray	Released: August 30, 2004; Label: Epic; Formats: CD, digital download	50	84	36
I Try: The Macy Gray Collection	Released: October 6, 2008; Label: Sony BMG; Formats: CD, digital download	—	—	—
Original Album Classics	Released: January 9, 2012; Label: Legacy, Epic; Formats: 3× CD, digital download	—	—	—
"—" denotes a recording that did not chart or was not released in that territory.

== Singles ==
=== As lead artist ===
List of singles as lead artist, with selected chart positions and certifications, showing year released and album name
Title	Year	Peak chart positions											Certifications	Album
Title	Year	US	US R&B	US Adult R&B	AUS	CAN	GER	IRE	NL	NZ	SWI	UK	Certifications	Album
"Do Something"	1999	—	63	31	103	—	—	—	75	32	—	51		On How Life Is
"I Try"	1999	5	—	35	1	19	16	1	60	1	13	6	ARIA: Platinum; BPI: 2× Platinum	On How Life Is
"Still"	2000	—	—	—	21	—	92	30	90	8	—	18	ARIA: Gold	On How Life Is
"Why Didn't You Call Me"	2000	— (Note: "Why Didn't You Call Me" did not enter the Billboard Hot 100, but peaked at number seven on the Bubbling Under Hot 100 Singles chart.)	—	—	146	—	—	—	—	35	—	38		On How Life Is
"Sweet Baby" (featuring Erykah Badu)	2001	—	—	—	39	16	—	43	80	12	36	23		The Id
"Sexual Revolution"	2001	—	—	—	68	—	—	50	89	—	91	45		The Id
"When I See You"	2003	— (Note: "When I See You" did not enter the Billboard Hot 100, but peaked at number 23 on the Hot Digital Tracks chart.)	—	—	34	—	—	—	66	—	—	26		The Trouble with Being Myself
"Oh Yeah" (with Keziah Jones)	2004	—	—	—	—	—	—	—	—	—	—	—		Unity: The Official Athens 2004 Olympic Games Album
"Love Is Gonna Get You"	2004	—	—	—	—	—	—	—	95	—	—	—		The Very Best of Macy Gray
"Finally Made Me Happy" (featuring Natalie Cole)	2007	—	—	—	—	—	—	—	—	—	—	—		Big
"Shoo Be Doo"	2007	—	55	11	—	—	—	—	—	—	—	—		Big
"What I Gotta Do"	2007	—	67	20	—	—	—	—	—	—	—	—		Big
"Beauty in the World"	2010	—	—	—	—	—	—	—	52	—	—	—		The Sellout
"Kissed It" (featuring Velvet Revolver)	2010	—	—	—	—	—	—	—	—	—	—	—		The Sellout
"Lately"	2010	—	—	—	—	—	—	—	—	—	—	—		The Sellout
"Sail"	2012	—	—	—	—	—	—	—	—	—	—	—		Covered
"Creep" (acoustic version)	2012	—	—	—	—	—	—	—	—	—	—	—		Covered
"Stoned"	2014	—	—	—	—	—	—	—	—	—	—	—		The Way
"Bang Bang"	2014	—	—	—	—	—	—	—	—	—	—	—		The Way
"Hands"	2014	—	—	—	—	—	—	—	—	—	—	—		The Way
"White Man"	2017	—	—	—	—	—	—	—	—	—	—	—		Ruby
"Sugar Daddy"	2018	—	—	21	—	—	—	—	—	—	—	—		Ruby
"Buddha" (featuring Gary Clark Jr.)	2019	—	—	—	—	—	—	—	—	—	—	—		Ruby
"Hide the Hurt"	2019	—	—	—	—	—	—	—	—	—	—	—		Non-album single
"Every Night" (with the California Jet Club and Maino)	2022	—	—	—	—	—	—	—	—	—	—	—		Non-album single
"—" denotes a recording that did not chart or was not released in that territory.

=== As featured artist ===
List of singles as featured artist, with selected chart positions, showing year released and album name
Title	Year	Peak chart positions								Album
Title	Year	US	US R&B	AUS	GER	IRE	NL	NZ	UK	Album
"Demons" (Fatboy Slim featuring Macy Gray)	2001	—	—	78	—	43	78	—	16	Halfway Between the Gutter and the Stars
"Geto Heaven Remix T.S.O.I. (The Sound of Illadelph)" (Common featuring Macy Gray)	2001	—	61	—	—	—	—	—	48	Like Water for Chocolate (alternative version)
"Request + Line" (Black Eyed Peas featuring Macy Gray)	2001	63	51	21	85	45	86	10	31	Bridging the Gap
"Can't Hold Back" (Kaz James featuring Macy Gray)	2009	—	—	42	—	—	—	—	—	If They Knew
"Electrolytes" (N.O.R.E. featuring Macy Gray and DMX)	2011	—	—	—	—	—	—	—	—	Scared Money
"No War" (DJ Bizzy featuring Tru Wordz, Thurz, Macy Gray and Murs)	2013	—	—	—	—	—	—	—	—	Non-album single
"SuperHero" (Steven Lee vs. Goldie featuring Macy Gray)	2015	—	—	—	—	—	—	—	—	TeamWork
"—" denotes a recording that did not chart or was not released in that territory.

=== Promotional singles ===
List of promotional singles, with selected chart positions, showing year released and album name
Title	Year	Peaks	Album
Title	Year	UK	Album
"Winter Wonderland"	2000	76	Ally McBeal: A Very Ally Christmas
"Hey Young World II" (featuring Slick Rick)	2001	—	The Id
"Shed"	2001	—	The Id
"She Ain't Right for You"	2003	—	The Trouble with Being Myself
"We Will Rock You"	2003	—	The Trouble with Being Myself
"I Tried" (Al Di Meola featuring Angie Stone and Macy Gray)	2006	—	Vocal Rendezvous
"The Sellout"	2010	—	The Sellout
"—" denotes a recording that did not chart or was not released in that territory.

== Guest appearances ==
List of non-single guest appearances, with other performing artists, showing year released and album name
Title	Year	Other artist(s)	Album
"All I Said"	2000	Guru	Guru's Jazzmatazz: Streetsoul
"Love & War"	2001	Anthony Hamilton	Baby Boy: Music From the Motion Picture
"The World Is Yours"	2001	Slick Rick	Rush Hour 2 Soundtrack
"We've Got Enough"	2001	None	Red Star Sounds Volume One: Soul Searching
"This Christmas (Hang All the Mistletoe)"	2001	None	A Very Special Christmas 5
"Smile"	2001	Ké	Better Way of Living
"Water No Get Enemy"	2002	D'Angelo, Femi Kuti, Roy Hargrove, Nile Rodgers, The Soultronics, Positive Force	Red Hot + Riot
"Amoré (Sexo)"	2002	Santana	Shaman
"Time of My Life"	2002	None	Music from and Inspired by the Motion Picture 8 Mile
"Cell Block Tango (He Had It Comin')"	2002	Queen Latifah, Lil' Kim	Chicago: Music from the Miramax Motion Picture
"Santa Baby"	2003	None	Mona Lisa Smile: Music from the Motion Picture
"Like the Sun"	2004	Zucchero, Jeff Beck	Zu & Co.
"Hound Dog"	2004	None	Lightning in a Bottle
"Love and War"	2005	Anthony Hamilton	Soulife
"ODB, Don't Go Breaking My Heart"	2005	Ol' Dirty Bastard	A Son Unique
"Intoxicated"	2005	Ol' Dirty Bastard, Raekwon, Method Man	A Son Unique
"Boom Boom"	2005	None	Music from and Inspired by Desperate Housewives
"Real"	2005	None	Domino: Music from the Motion Picture
"Greatest Show on Earth"	2006	Outkast	Idlewild
"Coming Back to You"	2006	None	Déjà Vu: Original Soundtrack
"Don't Forget Me"	2009	None	Confessions of a Shopaholic: Original Soundtrack
"Your Mouth"	2010	None	The Frank Zappa AAAFNRAAAA Birthday Bundle 2010
"Off to Sea Once More"	2013	None	Son of Rogues Gallery: Pirate Ballads, Sea Songs & Chanteys
"Be My Monster Love"	2013	David Murray Infinity Quartet	Be My Monster Love
"I Don't Even Care"	2013	Robert Glasper Experiment, Jean Grae	Black Radio 2 (deluxe edition)
"Into the Deep"	2015	Galactic	Into the Deep
"Leave Me Lonely"	2016	Ariana Grande	Dangerous Woman
"Forever Survivor"	2016	Far East Movement	Identity
"Beautiful"	2020	None	Good Night Songs for Rebel Girls

== Music videos ==
=== As lead artist ===
List of music videos as lead artist, showing year released and directors
Title	Year	Director(s)	Ref.
"Do Something"	1999	Mark Romanek	
"I Try"	1999	Mark Romanek	
"Still" (first version)	2000	Big TV!	
"Why Didn't You Call Me"	2000	Hype Williams	
"Still" (second version)	2000	Jonas Åkerlund	
"Sweet Baby" (featuring Erykah Badu)	2001	Dave Meyers	
"Sexual Revolution"	2001	Jonathan Dayton and Valerie Faris	
"When I See You"	2003	Bryan Barber	
"She Ain't Right for You"	2003	David LaChapelle	
"Finally Made Me Happy" (featuring Natalie Cole)	2007	Meiert Avis	
"Everybody"	2007	Joshua Kameyer	
"Beauty in the World"	2010	Adria Petty	
"Real Love" (featuring Bobby Brown)	2010	Unknown	
"Smoke Two Joints"	2012	Robert de Vico	
"Bang Bang"	2014	Stan Brooks	
"Hands"	2014	RAGE	
"B.O.B"	2015	Dan Fusselman	

=== As featured artist ===
List of music videos as featured artist, showing year released and directors
Title	Year	Director(s)	Ref.
"Demons" (Fatboy Slim featuring Macy Gray)	2000	Garth Jennings	
"Geto Heaven Remix T.S.O.I. (The Sound of Illadelph)" (Common featuring Macy Gray)	2000	Nzingha Stewart	
"Request Line" (Black Eyed Peas featuring Macy Gray)	2001	Joseph Kahn	
"Can't Hold Back" (Kaz James featuring Macy Gray)	2009	Syndrome	
