= The Very Best of Macy Gray =

Greatest hits album by Macy Gray
- Released: August 30, 2004
- Studio: Various: Paramount (Hollywood, California) (Note: Tracks 1–11); Record Plant (Hollywood, California) (Note: Tracks 6–8); Aragon Ballroom (Chicago, Illinois); The Studio (Philadelphia, Pennsylvania); Remote Recording Services (Philadelphia, Pennsylvania); Ameraycan (North Hollywood, California) (Note: Tracks 9–11); O'Henry Sound (Burbank, California); Royaltone (North Hollywood, California); Way Station (Los Angeles, California) (Note: Track 12); The Farm (Dublin, Ireland) (Note: Track 13); Enterprise (Burbank, California); Capitol (Hollywood, California); Conway (Hollywood, California); D&D (New York City, New York) (Note: Track 16); HMS House (Hove, England) (Note: Track 17)
- Genre: R&B; soul; neo soul
- Length: 71:01
- Label: Epic
- Producer: Dallas Austin; Bugz in the Attic; DJ Kiilu Grand; Mike Elizondo; Damon Elliott; Fatboy Slim; Gang Starr; Macy Gray; Josh Rabinowitz; Jeremy Ruzumna; Andrew Slater; Darryl Swann; Dave Way

Macy Gray chronology
The Trouble with Being Myself (2003)	The Very Best of Macy Gray (2004)	Live in Las Vegas (2005)

Singles from The Very Best of Macy Gray
- 1. "Love Is Gonna Get You" Released: August 16, 2004

Professional ratings
Review scores
Source	Rating
AllMusic	3.5/5 stars
Encyclopedia of Popular Music	4/5 stars

The Very Best of Macy Gray is the first greatest hits album by American singer and songwriter Macy Gray. It was released on August 30, 2004, by Epic Records. It contains all singles from Gray's first three studio albums, as well as two previously unreleased tracks (the single "Love Is Gonna Get You" and a cover of Aerosmith's 1975 song "Walk This Way"), three album tracks, three remixes, and the 2000 single "Demons", a collaboration with Fatboy Slim. The album peaked at number 36 on the UK Albums Chart and charted moderately in other European countries.

On December 1, 2008, the album was reissued in the United Kingdom including "Winter Wonderland", which first appeared as a B-side to "Sexual Revolution" and was featured in the Marks & Spencer Christmas ads. A few weeks later, the song reached number 76 on the UK Singles Chart.

== Track listing ==
No.	Title	Writer(s)	Producer(s)	Length
1.	"I Try"	Macy Gray; Jeremy Ruzumna; Jinsoo Lim; David Wilder	Andrew Slater	3:59
2.	"Do Something"	Gray; Patrick Brown; Raymon Murray; Rico Wade; Cameron Gipp; Thomas Burton; André Benjamin; Antwan Patton; Greg Mays; Darryl Barnes; Ruzumna; Darryl Swann; Robert Barnett; Dion Derek Murdock	Slater	4:57
3.	"Still"	Gray; Ruzumna; Bill Esses; Jeff Blue	Slater	4:15
4.	"Why Didn't You Call Me"	Ruzumna; Gray	Slater	3:14
5.	"I've Committed Murder"	Gray; Swann; Kiilu Beckwith; Ruzumna; Eddie Harris; Francis Lai; Carl Sigman	Slater	4:59
6.	"Sexual Revolution"	Gray; Ruzumna; Wilder; Swann	Swann; Gray	4:45
7.	"Sweet Baby" (featuring Erykah Badu)	Gray; Joe Solo	Swann; Gray	3:49
8.	"Boo"	Gray; Swann; Ruzumna; Wilder; Victor Indrizzo; Zac Rae	Swann; Gray	4:25
9.	"When I See You"	Gray; Ruzumna; Indrizzo; Justin Meldal-Johnsen	Gray; Dallas Austin^{[a]}; Dave Way^{[a]}; Swann^{[b]}	3:43
10.	"It Ain't the Money" (featuring Pharoahe Monch)	Gray; Ruzumna; Indrizzo; Meldal-Johnsen; Beck Hansen; Pharoahe Monch	Gray; DJ Kiilu Grand^{[a]}	4:07
11.	"She Ain't Right for You"	Gray; Ruzumna; Indrizzo; Meldal-Johnsen	Gray; Austin^{[a]}	4:12
12.	"Love Is Gonna Get You"	Natalie McIntyre Hinds; Michael A. Elizondo Jr.	Mike Elizondo	3:00
13.	"Walk This Way"	Steven Tyler; Joe Perry	Damon Elliott	3:31
14.	"Demons" (Fatboy Slim featuring Macy Gray)	Fatboy Slim; Gray; Bill Withers	Fatboy Slim	3:14
15.	"When I See You" (Bugz in the Attic Remix)	Gray; Ruzumna; Indrizzo; Meldal-Johnsen	Gray; Austin^{[a]}; Way^{[a]}; Swann^{[b]}; Bugz in the Attic^{[c]}	6:35
16.	"I've Committed Murder" (Gang Starr Main Mix) (featuring Mos Def)	Gray; Swann; Beckwith; Ruzumna; Harris; Lai; Sigman	Slater; Gang Starr^{[c]}	4:38
17.	"Sexual Revolution" (Norman Cook Radio Mix at 128BPM)	Gray; Ruzumna; Wilder; Swann	Swann; Gray; Cook^{[c]}	3:32

Japanese edition
No.	Title	Writer(s)	Producer(s)	Length
14.	"We Will Rock You"	Brian May		3:03
15.	"Demons" (Fatboy Slim featuring Macy Gray)	Fatboy Slim; Gray; Withers	Fatboy Slim	3:14
16.	"When I See You" (Bugz in the Attic Remix)	Gray; Ruzumna; Indrizzo; Meldal-Johnsen	Gray; Austin^{[a]}; Way^{[a]}; Swann^{[b]}; Bugz in the Attic^{[c]}	6:35
17.	"I've Committed Murder" (Gang Starr Main Mix) (featuring Mos Def)	Gray; Swann; Beckwith; Ruzumna; Harris; Lai; Sigman	Slater; Gang Starr^{[c]}	4:38
18.	"Sexual Revolution" (Norman Cook Radio Mix at 128BPM)	Gray; Ruzumna; Wilder; Swann	Swann; Gray; Cook^{[c]}	3:32

UK reissue bonus track
No.	Title	Writer(s)	Producer(s)	Length
18.	"Winter Wonderland"	Felix Bernard; Dick Smith	Slater	2:53

Notes

- ^{^a} signifies a co-producer
- ^{^b} signifies a vocal producer
- ^{^c} signifies a remixer

Sample credits

- "Do Something" contains a sample of "Git Up, Git Out" by OutKast and "Funky for You" by Nice & Smooth.
- "I've Committed Murder" contains a sample of "Live Right Now" by Eddie Harris and an interpolation of "(Where Do I Begin?) Love Story" by Francis Lai & His Orchestra.
- "Demons" contains a sample of "I Can't Write Left-Handed" by Bill Withers.

== Charts ==
Chart (2004)	Peak position
Australian Urban Albums (ARIA)	18
Belgian Albums (Ultratop Flanders)	52
Canadian R&B Albums (Nielsen SoundScan)	63
Dutch Albums (Album Top 100)	50
Italian Albums (FIMI)	58
Portuguese Albums (AFP)	23
Scottish Albums (OCC)	25
Swiss Albums (Schweizer Hitparade)	84
UK Albums (OCC)	36
UK R&B Albums (OCC)	31

== Release history ==
Region	Date	Label	Ref.
United Kingdom	August 30, 2004	Epic	
United States	September 7, 2004	Epic	
Japan	October 20, 2004	Sony	
Germany	November 22, 2004	Sony	
United Kingdom (reissue)	December 1, 2008	Sony CMG	
