= Live in Las Vegas (Macy Gray album) =

Live album by Macy Gray
- Released: August 30, 2005 (U.S.); September 5, 2005 (UK)
- Venues: House of Blues at Mandalay Bay; Las Vegas, Nevada, United States
- Genres: R&B; soul; neo soul
- Length: 94:58
- Label: NuTech Digital

Macy Gray chronology
The Very Best of Macy Gray (2004)	Live in Las Vegas (2005)	Big (2007)

Professional ratings
Review scores
Source	Rating
Allmusic	2/5 stars

Live in Las Vegas is a live album by American R&B-soul singer-songwriter Macy Gray. The album was recorded at the House of Blues in Las Vegas, Nevada, in 2004 and released on DVD and CD in 2005.

== Critical reception ==
Live in Las Vegas received generally negative reviews from music critics. In his 2-star review for Allmusic, Andy Kellman the album is criticized for its "sloppiness," though it is noted that "the images will be there to distract you from the faults of the performance."

== Track listing ==
=== Disc one ===
1. "Sex-O-Matic Venus Freak" – 7:18
2. "When I See You" – 3:52 - credited as "When I See You Again"
3. "Relating to a Psychopath" – 3:49
4. "Don't Come Around" – 2:55
5. "Caligula" – 7:42
6. "Why Didn't You Call Me" – 3:42
7. "Things That Made Me Change" – 6:36
8. "Hey Young World Part 2" – 5:05
9. "I've Committed Murder" – 5:30
10. "Do Something" – 3:45

=== Disc two ===
1. "Demons" – 5:51
2. "Sexual Revolution" – 5:59
3. "Oblivion" – 3:50
4. "I Try" – 8:14
5. "Sweet Baby" – 5:22
6. "She Ain't Right for You" – 4:38
7. "I Can't Wait to Meetchu" – 4:13
8. "The Letter" – 6:55
