= The Id (album) =

Studio album by Macy Gray
- Released: September 17, 2001
- Studios: Paramount, Hollywood; Record Plant, Hollywood; The Studio, Philadelphia; Remote Recording Services, Philadelphia; Aragon Ballroom, Chicago
- Genres: R&B; soul; neo soul
- Length: 56:25
- Label: Epic
- Producers: Kiilu Grand; Macy Gray; Raphael Saadiq; Darryl Swann; Ahmir "Questlove" Thompson

Macy Gray chronology
On How Life Is (1999)	The Id (2001)	The Trouble with Being Myself (2003)

Singles from The Id
- 1. "Sweet Baby" Released: August 27, 2001; 2. "Sexual Revolution" Released: November 26, 2001

Professional ratings
Aggregate scores
Source	Rating
Metacritic	71/100
Review scores
Source	Rating
AllMusic	3/5 stars
Blender	4/5 stars
Chicago Sun-Times	4/4 stars
Entertainment Weekly	B
The Guardian	4/5 stars
Los Angeles Times	3.5/4 stars
NME	2.5/5 stars
Q	3/5 stars
Rolling Stone	4/5 stars
Spin	8/10

The Id is the second studio album by American singer and songwriter Macy Gray. It was released on September 17, 2001, by Epic Records. The album was not as commercially successful as its predecessor, On How Life Is, in the United States, where it debuted at number 11 on the Billboard 200 with 93,000 copies sold in its first week. As of January 2004, it had sold 593,000 copies in the US. Elsewhere, The Id topped the charts in the United Kingdom and Denmark, while reaching the top five in Australia, Italy, and Switzerland.

The Tom Morello mix of "My Nutmeg Phantasy" was included on the soundtrack to the 2002 film Spider-Man, and "Relating to a Psychopath" was featured in the 2002 Disney Channel Original Movie Cadet Kelly.

== Track listing ==
No.	Title	Lyrics	Music	Producer(s)	Length
1.	"Relating to a Psychopath"	Macy Gray	Jeremy Ruzumna; Darryl Swann; Dave Wilder	Swann; Gray	4:48
2.	"Boo"	Gray	Swann; Ruzumna; Wilder; Victor Indrizzo; Zac Rae	Swann; Gray	4:25
3.	"Sexual Revolution"	Gray	Ruzumna; Wilder; Swann	Swann; Gray	4:45
4.	"Hey Young World Part 2" (featuring Slick Rick)	Ricky Walters	Walters	Swann; Gray; Kiilu Grand^{[a]}; Ahmir "Questlove" Thompson^{[b]}	4:03
5.	"Sweet Baby" (featuring Erykah Badu)	Gray	Joe Solo	Swann; Gray	3:49
6.	"Harry"	Gray	Gray	Swann; Gray	3:10
7.	"Gimme All Your Lovin' or I Will Kill You"	Gray	Rita Marley; Arik Marshall; Ruzumna; Swann	Swann; Gray	4:45
8.	"Don't Come Around" (featuring Sunshine Anderson)	Gray	Ruzumna	Swann; Gray; Raphael Saadiq^{[a]}	4:37
9.	"My Nutmeg Phantasy" (featuring Angie Stone and Mos Def)	Gray; Lonnie Marshall	Marshall; Keith Ciancia; Tom Ralls; Finn Hammer; Swann	Swann; Gray	4:55
10.	"Freak Like Me"	Gray	Eric Hord; Gary Zekley; Swann	Swann; Gray	3:38
11.	"Oblivion"	Gray	Brian Lester	Swann; Gray	2:49
12.	"Forgiveness"	Gray	Swann; Hoyt Axton	Swann; Gray	5:17
13.	"Blowin' Up Your Speakers"		Gray; Swann	Swann; Gray	1:07
14.	"Shed" (hidden track)	Gray	Gray; Swann; Ruzumna	Swann; Gray	4:17

Notes

- ^{^a} signifies a co-producer
- ^{^b} signifies an additional producer

Sample credits

- "Hey Young World Part 2" contains elements of "Ms. Fat Booty 2" by Mos Def featuring Ghostface Killah.
- "Gimme All Your Lovin' or I Will Kill You" contains an interpolation of "Jah Jah Don't Want" by Rita Marley.
- "Freak Like Me" embodies portions of "Tell Me Who You Love" by Chris Knight and Maureen McCormick.
- "Forgiveness" contains elements of "Never Been to Spain" by Three Dog Night.

== Personnel ==
Credits adapted from the liner notes of The Id.

=== Musicians ===
- Macy Gray – vocals (tracks 1–12, 14); vocal arrangement (tracks 1–4, 6, 8–11); background vocals (tracks 1, 2)
- Victor Indrizzo – drums (tracks 1, 2, 5, 9–13); additional drums (track 6)
- Marina Bambino – percussion (tracks 1, 3, 5); background vocals (tracks 1, 8)
- Davey Chegwidden – percussion (tracks 1, 6)
- Dave Wilder – bass (tracks 1, 4–7)
- Jinsoo Lim – guitar (tracks 1, 3, 4, 9, 10)
- Darryl Swann – guitar (tracks 1, 7, 9); vocal arrangement (tracks 2–4, 6, 8, 9, 11); acoustic guitar (tracks 2, 10, 12, 13); string arrangement (track 4); skit (track 7); background vocals (tracks 9, 11); percussion (tracks 12, 13); programming (all tracks)
- Jeremy Ruzumna – Moog (tracks 1, 3); clav, tack piano (track 1); organ (tracks 1, 5–7, 10, 12, 13); piano (tracks 4, 8, 10); synths, skit (track 7); whirly (track 9)
- Zac Rae – Chamberlin (tracks 1, 2, 4–7, 12, 13); Casio (tracks 1, 2); Stylophone (track 1); Rhodes (track 2); guitar (track 4); piano (tracks 4, 5, 9, 10, 12, 13); organ (track 6); Moog (track 9); whirly, synths (track 10); clarinet, Wurlitzer, orchestration (tracks 12, 13)
- Stephanie Alexander – background vocals (tracks 1–3, 6, 8, 11)
- Dawn Beckman – background vocals (tracks 1, 3, 6–11); skit (track 7); vocal arrangement (track 10)
- Sy Smith – background vocals (tracks 1–3, 6–9); vocal arrangement (track 7)
- Ericka Yancey – background vocals (tracks 1, 3)
- Mike Elizondo – bass (tracks 2, 3, 8, 10–13)
- Arik Marshall – guitar (tracks 2, 3, 6, 7, 12); lead guitar (track 13)
- Lejon Walker – background vocals (tracks 2, 9)
- Latina Webb – background vocals (track 2)
- Lili Haydn – string arrangement, strings (track 3)
- Printz Board – horn arrangement (tracks 3, 7–9); background vocals (track 3); trumpet (tracks 3, 7–9, 12, 13)
- Steve Baxter – trombone (tracks 3, 7–9); background vocals (track 3)
- Tim "Izo" Orindgreff – saxophone (tracks 3, 7, 9); background vocals (track 3); clarinet (tracks 6, 9); flute (tracks 7, 8)
- Issiah Avila – drums (track 3); additional drums (track 6)
- Ahmir "Questlove" Thompson – percussion (tracks 3, 4, 6–13); drums (tracks 4, 6, 8)
- Jane Lopez – background vocals (track 3)
- Slick Rick – guest vocals (track 4)
- Kiilu Grand – turntables (tracks 4, 6, 9, 12, 13)
- Herb Graham Jr. – additional drums (tracks 4, 6)
- Aanisah Hinds – kids choir (track 4)
- Mel Hinds – kids choir (track 4)
- Kaya Tafari Joseph – kids choir (track 4)
- Sequoia Reyes – kids choir (track 4)
- Shawki Jibri – kids choir (track 4)
- Darice Murphy – kids choir (track 4)
- Ronesha Davis – kids choir (track 4)
- Tyler Beckwith – kids choir (track 4)
- Paloma Elsesser – kids choir (track 4)
- Sunnie Shawn – kids choir (track 4)
- Erykah Badu – guest vocals, vocal arrangement (track 5)
- Charles Veal Jr. – string arrangement (tracks 5, 8)
- John Frusciante – guitar (track 5)
- Billy Preston – organ (tracks 5, 8, 9); clav (track 9)
- Darren Johnson – Rhodes (track 5)
- Keefus Ciancia – Farfisa (track 5); whirly (tracks 7, 9); Moog, synths (track 7); Kurzweil (track 9)
- Rick Rubin – vocal arrangement (track 5)
- Frank Walker – percussion (tracks 6, 10–13)
- Dustin Boyer – guitar (track 6)
- Tim Carmon – organ (track 6)
- Fannie Franklin – background vocals (tracks 6, 7, 9, 11)
- Audra Cunningham Nishita – background vocals (tracks 6, 7, 9, 11); skit (track 7)
- Pamela Williams – background vocals (tracks 7, 9)
- Sunshine Anderson – guest vocals (track 8)
- Raphael Saadiq – string arrangement, guitar (track 8)
- James Wooten – organ (track 8)
- Angie Stone – guest vocals (track 9)
- Mos Def – guest vocals (track 9)
- Dion Murdock – additional drums (track 9)
- Lonnie "Meganut" Marshall – bass (track 9)
- Gabby Lang – sitar (track 9)
- Marc Cross – background vocals (track 9)
- Brian J. Durack – pipe organ (track 11)
- Thom Russo – background vocals (track 11)
- Tom Ralls – trombone (tracks 12, 13)
- Tracy Wannamoe – bass clarinet (tracks 12, 13)

=== Technical ===
- Kiilu Grand – co-production (track 4)
- Ahmir "Questlove" Thompson – additional production, mixing (track 4)
- Raphael Saadiq – co-production (track 8)
- Thom Russo – additional mixing (track 11); Pro Tools engineering, additional engineering (all tracks)
- Darryl Swann – production, engineering
- Macy Gray – production, executive production
- Rick Rubin – executive production
- Dave Way – mixing
- Vlado Meller – mastering
- Tim LeBlanc – mix assistance, additional engineering
- Jay Goin – mix assistance, second engineer
- Rich Veltrop – mix assistance
- Anthony Kilhoffer – mix assistance
- Robert Read – mix assistance
- Allissa Myhowich – mix assistance
- Mike Melnick – additional engineering
- Adam Olmstead – additional engineering
- Jeff Chestek – additional engineering
- Phil Gitomer – additional engineering, second engineer
- Sean McClintock – additional engineering, second engineer
- John Myers – additional engineering
- Neil Ward – second engineer
- Kristof Zizka – second engineer
- Ricky Chao – second engineer
- Steve Kadison – mastering assistance
- Jim Goodwin – additional Pro Tools

=== Artwork ===
- Helmut Newton – photography
- Adam Owett – executive creative direction
- Hooshik – art direction, design
- Kristian Russell – illustration

== Charts ==
=== Weekly charts ===
Chart (2001)	Peak position
Australian Albums (ARIA)	3
Australian Urban Albums (ARIA)	1
Austrian Albums (Ö3 Austria)	7
Belgian Albums (Ultratop Flanders)	8
Belgian Albums (Ultratop Wallonia)	7
Canadian Albums (Billboard)	6
Canadian R&B Albums (Nielsen SoundScan)	6
Danish Albums (Hitlisten)	1
European Albums (Music & Media)	2
Finnish Albums (Suomen virallinen lista)	8
French Albums (SNEP)	25
German Albums (Offizielle Top 100)	10
Irish Albums (IRMA)	7
Italian Albums (FIMI)	4
Japanese Albums (Oricon)	34
New Zealand Albums (RMNZ)	7
Norwegian Albums (VG-lista)	8
Polish Albums (ZPAV)	7
Scottish Albums (Official Charts)	1
Swedish Albums (Sverigetopplistan)	14
Swiss Albums (Schweizer Hitparade)	4
UK Albums (Official Charts)	1
UK R&B Albums (Official Charts)	1
US Billboard 200	11
US Top R&B/Hip-Hop Albums (Billboard)	9

Chart (2003)	Peak position
Dutch Albums (Album Top 100)	13

=== Year-end charts ===
Year-end chart performance for The Id
Chart (2001)	Position
Australian Albums (ARIA)	77
Canadian Albums (Nielsen SoundScan)	124
Canadian R&B Albums (Nielsen SoundScan)	30
Danish Albums (Hitlisten)	91
European Albums (Music & Media)	54
Swiss Albums (Schweizer Hitparade)	64
UK Albums (OCC)	123

Chart (2002)	Position
Canadian R&B Albums (Nielsen SoundScan)	124

== Certifications ==
Region	Certification	Certified units/sales
Australia (ARIA)	Gold	35,000^{^}
Canada (Music Canada)	Platinum	100,000^{^}
New Zealand (RMNZ)	Gold	7,500^{^}
Switzerland (IFPI Switzerland)	Gold	20,000^{^}
United Kingdom (BPI)	Gold	100,000^{^}
United States (RIAA)	Gold	593,000^{^}
^{^} Shipments figures based on certification alone.

== Release history ==
Region	Date	Label	Ref.
Germany	September 17, 2001	Sony	
United States	September 18, 2001	Epic	
Japan	September 19, 2001	Sony	
