= Love Is Gonna Get You (song) =

Single by Macy Gray

from the album The Very Best of Macy Gray
- Released: August 16, 2004
- Recorded: 2003
- Genre: Soul; R&B; disco
- Length: 3:00
- Label: Epic
- Songwriter(s): Macy Gray; Mike Elizondo
- Producer(s): Mike Elizondo

Macy Gray singles chronology
"When I See You" (2003)	"Love Is Gonna Get You" (2004)	"Finally Made Me Happy" (2007)

Audio
- "Love Is Gonna Get You" on YouTube

"Love Is Gonna Get You" (also known as "Love Is Gonna Get Ya") is a song by American singer and songwriter Macy Gray, released as the only single from her greatest hits album, The Very Best of Macy Gray (2004).

"Love Is Gonna Get You" was only released as a promotional single in the United Kingdom. Nevertheless, the song was given a full commercial release in Austria and the Netherlands with a live version of "I Try" as its B-side. The song was Gray's final release for Epic Records, and no music video was produced to back the single release. The song's official UK release date was originally set for August 16, 2004, however, the release was Gray's second consecutive single release to be canceled there.

The song was used as the opening theme song for the 2003 NBC series Miss Match.

== Track listing ==
- CD single
1. "Love Is Gonna Get You" – 3:00
2. "I Try" (The Jo Whiley Radio 1 Session) – 4:15

== Charts ==
Chart (2004)	Peak position
Croatia (HRT)	6
Netherlands (Single Top 100)	95
