= Victor Indrizzo =

American session musician (born 1967)

- Born: 23 September 1967 (age 57); Long Island, New York
- Genres: Rock; pop; alternative rock; country
- Occupations: Musician; producer
- Instruments: Drums; guitar; piano; bass guitar; vocals
- Years active: 1989–present

Victor Indrizzo (born September 23, 1967) is an American session musician, primarily known for playing the drums, as well as a songwriter and producer.

Indrizzo was born in Freeport, Long Island, New York. He has toured, recorded and worked with a variety of artists, including Samiam, A'Me Lorain (to whom he was married), Scott Weiland, Chris Cornell, Queens of the Stone Age, Beck, Macy Gray, Daniel Lanois, Lizzo (Grammy for Record Of The Year for "About Damn Time"), Willie Nelson, Avril Lavigne, Dave Gahan (and Depeche Mode), Gwen Stefani, Gnarls Barkley, Redd Kross, The Vines and others. Most recently he has collaborated with Seal, Colbie Caillat, Brandon Flowers, Daniel Powter, Café Tacuba, Juanes, Alanis Morissette, Elisa, Tegan and Sara and Paul Stanley.

Indrizzo has also worked on the soundtracks to many movies, including 40 Year Old Virgin, Get Him to the Greek, Horrible Bosses, Crazy, Stupid, Love, Diary of a Wimpy Kid, Get Well Soon, Spider-Man, Charlie's Angels, Superbad and The Matrix Reloaded.

== Partial list of projects ==
Year	Name	Artist	Credit(s)
1990	Duck and Cover	Various Artists	Drums
1990	Melting Plot	Various Artists	Percussion, Drums, Vocals, Rap
1990	Mono! Stereo	Tater Totz	Drums
1990	Starring in...Standing in a Monkey Sea	A'Me Lorain & The Family Affair	Guitar, Drums, Vocals
1990	Third Eye	Redd Kross	Drums, Vocals
1992	Tannis Root Presents: Freedom of Choice	Various Artists	Drums
1993	Magic & Madness	Circus of Power	Drums
1994	Clumsy	Samiam	Drums
1994	All of Us	I Love You	Organ (Hammond)
1995	Tank Girl – Original Soundtrack	Various Artists	Drums
1995	Working Class Hero: A Tribute to John Lennon	Various Artists	Drums
1995	It's OK!	It's OK!	Drums
1996	Gamma Ray	Queens of the Stone Age	Drums
1997	Ultra	Depeche Mode	Percussion
1997	How High the Moon: Live at the Viper Room	Masters of Reality	Drums, Vocals
1997	Kyuss / Queens of the Stone Age	Queens of the Stone Age	Drums
1998	12 Bar Blues	Scott Weiland	Guitar (Acoustic), Guitar, Percussion, Piano, Drums, Guitar (Electric), Keyboards, Mellophonium, String Arrangements, Hi Hat
1998	Teatro	Willie Nelson	Percussion, Drums
1999	Against the View	Fine	?
1999	Euphoria Morning	Chris Cornell	Drums
1999	Vagabond Ways	Marianne Faithfull	Guitar
1999	Welcome to the Western Lodge	Masters of Reality	Drums
2000	MP4 (Days Since a Lost Time Accident)	Michael Penn	Drums (Snare)
2001	The Id	Macy Gray	Drums
2001	Poses	Rufus Wainwright	Drums
2001	"Sweet Baby"	Macy Gray	Drums
2002	Dirty Child	Rosey	Percussion, Drums
2002	Highly Evolved	The Vines	Drums
2002	Largo	Brad Mehldau	Percussion, Drums
2002	OK Go	OK Go	Musician
2002	Poses [US Bonus Track]	Rufus Wainwright	Drums
2003	Let Go	Avril Lavigne	Drums
2003	Amorama	Érica García	Bateria
2003	Falling Uphill [Japan Bonus Tracks]	Lillix	Drums
2003	Falling Uphill	Lillix	Drums
2003	Liz Phair [Clean]	Liz Phair	Drums
2003	Liz Phair	Liz Phair	Drums
2003	Paper Monsters [CD & DVD]	Dave Gahan	Drums
2003	Paper Monsters	Dave Gahan	Drums
2003	Queen of Pain	Devil Doll	Organ
2003	Shanghai Knights (Original Soundtrack)	Various Artists	Drums
2003	Stacie Orrico [Japan Bonus Tracks]	Stacie Orrico	Drums
2003	Stacie Orrico	Stacie Orrico	Drums
2003	The Trouble with Being Myself [Japan Bonus Tracks]	Macy Gray	Guitar, Drums, Guitar Loops
2003	The Trouble with Being Myself	Macy Gray	Guitar, Drums, Guitar Loops
2004	Alive & Amplified	The Mooney Suzuki	Percussion
2004	The Battle for Everything [Bonus CD]	Five for Fighting	Drums
2004	The Battle for Everything [Bonus Track]	Five for Fighting	Drums
2004	The Battle for Everything	Five for Fighting	Drums, Musician
2004	Give It All Away	Ben Jelen	Drums
2004	Give Us Barabbas	Masters of Reality	Drums
2004	Labyrinth	Juno Reactor	Drums
2004	Live Monsters	Dave Gahan	Drums
2004	Mi Sangre	Juanes	Bateria
2004	The Very Best of Macy Gray	Macy Gray	Drums
2004	"Wonderful People"	Mari Iijima	Drums
2005	712 [Bonus Tracks]	Shonen Knife	Drums
2005	The Battle for Everything [DualDisc]	Five for Fighting	Drums
2005	Belladonna	Daniel Lanois	Musician
2005	Darcy's Wild Life (Soundtrack)	Various Artists	Drums
2005	Fijación Oral, Vol. 1 [DualDisc]	Shakira	Percussion, Bateria
2005	Fijación Oral, Vol. 1	Shakira	Percussion, Bateria
2005	The Forgotten Arm	Aimee Mann	Percussion, Drums, Cowbell
2005	Highly Evolved / Winning Days	The Vines	Drums
2005	"Inside Your Heaven"	Bo Bice	Drums
2005	Mi Sangre [Tour Edition]	Juanes	Bateria
2005	Oral Fixation, Vol. 2	Shakira	Drums
2006	Bat Out of Hell III: The Monster Is Loose [CD/DVD]	Meat Loaf	Drums
2006	Bat Out of Hell III: The Monster Is Loose	Meat Loaf	Drums
2006	Highway 10 Blues	Cordovan	Drums
2006	Huecco	Huecco	Bateria
2006	"It's All Coming Back to Me Now"	Meat Loaf	Drums
2006	Live to Win	Paul Stanley	Drums
2006	Mi Sangre [Asia Bonus Tracks]	Juanes	Bateria
2006	Oral Fixation, Vol. 2 [Bonus Track]	Shakira	Drums
2006	Oral Fixation, Vols. 1–2 [CD/DVD]	Shakira	Percussion, Keyboards, Bateria
2006	Soundtrack to Your Life [Bonus Tracks]	Ashley Parker Angel	Drums
2006	Soundtrack to Your Life	Ashley Parker Angel	Drums
2006	Stacie Orrico [Korean Tour Edition]	Stacie Orrico	Drums
2006	Thumbelina's One Night Stand [Bonus Tracks]	Melissa McClelland	Drums
2006	What's Mine Is Yours [Bonus Tracks]	Eliot Morris	Percussion, Drums
2006	What's Mine Is Yours	Eliot Morris	Percussion, Drums
2007	Big [Bonus Tracks]	Macy Gray	Drums
2007	Big	Macy Gray	Drums
2007	Coco	Colbie Caillat	Drums
2007	Cry Over Me	Meat Loaf	Drums
2007	Mi Tiempo	Chayanne	Drums
2007	Palms & Runes, Tarot & Tea: A Michael Penn Collection	Michael Penn	Drums
2007	Songbird: Rare Tracks & Forgotten Gems	Emmylou Harris	Drums
2007	Superbad – Original Motion Picture Soundtrack	Various Artists	Drums
2007	Who You Are	Cary Brothers	Drums
2007	Songs from the Edge	Dirty Harry	Drums
2007	The Underdogs	Jen Foster	Drums
2008	Damage of This Day	Kevin Elliot & the Broken	Drums
2008	The Day Is Brave	Brendan James	Percussion, Drums
2008	The Elephant in the Room	Arden Kaywin	Drums
2008	Forgetting Sarah Marshall: Original Soundtrack	Various Artists	Percussion, Drums
2008	"Gold"	Mikal Blue	Drums
2008	Jordin Sparks [Bonus Track]	Jordin Sparks	Drums
2008	Lenka	Lenka	Drums
2008	No Air [3 Tracks]	Jordin Sparks	Drums, Additional Music
2008	"No Air"	Jordin Sparks	Drums, Additional Music
2008	One Hell of a Ride [Box Set]	Willie Nelson	Drums
2008	Pass It Around [Australia Bonus Track]	Donavon Frankenreiter	Drums
2008	Pass It Around [Bonus Track]	Donavon Frankenreiter	Drums
2008	Pass It Around	Donavon Frankenreiter	Drums
2008	Simple Times	Joshua Radin	Drums
2008	Songs for Tibet [Touch & Go]	Various Artists	Shaker
2008	Stray Age	Daniel Martin Moore	Drums
2008	Thrivemix, Vol. 5	Various Artists	Drums
2008	Under the Radar	Daniel Powter	Drums
2008	La Vida... Es Un Ratico (En Vivo)	Juanes	Drums
2009	The Matrix	The Matrix	Drums
2009	Songs from the Edge	Dirty Harry	Drums
2009	The Underdogs	Jen Foster	Drums
2009	Discovery	Chris Catena	Drums
2010	Unbroken	Katharine McPhee	Drums
2010	Flamingo	Brandon Flowers	Drums
2010	Kaleidoscope Heart	Sara Bareilles	Drums, Percussion
2010	Brendan James	Brendan James	Drums, Percussion
2010	Get Him to the Greek: Soundtrack	Infant Sorrow	Drums
2010	100 Miles from Memphis	Sheryl Crow	Percussion, Drums
2010	Merry Christmas II You	Mariah Carey	Drums
2010	Ms. Vocalist	Debbie Gibson	Percussion, Drums
2010	P.A.R.C.E.	Juanes	Drums
2010	Best of Me	Daniel Powter	Drums
2011	Entre la Ciudad y el Mar	Gustavo Galindo	Bateria
2011	American Idol 10th Anniversary – The Hits, Vol. 1	Various Artists	Drums
2011	Augustana	Augustana	Drums
2011	Soldaat van Oranje: De Musical	Soldaat van Oranje Cast	Drums
2011	Lovestrong	Christina Perri	Percussion
2011	Gravity Happens	Kate Voegele	Percussion, Drums, Tambo Drums
2011	Andy Grammer	Andy Grammer	Percussion, Drums
2011	To Know I'm OK	Terra Naomi	Drums
2011	All of You	Colbie Caillat	Drums
2011	Electro de Perfecto	Mike Viola	Drums
2012	American Made	BoDeans	Drums, Percussion
2016	On	Elisa	Drums

== Collaborations ==
- Euphoria Morning – Chris Cornell (1999)
- Poses – Rufus Wainwright (2001)
- The Id – Macy Gray (2001)
- Let Go – Avril Lavigne (2002)
- Paper Monsters – Dave Gahan (2003)
- The Trouble with Being Myself – Macy Gray (2003)
- Mi Sangre – Juanes (2004)
- Fijación Oral, Vol. 1 – Shakira (2005)
- The Forgotten Arm – Aimee Mann (2005)
- Oral Fixation, Vol. 2 – Shakira (2005)
- La Vida... Es Un Ratico – Juanes (2007)
- Big – Macy Gray (2007)
- Under the Radar – Daniel Powter (2008)
- Give Up the Ghost – Brandi Carlile (2009)
- Cradlesong – Rob Thomas (2009)
- Flamingo – Brandon Flowers (2010)
- 100 Miles from Memphis – Sheryl Crow (2010)
- P.A.R.C.E. – Juanes (2010)
- Kaleidoscope Heart – Sara Bareilles (2010)
- Ms. Vocalist – Debbie Gibson (2010)
- Fearless Love – Melissa Etheridge (2010)
- Soul 2 – Seal (2011)
- Havoc and Bright Lights – Alanis Morissette (2012)
- Turn On the Lights – Daniel Powter (2012)
- Child of the Universe – Delta Goodrem (2012)
- Resurrection – Anastacia (2014)
- The Way – Macy Gray (2014)
- The Great Unknown – Rob Thomas (2015)
- Something Worth Saving – Gavin DeGraw (2016)
- The Medicine Show – Melissa Etheridge (2019)
