= Sexual revolution (disambiguation) =

The Sexual revolution was a social movement that challenged traditional codes of behavior related to sexuality and interpersonal relationships.

Sexual revolution may also refer to:

- Sexual revolution in 1960s United States
- "Sexual Revolution" (song)", 2001 Macy Gray song
- "Sexual Revolution" (Roger Waters song), from the 1984 album The Pros and Cons of Hitch Hiking
- "Sexual Revolution", a song by Army of Lovers from the 1994 album Glory, Glamour and Gold
