= 2000 MTV Video Music Awards =

Award ceremony

- Date: Thursday, September 7, 2000
- Location: Radio City Music Hall, New York City, New York
- Country: United States
- Hosted by: Marlon Wayans and Shawn Wayans

Highlights
- Most awards: *NSYNC, Eminem & Red Hot Chili Peppers (3)
- Most nominations: Eminem (7)
- Website: http://www.mtv.com/ontv/vma/past-vmas/2000/

Television/radio coverage
- Network: MTV
- Produced by: Alex Coletti; Salli Frattini; Dave Sirulnick
- Directed by: Bruce Gowers

The 2000 MTV Video Music Awards (stylized as MTV Video_Music_Awards vma.00) aired live on September 7, 2000, honoring the best music videos from June 12, 1999, to June 9, 2000. The show was hosted by Marlon and Shawn Wayans at Radio City Music Hall in New York City.

In the 2000 show Tim Commerford of Rage Against the Machine climbed a piece of set scaffolding and refusing to come down after his band lost the award for Best Rock Video to Limp Bizkit. The show went to commercial while security removed Commerford, who was later arrested for disorderly conduct.

Janet Jackson opened the show with her hit "Doesn't Really Matter". Britney Spears performed her hit single "Oops!...I Did It Again" which went on to become one of the VMA's most iconic and controversial performances, mostly due to her skin-colored performance attire. *NSYNC also performed their hit single "Bye Bye Bye". Bizkit vocalist Fred Durst later joined Christina Aguilera onstage as a surprise guest during her performance of "Come On Over Baby (All I Want Is You)".

For the second year in a row DMX did not show up for dress rehearsals; as a result, Nelly's performance, originally scheduled for the pre-show, was promoted to the main event. Other highlights included Eminem performing amidst an army of "Slim Shady" lookalikes and a humorous montage dedicated to past VMA winners who had failed to repeat their previous success.

This marked Aaliyah's final appearance at the VMA awards before her death a year later. That night she received her two only VMA awards for Best Female Video and Best Video from a Film for her song "Try Again."

== Background ==
Nominees were announced at a news conference held on July 25 in MTV's Times Square studio. At the same news conference, Shawn and Marlon Wayans were announced as hosts, while *NSYNC and Rage Against the Machine were announced as performers. Janet Jackson was announced as a performer on August 3. Britney Spears and Eminem were announced as performers on August 7. DMX, Blink-182, and the Red Hot Chili Peppers were announced as performers on August 15. Christina Aguilera and Sisqó were announced as performers on August 28.

The ceremony broadcast was preceded by the 2000 MTV Video Music Awards Opening Act. Hosted by Kurt Loder and Serena Altschul with reports from Chris Connelly, Brian McFayden, John Norris, and Iann Robinson, the broadcast featured red carpet interviews, pre-taped features on the rise of songs and music videos about butts (such as "Thong Song" and "Back That Thang Up"), Eminem's career over the past year, and music feuds (presented by Mick Foley)

== Performances ==
List of musical performances
Artist(s)	Song(s)
Pre-show
Papa Roach	"Last Resort" "Broken Home"
Main show
Janet Jackson	"Doesn't Really Matter"
Rage Against the Machine	"Testify"
Sisqó	"Incomplete" (featuring Dru Hill) "Thong Song"
Britney Spears	"(I Can't Get No) Satisfaction" "Oops!... I Did It Again"
Eminem	"The Real Slim Shady" "The Way I Am"
Red Hot Chili Peppers	"Californication"
*NSYNC	"This I Promise You" "Bye, Bye, Bye" "It's Gonna Be Me"
Nelly	"Country Grammar"
Christina Aguilera	"Genie in a Bottle" "Come On Over Baby (All I Want Is You)" "Livin' It Up" (featuring Fred Durst)
Blink-182	"All the Small Things"

== Presenters ==
=== Pre-show ===
- Kurt Loder and Serena Altschul – announced the winners of the professional categories, Breakthrough Video and Best Video from a Film

=== Main show ===
- Renée Zellweger – introduced Janet Jackson
- Dr. Dre and Steven Tyler – presented Best Group Video
- Kid Rock and The Rock – presented Best Dance Video
- U2 (Bono and Larry Mullen, Jr.) – introduced Rage Against the Machine
- Jimmy Fallon – appeared in a skit onstage about Viewer's Choice voting procedures
- Jakob Dylan and Kate Hudson – presented Best New Artist in a Video
- Venus and Serena Williams (via satellite) – introduced Sisqó
- Ricky Martin – presented Best Female Video
- Destiny's Child and Wyclef Jean – presented Best Male Video
- Carson Daly – introduced Napster creator Shawn Fanning and introduced Britney Spears with him
- Lenny Kravitz and Gisele Bündchen – presented Best Hip-Hop Video
- Method Man & Redman – appeared in a vignette about Viewer's Choice voting procedures
- LL Cool J and Macy Gray – presented Best Pop Video
- Jim Carrey – introduced Eminem
- Chris Rock and Lance Crouther (as "Pootie Tang") – presented the Video Vanguard Award and introduced the Red Hot Chili Peppers
- Moby and P!nk – presented Best Rap Video
- Aaliyah and Ananda Lewis – introduced NSYNC
- D'Angelo and Jennifer Lopez – presented Best Rock Video
- Toni Braxton and 98 Degrees – introduced the International Viewer's Choice Award winners
- Carson Daly - explained the Tim Commerford incident to viewers, interviewed Fred Durst and Kid Rock, and introduced Mark Wahlberg
- Mark Wahlberg – introduced Nelly
- Sting and Eve – presented Best R&B Video
- Ben Stiller and Robert De Niro – presented Best Direction in a Video
- Chyna and Richard Hatch – introduced Christina Aguilera
- Lil' Kim and Vincent Pastore – presented Viewer's Choice
- Christina Aguilera and Britney Spears – introduced Whitney Houston
- Whitney Houston and Bobby Brown – presented Video of the Year
- Lars Ulrich – introduced Blink-182 (and appeared in a taped skit about Napster earlier)

== Winners and nominees ==
Winners are in bold text.

Video of the Year	Best Male Video
**Eminem – "The Real Slim Shady"**; Blink-182 – "All the Small Things"; D'Angelo – "Untitled (How Does It Feel)"; *NSYNC – "Bye Bye Bye"; Red Hot Chili Peppers – "Californication"	**Eminem – "The Real Slim Shady"**; D'Angelo – "Untitled (How Does It Feel)"; Kid Rock – "Cowboy"; Ricky Martin – "Shake Your Bon-Bon"; Moby – "Natural Blues"
Best Female Video	Best Group Video
**Aaliyah – "Try Again"**; Christina Aguilera – "What a Girl Wants"; Toni Braxton – "He Wasn't Man Enough"; Macy Gray – "I Try"; Britney Spears – "Oops!...I Did It Again"	**Blink-182 – "All the Small Things"**; Destiny's Child – "Say My Name"; Foo Fighters – "Learn to Fly"; *NSYNC – "Bye Bye Bye"; Red Hot Chili Peppers – "Californication"
Best New Artist in a Video	Best Pop Video
**Macy Gray – "I Try"**; Christina Aguilera – "What a Girl Wants"; Papa Roach – "Last Resort"; Pink – "There You Go"; Sisqó – "Thong Song"	***NSYNC – "Bye Bye Bye"**; Christina Aguilera – "What a Girl Wants"; Blink-182 – "All the Small Things"; Destiny's Child – "Say My Name"; Britney Spears – "Oops!...I Did It Again"
Best Rock Video	Best R&B Video
**Limp Bizkit – "Break Stuff"**; Creed – "Higher"; Kid Rock – "Cowboy"; Korn – "Falling Away from Me"; Metallica – "I Disappear"; Rage Against the Machine – "Sleep Now in the Fire"	**Destiny's Child – "Say My Name"**; Toni Braxton – "He Wasn't Man Enough"; D'Angelo – "Untitled (How Does It Feel)"; Brian McKnight – "Back at One"
Best Rap Video	Best Hip-Hop Video
**Dr. Dre (featuring Eminem) – "Forgot About Dre"**; DMX – "Party Up"; Eminem – "The Real Slim Shady"; Eve (featuring Faith Evans) – "Love Is Blind"; Jay-Z (featuring UGK) – "Big Pimpin'"	**Sisqó – "Thong Song"**; Lauryn Hill – "Everything Is Everything"; Juvenile – "Back That Thang Up"; Limp Bizkit (featuring Method Man) – "N 2 Gether Now"; Q-Tip – "Vivrant Thing"
Best Dance Video	Best Video from a Film
**Jennifer Lopez – "Waiting for Tonight"**; Ricky Martin – "Shake Your Bon-Bon"; *NSYNC – "Bye Bye Bye"; Sisqó – "Thong Song"; Britney Spears – "(You Drive Me) Crazy"	**Aaliyah – "Try Again" (from Romeo Must Die)**; Aimee Mann – "Save Me" (from Magnolia); Metallica – "I Disappear" (from Mission: Impossible 2); R.E.M. – "The Great Beyond" (from Man on the Moon); Sisqó (featuring Foxy Brown) – "Thong Song (remix)" (from Nutty Professor II: The Klumps)
Breakthrough Video	Best Direction in a Video
**Björk – "All Is Full of Love"**; Blur – "Coffee & TV"; The Chemical Brothers – "Let Forever Be"; Nine Inch Nails – "Into the Void"; Supergrass – "Pumping on Your Stereo"	**Red Hot Chili Peppers – "Californication" (Directors: Jonathan Dayton and Valerie Faris)**; D'Angelo – "Untitled (How Does It Feel)" (Directors: Paul Hunter and Dominique Trenier); Eminem – "The Real Slim Shady" (Directors: Dr. Dre and Phillip Atwell); Foo Fighters – "Learn to Fly" (Director: Jesse Peretz); Lauryn Hill – "Everything Is Everything" (Director: Sanji)
Best Choreography in a Video	Best Special Effects in a Video
***NSYNC – "Bye Bye Bye" (Choreographer: Darrin Henson)**; Aaliyah – "Try Again" (Choreographer: Fatima Robinson); Christina Aguilera – "What a Girl Wants" (Choreographer: Tina Landon); Jennifer Lopez – "Waiting for Tonight" (Choreographer: Tina Landon); Alanis Morissette – "So Pure" (Choreographers: Kevin O'Day and Anne White)	**Björk – "All Is Full of Love" (Special Effects: Glassworks)**; Lauryn Hill – "Everything Is Everything" (Special Effects: Method Studios); Metallica – "I Disappear" (Special Effects: Asylum Visual Effects); Red Hot Chili Peppers – "Californication" (Special Effects: Pixel Envy); Supergrass – "Pumping on Your Stereo" (Special Effects: Jim Henson's Creature Shop)
Best Art Direction in a Video	Best Editing in a Video
**Red Hot Chili Peppers – "Californication" (Art Director: Colin Strause)**; Filter – "Take a Picture" (Art Director: Cara Yoshimoto); Macy Gray – "Do Something" (Art Director: Nigel Phelps); Supergrass – "Pumping on Your Stereo" (Art Director: Garth Jennings)	**Aimee Mann – "Save Me" (Editor: Dylan Tichenor)**; Blaque – "I Do" (Editor: Chris Hafner); Eminem – "The Real Slim Shady" (Editor: Dan Lebental); Metallica – "I Disappear" (Editor: Nathan Cox); R.E.M. – "The Great Beyond" (Editor: Igor Kovalik)
Best Cinematography in a Video	Viewer's Choice
**Macy Gray – "Do Something" (Director of Photography: Jeff Cronenweth)**; Filter – "Take a Picture" (Director of Photography: Daniel Pearl); Madonna – "American Pie" (Director of Photography: John Mathieson); Metallica – "I Disappear" (Director of Photography: David Rudd); Stone Temple Pilots – "Sour Girl" (Director of Photography: Martin Coppen)	***NSYNC – "Bye Bye Bye"**; Christina Aguilera – "What a Girl Wants"; Eminem – "The Real Slim Shady"; Sisqó – "Thong Song"; Britney Spears – "Oops!...I Did It Again"
International Viewer's Choice: MTV Brasil	International Viewer's Choice: MTV India (Hindi film category)
**O Rappa – "A Minha Alma (A Paz Que Eu Não Quero)"**; Capital Inicial – "Eu Vou Estar"; Charlie Brown Jr. – "Confisco"; Engenheiros do Hawaii – "Negro Amor"; Gabriel o Pensador and Lulu Santos – "Astronauta"; Los Hermanos – "Anna Júlia"; Los Hermanos – "Primavera"; Maurício Manieri – "Bem Querer"; Daniela Mercury – "Ilê Pérola Negra"; Natiruts – "O Carcará e a Rosa"; Pato Fu – "Depois"; Penélope – "Holiday"; Raimundos – "A Mais Pedida"; Raimundos – "Me Lambe"; Raimundos – "Pompem"; O Rappa – "Me Deixa"; Rumbora – "Skaô"; Sandy & Junior – "Imortal"; Titãs – "Aluga-se"; Titãs – "Pelados em Santos"	**Udit Narayan and Alka Yagnik – "Kaho Na Pyar Hai"**; Asha Bhosle – "Rang De"; Suresh Peters and Mano – "Sailaru"; Kumar Sanu and Kavita Krishnamurthy – "Aankhon Ki Gustakiyan"; Anuradha Sriram, Sujatha, Sonu Nigam and A.R. Rahman – "Ishq Bina"
International Viewer's Choice: MTV India (Hindi pop category)	International Viewer's Choice: MTV Korea
**Falguni Pathak – "Maine Payal Hai Chhankai"**; Euphoria – "Mai Re"; Instant Karma – "Bahon Mein Chali Aao"; Sonu Nigam – "Tera Milna"; Shaan – "Tanha Dil"	**Clon – "First Love"**; Cho PD – "Fever"; Lee Jung-Hyun – "Come"; Lee Soo Young – "I Believe"; S.E.S. – "Love"
International Viewer's Choice: MTV Latin America (North)	International Viewer's Choice: MTV Latin America (South)
**Shakira – "Ojos Así"**; Jumbo – "Siento Que"; La Ley – "Aquí"; Mœnia – "Manto Estelar"; Aleks Syntek – "Tú Necesitas"	**Los Fabulosos Cadillacs – "La Vida"**; Gustavo Cerati – "Paseo Inmoral"; Illya Kuryaki and the Valderramas – "Coolo"; Shakira – "Ojos Así"; Diego Torres – "Donde Van"
International Viewer's Choice: MTV Mandarin	International Viewer's Choice: MTV Russia
**David Tao – "Find Myself"**; Cheer Chen – "Still Be Lonely"; Kelly Chen – "Love You Love Me"; Ho Xiang Tin – "The Tears for You"; David Huang – "Love Stopped Since Last Night"; May Lan – "Running Wild"; Faith Yang – "Hold Still"	**Detsl – "Vecherinka"**; Chicherina – "Zhara"; Mumiy Troll – "Bez Obmana"
International Viewer's Choice: MTV Southeast Asia	
**Ahmad Dhani and Andra Ramadhan – "Kuldesak"**; Bazoo – "Pee Fa Party"; Jason Lo – "Evening News"; Truefaith – "(Awit Para) Sa Kanya"
Video Vanguard Award
**Red Hot Chili Peppers**

== Artists with multiple wins and nominations ==
Artists who received multiple awards
Wins	Artist
3	Eminem
3	*NSYNC
3	Red Hot Chili Peppers
2	Aaliyah
2	Björk
2	Macy Gray

Artists who received multiple nominations
Nominations	Artist
7	Eminem
6	*NSYNC
5	Christina Aguilera
5	Metallica
5	Red Hot Chili Peppers
5	Sisqó
4	Britney Spears
4	D'Angelo
4	Macy Gray
3	Aaliyah
3	Blink-182
3	Destiny's Child
3	Lauryn Hill
3	Raimundos
3	Supergrass
2	Aimee Mann
2	Björk
2	Dr. Dre
2	Filter
2	Foo Fighters
2	Jennifer Lopez
2	Kid Rock
2	Limp Bizkit
2	Los Hermanos
2	O Rappa
2	Ricky Martin
2	R.E.M.
2	Shakira
2	Sonu Nigam
2	Titãs
2	Toni Braxton

== Music Videos with multiple wins and nominations ==
Music Videos that received multiple awards
Wins	Artist	Music Video
3	*NSYNC	"Bye Bye Bye"
2	Aaliyah	"Try Again"
2	Björk	"All Is Full of Love"
2	Eminem	"The Real Slim Shady"
2	Red Hot Chili Peppers	"Californication"

Music Videos that received multiple nominations
Nominations	Artist	Music Video
6	Eminem	"The Real Slim Shady"
6	*NSYNC	"Bye Bye Bye"
5	Christina Aguilera	"What a Girl Wants"
5	Metallica	"I Disappear"
5	Red Hot Chili Peppers	"Californication"
4	D'Angelo	"Untitled (How Does It Feel)"
4	Sisqó	"Thong Song"
3	Aaliyah	"Try Again"
3	Blink-182	"All the Small Things"
3	Britney Spears	"Oops!...I Did It Again"
3	Destiny's Child	"Say My Name"
3	Lauryn Hill	"Everything Is Everything"
3	Supergrass	"Pumping on Your Stereo"
2	Aimee Mann	"Save Me"
2	Björk	"All Is Full of Love"
2	Filter	"Take a Picture"
2	Foo Fighters	"Learn to Fly"
2	Jennifer Lopez	"Waiting for Tonight"
2	Kid Rock	"Cowboy"
2	Macy Gray	"Do Something"
2	Macy Gray	"I Try"
2	Ricky Martin	"Shake Your Bon-Bon"
2	R.E.M.	"The Great Beyond"
2	Shakira	"Ojos Así"
2	Toni Braxton	"He Wasn't Man Enough"

== See also ==
- 2000 MTV Europe Music Awards
