= The Trouble with Being Myself =

2003 studio album by Macy Gray

Studio album by Macy Gray
- Released: April 28, 2003
- Studio: Paramount (Hollywood, California); Ameraycan (North Hollywood, California); O'Henry Sound (Burbank, California); Royaltone (North Hollywood, California)
- Genre: R&B; soul; neo soul
- Length: 49:00
- Label: Epic
- Producer: Macy Gray

Macy Gray chronology
The Id (2001)	The Trouble with Being Myself (2003)	The Very Best of Macy Gray (2004)

Singles from The Trouble with Being Myself
- 1. "When I See You" Released: April 24, 2003

Professional ratings
Aggregate scores
Source	Rating
Metacritic	74/100
Review scores
Source	Rating
AllMusic	3/5 stars
The A.V. Club	Mixed
Entertainment Weekly	A−
The Guardian	3/5 stars
PopMatters	Positive
Rolling Stone	3/5 stars
Spin	B+
Uncut	3/5 stars
USA Today	3/4 stars
The Village Voice	B+

The Trouble with Being Myself is the third studio album by American singer and songwriter Macy Gray, released on April 28, 2003, by Epic Records. The album peaked at number 44 on the Billboard 200, and by February 2007, it had sold 134,000 copies in the United States. Despite not being a major commercial success, The Trouble with Being Myself received mostly positive reviews. The album spawned the single "When I See You".

== Track listing ==
All lyrics are written by Macy Gray.

No.	Title	Music	Producer(s)	Length
1.	"When I See You"	Jeremy Ruzumna; Victor Indrizzo; Justin Meldal-Johnsen	Gray; Dallas Austin^{[a]}; Dave Way^{[a]}; Darryl Swann^{[b]}	3:43
2.	"It Ain't the Money" (featuring Pharoahe Monch)	Gray; Ruzumna; Indrizzo; Meldal-Johnsen; Beck Hansen; Pharoahe Monch	Gray; DJ Kiilu Grand^{[a]}	4:07
3.	"She Ain't Right for You"	Ruzumna; Indrizzo; Meldal-Johnsen	Gray; Austin^{[a]}	4:12
4.	"Things That Made Me Change"	Andre Harris; Vidal Davis	Gray; Austin^{[a]}	4:29
5.	"Come Together"	Ruzumna; Indrizzo; Christopher Thomas	Gray; Austin^{[a]}; Way^{[a]}	4:35
6.	"She Don't Write Songs About You"	Gray; Swann; Ruzumna; Indrizzo; Meldal-Johnsen	Gray; Swann^{[a]}	4:39
7.	"Jesus for a Day"	Gray; Ruzumna; Meldal-Johnsen; Bobby Ross Avila; Izzy Avila	Gray; Austin^{[a]}; Swann^{[b]}	3:30
8.	"My Fondest Childhood Memories"	Gray; Ruzumna; Indrizzo; Meldal-Johnsen	Gray; Austin^{[a]}	3:36
9.	"Happiness"	Gray; Swann; Ruzumna; Indrizzo; Meldal-Johnsen	Gray; Swann^{[a]}	4:13
10.	"Speechless"	Ruzumna; Indrizzo; Meldal-Johnsen	Gray	4:06
11.	"Screamin'"	Gray	Gray; DJ Kiilu Grand^{[a]}	3:16
12.	"Every Now and Then"	Gray; Ruzumna; Indrizzo; Meldal-Johnsen	Gray; Austin^{[a]}	4:34

Japanese edition bonus tracks
No.	Title	Writer(s)	Length
13.	"Lie to Me"	Gray; Ruzumna; Indrizzo; Meldal-Johnsen	5:34
14.	"It's Love"	Gray; Ruzumna; Indrizzo; Meldal-Johnsen	5:40

Japanese reissue bonus track
No.	Title	Writer(s)	Length
15.	"We Will Rock You"	Brian May	3:03

=== Notes ===
- ^{^[a]} signifies a co-producer
- ^{^[b]} signifies a vocal producer

== Personnel ==
Credits adapted from the liner notes of The Trouble with Being Myself.

=== Musicians ===
- Macy Gray – vocals (all tracks); backing vocals (tracks 2, 6, 12)
- Dallas Austin – ARP, guitar (track 1); programming (tracks 3, 4); backing vocals (track 5)
- Scott Breadman – percussion (tracks 1, 2, 4–8, 12)
- DJ Kiilu Grand – programming (tracks 1, 2, 11); turntables (tracks 2, 9)
- Fanny Franklin – backing vocals (tracks 1, 3, 4)
- Victor Indrizzo – drums (tracks 1–9, 11, 12); guitar (tracks 1, 2, 9); guitar loops (track 5)
- Adam MacDougall – Moog (tracks 1, 3); Hammond (track 10); piano (track 11)
- Justin Meldal-Johnsen – bass (tracks 1–4, 6–9, 12); backing vocals (track 2)
- Audra Cunningham Nishita – backing vocals (track 1)
- Mark Ronson – guitar (tracks 1, 11); programming, turntables (track 2)
- Jeremy Ruzumna – Wurlitzer (tracks 1, 2, 5, 6, 8–10, 12); synthesizer (tracks 1, 2, 6, 9, 11); piano (tracks 1, 8, 10); turntables (track 2); programming (tracks 2, 5, 10); Moog (tracks 2, 6, 11); Hammond (tracks 3, 5, 8); clavinet (track 5); Chamberlin (track 9); organ (track 12)
- Sy Smith – backing vocals (tracks 1, 4, 5, 11); choir leader (track 9)
- Beck – backing vocals, guitar (track 2)
- Dawn Beckman – backing vocals (tracks 2, 5, 6, 11); choir leader (track 9)
- Pharoahe Monch – backing vocals (track 2)
- Chino Smith – backing vocals (tracks 2, 3, 5, 8)
- David Campbell – string arrangements (tracks 3, 7)
- Jinsoo Lim – guitar (track 3)
- Zac Rae – Rhodes (tracks 3, 4); Chamberlin (tracks 3, 4, 8–10); Farfisa (tracks 5, 8); piano (tracks 5, 10); clavinet, organ (track 7); Wurlitzer (tracks 7, 9); tack piano (track 8); synthesizer (track 10)
- Rick Shepherd – programming (tracks 3, 4, 6)
- Printz Board – flugelhorn (track 4); trumpet (tracks 4, 12)
- Arik Marshall – guitar (tracks 4, 5, 7, 8, 10)
- Tom "Tombone" Rawls – trombone (tracks 4, 12)
- Danielle Thomas – backing vocals (tracks 4, 5, 8)
- Tracy Wannomae – bass clarinet (track 4); saxophone (track 12)
- Marsha Ambrosius – backing vocals (track 5); opera vocals (track 8)
- Steve Baxter – trombone (tracks 5, 12)
- Charles Green – saxophone (tracks 5, 12)
- Mike Harris – trumpet (tracks 5, 12)
- Natalie Stewart – backing vocals (track 5)
- Chris Thomas – bass (track 5)
- Darryl Swann – programming (tracks 6, 9); guitar (track 9)
- Bobby Ross Avila – backing vocals (track 7); piano (tracks 7, 12)
- Traci Nelson – backing vocals (track 7)
- Dave Rolicke – saxophone, trombone (track 8)
- Ericka Yancey – backing vocals (track 8)
- Logan Duntzelman – kids choir (track 9)
- Aanisah Hinds – kids choir (track 9)
- Happy Hinds – kids choir (track 9)
- Tahmel Hinds – kids choir (track 9)
- Courtney Johnson – kids choir (track 9)
- Joia Johnson – kids choir (track 9)
- Chris Richardson – kids choir (track 9)
- Sonny Swann – kids choir (track 9)
- Marina Bambino – percussion (tracks 10, 12); backing vocals (tracks 11, 12)
- Herb Graham Jr. – drums (track 10)
- Lukas Haas – acoustic guitar, backing vocals (track 10)
- Dave Wilder – bass (track 10)
- Rama Duke – backing vocals (track 11)
- Mike Elizondo – bass (track 11)
- Esthero – backing vocals (track 11)
- Kam Talbert – backing vocals (track 11)
- Israel Avila – programming (track 12)

=== Technical ===
- Dallas Austin – co-production (tracks 1, 3–5, 7, 8, 12); executive production
- Dave Way – co-production (tracks 1, 5); recording, mixing, Pro Tools (all tracks)
- Darryl Swann – vocal production (tracks 1, 7); co-production (tracks 6, 9)
- Thom Russo – additional mixing (track 1); Pro Tools (all tracks)
- DJ Kiilu Grand – co-production (tracks 2, 11)
- Chris Wonzer – additional engineering (tracks 2, 11); engineering assistance (all tracks)
- Macy Gray – production
- Mike Melnick – additional engineering
- Neil Ward – additional engineering
- Tim Lauber – engineering assistance
- Christine Sirois – engineering assistance
- Ted Jensen – mastering

=== Artwork ===
- Hooshik – art direction, design
- David LaChapelle – photography

== Charts ==
Chart performance for The Trouble with Being Myself
Chart (2003)	Peak position
Australian Albums (ARIA)	23
Australian Urban Albums (ARIA)	5
Austrian Albums (Ö3 Austria)	27
Belgian Albums (Ultratop Flanders)	12
Belgian Albums (Ultratop Wallonia)	22
Canadian Albums (Nielsen SoundScan)	88
Danish Albums (Hitlisten)	34
Dutch Albums (Album Top 100)	18
European Albums (Music & Media)	25
Finnish Albums (Suomen virallinen lista)	19
French Albums (SNEP)	61
German Albums (Offizielle Top 100)	46
Irish Albums (IRMA)	40
Italian Albums (FIMI)	20
Japanese Albums (Oricon)	53
New Zealand Albums (RMNZ)	41
Polish Albums (ZPAV)	22
Scottish Albums (OCC)	22
Swiss Albums (Schweizer Hitparade)	10
UK Albums (OCC)	17
UK R&B Albums (OCC)	5
US Billboard 200	44
US Top R&B/Hip-Hop Albums (Billboard)	29

== Certifications and sales ==
Certifications and sales for The Trouble with Being Myself
Region	Certification	Certified units/sales
Australia (ARIA)	Gold	35,000^{^}
United Kingdom (BPI)	Silver	60,000^{^}
United States	—	134,000
^{^} Shipments figures based on certification alone.

== Release history ==
Release history for The Trouble with Being Myself
Region	Date	Edition	Label	Ref.
United Kingdom	April 28, 2003	Standard	Epic	
Japan	May 2, 2003	Standard	Sony	
United States	July 15, 2003	Standard	Epic	
Japan	September 10, 2003	Reissue	Sony	
