= Sweet Baby (Macy Gray song) =

2001 single by Macy Gray

Single by Macy Gray featuring Erykah Badu

from the album The Id
- B-side: "Better Where You Are"
- Released: August 27, 2001
- Studio: Various (Hollywood, Philadelphia, Chicago)
- Genre: Soul
- Length: 3:49
- Label: Epic
- Composer: Joe Solo
- Lyricist: Macy Gray
- Producers: Darryl Swann; Macy Gray

Macy Gray singles chronology
"Why Didn't You Call Me" (2000)	"Sweet Baby" (2001)	"Sexual Revolution" (2001)

Erykah Badu singles chronology
"Cleva" (2001)	"Sweet Baby" (2001)	"Love of My Life (An Ode to Hip-Hop)" (2002)

Music video
- "Sweet Baby" on YouTube

"Sweet Baby" is a song by American singer Macy Gray featuring American singer Erykah Badu, released as the lead single from Gray's second studio album, The Id (2001). The single was serviced to radio in July 2001 before being released physically in August. John Frusciante of Red Hot Chili Peppers provides the song's guitars while R&B musician Billy Preston plays the organ. The UK CD and cassette formats contains a previously unreleased track named "Better Where You Are" as a B-side.

"Sweet Baby" peaked at number 23 on the UK Singles Chart, becoming Gray's sixth top-40 single there. The single also reached number 12 in New Zealand, number 16 in Canada, number 18 in Italy, and number 39 in Australia, as well as number 24 on the Billboard Adult Top 40 chart in the United States.

== Track listings ==
- UK CD single
1. "Sweet Baby" (featuring Erykah Badu) – 3:48
2. "Sweet Baby" (8 Jam remix featuring Erykah Badu) – 5:46
3. "Better Where You Are" – 4:17
4. "Sweet Baby" (video)
- UK 12-inch single

A1. "Sweet Baby" (8 Jam remix featuring Erykah Badu) – 5:46
B1. "Hey Young World Part 2" (featuring Slick Rick) – 4:01
B2. "Sweet Baby" (featuring Erykah Badu) – 3:55

- UK cassette single
1. "Sweet Baby" (featuring Erykah Badu) – 3:48
2. "Sweet Baby" (8 Jam remix featuring Erykah Badu) – 5:46
3. "Better Where You Are" – 4:17
- European CD single
1. "Sweet Baby" (featuring Erykah Badu) – 3:48
2. "Better Where You Are" – 4:17
- Australian CD single
1. "Sweet Baby" (album version featuring Erykah Badu)
2. "Better Where You Are"
3. "Que Sera" (live from Wembley)
4. "If This Is Luv" (demo)
- Japanese CD single
1. "Sweet Baby" (featuring Erykah Badu)
2. "Que sera" (live from Brixton)

== Credits and personnel ==
Credits are taken from The Id album booklet.

Studios

- Recorded at various studios in Hollywood, Philadelphia, and Chicago
- Mixed at various studios in Hollywood and New York City
- Mastered at Sony Music Studios (New York City)

Personnel

- Macy Gray – lyrics, production
- Joe Solo – music
- Erykah Badu – guest vocals, vocal arrangement
- John Frusciante – guitar
- Dave Wilder – bass
- Zac Rae – piano, Chamberlin
- Billy Preston – organ
- Jeremy Ruzumna – organ
- Darren Johnson – Rhodes
- Keefus Ciancia – Farfisa
- Victor Indrizzo – drums
- Marina Bambino – percussion
- Charles Veal Jr. – string arrangement
- Rick Rubin – vocal arrangement
- Darryl Swann – production, engineering, programming
- Dave Way – mixing
- Thom Russo – Pro Tools engineering
- Vlado Meller – mastering

== Charts ==
=== Weekly charts ===
Chart (2001)	Peak position
Australia (ARIA)	39
Belgium (Ultratip Bubbling Under Flanders)	16
Belgium (Ultratip Bubbling Under Wallonia)	2
Canada (Nielsen SoundScan)	16
Europe (European Hot 100 Singles)	68
Ireland (IRMA)	43
Italy (FIMI)	18
Netherlands (Dutch Top 40)	40
Netherlands (Single Top 100)	80
New Zealand (Recorded Music NZ)	12
Romania (Romanian Top 100)	89
Scotland Singles (Official Charts)	23
Switzerland (Schweizer Hitparade)	36
UK Singles (Official Charts)	23
UK Hip Hop/R&B (Official Charts)	6
US Adult Pop Airplay (Billboard)	24

=== Year-end charts ===
Chart (2001)	Position
New Zealand (RIANZ)	49
US Adult Top 40 (Billboard)	88

== Release history ==
Region	Date	Format(s)	Label(s)	Ref.
United States	July 31, 2001	Contemporary hit radio	Epic	
Australia	August 27, 2001	CD	Epic	
United Kingdom	September 3, 2001	12-inch vinyl; CD; cassette	Epic	
Japan	September 12, 2001	CD	Epic	
