= When I See You =

2003 single by Macy Gray

Single by Macy Gray

from the album The Trouble with Being Myself
- B-side: "My Fondest Childhood Memories"; "Lie to Me"; "It's Love"
- Released: January 27, 2003
- Studio: Paramount (Hollywood, California); Ameraycan, Royaltone (North Hollywood, California); O'Henry Sound (Burbank, California)
- Length: 3:43
- Label: Epic
- Composer(s): Jeremy Ruzumna; Victor Indrizzo; Justin Meldal-Johnsen
- Lyricist(s): Macy Gray
- Producer(s): Macy Gray

Macy Gray singles chronology
"Request + Line" (2001)	"When I See You" (2003)	"Love Is Gonna Get You" (2004)

Music video
- "When I See You" on YouTube

"When I See You" is a song by American singer Macy Gray from her third studio album, The Trouble with Being Myself (2003). It was released on January 27, 2003, as the album's only single. The single was released on two CD formats in the UK that contain remixes by Bugz in the Attic along with two unreleased B-sides: "Lie to Me" and "It's Love".

"When I See You" peaked at number 26 in the United Kingdom and number 40 in Australia. In the United States, the song reached number 21 on the Adult Top 40 chart and number 23 on the Hot Digital Tracks chart.

== Track listings ==
- US 12-inch single

A1. "When I See You" (album version) – 3:43
A2. "When I See You" (Bugz in the Attic remix) – 6:32
B1. "My Fondest Childhood Memories" – 3:36

- UK CD1
1. "When I See You" – 3:43
2. "Lie to Me" – 5:32
3. "It's Love" – 5:31
- UK CD2
1. "When I See You" – 3:43
2. "When I See You" (Bugz in the Attic remix) – 5:37
3. "I Try" (Grand Style mix) – 4:57
4. "When I See You" (video version) – 3:43
- European CD single
1. "When I See You" – 3:43
2. "When I See You" (Bugz in the Attic remix) – 5:37
- European maxi-CD single
1. "When I See You" – 3:43
2. "Lie to Me" – 5:32
3. "It's Love" – 5:31
4. "When I See You" (Bugz in the Attic remix) – 5:37
5. "I Try" (Grand Style mix) – 4:57
- Australian CD single
1. "When I See You" – 3:43
2. "Lie to Me" – 5:32
3. "It's Love" – 5:31
4. "When I See You" (Bugz in the Attic remix) – 5:37

== Charts ==
=== Weekly charts ===
Chart (2003)	Peak position
Australia (ARIA)	34
Belgium (Ultratip Bubbling Under Flanders)	9
Croatia (HRT)	8
Europe (European Hot 100 Singles)	88
Italy (FIMI)	32
Netherlands (Dutch Top 40 Tipparade)	18
Netherlands (Single Top 100)	66
Scotland (OCC)	20
UK Singles (OCC)	26
UK Hip Hop/R&B (OCC)	7
US Adult Pop Airplay (Billboard)	21
US Hot Digital Tracks (Billboard)	23

=== Year-end charts ===
Chart (2003)	Position
US Adult Top 40 (Billboard)	92

== Release history ==
Region	Date	Format(s)	Label(s)	Ref.
United States	January 27, 2003	Hot adult contemporary; triple A radio	Epic	
Denmark	April 7, 2003	CD	Epic	
Australia	April 14, 2003	CD	Epic	
United Kingdom	April 21, 2003	CD	Epic	
