= Sexual Revolution (song) =

2001 single by Macy Gray

Single by Macy Gray

from the album The Id
- B-side: "Winter Wonderland"
- Released: November 26, 2001
- Studio: Paramount, Record Plant (Hollywood, California); The Studio, Remote Recording Services (Philadelphia, Pennsylvania); Aragon Ballroom (Chicago, Illinois)
- Length: 4:45
- Label: Epic
- Composers: Jeremy Ruzumna; David Wilder; Darryl Swann
- Lyricist: Macy Gray
- Producers: Darryl Swann; Macy Gray

Macy Gray singles chronology
"Sweet Baby" (2001)	"Sexual Revolution" (2001)	"Demons" (2001)

"Sexual Revolution" is a song by American singer Macy Gray from her second studio album, The Id (2001). It was released on November 26, 2001, as the album's second and final single. In the United Kingdom, "Sexual Revolution" became Gray's first single to miss the top 40 since "Do Something" in 1999, reaching number 45. The song's remixes had limited success in the United States, peaking at number four on the Billboard Dance Club Play chart. "Sexual Revolution" was released on two CD formats in the UK that contain remixes by Fatboy Slim and Miguel Migs. The single also contains Gray's version of the Christmas standard "Winter Wonderland".

== Track listings ==
- UK CD 1
1. "Sexual Revolution" (Radio Edit w/ Full Intro) – 4:02
2. "Sexual Revolution" (Miguel Migs Petalpusher Vocal) – 6:28
3. "Winter Wonderland" – 2:54
4. "Sexual Revolution" (music video)
- UK CD 2
1. "Sexual Revolution" (Album Version) – 4:45
2. "Sexual Revolution" (Norman Cook Full Version 119bmp) – 6:28
3. "Sexual Revolution" (Blaze Shelter Vocal Mix) – 7:25
- Australian CD single
1. "Sexual Revolution" (Album Version) – 4:45
2. "Sexual Revolution" (Morillo's Retro Club Mix) – 6:26
3. "Sexual Revolution" (Miguel Migs Petalpusher Vocal) – 6:39
4. "Sexual Revolution" (Norman Cook Radio Version @ 128bpm) – 3:33
5. "Sexual Revolution" (Blaze Shelter Early Dub) – 6:35

== Charts ==
Weekly chart performance for "Sexual Revolution"
Chart (2001–2002)	Peak position
Australia (ARIA)	68
Belgium (Ultratip Bubbling Under Flanders)	8
Belgium (Ultratip Bubbling Under Wallonia)	10
Europe (European Radio Top 50)	42
Ireland (IRMA)	50
Italy (FIMI)	33
Netherlands (Single Top 100)	89
Scottish Singles Sales (Official Charts)	52
Switzerland (Schweizer Hitparade)	91
UK Singles (Official Charts)	45
UK Hip Hop/R&B (Official Charts)	18
US Dance Club Songs (Billboard) Remixes	4

== Release history ==
Region	Date	Format(s)	Label(s)	Ref.
United Kingdom	November 26, 2001	12-inch vinyl; CD	Epic	
Australia	December 10, 2001	CD	Epic	
