= The Way (Macy Gray album) =

Studio album by Macy Gray
- Released: October 7, 2014
- Recorded: 2014
- Studio: Various
- Genre: R&B; soul; rock
- Label: Kobalt
- Producer: Royal Z; Jason Hill; Booker T. Jones

Macy Gray chronology
Talking Book (2012)	The Way (2014)	Stripped (2016)

The Way is the eighth full-length studio album by American recording artist Macy Gray, released on October 7, 2014, on Kobalt Records. The record follows her Stevie Wonder tribute album Talking Book. Gray supported the album with a North American and Australian tour. The album was molded around the idea that there is little music in today's mainstream for a mature audience.

== Critical reception ==
Professional ratings
Aggregate scores
Source	Rating
Metacritic	63/100
Review scores
Source	Rating
American Songwriter	3/5 stars
Allmusic	3/5 stars
musicOMH	3.5/5 stars
Renowned for Sound	4.5/5 stars

The Way received generally positive reviews from music critics. At Metacritic, which assigns a normalized rating out of 100 to reviews from mainstream critics, the album received an average score of 63, based on 5 reviews, which indicates "generally favorable reviews".

== Track listing ==
No.	Title	Producer(s)	Length
1.	"Stoned"	Royal Z	4:05
2.	"Bang Bang"	Jason Hill	3:43
3.	"Hands"	Royal Z	3:44
4.	"I Miss the Sex"	Jason Hill	3:52
5.	"First Time"	Booker T. Jones, Macy Gray, Royal Z (add.), Zoux (add.)	3:21
6.	"The Way"	Royal Z	4:01
7.	"Queen of the Big Hurt"	Jason Hill	5:18
8.	"Me with You"	Royal Z	4:52
9.	"Need You Now"	Royal Z	4:37
10.	"Life"	Royal Z	3:05

== Chart history ==
Chart (2014)	Peak position
Belgian Albums (Ultratop Flanders)	164
Belgian Albums (Ultratop Wallonia)	198
UK R&B Albums (OCC)	28
US Top R&B Albums (Billboard)	19
US Top R&B/Hip-Hop Albums (Billboard)	33
