= Do Something (Macy Gray song) =

1999 single by Macy Gray

Single by Macy Gray

from the album On How Life Is
- B-side: "Rather Hazy"
- Released: June 21, 1999
- Studio: Paramount, Sunset Sound, A&M (Hollywood, California)
- Length: 4:59
- Label: Epic
- Composers: Patrick Brown; Raymon Murray; Rico Wade; Cameron Gipp; Thomas Burton; André Benjamin; Antwan Patton; Greg Mays; Darryl Barnes; Jeremy Ruzumna; Darryl Swann; Robert Barnett; Dion Derek Murdock; George Clinton Jr.; Garry Shider; Bernard Worrell
- Lyricist: Macy Gray
- Producer: Andrew Slater

Macy Gray singles chronology
"Do Something" (1999)	"I Try" (1999)

Music video
- "Do Something" on YouTube

"Do Something" is a song by American singer Macy Gray from her debut studio album, On How Life Is (1999). It was released on June 21, 1999, as the album's lead single.

== Composition ==
The song samples OutKast's 1994 song "Git Up, Git Out" and Nice & Smooth's 1989 song "Funky for You".

== Release ==
"Do Something" was released as two CD singles and a cassette single in the United Kingdom on June 21, 1999. One CD single contains remixes of "Do Something", including collaborators such as Cee-Lo of Goodie Mob along with a non-album track, "Rather Hazy". "Do Something" peaked at number 51 on the UK Singles Chart, her lowest-charting single on the chart to date. In the United States, the song failed to enter the Billboard Hot 100 but peaked at number 43 on the Maxi-Singles Sales chart and number 63 on the Hot R&B Singles & Tracks chart.

== Music video ==
The music video for "Do Something" was directed by Mark Romanek, who had previously directed music videos for Fiona Apple and Michael Jackson. Released in 1999, the video depicts Gray in an all-white home, and surreal footage of people in the wilderness.

== Accolades ==
Gray was nominated at the 42nd Grammy Awards for Best Female R&B Vocal Performance. The music video was nominated for two awards at the 2000 MTV Video Music Awards. Nigel Phelps was nominated for Best Art Direction in a Video, losing to the Red Hot Chili Peppers' "Californication". It won the award for Best Cinematography in a Video.

== Track listing ==
- UK CD single
1. "Do Something" (Radio Edit) – 4:10
2. "Rather Hazy" – 3:10
3. "Do Something" (Organized Noize Mix featuring Cee-Lo) – 3:53

== Charts ==
Chart (1999–2000)	Peak position
Australia (ARIA)	103
Europe (European Radio Top 50)	32
Italy Airplay (Music & Media)	5
Netherlands (Dutch Top 40)	35
Netherlands (Single Top 100)	75
New Zealand (Recorded Music NZ)	32
Scotland Singles (OCC)	68
UK Singles (OCC)	51
UK Hip Hop/R&B (OCC)	9
US Dance Singles Sales (Billboard)	43
US Hot R&B/Hip-Hop Songs (Billboard)	63

== Release history ==
Region	Version	Date	Format(s)	Label(s)	Ref(s).
United States	"Do Something"	January 1999	Promotional 12-inch vinyl	Epic	
United Kingdom	"Do Something"	June 21, 1999	CD; cassette	Epic	
United States	"Do Something"	June 28, 1999	Urban radio	Epic	
United States	"Do Something"	June 29, 1999	Rhythmic contemporary radio	Epic	
Japan	"I Try" / "Do Something"	July 23, 1999	CD	Epic	

== Media usage ==
"Do Something" was used in an MTV Europe commercial advertising summer festivals throughout Europe in 1999. The song was also used in the 1999 film Music of the Heart, and in an episode of music game show Idol.
