= Dave Way =

American record producer

Dave Way is a Grammy Award winning American producer, mixer, and audio engineer based in Los Angeles.

== Career ==
Way has worked with Fiona Apple, Sheryl Crow, Kesha, Pink, Iron & Wine, Fall Out Boy, Al Green, Twenty One Pilots, Yebba, Victoria Monet, Ben Folds, Christina Aguilera, Macy Gray, Rita Ora, Andra Day, Ringo Starr, Shakira, Phoebe Bridgers, John Doe, Savage Garden, Michael Jackson, Spice Girls, Norah Jones, Beck, Eric Clapton, Neil Young, Babyface (Kenny Edmonds), Ziggy Marley, Weird Al Yankovic, Paul McCartney, Mick Jagger, Stevie Wonder, Gwen Stefani, Chris Botti, Jakob Dylan, Andrew WK, Foo Fighters, TLC, Guy, Toni Braxton, Boyz II Men, Kool Moe Dee, Heavy D. & The Boyz, Ayumi Hamasaki, Ronan Keating, and more artists. Way is a four-time Grammy Award-winner as well as a songwriter and co-writer of the number one single "I Like the Way (The Kissing Game)" by the group Hi-Five (1991). He mixed the score for Echo in the Canyon, Flag Day, Reminiscence, Stand Up Guys, in addition to music for Sons of Anarchy, The Bastard Executioner, The Bodyguard, School of Rock, Deepwater Horizon, True Blood, Forgetting Sarah Marshall, Superbad, 50 First Dates, Teen Titans Go to the Movies, Spider-Man, White Men Can't Jump, and other films.

Way, an alumnus of Berklee College of Music in Boston works at his own private Dolby Atmos equipped studio called Waystation Studio.

== Personal ==
Way is married to Jamie Way. They are the former co-owners of The Pass Studios, a commercial studio in Los Angeles (formerly known as Larrabee East and Andora studios).

In 2025, Way appeared as a featured guest at Kingvention, an annual fan convention dedicated to Michael Jackson, held in London.

== Discography ==
Dave Way credits
Artist	Album	Label	Credit	Year
Fiona Apple	Fetch The Bolt Cutters	Epic Records	Mixer, engineer	2020
Chelsea Williams	Beautiful And Strange	Blue Elan Records	Mixer, engineer	2020
Jeff Goldblum	I Shouldn't Be Telling You This	Decca Records	Engineer	2020
Echo In The Canyon	Original soundtrack album	BMG Records	Mixer, engineer	2019
BTS	BTS World Original Video Game Soundtrack	The Verve Music Group	Mixer	2019
Gary Clark Jr.	Deepwater Horizon Original soundtrack	Epic	Mixer	2018
Gwen Stefani	You Make It Feel Like Christmas	Interscope Records	Engineer	2017
Kesha	Rainbow	RCA Records	Engineer	2017
Weird Al Yankovic	Squeezebox:The Complete Works Of Weird Al Yankovic	Scotti Brothers Records	Mixer	2017
John Doe	The Westerner	Cool Rock Records	Producer, mixer, engineer	2016
Mikky Ekko	Time	RCA	Engineer	2015
Andreas Varady	Andreas Varady	The Verve Music Group		2014
Weird Al Yankovic	Mandatory Fun	RCA	Engineer, mixer	2014
7horse	Songs For a Voodoo Wedding	7horse Music	Mixer	2014
John Doe	The Best of John Doe This Far	Yep Roc Records	Producer, mixer, engineer	2014
Thomas Dybdahl	What's Left is Forever	Strange Cargo	Engineer	2014
TLC	20	Epic	Mixer, engineer	2013
Leftover Cuties	The Spark and the Fire	Leftover Cuties	Producer	2013
Scott Weiland	Missing Cleveland	SoftDrive Records/New West Records	Mixer	2013
Macy Gray	Talking Book: The Re-Imaging of a Classic	429 Records	Mixer	2012
Anita Baker	Un-released	Blue Note Records	Mixer	2012
Fiona Apple	The Idler Wheel...	Epic	Mixer	2012
Human Nature	The Motown Record	UMG Recordings	Mixer	2012
Macy Gray	Covered	429 Records	Mixer	2012
Griffith Frank	Romanza	Geffen Records	Mixer	2012
Tara Holloway	Sins to Confess	Waystation	Producer, engineer, mixer	2012
The Design	Young America	UAM	Mixer	2011
John Doe	Keeper	Yep Roc	Producer, engineer, mixer	2011
Justin Hines	Days To Recall	Decca	Mixer	2011
Adam Crossley	Anvil Of A Heart	Independent	Mixer	2010
Andrew W.K.	Mother of Mankind: Rare and Unreleased 1999-2010	Steev Mike	Mixer	2010
Creed Bratton	Bounce Back	Kindred Music	Producer, engineer, mixer	2010
Michael Jackson	This Is It Soundtrack	Epic	Co-producer	2009
The Celtic Tenors	Hard Times	Tayberry Records	Producer, engineer, mixer	2009
Zachary Richard	Last Kiss	Select Records	Mixer	2009
Michael Jackson	King of Pop	Sony Records	Engineer, mixer	2009
Mobile	Tales From The City	Interscope	Mixer	2009
Fischerspooner	Entertainment	FS Studios	Mixer	2009
Human Nature	Get Ready	Sony Music Australia	Mixer	2009
Michael Jackson	Blood on the Dancefloor	Epic	Mixer	2008
The Mooney Suzuki	Selected tracks from the Tropic Thunder soundtrack	Lakeshore Records	Mixer	2008
Priscilla	Casse Comme du Verre	Jive Records	Mixer	2008
Kevin Elliot and The Broken	Damage of This Day	Broken City Records	Engineer, mixer	2008
The Coconutz	Forgetting Sarah Marshall Soundtrack – Selected Tracks	Verve Records	Mixer	
Brent Spiner & Maude Maggart	Dreamland	Bellarama	Producer, engineer, mixer	2008
Robben Ford	Truth	Concord Records	Mixer	2007
John Doe	A Year In The Wilderness	Yep Roc	Producer, engineer, mixer	2007
Macy Gray	Big	Geffen	Mixer	2007
Ziggy Marley	Love Is My Religion	Tuff Gong Worldwide	Mixer	2007
Taylor Kicks	Do I Make You Proud - Single	Arista Records	Co-producer, mixer	2006
Audra McDonald	Build A Bridge	Nonesuch Records	Mixer	2006
Fiona Apple	Extraordinary Machine	Epic/Clean Slate	Mixer	2005
Shakira	Fijacion Oral Vol. 1	Epic	Engineer, mixer	2005
Lisa Marie Presley	Now What	Capitol Records	Mixer	2005
Ringo Starr	Choose Love	Koch Records	Mixer	2005
Alice Cooper	Dirty Diamonds	New West	Mixer	2005
Lindsay Lohan	“To Know Your Name” - Single	Casablanca Records	Mixer	2004
Vanessa Carlton	Harmonium	A&M Records	Mixer	2004
Drive-by Truckers	The Dirty South	New West	Mixer	2004
Hilary Duff	A Cinderella Story Soundtrack	Hollywood Records	Mixer	2004
Old 97's	Live @ Troubador	New West	5.1 surround sound	2004
Van Hunt	Van Hunt	Capitol	Mixer	2004
Juliana Hatfield	In Exile Deo	Zoe Records	Mixer	2004
Robert Downey Jr.	The Futurist	Sony Classical Records	Mixer	2004
Wilson Phillips	California	Columbia Records	Mixer	2004
Sheryl Crow	Best of Collection	A&M	Mixer	2003
Ringo Starr	RingoRama	Koch	Mixer	2003
School of Rock (Jack Black)	School of Rock soundtrack	Atlantic Records	Mixer	2003
Chris Botti	A Thousand Kisses Deep	Columbia	Mixer	2003
Andrew W.K.	The Wolf	Island	Mixer	2003
Macy Gray	The Trouble With Being Myself	Epic	Co-producer, mixer, engineer	2003
Dixie Chicks	Home Bonus DVD	Sony	Engineer, remixer	2002
Macy Gray	Spider-Man soundtrack	Columbia	Mixer	2002
P!nk	Missundaztood	Arista	Mixer	2001
Macy Gray	The Id	Epic	Mixer	2001
Michelle Branch	The Spirit Room	Maverick Records	Mixer	2001
Mick Jagger	Brand New Set of Rules - Single	Virgin Records	Mixer	2001
Paul McCartney	Driving Rain (singles mixes)	Epic	Mixer	2001
Christina Aguilera	Genie in A Bottle - Single	RCA	Mixer	1999
Christina Aguilera	What a Girl Wants	RCA	Mixer	1999
Christina Aguilera	Come On Over	RCA	Mixer	1999
Savage Garden	Affirmation	Columbia	Mixer	1999
Savage Garden	Crash and Burn	Columbia	Mixer	1999
Foo Fighters	Next Year – single mix	RCA	Mixer	1999
