= Macy Gray =

American singer (born 1967)

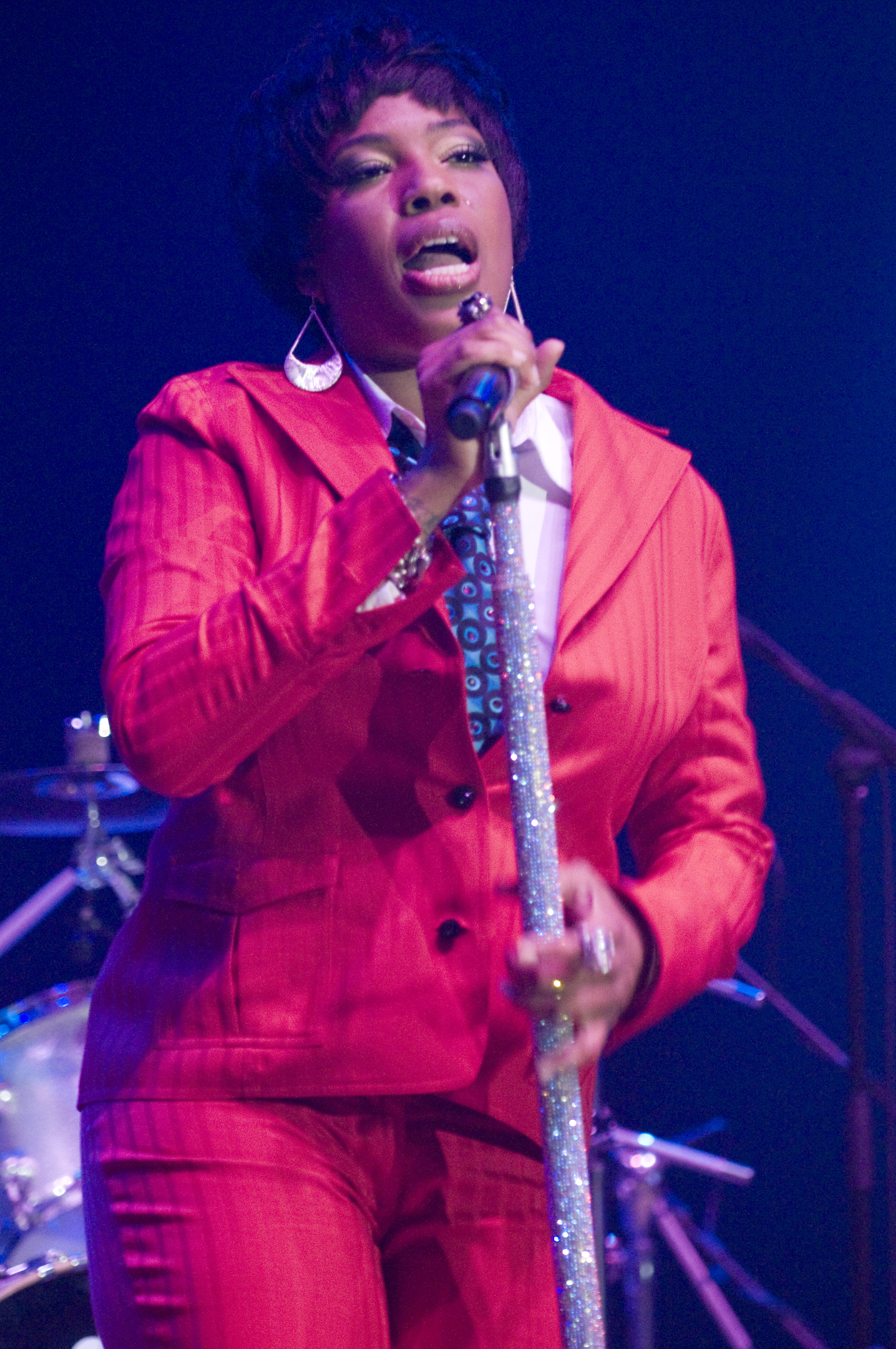
- Gray in 2008

Background information
- Born: Natalie Renée McIntyre; September 6, 1967 (age 59); Canton, Ohio, U.S.
- Education: University of Southern California (BA)
- Genres: R&B; neo soul; jazz
- Occupations: Singer; songwriter; actress
- Works: Macy Gray discography
- Years active: 1990s–present
- Labels: Atlantic; NuTech Digital; Epic; will.i.am; Geffen; Concord; 429; Chesky; E1; Mack Avenue

Natalie Renée McIntyre (born September 6, 1967), known professionally as Macy Gray, is an American R&B and soul singer. She is known for her distinctive raspy voice and a singing style heavily influenced by Billie Holiday. Her 1999 single, "I Try", was her commercial breakthrough; the song peaked at number five on the Billboard Hot 100, won Best Female Pop Vocal Performance at the 43rd Annual Grammy Awards, and preceded her debut studio album, On How Life Is (1999). Since then, she has released ten studio albums.

Gray has won a Grammy Award from five nominations, and sold over 25 million records worldwide by 2018. She has appeared in several films, including Training Day, Spider-Man, Scary Movie 3, Lackawanna Blues, Idlewild, For Colored Girls, and The Paperboy. She was inducted into the National Rhythm & Blues Hall of Fame in 2014 in her hometown of Canton, Ohio.

== Early life ==
Natalie McIntyre was born in Canton, Ohio, the daughter of Laura McIntyre, a math schoolteacher, and Otis Jones. Her stepfather was a steelworker, and her sister is a biology teacher. She has a younger brother, Nate, who owns a gym in West Philadelphia and was featured on the season five finale of Queer Eye. She began piano lessons at age seven. A childhood bicycle mishap resulted in her noticing a mailbox of a man named Macy Gray; she used the name in stories she wrote and later decided to use it as her stage name. She was late developing and did not learn to hold conversation until just before her tenth birthday.

Gray attended elementary school with Brian Warner (later known as musician Marilyn Manson) although they did not know each other. She attended more than one high school, including a boarding school which asked her to leave due to her behavior.

She attended the University of Southern California and studied scriptwriting.

== Musical career ==
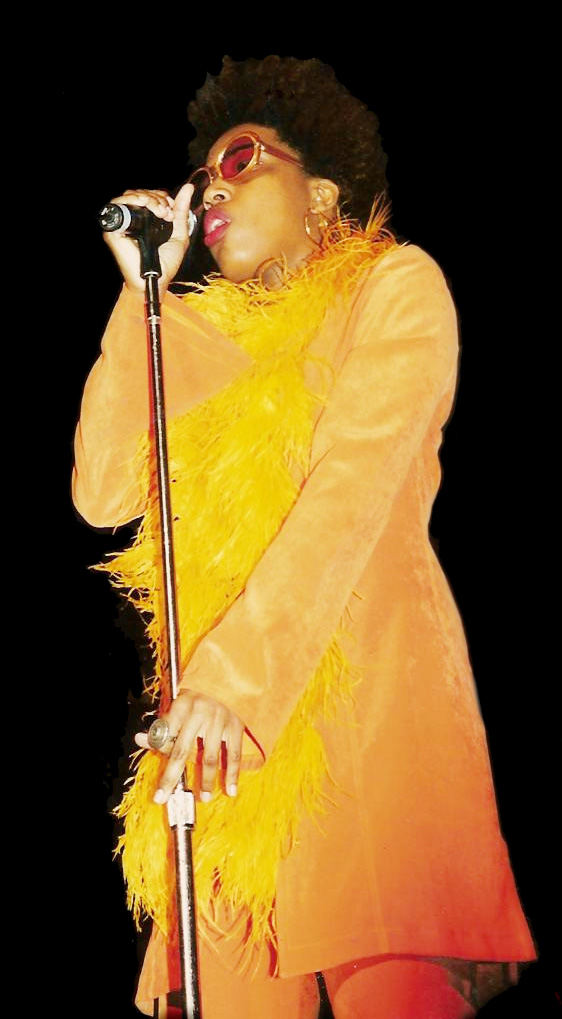
Gray in 1995

While attending the University of Southern California, she agreed to write songs for a friend. A demo session was scheduled for the songs to be recorded by another singer, but the vocalist failed to appear, so Gray recorded them herself.

I started forming bands and writing songs just for fun and then I really got into it and got attached to it. Then a friend of mine asked me to be a singer in his jazz band. He gave me all these jazz CDs and I studied all these different singers and I kind of taught myself how to sing for a gig, but I didn't take it seriously until later.

She then met writer-producer Joe Solo while working as a cashier in Beverly Hills. Together, they wrote a collection of songs and recorded them in Solo's studio. The demo tape gave Gray the opportunity to sing at jazz cafés in Los Angeles. Although Gray did not consider her unusual voice desirable for singing, Atlantic Records signed her. She began recording her debut record but was dropped from the label upon the departure of A&R man Tom Carolan, who had signed her to the label. Macy returned to Ohio but in 1997 Los Angeles based Zomba Label Group Senior VP A&R man Jeff Blue, convinced her to return to music and signed her to a development deal, recording new songs based on her life experiences, with a new sound, and began shopping her to record labels. In 1998, she landed a record deal with Epic Records. She performed on "Love Won't Wait", a song on the Black Eyed Peas' debut album Behind the Front.

=== 1999–2001: On How Life Is ===
Gray worked on her debut album in 1999 with producer Darryl Swann. Released in the summer of 1999, On How Life Is became a worldwide smash. The first single, "Do Something", stalled on the charts, but the second single, "I Try", made the album a success. "I Try" (which was originally featured in Love Jones and the Jennifer Aniston-starring romantic-comedy Picture Perfect in 1997) was one of the biggest singles of 1999, and subsequent singles ("Still" and "Why Didn't You Call Me") ensured the album became triple platinum in the U.S. and quadruple platinum in the UK. The album hit number 1 on New Zealand and Australian album charts.

In 2001, Gray won the Grammy Award for Best Female Pop Vocal Performance for "I Try", which was also nominated for the Song of the Year and Record of the Year Grammys. She then collaborated with Fatboy Slim, the Black Eyed Peas, and Slick Rick (on the song "The World Is Yours", from the Rush Hour 2 soundtrack), as well as acting for the first time, in the thriller Training Day. In August 2001, Gray was booed at the Pro Football Hall of Fame exhibition game after forgetting the lyrics to the American national anthem.

=== 2001–2005: The Id and The Trouble with Being Myself ===
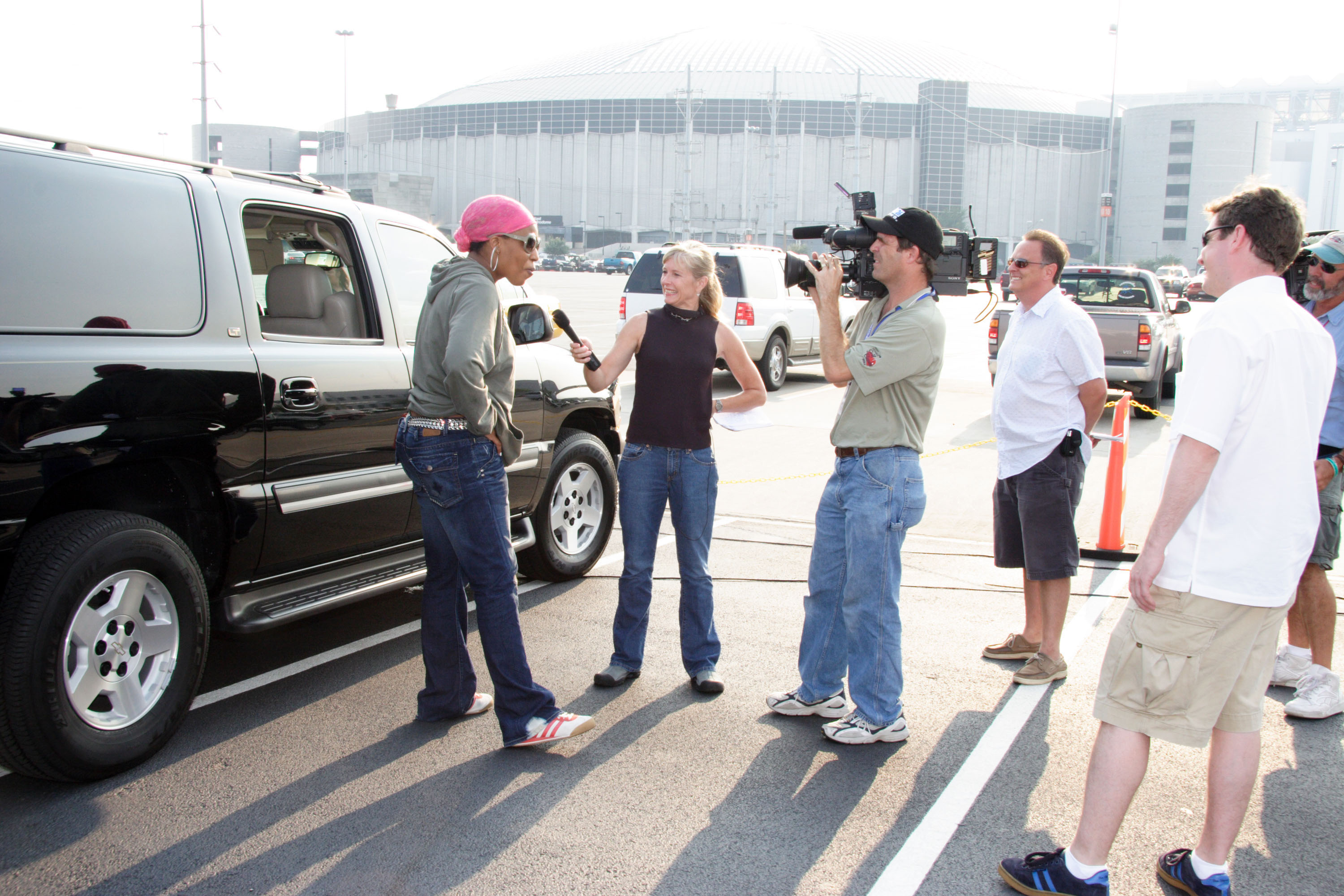
Gray visiting the Astrodome as a volunteer, in Houston, Texas, September 3, 2005

Gray's The Id featured appearances by John Frusciante and Erykah Badu on the single "Sweet Baby" (which was co-written with longtime collaborator Joe Solo). The album peaked at number eleven on the Billboard 200. It fared even better in the UK, where it reached number one on the UK Albums Chart and was certified gold by the BPI.

In 2002, she appeared in Spider-Man and contributed a remix of her song "My Nutmeg Phantasy" to its accompanying soundtrack. Gray also worked with Santana on the track "Amoré (Sexo)", for his album Shaman.

Also in 2002, she appeared on the Red Hot Organization's compilation CD in tribute to Nigerian Afropop pioneer Fela Kuti, Red Hot and Riot. She appeared on a remake of Kuti's classic track "Water No Get Enemy" alongside prominent neo soul, hip-hop and R&B artists, D'Angelo, the Soultronics, Nile Rodgers, Roy Hargrove, and Kuti's son, Femi Kuti.

She recorded a duet with Zucchero called "Like the Sun (From Out of Nowhere)", which featured Jeff Beck on guitar released in 2004 on Zu & Co., a duet collection. Her song "Time of My Life" was included in the soundtrack to 8 Mile. A cartoon based on Gray's childhood was being developed, but it never came to fruition.

In 2003, Gray released her third studio album, The Trouble with Being Myself, to rave reviews. The lead single, "When I See You", became a radio hit in the U.S. and a top-forty hit in the UK, although the album was not as well received by fans. Nevertheless, it became Gray's third top twenty album in the UK. A greatest hits collection and a live album were subsequently released: The Very Best of Macy Gray (2004) and Live in Las Vegas (2005). Additionally, Gray was featured on Marcus Miller's 2005 album Silver Rain, on a cover of Prince's 1986 song "Girls & Boys". She also appeared on the soundtrack to the film Chicago with Queen Latifah and Lil' Kim on "Cell Block Tango/He Had it Comin'".

=== 2007–2010: Return to music and Big ===
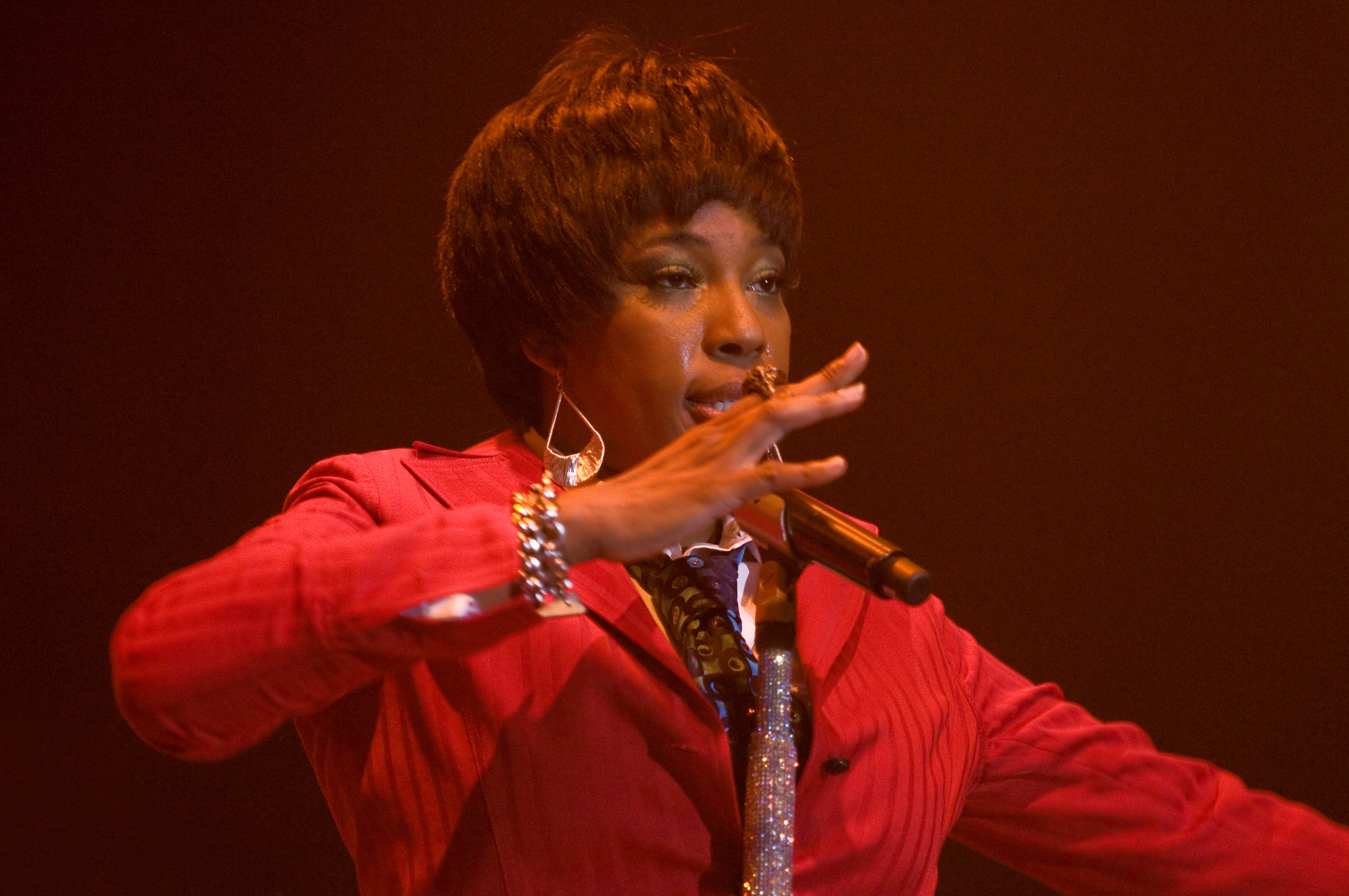
Gray performing in Toronto, July 23, 2008

Gray began 2007 by being kicked off-stage at a concert in Barbados for profanity (which was part of the show), but she was not aware that it was against the law in that country. She gave a public apology that night to avoid arrest.

In March, Gray released her fourth studio album (sixth overall), Big. Two singles, "Finally Made Me Happy" and "Shoo Be Doo", were released from the album. "What I Gotta Do", another track from the album, is featured on the Shrek the Third soundtrack. It has been considered Gray's comeback album, after a four-year hiatus since her last studio album. The album was critically acclaimed and seen by some as her best work to date. It features collaborations with Natalie Cole, Fergie, Justin Timberlake, and will.i.am, who co-executive produced the album with Gray. It was moderately successful in the U.S., where it debuted and peaked at number 39 on the Billboard 200, becoming Gray's highest-charting album since The Id. Big reached number 62 on the albums chart in the UK, her lowest-charting UK album, but it achieved some success in several other countries, including Switzerland, the Czech Republic, and Finland, reaching the Top 40 on their album charts.

PBS's Soundstage live concert series premiered a Gray concert on July 5.

On July 7, 2007, Gray performed at the Brazilian leg of Live Earth at Copacabana Beach in Rio de Janeiro, Brazil. Gray and her band members wore clothes bearing political messages. Gray's dress carried the message "Darfur Red Alert".

In 2008, Gray launched a new campaign under the name "Nemesis Jaxson", with the single "Slap a Bitch".

Early in 2009, Gray recorded the song "Don't Forget Me" for the soundtrack of Confessions of a Shopaholic.

=== 2010–2011: The Sellout ===
The first single from Gray's fifth studio album The Sellout, "Beauty in the World", is featured in the final sequence of the series finale, "Hello Goodbye", of the ABC television series, Ugly Betty. "Beauty in the World" was also used as the theme in multiple videos created by Microsoft to promote Internet Explorer 9. Both singles released from the album ("Beauty in the World" and "Lately") were top 10 hits on the US Billboard Hot Dance Club Songs Chart.

Upon its release, The Sellout received generally mixed reviews from most music critics. Metacritic gave it an average score of 57, based on 15 reviews; Andy Gill of The Independent gave it three out of five stars; while AllMusic writer John Bush shared a similar sentiment and panned Gray's songwriting.

However, The Boston Globe's James Reed commended its production, and Jeremy Allen of NME gave the album a 7/10 rating.

=== 2011–2015: Covered, Talking Book, and The Way ===
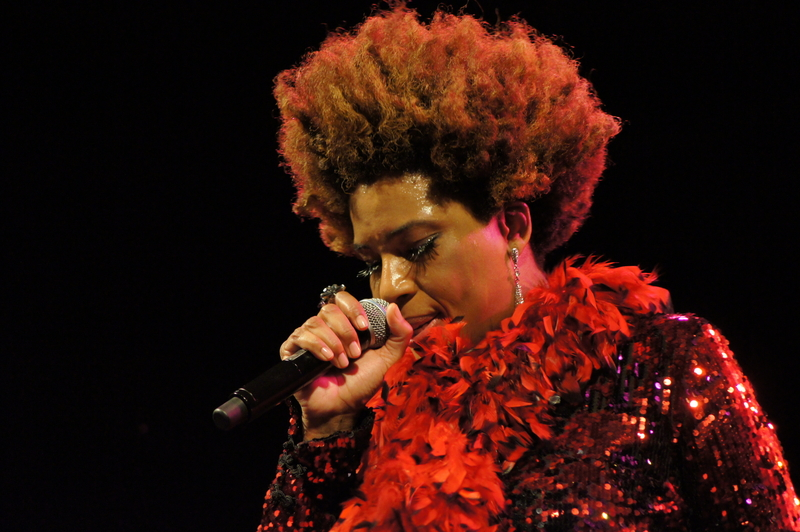
Gray performs live at the 54th Ljubljana Jazz Festival in Ljubljana, Slovenia, on July 6, 2013.

In 2011, Gray signed a deal with 429 Records and started recording a series of covers for her next studio album Covered. The album was officially released on March 26, 2012. The album's first single was "Here Comes the Rain Again" (originally performed by Eurythmics). On February 16, 2012, Gray participated in the Sanremo Festival as a guest, performing alongside Gigi D'Alessio and Loredana Bertè.

For the 40th anniversary of the 1972 Stevie Wonder album Talking Book, Gray covered the entire record and released her Talking Book as a tribute.

In an interview with Oprah Winfrey's Where Are They Now, Gray opened up about her problems with drug abuse, stating that she was ill-prepared for the level of fame she received. The interview coincided with the release of her album The Way, released in October 2014 on Kobalt Records. A world tour was announced shortly after its release.

=== 2016–present: Stripped and Ruby ===
In 2016, Gray's career continued with an album produced by Chesky Records, the record label founded by Grammy-nominated composer and musician David Chesky. Stripped was released September 9, 2016, and garnered almost unanimous praise from critics. The album debuted at No. 3 on the Billboard Jazz Chart. Earlier that year, she was featured on Ariana Grande's song "Leave Me Lonely" from her third studio album, Dangerous Woman.

Gray released her tenth studio album, Ruby, in September 2018.

== Other work ==
In 2001, she was the voice for Seeiah Owens in the video game SSX Tricky. Gray sang the theme song for the Nickelodeon animated series As Told by Ginger, composed by Jared Faber and Emily Kapnek. Gray also performed the song on the short-lived UPN romantic comedy Second Time Around starring Boris Kodjoe and Nicole Ari Parker in 2004. In 2006 Gray appeared in the eighth season of Bravo's Celebrity Poker Showdown, playing for Habitat for Humanity. She finished in third place.

In August 2008, Gray headlined at the 2008 Summer Sundae music festival in Leicester, England, performing cover versions of Rod Stewart's "Da Ya Think I'm Sexy?", Deee-Lite's "Groove Is in the Heart" and Radiohead's "Creep". For the gig, her band wore pink Andy Warhol wigs. On September 28, 2008, Gray sang the American national anthem as part of the Israeli flag-raising ceremony at the Israeli consulate of Los Angeles. Also in 2008, Gray collaborated with Australian DJ and singer Kaz James on the song "Can't Hold Back". The single was released in early 2009 in Australia and is credited to Kaz James featuring Macy Gray. In 2009, Gray briefly competed in season 9 of Dancing with the Stars with professional partner Jonathan Roberts. They were eliminated in a double elimination in week one. In 2012, she performed the Michael Jackson song "Rock with You" for a special performance of the West End musical Thriller – Live for BBC Children in Need Pop Goes the Musical.

In 2015, Gray was featured on the song "Into the Deep" by Galactic. In 2016, Gray was featured on the song "Leave Me Lonely" by Ariana Grande. In 2018, Gray was featured alongside Dolly Parton on a re-recording of "Two Doors Down" for the Dumplin' soundtrack. In 2020, Gray was featured on the single "Out Of Love" by Canadian band Busty and the Bass. The band also released a notable cover of Gray's "I Try" in 2016.

In 2021, Gray competed in season three of the Australian version of The Masked Singer as "Atlantis". On February 20, 2022, Gray performed The Star-Spangled Banner at the 2022 NBA All-Star Game. Gray represented her home state of Ohio at the 2022 America Song Contest with the song "Every Night".

In 2023, Gray competed in season ten of The Masked Singer as the wild card contestant "Sea Queen". She finished in fourth place.

In 2025, Gray competed in season six of the British version of The Masked Singer as "Toad in the Hole", which she was third to be eliminated. She subsequently walked off stage before later returning to unmask in front of the audience and panel.

== Personal life ==
Gray was married to Tracey Hinds, a mortgage broker, for about two years, but they divorced prior to her rise to prominence. They have three children. She opened the Macy Gray Music Academy in 2005.

== Discography ==
Studio albums

- On How Life Is (1999)
- The Id (2001)
- The Trouble with Being Myself (2003)
- Big (2007)
- The Sellout (2010)
- Covered (2012)
- Talking Book (2012)
- The Way (2014)
- Stripped (2016)
- Ruby (2018)

=== Collaborative albums ===
- The Reset (with The California Jet Club) (2023)

== Concert tours ==
Headlining tours

- The Trouble with Being Myself Tour (2003-2004)
- Big Tour (2007)
- The Way Tour (2015)
- Stripped Tour (2017)
- Ruby Tour (2018)
- On How Life Is 25th Anniversary Tour (2025)

Co-headlining tours

- The Reset Tour (2023)

Opening act

- Everyday Tour (2001)

== Filmography ==
=== Film ===
Year	Title	Role	Notes
2001	Training Day	Sandman's Wife	
2002	Spider-Man	Herself	
2003	Gang of Roses	Black Haired Woman	
2003	Scary Movie 3	Herself	
2004	Around the World in 80 Days	Sleeping French Woman	
2005	Lackawanna Blues	Pauline	TV movie
2005	The Crow: Wicked Prayer	Cara Mia	
2005	Shadowboxer	Neisha	
2005	Domino	Lashandra Davis	
2006	Idlewild	Taffy	
2010	For Colored Girls	Rose / Lady in Pink	
2012	The Paperboy	Anita Chester	
2014	Percentage	Mama Cash	
2014	The Grim Sleeper	Margette	
2014	Sacrifice	Nurse Williams	Short
2015	November Rule	Alice	
2015	Brotherly Love	Mrs. Taylor	
2015	Where Children Play	Helen Harrold	
2016	Papa	Agent Macy Sterling	
2016	Cardboard Boxer	Den Mother Chata	
2018	Change in the Air	Donna	
2021	Dutch	Delores Murphy	
2021	Phobias	Renée	
2021	Real Talk	Aisha	
2024	Dutch II: Angel's Revenge	Delores Murphy	
2025	Sneaks	Adriana (voice)	
2025	The Astronaut	Val	

=== Television ===
Year	Title	Role	Notes
1999	Videotech	Herself	Episode: "Videotech Special 7"
1999	Sessions at West 54th	Herself	Episode: "Episode 3.2"
2000	Ally McBeal	Herself	Episode: "Hope and Glory"
2000–01	Saturday Night Live	Herself	Episode: "Episode 30.12" & "30.18"
2001	Say It Loud: A Celebration of Black Music in America	Herself	Episode: "Express Yourself"
2001	VH1 Presents the 80's	Herself	Recurring Guest
2002	MDs	Jess	Episode: "Wing and a Prayer"
2003	The National Lottery Wright Ticket	Herself	Episode: "Episode 1.5"
2003	When I Was a Girl	Herself	Episode: "Singers"
2003	MTV Cribs	Herself	Episode: "Oct 13, 2003"
2003	The Bronx Bunny Show	Herself	Episode: "Episode 1.8"
2004	Blue's Clues	Herself	Episode: "Bluestock"
2004	Simply the Best	Herself	Episode: "Episode 1.4"
2004	American Dreams	Carla Thomas	Episode: "Real-to-Reel"
2004	Duck Dodgers	Lady Chanticleer (voice)	Episode: "Diva Delivery/Castle High"
2004	That's So Raven	Rhonda	Episode: "Taken to the Cleaners"
2005	Punk'd	Herself	Episode: "Episode 6.7"
2005	American Dragon: Jake Long	Trixie's Grandmother (voice)	Recurring Cast: Season 1
2005	1-800-Missing	Cleo	Episode: "A Death in the Family"
2006	Celebrity Poker Showdown	Herself	Episode: "Tournament 8, Game 5"
2007	Dancing with the Stars	Herself/Musical Guest	Episode: "Round 5 Results"
2009	Black to the Future	Herself	Episode: "Hour 4: The 00s"
2009	Head Case	Herself	Episode: "The Wedding Ringer"
2009	Dancing with the Stars	Herself/Contestant	Contestant: Season 9
2013	Choccywoccydoodah	Herself	Episode: "Starstruck: All You Need Is Love"
2013	Night of the Proms	Herself	Episode: "Episode 1.13"
2014	Oprah: Where Are They Now?	Herself	Episode: "Charice's Surprising Revelation, Carmen Electra, Macy Gray & Shadoe Stevens"
2016	Fuller House	Herself	Episode: "Funner House"
2017	Through the Keyhole	Herself	Episode: "Episode 4.5"
2017	Lip Sync Battle	Herself/Competitor	Episode: "Soul Train Special"
2019	The Real Housewives of Potomac	Herself	Episode: "Good Will Haunting"
2021	Big City Greens	Kara Karaoke (voice)	Episode: "Okay Karaoke"
2021	The Masked Singer (Australia)	Atlantis	Contestant: Season 3
2021	The Real Housewives of Potomac	Herself	Episode: "Altar-ed State of Mind"
2022	I Can See Your Voice	Herself	Episode: "Episode 5: Macy Gray, Loni Love, Jodie Sweetin, Cheryl Hines, Adrienne Houghton"
2022	American Song Contest	Herself/Contestant Ohio	Episode: "The Live Qualifiers Part 2"
2022	Women Who Rock	Herself	Main Guest
2023	The Masked Singer (American)	Sea Queen	Contestant: Season 10
2024	The Surreal Life	Herself	Main Cast: Season 8
2025	The Masked Singer (British)	Toad in the Hole	Contestant: Series 6

=== Video game ===
Year	Title	Role
2000	SSX Tricky	Seeiah Owens (voice)

=== Documentary ===
Year	Title
2004	Lightning in a Bottle
2005	All We Are Saying
2009	Life on the Road with Mr. and Mrs. Brown
2021	Mr Nelson on the North Side

== Awards and nominations ==
Award	Year	Recipient	Nominate	Result
BMI Pop Awards	2001	"I Try"	Award-Winning Song	Won
Black Reel Awards	2011	For Colored Girls	Best Ensemble	Won
Brit Awards	2000	Macy Gray	International Breakthrough Act	Won
Brit Awards	2000	Macy Gray	International Female Solo Artist	Won
Echo Music Prize	2001	Macy Gray	Best International Newcomer	Nominated
Grammy Awards	2000	Macy Gray	Best New Artist	Nominated
Grammy Awards	2000	"Do Something"	Best Female R&B Vocal Performance	Nominated
Grammy Awards	2001	"I Try"	Record of the Year	Nominated
Grammy Awards	2001	"I Try"	Song of the Year	Nominated
Grammy Awards	2001	"I Try"	Best Female Pop Vocal Performance	Won
MTV Europe Music Awards	2000	On How Life Is	Best Album	Nominated
MTV Video Music Awards	2000	"I Try"	Best New Artist	Won
MTV Video Music Awards	2000	"I Try"	Best Female Video	Nominated
MTV Video Music Awards	2000	"Do Something"	Best Art Direction	Nominated
MTV Video Music Awards	2000	"Do Something"	Best Cinematography	Won
MTV Video Music Awards	2001	"Geto Heaven Remix T.S.O.I. (The Sound of Illadelph)" (with Common)	Breakthrough Video	Nominated
MTV Video Music Awards	2001	"Request + Line" (with the Black Eyed Peas)	Best Hip-Hop Video	Nominated
NAACP Image Awards	2006	Lackawanna Blues	Outstanding Actress in a Television Movie, Mini-Series or Dramatic Special	Nominated
National Rhythm and Blues Hall of Fame	2014	Macy Gray	National Rhythm and Blues Hall of Fame induction	Inducted
Soul Train Music Awards	2000	On How Life Is	Best R&B/Soul Album, Female	Nominated
Teen Choice Awards	2000	Macy Gray	Female Artist	Nominated
Q Awards	1999	Macy Gray	Best New Act	Nominated
Pollstar Concert Industry Awards	2001	Macy Gray	Best New Artist Tour	Won
Independent Music Awards	2017	Stripped	Best Album: Jazz with Vocals	Won
MVPA Awards	2000	"I Try"	Best Adult Contemporary Video	Won
Billboard Music Video Awards	2000	"Why Didn't You Call Me"	Best New Artist Clip – Pop	Won
NME Awards	2000	Macy Gray	Best New Act	Nominated
NME Awards	2000	Macy Gray	Best Solo Artist	Nominated
Žebřík Music Awards	1999	Macy Gray	Best International Surprise	Nominated
Žebřík Music Awards	2001	Macy Gray	Best International Female	Nominated
Žebřík Music Awards	2002	Macy Gray	Best International Female	Nominated
