= I Try =

1999 single by Macy Gray

Single by Macy Gray

from the album On How Life Is
- B-side: "Don't Come Around"; "Rather Hazy"
- Released: July 23, 1999
- Studio: Paramount, Sunset Sound, A&M (Hollywood, California)
- Genre: Neo soul
- Length: 3:59
- Label: Epic; Clean Slate
- Composers: Macy Gray; Jeremy Ruzumna; Jinsoo Lim; David Wilder
- Lyricist: Macy Gray
- Producer: Andrew Slater

Macy Gray singles chronology
"Do Something" (1999)	"I Try" (1999)	"Still" (2000)

Music video
- "I Try" on YouTube

"I Try" is a song co-written and performed by American musician Macy Gray. Issued as the second single from her debut album, On How Life Is (1999), the song was first released in Japan as a double A-side with "Do Something" on July 23, 1999. Later that year, on September 27, it received its first solo release in the United Kingdom. "I Try" peaked at number six in the United Kingdom, number five in the United States, number two in Canada, and number one in Australia, Ireland, and New Zealand. At the 2001 Grammy Awards, "I Try" won Best Female Pop Vocal Performance, and was nominated for Record of the Year and Song of the Year.

== Critical reception ==
Daily Record called the song "soulful", noting that Macy Gray "has one of the most distinctive singing voices around."

== Music video ==
The music video for the song, directed by American filmmaker Mark Romanek (who had previously directed the video for Gray's "Do Something"), depicts Gray waking up in a hotel room, buying flowers, and traveling through New York City, traveled through by bus and train to meet a man in a park. At the end of the video, Gray is shown to still be in her hotel room.

At the 2000 MTV Video Music Awards, the video won Best New Artist in a Video and was also nominated for Best Female Video. Gray presented the award for Best Pop Video alongside LL Cool J.

== Track listings ==
- UK CD1
1. "I Try" – 3:59
2. "I Try" (Full Crew mix) – 5:21
3. "Don't Come Around" – 4:20
- UK CD2
1. "I Try" – 3:59
2. "I Try" (JayDee remix) – 5:55
3. "I Try" (Bob Power remix) – 3:51
- UK cassette single
1. "I Try" – 3:59
2. "Don't Come Around" – 4:20
- European CD1
1. "I Try" – 3:59
2. "Rather Hazy" – 3:10
- European CD2
1. "I Try" – 3:59
2. "Rather Hazy" – 3:10
3. "I Try" (Full Crew Mix—extended II—no vocoder) – 5:27
- Australian CD single
1. "I Try" – 3:59
2. "Rather Hazy" – 3:10
3. "Do Something" (Black Apple Mix edit) – 3:33
4. "I Try" (Full Crew Mix—extended II—no vocoder) – 5:27
- Japanese CD single (with "Do Something")
1. "I Try"
2. "Do Something"
3. "Do Something" (remixed by Organized Noize)
4. "Do Something" (remixed by King Britt)

== Credits and personnel ==
Credits are lifted from the On How Life Is album booklet.

Studios

- Recorded and mixed at Paramount Studios, Sunset Sound, and A&M Studios (Hollywood, California)

Personnel

- Macy Gray – lyrics, music, back-up vocals
- Jeremy Ruzumna – music, organ
- Jinsoo Lim – music
- David Wilder – music, bass
- Jon Brion – guitars, piano, orchestra bells
- Bendrix Williams – guitars
- Patrick Warren – Chamberlin
- Matt Chamberlain – drums
- Lenny Castro – percussion
- Andrew Slater – production
- Dave Way – recording, mixing
- Krystof Zizka - engineer, producer

== Charts ==
=== Weekly charts ===
Weekly chart performance for "I Try"
Chart (1999–2000)	Peak position
Australia (ARIA)	1
Austria (Ö3 Austria Top 40)	3
Belgium (Ultratop 50 Flanders)	23
Belgium (Ultratip Bubbling Under Wallonia)	17
Canada Top Singles (RPM)	2
Canada Adult Contemporary (RPM)	4
Canada (Nielsen SoundScan)	19
Europe (Eurochart Hot 100 Singles)	19
European Radio Top 50 (Music & Media)	9
France (SNEP)	29
Germany (GfK)	16
Iceland (Íslenski Listinn Topp 40)	28
Ireland (IRMA)	1
Italy (Musica e dischi)	34
Italy Airplay (Music & Media)	6
Netherlands (Dutch Top 40)	39
Netherlands (Single Top 100)	60
New Zealand (Recorded Music NZ)	1
Norway (VG-lista)	5
Scottish Singles Sales (Official Charts)	4
Sweden (Sverigetopplistan)	52
Switzerland (Schweizer Hitparade)	13
UK Singles (Official Charts)	6
UK Hip Hop/R&B (Official Charts)	1
US Billboard Hot 100	5
US Adult Contemporary (Billboard)	21
US Adult Pop Airplay (Billboard)	2
US Adult R&B Songs (Billboard)	35
US Bubbling Under R&B/Hip-Hop Songs (Billboard)	21
US Pop Airplay (Billboard)	1
US Rhythmic Airplay (Billboard)	39
US Top 40 Tracks (Billboard)	1

=== Year-end charts ===
1999 year-end chart performance for "I Try"
Chart (1999)	Position
UK Singles (OCC)	20
UK Airplay (Music Week)	15

2000 year-end chart performance for "I Try"
Chart (2000)	Position
Australia (ARIA)	18
Austria (Ö3 Austria Top 40)	37
Europe (Eurochart Hot 100 Singles)	58
Germany (Media Control)	80
New Zealand (RIANZ)	19
Switzerland (Schweizer Hitparade)	60
US Billboard Hot 100	26
US Adult Contemporary (Billboard)	32
US Adult Top 40 (Billboard)	6
US Mainstream Top 40 (Billboard)	6
US Top 40 Tracks (Billboard)	7

== Certifications ==
Certifications for "I Try"
Region	Certification	Certified units/sales
Australia (ARIA)	Platinum	70,000^{^}
Denmark (IFPI Danmark)	Gold	45,000^{‡}
New Zealand (RMNZ)	3× Platinum	90,000^{‡}
Spain (Promusicae)	Gold	30,000^{‡}
United Kingdom (BPI)	2× Platinum	1,200,000^{‡}
^{^} Shipments figures based on certification alone.^{‡} Sales+streaming figures based on certification alone.

== Release history ==
Release dates and formats for "I Try"
Region	Version	Date	Format(s)	Label(s)	Ref.
Japan	"I Try" / "Do Something"	July 23, 1999	CD	Epic	
United Kingdom	"I Try"	September 27, 1999	CD	Epic; Clean Slate	
United States	"I Try"	October 5, 1999	Rhythmic contemporary; contemporary hit radio	Epic; Clean Slate	
United States	"I Try"	October 18, 1999	Hot adult contemporary radio	Epic; Clean Slate	
United States	"I Try"	October 19, 1999	Urban; urban AC radio	Epic; Clean Slate	
