= Darryl Swann =

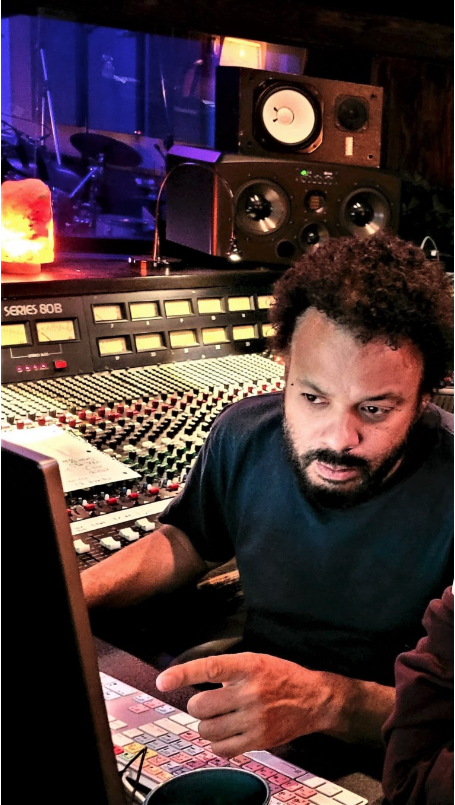

Background information
- Origin: Cleveland, Ohio
- Occupations: Guitarist; Producer; Engineer; Songwriter; Arranger; Orchestral Composer; Educator; Video Game Developer
- Instruments: Guitar-Acoustic and Electric; Bass; Piano; Synthesis- Beat programming
- Years active: 1984 – Present

Darryl Swann is an American record producer, songwriter, educator and musician. Triple platinum award winner, and produced the vocal performance for the Grammy Award-winning Best Female Pop Vocal in 2001. He has worked with prominent artists including, John Frusciante, Macy Gray, The Black Eyed Peas, Greg Hetson, Ryatt, and Mos Def, among others. He has also done substantial work for Atlantic Records, Sony Records, and Universal Records. Darryl also recorded, produced, and mixed the four-song Linkin Park demo tape that got them signed to Warner Bros. Records. This was recorded at Paramount Recording Studios in Hollywood, California. Darryl was hired by then Zomba Music publisher Jeff Blue to work with the band "Xero", who then changed their name to Linkin Park once signed to Warner Music. Jeff Blue then went on to become an A&R executive at Warner Music. The entire process is chronicled in Jeff Blue's best-selling book "One Step Closer". Swann also produced Montell Jordan's first material via LA insider Paul Stewart.

== Early years (1965–1984) ==
Darryl Swann was born and raised in the Cleveland, Ohio suburb of Shaker Heights. Darryl's fascination with music production began at age 9 upon reading the book Modern Recording Techniques. He played lead guitar in the garage band "The Lab Rats" and mixed live sound for many Cleveland area bands throughout his teenage years. After graduating from Shaker Heights High School in 1983, Swann acquired his Liberal Arts degree from UCLA in Westwood, Los Angeles, California. In 1984, Darryl and his new rock band "Haven" relocated to Los Angeles and played with Poison and Warrant at The Troubadour.

== Musical career ==
=== As an artist ===
Haven's success led to a trip to London, England, and a subsequent tour of Europe to promote Haven's independent E.P. album. Since that time, Swann has played guitar, made beats, on the MPC-3000, produced, mixed, mastered, and written songs on numerous records for artists.

=== As a producer ===
==== Senova Media ====
Swann, who is a longtime contributor to ASCAP, is a writer, record producer, and developer of emerging artists under his own production company Senova Media. As both a composer and songwriter, Swann and Senova Media have many film and TV credits. As a result of Swann's understanding of both orchestral composition and contemporary music styles, in 2007, Swann was commissioned to compose and produce orchestral tributes.

=== As an educator ===
Swann teaches a music production curriculum through several notable schools, among them are Musicians Institute, The Art Institute of California - Hollywood and UCLA. His music has been on television shows including MTV's True Life program, NBC's Las Vegas, ESPN's Extreme 16 & Core Culture, and in commercials for Pepsi / Mountain Dew, Honda, So You Think You Can Dance, Motorola's Razor phone and the Apple iPhone. He currently is the CEO of user-generated virtual concert platform Moshpit.live, is a digital consultant for various music-based media companies and labels, and is partnered with Animoca Brands subsidiary MADworld.io . He is also a published author, Dolby Atmos beta-tester, and recurring new-media lecturer at The Grammy Museum, UCLA, and NYU.
