= Crowder =

Crowder may refer to:

== Places in the United States ==
- Crowder, Oklahoma
- Crowder, Mississippi
- Crowder, Missouri
- Crowder College
- Fort Crowder

== Other uses ==
- Crowder (musician), contemporary Christian musician
- Crowder (surname)
- Crowder, someone who plays the crwth, a musical stringed instrument

== See also ==
- Crowd (disambiguation)
- Crowders
