= Crowded =

Crowded may refer to:

- A place with a crowd
- Crowded (song), 2006 song by Jeannie Ortega
- "Crowded", a 1969 song by Nazz on Nazz (album)
- Crowded (TV series), the 2016 television series
- Crowded (comic book), 2018 comic book series

== See also ==
- Crowd (disambiguation)
