= Crowder (surname) =

Crowder is a surname originating in Medieval England. Notable people with the surname include:

- Alfred Crowder (1878–1961), English cricketer
- Alvin Crowder (1899–1972), baseball pitcher
- Corey Crowder (born 1969), American basketball player
- Channing Crowder (born 1983), NFL linebacker
- David Crowder (born 1971), American musician
- Enoch Crowder (1859–1932), American World War I general
- Frederick Crowder (disambiguation), multiple people
- Grace Meigs Crowder (1881–1925), American physician
- Jae Crowder (born 1990), American basketball player
- Jamison Crowder (born 1993), American football player
- Jean Crowder (born 1952), Canadian politician
- John Crowder (1891–1961), British politician
- John Crowder (1756–1830), English alderman; Lord Mayor of London
- Norman Crowder (1926–2013), English Anglican Archdeacon
- Petre Crowder (1919–1999), British politician and barrister
- Randy Crowder (1952–2025), American football player
- Richard Crowder (died 1859), Judge Advocate of the Fleet from 1849 to 1854
- Richard T. Crowder (1939–2024), Chief Agricultural Negotiator in the Office of the US Trade Representative
- Shirley Crowder (born 1939), American track and field athlete
- Steven Crowder (born 1987), American actor, conservative political commentator, and comedian
- Tae Crowder (born 1997), American football player
- Tim Crowder (born 1985), American football player
- Trae Crowder, American actor, liberal political commentator, and comedian
