= Transformers: Animated =

Superhero animated series

- Series logo
- Created by: Sam Register; Matt Youngberg; Derrick J. Wyatt
- Based on: Transformers by Hasbro and Takara Tomy
- Developed by: Marty Isenberg
- Voices of: David Kaye; Jeff Glen Bennett; Corey Burton; Bill Fagerbakke; Cree Summer; Bumper Robinson; Tom Kenny; Tara Strong
- Theme music composer: Andy Sturmer
- Opening theme: "Transformers: Main Theme"
- Ending theme: "Transformers: Main Theme" (Instrumental)
- Composer: Sebastian Evans II
- Countries of origin: United States; Japan
- Original languages: English; Japanese
- No. of seasons: 3
- No. of episodes: 42 (list of episodes)

Production
- Executive producers: Sam Register (seasons 1–2); Brian A. Miller (for Cartoon Network Studios)
- Producer: Vincent Aniceto
- Running time: 22–23 minutes; 44–46 minutes (2-part episodes); 68 minutes ("Transform and Roll Out!" and "Transwarped")
- Production companies: Cartoon Network Studios; Hasbro Entertainment

Original release
- Network: Cartoon Network; TXN (TV Tokyo)
- Release: December 26, 2007 – May 23, 2009

Transformers: Animated is an American animated television series based on the Transformers toy line. It was produced by Cartoon Network Studios and Hasbro Entertainment and animated by The Answer Studio, Mook Animation, and Studio 4°C (shorts). The series debuted on Cartoon Network on December 26, 2007, and ended on May 23, 2009; running for 42 episodes across three seasons. In Japan, the show debuted on April 3, 2010, on both TV Aichi and TV Tokyo.

The show is set in its own stand-alone continuity, separate from any other previous Transformers continuities. Also, the series does feature many references to the other continuities; such as footage from the Generation 1 series being used as a historical film.

== Synopsis ==
=== Series overview ===
The series began with a three-part movie-length episode called "Transform and Roll Out!". Stellar cycles (years) after the Autobots won the great war for Cybertron against the Decepticons, an Autobot maintenance crew led by Optimus Prime and consisting of Ratchet, Bulkhead, Prowl, and Bumblebee discover the legendary AllSpark buried on an asteroid. The Autobots take the AllSpark back to their ship, but are soon confronted by a crew of Decepticons led by the notorious warlord Megatron and consisting of Blitzwing, Lugnut, Blackarachnia, and Starscream. Megatron attacks the Autobot ship and tries to retrieve the AllSpark, but when an explosive planted on Megatron by the treacherous Starscream detonates, the ship crashes on Earth. The Autobots go into stasis to survive the crash, while the scattered remains of Megatron are discovered by a human scientist named Isaac Sumdac.

Half a century later, Professor Isaac Sumdac is the CEO of a robotics company known as Sumdac Systems, which is based in a futuristic version of Detroit in the early-to-mid 2100s. Optimus Prime and the Autobots awaken from stasis and defend the people of Detroit from a monster, resulting in them becoming local celebrities. They befriend Professor Sumdac's young daughter Sari, who teaches them about Earth social norms, and whose security card is transformed into a metallic tool which possesses a fraction of the AllSpark's vast cosmic power. Starscream arrives on Earth and tries to take the all-powerful AllSpark for himself, but the Autobots successfully stop him and save the Earth once again.

=== Season One ===
The Autobots settle into their new home and learn about Earth culture and customs, while also defending Detroit from various threats. Megatron's disembodied head, which has been in Professor Sumdac's laboratory since the ship crashed, comes back online and manipulates Sumdac into building him a new body, pretending that he is an Autobot. Blitzwing and Lugnut arrive on Earth searching for Megatron, while Blackarachnia targets Optimus Prime, blaming him for her techno-organic mutation. New Transformers introduced in the first season include the Autobot Arcee (who only appears in Ratchet's flashbacks), the Decepticon Soundwave, the bounty-hunter Lockdown, and the Dinobots Grimlock, Snarl, and Swoop. Several human villains are also introduced, including Nanosec (who can run at extreme speeds), the Headmaster (who pilots a machine that attaches to and controls large robots) and Meltdown (who is covered in a toxic and corrosive substance). The season ends with Megatron returning with a new body (built by the all-powerful AllSpark from his old body, while also killing Starscream for his betrayal), and the AllSpark exploding into many fragments that scatter across Detroit.

=== Season Two ===
The Autobot Elite Guard members Ultra Magnus, Sentinel Prime, and Jazz arrive on Earth to retrieve the AllSpark, only to learn of its destruction in the Season One finale. While Sentinel completely disbelieves Optimus's claims, Optimus and his team are eventually able to convince Magnus of Decepticon activity on Earth. The main theme for Season Two is the discovery of small fragments of the AllSpark littered across the city (and possibly, the entire planet), while the Decepticons work on building a space bridge back to Cybertron with the help of Isaac Sumdac, who was kidnapped by Megatron in the previous season's finale. This is part of Megatron's plan to invade Cybertron from within, without the Autobots' awareness.

New characters introduced in season 2 include the Autobots Omega Supreme (who was revealed to be Optimus Prime's team's spaceship), Wreck-Gar, Wasp and Blurr, the Decepticons Shockwave, Swindle, Mixmaster and Scrapper, the human villain Slo-Mo (who is able to slow down time using a watch embedded with an AllSpark fragment), and Starscream's army of clones Thundercracker, Ramjet, Skywarp, Sunstorm, and Slipstream (none of the clones are openly referred to by name in the series, the names listed come from the toy-line, while Slipstream was retroactively given her name by Hasbro). At the end of the season, the Decepticon Space Bridge is destroyed, but Megatron, Starscream (resurrected by the AllSpark fragment in his forehead), and Omega Supreme are sucked through and lost in deep space. Sari meanwhile, notices an injury that exposes mechanical components under her skin, revealing that she is not entirely human.

=== Season Three ===
The revelation that she's a robot sends Sari into a whirlwind of shock and disbelief, immediately suspecting her "father" as her creator, despite Sumdac's insistence that he discovered her in a liquid metal form. Ratchet's examination unveils Sari's mixed human and Cybertronian composition. Prowl's inquiry supports Sumdac's account, pinpointing Sari as a Cybertronian protoform merged with Sumdac's genetic code. Using her Key's energy, Sari evolves into a formidable armored techno-organic teenager with advanced weaponry and unique Cybertronian abilities.

Meanwhile, on Cybertron, Shockwave (disguised as the Autobot Longarm Prime) sabotages several Elite Guard operations in preparation for Megatron's return, unaware that Megatron and Starscream are lost in deep space, trying to gain control of Omega Supreme. Suspecting that the double-agent may be the escaped convict Wasp, Ultra Magnus sends Sentinel and Jazz back to Earth to find and apprehend Wasp, who has found his way to Earth to exact revenge on Bumblebee for framing him. Soundwave and Arcee reappear, with Soundwave being accompanied by minions Laserbeak and Ratbat. New characters introduced in season 3 include the Constructicon Dirt Boss, the Autobot scientist Perceptor, Prowl's mentor Yoketron (who only appears in flashbacks), and the flying Elite Guard members Jetstorm and Jetfire.

In the two-part finale, "Endgame", Jazz joins Optimus Prime's team on Earth, while Megatron and Starscream also find their way back to Earth, using information stored deep within Arcee's subconscious mind to create an army of Omega Supreme-sized robots in Lugnut's likeness. Optimus defeats Megatron with the aid of Ultra Magnus' Magnus Hammer (which destroys Megatron's fusion cannon) and a "Wingblade" jetpack built by Professor Sumdac, Ratchet, and Sari while Prowl sacrifices his own vital Spark to reassemble most of the AllSpark into what resembles the Matrix of Leadership, killing Starscream in the process, and destroying the "Lugnut Supremes" all at once. Megatron is arrested, and the Autobots return to Cybertron, and are hailed as heroes upon arriving on their home world with Sari who is intent on learning what it is to be an Autobot and finally about her unique origins.

==== Script Readings ====
Two official script readings in Botcon convention taking place in Animated tells stories after the events of the Third Season but before the proposed 4 Fourth Season.

===== Stunticon Job =====
After the events of Endgame focuses on Animated versions of Sideswipe as a senior police bot with one last case before retirement paired up with a new parter loose cannon Cheetor investigating stolen modifications which would lead to the "Stunt Convoy" show but however were revealed to be Animated versions of the Stunticons (Minus Menasor) and bizzario toxic Optimus Prime clone dubbed Toxitron. Optimus would switch places with Toxitron when the latter got arrested and released due to lack of evidence. Optimus exposes the Stunticons plan with Sideswipe and Cheetor's help put astop to them. However, after Sideswipe retired and settle at the Energon farm it would be attacked by a new Team Charr.

===== The Return of Blurr =====
Taking place around the events of the previous script reading focusing on Sari Sumdac in a Cybertronian class with Animated versions of Headmasters Siren, Horsehead, and Nighbeat with Arcee as its teacher inside of Metroplex. When Sari's classmates was grossed out from her eating her food from Earth she went to throw it in a garbage chute she ends up falling in where she finds the crushed Blurr (From the events of Transwarped Part 2) still alive where in events of trying to escape they accidentally unleashed an Animated version of Kremzeek that ended up taking over some Autobot bodies before trying to hyjack Fortress Maxinus' cannons that would destroy the Iacon later revealed to be created by Shockwave. However using her powers she gained Blurr's speed to race over there while running into Cheetor and Sideswipe along the way. Sari would manage to trap Kremzeek in a cup where Kremzeek. Later on Optimus would use the Allspark to fully restore Blurr where Blurr breaks the fourth wall exited to be back in time for season 4 but when he learns there is no season 4 he asked his agent to get involved with Robots in Disguise or Susan Blu's input to hopefully get into voice directing.

== Episodes ==
Season	Episodes	Originally released	
Season	Episodes	First released	Last released
1	16	December 26, 2007	April 5, 2008
2	13	April 12, 2008	July 5, 2008
3	13	March 14, 2009	May 23, 2009

== Characters ==
The show's poster, displaying the five main Autobots in robot and vehicle modes.

The main Autobots are Optimus Prime, Prowl, Ratchet, Bulkhead, and Bumblebee. The main Decepticon cast is made up of Megatron, Starscream, Blitzwing, Lugnut, and Blackarachnia. The main humans, or as the Transformers call them, "organics",

=== Autobots ===
==== Principal Autobots ====
Source: are Professor Isaac Sumdac, Sari Sumdac, and Captain Fanzone.

- Optimus Prime (voiced by David Kaye) - The young leader of the main Autobot team. He was a wash-out from the Autobot Academy.
- Jazz (voiced by Phil LaMarr) - A member of the Elite Guards who joins Optimus Prime's Autobot team.
- Ratchet (voiced by Corey Burton) - The medical officer and senior member of the main Autobot team. He was a hardened veteran of the Great War.
- Bulkhead (voiced by Bill Fagerbakke) - A member of the main Autobot team.
- Prowl (voiced by Jeff Bennett) - A Cyber Ninja and a member of the main Autobot team.
- Bumblebee (voiced by Bumper Robinson) - The scout and youngest member of the main Autobot team.
- Arcee (voiced by Susan Blu) - An Autobot intelligence officer during the Great War. She befriended a young Ratchet while on a mission together. Arcee was originally a teacher who taught young Autobots.
- Omega Supreme (voiced by Kevin Michael Richardson in the first appearance, Phil LaMarr in later appearances) - A giant Autobot superweapon that served as the main Autobot team's ship. During the Great War, he nearly sacrificed his spark to end the war, leading a younger Ratchet to place him in stasis (in ship mode) until he was properly repaired.

==== Dinobots ====
The Dinobots were the results of animatronic dinosaurs that were exposed to the powers of the AllSpark.

- Grimlock (voiced by David Kaye) - A Cybertronian Tyrannosaurus.
- Snarl - A Cybertronian Triceratops.
- Swoop - A Cybertronian Pteranodon.

==== Elite Guard ====
The following are members of the Autobot Elite Guard:

- Ultra Magnus (voiced by Jeff Bennett) - The leader of the Elite Guards and the Autobots as a whole who wields a war hammer that brings lightning down on his opponents.
- Sentinel Prime (voiced by Townsend Coleman) - An arrogant commander of the Elite Guards who was Optimus Prime's rival. This character's in-series color scheme of blue and gold would go on to be the primary color scheme for his counterpart from the 2024 CGI-animated film, Transformers One.
- Blurr (voiced by John Moschitta Jr.) - A member of the Elite Guards and an intelligence agent.
- Safeguard - A symmetrical fusion of two Autobots.
  - Jetfire (voiced by Tom Kenny) - A member of the Elite Guards and Jetstorm's twin brother. He forms the right side of Safeguard.
  - Jetstorm (voiced by Phil LaMarr) - A member of the Elite Guards and Jetfire's twin brother. He forms the left side of Safeguard.

==== Team Athenia ====
The following are members of Team Athenia:

- Rodimus Prime (voiced by Judd Nelson) - The leader of Autobot group "Team Athenia".
- Ironhide (voiced by Corey Burton) - A member of Team Athenia. He also attended Autobot boot camp with Bumblebee, Bulkhead, Wasp, and "Longarm".
- Hot Shot (voiced by Bill Fagerbakke) - A member of Team Athenia.
- Red Alert (voiced by Tara Strong) - The medical officer of Team Athenia.
- Brawn (voiced by Corey Burton) - A member of Team Athenia. He is the team's muscle.

==== Cybertron Intelligence ====
- Cliffjumper (voiced by David Kaye) - Clerk for the Autobot High Council.
- Highbrow (voiced by David Kaye) - Former head of Cybertron Intelligence and Longarm Prime's immediate predecessor.

==== Other Autobots ====
Sources:

- Alpha Trion (voiced by Phil LaMarr) - An Autobot elder and member of the Autobot High Council.
- Wreck-Gar (voiced by "Weird Al" Yankovic) - A Cybertronic lifeform that was brought to life by an AllSpark fragment exposing a pile of mechanical junk.
- Yoketron (voiced by George Takei) - Maintained the Cyber-Ninja Dojo and was Prowl's mentor. He was mortally wounded by Lockdown near the end of the Great War.
- Perceptor (voiced by an uncredited PlainTalk) - The head of the Autobot Ministry of Science.
- Warpath (voiced by David Kaye) - A veteran of the Great War. He caught a younger Prowl draft dodging near the end of the Great War and brought him to Yoketron's Dojo.
- Grandus (voiced by Jeff Bennett) - An Autobot civilian.
- Tracks (voiced by Townsend Coleman) - An Autobot civilian.
- Rattletrap (voiced by Tom Kenny) - An Autobot criminal who was once interrogated by Ratchet and Captain Fanzone. He also has a fear of organics.
- Autotroopers (voiced by Chris Ho) - The police force responsible for safeguarding Cybertron's streets.

=== Decepticons ===
==== Main Decepticons ====
- Megatron (voiced by Corey Burton) - The leader of the Decepticons.
- Starscream (voiced by Tom Kenny) - Megatron's traitorous, (former) second-in-command of the Decepticons.
- Lugnut (voiced by David Kaye) - A loyal, almost fanatical member of the Decepticons.
- Blitzwing (voiced by Bumper Robinson) - A member of the Decepticons with three faces and personalities. For his voice-portrayal of the character, Robinson used a German accent.
- Shockwave/Longarm Prime (voiced by Corey Burton) - A Decepticon double-agent who infiltrates the Autobot ranks on Cybertron.
- Blackarachnia (voiced by Cree Summer) - A member of the Decepticons and later Predacons. She was formerly an Autobot named Elita One until she was lost in a mission on Archa Seven, where she was attacked by spider-like creatures. When Elita attempted to use her power-replicating abilities on the spiders, she became a techno-organic spider hybrid with the ability to transform into a giant spider.

==== Starscream's clones ====
- Thundercracker (voiced by Tom Kenny) - A clone who represents Starscream's egotism.
- Ramjet (voiced by Tom Kenny) - A clone who represents Starscream's duplicity.
- Skywarp (voiced by Tom Kenny) - A clone who represents Starscream's cowardice.
- Sunstorm (voiced by Tom Kenny) - A clone who represents Starscream's sycophancy.
- Slipstream (voiced by Tara Strong) - The only female clone; she does not tell Starscream what aspect of his personality she represents.
- Dirge - A clone that represents Starscream's greed; did not appear in the show.
- Thrust - A clone that represents Starscream's envy; did not appear in the show.

==== Team Chaar ====
- Strika (voiced by Tara Strong) - The leader of Decepticon group "Team Chaar". She is in a relationship with Lugnut.
- Oil Slick (voiced by Phil LaMarr) - A member of Team Chaar. He specializes in chemical weapons and prefers to attack Autobots when they're transformed.
- Blackout (voiced by Bumper Robinson) - A member of Team Chaar. He is the team's muscle, and can power down electronics with a single stomp.
- Cyclonus - A member of Team Chaar.
- Spittor - A member of Team Charr who can turn into a frog-like bipedal all-terrain walker.

==== Other Decepticons ====
- Lockdown (voiced by Lance Henriksen) - A bounty hunter who often works with the Decepticons. He keeps parts of his victims as trophies.
- Soundwave (voiced by Jeff Bennett) - A sound-manipulating Decepticon created by Megatron and brought to life with Sari's AllSpark Key.
  - Laserbeak - An electric guitar minion of Soundwave that can turn into a raven.
  - Ratbat - A keytar minion of Soundwave who can turn into a bat.
- Swindle (voiced by Fred Willard) - A smooth talking Decepticon con man and arms dealer.
- Wasp/Waspinator (voiced by Tom Kenny) - A former Autobot who was framed as a Decepticon spy by Longarm, the actual Decepticon spy. Wasp was later captured by Blackarachnia and transformed into a techno-organic wasp-like form with the ability to turn into a giant wasp.

==== Constructicons ====
The Constructicons were the results of construction vehicles that were transformed into Cybertronian lifeforms by the AllSpark's powers.

- Mixmaster (voiced by Jeff Bennett) - A member of the Constructicons.
- Scrapper (voiced by Tom Kenny) - A member of the Constructicons.
- Dirt Boss (voiced by John Mariano) - A new member of the Constructicons who becomes the Constructicons' leader through the use of his mind control abilities. He was the result of the AllSpark powers fusing a Headmaster unit and a forklift together.

=== Humans ===
- Professor Isaac Sumdac (voiced by Tom Kenny) - The founder and CEO of Sumdac Systems and Sari's father.
- Sari Sumdac (voiced by Tara Strong) - The techno-organic daughter of Professor Isaac Sumdac. Later in the series, Sari is revealed to have been born from a Cybertronian protoform that appeared in Isaac's lab. Using the AllSpark Key, a key containing the power of the AllSpark, Sari activates her techno-organic abilities, aging her into a teenager.
- Captain Fanzone (voiced by Jeff Bennett) - The police captain of the Detroit Police Department.

==== Detroit civilians ====
- Porter C. Powell (voiced by Bumper Robinson) - The chairman of the board of directors of Sumdac Systems. After Isaac was abducted by Megatron, Powell took control of the company, evicted Sari upon finding no birth certificate of her, confiscated her robots, and rehired Henry Masterson to work for him. When Isaac was rescued, Porter was dismissed from his position.
- Augustus Edsel - The Mayor of Detroit. The AllSpark Almanac revealed his name and his relation to actor Harold Edsel from the original cartoon series episode "Hoist Goes Hollywood".
  - Miss Adrias (voiced by Tara Strong) - A press secretary who does most of the talking for Mayor Edsel.
- The Witwicky Family - A family of three who inhabit Detroit and make sporadic appearances throughout the show.
- Spike Witwicky (voiced by Corey Burton) - The patriarch of the Witwicky family.
  - Carly Witwicky (voiced by Tara Strong) - The matriarch of the Witwicky family.
  - Daniel Witwicky (voiced by Tara Strong) - The son of the Witwicky family.
  - Sparkplug (voiced by Jeff Bennett in "Nature Calls", David Kaye in "Sari, No One's Home", John Mariano in "Three's a Crowd") - A construction foreman who makes sporadic appearances throughout the show.

=== Villains ===
Not all of the Autobots' enemies are Decepticons. They have also fought some evil humans as well:

- Angry Archer (voiced by Jeff Bennett) - A Robin Hood-style criminal who gets thwarted by Optimus Prime. Later joins the Society of Ultimate Villainy.
- Nanosec (voiced by Brian Posehn) - A burglar who was secretly given an experimental speed-enhancing suit by Megatron. Though the side-effect aged him to an old man. He later joins the Society of Ultimate Villainy after Slo-Mo de-ages him.
- Prometheus Black/Meltdown (voiced by Peter Stormare) - The founder of Biotech Unbound and Sumdac's business rival. Became the supervillain Meltdown after a freak lab accident following Porter C. Powell cutting off his funding.
  - Cyrus "Colossus" Rhodes (voiced by Corey Burton) - Meltdown's chief henchman, an elderly wrestler given strength-enhancing biotech.
  - Fusion Creatures - Two chimeric humanoid hybrid creatures that Meltdown created from humans as part of an attempt to make transforming humans. Though the first appearance have them around Captain Fanzone's height, the second appearance has them around the Cybertronian's height.
    - Fusion Creature #1 - A Fusion Creature with the face, ears, and wings of a bat, the snout and neck fur of a wolf, a bear-like upper body and left forearm, an arthropod-like right leg, and a reptilian left leg. Meltdown stated that he created it from his former lawyer.
    - Fusion Creature #2 - A Fusion Creature with a shark-like head, a scaly humanoid torso, the right claw of a crab, two cephalopod-like tentacles for a left arm, and webbed feet. The AllSpark Almanac reveals that this creature was created from Meltdown's former stockbroker.
- Profesor Princess (voiced by Kath Soucie) - A little girl supervillain and inventor. Later joins the Society of Ultimate Villainy.
- Henry Masterson/Headmaster (voiced by Alexander Polinsky) - A former Sumdac Systems engineer and inventor of the Headmaster unit. Masterson turned to villainy after being fired due to the reckless demonstration of his Headmaster unit. After Isaac is abducted by the Decepticons, Masterson is rehired by Porter C. Powell.
- Master Disaster (voiced by Bill Faggerbakke) - Hosts televised, illegal street-races on his pirate television show Street Demon.
- Slo-Mo (voiced by Tara Strong) - A villainess who uses an AllSpark fragment, lodged in a pocket watch, to slow down police and Autobots.

== Comic adaptation ==
Transformers: Animated was adapted into comics and published by IDW Publishing in 2008. The book uses screen captures from the series arranged in comic book style panels. In the same year, they also published a comic series featuring original stories titled Transformers Animated: The Arrival. In Japan, a manga adaptation titled Transformers Animated: The Cool (トランスフォーマー アニメイテッド ザ・クール) was created by Naoto Tsushima and serialized in Kadokawa Shoten's Kerokero Ace magazine from March 26, 2010, to March 26, 2011.

== Production ==
The series is animated by Japanese animation studios MOOK DLE, The Answer Studio, and Studio 4°C. Formerly known by the working title Transformers: Heroes, its new simplified title was designed to specifically distinguish it from the live-action film released in July 2007, months before the first episode aired. The series is distributed internationally by Entertainment Rights. Hot Shot was originally going to be part of the main cast, but was replaced by Bumblebee. Hot Shot still makes an appearance in the show.

The show's supervising director is Matt Youngberg (Teen Titans, The Batman), with Cartoon Network vice-president Sam Register, who also created Hi Hi Puffy AmiYumi, as an executive producer and Vincent Aniceto as a line producer. Additionally, Beast Machines writer Marty Isenberg returned as the head writer for this series. Art director and lead character designer Derrick J. Wyatt (Teen Titans, Ben 10: Omniverse, and Scooby-Doo! Mystery Incorporated) created the controversial "brand new look" that this series introduces.

The first episode was due to be screened in full on November 3–4, 2007, at the NTFA Mini-Con, a Transformers convention in Arlöv, Sweden, but American toymaker Hasbro pulled their approval of the screening of the full episode, despite it being green-lighted by Hasbro Nordic at first. The episode had to be cut down to the first 11 minutes.

=== Japanese version ===
While Transformers: Animated had aired and completed its run in many other territories, the release of the series in Japan had been delayed. However, on December 18, 2009, it was announced through the launch of the official website that Takara Tomy would be bringing the series to Japan come Spring 2010. Later, TV Tokyo affiliate, TV Aichi confirmed the exact date of broadcast, which was April 3, 2010, at 8:00AM.

The series was shown in a 4:3 aspect ratio, similar to Cartoon Network's broadcast, unlike the original 16:9 ratio used by The Hub. To compensate, the Japanese version added side backgrounds, such as one featuring the Autobot insignia.

In line with the Japanese movie release, Takara Tomy modified the dub to resemble the movie more closely, retaining many of the original character names. Optimus Prime's name was kept instead of changing it to Convoy. However, to align the main cast with the movie, Bulkhead was renamed Ironhide, which meant the English version's Ironhide had to be renamed "Armorhide".

Following the trend of earlier Transformers series such as Beast Wars and Beast Machines, the Japanese dub of Transformers: Animated takes on a more cheerful tone than the original. It includes a lot of self-referential, fourth-wall-breaking humour, and numerous pop-culture references.

The Japanese opening theme is "TRANSFORMERS EVO." performed by JAM Project, while the ending theme is "AXEL TRANSFORMERS" by Rey.

== Cast ==
=== Main cast ===
- Jeff Bennett – Prowl, Ultra Magnus, Soundwave, Mixmaster, Grandus, Captain Fanzone, Angry Archer, Sparkplug (Season 1)
- Corey Burton - Ratchet, Megatron, Shockwave, Ironhide, Spike Witwicky, Cyrus "The Colossus" Rhodes, Cyclonus, Brawn
- Bill Fagerbakke – Bulkhead, Hotshot, Master Disaster
- David Kaye – Optimus Prime, Grimlock, Lugnut, Highbrow, Cliffjumper, Warpath, Sparkplug (Season 2)
- Tom Kenny – Starscream, Scrapper, Wasp/Waspinator, Jetfire, Skywarp, Sunstorm, Thundercracker, Ramjet, Rattletrap, Professor Isaac Sumdac, Tutor Bot
- Bumper Robinson – Bumblebee, Blitzwing, Blackout, Porter C. Powell, Lester Black
- Tara Strong – Sari Sumdac, Red Alert, Strika, Slipstream, Teletraan I, Miss Adrias, Daniel, Carly, Slo-Mo, Receptionist Bot
- Cree Summer – Blackarachnia/Elita One

=== Additional voices ===
- Susan Blu – Arcee, Flareup
- Townsend Coleman – Sentinel Prime, Tracks
- Lance Henriksen – Lockdown
- Phil LaMarr – Jazz, Oil Slick, Omega Supreme (Season 3), Jetstorm, Alpha Trion
- John Mariano – Dirt Boss, Sparkplug (Season 3)
- John Moschitta Jr. – Blurr
- Judd Nelson – Rodimus Prime
- Alexander Polinsky – Henry Masterson/Headmaster
- Brian Posehn – Nino Sexton/Nanosec
- Kevin Michael Richardson – Omega Supreme (Season 2)
- Kath Soucie – Professor Princess, Trisha
- Peter Stormare – Prometheus Black/Meltdown
- George Takei – Yoketron
- Fred Willard – Swindle
- "Weird Al" Yankovic – Wreck-Gar

== Crew ==
- Susan Blu – Casting Director and Recording Director
- Marty Isenberg – Story Editor
- Matt Youngberg – Supervising Producer
- Sebastian Evans – Composer

== Home video and streaming/digital releases ==
=== North America ===
The North American releases feature full-screen video and stereo sound in both English and Spanish (except Season Three and The Complete Series (both feature widescreen video and stereo sound in only English)).

- Transform and Roll Out (DVD, June 17, 2008)

A single DVD containing the feature-length premiere "Transform and Roll Out".
Also includes the first two unaired shorts, "Career Day" and "Evel Knievel Jump".
- A Target exclusive version came with a second disc containing the follow-up episode "Home Is Where the Spark Is".

- Season One (DVD, August 19, 2008)

A two-disc set containing the complete first season, from "Home Is Where the Spark Is" to "Megatron Rising Part II".
Also includes a season 2 "sneak peek" photo gallery.

- Season Two (DVD, January 6, 2009)

A two-disc set containing the complete second season, from "The Elite Guard" to "A Bridge to Close Part II", with audio commentary on selected episodes.
Also includes the shorts "Starscream Heckles Megatron" and "Explosive Punch" and a photo gallery.

- Season Three and The Complete Series (DVD, June 10, 2014)

Shout! Factory released the third season on DVD on June 10 as well as the complete series afterwards.

As of 2024, the series is currently available for streaming online on the official Transformers YouTube channel (the first and second seasons only), as well as Kabillion and the AVOD/ FAST services Plex, Pluto TV, The Roku Channel and Tubi, as they use the widescreen masters from both the 2014 Shout! Factory DVD release and Cartoon Network HD/Hub Network broadcasts and the only Cartoon Network Studios-produced show to made available on the AVOD/FAST streaming services.

=== United Kingdom ===
Whereas in North America the series was released in complete seasons, the UK instead got several single-disc "volumes" containing four episodes each, also featuring full-screen video, but with audio and subtitles in English and German.

- Transform and Roll Out (DVD, August 4, 2008)

Contains the feature-length premiere "Transform and Roll Out" and the shorts "Career Day" and "Evel Knievel Jump".

- Volume One: Blast from the Past (DVD, October 20, 2008)

Contains episodes 4 Home Is Where the Spark Is, 5 Total Meltdown, 6 Blast From the Past and 7 Thrill of the Hunt

- Volume Two: Lost and Found (DVD, June 15, 2009)

Contains episodes 8 Nanosac, 9 Along Came a Spider, 10 Sound and Fury, 11 Lost and Found

- Volume Three: Megatron Rising (DVD, June 15, 2009)

Contains episodes 12 Survival of the Fittest, 13 Headmaster, 14 Nature Calls 15 Megatron Rising Part 1 and 16 Megatron Rising Part 2

- Volume Four: Mission Accomplished (DVD, June 15, 2009)

Contains episodes 17 The Elite Guard, 18 Return of the Headmaster, 19 Mission Accomplished and 20 Garbage In, Garbage Out

- Volume Five: Fistful of Energon (DVD, September 3, 2009)

Contains episodes 21 Velocity, 22 Rise of the Constructicons, 23 A Fistful of Energon and 24 S.U.V - Society of Ultimate Villany

- Volume Six: Black Friday (DVD, November 5, 2009)

Contains episodes 25 Autoboot Camp, 26 Black Friday, 27 Sari, No One's Home, 28 A Bridge Too Close, Part 1 and 29 A Bridge Too Close, Part 2

=== Germany ===
Germany saw the same releases as the UK.

- Transformieren und Abfahrt (English: Transform and Roll Out) (DVD, September 10, 2008)

Contains the feature-length premiere "Transform and Roll Out" and the shorts "Career Day" and "Evel Knievel Jump".

- Volume Eins: Drachenkämpfer (English: Dragon fighter(s)) (DVD, October 13, 2008)

Contains the episodes "Home Is Where the Spark Is" through to "The Thrill of the Hunt".

- Volume Zwei: Die alten Waffen (English: The old weapons) (DVD, March 12, 2009)

Contains the episodes "Nanosec" through to "Lost and Found".

- Volume Drei: Megatrons Auferstehung (English: Megatron's Resurrection) (DVD, June 4, 2009)

Contains the episodes "Survival of the Fittest" through to "Megatron Rising - Part 2"

- Volume Vier: Mission erfüllt (English: Mission Accomplished) (DVD, August 20, 2009)

Contains the episodes "The Elite Guard" through to "Garbage In, Garbage Out"

- Volume Fünf: Der doppelte Starscream (English: The double Starscream) (DVD, October 15, 2009)

Contains the episodes "Velocity" through to "SUV: Society of Ultimate Villainy"

- Volume Sechs: Schwarzer Freitag (English: Black Friday) (DVD, TBA 2009)

Contains the episodes "Autoboot Camp" through to "A Bridge Too Close, Part II"

=== Japan ===
In a press release by Takara Tomy, it was announced that starting in Fall 2010, they would be releasing the series on DVD by Paramount Home Entertainment Japan.

== Video games ==
Transformers Animated: The Game is the first game based on the series. Released for the Nintendo DS platform in October 2008 by Activision.

Two arcade games, Transformers Animated: The Chase and Transformers Animated: The Shooting were released in Japan by Sega. Both games took advantage of the cards included in the Japanese releases of the toy line.
