= List of Super Robot Monkey Team Hyperforce Go! episodes =

This is a list of episodes of the American and Japanese animated series Super Robot Monkey Team Hyperforce Go!. Created by Ciro Nieli with animation by The Answer Studio, the show aired for four seasons between 2004 and 2006.

== Series overview ==
Season	Episodes	Originally released	
Season	Episodes	First released	Last released
1	13	September 18, 2004	December 18, 2004
2	13	February 6, 2005	May 15, 2005
3	13	October 24, 2005	February 20, 2006
4	13	September 9, 2006	December 16, 2006

== Episodes ==
=== Season 1 (2004) ===
No. overall	No. in season	Title	Directed by	Written by	Original release date	Prod. code
1	1	"Chiro's Girl"	Ciro Nieli and Fumio Maezono	Henry Gilroy	September 18, 2004	101
Chiro falls for a new girl, Jinmay, not knowing that she's a robot under the Skeleton King's control, but even Jinmay doesn't know it (meaning that she wasn't created by him). Jinmay's monkey companion, Sakko, who was secretly a spy for the Skeleton King, took her to the Skeleton King's lair and then constructed & remodeled her to be evil. Then it's a showdown between the monkey team and an evil robot Jinmay, under the control of Sakko. Jinmay must remember the good memories with Chiro to get back control of herself, and then stop the evil Skeleton King.
2	2	"Depths of Fear"	Ciro Nieli and Fumio Maezono	Rob Hoegee	September 25, 2004	102
It's hot in Shuggazoom City. Very hot. So the monkeys decide to cool off with a swim, and everyone seems excited; except Sprx-77 and Chiro. But the water begins to rise, and soon floods the city. On a rescue mission, Chiro's fear holds him back once more, and no doubt would he have drowned if the team had not saved him at the last minute. Deciding to get to the source of the problem, they plunge down to the deep depths of Shuggazoom's water base, to find that the pillars holding everything up are terribly corroded. And the massive dents look a lot like teeth marks...
3	3	"Planetoid Q"	Ciro Nieli and Fumio Maezono	Kevin Hopps	October 2, 2004	103
Just as Chiro is beginning to understand the mysterious Power Primate, an enormous planetoid known as Q is detected headed straight toward the planet. Gibson's plan is to fly up in the Super Robot, and blast Q with Otto's newly completed gravaton disrupter. Simple, right? Not quite. Imagine the team's surprise when they discover that the giant planetoid is actually a living, speaking space creature! Their only hope is to be swallowed by Q, and disable the propulsion unit within it. Unfortunately for Chiro and the monkey team, this task won't be as easy to carry out as it sounds.
4	4	"Magnetic Menace"	Ciro Nieli and Fumio Maezono	Kevin Campbell	October 9, 2004	104
On patrol of the city, Sparx detects a strange force nearby. Chiro is eager to watch his favorite TV show The Sun Riders, so the magnet-fisted monkey insists that he go alone. He hasn't gone far when the other monkeys realize that he's disappeared, and they can't contact him in any way. They set out to find him, and after a bumpy ride in the Super Robot, they find themselves stranded in a wasteland of junk, occupied by Lord Scrapperton, a man who has "upgraded" all of his human parts to make himself fully robot. But this guy seems way too happy – creepy happy – and Chiro is suspicious. He keeps the cybernetic collector busy while the monkeys search for their friend. Guest appearance: Eric Idle as Scrapperton
5	5	"The Sun Riders"	Ciro Nieli and Fumio Maezono	Henry Gilroy & Barry Hawkins	October 16, 2004	105
Chiro is explaining to the monkeys about his favorite TV show, The Sun Riders, when they see that the Formless are spotted in Shuggazoom City. They find out that the Formless are chasing The Sun Riders. After rescuing them, Chiro invites them to team up while the monkeys fix there bikes. While they're training with Chiro, he and the monkeys find out that they work for Skeleton King and that they have taken control of the Super Robot. Guest appearance: Keone Young as Super Quasiar and Meredith Salenger as Aurora Six
6	6	"Secret of the Sixth Monkey"	Ciro Nieli and Fumio Maezono	Kevin Campbell	October 23, 2004	106
After a narrow victory against an eye creature, Antauri tells the monkeys to create new techniques by tomorrow. Chiro stumbles upon a monkey helmet and monkey glove which makes a shield. Antauri tells him of the original leader and that the glove used to belong to him. Meanwhile, in space, a strange creature finds the other glove, and brings it to the Skeleton King. He is then revealed to be an orange monkey named Mandarin, the original leader of the Hyperforce. Guest appearance: James Hong as Mandarin
7	7	"Pit of Doom"	Ciro Nieli and Fumio Maezono	Tad Stones	October 30, 2004	113
With the monkeys always beating the Formless before he does, Chiro is starting to feel a bit useless. After a failed attempt to catch the creatures before his teammates did, he discovers that the citizens of Shuggazoom City have mysteriously disappeared. And a trip inside a weird elevator without buttons leaves Chiro imprisoned in a massive pit. But with the help of the Power Primate, he is able to call the team. They come to him rescue, only to be captured as well. Can the Hyperforce rescue the citizens of Shuggazoom from the Pit of Doom? Will they defeat Elevator Monster?
8	8	"Thingy"	Ciro Nieli and Fumio Maezono	Kevin Hopps & Jymn Magon	October 31, 2004	107
After saving a small abandoned creature from an avalanche of rocks on Shuggazoom's moon, Ranger 7, Chiro takes a liking to the little guy and, much to Gibson's dismay, adopts it until they can find its true home planet. At first Chiro has a blast with Thingy, until weird things start happening. The Super Robot's functions go out of whack, even dumping Gibson into deep space. It seems as if Thingy is to blame, but it turns out that a virus created by the Skeleton King is making the Robot fall apart. To make matters worse, the virus has infected Gibson, transforming him into an evil mutant minion of the Skeleton King! Guest appearance: Frank Welker as Thingy
9	9	"Flytor"	Ciro Nieli and Fumio Maezono	Brandon Sawyer	November 6, 2004	109
Chiro, who is tired of giving up his precious time to protect the city, suggests that an automatic defense system should be constructed to keep Shuggazoom City safe, so he doesn't have to. Otto and Gibson create the perfect line of defense, and it works magnificently after an attack by a weird space creature. But things start to get out of hand when three horrifying beasts slip through the cracks. The team successfully captures them, only to have them merge and go on a destruction spree! Now Chiro must take responsibility for relying on a machine to do the job that he was chosen to do, and stop Flytor with the team's help – even if it means shutting down their impressive defense grid for good.
10	10	"A Man Called Krinkle"	Ciro Nieli and Fumio Maezono	Brandon Auman	November 20, 2004	112
Meet Gyrus Krinkle, a man who dreams of becoming part of the Monkey Team. But when Chiro turns him down, he realizes that it's time to take matters into his own hands. Krinkle hatches a scheme to make himself leader of the monkeys – whether they want it or not. Guest appearance: Jeffrey Combs as Gyrus Krinkle
11	11	"Ape New World"	Ciro Nieli and Fumio Maezono	Kevin Campbell & Kevin Hopps	December 4, 2004	202
In deep space, the Super Robot is locked in fierce battle, and as a last resort, hyperspeed is activated. The team soon finds themselves landed in a strange place where the monkeys are worshiped as the "Redeemers". The robotic ape inhabitants claim that this place is actually Shugazoom City – 2 million years into the future! But Chiro isn't so sure that the strange primates are telling the truth... Guest appearance: Jeff Bennett takes over the role of Scrapperton
12	12	"Circus of Ooze"	Ciro Nieli and Fumio Maezono	Greg Weisman	December 11, 2004	111
When the team hits the circus for a day of food and fun, they get that and much more than they wanted. The mysterious ringmaster has taken an interest in the monkeys, and soon captures them with the help of the strange Snake Charmer and the enchanting Jungle Girl. With the monkeys forced to perform and Chiro being held captive as well, only Otto can save the day. But can he free the rest of the team and stop these side show freaks from transforming all of Shuggazoom's citizens into creepy clowns? Guest appearance: Robert Englund as the Ringmaster
13	13	"Hidden Fortress"	Ciro Nieli and Fumio Maezono	Barry Hawkins	December 18, 2004	203
A foe known as the "Supreme Destructor" is causing havoc. He apparently killed Jinmay. The monkeys and Chiro travel to outer space in search of the villain. He is revealed to be Mandarin, working for the Skeleton King. The monkeys are busy trying to escape through an obstacle course, so they can help Chiro beat him. Antauri sends Chiro a message to use the Power Primate to defeat Mandarin. Then, Sakko appears, also working for Skeleton King. Can the Power Primate's force defeat all three of these evil fiends?

=== Season 2 (2005) ===
No. overall	No. in season	Title	Directed by	Written by	Original release date	Prod. code
14	1	"Skeleton King"	Ciro Nieli and Fumio Maezono	Henry Gilroy	February 6, 2005	204
With only Gibson and a half damaged Super Robot, Chiro must mount a rescue against the Citadel of Bone to save the Hyperforce from tortuous brainwashing by Mandarin and Sakko. As Chiro and Gibson explore the citadel's nightmarish interior they discover secrets of Chiro's past as well as a secret of Skeleton King himself. Can Chiro harness the Power Primate, free his friends, and defeat Skeleton King before he unleashes a wave of evil on Shuggazoom?
15	2	"World of Giants"	Ciro Nieli and Fumio Maezono	Kevin Hopps & Tom Hart	February 12, 2005	201
When Sparx says that Tolomac 3 is just another piece of rock floating in space, he couldn't be more wrong. It turns out that there's an entire kingdom of giants living there, and they've mistaken the Super Robot for one of their own. Sparx decides to take advantage of the situation and pose as a knight, but the Robot is losing power, and unless the team can find the nearby energy source, they'll be stuck there for good! But there's one who doesn't want them to leave – he wants to get rid of this "square-headed knight" himself... But don't forget the new "girlfriend" Sparx gets while he's there. Guest appearance: Rip Taylor as King of Giants
16	3	"The Lords of Soturix 7"	Ciro Nieli and Fumio Maezono	Brandon Auman	February 19, 2005	108
Responding to a distress call, the Super Robot crash lands on Soturix 7. To make things worse, an energy field around the planet has shorted out the robot, Chiro's powers, AND the minds of the rest of the Monkey Team! Now Chiro must brave Skurgg's sadistic games, survive the desert, and reclaim his friends... and his only hope is to connect with the Power Primate on an entirely new level. Guest appearance: Wil Wheaton as Skurgg
17	4	"In the Grip of Evil"	Ciro Nieli and Fumio Maezono	Brandon Auman	February 25, 2005	206
It all started with the nightmares. But nobody could've predicted how much more they would soon become. The team is whisked away to a strange dream world where all their hopes, fears, and memories are seemingly reality – including Skeleton King. The monkeys and Chiro are about to discover something they thought they'd all forgotten. But memories can never completely fade...
18	5	"Versus Chiro"	Ciro Nieli and Fumio Maezono	Brandon Auman	March 5, 2005	207
It was just an ordinary day of training – until Chiro's head blew off! It turns out to be a Formless clone, and the monkeys are on a wild chase around the city to find the real one. Meanwhile, the real Chiro is held hostage at Mandarin's fortress. It won't be easy to escape – there are deformed clones at every corner! Can the monkeys rescue Chiro in time?
19	6	"Shadow Over Shuggazoom"	Ciro Nieli and Fumio Maezono	Henry Gilroy & Kevin Hopps	March 12, 2005	205
Skeleton King plants an eye monster in the waters of Shuggazoom. The monster grows, then attacks all the citizens. When someone look into its gigantic eye, they become mind-controlled zombies. It also controls Sparx, Gibson, Nova and Otto! Only Chiro and Antauri, and two other kids, BT and Glenny resist the spell only for Glenny to get attacked and bitten by Otto and Nova, while Antauri and BT looks into its eye turning them into zombies. But soon enough, Chiro is the only one left. Can Chiro stop the monster and save all the citizens of Shuggazoom along with his monkey comrades?
20	7	"The Sun Riders Return"	Ciro Nieli and Fumio Maezono	Barry Hawkins	March 19, 2005	209
Chasing the latest Skeleton King monster into space, the Monkey Team encounters not only the villain's latest diabolical scheme, but an apparently reformed team of Sun Riders. But the questions remains... can these reformed heroes truly be trusted?
21	8	"Hunt for the Citadel of Bone"	Ciro Nieli and Fumio Maezono	Greg Weisman	April 9, 2005	210
When a fragment of the Citadel of Bone is spotted, you can be sure the Hyperforce is after it. But when they come across an old piloting legend, the team get a lot more than they bargained for. Sure enough, the Citadel is still in existence – and restoring itself. Will the monkey team be able retrieve this strange man's crew and to put an end to the evil before it starts? Or will this legend let his thirst for revenge end everything – including their lives? Guest appearance: Lance Henriksen as Mobius Quint
22	9	"Snowbound"	Ciro Nieli and Fumio Maezono	Brandon Auman & Henry Gilroy	April 16, 2005	208
Snow hits Shuggazoom City and it brings up not only endless questions from Gibson, but weird behavior from Nova. She won't go in the cold and a snowball to the head gets her so flustered, her body temperature alone can melt the snow. When the Hyperforce realizes there are other forces at work, they go beneath the surface to get to the source of the freeze. Haunted by memories of her past, the yellow monkey tries to keep her cool. But when the rest of the team is frozen solid, it's the last straw for Nova, and it's time to see just how powerful one monkey's temper can be...
23	10	"Wonder Fun Meat World"	Ciro Nieli and Fumio Maezono	Brandon Auman	April 23, 2005	110
A new meat joint has opened up in Shuggazoom, and everyone in the city seems to be taken by this eatery. Even Otto is under its spell! But soon things start to get ugly – literally – when meat mutants begin to attack. Could Wonder Fun Meat World be more than it's cracked up to be?
24	11	"The Skeleton King Threat"	Ciro Nieli and Fumio Maezono	Henry Gilroy	April 30, 2005	211
The Monkey Team is finally able to talk to the citizens of Shuggazoom! Now with this new ability, they've decided to let everyone in on the true danger that surrounds them – the Skeleton King threat. Trivia: it is out order on Disney+ on episodes & this also recaps the past episodes on most scenes as it serves like a recap special.
25	12	"Antauri's Masters"	Ciro Nieli and Fumio Maezono	Brandon Auman	May 7, 2005	212
Antauri, sensing a disturbance in the Power Primate, heads off to see the ones who taught him the ways of the mystical energy. Fearful that his friend may not return, Chiro stows away in the Brain Scrambler, and joins Antauri on his mission. But upon arrival, things start to go south as the monkey's master informs him that the "Dark Ones" have returned and that the Power Primate is deteriorating – and proves himself a traitor as well. Now Chiro must fight his way past the temple's guardians to get to Antauri and stop Master Zan. But could the Power Primate be coming to an end? Guest appearance: Michael York as Master Zan
26	13	"I, Chiro"	Ciro Nieli and Fumio Maezono	Henry Gilroy	May 15, 2005	213
The Power Primate is gone and the Dark Ones will soon wreak havoc upon Shuggazoom. All seems lost. But with one last hope, Chiro will have to do the unimaginable to save Shuggazoom, and while most of the team have fallen, the only ones that still stand are Chiro and Antauri. As they battle the Skeleton King and defeating them, Antauri is seriously damaged and wounded by Mandarin, but Chiro defeats him, but, as Skeleton King was reviving, Antauri sacrifices himself to save Chiro, as he gets destroyed, a bolt of lightning gets into Chiro's body, nearly killing him, and nearly stopping reviving Skeleton King. As the team are back again, they wanted to save Chiro, that was uncontrollable going into an unknown region, the savage lands.

=== Season 3 (2005–06) ===
No. overall	No. in season	Title	Directed by	Written by	Original release date	Prod. code
27	1	"The Savage Lands"	Ciro Nieli and Fumio Maezono	Henry Gilroy & Brandon Auman	October 24, 2005	301
28	2	"The Savage Lands"	Alan Wan and Fumio Maezono	Henry Gilroy & Brandon Auman	October 24, 2005	302
After all that has happened, Chiro, now in a strange new form, discovers a whole new world beneath Shuggazoom's surface. As the remaining Monkey Team members and Jinmay search for him, he's on a search of his own... for Antauri. Well, he wants to put Antauri's power primate in the silver monkey suit. When the others finally find him, all they want is for Chiro to come home where he belongs. They are unaware of the greater journey that lies ahead. Guest appearance: Hynden Walch as Valeena
29	3	"Season of the Skull"	Ciro Nieli and Fumio Maezono	Brandon Auman	October 30, 2005	303
In hot pursuit of the Dark One Worm, the Super Robot is mysteriously transported to a strange village where everything is, as Otto puts it, "spook-tacular". The citizens turn to the Monkey Team for help, claiming that they are plagued by a curse that is taking away their little ones. Nova knows it is not true literally but what secrets are these strange people really hiding? Note: This episode is Halloween-inspired. Guest appearance: Angus Scrimm as Magistrate and Cassandra Peterson as Severina
30	4	"A Ghost in the Machinder"	Chris Reccardi and Fumio Maezono	Brandon Auman	November 7, 2005	304
While still on the hunt for the Dark One Worm, the gang is pulled into a massive spaceship by an Artificial Intelligence whose colony was destroyed by Skeleton King, and is now bent on destroying anyone who has something organic. And on top of that, it separates Antauri from the others. Will the Hyperforce find Antauri and beat this A.I. with the aid of the Super Robot which is suddenly displaying an intelligence of its own...? Guest appearance: S. Scott Bullock as the Super Computer
31	5	"The Stranded Seven"	Alan Wan and Fumio Maezono	Mark Henry	November 21, 2005	305
Attacked by a swarm of evil giant praying mantises, the Super Robot crashes on a distant world with nowhere to go. Until the Hyperforce meets the feline inhabitants, that is. It seems the Mantidons have been plaguing them for quite some time, and some look to the team for help while others turn them away. Should the Monkey Team stay and help? And will it make a difference if they do?
32	6	"Girl Trouble"	Chris Reccardi and Fumio Maezono	Mark Henry	December 10, 2005	306
While out joy-riding, Chiro stumbles upon an old space station where he finds two girls that are being held as slaves by a monster. Meanwhile, the girl's father goes to the monkeys for help. But he isn't exactly what he seems to be... Guest appearance: Lacey Chabert as Surthanna, Busy Philipps as Korlianne, and Kurtwood Smith as Ciracus
33	7	"Brother in Arms"	Ciro Nieli and Fumio Maezono	Henry Gilroy	December 16, 2005	307
Still on their journey, Gibson's lecture on wormholes is interrupted when an alien robot mech unexpectedly attacks the Super Robot. The Monkey Team fights back, only to lose Gibson during the battle. Stranded on a strange world, the blue monkey finds that he is not alone – also stranded is a member of the team whose mech attacked them. At first it seems the two will never get along, but when a new enemy arises, can they work together to save their teams – and themselves? Guest appearance: Aaron Ruell as Suupa
34	8	"Monster Battle Club Now!"	Alan Wan and Fumio Maezono	Brandon Auman	December 19, 2005	308
Despite his already impressive combat prowess, it wouldn't hurt if Chiro learned some new moves. So the team heads to a distant planet to visit Nova's former master, only to find it corrupted by the Skeleton King Worm. Luckily, they are able to find Master Offay, who agrees to train Chiro. The leader of the Hyperforce is soon ready to compete in the tournament that will decide the team's freedom, all the while being affected by the planet's corrupted atmosphere. But while searching for a way out Sparx, Nova, Gibson, and Otto make a startling discovery about Nova's former master... Guest appearance: Mako Iwamatsu as Master Offay
35	9	"Meet the Wigglenog"	Chris Reccardi and Fumio Maezono	Brandon Auman	January 1, 2006	310
While playing laser quest inside the super robot, a strange creature called the Wigglenog appears before the team promising to grant their hearts with three wishes. Gibson accidentally wishes that Otto was smarter and finds that he has a gigantic brain. Then the Hyperforce soon discover that with dealing with the Wigglenog, they should be careful what they wish for as when the Wigglenog grants his third wish, he is freed from his cosmic prison to conquer the cosmos! Can The Hyperforce defeat this seemingly all powerful trickster? Guest appearance: John Kassir as the Wigglenog
36	10	"Big Lug"	Ciro Nieli and Fumio Maezono	Randolph Heard	January 16, 2006	309
Desperately in need of fuel, the Hyperforce stops at an intergalactic truck stop, and becomes enthralled with the contents of the stop's store. While the monkeys play around with the merchandise, Chiro stumbles upon the Lug, the stop's tourist attraction. Appalled by the conditions the creature is being kept in, he decides to set it free. But imagine his surprise when he discovers that the "lug" is actually a transformed human – and that the money-hungry owners of the truck stop have turned him into a Lug to replace the old one! When the monkey team look for Chiro, he turned. Can they ever get back to normal? Guest appearance: Diedrich Bader as the Craven gang and Dee Bradley Baker as the Lug
37	11	"Prototype"	Alan Wan and Fumio Maezono	Mark Henry	February 5, 2006	311
Hot on the Dark One's trail, the Super Robot suddenly changes its course to a barren planet stripped of its resources, leaving the Monkey Team baffled. They wind up in a strange laboratory where they encounter a brilliant scientist who has been reduced to nothing but a brain – and claims that he is one of the Super Robot's creators. It turns out that it was the prototype of a long line of fighting robots and the most recent one, the Prometheus Five, that has relentlessly attacking the scientist and his creations. The team sets out to help, but the Super Robot won't seem to let them attack this new robot. In fact, the two actually communicate! And through this, the Hyperforce – and the Robot – learns that there is more to the story than the scientist has told them... Guest appearance: Scott Menville as Slingshot/Prometheus Five
38	12	"Wormhole"	Chris Reccardi and Fumio Maezono	Barry Hawkins	February 13, 2006	312
The time has finally come – the final showdown with the Skeleton King Worm. Armed with explosives and a plan, the Hyperforce readies to face what could be their last battle. But the plan falls apart when the team loses Nova to the Worm...and is dragged through a wormhole to what seems to be a whole other dimension. Can the remaining members of the Hyperforce gets back to normal and defeat the Worm...without Nova? Guest appearance: Jim Cummings as The Being
39	13	"Belly of the Beast"	Ciro Nieli and Fumio Maezono	Brandon Auman	February 20, 2006	313
Finding themselves trapped within the Worm, the Hyperforce struggles to regain their composure after the day's past events. This doesn't keep them from their mission, however. As Antauri sets out, Sparx, Gibson, and Otto deal with the Skeleton King Droid. All the while, Chiro, separated from his teammates finds out that an old foe has survived within the Dark One's digestive tract and is plotting his vengeance. Is all lost for the Monkey Team? Dark One Worm aims to attack planet Earth.

=== Season 4 (2006) ===
No. overall	No. in season	Title	Directed by	Written by	Original release date	Prod. code
40	1	"Galactic Smash" "Space Attack (Part 1)"	Alan Wan and Fumio Maezono	Rich Fogel	September 9, 2006	401
The Monkey Team is recruited to play in the world's most dangerous game: Galactic Smash, by an unknown female warrior who requires their assistance, and a cheat device has claimed that they are the only ones who can save the world. Guest appearance: Tara Strong as Olianna and Arthur Burghardt as the Commodore Game Master
41	2	"Galactic Smash" "Game Over (Part 2)"	Chris Reccardi and Fumio Maezono	Mark Henry	September 16, 2006	402
Chiro and the Monkey Team have been separated, and the Super Robot has been torn into pieces, but with Shuggazoom now as the target in Galactic Smash, Chiro must find a way to reunite his friends and destroy the evil threatening their home world.
42	3	"Incident on Ranger 7"	Ciro Nieli and Fumio Maezono	Brandon Auman	September 23, 2006	403
The Monkey Team runs into an old enemy, Gyrus Krinkle, at the prison on Ranger 7 when Chiro is mysteriously kidnapped and the monkeys must find him.
43	4	"Invasion of the Vreen"	Ciro Nieli and Fumio Maezono	Brandon Auman	September 30, 2006	406
When a race of super evolved insects from the future arrives to conquer Shuggazoom, the Hyperforce has to stop them before they devour everyone in the city. Trivia: This episode premiered out of order as it chronologically takes place after Ghosts of Shuggazoom.
44	5	"Ghosts Of Shuggazoom"	Alan Wan and Fumio Maezono	Robert David	October 7, 2006	404
The monkey team discovers a deserted Shuggazoom City with druid-like creatures called Wraiths until Jinmay arrives to help the team. As things appear to get better, Chiro gets a busted ankle, and the evil Valeena returns for revenge on the monkey team. Will Jinmay and the monkeys save the city?
45	6	"Evil Ages"	Chris Reccardi and Fumio Maezono	Randolph Heard	October 14, 2006	405
The Hyperforce decides to visit the Shuggazoom Museum, which contains past relics and antiques from the city's ancient past. Everything is going fine, until The Curator transports our heroes into the different histories of Shuggazoom! Will they be able to find their way back to the present? Guest appearance: Danny Mann as the Museum Curator and his Ancestors
46	7	"Night of Fear"	Alan Wan and Fumio Maezono	Barry Hawkins	October 21, 2006	407
While patrolling the city, Sparx crash lands the Fist Rocket 3 in front of the Super Robot. When they rescue him they find he has lost his sight. Then Gibson turns into a drooling insane idiot, Antauri starts to lose control of his body, Nova starts to see scary hallucinations, Chiro turns into a little boy, and clam monsters chase Otto. Who could be bring their phobias to life and will the monkeys stop who ever's behind it?
47	8	"The Hills Have Five"	Chris Reccardi and Fumio Maezono	Randolph Heard & Eric Truehart	October 28, 2006	408
A gang named the Wild Five terrorize Shuggazoom, leading to Nova and Jinmay being captured. Chiro, Antauri, Gibson, Otto and Sparx must release the one Wild Five member they caught to find them, not knowing the leader of the Wild Five has reprogrammed Jinmay into one of them. Guest appearance: Henry Rollins as Outrageous and Keith Morris as Hoodie
48	9	"Demon of the Deep"	Chris Reccardi and Fumio Maezono	Mark Henry	November 4, 2006	409
When the Shuggazoom is attacked by aquatic monsters, the Hyperforce are saved by Captain Protesus. He tells the team that the monsters are only the beginning and an ancient demon entombed deep under the sea will awaken by the next dawn. Only the black crystal from the Hostile Depths can save them. But does the Captain want to stop the ancient monster or release it? Guest appearance: John Rhys-Davies as Captain Proteus
49	10	"Secret Society"	Alan Wan and Fumio Maezono	Robert David	November 11, 2006	410
A mysterious underground cult steals the Skeleton King's skull to gain limitless power, leading to a series of curses that fall upon Shuggazoom. The Hyperforce investigates beneath the city to stop the cult and the catastrophes. Meanwhile, witch Valeena and Mandarin set out to the same location to retrieve the skull.
50	11	"Golden Age"	Ciro Nieli and Fumio Maezono	Brandon Auman	November 18, 2006	411
The monkey team picks up a stranger called Captain Shuggazoom. He was the former protector of Shuggazoom and the Alchemist's friend. Will the monkey team finally learn the full truth of their creator? What happens if something dangerous is also awakened along with Captain Shuggazoom? Guest appearance: Bruce Campbell as Captain Shuggazoom
51	12	"Object of Hate (Part 1)"	Alan Wan and Fumio Maezono	Mark Henry	December 9, 2006	412
In order to revive the insidious Skeleton King, Valeena the Skull Sorceress must find three sacred items that represent her master's soul. Learning of this, the Hyperforce and Jinmay set off to find these items before the sorceress does. But getting hold of these items are easier said than done since they might contain more than just power...
52	13	"Soul of Evil (Part 2)"	Ciro Nieli and Fumio Maezono	Brandon Auman	December 16, 2006	413
The Hyperforce are racing against time as Mandarin and Valeena and a newly turned evil Sparx try to retrieve the Soul of Evil, which will help to bring back Skeleton King. Will they succeed and stop them? Will they save Sparx from the darkness? Or is all lost for Shuggazoom and the universe?
