= List of Super Robot Monkey Team Hyperforce Go! characters =

The following is a list of characters in the anime-influenced television show Super Robot Monkey Team Hyperforce Go!, created by Ciro Nieli. The series follows five cyborg monkeys and the human boy Chiro, who awakens them and leads them in protecting the planet of Shuggazoom and the universe from evil.

== The Hyperforce ==
The main cast of Super Robot Monkey Team Hyperforce Go!, consisting of Chiro, Antauri (post-revival), Nova, Gibson, Sparx, and Otto.

- Chiro (チロ, Chiro) (Voiced by: Rica Matsumoto (Japanese); Greg Cipes (English)) is a young teenage boy who awakens the monkeys and becomes leader of the Hyperforce. He possesses the power of the Power Primate, an entity which fused with him following the monkeys' reawakening. Though initially hesitant to lead the Hyperforce, over time he grows into his role and fulfills his destiny as defender of Shuggazoom and the universe while becoming a couple with Jinmay. He pilots Torso Tank Driver 1, which forms the torso and limbs of the Super Robot. In the final episode, he leads the Hyperforce and their allies against the Skeleton King and his army.
- Antauri (アンタウリ, Antauri) (Voiced by: Hidetoshi Nakamura (Japanese); Kevin Michael Richardson (English)) is a black monkey and the team's second-in-command. He is calm, collected, and cares for his friends, being close to Gibson and Sparx, and takes training and his duty seriously, teaching Chiro how to control the Power Primate and advising the Hyperforce. He pilots the Brain Scrambler Pilot 2, which forms the head of the Super Robot, and wields the Ghost Claws, which were parts from the Ghost-Claw Projector. He is killed while battling the Dark Worm, but is resurrected after Chiro transfers his soul into the silver monkey's body.
- Sparx (スパークス, Supākusu) (Full name: SPRX-77) (Voiced by: Koji Ochiai (Japanese); Corey Feldman (English)) is a red monkey and the team's comedian. Though he can be egotistical, he is brave, smart, and willing to protect his comrades, especially Nova, who he has feelings for. He pilots the Fist Rocket 3, which forms the right hand of the Super Robot, and wields the Magnet Hands, which were parts from the Magna-Ball Blazer. In the final two episodes of the series, Sparx becomes evil and helps Mandarin and Valeena collect the objects needed to resurrect Skeleton King. During the ritual, Sparx nearly kills Nova, but she gets through to him and the Hyperforce purifies him with their Power Primates.
- Gibson (ギブソン, Gibuson) (Voiced by: Mitsuaki Hoshino (Japanese); Tom Kenny (English)) is a blue monkey and the team's science officer and medic. He relies on logic and facts and is easily panicked, but does not let this interfere with his duties. He pilots the Fist Rocket 4, which forms the left hand of the Super Robot, and wields the Driller Hands.
- Otto (オットー, Ottō) (Voiced by: Masuo Amada (Japanese); Clancy Brown (English)) is a green monkey and the team's mechanic. Though fun-loving and childish, which can make him appear to be dim-witted, he is skilled with machines and engineering. He pilots the Foot Crusher Cruiser 5, which forms the left foot of the Super Robot, and wields the Energy Saw Hands.
- Nova (ノヴァ, Nova) (Voiced by: Yoko Honna (Japanese); Kari Wahlgren (English)) is a yellow monkey and the team's only female member before Jinmay joins. Nova is the most determined and courageous of the team. As a result of her violent nature, she is known for her short-fused anger, which manifests as an explosion of heat when she is stressed enough. She despises (maybe even fears) the cold due to a traumatizing training exercise Mandarin put her through back when Skeleton King was human. Her main weapon is her Robotic Fists. She pilots the Foot Crusher Cruiser 6 which forms the right foot of the Super Robot.
- Jinmay (ジンメイ, Jinmei) (Voiced by: Chiaki Yurin (Japanese); Ashley Johnson (English)) is a robot girl who Chiro falls in love with. She becomes an official Hyperforce member and its second female member, as well as the protector of Shuggazoom when the Hyperforce leave to destroy the Dark Worm.

== Villains ==
- Skeleton King (Voiced by: Akio Otsuka (Japanese); Mark Hamill (English)), true name The Alchemist, is an undead warlord/sorcerer who resides in the Citadel of Bone, a gigantic living spaceship, and seeks to rule over Shuggazoom and corrupt the monkeys, as well as learn what makes Chiro special, due to his control of the Power Primate. He merges with the Dark One, but is decapitated by the Hyperforce and the Mandarin retrieves his skull. Valeena uses his skull, along with the Alchemist's robe, the Ice Crystal of Vengeance, the Fire of Hate, and the Soul of Evil to resurrect the Skeleton King, who takes on a more powerful form and recreates his empire and his army before preparing to lead them in a final assault on Shuggazoom.
  - The Alchemist is a scientist who created the Hyperforce and erased their memories of their origins, as well as one of the Super Robot's three creators along with Professor Maezono and Dr. Takeuchi. The recorded messages he left behind in his abandoned laboratory inform Chiro that he created the Hyperforce to combat a great evil and help him rebuild the Silver Monkey to revive Antauri. He was once friends with Captain Shuggazoom until he was corrupted by the Dark Ones' influence, becoming the Skeleton King.
- Mandarin (Voiced by: Shiro Saito (Japanese); James Hong (English)) was the orange monkey and the Hyperforce's original leader, who wields orange gauntlets that emit an energy sword and shield and, unlike them, is not a cyborg. After he sought to conquer Shuggazoom, they banished him to an off-world prison called the Hostile Outlaw Observation Prison. There, he remained in a stasis-induced sleep until Chiro activates the signal emitted by his shield, awakening him from his dreams of the deaths of his former teammates. The Mandarin creates clones of Chiro, but is defeated and subsequently replaced with an obedient clone.
- Skull Sorceress (also known as Valeena Sheenko) (voiced by Hynden Walch) is a sorceress who possesses various magical abilities and can summon the Dark One. She was a member of the Skeletal Circle, a secret group of Shuggazoom citizens led by her parents, Ma and Pa Sheenko, who worshipped the Skeleton King. Her parents chose her to accept the Skeleton King's power, as his influence saw her fit to rule the Savage Lands. When the Monkey Team and Jinmay attempt to rescue Chiro from the Skeleton King's jungle, Valeena attempts to kidnap Jinmay and summons the Dark One in an attempt to kill them. After Antauri injures the Dark One, she loses her power and is defeated by Chiro, who tosses her into a vat of ooze as the Savage Lands are destroyed. In the fourth season, Valeena returns and resurrects the Skeleton King, who vaporizes her shortly afterwards.
- Formless Minions are black skeleton-like creatures created from black ooze who act as the foot soldiers of the Skeleton King's army. They ride on motorcycles and have the ability to transform their hands into various weapons and fuse into a gigantic monster.
  There are various versions of the Formless, including:
  - the regular Formless Soldier
  - the Hyperformless – A group of Formless in the five colors of the Robot Monkeys, created to counteract the powers of the Hyperforce, but are destroyed by their new moves. The Black Hyperformless shoots massive spikes from its chest, the Red Hyperformless has gigantic battle cuffs for hands, the Blue Hyperformless has sharp blade-like hands, the Green Hyperformless has a gigantic hammer-shaped head, and the Yellow Hyperformless has massive cleated boots.
  - the Red Crystal-bearing Formless Soldier – Can shoot fireballs and regenerate from their wounds.
  - the Formless Chiro Clones (voiced by Greg Cipes)
  - the Formless Chiro Mutants (voiced by Greg Cipes) – Hybrids of Chiro and various animals.
  - Chira and Chiru (voiced by Greg Cipes) – Two muscular female versions of Chiro, who refer to each other as sisters and are referred to as twins by their creator.
  - Chiro Blob – A blob-like mass in Chiro's likeness.
  - Formless Slugs
  - Winged Formless
  - Giant Formless
  - Formless Spider
  - Formless Sea Serpent
  - Formless Tyrannosaurus
  - Primitive Formless: A Neanderthal-like Formless that adapted to the harsh jungles of the Savage Lands and serve as Valeena's guardians.
  - Formless Magma: Volcanic magma/lava utilized by the Skeleton King.
- TV Monster / Skeleton King Droid (voiced by Mark Hamill) is a robot and the Skeleton King's herald, who carries his essence and does his work due to him being unable to leave the Citadel. It has a large monitor at its center which displays the Skeleton King. Though defeated at the end of the first season, it returns in the third season, where it is abducted by an infected robot mind who seeks to destroy everything that was in contact with the Skeleton King. No longer able to ferry Skeleton King's essence around, the TV Monster fuses with the remnants of the robot mind, becoming the Skeleton King Droid. At the end of the third season, it is destroyed by the Super Robot and Mandarin converts it into a ship.
- Elevator Monster (voiced by Clancy Brown) is a psychic being that serves the Skeleton King and has the ability to fuse with the elevator and teleport. It is defeated by Sparx with his Magna-Tingler Blast.
- Gyrus Krinkle (voiced by Jeffrey Combs) is a man who is skilled with technology. He grew up with an unloving robot mother and is a big fan of the Hyperforce, which became an obsession. He was originally part of the cleanup crew that cleaned the city after the Hyperforce's battles with monsters, but was fired because he was cleaning the Super Robot instead of the city and because his boss felt that his fanaticism was becoming an unhealthy obsession. His failed attempt to join the Hyperforce leads him to sneak into the Super Robot and hypnotize the Monkey Team into fighting the real Chiro. However, he frees them from his control and defeats him, after which he is sent to Moonbase Theta Prison Complex on Ranger 7. He returns in Season 4, when he takes over the facility and captures Chiro in his mind using the Neuro-Matter Reconfigutron, which converts matter to brainwaves. When he sends the Monkey Team into his mental world, they shatter it by attacking fissures that appear when he is angry, after which he disappears into the Reconfigutron before it explodes. After his apparent death, a picture he painted becomes a picture of himself and the Hyperforce, sans Chiro, in action poses.
- Professor Maezono (voiced by Dee Bradley Baker) is a disembodied brain who was one of the creators of the Super Robot, secretly building models of it for his evil plans. When Slingshot was created as the last generation of Super Robots, he attempted to fuse with the Robot. When his friend Dr. Takeuchi tried to stop him, his brain triggered an explosion that destroyed his lab and killed Takeuchi. From then on, he was locked in combat with Slingshot, who vowed to avenge Takeuchi's death. When the Monkey Team arrive on the planet, Maezono tricks them into trying to destroy Slingshot, who helps them defeat him before leaving to pursue him after he escapes.
- Sakko (voiced by Tom Kenny) is a spy for the Skeleton King who is taken away before returning at the end of the first season and partnering with Mandarin. Some time after he and Mandarin abandon the Skeleton King, he was sent to the prison on Ranger 7.
- Flytor (voiced by Tom Kenny) is a fusion of a mutated fly, crab, and plant who was created to scan Chiro's genetic blueprint and learn what makes him special.
- Dread Magician Nodnarb (voiced by Clancy Brown)
- Lord Skurg (voiced by Wil Wheaton)
- Biff Beefy Box / Cloggy Colon Creature (voiced by Kevin Michael Richardson) is the alien manager and mascot of Wonder Fun Meat World, an intergalactic fast food restaurant chain. In reality, he is the Cloggy Colon Creature, a monster who seeks to make people fat with his meat products so he can devour them. He arrives at Shuggazoom City with its store of meat, which hypnotizes those who eat it into eating obsessively, making them vulnerable to being eaten. After his true form is revealed and his plans discovered, he is defeated and launched into the sun by the Super Robot. He is later sent to the Ranger 7 prison along with Sakko.
- Scrapperton (voiced by Eric Idle and Jeff Bennett) is a cyborg servant of the Skeleton King and a collector of junk.
- Morlath (voiced by Kevin Michael Richardson) is a gigantic frost demon who was trapped in a cavern in the Sea of Ice outside of Shuggazoom City until he encountered the Skeleton King, who offered to free him if he froze the city, but in reality sought to use his ice magic for himself. In season 4, when Valeena, Mandarin, and the Hyperforce seek to find the Ice Crystal of Vengeance, Morlath attacks them to prevent them from obtaining it, but is killed after Super Robot destroys the cavern with him inside.
- Master Zan (voiced by Michael York) is Antauri's master and the leader of the Verron Mystics, a group of powerful mystics who banished the Dark Ones to the Netherworld to stop their invasion of the universe. He and the Mystics chose to serve the Dark Ones and their emissary, the Skeleton King, after realizing the power they possessed, causing the corruption of the Power Primate. He is defeated after the Hyperforce overload the magical contraption responsible for corrupting the Power Primate, which destroys the Verron Temple.
- VX-808 Modular Computer Tracking Probe (voiced by S. Scott Bullock)
- Wigglenog (voiced by John Kassir)
- Craven Brothers (voiced by Diedrich Bader)
- Varkon Commodore (voiced by Arthur Burghardt)
- Vreen
- The Curator (voiced by Danny Mann) is the eccentric owner of the Shuggazoom History Museum which was closed for years until the Hyperforce get their own exhibit for their heroic deeds. He believes history is interesting when evil triumphs over good and has several ancestors: a medieval knight that killed several in witch trials, a western outlaw that wiped a town off the map, and a caveman implied to be responsible for the dinosaurs' extinction. To ensure that he goes down in history, he turns the museum and its exhibits into a hub of a pocket-dimension so copies of his ancestors and several ancient torture devices could destroy the Hyperforce. However, this plan backfires when his creations are defeated and he ends up in a pocket dimension of modern Shuggazoom City that formed from the newest exhibit. After the Hyperforce, thanks to Antauri, find the exit and return to reality, they find a new figurine of the Curator in the Hyperforce Exhibit.
- The Wild Five (Outrageous voiced by Henry Rollins, Hoodie voiced by Keith Morris, Squatch voiced by Kari Wahlgren, Mighty Klaw and Pigphase voiced by Dee Bradley Baker)
- Captain Proteus (voiced by John Rhys-Davies)
- Ma (voiced by Kari Wahlgren) and Pa Sheenko (voiced by Clancy Brown) are the leaders of the Skeletal Circle and Valeena's parents, who chose her to accept Skeleton King's power.
- The Dark Ones are a species of evil entities with the power to destroy creation who were created by a cosmic force when the universe was young. While many were confined in the Netherworld, some are dormant in their planets' cores. Due to their evil, organic life is weakened in the Netherworld.

== Allies ==
- The Sun Riders (Super Quasar voiced by Keone Young, Aurora Six voiced by Meredith Salenger, Johnny Sunspot voiced by Tom Kenny) are a superhero team consisting of its leader Super Quasar, Aurora Six, who wields the Sun Gun, and Johnny Sunspot, their kid sidekick and genius who builds their weapons and wields special gloves that create dark energy orbs. They use the Sun Cycles for transportation and have a robot called the Nebutron. They have their own television series, of which Chiro is an avid fan. However, they wanted to stop pretending to be superheroes and joined the Skeleton King to receive power in return for destroying Chiro and the Hyperforce. They later return with a more powerful Nebutron ship, which they later sacrifice for the good of others, and aid the Hyperforce in the final battle against the resurrected Skeleton King and his army.
- Slingshot (voiced by Scott Menville), also known as Prometheus Five, is the fifth and most recent in a series of robots, with Super Robot being the first. He has the power of flight and can create energy balls from his hands and propel himself at high speed. Shortly after Slingshot was completed, one of his creators, Professor Maezono, attempted to transplant his brain into his body. However, his partner, Dr. Takeuchi, removed the power cord during the process to stop him. The resulting overload caused an explosion that killed Takauchi and reduced Maezono to a disembodied brain. Slingshot blames Maezono for Takauchi's death and has been battling him ever since.
- Planetoid Q (voiced by Clancy Brown) is a living planetesimal that the Skeleton King orders to collide with Shuggazoom. Chiro later convinces Planetoid Q to make its own decisions rather than following his commands.
- The Circus of Ooze Crew (the Ringmaster voiced by Robert Englund, Leeah the Jungle Girl voiced by Kari Wahlgren) is a traveling circus whose members were turned evil after a run-in with the Citadel of Bone, which shot Formless ooze into the train. They attempt to use the ooze to turn the citizens of Shuggazoom into clown slaves and make the monkeys part of the circus. When the ringmaster becomes a giant carousel, Otto uses his saws to cut down the carousel. The Circus of Ooze offer him a starring role in their next show.
- Thingy (voiced by Frank Welker) is a small furry alien that the team rescues from Ranger 7, which turns out to be a trap set by the Skeleton King. Though it can transform into a giant monster, it is not evil by nature, and its lick is a repellent for the Skeleton King's virus.
- Mobius Quint (voiced by Lance Henriksen) is a galaxy-class pilot who meets the Hyperforce when they find the wreckage of his ship The Last Chance, which was destroyed by fragments of the Citadel, floating in space. They aid him in rescuing his crew from being consumed by the ship, but he falls under the control of the Citadel and becomes consumed with revenge. He takes the Super Robot's neutron generator in an attempt to destroy the Citadel, but Chiro saves him. He later appears to aid the Hyperforce in the final battle against the resurrected Skeleton King and his army.
- Captain Shuggazoom (voiced by Bruce Campbell) was the previous defender of Shuggazoom City, whose true identity is industrialist Clayton Carrington and who fights against his nemesis, Doctor Malicious. After the Alchemist warned him of the threat of the Dark Ones and took him to the Netherworld to monitor them, Mandarin damaged the containment grid, releasing the Demon Beast. Though he defeated the Demon Beast using the Sleep Cannon and put it into hibernation, he seemingly died after falling into a cavern below. Sixty years later, he is discovered after the Hyperforce picks up his heat signature from the cavern while searching for Mandarin and Valeena. After being revived, he is informed of what happened since then and of the Alchemist's turn to evil. He aids the Hyperforce in defeating the Demon Beast after it is accidentally released, in hopes of redeeming himself after believing that he abandoned the Alchemist in his hour of need. After the battle, he returns to the Alchemist's laboratory and discovers a computerized message he left behind, learning of his transformation into the Skeleton King. There, Valeena and Mandarin attack him and succeed in stealing the Alchemist's robe despite him calling on the Hyperforce for help. Afterwards, he enters the Super Robot's Healing Chamber to recover.
- Master Offay (voiced by Mako) is the master of an interplanetary dojo on Galaxia and Nova's martial arts trainer. The Hyperforce meets him on their quest to destroy the Skeleton King Worm and discovers that Galaxia was corrupted by the Dark One's passage, turing its inhabitants into mindless monsters that fight in the Monster Battle Club. Nova is devastated to find that Offay has been infected as well, but has done his best to fight off the control. When Chiro is infected by Galaxia's corrupted atmosphere, Offay helps him control his monster form by training him in the ancient ways of Monster Fighting. After advancing through the tournament, he learns that the Warlord, the head champion and creator of the tournament, is Offay, whose mind was warped by the Skeleton King Worm's power. He brings him to his senses, using his teachings and the Power Primate to subdue him. He later appears to aid the Hyperforce in the final battle against the resurrected Skeleton King and his army.
- Olliana (voiced by Tara Strong) enlists the Hyperforce's help in stopping the evil gamer Commodore, who seeks to destroy planets to get the highest score in the interstellar game "Galactic Smash". She later appears to aid the Hyperforce in the final battle against the resurrected Skeleton King and his army.

== Shuggazoom citizens ==
- BT and Glenny (voiced by Tom Kenny and Greg Cipes) are teenagers and acquaintances of Chiro.
- Mr. Gackslapper (voiced by Clancy Brown) is a cook and owner of the fast-food restaurant "Hoverburgers".
- Nerd Kid and Mr. Cheepers (voiced by Tom Kenny) are a man in red glasses and his stuffed penguin.
