= Three's a Crowd (disambiguation) =

Three's a Crowd is a television comedy series.

Three's a Crowd may also refer to:

== Media ==
=== Film and television ===
- Three's a Crowd (1927 film), an American comedy film
- Three's a Crowd (1932 film), a Merrie Melodies animated film
- Three's a Crowd (1945 film), an American mystery film
- Three's a Crowd (1969 film), an ABC TV movie that aired in December
- Three's a Crowd (game show), an American television game show which aired from 1979–1980
- "Three's a Crowd" (Joe 90), episode 17 of Joe 90, which aired in January 1969
- "Three's a Crowd" (The Liver Birds), a 1971 television episode
- "Three's a Crowd", a 1983 episode of the American TV sitcom Silver Spoons
- "Three's a Crowd" (Degrassi High), a 1991 television episode
- "Three's a Crowd" (Sex and the City), a 1998 television episode
- "Three's a Crowd", a 1999 episode of the American animated children’s musical television series PB&J Otter
- "Three's a Crowd", a 2000 episode of the Canadian-American animated children’s television series Caillou
- "Three's a Crowd", a 2000 episode of the Canadian-American animated children’s television series Dragon Tales
- "Three's a Crowd", a 2002 episode of the American children’s superhero television series Power Rangers Wild Force
- "Three's a Crowd / A is for Angry", a 2005 episode of Arthur
- "Three's a Crowd", a 2009 episode of the American superhero animated television series Transformers: Animated
- "Three's a Crowd" (My Little Pony: Friendship Is Magic), a 2014 episode of My Little Pony: Friendship Is Magic
- "Three's a Crowd", a 2015 episode of the American animated children’s television series Goldie & Bear
- "Three's a Crowd" (Masters of Sex), a 2015 television episode
- Three's a Crowd, a working title of The Talk of the Town

=== Music ===
- 3's a Crowd (band), 1960s Canadian folk-rock band
- Three's a Crowd (musical), a 1930 Broadway musical revue
- "Three's a Crowd" (song), a 1992 song by Milira
- "Three's a Crowd", a jazz piece recorded by the Dave Brubeck Quartet for the 1961 album Countdown—Time in Outer Space

=== Radio ===
- Three's a Crowd (audio drama), a 2005 audio drama based on the TV series Doctor Who
