= Super Robot Monkey Team Hyperforce Go! =

2000s American animated television series

- Genre: Action; Adventure; Comedy drama; Mecha; Science fiction; Superhero
- Created by: Ciro Nieli
- Directed by: Ciro Nieli; Fumio Maezono; Alan Wan (S3–4); Chris Reccardi (S3–4)
- Voices of: Greg Cipes; Kevin Michael Richardson; Tom Kenny; Kari Wahlgren; Clancy Brown; Corey Feldman; Mark Hamill; Ashley Johnson; James Hong; Hynden Walch
- Opening theme: "Main Title Theme"; by Polysics
- Ending theme: "Main Title Theme" (instrumental)
- Composer: Sebastian Evans II
- Countries of origin: United States; Japan
- Original language: English
- No. of seasons: 4
- No. of episodes: 52 (list of episodes)

Production
- Executive producers: Ciro Nieli; Henry Gilroy (S1–2)
- Editor: Ted Supa
- Running time: 20 minutes
- Production company: Jetix Animation Concepts

Original release
- Network: Jetix (ABC Family)
- Release: September 18, 2004 – February 20, 2006
- Network: Jetix (Toon Disney)
- Release: September 9 – December 16, 2006

Super Robot Monkey Team Hyperforce Go! (Note: Japanese: スーパー・ロボット・モンキー・チーム・ハイパーフォース GO!, Hepburn: Sūpā Robotto Monkī Chīmu Haipāfōsu GO!) (also known as SRMTHFG or simply Super Robot Monkey Team) is an American animated television series created by Ciro Nieli. It was produced by Walt Disney Television Animation, with animation being done by The Answer Studio in Japan, and is thus sometimes considered an anime because of it. The series was the first original show produced for the Jetix block and for the Jetix and Disney channels worldwide, where the show premiered on September 18, 2004. It ran for four seasons composed of 52 episodes, each 22 minutes long.

Set on the fictional planet of Shuggazoom, the series follows the adventures of five cyborg monkeys and a human boy named Chiro as they work to protect their planet – and the rest of the universe – from the forces of evil.

== Overview ==
=== Setting ===
Super Robot Monkey Team Hyperforce Go! is set in Shuggazoom City, a city that takes up a good portion of its planet, also named Shuggazoom. The rest of the planet is divided into sparsely or entirely uninhabited zones. The largest of these making up the majority of the visible surface outside of the city is "The Zone of Wasted Years" which is a barren wasteland.

=== Plot ===
The series follows the adventures of a young boy named Chiro, who stumbled upon a giant abandoned Super Robot partially overgrown with plants but still accessible. Once inside, his curiosity got the better of him, and he pulls an old power switch among a series of stasis tanks. In doing so, he awakened the five robotic monkeys that form the ledgendary Super Robot Monkey Team. In the process Chiro also fused himself with the mysterious supernatural energy of the Power Primate, allowing him to transform into a stronger, braver warrior and the new leader of the team. With the aid of the five Robot Monkeys: Sparx, Antauri, Gibson, Otto and Nova, their mission is to protect Shuggazoom City from the evil Skeleton King, the main villain of the series, as well as any other evil forces that may threaten it. But since Chiro was not born a superhero, or with any enhanced abilities, the Monkeys take up training him to hone his abilities which results in him leading the team. With each member possessing a different set of skills Chiro acts as a unifying force keeping them on point where they otherwise might fall to differing opinions, in addition to being familiar with the current culture of Shuggazoom. With the Monkeys continuing to train Chiro he grows into the leader they need with the potential to fulfill his greater destiny as protector of the universe. When battling larger enemies, the Hyperforce uses the Super Robot, which can operate as a single entity or split into six separate vehicles for versatility. Its main attack, when combined as the whole robot, is "Lasertron Fury"; a powerful energy beam that is fired from its chest and is capable of destroying large objects or hostile entities, while an array of smaller weaponry is used to handle other lesser threats. The Super Robot also serves as Chiro and the Monkeys' headquarters and home while parked on its landing pad in Shuggazoom City.

Over the course of the series the history of both Shuggazoom and the Robot Monkeys is expanded upon revealing they were created long ago specifically to combat the evil Skeleton King by a brilliant inventor known only as the Alchemist, who having unintentionally released a great evil into the cosmos with his experiments, the Hyperforce was his attempt to prepare for an uncertain future where defenses would be needed. The team itself also expands as the series progresses to include various allies and a rogue's gallery of enemies as recurring characters.

== Voice cast ==
=== Main ===
- Greg Cipes as Chiro
- Kevin Michael Richardson as Antauri
- Tom Kenny as Gibson
- Kari Wahlgren as Nova
- Clancy Brown as Otto
- Corey Feldman as Sparx
- Mark Hamill as Skeleton King
- Ashley Johnson as Jinmay
- James Hong as Mandarin

=== Recurring ===
- Hynden Walch as Sorceress Valeena
- Jeff Bennett and Eric Idle as Lord Scrapperton
- Jeffrey Combs as Gyrus Krinkle
- Mark Hamill as Skeleton King Droid
- Arthur Burghardt as Commodore Game Master
- Tara Strong as Alliana

== Production ==
Super Robot Monkey Team Hyperforce Go! was created by director and producer Ciro Nieli. The series was first pitched to Nickelodeon, and was to be produced under Nickelodeon Animation Studios, but they turned it down after the September 11 attacks, not wanting to produce a show that featured frequent urban destruction. Nieli also pitched the show to Cartoon Network under Cartoon Network Studios, who also passed on the project due to perceived similarities to The Powerpuff Girls. The series was eventually pitched to Disney, who agreed to produce the project.

The series is influenced by Japanese animation. It is also inspired by Star Trek, Super Sentai, Power Rangers, Voltron, and Star Wars. Animator and designer Lynne Naylor served as the art director. Her husband, Chris Reccardi, was the assistant director. The art style was a tribute to classic anime, such as Speed Racer, Astro Boy, and Cyborg 009, and was influenced by the works of Ken Ishikawa, Go Nagai, Sanpei Shirato, Shotaro Ishinomori, and Osamu Tezuka. Other crew members include Tad Stones, Greg Weisman, Eric Trueheart, Rich Fogel, Chris Mitchell, and Kevin Hopps. Sebastian Evans composed the musical score, while the theme song was performed by Japanese synthpop/new wave band Polysics.

== Release ==
=== Broadcast ===
Super Robot Monkey Team Hyperforce Go! premiered on ABC Family's Jetix programming block on September 18, 2004. It also aired on Toon Disney's Jetix block, until the Jetix programming block was taken off of ABC Family in August 2006, and the series began to air exclusively on Toon Disney. The show was planned to air on ABC Kids on September 17, 2005, but it was scrapped. It was shown on Jetix UK from January 1, 2005, until July 22, 2006. In 2005, Super Robot Monkey Team Hyperforce Go! aired on Champ TV in South Korea. The entire series was broadcast in the United Kingdom on GMTV's Toonattik. In Ireland, it was released on RTÉ Two as part of "The Den" children's programming block. In 2007, the series was released on Mio TV in Singapore.

The series was produced for widescreen, but originally shown cropped due to network restrictions. A line of action figures based on the show was produced by Hasbro in 2006.

=== Home media ===
A Game Boy Advance Video Pak containing two episodes of the show released in April 2005. The show was added to the Disney+ streaming library in July 2020.

== Reception ==
=== Critical response ===
Shreya Suresh Kumar of ComingSoon.net said, "This series has a perfect blend of humor, action, and sci-fi elements, making it an exciting experience. It features a stellar voice cast with Greg Cipes, Kevin Michael Richardson, Tom Kenny, and Kari Wahlgren. It is a series that appeals to everyone, from children to adults." Charlotte Gorrell of MovieWeb stated, "It is a great series for the entire family, and a great introduction to science fiction for a young audience. At the same time, the humor in the one-liners appeals to a more adult audience. It uses the same personalities and eccentric imagery that are popular in anime. The futuristic world, mixed with a bright colors and a relatable protagonist, combines into a great family-friendly series."

=== Accolades ===
The series was nominated for Best Sound Editing in Television Animated at the 2006 Golden Reel Awards. It was nominated for Best Sound Editing in Sound Effects, Foley, Dialogue, ADR and Music for Television Animation at the 2007 Golden Reel Awards.

== Possible revival ==
In December 2014, across an interview with AnimeSuperhero.com, Ciro Nieli stated, "There's a finale planned for that and I don't know how I'm gonna do it but I swear that I'm gonna do it someday. I can do it as one movie or I can do it as a whole season, it just depends on how much breadth I want to give it. Look at the last episode. You can either pick it up from there or you can go 'Five years later: it's the war of the undead vs the robot chimps.' It's this crazy battlefield where all forces have kinda teamed up against the ultimate evil. It'd be awesome. It's all figured out pretty much. Everyone bugs me about it all the time and I really wanna sit down and tell everybody what happens but I'd rather just make it someday and give it to them. Worst case scenario: before I die I'll do a perfect graphic novel of it and then Disney can sue me posthumously 'cause they now completely own it and that's how it goes. I guess I could make a comic and change the names and hairdos..." In June 2018, Greg Cipes shared one of Ciro Nieli's concept art on Twitter, as it could be either a reboot or continuation for a fifth season, while showing off two new characters set to appear. As of November 2026, there has yet to be updates about the show's revival.

In March 2025, Greg Cipes announced he has Parkinson's disease as he shared on his Twitter. it is unknown if he will return to reprise his role as Chiro in the revival.

In March 2026, Bruce Campbell the voice of Captain Shuggazoom announced he was diagnosed with "a type of cancer that's 'treatable' not 'curable'" its unknown if he will return to reprise his role again for the revival.
