= Sebastian Evans (composer) =

American composer for film and TV

- Origin: Alameda County, California
- Genres: Orchestral, cinematic, hip-hop, classical, ambient
- Occupations: Composer, arranger, instrumentalist
- Instruments: Piano, guitar, bass, drums
- Years active: 2004–present

Sebastian Evans II is an American composer for film and television. He is best known for providing the score for Super Robot Monkey Team Hyperforce Go!, Transformers: Animated, Ben 10: Omniverse and the 2012 Teenage Mutant Ninja Turtles series.

== Biography ==
Growing up in Alameda County, Evans spent much of his childhood in Oakland and San Leandro. From an early age he would play his family's pots and pans as if they were drums, his musical tendencies eventually prompted his parents to purchase a Casio SK-8 keyboard. As a child, Evans saw Return of the Jedi during its theatrical release. He cites the scene in which Admiral Ackbar says, "It's a trap!" as the moment he decided to become a composer.

Evans's composing career began after a chance encounter with artist and animator Ciro Nieli while waiting in line for Star Wars: The Phantom Menace at Mann's Chinese theater, Evans was offered an opportunity to compose the score for Super Robot Monkey Team Hyperforce Go!. This was his first professional job as a composer.

== Career ==
On his philosophy towards composing, Evans has stated, "...Writing a song is a bit one-sided as far as perspective goes… When I write for TV and film, it's not just self expression. I'm trying to convey moods, tones, and emotions from multiple perspectives. There's a little more 'extrospection' required."

Evans describes his influences as vast and wide-ranging, citing Tchaikovsky, Michael Nyman and the Beastie Boys as examples. He has stated that rhythm is a driving force behind his compositions. Evans has also said he typically starts his scores with piano, later adding in or changing the sound to other instruments. Occasionally, he will use unorthodox, non-orchestral instruments in his scores, such as a theremin. In an interview with Patch.com, Evans explained that though he draws on both the original TMNT series as well as the original movies in his score, the latter is a greater source of inspiration. His favorite Ninja Turtle is Donatello.

In addition to his work on Teenage Mutant Ninja Turtles, Evans has provided the score for Ben 10: Omniverse, Transformers: Animated, The Drinky Crow Show and D.C. Super Friends. Evans was featured on BuzzFeed as one of the top composers working in animation today.

== Discography ==
=== Film ===
Year(s)	Title	Notes
2006	Southern Justice	
2010	DC Super Friends: The Joker's Playhouse	
2010	Erostratus	

=== Television ===
Year(s)	Title	Notes
2004–2006	Super Robot Monkey Team Hyperforce Go!	
2007–2009	Transformers: Animated	
2008–2009	The Drinky Crow Show	
2012–2014	Ben 10: Omniverse	
2012–2017	Teenage Mutant Ninja Turtles	Also theme song composer with Stanley Martinez
