= Crowd (disambiguation) =

A crowd is a large and definable group of people.

Crowd or The Crowd or crowding may also refer to:

== Films ==
- The Crowd (1928 film), an American silent film directed by King Vidor
- The Crowd (1951 film), an Italian film

== Literature ==
- The Crowd: A Study of the Popular Mind, an 1895 book by Gustave Le Bon
- "The Crowd", a short story by Ray Bradbury included in his collection The October Country

== Music ==
- Crowd (musical instrument), a Celtic musical instrument
- The Crowd (band), a 1985 British supergroup
- The Crowd (Nathan King album), 2008
- The Crowd (Rova Saxophone Quartet album), 1986
- "The Crowd", a song by the Cat Empire from the album The Cat Empire
- "The Crowd", a song by Roy Orbison

== People ==
- Crowd Lu (born 1985), a Taiwanese indie singer and songwriter

== Science and medicine ==
- Crowding of the teeth
- Macromolecular crowding
- Visual crowding

== Visual arts ==
- The Crowd (Lewis), a painting by Wyndham Lewis, 1914–1915

== See also ==
- Three's a Crowd (disambiguation)
