= List of Transformers: Animated episodes =

The episodes of Transformers: Animated are split into a set of 3 seasons, 13 episodes in each with the first season bearing a special movie-length (later divided into a 3-episode showing) beginning. An episode list for the first two seasons (a combined total of 26 episodes) has been released through Cartoon Network's website. Both the series' first season and the entire series itself began with "Transform and Roll Out", a 90-minute movie special starting point later broken up into three episodes for re-runs. Following the debut of the movie on December 26, 2007, the series properly began on January 5 next year. The series returned with the third season on March 14, 2009 in the US and Canada.

== Series overview ==
Season	Episodes	Originally released	
Season	Episodes	First released	Last released
1	16	December 26, 2007	April 5, 2008
2	13	April 12, 2008	July 5, 2008
3	13	March 14, 2009	May 23, 2009

== Episodes ==
=== Season 1 (2007–08) ===
The first season (consisting of sixteen episodes - a movie-length beginning later divided into a 3-part story and 13 ordinary episodes afterward) began on December 26, 2007, with its movie-length/later three-part premiere "Transform and Roll Out", and ended on April 5, 2008, with part 2 of "Megatron Rising". The season's main theme following "Transform and Roll Out" centered primarily around Megatron's return after his defeat during his first battle with Optimus Prime. Meanwhile, the Autobots (Optimus, Bumblebee, Ratchet, Prowl, and Bulkhead) learn more about 22nd-century Earth from eight-year-old human Sari Sumdac, who has an encounter with the AllSpark that transforms her security key into a mystical Cybertronian artifact with vast powers. At the same time, the Autobots battle members of Megatron's old crew, including Starscream, Blackarachnia, Lugnut, and Blitzwing, while befriending some of the local humans, including Sari, her father, Professor Isaac Sumdac (who is tricked into helping Megatron) and machine-hating police officer Captain Fanzone.

No. overall	No. in season	Title	Directed by	Written by	Original release date
1	1	"Transform and Roll Out: Part One"	Matt Youngberg, Yutaka Kagawa	Marty Isenberg	December 26, 2007
2	2	"Transform and Roll Out: Part Two"	Matt Youngberg, Minoru Yamaoka	Marty Isenberg	December 26, 2007
3	3	"Transform and Roll Out: Part Three"	Matt Youngberg, Makoto Fuchigami	Marty Isenberg	December 26, 2007
A small repair crew of five Autobots, consisting of team leader Optimus Prime, hotshot Bumblebee, lumbering Bulkhead, ninja loner Prowl, and grumpy Cybertronian War veteran and medic Ratchet, find an artifact called the Allspark among meteors when clearing a space bridge in an asteroid field. The crew is attacked by Decepticons including Megatron and Starscream and are refused assistance from Cybertron. Megatron flies to the repair crew's ship, but an explosive device planted on him by Starscream results in the ship and Megatron crashing to Earth, at separate points. A scientist named Professor Isaac Sumdac discovers Megatron's severed head while the Autobots land in Lake Erie, going into stasis as their ship plunges to the bottom of the lake. 50 earth years later, in the city of Detroit, Sumdac has developed an array of robots to help carry out duties in the city. A nanotech demonstration by Sumdac results in a roach mutating into a giant monster, which local police and SWAT are unable to combat as it absorbs nearby objects. The Autobots are accidentally awoken from their stasis via the entry of a sample of the monster's material that lands inside their ship. Taking on new robot/vehicle modes to hide themselves while at the scene, the Autobots come out of hiding before the eyes of everyone present to battle and defeat the nanotech creature, and also meet Isaac's daughter Sari Sumdac, a spunky 8-year-old girl, who convinced Bumblebee to take her with him to their ship. Once down there, Sari finds the Allspark and her security key card is transformed by it into a transformable key capable of healing Cybertronian injuries and also restoring other related issues — Prowl is severely injured during the Autobots' first Earth fight and healed by this method. The Autobots become the city's "Cybernetic Superheroes" as a result of being seen by and saving humanity, and put their skills to work by helping people. Meanwhile, Starscream arrives on Earth seeking the Allspark for himself; to obtain it, he takes hostages, including Prof. Sumdac, Bumblebee, the mayor of New Detroit, and police Captain Fanzone. Starscream claims the hostages will not be harmed if the Autobots relinquish the AllSpark. While the others rescue the hostages, Optimus battles Starscream to the death, which ends with Starscream being sent flying and Optimus dying from the battle. Sari uses her Allspark key to restore Optimus to life, a capability never expected by anyone. Some hours later, Sumdac is alone in his lab – with the head and hand of Megatron, the source of his robotics empire.
4	4	"Home Is Where the Spark Is"	Matt Youngberg and Shunji Ôga	Michael Ryan	January 5, 2008
The Autobots continue to defend Detroit while making their home in the abandoned automobile plant that Sari set them up in. She accidentally uses her key to revive Megatron's head, who promptly learns of Starscream's betrayal. Discovering that he is capable of controlling the machines in the area, Megatron controls a small "Pocket-Bot" to search for the AllSpark in the Autobots' Earth base, but when he doesn't find it, he takes control of the machinery in the plant to destroy the Autobots. They hold their own against the challenges they are faced with, eventually emerging victorious through Bumblebee's sabotage of the machinery's central system which instantly brings it all to a stop, and ponder who could have controlled the "Pocket-Bot" in the first place. Absents: Lugnut, Blitzwing, Blackarachnia, Capt. Fanzone
5	5	"Blast from the Past"	Irineo Maramba, Ben Jones, and Kentaro Mizuno	Kevin Hopps	January 12, 2008
Megatron reveals himself to Prof. Sumdac and tricks the inventor into thinking that he is an Autobot. He then helps Sumdac in reprogramming some robotic dinosaurs after Bulkhead accidentally destroys them at a robotic theme park. While Sumdac tries to rebuild them, Prowl teaches Bulkhead how to 'think and move'. Behind Sumdac's back, Megatron upgrades these Dinobots – Grimlock (a Tyrannosaurus), Snarl (a Triceratops) and Swoop (a Pteranodon) – to become his new attack drones. But during their rampage, both Ratchet and Bumblebee try to use an electromagnetic pulse attack to disable them. However, Sari's key gets pulled into the mix, which gives the Dinobots a small semblance of "a spark". Megatron tricks them into attacking the Autobots because "Cars bad. Cars that turn into robots worse."; this forces the Autobots to battle them - it is during this fight that Bulkhead proves to be exactly what the Autobots need to stop the Dinobots, his muscle more than a match for the Dinobots' muscle. Sumdac thinks it would be better to dismantle the Dinobots, and Prime agrees, but Prowl (who senses a life force inside them) and Bulkhead, without Prime's knowledge, take the Dinobots to an island in the middle of Lake Erie where they can exist peacefully. After Prowl and Bulkhead leave, Grimlock unexpectedly transforms to robot mode, to other Dinobots' disbelief. Absents: Starscream, Lugnut, Blitzwing, Blackarachnia
6	6	"Thrill of the Hunt"	Ben Jones and Shunji Ôga	Andrew Robinson	January 19, 2008
Ratchet remembers the time when he served in the Cybertronian War as a field medic. During the fighting, he was sent to rescue an Intelligence agent named Arcee who was injured during the fighting. The intelligence codes she possessed could have turned the war in the Decepticons' favor. For that reason, Megatron sent Lockdown to capture her, snagging Ratchet in the process. In order for the Decepticons not to receive the codes, Arcee told Ratchet to use his EMP generator to wipe out the codes. He reluctantly obeyed and the aftermath is Acree having lost her memory and Lockdown having gained Ratchet's EMP generator. Back in the present, Lockdown has resurfaced and uses Ratchet's EMP generator to capture Optimus Prime. Recruited by Blitzwing and Lugnut to locate the Autobots who destroyed Megatron, Lockdown is revealed to be just a bounty hunter who doesn't care about the Decepticons' cause and just does it for the 'upgrades' he can get. Ratchet eventually defeats him, reclaims his EMP generator and saves Prime, and opens up about his experiences to his leader. Absents: Starscream, Lugnut, Blackarachnia, Sari Sumdac, Prof. Sumdac, Capt. Fanzone
7	7	"Nanosec"	Matt Youngberg and Shunji Ôga	Marty Isenberg	January 26, 2008
To obtain Destronium to help build his body, Megatron bails a fleet-footed thief named Nino Sexton out of jail. He provides Sexton with Isaac Sumdac's experimental super-speed suit, and Sexton takes the name "Nanosec". Since the Destronium is highly unstable it needs to be transported quickly from the research lab to Megatron directly. Meanwhile, to catch up to the villain, Bumblebee experiments with some new turbo boosters, but they do more harm than good. Eventually, the Autobots exploit Nanosec's weakness (rapidly accelerated aging) and defeat him, and through teamwork, get rid of the exploding Destronium. Absents: Starscream, Lugnut, Blitzwing, Blackarachnia
8	8	"Total Meltdown"	Matt Youngberg and Naoto Hashimoto	Rich Fogel	February 9, 2008
After having his funding cut by Porter C. Powell after Cyrus "The Colossus" Rhodes goes berserk during a demonstration, Prometheus Black experiments with the fluid leaked by Bumblebee which grants him acidic powers. Calling himself "Meltdown", he vows to eliminate Isaac Sumdac, but the Autobots prevent his plans. Note: This is the first episode where no Depecticons appear.
9	9	"Along Came a Spider"	Irineo Maramba, Matt Youngberg, and Yutaka Kagawa	Marty Isenberg	February 16, 2008
It is Halloween and Sari introduces the Autobots to Earth's costume-and-candy traditions. However, the entire affair brings up bad memories for Optimus, who is haunted by the ghosts of his past, specifically when he and his fellow bots, the cocky and arrogant Sentinel Prime and power-mimicking Elita-1 were looking for a crashed Decepticon ship loaded with energon cubes. When Sari takes Bumblebee and Bulkhead trick-or-treating, the spider-like Decepticon Blackarachnia, Elita's mutated form, shows up and targets Sari's key. She wants the key to get rid of her organic half that she got when she was on an organic planet infested with giant spiders with Optimus and Sentinel, who furiously blamed Optimus for Elita's apparent demise. The spider's venom somehow mutated her Cybertronian systems, making her "a freak". After seeing how Sari's key can heal Autobots, she wants to use it to purge her organic half. However, her body can't survive without it now and as a result of using the key, she nearly kills off all organic matter in the entire city (which includes herself and Sari). Optimus gets the key away from her and Blackarachnia, after declining Optimus's offer to help her, escapes, alone once again. Absents: Ratchet, Prowl, Megatron, Starscream, Lugnut, Blitzwing, Prof. Sumdac, Capt. Fanzone
10	10	"Sound and Fury"	Ben Jones and Shunji Ôga	Henry Gilroy	February 23, 2008
Megatron creates Soundwave, a toy robot for Isaac to give to Sari for her birthday. However, Bulkhead is the only one who finds the toy to be a bad thing and discovers the toy is evil. Unbeknownst to Sari, the more she uses her key on Soundwave, the more he will evolve into a bigger robot, which Megatron intends to use as a new body. However, after using the key many times, Soundwave becomes self-aware, upgrades himself into a transformer, and assembles all the robots in Detroit to create an army. When the Autobots catch wind of Soundwave's plan, they try to stop him. Most of the Autobots get overwhelmed, but Bulkhead confronts Soundwave in the sewers. Soundwave tries to convince Bulkhead to his logic. Bulkhead tricks Soundwave and smashes him to pieces, but Soundwave survives as a cassette player. Absents: Starscream, Lugnut, Blitzwing, Blackarachnia, Capt. Fanzone
11	11	"Lost and Found"	Irineo Maramba and Yutaka Kagawa	Rich Fogel	March 1, 2008
Megatron's two deadliest warriors, the three-faced Triple Changer Blitzwing and the strong, obsessively loyal Lugnut arrive on Earth looking for their leader, and tear up Detroit. Optimus Prime and the Autobots battle the highly destructive Decepticons, only to get beaten back by their seemingly endless arsenal of weapons. Megatron, seeing that Lugnut is the most loyal of the two of them, manages to make contact with Lugnut and orders him to obtain Sari's key. With the key they can locate the Allspark, and with that Megatron will be able to return to power. Optimus decides to use Sari's key to repair their ship so that they can leave the planet and lure the Decepticons away from causing more danger to the city. But Sari doesn't want them to go and stubbornly refuses to help them, even to the point of sabotaging their ship. However, the Allspark reveals that if Megatron gets the Allspark, he will destroy everyone and everything in the universe, thus convincing Sari to help. While Optimus and the Autobots battle Blitzwing and Lugnut, Ratchet and Sari reactive their ship's weapons system and blast the pair into scrap. Starscream suddenly appears and promises to save and repair them, but demands them to serve him only. Absents: Blackarchnia, Prof. Sumdac
12	12	"Survival of the Fittest"	Irineo Maramba and Makoto Fuchigami	Steven Granat	March 8, 2008
Sari is abducted by the Dinobots. Prowl and Bulkhead go to Dinobot Island to investigate, followed by Capt. Fanzone. The trio are attacked by the Dinobots, and discover they all have acid burns on their bodies. Worse, it is the work of Prometheus Black (AKA the acid-shooting Meltdown) who has forced the Dinobots to become his watchdogs, and wants to use Sari as part of his experiments to create a transforming human. His previous experiments having failed, Meltdown thinks that a still-growing human, as opposed to an adult, will have better results, and chooses Sari because he hates Sumdac. Bulkhead is heavily injured by Meltdown, and only Sari's key can save his life. Prowl and Fanzone team up to free Sari, but they have to first fight Meltdown's mutant freaks. They take out Meltdown by wrapping him in a non-corrosive containment suit and, after the Dinobots take out Meltdown's mutants, return to the city, leaving the Dinobots on their island. Note: No Decepticons appear in this episode.
13	13	"Headmaster"	Ben Jones and Shunji Ôga	Michael Ryan	March 15, 2008
Sumdac employee Henry Masterson is fired for creating weapons of war. To take revenge on Sumdac, Masterson uses his exo-suit invention to become "The Headmaster". He eventually succeeds in taking over Bulkhead's body, and fights the Autobots using it and weapons built into the Headmaster unit. He also causes the city's generator-core to overload, threatening to destroy the city. By the time the Autobots defeat Headmaster and knock the Headmaster unit off Bulkhead, the overload is at the point where the only way to stop it is to manually push the containment-grid back into position. However, nobody can survive the conditions inside the core, so it's essentially a suicide mission. At first, Optimus plans to do it himself, but Bulkhead has the idea of creating a new robot to do it. The Autobots create a patchwork robot in time, and Sari animates it with her key. The robot succeeds, and its melted, damaged, inanimate remains are put on display. Note: No Decepticons appear in this episode.
14	14	"Nature Calls"	Ben Jones, Bouakeo Thongkham, and Shunji Ôga	Todd Casey	March 22, 2008
Prowl is frustrated by humans plowing snow and the fact that neither Bumblebee nor Sari seem to care. Optimus Prime discovers a non- sentient Cybertronian energy signal and Sari, Prowl, and Bumblebee set off to investigate. Sari attempts to teach Bumblebee the fine rustic art of camping, but he is not the least interested in roughing it. Their semi-peaceful vacation is soon disrupted when they have a run-in with parasitic Space Barnacles, that have apparently taken over the Cybertronian body of their thought-to-have-been destroyed enemy Megatron, and end up taking over Prowl and, later on, Bumblebee. Sari uses hot water to destroy the space barnacles. Her Autobot friends are rescued, but Prof. Sumdac finds Megatron's body and takes it back to his lab to rebuild it. Absents: Ratchet, Bulkhead, Capt. Fanzone Note: No Decepticons or Human Villains appear in this episode, However Megatron's body did at the end of the episode.
15	15	"Megatron Rising: Part 1"	Irineo Maramba, Ciro Nieli, and Kentaro Mizuno	Marsha F. Griffin, Marty Isenberg	March 29, 2008
16	16	"Megatron Rising: Part 2"	Heather A. Maxwell, Ciro Nieli and Shunji Ôga	Marty Isenberg	April 5, 2008
Part 1: When Starscream, Lugnut, and Blitzwing begin their attack upon Earth, Optimus Prime demands that Sari hand over her key to the Autobots. She refuses and Optimus orders Ratchet to use his magnets to forcefully take it from her. Upset, Sari runs away and is captured by Blackarachnia. Optimus begins to doubt his leadership while Megatron begins his next stage to have his body rebuilt. Lugnut and Blitzwing steal the key from the Autobots. Starscream, when scanning Lugnut, learns at last that Megatron is really alive. After thinking a little, he decides to join up with his former leader until the next good opportunity to get rid of Megatron presents itself. Starscream arrives at Sumdac's lab, where Megatron's head is kept, and tries to convince him of his loyalty, not suspecting that Megatron already knows about his treachery. Lugnut and Blitzwing arrives at Sumdac Tower. Sumdac learns of Megatron's trickery of Sumdac having helping him rebuilt his body, deeply ashamed of himself for falling for it. Blitzwing inserts the key into Megatron's head and everyone in the lab witnesses the resurrection of the Decepticon leader. Later, Optimus, Prowl, and Bulkhead watch in horror as Megatron rises to the sky. Part 2: With his new body, Megatron successfully defeats Optimus, Prowl, and Bulkhead, and kills Starscream as punishment for betraying him. After tricking Blackarachnia, Sari joins up with Ratchet and they pick up Prof. Sumdac and the other Autobots at Sumdac Tower, with Megatron, Lugnut, and Blitzwing in hot pursuit. Sari is upset after learning that her father had a hand in rebuilding Megatron. Crashing on Dinobot Island, the factions battle each other, and Optimus disperses the Allspark using Sari's key, seemingly killing Megatron. With the AllSpark out of commission, Sari's key becomes the most powerful Cybertronian artifact in existence. Megatron survives, with Prof. Sumdac as his prisoner. Absent: Capt. Fanzone

=== Season 2 (2008) ===
This season (having thirteen episodes) began just one week after the first season had ended, on April 12, 2008, with the airing of "The Elite Guard", and ended on July 5, 2008, with the two-parter, "A Bridge Too Close". The season revolved mainly around the Autobots in the aftermath of Megatron's return, trying to restore the city and their image. Meanwhile, Megatron, Lugnut, and Blitzwing have captured Prof. Sumdac in order to build a Space Bridge, hoping to use it to conquer a weakened Cybertron from within, while Starscream tries to get his revenge against Megatron. A sub-plot also focuses on Sari as she searches for her father, while learning that there is no record of her existence of any means. Also, Blackarachnia has been reduced to a minor recurring character, only appearing in one episode of the entire season ("Black Friday").

No. overall	No. in season	Title	Directed by	Written by	Original release date
17	1	"The Elite Guard"	Matt Youngberg, Irineo Maramba, and Yutaka Kagawa	Rich Fogel	April 12, 2008
With Isaac Sumdac missing (he was actually captured by Megatron at the last minute), Sari has a hard time running his business. The Cybertron Elite Guard (consisting of Ultra Magnus, Jazz, and Sentinel Prime) have arrived on Earth to locate the Allspark. It is eventually discovered by them that the Allspark wasn't destroyed, but dispersed throughout the city, when a shard of its energy causes an assembly line to go out of control. Meanwhile, Megatron has Sumdac begin to construct a Space Bridge so that his Decepticons can invade Cybertron. Following the aftermath, Sumdac System's new CEO Porter C. Powell reveals to Sari that there are no records of her birth or adoption, meaning that Sari can't prove herself to be the daughter of Isaac Sumdac, or even her own existence. Absent: Starscream
18	2	"The Return of the Headmaster"	Ben Jones and Shunji Ôga	Michael Ryan	April 26, 2008
With Sari evicted from Sumdac Tower, Porter C. Powell rehires Henry Masterson (aka "the Headmaster") to help run Sumdac Systems. Henry then decides to test his Headmaster unit on one of the new Elite Guard bots. Setting his eye on Sentinel Prime, he fakes a Decepticon sighting and takes over Sentinel's body, forcing Optimus and Sentinel to team up to get Sentinel's body back without Ultra Magnus finding out. Meanwhile, Bumblebee and Bulkhead try to be supportive to Sari, who is now forced to live with the Autobots. Absents: Ratchet, Prof. Sumdac, and Jazz Note: No Decepticons appear in this episode (mentioned only).
19	3	"Mission Accomplished"	Irineo Maramba and Yoshio Chatani	Marsha Griffin	May 3, 2008
Unaware of what Megatron is up to, the Elite Guard begin the removal of Optimus Prime and the other Autobots by sending them back to Cybertron to deal with a Decepticon uprising, yet things take a turn for the worse. Blitzwing and Lugnut steal the Tachyon Transmitter from the Elite Guard's ship for Megatron as part of a way to contact other Decepticons. Meanwhile Starscream returns to life on a garbage barge and returns to take his revenge on Megatron. Megatron destroys him again and again... but a fragment of the Allspark in Starscream's head keeps him alive. Then Starscream tries to entrap Megatron with another fragment of the Allspark which he puts on an electrical train. But his attempt fails, thanks to Optimus Prime and his team. The episode ends with Starscream's arrest and imprisonment in the Elite Guard spaceship, and the permission of Ultra Magnus to allow the Autobots to stay on Earth, officially a team. Note: Shockwave is briefly mentioned as "[Megatron's] double agent on Cybertron" at the end. Shockwave wouldn't make his debut until six episodes later.
20	4	"Garbage In, Garbage Out"	Ben Jones and Hidekazu Oka	Marty Isenberg	May 10, 2008
During Detroit's garbage crisis, energy from the Allspark creates a Transformer from a pile of junk. This Transformer, named Wreck-Gar by Angry Archer, causes problems for the city. Crossing paths with Ratchet and Sari (who are working to get Ratchet an attitude adjustment) and Lugnut (looking for Wreck-Gar's Allspark fragment), they all find themselves caught by Porter C. Powell's all-consuming micro-bots, made from Sumdac's nano-tech. Absents: Starscream, Blitzwing, Prof. Sumdac
21	5	"Velocity"	Irineo Maramba, Christopher Berkeley, and Kenji Itoso	Len Uhley	May 17, 2008
After an encounter with a mysterious blue car that outsped him, Bumblebee competes in Master Disaster's underground racing tournament which ends up getting Blitzwing involved when another Allspark fragment is detected. Absents: Starscream, Lugnut, Prof. Sumdac
22	6	"Rise of the Constructicons"	Ben Jones, Irineo Baramba, and Shunji Ôga	Stan Berkowitz	May 24, 2008
After energy from Allspark fragments turns two construction vehicles into Transformers named Scrapper and Mixmaster, Bulkhead befriends them. However, the Decepticons turn the tables on the Autobot's new friends as they want the Constructicons to steal supplies for Megatron's space bridge. Absents: Starscream, Capt. Fanzone
23	7	"A Fistful of Energon"	Irineo Maramba, Matt Youngberg, and Makoto Fuchigami	Andrew R. Robinson	May 31, 2008
Prowl goes off on his own to capture the fugitive Starscream after the latter escapes from the Elite Guard custody. Alighting on the Moon, Prowl discovers the jail-breaker and handcuffs him. But he has also a competition: the famed bounty hunter Lockdown. While two tough "hunters" fight each other, their quarry succeeds in running away again. Deciding the only way to take him down is teaming up, Prowl becomes influenced with Lockdown's upgrades and intentions. Then Prowl and Lockdown set off back to Earth in pursuit of Starscream. But there they get into a true situation. Unexpectedly, they succeed in capturing two Starscreams at once... Who of them is the genuine one? Absent: Bumblebee Note: No humans appear in this episode.
24	8	"SUV: Society of Ultimate Villainy"	Irineo Maramba, Ciro Nieli, and Shunji Ôga	Dean Stefan	June 7, 2008
Under the orders of a mysterious benefactor, Angry Archer, Nanosec, Professor Princess, and a new villainess called Slo-Mo band together to defeat the Autobots. The Autobots soon discover that the S.U.V.'s mysterious benefactor is the Decepticon arms dealer Swindle. He promises to reward the villains handsomely if they gain some technical devices for him. He plans to these devices to create a weapon which can make any machine motionless (including the Autobots) and tries to "flog" it to Megatron. But while he bargains with the Decepticon leader, the villains, being left rewardless, help Sari to revive Bumblebee and the other Autobots. Bumblebee succeeds in "locking" Swindle in his vehicle mode and in handing him and the villains over to justice. Absents: Starscream, Lugnut, Blitzwing, Prof. Sumdac
25	9	"Autoboot Camp"	Ben Jones, Christopher Berkeley, and Shunji Ôga	Michael Ryan	June 14, 2008
After a mysterious convict escapes Autobot custody, Ultra Magnus contacts the earth-bound Autobots so they can identify him in case he shows up on Earth. Bumblebee recognizes the convict as Wasp, a Bot he ran into back when he was in boot camp and whom he put away in jail in the first place as a traitor. He and Bulkhead then go on, as Bulkhead puts it, "a wild grease chase" to find Megatron's base and nail Wasp at the same time after intercepting a message between Megatron and the mysterious "double agent on Cybertron", who is revealed to be the Decepticon Shockwave, posing as an Autobot named Longarm Prime, who helped Bumblebee frame Wasp. Absents: Starscream, Blitzwing, Sari Sumdac, Capt. Fanzone
26	10	"Black Friday"	Irineo Maramba and Kentaro Mizuno	Rich Fogel	June 21, 2008
Blackarachnia has recovered after trying to get the Allspark, and has seduced Grimlock and his team to free Meltdown so he can use his intelligence in the field of genetic modification to purge her organic spider half. Meltdown, however, needs a certain genetic modifier to complete this task, so Blackarachnia blackmails Optimus and Grimlock into getting it by attacking Bumblebee and Prowl and infecting them with her venom. Whether Optimus and Grimlock can work together isn't the only problem, for Meltdown may not be purging the half that Blackarachnia has in mind. Absents: Megatron, Starscream, Lugnut, Blitzwing, Prof. Sumdac
27	11	"Sari, No One's Home"	Irineo Maramba and Yutaka Kagawa	Todd Casey	June 28, 2008
While Prowl and Sari practice agility skills, Bulkhead comes wandering in to inquire about the source of a dripping sound that is annoying him. He soon tracks the sound to Bumblebee, who is leaking oil, and Ratchet ends up having to use his magnets to free from Bulkhead. Optimus, Prowl, and Sari come in and Prime informs them that Scrapper and Mixmaster have surfaced again. The Autobots take off to find them, leaving a very upset Sari, who gets into all sorts of trouble, behind. While searching for the Constructicons, Bumblebee almost destroys some machinery which he mistook for them. Meanwhile the objects of their search follow Bumblebee's oil trail back to the plant and Sari. Blitzwing, who had been sent to find the Constructicons, finds the Autobots and engages them. In the end, Blitzwing is called off by Megatron and the Autobots return to the plant to find that Sari had chased Scrapper and Mixmaster away with the plant's machinery. Absents: Starscream, Lugnut, Capt. Fanzone
28	12	"A Bridge Too Close: Part I"	Christopher Berkeley, Heather A. Maxwell and Shunji Ôga	Marsha F. Griffin & Marty Isenberg	July 5, 2008
29	13	"A Bridge Too Close: Part II"	Christopher Berkeley, Irineo Maramba and Noboro Furuse	Marty Isenberg	July 5, 2008
Part 1: Megatron captures Bulkhead in his plan to take over Cybertron after Shockwave mentions that he's (unexpectedly) the best space bridge engineer on record. With the threat of using the confiscated Headmaster unit on him and Constructicon assistance, Bulkhead is forced to help. The Autobots plan a rescue party and discover that the Blue Racecar from "Velocity" is actually an Autobot Intelligence agent known as Blurr. Part 2: The Autobots face off against Megatron and the Decepticons to save two worlds from total annihilation: Earth and Cybertron. However, Starscream and his clones attack Megatron's hideout. In the climax of the battle, the Autobot Ship takes on a robot form called Omega Supreme, after which a shocked and scared Sari is revealed to have robotic/cybernetic components underneath her pale brown skin. Blurr and a couple of Starscream's clones are lost in space, with Megatron, Starscream, and an inactive Omega Supreme in the same situation. Absent: Capt. Fanzone

=== Season 3 (2009) ===
The third season began on March 14, 2009 with the three-part premiere, "Transwarped", and ended on May 23, 2009 with two-part "Endgame". This season following the events of "Transwarped" focused on the Autobots' attempt to reach Cybertron in order to warn the Autobot High Council of Shockwave, who has been masquerading as Autobot Intelligence Officer Longarm Prime. Meanwhile, Megatron, Starscream, Shockwave (who replaces Blitzwing as a main character), and Lugnut plan to use the colossal Autobot Omega Supreme for constructing clones of him (dubbed as Lugnut Supremes, as they appear similar to Lugnut).

Despite no longer being a main character, Blitzwing returns in three episodes ("Five Servos of Doom", "Human Error, Part 1" and "Decepticon Air"), and Blackarachnia returned for one episode ("Predacons Rising"). The show so-called "concluded" with "Endgame, Part 2" but left many things unresolved and unexplained; mainly Sari's unique origins and ever developing and increasingly powerful Cybertonian abilities as a techno-organic Autobot, and most characters' fates left a mystery.

No. overall	No. in season	Title	Directed by	Written by	Original release date
30	1	"Transwarped: Part One"	Matt Youngberg, Yoshio Chatani, Kalvin Lee	Marty Isenberg, Michael Ryan, and Marsha F. Griffin	March 14, 2009
31	2	"Transwarped: Part Two"	Kalvin Lee, Matt Youngberg	Marty Isenberg, Michael Ryan, and Marsha F. Griffin	March 14, 2009
32	3	"Transwarped: Part Three"	Kalvin Lee, Matt Youngberg	Marty Isenberg, Michael Ryan, and Marsha F. Griffin	March 14, 2009
Around the galaxy, Decepticons are battling the thin-spread Autobots' Space Bridges to join in Megatron's planned invasion from the previous season. Meanwhile, as Sari and Professor Sumdac deal with the fallout of her shocking discovery, the Autobots try to contact Cybertron to warn them of the traitor Longarm in their midst. Meanwhile, Megatron and Starscream inadvertently stumbles upon Omega Supreme's offline body, who they soon decide to use to conquer Cybertron, where an increasingly desperate Longarm/Shockwave tries to cover his tracks. Blurr escapes his confinement with the Starscream clones Thundercracker and Skywarp, and races back to Cybertron, only to be crushed into a cube by Shockwave. While trying to recover spare parts from Megatron's Space Bridge with Bulkhead, Bumblebee is TransWarped to a far-flung region of space, and is consumed a by a rock-like alien, who transwarps back to Earth as well. When the Autobots go to save Bumblebee, Sari uses her Key to upgrade herself to help the Autobots, but soon she loses control of her body. She goes on a rampage and as Bumblebee tries to stop her, Sari accidentally stabs him in his chest-plate. Finally, Ratchet uses his EMP generator to knock her out. Bumblebee is rescued and Sari is left with a teenage body (16 years old), instead of a child body. Megatron arrives on Earth, but he and Starscream are soon sent on an endless Transwarp cycle inside Omega Supreme across the galaxy by the Autobots. Absent: Lugnut
33	4	"Three's a Crowd"	Kalvin Lee and Tetsuro Moronuki	Rich Fogel	March 21, 2009
Bulkhead and Isaac Sumdac try to rebuild the Space Bridge that Megatron had built. When Bulkhead convinces the Constructicons to help out, a combination of a forklift, a Headmaster unit and an Allspark fragment gives birth to Dirt Boss. Meanwhile, the others track down any remaining Decepticons and run into Lugnut. Dirt Boss, having the ability to control other bots due to a mind-control drill, uses it to make Bulkhead go on a rampage. Optimus and the others come to help, leaving Lugnut alone. The result is the Constructicons being transwarped to Dinobot Island, and Lugnut being freed and befriended by Ramjet – the Liar Starscream clone. Absents: Sari Sumdac, Megatron, Starscream, Shockwave
34	5	"Where Is Thy Sting?"	Kalvin Lee and Shigeru Takahashi	Todd Casey	March 28, 2009
A crazed Wasp finds his way to Earth to exact his revenge on Bumblebee, but the Elite Guard follows him. When Wasp swaps places with Bumblebee, Bumblebee must try to convince the Autobots and the Elite Guard who he is. At the same time, Optimus Prime tries to convince Sentinel that Longarm Prime is actually the Decepticon Shockwave. In the end, Wasp escapes and Shockwave savagely attacks Ultra Magnus after his identity is revealed. Absents: Sari Sumdac, Megatron, Starscream, Lugnut Note: No humans appear in this episode.
35	6	"Five Servos of Doom"	Kalvin Lee and Yoshio Frank Chatani	Andrew R. Robinson	April 4, 2009
Sentinel Prime has incredible success capturing fugitive Decepticons Sunstorm, Blitzwing, Swindle (who is still frozen in vehicle form), Lugnut, and Ramjet. This leads Prowl to suspect he's getting help. As he flashes back to his training under Yoketron, Prowl discovers that Lockdown is helping Sentinel for a price. Prowl ultimately defeats Lockdown, avenging Yoketron's death and regaining Yoketron's helmet as well as his upgrade armor in the process, but the bounty hunter escapes. Absents: Bumblebee, Ratchet, Bulkhead, Sari Sumdac, Megatron, Starscream, Shockwave Notes: No humans appear in this episode. Also, Prowl is seen in all following episodes wearing his armor and Yoketron's helmet.
36	7	"Predacons Rising"	Kalvin Lee and Yutaka Kagawa	Larry DiTillio and Bob Forward	April 11, 2009
The Autobots and the Elite Guard pursue Wasp, each with their own agenda. However, Blackarachnia has Swoop capture Wasp in her latest attempt to get rid of her organic half. Jetfire and Jetstorm attack the Dinobots so Sentinel can get in, learning of Elita's fate while Wasp emerges as Waspinator. Optimus and Bumblebee arrive as Waspinator realises Blackarachnia used him and attacks her, the transwarp energy inside him going critical. Though the Primes refuse to let her go again, Blackarachnia sacrifices herself by covering herself and Waspinator in a web cocoon so the blast can affect only them while the ensuing explosion takes out a chunk of Dinobot Island. As Sentinel and Optimus finally move on as Sentinel's group returns to Cybertron to deal with the chaos there, Blackarachnia and Waspinator end up in the jungle. Waspinator tries to pull himself back together, while Blackarachnia finds herself surrounded by a group of animals paying homage to the beast forms of the core group of Maximals from Beast Wars. Absents: Sari Sumdac, Megatron, Starscream, Lugnut, Shockwave Note: No humans appear in this episode.
37	8	"Human Error: Part I"	Kalvin Lee, Christopher Berkeley, Naoto Hashimoto	Henry Gilroy, Marty Isenberg	April 18, 2009
38	9	"Human Error: Part II"	Kalvin Lee	Tom Pugsley, Marty Isenberg	April 25, 2009
Part 1: Porter C. Powell is selling Soundwave action figures on Christmas, and this has Optimus feeling a little uneasy. All seems well though until the Autobots wake up the next morning and discover that they have been turned into humans, and with the Autobots out of the way the Decepticons move in with a full-scale invasion. All hope seems lost but when the Autobots are able to fight back with unrealistic power, the group discovers they are trapped inside a virtual reality by Soundwave, and now are faced with the challenge of escaping it. Part 2: With Soundwave having trapped the Autobots in a virtual reality, Sari must free them before Soundwave completely turns them into Decepticons. She ends up gaining unlikely allies in Snarl, Scrapper, and Wreck-Gar, whom she dubs the "Substitute Autobots". The group defeats the Autobots, freeing them from Soundwave's control, and Optimus destroys Soundwave's body; with Laserbeak soon afterwards flying off with Soundwave's core. Absents: Capt. Fanzone (Part 1); Megatron, Starscream, Lugnut, Shockwave (Part 2)
39	10	"Decepticon Air"	Kalvin Lee and Shigeru Takahashi	Michael Ryan	May 2, 2009
The Space Bridge on Earth is finished, whilst the Elite Guard ship holding most of the Decepticon prisoners heads straight into an ominous space storm. The space storm reactivates Swindle, who frees the Decepticon prisoners, allowing them to take over the ship. Optimus Prime receives a distress call from Sentinel Prime and uses the Space Bridge to transwarp to the ship, where he helps fight back against the Decepticons. Swindle and Lugnut escape the ship, while Blitzwing and the Starscream Clones are taken to Cybertron as prisoners; however, Lugnut finds Megatron and Starscream, and joins them inside Omega Supreme. Absents: Bumblebee, Ratchet, Prowl, Shockwave, Capt. Fanzone
40	11	"This Is Why I Hate Machines"	Kalvin Lee and Yutaka Hirata	Rob Hoegee	May 9, 2009
Ratchet activates Bulkhead's Space Bridge, which ends up sucking Captain Fanzone into it with Ratchet following him. They both end up on Cybertron around the time Sentinel Prime has declared a lockdown. Omega Supreme has arrived on Cybertron with Megatron, Starscream's head, and Lugnut. Thus, Shockwave (still possessing Ultra Magnus' mighty sledgehammer) attempts to get Omega Supreme's access codes from Arcee herself instead of Ratchet to reprogram Omega Supreme. In the end, Ratchet steals Ultra Magnus' hammer back, Jazz joins Optimus Prime's team, and Arcee is shown to have at least some of her memory back.
41	12	"Endgame: Part I"	Kalvin Lee	Rich Fogel, Marty Isenberg	May 16, 2009
42	13	"Endgame: Part II"	Kalvin Lee, Yoshio Chatani	Marsha F. Griffin, Marty Isenberg	May 23, 2009
Part 1: The Autobots discover Omega Supreme's energy signal on the Moon. Rachet insists on going there right away to save him, but Prime refuses, knowing that they are too weak to fight Megatron. Ratchet, Sari and Professor Sumdac build flight boosters for Optimus to even the chances. Prowl tries to put the AllSpark back together, using processor over matter. Meanwhile, Shockwave finally gets Arcee's codes and uses it on protoforms (stolen by Starscream, to make his clones) to duplicate Omega Supreme. Finally, Omega Supreme's clones fly from the moon to invade the Earth. The episode also shows some of Optimus Prime's memory flashes about being expelled from the Elite Guard and meeting his teammates. Part 2: The three Lugnut Supremes touch down on Earth and launch a full-scale assault on Detroit. While Optimus Prime and Prowl fight the Lugnut Supremes and take one down, Ratchet, Bulkhead, Bumblebee, and Sari head to the moon to rescue Arcee and reactivate Omega Supreme. Starscream then takes over the remaining two Supreme clones and initiates their self-destruction. Prowl begins to gather the AllSpark fragments to block the explosion, including the one in Starscream's forehead, which takes him offline for good. Failing to gather enough fragments, Prowl ultimately sacrifices his own Spark and makes an AllSpark force-field that surrounds the last self-destructing Starscream Supreme. Megatron attacks one last time, but is defeated and arrested by Optimus. The Autobots have won, captured Megatron, Shockwave, and Lugnut, and returned to Cybertron with Prowl's lifeless body and several rescued protoforms that Master Yoketron had tragically died protecting.

=== Cancelled fourth season ===
Episodes 43-58 The unmade fourth season would have been centered on pure Energon, since the partial reassembled AllSpark had left Energon deposits all over Detroit and the surrounding area following the events of "Endgame". On August 17, 2019, the United Kingdom-based Transformers event TFNation 2019 read an outline of the season's movie-length premiere "Trial of Megatron". It was presented by Marty Isenberg, with most of the show's original cast reprising their original roles in that fashion.

The voice cast for the outline reading consisted of David Kaye as Optimus Prime, Lugnut, and Cliffjumper; Bumper Robinson as Bumblebee and Blitzwing; Corey Burton as Megatron, Ratchet, Ironhide (who joins Optimus' team, replacing Bulkhead as a main character) and Shockwave; Phil LaMarr as Jazz (replacing the deceased Prowl as a main character), Omega Supreme, Jetstorm, and Alpha Trion; Aimee "Ladywreck" Morgan (substituting Tara Strong) as Sari; Bill Fagerbakke as Bulkhead; Jeff Bennet as Prowl (who appears as an AllSpark spirit) and Ultra Magnus (who goes offline after being attacked by Shockwave in "Where Is Thy Sting?", unable to revived even by Sari's mysterious and mighty power); Townsend Coleman as Sentinel Prime; Chris Finney as Uplink (an Autobot reporter created for the outline) and Rodimus Prime (substituting Judd Nelson); Susan Blu as Arcee; Tom Kenny as Jetfire, Rattletrap, Professor Sumdac, Sunstorm, Ramjet, Scrapper, and Beachcomber; Peter Spellos as Trac-Tor (an Autobot farmer also created for the outline); David Wallace (substituting Robinson) as Blackout; and Leanne Gilks as a Trypticon Prison guard. Other characters featured in the outline included Perceptor, Wheeljack, Red Alert, Dai Altas, Strika, Oil Slick, Cyclonus, Spittor, and Obsidian (a new incarnation of the Beast Machines Vehicon of the same name).

Various other details would have included Sari uncovering her origin and continuing her education on Cybertron while helping Bulkhead protect the Energon farms from Decepticons, Ironhide receiving an Earth vehicle mode, and Bludgeon appearing as a pirate.

Title
"Trial of Megatron"

Part 1: In the aftermath of the Decepticons' defeat, an unprepared Optimus is pushed into conflict with Sentinel for the position of Magnus. Sentinel will do anything to keep his power, and is not afraid to play dirty. Wanting to learn more about her origins, Sari begins her Cybertronian education under Arcee and Autoboot training with Kup.

Part 2: Sentinel separates Team Optimus by having Bumblebee endorse him as Magnus while having the Powermaster armor created. Bulkhead's hometown is targeted by a Decepticon strike force under the command of General Strika as they raid Energon farms. When Sentinel meets with Megatron, offering him better treatment for intel on the raiding 'Cons, Megatron uses both Sentinel's incompetent authoritarianism and his own public trial to his advantage.

Part 3: Sentinel's plan has backfired drastically, as Megatron's trial is revealed to have been a distraction for a spectacular prison break. Blasting the Decepticon capital city of Kaon free from Cybertron's surface, Megatron manages to cripple the Elite Guard using a captured Sentinel as an explosive projectile. Optimus and his crew (Bumblebee, Sari, Ratchet, Jazz, and Ironhide) must stop Megatron from making his ultimate play as he sets the mobile Kaon on a collision course with Earth.
"Turf War"
The Autobots find themselves in the midst of a "turf war" between the Constructicons and other Decepticons when Dirt Boss discovers a new way of becoming the "big bot" of Detroit by gaining control of Energon deposits in the city. To this end, Dirt Boss unleashes his latest "project": Devastator.
"This is Why I Hate Organics"
Rattletrap finds himself on Earth, surrounding by the one thing he fears: organics. He manages to scan an Earth vehicle mode, but he quickly finds himself a target for both Autobots and Decepticons alike.
"Mirror, Mirror"
Attempting to transwarp back to Earth to rejoin their friends, Bulkhead and Sari enter a mirror universe with evil Autobots and heroic Decepticons.
"Gremlins in the Geers"
The Minicons who run Kaon are on the loose and causing much havoc in Detroit by disassembling all machinery they come across- including the Autobots. To save their friends, Ratchet and Fanzone must team up to stop the renegade Minicons.
"What a Tangled Web We Have"
The circumstances of Blackarachnia falling in with the Decepticons, as well as her connections with both Blitzwing and her new army of techno-organic "Predacons", are revealed.
"S.T.E.A.M."
The Autobots are forced to save their detractors when steampunk tool-using, anti-technological vigilantes called "Save The Earth And Mankind" fight back against what they think spells the end of humanity and run afoul of the returning Soundwave.
"It Came from (Planet) Cybertron"
An Autobot named Cosmos has an important message for Optimus, and comes to Earth to tell him. After scanning a prop flying saucer from the set of a B-movie, hi-jinks ensue as Cosmos loses his memory and comes to believe he is a legitimate alien invader.
"Triple Threat"
In his new Triple Changer form, Megatron proceeds to ruthlessly obtain Energon. However, this body has the tragic side effect of Megatron developing the unstable personality of a one-bot army blowing away anything and anyone in his path.
"Allspark-alypse Now!"
Sentinel comes to Earth and intends to use the AllSpark to kill Megatron. Using AllSpark fragments and Cybertronians empowered by them as a way of communicating from the Well of AllSparks, the spiritual essence of Prowl tells Optimus about the consequences of Sentinel's ideas.
"Process of Elimination"
Bumblebee investigates a series of deadly attacks on his old boot camp platoon who are being picked off by a mysterious assailant. All signs point to either Waspinator or Shockwave until they are also attacked, thus deepening the mystery.
"Trukk vs. Munky"
Optimus and his friends face off against one of Blackarachnia's loyal Predacon subjects: a failed cloning experiment named Primal Major.
"Megatron Must Be Destroyed!"

Part 1: As Megatron's machinations of reformatting Earth into a new Decepticon-themed home world reaches fruition and threaten the entire planet, unholy alliances arise between the Autobots, Decepticons under the command of the Starscream clone Slipstream, Blackarachnia's Predacons, and the Dinobots to defeat Megatron once and for all with many casualties abound.

Part 2: As a Powermaster-enhanced Optimus Prime battles Megatron, Sari discovers a personal connection between her and an entity of a higher power revered by all Cybertonians that may save both Earth and Cybertron.
