= Frederick Crowder =

Frederick Crowder may refer to:

- Frederick Thomas Crowder (1916–1942), Australian private who was killed in the Ration Truck massacre
- Petre Crowder (Frederick Petre Crowder, 1919–1999), British politician
- Frederick Crowder (cricketer) (1798–1894), English cricketer
- Frederick Crowder (sportsman) (1845–1938), English cricketer and Wimbledon tennis player
- Frederick Crowder (politician) (1850–1902), Western Australian politician
