= Alfred Crowder =

English cricketer

Personal information
- Full name: Alfred Joseph Crowder
- Born: 3 April 1878; Clipston, Northamptonshire, England
- Died: 12 October 1961 (aged 83); Isleworth, Middlesex, England

Domestic team information
- Years: Team
- 1908: Somerset

Career statistics
Competition	FC
Matches	3
Runs scored	44
Batting average	7.33
100s/50s	0/0
Top score	24
Catches/stumpings	1/–
- Source: CricketArchive, 22 December 2015

Alfred Joseph Crowder (3 April 1878 – 12 October 1961) played first-class cricket for Somerset in three matches in the 1908 season. He was born in Clipston, Northamptonshire and died at Isleworth, Middlesex.

Crowder opened the innings in his first match against Lancashire at Recreation Ground, Bath. But he had limited success in first-class cricket and his highest score in six innings was 24, which he made against Sussex at County Ground, Taunton while the follow-on was being enforced. In all six innings, he made just 44 runs at an average of 8.80 runs per innings.
