= Crowded (comic book) =

- Cover of Crowded #9

Publication information
- Publisher: Image Comics
- Publication date: August 2018 — March 2020
- No. of issues: 12

Creative team
- Written by: Christopher Sebela
- Artist(s): Triona Farrell; Ro Stein; Ted Brandt

Crowded is a comic book series that were published by Image Comics from August 2018 to March 2020 with a stand-alone final volume in February 2022.

== Synopsis ==
Charlie Ellison becomes the target of Reapr's million dollar campaign and hires bodyguard Vita.

== Prints ==
=== Issues ===
#	Publication date	Comic Book Roundup rating	Estimated sales (first month)
1	August 15, 2018	8.3 by 23 professional critics.	13,281, ranked 158th in North America
2	September 12, 2018	8.6 by 4 professional critics.	6,474, ranked 230th in North America
3	October 10, 2018	8.9 by 5 professional critics.	5,683, ranked 280th in North America
4	November 7, 2018	8.8 by 5 professional critics.	4,466, ranked 249th in North America
5	December 5, 2018	9.3 by 3 professional critics.	4,054, ranked 260th in North America
6	January 2, 2019	8.7 by 8 professional critics.	3,743, ranked 327th in North America
7	July 3, 2019	8.8 by 5 professional critics.	3,055, ranked 342nd in North America
8	August 7, 2019	8.3 by 5 professional critics.	2,986, ranked 312th in North America
9	September 4, 2019	9.4 by 5 professional critics.	2,798, ranked 340th in North America
10	November 20, 2019	8.8 by 4 professional critics.	2,552, ranked 329th in North America
11	February 5, 2020	8.2 by 5 professional critics.	2,511, ranked 319th in North America
12	March 25, 2020	9.2 by 6 professional critics.	2,402, ranked 337th in North America

=== Collected volumes ===
Title	Publication date	Collected material	ISBN	Estimated sales (first month)
Crowded, Vol 1	March 20, 2019	Crowded #1-6	9781534310544	1,177, ranked 77th in North America
Crowded, Vol 2	June 24, 2020	Crowded #7-12	9781534313750	—N/a
Crowded, Vol 3	February 16, 2022	Crowded #13-17	9781534321083	—N/a

== Reception ==
Joshua Davison from Bleeding Cool, reviewing the first issue, praised the writer and artists. Nicole Drum from ComicBook.com wrote that "Crowded #1 sets up a deeply thought-provoking story in a way that is entertaining and engaging".
