= Breathe (Kaz James song) =

Single by Kaz James featuring Stu Stone

from the album If They Knew
- Released: 26 April 2008
- Genre: Pop, dance
- Length: 3:23
- Label: Sony BMG
- Songwriters: Dennis Dowlut, Stuart Eisenstein, Kaz James

Kaz James featuring Stu Stone singles chronology
"Breathe" (2008)	"We Hold On" (2008)

"Breathe" is a 2008 pop-dance song by Kaz James featuring Stu Stone. It is the first solo release by James, who is a former member of the group BodyRockers. The song was later included on James' debut album If They Knew, which was released in Australia and New Zealand in October 2008. The song peaked at No. 57 on the ARIA Singles Chart.

== Music video ==
The music video for "Breathe" was directed by Australian filmmaker Fred Schepisi and cinematographer Ian Baker. The video was filmed in Melbourne, Australia.

== Track listings ==
Australian CD single

1. "Breathe (Radio edit)" – 3:23
2. "Breathe (Original 12 Mix)" – 6:06
3. "Breathe (Thomas Gold Remix)" – 8:00
4. "Breathe (Nick Galea Remix)" – 7:55
5. "Breathe (Jason Herd Remix)" – 7:27

iTunes EP

6. "Breathe (Heat Remix)" – 5:14

== Charts ==
Year	Chart	Peak position
2008	ARIA Singles Chart	57
2008	ARIA Physical Singles Chart	39
2008	ARIA Australian Singles	13
2008	ARIA Dance Singles	8
2008	ARIA Club Chart	1

== Release history ==
Country	Release date	Format	Label	Catalogue
Australia	26 April 2008	CD single, digital download	Sony BMG	88697304132
