= Malibu's Most Wanted (soundtrack) =

Soundtrack album by Various artists
- Released: April 15, 2003
- Recorded: 2002–2003
- Genre: Hip hop
- Length: 54:00
- Label: Universal
- Producer: Baby Jaymes; Fredwreck; Hi-C; Ugly Fingers

Singles from Malibu's Most Wanted
- 1. "Crush On You" Released: 2003

Professional ratings
Review scores
Source	Rating
AllMusic	3/5 stars

Music from the Motion Picture Malibu's Most Wanted is the official soundtrack to John Whitesell's 2003 comedy film Malibu's Most Wanted. It was released April 15, 2003 by Universal Records.

== Track listing ==
1. "Girls, Girls"- 4:25 (Snoop Dogg and Jamie Kennedy)
2. "I Told Ya"- 2:56 (Grandaddy Souf)
3. "Most Wanted in Malibu"- 2:47 (Baby Jaymes and Jamie Kennedy)
4. "Chug-A-Lug"- 4:36 (Pastor Troy)
5. "Really Don't Wanna Go"- 3:56 (David Banner and B-Flat)
6. "Crush on You"- 3:55 (Mario Winans and Mr. Cheeks)
7. "Blah Blah Blah Blah"- 2:58 (702)
8. "In Here Ta Nite"- 3:59 (Rated R)
9. "That's Dirty"- 4:13 (Dirty and Mannie Fresh)
10. "Play That Funky Music (White Boy)"- 4:23 (Hi-C, Kokane, Young Dre the Truth and Drop)
11. "I Want You Girl"- 4:20 (Butch Cassidy)
12. "California"- 3:30 (Akia and Kareem Osbourne)
13. "Choppa Style"- 4:30 (Choppa and Master P)
14. "Get Back"- 3:32 (Silkk the Shocker, Curren$y and 504 Boyz)

== Other songs ==
The following songs are featured in the film, but not included in the soundtrack:

1. "Grindin'" - The Clipse
2. "It's Tricky" - Run-D.M.C.
3. "Parents Just Don't Understand" - DJ Jazzy Jeff & The Fresh Prince
4. "O.P.P." - Naughty by Nature
5. "Me So Horny" - The 2 Live Crew
6. "From tha Chuuuch to da Palace" - Snoop Dogg
