= Stuart Stone =

Canadian actor and rapper

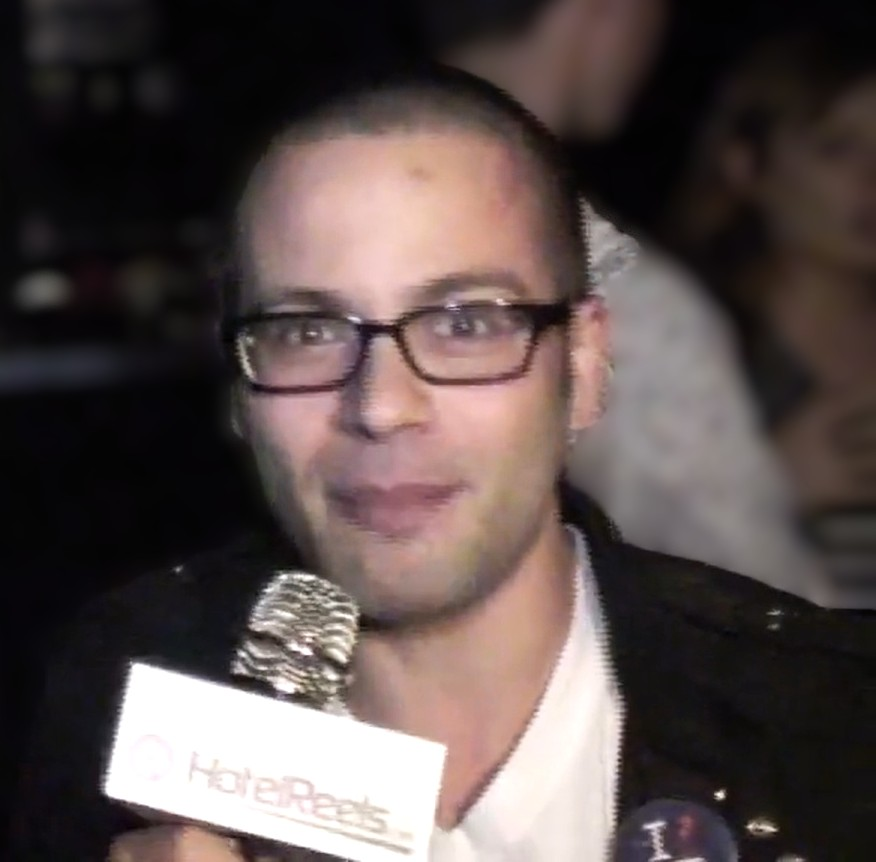
- Stone in 2010
- Born: Stuart Eisenstein; Thornhill, Ontario, Canada
- Other name: Stu Stone
- Education: Thornlea Secondary School
- Occupations: Actor, director, comedian, rapper, record producer, wrestler
- Years active: 1984-present

Stuart "Stu" Stone (born Stuart Eisenstein) is a Canadian actor as well as a producer of television, film and music. He is best known for his roles as Ronald Fisher in Donnie Darko, Ralphie Tennelli in The Magic School Bus animated television series from 1994 to 1997, and Carl Crashman and C2 in Carl² from 2005 to 2011. Stone has also toured as a comedian and rapper.

== Early life ==
Stone was born Stuart Eisenstein in Thornhill, Ontario. He attended Thornlea Secondary School. His parents ran a franchise selling hockey and baseball cards. After graduating high school, he moved to Los Angeles, California to continue his career in acting.

== Career ==
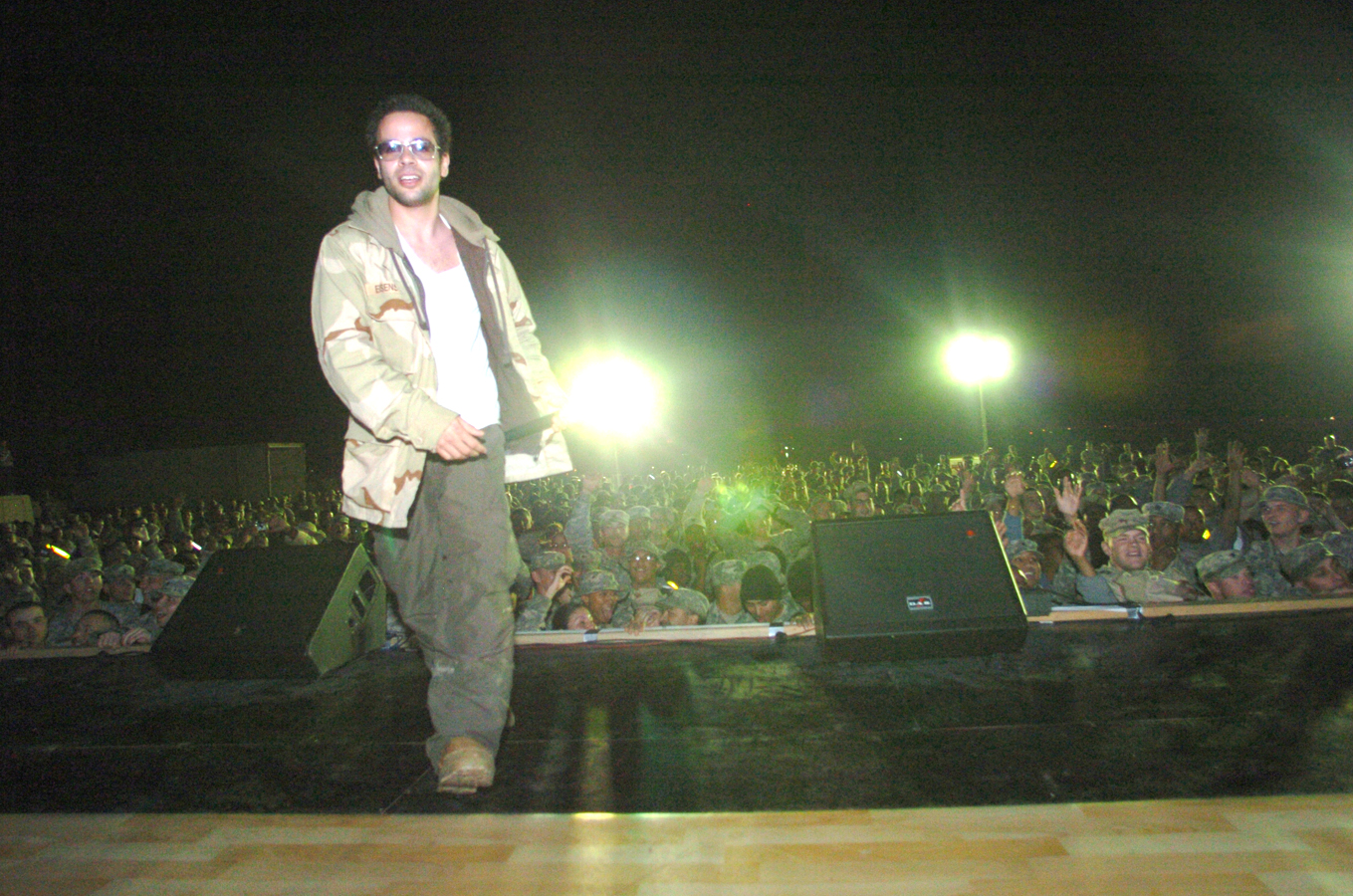
Stone on stage in Baghdad in 2007

Stone started his acting career at age two, appearing in Canadian TV commercials such as Maple Leaf Foods Ham and Kraft Dinner as a child actor in Toronto. He made his major motion picture debut in Heavenly Bodies as Joey, Samantha Blair's son played by Cynthia Dale, in 1985. Since then, he has guest-starred in many such as Goosebumps, Boston Public, and Flash Forward. He starred in animated features such as Babar: The Movie and The Magic School Bus as a voice-over actor. He has also done voice-over work for Care Bears and voices both main characters in the Canadian cartoon Carl². He also had roles in the films Donnie Darko and The Boys Club.

In 2006, Stone and his friend Jamie Kennedy starred together in the MTV reality show Blowin' Up, which showed the journey the two went through to create a hit rap album and "blowin' up". After the show aired its finale, the album Stone and Kennedy created was released, which was titled Blowin' Up to correspond with their reality series, and both also appeared on the MTV show True Love. The album featured guest appearances from Houston rapper Paul Wall and Bay Area rapper E-40, as well as actors Bob Saget and Jason Biggs.

Stone has been known to tour off and on with Kennedy on his stand-up tours, performing songs from the Blowin' Up album, as well as the song "The Left One", featured on Kennedy's Unwashed album. Shows on this variety are routinely opened by comedian Bill Dawes, and at times have had guests, such as Saget at a November 17, 2006, Las Vegas show.

Stone hosted his own show, "The Sunday Nite Stu", which was originally broadcast online through Stickam webcasts. His show aired Sundays at 9 PM PST drawing in over 300 thousand viewers monthly. He brought along a variety of guest stars and anyone with a Stickam account could join his live room and watch or even get a chance to chat with him. The show was the first ever on the Stickam site and in 2012, "Sunday Nite Stu" celebrated over 10 million viewers. Guests included Colt Cabana, The Last Goodnight, Paul Wall, Young Church, Elliott Yamin, Kaz James, Jared McMullin, Andy Milonakis, and Chester French.

Stone's TSM RADIO podcast continues to be one of the most listened to on the net. Stone's interviews often give a chance for fans to hear their favourite artists and actors speak in a more "candid" fashion. Guests have included Tila Tequila, Perez Hilton, Jason Wahler, Talan Torriero, Elliott Yamin, Bonnie McKee, Everlast, Lucy Walsh, Dennis Haskins, Rohan Marley, Edward Furlong, Flower Tucci, Chyna, Kendra Jade, Christy Hemme, Diamond Dallas Page, Bobby Lee, Cisco Adler, and many others.

Stone worked as the producer of magician Criss Angel's television series. He also produced "Criss Angel: Loyal Saturday" and "Criss Angel: Live Wire" broadcasts.

Stone performs regularly on the weekly pro-wrestling series "Championship Wrestling From Hollywood". Stone handles commentary on the broadcast as well as performing alongside his stable of wrestlers: The Family Stone.

Stone along with his business partner and brother-in-law Adam Rodness formed the company 5'7 films. Stone served as director and co-writer on the film The Haunted House On Kirby Road, which won best horror feature at the Toronto Independent Film Festival. Stu Stone also won best director for the film at the CineView film festival. 5'7 films has announced a second feature with Breakthrough entertainment which will once again put Stone in the director's chair. Another horror film revolving around Scarecrows. The company also has said they will be releasing a documentary feature on the world of baseball cards.

Stone and Rodness appear in the music video for the song "Falling Back" by Drake, appearing as members of The Dan Band during a wedding scene.

Stone, along with a group known as Legal Banter, pioneered the sports jersey reveal party. This jersey exchange turned social event honours oft-forgotten 1970s-2000s sports heroes, while enabling safe adherence to COVID-19 distancing restrictions.

== Filmography ==
=== Film ===
| Year | Title | Role | Notes |
|---|---|---|---|
| 2001 | Donnie Darko | Ronald Fisher | |
| 2001 | Joy Ride | Danny | |
| 2002 | Sorority Boys | Valet | |
| 2013 | A Resurrection | Nick | |
| 2016 | Gearheads | Travis | |

=== Television ===
| Year | Title | Role | Notes |
|---|---|---|---|
| 1984 | Heavenly Bodies | Joel Blair | |
| 1984 | The Edison Twins | Pete | Episode: "Enemy of Weston" |
| 1986 | Kay O'Brien | Danny Villaneuva | Episode: "Taking the Heat" |
| 1986 | Lost! | | Television film |
| 1987 | My Pet Monster | Chuckie (voice) | |
| 1987 | Blue Monkey | Joey | |
| 1988 | War of the Worlds | Bobby | Episode: "Thy Kingdom Come" |
| 1988 | Clifford's Fun with Letters | Additional voices | Video short |
| 1988 | ALF Tales | Additional voices | |
| 1989–91 | Babar | Arthur, Alexander (voice) | |
| 1989–93 | Katts and Dog | Buddie | 6 episodes |
| 1989 | The Teddy Bears' Picnic | Wally Bear (voice) | TV special |
| 1990 | The Adventures of Super Mario Bros. 3 | Hip, Junior (voice) | |
| 1990–91 | The Raccoons | Bentley Raccoon, Danny (voice) | 7 episodes |
| 1991 | Wish Kid | Darryl Singletary (voice) | |
| 1991 | Rupert | Additional voices | |
| 1991 | Swamp Thing | Additional voices | 5 episodes |
| 1991 | Super Mario World | Hip (voice) | |
| 1991 | Bill and Ted's Excellent Adventures | Additional voices | DIC version |
| 1991 | Beetlejuice | Ramon | Episode: "Beetledude" |
| 1992 | Used People | Cousin Stevie | |
| 1992 | Maniac Mansion | Frankie Vaughn | Episode: "Ike's Black Eye" |
| 1992 | The Teddy Bears' Christmas | Wally Bear | Television film |
| 1992–1996 | X-Men: The Animated Series | Proteus, Tyler Dayspring, additional voices | Recurring role |
| 1992–1994 | Dog City | Eddie (voice) | 6 episodes |
| 1993 | Tales from the Cryptkeeper | Craig (voice) | Episode: "The Works... In Wax" |
| 1994 | Are You Afraid of the Dark? | Doug Johnston | Episode: "The Tale of the Quicksilver" |
| 1994 | The Tick | Charles / Brainchild (voice) | Episode: "Coach Fussell's Lament" |
| 1994 | Highlander: The Animated Series | Various | |
| 1994 | Wild C.A.T.s | Additional voices | |
| 1994–97 | The Magic School Bus | Ralphie Tennelli (voice) | 52 episodes |
| 1994–96 | The Busy World of Richard Scarry | Kenny Bear, Manuel, Pig Will, Pig Won't (voice) | Uncredited |
| 1995 | Goosebumps | Brian Colson | Episode: "Phantom of the Auditorium" |
| 1995 | Ultraforce | Additional voices | |
| 1996 | Flash Forward | Jack Debbens | 6 episodes |
| 1996 | Ace Ventura: Pet Detective | Additional voices | |
| 1997 | The Boys Club | Brad | |
| 1997 | Beverly Hills, 90210 | Kid | Episode: "Friends in Deed" |
| 1998 | Pacific Blue | Jason Sanchez | Episode: "Double Lives" |
| 1999 | The Pretender | Chris | Episode: "Murder 101" |
| 1999 | Vendetta | Tony Provenzano | Television film |
| 2000 | Damaged Goods | Felix | Television film |
| 2000 | The Independent | Jack Barth | |
| 2001 | Da Möb | JT (voice) | |
| 2001 | Joy Ride | Danny, Lewis' Roommate | |
| 2002 | Boston Public | Jordan Murphy | Episode: "Chapter Thirty-Seven" |
| 2002–2003 | Rugrats | Various voices | 2 episodes |
| 2003 | Saint Seiya | Cygnus Hyoga (voice) | DIC English dub |
| 2004 | Cyberchase | Sheldon, Scritter (voice) | Episode: "Piece of the Action" |
| 2004 | Braceface | Taylor Knight (voice) | Episode: "Knight to Remember" |
| 2004 | Mutant X | Einstein | Episode: "Divided Loyalties" |
| 2004 | Serial Killing 4 Dummys | Amil | |
| 2004 | NCIS | Dillon | Episode: "Split Decision" |
| 2005–2011 | Carl² | Carl Crashman/C2 (voice) | |
| 2006 | Pope Dreams | Fox | |
| 2007 | Kickin' It Old Skool | DJ Tanner | |
| 2008 | Bitten | Twitch | |
| 2011 | Hard Love | Snap | |
| 2014 | Little Savages | Fink | |
| 2014 | Fated (Short) | Agent Cliff | |
| 2015 | Kantemir | Brad | |
| 2015 | Tar | Sebastian | |
| 2015 | Life on the Line | Hunter | |

== Video game roles ==
- Palace Pets App - Sundrop

== Director ==
- 2016: The Haunted House on Kirby Road
- 2017: Scarecrows
- 2018: Jack of all Trades
- 2019: The Thrillusionists
- 2020: Faking a Murderer
- 2022: Vandits

== Awards and nominations ==
=== Canadian Awards for the Electronic and Animated Arts (CAEAA) ===
| Year | Result | Award | Category/Recipient(s) |
|---|---|---|---|
| 2008 | Nominated | ELAN Awards | Best Male Voice Over in an Animated Feature or Television Production, for Episode 32 "Superstar" in Carl Squared |
| 2016 | Winner | Toronto Independent Film Festival | Best Horror Feature for The Haunted House on Kirby Road |
| 2016 | Winner | CineView Film Festival | Best Director for The Haunted House on Kirby Road |
| 2021 | Winner | Cult Critics Awards | Best Cult Feature for Faking A Murderer |

== Discography ==
=== Albums ===
| Album information | Track list and credits for each track |
|---|---|
| Blowin' Up: Released: July 11, 2006; Label: Warner Bros/JKss Records; Type of label: Major; Chart Positions: N/A; U.S. certification: N/A; U.S. Sales: N/A; Worldwide sales: 350,000 | Circle Circle Dot Dot (written and produced by Stu Stone and Jamie Rise); Rollin With Saget (written and produced by Stu Stone and D Sissive); 1984 (written and produced by Stu Stone, Jamie Kennedy and DJ Lethal); Flirt (written and produced by Stu Stone and Richard "Younglord" Frierson); Crooked Stick (written and produced by Stu Stone and Jamie Rise); Knuckle Up (written and produced by Stu Stone and Richard "Younglord" Frierson); Car Rear (written and produced by Stu Stone and Jamie Rise); Fuck Jamie Kennedy (written and produced by Stu Stone, E40 and Jamie Rise); Rush the Club (written and produced by Kardinal Offishal and Stu Stone); Celebrity Stalker (written and produced by Stu Stone, Jamie Kennedy and Eric V); Mattress Mack (written and produced by Stu Stone, Justin Trugman, Sporty O and Paul Wall) |

| Album information | Track list and credits for each track |
|---|---|
| Return of the Stone Movement (album): Released: July 27, 2011; Label: The Stone Movement; Type of label: Independent | Give It Up (written and produced by Stu Stone and Optimus Rock); Super Bird (written and produced by Stu Stone and DJ Lethal); Barely Legal (written and produced by Stu Stone, Justin Trugman and Marty James); Memory Lane (written and produced by Stu Stone and Justin Trugman); Wassupwidit (written and produced by Stu Stone, Young Church, Nic Nac and Oliver Goldstein); Doin Just Fine (written and produced by Stu Stone and Party Slayerz - DJ Lethal and Franko); Ordinary Girl (written and produced by Stu Stone and Jamie Rise); Stu Stone(d) (written and produced by Stu Stone and Justin Trugman); Two Sixteens (written and produced by Stu Stone, DJ Lethal and D-Sisive); Day I Died in California (written and produced by Stu Stone and Jamie Rise); How You Want It (written and produced by Stu Stone, Jay E and Joel Madden); I'd Like To Know (written and produced by Stu Stone, DJ Lethal and Ely "the Creep" Rise); Phake Wit Da Phunk (written and produced by Stu Stone and Christopher Lawrence); The Message feat Perez Hilton (written and produced by Stu Stone); Love Song (written and produced by Stu Stone and Justin Trugman); She Don't Know My Name (written and produced by Stu Stone and Jamie Rise); Breathe (written and produced by Stu Stone and Kaz James); Save The Gingers (written and produced by Stu Stone and Justin Trugman) |

=== Singles ===
- "Save the Gingers (Red Head Woman)" (2010)
- "Super Bird" (2011)
- "Kid On X-Mas" feat Jamie Kennedy (2011)

As featured performer
Kaz James, Sony BMG, 2008
(from James' debut solo album If They Knew)

- "Breathe" – written and produced by Stu Stone and Kaz James
- "Subwoofers in the Neighborhood" – written and produced by Stu Stone and Kaz James

== Videography ==
=== Jamie Kennedy & Stu Stone ===
| Year | Song title | Director |
|---|---|---|
| 2006 | "Rollin' With Saget"(featuring Bob Saget) | Dave Dean |
| 2006 | "Circle Circle Dot Dot" (unreleased version) | Dave Dean |
| 2007 | "Circle Circle Dot Dot" (Lego version) | Nate Blurr (Blunty3000) |
| 2007 | "1984" | Janet Roston & Gerry Stansgar |
| 2011 | "Kid On X-Mas" | Ilya Farfell |

=== Stu Stone ===
| Year | Song title | Director |
|---|---|---|
| 2008 | "Breathe"(featuring Kaz James) | Fred Schepisi |
| 2010 | "Save the Gingers" | Ron Howard |
| 2011 | "Super Bird" | David Finkelstein |
| 2013 | "Ordinary Girl" | Jeremy Foley |

=== R.O.T.N. ===
| Year | Song title | Director |
|---|---|---|
| 2012 | "I Just Wanna" | Ilya Farfel |
| 2013 | "High As Hell" | Ilya Farfel |

== See also ==
- Jamie Kennedy's Blowin' Up
