= The Bridge Shopping Centre =

Coordinates: 50.798587°N 1.078240°W

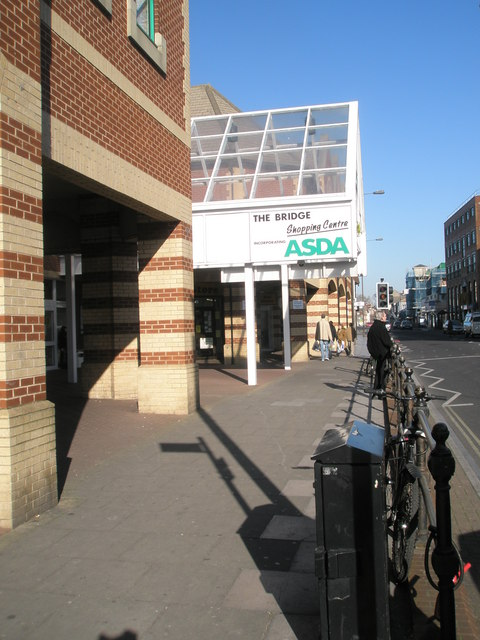
- Entrance to the centre in Fratton Road, circa 2008
- Location: Portsmouth, Hampshire England
- Opened: 11 May 1989
- Owner: Portsmouth City Council
- Num. of stores: 25
- Num. of anchor tenants: 1
- Floors: 1

The Bridge Shopping Centre is a small shopping centre located in Portsmouth, England. The centre was opened in May 1989 on land which was formerly home to Portsea Island Central Premises Co-Op. The centre was originally owned by Asda, who were their main tenant, until the Portsmouth City Council purchased the centre in September 2023, with plans to include new tenants and office space.

== Shops ==
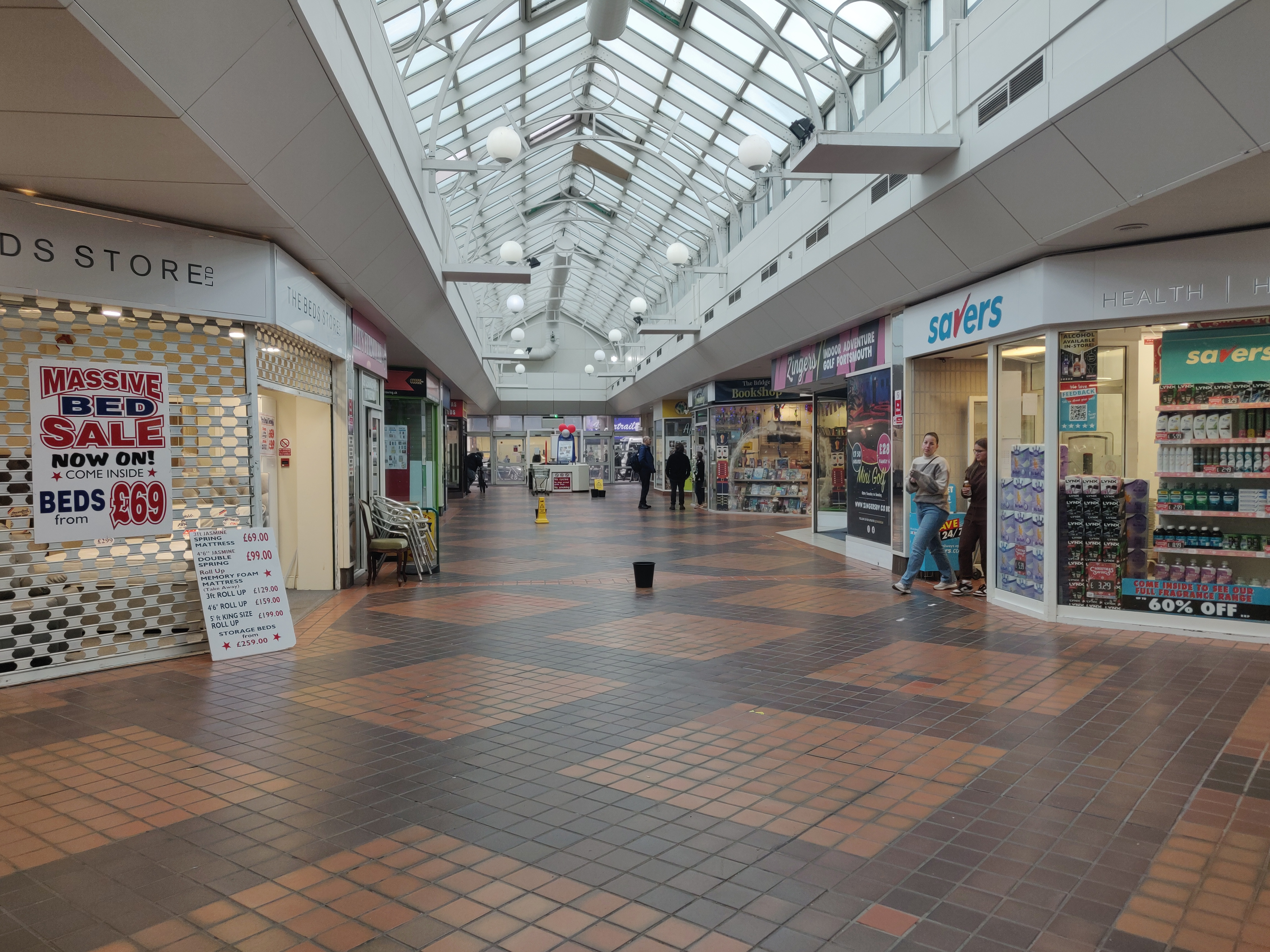
Shops in the Bridge Centre

Over the years, shops have come and gone in the centre. Throughout the decade from 2010 until 2019, a majority of the shops in the centre were empty, and it was not until 2020 when the centre would gain tenants again.

=== Outside ===
- Fratton Together Pantry
- Player Reality Virtual Reality (formerly My VR)
- Italian Furniture Outlet (Access inside the centre)
- RSPCA Charity Store
- Asda Opticians
- Barber
- The Bridge Café
- The Bed Store Ltd.
- Max Spielmann Photo Shop
- Timpson
- Post Office
- Savers
- Tilly's Furniture
- Wink Brow Bar

== Fire ==
In late October 2025, an electrical fire started in the Asda store. Firefighters traveled to the scene and quickly put out the fires, and no one was injured.

== Former shops ==
- AfricExpress (access inside the centre)
- Age UK (formerly Age Concern)
- Barnardo’s
- The Bridge Bookshop
- Clinton Cards
- The Co-Operative Travel (formerly Travelcare)
- Cubano Beach Club
- Ethel Austin
- Goulds Jewellers
- GetBrewing.uk
- Heritage Butchers
- Iceland
- Laser Cuts
- New Look
- Olan Mills
- Outside Centre Sports
- Pam Purred Pets (doors inside of centre)
- Party & Print
- Penfolds Confectionary
- Rebecca's Pantry
- Rita's Hair and Beauty
- The Scene
- Superdrug
- Shoefayre
- Select Fashion
- Wessex Community Bank
