= Blowin' Up =

- Starring: Jamie Kennedy; Stu Stone
- Country of origin: United States

Production
- Running time: 30 minutes

Original release
- Network: MTV
- Release: May 2, 2006 – July 31, 2007

Blowin' Up is a comedy reality show on MTV. The show stars Jamie Kennedy, an actor who follows his dream of becoming a successful rapper. The show was written by Kennedy after the success of the movie Malibu's Most Wanted, in which he starred. Along for the ride is his close friend Stu Stone, who keeps Jamie in check to stick to their rap career.

Throughout the show there are various celebrity appearances. From the beginning, Jamie expresses his dislike for fellow actor Jason Biggs (who, like Kennedy, appeared in Kevin Smith's 2001 film Jay and Silent Bob Strike Back). Jamie and Stu also encounter many different rappers during the season, including Mike Jones, Ice-T, and a performance with the Three 6 Mafia. Jamie and Stu also try to recruit special guests on their album, getting Bob Saget, formerly of the TV show Full House. The song was titled "Rollin' with Saget."

Robin Bechtel, an executive at Warner Bros. Records discovered Jamie Kennedy and Stu Stone's music on MySpace before the MTV show was greenlit. When she met with Kennedy and Stone, they all discussed pitching a show that would tell the story of their rap ventures. After MTV greenlit the show, Bechtel signed the duo and starred in their show. An album featuring the tracks recorded during the filming of Blowin' Up, sharing a title of the same name, was released on July 11, 2006. Some of the songs include "Circle Circle Dot Dot," "Rollin' With Saget," "1984," and "Crooked Stick." In the early popularity of YouTube, a fan created a lego inspired video for Circle Circle Dot Dot that hit the homepage of YouTube and Perezhilton.com which catapulted the video to #1 status on YouTube. Circle Circle Dot Dot then became an internet phenomenon and was a #1 ringtone.

== Blowin' Up album ==
Blowin' Up

Studio album by Jamie Kennedy and Stu Stone
- Released: July 11, 2006
- Recorded: 2005–2006
- Genre: Hip hop
- Label: JKss Records
- Producers: Jamie Kennedy, Robin Bechtel, Kardinal Offishall

Professional ratings
Review scores
Source	Rating
Allmusic	4/5 stars
RapReviews.com	5.5/10 stars

=== Track listing ===
1. Circle Circle Dot Dot
2. A Message from Bob
3. Rollin' with Saget (feat. Bob Saget)
4. 1984
5. Rush the Club (feat. Kardinal Offishall)
6. Crooked Stick
7. Flirt
8. I Don't Want Beef
9. Knuckle Up
10. Car Rear
11. Mattress Mack (feat. Paul Wall)
12. Blane's Story
13. Bologna
14. Fuck Jamie Kennedy (feat. E-40 and Jason Biggs)
15. Celebrity Stalker
16. Strip Club Dummy
17. Message from Iceberg
18. Guns (Gill T. Pleasure, Jamie Kennedy & Stu Stone)

The album was executive produced by Jamie Kennedy and Robin Bechtel and produced by Stu Stone.

=== Credits ===
- Jamie Kennedy – vocals
- Stu Stone – vocals, arranger, producer
- Ely "Creepy" Rise – keyboards
- Richard "Younglord" Frierson – arranger, producer
- Kardinal Offishall – vocals, arranger, producer
- Justin Trugman – producer, engineer
- Ryan West – engineer
- Robin Sloan Bechtel – executive producer
- Brothers Rise – producer
- Yuri Katz – engineer, mixer
- DJ Joey Nicks – producer
- Jamie Rise – producer, engineer, executive producer
- Chris Bellman – mastering
- Scott Levitin – mastering
- Paul Wall – vocals

== Episode list ==
- 1.01 – Dope-Ass Rapper
- 1.02 – Law & Disorderlies
- 1.03 – Grillz
- 1.04 – Up Your #@&%
- 1.05 – Do It Yourself
- 1.06 – The Breakup (A.K.A. Starting Over)
- 1.07 – Guilty Pleasure (episode not included on DVD)
- 1.08 – Deal With It

== See also ==
- Jamie Kennedy
- Malibu's Most Wanted
