= Boys Brigade (band) =

Canadian new wave band

- Origin: Toronto, Ontario, Canada
- Genres: New wave
- Years active: 1980–1984
- Label: Anthem/Capitol-EMI
- Past members: Malcolm Burn; Tony Lester; Wayne Lorenz; Billie Brock; David Porter; Jeff Packer
- Website: www.myspace.com/boysbrigadeband

Boys Brigade was a Canadian new wave band formed in 1980 in Toronto, Ontario, Canada. The band consisted of vocalist and keyboardist Malcolm Burn, guitarist and vocalist Tony Lester, bass guitarist Wayne Lorenz, drummer Billie Brock and percussionists David Porter and Jeff Packer. One critic noted, "What made Boys Brigade stand out was their strong use of percussionists in a standard rock/new wave format."

== History ==
Boys Brigade began when Malcolm Burn met Tony Lester. Lester had been with the British band Bandit; when it broke up, Lester moved to Toronto to join the band Arson which, by the time he arrived, had broken up. The two gathered the other members and contracted the manager Raymond Perkins, who booked them into a wide variety of clubs in the busy Queen Street West scene. Some of these clubs, including The Rex and the Drake Hotel, were not live-music venues until Perkins booked his bands into them.

In 1981, Boys Brigade entered the 'Homegrown' contest of Toronto radio station Q107. Every year, the station released an album of the best of the contest's submissions, and the Boys Brigade song "Mannequin" was included in the compilation. This led to their meeting Howard Ungerleider, the show lighting designer and director for Rush. He became their manager, very briefly, before signing the band over to Ray Danniels' SRO Management, who got them a record deal with Anthem Records. But, through Ungerleider, Rush frontman Geddy Lee was introduced to the band and was sufficiently impressed that he agreed to produce the band's debut album.

Boys Brigade was released in 1983. The album spawned two singles, "The Passion of Love" and "Melody". Both songs stayed in the top-40 in most markets; "Melody" peaked at #15 in Toronto and stayed in the top-20 for nine weeks; it peaked at #104 on Billboard's US charts. Videos for "Melody" and "The Passion of Love" ran on MuchMusic; the song "Into the Flow" appeared on the soundtrack to the Canadian film Heavenly Bodies starring Cynthia Dale the following year.

The band went on a tour of Canada and the US Eastern Seaboard, including a show at The Chance in Poughkeepsie, New York which was recorded for the King Biscuit Flower Hour and included a ten-minute medley combining Del Shannon's "Runaway" and a hi-tech new wave version of Bob Dylan's "Blowin' In The Wind".

Internal tensions led to the band's break-up a few months later. Burn went on to a solo career, and is a Grammy Award-winning record producer. Lester recorded two albums with Strange Advance, became a session musician and produced several independent albums.

== Discography ==
Albums

- Boys Brigade (1983), (Anthem/Capitol-EMI) ANR-1-1040

Singles

- "Melody" / "Africa" (1983), (Anthem/Capitol-EMI) ANS-056
- "The Passion of Love" / "Exodus" (1983), (Anthem/Capitol-EMI) ANS-053
- "The Passion of Love" / "Into The Flow" (1983), (Anthem/Capitol-EMI) 12CLJD-324

Compilations

- Q107 Homegrown Volume 3 (1981), Attic Records
- Hardest Hits Volume 5 (1994), SPG Music
- Boys Brigade / Built To Break (2019, split with National Pastime), VR Records
