= If They Knew =

Studio album by Kaz James
- Released: 11 October 2008
- Recorded: 2007–2008
- Genre: Pop, dance
- Label: Sony BMG

Singles from If They Knew
- 1. "Breathe" Released: 26 April 2008; 2. "We Hold On" Released: 13 September 2008; 3. "Can't Hold Back" Released: 24 January 2009

If They Knew is the debut solo album by Australian singer and DJ Kaz James. It was released in Australia and New Zealand in October 2008, after Bodyrockers split up in 2007.

James spent over a year working on the material for If They Knew. He stated in an interview that he recorded and mixed the tracks in the UK, Australia and Los Angeles before putting the finishing touches on the music in New York City. He described the music as "not about dance music so much as it's about music that people can dance to."

== Track listing ==
Australian Edition

1. "We Hold On" - 3:31
2. "Still Thinking About You" - 3:42
3. "Can't Hold Back" (featuring Macy Gray) - 2:32
4. "Hollywood" - 2:44
5. "You My Friend" - 3:51
6. "Cool Like You" (featuring The Last Goodnight) - 4:03
7. "Breathe" (featuring Stu Stone) - 3:22
8. "All Fall Down" (featuring DJ Lethal) - 3:35
9. "Subwoofers" (featuring Stu Stone) - 3:32
10. "Star" - 3:15
11. "I Did It Again" - 3:21

iTunes Bonus Track

12. "We Hold On" (Dave Spoon Remix) - 7:02

== Charts ==
Year	Chart	Peak position
2008	ARIA Hitseekers Album Chart	4

== Release history ==
Country	Release date	Format	Label	Catalogue
Australia	11 October 2008	CD Album, Digital Download	Sony BMG	88697365492
