= Joe Lamont =

- Origin: Australia
- Genres: Rock
- Occupations: Singer, songwriter, musician
- Instruments: Vocals, guitar
- Years active: 1979–present
- Labels: Private I Records

Joe Lamont (born July 24, 1963) is a rock singer, songwriter and musician. He released several singles and an album titled Secrets You Keep.

== History ==
=== Origins and Secrets You Keep ===
Lamont started his career in 1979 in Australia, where he released the single "Midnight Mover". He went on to release his highly acclaimed solo album Secrets You Keep in 1985 on the CBS-affiliated Private I label. A number of well-known notable session musicians guested on the album, including Dann Huff, Vinnie Colaiuta, Alan Pasqua, Paulinho da Costa, Richard Gibbs and Larry Williams. Secrets You Keep was released only on vinyl, but in 2010, the album was re-released onto CD by Yesterrock, a German label specializing in reissues.

=== Heavenly Bodies, Quiet Cool and Return of the Living Dead ===
Lamont also wrote and performed songs for various films in the 1980s. In 1984, Lamont appeared on the original motion picture soundtrack of the film Heavenly Bodies, with his song "Love Always Wins". In 1985, Lamont wrote the song "Fright Night", performed by The J. Geils Band, for the film Fright Night. In 1986, his song "Quiet Cool" was the theme to the film of the same name. The following year, the instrumental version of "Quiet Cool" also appeared in the VHS home video version of the horror film A Nightmare on Elm Street 3, later replaced back from the theatrical and future DVD release of Into the Fire by Dokken. In 1988, another song Lamont wrote and performed was "Pride and Joy" for the sequel A Nightmare on Elm Street 4; the song, however, did not appear on the film's soundtrack release. Also in 1988, featured on the soundtrack of the film Return of the Living Dead Part II is the song "Flesh to Flesh".

=== "Victims of Love" ===
Lamont's song, "Victims of Love", a power ballad from the album Secrets You Keep, became a huge hit in the Philippines and still remains popular to this day. Due to its popularity, Lamont has performed "Victims of Love" on Philippine television, on shows such as Wowowee and has even performed to the Filipino American communities in the U.S. as part of the Wowowee World Tour.

== Discography ==
=== Studio albums ===
- Secrets You Keep (1985), Private I

=== Singles ===
- "Midnight Mover" (1979), Junction
- "Secrets You Keep" (1985), Private I
- "Victims of Love" (1985), Private I
- "Love Always Wins" (1985), Private I

=== Soundtrack appearances ===
Title	Release	Soundtrack album
"Love Always Wins"	1984	Heavenly Bodies
"Quiet Cool"	1986	Quiet Cool
"Quiet Cool"	1987	A Nightmare on Elm Street 3 home video
"Pride & Joy"	1988	A Nightmare on Elm Street 4
"Flesh to Flesh"	1988	Return of the Living Dead Part II
"Anna Marie"	1989	Crack House
"You Take Me Higher"	1989	Crack House

=== Music videos ===
- "Secrets You Keep" (1985)
