= We Hold On =

Single by Kaz James

from the album If They Knew
- Released: 13 September 2008
- Genre: Pop, dance
- Label: Sony BMG
- Songwriters: Josh G. Abrahams, Kaz James
- Producers: Puretone, Kaz James

Kaz James singles chronology
"Breathe" (2008)	"We Hold On" (2008)	"Can't Hold Back" (2009)

"We Hold On" is the second single released by Australian singer Kaz James. The song is included on the singer's 2008 debut solo album, If They Knew. It peaked at #81 on the ARIA pop chart and at #2 on the ARIA dance chart in Australia.

== Track listing ==
Australian CD single

1. We Hold On - 3:31
2. We Hold On (Adam K & Soha Remix) - 5:43
3. We Hold On (Extended Club Mix) - 4:58

iTunes Bonus Track

4. We Hold On (Burns Mix) - 6:35

== Charts ==
Year	Chart	Peak position
2008	ARIA Singles Chart	81
2008	ARIA Physical Singles Chart	49
2008	ARIA Club Chart	2
2008	Australian Airplay Chart	32
2008/2009	Bright top 40	8

== Release history ==
Country	Release date	Format	Label	Catalogue
Australia	13 September 2008	CD single, Digital Download	Sony BMG	88697364502
