= Can't Hold Back (song) =

Single by Kaz James featuring Macy Gray

from the album If They Knew
- Released: 24 January 2009
- Genre: Electropop
- Length: 2:31
- Label: Sony BMG
- Songwriter(s): Kaz James; Dennis Dowlut; Macy Gray

Kaz James singles chronology
"We Hold On" (2008)	"Can't Hold Back" (2009)

Macy Gray singles chronology
"What I Gotta Do" (2007)	"Can't Hold Back" (2009)	"Beauty in the World" (2010)

"Can't Hold Back" is the third single released by Australian singer Kaz James, taken from his 2008 debut solo album, If They Knew. It is the singer's first solo top 50 single in Australia. Macy Gray is a featured vocalist on the song.

== Music video ==
A music video was shot and released. James uploaded the video onto his official YouTube channel on 11 January 2009, and it was made available for download on the Australian iTunes Store. It features both Kaz and Macy walking through corridors and standing within elevators. There are other rooms with different coloured backdrops in which both Kaz and Macy stand in front.

== Airplay ==
"Can't Hold Back" first began to receive promotion and airplay in late 2008 on the Nova Network. After its official release, it gained airplay on Today Network stations.

== Track listing ==
Australian CD single

1. "Can't Hold Back" – 2:31
2. "Can't Hold Back" (instrumental mix) – 2:31

iTunes bonus track

3. "We Hold On" (Beaucoup Disco Remix) – 5:39

== Charts ==
Chart (2009)	Peak position
Australia (ARIA)	42
Australian Physical Singles (ARIA)	36
Australian Artist Singles (ARIA)	8
Australian Dance Singles (ARIA)	5
Australian Club Singles (ARIA)	3
Australian Airplay (AUM)	93

== Release history ==
Country	Release date	Format	Label	Catalogue
Australia	24 January 2009	CD single, digital download	Sony BMG	88697462972
