= Breakthrough Entertainment =

Former Canadian production company

Breakthrough Entertainment Inc.
- Type: Private
- Industry: Television and Film Company
- Founded: 1986; 40 years ago in Toronto, Canada
- Defunct: 2023; 3 years ago
- Fate: Acquired by Shadow Pines Studios; Children's and family library sold to 9 Story Media Group
- Headquarters: Toronto, Canada
- Website: www.breakthroughentertainment.com/ (archived 5/25/2022)

Breakthrough Entertainment (formerly Breakthrough Films & Television) was a Canadian production company founded in 1986 by Peter Williamson and Ira Levy. It produced popular Canadian TV shows such as Jimmy Two-Shoes and Atomic Betty.

Based in Toronto, Ontario, Canada, Breakthrough Entertainment produced a variety of programming, including primetime comedy and drama series, factual entertainment, documentaries, television movies, feature films, kids' and family entertainment. The company licensed programs to major broadcasters in over 200 territories, handling worldwide pre-sales, co-productions, and third-party acquisitions.

On July 10, 2018, 9 Story Media Group acquired Breakthrough Entertainment's kids and family library and development slate.

In 2022, due to a shareholder dispute and disruption in production caused by the COVID-19 pandemic, Breakthrough Film & Television and all of its affiliated entities filed a Notice of Intention to make a Proposal under the Bankruptcy and Insolvency Act, hiring Dodick & Associates as the Trustee.

Sometime in 2023, Breakthrough Entertainment was acquired by Shadow Pines Studios. This means that employees at the company would shift to new positions at Shadow Pines Studios, and that they also manage Breakthrough's existing catalogue.

== Films and series ==
- The Adventures of Dudley the Dragon (1993–1997)
- The Adventures of Napkin Man! (2013–2017)
- Atomic Betty (2004–2008)
- Battlefields Mysteries (2013)
- Between the Sheets with Rebecca Rosenblat! (2005-2006)
- Bite (2013)
- Blood and Water (2014–2016)
- Bruno & Boots (2016–2018)
- Captain Flamingo (2006–2008)
- Children of Chelm (2011–2012)
- Class Act (2016)
- Coming of Age (1993)
- Crash Canyon (2011–2012)
- Design Match (2013)
- The Edge of Extinction (2013)
- Exchanging Vows (2013)
- Face to Face (2014)
- Faking a Murderer (2020)
- The Family Dance (2014)
- Femme Fatale (2015)
- For King and Country (2004)
- For King and Empire (2001)
- I Love Mummy (2002-2003)
- In Korea with Norm Christie (2016)
- Inside the Parole Board (2015)
- It Seems Like Yesterday (2014)
- Jenny and the Queen of Light (2016)
- Jimmy Two-Shoes (2009–2011)
- Kenny vs. Spenny (2003–2010)
- KidsWorld Sports (2005)
- Less Than Kind (2011–2013)
- Life's Little Miracles (1999-2007)
- L.M. Montgomery's Anne of Green Gables (2016)
- Lost Battlefields (2016)
- The Manic Organic (2017)
- Med Students (2002-2003)
- Medical Maverick (2013)
- Miss BG (2005)
- The Mr. Men Show (1997–1999)
- Max & Shred (2014–2016)
- My Big Big Friend (2009–2014)
- Out in Black (2015)
- Paradise Falls (2001-2008)
- Patient Files (2015–present)
- Pirate Express (2015)
- Please Kill Mr. Know It All (2010)
- Producing Parker (2008–2011)
- Real Men (2012)
- Ride (2016–2017)
- The Riot at Christie Pits (1996)
- Rocket Monkeys (2013–2016)
- The Secret Liberators (2017)
- Shadow Lake (2016)
- Shaye: This Is It (2016)
- Situation Critical (2016)
- Skooled (2016)
- Star Falls (2018)
- Stories of Mothers & Daughters (2017)
- Streets of the World! (2012)
- Striking Back! (2013)
- Swap TV (2014)
- Tooned! (2008–2009)
- The Toronto Show (2003–2005)
- Vandits (2022)
- Wandering Wenda! (2017)
- War of the Wheels (2005-2006)
- Zerby Derby (2018)
