= Heavenly Bodies (film) =

- Theatrical release poster
- Directed by: Lawrence Dane
- Screenplay by: Lawrence Dane; Ron Base
- Produced by: Robert Lantos; Stephen J. Roth
- Starring: Cynthia Dale; Richard Rebiere; Laura Henry; Walter George Alton
- Cinematography: Thomas Burstyn
- Edited by: Robert K. Lambert
- Production companies: Producers Sales Organization; RSL Films
- Distributed by: MGM/UA Entertainment
- Release dates: December 15, 1984 (Japan); February 1, 1985 (United States)
- Running time: 90 minutes
- Country: Canada
- Language: English
- Box office: $1.8 million

Heavenly Bodies is a 1984 Canadian drama film directed by Lawrence Dane, written by Dane and Ron Base, and starring Cynthia Dale, Richard Rebiere, Walter George Alton, Laura Henry, Stuart Stone and Patricia Idlette. It focuses on a single mother who quits her job and pursues her dream to open an aerobics studio, eventually competing with a fitness tycoon for a television aerobics instructor's grueling dance marathon.

The film premiered in Japan in December 1984 before being released in the United States and Canada on February 1, 1985, by MGM/UA Entertainment. Though a box-office disappointment, the film was particularly popular in Japan.

== Plot summary ==
Samantha quits her job to open her own aerobics studio and competes with a larger club's lead instructor to become an instructor on a local fitness television show.

== Cast ==
- Cynthia Dale as Samantha Blair
- Richard Rebiere as Steve
- Walter George Alton as Jack Pearson
- Laura Henry as Debbie Martin
- Stuart Stone as Joel Blair
- Patricia Idlette as K. C.
- Pam Henry as Patty
- Linda Sorenson as T.V. Producer
- Reiner Schwarz as T.V. Director
- Cec Linder as Walter Matheson
- Micki Moore as T.V. Reporter
- Sean Sullivan as Real Estate Salesman
- Mac Bradden as Nick
- Michael Tait as Mr. Howard
- Murray Westgate as Coach Hudson
- Elena Kudaba as Babysitter
- Sugar Bouche as Stripper
- Andrew Douglas as Marathon Official
- Brian Foley as Marathon Official
- Fay Foley as Marathon Official
- Howard Barish as Nervous Young Man
- Eric Fink as Gorillagram
- Reg Dreger as Chuck
- Anne Lévy as Woman Interviewer
- Dan Hennessey as Press Conference Reporter
- Deborah Kimmett as Press Conference Reporter
- Jo Bates as Girl In Locker Room
- Marsha Levine as Girl In Locker Room

== Production ==
Principal photography took place in Toronto.

== Release ==
Heavenly Bodies premiered in Japan on December 15, 1984. MGM/UA Entertainment acquired the rights for North American distribution based on a 45-minute promotional reel screened at the Cannes Film Festival, and released the film theatrically on February 1, 1985.

=== Home media ===
The film was released on Blu Ray by Fun City Editions in November 2024.

== Reception ==
=== Box office ===
The film performed poorly at the U.S. and Canadian box office, opening on 1,504 screens but only finishing in 11th place at the U.S. box office with a gross of $1,114,635 for the weekend. The film grossed a total of $1,839,623.

=== Critical response ===
Heavenly Bodies was poorly received by critics. On the review aggregator website Rotten Tomatoes, 17% of 18 critics' reviews are positive.

Ted Mahar of The Oregonian deemed it a "foolish, boring film," criticizing its focus on dance sequences. Scott Cain of The Atlanta Journal-Constitution similarly found the film un-involving and criticized its use of "bland disco music". Jay Carr of The Boston Globe gave the film a middling review, writing: "Heavenly Bodies tries for MTV slickness with its quick-cut exercise sequences, but it's square. Leotard-bright and leotard-deep, it falls apart when it rigs a final winner-takes-all showdown between exercise teams from the rich and poor studios."

Kevin Thomas of the Los Angeles Times gave the film a favorable review, describing it as "believable and involving," adding that it "benefits from some gritty Canadian realism." Vincent Canby of The New York Times observed that the film has "the manner and look of the world's longest music video," comparing it to Flashdance (1984), though conceding, "it is, possibly, funnier, especially in its climax in which the two competing exercise parlors have a locally televised, calesthentics equivalent to a bake-off."

== Soundtrack ==
Heavenly Bodies (Original Motion Picture Soundtrack)

Soundtrack album by Various
- Released: 1985
- Genres: New wave, pop, R&B
- Length: 37:30 (42:02 Japan)
- Label: Private I Records
- Producers: Irwin Mazur, Kevin Benson

The soundtrack to the film was released on LP, cassette and CD (in Japan only with an additional song) in 1985 on Private I Records in the US. "The Beast in Me" (US R&B #87, US Dance #31), "At Last You're Mine" (US R&B #27), "Heaven" (Japan only), and "Breaking Out of Prison" (South Africa only) were released as singles.

US LP and cassette (Private I Records)

1. "The Beast in Me" - Bonnie Pointer - 4:05
2. "Breaking Out of Prison" - Sparks – 4:13
3. "Out of Control" - The Tubes - 3:24
4. "At Last You're Mine" - Cheryl Lynn - 3:35
5. "Look What You've Done to Me" - Marc Tanner - 3:07
6. "Breakthrough" - Gary Wright - 3:58
7. "Keep On Working" - Dwight Twilley - 3:39
8. "Heaven" - Bonnie Pointer – 3:38
9. "Love Always Wins" - Joe Lamont - 3:59
10. "Into the Flow" - Boys Brigade - 3:45

Japan CD (Canyon)

1. "Heaven" - Bonnie Pointer – 3:38
2. "Breaking Out of Prison" - Sparks – 4:13
3. "Out of Control" - The Tubes - 3:24
4. "At Last You're Mine" - Cheryl Lynn - 3:35
5. "Work It" - Dazz Band - 4:31
6. "Look What You've Done to Me" - Marc Tanner - 3:07
7. "Breakthrough" - Gary Wright - 3:58
8. "Keep On Working" - Dwight Twilley - 3:39
9. "The Beast in Me" - Bonnie Pointer - 4:05
10. "Love Always Wins" - Joe Lamont - 3:59
11. "Into the Flow" - Boys Brigade - 3:45

== Sources ==
- Spielvogel, Laura (2003). Working Out in Japan: Shaping the Female Body in Tokyo Fitness Clubs. Durham, North Carolina: Duke University Press. ISBN 978-0-822-38480-9.
