= Skooled =

- Country of origin: Canada
- No. of seasons: 2
- No. of episodes: 16 x 30 minutes

Production
- Executive producers: Ira Levy; Peter Williamson
- Producers: Paul Kilback; Kirsty Nordal
- Running time: 30 minutes

Original release
- Network: TV Ontario

Skooled is a Canadian children's educational television series produced by Toronto production company Breakthrough Films & Television and originally broadcast on TVOntario in Canada, and syndicated to other networks throughout the world. The show was filmed at Lakefield College School in Smith-Ennismore-Lakefield, Ontario, near Peterborough.

The second season was filmed with a new cast, including the return of Phil Pallen as vice principal of the school. The second season was filmed at another private boarding school, Trinity College School in Port Hope, Ontario. The "students" of the school were secondary school teachers from all over Ontario.

== Show synopsis ==
The reality series follow five teenagers who swap roles with their teachers for eight days. During the exchange, the teenagers are responsible for teaching while the teachers participate as students in classes while covering subjects such as physical education, current issues, music, life skills and psychology. The role swap gives the teachers an opportunity to re-live the student life, while the teenagers learn how hard it is to teach and the challenges that comes with it.

== Domestic and international syndication ==
Skooled also airs additionally on several other provincial educational networks in Canada, and in the past, the defunct network BBC Kids.

The program also airs in the United States on the Heroes & Icons network and South Africa's e.tv.

== Episodes ==
Season 1
Ep. #	Episode Name	Episode Synopsis
101	A Skool is Born	The new students are given an orientation and shown their dorms, and have their very first class. Social Studies teacher Phil leads the charge as he puts the adults' knowledge of "kidspeak" to the test with a lesson in teen slang.
102	The Incredible Journey	The first full day of classes sets the bar high for this 8-day scholastic experiment. Arts teacher Selena has her 8 students perform Romeo and Juliet teen-style in her theatre class, and Phys-Ed teacher Erica leads a session of outdoor education that is more "Boot Camp" than Gym class! By the end of the day, exhaustion sets in and tempers begin to flare.
103	Making New Friends	The wacky Music teacher Julien makes a few enemies when a plan to inspire his students backfires—but he redeems himself with an incredible class on "Beats." And Holden, the Communications teacher, finds himself out of his depth while leading a lesson on the art of filmmaking.
104	Mid-Term Madness	It's halfway through the 8-day semester, and the kids surprise the adults with a session of individual midterm exams. But in a reversal of roles, the principal entreats the adults to secretly evaluate the kids' one-on-one teaching performances.
105	Raising the Bar	Erica shocks the adults when she takes them to a skateboarding park where they learn to grind, ollie, and make sick tricks with pro skater Stacey Venturo. Phil leads an outrageous class in teen fashion. At the end of the day, the kids introduce a new twist by selecting a "chosen one" for a special exemption.
106	Kickin' It Old School	The kids take the teaching to the streets, and the lessons turn "Old School." Holden educates the adults in the fine art of graffiti, while Julian busts out rhymes with special guests The A Team in an unforgettable rap class. After classes, the kids select the next "Chosen One" for special exemption.
107	Last Kick at the Can	The final full day of classes ends with Selena teaching the adults a hip hop dance routine, topping it off with the help of guests Ill Mannerz in a breakdancing lesson that is off the chain! Rob at first refused to participate, but then reluctantly joined. With classes finished, the adults get a chance to prepare for their upcoming exams with special tutorials—and the final "Chosen One" is selected.

Season 2
Ep. #	Episode Name	Episode Synopsis
201	Day 1	It's the first Day of Skool and Vice Principal Phil's first day on the job. His goal is for everyone to graduate, and he wonders what the new term will be like. The kids arrive and begin to learn what it takes to be a teacher; meanwhile the adults board the bus and anticipate becoming students. Things get heated in the welcoming assembly as some of the adults are still very much in teacher mode. There is a draw for dormitories, but no one seems to like the idea of sharing rooms. Later on in Psych class, Stereo Mike delivers a fun lesson on friendship, only some students take issue when she tries to group them into cliques. At the end of the day, the kids hold their first staff meeting and debate over how to skool their students. Stereo Mike has the job of posting the first marks, which leave many with questions....
202	Day 2	As the day begins we find out that the students have switched their rooms - something that Vice Principal Phil knows he is going to have to deal with. Things get off to a rocky start in Phyz Ed class as Tyler finds himself dealing with a safety issue. Meanwhile, an eager Yvonne tries to motivate her class on the dangers of industrialized food, only Rory openly declares that he is not interested. Later on, Rock Skool turns out to be a favourite, and the students are psyched over the competition between boys and girls. Vice Principal Phil then confronts the students about the room change, only to confirm that they are still very much in teacher mode and not respecting his authority. When the days marks are posted, many feel students feel they are unfair or unjustified, specifically Katherine who receives the first "F" of her life! It's been a long day packed with classes-only it's not over yet. Homework means the students get a chance to rock out!
203	Day 3	The students post marks for the teachers - a prank that doesn't go over so well. The teachers are discouraged and feel as though their authority is being disrespected. Vice Principal Phil knows this is an issue he is going to have to deal with but this prank is just the beginning. Later on in Psych class, Stereo Mike discovers that she is dealing with a case of plagiarism, meanwhile in Life Skillz, Cal is challenged to assert control of the classroom. Things look up in Issues as Yvonne manages to inspire her students, and together they form campaigns and hit the streets! At dinner time, Phil makes his move and attempts to win back the respect of his students - he doesn't want any more surprises. Finally, when the day's marks are posted, the students get a surprise of their own, as Cal, through a brilliant scheme, proves to be the hardest marker yet.
204	Day 4	It's midterm day, but these aren't tests of knowledge - they are tests of nerve. Students are asked to face their biggest fears in order to receive a total of 10 points, going towards their grade. Katherine gets stuck with Tyler, her least favourite teacher, and is asked to face her fear of heights. Meanwhile, Michael freaks out as Dre asks him to face his fear - the dark. Later on, Vice Principal Phil attends the staff meeting and there is a debate over what to do with Rory, the problem student. Phil also instructs the teachers that they need to step it up in the feedback department. Then, after a long day, and what is the official halfway point, the students and teachers finally get a chance to hang out.
205	Day 5	If the students think the day after midterms is going to be easy, they have another thing coming. Tyler's gruelling Phys Ed class is designed to put them to the test! Meanwhile, in Rock Skool, Dre discovers that the boys have not been keeping up with their homework. That afternoon, VP Phil decides to call one student to the principal's office, while Cal gives the rest of them a lesson on etiquette. In the evening the students face a mandatory formal dinner, where they must apply their new life skills. Will the students be on their best behaviour? And just when it looks as though the day is finally over, the teachers' introduce their rewards and punishment program.
206	Day 6	Yvonne teaches about poverty. While all students seem to be enjoying her class, one is still prone to getting out of line. Kaile's inflexible teaching style alienates her students in her class on trends and fads. The marking system continues to be an issue. The afternoon brings a mysterious field trip.
207	Day 7	With the upcoming afternoon talent show and exams just around the corner, Cal decides it's time from some stress management! Dre, on the other hand, leads a hectic two-part class. It's the guys vs. the girls in the battle of the bands. The evening's reward and punishment ceremony takes an unusual turn.
208	Day 8	There is no telling what examination day holds, as the students must draw assignments - both written and physical - from the Bowl of Destiny. At the final staff meeting, the teachers must decide who graduates: how will they settle a difference of opinion?

== Cast ==
STUDENTS SEASON 1

- Erica
- Julian "Whitefro"
- Holden
- Phil

TEACHERS SEASON 1

- Ryan Vickers
- Pina Viscomi
- Leanne Mladen
- Ben
- Rob Sicoli
- Faye

STUDENTS SEASON 2

- Calvin Rosemond
- Dondrea Erauw
- Tyler Chavez
- Yvonne Su

TEACHERS SEASON 2

- Norm
- Mari
- Jill
- Michael
- Catherine
- Dave
- Dan Ewing
- Darlene Runnalls

== Main crew ==
SEASON 1

- Producers: Paul Kilback, Ira Levy, Peter Williamson, Kirsten Scollie
- Directed by Paul Kilback
- Edited by Jay Tipping and David Grout

SEASON 2

- Producers: Paul Kilback, Ira Levy, Peter Williamson, Kirsten Scollie
- Directed by Paul Kilback
- Edited by Jay Tipping and Peter Watson
