= Ethel Austin =

English clothing retailer

Ethel Austin Ltd
- Company type: Private (Ltd)
- Industry: Retail
- Founded: Liverpool, England 1934
- Founder: Ethel Austin
- Defunct: 11 January 2013
- Fate: Administration
- Headquarters: Knowsley, Liverpool
- Products: Clothing
- Website: ethelaustin.co.uk (now closed)

Ethel Austin was an English clothing retailer. At its commercial peak it operated around three hundred stores. The company was purchased from the founding family in June 2002; the company ceased operation in January 2013, after entering administration several times.

== History ==
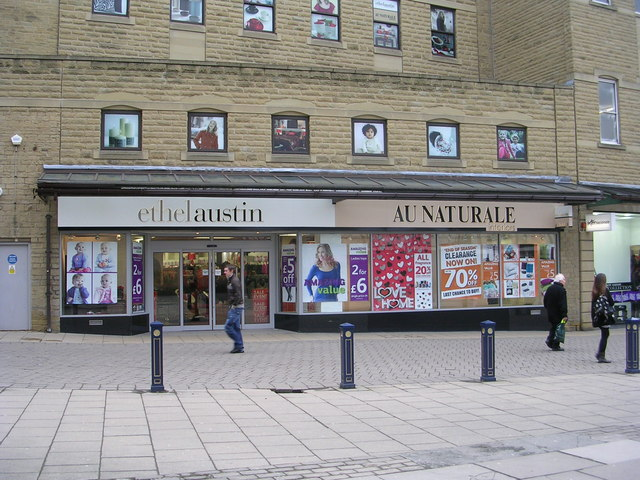
Ethel Austin, Huddersfield, West Yorkshire.

The company was founded in 1934 by Ethel Austin, in the front room of her terraced house in Liverpool, helping neighbours with their knitting. This proved so successful, that within five years of going into business, she had opened three shops. The business became a well known and established chain in the North West and North Wales throughout the mid to late twentieth century. Ethel Austin herself died in January 1989, at the age of 88.

In June 2002, the Austin family sold the business to a management team backed by Lloyds Development Capital (LDC) for £55 million. In June 2004, two years later, ABN-AMRO Capital bought the business for £122.5 million. In May 2007, it was announced that the company had won the contract to supply uniforms for the event of Liverpool - European City of Culture 2008.

In November 2007, the company ran new adverts on television, which used the BodyRockers song "I Like the Way (You Move)". At this point, the company had over three hundred stores.

== Difficulties and administration ==
On 15 April 2008, Ethel Austin Ltd entered administration, managed by Menzies Corporate Restructuring. The following day, it was announced that thirty-three stores would be closed within three weeks, with job losses totalling 275, and with an additional 181 employees to be made redundant at the company head office and distribution centre at Knowsley, Merseyside. On 19 May 2008, it was reported that Elaine McPherson, former boss of clothing chain MK One, had bought the company for an undisclosed sum, promising to return it to its 'former glory'.

On 8 February 2010, it was reported that the chain had gone into administration again. On 10 February 2010, administrators announced that there would be job cuts over 496 in the company's head office and distribution depot. It was anticipated that there would also be store closures totalling 196, resulting in further job losses.

On 19 August 2011, it was revealed that Ashloch Ltd, founded by the London based former Blackwell's director Sue Townsend, had purchased the company and the sixty-two remaining stores of Ethel Austin, saving over four hundred jobs. However, Ashloch was forced into administration managed by Duff & Phelps on 11 July 2012, after a landlord of a store in Manchester called in bailiffs after an unpaid rent bill, jeopardising the future of the company. Also in July, the brand was bought by Ricli Limited, owned by Liric owner Mike Basso.

The restructuring specialist GA Europe, a subsidiary of Great American Group, acquired the debt of Ashloch and operated the stores while the company was in administration. On 30 July 2012, Liric, a firm controlled by the clothing entrepreneur Mike Basso, acquired 32 of the Ethel Austin stores from GA Europe. On 11 January 2013, the company declared insolvency, and closed all of the remaining stores closed with immediate effect.

== Relaunch ==
In May 2015, a new store in Runcorn was announced. A clearance store also opened in Units 15 to 16a in Liverpool City Centre L1 1QE in 2016.
