= Vandits =

- Film poster
- Directed by: Stuart Stone
- Written by: Stuart Stone; Adam Rodness
- Produced by: Adam Rodness
- Starring: Tony Nappo; Francesco Antonio; Victoria Turko; Jesse Camacho
- Cinematography: Marc Forand
- Edited by: Nathan Boone; Thom Smalley
- Production companies: 5'7 Films; Farpoint Films
- Distributed by: Breakthrough Entertainment
- Release date: November 4, 2022
- Running time: 89 minutes
- Country: Canada
- Language: English

Vandits is a 2022 Canadian crime comedy film, co-written and directed by Stuart Stone. The film stars Tony Nappo as Sheldon, the leader of a small-time gang of stoners in Selkirk, Manitoba, who hatch a plan to rob a bingo hall on Christmas Eve, only to become trapped in a time loop in which their plan goes awry in a completely different manner each time they relive the heist.

The film's cast also includes Francesco Antonio, Victoria Turko and Jesse Camacho as Sheldon's accomplices Veeny, Jessie and Guy, Enrico Colantoni as the bingo hall owner Ned, Jann Arden as Blanche the snack counter lady, and Robb Wells as Ramone, an employee of the bingo hall with anger management issues.

The film received a brief theatrical release starting on November 4, 2022, in advance of being distributed principally on Amazon Prime and Hollywood Suite beginning December 15.

== Production ==
The film received some coverage during the production process when a truck containing approximately $250,000 worth of camera and lighting equipment was stolen from the shoot. Stone and his writing and producing partner Adam Rodness, who had earned a reputation as pranksters following their 2020 mockumentary film Faking a Murderer, initially struggled to get their announcement of the theft taken seriously, until they received a call from the thief demanding a ransom for the truck's return, enabling the Royal Canadian Mounted Police to verify the veracity of the report.

== Critical response ==
Chris Knight of the National Post rated the film 2.5 stars, writing that it got over principally on "Looney Tunes energy", while John Kirk of Original Cin graded the film a B, calling it essentially an updated version of Trailer Park Boys.

== See also ==
- List of films featuring time loops
- List of Christmas films
