= Kaz James =

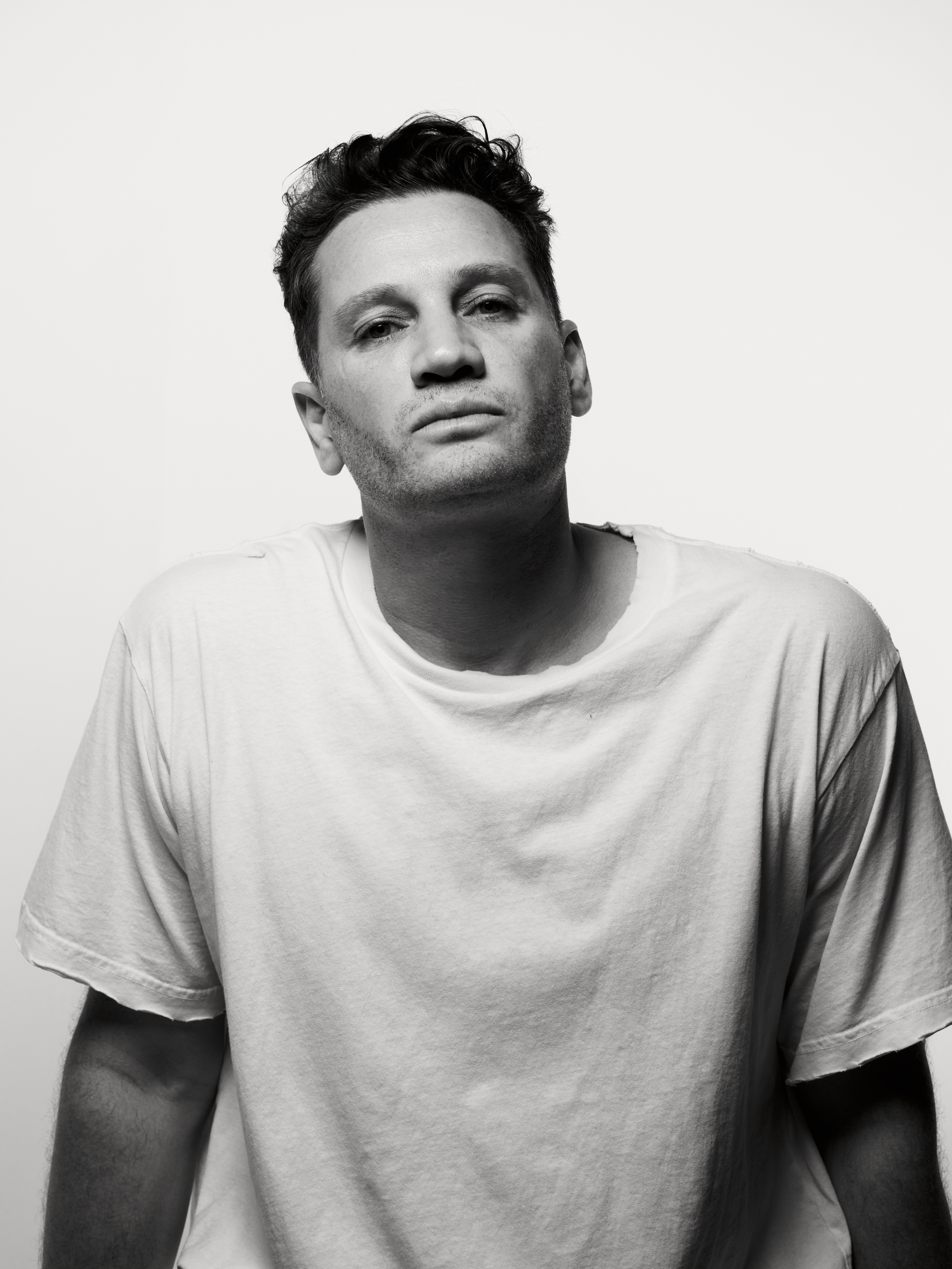
- Kaz James, Australian DJ and producer

Background information
- Origin: Melbourne, Australia
- Genres: Electronic, alternative dance, house
- Occupations: Singer-songwriter, DJ, record label owner
- Years active: 2004–present
- Label: krushes
- Formerly of: BodyRockers
- Website: www.kazjames.com

Kaz James is an Australian singer-songwriter and DJ. He was raised in Melbourne and is of Italian and Greek origin. He released his first solo album, If They Knew, in 2008.

Kaz James was a co-founder in 2004 of the group BodyRockers, an Australian British electronic music duo collaboration, consisting of Kaz James and Dylan Burns. BodyRockers released a self-titled album BodyRockers in 2005 and had an international hit with the single "I Like the Way" also in 2005 before disbanding in 2007.

In 2011, Kaz James and British businessman David Abrahamovich started a London coffee chain called Grind.

== BodyRockers ==
Before he started his career as a soloist, James was one half of BodyRockers, who rose to prominence in 2005 with their first release, "I Like the Way". This guitar-laden dance track reached No. 3 on the UK Singles Chart in April 2005 and achieved popularity in other regions of the world as well. A self-titled album was released, as was the group's follow-up single, "Round and Round". The duo, James and British guitarist Dylan Burns, toured extensively in 2005 and 2006 and recorded a second album, but according to James, "we just didn't get around to releasing it". BodyRockers then parted ways in 2006.

== Discography ==
=== Albums ===
Title	Details	Peak chart positions
Title	Details	AUS Hitseekers
If They Knew	Released: 11 October 2008; Label: Sony BMG; Formats: CD, digital download	4

=== Charted singles ===
Title	Year	Peak chart positions				Album
Title	Year	AUS	BEL (Fl) Tip	BEL (Wa) Tip	FRA	Album
"Breathe" (featuring Stu Stone)	2008	57	—	—	—	If They Knew
"We Hold On"	2008	81	—	—	—	If They Knew
"Can't Hold Back" (featuring Macy Gray)	2009	42	—	—	—	If They Knew
"Blast Off" (with David Guetta)	2014	—	33	9	33	Non-album single
"—" denotes a recording that did not chart or was not released in that territory.
