= BodyRockers (album) =

Studio album by BodyRockers
- Released: 5 May 2005
- Recorded: 2005
- Genre: Electronic; electronic rock; big beat; dance rock
- Length: 39:32
- Label: Universal Music Group
- Producer: Dylan Burns; Kaz James

Professional ratings
Review scores
Source	Rating
AllMusic	2.5/5 stars

BodyRockers is the self-titled only studio album of English–Australian electronic music duo BodyRockers, consisting of Dylan Burns and Kaz James, which was formed in 2004. After issuing of the album, the duo toured internationally in support of its release.

== Follow-up ==
Although BodyRockers recorded material for a second studio album for release, it was never issued and the group disbanded in 2007 with both Dylan Burns and Kaz James pursuing solo careers.

== Singles ==
The album notably contains the duo's 2005 international single, "I Like the Way", that reached No. 3 on the United Kingdom Singles Chart, No. 12 on the Australian ARIA Singles Chart, and the Top 20 on both the United States Billboard Hot Dance Club Play and Hot Dance Airplay Charts.

BodyRockers released the follow-up single "Round & Round" that charted on the Australian ARIA Singles Chart reaching No. 33.

== Track listing ==
BodyRockers track listing
No.	Title	Length
1.	"Handel on Your Face" (Dylan Burns, John Cale, Sterling Morrison, Lou Reed, Maureen Tucker, Gary Wilkinson)	4:42
2.	"I Like the Way" (Dylan Burns, Kaz James)	3:20
3.	"I Wanna Live" (Burns, James)	3:30
4.	"You Got Me Singing" (Burns, James)	4:16
5.	"Round and Round" (Burns, James)	3:23
6.	"Dirty" (Burns, James)	3:23
7.	"For One Night Only" (Burns)	3:00
8.	"Keep Your Boots On" (Burns)	3:12
9.	"New York City Girl" (Burns, James)	4:14
10.	"Dignity" (Burns)	2:45
11.	"Stuck in a Rut" (Burns, James Reynolds)	3:43
Total length:		39:28

== Charts ==
Chart performance for BodyRockers
Chart (2005)	Peak position
UK Albums (OCC)	84
