= Heckler (film) =

- Film poster
- Directed by: Michael Addis
- Produced by: Michael Addis; Jamie Kennedy
- Starring: Jamie Kennedy
- Edited by: Michael Addis; Tom McArdle; Alex Ward
- Distributed by: Echo Bridge Home Entertainment
- Release date: November 4, 2007 (AFI Fest)
- Running time: 80 minutes
- Country: United States
- Language: English

Heckler is a 2007 American documentary film about hecklers.

The film is hosted by actor and comedian Jamie Kennedy, who was inspired to create the movie after feeling hurt by the overwhelmingly poor reception of his 2005 film Son of the Mask, in which reviewers and fans of the original 1994 film attacked Kennedy personally rather than reviewing the film. Interviewees include comedians Louie Anderson, Kathy Griffin, Bobby Slayton, Patton Oswalt, Joe Rogan, Arsenio Hall, Carrot Top, Maria Bamford and George Wallace; medical doctor Drew Pinsky; writer Christopher Hitchens; political commentator Dennis Prager; producer Peter Guber; directors Joel Schumacher, George Lucas; film critics Leonard Maltin and Devin Faraci, director and musician Rob Zombie; and singer Jewel Kilcher.

Heckler also includes footage of much-derided filmmaker Uwe Boll's boxing matches with several of his most vocal critics.

== Release ==
Heckler premiered at the 2007 Tribeca Festival. The film never received a wide or limited release, going direct to DVD.

== Reception ==
Heckler received mixed reviews.

Jester Journal spoke negatively about Heckler, calling it a "misfiring attempt to take on hecklers and critics." Joel Keller from HuffPost said that the film became more about "Jamie's revenge" and called it a disappointment. Mother Jones called the film coarse, crass, yet surprisingly smart. Adam Renkovish from CultureMass called the film a "self-indulgent bait and switch."
