= Tony Nappo =

Canadian actor

- Born: Scarborough, Ontario, Canada
- Education: University of Toronto
- Occupation: Actor
- Years active: 1994–present

Antonio Nappo is a Canadian actor. He is best known for his roles in Four Brothers, Saw II, Land of the Dead, Bad Blood, and Born to be Blue. He also is the voice of Jimmy Falcone (McDougal) in Fugget About It.

== Early life ==
An Italian-Canadian, Tony was born and raised in Scarborough, Ontario, Canada. He attended the University of Toronto for two years before transferring to the American Academy of Dramatic Arts in New York City where he graduated in 1991.

== Career ==
In the first season of the based on real events crime-drama Bad Blood (2017–2018) Nappo played crime family "soldier" Gio.

Nappo plays maintenance guy Paul in the first season of TV series Strays (2021-) and also when the show returned for a second season in September, 2022.

Nappo took on the role of Michael in a 2013 run of the play God of Carnage at the Panasonic Theatre.

In the 2015 production (plus its 2017 encore run) of Nicolas Billon’s play Butcher, a dark thriller set in a police station in Toronto, Nappo played Inspector Lamb who's trying to unravel the unfolding mystery.

== Filmography ==
=== Film ===
Year	Title	Role	Notes
1994	Boozecan	Domenic	
1995	The Shamrock Conspiracy	Husky Man	
1995	The Donor	Joe	
1996	Conundrum	Cop #1	
1996	Radiant City	Moving Man #2	
1996	Mistrial	Citrano	
1997	Murder at 1600	Luchessi	
1997	Men with Guns	Marion	
1997	The Defenders: Payback	Officer Perez	
1999	Better Than Chocolate	Tony	
1999	Apocalypse II: Revelation	Willie Spino	
1999	Rabbit Punch	Eddie Fitzpatrick	
2000	The Spreading Ground	Detective Daniels	
2000	The Uncles	Enzo	
2001	Apocalypse IV: Judgment	Willie Spino	
2001	Boss of Bosses	Gene Gotti	
2001	Knockaround Guys	Tony the Waiter	
2001	Who Is Cletis Tout?	Fife	
2002	Power and Beauty	Johnny Roselli	
2002	Martin and Lewis	Jimmy Napoli	
2005	Land of the Dead	Foxy	
2005	Four Brothers	Charlie	
2005	Saw II	Gus	
2006	Homie Spumoni	Uncle Nicky Pollina	
2006	The Sparky Book	Driver	
2007	This Beautiful City	Crack	
2007	Saw IV	Gus	
2008	Hank and Mike	Stu	
2008	Jumper	NYPD Detective	
2008	Wisegal	Carmine	
2008	The Incredible Hulk	Brave Cop	
2008	Saw V	Gus	
2008	Killshot	Dockworker	
2009	You Might as Well Live	Eugene "Euge" Dillion	
2009	Behind Closed Doors	Bobby Argyle	
2009	How Eunice Got Her Baby	Cashier	
2009	U.S. Attorney	NYPD Detective	
2009	Shark City	Al	
2009	Defendor	Biker Cliff	
2009	Saturday	Luis	
2010	The Dogfather	Joey Viviano	
2010	Unrivaled	Ref Dangelo	
2010	Mother's Day	Dave Lowe	
2011	Stag	Paul	
2011	Moon Point	The Man in Charge	
2012	Beat Down	Jimmy	
2013	The Resurrection Of Tony Gitone	Bruno	
2013	Empire of Dirt	Fisherman	
2013	The Husband	Collin's Dad	
2013	Tru Love	Taxi Driver	
2014	Cheese	Cosimo	
2014	Americanistan	Babek	
2014	The Colossal Failure of the Modern Relationship	Darren	
2015	The Rainbow Kid	Ray	
2015	Born to Be Blue	Officer Reid	
2018	The Christmas Chronicles	Bartender Charlie	
2018	Zombies	Zevon (Dad)	TV film
2019	From the Vine	Enzo	
2019	In the Shadow of the Moon	Clark	
2019	Lie Exposed	Perry	
2020	Faking a Murderer	David Stoner	
2020	Sugar Daddy	Don	
2020	Zombies 2	Zevon (Dad)	TV film
2022	Zombies 3	Zevon (Dad)	TV film
2022	Vandits	Sheldon	
2024	The Light Before the Sun	Tony the Sound Guy	
2025	Thanks to the Hard Work of the Elephants		

=== Television ===
Year	Title	Role	Notes
1994	RoboCop: The Series	Thug	(Season 1, Episode 8 "Zone Five")
1994	Ready or Not	Crew Member	(Season 3, Episode 8 "Thin Ice")
1995	Kung Fu: The Legend Continues	Jiggs	(Season 3, Episode 11 "Goodbye Mr. Caine")
1996	Forever Knight	The Shark	
1996	Due South	Al	
1996–1998	F/X: The Series	Policeman	(Season 1, Episode 12 "Shivaree"); Tony (Season 2, Episode 4 "Unfinished Business" and Season 2, Episode 18 "Red Storm"); Detective Anthony Rizzo (Season 2, Episode 12 "Vigilantes")
1997	La Femme Nikita	Marco Dean	
1997	Psi Factor	Andre Block	
1998	Cupid	Hector	
1999	Da Vinci's Inquest	Lawyer	
2000	The Accuser	Phil Babbit (voice)	
2001–2004	Blue Murder	Randy Minette	(Season 2, Episode 7 "Collateral Damage"); Alfred Toscala (Season 3, Episode 5 "Ladykillers"); Mark Belassro (Season 4, Episode 11 "Cell Block 13")
2002	Doc	Officer Nappo	
2002	Tracker	Leon	
2002	Power and Beauty	John Roselli	Television film
2003	Street Time	Paul	
2003	Sue Thomas: F.B.Eye	Mike Russon	
2003	1-800-Missing	Attorney Leo Dupont	(Season 1, Episode 6 "Never Go Against the Family")
2004	The Grid	Buzz Corelli	
2004	Kevin Hill	Probate Attorney	
2004–2006	This Is Wonderland	Portella	
2004–2006	Covert One: The Hades Factor	Ubayy	
2005	Tilt	Johnny Gelcaiano	
2005	Kojak	Freddie	
2005	G-Spot	Jersey Guy	
2005–2006	Intelligence	Nick Ouzeris	Two episodes
2006	Da Vinci's City Hall	RCMP Inspector Zurokowski	
2006	Slings & Arrows	Lighting Guy	
2007	The Gathering	Hawkes	
2010	Bloodletting & Miraculous Cures	Bobby Dizon	
2010	Republic of Doyle	Frank	
2010	The Bridge	Terry	
2010	Nikita	Hershey	
2011	Breakout Kings	Frank Ferro	
2011	Flashpoint	Kenton	
2011–2012	King	Ray Arnold	
2012	The L.A. Complex	Strange Man	
2012	Saving Hope	Gino	
2012–2016, 2024–2025	Fugget About It	Jimmy Falcone/McDougal (voice)	
2013	Mayday	Flight Engineer Gerald Fiore	
2013	The Listener	Boone	
2013	Haven	Mike Gallagher	
2013	Played	Brandis	
2013	Cracked	Moderator	
2014	E.M.S.	Tony	
2014–2015	Remedy	Dr. Sam Guerra	(7 episodes)
2015	Hard Rock Medical	Sam Pisano	(Season 2, Episode 4 "Big Fish")
2015	Defiance	Father/Indur/Sgt. Frei Poole	(3 episodes)
2017	Bad Blood	Gio	(6 episodes of season 1)
2019	Creeped Out	VP Hawkins	(Season 2, Episode 5 “The Unfortunate Five”)
2020	Schitt's Creek	Motel Guy	(Season 6, Episode 4 "Maid of Honour")
2021	Cam Boy	Dad	
2021–2022	Strays	Paul	
2024	Star Trek: Discovery	Primarch Ruhn	2 episodes
2025	Ginny & Georgia	Josh Finn	8 episodes
