= Bitten (2008 film) =

- Directed by: Harv Glazer
- Written by: Tim McGregor; Tyler Levine
- Produced by: Robert Wilson
- Starring: Jason Mewes; Erica Cox; Richard Fitzpatrick; Nic Nac; Stuart Stone; Jordan Madley
- Cinematography: Simon Shohet
- Edited by: Ron Wisman Jr.
- Music by: Stu Stone
- Distributed by: RHI
- Release date: 29 June 2008
- Running time: 89 minutes
- Country: Canada
- Language: English

Bitten is a 2008 Canadian black comedy vampire film directed by Harv Glazer. It stars Jason Mewes as a paramedic who rescues Danika (Erica Cox), a female vampire, from an alley way.

== Plot ==
Jack, a paramedic, is frustrated with his life after he breaks up with his girlfriend. He discovers a girl (Danika) in an alleyway covered in blood, clinging to life. Jack takes Danika in and soon discovers that she is a vampire.

Jack and Danika try to find a way to feed her cravings to drink blood while killing as little as possible. All their attempts end without success because a vampire needs fresh human blood. Jack also must find places to hide the bodies in his apartment, including the body of his ex-girlfriend, who had gone to his apartment to reclaim several of her possessions before Danika had bitten and killed her. Jack discovers upon his ex-girlfriend's corpse reanimating into a vampire (and having to kill her when she attacks him in a rage) that only a stab to the heart will kill a vampire.

When Danika becomes more violent, killing several people, including a young woman, Jack is forced to kill her with the help of Roger, his paramedic co-worker and friend. Roger stabs Danika in the heart while she attacks Jack and kills her, but not before Jack is bitten. Jack becomes a vampire, cared for by Roger, who feeds him from a dish of blood.

== Cast ==
- Jason Mewes as Jack
- Erica Cox as Danika
- Richard Fitzpatrick as Roger
- Nic Nac as Pusher
- Stuart Stone as Twitch
- Jordan Madley as Sherry
- Grace Armas as Mrs. Lee
- Amy Lynn Grover as Maya
- Jeff Pangman as Day Shift EMT
- Shawn Goldberg as Junkie
- Stefan Brogren as Bearded Man
- Suresh John as Store Owner

== Release ==
It aired on Sci Fi Channel on March 15, 2009. RHI Entertainment released it on DVD on July 6, 2010.

== Reception ==
Mark Voger of NJ.com recommended it to fans of Mewes and said that the film, despite its "considerable flaws", is better than many competitors. R.L. Shaffer of IGN rated it 3/10 stars and wrote, "Bitten had tremendous potential to be pretty darn amusing, but it fails on nearly every conceivable level." Steve Barton of Dread Central rated it 2.5/5 stars and wrote that the film's tone is ruined by out-of-place slapstick. Annie Riordan of Brutal as Hell wrote that the film remains entertaining despite its lack of originality. Jeremy Blitz of DVD Talk rated it 2.5/5 stars and wrote, "The humor and the horror counteract rather than reinforce each other."
