= BodyRockers =

2004–2007 English-Australian electronic music duo

- Origin: Herne Bay, Sturry Kent, England; Melbourne, Victoria, Australia
- Genres: Electronic, house, electronic rock, dance-pop, dance rock
- Years active: 2004–2007
- Labels: Universal, Mercury
- Past members: Dylan Burns; Kaz James

BodyRockers were an English–Australian electronic music duo, consisting of Dylan Burns and Kaz James, which formed in 2004. Their 2005 single, "I Like the Way", reached No. 3 on the United Kingdom Singles Chart, No. 12 on the Australian ARIA Singles Chart, and the Top 20 on both the United States Billboard Hot Dance Club Play and Hot Dance Airplay Charts. They issued a self-titled album that year and toured internationally in support of its release. Although they recorded material for a second album it was not issued and the group disbanded in 2007 with both Burns and James pursuing solo careers.

== Background ==
BodyRockers formed in 2004 as an electronic music duo, consisting of Dylan Burns and Kaz James. Burns (ex-ColourSound), a British singer-guitarist from Herne Bay, England, was visiting Melbourne, Australia when he was introduced to James by another DJ, Jason Herd. James had worked as a House music DJ in Australia and then "played everywhere from Italy to Greece, Spain, Japan and Mykonos". The pair first played together with Burns on guitar over James' rocky DJ set. Within a month of their first meeting, the duo created "I Like the Way", a song loosely based on Billy Idol's 1987 cover version of "Mony Mony" by Tommy James and the Shondells. Released as a single in April 2005, it reached No. 3 on the UK Singles Chart; No. 12 on the Australian ARIA Singles Chart; and made the Top 20 on both the United States Billboard Hot Dance Club Play and Hot Dance Airplay Charts.

The success of "I Like the Way" allowed BodyRockers to tour internationally throughout 2005 and into 2006. In a 2007 interview, James described this era as "amazing times! We toured the world with a band and sold a shit-load of records". In late 2005, the group released a follow-up single, "Round and Round", which reached the ARIA Singles Chart Top 40. Both songs appeared on their debut 2005 album, BodyRockers. They recorded a second album, however the two mutually decided not to release it and instead to pursue their own career paths. As James stated, "Since then we have moved on and actually made a second album but decided that we both wanted to go down different paths in our lives and going on the road as BodyRockers again for another three years promoting another album wasn't what we wanted".

== Appearances in other media ==
The song "I Like the Way" has been featured in advertisements for BMW, Citroen, Ford, Mitsubishi, Hyundai, Diet Coke, DirecTV, and Ethel Austin. It was used as promotional music for a 2005 Victoria's Secret fashion show as well as for the 2007 Hong Kong Sevens rugby tournament.

The song "Round and Round" appears on the Bumpers and ID's of Canal 13 Argentina of 2013

== Discography ==
=== Albums ===
List of albums, with selected peak chart positions
Year	Album	Peak chart positions
Year	Album	UK
2005	BodyRockers	84

=== Singles ===
List of singles, with selected peak chart positions and certifications
Title	Year	Peak chart positions										Certification	Album
Title	Year	AUS	AUT	BEL	CAN	DEN	ITA	NZL	NLD	UK	US Dance	Certification	Album
"I Like the Way"	2005	12	17	33	9	8	20	7	51	3	20	ARIA: Gold	BodyRockers
"Round & Round"	2005	35	—	—	—	—	—	—	—	—	—		BodyRockers

== Awards and nominations ==
=== ARIA Music Awards ===
The ARIA Music Awards is an annual awards ceremony that recognises excellence, innovation, and achievement across all genres of Australian music.

Year	Nominee / work	Award	Result
2005	"I Like the Way (You Move)"	Best Dance Release	Nominated
