= Jamie Kennedy =

American actor and comedian (born 1970)

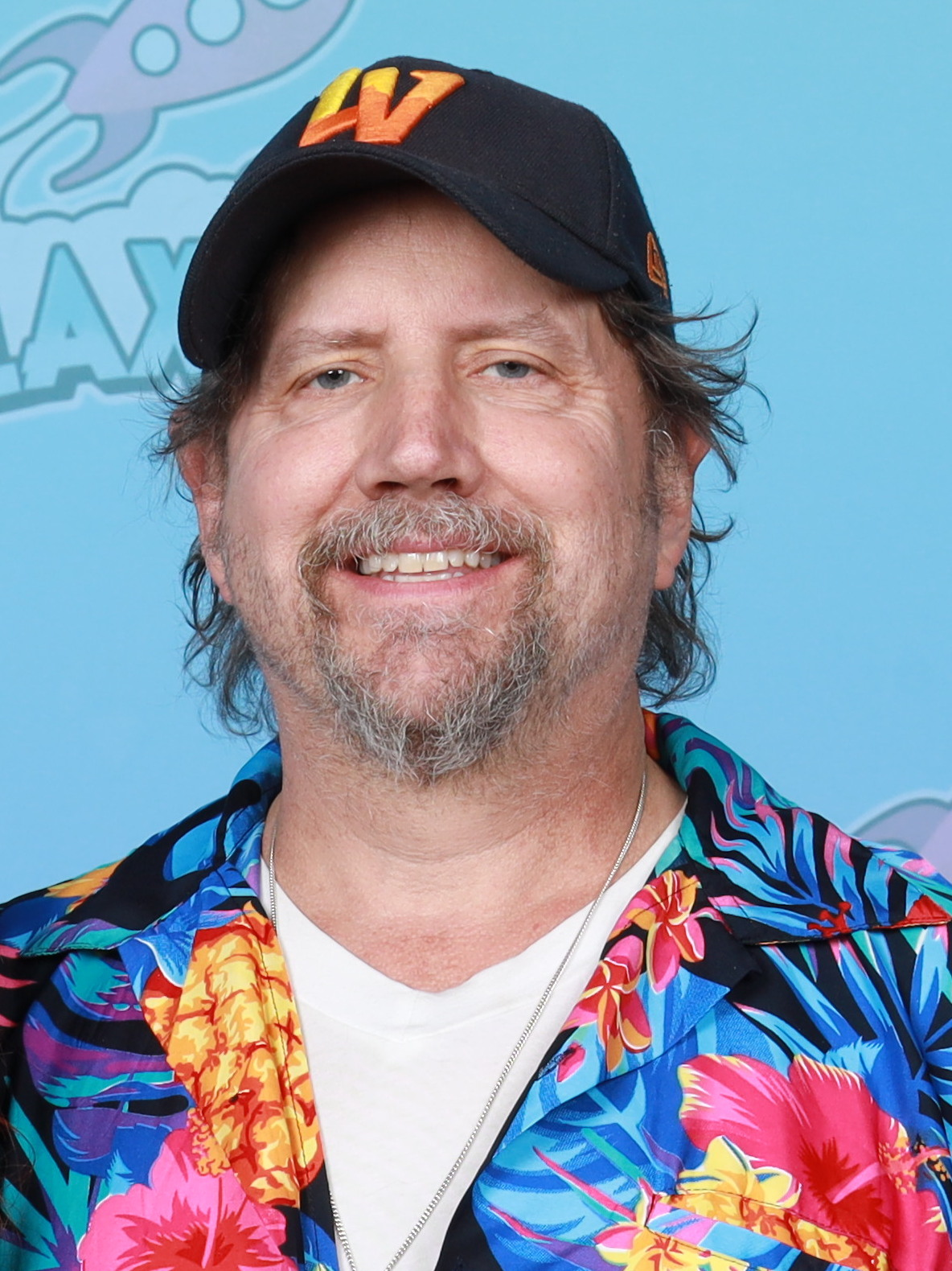
- Kennedy in 2025
- Born: James Harvey Kennedy; May 25, 1970 (age 56); Upper Darby Township, Pennsylvania, U.S.
- Occupations: Actor; comedian; screenwriter; producer
- Years active: 1989–present
- Partners: Jennifer Love Hewitt (2009–2010)

James Harvey Kennedy (born May 25, 1970) is an American actor and comedian. Kennedy played Randy Meeks in the Scream film series (1996–2000), which saw him as a supporting character in the first and third installments and a lead ensemble member in the second installment. He has also had lead roles in Malibu's Most Wanted (2003), Son of the Mask (2005), Kickin' It Old Skool (2007), Finding Bliss (2009), Trick (2019), and Roe v. Wade (2020). He has had supporting roles in films such as Romeo + Juliet (1996), Enemy of the State (1998), Bowfinger (1999), Three Kings (1999), Boiler Room (2000), Max Keeble's Big Move (2001), and Good Deeds (2012).

In television, Kennedy hosted the WB sketch comedy series The Jamie Kennedy Experiment (2002–2004) and played the roles of Professor Eli James on the CBS series Ghost Whisperer (2008–2010) and Dr. Callahan on the NBC medical comedy-drama series Heartbeat (2016). He has had recurring voice roles on the Fox sitcom The Cleveland Show (2009–2013), the Nickelodeon series Fanboy & Chum Chum (2009–2014), and the Comedy Central sitcom Legends of Chamberlain Heights (2016–2017).

== Early life ==
Kennedy was born on May 25, 1970, in Upper Darby Township, a suburb of Philadelphia, Pennsylvania. Kennedy was raised Catholic. He attended and graduated from Monsignor Bonner High School in 1988.

== Career ==
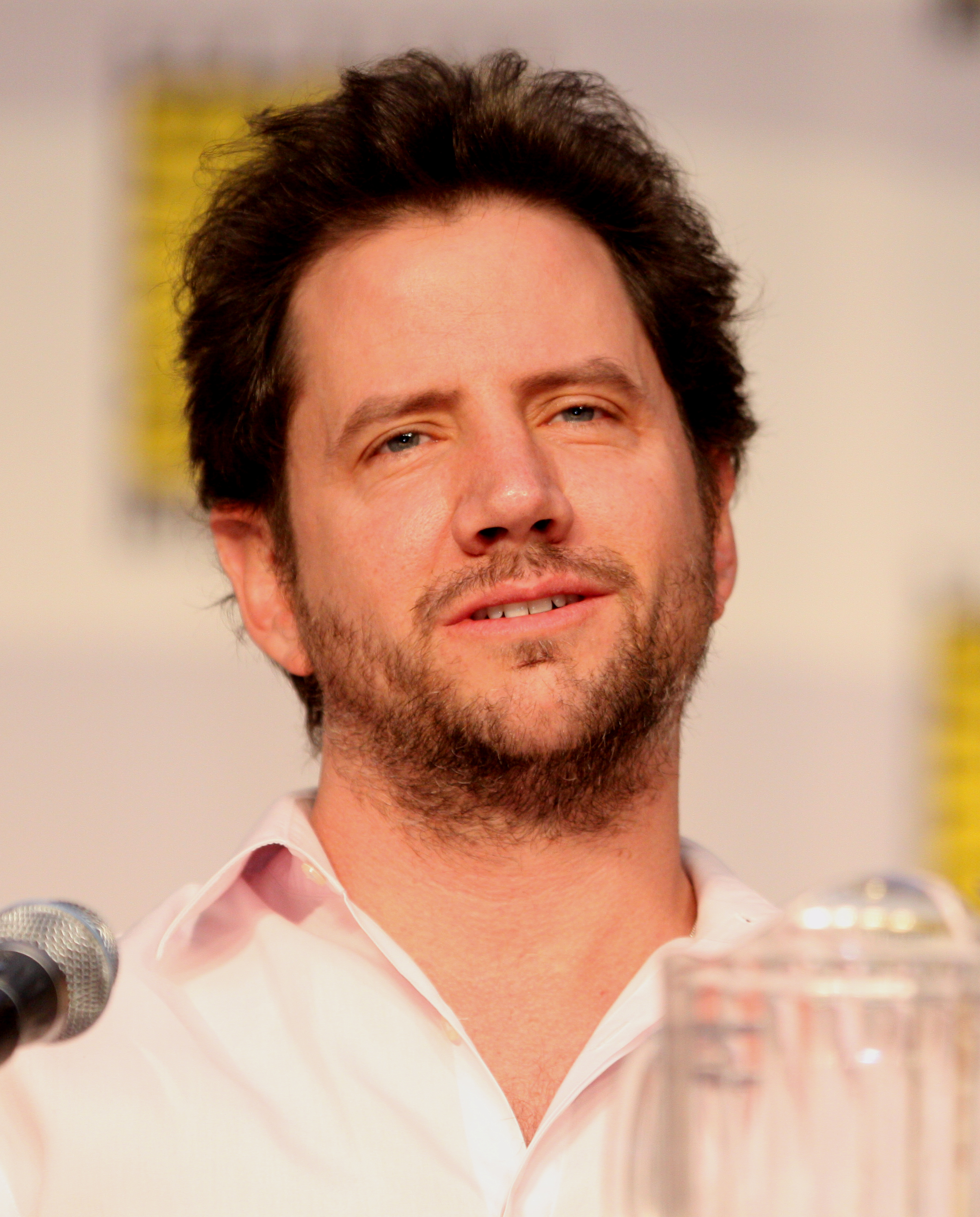
Kennedy at the 2010 San Diego Comic-Con

When Kennedy first arrived in Los Angeles, he became a professional Hollywood extra.

After a few years of struggling, Kennedy was unable to find an agent and worked as a host at Red Lobster. He auditioned for over 80 commercials and could not book one. He then took a job as a telemarketer and learned that he had a talent for selling things. Kennedy then thought that if he could sell anything, "why not sell myself?", becoming his own agent.

Kennedy created a false persona, screen agent "Marty Power", to attract the attention of real agents and managers over the phone, who would later book his performances. He came to prominence in the late 1990s for playing Randy Meeks in the Scream film series. His lead role as Tim Avery in Son of the Mask earned him a Golden Raspberry Award nomination for Worst Actor. He would later voice his experiences with the film on his YouTube channel years after the film's release. The film would also go on to inspire Kennedy to host the 2007 documentary Heckler after feeling hurt by the film's poor reception in which some reviewers attacked him personally.

Kennedy formed a production company called Wannabe Producers, alongside Josh Etting, through which he has produced the shows The Jamie Kennedy Experiment, Blowin' Up, The Starlet, and Living with Fran created by David Garrett. Following Malibu's Most Wanted, in which he both wrote and starred, Kennedy co-wrote the MTV show Blowin' Up (2006) featuring his friend, Stu Stone.

Kennedy lent his voice to the videogame ESPN NFL 2K5 as a celebrity adversary with his own football team, the Upper Darby Cheesesteaks. He is also unlockable as a free agent tight end in season mode. His stint as Activision's emcee at Electronic Entertainment Expo 2007, however, drew much criticism not only for his ignorance of the industry, but also for appearing to perform drunk as he insulted the audience. In a video uploaded to YouTube on June 14, 2021, Kennedy claimed that Activision had scrapped his script at the last minute and he was ad-libbing his jokes while suffering from burnout.

While working on his film Malibu's Most Wanted, Kennedy wrote an autobiography titled, Wannabe: A Hollywood Experiment. The book chronicles his life in Hollywood as he attempts to become a star. It gives background on his life and family and quickly dives into his adventures. It tells of such things as Kennedy's living conditions in the Hollywood slums, his dilapidated car, and his kidney issues.

A performer of stand-up comedy, he is also known for his sketch performances on his television reality show, The Jamie Kennedy Experiment, which became the WB Network's highest-ranking new show in 2002, but which was cancelled in April 2004 due to falling viewership. In 2006, Jizzy Entertainment released Unwashed: The Stand-Up Special. In 2008, Kennedy released the documentary Heckler, about the plight of stand-up comics versus their often-aggressive audiences. In 2007 and 2017, he made two appearances in Criminal Minds as a cannibal satanist serial killer.

From 2008 to 2010, Kennedy played psychology professor Eli James in the CBS drama Ghost Whisperer. From 2009 to 2013, he was in the TV series, The Cleveland Show, playing Roberta Tubbs' boyfriend.

He also stars in Nicktoons' Fanboy & Chum Chum as Kyle, an insecure boy wizard who loathes the fun-loving Fanboy and Chum Chum, but who secretly yearns for their friendship. In April 2010, sources reported that Kennedy would very likely return to the Scream franchise to star in the fourth installment; however, according to Scream screenwriter Kevin Williamson, plans were never made for him to rejoin the franchise, attributing the misinformation to a fabrication by Kennedy.

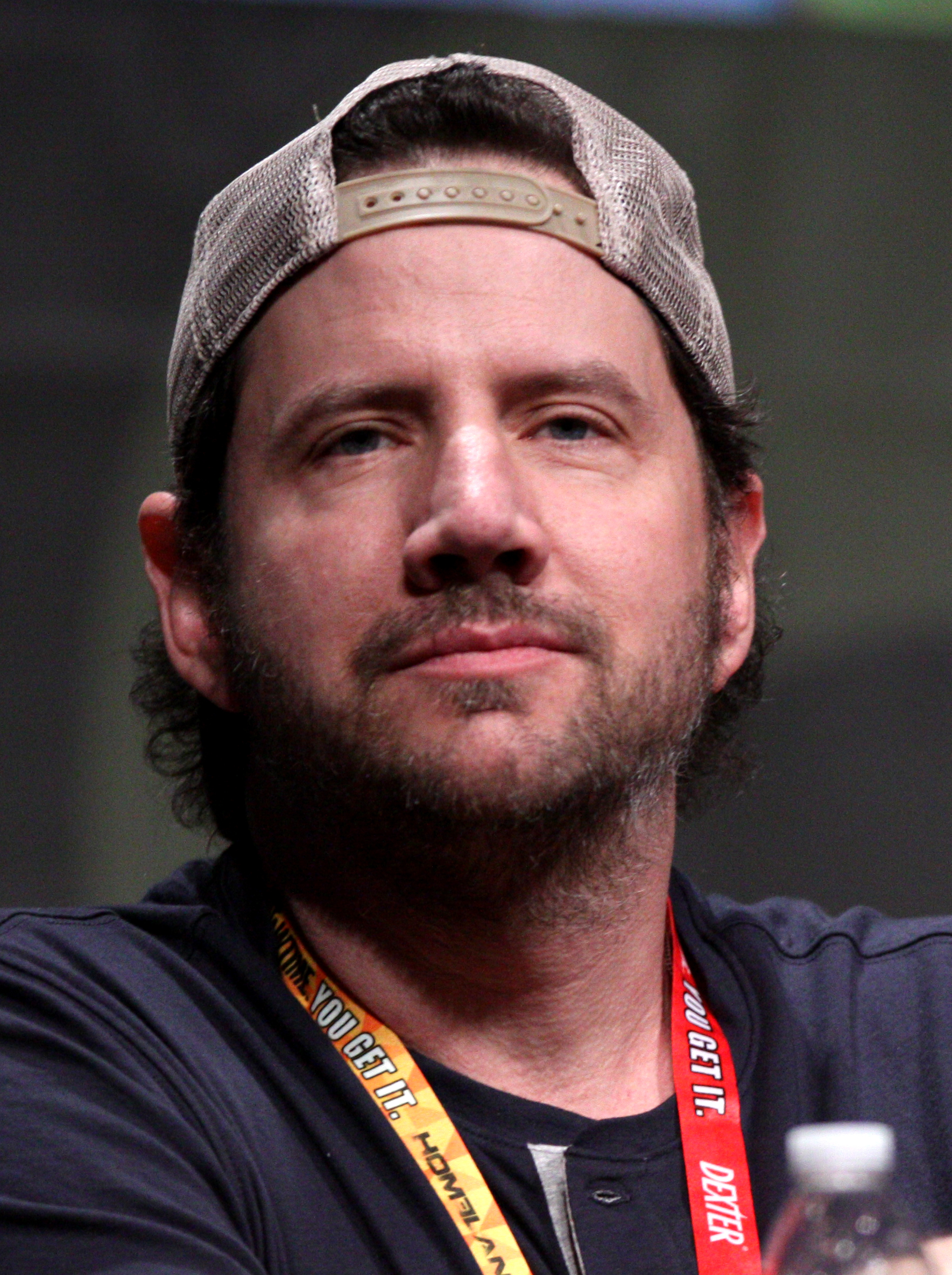
Kennedy in 2012

On December 31, 2012, Kennedy hosted and produced First Night 2013 with Jamie Kennedy, a New Year's Eve television special widely considered one of the worst shows of all time. His film Lost & Found in Armenia, in which he plays an American tourist who ends up in an Armenian village, accused of being a Turkish spy, later opened to select theatres on June 7, 2013. His film Buddy Hutchins, in which Kennedy plays a down-on-his-luck recovering alcoholic, was released in 2015. In 2015, he portrayed Frump in the Colton Tran adventure mystery film Gloom and Beach Patrolman Alex in Allegra Pictures' horror film The Sand. In 2015, he also starred as Travis Welker in Tremors 5: Bloodlines and as Rob in Rivers 9.

Kennedy played NARAL Pro-Choice America founder Larry Lader in the 2020 film Roe v. Wade, which stars a predominantly conservative ensemble cast. In an interview with The Daily Beast, which noted the film depicts Lader as "a shady figure pulling strings from behind the scenes who treats abortions as a money-making operation," Kennedy said he personally supports abortion rights and appeared in the film to perform in a dramatic role that he is not normally offered, and that, "it’s also not fair for people to think that because I’m in a project with them that I’m like that, or that I believe in this stuff."

== Personal life ==
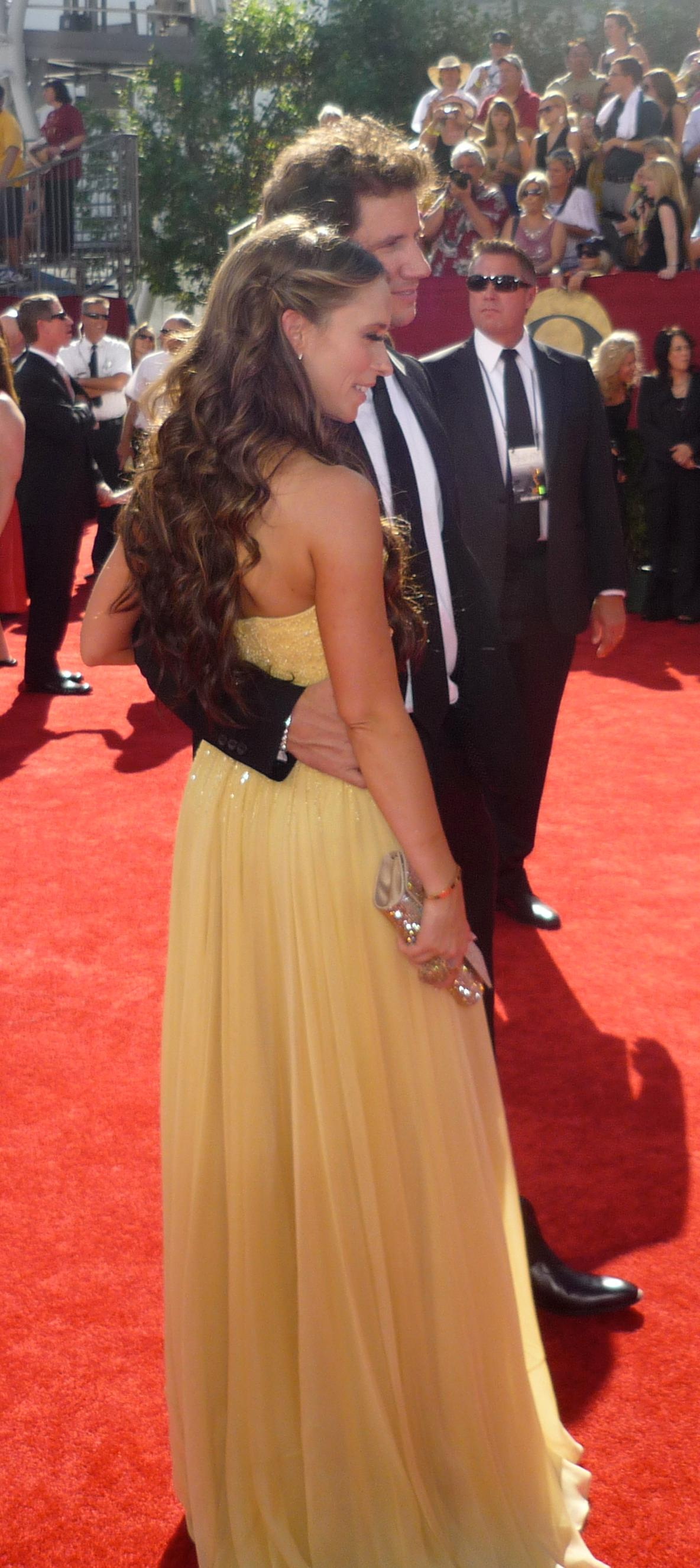
Kennedy with then-girlfriend Jennifer Love Hewitt at the 2009 Primetime Emmy Awards

Kennedy dated his Ghost Whisperer co-star Jennifer Love Hewitt from March 2009 to March 2010.

== Political views ==
Kennedy supported Spencer Pratt's 2026 Los Angeles mayoral campaign and promoted claims that the election was rigged after Pratt failed to move on past the primary stage and face Karen Bass in the general election. Kennedy referred to the election as a "literal crime scene" and also said "There is no way this is an honest election."

In an August 2026 episode of his podcast, Kennedy spoke about his political views, describing himself as open to evaluating policies across party lines. He said that expressing agreement with Republican or Trump administration positions had led others to label him "MAGA" or a "maggot," and questioned what he called a lack of inclusion on the political left, stating, "How can you say that you're the party of inclusion when you don't include us?" During the episode he also discussed the COVID-19 pandemic response and referenced performing a stand-up show in a parking lot to support a bar affected by lockdown restrictions.

== Filmography ==
=== Film ===
Year	Title	Role	Notes
1989	Dead Poets Society	Extra	Uncredited
1996	Romeo + Juliet	Sampson	
1996	Scream	Randy Meeks	
1997	Coax	Jamie	Short film
1997	Bongwater	Tommy	
1997	On the Edge of Innocence	Luke Canby	TV movie
1997	Clockwatchers	Eddie	
1997	Sparkler	Trent	
1997	Scream 2	Randy Meeks	
1997	As Good as It Gets	Street Hustler	
1998	Stricken	Banyon	
1998	Starstruck	George Gordon Flynn	
1998	The Pass	Deputy Jim Banks	
1998	Soundman	Frank's Assistant / Marty (voice)	
1998	Enemy of the State	NSA Agent Jamie	
1999	Bowfinger	Dave	
1999	Three Kings	Walter Wogaman	
2000	Road to Flin Flon	Brad	
2000	Boiler Room	Adam	
2000	Scream 3	Randy Meeks	Cameo
2000	Bait	Agent Blum	
2000	The Specials	Amok	
2001	Slacker Cats	Buckley (voice)	TV movie
2001	Dr. Dolittle 2	Various (voice)	
2001	Jay and Silent Bob Strike Back	Chaka's Production Assistant	
2001	Max Keeble's Big Move	Evil Ice Cream Man	
2001	Pretty When You Cry	Albert Straka	
2002	Bug	Dwight	
2003	Malibu's Most Wanted	Brad 'B-Rad' Gluckman	Also writer
2003	Sol Goode	Justin Sax	
2003	Harold & Kumar Go to White Castle	Creepy Guy	Uncredited
2005	Son of the Mask	Tim Avery / The Mask	
2005	Dinotopia: Quest for the Ruby Sunstone	Spazz (voice)	
2006	Farce of the Penguins	Jamie (voice)	
2007	Me & Lee?	Joel	TV movie
2007	Kickin' It Old Skool	Justin Schumacher	
2007	Larry the Cable Guy's Christmas Spectacular	Ghost of Christmas Past	TV movie
2007	Extreme Movie	Mateus	
2007	Heckler	Himself	
2009	Finding Bliss	Dick Harder	
2009	Curious George 2: Follow That Monkey!	Danno Wolfe (voice)	
2010	Cafe	Dealer	
2011	Spring Break '83	Ballzack	
2011	Still Screaming: The Ultimate Scary Movie Retrospective	Himself	Documentary film
2012	Bending the Rules	Theo Gold	
2012	The Patriot of America	Frank (voice)	
2012	The Reef 2: High Tide	Ronny (voice)	
2012	Good Deeds	Mark Freeze	
2012	Lost & Found in Armenia	Bill	
2013	Foreclosed	Forrest Hayes	
2014	The Hungover Games	Justmitch	Also writer and producer
2014	The After	David	TV movie
2014	Nowhere Safe	Kevin Carlisle	TV movie
2014	Bermuda Tentacles	Dr. Zimmern	TV movie
2015	Buddy Hutchins	Buddy	
2015	Other Plans	Nathan McKeon	
2015	Tremors 5: Bloodlines	Travis B. Welker	Video
2015	The Sand	Alex, Beach Patrol	
2016	Drawn of the Dead	Adam Simmons (voice)	
2016	Mostly Ghostly: One Night in Doom House	Simon	
2016	Surviving Compton: Dre, Suge & Michel'le	Jerry Heller	TV movie
2017	Walk of Fame	Hugo	
2018	Surviving the Wild	Kristopher	
2018	Spinning Man	Ross	
2018	Tremors: A Cold Day in Hell	Travis B. Welker	
2019	Trick	Dr. Steven	
2020	Roe v. Wade	Larry Lader	
2020	Jamie Kennedy: Stoopid Smart	Himself	
2021	Last Call	"Whitey"	
2022	Scream	Partygoer	Voice cameo
2023	Don't Suck	Pete	
2025	Namaka	Guy Torino	

=== Television ===
Year	Title	Role	Notes
1994	VR Troopers	Elmo	Episode: "Cybertron (Pilot)"
1994	California Dreams	Sea Kelp	2 episodes
1995	Unhappily Ever After	Stoney / Pony Burger Attendant	3 episodes
1995	Ellen	Tad	2 episodes
1997	Perversions of Science	Spaceman John	Episode: "Panic"
2000	Stark Raving Mad	Doobs	Episode: "My Bodyguard"
2001	Strange Frequency	Derek	Episode: "A Change Will Do You Good"
2001–2002	Da Möb	Rooster (voice)	Main role; 8 episodes
2002	Night Visions	Mark Stevens	Episode: "Cargo / Switch"
2002–2004	The Jamie Kennedy Experiment	Himself / Various characters	62 episodes
2003–2004	King of the Hill	Various characters (voice)	2 episodes
2004	Crank Yankers	Wally Palumbo (voice)	Episode: "#2.23"
2005	Arrested Development	Himself	Episode: "Notapusy"
2006	Mind of Mencia	Will Pillowbiter	Episode: "Stereotype Olympics"
2007	Living with Fran	Alan	Episode: "School Ties"
2007; 2017	Criminal Minds	Floyd Feylinn Ferell	2 episodes
2008	Reaper	Ryan Milner	Episode: "Hungry for Fame"
2008–2010	Ghost Whisperer	Professor Eli James	Main role (season 4–5); 45 episodes
2009–2013	The Cleveland Show	Federline Jones / Various characters (voice)	25 episodes
2009–2014	Fanboy & Chum Chum	Kyle (voice)	Recurring role; 26 episodes
2010	Eureka	Dr. Ramsey	Episode: "The Story of O2"
2011	Scream: The Inside Story	Himself	Documentary film
2012	Entourage	Himself	2 episodes
2013	The Soul Man	Kevin	Episode: "Love Thy Neighbor"
2014	CSI: Crime Scene Investigation	Ed Kapena	Episode: "Long Road Home"
2014	Kingdom	Bucky DeMarco	2 episodes
2015	Star vs. the Forces of Evil	Helios (voice)	Episode: "Freeze Day / Royal Pain"
2016	Interns of F.I.E.L.D.	Black Skull	Episode: "Villains"
2016	Heartbeat	Dr. Callahan	Main role; 8 episodes
2016–2017	Legends of Chamberlain Heights	Dave "Uncle Joey" Couliers / Officer Jaime Kennedy (voice)	Main role; 14 episodes
2017	Lucifer	Andy Kleinburg	Episode: "Stewardess Interruptus"

=== Music videos ===
Year	Title	Artist(s)	Ref.
2012	"Till I Die"	Chris Brown featuring Big Sean and Wiz Khalifa	
2020	"Don't Waste My Time"	Usher featuring Ella Mai	

== Discography ==
- Blowin' Up (2006)

== Awards and nominations ==
Year	Award	Category	Work	Result
1996	Awards Circuit Community Awards	Best Cast Ensemble	Romeo + Juliet	Nominated
1998	Blockbuster Entertainment Awards	Favorite Supporting Actor – Horror	Scream 2	Won
2002	Teen Choice Awards	Choice TV Personality	Jamie Kennedy	Nominated
2003	Teen Choice Awards	Choice TV Personality	Jamie Kennedy	Nominated
2003	Teen Choice Awards	Choice Comedian	Jamie Kennedy	Nominated
2003	Teen Choice Awards	Choice Movie Actor – Comedy	Malibu's Most Wanted	Nominated
2005	Stinkers Bad Movie Awards	Worst Actor	Son of the Mask	Won
2005	Stinkers Bad Movie Awards	Worst Song or Song Performance in a Film or End Credits	Son of the Mask	Nominated
2006	Golden Raspberry Awards	Worst Actor	Son of the Mask	Nominated
2006	Golden Raspberry Awards	Worst Screen Couple	Son of the Mask	Nominated
