= I Like the Way (BodyRockers song) =

2005 single by BodyRockers

Single by BodyRockers

from the album BodyRockers
- Released: 18 April 2005
- Length: 3:20
- Label: Mercury
- Songwriters: Dylan Burns; Kaz James
- Producers: Dylan Burns; Kaz James

BodyRockers singles chronology
"I Like the Way" (2005)	"Round and Round" (2005)

"I Like the Way" is a song by Anglo-Irish DJ Dylan Burns and Australian singer Kaz James, collectively known as BodyRockers. It was released as a single on 18 April 2005 and later appeared on the group's self-titled debut album. The single debuted and peaked at number three on the UK Singles Chart. The song also charted in the United States, peaking at number 20 on the Billboard Dance Club Play chart and reaching number seven on the Billboard Hot Dance Airplay chart. Elsewhere, the single entered the top 10 in New Zealand and Denmark. The song's music video was directed by Trudy Bellinger.

== Track listings ==
Australian maxi-CD single

1. "I Like the Way" (radio edit) – 3:22
2. "I Like the Way" (Junior Jack 'Rock da House' club mix) – 8:10
3. "I Like the Way" (Tom Neville Touch My Body mix) – 7:28
4. "I Like the Way" (Linus Loves mix) – 5:46
5. "I Like the Way" (Bimbo Jones Delano mix) – 6:50
6. "I Like the Way" (full length version) – 6:45

UK CD single

1. "I Like the Way" (radio edit) – 3:22
2. "I Like the Way" (Bimbo Jones Delano edit) – 3:44

UK 12-inch single

A1. "I Like the Way" (full length version) – 6:45
A2. "I Like the Way" (Tom Neville Touch My Body mix) – 7:28
B1. "I Like the Way" (Junior Jack 'Rock da House' club mix) – 8:10
B2. "I Like the Way" (Linus Loves mix) – 5:46

US 12-inch single

A1. "I Like the Way" (full length version) – 6:44
A2. "I Like the Way" (Junior Jack 'Rock da House' dub mix) – 8:10
B1. "I Like the Way" (Bimbo Jones Delano mix) – 6:49
B2. "I Like the Way" (Herd & Fitz remix) – 8:37

== Charts ==
=== Weekly charts ===
Chart (2005–2006)	Peak position
Australia (ARIA)	12
Australian Club Chart (ARIA)	1
Australian Dance (ARIA)	1
Austria (Ö3 Austria Top 40)	17
Belgium (Ultratop 50 Flanders)	33
Czech Republic (IFPI)	30
Denmark (Tracklisten)	8
Europe (Eurochart Hot 100)	12
Finland (Suomen virallinen lista)	14
Germany (GfK)	82
Greece (IFPI)	17
Hungary (Rádiós Top 40)	30
Hungary (Dance Top 40)	2
Ireland (IRMA)	11
Ireland Dance (IRMA)	1
Italy (FIMI)	20
Netherlands (Dutch Top 40)	38
Netherlands (Single Top 100)	51
New Zealand (Recorded Music NZ)	7
Scotland Singles (OCC)	3
UK Singles (OCC)	3
US Dance Club Play (Billboard)	20
US Dance Radio Airplay (Billboard)	7

=== Year-end charts ===
Chart (2005)	Position
Australia (ARIA)	55
Australian Club Chart (ARIA)	2
Australian Dance (ARIA)	6
Europe (Eurochart Hot 100)	98
New Zealand (RIANZ)	32
UK Singles (OCC)	16
US Hot Dance Airplay (Billboard)	38

Chart (2006)	Position
UK Singles (OCC)	167

== Certifications ==
Region	Certification	Certified units/sales
Australia (ARIA)	Gold	35,000^{^}
New Zealand (RMNZ)	Gold	5,000^{*}
United Kingdom (BPI)	Gold	400,000^{‡}
^{*} Sales figures based on certification alone.^{^} Shipments figures based on certification alone.^{‡} Sales+streaming figures based on certification alone.

== Release history ==
Region	Date	Format(s)	Label(s)	Ref.
United Kingdom	18 April 2005	12-inch vinyl; CD	Mercury	
United States	10 April 2006	Contemporary hit radio	Universal	
