= Malibu's Most Wanted =

2003 film directed by John Whitesell

- Theatrical release poster
- Directed by: John Whitesell
- Written by: Fax Bahr; Adam Small; Jamie Kennedy; Nick Swardson
- Produced by: Fax Bahr; Mike Karz; Adam Small
- Starring: Jamie Kennedy; Taye Diggs; Anthony Anderson; Blair Underwood; Regina Hall; Damien Dante Wayans; Ryan O'Neal; Snoop Dogg
- Cinematography: Mark Irwin
- Edited by: Cara Silverman
- Music by: John Van Tongeren with Damon Elliott; John Debney (themes)
- Production company: Karz Entertainment
- Distributed by: Warner Bros. Pictures
- Release date: April 18, 2003
- Running time: 86 minutes
- Country: United States
- Language: English
- Budget: $15 million
- Box office: $34 million

Malibu's Most Wanted is a 2003 American comedy film starring and co-written by Jamie Kennedy and co-starring Taye Diggs, Anthony Anderson, Blair Underwood, Regina Hall, Damien Dante Wayans, Ryan O'Neal, and Snoop Dogg. The film is written by the creators of MADtv, Fax Bahr and Adam Small, who also serve as producers. The character of "B-Rad", a spoof of Eminem's character "B-Rabbit" in the film 8 Mile, originally appeared in Jamie Kennedy's hidden-camera show The Jamie Kennedy Experiment, but started in his stand-up routine when he was starting out.

Here, B-Rad is Brad Gluckman, the son of Senator Bill Gluckman who is running for governor of California and fears his son is a distraction on the campaign trail, with Brad's aspirations of becoming a rapper and his glamorization of gang life. To that end, Gluckman's campaign manager hires two actors to stage an abduction to bring Brad to an inner city neighborhood where he will learn to behave himself. The film was released by Warner Bros. Pictures on April 18, 2003 to mixed to negative reviews from critics, but the film grossed $34 million against a $15 million budget.

== Plot ==
Bill Gluckman is a wealthy Jewish senator from Malibu, California who is running for the office of the governor of California. His son Brad is a wannabe "Eminem", preferring to go by the nickname "B-Rad" despite leading a rich, sheltered life. As a result, members of Mr. Gluckman's political campaign become concerned that Brad's idiotic, outlandish behavior will ruin his father's chances at being elected.

The campaign team members hire two actors, Sean and PJ, who don't know any more about inner-city life than B-Rad, to act as gang members. They kidnap him, and take him to South Los Angeles, where PJ's cousin Shondra lives, and they hope B-Rad will be "scared white" after witnessing what inner city life is really like. The trio engages in mildly dangerous activities such as petty theft in order to convince B-Rad that he should return home.

The three involuntarily become mixed up between rival gangs, unfortunately crossing paths with the leader of one of the gangs, Tec, after bumping into him at a club, and who also happens to be Shondra's ex. In the meantime, B-Rad develops feelings for Shondra, who at first is unimpressed and annoyed, but slowly begins to enjoy B-Rad's company, and eventually admire him for who he truly is.

B-Rad comes to find out that the entire excursion to head to South Central was a ruse in order for him to be scared out of his mannerisms, and soon takes matters into his own hands, turning the tables on his would-be captors. His recklessness leads to the trio becoming actually kidnapped by Tec and his crew, unbeknownst to B-Rad, who just assumes this is part of the act. Tec soon becomes impressed at intimidation tactics portrayed by B-Rad as a result of playing Grand Theft Auto. Unfortunately, during a house party, B-Rad almost gets shot by Tec for a misunderstanding with Shondra. He accidentally shot himself in the foot, yet it barely grazed him due to his poor aim.

When Bill Gluckman realizes that his son is in actual danger, he rushes over, and uses his trademark negotiating skills in order to ease the situation. In doing so, he realizes that he should just accept B-Rad for who he is, and decides that he will support his son unconditionally. The two reconcile, and when the family returns to Malibu, the film closes with Bill and B-Rad celebrating a Gluckman win in the governors' race.

== Cast ==
- Jamie Kennedy as Brad "B-Rad G" Gluckman
- Taye Diggs as Sean "Bloodbath" James
- Anthony Anderson as P.J. "Tree"
- Regina Hall as Shondra
- Blair Underwood as Tom Gibbons
- Damien Dante Wayans as "Tec"
- Ryan O'Neal as Bill Gluckman
- Bo Derek as Bess Gluckman
- Jeffrey Tambor as Dr. Feldman
- Kal Penn as Hadji
- Snoop Dogg as Ronnie Rizzat (voice)
- Nick Swardson as "Mocha"
- Keili Lefkovitz as "Monster"
- Kellie Martin as Jen
- Greg Grunberg as Brett
- J. P. Manoux as Gary
- Terry Crews as "8-Ball"
- Noel Gugliemi as "Snuffy"
- Christa Campbell as Angry Feminist

=== Cameos ===
- Mike Epps as D.J. Johnny Powell
- Felli Fel as "Felli"
- Hi-C as "C"
- Young Dre The Truth as "Dre"
- Drop da Bomb as "Bomb"
- Hal Fishman as Mr. Hal
- Big Boy as Biggs

== Reception ==
On the review aggregator website Rotten Tomatoes, 32% of 92 critics' reviews are positive, with an average rating of 4.70/10. The website's consensus reads: "Malibu's Most Wanted gets a few laughs, but nowhere near enough to sustain its running time." Metacritic, which uses a weighted average, assigned the film a score of 43 out of 100, based on 25 critics, indicating "mixed or average" reviews.

== Cultural themes ==
The overarching themes that are discussed in Malibu's Most Wanted are both the exploitation of one culture by another, as well as the pressure to act within the norms of a given culture. Not only are these themes explored explicitly by the actions of B-Rad, but also by Sean and PJ. There is an expectation of how black people are portrayed in Hollywood that is explored in depth in the manner in which Sean and PJ practice acting "gangsta" in order to prove their blackness. In an interview conducted by Brian Balchack from Movieweb.com, Taye Diggs notes:

the interesting thing, being an African-American actor, is that we're constantly challenged with the duality of acting stereotypically “black,” and just acting. Matt Damon and Ben Affleck don't have to read for a role and ask themselves, ‘Okay, do they want me to say this word like this, or can I just be myself?' I know tons of black actors that didn't grow up in the ‘hood, and don't have their “gangster lingo” down, who take it to another level when they go in for a gangster role. I think that that's very interesting.

== Home media ==
Malibu's Most Wanted was released on VHS and DVD on September 9, 2003.

== See also ==
- Malibu's Most Wanted (soundtrack)
- List of hood films
