= Cynthia Dale =

Canadian actress

- Born: Cynthia Ciurluini; 11 August 1960 (age 66); Toronto, Ontario, Canada
- Education: Michael Power/St. Joseph High School
- Occupation: Actress
- Years active: 1971–present
- Known for: Olivia Novak in Street Legal; Emma Frost in X-Men: The Animated Series
- Spouse: Peter Mansbridge (m. 1998)
- Children: 1
- Relatives: Jennifer Dale (sister)

Cynthia Ciurluini, known professionally as Cynthia Dale, (born 11 August 1960) is a Canadian television actress and stage performer. She is best known for her role as lawyer Olivia Novak in the television drama Street Legal, and Emma Frost in the animated series X-Men.

== Biography ==
Dale was born in Toronto, Ontario, Canada on 11 August 1960 and attended Michael Power/St. Joseph High School. She is the sister of Canadian actress Jennifer Dale and entered the acting world in 1965 after accompanying her sister to an audition. Dale and her sister would appear together in a CBC variety special.

In the 1970s and 1980s, she appeared in a number of movies and stage productions. She appeared as Patty in the 1981 Canadian slasher film, My Bloody Valentine. She appeared in New York City in an off-Broadway play in 1987, and previously in 1983 first appeared at the Stratford Festival, where she has headlined several shows (mostly musicals) in the 2000s. She starred in the 1985 movie Heavenly Bodies, where she played the owner of an aerobics dance studio.

Since 1998, she has been married to CBC News anchor Peter Mansbridge. They have one child, Will.

She was a member of the judging panel of the Canadian television show Triple Sensation in 2007.

She played Helen Bechdel in the Musical Stage Company's Off-Mirvish production of Fun Home at the CAA Theatre from 13 April 2018 to 20 May 2018.

== Filmography ==
=== Film ===
Year	Title	Role	Notes
1981	My Bloody Valentine	Patty	
1983	Snow	Unknown	Short
1984	Heavenly Bodies	Samantha Blair	
1986	The Boy in Blue	Margaret	
1987	Moonstruck	Sheila	
2008	A Broken Life	Carla	

=== Television ===
Year	Title	Role	Notes
1980-1981	The Wayne & Shuster Superspecial	Unknown	2 episodes: "Cyrano de Bergerac"; "The Swan Lake Murders"
1986	The Campbells	Sarah Greener	2 episodes: "Tales of the Canadas"; "Heaven Sent"
1987	Walt Disney's Wonderful World of Color	Elizabeth	Episode: "The Liberators"
1987	Seeing Things	Marlena	Episode, "Eye of the Beholder"
1987	Alfred Hitchcock Presents	Kelly	Episode: "World's Oldest Motive"
1987	Adderly	Lisping Woman	Episode, "Midnight in Morocco"
1987	Sadie and Son	Paula Melvin	TV movie
1987-1988	Night Heat	Allana Pride / Gloria	2 episodes: "Set for Life"; "All the King's Horses"
1988-1994	Street Legal	Olivia Novak	107 episodes
1989	Baby Cakes	Olivia	TV movie
1990	War of the Worlds	Tila	Episode: "The Obelisk"
1992	In the Eyes of a Stranger	Nancy	TV movie
1995	At the Midnight Hour	Jullian	TV movie
1995	Taking the Falls	Terry Lane	13 episodes
1995	Spenser: A Savage Place	Candy Sloane	TV movie
1996	The Newsroom	Herself	Episode: "Petty Tyranny"
1998	Witness to Yesterday	Marie Antoinette	Episode: "Marie Antoinette"
1998	Thanks of a Grateful Nation	Lisa Tuite	TV movie
1999	P.T. Barnum	Charity	TV movie
2001	The Pretender 2001	Agent Andrea Zane	TV movie
2001	The Industry	Susan Doyle	Episode: "Husband & Wife"
2002	Trudeau	Opening Hostess	TV movie
2009	Christmas Dreams	Rose Lunette	TV movie
2010-2011	Baxter	Belinda Nightingale	3 episodes: "Audition Fever"; "Cindy and the Prince of Rock"; "Finale"
2011	The Listener	Diane Feeny	Episode: "Eye of the Storm"
2014	Working the Engels	Lytton Schultz	Episode: "Family Therapy"
2019	Street Legal	Olivia Novak	Rebooted version of 1988–94 series
2022	Coroner	Aunt Vick	2 episodes: "Blast to the Past"; "Death Goes On"
2023	Murdoch Mysteries	Barbara Serrano	Episode: "Murder in F Major"
