= New Zealand top 50 singles of 2000 =

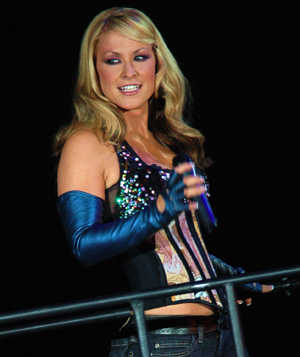
American singer Anastacia released the top performing song of the year, "I'm Outta Love"

This is a list of the top-selling singles in New Zealand for 2000 from the Official New Zealand Music Chart's end-of-year chart, compiled by Recorded Music NZ.

== Chart ==
Key
† – Song of New Zealand origin

Rank	Artist	Song
1	Anastacia	"I'm Outta Love"
2	Mel C	"Never Be The Same Again"
3	Gabrielle	"Rise"
4	Ronan Keating	"Life is a Rollercoaster"
5	Ben Harper	"Steal My Kisses"
6	Lene Marlin	"Sittin' Down Here"
7	The Corrs	"Breathless"
8	Vengaboys	"Shalala lala"
9	Toni Braxton	"He Wasn't Man Enough"
10	Red Hot Chili Peppers	"Otherside"
11	Backstreet Boys	"Show Me the Meaning of Being Lonely"
12	Vanessa Amorosi	"Absolutely Everybody"
13	Morcheeba	"Rome Wasn't Built in a Day"
14	Pink	"There You Go"
15	Robbie Williams	"Win Some Lose Some"
16	Madison Avenue	"Don't Call Me Baby"
17	Mary Mary	"Shackles (Praise You)"
18	All Saints	"Pure Shores"
19	Macy Gray	"I Try"
20	Spiller	"Groovejet (If This Ain't Love)"
21	Robbie Williams	"Rock DJ"
22	Whitney Houston & Enrique Iglesias	"Could I Have This Kiss Forever"
23	Britney Spears	"Oops!... I Did It Again"
24	Kylie Minogue	"Spinning Around"
25	Macy Gray	"Still"
26	NSYNC	"Bye Bye Bye"
27	Sonique	"It Feels So Good"
28	Destiny's Child	"Say My Name"
29	Bomfunk MCs	"Freestyler"
30	Marc Anthony	"You Sang To Me"
31	NSYNC	"It's Gonna Be Me"
32	Christina Aguilera	"What A Girl Wants"
33	Zed	"Renegade Fighter"
34	Zed	"Glorafilia"
35	Britney Spears	"Lucky"
36	stellar*	"Every Girl"
37	Creed	"With Arms Wide Open"
38	3 Doors Down	"Kryptonite"
39	Nine Days	"Absolutely (Story of a Girl)"
40	Backstreet Boys	"The One"
41	Destiny's Child	"Jumpin Jumpin"
42	Lara Fabian	"I Will Love Again"
43	Westlife	"Flying Without Wings"
44	Lonestar	"Amazed"
45	Pink	"Most Girls"
46	Aaliyah	"Try Again"
47	Beth Hart	"LA Song (Out of This Town)"
48	The Feelers	"As Good as it Gets"
49	Madonna	"Music"
50	Ricky Martin	"She Bangs"

== Chart by numbers ==
=== Origin ===
==== By artist ====
The following shows the country of origin from where the artist (including any featured artist where applicable) originate from. Artists who appear more than once have only been tallied once.

Country	Total
United States	22
England	7
Ireland	3
Australia	3
New Zealand	3
Canada	1
Belgium	1
Finland	1
Italy	1
Netherlands	1
Norway	1
Puerto Rico	1
Spain	1

Notes
- Although born in Belgium, Lara Fabian was raised in Canada and as such both countries have been included in her tally.
- Mel C features Lisa Lopes - both England and United States have been tallied.
- Spiller features Sophie Ellis-Bextor - both Italy and England have been tallied.
- Whitney Houston & Enrique Iglesias have been classed as separate entities.

==== By single ====
The following shows the country of origin from which the singles originate regardless of who the artist is.

Country	Total
United States	28
England	8
New Zealand	4
Ireland	3
Australia	3
Belgium	1
Finland	1
Italy	1
Netherlands	1
Norway	1
Puerto Rico	1
Spain	1

=== Most singles ===
Shows the artists with the most singles to appear in this chart. Includes where they appear as a featured artist, however where a singer (e.g. Sophie Ellis-Bextor) appears as a guest singer, this does not count towards their groups tally.

Artist	Total
Backstreet Boys	2
Robbie Williams	2
Macy Gray	2
Britney Spears	2
NSYNC	2
Destiny's Child	2
P!nk	2
Zed	2

=== Format ===
The following shows where each single appears on, whether it was the artists album, a non-album single, an extended play or as part of a soundtrack.

Format	Total
Albums	46
Soundtracks	2
non-album singles	2

Notes
- The song "Pure Shores" appears on the soundtrack for The Beach and the album Saints & Sinners.
- The song "Groovejet (If This Ain't Love)" appears as a non-album single for Spiller and later on the reissue of Read My Lips by Sophie Ellis-Bextor.
- The song "As Good as it Gets" was released as a non-album single in 2000 and later appeared on the album Communicate by The Feelers.
- The song "Try Again" appears on the soundtrack for Romeo Must Die: The Album.

=== Multiple releases ===
The following shows singles that had multiple releases from the same album.

Title	Total	Singles
Millennium (Backstreet Boys)	2	Show Me the Meaning of Being Lonely; The One
On How Life Is (Macy Gray)	2	I Try; Still
No Strings Attached (NSYNC)	2	Bye Bye Bye; It's Gonna Be Me
The Writing's on the Wall (Destiny's Child)	2	Say My Name; Jumpin', Jumpin'
Can't Take Me Home (P!nk)	2	There You Go; Most Girls
Oops!... I Did It Again (Britney Spears)	2	Oops!... I Did It Again; Lucky
Silencer (Zed)	2	Renegade Fighter; Glorafilia

=== Type ===
The following shows the denomination that each single was released as, whether as a solo artist or as part of a group, band or duo. Also shows how many singles had guest artists.

Type	Total
Solo artists	30
Groups	16
Duos	1
Collaborations	1
Featured Artists	2

Notes
- Whitney Houston & Enrique Iglesias have been regarded as a collaboration in this instance.
- Spiller featuring Sophie Ellis-Bextor and Mel C featuring Lisa Lopes have been included in the tally for featured artists.

=== Top Genre ===
The following shows the most common genres the Top 50 singles are regarded as (as per their genre descriptions in the singles entries. Where a genre was not noted, the genre of the album/extended play was used instead. Subgenres have been split as separate entries).

Genre	Total	Singles
Pop	15	Absolutely Everybody (Vanessa Amorosi); Breathless (The Corrs); Don't Call Me Baby (Madison Avenue); Flying Without Wings (Westlife); I Will Love Again (Lara Fabian); Jumpin', Jumpin' - (Destiny's Child); Say My Name (Destiny's Child); She Bangs (Ricky Martin); Show Me the Meaning of Being Lonely (Backstreet Boys); Sittin' Down Here (Lene Marlin); The One (Backstreet Boys); Win Some Lose Some (Robbie Williams); You Sang to Me (Marc Anthony); Every Girl (Stellar*); Renegade Fighter (Zed)
R&B	13	Absolutely (Story of a Girl) - uses album genre fallback Could I Have This Kiss Forever (Whitney Houston & Enrique Iglesias); He Wasn't Man Enough (Toni Braxton); Most Girls (P!nk); Never Be the Same Again (Mel C); Rise (Gabrielle); Say My Name (Destiny's Child); Shackles (Praise You) (Mary Mary); There You Go (P!nk); Try Again (Aaliyah); What a Girl Wants (Christina Aguilera); Jumpin', Jumpin' - (Destiny's Child); Show Me the Meaning of Being Lonely (Backstreet Boys)
Dance-pop	9	Absolutely Everybody (Vanessa Amorosi); Bye Bye Bye (NSYNC); Groovejet (If This Ain't Love) (Spiller); I Will Love Again (Lara Fabian); I'm Outta Love (Anastacia); Music (Madonna); Oops!... I Did It Again (Britney Spears); Rock DJ (Robbie Williams); Spinning Around (Kylie Minogue); The One (Backstreet Boys)
Rock	5	As Good as it Gets (The Feelers); Glorafilia (Zed); LA Song (Out of This Town) (Beth Hart); Renegade Fighter (Zed); Every Girl (Stellar*)
Pop rock	4	Absolutely (Story of a Girl) (Nine Days); Every Girl (Stellar*); LA Song (Out of This Town) (Beth Hart); Life Is a Rollercoaster (Ronan Keating)
Disco	4	Groovejet (If This Ain't Love) (Spiller); I'm Outta Love (Anastacia); Music (Madonna); Spinning Around (Kylie Minogue)
Teen pop	3	Lucky (Britney Spears); Oops!... I Did It Again (Britney Spears); What a Girl Wants (Christina Aguilera)
Alternative rock	2	Otherside (Red Hot Chili Peppers); Absolutely (Story of a Girl) (Nine Days)
Post-grunge	2	Kryptonite (3 Doors Down); With Arms Wide Open (Creed)
House	2	Absolutely Everybody (Vanessa Amorosi); It Feels So Good (Sonique)
Latin pop	3	Could I Have This Kiss Forever (Whitney Houston & Enrique Iglesias); She Bangs (Ricky Martin); Show Me the Meaning of Being Lonely (Backstreet Boys)
Soul	2	I Try (Macy Gray); Still (Macy Gray)
Electropop	2	Music (Madonna); Never Be the Same Again (Mel C)
Neo soul	1	I Try (Macy Gray)
Dream pop	1	Pure Shores (All Saints)
Dance	1	Don't Call Me Baby (Madison Avenue)
Gospel	1	Shackles (Praise You) (Mary Mary)
Trip hop	2	Try Again (Aaliyah); LA Song (Out of This Town) (Beth Hart)
Country pop	1	Amazed (Lonestar)

=== Top Labels ===
The following shows the most common record labels that a single was associated with. Any label that only had one single has not been noted.

Label	Total	Singles
Jive	6	Bye Bye Bye (NSYNC); It's Gonna Be Me (NSYNC); Lucky (Britney Spears); Oops!... I Did It Again (Britney Spears); Show Me the Meaning of Being Lonely (Backstreet Boys); The One (Backstreet Boys)
Columbia	5	I Will Love Again (Lara Fabian); Jumpin', Jumpin' - (Destiny's Child); Say My Name (Destiny's Child); Shackles (Praise You) (Mary Mary); She Bangs (Ricky Martin)
Epic	5	Every Girl (Stellar*); Freestyler (Bomfunk MCs - via Dance Pool/Epic); I Try (Macy Gray); I'm Outta Love (Anastacia); Still (Macy Gray)
Virgin	5	Sittin' Down Here (Lene Marlin); Steal My Kisses (Ben Harper); Try Again (Aaliyah); Never Be the Same Again (Mel C); Don't Call Me Baby (Madison Avenue)
Arista	3	Could I Have This Kiss Forever (Whitney Houston & Enrique Iglesias); Most Girls (P!nk); There You Go (P!nk)
LaFace	3	He Wasn't Man Enough (Toni Braxton); Most Girls (P!nk】); There You Go (P!nk)
Atlantic	3	Breathless (The Corrs); LA Song (Out of This Town) (Beth Hart); Groovejet (If This Ain't Love) (Spiller)
Warner Bros.	2	Music (Madonna); Otherside (Red Hot Chili Peppers)
Universal	2	Glorafilia (Zed); Renegade Fighter (Zed)
RCA	2	Flying Without Wings (Westlife); What a Girl Wants (Christina Aguilera)

=== Top songwriters ===
The following shows the songwriters who had the most top-selling singles of 2000 in New Zealand.

Writer	Total	Singles
Max Martin	5	Show Me the Meaning of Being Lonely (Backstreet Boys); Oops!... I Did It Again (Britney Spears); It's Gonna Be Me (NSYNC); Lucky (Britney Spears); The One (Backstreet Boys)
Rami Yacoub	3	Oops!... I Did It Again (Britney Spears); Lucky (Britney Spears); It's Gonna Be Me (NSYNC)
Andreas Carlsson	2	Bye Bye Bye (NSYNC); It's Gonna Be Me (NSYNC)
Kristian Lundin	2	Bye Bye Bye (NSYNC); Show Me the Meaning of Being Lonely (Backstreet Boys)
Guy Chambers	2	Win Some Lose Some (Robbie Williams); Rock DJ (Robbie Williams)
Robbie Williams	2	Win Some Lose Some (Robbie Williams); Rock DJ (Robbie Williams)
Macy Gray	2	I Try (Macy Gray); Still (Macy Gray)
Jeremy Ruzumna	2	I Try (Macy Gray); Still (Macy Gray)
Beyoncé Knowles	2	Say My Name (Destiny's Child); Jumpin', Jumpin' - (Destiny's Child)
Mark Taylor	2	Could I Have This Kiss Forever (Whitney Houston & Enrique Iglesias); I Will Love Again (Lara Fabian)

=== Most/Least songwriters ===
The following shows the singles that were credited as having been written by only one person and the singles that had the most credited writers of 2000.

Single	Total	Songwriter/s
"Steal My Kisses" (Ben Harper)	1	Ben Harper
"Sittin' Down Here" (Lene Marlin)	1	Lene Marlin
"Every Girl" (Stellar*)	1	Boh Runga
"LA Song (Out of This Town)" (Beth Hart)	1	Beth Hart
"Could I Have This Kiss Forever" (Whitney Houston & Enrique Iglesias)	1	Diane Warren
"Say My Name" (Destiny's Child)	7	Rodney Jerkins; Fred Jerkins III; LaShawn Daniels; Beyoncé Knowles; LeToya Luckett; Kelly Rowland; LaTavia Roberson

=== Top producers ===
The following shows the producers who had the most singles to appear on this chart.

Producer	Total	Singles
Max Martin	5	Show Me the Meaning of Being Lonely (Backstreet Boys); Oops!... I Did It Again (Britney Spears); It's Gonna Be Me (NSYNC); Lucky (Britney Spears); The One (Backstreet Boys)
Kristian Lundin	3	Bye Bye Bye (NSYNC); Show Me the Meaning of Being Lonely (Backstreet Boys); The One (Backstreet Boys)
Guy Chambers	2	Win Some Lose Some (Robbie Williams); Rock DJ (Robbie Williams)
Steve Power	2	Win Some Lose Some (Robbie Williams); Rock DJ (Robbie Williams)
Andrew Slater	2	I Try (Macy Gray); Still (Macy Gray)
Mark Taylor	2	Could I Have This Kiss Forever (Whitney Houston & Enrique Iglesias); I Will Love Again (Lara Fabian)
Rami Yacoub	3	Oops!... I Did It Again (Britney Spears); Lucky (Britney Spears); It's Gonna Be Me (NSYNC)
David Nicholas	2	Glorafilia (Zed); Renegade Fighter (Zed)
