= All It Takes =

2001 single by Stellar*

Single by Stellar*

from the album Magic Line
- B-side: 1. "You"; 2. "Violent" (live)
- Released: 14 September 2001
- Studio: The Lockup (Sydney, Australia); Helen Young (Auckland, New Zealand)
- Length: 3:48
- Label: Epic
- Songwriter(s): Boh Runga; Andrew Maclaren
- Producer(s): Tom Bailey; Stellar*

Stellar* singles chronology
"Every Girl" (2000)	"All It Takes" (2001)	"Taken" (2002)

"All It Takes" is a song by New Zealand band Stellar*, released as the lead single from their second album, Magic Line (2001), in September 2001. The single peaked at number seven on New Zealand's RIANZ Singles Chart and spent 19 weeks in the top 50, becoming the band's longest-charting single. The single includes two B-sides: a differently arranged version of "You" from Stellar*'s debut album, Mix (1999), and a live version of "Violent", recorded live in Hamilton, New Zealand on 4 March 2001.

== Track listing ==
New Zealand CD single

1. "All It Takes"
2. "You"
3. "Violent" (live)

== Credits and personnel ==
Credits are lifted from the New Zealand CD single liner notes.

Studios

- Recorded at The Lockup (Sydney, Australia) and Helen Young Studios (Auckland, New Zealand)
- Mastered at 301 (Sydney, Australia)

Personnel

- Boh Runga – writing
- Andrew Maclaren – writing
- Tom Bailey – production
- Stellar* – production
- Malcolm Welsford – additional production, mixing
- Luke Tomes – engineering
- Don Bartley – mastering

== Charts ==
=== Weekly charts ===
Chart (2001)	Peak position
New Zealand (Recorded Music NZ)	7

=== Year-end charts ===
Chart (2001)	Position
New Zealand (RIANZ)	42
