= Magic 8 =

Single by Atlas

from the album Reasons for Voyaging
- Released: 12 October 2007
- Recorded: 2007
- Genre: Rock
- Length: 4:03
- Label: Elements Music
- Songwriters: Sean Cunningham, Ben Campbell, Elizabeth Jane Ferguson

Atlas singles chronology
"Crawl" (2007)	"Magic 8" (2007)	"Downfall" (2008)

"Magic 8" is the second single from New Zealand rock band Atlas released in 2007. It peaked at No. 27 on the New Zealand singles chart.

Chart (2007)	Peak position
New Zealand RIANZ Singles Chart	27
