= Nathan King (singer-songwriter) =

New Zealand musician

- Origin: Christchurch, New Zealand
- Genres: Pop; rock
- Years active: 1996–present
- Label: Universal / Independent
- Website: https://open.spotify.com/artist/641lw2Fn5GzaI6RLYRE7X5?si=YdkF4D1sT4GTnuFu1WA7-Q

Nathan King is a musician, singer, and songwriter from Christchurch, New Zealand.

== History ==
King's musical career began with his band Zed, who released two multi-platinum albums: Silencer (2000) and This Little Empire (2003). Zed toured in New Zealand, Australia and Europe, playing shows supporting acts like Robbie Williams, Coldplay, The Calling and Ash.

In 2001 he was nominated for the award of best songwriter for "Renegade Fighter" and won the award as best male vocalist at the New Zealand Music Awards.

In 2005 King began a solo career after Zed decided to take an extended break. His first solo album, The Crowd, produced by Brady Blade and Greg Haver, was released in September 2008. It debuted at #22 on the RIANZ New Zealand Album Chart, before reaching a peak of #14.

In 2009 he took part at the 'Classic Hits Church Tour', alongside Greg Johnson, Boh Runga and others.

In 2011 he formed a new group, 'Paper Plane', with his three touring bandmates. Their first single, 'Enemies', was released in September 2011, followed by 'Love Oh Love', and third single 'Yes Ma'am'. Unfortunately one of King's bandmates suffered a broken neck during the filming of the video for 'Yes Ma'am', resulting in the footage being scrapped and a new video concept being developed and produced. Paper Plane disbanded in 2013 after another member was seriously injured in a car accident.

In 2013 he took part in the making of the charity song 'Feel Inside (and Stuff Like That)' for NZ kids charity CureKidsNZ, singing a part alongside other musicians.

In 2014 King formed 'Twin Cities' alongside Andy Lynch (ex. Zed) and the duo released 'Worry No More' as their debut single. The video, featuring the pair rollerskating in a retro-throwback style clip, was filmed over the course of four days in Fiji. Their second single 'Greatest Ever' was released the following year. 'Greatest Ever' was licensed by KFC in an advertising campaign throughout New Zealand over the summer of 2016/17.

In 2019 his band reformed and began performing live shows again after a 15 year hiatus.

In 2021 he became a judge/mentor in the reboot version of Popstars New Zealand.

In 2022 Nathan entered the studio with Zed and began recording their third album, 'Future Memory' which was released on 23rd August, 2024.

== Discography ==
=== Albums ===
Date of Release	Title	Label	NZ
29 September 2008	The Crowd	Hum/Universal	14
28 June 2013	Proof	Hum/Universal	
