= Crawl (Atlas song) =

2007 single by Atlas

Single by Atlas

from the album Reasons for Voyaging
- Released: 2007
- Studio: Roundhead (Auckland, New Zealand)
- Length: 3:51
- Label: Elements Music
- Songwriter: Atlas
- Producers: Hank Lindermann; Ben Campbell

Atlas singles chronology
"Is This Real" (2005)	"Crawl" (2007)	"Magic 8" (2007)

Music video
- "Crawl" on YouTube

"Crawl" is the first commercially available single by New Zealand rock band Atlas, released in 2007 from their debut album, Reasons for Voyaging. It stayed atop New Zealand's RIANZ Singles Chart for seven weeks and was certified platinum for selling over 15,000 copies in New Zealand. A music video directed by Olly Langridge was created for the song. In a 2009 interview with New Zealand news media site Stuff, vocalist Sean Cunningham said, "Believe it or not, when we were writing 'Crawl' we didn't know it was a catchy song."

== Music video ==
A music video directed by Ollie Langridge was made for the song. In the video, a group of people, including Atlas vocalists Sean Cunningham and Beth Campbell, suddenly collapse. As Cunningham and Campbell sing the song, they slowly crawl past all the people, who appear to be incapacitated by a forcefield. Toward the end of the video, the anomaly suddenly disappears, allowing everyone to stand and move again. The video ends when two mysterious men exit a car. New Zealand film and television website NZ on Screen compared the video to The Twilight Zone, referring to it as "moody".

== Track listing ==
New Zealand CD single

1. "Crawl"
2. "Is This Real"
3. "Crawl" (video)
4. "Is This Real" (video)

== Credits and personnel ==
Credits are lifted from the New Zealand CD single liner notes.

Studios

- Recorded and mixed at Roundhead Studios (Auckland, New Zealand)
- Mastered at Sterling Sound (New York City)

Personnel

- Atlas – writing
  - Ben Campbell – production
- Hank Lindermann – production
- Neil Baldock – mixing, engineering
- George Marino – mastering
- Sam Nixon – photography

== Charts ==
=== Weekly charts ===
Chart (2007)	Peak position
New Zealand (Recorded Music NZ)	1

=== Year-end charts ===
Chart (2007)	Position
New Zealand (RIANZ)	6

== Certifications ==
Region	Certification	Certified units/sales
New Zealand (RMNZ)	Platinum	15,000^{*}
^{*} Sales figures based on certification alone.
