= Happy Gun =

Single by Stellar*
- Released: 2 July 1996
- Genre: Grunge
- Length: 2:30
- Label: Papa Pacific
- Songwriters: Boh Runga, Andrew Maclaren, Kurt Shanks
- Producer: Stellar*

Stellar* singles chronology
"Happy Gun" (1996)	"What You Do (Bastard)" (1998)

"Happy Gun" is New Zealand band Stellar*'s first single, and their indies release. Though Chris Van de Geer was not a part of the band at this point he mixed the title track. This indies release sees the band in a completely different genre than what their standard releases are like, featuring a heavy grunge rock arrangement for the first two tracks and an acoustic rock sound for the third. The B-side "Ride" appears in a short film called Headlong by Simon Raby.

== Track listing ==
#	Title	Writer(s)	Duration
1.	"Happy Gun"	Runga, Maclaren, Shanks	2:30
2.	"Ride"	Runga, Maclaren, Haines	3:04
3.	"Reprise"	Runga, Maclaren, Haines	3:05
