= Taken (song) =

2002 single by Stellar*

Single by Stellar*

from the album Magic Line
- B-side: 1. "All It Takes" (remix); 2. "Taken" (acoustic)
- Released: 21 January 2002
- Studio: The Lockup (Sydney, Australia); Helen Young (Auckland, New Zealand)
- Length: 3:27
- Label: Epic
- Songwriter(s): Boh Runga; Andrew Maclaren
- Producer(s): Stellar*; Tom Bailey

Stellar* singles chronology
"All It Takes" (2001)	"Taken" (2002)	"Star" (2002)

"Taken" is a song by New Zealand band Stellar*, released as the second single from their second album, Magic Line (2001), in January 2002. It became the band's last top-10 single in New Zealand, reaching number six. The single includes a dance remix of "All It Takes" by former Nine Inch Nails member Charlie Clouser as well as an acoustic version of the title track, recorded at the now defunct Helen Young Studios in December 2001.

== Background ==
Vocalist Boh Runga said that she liked the song before Jack Joseph Puig mixed it, but after he did, she liked the song even more, calling it "sexy".

== Track listing ==
New Zealand CD single

1. "Taken"
2. "All It Takes" (The Charlie Clouser remix)
3. "Taken" (acoustic)

== Credits and personnel ==
Credits are lifted from the New Zealand CD single liner notes.

Studios

- Recorded at The Lockup (Sydney, Australia) and Helen Young Studios (Auckland, New Zealand)
- Mixed at Ocean Way Studios (Los Angeles)
- Mastered at Gateway Mastering (Portland, Maine, US)

Personnel

- Boh Runga – writing
- Andrew Maclaren – writing
- Stellar* – production
- Tom Bailey – production
- Malcolm Welsford – additional production
- Jack Joseph Puig – mixing
- Luke Tomes – engineering
- Bob Ludwig – mastering

== Charts ==
Chart (2002)	Peak position
New Zealand (Recorded Music NZ)	6
