= What You Do (Bastard) =

Single by Stellar*

from the album Mix
- Released: 27 November 1998
- Genre: Pop rock
- Length: 4:07
- Label: Sony BMG
- Songwriter: Boh Runga
- Producers: Tom Bailey and Stellar*

Stellar* singles chronology
"Happy Gun" (1996)	"What You Do (Bastard)" (1998)	"Part of Me" (1999)

"What You Do (Bastard)" is New Zealand band Stellar*'s second single, and their first single from their debut album Mix. The single includes two remixes of the title track. It reached number 17 on RIANZ.

== Track listing ==
#	Title	Writer(s)	Duration
1.	"What You Do (Bastard)"	Runga, Boh	4:00
2.	"Smooth Bastard"	Runga, Boh	3:53
3.	"Slack Bastard"	Runga, Boh	5:43
