= Star (Stellar song) =

Single by Stellar*

from the album Magic Line
- Released: 27 May 2002
- Length: 4:00
- Label: Epic
- Songwriter(s): Boh Runga
- Producer(s): Tom Bailey, Stellar*

Stellar* singles chronology
"Taken" (2002)	"Star" (2002)	"One More Day" (2003)

"Star" is a song by New Zealand band Stellar*, released as the third single from their second album, Magic Line (2001). The CD single, released on 27 May 2002, was strictly limited. Despite charting for five weeks on the New Zealand Singles Chart, "Star" stalled at number 40, becoming the band's lowest-charting song as well as their final chart appearance. The single includes two B-sides: the Sub Mariner remix of the band's previous single, "Taken", and new track "We Go Out".

== Track listing ==
New Zealand CD single

1. "Star"
2. "Taken"
3. "We Go Out"

== Charts ==
Chart (2002)	Peak position
New Zealand (Recorded Music NZ)	40
