= Reasons for Voyaging =

Studio album by Atlas
- Released: 19 November 2007
- Recorded: July 2006 – October 2007 at Roundhouse studios in Auckland, New Zealand
- Genre: Rock
- Length: 50:06
- Label: Elements Music, Warner Bros. Records
- Producer: David Nicholas and Hank Linderman

Singles from Reasons for Voyaging
- 1. "Is This Real" Released: 2005; 2. "Crawl" Released: 7 March 2007; 3. "Magic 8" Released: 12 October 2007; 4. "Downfall" Released: 2008

Professional ratings
Review scores
Source	Rating
Allmusic	2.5/5 stars

Reasons for Voyaging is the debut album by New Zealand-based rock band Atlas, released on 19 November 2007. The album was recorded with David Nicholas (Pulp, Ash, Elton John and INXS) and produced by Hank Linderman (The Beach Boys, Eagles) at Neil Finn's Roundhead Studios in Auckland.

== Track listing ==
1. "Disillusioned" – 5:16
2. "Is This Real" – 3:46
3. "Crawl" – 3:56
4. "Early Warning" – 5:31
5. "Magic 8" – 4:03
6. "Mr Sorrow" – 4:16
7. "Fragile" – 4:32
8. "Downfall" – 3:38
9. "Saving Grace" – 4:36
10. "Doctor"/"Firefly" – 9:39
11. "Shut" - 4:08 (iTunes bonus track)
12. "Art Of Conversation" - 3:54 (iTunes bonus track)

== Credits ==
- Sean Cunningham – Vocals and Guitar
- Beth Campbell – Vocals
- Ben Campbell – Bass, Keys and BV's
- Andy Lynch - Lead Guitar, Percussion and BV's
- Joe McCallum - Drums and Percussion
- Don Bartle - Mastering
- Neil Baldoc, David Nicholas - Engineer
- Dave Paul - Assistant Engineer
- David Nicholas - Mixer
- Andrew Edgson - Mix Assistant
- Josh Telford - Mix Assistant

== Notes ==
The album is named after a sculpture by New Zealand sculptor Graham Bennett. The sculpture is said to, "Convey a sense of arrival and departure, invitation and challenge, and encourages us to consider to experiences and motivations of all visitors to New Zealand, including Maori and Polynesian voyager, European settlers and recent migrants."
