= Every Girl =

Every Girl may refer to:

- Every Girl (album), by Trisha Yearwood, 2019
- "Every Girl" (Stellar song), 2000
- "Every Girl" (Young Money song), 2009
- "Every Girl", a 2014 song by Allah-Las
