= Undone (Stellar song) =

1999 single by Stellar*

Single by Stellar*

from the album Mix
- B-side: "Violent" (Filthy Lucre mix)
- Released: 22 November 1999
- Studio: Revolver (Auckland, New Zealand)
- Length: 4:21
- Label: Epic
- Songwriter: Boh Runga
- Producers: Tom Bailey; Stellar*

Stellar* singles chronology
"Violent" (1999)	"Undone" (1999)	"Every Girl" (2000)

Audio
- "Undone" on YouTube

"Undone" is a song by New Zealand band Stellar*, released in November 2000 as the fourth single from their debut album, Mix (1999). The single includes the international version of "Violent"'s music video, directed by Jonathan King, as an extra element. "Undone" reached number 13 on New Zealand's RIANZ Singles Chart in January 2000 and charted for 12 weeks.

== Background ==
According to bass player Kurt Shanks, "Undone" was the last song recorded for Mix. Before then, the band had never played the song together, and they tracked their instruments separately. Stellar* debuted the song in July 1999 at Queenstown's Winterfest.

== Track listing ==
New Zealand CD single

1. "Undone"
2. "Undone" (Tapper's Delite mix)
3. "Violent" (Filthy Lucre mix)
4. "Violent" (video—international version)

== Credits and personnel ==
Credits are lifted from the Stellar* website.

Studios

- Recorded at Revolver (Auckland, New Zealand)
- Mixed at Airforce (Auckland, New Zealand)
- Mastered at York Street (Auckland, New Zealand)

Personnel

- Boh Runga – writing
- Tom Bailey – production
- Stellar* – production
- Luke Tomes – programming, mixing, engineering
- Andrew Maclaren – programming
- Glen Cleaver – assistant engineering
- Jonathan King – video directing
- Gavin Botica – mastering

== Charts ==
Chart (2000)	Peak position
New Zealand (Recorded Music NZ)	13
