= Every Girl (Stellar song) =

2000 single by Stellar*

Single by Stellar*

from the album Mix
- B-side: "Pretty Violent Dub Riotous Sound System Clash"; "Smooth Girl"
- Released: 3 April 2000
- Recorded: 1999
- Studio: Revolver (Auckland, New Zealand)
- Length: 3:30
- Label: Epic
- Songwriter(s): Boh Runga
- Producer(s): Tom Bailey; Stellar*

Stellar* singles chronology
| "Undone" (1999) | "Every Girl" (2000) | "All It Takes" (2001) |

Australian cover artwork

"Every Girl" is a song by New Zealand band Stellar*, released as the fifth and final single from their debut album, Mix (1999). It is the band's highest-charting single in their home country, reaching number three on the RIANZ Singles Chart. The single was also released in Australia several months later with a different cover artwork. Track two of the single is billed as "Stellar vs International Observer" and is a dub remix of the band's "Violent" single. The second B-side is a dance remix of "Every Girl" called "Smooth Girl", done by band member Andrew Maclaren.

== Background ==
According to band member Chris Van de Geer, "Every Girl" was recorded after Stellar* finished touring with fellow New Zealand band the Feelers in April 1999, becoming one of the last tracks recorded for Mix.

== Track listing ==
New Zealand and Australian CD single

1. "Every Girl"
2. "Pretty Violent Dub Riotous Sound System Clash"
3. "Smooth Girl"

== Credits and personnel ==
Credits are lifted from the Stellar* website.

Studios

- Recorded at Revolver (Auckland, New Zealand)
- Mixed at Airforce (Auckland, New Zealand)
- Mastered at York Street (Auckland, New Zealand)

Personnel

- Boh Runga – writing
- Tom Bailey – production
- Stellar* – production
- Luke Tomes – programming, mixing, engineering
- Andrew Maclaren – programming
- Glen Cleaver – assistant engineering
- Justin Pemberton – video directing
- Gavin Botica – mastering

== Charts ==
=== Weekly charts ===
| Chart (2000) | Peak position |
|---|---|
| New Zealand (Recorded Music NZ) | 3 |

=== Year-end charts ===
| Chart (2000) | Position |
|---|---|
| New Zealand (RIANZ) | 36 |
