= Part of Me (Stellar song) =

1999 single by Stellar*

Single by Stellar*

from the album Mix
- B-side: "Sorry"; "Trepanning (Out with the Sun)"
- Released: 26 April 1999
- Studio: Revolver (Auckland, New Zealand); Soundtrax
- Length: 4:00
- Label: Epic
- Songwriter(s): Boh Runga
- Producer(s): Tom Bailey; Stellar*

Stellar* singles chronology
"What You Do (Bastard)" (1998)	"Part of Me" (1999)	"Violent" (1999)

"Part of Me" is a song by New Zealand band Stellar*, released as the second single from their debut album, Mix (1999), in April 1999. This song was the group's first top 10 single on New Zealand's RIANZ Singles Chart, spending two weeks at four before dropping out of the top 10. The single includes two B-sides: "Sorry" and "Trepanning (Out with the Sun)".

== Background ==
Stellar* have said that "Part of Me" is their favourite track on Mix despite the fact it was the album's only track not mixed at a professional studio. On 16 June 1999, Christchurch Star writer Chris Mooar gave the song a five-star review, praising the composition and Boh Runga's vocals while calling it "pop music at its most intelligent".

== Track listing ==
New Zealand CD single

1. "Part of Me"
2. "Sorry"
3. "Trepanning (Out with the Sun)"

== Credits and personnel ==
Credits are lifted from the Stellar* website.

Studios

- Recorded at Revolver (Auckland, New Zealand) and Soundtrax Studios
- Mastered at York Street (Auckland, New Zealand)

Personnel

- Boh Runga – writing
- Tom Bailey – production
- Stellar* – production, mixing
- Luke Tomes – mixing, engineering
- Gavin Botica – mastering

== Charts ==
Chart (1999)	Peak position
New Zealand (Recorded Music NZ)	4
