= The Crowd (Nathan King album) =

Studio album by Nathan King
- Released: 29 September 2008
- Genre: Pop
- Length: 45:13
- Label: Hum/Universal
- Producer: Brady Blade

Singles from The Crowd
- 1. ""Never Too Late"" Released: August 2008

The Crowd is the debut solo album from New Zealand singer-songwriter Nathan King. It was produced by Brady Blade and Greg Haver and mixed by Clint Murphy at Roundhead Studios in Auckland. The album was mastered by Andy VanDette at MasterDisk in New York City in 2008.

The album was released in September 2008, and debuted at #22 on the RIANZ New Zealand albums chart, before reaching a peak at #14 the following week.

The lead single, "Never Too Late", debuted at #39 on the RIANZ New Zealand Singles Chart on 20 October 2008. It was successful on New Zealand radio, peaking at #4 on the RIANZ New Zealand Top 10 Radio Airplay Chart.

== Track listing ==
1. "Obvious"
2. "Wake Up"
3. "Never Too Late"
4. "The Saddest Thing"
5. "Not Enough"
6. "The Mystery"
7. "Love Will Lead the Way"
8. "Lines"
9. "Eyes For You"
10. "Goodbye"
11. "Run Away"

== Charts ==
Chart (2008)	Peak position
New Zealand Album Chart	14
