= Why Didn't You Call Me =

2000 single by Macy Gray

Single by Macy Gray

from the album On How Life Is
- B-side: "I've Committed Murder" (remix); "I Can't Wait to Meetchu" (live)
- Released: July 24, 2000
- Studio: Paramount, Sunset Sound, A&M (Hollywood, California)
- Length: 3:14
- Label: Epic; Clean Slate
- Composer: Jeremy Ruzumna
- Lyricist: Macy Gray
- Producer: Andrew Slater

Macy Gray singles chronology
"Still" (2000)	"Why Didn't You Call Me" (2000)	"Sweet Baby" (2001)

Music video
- "Why Didn't You Call Me" on YouTube

"Why Didn't You Call Me" is a song by American singer Macy Gray from her debut studio album, On How Life Is (1999). It was released on July 24, 2000, as the album's fourth and final single.

== Release ==
"Why Didn't You Call Me" became Gray's third consecutive top-40 entry on the UK Singles Chart, peaking at number 38. In the United States, the single reached number 25 on the Adult Top 40 chart and number 29 on the Mainstream Top 40 chart. However, the song missed the Billboard Hot 100, instead peaking at number seven on the Bubbling Under Hot 100 Singles chart.

"Why Didn't You Call Me" was released on two CD formats in the UK. The CD single contains remixes of "Why Didn't You Call Me" and "I've Committed Murder", along with a live recording of "I Can't Wait to Meetchu".

== Music video ==
The music video, which depicts Gray performing in a dimly-lit room and shows close-ups of dancers, received significant play on BET, MTV, and VH1. The video entered the top 10 on VH1's most-played video chart.

== Track listings ==
- UK CD1
1. "Why Didn't You Call Me" – 3:14
2. "I've Committed Murder" (Gang Starr remix featuring Mos Def—clean radio mix) – 4:38
3. "Why Didn't You Call Me" (88-Keys remix) – 3:26
- UK CD2
1. "Why Didn't You Call Me" – 3:14
2. "I Can't Wait to Meetchu" (live at Brixton Academy, London, April 6, 2000) – 8:07
3. "Why Didn't You Call Me" (Black Eyed Peas remix) – 2:56
4. "Why Didn't You Call Me" (video)
- UK cassette single
1. "Why Didn't You Call Me" – 3:14
2. "Why Didn't You Call Me" (Gang Starr remix—clean radio mix) – 3:56
3. "Why Didn't You Call Me" (live at Wembley Arena, London, April 5, 2000) – 3:35
- European CD1
1. "Why Didn't You Call Me" – 3:14
2. "I've Committed Murder" (Gang Starr remix featuring Mos Def—Main Street mix) – 4:37
- European CD2
1. "Why Didn't You Call Me" – 3:14
2. "Why Didn't You Call Me" (Black Eyed Peas remix) – 2:56
3. "Why Didn't You Call Me" (88-Keys remix) – 3:26
4. "Why Didn't You Call Me" (live at Wembley Arena, London, April 5, 2000) – 3:35
5. "I Can't Wait to Meetchu" (live at Brixton Academy, London, April 6, 2000) – 8:07
- Australian CD single
1. "Why Didn't You Call Me" – 3:14
2. "Why Didn't You Call Me" (Black Eyed Peas remix) – 2:56
3. "Why Didn't You Call Me" (live at Wembley Arena, London, April 5, 2000) – 3:35
4. "I Can't Wait to Meetchu" (live at Brixton Academy, London, April 6, 2000) – 8:07
5. "I've Committed Murder" (Gang Starr remix featuring Mos Def—Main Street mix) – 4:37
6. "Why Didn't You Call Me" (video)

== Credits and personnel ==
Credits are lifted from the On How Life Is album booklet.

Studios

- Recorded and mixed at Paramount Studios, Sunset Sound, and A&M Studios (Hollywood, California)

Personnel

- Macy Gray – lyrics, back-up vocals
- Jeremy Ruzumna – music, back-up vocals, piano, organ
- Dawn Beckman – back-up vocals
- Musiic Galloway – back-up vocals
- David Wilder – back-up vocals, bass
- Jinsoo Lim – guitars
- Arik Marshall – guitars
- Matt Chamberlain – drums, percussion
- Darryl Swann – drum programming
- Lenny Castro – percussion
- Andrew Slater – production
- Dave Way – recording, mixing

== Charts ==
=== Weekly charts ===
Chart (2000)	Peak position
Australia (ARIA)	146
Europe (European Radio Top 50)	40
Iceland (Íslenski Listinn Topp 40)	18
New Zealand (Recorded Music NZ)	35
Scotland Singles (OCC)	39
UK Singles (OCC)	38
UK Hip Hop/R&B (OCC)	9
US Bubbling Under Hot 100 (Billboard)	7
US Adult Pop Airplay (Billboard)	25
US Pop Airplay (Billboard)	29

=== Year-end charts ===
Chart (2000)	Position
US Adult Top 40 (Billboard)	77

== Release history ==
Region	Date	Format(s)	Label(s)	Ref(s).
United States	June 26, 2000	Hot adult contemporary; modern adult contemporary radio	Epic	
United States	June 27, 2000	Urban adult contemporary; contemporary hit radio	Epic	
United States	July 11, 2000	Adult contemporary; urban radio	Epic	
United Kingdom	July 24, 2000	CD; cassette	Epic	
