= Magic Line =

Studio album by Stellar*
- Released: 21 October 2001
- Recorded: The Lock Up and Helen Young Studios
- Genre: Pop rock
- Length: 55:00
- Label: Epic
- Producer: Tom Bailey, Stellar*

Stellar* chronology
Mix (1999)	Magic Line (2001)	Something Like Strangers (2006)

Magic Line is the second studio album by New Zealand pop rock band Stellar*, released by Sony BMG on 21 October 2001 in New Zealand.

When the album was released, it hit the #1 position on New Zealand's RIANZ albums charts in its first week. However, unlike its predecessor Mix on the charts it would quickly fall down, staying within the top 10 for only two more weeks.

The album features a re-arranged version of the band's song "Sorry", which appeared on their 1999 single "Part of Me" as a B-side. After four minutes of silence from the end of the album, a special hidden track titled "Everything" plays.

== Track listing ==
#	Title	
1.	"Are You Waiting"	3:50
2.	"All It Takes"	3:48
3.	"Taken"	3:27
4.	"Star"	4:00
5.	"Lightspeed"	3:45
6.	"Imperfect"	3:18
7.	"Crazy"	4:08
8.	"Sorry"	3:41
9.	"Magic Line"	5:13
10.	"If I Could"	3:31
11.	"One More Day"	4:05
12.	"Everything" (Hidden Track)	3:14

== Singles ==
The album featured four singles. The first three also had physical single releases, whereas the last would only have airplay and a music video.

- [2001.09.14] "All It Takes"
- [2002.01.21] "Taken"
- [2002.05.27] "Star"
- [2003.xx.xx] "One More Day"
