= Right Here (Boh Runga album) =

Studio album by Boh Runga
- Released: May 4, 2009
- Recorded: Los Angeles, California
- Genre: Pop rock
- Label: Universal Music NZ
- Producer: Marshall Altman

Boh Runga chronology
Right Here (2009)	Peace of Mind (2013)

Singles from Right Here
- 1. "Starfish Sleeping" Released: 2 December 2008; 2. "Evelyn" Released: 2009

Right Here is the debut solo album of New Zealand singer/songwriter Boh Runga, released in May, 2009. Right Here was recorded in Marshall Altman's Hollywood studio and includes the singles "Starfish Sleeping" and "Evelyn."

The album gained positive reviews in New Zealand. The New Zealand Herald rated the album 4 out of 5 stars, noting “its unashamed blockbuster urges and tunepower make it all the more irresistible” and Real Groove called it “an assured collection of streamlined tunes that’s guaranteed to surf the airwaves.”

== Track listing ==
Track listing and credits adapted from Spotify.

No.	Title	Writer(s)	Length
1.	"Starfish Sleeping"	Boh Runga	3:14
2.	"Evelyn"	Runga; Richard Harris	4:08
3.	"Dark Horse"	Runga; Mike Daly	3:36
4.	"Airwave"	Runga; Jamie Muhoberac	5:25
5.	"Be Careful"	Runga; Jimmy Messer	3:35
6.	"Home"	Runga	3:24
7.	"Names in the Sand"	Runga; Daly	3:23
8.	"The Old Heart"	Runga	4:47
9.	"A Cautionary Tale"	Runga; Marshall Altman	4:25
10.	"The Sky and The Earth"	Runga; Ben West	4:43
11.	"Right Here"	Runga; Pelle Holstrom	3:53

== Charts ==
=== Weekly charts ===
Chart (2009)	Peak position
New Zealand Albums (RMNZ)	33
