= This Little Empire =

Studio album by Zed
- Released: November 11, 2003 (NZ); August 23, 2004 (US)
- Recorded: Radiostar Studios
- Genre: Rock
- Length: 42:42
- Label: Interscope Records; Universal Music Group
- Producer: Sylvia Massy Shivy; Zed; Malcolm Welsford; Martin Kierszenbaum

Zed chronology
Silencer (2000)	This Little Empire (2003)

Alternative cover
- This Little Empire (US edition) artwork

Singles from This Little Empire
- 1. "Starlight" Released: 2002; 2. "Hard to Find Her" Released: 2003; 3. "Don't Worry Baby" Released: 2004; 4. "She Glows" Released: 2004; 5. "Firefly" Released: 2005

This Little Empire is the second studio album by New Zealand rock band Zed. It was produced by Sylvia Massy Shivy and Zed at Radiostar Studios in Weed, California, and engineered by Rich Veltrop and assisted by Josh Kiser. Unlike the band's debut 2000 release, Silencer, This Little Empire was predominantly produced for the American market, with a US edition and a New Zealand edition released. The track listing for the US edition contains tracks taken from their debut album. The album was released to the New Zealand market on November 11, 2003; and released internationally on August 23, 2004, via Interscope Records.

== Chart performance ==
This Little Empire debuted in the Official New Zealand Top 40 Albums chart on November 9, 2003. It spent three weeks within the top ten and peaked at #4. The album spent a total of 13 weeks on the chart.

== Track listing ==
No.	Title	Writer(s)	Producer(s)	Length
1.	"Downtown"	Zed	Sylvia Massy Shivy, Zed	3:11
2.	"Hard to Find Her"	Zed	Sylvia Massy Shivy, Zed, Martin Kierszenbaum	3:03
3.	"Don't Worry Baby"	B. Wilson, R. Christian	Sylvia Massy Shivy, Zed	2:34
4.	"Better On Your Own"	Zed	Sylvia Massy Shivy, Zed	2:22
5.	"Starlight"	R. Cuomo	Zed, Malcolm Welsford	2:53
6.	"Bleeding On the Radio"	Zed	Sylvia Massy Shivy, Zed	3:17
7.	"Baby's Got Me Up"	Zed	Sylvia Massy Shivy, Zed	3:10
8.	"Firefly"	Zed	Sylvia Massy Shivy, Zed	3:16
9.	"Postcard"	Zed, M. Barus	Sylvia Massy Shivy, Zed	4:01
10.	"She Glows"	Zed	Sylvia Massy Shivy, Zed	4:21
11.	"Think It Over"	Zed, C. Brooks	Sylvia Massy Shivy, Zed	4:04
12.	"Did Nobody Tell You"	Zed	Sylvia Massy Shivy, Zed	3:55
13.	"Holding Out"	Zed	Sylvia Massy Shivy, Zed	2:45
Total length:				42:42

US edition
No.	Title	Writer(s)	Producer(s)	Length
1.	"Hard to Find Her"	Zed	Sylvia Massy Shivy, Zed, Martin Kierszenbaum	3:03
2.	"Don't Worry Baby"	B. Wilson, R. Christian	Sylvia Massy Shivy, Zed	2:34
3.	"Renegade Fighter"	N. King, B. Campbell	David Nicholas	3:21
4.	"Better On Your Own"	Zed	Sylvia Massy Shivy, Zed	2:22
5.	"Starlight"	R. Cuomo	Zed, Malcolm Welsford	2:53
6.	"Glorafilia"	B. Campbell, N. King, A. Palmer	David Nicholas	3:20
7.	"Baby's Got Me Up"	Zed	Sylvia Massy Shivy, Zed	3:10
8.	"She Glows"	Zed	Sylvia Massy Shivy, Zed	4:21
9.	"Holding Out"	Zed	Sylvia Massy Shivy, Zed	2:45
10.	"Think It Over"	Zed, C. Brooks	Sylvia Massy Shivy, Zed	4:04
11.	"Bleeding On the Radio"	Zed	Sylvia Massy Shivy, Zed	3:17
12.	"Downtown"	Zed	Sylvia Massy Shivy, Zed	3:11
13.	"Firefly"	Zed	Sylvia Massy Shivy, Zed	3:16
14.	"I'm Cold (2004 album version)"	N. King, B. Campbell	Sylvia Massy Shivy, Zed	3:49
Total length:				45:17

== Personnel ==
Zed

- Nathan King – vocals, guitar
- Ben Campbell – bass, vocals
- Andrew "Andy" Lynch – guitar, vocals, engineering
- Adrian Palmer – drums, percussion

Production

- Sylvia Massy Shivy – producer
- Rich Veltrop – engineering
- Josh Kiser - assistant engineer
- Clint Murphy – additional engineering
- Rivers Cuomo – composer
- Brian Wilson – composer
- Roger Christian – composer
- C. Brooks – composer
- M. Barus – composer
- Clif Norrell – mixing
- Robert Orton – mixing (track 2)
- Martin Kierszenbaum – additional production (track 2)
- Malcolm Welsford – producer, engineering, mixing (track 5)
- George Marino – mastering (track 5)

Additional personnel

- Martin Kierszenbaum – A&R director
- Andrea Ruffalo – A&R co-ordinator
- Robert Hayes – management
- A. Kim Guggenheim – legal representative
- Steve Strange – agent
- Kevin Soh – concept, art direction and design
- Simon Oosterdijk – concept, art direction and design
- Aaron K. – photography
- Karen Inderbitzen-Waller – styling

Credits for This Little Empire adapted from liner notes.

== Certifications ==
Certifications for This Little Empire
Region	Certification	Certified units/sales
New Zealand (RMNZ)	Gold	7,500^{^}
^{^} Shipments figures based on certification alone.
