= Atlas (New Zealand band) =

New Zealand rock band

- Origin: Christchurch, New Zealand
- Genre: Alternative rock
- Years active: 2005–2008
- Label: Elements Music
- Members: Sean Cunningham; Ben Campbell; Andy Lynch; Joe McCallum

Atlas were a New Zealand rock band which was formed in 2005 and disbanded in late 2008.

== Founding ==
In April 2005, in Hollywood, California, producer Hank Linderman (The Beach Boys, Eagles) introduced New Zealand rocker Ben Campbell (a former member of the band Zed) and his sister Beth Campbell (a backing vocalist for the band Chicago), to 19-year-old American solo artist Sean Cunningham. Together with Joe McCallum, the group decided to form the band Atlas.

Located in Auckland, New Zealand, Atlas released their second single "Crawl" in March, 2007, and on 5 March, "Crawl" debuted at #9 before moving up to claim the top spot of the Official New Zealand Music Chart the next week, where it stayed for a total of seven weeks. Their next single was "Magic 8".

Atlas released their debut album Reasons for Voyaging on 19 November 2007, entering the Official New Zealand Music Chart the following week at #4, which was its peak position.

== Discography ==
Date of Release	Title	Label	NZ Chart	Certification
19 November 2007	Reasons for Voyaging	Mental Music	4	NZ: Gold

=== Singles ===
Year	Single	Album	NZ Chart	NZ Certification
2005	"Is This Real"	Reasons for Voyaging	-	-
2007	"Crawl"	Reasons for Voyaging	1	Gold
2007	"Magic 8"	Reasons for Voyaging	27	-
