= Something Like Strangers =

Studio album by Stellar*
- Released: August 28, 2006
- Genre: Pop rock
- Length: 48:53
- Label: Sony BMG
- Producers: Tom Bailey, Stellar*

Stellar* chronology
Magic Line (2001)	Something Like Strangers (2006)

Professional ratings
Review scores
Source	Rating
NZ Herald	mixed Link
XtraMSN	Link

Something Like Strangers is the third studio album by New Zealand Pop rock band Stellar*, released by Sony BMG on August 28, 2006 in New Zealand. The album was released after a period of hiatus after the release of their second album in 2001. Unlike the band's first two albums, Something Like Strangers did not reach the #1 position. It stayed at #9 on the RIANZ albums charts for two weeks before slipping down out of the top 10. The album's lead single was Whiplash, released in March 2006, and followed by the July single For a While (which featured a collaboration with Andy Lovegrove of fellow New Zealand band Breaks Co-Op).

The album was first announced by Boh Runga at the official Stellar* message board in April 2005, with "Take a Girl" (then titled "Take a Girl (Living It Up)") being the prospective first single.

== Track listing ==
#	Title	Writer(s)	Duration
1.	"Beautiful"	Boh Runga, Andrew Maclaren	3:42
2.	"Whiplash"	Boh Runga, Shelly Peiken	3:48
3.	"Miracles"	Boh Runga, Kevin Savigar	4:16
4.	"For a While" (featuring Andy Lovegrove)	Boh Runga	3:00
5.	"What Your Heart Don't Know"	Boh Runga, Kurt Shanks	3:31
6.	"Take a Girl"	Boh Runga, Kurt Shanks, Andrew Maclaren	3:43
7.	"High"	Boh Runga, Kirk Miller	4:01
8.	"Everybody"	Boh Runga, Andrew Maclaren	4:03
9.	"Life"	Boh Runga	3:38
10.	"7 Miles High"	Boh Runga, James Michael	2:53
11.	"Sparkle"	Boh Runga, Andrew Maclaren	4:21

== Singles ==
The album has featured two singles so far. Neither have had physical single releases, only being released through digital and airplay means.

- [2006.03.02] Whiplash
- [2006.07.10] For a While (featuring Andy Lovegrove)
