= Stellar (New Zealand band) =

New Zealand pop rock band (1994–2010)

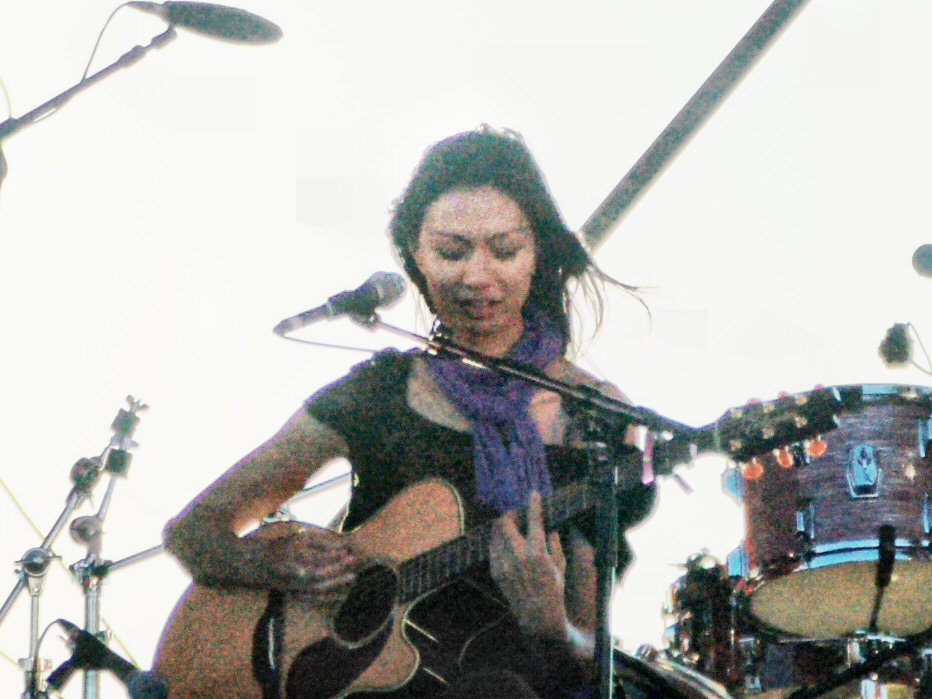

Background information
- Origin: Auckland, New Zealand
- Genres: Pop rock; alternative rock; downtempo; trip hop; electronica
- Years active: 1994–2010, 2017-present
- Label: Sony BMG
- Past members: Boh Runga; Andrew Maclaren; Chris Van de Geer; Kurt Shanks

Stellar (stylised stellar*) is a New Zealand pop rock band led by vocalist Boh Runga.

They have had four RIANZ top 10 singles (the highest being "Every Girl" at No. 3) and two No. 1 albums. The band's signature song is "Violent", which at the 2000 New Zealand Music Awards won the Single of the Year award, as well as winning Runga an award for best Songwriter. The band won seven awards, among them the Best Album award for their debut, Mix. This was followed up by 2001's Magic Line and 2006's Something Like Strangers. The band officially disbanded in 2010 after releasing their greatest hits compilation, and reformed in 2017.

== Formation ==
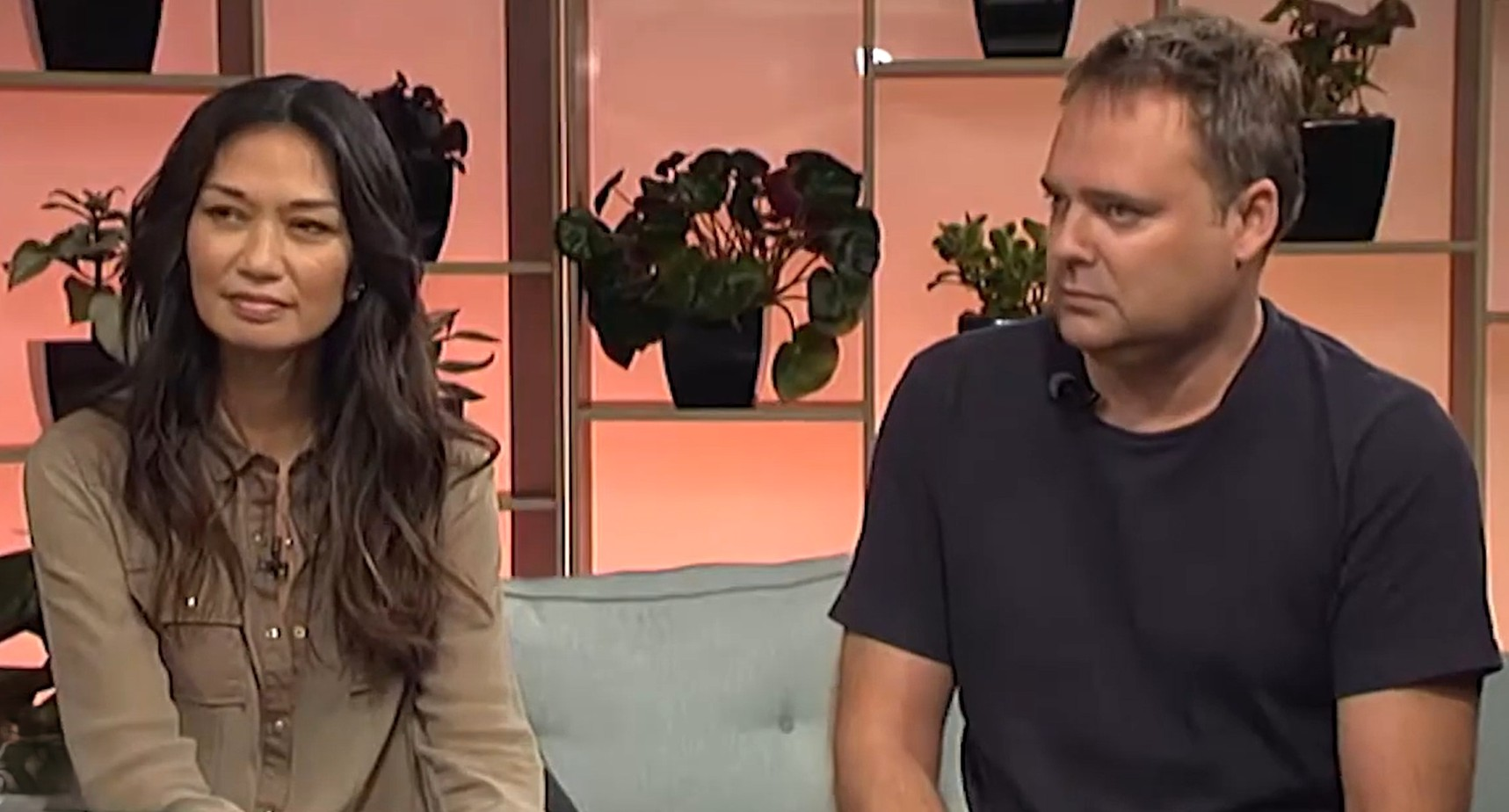
Boh Runga, Kurt Shanks in 2018

In 1992, musicians Boh Runga and Andrew Maclaren moved to Auckland from Christchurch and recorded the single "Ride" with guitarist Joel Haines. The song featured in the short film Headlong by Simon Raby, but the collaboration with Joel Haines did not last. 1994 to 1995 saw Runga and Maclaren recruit guitarist Simon McCormack, followed by bass player Kurt Shanks to form a four-piece, at that time the name Stellar was chosen and the first line up of the band began writing, recording and gigging around Auckland.

Simon McCormack left the band in 1997 and was replaced by a series of guitar players including Derek Solomon before Chris Van de Geer, who had worked as sound engineer on some of the band's demos, took over. In 1998 the band signed on with Sony BMG music NZ. Later that year they released their first commercial single "What You Do (Bastard)". 1999 saw their first album release Mix, then the second-highest selling NZ album ever. The album was produced by ex-Thompson Twins singer Tom Bailey.

Mix would go on to gain Stellar numerous accolades at New Zealand's 2000 Tui awards. It was also released in Australia, and resulted in Stellar being a tour support for Alanis Morissette and Garbage. An extended version of Mix was also released, which featured a CD-ROM of three of their music videos.

In 2001 a follow-up album was released, Magic Line, a far more pop-rock based album than their first. After the release of four singles between 2001 and 2003, the band took an extended break due to different band members' solo projects before reforming.

2006 saw the release of their third album Something Like Strangers, producing the singles "Whiplash" and "For a While", the latter featuring Andy Lovegrove of the band Breaks Co-Op. The band then returned to their solo projects before reuniting for one last time in October 2010 for the release of The Best of Stellar*.

The band reformed in 2017. They played a cover of Sharon O'Neill's 1983 single "Maxine" at the New Zealand Music Awards that same year. Since then, Stellar have been playing in gigs such as the Marlborough Wine and Food Festival in 2019, and the Peachy Keen music festival in 2021.

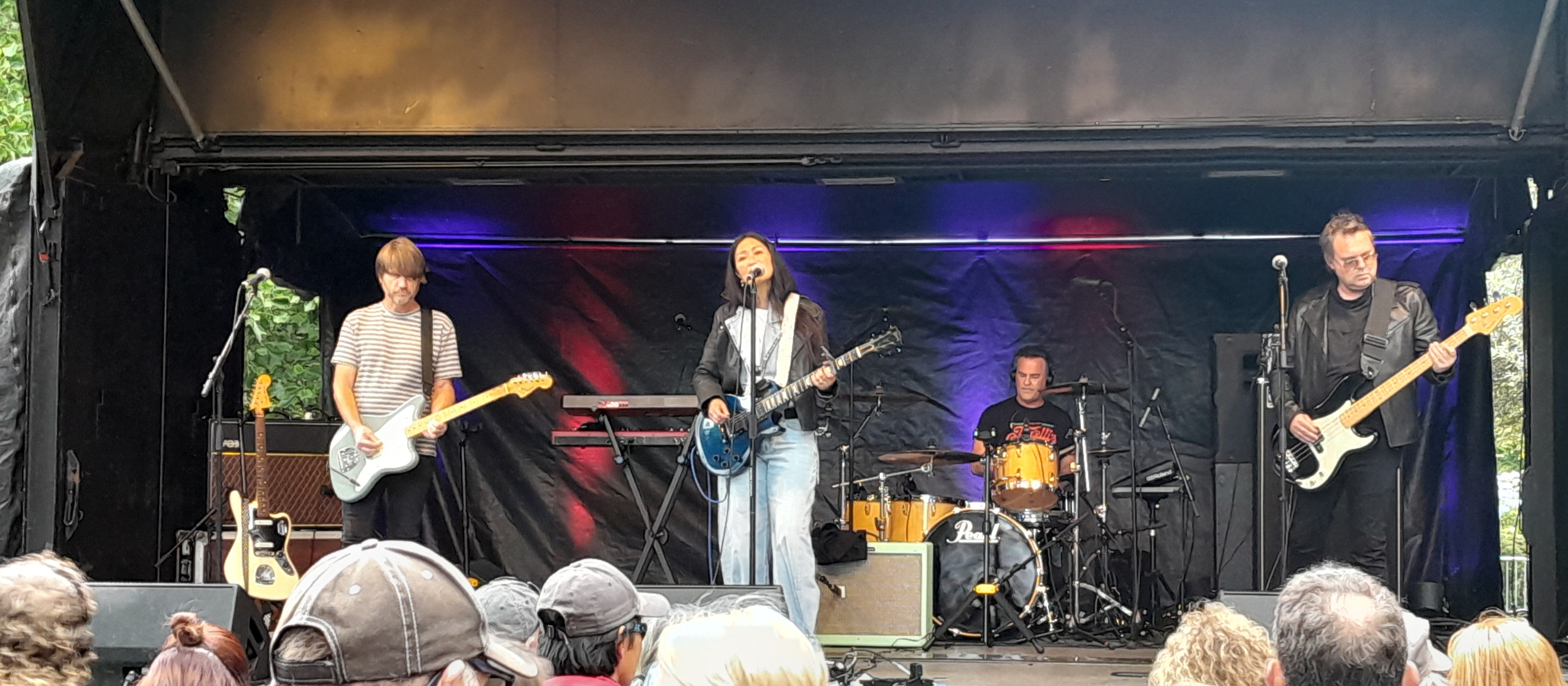
Stellar performing in Christchurch, New Zealand, January 2026

In 2025, the band toured New Zealand, celebrating the 25th anniversary of their album Mix to sold out shows. The show saw the band playing Mix from back to front, as well as encore signature songs such as "All it Takes" and "One More Day".

In November 2026 they received the Top Group Award from the Variety Artists Club of New Zealand.

== Family ==
Boh Runga is the sister of recording artist Bic Runga.

== Discography ==
=== Albums ===
Year	Album	Chart Position	Certification
Year	Album	NZ	Certification
1999	Mix	1	NZ: 5× Platinum
2001	Magic Line	1	NZ: Platinum
2006	Something Like Strangers	9	–

=== Compilations ===
Year	Album	Chart Position	Certification
Year	Album	NZ	Certification
2010	The Best Of Stellar*	26	

=== Singles ===
Year	Single	Chart position	Album
Year	Single	NZ	Album
1996	"Happy Gun"	-	Non-album single
1998	"What You Do (Bastard)"	17	Mix
1999	"Part of Me"	4	Mix
1999	"Violent"	11	Mix
1999	"Undone"	13	Mix
2000	"Every Girl"	3	Mix
2001	"All It Takes"	7	Magic Line
2002	"Taken"	6	Magic Line
2002	"Star"	40	Magic Line
2003	"One More Day"	-	Magic Line
2006	"Whiplash"	-	Something Like Strangers
2006	"For a While" (featuring Andy Lovegrove)	-	Something Like Strangers
2010	"So Alive"	-	The Best Of Stellar*
