= On How Life Is =

Studio album by Macy Gray
- Released: July 1, 1999
- Studios: Paramount (Hollywood); Sunset Sound (Hollywood); A&M (Hollywood)
- Genre: Soul
- Length: 44:55
- Labels: Epic; Clean Slate
- Producer: Andrew Slater

Macy Gray chronology
On How Life Is (1999)	The Id (2001)

Singles from On How Life Is
- 1. "Do Something" Released: June 21, 1999; 2. "I Try" Released: September 27, 1999 (Note: In Japan, "I Try" was released as a double A-side with "Do Something" on July 23, 1999.); 3. "Still" Released: March 13, 2000; 4. "Why Didn't You Call Me" Released: July 24, 2000

On How Life Is is the debut studio album by American singer and songwriter Macy Gray. It was released on July 1, 1999, by Epic Records and Clean Slate. Produced by Andrew Slater, it became Gray's best-selling album to date, selling 3.4 million copies in the United States and seven million copies worldwide.

The album's second single, "I Try", became an international success, topping the charts in Australia, Ireland, and New Zealand, while reaching number five on the US Billboard Hot 100. The song also won a Grammy Award for Best Female Pop Vocal Performance in 2001.

== Critical reception ==
Professional ratings
Review scores
Source	Rating
AllMusic	4/5 stars
Chicago Sun-Times	3.5/4 stars
Robert Christgau	2/3 stars
Entertainment Weekly	B
The Guardian	4/5 stars
The Independent	5/5 stars
Los Angeles Times	3/4 stars
Pitchfork	8.5/10
Q	4/5 stars
Rolling Stone	3/5 stars
The Rolling Stone Album Guide	4/5 stars

On How Life Is was met with highly positive reviews from music critics upon its release, with many praising Gray's songwriting and vocal performance. Q rated the album four out of five stars, calling it a "confident, bluesy soul debut [...] with a lived-in sound – as if Rod Stewart were a girl."

== Track listing ==
All lyrics are written by Macy Gray. All tracks are produced by Andrew Slater.

No.	Title	Music	Length
1.	"Why Didn't You Call Me"	Jeremy Ruzumna	3:14
2.	"Do Something"	Patrick Brown; Raymon Murray; Rico Wade; Cameron Gipp; Thomas Burton; André Benjamin; Antwan Patton; Greg Mays; Darryl Barnes; Ruzumna; Darryl Swann; Robert Barnett; Dion Derek Murdock; George Clinton Jr.; Garry Shider; Bernard Worrell	4:57
3.	"Caligula"	Gray; Swann; Ruzumna	4:38
4.	"I Try"	Gray; Ruzumna; Jinsoo Lim; David Wilder	3:59
5.	"Sex-o-matic Venus Freak"	Ruzumna; Murdock	3:57
6.	"I Can't Wait to Meetchu"	Ruzumna; Swann; Miles Tackett	5:18
7.	"Still"	Ruzumna; Bill Esses	4:15
8.	"I've Committed Murder"	Swann; Kiilu Beckwith; Ruzumna; Eddie Harris; Francis Lai; Carl Sigman	4:59
9.	"A Moment to Myself"	Ruzumna; Tackett; Mark Morales; Damon Yu Wimbley	4:00
10.	"The Letter"	Matt Sherrod; Jamie Houston	5:38

Australian and Japanese edition bonus track
No.	Title	Music	Length
11.	"Rather Hazy"	Gray	3:10

=== Sample credits ===
- "Do Something" contains a sample of "Git Up, Git Out" by OutKast and "Funky for You" by Nice & Smooth.
- "I've Committed Murder" contains a sample of "Live Right Now" by Eddie Harris and an interpolation of "(Where Do I Begin?) Love Story" by Francis Lai & His Orchestra.
- "A Moment to Myself" contains a sample of "Human Beat Box" by The Fat Boys, excerpts of "The Wildstyle" by Time Zone, and a sample of "Entropy (Hip Hop Reconstruction from the Ground Up)" by DJ Shadow & the Groove Robbers.

== Personnel ==
Credits adapted from the liner notes of On How Life Is.

=== Musicians ===
- Macy Gray – lead vocals, vocal arrangements (all tracks); backing vocals (tracks 1, 3–5, 10)
- Dawn Beckman – backing vocals (tracks 1–3, 5–9)
- Musiic Galloway – backing vocals (tracks 1–3, 5–10)
- Jeremy Ruzumna – backing vocals (track 1); organ (tracks 1, 4–6, 8); piano (tracks 1, 7, 10); electric piano, Moog (track 2); Farfisa, clavinet (track 3); Rhodes (tracks 5, 6); Optigan, Chamberlin (track 10)
- David Wilder – backing vocals (track 1); bass (tracks 1, 4)
- Jinsoo Lim – guitar (tracks 1, 2)
- Arik Marshall – guitar (tracks 1, 7–10)
- Lenny Castro – percussion (tracks 1, 2, 7–9)
- Matt Chamberlain – percussion (tracks 1, 3, 9, 10); drums (all tracks)
- Darryl Swann – backing vocals, guitar (track 3); programming (tracks 1–3, 5, 6, 8–10); vocal arrangements (all tracks)
- DJ Kiilu – turntables (tracks 2, 8, 9); programming (track 8)
- Jon Brion – Chamberlin (tracks 2, 3, 8, 10); synths (tracks 3, 8); guitar (tracks 3–6, 8–10); piano (tracks 4, 10); orchestra bells (track 4); vibes (tracks 7, 8); marimba (track 8); Optigan (track 10)
- Patrick Warren – vibes (track 2); Chamberlin (tracks 2–4, 7, 8); synths (track 3); Rhodes, Wurlitzer (track 9)
- Dion Derek Murdock – bass (tracks 2, 6)
- Sy Smith – backing vocals (tracks 3, 5, 7)
- Bendrix Williams – guitar (track 4)
- Rami Jaffee – synths (track 5); piano, Optigan, Chamberlin (track 10)
- Blackbyrd McKnight – guitar (track 5)
- Gabriel Moses – guitar (track 5)
- Steve Baxter – horn (track 6)
- Charlie Green – horn (track 6)
- Michael Harris – horn (track 6)
- Miles Tackett – guitar (track 6)
- Greg Richling – bass (tracks 6–10)
- David Campbell – string arrangement (track 7)
- Jay Joyce – guitar (track 7)
- Ngozi Inyama – sax solo (track 8)

=== Technical ===
- Andrew Slater – production
- Dave Way – recording, mixing
- Darryl "D-Style" Swann – additional engineering
- Howard Willing – first assistant engineer
- Dave Reed – second assistant engineer
- Kevin Dean – second assistant engineer
- Jeff Walch – second assistant engineer
- Michelle Forbes – second assistant engineer
- Sherry Sutcliff – production coordination

=== Artwork ===
- Stéphane Sednaoui – photography
- Hooshik – art direction, design
- Frank Harkins – art direction

== Charts ==
=== Weekly charts ===
Chart (1999–2000)	Peak position
Australian Albums (ARIA)	1
Australian Urban Albums (ARIA)	1
Austrian Albums (Ö3 Austria)	3
Belgian Albums (Ultratop Flanders)	9
Belgian Albums (Ultratop Wallonia)	44
Canada Top Albums/CDs (RPM)	1
Canadian Albums (Billboard)	2
Canadian R&B Albums (Nielsen SoundScan)	1
Czech Albums (ČNS IFPI)	13
Danish Albums (Hitlisten)	1
Dutch Albums (Album Top 100)	28
European Albums (Music & Media)	5
Finnish Albums (Suomen virallinen lista)	16
French Albums (SNEP)	24
German Albums (Offizielle Top 100)	19
Irish Albums (IFPI)	3
Italian Albums (FIMI)	29
Japanese Albums (Oricon)	61
New Zealand Albums (RMNZ)	1
Norwegian Albums (VG-lista)	2
Portuguese Albums (AFP)	9
Scottish Albums (Official Charts)	4
Swedish Albums (Sverigetopplistan)	5
Swiss Albums (Schweizer Hitparade)	6
UK Albums (Official Charts)	3
UK R&B Albums (Official Charts)	1
US Billboard 200	4
US Top R&B/Hip-Hop Albums (Billboard)	9

=== Year-end charts ===
Chart (1999)	Position
European Albums (Music & Media)	95
UK Albums (OCC)	10

Chart (2000)	Position
Australian Albums (ARIA)	7
Austrian Albums (Ö3 Austria)	22
Belgian Albums (Ultratop Flanders)	47
Canadian Albums (Nielsen SoundScan)	12
Danish Albums (Hitlisten)	10
Dutch Albums (Album Top 100)	96
European Albums (Music & Media)	14
German Albums (Offizielle Top 100)	59
New Zealand Albums (RMNZ)	5
Swiss Albums (Schweizer Hitparade)	25
UK Albums (OCC)	28
US Billboard 200	21
US Top R&B/Hip-Hop Albums (Billboard)	32

Chart (2001)	Position
Canadian R&B Albums (Nielsen SoundScan)	63
UK Albums (OCC)	192

=== Decade-end charts ===
Chart (2000–09)	Position
US Billboard 200	129

== Certifications and sales ==
Region	Certification	Certified units/sales
Australia (ARIA)	4× Platinum	280,000^{^}
Austria (IFPI Austria)	Gold	25,000^{*}
Belgium (BRMA)	Gold	25,000^{*}
Canada (Music Canada)	3× Platinum	300,000^{^}
Denmark	—	59,134
Finland (Musiikkituottajat)	Gold	20,496
France (SNEP)	Gold	100,000^{*}
Germany (BVMI)	Gold	250,000^{^}
Netherlands (NVPI)	Gold	50,000^{^}
New Zealand (RMNZ)	4× Platinum	60,000^{^}
Norway (IFPI Norway)	Platinum	50,000^{*}
Sweden (GLF)	Gold	40,000^{^}
Switzerland (IFPI Switzerland)	Platinum	50,000^{^}
United Kingdom (BPI)	4× Platinum	1,200,000^{^}
United States (RIAA)	3× Platinum	3,400,000
Summaries
Europe (IFPI)	2× Platinum	2,000,000^{*}
^{*} Sales figures based on certification alone.^{^} Shipments figures based on certification alone.

== Release history ==
Region	Date	Label	Ref.
Japan	July 1, 1999	Sony	
United States	July 27, 1999	Epic	
