= Silencer (Zed album) =

Studio album by Zed
- Released: 27 August 2000; Early 2001 (bonus disc edition)
- Recorded: Revolver Studios
- Genre: Rock
- Length: 53:59
- Label: Universal Music Group
- Producer: David Nicholas

Zed chronology
Silencer (2000)	This Little Empire (2003)

Alternative cover
- Silencer (bonus disc edition) artwork

Singles from Silencer
- 1. "Oh! Daisy" Released: December 1998; 2. "I'm Cold" Released: July 1999; 3. "Glorafilia" Released: December 1999; 4. "Renegade Fighter" Released: August 2000; 5. "Come On Down" Released: November 2000; 6. "Driver's Side" Released: April 2001

Silencer is the debut studio album by New Zealand rock band Zed. The album was first released in New Zealand on 27 August 2000, via Universal Music Group. The album debuted at number one on the Official New Zealand Top 40 Albums chart, quickly achieving triple platinum status, and creating six hit singles. "Renegade Fighter" was also the number one song in New Zealand for the year 2000. Early in 2001, a bonus disc edition with ten bonus tracks and the music videos for "Renegade Fighter," "Come On Down," and "Driver's Side" was made available.

== Background ==
The album was produced and engineered by David Nicholas at Revolver Studios in Auckland, New Zealand, with final overdubbing and mixing at Mangrove Studios, north of Sydney. Recording sessions were over in seven weeks, but not before all band members and production staff were struck by influenza.

== Singles ==
"Oh! Daisy" was released in December 1998 and debuted at No. 49 on the New Zealand Singles Chart, before peaking at No. 15 in January 1999. Second single "I'm Cold" was released in July 1999 and peaked at No.19. Their third single "Glorafilia" released in December 1999 was the first to peak inside the Top 10, and it spent four non-consecutive weeks inside there, peaking at No. 9. They followed this up with another Top 10 hit, with "Renegade Fighter" released in August 2000 and peaking at No. 4 and spending 8 weeks within the Top 10. This is their highest-peaking single to date. Follow-up single "Come On Down", released in November 2000, continued their string of Top 20 hits, peaking at No. 12; however, the album’s final single, "Driver's Side", peaked at only No. 36.

== Chart performance ==
Silencer debuted in the Official New Zealand Top 40 Albums chart on 27 August 2000 and peaked at number one. The album spent a total of seventeen weeks on the chart in total, with the first nine weeks within the top ten. The album achieved triple platinum status in New Zealand and was the only number one local album for that year.

== Awards ==
In 2001, Silencer earned the band three wins at the New Zealand Music Awards including 'Album of the Year', 'Top Group', and 'Top Male Vocalist'.

== Track listing ==
No.	Title	Writer(s)	Producer(s)	Length
1.	"Renegade Fighter"	Nathan King, Ben Campbell	David Nicholas	3:21
2.	"Driver's Side"	King	Nicholas	3:26
3.	"Come On Down"	King, Campbell	Nicholas	4:07
4.	"He's Sad"	King	Nicholas	4:22
5.	"Glorafilia"	Campbell, King, Adrian Palmer	Nicholas	3:20
6.	"Unseen"	King	Nicholas	4:39
7.	"Oh! Daisy"	Campbell	Nicholas	3:39
8.	"Don't You Wish?"	King	Nicholas	4:58
9.	"In My Mind"	Campbell, King	Nicholas	3:28
10.	"S.P.S."	Campbell	Nicholas	5:14
11.	"I'm Cold"	King, Campbell	Nicholas	3:49
12.	"Good Man"	King, Palmer	Nicholas	3:24
13.	"Calling Again"	Campbell	Nicholas	6:17
Total length:				53:59

Bonus disc edition: bonus tracks (2001)
No.	Title	Writer(s)	Producer(s)	Length
1.	"Unseen (Live)"	King	Chris Tate	5:07
2.	"Driver's Side (Live)"	King	Tate	3:36
3.	"In My Mind (Live)"	Campbell, King	Tate	3:28
4.	"Renegade Fighter (Live)"	King, Campbell	Tate	3:36
5.	"Cavalier"			3:54
6.	"Leaving Me"			2:48
7.	"I'm Cold (Acoustic)"	King, Campbell		3:14
8.	"Glorafilia (Acoustic)"	Campbell, King, Palmer		2:59
9.	"Renegade Fighter (Acoustic)"	King, Campbell		3:20
10.	"Don't You Wish (Trigger X Remix)"	King		5:54

Bonus disc edition: interactive content (2001)
No.	Title	Length
1.	"Renegade Fighter (Video)"
2.	"Come On Down (Video)"
3.	"Driver's Side (Video)"
4.	"On Tour (Video)"

== Personnel ==
- Nathan King – vocals, guitars, composer
- Ben Campbell – bass, keyboards, fx, vocals, composer
- Andrew "Andy" Lynch – guitars, vocals, additional Pro Tools
- Adrian Palmer – drums, percussion, vocals, composer, additional Pro Tools
- David Nicholas – producer, engineering, mixing
- Nic Manders – assistant producer
- Blair Simmons - assistant producer
- Matt Lovell – assistant producer
- Pat Khutz – studio drum technician
- DJ Kritikl – scratching, loop (track 12)
- Don Bartley – mastering
- Grant Kearney – A&R
- Seven.co.nz – design and artwork
- Chris Tate – recording, mixing, editing, mastering (live tracks)
- Tom Muskin – editing, mastering (live tracks)

Credits for Silencer adapted from liner notes.
