= Ben Campbell (musician) =

Ben Campbell is a musician and executive, who was the former bassist for New Zealand alternative rock band Atlas and pop-rock band Zed.

== Music career ==
Ben Campbell's musical career began with his band Zed who released two multi-platinum albums Silencer (2000) and This Little Empire (2003).

Silencer debuted at number one on the Official New Zealand Music Chart, quickly achieving triple platinum status, and creating six hit singles. The single "Renegade Fighter" was also the number-one song in New Zealand for the year 2000.

=== Tours ===
Zed toured and recorded in New Zealand, Australia, America and Europe, playing shows supporting artists like Robbie Williams, Coldplay, Seal, Bon Jovi, The Calling and Ash.

=== Awards ===
Zed received several 2001 New Zealand Music Awards including Album of the Year, Best Group and Best Male Vocalist in 2001.

== Companies ==
In 2002 Ben Campbell established Elements Music Ltd, an independent music label based out of Christchurch, New Zealand, licensed and distributed by Warner Music Ltd. Through Elements, Campbell produced and released Leap of Faith by Robert Lamm, a live album and DVD.

In April 2005 Zed disbanded. In Hollywood, California, producer Hank Linderman (The Beach Boys, Eagles) introduced Campbell to 19-year-old American solo artist Sean Cunningham. Introduced mainly for songwriting collaboration, they decided to form the band Atlas, which Campbell managed and released through his label Elements Music.

"Crawl" was their first commercially available single, released in 2007. It is one of the most successful New Zealand rock songs of the 21st century, staying atop the charts at #1 for nine weeks. It won the New Zealand Music Award for Highest Selling NZ Single. It was featured on their gold selling record Reasons for Voyaging.

After playing shows with Silverchair, Powderfinger and the Stereophonics, Atlas disbanded in 2008.

== Current projects ==
Ben Campbell is currently working on a musical collaboration project with Blindspott guitarist Marcus Powell. He is working from Tandem recording studios in Christchurch producing and developing Christchurch artists and mentoring for the New Zealand Music Commission.

Elements Music has expanded from being a record label to include promotion, management and production.

Campbell is also the co-founder of artist/musician collective/agency Fourwatt.
