= Violent (song) =

1999 single by Stellar*

Single by Stellar*

from the album Mix
- B-side: "California"
- Released: 19 July 1999
- Studio: Revolver (Auckland, New Zealand); Soundtrax
- Genre: Pop rock
- Length: 3:29
- Label: Epic
- Songwriter: Boh Runga
- Producers: Tom Bailey; Stellar*

Stellar* singles chronology
"Part of Me" (1999)	"Violent" (1999)	"Undone" (1999)

Violent is a song by New Zealand pop rock band Stellar*, released as the third single from their debut album, Mix (1999), in July 1999. The single spent six weeks within the top 20 of New Zealand's RIANZ Singles Chart, peaking at number 11, and won the Single of the Year award at the 2000 New Zealand "Tui" Music Awards. The music video to the song depicts the band playing within a small room, amongst other scenes such as one in which Boh Runga plays the role of a nurse in surgery.

== Background ==
According to band member Andrew Maclaren, "Violent" was the song that took Stellar* the longest amount of time to record, as they did not want to finish it until they were all satisfied with the results. A pop rock song, "Violent" was sent to New Zealand radio in late June 1999 and was released as a CD single on 19 July 1999.

== Track listing ==
New Zealand CD single

1. "Violent"
2. "California"
3. "Violent" (Deluded mix)
4. "Violent" (House of DownTown remix)

== Credits and personnel ==
Credits are lifted from the Stellar* website.

Studios

- Recorded at Revolver (Auckland, New Zealand) and Soundtrax Studios
- Mixed at Airforce (Auckland, New Zealand)
- Mastered at York Street Mastering (Auckland, New Zealand)

Personnel

- Boh Runga – writing
- Tom Bailey – production
- Stellar* – production
- Luke Tomes – mixing, engineering
- Gavin Botica – mastering
- Steve Kennedy – mastering

== Charts ==
=== Weekly charts ===
Chart (1999)	Peak position
New Zealand (Recorded Music NZ)	11

=== Year-end charts ===
Chart (1999)	Position
New Zealand (RIANZ)	45
