= Still (Macy Gray song) =

2000 single by Macy Gray

Single by Macy Gray

from the album On How Life Is
- Released: March 13, 2000
- Studio: Paramount, Sunset Sound, A&M (Hollywood, California)
- Length: 4:15
- Label: Epic; Clean Slate
- Composers: Jeremy Ruzumna; Bill Esses; Jeff Blue
- Lyricist: Macy Gray
- Producer: Andrew Slater

Macy Gray singles chronology
| "I Try" (1999) | "Still" (2000) | "Why Didn't You Call Me" (2000) |

Music video
- "Still" on YouTube

"Still" is a song by American singer Macy Gray from her debut studio album, On How Life Is (1999). It was released as the album's third single in the United Kingdom on March 13, 2000, and in the United States on September 26, 2000. The song details a troubled relationship between a woman and a man who is abusive towards her.

"Still" became Gray's second consecutive top-40 single on the UK Singles Chart, peaking at number 18. In the United States, while failing to enter the Billboard Hot 100, the single reached number 32 on the Billboard Adult Top 40 chart. Elsewhere, the song reached number eight in New Zealand and number 12 in Iceland. "Still" was released on two CD formats in the UK that include remixes of both "Still" and "I Try", along with a live version of the latter.

== Track listings ==
- UK CD1
1. "Still" (album version) – 4:15
2. "Still" (X-Ecutioner's remix) – 4:16
3. "I Try" (Jo Whiley Radio 1 Session) – 4:15
4. "Still" (video) – 4:06
- UK CD2
1. "Still" (album version) – 4:15
2. "Still" (Attica Blues mix) – 7:13
3. "I Try" (Grand Style mix) – 4:57
- UK cassette single
1. "Still" (album version) – 4:15
2. "I Try" (Grand Style mix) – 4:57
- European CD1
1. "Still" (album version) – 4:15
2. "I Try" (Jo Whiley Radio 1 Session) – 4:15
- European CD2
1. "Still" (album version) – 4:15
2. "Still" (X-Ecutioner's remix) – 4:16
3. "Still" (Attica Blues mix) – 7:13
4. "I Try" (Jo Whiley Radio 1 Session) – 4:15
- Australian CD1
1. "Still" – 4:15
2. "Still" (X-Ecutioner's remix) – 4:16
3. "Still" (Attica Blues mix) – 7:13
4. "I Try" (Grand Style mix) – 4:57
5. "I Try" (Jo Whiley Radio 1 Session) – 4:15
- Australian CD2
1. "Still" – 4:15
2. "I Try" – 3:59
3. "I Try" (Grand Style mix) – 4:57

== Credits and personnel ==
Credits are lifted from the On How Life Is album booklet.

Studios

- Recorded and mixed at Paramount Studios, Sunset Sound, and A&M Studios (Hollywood, California)

Personnel

- Macy Gray – lyrics
- Jeremy Ruzumna – music, piano
- Bill Esses – music
- Jeff Blue – music
- Dawn Beckman – back-up vocals
- Musiic Galloway – back-up vocals
- Sy Smith – back-up vocals
- Jay Joyce – guitars
- Arik Marshall – guitars
- Greg Richling – bass
- Patrick Warren – Chamberlin
- Matt Chamberlain – drums
- Lenny Castro – percussion
- Jon Brion – vibes
- David Campbell – string arrangements
- Andrew Slater – production
- Dave Way – recording, mixing

== Charts ==
=== Weekly charts ===
| Chart (2000) | Peak position |
|---|---|
| Australia (ARIA) | 21 |
| Belgium (Ultratip Bubbling Under Flanders) | 12 |
| Europe (European Hot 100 Singles) | 65 |
| Germany (GfK) | 92 |
| Iceland (Íslenski Listinn Topp 40) | 12 |
| Ireland (IRMA) | 30 |
| Netherlands (Single Top 100) | 90 |
| New Zealand (Recorded Music NZ) | 8 |
| Scotland Singles (OCC) | 17 |
| UK Singles (OCC) | 18 |
| UK Hip Hop/R&B (OCC) | 3 |
| US Adult Pop Airplay (Billboard) | 32 |

=== Year-end charts ===
| Chart (2000) | Position |
|---|---|
| New Zealand (RIANZ) | 25 |

== Certifications ==
Certifications for "Still"
| Region | Certification | Certified units/sales |
|---|---|---|
| Australia (ARIA) | Gold | 35,000^{^} |
^{^} Shipments figures based on certification alone.

== Release history ==
| Region | Date | Format(s) | Label(s) | Ref. |
|---|---|---|---|---|
| United Kingdom | March 13, 2000 | CD; cassette | Epic | |
| United States | September 26, 2000 | Contemporary hit radio | Epic | |
