= Zed (band) =

New Zealand pop rock band

- Also known as: Supra
- Origin: Christchurch, South Island, New Zealand
- Genre: Rock
- Years active: 1996–2005; 2017; 2019–present
- Label: Universal
- Members: Ben Campbell; Nathan King; Adrian Palmer; Andy Lynch
- Website: zedquarters.com

Zed is a New Zealand rock group, which was formed as Supra in 1996 in Christchurch by Ben Campbell on bass guitar and triangle, Nathan King on lead vocals, guitar and trumpet, and Adrian Palmer on drums and percussion. In 2000 they added a second guitarist, Andrew Lynch. Their debut album, Silencer (2000), peaked at No. 1 on the New Zealand Albums Chart; while their second album, This Little Empire (November 2003), reached No. 3. Their top 10 singles are "Glorafilia" (1999), "Renegade Fighter" (2000), and "Hard to Find Her" (2003). They toured New Zealand, Australia and United States before disbanding in 2004. They have reformed periodically including in 2017, 2019 and 2023.

== History ==
Zed was formed in 1996 as Supra by students at Christchurch's Cashmere High School: Ben Campbell on bass guitar, Nathan King on lead vocals and guitar, and Adrian Palmer on drums. Initially playing cover versions of work by "Crowded House, Supergrass, Blur and Radiohead they started getting together in each other's bedrooms to practice the kind of hook laden pop music they were listening to." Campbell's father contacted talent manager, and former rock-and-roll artist, Ray Columbus. Columbus had them signed to a publishing deal for their original material and booked their early recording sessions. In 2000 they added Andy Lynch (Sensei Master) as second guitarist.

The band worked with producer David Nicholas on their debut album, Silencer (2000). Rhythm and vocal tracks were recorded at Revolver Studios in Auckland, with final overdubbing and mixing at Mangrove Studios, north of Sydney, Australia. Released in New Zealand later that year, Silencer, debuted at No. 1 on the New Zealand Album Charts, and was certified triple platinum. It provided in six top 40 singles with "Renegade Fighter" (2000) peaked at No. 4.

The band's second album, This Little Empire, was released with two different track lists, one for the New Zealand market in 2003, and another aimed at the United States the following year. In total Zed had ten top 40 singles in New Zealand.

Zed disbanded in 2004, they subsequently reunited for a few live gigs (a 2008 performance at Auckland's Vector Arena, and two corporate events in 2011). Nathan King launched a solo career, then later sang with band Paper Planes. Campbell and Lynch formed a new band, Atlas, which disbanded in late 2008. Lynch was working as a session musician in Auckland. In 2017 Zed reunited to perform live. In 2019 they undertook a national tour to celebrate 20 years of Silencer. In 2023, they announced a comeback by releasing a live video of "Renegade Fighter" online. They also released the single "Future You", which was included on their third album, Future Memory, released in August 2024. They toured nationwide in New Zealand in November and December 2023.

In 2026, they toured alongside Iggy Pop, Joan Jett and the Blackhearts, and Hoodoo Gurus for Greenstone Entertainments 2026 Summer Concert Tour.

== Members ==
- Nathan King – vocals, guitar
- Adrian Palmer – drums
- Andy Lynch – guitar
- Ben Campbell – bass, vocals

== Discography ==
=== Albums ===
Title	Details	Peak chart positions
Title	Details	NZ
Silencer	Released: 2000; Re-released: 2001 (with bonus disc); Label: Universal Music NZ; Catalogue: 0140382 (bonus disc edition)	1
This Little Empire	Released: 11 November 2003; Label: Interscope	3
Future Memory	Released: 23 August 2024; Label: August Avenue, Warner	13

=== Singles ===
Year	Title	Peak chart positions		Album
Year	Title	NZ	AUS	Album
1999	"Oh! Daisy"	15	—	Silencer
1999	"I'm Cold"	19	—	Silencer
1999	"Glorafilia"	9	—	Silencer
2000	"Renegade Fighter"	4	82	Silencer
2000	"Come on Down"	12	—	Silencer
2003	"Starlight"	15	—	This Little Empire
2003	"Hard to Find Her"	9	—	This Little Empire
2004	"Don't Worry Baby"	16	—	This Little Empire
2004	"She Glows"	21	—	This Little Empire
2005	"Firefly"	—	—	This Little Empire
2023	"Future You"	— (Note: "Future You" did not enter the NZ Top 40 Singles Chart, but peaked at number 36 on the NZ Hot Singles Chart.)	—	Future Memory
2024	"Into the Ocean"	—	—	Future Memory
2024	"Meant to Be"	—	—	Future Memory
"—" denotes a recording that did not chart or was not released in that territory.
