= Mix (Stellar album) =

Studio album by Stellar
- Released: 29 July 1999
- Genre: Pop rock
- Length: 43:30
- Label: Sony BMG
- Producer: Tom Bailey, Stellar

Stellar chronology
Mix (1999)	Magic Line (2001)

Original Cover
- Original cover from 1999

Professional ratings
Review scores
Source	Rating
New Zealand Herald	5/5 stars

Mix is the debut studio album by New Zealand pop rock band Stellar, released by Sony BMG on 29 July 1999. The album debuted at No. 2 on the RIANZ albums chart, and after seven weeks within the top ten, reached number one. The album was certified 5× platinum, after selling over 75,000 copies in New Zealand.

The album was re-released on 18 February 2000 as a limited edition which included new cover art and a bonus CD-Rom that included the music videos for the singles "Part of Me", "Violent" and "Every Girl", as well as three remixes (these had appeared on previous singles) and an 8-minute documentary. All subsequent pressings of the album also featured the new cover.

Mix was the 22nd best-selling album in 2000 in New Zealand. At the New Zealand Music Awards in 2000, Mix won the Album of the Year award.

== Track listing ==
#	Title	
1.	"Violent"	3:29
2.	"Part of Me"	4:00
3.	"Every Girl"	3:30
4.	"Nerve & Consequences"	3:50
5.	"Undone"	4:21
6.	"Tenderhook"	4:43
7.	"What You Do (Bastard)"	4:07
8.	"If You Lied"	3:23
9.	"Slowburn"	4:25
10.	"Breather"	4:27
11.	"You"	3:15

#	Limited Edition Bonus CD-Rom	
1.	"Violent (Deluded Mix)"	5:23
2.	"Smooth Bastard"	6:09
3.	"Undone (Tapper's Delite Mix)"	3:48

== Singles ==
Five singles were released from the album.

- [1998.11.27] "What You Do (Bastard)"
- [1999.04.26] "Part of Me"
- [1999.07.19] "Violent"
- [1999.11.22] "Undone"
- [2000.04.03] "Every Girl"
