= Boh Runga =

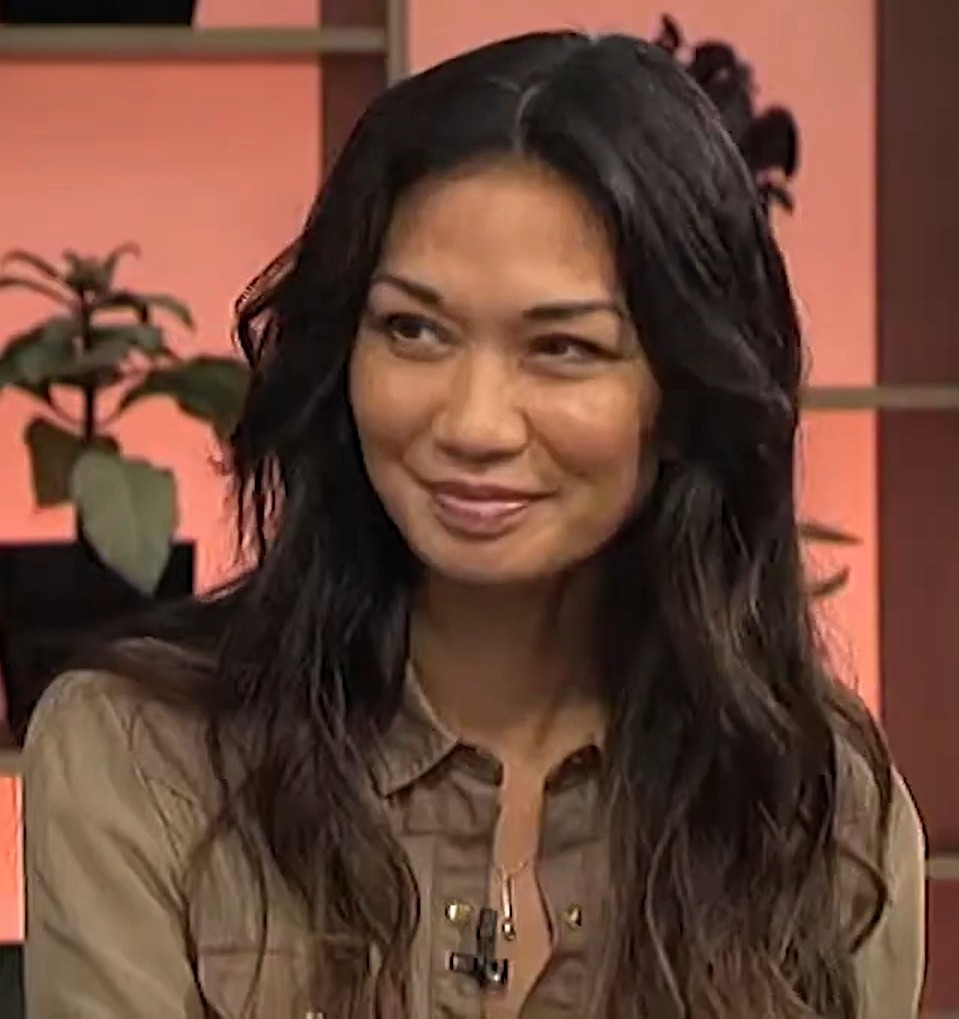
- Runga in 2018

Background information
- Born: Boh Runga; 14 March 1970 (age 56); Christchurch, New Zealand
- Genre: Pop rock
- Occupations: Singer, songwriter
- Years active: 1994–present
- Label: Sony BMG
- Member of: Stellar
- Website: bohrunga.com

Boh Runga (born 14 March 1970) is a New Zealand singer, songwriter and guitarist. She is known as the lead vocalist of Stellar, a New Zealand band pop rock band formed in 1994.

== Early and personal life ==
Runga was born on 14 March 1970 and grew up in Christchurch, New Zealand. She is the daughter of Joseph Te Okoro Runga, a Maori ex-serviceman, and Sophia Tang, a Chinese singer who abandoned her own music career in Malaysia to join Joseph in his home country. Joseph was a self-taught pianist and died in 2005 from a heart attack. Runga is of Ngāti Kahungunu descent. Runga is the older sister of Bic Runga and Pearl Runga who are also musicians.

Runga left Christchurch for Auckland to form Stellar in the late 1990s. After signing with Sony Music, Stellar released their 1999 debut album Mix and quickly became Sony's biggest selling New Zealand band as the album went multi-platinum. Stellar also secured eight Tui Awards for Mix and its 2001 follow up Magic Line.

In 2003, Runga married Campbell Smith, the manager for her sister Bic and chief executive of the Recording Industry Association of New Zealand. She was living in Los Angeles by 2009. The singer has since separated from Smith and returned to her home country, where she lives in Kumeū.

== Early career ==
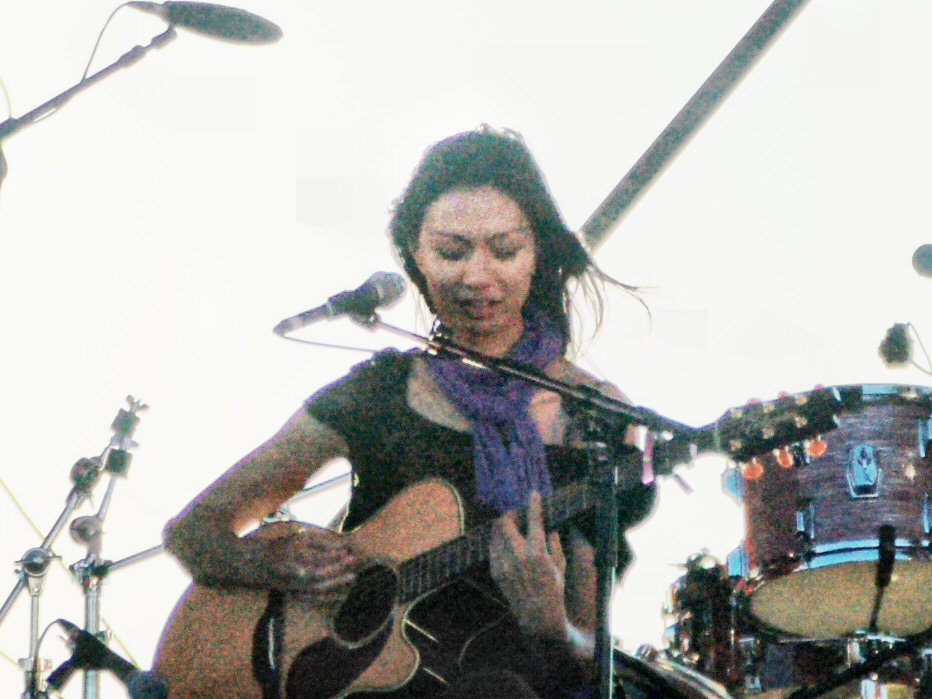
Runga performing live in New Plymouth in 2007 as the opening act for Bic Runga

After the release of 'Magic Line' and the subsequent touring of New Zealand, Australia and Europe, Runga went to Los Angeles in 2003 to hone her skills as a songwriter at the invitation of her LA-based music publishers, Chrysalis. In 2007, a fortuitous introduction to the gold bullion company NZ Mint led Runga into designing and launching her first jewellery range called 'Birdland', based on her love of New Zealand's native birds. Due to the success of both 'Birdland' and her second collection, 'The Messenger Stories', Runga now plans to release the jewellery in Australia and North America.

== Solo career ==
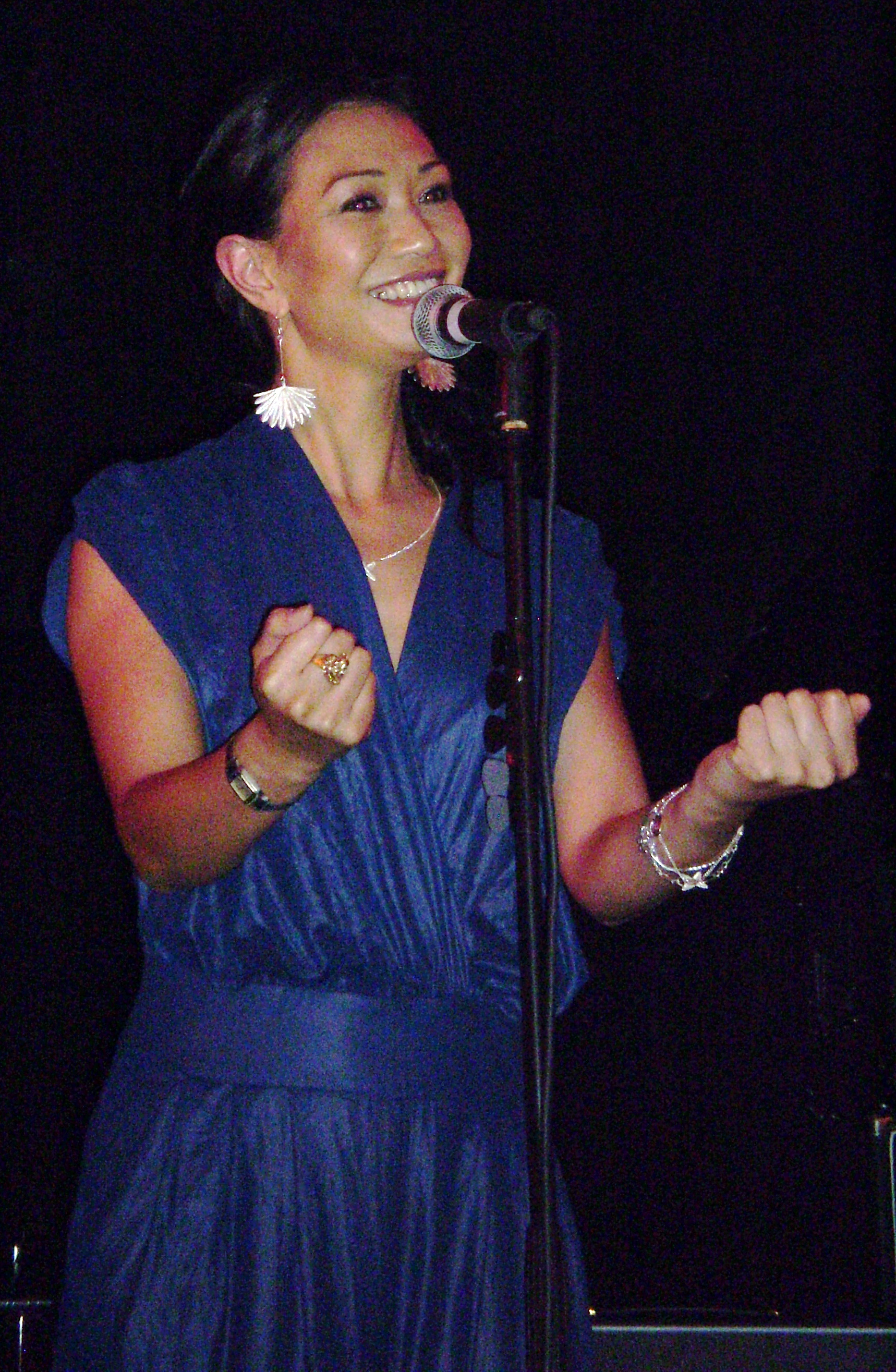
Runga performing in February 2009, at Bar Bodega, Wellington.

Runga's first solo album, Right Here was released on 14 July 2009. Strongly reflective of her time spent in Silver Lake, LA, the album tells tales of love, loss and life. Recorded over six months in the Hollywood studio of producer Marshall Altman, Right Here was warmly received on its recent New Zealand release. The New Zealand Herald gave the album 4 out of 5 stars, noting "its unashamed blockbuster urges and tunepower make it all the more irresistible" and Real Groove called it "an assured collection of streamlined tunes that's guaranteed to surf the airwaves. Collaborators on the album include Serj Tankian (System of a Down), Greg Laswell and writing collaborations with Wendy Melvoin (Prince and the Revolution), Shelly Peiken and Rod Stewart's songwriter Kevin Savigar.

In December 2012, Runga starred in an online video campaign supporting gay marriage, alongside other New Zealand singers Anika Moa and Hollie Smith, as well as Olympian Danyon Loader and former Governor-General Dame Catherine Tizard.

In August 2014, Runga featured with other New Zealand artists on the charity single "Song for Everyone".

== Discography ==
=== Albums ===
- Right Here (2009)

=== Singles ===
Year	Title	Peak chart positions	Album
Year	Title	NZ	Album
2007	"Tears" (Boh & Carly)	—	Non-album single
2008	"Starfish Sleeping"	—	Right Here
2008	"Evelyn"	—	Right Here
2009	"Be Careful"	—	Right Here
2009	"Come Together" (Boh Runga & Che Fu)	—	Right Here special bonus edition
2009	"Names in the Sand"	—	Right Here
2010	"Would You Give Your Heart"	—	Right Here special bonus edition
2011	"Just Talking" (Magik Johnson featuring Boh Runga)	—	Non-album single
2012	"Not Given Lightly" (Various artists)	—	Non-album single
2013	"Shadows" (Dick Johnson, Boh Runga & Tiki Taane)	—	Non-album single
"—" denotes a recording that did not chart or was not released in that territory.

=== Guest appearances ===
Year	Title	Peak chart positions	Notes
Year	Title	NZ	Notes
1994	"Blue Monkey" (Suzanne Paul)	41	Backup singer
2012	"Feel Inside (And Stuff Like That)" (Flight of the Conchords)	1	Charity supergroup
2015	"Team, Ball, Player, Thing" (#KiwisCureBatten)	2	Charity supergroup
"—" denotes a recording that did not chart or was not released in that territory.
