= Hands Down (album) =

Studio album by Bob James
- Released: August 15, 1982
- Recorded: March–June 1982
- Studio: A&R Recording, CBS Studios and Mediasound (New York City, New York); Minot Sound (White Plains, New York)
- Genre: Jazz fusion, smooth jazz, electronic jazz
- Length: 34:51
- Label: Tappan Zee
- Producer: Bob James

Bob James chronology
Sign of the Times (1981)	Hands Down (1982)	Two of a Kind With Earl Klugh (1982)

Hands Down is the tenth studio album by Bob James), released in 1982. This was a turning point in James career, with the tracks "It's Only Me" and "Spunky" being early exponents of electronic jazz. At the time electronica was transforming popular music in reaction to the big orchestrations of the late 1970s (prevalent on James' previous works). The minimalist tastes of the era were also reflected in "Roberta", which mostly featured James in a piano solo.

One track, "Macumba", was a collaboration with songwriter Rod Temperton, held over from James' previous album Sign of the Times.

The track "Shamboozie" is sampled by rapper Rakim on the track "Guess Who's Back" from his 1997 debut solo album The 18th Letter.

== Track listing ==
All songs written by Bob James, unless where noted.

1. "Spunky" - 6:59
2. "Macumba" (Rod Temperton, Bob James) - 5:11
3. "Shamboozie" - 5:17
4. "Janus" - 5:51
5. "Roberta" (Mike Lawrence) - 6:53
6. "It's Only Me" - 5:24

== Personnel ==
- Bob James – Fender Rhodes (1–3), synthesizers (1–4, 6), synth bass (2, 6), drum programming (2, 6), acoustic piano (4–6)
- Steve Khan – guitars (2, 3)
- David Brown – guitars (4)
- Gary King – bass (1, 2, 5)
- Marcus Miller – bass (3)
- Doug Stegmeyer – bass (4)
- Harvey Mason – drums (1, 5)
- John Robinson – drums (2, 3)
- Liberty DeVitto – drums (4)
- Leonard 'Doc' Gibbs Jr. – percussion (1–4)

Brass and Woodwinds

- Rob Zante – lyricon (2)
- Jay Beckenstein – alto saxophone (3)
- Eddie Daniels – woodwinds (2, 3, 5), tenor saxophone (4)
- George Marge – woodwinds (2, 3, 5)
- Wally Kane – woodwinds (2, 3)
- Whit Sidener – woodwinds (2, 3)
- Mark Colby – woodwinds (5)
- Jim Pugh – trombone (2, 3, 5)
- Dave Taylor – trombone (2, 3, 5)
- Wayne Andre – trombone (5)
- Jon Faddis – trumpet (2, 3, 5)
- Mike Lawrence – trumpet (2, 3)
- Ron Tooley – trumpet (2, 3)
- Randy Brecker – trumpet (5)
- John Frosk – trumpet (5)
- Marvin Stamm – trumpet (5)

Strings on "Roberta"

- David Nadien – concertmaster
- Jonathan Abramowitz, Warren Lash, Richard Locker and Charles McCracken – cello
- Lamar Alsop, Alfred Brown and Emanuel Vardi – viola
- Elena Barer, Lewis Eley, Max Ellen, Barry Finclair, Theodore Israel, Marvin Morgenstern, Jan Mullen, John Pintavalle, Matthew Raimondi, Joseph Rubushka, Richard Sortomme and Gerald Tarack – violin

Vocals on "Macumba"

- Patti Austin, Vivian Cherry, Milt Grayson, Yvonne Lewis, Zach Sanders and Luther Vandross
- Rod Temperton – vocal arrangements

=== Production ===
- Bob James – producer, arrangements
- Joe Jorgensen – co-producer, recording, mixing
- Nancy Byers – assistant engineer
- Mark Chusid – assistant engineer
- Chaz Clifton – assistant engineer
- Bruce Robbins – assistant engineer
- Wayne Warnecke – assistant engineer
- Vlado Meller – mastering at CBS Studios (New York, NY)
- Marion Orr – production coordinator
- Paula Scher – art direction, design
- Michael Tannen & Associates – management
