= Heads (Bob James album) =

1977 studio album by Bob James

Studio album by Bob James
- Released: October 14, 1977
- Recorded: May–September 1977
- Studio: Mediasound, New York City; A&R, New York City
- Genre: Jazz fusion, smooth jazz
- Length: 37:57
- Label: Tappan Zee
- Producer: Bob James

Bob James chronology
BJ4 (1976)	Heads (1977)	Touchdown (1978)

Professional ratings
Review scores
Source	Rating
AllMusic	3/5 stars
The Rolling Stone Jazz Record Guide	1/5 stars
The Village Voice	D+

Heads is the fifth album by the jazz musician Bob James, released in October 1977. It was his first album released on his newly formed Tappan Zee label, which was distributed by Columbia Records. All of his Tappan Zee albums (which includes his CTI back-catalog) are distributed by E1 Music. The album reached number one on the Billboard Jazz Albums chart.

== Track listing ==
1. "Heads" (Bob James) – 6:40
2. "We're All Alone" (Boz Scaggs) – 5:33
3. "I'm in You" (Peter Frampton) – 6:48
4. "Night Crawler" (Bob James) – 6:20
5. "You Are So Beautiful" (Billy Preston, Bruce Fisher) – 6:48
6. "One Loving Night" (Henry Purcell) – 5:48

== Personnel ==
- Bob James – arrangements, acoustic piano (1, 2, 5, 6), Fender Rhodes (1–4), clavinet (1, 3), Oberheim Polyphonic synthesizer (1–4), synth bells (1), ARP Odyssey (3), harpsichord (6)
- Ed Walsh – synthesizer programming
- Richard Tee – rhythm keyboards (2)
- Steve Khan – guitars (1, 2, 4, 6)
- Eric Gale – guitars (1, 2, 5, 6) electric guitar (4), guitar solo (5)
- Jeff Layton – guitars (3)
- Jeff Mironov – guitars (3)
- Alphonso Johnson – bass guitar (1, 2)
- Will Lee – bass guitar (3)
- Gary King – bass guitar (4–6)
- Steve Gadd – drums (1, 2)
- Allan Schwartzberg – drums (3)
- Andy Newmark – drums (4–6)
- Ralph MacDonald – percussion
- Mike Mainieri – vibraphone (2)

Brass and woodwinds

- Michael Brecker – soprano saxophone, tenor saxophone
- Phil Bodner – alto saxophone, bass clarinet, flute, oboe
- Eddie Daniels – tenor saxophone, clarinet, flute
- George Marge – baritone saxophone, flute, English horn, oboe, sopranino recorder (6)
- Gerry Niewood – alto saxophone, tenor saxophone, alto flute
- David Sanborn – alto saxophone, alto sax solo (3, 4, 6)
- Grover Washington Jr. – tenor sax solo (6)
- Wayne Andre – trombone
- Tom Mitchell Jr. – trombone
- Dave Taylor – trombone
- Randy Brecker – flugelhorn, trumpet
- Jon Faddis – flugelhorn, trumpet
- John Frosk – flugelhorn, trumpet
- Lew Soloff – flugelhorn, trumpet
- Marvin Stamm – flugelhorn, trumpet
- James Buffington – French horn
- Peter Gordon – French horn
- Brooks Tillotson – French horn

Strings

- Jonathan Abramowitz – cello
- Charles McCracken – cello
- Alan Shulman – cello
- Gloria Agostini – harp
- Lamar Alsop – viola
- Al Brown – viola
- Emanuel Vardi – viola
- Harry Cykman – violin
- Max Ellen – violin
- Barry Finclair – violin
- Paul Gershman – violin
- Diana Halprin – violin
- Harold Kohon – violin
- Marvin Morgenstern – violin
- David Nadien – violin, concertmaster
- John Pintavalle – violin
- Max Pollikoff – violin
- Matthew Raimondi – violin

Vocals on "You Are So Beautiful"

- Patti Austin
- Vivian Cherry
- Lani Groves
- Gwen Guthrie

=== Production ===
- Bob James – producer
- Joe Jorgensen – associate producer, engineer, mixing
- Jay Borden – assistant engineer
- Michael Braver – assistant engineer
- Doug Epstein – assistant engineer
- John Berg – art direction, design
- Paula Scher – art direction, design
- Buddy Endress – photography

== Charts ==
Chart (1978)	Peak position
Billboard Top LPs	47
Billboard Top Jazz LPs	1
