= Windjammer (album) =

Studio album by Freddie Hubbard
- Released: 1976
- Recorded: 1976
- Studios: Mediasound, New York City; Columbia 52nd Street, New York City
- Genre: Jazz
- Length: 34:18
- Label: Columbia
- Producer: Bob James

Freddie Hubbard chronology
Liquid Love (1975)	Windjammer (1976)	Bundle of Joy (1977)

Windjammer is an album recorded in 1976 by jazz trumpeter Freddie Hubbard. It was released on the Columbia label and features performances by Hubbard, Jon Faddis, Michael Brecker, Bob James, George Cables Steve Khan and Eric Gale.

== Critical reception ==
Professional ratings
Review scores
Source	Rating
AllMusic	1/5 stars
The Rolling Stone Jazz Record Guide	1/5 stars

Scott Yanow of AllMusic calls Windjammer "probably Freddie Hubbard's worst recording" and lambasts the music as dated and shallow.

== Track listing ==
All compositions by Freddie Hubbard except as indicated

1. "Dream Weaver" (Gary Wright) – 5:26
2. "Feelings" (Loulou Gasté, Morris Albert) – 5:56
3. "Rock Me Arms" (Ralph MacDonald, William Salter, Zachary Sanders, Fareil Glenn) – 5:51
4. "Touch Me Baby" (Bob James) – 7:05
5. "Neo Terra (New Land)" – 5:01
6. "Windjammer" – 4:59

- Recorded at Mediasound and Columbia Studio B, New York City

== Personnel ==
- Freddie Hubbard – trumpet
- Jon Faddis: trumpet
- Michael Brecker: tenor saxophone
- Bob James: piano, clavinet, synthesizer
- George Cables: electric piano, clavinet
- Hubert Laws: flute
- Steve Khan: guitar
- Richie Resnicoff: guitar
- David Spinozza: guitar
- Eric Gale: guitar
- Jerry Friedman: guitar

- Gary King: bass
- Steve Gadd: drums
- Andy Newmark: drums
- Chris Parker: drums
- Ralph MacDonald: percussion
- Ray Mantilla: percussion
- Marvin Stamm: trumpet
- Bernie Glow: trumpet
- Lew Soloff: trumpet
- Wayne Andre: trombone
- Dave Taylor: trombone
- Alan Raph: trombone
- George Marge: oboe, alto saxophone, English horn
- Wally Kane: bassoon
- Phil Bodner: alto saxophone
- Max Ellen: violin
- David Nadien: violin
- Emanuel "Manny" Green: violin
- Harry Cykman: violin
- Charles Libove: violin
- Harry Lookofsky: violin
- Max Pollikoff: violin
- Paul Gershman: violin
- Matthew Raimondi: violin
- Richard Sortomme: violin
- Alfred Brown: viola
- Emanuel Vardi: viola
- Charles McCracken: cello
- Jesse Levy: cello
- Patti Austin: vocals
- Vivian Cherry: vocals
- Gwen Guthrie: vocals
- Zack Sanders: vocals
- Frank Floyd: vocals

== Charts ==
Weekly chart performance for Windjammer
Chart (1976)	Peak position
US Billboard 200	85
US Top R&B/Hip-Hop Albums (Billboard)	17
