= H (Bob James album) =

Studio album by Bob James
- Released: 1980
- Recorded: 1980
- Studio: Mediasound and Sound Mixers (New York, NY)
- Genre: Jazz fusion, smooth jazz
- Length: 38:34
- Label: Tappan Zee
- Producer: Bob James

Bob James chronology
One on One (1979)	H (1980)	All Around the Town (1981)

Professional ratings
Review scores
Source	Rating
AllMusic	3.5/5 stars

H is the eighth album by jazz keyboardist Bob James.

== Track listing ==
All tracks composed by Bob James except as noted.

1. "Snowbird Fantasy" - 7:03
2. "Shepherd's Song" - 6:40
3. "Brighton by the Sea" - 5:36
4. "The Walkman" - 6:19
5. "Thoroughbred" - 7:22
6. "Reunited" (Dino Fekaris, Freddie Perren) - 5:42

== Personnel ==
- Bob James – acoustic piano, Fender Rhodes, Oberheim Polyphonic synthesizer, arrangements and conductor
- Hiram Bullock – electric guitar, vocals (4)
- Bruce Dunlap – acoustic guitar solo (1), acoustic guitar (6)
- David Brown – acoustic guitar solo (2), acoustic guitar (5)
- Gary King – bass (1, 3, 4, 6)
- Doug Stegmeyer – bass (2, 5)
- Buddy Williams – drums (1, 3, 4, 6)
- Liberty DeVitto – drums (2, 5)
- Airto Moreira – percussion (1, 6)
- Leonard "Doc" Gibbs – percussion (4)
- Ralph MacDonald – percussion (5)

Brass and Woodwinds

- Grover Washington, Jr. – soprano saxophone, tin whistle
- Phil Bodner, Eddie Daniels, Jerry Dodgion, George Marge and Romeo Penque – woodwinds
- Paul Faulise, Jim Pugh and Barry Rogers – trombone
- Randy Brecker, Danny Cahn, Jon Faddis and Mike Lawrence – trumpet

Strings

- David Nadien – concertmaster
- Jonathan Abramowitz and Charles McCracken – cello
- Lamar Aslop and Al Brown – viola
- Lewis Eley, Max Ellen, Barry Finclair, Regis Iandiorio, Marvin Morgenstern, Jan Mullen and Matthew Raimandi – violin

=== Production ===
- Bob James – producer
- Joe Jorgensen – associate producer, engineer
- Mark Chusid – assistant engineer
- Brian McGee – assistant engineer
- Vlado Meller – mastering at CBS Mastering Studios (New York, NY)
- Marion Orr – production coordinator
- Paula Scher – art direction, design
- Buddy Endress – photography
- Jim Houghton – inside photography

== Charts ==
Chart (1980)	Peak position
Billboard Top Pop Albums	47
Billboard Top Jazz Albums	3
