= Touchdown (Bob James album) =

Studio album by Bob James
- Released: July 20, 1978
- Recorded: 1978
- Studio: CBS Studios, Sound Mixers and A&R Recording (New York City, New York)
- Genre: Jazz fusion, smooth jazz
- Length: 33:42
- Label: Tappan Zee; Columbia
- Producer: Bob James

Bob James chronology
Heads (1977)	Touchdown (1978)	Lucky Seven (1979)

Touchdown is the sixth album by Bob James, released in 1978 on his Tappan Zee label through Columbia Records.

The album's title is a reference to this being James' sixth solo album (a touchdown being worth six points in American football), a pattern also followed by his previous album Heads (featuring a five cent coin on its cover) and next album Lucky Seven.

== Taxi ==
Professional ratings
Review scores
Source	Rating
AllMusic	3/5 stars
The Rolling Stone Jazz Record Guide	1/5 stars

Touchdown contains the song "Angela", the popular theme to the 1970s television sitcom Taxi. The song was named after a guest character in the third episode of the first season ("Blind Date"), but after hearing the song, the producers made this the show's main theme, replacing their previous choice, which became this album's title track.

== Track listing ==
All songs written by Bob James

1. "Angela (Theme from Taxi)" – 5:48
2. "Touchdown" – 5:44
3. "I Want to Thank You (Very Much)" – 7:07
4. "Sun Runner" – 6:17
5. "Caribbean Nights" – 8:46

== Personnel ==
- Bob James – acoustic piano, Yamaha electric grand piano, Fender Rhodes, Oberheim Polyphonic synthesizer, arrangements and conductor
- Eric Gale – guitar solo (1), electric guitar (2, 5)
- Hiram Bullock – electric guitar (2–5), guitar solo (5), vocal solo (5)
- Earl Klugh – acoustic guitar (3–5)
- Richard Resnicoff – acoustic rhythm guitar (3)
- Gary King – electric bass (1, 2)
- Ron Carter – acoustic bass (3–5), piccolo bass solo (5)
- Idris Muhammad – drums (1)
- Steve Gadd – drums (2–5)
- Ralph MacDonald – percussion (1–4)
- Mongo Santamaria – percussion (5)

Brass and Woodwinds

- Phil Bodner – alto saxophone, flute, oboe
- Jerry Dodgion – alto saxophone, flute
- David Sanborn – alto saxophone solo (2)
- Howard Johnson – baritone saxophone, contrabass clarinet
- Harvey Estrin – tenor saxophone, clarinet, flute
- George Marge – tenor saxophone, English horn, flute, oboe, recorder
- Hubert Laws – flute solo (3–5)
- Wayne Andre – trombone
- Dave Bargeron – trombone
- Alan Raph – trombone
- Randy Brecker – trumpet
- Jon Faddis – trumpet
- Mike Lawrence – trumpet
- Ron Tooley – trumpet

Strings

- David Nadien – concertmaster
- Jonathan Abramowitz, Seymour Barab, Richard Locker and Charles McCracken – cello
- Jean Dane, Theodore Israel, Sue Pray and Emanuel Vardi – viola
- Harry Cykman, Lewis Eley, Max Ellen, Louis Gabowitz, Diana Halprin, Harold Kohon, Harry Lookofsky, John Pintavalle, Matthew Raimondi, Herbert Sorkin and Richard Sortomme – violin

=== Production ===
- Bob James – producer
- Jay Chattaway – associate producer
- Joe Jorgensen – associate producer, engineer
- Tim Bomba – assistant engineer
- Ted Bronson – assistant engineer
- Lou Jannone – assistant engineer
- Harold Tarowsky – assistant engineer
- Vlado Meller – mastering at Columbia Mastering (New York, NY)
- Marion Orr – production coordinator
- Paula Scher – art direction, design
- Buddy Endress – photography

== Charts ==
Chart (1978)	Peak position
Billboard Pop Albums	37
Billboard Top Jazz Albums	1
