= BJ4 =

Studio album by Bob James
- Released: February 24, 1977
- Recorded: November–December 1976
- Studio: Van Gelder Studio, Englewood Cliffs, New Jersey
- Genre: Jazz fusion, smooth jazz
- Length: 36:20
- Label: CTI
- Producer: Creed Taylor

Bob James chronology
Three (1976)	BJ4 (1977)	Heads (1977)

Professional ratings
Review scores
Source	Rating
Allmusic	3/5 stars
The Rolling Stone Jazz Record Guide	1/5 stars

BJ4 is the fourth solo album by jazz pianist Bob James. Released in 1977, the album charted at number three on the Jazz Album Charts. This would be his last CTI album before starting his label Tappan Zee Records, named for one of the tracks on this album.

== Track listing ==
All tracks composed by Bob James; except where noted.

1. "Pure Imagination" (Leslie Bricusse, Anthony Newley) – 5:20
2. "Where the Wind Blows Free" – 6:43
3. "Tappan Zee" – 6:49
4. "Nights Are Forever Without You" (Parker McGee) – 6:23
5. "Treasure Island" – 6:10
6. "El Verano" – 4:55

== Personnel ==
- Bob James – acoustic piano, Fender Rhodes, clavinet, ARP Odyssey, Oberheim polyphonic synthesizer, arrangements
- Eric Gale – guitars
- Gary King – bass
- Steve Gadd – drums
- Ralph MacDonald – percussion

Brass and Woodwinds

- Eddie Daniels – tenor saxophone, clarinet, flute
- Romeo Penque – tenor saxophone, bass clarinet, tenor recorder
- Hubert Laws – flute, alto flute
- George Marge – alto recorder
- Sidney Weinberg – oboe, English horn
- Art Farmer – trumpet, flugelhorn
- John Frosk – trumpet
- John Gatchell – trumpet

Strings

- Charles McCracken – cello
- Alan Shulman – cello
- Lamar Alsop – viola
- Emanuel Vardi – viola
- Max Ellen – violin
- Paul Gershman – violin
- Harry Glickman – violin
- Emanuel Green – violin
- Harold Kohon – violin
- Charles Libove – violin
- David Nadien – violin
- Matthew Raimondi – violin

=== Production ===
- Creed Taylor – producer
- Rudy Van Gelder – engineer
- Sib Chalawick – album design
- Carole Kowalchuck – album design
- Wendie Lombardi – cover photography
- White Gate Art Company – liner photography

== Charts ==
Chart (1977)	Peak position
Billboard Pop Albums	38
Billboard Top Soul Albums	33
Billboard Top Jazz Albums	3
