= Three (Bob James album) =

Studio album by Bob James
- Released: September 3, 1976
- Recorded: November 1975 & January 1976
- Studios: Van Gelder, Englewood Cliffs, New Jersey
- Genres: Jazz fusion, smooth jazz
- Length: 36:46
- Label: CTI
- Producer: Creed Taylor

Bob James chronology
Two (1975)	Three (1976)	BJ4 (1977)

Three is the third solo album by jazz musician Bob James.

== Reception ==
Professional ratings
Review scores
Source	Rating
AllMusic	3/5 stars
The Rolling Stone Jazz Record Guide	2/5 stars

Released in 1976, the album charted at number two on the Billboard Jazz Album charts.

== Track listing ==
1. "One Mint Julep" (Rudy Toombs) – 9:09
2. "Women of Ireland" (Seán Ó Riada) – 8:07
3. "Westchester Lady" (Bob James) – 7:29
4. "Storm King" (Bob James) – 6:37
5. "Jamaica Farewell" (Lord Burgess) – 5:24
6. "Look Look" (Bob James) – 4:48 *

* Japanese bonus track only.

== Personnel ==
- Bob James – keyboards, arrangements and conductor
- Jeff Mironov – guitars (1)
- Eric Gale – guitar solo (2), guitars (3–5)
- Hugh McCracken – guitars (2–5)
- Gary King – bass guitar (1, 2, 5)
- Will Lee – bass guitar (3, 4)
- Andy Newmark – drums (1)
- Harvey Mason – drums (2–5)
- Ralph MacDonald – percussion

Brass and woodwinds

- Eddie Daniels – alto saxophone, tenor saxophone, flute
- Grover Washington Jr. – soprano saxophone, tenor saxophone, tin whistle
- Jerry Dodgion – flute
- Hubert Laws – flute
- Wayne Andre – trombone
- Dave Bargeron – bass trombone, tuba
- Dave Taylor – bass trombone
- Jon Faddis – trumpet
- John Frosk – trumpet
- Lew Soloff – trumpet
- Marvin Stamm – trumpet

Strings

- Charles McCracken – cello
- Alan Shulman – cello
- Gloria Agostini – harp
- Al Brown – viola
- Emanuel Vardi – viola
- Frederick Buldrini – violin
- Harry Cykman – violin
- Lewis Eley – violin
- Max Ellen – violin
- Emanuel Green – violin
- Harold Kohon – violin
- David Nadien – violin
- Matthew Raimondi – violin

Production

- Creed Taylor – producer
- Rudy Van Gelder – engineer
- Rene Schumacher – album design
- Richard Alcorn – photography

== Charts ==
Chart (1976)	Peak position
Billboard Pop Albums	49
Billboard Top Soul Albums	23
Billboard Top Jazz Albums	2
