= Two (Bob James album) =

Studio album by Bob James
- Released: May 29, 1975
- Recorded: December 1974 & January 1975
- Studios: Van Gelder, Englewood Cliffs, New Jersey
- Genres: Jazz fusion, smooth jazz
- Length: 38:23
- Label: CTI
- Producer: Creed Taylor

Bob James chronology
One (1974)	Two (1975)	Three (1976)

Two is the second solo album by jazz keyboardist Bob James.

== Reception ==
Professional ratings
Review scores
Source	Rating
AllMusic	3/5 stars

The album is the second of a series of jazz-funk classics (along with One, Three and BJ4). Released in 1975, the album charted at number two on the Jazz Album Charts. The track "Take Me to the Mardi Gras" is one of the most widely used tracks in hip-hop breakbeat samples.

== Track listing ==
1. "Take Me to the Mardi Gras" (Paul Simon) – 5:50
2. "I Feel a Song (In My Heart)" (Tony Camillo, Mary Sawyer) – 5:26
3. "The Golden Apple" (Bob James) – 7:20
4. "Farandole" (Georges Bizet) – 8:24
5. "You're as Right as Rain" (Thom Bell, Linda Creed) – 5:28
6. "Dream Journey" (Bob James) – 5:55

== Personnel ==
- Bob James – electric piano, clavinet, ARP Odyssey, Yamaha YC-30 combo organ, arrangements and conductor
- Eric Gale – guitars (1, 2, 4), bass (1, 2, 4–6)
- Richard Resnicoff – guitars (3, 5)
- Gary King – bass (3)
- Andrew Smith – drums (1, 2, 4–6)
- Steve Gadd – drums (3)
- Arthur Jenkins – percussion
- Ralph MacDonald – percussion
- Patti Austin – vocals, lead vocal (2)
- Frank Floyd – vocals
- Lani Groves – vocals
- Zachary Sanders – vocals

Brass and woodwinds

- Hubert Laws – flute (4), electric flute (4)
- Eddie Daniels – clarinet
- James Buffington, Peter Gordon and Al Richmond – French horn
- Wayne Andre, Eddie Bert, Tom Mitchell and Tony Studd – trombone
- Randy Brecker, Victor Paz, Lew Soloff and Marvin Stamm – trumpet, flugelhorn

Strings

- Seymour Barab, Alla Goldberg, Warren Lash, Jesse Levy, George Ricci, Alan Shulman and Anthony Sophos – cello
- Harry Cykman, Max Ellen, Paul Gershman, Harry Glickman, Emanuel Green, Harold Kohon, Charles Libove, Harry Lookofsky, Joe Malin, David Nadien, Gene Orloff and Matthew Raimondi – violin

Production

- Creed Taylor – producer
- Rudy Van Gelder – engineer
- Bob Ciano – album design
- Greg Laurents – cover photography

== Samples ==
- Many artists sampled the drums and bell part of the intro to the track "Take Me to the Mardi Gras", an instrumental cover of the Paul Simon song. It has since become a widely recognized drum break, similar to another break from another instrumental, "Ashley's Roachclip".
- The melody of "You're as Right as Rain" was sampled by Norwegian electronic music duo Röyksopp for their 2001 single "Eple" (whose title means "apple" in Norwegian, in reference to Two's album cover).

== Charts ==
Chart (1975)	Peak position
Billboard Pop Albums	75
Billboard Top Soul Albums	28
Billboard Top Jazz Albums	2
