= Lucky Seven (Bob James album) =

Studio album by Bob James
- Released: August 1979
- Recorded: 1979
- Studios: A&R, Mediasound, Sound Mixers, and The Power Station (New York City, New York)
- Genre: Jazz fusion
- Length: 34:51
- Label: Tappan Zee
- Producer: Bob James

Bob James chronology
| Touchdown (1978) | Lucky Seven (1979) | One on One (1979) |

Lucky Seven is the seventh album by jazz keyboardist Bob James, released in 1979. It peaked at No. 42 on the Billboard 200.

== Critical reception ==
Professional ratings
Review scores
| Source | Rating |
|---|---|
| AllMusic | 2/5 stars |
| The Columbian | 2/4 stars |
| The Rolling Stone Jazz Record Guide | 1/5 stars |

The Columbian called Lucky Seven "a lackluster effort when compared to his earlier CTI albums." The Morning Call considered it to be the work of "a group of sophisticated musicians playing a mild, but interesting, brand of jazz fusion."

== Track listing ==
All songs are written by Bob James except where noted.

1. "Rush Hour" – 6:39
2. "Blue Lick" – 5:31
3. "Look-Alike" – 5:30
4. "Big Stone City" – 5:42
5. "Friends" (Neil Jason, Kash Monet, Jeff Schoen) – 4:41
6. "Fly Away" – 6:44

== Personnel ==
- Bob James – acoustic piano, Fender Rhodes, Oberheim Polyphonic synthesizer, arrangements and conductor
- Hiram Bullock – electric guitar (1, 4–6)
- Eric Gale – electric guitar (2, 3)
- Steve Khan – acoustic guitar (3)
- Richard Resnicoff – acoustic guitar (5, 6)
- Neil Jason – bass (1, 2, 4, 5)
- Gary King – bass (3, 6)
- Steve Gadd – drums (1, 2)
- Andy Newmark – drums (3)
- Idris Muhammad – drums (4–6)
- Jimmy Maelen – percussion (1, 2, 4–6)
- Ralph MacDonald – percussion (3)

Brass and woodwinds

- Michael Brecker – saxophone solo (4)
- David Sanborn – saxophone
- George Marge – woodwinds
- Wayne Andre – trombone
- Dave Taylor – trombone
- Randy Brecker – trumpet
- Jon Faddis – trumpet
- Mike Lawrence – trumpet
- James Buffington – French horn
- Peter Gordon – French horn

Strings

- David Nadien – concertmaster
- Jonathan Abramowitz and Charles McCracken – cello
- Lamar Alsop and Theodore Israel – viola
- Lamar Alsop, Max Ellen, Barry Finclair, Diana Halprin, Harry Lookofsky, Marvin Morgenstern, Herbert Sorkin and Richard Sortomme – violin

Vocals

- Patti Austin – backing vocals
- Hiram Bullock – backing vocals
- Bob James – backing vocals
- Neil Jason – lead vocals (5)
- Jeff Schoen – backing vocals

Production

- Bob James – producer
- Joe Jorgensen – co-producer, recording, mixing
- Vern Carlson – assistant engineer
- Ollie Cotton – assistant engineer
- Jeff Hendrickson – assistant engineer
- Stan Kalina – mastering at CBS Studios (New York, NY)
- Paula Scher – art direction, design
- Buddy Endress – cover photography
- David Gahr – inside photography

== Charts ==
| Chart (1979) | Peak position |
|---|---|
| Billboard Pop Albums | 42 |
| Billboard Top Jazz Albums | 3 |
