= Sign of the Times (Bob James album) =

Studio album by Bob James
- Released: October 15, 1981
- Studio: A&R Recording, Mediasound Studios and CBS Recording Studios (New York City, New York); Minot Sound (White Plains, New York)
- Genre: Jazz fusion
- Length: 36:39
- Label: Tappan Zee
- Producer: Bob James; Hilary James

Bob James chronology
All Around the Town (1981)	Sign of the Times (1981)	Hands Down (1982)

Professional ratings
Review scores
Source	Rating
AllMusic	3/5 stars
The Rolling Stone Jazz Record Guide	1/5 stars

Sign of the Times is the ninth album by jazz keyboardist Bob James. It is his most pop-influenced album. James was introduced to Rod Temperton, his close collaborator on the album, through his friend Quincy Jones.

The title track has been sampled by De La Soul ("Keepin' The Faith") and Warren G ("Regulate").

== Track listing ==
No.	Title	Writer(s)	Length
1.	"Hypnotique"	Rod Temperton	5:52
2.	"The Steamin' Feeling"	Temperton	5:23
3.	"Enchanted Forest"	Bob James	5:33
4.	"Unicorn"	James	9:03
5.	"Sign of the Times"	Temperton	5:41
6.	"Love Power"	James	5:31

== Personnel ==
- Bob James – acoustic piano, Rhodes piano, all synthesizers, horn and string arrangements, rhythm track and synthesizer arrangements (3, 4, 6), calliope solo (5)
- Steve Khan – guitars (1–5)
- Bruce Dunlap – guitars (6)
- Eric Gale – guitars (6)
- Gary King – bass (1, 2, 5, 6)
- Marcus Miller – bass (3, 4)
- Major Holley – scat contrabass solo (5)
- John Robinson – drums (1, 2, 5)
- Rick Marotta – drums (3, 4)
- Buddy Williams – drums (6)
- Leonard "Doc" Gibbs – percussion (1–5)
- Ralph MacDonald – percussion (2)
- Airto Moreira – percussion (6)
- Tabby Andriello – special effects (5)
- Rod Temperton – rhythm track and synthesizer arrangements (1, 2, 5); horn, string and vocal arrangements

Brass and Woodwinds

- Jay Beckenstein – alto saxophone (3, 4)
- Grover Washington Jr. – tenor saxophone (6)
- Phil Bodner, Eddie Daniels, Wally Kane, George Marge and Whit Sidener – woodwinds
- Jim Pugh and Dave Taylor – trombone
- Jon Faddis, Mike Lawrence and Ron Tooley – trumpet

Strings

- Max Ellen, Barry Finclair, Charles Libove, Jan Mullen, David Nadien, Joseph Rabushka, Richard Sortomme and Gerald Tarack – violin

Vocals

- Patti Austin, Vivian Cherry, Kasey Cisyk, Babi Floyd, Milt Grayson, Hilary James, Yvonne Lewis and Luther Vandross

=== Production ===
- Bob James – producer
- Joe Jorgensen – associate producer, recording, mixing
- Nancy Byers – assistant engineer
- Marc Chusid – assistant engineer
- Chaz Clifton – assistant engineer
- Bruce Robbins – assistant engineer
- Don Wershba – assistant engineer
- Vlado Meller – mastering at CBS Mastering Studios (New York, NY)
- Paula Scher – art direction, design
- Bill King – photography
