= One on One (Bob James and Earl Klugh album) =

Studio album by Bob James and Earl Klugh
- Released: October 1979
- Recorded: 1979
- Studio: Mediasound (New York City, New York)
- Genre: Smooth jazz
- Length: 35:02
- Label: Tappan Zee
- Producer: Bob James; Earl Klugh

Bob James chronology
Lucky Seven (1979)	One on One (1979)	H (1980)

Earl Klugh chronology
Heart String (1979)	One on One (1979)	Dream Come True (1980)

Professional ratings
Review scores
Source	Rating
AllMusic	3/5 stars
Record Mirror	4/5 stars
The Rolling Stone Jazz Record Guide	2/5 stars

One on One is a 1979 collaboration album by jazz keyboardist Bob James and guitarist Earl Klugh that won the Grammy Award for Best Pop Instrumental Performance in 1981. In 1982 the album was certified gold in the United States.

== Track listing ==
No.	Title	Writer(s)	Length
1.	"Kari"	Klugh	6:30
2.	"The Afterglow"	James	6:33
3.	"Love Lips"	Klugh	6:38
4.	"Mallorca"	James	4:48
5.	"I'll Never See You Smile Again"	Klugh	5:27
6.	"Winding River"	James	5:22

== Overview ==
The album was recorded at Mediasound, Sound Palace, and SoundMixers Studios in New York City in 1979. Tape mastering took place at CBS Recording Studio in New York. The album was released in late 1979 by Tappan Zee, the label owned by Bob James, promoted and distributed by Columbia in the US and CBS in the UK.

"Jazz Jam" was a throwaway track assembled by James for the engineers to balance their recording levels. "Jazz Jam" remained unreleased until Bob James found it while re-releasing the album for the Japanese market. "Jazz Jam" was remastered for the 30th anniversary release of the album in 2009 in the US and Europe including the UK. The interview contained as a bonus track on the 30th anniversary edition of the album was recorded in 2009.

== Personnel ==
- Bob James – acoustic piano, Fender Rhodes, arrangements, conductor
- Earl Klugh – acoustic guitar
- Eric Gale – guitars (2, 3, 5)
- Neil Jason – bass guitar (1, 2)
- Gary King – bass guitar (3, 5)
- Ron Carter – acoustic bass (4, 6)
- Harvey Mason – drums
- Ralph MacDonald – percussion

Orchestra

- David Nadien – concertmaster
- Phil Bodner, Wally Kane, George Marge and Romeo Penque – woodwinds
- James Buffington – French horn
- Charles McCracken and Alan Shulman – cello
- Al Brown and Emanuel Vardi – viola
- Harry Cykman, Lewis Eley, Max Ellen, Barry Finclair, Marvin Morgenstern, Matthew Raimondi, Richard Sortomme – violin

=== Production ===
- Bob James – producer
- Joe Jorgensen – recording, mixing
- Tim Benedict – assistant engineer
- Gregory Mann – assistant engineer
- Michel Savage – assistant engineer
- Stan Kalina – mastering at CBS Studios (New York, NY)
- Marion Orr – production coordinator
- Paula Scher – cover design
- Arnold Rosenberg – cover photography
- David Gahr – inside photography

== Charts ==
Album – Billboard
Year	Chart	Position
1979	Jazz Albums	1
1979	The Billboard 200	23
1980	R&B Albums	26
