= Grand Piano Canyon =

Studio album by Bob James
- Released: June 28, 1990
- Studio: Clinton Recording Studios, Inc. (New York, NY); Ocean Way Recording (Hollywood, CA); Remidi Studios (Ardsley-On-Hudson, NY)
- Genre: Jazz
- Length: 48:24
- Label: Warner Bros. Records
- Producer: Bob James

Bob James chronology
J. S. Bach: Concertos for 2 & 3 Keyboards (1989)	Grand Piano Canyon (1990)	Restless (1994)

Professional ratings
Review scores
Source	Rating
AllMusic	4/5 stars
Audioholics	Overall 5

Grand Piano Canyon is the 22nd solo album by Bob James. It was released on June 28, 1990. The cover art is reproduced from an original painting by David Grath entitled "Grand Piano Canyon." The title for the seventh track, "Xraxse" is the planet inhabited by Blue People in a story written by James' daughter, Hilary, at age 6.

== Critical reception ==
Scott Yanow of AllMusic writes, "This CD is more jazz-oriented than most of Bob James' recordings and even takes chances in a few spots. The tunes, mostly by James, contain several strong melodies, including a tribute piece for Sarah Vaughan; among the sidemen are guitarist Lee Ritenour, Kirk Whalum on tenor and soprano, and (in a guest spot) tenor great Michael Brecker."

Stanton Zeff of Audioholics gives the album a rating of 5 overall and says, "This CD had a little bit of everything: big-band ( "Bare Bones" ), smooth jazz ( "Restoration" ), fusion ( "…stop that!" ), and ballads ( "Just Listen" )." He also writes, "It's this last collaboration that led to the creation of one of the great jazz super-groups of the last decade: Fourplay, featuring Harvey Mason on drums and Nathan East on bass, Lee Ritenour on guitars, and Bob James on keyboards."

== Track listing ==
All tracks are written by Bob James, unless otherwise noted.

No.	Title	Writer(s)	Length
1.	"Bare Bones"	Bob James; Max Risenhoover	4:46
2.	"Restoration"		5:46
3.	"Wings for Sarah"		5:37
4.	"Svengali"		4:50
5.	"Worlds Apart"		4:31
6.	"…Stop That!"	Bob James; Max Risenhoover	4:44
7.	"Xraxse"		4:33
8.	"Just Listen"	Lee Ritenour	7:09
9.	"Far from Turtle"	Bob James; Max Risenhoover	6:28
Total length:			48:24

== Personnel ==
All songs written by Bob James, except where noted.

1 – "Bare Bones" (Bob James, Max Risenhoover) - 4:44

- Bob James – acoustic piano, horn arrangements
- Dean Brown – guitar
- Nathan East – bass
- Harvey Mason – drums
- Chris Hunter – alto saxophone
- Andy Snitzer – tenor saxophone
- Roger Rosenberg – baritone saxophone
- Jim Pugh – trombone
- Jon Faddis – trumpet
- Randy Brecker – trumpet
- Mixed by Bill Schnee
- Recorded by Gene Curtis, Max Risenhoover and Al Schmitt.

2 – "Restoration" - 5:44

- Bob James – acoustic piano, arrangements
- Lee Ritenour – guitar
- Nathan East – bass
- Harvey Mason – drums
- Leonard "Doc" Gibbs – percussion
- Mixed by Bill Schnee
- Recorded by Al Schmitt and Bill Schnee.

3 – "Wings For Sarah" - 5:34

- Bob James – acoustic piano, arrangements
- Lee Ritenour – guitar
- Nathan East – bass
- Harvey Mason – drums
- Leonard "Doc" Gibbs – percussion
- Mixed by Bill Schnee
- Recorded by Max Risenhoover and Al Schmitt

4 – "Svengali" - 4:48

- Bob James – acoustic piano, arrangements
- Eric Gale – guitar
- Gary King – bass
- Harvey Mason – drums
- Paulinho da Costa – percussion
- Kirk Whalum – tenor saxophone, soprano saxophone
- Mixed by Bill Schnee
- Recorded by Hank Cicalo, Steve Holroyd, Max Risenhoover and Al Schmitt.

5 – "Worlds Apart" - 4:30

- Bob James – acoustic piano, synthesizers, arrangements
- Dean Brown – guitar
- Abraham Laboriel – bass
- Harvey Mason – drums
- Leonard "Doc" Gibbs – percussion
- Mixed by Max Risenhoover
- Recorded by Max Risenhoover and Al Schmitt.

6 – "…Stop That!" (James, Risenhoover) - 4:43

- Bob James – acoustic piano, arrangements
- Dean Brown – guitar
- Nathan East – bass
- Max Risenhoover – drums, recording, mixing
- Chris Hunter – alto saxophone
- Roger Rosenberg – baritone saxophone
- Michael Brecker – tenor sax solo
- Andy Snitzer – tenor saxophone
- Jim Pugh – trombone
- Jon Faddis – trumpet
- Randy Brecker – trumpet

7 – "Xraxse" - 4:29

- Bob James – acoustic piano, synthesizers, arrangements
- Max Risenhoover – drums, percussion sequencing, recording, mixing

8 – "Just Listen" (Lee Ritenour) - 7:11

- Bob James – acoustic piano, electric piano
- Lee Ritenour – Takamine classical guitar synthesizer, rhythm arrangements
- Nathan East – Clavenger bass
- Harvey Mason – drums, percussion sequencing
- Leonard "Doc" Gibbs – percussion
- Recorded by Max Risenhoove and Al Schmitt.
- Mixed by Bill Schnee

9 – "Far From Turtle" (Risenhoover) - 6:28

- Bob James – acoustic piano
- Max Risenhoover – synthesizers, percussion, arrangements, recording, mixing
- Nathan East – Clevenger bass
- Mary Benander – Japanese phrases

Track information and credits adapted the album's liner notes.

=== Production ===
- Bob James – producer
- Max Risenhoover – associate producer, E-mu Emulator III programming, Opcode Vision programming
- Mark Guilbeault – basic tracking assistant
- Steve Holroyd – basic tracking assistant
- Jackie Brown – horn recording assistant
- Ken Allardyce – mix assistant
- John Kubrick – CD preparation
- Ted Jensen – mastering at Sterling Sound (New York City, New York)
- Marion Orr – production coordinator
- David Grath – original painting for cover artwork
- Peter Paul – management

== Charts ==
Chart (1990)	Peak position
Contemporary Jazz Albums (Billboard)	4
