= Tightrope (Steve Khan album) =

Studio album by Steve Khan
- Released: 1977
- Recorded: March/April 1977
- Studio: Mediasound (New York City)
- Genre: Jazz, Fusion
- Label: Tappan Zee Records (Columbia Records)
- Producer: Bob James

Steve Khan chronology
Tightrope (1977)	The Blue Man (1978)

Professional ratings
Review scores
Source	Rating
AllMusic	4.5/5 stars

Tightrope is the 1977 debut solo album of jazz guitarist Steve Khan.

== Background ==
Bob James who just got him signed to Columbia Records produced the album for his own Tappan Zee label, a sub-division of Columbia. Bob James plays a then fashionable Oberheim polyphonic synthesizer. All other musicians were (at some point) members of the Brecker Brothers band including Khan himself who was part of the band in the years just before his solo debut and was featured on their second album, the 1976 Back to Back and the following Don't Stop the Music. Khan writes: "At the time, I suppose I felt it was my 'mission' to somehow maintain the original sound and line-up of the Brecker Bros. Band, only featuring my guitar a little more." On his website he also states that Tightrope was his best-selling album he has "ever made, and is probably directly attributable to the inclusion of [...] "Darlin' Darlin' Baby," originally recorded by the O'Jays."

== Track listing ==
1. "Some Punk Funk" – 5:20
2. "Darlin' Darlin' Baby (Sweet Tender Love)" (Gamble and Huff, Khan) – 6:29
3. "Tightrope (for Folon)" – 5:44
4. "The Big Ones" (Randy Brecker, Khan) – 6:02
5. "Star Chamber" – 5:19
6. "Soft Summer Breeze" (Eddie Heywood, Judy Spencer) – 5:00
7. "Where Shadows Meet" – 3:40

All tunes written by Steve Khan except as noted parenthetically above.
All arrangements by Steve Kahn, except tracks 2 and 6 arranged by Bob James.

== Personnel ==
- Steve Khan: electric guitar, 12-string electric guitar (tracks 1, 5, 7), acoustic guitar (2)
- Jeff Mironov: electric guitar (exc. 3, 7)
- David Spinozza: electric guitar (3, 7)
- Don Grolnick: piano (1), Fender Rhodes electric piano (2, 3, 6, 7), Clavinet (3, 4, 5), organ (7)
- Bob James: Oberheim polyphonic (exc. 3), Fender Rhodes (1, 4, 5)
- Will Lee: electric bass
- Steve Gadd: drums
- Ralph MacDonald: percussion
- David Sanborn: alto saxophone (2, 4, 5)
- Michael Brecker: tenor saxophone (1, 3, 4)
- Randy Brecker: trumpet (3, 4)
- Jean-Michel Folon: artwork cover

== Charts ==
Chart (1978)	Peakposition
US Billboard Pop Albums	157
US Billboard Top Jazz Albums	14
