= Two of a Kind (Earl Klugh and Bob James album) =

Studio album by Earl Klugh and Bob James
- Released: 1982
- Recorded: 1981
- Studio: Minot (White Plains, New York)
- Genre: Smooth jazz
- Length: 37:48
- Label: Manhattan
- Producer: Earl Klugh; Bob James

Earl Klugh and Bob James chronology
One on One (1979)	Two of a Kind (1982)	Cool (1992)

Two of a Kind is the second album by Earl Klugh and Bob James, released in 1982. The album received a nomination for Best Selling Jazz Album at the NARM Awards in 1983, and peaked at No.1 on the Billboard Jazz chart in January 1983.

== Critical reception ==
Professional ratings
Review scores
Source	Rating
AllMusic	4/5 stars

Ron Wynn of AllMusic writes, "Keyboardist Bob James and acoustic guitarist Earl Klugh struck gold with this session."

Billboard's Top Album Picks for the week ending 11 June 1982 listed Two of a Kind in the Jazz section.

== Track listing ==
No.	Title	Writer(s)	Length
1.	"The Falcon"	Bob James	8:52
2.	"Whiplash"	Harvey Mason; Michael Lang	5:28
3.	"Sandstorm"	Earl Klugh	5:39
4.	"Where I Wander"	Earl Klugh	6:51
5.	"Ingênue"	Bob James	3:06
6.	"Wes"	Earl Klugh	7:52
Total length:			37:48

== Personnel ==
- Bob James – keyboards
- Earl Klugh – acoustic guitar
- Gary King – bass
- Harvey Mason – drums
- Leonard "Doc" Gibbs, Jr. – percussion
- Sammy Figueroa – percussion

Production

- Bob James – producer
- Earl Klugh – producer
- Joe Jorgensen – recording, mixing
- Ron Carran – additional engineer
- Bruce Robbins – assistant engineer
- Vlado Meller – mastering at CBS Recording Studios (New York City, NY)
- Marion Orr – production coordinator
- John Paul Endress – microphotography
- David Gahr – portrait photography
- Bob Heimall – design
- Peter Paul – art direction, cover concept

Track information and credits verified from the album's liner notes.

== Charts ==
Chart (1982–83)	Peak position
Billboard Top LPs & Tape	44
Best Selling Jazz LPs (Billboard)	1
Top Black LPs (Billboard)	23
