= Explosions (Bob James album) =

Studio album by the Bob James Trio
- Released: 1965
- Recorded: May 1965
- Studios: Bell, New York City
- Genres: Free jazz; audio collage; electronic; electro-acoustic jazz
- Length: 34:58
- Labels: ESP-Disk; 1009

Bob James chronology
Bold Conceptions (1963)	Explosions (1965)	One (1974)

Explosions is the second album by the Bob James Trio. It was recorded at Bell Sound Studios in New York City during May 1965, and was released later that year by ESP-Disk. On the album, James is featured on piano, and is joined by bassist Barre Phillips and drummer Robert Pozar. The album also features tape collages by composers Gordon Mumma and Robert Ashley. It is an early example of electro-acoustic jazz.

== Reception ==
Professional ratings
Review scores
Source	Rating
All About Jazz	4/5 stars
AllMusic	2.5/5 stars
DownBeat	5/5 stars
The Penguin Guide to Jazz	3/4 stars

In a review for AllMusic, "Blue" Gene Tyranny called the album "probably the first recording of improvised jazz combined with electronic music, as well as playing inside the piano and other new music techniques," and noted that it "contains lively and often humorous compositions."

The authors of The Penguin Guide to Jazz Recordings wrote: "This is an intriguing period piece, which has considerable staying power... It's important for the integration of electronics into a basic piano trio, and while it's callow in its way it continues to intrigue."

Clifford Allen of All About Jazz stated that James "more than acquits himself as a free player," and commented: "rare indeed is a successful pairing of electronic and acoustic audio collage, much less in a mid-1960s jazz setting."

Writing for Aural Innovations, Doug Walker remarked: "the music explodes with both vitality and subtle introspection... throughout there is a spirit of discovery that's quite refreshing, and the sense of musical optimism pervades the recording!"

== Track listings ==
1. "Explosions" (Bob James, Gordon Mumma) – 5:42
2. "Untitled Mixes" (Bob James, Robert Ashley) – 5:17
3. "Peasant Boy" (Bob James) – 8:30
4. "An On" (Barre Phillips) – 8:54
5. "Wolfman" (Bob James, Robert Ashley) – 6:07

== Personnel ==
- Bob James – piano
- Barre Phillips – bass
- Robert Pozar – drums, percussion
- Robert Ashley – electronics
- Gordon Mumma – electronics
