= Obsession (Bob James album) =

Studio album by Bob James
- Released: October 20, 1986
- Studios: Minot (White Plains, New York); Remedi (Ardsley-On-Hudson, New York)
- Genre: Jazz
- Length: 40:46
- Label: Warner Bros.
- Producers: Bob James; Michael Colina; Ray Bardani

Bob James chronology
The Swan (1984)	Obsession (1986)	The Scarlatti Dialogues (1988)

Obsession is an album by the American musician Bob James, released in 1986. It was James's first solo album for Warner Bros. Records after around a decade with CBS.

== Critical reception ==
The Sun-Sentinel stated that "Bob James' effort to shed his image as the king of Muzak jazz partially succeeds on his latest offering." The Washington Post deemed the album a "made-for-background batch of West Coast fake funk and fusion."

On AllMusic, Jason Elias wrote: "Obsession displays the often chilly sounds of period synthesizers. The only vocal track, 'Gone Hollywood', co-written by Lenny White, has good keyboard textures and plaintive vocals from Lisa Fischer and blistering guitar solos from Steve Khan. [...] While many might be put off by the pure 1980s production values of '3AM' and 'Rousseau', luckily, they have compelling arrangements to ward off boredom. The album's best song, 'Rain', is a methodical and pretty track that is an essential for devotees of the often-maligned late-1980s jazz-pop era. Obsession certainly works better than 12 and is a suitable continuation of the style of early-'80s albums The Genie and Sign of the Times.

== Track listing ==
1. "Obsession" (Micheal Colina, Bob James) - 6:04
2. "Gone Hollywood" (Alan Palanker, Vaneese Thomas, Lenny White) - 6:11
3. "3 A.M." (Lenny White, Bernard Wright) - 5:24
4. "Rousseau" (Micheal Colina) - 6:01
5. "Rain" (Bob James) - 6:53
6. "Steady" (Bob James) - 5:41
7. "Feel the Fire" (Gary King) - 4:32

== Personnel ==
- Bob James – keyboards, computer programming
- Michael Colina – computer programming, drum programming
- Steve Khan – guitars, guitar solo (2)
- Nick Moroch – guitars, guitar solo (3)
- Marcus Miller – bass guitar
- Ray Bardani – drum programming
- Lenny White – drum programming (2)
- Michael Brecker – saxophone, EWI solo (4)
- Andy Snitzer – saxophone
- Kirk Whalum – saxophone, sax solo (6)
- Randy Brecker – trumpet
- Jon Faddis – trumpet
- Sharon Bryant – vocals
- Renee Diggs – vocals
- Lisa Fischer – vocals, lead vocals (2)
- Vaneese Thomas – vocals

Production

- Bob James – producer
- Michael Colina – producer
- Ray Bardani – producer, engineer, mixing
- George Marino – mastering at Sterling Sound (New York City, New York)
- Marion Orr – production coordinator
- Janet Levinson – art direction, design
- James Endicott – illustration
- John Russell – photography
