= Bold Conceptions =

Studio album by Bob James
- Released: 1963
- Recorded: August 13–15, 1962
- Studio: Universal Recording, Chicago
- Genre: Jazz
- Length: 43:37
- Label: Mercury
- Producer: Quincy Jones

Bob James chronology
Bold Conceptions (1963)	Explosions (1965)

Professional ratings
Review scores
Source	Rating
Allmusic	3/5 stars

Bold Conceptions is the debut album by the Bob James Trio. The album was recorded between August 13–15, 1962. The cover features a drawing of Bob James at the piano.

== Track listing ==
1. "Moment's Notice" (John Coltrane, Ernie Wilkins) – 3:09
2. "Nardis" (Miles Davis) – 5:30
3. "The Night We Call It a Day" (Tom Adair, Matt Dennis) – 3:10
4. "Trilogy" (James) – 6:42
5. "Quest" (James) – 4:10
6. "My Love" (Leonard Bernstein) – 5:14
7. "Fly Me to the Moon" (Bart Howard) – 4:43
8. "Birks' Works" (Dizzy Gillespie) – 4:36
9. "Softly, as in a Morning Sunrise" (Oscar Hammerstein II, Sigmund Romberg) – 3:39
10. "Ghost Riders in the Sky" (Stan Jones) – 3:29

== Personnel ==
- Bob James – piano
- Ron Brooks – bass
- Robert Pozar – drums
