= First Prize! =

Studio album by Eddie Daniels
- Released: 1967
- Recorded: September 8 & 12, 1966
- Studio: Van Gelder Studio, Englewood Cliffs, New Jersey
- Genre: Jazz
- Length: 46:42
- Label: Prestige; PR/PRST 7506
- Producer: Cal Lampley

Eddie Daniels chronology
First Prize! (1967)	This Is New (1968)

First Prize! is an album by saxophonist/clarinetist Eddie Daniels recorded in 1966 and released on the Prestige label the following year.

== Reception ==
Professional ratings
Review scores
Source	Rating
Allmusic	4.5/5 stars
The Penguin Guide to Jazz Recordings	3/4 stars

Allmusic awarded the album 4½ stars with Scott Yanow stating "When one hears this early Eddie Daniels set, it is surprising to realize that he would remain in relative obscurity for almost another 20 years. As shown on the three of the eight selections on which he plays clarinet, Daniels even at this early stage ranked near the top, while his tenor playing on the remaining numbers was already personal and virtuosic".

== Track listing ==
All compositions by Eddie Daniels except where noted

1. "Felicidade" (Antônio Carlos Jobim, Vinícius de Moraes) – 9:48
2. "That Waltz" – 6:56
3. "Falling in Love with Love" (Richard Rodgers, Lorenz Hart) – 4:40
4. "Love's Long Journey" – 2:05
5. "Time Marches On" – 4:05
6. "The Spanish Flea" (Julius Wechter) – 4:50
7. "The Rocker" – 3:37
8. "How Deep Is the Ocean?" (Irving Berlin) – 10:41

== Personnel ==
- Eddie Daniels – tenor saxophone, clarinet
- Roland Hanna – piano
- Richard Davis – bass
- Mel Lewis – drums
