= Don't You Worry 'bout a Thing (album) =

Studio album by Hank Crawford
- Released: 1975
- Recorded: June 1974
- Studio: Van Gelder Studio, Englewood Cliffs, New Jersey
- Genre: Jazz; Soul
- Length: 34:57
- Label: Kudu
- Producer: Creed Taylor

Don't You Worry 'bout a Thing is a soul-jazz album by saxophonist Hank Crawford, released in 1975 on Kudu Records.

== Track listing ==
1. "Don't You Worry 'bout a Thing" (S. Wonder) – 8:48
2. "Jana" (Crawford) – 5:06
3. "All in Love Is Fair" (S. Wonder) – 4:45
4. "Sho Is Funky" (B. James, H. Crawford) – 12:45
5. "Groove Junction" – 3:33

== Personnel ==
- Hank Crawford – alto sax
- Jerry Dodgion – flute, tenor sax
- Joe Farrell – flute, tenor sax
- Pepper Adams – baritone sax
- Romeo Penque – baritone sax
- Jon Faddis – trumpet, flugelhorn
- Randy Brecker – trumpet, flugelhorn
- Alan Rubin – trumpet, flugelhorn
- Hugh McCracken – guitar
- Richard Tee – keyboards
- Bob James – keyboards, arranger, conductor
- Ron Carter – bass
- Gary King – bass
- Bernard Purdie – drums
- Idris Muhammad – drums
- Ralph MacDonald – percussion
