= Eddie Daniels =

American musician and composer

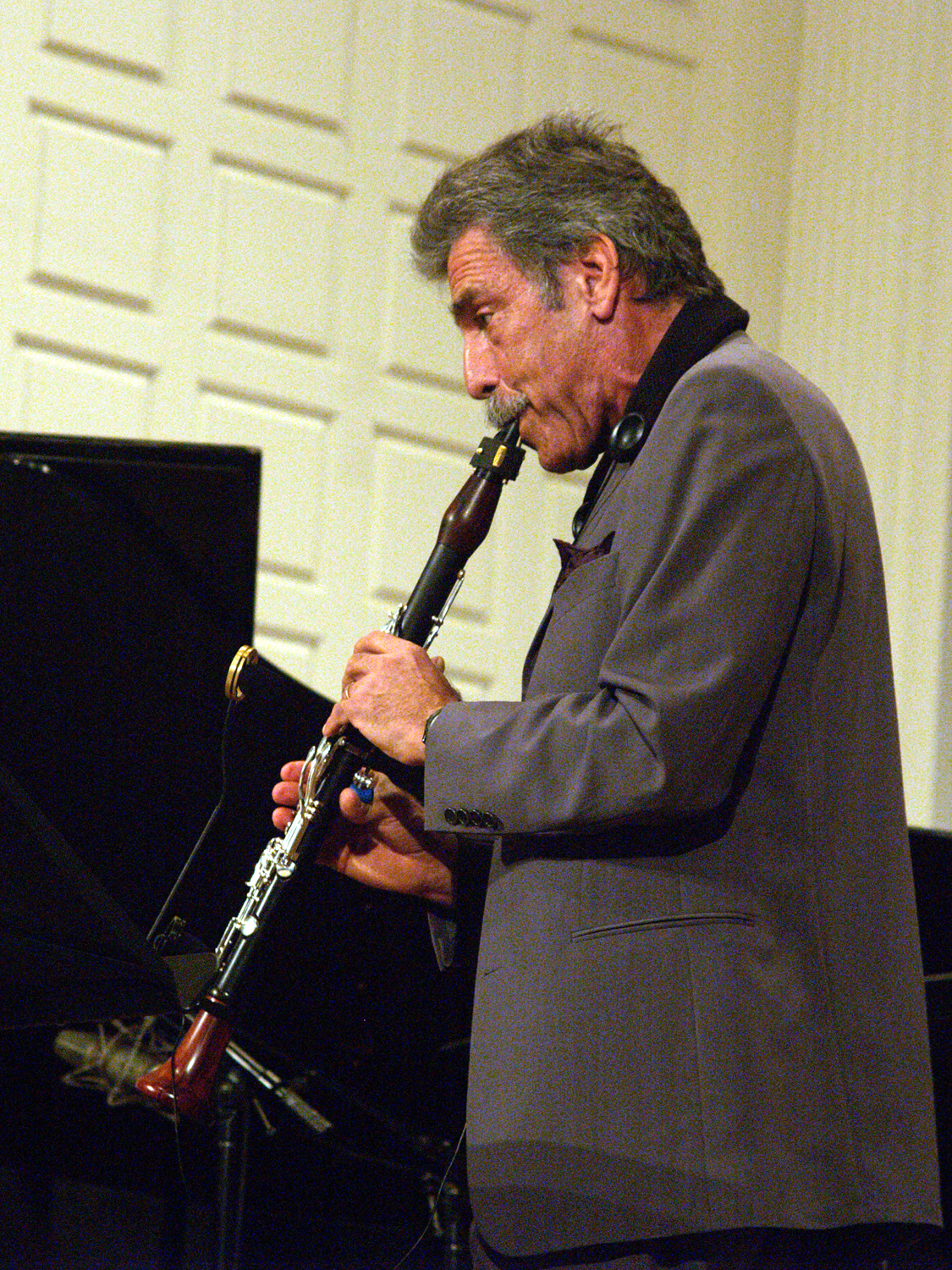
- Eddie Daniels in concert, New Haven, Connecticut, September 14, 2007

Background information
- Born: October 19, 1941 (age 84); New York City
- Genres: Jazz, classical
- Occupation: Musician
- Instruments: Clarinet, Tenor Saxophone, Flute
- Years active: 1950s–present
- Labels: Prestige, Columbia, Candid, Muse, GRP, Chesky, Shanachie
- Formerly of: The Thad Jones/Mel Lewis Orchestra
- Website: www.eddiedanielsclarinet.net

Eddie Daniels (born October 19, 1941) is an American musician and composer. Although he is best known as a jazz clarinetist, he has also played saxophone and flute as well as classical music on clarinet.

== Early life, family and education ==
Daniels was born in New York City to a Jewish family. His mother emigrated from Romania. He was raised in the Manhattan Beach neighborhood of Brooklyn in New York City.

He became interested in jazz as a teenager when he was impressed by the musicians accompanying singers, such as Frank Sinatra, on recordings. Daniels' first instrument was the alto saxophone. At the age of 13 he was also playing clarinet, and by the age of 15 he had played at the Newport Jazz Festival youth competition.

== Career ==
Daniels has toured and recorded with a variety of bands, small groups and orchestras, and appeared on television many times. He has played with Bucky Pizzarelli, Freddie Hubbard, Billy Joel, Don Patterson, and Richard Davis. DownBeat gave Daniels the New Star on Clarinet Award in 1968.

He was a member for six years of The Thad Jones/Mel Lewis Orchestra, playing tenor saxophone, clarinet and flute. On the album Presenting Joe Williams and the Thad Jones/Mel Lewis Jazz Orchestra, his solo on "Evil Man Blues" was mistakenly credited to his colleague Joe Farrell.

Since the 1980s, he has focused mainly on the clarinet. In 1989, he won a Grammy Award for his contribution to the Roger Kellaway arrangement of "Memos from Paradise".

He worked with Gordon Goodwin's Big Phat Band, on the album Swingin' for the Fences, the first album by the band. He was featured in Goodwin's arrangement of Mozart's 40th symphony in G minor on XXL and on the Big Phat Band album The Phat Pack.

In 2009, Swiss composer and saxophonist Daniel Schnyder composed MATRIX 21, a Concerto for Clarinet and Orchestra, for Daniels and dedicated it to him. It was commissioned by the Orchestre de Chambre de Lausanne (Switzerland) and world-premiered in Lausanne under its artistic director Christian Zacharias in January 2010. The American premiere took place at the Crested Butte Music Festival on July 18, 2010, under the direction of music director Jens Georg Bachmann.

== Discography ==
=== As leader ===
- 1966 First Prize! (Prestige)
- 1968 This Is New (Columbia)
- 1973 Flower for All Seasons (Choice)
- 1973 Blue Bossa (Candid)
- 1977 Brief Encounter (Muse)
- 1978 Street Wind (Marlin)
- 1980 Morning Thunder (Columbia)
- 1986 Breakthrough (GRP)
- 1987 To Bird with Love (GRP)
- 1988 Memos from Paradise (GRP)
- 1989 Blackwood (GRP)
- 1990 Nepenthe (GRP)
- 1991 This Is Now (GRP)
- 1992 Benny Rides Again (GRP)
- 1993 Brahms: Clarinet Quintet, Op. 115 (Reference)
- 1993 Under the Influence (GRP)
- 1994 Real Time (Chesky)
- 1995 The Five Seasons (Shanachie)
- 1997 Beautiful Love (Shanachie)
- 1999 Blues for Sabine (EMI)
- 2000 Swing Low Sweet Clarinet (Shanachie)
- 2004 Crossing the Line (Summit)
- 2005 Mean What You Say (IPO)
- 2006 Beautiful Love (Shanachie)
- 2007 Homecoming: Eddie Daniels Live at the Iridium (IPO)
- 2009 A Duet of One (IPO)
- 2012 Live at the Library of Congress (IPO)
- 2013 Duke at the Roadhouse: Live in Santa Fe (IPO)
- 2017 Just Friends: Live at the Village Vangaurd (Resonance)
- 2018 Heart of Brazil (Resonance)
- 2020 Night Kisses (Resonance)

=== As sideman ===
With The Thad Jones/Mel Lewis Orchestra

- 1966 Presenting Joe Williams and the Thad Jones/Mel Lewis Jazz Orchestra
- 1967 Live at the Village Vanguard
- 1968 Monday Night
- 1969 Central Park North
- 1969 Swiss Radio Days Jazz Series, Vol. 4: Beasle, 1969
- 1970 Consummation
- 1970 Jones & Lewis
- 1970 Village Vanguard Live Sessions
- 1970 Village Vanguard Live Sessions, Vol. 3 same as Live at the Village Vanguard 1967
- 2006 Live on Tour Switzerland

With Bob James

- 1975 Two
- 1976 Three
- 1977 BJ 4
- 1977 Heads
- 1980 H
- 1981 All Around the Town
- 1981 Sign of the Times
- 1982 Hands Down
- 1983 The Genie: Themes & Variations from the TV Series Taxi
- 1984 12

With Eric Gale

- 1977 Ginseng Woman
- 1978 Multiplication
- 1979 Part of You

With Jimmy McGriff

- Tailgunner (LRC, 1977)
- Outside Looking In (1978)

With Billy Joel

- 1982 The Nylon Curtain
- 1983 An Innocent Man
- 1986 The Bridge

With Dave Grusin

- 1987 Cinemagic
- 1989 The Fabulous Baker Boys
- 1991 The Gershwin Connection
- 1992 GRP All-Star Big Band
- 1993 Dave Grusin Presents GRP All-Star Big Band Live!

With Don Sebesky

- Moving Lines (1984)
- I Remember Bill (1998)

With Arturo Sandoval

- Swingin' (GRP, 1996)
- Dear Diz (Every Day I Think of You) (Concord Jazz, 2012)

With others

- 1969 Freddie Hubbard, The Hub of Hubbard (MPS)
- 1969 Richard Davis Muses for Richard Davis (MPS)
- 1970 Dave Pike, The Doors of Perception (Vortex)
- 1972 Don Patterson The Return of Don Patterson (Muse)
- 1973 Dakota Staton, I Want a Country Man (Groove Merchant)
- 1973 Johnny Hammond, Higher Ground (Kudu)
- 1974 O'Donel Levy, Simba (Groove Merchant)
- 1974 Groove Holmes, New Groove (Groove Merchant)
- 1974 Yusef Lateef, 10 Years Hence (Atlantic)
- 1974 Airto Moreira, Virgin Land (Salvation)
- 1976 George Benson and Joe Farrell, Benson & Farrell (CTI)
- 1976 Earl Klugh, Living Inside Your Love
- 1977 Bucky Pizzarelli, Bucky's Bunch
- 1978 Jimmy Ponder, All Things Beautiful
- 1978 Angela Bofill, Angie
- 1978 Billy Cobham, Simplicity of Expression
- 1978 Lee Ritenour, The Captain's Journey
- 1980 Stanley Turrentine, Inflation
- 1981 George Benson, GB
- 1989 Fred Hersch, The French Collection
- 1990 Teresa Brewer, Cotton Connection
- 1994 Ben Sidran, Life's a Lesson
- 1996 Chuck Loeb, The Music Inside
- 1998 Joe Williams, One for My Baby
- 2001 Gordon Goodwin's Big Phat Band, Swingin' for the Fences
- 2003 John Pizzarelli, Sing! Sing! Sing!
- 2004 Claus Ogerman, A Man and His Music
- 2007 O'Donel Levy, Hand of Fire
- 2008 Roger Kellaway, Live at the Jazz Standard
- 2010 James Moody, Moody 4B
