= Steve Khan =

American jazz guitarist (born 1947)

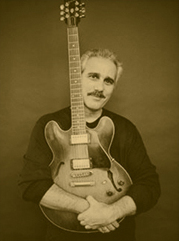

Background information
- Born: Steven Harris Cahn; April 28, 1947 (age 79); Los Angeles, California, U.S.
- Genres: Jazz; jazz fusion
- Occupations: Musician; producer
- Instrument: Guitar
- Years active: 1969–present
- Labels: Columbia; Novus; Antilles; Denon; GRP; Mesa/Bluemoon; Verve; Evidence; Tone Center
- Website: stevekhan.com

Steve Khan (born Steven Harris Cahn; April 28, 1947) is an American jazz guitarist.

== Early life, family and education ==
Steven Harris Cahn was born in Los Angeles, California. His father, lyricist Sammy Cahn, "loved to hear any and all versions of his songs". Steve took piano lessons as a child.

== Career ==
Cahn played drums for the surf rock band the Chantays. The band's guitarist exposed him to the albums Tough Talk by The Crusaders and Movin' Wes by Wes Montgomery. In his late teens, Cahn quit the drums and started playing guitar. He was a member of the R&B band Friends of Distinction, recorded with keyboardist Phil Moore, then played on the album Bullitt by Wilton Felder ("one of my heroes"). Despite his father's advice to avoid a career in the music business, he graduated from UCLA with a degree in music composition and theory. Early in his career, Khan changed the spelling of his surname in order to "create a separate identity from [his] famous father" and because he was "so hurt and angry with him for so many childhood things."

In the early 1970s, he performed in an acoustic guitar duo with Larry Coryell and was a member of the Brecker Brothers band. As a session musician, he appeared on albums by Ashford & Simpson, Rupert Holmes, Billy Joel, and Steely Dan. He was signed to Columbia Records through the efforts of Bobby Colomby and Bob James. On his first three albums Tightrope (1977), The Blue Man (1978), and Arrows (1979), he was trying "to single-handledly keep alive the sound of the original Brecker Brothers band." His next album was Evidence (1980), which contained an eighteen-minute medley of songs by Thelonious Monk.

He has also produced recordings for fellow guitarists Larry Coryell, Mike Stern, Biréli Lagrène, and Bill Connors, as well as pianist Eliane Elias.

== Awards and honors ==
- Grammy Award nomination, Local Color (1987)
- Grammy Award nomination, Borrowed Time (2007)
- Named to list of "22 All-Time Greatest Jazz Guitarists", Jazz Life magazine (1998)

== Discography ==
=== As leader ===
Release date	Title	Label	Musicians
1977	Two for the Road	Arista	Acoustic guitar duo with Larry Coryell
1977	Tightrope	Tappan Zee	With the Brecker Brothers, Steve Gadd, Don Grolnick, Will Lee, Jeff Mironov, Ralph MacDonald.
1978	The Blue Man	CBS	line-up similar to 1977
1979	Arrows	Columbia	similar to 1977, Rick Marotta, Gadd, Mounsey, Errol "Crusher" Bennett. David Sanborn on two tracks.
1980	Evidence	Arista Novus	Solo guitar with compositions by Wayne Shorter, Horace Silver, Thelonious Monk.
1981	Eyewitness	Antilles	Eyewitness quartet with Anthony Jackson, Steve Jordan, Manolo Badrena.
1985	Modern Times	Polydor	Eyewitness quartet. Recorded live in Tokyo, Japan.
1984	Casa Loco	Antilles	Eyewitness quartet.
1987	Helping Hand	Polydor	Eyewitness quartet plus Bill Evans, Clifford Carter, Neil Jason, Christopher Parker, Café, Japan only release.
1987	Local Color	Passport	Duo with Rob Mounsey.
1989	Public Access	GRP	Eyewitness quartet as Khan, Anthony Jackson, Manolo Badrena, Dave Weckl.
1991	Let's Call This	Blue Moon	Trio with Ron Carter and Al Foster.
1992	Headline	Blue Moon	Trio with Carter and Foster.
1994	Crossings	PolyGram	Eyewitness quartet
1994	The Collection	Columbia	Best Of from the Columbia years 1977-79
1997	Got My Mental	Evidence	Trio with John Patitucci and Jack DeJohnette plus four percussionists: Café, Bobby Allende, Don Alias, Marc Quiñones.
1998	You Are Here	SIAM Records	Duo with Rob Mounsey featuring Marc Quiñones.
1999	New Horizons	Concord Picante Records	Co-Leader with Dave Samuels and Dave Valentin.
2000	Paraíso	Concord Picante Records	Co-Leader with Dave Samuels and Dave Valentin.
2005	The Green Field	Tone Center	Quartet with Patitucci, DeJohnette, Badrena, plus Roberto Quintero and Ralph Irizarry.
2007	Borrowed Time	Tone Center	Sextet with Patitucci, DeJohnette, Badrena, Quintero, Irizarry.
2008	The Suitcase: Live in Köln '94	Tone Center	Eyewitness trio with Dennis Chambers and Anthony Jackson.
2011	Parting Shot	Tone Center	Eyewitness quartet plus Allende, Quiñones.
2014	Subtext	Tone Center	Quintet with Chambers, Allende, Quiñones, Rubén Rodriguez.
2015	Tightrope-The Blue Man-Arrows	BGO Records(UK)	The Columbia Years 1977-79.
2016	Eyewitness-Modern Times-Casa Loco	BGO Records(UK)	Eyewitness from 1981-83 w/ Anthony Jackson, Steve Jordan & Manolo Badrena
2017	Backlog	Tone Center	Featuring Allende, Quiñones, Rodriguez, Mark Walker, Mounsey, Randy Brecker, Mintzer, Mainieri, Tatiana Parra.
2018	Public Access-Headline-Crossings	BGO Records(UK)	Eyewitness from 1989-94.
2019	Patchwork	Tone Center	Featuring Allende, Quiñones, Rodriguez, Chambers, Mounsey, Randy Brecker, Mintzer, Tatiana Parra, Jorge Estrada.
2022	Island Letter	Blue Canoe	Featuring: Mark Kibble, Rob Mounsey, Rubén Rodríguez and Marc Quiñones.

=== As sideman ===
Date	Main recording artist	Album	Label	Notes
1974	Czesław Niemen	Mourner's Rhapsody	CBS Records International	released 1974 in West Germany, 1975 in UK and 1976 in US (by Import Records)
1975	Luther Allison	Night Life	Tamla Motown	
1977	Ashford & Simpson	Send It		
1977	Ashford & Simpson	So So Satisfied		
1979	Ashford & Simpson	Stay Free		
1976	Patti Austin	End of a Rainbow		
1977	Patti Austin	Havana Candy		
1979	Gato Barbieri	Euphoria	A&M	Khan on one track
1975	Joe Beck	Beck	Kudu	Khan as second guitarist
1979	Joe Beck & David Sanborn	Beck & Sanborn	Kudu, CTI	
1976	George Benson/Joe Farrell	Benson & Farrell	CTI	Khan on two tracks
1977	Walter Bishop Jr.	Soul Village		
1976	Brecker Brothers	Back to Back		
1977	Brecker Brothers	Don't Stop the Music		
1969	Tim Buckley	Blue Afternoon		
2000	Caribbean Jazz Project	New Horizons		
2001	Caribbean Jazz Project	Paraiso		
2000	Jimmy Cobb	So Nobody Else Can Hear		
1977	Billy Cobham	Inner Conflicts		
1978	Billy Cobham	Alivemutherforya		
1978	Billy Cobham	Simplicity of Expression		
2007	Paula Cole	Courage		
1975	Larry Coryell	Level One	Arista	12-string guitar on title track
1975	Larry Coryell	Planet End	Vanguard	Guest appearance
1976	Larry Coryell	Aspects	Arista	Guest appearance on acoustic guitar
1989	Eddie Daniels	Blackwood		
1989	Miles Davis	Amandla	Warner	
1992	Mark Egan	Beyond Words		
1989	Elements	Liberal Arts		
1982	Donald Fagen	The Nightfly		Acoustic guitar on "New Frontier"
1969	Wilton Felder	Bullitt		
1977	Maynard Ferguson	New Vintage		
1985	Aretha Franklin	Who's Zoomin' Who?		
1989	Aretha Franklin	Through the Storm		
1982	Michael Franks	Objects of Desire		
1985	Michael Franks	Skin Dive		
1987	Michael Franks	The Camera Never Lies		
1993	Michael Franks	Dragonfly Summer		
1999	Michael Franks	Barefoot on the Beach		
1982	Randy Goodrum	Fool's Paradise	Polydor	
1976	Grant Green	The Main Attraction		
1976	Freddie Hubbard	Windjammer		
1977	Bob James	Heads	Tappan Zee/Columbia	
1979	Bob James	Lucky Seven	Tappan Zee/Columbia	
1981	Bob James	Sign of the Times	Tappan Zee/Columbia	
1981	Bob James	All Around the Town	Tappan Zee/Columbia	
1983	Bob James	The Genie: Themes & Variations from the TV Series "Taxi"	Tappan Zee/Columbia	
1983	Bob James	Foxie	Tappan Zee/Columbia	
1984	Bob James	12	Tappan Zee/Columbia	
1987	Bob James	Obsession	Warner Bros.	
1995	Bob James	The Swan	Tappan Zee/Columbia	
1977	Billy Joel	The Stranger	Columbia	
1978	Billy Joel	52nd Street	Columbia	
1980	Chaka Khan	Naughty		
1976	Hubert Laws	Romeo & Juliet	Columbia	Khan on one track
1977	Kenny Loggins	Celebrate Me Home		
1981	Mike Mainieri	Wanderlust	Warner Bros.	
1976	Steve Marcus	Sometime Other Than Now		
1992	Mendoza/Mardin Project	Jazzpaña		
2005	Jason Miles	Cozmopolitan	Jason Miles	Khan on one track. Self-released recording from 1979.
1969	Phil Moore Jr.	Right On	Atlantic	
1977	Walter Murphy	Rhapsody in Blue	Private Stock	Khan on two tracks.
1978	Pages	Pages		
1978	Eddie Palmieri	Euphoria		
1975	Esther Phillips w/Beck	What a Diff'rence a Day Makes	Kudu, CTI	Khan on rhythm guitar
1976	Esther Phillips	Capricorn Princess	Kudu, CTI	Khan on three tracks.
1976	Esther Phillips with Beck	For All We Know	Kudu, CTI	Khan on rhythm guitar.
1989	Lou Rawls	At Last	Blue Note	Khan on three tracks.
1990	Lou Rawls	It's Supposed to Be Fun	Blue Note	Khan on three tracks.
1997	Philippe Saisse	Next Voyage		
1996	Salt & Sugar	-Concerts-	Fun House	Khan on two tracks.
1989	Dave Samuels	Ten Degrees North		
1998	Dave Samuels	Tjader-ized: A Cal Tjader Tribute		
1975	David Sanborn	Taking Off	Warner Bros.	Khan is main guitarist here and wrote two of the nine tracks.
1978	Helen Schneider	Let It Be Now		
1985	Diane Schuur	Deedles		
1988	Diane Schuur	Talkin' 'Bout You		
1980	Don Sebesky	Sebesky Fantasy		
1993	John Sebastian	Tar Beach		
1978	Ben Sidran	Live at Montreux	Arista	
1984	Ben Sidran	Bop City	Antilles, Baybridge	
1993	Ben Sidran	Life's a Lesson	Go Jazz	
2013	Janis Siegel	Nightsongs: A Late Night Interlude		
1977	Phoebe Snow	Never Letting Go		
1978	Phoebe Snow	Against the Grain		
1977	Steely Dan	Aja		Khan on one track.
1980	Steely Dan	Gaucho		
1989	Steps Ahead	N.Y.C.		
1992	Steps Ahead	Yin-Yang		
1988	Mike Stern	Time in Place		
1999	Dave Valentin	Sunshower		
1976	Grover Washington Jr.	A Secret Place		
1989	Kirk Whalum	The Promise		
2005	Joe Zawinul	Weather Update		
2003	Guillermo Carrasco	Una a la vez	eMG	Khan on guitar, tracks El Camino, El Arbol, Lucía.

== Books ==
- Pentatonic Khancepts (Alfred Music, 2002)
- Contemporary Chord Khancepts (Alfred Music, 1996)
- Wes Montgomery Guitar Folio (Jamey Aebersold, 1973)
- Pat Martino: The Early Years (Alfred Music, 1991)
