= Bob James (musician) =

American jazz keyboardist, arranger, and record producer

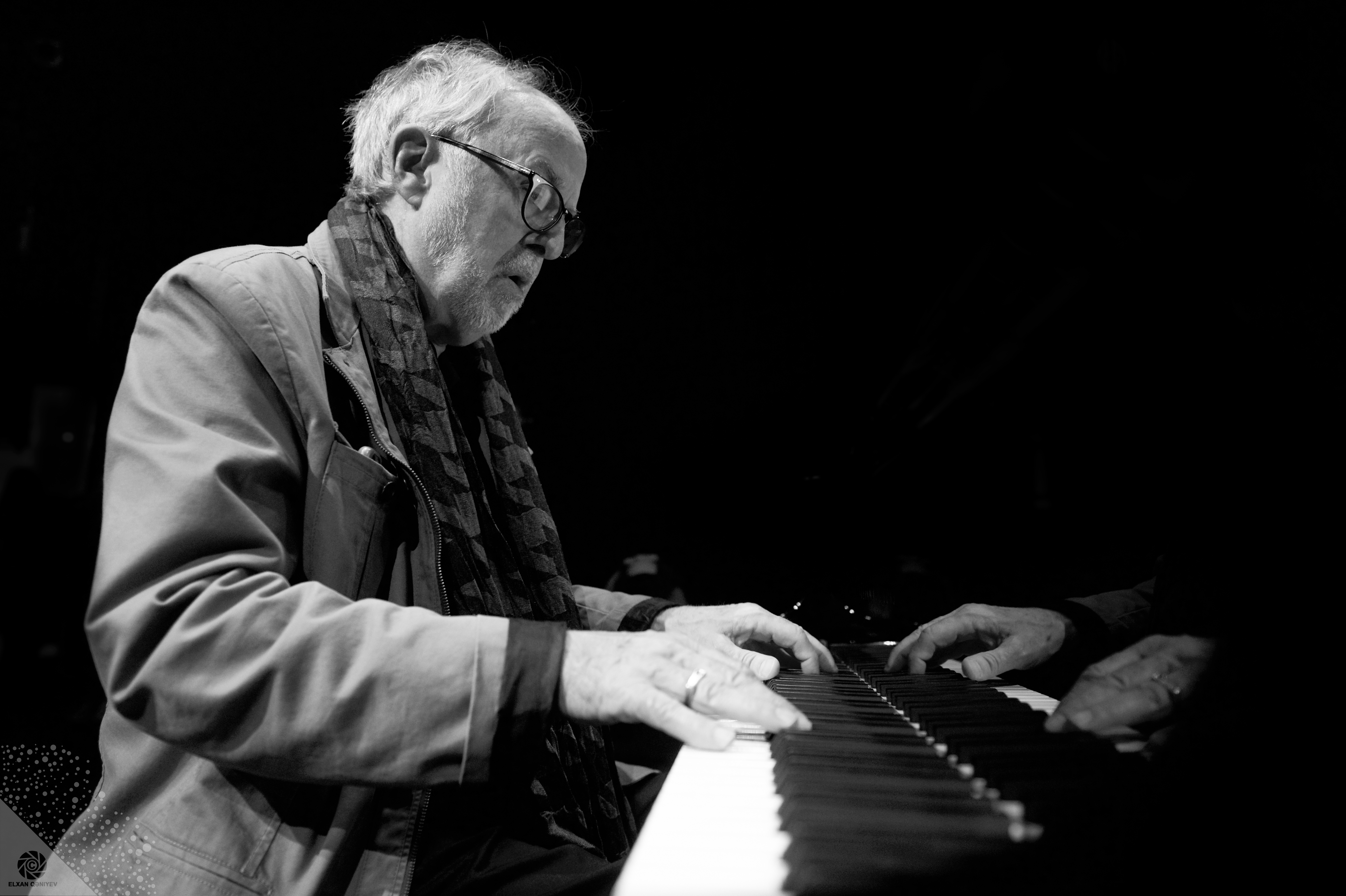
- James performing in 2015

Background information
- Born: Robert McElhiney James; December 25, 1939 (age 86); Marshall, Missouri, U.S.
- Genres: Jazz; smooth jazz; jazz fusion; jazz-funk
- Occupations: Musician; composer; arranger; record producer
- Instrument: Keyboards
- Years active: 1962–present
- Labels: CTI; Tappan Zee; Koch; Columbia; Warner Bros.
- Member of: Fourplay
- Website: Official website

Robert McElhiney James (born December 25, 1939) is an American jazz keyboardist, arranger, and record producer. He founded the band Fourplay and wrote "Angela", the theme song for the TV show Taxi. According to VICE, music from his first seven albums has often been sampled and has been widely used in hip hop. Among his most well known recordings are "Nautilus", "Westchester Lady", "Tappan Zee", and his version of "Take Me to the Mardi Gras".

== Early life and family ==
James was born on Christmas Day of 1939 in Marshall, Missouri, United States. He started playing the piano at age four. His first piano teacher, Sister Mary Elizabeth, who taught at Mercy Academy, discovered that he had perfect pitch. At age seven, James began to study with R. T. Dufford, a teacher at Missouri Valley College. At age 15, James continued his studies with Franklin Launer, a teacher at Christian College in Columbia, Missouri, with more music instruction during high school from Harold Lickey, conductor of the Marshall High School Band and Orchestra. Apart from the piano, James learned to play trumpet, timpani, and percussion. From 1950 to 1956, he competed in the Missouri State Fair piano competitions and received several blue ribbons.

James attended the University of Michigan, but during his second year transferred to Berklee College of Music in Boston, Massachusetts. At Berklee his roommate was saxophonist Nick Brignola.

== Music career ==
His first professional music job was when he was eight years old, playing for a tap dance class at Mercy Academy. During his adolescence, James's music career proliferated. Early jobs included being a member of the Earle Parsons Dance Band (c. 1952–55) which played various engagements around the Marshall area. During this time, he penned his first dance band arrangement.

During the summer of 1955, at Lake of the Ozarks in Missouri, James played for dancing and occasional jam sessions with the Bob Falkenhainer Quartet on the Governor McClurg Excursion Boat in the evenings. He recalls that "during the day we had free time and I became a proficient water skier that summer!" At age 16, a solo engagement followed in the summer when James traveled with good friend Ben Swinger to Colorado and ended up with a job in the piano bar at the Steads Ranch resort in Estes Park.

=== Discovery by Quincy Jones ===
While in college at Michigan, James played free jazz with musicians in Ann Arbor and Detroit. In 1962, his band entered the Notre Dame Collegiate Jazz Festival, where the judges included Henry Mancini and Quincy Jones. The trio entered the competition not expecting to win but wanting to provide some avant-garde music in a contest field that was primarily straight ahead music. To the trio's surprise, they won the competition. Not long after, Jones signed James to an album deal with Mercury Records. Mercury released James's first album, Bold Conceptions (1963), a somewhat free jazz exploration that was produced by Quincy Jones and that differed from the smooth jazz for which he would later become known.

In New York City, James worked as an arranger and was hired as piano accompanist for jazz singer Sarah Vaughan. He reunited with Quincy Jones when Jones asked him to do some arranging for studio sessions. Creed Taylor, producer and founder of CTI Records, was at the sessions and hired James to work for CTI as a producer, arranger, and studio musician. In the 1970s, James worked on albums by Gabor Szabo, Milt Jackson, Stanley Turrentine, Grover Washington, Jr. (notably on Mister Magic), and Maynard Ferguson.

=== Solo albums and collaborations ===
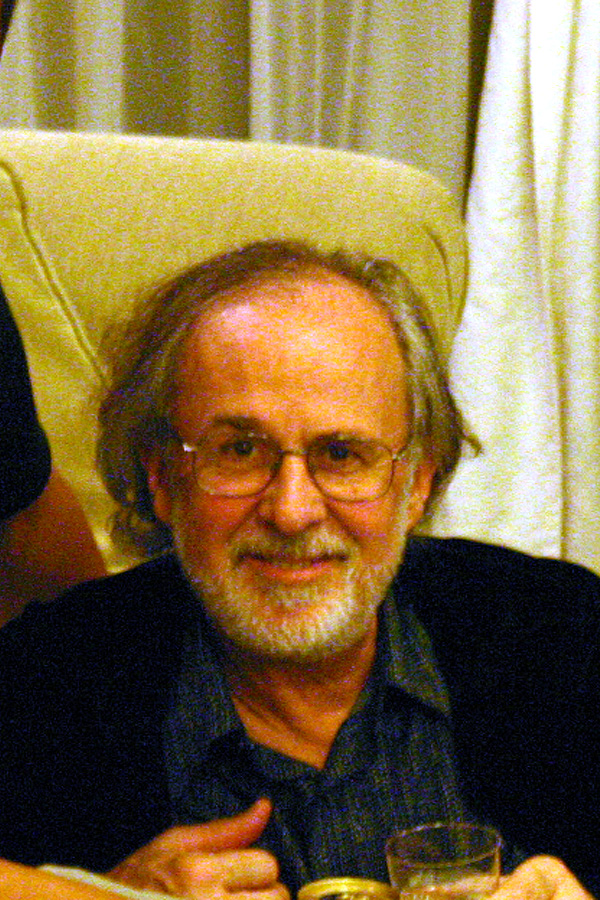
Bob James, 2004

Creed Taylor invited James to record a solo album. The result, One (CTI, 1974), contained the song "Feel Like Making Love", with which Roberta Flack had already had a hit. James had been hired to play piano for the song on Roberta Flack's album two weeks before recording a version of his own, using the same band. Radio stations played both and contributed to the commercial success of One. The album was notable for adapting classical music to a modern-day scene, e.g. "In The Garden" was based on Pachelbel's Canon in D and "Night on Bald Mountain" was a cover of Modest Mussorgsky's composition of the same name.

After three solo albums, James founded his own record label, Tappan Zee. Immediately thereafter, he cut a disco version of the Theme to Star Trek: The Motion Picture, a 45 of which was included with the soundtrack LP, and recorded the album Touchdown (Tappan Zee/Columbia/CBS, 1978). Among the songs on the album was "Angela", the theme song for the TV show Taxi. James provided all the music for Taxi and collected some of its music, including "Angela", on The Genie: Themes & Variations from the TV Series Taxi (Columbia/CBS, 1983). When he toured in 1979, he was supported by a marketing campaign that included posters of him at the wheel of a New York yellow cab. The performances were documented on the album All Around the Town (Tappan Zee/Columbia/CBS, 1980), with a cover of James at the wheel of a taxi.

James turned from smooth jazz to classical music to record Rameau (CVS Masterworks, 1984), his interpretations of Baroque-period composer Jean-Philippe Rameau. In later albums, he interpreted the work of two more Baroque composers, J. S. Bach and Domenico Scarlatti.

A year after Rameau, he moved to Warner Bros. Records and collaborated with David Sanborn on Double Vision (Warner Bros., 1986); the album won a Grammy Award for Best Jazz Fusion Performance. He would record albums for Warner Bros. (which also reissued Bob James' CTI and Tappan Zee/Columbia back catalog in the mid-1990s) for the next seventeen years. His collaboration with Earl Klugh, One on One, won a Grammy Award for Best Pop Instrumental Performance in 1980 and has sold over one million copies. Another collaboration with Klugh, Cool, (Warner Bros., 1992) was nominated for a Grammy, as was Joined at the Hip (Warner Bros., 1996) with Kirk Whalum. He also recorded Flesh and Bone in 1995 with his daughter, Hillary James, and another solo album, Joy Ride (Warner Bros., 1999). Joined at the Hip was reissued with a 2019 Remaster on evosound.

=== Fourplay ===
James was looking for a bass player while recording the album Grand Piano Canyon (Warner Bros., 1990) with drummer Harvey Mason and guitarist Lee Ritenour. Mason and Ritenour suggested Nathan East. After working with them for a while, James suggested they form a band, which resulted in the contemporary jazz quartet Fourplay. The band recorded over ten albums and saw a couple of personnel changes, with guitarist Larry Carlton replacing Ritenour and then Chuck Loeb replacing Carlton. Fourplay celebrated its 25th anniversary with the album Silver (Heads Up, 2015).

=== Influence in hip hop ===
James's music, especially his early albums, has been sampled often, with his songs "Nautilus" and "Take Me to the Mardi Gras" leading the field.

==== Selected songs that use James’s music ====
"Nautilus" was sampled by Eric B. & Rakim in "Let the Rhythm Hit 'em", Run-D.M.C.'s "Beats to the Rhyme", Ghostface Killah's "Daytona 500", DJ Jazzy Jeff's "Jazzie's Groove", Jeru the Damaja's "My Mind Spray", Freddie Gibbs's "Extradite", and "Farandole (L'Arlesienne Suite No. 2)". It appears on the Funcrusher Plus LP from Company Flow and Nangdo's "Nikes". The bassline from "Nautilus" appears in "Children's Story" by Slick Rick.

"Take Me to the Mardi Gras" incorporates in its first four measures a bell-and-drum pattern that is one of hip hop's basic break beats. It was sampled by Crash Crew's "Breaking Bells (Take Me to the Mardi Gras)", Run-D.M.C.'s "Peter Piper", the Beastie Boys' "Hold it Now, Hit it", Missy Elliott's "Work It", will.i.am's "I Got it from My Mama", "This Is Me (Urban Remix)" by Dream, "I Want You" by Common, and "Take It Back" by Wu-Tang Clan.

"Westchester Lady" was sampled by DJ Jazzy Jeff & the Fresh Prince in "Here We Go Again", as well as by DJ T-Rock and Squashy Nice in their song "Evolution".

James's 1981 song "Sign of the Times" was sampled by De La Soul in its 1991 single "Keepin' the Faith" from the album De La Soul is Dead and Warren G and Nate Dogg as par of their 1994 single "Regulate".

His 1980 song "Snowbird Fantasy" was sampled by French house musician and Le Knight Club member Eric Chedeville, also Known as Rico the Wizard, as part of his 2009 single "Spell of Love", which was remixed later by DJ Sneak.

The track "Tappan Zee", named after the bridge over a wide section of the Hudson River that James regularly crossed on his way to the studio, was sampled as part of Arrested Development's "People Everyday (Metamorphis Remix)".

Digable Planets song “Jettin’” contains a sample from the song "Blue Lick".

In the past, James has stated that he had "a lot of respect" for the creative process of hip hop production and recognizes the use of samples to create something new, and was only unhappy when his music was plagiarized or illegally sampled. James has begun to sample his own music, as shown on the composition "Submarine". He has also been collaborating in recent years with DJ Jazzy Jeff, Ghostface Killah, 9th Wonder, and Slick Rick.

== Awards and honors ==
- Grammy Award for Best Pop Instrumental Performance, with Earl Klugh, One on One (1979)
- Grammy Award for Best Jazz Fusion Performance, Vocal or Instrumental, with David Sanborn, Double Vision (1986)
- Grammy nomination, Cool with Earl Klugh (1992)
- Grammy nomination, Joined at the Hip with Kirk Whalum (1996)
- Grammy nomination, Joyride (1999)
- George Benson Lifetime Achievement Award (2006)
- Grammy nomination for Best Pop Instrumental, "Fortune Teller" by Fourplay (2008)
- International Achievement Award, State of Michigan (2008)
- Best Group of the Year nomination, American Smooth Jazz Awards, Fourplay (2010)
- Grammy nomination for Best Arrangement, Instrumental or A Cappella, "Ghost of a Chance" (2016)
- Grammy nomination for Best Contemporary Instrumental Album, "Just Us".

== Discography ==
The discography of Bob James includes 53 albums.

=== Studio albums ===
Year	Album	Peak chart positions										Label
Year	Album	US 200	US Top Sales	US Jazz	US Con. Jazz	US R&B /HH	US Trad Jazz	US Top Cur	US Ind	US Indie Store	US Vinyl	Label
1963	Bold Conceptions	—	—	—	—	—	—	—	—	—	—	Mercury
1965	Explosions	—	—	—	—	—	—	—	—	—	—	ESP Disk
1974	One	85	—	—	—	48	—	—	—	—	—	CTI
1975	Two	75	—	—	—	28	—	—	—	—	—	CTI
1976	Three	49	—	—	—	23	—	—	—	—	—	CTI
1977	BJ4	38	—	—	—	33	—	—	—	—	—	CTI
1977	Heads	47	—	—	—	—	—	—	—	—	—	Tappan Zee/Columbia
1978	Touchdown	37	—	—	—	—	—	—	—	—	—	Tappan Zee/Columbia
1979	Lucky Seven	42	—	—	—	—	—	—	—	—	—	Tappan Zee/Columbia
1979	One on One (Bob James with Earl Klugh)	23	—	—	—	26	—	—	—	—	—	Tappan Zee/Columbia
1980	H	47	—	—	—	—	—	—	—	—	—	Tappan Zee/Columbia
1981	Sign of the Times	56	—	—	—	27	—	—	—	—	—	Tappan Zee/Columbia
1982	Hands Down	72	—	—	—	—	—	—	—	—	—	Tappan Zee/Columbia
1982	Two of a Kind (Bob James with Earl Klugh)	—	—	—	—	—	37	—	—	—	—	Capitol
1983	The Genie: Themes & Variations from the TV Series "Taxi" – ("Angela")	77	—	—	—	43	47	—	—	—	—	Tappan Zee/Columbia
1983	Foxie	106	—	—	—	45	3	108	—	—	—	Tappan Zee/Columbia
1984	Rameau	—	—	—	—	—	—	—	—	—	—	CBS Masterworks
1984	12	136	—	—	—	67	5	136	—	—	—	Tappan Zee/Columbia
1984	The Swan	—	—	—	—	—	—	—	—	—	—	Tappan Zee/CBS/Sony [JPN]
1986	Double Vision (Bob James with David Sanborn)	50	—	—	—	—	—	—	—	—	—	Warner Bros.
1986	Obsession	142	—	—	8	49	3	142	—	—	—	Warner Bros.
1988	The Scarlatti Dialogues	—	—	—	—	—	—	—	—	—	—	CBS Masterworks
1988	Ivory Coast	196	—	—	4	99	—	196	—	—	—	Warner Bros.
1989	Concertos for Two & Three Keyboards (Bob James with Güher Pekinel)	—	—	—	—	—	—	—	—	—	—	CBS Masterworks
1990	Grand Piano Canyon	—	—	—	4	—	—	—	—	—	—	Warner Bros.
1992	Cool (Bob James with Earl Klugh)	170	170	—	1	88	—	170	—	—	—	Warner Bros.
1994	Restless	168	168	4	4	—	—	168	—	—	—	Warner Bros.
1995	Flesh and Blood (Bob James with Hilary James)	—	—	—	—	—	—	—	—	—	—	Warner Bros.
1996	Straight Up – (Bob James Trio)	—	—	20	—	—	6	—	—	—	—	Warner Bros.
1996	Joined at the Hip (Bob James with Kirk Whalum)	—	—	11	10	—	—	—	—	—	—	Warner Bros.
1997	Playin' Hooky	—	—	5	4	—	—	—	—	—	—	Warner Bros.
1999	Joy Ride	—	—	10	7	—	—	—	—	—	—	Warner Bros.
2001	Dancing on the Water	—	—	22	—	—	12	—	—	—	—	Warner Bros.
2002	Morning, Noon & Night	—	—	14	10	—	—	—	—	—	—	Warner Bros.
2004	Portrait of Bill Evans – [2 tracks]	—	—	—	—	—	—	—	—	—	—	JVC
2004	Take It from the Top – (Bob James Trio)	—	—	46	—	—	17	—	—	—	—	Koch
2006	Urban Flamingo	—	—	18	7	—	—	—	—	—	—	Koch
2007	Angels of Shanghai (Bob James with Jack Lee)	—	—	24	10	—	—	—	—	—	—	Koch
2007	Ataraxis (Bob James with Deeyah)	—	—	—	—	—	—	—	—	—	—	Koch
2008	Christmas Eyes (Bob James with Hilary James)	—	—	—	—	—	—	—	—	—	—	Koch
2009	Botero (Bob James with Jack Lee)	—	—	—	—	—	—	—	—	—	—	VideoArts [JPN]
2011	Just Friends (Bob James with Howard Paul)	—	—	—	—	—	—	—	—	—	—	BJHP Music
2011	Altair & Vega (Bob James with Keiko Matsui)	—	—	17	7	—	—	—	—	—	—	eOne Music
2013	Quartette Humaine (Bob James with David Sanborn)	—	—	5	—	—	2	—	—	—	—	OKeh/Sony Masterworks
2013	Alone: Kaleidoscope by Solo Piano	—	—	—	—	—	—	—	—	—	—	Red River
2015	The New Cool (Bob James with Nathan East)	—	—	5	2	—	—	—	—	—	—	Yamaha
2015	Live at Milliken Auditorium	—	—	—	—	—	—	—	—	—	—	Tappan Zee
2017	In the Chapel In the Moonlight (Bob James with Nancy Stagnitta)	—	—	—	—	—	—	—	—	—	—	Tappan Zee
2018	Espresso – (Bob James Trio)	—	—	2	—	—	2	—	46	—	—	Evosound
2020	Once Upon a Time: The Lost 1965 New York Studio Sessions	—	—	8	—	—	6	71	—	—	—	Resonance
2020	On Vacation (Bob James with Till Brönner)	—	—	—	—	—	—	—	—	—	—	Sony Masterworks
2020	Stonebone (J & K with George Benson, Herbie Hancock, Bob James, Ron Carter, Grady Tate and Ross Tompkins)	—	37	6	1	—	—	31	—	11	15	A&M/CTI
2022	Feel Like Making Live! (Bob James with Billy Kilson and Michael Palazzolo) – (i.e. Bob James Trio)	—	—	—	14	—	—	—	—	—	—	Evosound
2023	Jazz Hands	—	—	—	—	—	—	—	—	—	—	Evosound
2025	Just Us (Bob James and Dave Koz)	—	—	—	7	—	—	—	—	—	—	Just Koz
"—" denotes a recording that did not chart.

=== Live albums ===
Year	Album	Peak chart positions	Label
Year	Album	US 200	Label
1981	All Around the Town – (live double-album)	66	Tappan Zee/Columbia

=== Compilation albums ===
Year	Album	Label
2001	Anthology	Castle
2001	Restoration	Warner Bros.
2002	The Essential Jazz Collection	Metro Doubles
2003	Bob James in Hi Fi	Audio Fidelity
2009	The Very Best of Bob James	Salvo

=== Singles ===
Year	Title	Peak chart positions					Album
Year	Title	Hot 100	Hot R&B/ Hip-Hop Songs	R&B/ Hip-Hop Airplay	Smooth Jazz Airplay	Adult R&B Airplay	Album
1974	"Night on Bald Mountain"	—	—	—	—N/a	—N/a	One
1974	"In the Garden"	—	—	—	—N/a	—N/a	One
1974	"Feel Like Making Love"	88	—	—	—N/a	—N/a	One
1975	"I Feel a Song (In My Heart)"	105	—	—	—N/a	—N/a	Two
1976	"Westchester Lady"	—	—	—	—N/a	—N/a	Three
1977	"Where the Wind Blows Free"	—	—	—	—N/a	—N/a	BJ4
1977	"Heads"	—	—	—	—N/a	—N/a	Heads
1978	"Night Crawler"	—	—	—	—N/a	—N/a	Heads
1978	"Take Me to the Mardi Gras" – (Japan-only release)	—	—	—	—N/a	—N/a	Two
1979	"Theme from Taxi (Angela)"	—	—	—	—N/a	—N/a	Touchdown
1979	"Touchdown"	—	—	—	—N/a	—N/a	Touchdown
1979	"Friends"	—	—	—	—N/a	—N/a	Lucky Seven
1979	"Kari"	—	—	—	—N/a	—N/a	One on One
1979	"Main Theme from Star Trek – The Motion Picture"	—	—	—	—N/a	—N/a	Non-album single
1980	"Snowbird Fantasy"	—	—	—	—N/a	—N/a	H
1980	"Sparkling New York" – (Japan-only release)	—	—	—	—N/a	—N/a	H – (Japanese edition)
1981	"Sign of the Times"	—	—	—	—N/a	—N/a	Sign of the Times
1981	"The Steamin' Feelin' "	—	—	—	—N/a	—N/a	Sign of the Times
1982	"Spunky"	—	—	—	—N/a	—N/a	Hands Down
1982	"Whiplash"	—	—	—	—N/a	—N/a	Two of a Kind
1982	"Shepherds Song (from Haute-Auvergne) – (UK-only release)	—	—	—	—N/a	—N/a	Reflections – (Various Artists)
1983	"Marco Polo" – (Japan-only release)	—	—	—	—N/a	—N/a	Foxie
1984	"Courtship"	—	—	—	—N/a	—N/a	12
1986	"Maputo"	—	—	—	—N/a	—N/a	Double Vision
1987	"Rousseau"	—	—	—	—N/a	—N/a	Obsession
1987	"3 A.M."	—	—	—	—N/a	—N/a	Obsession
1988	"Ashanti"	—	—	—	—N/a	—N/a	Ivory Coast
1998	"Do It Again" (Bob James featuring Rasheeda Azar)	—	—	—	—N/a	35	Playin' Hooky
1998	"I'm Only Human" (Luther Vandross featuring Cassandra Wilson and Bob James)	—	57	42	—N/a	10	Luther Vandross – I Know
2012	"Backstage Pass" (Paul Brown featuring Bob James)	—	—	—	1	—	Paul Brown – The Funky Joint
2013	"Deep in the Weeds" (Bob James and David Sanborn)	—	—	—	1	—	Quartette Humaine
2015	"Sign of the Times" (CeeLo and Bob James)	—	—	—	—	17	CeeLo – Heart Blanche
2018	"Submarine"	—	—	—	4	—	Espresso
2019	"Topside" (Bob James Trio)	—	—	—	1	—	Espresso
2020	"Nautilus" (remix) / "Submarine" (remix)	—	—	—	—	—	Non-album single
2021	"Hope for Tomorrow" (Tom Braxton featuring Bob James)	—	—	—	15	—	Tom Braxton – Lookin' Up
2021	"Hispanica" (Christian de Mesones featuring Bob James)	—	—	—	1	—	Christian de Mesones – They Call Me Big New York
2023	"The Secret Drawer"	—	—	—	4	—	Jazz Hands
2025	"New Hope" (Bob James and Dave Koz)	—	—	—	17	—	Just Us
"—" denotes a recording that did not chart.

=== With Fourplay ===
- Fourplay (Warner Bros., 1991) – rec. 1990–91
- Between the Sheets (Warner Bros., 1993)
- Elixir (Warner Bros., 1995)
- 4 (Warner Bros., 1998)
- Snowbound (Warner Bros., 1999)
- Yes, Please! (Warner Bros., 2000)
- Heartfelt (Bluebird/RCA Victor/BMG, 2002)
- Journey (Bluebird/RCA Victor/BMG, 2004)
- X (Bluebird/RCA Victor/BMG, 2006)
- Energy (Heads Up, 2008)
- Let's Touch the Sky (Heads Up, 2010)
- Esprit De Four (Heads Up, 2012)
- Silver (Heads Up, 2015)

=== As sideman ===
With Patti Austin

- Every Home Should Have One (Qwest, 1981)
- That Secret Place (GRP, 1994)

With Chet Baker

- Baby Breeze (Limelight, 1964)
- I/We Had a Ball (Limelight, 1965) – rec. 1964–65
- She Was Too Good to Me (CTI, 1974)
- Carnegie Hall Concert (CTI, 1975) – live rec. 1974

With George Benson

- The Other Side of Abbey Road (A&M, 1970)
- Love Remembers (Warner Bros., 1993)

With Alessandro Bertozzi

- Talkin'back (Level49, 2003)

With Ron Carter

- Blues Farm (CTI, 1973)
- Empire Jazz (RSO, 1980)

With Hank Crawford

- We Got a Good Thing Going (Kudu, 1972)
- Don't You Worry 'Bout a Thing (Kudu, 1974)

With Maynard Ferguson

- Primal Scream (Columbia, 1976)
- Conquistador (Columbia, 1977)

With Michael Franks

- Abandoned Garden (Warner Bros., 1995)
- Barefoot on the Beach (Windham Hill, 1999)

With Eric Gale

- Forecast (Kudu, 1973)
- Ginseng Woman (Columbia, 1977)
- Multiplication (Columbia, 1977)
- Island Breeze (Elektra Musician, 1983)

With Jeff Golub and Avenue Blue

- Naked City (Bluemoon Mesa, 1996)
- Nightlife (Bluemoon Mesa, 1997)

With Quincy Jones

- Walking in Space (A&M, 1969)
- Gula Matari (A&M, 1970)
- Smackwater Jack (A&M, 1971)
- You've Got It Bad Girl (A&M, 1973)
- Body Heat (A&M, 1974)
- I Heard That!! (A&M, 1976)[2LP] – rec. 1969–76

With Hubert Laws

- Crying Song (CTI, 1969)
- Afro-Classic (CTI, 1970)
- Morning Star (CTI, 1972)
- The Rite of Spring (CTI, 1972)
- Carnegie Hall (CTI, 1973)
- In the Beginning (CTI, 1974)
- Then There Was Light (CTI, 1974)
- The Chicago Theme (CTI, 1975)
- Romeo & Juliet (Columbia, 1976)
- The San Francisco Concert (CTI, 1977)

With Harvey Mason

- Funk in a Mason Jar (Arista, 1977)
- Groovin' You (Arista, 1979)
- Stone Mason (Alfa, 1982)
- Ratamacue (Atlantic, 1996)
- Chameleon (Columbia, 2014)

With Ralph MacDonald

- Sound of a Drum (Marlin, 1976)
- The Path (Marlin, 1978)

With Idris Muhammad

- Power of Soul (Kudu, 1974)
- My Turn (Lipstick, 1991)

With Doc Powell

- Inner City Blues (101 South, 1995)
- Life Changes (Gold Circle, 2001)

With Lee Ritenour

- Festival (GRP, 1988)
- Wes Bound (GRP, 1993)
- This Is Love (i.e. Music/Polygram, 1998)

With Gabor Szabo

- Mizrab (CTI, 1973)
- Rambler (CTI, 1974)
- Macho (Salvation, 1975)

With Stanley Turrentine

- Cherry (CTI, 1972)
- Don't Mess with Mister T. (CTI, 1973)
- The Baddest Turrentine (CTI, 1973)
- The Sugar Man (CTI, 1979)

With Grover Washington Jr.

- Inner City Blues (Kudu, 1971)
- All the King's Horses (Kudu, 1972)
- Soul Box (Kudu, 1973)
- Feels So Good (Kudu, 1975)
- Mister Magic (Kudu, 1975)

With Kirk Whalum

- Floppy Disk (Tappan Zee/Columbia, 1985)
- And You Know That (Columbia, 1988)
- The Promise (Columbia, 1989)
- Caché (Columbia, 1993)

With John Zorn

- The Big Gundown (Nonesuch, 1986)
- Cobra (Hat Hut, 1987)
- Spillane (Nonesuch, 1987)

With others

- Amerie, Because I Love It (Columbia, 2007)
- Randy Bernsen, Music for Planets, People & Washing Machines (Zebra/MCA, 1985)
- Blood, Sweat & Tears, More Than Ever (Columbia, 1976)
- Chris Botti, Slowing Down the World (GRP, 1999)
- Eddie Brigati, Lost in the Wilderness (Elektra, 1976)
- Gary Burton, Cool Nights (GRP, 1991)
- Karen Carpenter, Karen Carpenter (A&M, 1996) – rec. 1979–80
- The Carpenters, Lovelines (A&M, 1989) – rec. 1978–80
- David Chesky, Rush Hour (Columbia, 1980)
- Merry Clayton, Keep Your Eye On the Sparrow (Ode, 1975)
- Natalie Cole, Stardust (Elektra, 1996)
- Eddie Daniels, Beautiful Love (Shanachie, 1997)
- Eumir Deodato & Airto Moreira, In Concert (CTI, 1974)
- Paul Desmond, Skylark (CTI, 1974)
- Neil Diamond, Beautiful Noise (Columbia, 1976)
- Eric Dolphy, Other Aspects (Blue Note, 1987)
- Nathan East, Nathan East (Yamaha, 2014)
- Bill Evans, Push (Lipstick, 1994)
- Fania All-Stars, Rhythm Machine (Fania, 1977)
- Sam Franz, 2080 (Eight Islands, 2022)
- Roberta Flack, Feel Like Makin' Love (Atlantic, 1975)
- Aretha Franklin, Let Me in Your Life (Atlantic, 1974)
- Russ Freeman, Holiday (GRP, 1995)
- Johnny "Hammond" Smith, Higher Ground (Kudu, 1974)
- Terumasa Hino, Daydream (Flying Disk, 1980)
- Freddie Hubbard, Windjammer (Columbia, 1976)
- Jackie and Roy, Time & Love (CTI, 1972)
- Boney James & Rick Braun, Shake It Up (Warner Bros., 2000)
- Jazz Corners All Stars feat. Bob James (GMM Grammy, 2010)
- J. J. Johnson & Kai Winding, Stonebone (A&M, 1970)
- Steve Khan, Tightrope (Tappan Zee/Columbia, 1977)
- Steve Khan, The Blue Man (Tappan Zee/Columbia, 1978)
- Morgana King, New Beginnings (Paramount, 1973)
- Dave Koz, A New Day (Just Koz Entertainment, 2020)
- Chuck Loeb, The Moon, the Stars and the Setting Sun (Shanachie, 1998)
- Kenny Loggins, Celebrate Me Home (Columbia, 1977)
- Kevin Mahogany, My Romance (Warner Bros., 1998)
- Keiko Matsui, Whisper from the Mirror (Countdown/Unity, 2000)
- Amanda McBroom, Midnight Matinee (Analogue, 1991)
- Gene McDaniels, Natural Juices (Ode, 1975)
- Michael McDonald, Motown (Motown, 2003)
- Dave McMurray, Peace of Mind (Hip Bop, 1999)
- Melba Moore, Peach Melba (Buddah, 1975)
- Gerry Mulligan & Chet Baker, Carnegie Hall Concert (CTI, 1975)
- Esther Phillips, Performance (Kudu, 1974)
- The Rippingtons, Life in the Tropics (Peak, 2000)
- Luis Salinas, Rosario (Universal, 2001)
- Mongo Santamaria, Red Hot (Tappan Zee/Columbia, 1979)
- Marilyn Scott, Take Me with You (Warner Bros., 1996)
- Tom Scott, New York Connection (Ode, 1975)
- Don Sebesky, Giant Box (CTI, 1973)
- Paul Simon, There Goes Rhymin' Simon (Columbia, 1973)
- Paul Simon, Still Crazy After All These Years (Columbia, 1975)
- Frank Sinatra, L.A. Is My Lady (Qwest/WB, 1984)
- Phoebe Snow, Phoebe Snow (Shelter, 1974)
- Chris Standring, Sunlight (Ultimate Vibe, 2018)
- Wayman Tisdale, Way Up! (Platinum/Rendezvous 2007)
- John Tropea, Something Old New Borrowed and Blues (VideoArts [jp], 1999)
- Phil Upchurch, Upchurch/Tennyson (Kudu, 1975)
- Luther Vandross, I Know (Virgin, 1998)
- Sarah Vaughan, Vol. 1: Night Song (Mercury, 1964)
- Dionne Warwick, Friends Can Be Lovers (Arista, 1993)
- Peter White, Playin' Favorites (Columbia, 2006) – live
- Alexander Zonjic, Romance with You (Inner City, 1988)

== Filmography ==
- 2005 Live at Montreux
- 2005 Bob James: An Evening of Fourplay Vol 1 & 2
- 2006 Bob James Live
