= Gary King (bass player) =

American jazz bassist

- Born: September 5, 1947; Middletown, Orange County, New York
- Died: July 23, 2003 (aged 55) Bushkill, Pennsylvania
- Genre: Jazz
- Occupation: Musician
- Instruments: Upright bass, Electric bass
- Years active: 1970s–2000s

Gary W King (September 5, 1947 – July 23, 2003) was an American jazz bassist, songwriter, composer, and arranger. He was born in Middletown, New York.

King appeared on many albums released by CTI Records, especially those by Bob James, and later on James' own album label, Tappan Zee Records. He also played bass on a number of albums by Gato Barbieri, Roberta Flack, Grover Washington Jr., and on The Jacksons' album Destiny, notably the track "Blame It on the Boogie".

== Discography ==
With Gato Barbieri

- Caliente! (A&M 1976)
- Ruby Ruby (A&M, 1977)
- Passion and Fire (A&M 1984)

With Kenny Barron

- Innocence (Wolf, 1978)

With George Benson

- Bodytalk (CTI, 1973)
- Pacific Fire (CTI, 1983)
- Benson & Farrell (CTI, 1976)

With Luiz Bonfá

- Manhattan Strut (Paddle Wheel, 1974)

With John Blair

- We Belong Together (CTI, 1977)

With Merry Clayton

- Keep Your Eye on the Sparrow (Ode, 1975)

With Marc Colby

- Serpentine Fire (Tappan Zee, 1978)
- One Good Turn (Columbia, 1979)

With Hank Crawford

- Don't You Worry 'Bout a Thing (Kudu, 1975)
- I Hear a Symphony (Kudu, 1975)
- Hank Crawford's Back (Kudu, 1976)
- Tico Rico (Kudu, 1977)

With Maynard Ferguson

- Prima Scream (Columbia, 1976)
- Conquistador (Columbia, 1977)

With Roberta Flack

- Feel Like Making Love (Atlantic, 1975)
- Blue Lights in the Basement (Atlantic, 1977)

With Sonny Fortune

- Serengeti Minstrel (Atlantic, 1977)

With Ronnie Foster

- Cheshire Cat (Blue Note, 1975)

With Eric Gale

- Ginseng Woman (CBS, 1976)

With Jim Hall

- Concierto / Big Blues / Studio Trieste (BGO, 2018)

With Roland Hanna

- Gershwin Carmichael Cats (CTI, 1982)

With The Jacksons

- Destiny (Epic CBS, 1978)

With Bob James

- One (Columbia, 1974)
- Two (Columbia, 1975)
- Three (Columbia, 1976)
- BJ4 (Columbia, 1977)
- Heads (Tappan Zee, 1977)
- Touchdown (Columbia, 1978)
- Lucky Seven (Columbia, 1979)
- H (Tappan Zee, 1980)
- Hands Down (Columbia CBS, 1982)
- The Genie (Columbia, 1983)
- Ivory Coast (Warner Bros, 1988)

With Roger Kellaway Featuring Houston Person

- Creation (Greenestreet, 1984)

With Earl Klugh

- Crazy for You (Liberty, 1981)

With Earl Klugh and Bob James

- One on One (Columbia, 1979)
- Two of a Kind (Blue Note, 1982)

With Yusef Lateef with Art Farmer

- Autophysiopsychic (CTI, 1978)

With Gladys Knight & The Pips

- 2nd Anniversary (Buddah, 1975)

With Hubert Laws

- Romeo and Juliet (Columbia, 1976)
- The San Francisco Concert (CTI, 1977)

With Wilbert Longmire

- Champagne (CBS, 1979)
- Sunny Side Up (CBS, 1979)

L With Idris Muhammad

- Power of Soul (Kudu, 1974)

With David Matthews

- Dune (CTI, 1977)

With Eric Mercury & Roberta Flack

- Our Love Will Stop the World (Atlantic, 1983)

With Gene McDaniels

- Headless Heroes of the Apocolypse (Atlantic, 1971)

With Alphonse Mouzon

- Funky Snakefoot (Blue Note, 1974)

With Idris Muhammad

- Power of Soul (Kudu, 1974)

With Jimmy Owens

- Headin' Home (A&M/Horizon, 1978)

With Esther Phillips

- Performance (Kudu, 1974)
- For All We Know (Kudu, 1976)

With Mongo Santamaría

- Red Hot (Columbia, 1979)

With Tom Scott

- New York Connection (Ode, 1975)
- Blow it Out (Ode, 1977)
- Intimate Strangers (Columbia, 1978)

With Nina Simone

- Baltimore (CTI, 1978)

With Jeremy Steig

- Firefly (CTI, 1977)

With Stanley Turrentine

- Nightwings (Fantasy, 1977)
- Westside Highway (Fantasy, 1978)

With Luther Vandross

- Never Too Much (Epic, 1981)

With Grover Washington Jr.

- Mister Magic (Kudu, 1975)
- Feels so Good (Kudu, 1975)

With Kirk Whalum

- And You Know That! (Columbia, 1988)

With Lenny Williams

- Pray for the Lion (Warner Bros, 1974)

With Lenny White

- Big City (Nemperor, 1977)

With Paul Winter & Paul Halley

- Whales Alive (Living, 1987)
