= Leonard Gibbs (musician) =

American musician (1948–2021)

Doc Gibbs
- Gibbs in 2015

Background information
- Born: Leonard William Gibbs Jr. November 8, 1948; Philadelphia, Pennsylvania, U.S.
- Died: September 15, 2021 (aged 72) Salem, Oregon, U.S.

Leonard William Gibbs Jr. (November 8, 1948 – September 15, 2021), also known as Doc Gibbs, was an American percussionist. Gibbs studied at the Pennsylvania Academy of Fine Arts in the early 1970s. He toured with Anita Baker, Whitney Houston, Bob James, Ricki Lee Jones, Al Jarreau, Grover Washington, Jr., Wyclef Jean, Erykah Badu, Eric Bennett, and James Poyser. He acquired the nickname "Doc" after suggesting herbal remedies to jazz saxophonist Grover Washington, Jr.

He headed the house band on the Food Network television show Emeril Live hosted by Emeril Lagasse, from its beginning in 1997 until it was cancelled in December 2007.

Gibbs died from prostate cancer in Salem, Oregon, on September 15, 2021, at the age of 72.
