= Oberheim Polyphonic Synthesizer =

Polyphonic analogue synthesizer

Polyphonic Synthesizer
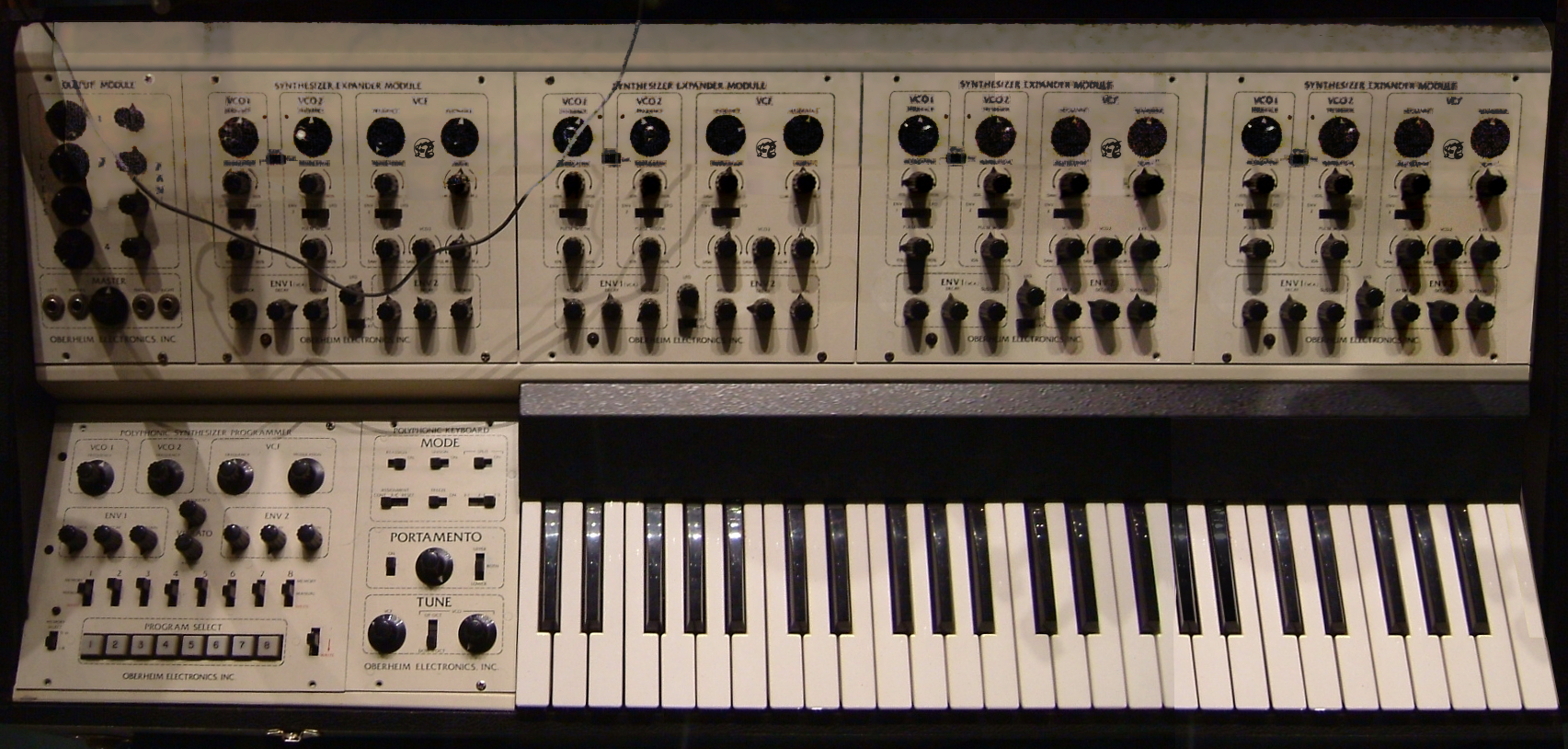
- Four Voice (FVS-1)
- Manufacturer: Oberheim Electronics
- Dates: 1975–79
- Price: Four Voice: US$4,295 ($5,690 with programmer); Eight Voice: US$7,790 ($10,185 with programmer)

Technical specifications
- Polyphony: 4 voice (FVS), 8 voice (EVS)
- Timbrality: Multitimbral
- Oscillator: 2 VCOs per voice with sawtooth or variable-pulse waveforms
- LFO: 1 with triangle wave
- Synthesis type: Analog Subtractive
- Filter: Low, band, high, notch filter w/ resonance
- Attenuator: 2 x ADR envelopes
- Aftertouch expression: No
- Velocity expression: No
- Storage memory: 16 patches with PSP-1 programmer
- Effects: None

Input/output
- Keyboard: 49-key
- External control: CV/Gate

The Oberheim Polyphonic Synthesizer is a series of analog music synthesizers that was produced from 1975 to 1979 by Oberheim Electronics. Developed by Tom Oberheim, they were the first production synthesizers capable of playing chords.

== Background ==
After Oberheim introduced the DS-2 digital music sequencer, Tom Oberheim recognized that customers wanted to play one synthesizer while the DS-2 played a sequence on another, or layer the sound of one synthesizer with another. To address this need, he introduced the Synthesizer Expander Module (SEM), a semi-modular analog synthesizer module, in 1974. The SEM featured two VCOs and a two-pole voltage-controlled filter that could operate as a low-pass, high-pass, band-pass, or band-reject filter, giving it a different sound from the Moog and ARP four-pole low-pass ladder filters popular at the time.

== Specification ==
In late 1975, after Norlin canceled several large Maestro orders, Oberheim developed a series of polyphonic synthesizers by combining multiple SEMs with a digitally-scanned keyboard developed by Dave Rossum and a two-channel sequencer. By packaging two or four SEMs, each capable of generating one voice (or note), together under keyboard control, he was able to create synthesizers that could play two or four notes simultaneously. These synthesizer models were logically named the Oberheim Oberheim Two Voice (TVS) and Four Voice (FVS).

In 1976, Oberheim introduced the Polyphonic Synthesizer Programmer (PSP-1), an optional module which made possible the storage and recall of most of the SEM's parameters, as well as the ability to glide from one note or chord to another using portamento.

In 1977, the Oberheim Eight Voice (EVS), available with either a single or dual manual keyboard, was added to the series.

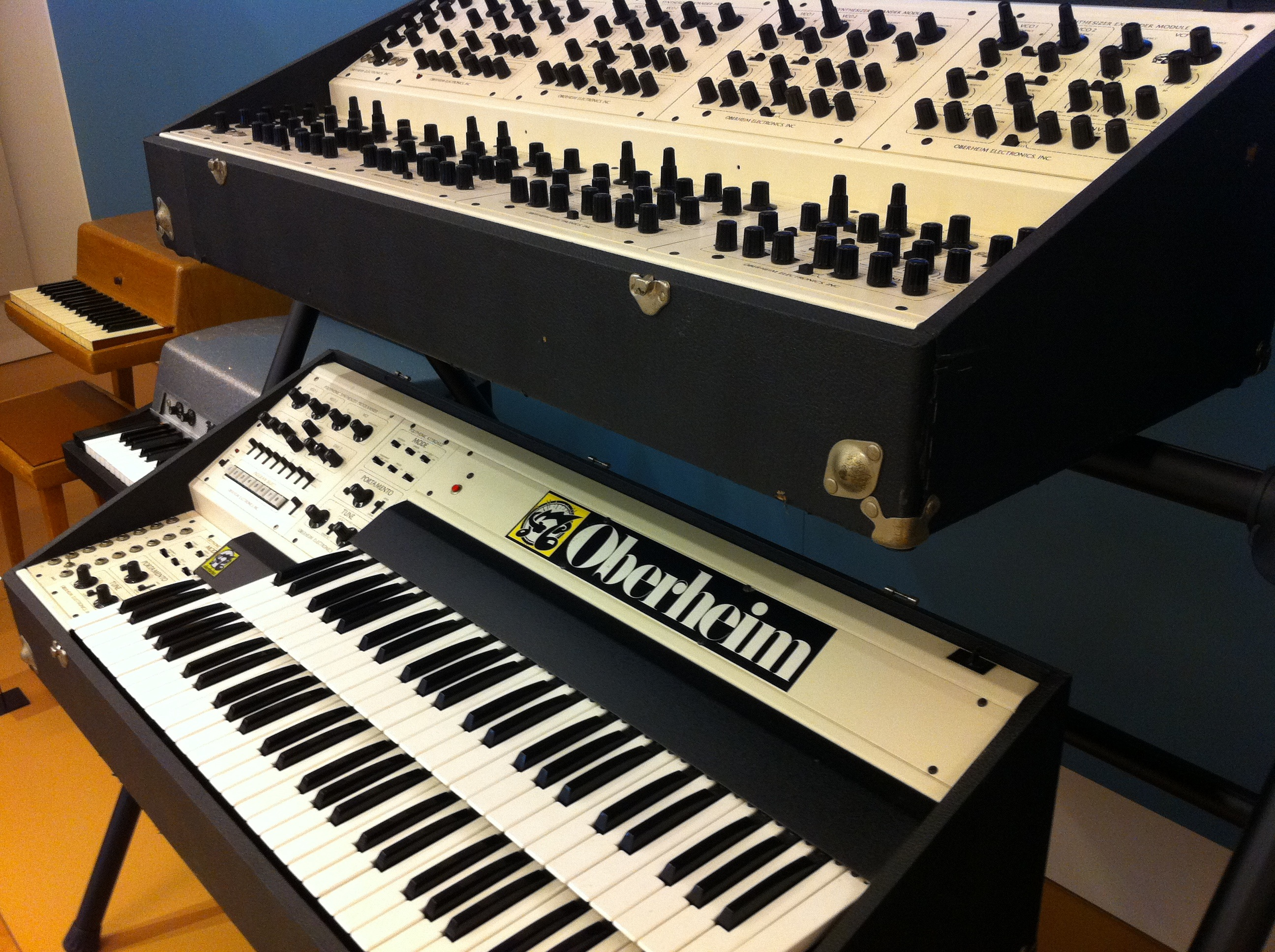
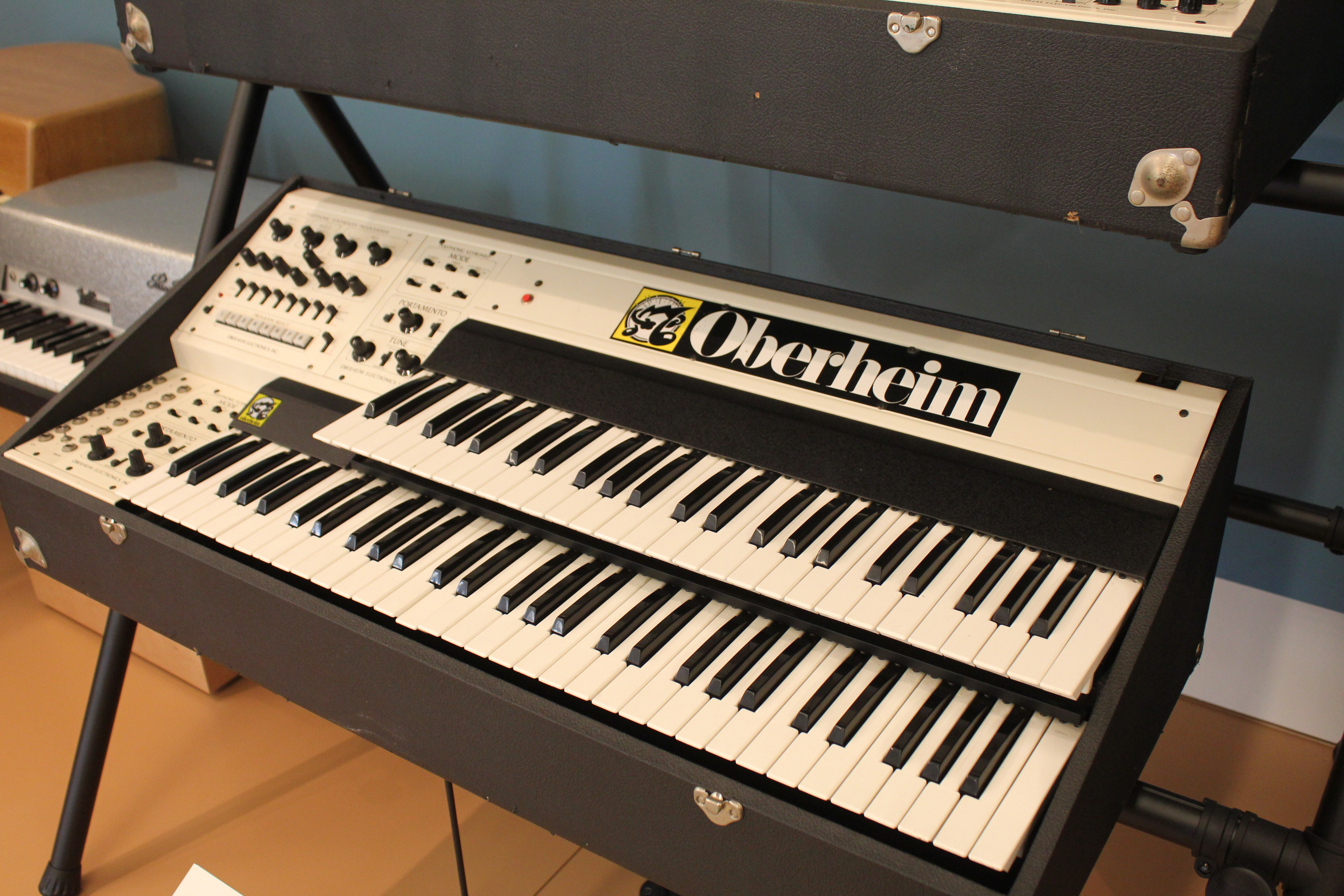
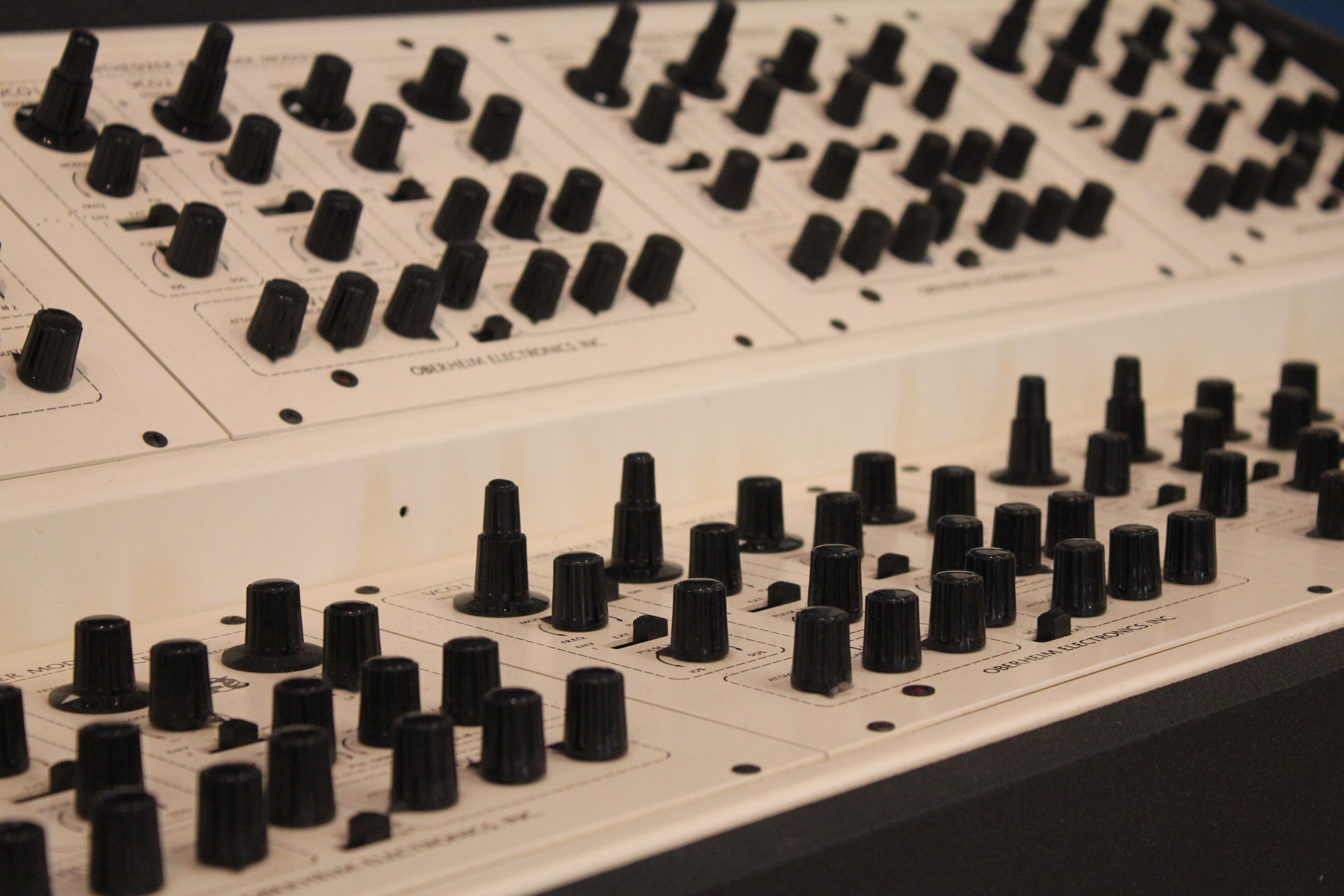
Oberheim Dual Manual Eight Voice (factory custom)
exhibited at Musical Instrument Museum (Phoenix)

The SEM, Two Voice, Four Voice, and Eight Voice were eventually replaced by a series of microprocessor-controlled synthesizers, beginning with the OB-1 and culminating in the OB-X and OB-Xa, which were fully programmable and significantly more compact than their predecessors, which Oberheim discontinued production of in 1979.

Despite their maintenance cost and rarity, Oberheim Polyphonic Synthesizers are still adored by many musicians today for their characteristic sonic 'thickness' and 'depth' caused in part by the random variance between each SEM module.

== Notable users ==
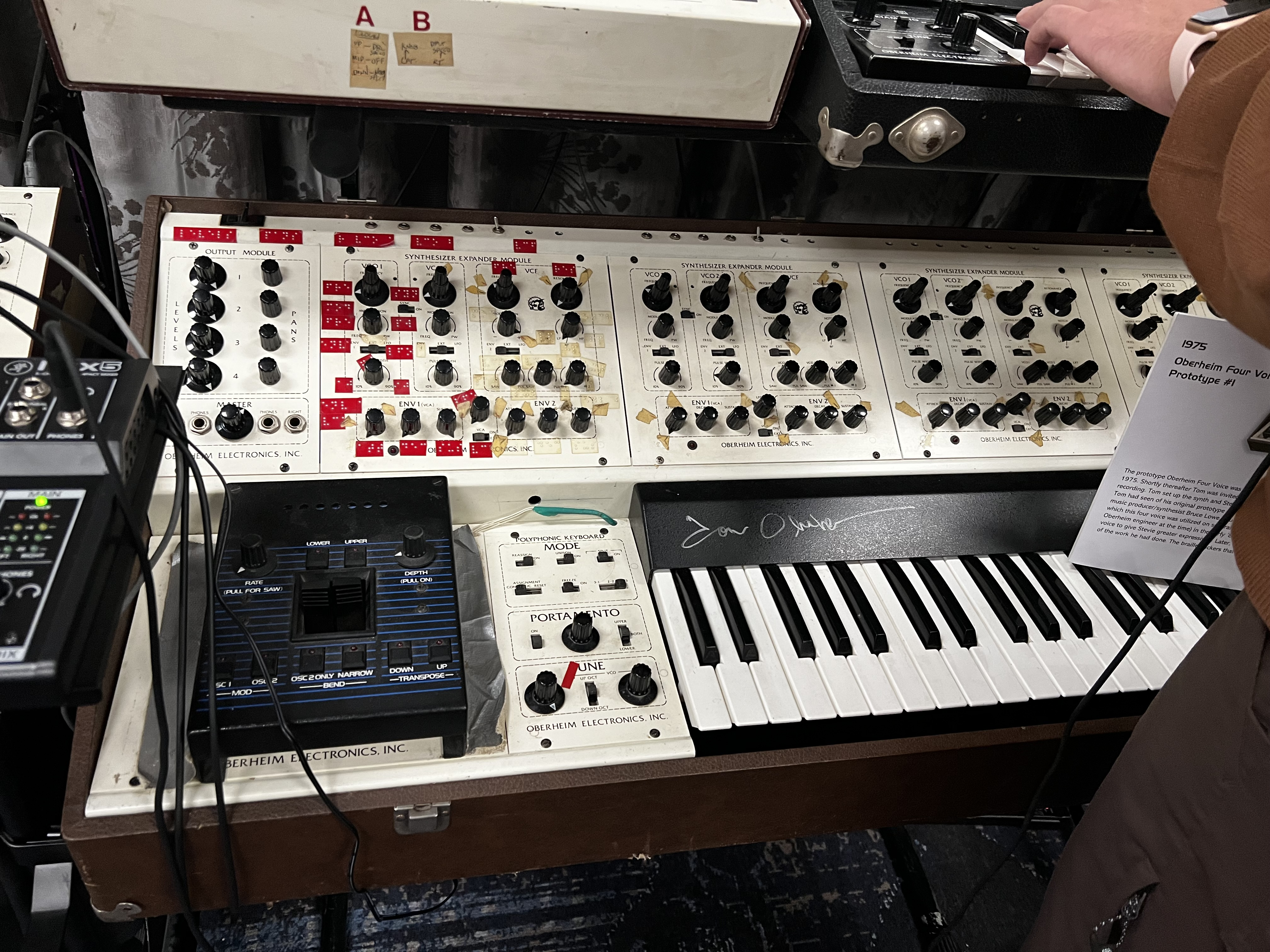
The first prototype of the Oberheim Four Voice, as used by Stevie Wonder. The front panel still shows the braille labeling.

- 808 State
- Akiko Yano
- Bill Payne (Little Feat)
- Blue Weaver (Bee Gees)
- Bob James
- The Brothers Johnson
- Chick Corea
- Christine McVie (Fleetwood Mac)
- Christopher Franke
- Dave Greenfield (The Stranglers)
- Dave Grusin
- Dee Palmer (Jethro Tull)
- Dennis DeYoung (Styx)
- Depeche Mode
- Edgar Froese (Tangerine Dream)
- Eagles
- Gary Wright
- Geddy Lee (Rush)
- George Duke
- Herbie Hancock
- Hideki Matsutake (Yellow Magic Orchestra)
- Jan Hammer
- Jean-Michel Jarre
- Jimmy Jam and Terry Lewis
- Joe Zawinul (Weather Report)
- John Carpenter
- Larry Dunn (Earth, Wind & Fire)
- Laza Ristovski
- Lyle Mays (Pat Metheny Group)
- Michael McDonald (The Doobie Brothers)
- Patrick Moraz
- Paul Kantner (Jefferson Starship)
- Pete Namlook
- Philip Oakey (The Human League)
- Pink Floyd
- Prince
- Rick Davies (Supertramp)
- Rose Royce
- Rufus
- Ryuichi Sakamoto
- Steve Porcaro (Toto)
- Stevie Wonder
- The Shamen
- Tim Simenon (Bomb the Bass)
- Trent Reznor (Nine Inch Nails)
- Vangelis
- Vince Clarke

== Software emulations ==
GForce Software collaborated with Tom Oberheim and former Oberheim engineer Marcus Ryle to develop the GForce Oberheim OB-E, a software synthesizer emulation of the Eight Voice, and the GForce Oberheim SEM emulation of the SEM. The GForce Oberheim OB-E is the first software instrument ever to receive Tom Oberheim's personal endorsement.
