= Emanuel Vardi =

American violist (1915–2011)

- Born: 21 April 1915; Jerusalem, Mandatory Palestine
- Died: 29 January 2011 (aged 95) North Bend, Washington, US
- Genres: Classical, Jazz
- Occupation: Violist
- Instrument: Viola
- Education: Juilliard School, Institute of Musical Art

Emanuel Vardi (21 April 1915 – 29 January 2011), an American violist, was considered to have been one of the great viola players of the 20th century.

== Early life ==
Emanuel Vardi was born April 21, 1915, in Jerusalem. His mother, Anna Joffa Vardi, had a piano studio with many students and started Emanuel on piano at about age 3. His father, Joseph Vardi had a violin studio and also started his son out on his instrument at about the age of 3. The family came to the United States in 1920 via Paris, France, aboard a ship called "the Asia" to escape the pogroms in the Middle East.

He continued studying both piano and violin until about age 7, when he forwent piano to focus on violin. He played Mozart's Fantasy in D-minor at a recital at age 9. The next day the New York Herald Tribune came out with an article by Charles Isaacson where he said, "Keep a lookout for this future pianist".

At age 12, his father found out about the Juilliard School, and filled out a submission form which was accepted. Then when they showed up for the audition, the jury expected his father to play. But his father pointed to Emanuel and said "no, he will be the one playing". They accepted Emanuel, but since the age limit was 16, he was sent to the Institute of Musical Art, where he studied under Constance Seeger, mother of folk singer Pete Seeger.

Around age 14, Constance got him into the private Walden School, since the public schools wouldn't allow him sufficient daily practice time. She arranged for him to have 2 to 3 hours of practice daily. While there he was dubbed Mani by one of his teachers, Mr. Hill.

About age 15, Emanuel dropped out of school for a time as a sort of teenage rebellion and lived with his friend Zack Baratz. Constance noticed he wasn't in school, coaxed him to return to his studies and then he was invited to return to Juilliard.

== Career ==
In 1942, Vardi received the “Recitalist of the Year” award from the New York music critics for the best New York recital following his Town Hall debut.

He had the distinction of being asked to perform a solo recital at the White House for President Franklin D. Roosevelt during World War II.

Vardi is one of one two violists in the world to have ever given a solo recital in Carnegie Hall.

He taught at the Manhattan School of Music and Temple University.

In crossing musical genres of classical and jazz, he toured and performed with jazz greats such as Louis Armstrong and Al Hirt.

In 1955, he was a soloist with the Naumburg Orchestral Concerts, in the Naumburg Bandshell, Central Park, in the summer series.

In the early 1960s, Vardi worked for Audio Fidelity Records in New York as producer.

In 1985, Vardi was featured in a full-length article in The Strad, and in 2003 he was honored with a lengthy interview in the American Viola Society Journal, with his painting “Homage to a Great Violist” appearing on the front cover.

Due to an accident in 1993, Vardi lost the use of his shoulder, forcing him to retire from the viola. After his accident Vardi continued with his painting and art endeavors. Emanuel Vardi died in North Bend, Washington, at the age of 95.

== Compositions ==
- Prelude for cello and piano, Op. 2 No. 1
- Suite on American Folk Songs for viola (or violin) and orchestra (or piano) (1944)

1. The Unconstant Lover
2. I Will and I Must get Married
3. The Wayfaring Stranger
4. On the Banks of the Old Pee Dee

- Modern Sensations, Variations on a Theme by Paganini for trumpet and piano (or band) (1963)
- Themes from the Diary of Anne Frank for optional flute and clarinet and orchestra (1973)
- Suite Based on American Folk Songs for viola and piano (1977)

1. Beginning
2. Song
3. Not So Square Dance
4. Ad lib. and Slow Walk
5. Middle Fiddler in 3/4 Time

- Conceptions in Rhythm, Concerto for violin and orchestra (1978)
