= David Nadien =

American violinist (1926–2014)

- Born: David Nadien; March 12, 1926; Brooklyn, New York, USA
- Died: May 28, 2014 (aged 88) Manhattan, New York, USA
- Genres: Classical
- Occupations: Violinist, pedagogue
- Instrument: Violin
- Years active: 1940-2014

David Nadien (March 12, 1926 – May 28, 2014) was an American virtuoso violinist and violin teacher. He was the concertmaster of the New York Philharmonic from 1966 to 1970. His playing style, characterized by fast vibrato, audible shifting noises, and superb bow control, has been compared to that of Jascha Heifetz.

== Life ==
David Nadien was born in Brooklyn, New York, on March 12, 1926, the son of Russian-Jewish father George Nadien and Dutch-Jewish mother Bertha Zwart. His father was a local boxer who went by the last name "Vanderbilt."

He started learning violin with his father, then entered the Mannes School of Music. He also studied at the Juilliard School. His teachers included Adolfo Betti, Demetrius Constantine Dounis, Adolf Busch and Ivan Galamian. When he was 18, he was drafted into the US Army, and played with the Army Service Forces Orchestra on the recommendation of Philadelphia Orchestra principal bassoonist Sol Schoenbach, who recognized his talents.

He made his first concert appearance with the New York Philharmonic at the age of 14, had his first solo recital at Town Hall a month before his 15th birthday and at the age of 20 won the Leventritt Award judged by a panel that included Arturo Toscanini. Afterwards, he worked mainly as a freelance studio musician, until in 1966 he was invited to audition and was eventually selected by Leonard Bernstein to replace the retiring John Corigliano Sr., the father of the composer John Corigliano, as concertmaster of the New York Philharmonic. Although Nadien had little experience of orchestral playing, Bernstein praised his unusually acute sight-reading skills and called him "an extraordinary violinist." He left the orchestra in 1970 and resumed more lucrative studio work in New York, where he recorded strings for artists such as Bette Midler, Billy Joel, Chaka Khan, Don McLean, Nina Simone, Sinéad O'Connor and Tony Bennett. As a violin teacher, he worked at the Mannes College of Music and taught privately.

In 1986, he was a soloist with the Naumburg Orchestral Concerts, in the Naumburg Bandshell, Central Park, in the summer series.

Nadien owned the "Prince of Orange, Wald, Hoffmann" violin, made by Guarneri del Gesù in about 1743, until he sold it in 1967.

He is well known for his recordings of Parts 1 to 4 of the Suzuki violin method.

He died of pneumonia in New York City aged 88 on May 28, 2014.

== Selected discography ==
- Vivaldi, The Four Seasons – (David Nadien, violin; strings of the Kapp Sinfonietta; Igor Kipnis, harpsichord; Emanuel Vardi, conductor / Sleevenotes by Igor Kipnis – LP 33 rpm, Kapp KCL-9056 – 1960)
- The Virtuoso Violinist – recital: Wieniawski, Scherzo Tarantelle Op.16 / Sarasate, Habanera Op.21 No.2 / Sarasate, Zapateado Op.23 No.2 / Paganini (arr. Kreisler), Caprice No.20 / F.M.Veracini, Largo / Kreisler, Praeludium and Allegro 'in the style of Pugnani' / Paganini, Moto perpetuo Op.11 / Sarasate, Caprice basque Op.24 / Kreisler, Recitative and Scherzo Caprice Op.6 -violin solo- / Vieuxtemps, Regrets Op.40 No.2 / Kreisler, Variations on a Theme by Corelli – (David Nadien, violin; Boris Barere, piano – LP 33 rpm, Kapp KCL-9060 – 1961)
- Humoresque – recital: Dvořák (arr. Kreisler), Humoresque Op.101 No.7 / Massenet (arr. M.P.Marsick), Méditation de Thaïs / Mendelssohn (arr. Heifetz), On Wings of Song Op.34 No.2 / Elgar, Salut d'amour Op.12 / Beethoven (arr. Maud Powell), Minuet in G WoO.10 No.2 / Drdla, Souvenir / Brahms, Waltz Op.39 No.15 / Schubert (arr. Wilhelmj), Ave Maria D.839 / Rubinstein (arr. Auer), Melodie in F Op.3 No.1 / Raff, Cavatina Op.85 No.3 / Schubert (arr. Sitt), Serenade (Ständchen, No.4 from 'Schwanengesang' D.957) – (David Nadien, violin; Boris Barere, piano – LP 33 rpm, Kapp KS-3342 (Kapp KL-1342, mono release) – 1963)
- Franck, Violin Sonata in A / Debussy, Violin Sonata in G / Ravel, Pièce en forme de habanera / Fauré, Berceuse Op.16 – (David Nadien, violin; David Hancock, piano – LP 33 rpm, Monitor MCS2017 – 1958)
- Prokofiev, Sonata for 2 violins Op.56 – (Ruggiero Ricci, violin I; David Nadien, violin II – LP 33 rpm, Decca DL710177 – 1970)
