= James Alan Smith (musician) =

American keyboardist, writer and arranger

- Born: May 30, 1943 (age 83)
- Other names: James Allen Smith; Jimmy Smith
- Occupations: Keyboardist; writer; arranger; producer
- Musical career
- Genres: R&B; soul; funk; jazz
- Instruments: Keyboards; piano; organ; clavinet; synthesizer

James Alan Smith, also credited as James Allen Smith and known as Jimmy Smith, is an American keyboardist, writer and arranger whose work includes recordings and performances with Robert Palmer, Betty Davis, King Curtis and Stuff.

== Career ==
Smith came from a jazz, vocal music and R&B background. His work included performances with King Curtis, Aretha Franklin, Ben E. King, Wilson Pickett, Harry Belafonte and The Persuasions.

By 1971, Smith was playing keyboards with The Voices of East Harlem. He traveled with the group to Accra, Ghana, for the Soul to Soul concert at Black Star Square on March 6, 1971. Smith appears playing keyboards with the Voices in the concert documentary Soul to Soul.

By the mid-1970s, Smith was working in recording studios and touring bands. He recorded with Betty Davis, playing keyboards on They Say I'm Different (1974) and ARP synthesizer on "Feelins" and "The Lone Ranger" from Nasty Gal (1975).

Smith also became part of Robert Palmer's band. A 1976 Cash Box review identified him on clavinet, organ and ARP synthesizer in Palmer's touring group. His work with Palmer included Some People Can Do What They Like (1976) and Double Fun (1978).

Smith worked with Kip Carmen and Cornell Dupree. He played keyboards on Carmen's recordings and arranged and directed "This Island Is Our Home". Smith also played with King Curtis, Robert Palmer and Candi Staton.

His work during the early 1980s included piano and keyboards for Rainey and songwriting for Gwen McCrae.

Smith had a long association with Gordon Edwards and Stuff. After Richard Tee died in 1993, Smith recorded Made in America: A Remembrance of Richard Tee with Stuff. Recorded in New York in November 1993, the album featured Smith on acoustic piano and keyboards with Edwards, Cornell Dupree, Eric Gale, Steve Gadd and Chris Parker. Smith and Beverley Hanshaw wrote the album's title track, "Made in America". Smith continued playing with Stuff and appeared on Now! on keyboards and vocals.

Smith also worked as an arranger, songwriter and producer. In 2006, he produced Japanese jazz singer Momose's album The Cabaret.

In 2011, Smith released two albums under his own name. It Is What It Is, released in August, included "Tee", "Play On Tee" and a new recording of "Made in America". Hymns My Mother Loved, a collection of 24 hymns and spirituals, followed in September.

In 2013, Edwards and Stuff organized a benefit concert for Smith at 78 Below in New York after Smith had been hospitalized. Edwards and Smith had known each other for more than 40 years, and Smith had played keyboards with Stuff for much of that period. The benefit announcement described Smith as a keyboardist, writer and arranger and traced his career through performances with artists including Michael McDonald, The Doobie Brothers, Melba Moore, Rainey, Palmer, Staton and King Curtis.

== Selected discography ==
=== Solo ===
- It Is What It Is (2011)
- Hymns My Mother Loved (2011)

=== With Betty Davis ===
- They Say I'm Different (1974) – keyboards
- Nasty Gal (1975) – ARP synthesizer on "Feelins" and "The Lone Ranger"

=== With Robert Palmer ===
- Some People Can Do What They Like (1976) – keyboards
- Double Fun (1978) – keyboards, including "Every Kinda People"

=== With Kip Carmen ===
- Just for Tonight – keyboards
- "This Island Is Our Home" – arranger, director and keyboards

=== With Chuck Rainey ===
- Born Again (1981) – piano, electric piano, organ, clavinet and synthesizer; writer of "Lady D."

=== With Gwen McCrae ===
- On My Way (1982) – composer

=== With Stuff ===
- Made in America: A Remembrance of Richard Tee (1994) – acoustic piano and keyboards; co-writer of "Made in America"
- Now! – keyboards and vocals

=== As producer ===
- Momose – The Cabaret (2006)
