= Gordon Edwards (musician) =

American bassist and bandleader

- Born: February 26, 1938 (age 88); Brooklyn, New York
- Genres: R&B; soul; funk; jazz; jazz fusion
- Occupations: Bassist; bandleader; session musician; composer; arranger
- Instruments: Bass guitar; vocals
- Years active: 1960s–present

Gordon Edwards (Born February 26, 1938) in Brooklyn, New York is an American bassist, bandleader, session musician, composer and arranger, and a United States military veteran. He is the founder and leader of the New York-based band Stuff. A prominent New York session bassist during the 1970s, Edwards recorded with artists including John Lennon, Paul Simon, Aretha Franklin, James Brown, Donny Hathaway, Gladys Knight & the Pips, Joe Cocker, Carly Simon, Hall & Oates, Grover Washington Jr. and Van McCoy.

== Career ==
=== Session work ===
Edwards became part of the New York recording scene as a bassist, arranger and musical contractor. His recording work included sessions with Aretha Franklin, James Brown, Paul Simon, Van McCoy, Carly Simon, David Ruffin, Melba Moore, Phoebe Snow and Etta James.

In 1973, Edwards played bass on John Lennon's album Mind Games. The musicians Lennon assembled for the album included Edwards, guitarist David Spinozza, keyboardist Ken Ascher, drummers Jim Keltner and Rick Marotta, saxophonist Michael Brecker and pedal steel guitarist Sneaky Pete Kleinow.

Edwards also recorded with Paul Simon, playing on There Goes Rhymin' Simon (1973) and "Gone at Last", Simon's duet with Phoebe Snow from Still Crazy After All These Years (1975).

He played bass on Van McCoy's Disco Baby (1975), which included the number-one single "The Hustle".

=== Stuff ===
Edwards formed the Encyclopedia of Soul around 1967. The group developed into Stuff, with Edwards as its leader. The band's lineup came to include keyboardist Richard Tee, guitarists Cornell Dupree and Eric Gale, drummers Steve Gadd and Chris Parker, and Edwards on bass.

Stuff grew out of the New York session scene, with members of the group regularly backing major recording artists individually and together. In December 1976, Democrat and Chronicle music critic Jack Garner described the group as "the cream of the New York session scene" and identified Edwards as the leader of Stuff. Discussing how frequently the musicians could be heard outside their own records, Edwards said, "Fifty per cent of the commercials on television have at least some of us playing on them."

The group recorded its self-titled debut album, Stuff, for Warner Bros. Records in 1976. Garner noted that the members had previously played, individually or collectively, behind artists including Aretha Franklin, Gladys Knight, Paul Simon, John Lennon, Chick Corea, George Harrison, Tom Scott and Quincy Jones.

In February 1977, Stan Mieses of the El Paso Herald-Post described Stuff as six in-demand studio musicians who had decided to form their own group. He wrote that the band's performances combined the individual styles of Tee, Gale, Dupree, Edwards, Parker and Gadd.

Stuff followed its debut with More Stuff (1977), Live Stuff (1978) and Stuff It (1978). Edwards played bass and contributed compositions to the group's recordings.

Stuff also worked with other artists as a unit. The band backed Joe Cocker and appeared with him on Saturday Night Live.

The musicians continued to perform together after the band's original recording period. Following Richard Tee's death in July 1993, Edwards, Dupree, Gale, Parker and Jimmy Smith were among the musicians announced for a memorial performance for Tee at the Lone Star Roadhouse in New York.

Edwards continued performing with later versions of Stuff. He played bass on Made in America: A Remembrance of Richard Tee, recorded in New York in November 1993 with Dupree, Gale, Gadd, Parker and keyboardist James Allen "Jimmy" Smith.

== Military service ==
Edwards is a United States military veteran. In an oral-history interview conducted while he was living at a New York State veterans' home, Edwards discussed his military service and veterans' care.

== Selected discography ==
=== With Stuff ===
- Stuff (Warner Bros., 1976)
- More Stuff (Warner Bros., 1977)
- Live Stuff (Warner Bros., 1978)
- Stuff It (Warner Bros., 1978)
- Live in New York (1980)
- Made in America: A Remembrance of Richard Tee (1994)
- The Right Stuff (1996)
- Live at Montreux 1976 (2008)

=== Selected recording credits ===
- Leon Thomas – Blues and the Soulful Truth (1972)
- Grant Green – The Final Comedown (1972)
- Bernard Purdie – Shaft (1972)
- Paul Simon – There Goes Rhymin' Simon (1973)
- John Lennon – Mind Games (1973)
- Esther Phillips – Black-Eyed Blues (1973)
- James Brown – The Payback (1973)
- Aretha Franklin – With Everything I Feel in Me (1974)
- James Brown – Reality (1974)
- Rufus Thomas – Do the Funky Chicken / later recordings
- Van McCoy – Disco Baby (1975)
- Nikki Giovanni – The Way I Feel (1975)
- Paul Simon – Still Crazy After All These Years (1975)
- The Salsoul Orchestra – The Salsoul Orchestra (1975)
- Paul Butterfield – Put It in Your Ear (1976)
- Phoebe Snow – Second Childhood (1976)
- Joe Cocker – Stingray (1976)
- Melba Moore – This Is It (1976)
- Melba Moore – Melba (1976)
- Weldon Irvine – Sinbad (1976)
- The Salsoul Orchestra – Nice 'n' Naasty (1976)
- The Salsoul Orchestra – Christmas Jollies (1976)
- Faith, Hope & Charity – Life Goes On (1976)
- General Johnson – General Johnson (1976)
- Louie Ramirez – A Different Shade of Black (1976)
- David Ruffin – In My Stride (1977)
- Frankie Valli – Lady Put the Light Out (1977)
- The Salsoul Orchestra – Magic Journey (1977)
- Charo and The Salsoul Orchestra – Cuchi-Cuchi (1977)
- Carla Bley – Dinner Music (1977)
- Jun Fukamachi – Evening Star (1977)
- Odyssey – Odyssey (1977)
- Pee Wee Ellis – Home in the Country (1977)
- Carly Simon – Boys in the Trees (1978)
- Deodato – Love Island (1978)
- Etta James – Etta Is Betta Than Evvah! (1978)
- Gladys Knight & the Pips – The One and Only (1978)
- Van McCoy – My Favourite Fantasy (1978)
- Kate & Anna McGarrigle – Pronto Monto (1978)
- Faith, Hope & Charity – Faith, Hope & Charity (1978)
- Aretha Franklin – La Diva (1979)
- Janis Ian – Night Rains (1979)
- Stacy Lattisaw – Young and in Love (1979)
- John Mayall – Bottom Line (1979)
- Loleatta Holloway – Love Sensation (1980)
- Paul Simon – One-Trick Pony (1980)
- Joe Bataan – Mestizo (1980)
- Salena Jones – My Love (1981)
- Paul Simon – Hearts and Bones (1983)
