= All the King's Horses (Grover Washington Jr. album) =

Studio album by Grover Washington Jr.
- Released: July 1, 1972
- Recorded: May & June 1972
- Studio: Van Gelder Studio, Englewood Cliffs, New Jersey
- Genre: Jazz
- Length: 32:05
- Label: Kudu
- Producer: Creed Taylor

Grover Washington Jr. chronology
Inner City Blues (1972)	All the King's Horses (1972)	Soul Box (1973)

Professional ratings
Review scores
Source	Rating
AllMusic	4/5 stars
The Rolling Stone Jazz Record Guide	2/5 stars

All the King's Horses is the second album by American saxophonist Grover Washington Jr. It was recorded in 1972 and released on Kudu Records the same year. In 2008, it was reissued on CD by Verve/GRP Records.

== Track listing ==
1. "No Tears, in the End" (Ralph MacDonald, William Salter) – 3:50
2. "All the King's Horses" (Aretha Franklin) – 3:48
3. "Where Is the Love" (Ralph MacDonald, William Salter) – 5:07
4. "Body and Soul (Montage)" (Edward Heyman, Frank Eyton, Johnny Green) – 3:04
5. "Lean on Me" (Bill Withers) – 4:25
6. "Lover Man" (Jimmy Davis, James Sherman, Ram Ramirez) – 7:02
7. "Love Song 1700" (Henry Purcell) – 4:49

== Personnel ==
- Grover Washington Jr. – alto saxophone, tenor saxophone, alto saxophone solo (4, 6), tenor saxophone solo (7)
- Bob James – electric piano, harpsichord, arrangements and conductor
- Richard Tee – organ
- Gene Bertoncini – guitar
- Cornell Dupree – guitar
- Eric Gale – guitar solo (1–5, 7)
- David Spinozza – guitar solo (6)
- Gordon Edwards – bass (1)
- Ron Carter – bass (2–7)
- Bernard Purdie – drums (1, 2, 5)
- Billy Cobham – drums (4, 6, 7)
- Airto Moreira – percussion
- Ralph MacDonald – congas
- Marvin Stamm – trumpet solo (6), flugelhorn solo (6)

Brass and woodwind section

- George Marge – alto saxophone, flute, English horn, oboe, recorder
- Pepper Adams – baritone saxophone
- Arthur Clarke – baritone saxophone, flute
- Wayne Andre, Paul Faulise, Tony Studd – trombone
- Jon Faddis, John Frosk, Marky Markowitz, Ernie Royal, Alan Rubin, Marvin Stamm, Snooky Young – trumpet, flugelhorn
- Ray Alonge, Donald Corrado, Fred Klein, Brooks Tillotson – French horn

String section

- Charles McCracken and George Ricci – cello
- Margaret Ross – harp
- Richard Dickler, Emanuel Vardi – viola
- Alexander Cores, Bernard Eichen, Max Ellen, Paul Gershman, Emanuel Green, Harold Kohon, Harry Lookofsky, Joe Malin, David Nadien, Gene Orloff, John Pintaualle, Irving Spice – violin

String trio (Tracks 4, 6 & 7)

- George Ricci – cello
- Emanuel Vardi – viola
- David Nadien – violin

Production

- Creed Taylor – producer
- Rudy Van Gelder – engineer
- Bob Ciano – album design
- Pete Turner – photography
