= Blow It Out (album) =

Studio album by Tom Scott
- Released: July 1977
- Recorded: 1976
- Studio: A&M (Hollywood, California); A&R Recording (New York City, New York)
- Genre: Jazz fusion
- Length: 41:18
- Label: Ode
- Producer: Tom Scott; Hank Cicalo

Tom Scott chronology
| New York Connection (1975) | Blow It Out (1977) | Intimate Strangers (1978) |

Professional ratings
Review scores
| Source | Rating |
|---|---|
| The Rolling Stone Jazz Record Guide | 1/5 stars |

Blow It Out is a jazz fusion album released in 1977 by Tom Scott. It peaked at No. 87 Billboard 200.

== Track listing ==
All tracks composed and arranged by Tom Scott except where indicated

1. "Gotcha" (Theme from Starsky & Hutch) – 3:30
2. "Smoothin' on Down" – 4:22
3. "Dream Lady" – 4:33
4. "I Wanna Be" (Richard Tee) – 4:49
5. "Shadows" – 7:40
6. "You've Got the Feel'n" – 5:06
7. "Down to Your Soul" (Scott, Dee Palmer) – 5:25
8. "It's So Beautiful to Be" (Ralph MacDonald, William Salter) – 5:36

== Personnel ==
- Tom Scott – horns, Lyricon (1–3), vocals (7), alto sax solo (8)
- Richard Tee – acoustic piano (1, 3, 4, 6, 8), organ (2), Fender Rhodes (5, 7), clavinet (7)
- Kenny Ascher – clavinet (2)
- Dennis Budimir – guitars (1)
- Ray Parker Jr. – guitars (1)
- Hugh McCracken – guitars (2–4, 6–8), guitar solo (7)
- John Tropea – guitars (2, 3)
- Eric Gale – guitars (4–8)
- Chuck Rainey – bass (1, 4)
- Gary King – bass (2, 3, 5–7)
- Will Lee – bass (8)
- Rick Marotta – drums (1, 2, 5), drum overdubs (8)
- Chris Parker – drums (8)
- Steve Gadd – percussion (1), drums (3, 4, 6, 7)
- Ralph MacDonald – congas (1), cowbell (1), tambourine (1), percussion (2–8)
- Chuck Findley – trumpet (4)
- Dick Hyde – bass trumpet (4)

Production

- Tom Scott – producer, arrangements
- Hank Cicalo – producer, engineer
- Ellis Sorkin – assistant engineer
- Artisan Sound Recorders (North Hollywood, California) – mastering location
- Marshall Sosson – concertmaster
- Chuck Beeson – art direction, design
- Jim McCrary – photography
- Michael Manoogian – hand lettering
