= Stuff (Stuff album) =

Studio album by Stuff
- Released: 1976
- Recorded: 1975–1976
- Studios: Long View Farm Studios, North Brookfield, Massachusetts
- Genres: Jazz, funk, jazz fusion
- Length: 39:53
- Label: Warner Bros.
- Producers: Herbie Lovelle, Tommy LiPuma

Stuff chronology
Stuff (1976)	More Stuff (1977)

Stuff is the debut studio disc by the group Stuff, a team of renowned session musicians. Released in 1976 on Warner Bros., it was produced by Herb Lovelle and jazz producer Tommy LiPuma.

== Track listing ==
1. "Foots" (Richard Tee, Cornell Dupree, Eric Gale, Gordon Edwards, Steve Gadd, Chris Parker) 3:58
2. "My Sweetness" (Tee) 3:21
3. "(Do You) Want Some of This?" (Tee) 4:20
4. "Looking for the Juice" (Tee, Edwards) 3:52
5. "Reflections of Divine Love" (J.C. White) 5:00
6. "How Long Will It Last" (Gale) 4:15
7. "Sun Song" (Leon Thomas) 4:24
8. "Happy Farms" (Dupree) 3:54
9. "Dixie/Up on the Roof" (Traditional/Gerry Goffin, Carole King) 6:33

== Personnel ==
Stuff

- Richard Tee - Hammond B-3 organ, acoustic and electric pianos
- Cornell Dupree - acoustic and electric guitars
- Eric Gale - acoustic and electric guitars
- Gordon Edwards - bass, percussion
- Chris Parker, Steve Gadd - drums, percussion

== Production ==
- Arranged by Stuff
- Produced by Herb Lovelle (for Goryan Productions) & Tommy LiPuma (for Just Sunshine Records)
- Recording Engineers: Al Schmitt, Gil Markle & Jesse Henderson
- Mixed by Gil Markle
- Mastered by George Marino
- Tracks 2 & 3 published by Coffin Music.
- Track 1 published by Stuff by Stuff Music.
- Track 4 published by Yangor Music/Coffin Music.
- Track 5 published by Jayglow Music/Kwan Music/Savar Music.
- Track 6 published by Antisia Music, Inc.
- Track 7 published by Nuwaupu Music.
- Track 8 published by Corerm Music.
- Track 9 published by Public Domain/Screen Gems-EMI Music.
