= Negril (album) =

Studio album by Eric Gale
- Released: 1975
- Recorded: 1975
- Studio: Harry J's Recording Studio
- Genre: Jazz
- Labels: Micron Music Limited, KLIK Records
- Producer: Eric Gale

Eric Gale chronology
Forecast (1973)	Negril (1975)	Ginseng Woman (1977)

Negril is an album released in 1975 from a session produced, arranged, and almost entirely composed by guitarist Eric Gale. It includes some of Jamaica's best-known musicians of the time. The album expresses Gale's fondness for the beach and natural beauty of the Jamaican seaside village Negril, which became a popular destination for tourists.

== Session and first release ==
Negril was recorded at the Harry J Studio in Kingston, Jamaica. It was released in Jamaica by Micron Music, co-owned by executive producer Michael Johnston, and in the UK by Klik Records.

Gale was under contract with CTI Records, so he could not be identified as the session leader. CTI's founder, Creed Taylor, approved of Gale's participation because the cover lists him "courtesy of C.T.I." and publishing credit is listed on the label as "Creede (sic) Taylor Inc". The album incorrectly attributes session leader to drummer Sparrow Martin and songwriting to "Eric Gayle."

== Re-releases ==
In 1992, Negril was re-released by France's Concert Records (a.k.a. Esoldun), founded by Enzo Hamilton. The CD insert says, "Licensed from Bunny Lee by Enzo Hamilton." In 2008 Michael Johnston claimed that European releases of the album were unauthorized. In 2003 it was reissued by Roving Spirits of Japan. The album was then sold on the House of Reggae label and attributed to "Peter Tosh & Friends". Gale is given much smaller billing on the cover.

A 2008 article about the album in the Jamaica Gleaner, "Revisiting Eric Gale's Negril", which is based on an interview with Johnston, said that Tosh played rhythm guitar on one track, I Shot the Sheriff, though rhythm guitar is audible on other tracks. The Klik release has Tosh listed as playing lead and rhythm guitar, but the cover of the Micron release and its reprint both list Tosh as playing rhythm guitar only. In an interview for a 2008 article in the Jamaica Gleaner, Micron owner Michael Johnston claims to have been the album's producer, though the original Micron release credits Eric Gale. Johnston may have been referring to his role as executive producer.

The album is also offered by Charly Records. It is renamed Negril's Red Ground Funk by "Negril," though Gale is given no credit and the original release bore no such band name. The album Negril has no connection with a Brazilian band by that name. That group's album is sometimes erroneously listed as additional work by the same artist.

Major music streaming services mostly include the album; some properly crediting Gale and others not.

== Critical reception ==
A review on the reggae site Zinc Fence says of Negril that "listeners with tastes limited to heavy dub were never likely to find anything to tickle their palettes here, yet anyone looking for a mellow, superbly-played mid-1970s instrumental reggae album could do far worse than seek this out." Black Music magazine called Gale's playing on Negril "sensitive, subtle, and graceful." Author and music critic John Masouri called the album "a delightful hybrid of reggae, nyahbinghi, soul, and jazz, with just a touch of calypso added for good measure." Masouri notes that Peter Tosh's "most telling contribution is the scything wah wah that underpins Gale's lead guitar on I Shot the Sheriff." "Further traces of Tosh are less distinct," Masouri observes. Música Macando says that "Negril sits alongside Below The Bassline by Ernest Ranglin as a distinguished exploration into jazz guitar within reggae subgenres." It commends the album as "an absolute essential listen for connoisseurs of instrumental reggae and Jamaican jazz."

== Track listing ==
All tracks composed by Eric Gale except where noted. Track order is for original LP release by Micron.

Side one

1. "Lighthouse" – 6:05
2. "East Side, West Side" – 4:53
3. "Honey Coral Rock" – 3:45
4. "Negril" – 3:52

Side two

1. "Red Ground Funk" – 5:17
2. "Rasta" – 5:30
3. "Negril Sea Sunset" – 5:38
4. "I Shot the Sheriff" (Bob Marley) – 5:00

== Personnel ==
- Eric Gale ("courtesy of C.T.I.") – lead guitar, producer, arranger
- Cedric Brooks – saxophone, percussion
- Leslie Butler – organ, synthesizer
- Keith Sterling – piano
- Richard Tee – piano
- Peter Tosh – rhythm guitar
- Aston Barrett – bass guitar
- Val Douglas – bass guitar
- Paul Douglas – drums
- Sparrow Martin – drums
- Joe Higgs – percussion
- Uziah Thompson – percussion

Production

- Michael Johnston – executive producer
- Sylvan Morris – recording engineer
- Buddy Davidson – mixing engineer
- Trevor Campbell – art and cover design
- Recorded at Harry J Studio, Kingston
