= More Stuff =

Studio album by Stuff
- Released: 1977
- Recorded: 1976–1977
- Studio: Mediasound (New York City)
- Genres: Jazz, funk, jazz fusion, soul music, disco
- Label: Warner Bros.
- Producers: Stuff, Van McCoy, Charles Kipps

Stuff chronology
Stuff (1976)	More Stuff (1977)	Stuff It (1978)

More Stuff is the title of the second full-length studio release by the group Stuff. It was released in 1977, a year after their debut, on Warner Bros. Records. For the recordings, the group teamed up with Charles Kipps and Van McCoy, who by then had a disco hit with "The Hustle". The band also covers the Stevie Wonder song "As", which appeared on his Songs in the Key of Life disc from 1976.

At the 20th annual Grammy Awards, More Stuff was nominated for Best R&B Instrumental Performance.

== Track listing ==
1. "This One's for You" (Richard Tee) 5:07
2. "And Here You Are" (Tee, Gordon Edwards) 4:59
3. "Subway (Cornell Dupree) 3:22
4. "Love of Mine" (Edwards) 4:05
5. "Honey Coral Rock" (Eric Gale) 5:09
6. "Sometimes Bubba Gets Down" (Chris Parker) 3:36
7. "As" (Stevie Wonder) 3:23
8. "Need Somebody" (Tee, Edwards) 6:30

== Personnel ==
Stuff

- Richard Tee – keyboards
- Eric Gale, Cornell Dupree – guitars
- Gordon Edwards – bass, percussion
- Steve Gadd, Chris Parker – drums, percussion

Additional personnel

- Gene Orloff – violin on "And Here You Are"

== Production ==
- Arranged by Stuff
- Produced by Stuff, Van McCoy & Charles Kipps
- Recorded & Mixed by Alan Varner & Alec Head; assisted by Don Berman & Ramona Janquitto
- Track 1 published by Bloody Music Inc. Tracks 2 & 8 published by Yangor Music Inc./Bloody Music Inc. Track 3 published by Corerm Music Inc. Track 4 published by Yangor Music Inc. Track 5 published by Gale Pyramid Music Inc. Track 6 published by M'Bubba Music Inc. Track 7 published by Jobete Music Inc./Black Bull Music Inc.
