= Alice Clark =

Alice Clark may refer to:

- Alice Clark (historian), British feminist and historian
- Alice Clark (singer), American soul singer
- Alice Pollard Clark, American judge

== See also ==
- Alice Clarke, English cricketer
- Alyce Clarke, American politician
