= I'm in Love (Bobby Womack song) =

1974 single by Aretha Franklin

Single by Wilson Pickett

from the album I'm in Love
- Released: 1967
- Recorded: 1967
- Genre: Soul, R&B
- Length: 2:48
- Label: Atlantic
- Songwriter: Bobby Womack
- Producer: Jerry Wexler

Wilson Pickett singles chronology
"Funky Broadway" (1967)	"I'm in Love" (1967)	"Stagger Lee" (1968)

"I'm in Love"

Single by Aretha Franklin

from the album Let Me in Your Life
- B-side: "Oh Baby"
- Released: April 1974
- Recorded: 1973
- Studio: A & R Recording (New York, NY)
- Genre: Soul
- Length: 2:48
- Label: Atlantic
- Songwriter: Bobby Womack
- Producers: Aretha Franklin, Arif Mardin, Jerry Wexler

Aretha Franklin singles chronology
"Until You Come Back to Me (That's What I'm Gonna Do)" (1973)	"I'm in Love" (1974)	"Ain't Nothing Like the Real Thing" (1974)

"I'm in Love" is a song written by Bobby Womack. It was first recorded by Wilson Pickett in 1967, which gave him a top-ten R&B hit on Billboard's chart in 1968, peaking at number 4 as well as peaking at number 45 on the Billboard Hot 100.

== Background ==
"I'm in Love" was written in response to some of the criticism he had been receiving after marrying the widow of the recently deceased Sam Cooke.

== Cover versions ==
- Womack himself recorded his version of the song in 1968 shortly after Pickett's version was released and included it on his 1969 album, Fly Me to the Moon.
- The version to achieve the most success came in 1974, when Aretha Franklin released it as a single. Her version hit number 1 on Billboard's R&B chart for two weeks and also peaked at number 19 on the Billboard Hot 100. Wilson Pickett's version is most recently used as the back-track for Nature of the Beast's "When It's Good".
- Tom Petty and the Heartbreakers covered the song in concert in the early 1980s, and a version is featured on their set The Live Anthology.
- The Temptations covered the song in 2007 in the studio album Back to Front.

== Personnel ==
Wilson Pickett version

- Produced by Tommy Cogbill & Tom Dowd
- Wilson Pickett - vocals
- Gene Chrisman - drums
- Tommy Cogbill - electric bass
- Bobby Emmons - organ
- Bobby Wood - piano
- Bobby Womack - lead guitar
- Reggie Young - additional guitar
- Charlie Chalmers - tenor saxophone
- King Curtis - tenor saxophone
- Gene "Bowlegs" Miller - trumpet
- Floyd Newman - baritone saxophone

Bobby Womack version

- Produced by Chips Moman
- Bobby Womack - vocals, guitar, musical arrangement
- Gene Chrisman - drums
- Bobby Emmons - organ
- Mike Leech - bass, musical arrangement
- Bobby Wood - piano
- Reggie Young - guitar

Aretha Franklin version

- Aretha Franklin - lead vocals
- Judy Clay - background vocals
- Gwen Guthrie - background vocals
- Cissy Houston - background vocals
- Deidre Tuck - background vocals
- William Eaton - orchestral arrangement
- Stan Clarke - bass
- Cornell Dupree - guitar
- Donny Hathaway - acoustic piano
- Bob James - additional keyboards
- Ralph MacDonald - percussion
- Rick Marotta - drums
- Gene Orloff - concertmaster
- David Spinozza - guitar
