= Blow It Out =

Blow It Out may refer to:

- "Blow It Out" (Ludacris song)
- Blow It Out (Features song)
- Blow It Out (album), a 1977 album by Tom Scott
