= Mikell's =

Former jazz club in New York City

Coordinates: 40.79366°N 73.96705°W

Mikell's was a jazz club on the corner of 97th Street and Columbus Avenue, in New York City.

Run by Mike Mikell and Pat Mikell, from 1969 to 1991 it was a regular venue for New York's top studio and session musicians, who would turn up for jam sessions with major soul, funk and jazz artists visiting the city. Paul Shaffer, bandleader for CBS's Late Show with David Letterman, called Mikell's "soul heaven".

Among the performers and bands associated with Mikell's are Stuff, originally called The Encyclopedia of Soul, the alliance of studio musicians that played almost weekly at Mikell's in the 1970s.

Writer James Baldwin's brother David worked as a bartender at the club in the 1970s and 1980s, thereby attracting patronage from Baldwin as well as other authors, including Toni Morrison, Amiri Baraka, and Maya Angelou, and musician friends such as Art Blakey, Roy Ayres and Wynton Marsalis.

== 1970s ==
Stephane Grappelli, French jazz violinist who co-founded the Quintette du Hot Club de France, performed at Mikell's in the mid-1970s. Other performers included guitarist Joe Beck, and reedman Joe Farrell. Chico Hamilton's Quartet with Arthur Blythe (sax), Steve Torre (trombone, shells, & bass), and Rodney Jones (guitar), appeared several times in the late 1970s. The band Stuff, formed in 1974, was closely associated with Mikell's, playing there three nights a week until 1980, with jam sessions taking place with visiting soul, jazz and funk stars and singers such as Stevie Wonder and Joe Cocker.

== 1980s ==
In early 1980, the club served for rehearsals for Art Blakey and the Jazz Messengers Big Band, which included Wynton Marsalis, and which would result in the 1980 album Art Blakey and the Jazz Messengers Big Band Live at Montreux and Northsea. Other artists appearing at the club in the 1980s included Milt Jackson, Ray Brown, Cedar Walton and Mickey Roker (June 1983), and Paquito D'Rivera (January 1984).

Mikell's closed in 1991.

== Live albums recorded at Mikell's ==
- Stuff – Live in New York – Recorded live in 1980 by David Hewitt on the Record Plant Black Truck.
- John Tropea - Live at Mikell’s New York - Recorded live in 1980 by David Hewitt on the Record Plant Black Truck, released 1994.
- Art Blakey and Jazz Messengers - New York Scene - May 1984.
