= Your Baby Is a Lady =

Album by Jackie DeShannon

Studio album by Jackie DeShannon
- Released: 1974
- Studio: Regent Sound (New York City); Atlantic (New York City)
- Genre: Pop
- Label: Atlantic
- Producer: Arthur Jenkins, Ralph MacDonald, William Eaton

Jackie DeShannon chronology
Jackie (1972)	Your Baby Is a Lady (1974)	New Arrangement (1975)

Your Baby Is a Lady is an LP album by Jackie DeShannon, released by Atlantic Records as catalog number SD-7303 in 1974.

== Track listing ==
Track	Song	Writer(s)	Time
1	"Small Town Girl"	Bobby Charles, Rick Danko	2:45
2	"Jimmie, Just Sing Me One More Song"	Vicki Gellman, Wendy Gell	2:35
3	"I Won't Let You Go"	Ralph MacDonald, William Salter	2:54
4	"(If You Never Have a Big Hit Record) You're Still Gonna Be My Star"	Doc Pomus, Myles Chase	3:04
5	"Your Baby Is a Lady"	Donna Weiss, DeShannon	3:29
6	"You Touch and You Go"	DeShannon, Vini Poncia	2:50
7	"The Other Side of Me"	Howard Greenfield, Neil Sedaka	2:37
8	"That's What I'm Here For"	Stephen Schwartz	3:45
9	"You've Changed"	DeShannon, Vini Poncia	2:45
10	"I Don't Know What's the Matter With My Baby"	Ralph MacDonald, William Salter	2:58

== Personnel ==
- Jackie DeShannon - lead and backing vocals
- Cornell Dupree, Hugh McCracken, Keith Loving - guitar
- William Salter - bass
- Richard Tee, Arthur Jenkins - piano, organ
- Ken Bichel - synthesizer
- Steve Gadd, Andrew Smith - drums
- Ralph MacDonald - percussion
- Cissy Houston, Deirdre Tuck, Gwen Guthrie, Judy Clay, Sammy Turner, J.R. Bailey - backing vocals
- David "Fathead" Newman - tenor and alto saxophone
- Garnett Brown - trombone solo on "I Won't Let You Go"

Technical

- Gene Paul, Lew Hahn, Bob Liftin - engineer
