= Tune In, Turn On =

Tune in, Turn On

Studio album by Benny Golson
- Released: 1967
- Recorded: April 12, 1967
- Studio: New York City
- Genre: Jazz
- Length: 30:58
- Label: Verve; V-8710
- Producer: Tom Wilson

Benny Golson chronology
Stockholm Sojourn (1964)	Tune in, Turn On (1967)	Are You Real (1977)

Tune In, Turn On (subtitled To the Hippest Commercials of the Sixties) is an album by Benny Golson featuring music from television advertisements recorded in 1967 and released on the Verve label.

== Reception ==
Professional ratings
Review scores
Source	Rating
Allmusic	2/5 stars
The Penguin Guide to Jazz Recordings	2/4 stars

The Allmusic review states, "the kind of release that serious jazz listeners loathed. For sheer enjoyment, however, one can raise the rating by better than half-it is fun even if it isn't remotely the best jazz, or jazz at all".

== Track listing ==
1. "Music to Watch Girls By" (Sid Ramin) - 2:54
2. "Wink" (Paul Murphy) - 2:42
3. "The Dis-Advantages of You" (Mitch Leigh) - 2:19
4. "No Matter What Shape (Your Stomach's In)" (Granville "Sascha" Burland) - 2:21
5. "Right Any Time of the Day" (John Fox, Barry Ballister) - 2:32
6. "Music to Think By" (Richard Boyell) - 2:35
7. "The Swinger" (Mitch Leigh) - 2:35
8. "The Magnificent Seven" (Elmer Bernstein) - 2:49
9. "Cool Whip" (Roy Eaton) - 2:35
10. "The Golden Glow" (Benny Golson) - 2:10
11. "Fried Bananas" (Gary McFarland) - 2:57
12. "Happiness Is" (Paul Evans, Paul Parnes) - 2:29

== Personnel ==
- Benny Golson - arranger, tenor saxophone
- Art Farmer - trumpet, flugelhorn
- Richard Tee - piano
- Eric Gale - guitar
- Jimmy Tyrell - bass
- Bernard Purdie - drums
- Warren Smith - percussion
- Other unnamed musicians
