= Stuff (band) =

American jazz fusion band

- Origin: New York City
- Genres: Jazz fusion, jazz, smooth jazz, crossover jazz
- Years active: 1970s–1980s
- Labels: A&M, Warner Bros.
- Past members: Cornell Dupree; Steve Gadd; Gordon Edwards; Richard Tee; Eric Gale; Chris Parker; James Alan Smith (James Allen Smith)

Stuff was an American jazz fusion band during the late 1970s and early 1980s. The members were Gordon Edwards (bass guitar), Richard Tee (keyboards), Eric Gale (guitar), Cornell Dupree (guitar), Chris Parker (drums), and later Steve Gadd (drums).

== History ==
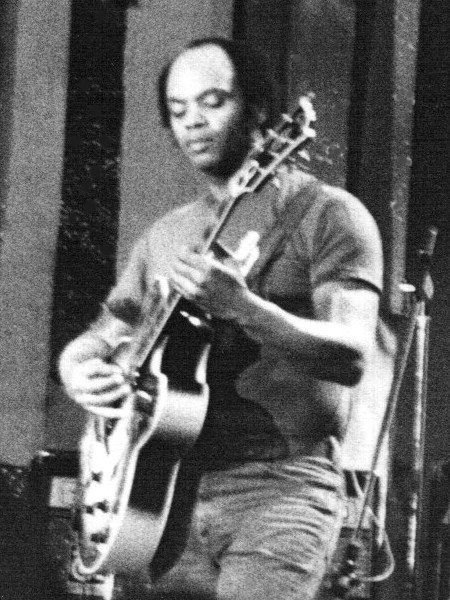
Eric Gale in July 1976

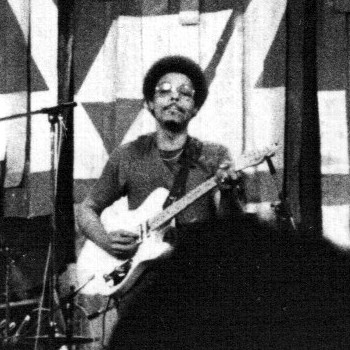
Cornell Dupree in July 1976

Edwards describes how the band was founded:

"I was contracting and playing studio sessions, and hired Cornell for many of the dates – so we started recruiting for the band. One day at Rudy Van Gelder's – I remember it was a hell of a job; it was for Queen Esther Marrow, great singer. George Benson was on the job, Bernard Purdie, and Richard Tee on keyboards. Esther asked me if she could use the band for a club date she had lined up – a club called Mikell's in New York City. We did play there, and Richard Tee stopped by one time and he started coming every night. We only worked Monday through Thursday, and Mikell's was packed, wall to wall, round the block."

After parting ways with Esther the band returned to play there every week:

"Steve Gadd came by one night to sit in with us, as did Eric Gale, and they both became a part of the band. We were rolling heavy, and one night I was approached by Michael Lang, the gentleman who put on Woodstock, who said he was sure he could get us a record deal – were we interested. Sure enough Warner Bros. flew in from California to hear us live. They liked us, but we couldn't use the name The Encyclopaedia of Soul – it was too long. I remember we were in a diner that was on the corner by Atlantic Records one day; there was me, Michael Lang, Cornell Dupree and Erma Dupree and we were trying to decide what we would call the band. It was Erma who said, "You know Gordon, you always call everybody stuff, I don't care who it is. You should call the band Stuff."

They joined Van McCoy's big disco hit "Hustle" in 1975. Members of Stuff were the most important session musicians of that era, playing with Brook Benton, Herbie Mann, Aretha Franklin, and Paul Simon. They supported Joe Cocker during his world tour to promote his Stingray album and performed on Saturday Night Live in its second season. The band released five albums between 1975 and 1980. Their second full-length studio album: More Stuff earned a Grammy nomination. Stuff's first album was recorded at Long View Farm in North Brookfield, Massachusetts and produced by Herb Lovelle in 1976. In Japan it was certified platinum.

Stuff was associated with Mikell's, the New York jazz club where session musicians would meet for jam sessions with visiting soul, jazz, and funk musicians.

== Discography ==
- 1976 Stuff (Warner Bros.)
- 1977 More Stuff (Warner Bros.)
- 1978 Live Stuff (Warner Bros.)
- 1979 Stuff It (Warner Bros.)
- 1980 Live in New York (Warner Bros.)
- 1996 The Right Stuff (Warner Bros.)
- 2008 DVD: Live at Montreux 1976 (Eagle Rock)

== See also ==
- Van McCoy
