= It's a Funky Thing to Do =

Studio album by Hank Crawford
- Released: 1971
- Recorded: December 10, 1970 at Regent Sounds Studios in NYC
- Genre: Jazz
- Length: 34:49
- Label: Cotillion; SD 18003
- Producer: Joel Dorn

Hank Crawford chronology
Mr. Blues Plays Lady Soul (1969)	It's a Funky Thing to Do (1971)	Help Me Make It Through the Night (1972)

It's a Funky Thing to Do is the eleventh album by the saxophonist Hank Crawford, released on the Cotillion label in 1971.

== Reception ==
Professional ratings
Review scores
Source	Rating
AllMusic	2.5/5 stars
The Penguin Guide to Jazz Recordings	3/4 stars

AllMusic stated: "Crawford plays well, as usual but, other than 'Parker's Mood', none of the seven selections are particularly memorable nor do they stand out from the crowd".

== Track listing ==
All compositions by Hank Crawford except as indicated

1. "It's a Funky Thing to Do" (Pee Wee Ellis) - 3:34
2. "If Ever I Should Leave You" (Alan Jay Lerner, Frederick Loewe) - 4:34
3. "Hills of Love" (Carlos Malcolm, James Shaw) - 5:19
4. "Sophisticated Soul" - 4:39
5. "You're the One" (Adolph Smith) - 4:21
6. "Parker's Mood" (Charlie Parker) - 6:25
7. "Kingsize Man" - 5:57

== Personnel ==
- Hank Crawford - alto saxophone
- Richard Tee - piano (tracks 2–8)
- Pee Wee Ellis - electric piano (track 1)
- Eric Gale, Cornell Dupree - guitar
- Chuck Rainey - electric bass
- Ron Carter - bass
- Bernard Purdie - drums
