= Inner City Blues (Grover Washington Jr. album) =

Studio album by Grover Washington Jr.
- Released: 1972
- Recorded: September 1971
- Studio: Van Gelder Studio, Englewood Cliffs, NJ
- Genre: Jazz
- Length: 35:07
- Label: Kudu; KU-03
- Producer: Creed Taylor

Grover Washington Jr. chronology
Inner City Blues (1972)	All the King's Horses (1972)

Inner City Blues is the debut studio album by saxophonist Grover Washington Jr. It was recorded at the Van Gelder Studio in September 1971 and released in 1972 via Kudu Records.

== Background ==
The title track was a cover of the recent hit by Marvin Gaye released in June 1971. The album also includes a cover of Bill Withers' hit "Ain't No Sunshine", released shortly before recording this album. In 2008, it was reissued on CD by Verve Records.

== Reception ==
Professional ratings
Review scores
Source	Rating
AllMusic	4/5 stars
The Penguin Guide to Jazz Recordings	3.5/4 stars
Record Collector	4/5 stars
The Rolling Stone Jazz Record Guide	2/5 stars

Thom Jurek of AllMusic stated: "This is an amazing debut in so many ways, and it was followed by a run of albums for the label through the end of the '70s when Washington left for Elektra. Inner City Blues remains standing today as a landmark and a turning point in jazz."

== Track listing ==
1. "Inner City Blues" (Marvin Gaye, James Nyx Jr.) – 7:10
2. "Georgia on My Mind" (Hoagy Carmichael, Stuart Gorrell) – 4:38
3. "Mercy Mercy Me (The Ecology)" (Gaye) – 5:07
4. "Ain't No Sunshine" (Bill Withers)/"Theme from Man and Boy" (AKA "Better Days") (J.J. Johnson) – 8:32
5. "Until It's Time for You to Go" (Buffy Saint-Marie) – 4:35
6. "I Loves You Porgy" (George Gershwin, Ira Gershwin, DuBose Heyward) – 5:05

== Personnel ==
- Grover Washington Jr. – alto saxophone, tenor saxophone
- Bob James – electric piano, arrangements and conductor
- Richard Tee – organ
- Eric Gale – guitars
- Ron Carter – basses
- Idris Muhammad – drums
- Airto Moreira – percussion
- Donald Ashworth – baritone saxophone
- Wayne Andre – trombone
- Thad Jones – trumpet, French horn
- Eugene Young – trumpet, flugelhorn
- Hilda Harris – vocals
- Marilyn Jackson – vocals
- Maeretha Stewart – vocals
- Tasha Thomas – vocals

String section

- Maurice Brown, Charles McCracken, Alan Shulman and Anthony Sophos – cello
- Julius Brand, Paul Gershman, Julius Held, Leo Kahn, Harry Katzman, Raoul Poliakin, Max Pollikoff and Paul Winter – violin

Production

- Creed Taylor – producer
- Rudy Van Gelder – engineer
- Bob Ciano – album design
- Steve Salmieri – photography
