= Mr. Blues Plays Lady Soul =

Studio album by Hank Crawford
- Released: 1969
- Recorded: February 12 & 13, 1969; NYC
- Genre: Jazz
- Length: 37:06
- Label: Atlantic; SD 1523
- Producer: Nesuhi Ertegun and Arif Mardin

Hank Crawford chronology
| Double Cross (1968) | Mr. Blues Plays Lady Soul (1969) | It's a Funky Thing to Do (1971) |

Mr. Blues Plays Lady Soul is the sixth album led by saxophonist Hank Crawford featuring performances recorded in 1969 for the Atlantic label.

== Reception ==
Professional ratings
Review scores
| Source | Rating |
|---|---|
| AllMusic | 3/5 stars |

AllMusic awarded the album 3 stars.

== Track listing ==
1. "Groovin'" (Eddie Brigati, Felix Cavaliere) - 2:41
2. "I Can't See Myself Leaving You" (Ronnie Shannon) - 3:32
3. "Never Let Me Go" (Ray Evans, Jay Livingston) - 3:28
4. "Baby I Love You" (Ronnie Shannon) - 3:40
5. "Lady Soul" (Hank Crawford) - 3:12
6. "Soul Serenade" (Curtis Ousley, Luther Dixon) - 3:30
7. "Ain't No Way" (Carolyn Franklin) - 3:37
8. "Since You've Been Gone (Sweet Sweet Baby)" (Aretha Franklin, Teddy White) - 2:16
9. "Take a Look" (Clyde Otis) - 3:13
10. "Going Down Slow" (James Burke Oden) - 7:26

== Personnel ==
- Hank Crawford - alto saxophone
- Bernie Glow, Joe Newman, Ernie Royal, Snooky Young - trumpet (tracks 1, 2, 4–8 & 10)
- Jimmy Cleveland, Benny Powell - trombone (tracks 1–3, 7 & 8)
- Frank Wess - alto saxophone (tracks 1, 2, 4–8 & 10)
- David Newman - tenor saxophone, flute
- Seldon Powell - tenor saxophone (tracks 1, 2, 4–8 & 10)
- Pepper Adams - baritone saxophone (tracks 1, 2, 4–8 & 10)
- Paul Griffin - piano, organ
- Eric Gale - guitar
- Ron Carter (tracks 1, 3 & 7), Jerry Jemmott (tracks 2 & 8), Chuck Rainey (tracks 3–6 & 10) - bass
- Bernard Purdie - drums
- Unidentified string section conducted by Gene Orloff (tracks 3 & 9)
- Arif Mardin - arranger, conductor
