= With Everything I Feel in Me =

1974 studio album by Aretha Franklin

Studio album by Aretha Franklin
- Released: November 25, 1974
- Recorded: January–April, 1974
- Studios: Atlantic, New York City; Criteria, Miami
- Genres: R&B; Soul
- Length: 39:21
- Label: Atlantic (#18116)
- Producers: Aretha Franklin, Arif Mardin, Jerry Wexler, Tom Dowd

Aretha Franklin chronology
Let Me In Your Life (1974)	With Everything I Feel in Me (1974)	You (1975)

Singles from With Everything I Feel in Me
- 1. "Without Love" Released: August 10, 1974; 2. "With Everything I Feel in Me" Released: October 1974

Professional ratings
Review scores
Source	Rating
AllMusic	3/5 stars
Christgau's Record Guide	B+

With Everything I Feel in Me is the twenty-first studio album by American singer Aretha Franklin, released on November 25, 1974, by Atlantic Records.

== Background ==
This recording did not do as well commercially as previous Franklin albums. The LP reached #57 on Billboard's Top Album charts and peaked at #6 on the R&B album charts. None of its singles reached the Top 40 on the Billboard Hot 100. The lead single, "Without Love", written by Aretha's sister Carolyn Franklin and former Motown producer Ivy Jo Hunter, charted at #45 Pop, but fared far better on the R&B charts reaching #6. The title cut also charted at #20 on the R&B charts in early 1975.

Cash Box said that the title song "[builds] slow and steady, it gets into a gorgeous groove with back-up singers, guitar, horns and slinky organ cooking full force under [Franklin's] dynamic vocal."

== Track listing ==
1. "Without Love" (Carolyn Franklin, Ivy Jo Hunter) – 3:47
2. "Don't Go Breaking My Heart" (Burt Bacharach, Hal David) – 4:17
3. "When You Get Right Down to It" (Barry Mann) – 3:55
4. "You'll Never Get to Heaven (If You Break My Heart)" (Burt Bacharach, Hal David) – 5:40
5. "With Everything I Feel in Me" (Aretha Franklin) – 3:53
6. "I Love Every Little Thing About You" (Stevie Wonder) – 3:42
7. "Sing It Again – Say It Again" (Carolyn Franklin) – 3:51
8. "All of These Things" (James Cleveland) – 3:54
9. "You Move Me" (Glen Murdock, Mike Keck) – 6:22

== Personnel ==
- Aretha Franklin – vocals, acoustic piano
- Ken Bichel – synthesizer (3, 6, 7), Fender Rhodes electric piano (4)
- Margaret Branch – background vocals
- Brenda Bryant – background vocals
- Hugh McCracken – guitar (1–6, 8, 9)
- Cornell Dupree – guitar (1–9)
- Gordon Edwards – bass guitar (1, 2)
- Chuck Rainey – bass guitar (3–5, 7–9)
- Bernard Purdie – drums (1–4, 6)
- Grady Tate – drums (5, 9)
- Steve Gadd – drums (7)
- Albhy Galuten – synthesizer (3)
- Hamish Stuart – percussion (7)
- Ralph MacDonald – percussion (7)
- Robbie McIntosh – percussion (7)
- Arif Mardin – string arrangements (1–4), horn arrangements (2, 4, 6, 7), synthesizer arrangements (3)
- The Memphis Horns – horns (5, 9)
  - Andrew Love – tenor saxophone (5, 9), tenor sax solo (9)
  - Ed Logan – tenor saxophone (5, 9)
  - Wayne Jackson – trumpet (5, 9)
  - James Mitchell – baritone saxophone (5, 9)
  - Jack Hale – trombone (5, 9)
- Gene Orloff – concertmaster
- Leon Pendarvis – Hammond organ (7)
- Pat Rebillot – Mellotron (3)
- Pat Smith – background vocals
- Richard Tee – Fender Rhodes electric piano (1–4, 6, 9), Hammond organ (5, 8)

=== Production ===
- Producers – Tom Dowd, Aretha Franklin, Arif Mardin and Jerry Wexler.
- Recorded by Gene Paul (Tracks 1, 2, 5, 7 & 9); Karl Richardson (Tracks 3, 4, 6 & 8).
- Additional Recording – Lew Hahn
- Mixed by Arif Mardin and Gene Paul
- Recorded at Atlantic Studios (New York, NY) and Criteria Studios (Miami, FL).
- Art Direction – Bob Defrin
- Photography – Joel Brodsky
