= Let Me in Your Life =

1974 studio album by Aretha Franklin

Studio album by Aretha Franklin
- Released: February 26, 1974
- Recorded: March 24 – September 7, 1973
- Studios: Atlantic, New York City; A&R, New York City; Criteria, Miami, Florida
- Genre: R&B
- Length: 42:53
- Labels: Atlantic, Rhino
- Producers: Arif Mardin, Jerry Wexler, Aretha Franklin, Tom Dowd

Aretha Franklin chronology
The Best of Aretha Franklin (1973)	Let Me in Your Life (1974)	With Everything I Feel in Me (1974)

Singles from Let Me in Your Life
- 1. "Until You Come Back to Me (That's What I'm Gonna Do)" Released: November 1973; 2. "I'm in Love" Released: April 1974; 3. "Ain't Nothing Like the Real Thing" Released: August 1974

Professional ratings
Review scores
Source	Rating
AllMusic	3/5 stars
Christgau's Record Guide	B+
The Encyclopedia of Popular Music	4/5 stars
The Rolling Stone Album Guide	3/5 stars

Let Me in Your Life is the twentieth studio album by American singer Aretha Franklin, released on February 26, 1974, by Atlantic Records.

Featuring Donny Hathaway on Keyboards

It was one of Franklin's top-selling Atlantic Records albums. The album hit number 1 on Billboard's R&B albums chart and stopped just short of the Top 10 of Billboard's main album chart, narrowly missing Gold certification.

It featured three hit singles and is regarded as one of Franklin's best Atlantic recordings. After many years out of print, it was issued on compact disc through Rhino Records in 1994.

== Track listing ==
Information is based on the album's Liner Notes
Side One

1. "Let Me in Your Life" (Bill Withers) – 3:24
2. "Every Natural Thing" (Eddie Hinton) – 2:31
3. "Ain't Nothing Like the Real Thing" (Nickolas Ashford, Valerie Simpson) – 3:47
4. "I'm in Love" (Bobby Womack) – 2:48
5. "Until You Come Back to Me (That's What I'm Gonna Do)" (Clarence Paul, Stevie Wonder, Morris Broadnax) – 3:26
6. "The Masquerade is Over" (Herbert Magidson, Allie Wrubel) – 4:27

Side Two

1. "With Pen in Hand" (Bobby Goldsboro) – 5:03
2. "Oh Baby" (Aretha Franklin) – 4:55
3. "Eight Days On the Road" (Jerry Ragovoy, Mike Gayle) – 2:59
4. "If You Don't Think" (Aretha Franklin) – 3:50
5. "A Song for You" (Leon Russell) – 5:33

== Personnel ==
Information is based on the album's Liner Notes

Main

- Aretha Franklin – vocals (1, 6, 8, 10, 11, lead on 2–5, 7, 9), acoustic piano (2, 5, 7–9), Fender Rhodes (10, 11)
- Ken Bichel – synthesizer (5)
- Margaret Branch – backing vocals (2, 5, 7, 9)
- Ann S. Clark – backing vocals (2, 5, 7, 9)
- Stan Clarke – bass guitar (1, 3, 4, 6)
- Chuck Rainey – bass guitar (2, 5, 7, 9)
- Willie Weeks – bass guitar (8, 10, 11)
- Judy Clay – backing vocals (3, 4)
- Eumir Deodato – Fender Rhodes (1), acoustic piano
- David Spinozza – guitar (1, 3, 4, 6)
- Cornell Dupree – guitar (2, 4, 7–11)
- Hugh McCracken – guitar (5)
- Gwen Guthrie – backing vocals (4)
- Donny Hathaway – keyboards (3, additional on 7), acoustic piano (4, 6), Fender Rhodes (5, 8)
- Cissy Houston – backing vocals (3, 4)
- Bob James – Hammond organ (1), keyboards (3)
- Ralph MacDonald – percussion (1–4, 6–11)
- Pancho Morales – percussion (2, 5, 6, 8, 9)
- Rick Marotta – drums (1, 3, 4, 6)
- Bernard Purdie – drums (2, 5, 7–11)
- Sylvia Shemwell – backing vocals (3)
- Myrna Smith – backing vocals (3)
- Pat Smith – backing vocals (2, 5, 7, 9)
- Richard Tee – acoustic piano (1, 9), Hammond organ (2, 5, 10, 11), Fender Rhodes (2), synthesizer, additional keyboards (10)
- Deirdre Tuck – backing vocals (4)

Arif Mardin's Horn Section

- Joe Farrell – tenor saxophone (2), flute (5)
- Ernie Royal – trumpet (10)

Arif Mardin's String Section

- Gene Orloff – concertmaster (1, 2, 5, 7–11)

=== Technical personnel ===
- Producers – Aretha Franklin (all tracks); Arif Mardin and Jerry Wexler (1–6, 9); Tom Dowd (7, 8, 10, 11)
- Arrangers – Eumir Deodato (rhythm & strings on 1), William Eaton (music on 3, 4, 6), Arif Mardin (percussion on 1, horns 1, 2, 4, 5, 7–11, strings on 1, 2, 4, 5, 7–11)
- Engineers – Phil Ramone (tracks 1, 3, 4 & 6); Gene Paul (tracks 2 & 8–11); Lew Hahn (Track 5); Howard Albert and Ron Albert (track 7)
- Recorded at Atlantic Studios and A&R Studios (New York City); Criteria Studios (Miami, Florida)
- Remixed by Arif Mardin at Atlantic Studios
- Mastered by Gene Paul at Atlantic Studios
- Photography – Joel Brodsky

== See also ==
- List of number-one R&B albums of 1974 (U.S.)
