= Stingray (album) =

Studio album by Joe Cocker
- Released: 23 April 1976
- Recorded: 1975
- Studios: Dynamic Sound Studios Kingston, Jamaica
- Genres: Rock, reggae
- Length: 46:25
- Label: A&M
- Producer: Rob Fraboni

Joe Cocker chronology
The Best of the Early Joe Cocker (1976)	Stingray (1976)	Live in L.A. (1976)

Professional ratings
Review scores
Source	Rating
AllMusic	3/5 stars
Christgau's Record Guide	C+
The Encyclopedia of Popular Music	3/5 stars
MusicHound Rock: The Essential Album Guide	2/5 stars
The New Rolling Stone Record Guide	3/5 stars

Stingray is the sixth studio album by English singer Joe Cocker, released in 1976. It follows Cocker's pattern of recording mainly cover versions containing just one original song, "Born Thru Indifference". Bob Dylan remained a favourite artist for Cocker to cover with two Dylan songs on this release. Dylan's version of "The Man In Me" appeared on New Morning but "Catfish" would not be released until 1991 on the first volume of The Bootleg Series.

== Critical reception ==
The New Rolling Stone Record Guide wrote that the album "shows signs of renewal, particularly because of the support Cocker gets from the agile pop-soul band, Stuff, and his material, which is better than average."

== Track listing ==
Side one

1. "The Jealous Kind" (Bobby Charles) – 3:48
2. "I Broke Down" (Matthew Moore) – 3:26
3. "You Came Along" (Bobby Charles) – 3:48
4. "Catfish" (Bob Dylan, Jacques Levy) – 5:20
5. "Moon Dew" (Matthew Moore) – 5:50

Side two

1. "The Man in Me" (Bob Dylan) – 3:40
2. "She Is My Lady" (George S. Clinton) – 4:34
3. "Worrier" (Matthew Moore) – 3:15
4. "Born Thru Indifference" (Joe Cocker, Richard Tee) – 6:15
5. "A Song for You" (Leon Russell) – 6:29

== Personnel ==
- Joe Cocker – lead vocals, percussion
- Richard Tee – keyboards, arrangements (1–5, 7–10), organ solo (5)
- Cornell Dupree – guitar, guitar solo (1)
- Albert Lee – guitar solo (3)
- Eric Gale – guitar, guitar solo (4, 5, 7), arrangements (4)
- Eric Clapton – guitar solo (8)
- Gordon Edwards – bass
- Steve Gadd – drums, percussion
- Felix "Flaco" Falcon – congas (1, 2)
- Sam Rivers – soprano saxophone solo (1)
- Rob Fraboni – arrangements (4, 6)
- Tyrone Downie – arrangements (6)
- Peter Tosh – arrangements (6)
- Lani Groves – backing vocals (2, 6, 7)
- Phylliss Lindsey – backing vocals (2, 6, 9)
- Maxine Willard Waters – backing vocals (2, 6)
- Deniece Williams – backing vocals (2, 6)
- Patti Austin – backing vocals (7, 9)
- Brenda White – backing vocals (7, 9)
- Bonnie Bramlett – backing vocals (8)
- Gwen Guthrie – backing vocals (9)
- Carlton 'Carlie' Barrett – drums (6)
- Aston "Family Man" Barrett – bass guitar (6)

== Production ==
- Producer – Rob Fraboni
- Associate Producers – Mark Aglietti and Richard Tee
- Engineers – Baker Bigsby, Neil Case and Rob Fraboni
- Recorded at Dynamic Sound Studios (Kingston, Jamaica)
- Mixed at The Village Recorder (Los Angeles, CA)
- Mastered by Bernie Grundman at A&M Studios (Hollywood, CA)
- Design – Bob Cato at Skybow
- Cover Photo and Inside Color Photos – S.L.O.P.
- Back Cover – Lee Jaffe

== Chart performance ==
Year	Chart	Position
1976	US Billboard	70
