= We Got a Good Thing Going =

Studio album by Hank Crawford
- Released: 1972
- Recorded: September 21 & 28 and October 10, 1972
- Studio: Van Gelder Studio in Englewood Cliffs, NJ
- Genre: Jazz
- Length: 38:11
- Label: Kudu; KU-08
- Producer: Creed Taylor

Hank Crawford chronology
Help Me Make It Through the Night (1972)	We Got a Good Thing Going (1972)	Wildflower (1973)

We Got a Good Thing Going is the thirteenth album led by the saxophonist Hank Crawford and his second release on the Kudu label.

== Reception ==
Professional ratings
Review scores
Source	Rating
AllMusic	4/5 stars

AllMusic awarded the album 4 stars stating, "Of Hank Crawford's somewhat erratic output for Kudu during 1971-78, this is the album to get. The Don Sebesky arrangements for strings and an oversized rhythm section fit Crawford's soulful style well and the altoist performs consistently strong material that was also commercially successful".

== Track listing ==
1. "We Got a Good Thing Going" (The Corporation) - 6:00
2. "I Don't Know" (Bill Withers) - 4:20
3. "Down to Earth" (Ron Miller, Avery Vandenberg) - 3:25
4. "I'm Just a Lucky So-and-So" (Duke Ellington, Mack David) - 6:55
5. "Imagination" (Jimmy Van Heusen, Johnny Burke) - 3:15
6. "Little Tear" (Don Sebesky) - 3:33
7. "The Christmas Song" (Mel Tormé, Robert Wells) - 3:38
8. "Winter Wonderland" (Felix Bernard, Richard B. Smith) - 3:35
9. "Alone Again (Naturally)" (Gilbert O'Sullivan) - 3:30
10. "Dirt Dobbler" (Alfred Ellis) - 3:32
11. "Betcha by Golly, Wow" (Thom Bell, Linda Creed) - 5:10
12. "This Is All I Ask" (Gordon Jenkins) - 3:41
13. "Jazz Bridge" (Sebesky) - 2:50

== Personnel ==
- Hank Crawford - alto saxophone
- Richard Tee - piano, electric piano, organ
- George Benson, Cornell Dupree - electric guitar
- Ron Carter, Gordon Edwards - double bass, electric bass
- Bernard Purdie - drums
- Phil Kraus - vibraphone, orchestra bells
- Art Jenkins - congas, tambourine
- Max Ellen, Paul Gershman, Emanuel Green, Harold Kohon, Harry Lookofsky, Joe Malin, David Nadien, Elliot Rosoff, Irving Spice - violin
- Al Brown, Harold Coletta, Ted Israel - viola
- Charles McCracken, George Ricci - cello
- Margaret Ross - harp
- Bob James, Don Sebesky - arranger, conductor
