= The Man with the Sad Face =

Studio album by Stanley Turrentine
- Released: 1976
- Recorded: August 25–28 & September 27–28, 1976 at Generation Sound Studios, New York City
- Genre: Jazz
- Length: 34:04
- Label: Fantasy F-9519
- Producer: Stanley Turrentine

Stanley Turrentine chronology
Everybody Come On Out (1976)	The Man with the Sad Face (1976)	Nightwings (1977)

The Man with the Sad Face is an album by jazz saxophonist Stanley Turrentine recorded for the Fantasy label in 1976 and featuring performances by Turrentine with an orchestra arranged and conducted by David Van De Pitte. The album consists of Turrentine's versions of many current pop and disco hits.

== Reception ==
The Allmusic review by Michael Erlewine simply stated "Very large group session for Fantasy".

Professional ratings
Review scores
Source	Rating
Allmusic	2.5/5 stars
The Rolling Stone Jazz Record Guide	2/5 stars

== Track listing ==
1. "Evil Ways" (Clarence "Sonny" Henry) - 4:37
2. "Man with the Sad Face" (Henry) - 4:21
3. "Ligia" (Antônio Carlos Jobim) - 5:50
4. "You'll Never Find Another Love Like Mine" (Kenny Gamble, Leon Huff) - 5:20
5. "I Want You" (Arthur Ross, Leon Ware) - 3:39
6. "Whatever Possessed Me" (Tadd Dameron) - 5:35
7. "Love Hangover" (Marilyn McLeod, Pam Sawyer) - 3:48
8. "Mighty High" (David Crawford, Richard Downing) - 0:54

== Personnel ==
- Stanley Turrentine - tenor saxophone
- Jon Faddis, Lew Soloff, Tommy Turrentine - trumpet, flugelhorn
- Wayne Andre, Tom Malone, Barry Rogers - trombone
- Peter Phillips - bass trombone
- Jim Buffington, Bob Carlisle - French horn
- George Young - alto saxophone, flute, bass flute, piccolo
- Lew Del Gatto - baritone saxophone, English horn, flute, oboe
- Dave Carey - vibraphone (tracks 3, 5 & 7)
- Paul Griffin - piano, electric piano
- John Miller - piano (tracks 2 & 6)
- Richard Trifan - synthesizer (tracks 1, 5 & 7)
- Cornell Dupree, Eric Gale - guitar
- Ron Carter (tracks 2 & 3), Buster Williams (track 6) - bass
- Bob Babbitt - electric bass
- Charles Collins - drums
- Idris Muhammad - drums (tracks 2 & 6)
- Errol "Crusher" Bennett - congas, percussion
- Julius Brand, Norman Carr, Peter Dimitriades, Emanuel Green, Harold Kohon, Guy Lumia, Joseph Malignaggi, Gene Orloff, Raoul Poliakin, Tony Posk, Aaron Rosand - violin
- La Mar Aslop, Julien Barber, Theodore Israel, Richard Maximoff, Mitsue Takayama - viola
- Maurice Bialkin, Ted Hoyle, Jesse Levy, Anthony Sophos - cello
- Gene Orloff - concertmaster
- David Van De Pitte - arranger, conductor
- Vivian Cherry, Lani Groves, Maeretha Stewart, Kenny Williams - backing vocals
- Tony May - recording engineer, mixing engineer
