= New Arrangement =

Studio album by Jackie DeShannon
- Released: September 1975
- Studio: Devonshire (Los Angeles, California)
- Genre: Folk, country, pop, rock
- Length: 35:55; 52:59 (reissue)
- Label: Columbia
- Producer: Michael Stewart

Jackie DeShannon chronology
Your Baby Is a Lady (1974)	New Arrangement (1975)	The Very Best of Jackie DeShannon (compilation) (1975)

Professional ratings
Review scores
Source	Rating
AllMusic	3.5/5 stars
Christgau's Record Guide	B−

New Arrangement is an album by Jackie DeShannon, released by Columbia Records (PC 33500) in 1975. It contains the first recording of "Bette Davis Eyes", written by Donna Weiss and Jackie DeShannon in 1974 and later turned into a massive hit by Kim Carnes on the album Mistaken Identity (1981). Another song, "Boat to Sail," that features Brian Wilson and then-wife Marilyn singing backing vocals, was covered by The Carpenters in their 1976 album A Kind of Hush. Robert Christgau wrote about New Arrangement: "As an American songwriter who has escaped the confessional mode, and as a woman who can sing about subjects other than men, DeShannon exemplifies several healthy trends. The main thing this well-made record reveals, however, is an intelligent professionalism that matters about as much as a surge in enrollment in creative writing classes or women's liberation for female executives."

== Track listing ==
1. "Let the Sailors Dance" (Randy Edelman, DeShannon) – 4:00
2. "Boat to Sail" (DeShannon) – 3:30
3. "Sweet Baby Gene" (DeShannon, Donna Terry Weiss) – 2:53
4. "A New Arrangement" (Glen Ballentyne, DeShannon) – 3:16
5. "Over My Head Again" (John Bettis, DeShannon) – 3:00
6. "Bette Davis Eyes" (Donna Terry Weiss, DeShannon) – 2:45
7. "Queen of the Rodeo" (Donna Terry Weiss, DeShannon) – 3:20
8. "I Wanted It All" (John Bettis, DeShannon) – 2:48
9. "Murphy" (Glen Ballentyne, DeShannon) – 3:11
10. "Barefoot Boys and Barefoot Girls" (DeShannon, Donna Terry Weiss) – 3:04
11. "Dreamin' as One" (David Palmer, William "Smitty" Smith) – 3:30

=== CD bonus tracks ===
12. "Pure Natural Love" (Jackie DeShannon) – 2:45
13. "Deep into Paradise" (John Bettis, DeShannon) – 3:42
14. "Somebody Turn the Music On" (John Bettis, DeShannon) – 3:39
15. "All Night Desire" (John Bettis, DeShannon) – 3:34
16. "Fire in the City" (John Bettis, DeShannon) – 3:25

== Personnel ==
- Jackie DeShannon – guitar, vocals
- Joe Clayton – conga, cymbal
- Jesse Ed Davis – guitar
- Mike Deasy – guitar
- John Kahn – bass
- Larry Knechtel – keyboards
- Michael Stewart – guitar
- Ron Tutt – drums
- Waddy Wachtel – guitar
- Laura Creamer – background vocals
- Mark Creamer – background vocals
- Susan Steward – background vocals

Additional personnel

- Bob Claire – flute (3)
- Mark Creamer – guitar (7)
- Gary Dalton – electric guitar and solo (4)https://www.facebook.com/gary.dalton.9883
- Randy Edelman – piano (1, 2)
- Buddy Emmons – steel guitar (5, 6)
- Barry Fasman – Moog synthesizer
- Victor Feldman – vibes (3)
- Larry Knechtel – string ARP solo (11)
- Peter Marshall – bass (3)
- Kenny Rankin – guitar (3)
- Seychelles Singers – vocals (10)
- Leland Sklar – bass (11)
- Brian Wilson – background vocals (2)
- Marilyn Rovell Wilson – background vocals (2)
- Michael Stewart – producer, arranger
- Nick DeCaro – string arrangements (1)
- Jimmie Haskell – string arrangements (11)
- Steve Madeo – arranger
- Ron Malo – recording
