= Alice Clark (singer) =

American singer

- Clark on the cover of her self-titled LP for Mainstream Records

Background information
- Born: c. 1947
- Origin: Brooklyn, New York, U.S.
- Died: April 2004
- Genres: Soul
- Occupation: Singer
- Years active: 1968–1972
- Labels: Jubilee, Mainstream, Warner Bros.-Seven Arts

Alice Clark (c. 1947– April 2004) was an American soul singer, who had little commercial success during her lifetime. By the 1990s, however, she was being recognized as one of soul's great unsung talents by the acid jazz fraternity. Her reputation was further confirmed by the 2010 release of The Complete Studio Recordings 1968-1972 by Ace Records.

== Biography ==
Little is known publicly of Clark's life outside of her brief music career, which lasted between 1968 and 1972. She grew up in the Bedford-Stuyvesant neighborhood of the New York City borough of Brooklyn. Billy Vera, who wrote and produced her first record, said of her: "I got the impression her life wasn't that great. She... had kids and belonged to a religious order that forbade either bathing or washing hair, I don't recall exactly which..."

Her first record, pairing two Vera songs, "You Got a Deal" and "Say You'll Never (Never Leave Me)", was recorded in 1968 at the Jubilee Records studio, with musicians including Vera and Butch Mann (guitars), Jimmy Tyrell (bass), Earl Williams (drums), and Money Johnson (trumpet). Produced by Vera, it was released on the Rainy Day label owned by Chip Taylor and Al Gorgoni. Later the same year, Clark recorded "You Hit Me (Right Where It Hurt Me)" and "Heaven's Will (Must Be Obeyed)", both arranged by Richard Tee and produced by George Kerr. Released on Warner Bros.-Seven Arts Records, "You Hit Me" – co-written by Sylvia Moy and first recorded by Kim Weston at Motown – was not a hit at the time.

In 1972, Bob Shad of Mainstream Records signed Clark to record an LP with arranger Ernie Wilkins. Produced by Shad, the album, titled Alice Clark, was recorded at the Record Plant in New York and included three songs written by Bobby Hebb, as well as Jimmy Webb's "I Keep It Hid" (also issued as a single), Juanita Fleming's "Never Did I Stop Loving You", and John Bromley and Petula Clark's "Looking at Life". The session musicians on the album included guitarist Cornell Dupree, keyboardist Paul Griffin, and drummer Bernard "Pretty" Purdie. However, the record sold unsuccessfully once again, and Clark made no more recordings.

She retired from the music industry after the commercial failure of the album, and returned to family life in Bedford-Stuyvesant. She died from cancer in 2004, aged 57.

== Legacy ==
In Britain, "You Hit Me (Right Where It Hurt Me)" became a staple of the Northern soul scene in the early 1970s, valued both for its rarity and its quality as "a classic piece of uptown soul". Her album also became highly valued and collectible, later claimed as "delivered with understated passion and appealing vulnerability", "astonishing", "sublime", "perhaps one of the finest soul albums ever recorded" and "the Holy Grail of modern soul", in which "every single element - the singer, the songs, the musicians, the production - are simply superb...[and] the whole is even greater than the sum of the parts."

A compilation of her recordings was released on compact disc in 2010, and her eponymous LP was reissued on vinyl in 2019. Additionally, her song "Never Did I Stop Loving You" from that album was featured in the 2020 film The King of Staten Island.
