= Wildflower (Hank Crawford album) =

Studio album by Hank Crawford
- Released: 1973
- Recorded: June 28 & 29, 1973
- Studio: Van Gelder Studio in Englewood Cliffs, NJ
- Genre: Jazz
- Length: 31:51
- Label: Kudu; KU-15
- Producer: Creed Taylor

Hank Crawford chronology
We Got a Good Thing Going (1972)	Wildflower (1973)	Don't You Worry 'bout a Thing (1975)

Wildflower is the fourteenth album led by saxophonist Hank Crawford and his third released on the Kudu label in 1973.

== Reception ==
Professional ratings
Review scores
Source	Rating
AllMusic	4/5 stars

AllMusic awarded the album 4 stars stating "Wildflower is indispensable as a shining example of '70s groove jazz at its best".

== Track listing ==
1. "Corazón" (Carole King) – 6:03
2. "Wildflower" (Doug Edwards, David Richardson) – 3:57
3. "Mr. Blues" (Hank Crawford) – 6:07
4. "You've Got It Bad Girl" (Stevie Wonder, Yvonne Wright) – 9:37
5. "Good Morning Heartache" (Irene Higginbotham, Ervin Drake, Dan Fisher) – 6:07

== Personnel ==
- Hank Crawford – alto saxophone
- Bernie Glow – trumpet, flugelhorn
- Alan Rubin, Marvin Stamm – trumpet
- Tony Studd – trombone, bass trombone
- Wayne Andre, Paul Faulise – trombone
- Jimmy Buffington, Brooks Tillotson – French horn
- Richard Tee – electric piano, organ
- Joe Beck – electric guitar
- Bob Cranshaw – bass, electric bass
- Idris Muhammad – drums
- Rubens Bassini, George Devens, Dave Friedman, Arthur Jenkins, Phil Kraus, Ralph MacDonald – percussion
- Hilda Harris, Maeretha Stewart, Randy Peyton, Bill Eaton – vocals (track 2)
- Bob James – arranger, conductor

== Samples ==
- The second song Wildflower has been sampled by various Hip-Hop artists, including the likes of Eminem for his song “No One’s Iller” from his first EP “The Slim Shady EP” (1997), 2pac’s “Shorty Wanna Be A Thug” from his album “All Eyez On Me” (1996), and G Herbo with his song “Went Legit” from his most recent album “Greatest Rapper Alive” (2025). it has also been sampled by Paul Wall, Ye (Formerly known as Kanye West) and GLC in their song Drive Slow (2005)
