= Help Me Make It Through the Night (Hank Crawford album) =

Studio album by Hank Crawford
- Released: 1972
- Recorded: August 1971 and January 1972
- Studio: Van Gelder Studio in Englewood Cliffs, NJ
- Genre: Jazz
- Length: 33:02
- Label: Kudu; KU-06
- Producer: Creed Taylor

Hank Crawford chronology
| It's a Funky Thing to Do (1971) | Help Me Make It Through the Night (1972) | We Got a Good Thing Going (1972) |

Help Me Make It Through the Night is the twelfth album led by saxophonist Hank Crawford and his first released on the Kudu label in 1972.

== Reception ==
Professional ratings
Review scores
| Source | Rating |
|---|---|
| AllMusic | 4/5 stars |

AllMusic awarded the album 4 stars stating "This 1972 set by Crawford is an exemplary portrait of his movin' and groovin' style".

== Track listing ==
1. "Help Me Make It Through the Night" (Kris Kristofferson) - 5:40
2. "Brian's Song" (Michel Legrand) - 3:25
3. "Uncle Funky" (Hank Crawford) - 5:32
4. "In the Wee Small Hours of the Morning" (John Moon Elliott, Inez James) - 2:48
5. "Go Away Little Girl" (Gerry Goffin, Carole King) - 4:20
6. "Imagine" (John Lennon) - 4:05
7. "Ham" (Pee Wee Ellis) - 3:07
8. "The Sun Died" (Hubert Giraud, Pierre Delanoë, Ray Charles, Ann Gregory) - 4:05

== Personnel ==
- Hank Crawford - alto saxophone
- Al DeRisi, Snooky Young - trumpet (track 7)
- Wayne Andre - trombone (track 7)
- Grover Washington, Jr. - tenor saxophone (track 7)
- Pepper Adams - baritone saxophone (track 7)
- Richard Tee - piano, electric piano, organ
- Cornell Dupree (tracks 1–6 & 8), Eric Gale (track 7) - electric guitar
- Ron Carter - bass, electric bass
- Phil Kraus - vibraphone (tracks 1, 4 & 5)
- Idris Muhammad (track 7), Bernard Purdie (tracks 1–6 & 8) - drums
- Airto Moreira - percussion (track 7)
- Bernard Eichen, Felix Giglio, Emanuel Green, Harold Kohon, Harry Lookofsky, Joe Malin, Gene Orloff, Max Polikoff, Rlliot Rosoff - violin (tracks 1–6 & 8)
- Alfred Brown, Theodore Israel, Emanuel Vardi - viola (tracks 1–6 & 8)
- Charles McCracken, George Ricci - cello (tracks 1–6 & 8)
- Pee Wee Ellis (track 7), Don Sebesky (tracks 1–6 & 8) - arranger, conductor
