= End of a Rainbow =

1976 album by Patti Austin

Studio album by Patti Austin
- Released: August 6, 1976
- Recorded: April–June 1976
- Studio: Mediasound (New York City); Van Gelder Studios (Englewood, New Jersey)
- Genre: R&B
- Length: 38:02
- Label: CTI 5001
- Producer: Creed Taylor

Patti Austin chronology
End of a Rainbow (1976)	Havana Candy (1977)

Professional ratings
Review scores
Source	Rating
Allmusic	3/5 stars

End of a Rainbow is the debut studio album by American vocalist and songwriter Patti Austin, released in August 1976 through CTI.

== Track listing ==
All compositions by Patti Austin except where noted

1. "Say You Love Me" – 5:45
2. "In My Life" – 4:18
3. "You Don't Have to Say You're Sorry" – 3:37
4. "More Today Than Yesterday" (Patrick Upton) – 5:29
5. "Give It Time" – 3:07
6. "There Is No Time" – 3:28
7. "What's at the End of a Rainbow" – 2:50
8. "This Side of Heaven" – 3:03
9. "Sweet Sadie the Savior" – 6:25

== Personnel ==
- Patti Austin – vocals
- Richard Tee – keyboards (1, 2, 4–6, 8, 9)
- Barry Miles – synthesizers (1, 8)
- Mike Abene – acoustic piano (3, 7)
- Eric Gale – guitars (1, 2, 4–6, 8, 9)
- Steve Khan – guitars (3, 7)
- Will Lee – electric bass (1, 4)
- Jeff Berlin – electric bass (2, 6, 8)
- Chuck Rainey – electric bass (5, 9)
- Steve Gadd – drums (1, 2, 4, 5, 9)
- Andy Newmark – drums (6, 8)
- Ralph MacDonald – percussion (1, 2, 4–6, 8, 9)
- Michael Brecker – tenor saxophone (2, 4, 5)
- Ronnie Cuber – baritone saxophone (9)
- Joe Farrell – tenor saxophone (9)
- Randy Brecker – trumpet (4, 5)
- Vivian Cherry – backing vocals
- Frank Floyd – backing vocals
- Gwen Guthrie – backing vocals
- Zachary Sanders – backing vocals

String section

- David Matthews – arrangements
- Bob James – conductor
- Charles McCracken and Alan Shulman – cello
- Chuck Israels – double bass
- Gloria Agostini – harp (3, 7)
- Alfred Brown, Theodore Israel and Emanuel Vardi – viola
- Harry Cykman, Max Ellen, Barry Finclair, Paul Gershman, Harry Glickman, Emanuel Green, Harold Kohon, Harry Lookofsky, Guy Lumia, Joe Malin, David Nadien, Max Pollikoff, Matthew Raimondi and Richard Sortomme – violin

=== Production ===
- Creed Taylor – producer
- Rudy Van Gelder – mixing, engineer (3, 7)
- Joe Jorgensen – engineer (1, 2, 4–6, 8, 9)
- Alan Varner – engineer (1, 2, 4–6, 8, 9)
- Rene Schumacher – album design
- Pete Turner – front cover photography
- Jim Hadley – liner photography
