= New York Connection =

Studio album by Tom Scott
- Released: 8 December 1975 (US); 2 April 1976 (UK)
- Recorded: August 25–29, 1975
- Studio: The Hit Factory (New York City, New York); A&M Studios (Hollywood, California)
- Genre: Jazz fusion
- Length: 45:14
- Label: Ode
- Producer: Tom Scott; Hank Cicalo

Professional ratings
Review scores
Source	Rating
Allmusic	2.5/5 stars
The Rolling Stone Jazz Record Guide	1/5 stars

New York Connection is an album by American musician Tom Scott that was released by Ode in December 1975 with a UK release following in April 1976. It entered the Billboard 200 on 20 December to begin a chart stay of 25 weeks, peaking at number 42.

In contrast with the Los Angeles-based Scott's previous projects, the nine-song set features New York musicians such as Hugh McCracken, Richard Tee, Eric Gale, and Steve Gadd. Following their North American tour together in November−December 1974, George Harrison makes a contribution on the track "Appolonia (Foxtrata)".

== Track listing ==
All songs composed and arranged by Tom Scott, except where noted.

1. "Dirty Old Man" – 5:20
2. "Uptown & Country" – 6:19
3. "New York Connection" – 4:24
4. "Garden" (Ackerman, Michel Colombier) – 5:37
5. "Time and Love" (Ralph MacDonald, Laura Nyro, William Salter) – 4:33
6. "Midtown Rush" – 4:47
7. "Looking Out for Number 7" – 5:34
8. "Appolonia (Foxtrata)" – 3:59
9. "You're Gonna Need Me" (Richard Tee) – 4:40

== Personnel ==
- Tom Scott – tenor saxophone (1, 5, 7, 9), Moog synthesizer (1, 7), saxophones (2, 6), Lyricon (2, 7, 8), soprano saxophone (3, 4, 8), woodwinds (3, 4), ARP String Ensemble (4–7), flute (5, 7, 8), baritone saxophone (9)
- Richard Tee – keyboards
- Bob James – electric piano (3, 4, 7)
- Eric Gale – guitars, guitar solo (1), bass (9)
- Hugh McCracken – guitars, slide guitar (2), harmonica (2)
- George Harrison – slide guitar (8)
- Gary King – bass (1–8)
- Steve Gadd – drums
- Ralph MacDonald – percussion
- Dick Hyde – trombone (9), bass trumpet (9)
- Chuck Findley – trumpet (9)

=== Production ===
- Tom Scott – producer, arrangements
- Hank Cicolo – producer, engineer
- Milt Calice – assistant engineer
- Kevin Herron – assistant engineer
- Chuck Beeson – album design
- Jim McCrary – photography
