= Klik Records =

Music label based in London

Klik Records was a music label based in London, England. It was founded in 1975 by former Trojan Records employees Joe Sinclair and Desmond Bryan, along with Larry Sevitt. Klik described itself as a "progressive Black Music Company, specialising in rebel-dread Reggae, modern Soul and Disco sounds."

Before the company's demise in 1977, it released several dozen singles and albums which were distributed first by Island Records, and then RCA Records. Among the artists whose recordings it released in the UK were Willie Lindo, Tapper Zukie, Delroy Washington, Bag-O-Wire, Cornell Campbell, The Abyssinians, Bunny Scott (later known as Bunny Rugs), Lee "Scratch" Perry, The Upsetters, King Tubby And The Aggrovators ("Shalom Dub"), Barrington Spence, U Brown, Big Youth, John Holt, Jackie Edwards, Pablo Moses, The Slickers and Eric Gale. Most Klik products were originally recorded in Jamaica for release by other labels.

In 1977, Klik Records’ Joe Sinclair contributed to the early punk rock scene in London, producing Mark Perry's ( of Sniffing Glue ) roots-rock influenced discomix, Alternative TV’s Life After Life-Life After Dub.

Klik Records ceased operations in 1977.
