= Young, Gifted and Black =

1972 studio album by Aretha Franklin

Studio album by Aretha Franklin
- Released: January 24, 1972
- Recorded: August 12, 1970 – February 16, 1971
- Studios: Atlantic, New York City; Criteria, Miami
- Genre: Soul
- Length: 44:46
- Labels: Atlantic; Rhino
- Producers: Tom Dowd; Arif Mardin; Jerry Wexler

Aretha Franklin chronology
Aretha's Greatest Hits (1971)	Young, Gifted and Black (1972)	Amazing Grace (1972)

Singles from Young, Gifted and Black
- 1. "Border Song (Holy Moses)" Released: 1970; 2. "Brand New Me" Released: March 19, 1971; 3. "Rock Steady"/"Oh Me Oh My (I'm a Fool for You Baby)" Released: October 11, 1971; 4. "Young, Gifted and Black" Released: January 18, 1972; 5. "Day Dreaming"/"I've Been Loving You Too Long" Released: February 1972; 6. "All the King's Horses"/"April Fools" Released: 1972

Professional ratings
Review scores
Source	Rating
AllMusic	4.5/5 stars
Christgau's Record Guide	A
Rolling Stone	3.5/5 stars

Young, Gifted and Black is the eighteenth studio album by American singer-songwriter Aretha Franklin, released in early 1972, by Atlantic Records. The album reached #2 on Billboard's R&B albums survey and peaked at #11 on the main album chart. It was quickly certified Gold by the RIAA. Its title was cut from "To Be Young, Gifted and Black", recorded and released by Nina Simone in 1969.

Franklin won a 1972 Grammy Award for Best Female R&B Vocal Performance.

In 2003, the television network VH1 named it the 76th greatest album of all time. In 2020, it was ranked number 388 by Rolling Stone in their list of the 500 Greatest Albums of All Time.

== Songs ==
Young, Gifted and Black contains original songs written and performed by Franklin, such as "Day Dreaming" and "Rock Steady". It also features cover versions of songs by other artists, including "To Be Young, Gifted and Black" by Nina Simone, as well as "I've Been Loving You Too Long" by Otis Redding, "The Long and Winding Road" by the Beatles, and "Border Song (Holy Moses)" by Elton John.

== Critical reception ==
Jason Birchmeier of AllMusic wrote that "Young, Gifted and Black certainly ranks highly among [Franklin's] studio efforts, with many arguing that it may be her greatest. [...] If you really want to go song by song, you'd be hard-pressed to find any throwaways here — this is quite honestly an album that merits play from beginning to end".

In 2003, the television network VH1 named Young, Gifted and Black the 76th greatest album of all time. In 2020, the album was ranked number 388 by Rolling Stone in its list of the 500 Greatest Albums of All Time.

In 2018, Rolling Stone writer Rob Sheffield praised Franklin's cover of "The Long and Winding Road" from the album as "the greatest of all Beatle covers — the one that improves most on the original and defines everything the song is about".

== Track listing ==
Side one
No.	Title	Writer(s)	Length
1.	"Oh Me Oh My (I'm a Fool for You Baby)"	Jim Doris	3:42
2.	"Day Dreaming"	Aretha Franklin	4:00
3.	"Rock Steady"	Aretha Franklin	3:15
4.	"Young, Gifted and Black"	Nina Simone; Weldon Irvine	3:34
5.	"All the King's Horses"	Aretha Franklin	3:56
6.	"A Brand New Me"	Theresa Bell; Jerry Butler; Kenneth Gamble	4:26

Side two
No.	Title	Writer(s)	Length
7.	"April Fools"	Burt Bacharach; Hal David	3:29
8.	"I've Been Loving You Too Long"	Otis Redding; Jerry Butler	3:36
9.	"First Snow in Kokomo"	Aretha Franklin	4:04
10.	"The Long and Winding Road"	John Lennon; Paul McCartney	3:38
11.	"Didn't I (Blow Your Mind This Time)"	Thom Bell; William Hart	3:42
12.	"Border Song (Holy Moses)"	Elton John; Bernie Taupin	3:22

== Personnel ==
- Aretha Franklin – lead vocals (all), acoustic piano (1–4, 6, 8–12), celesta (5), Fender Rhodes electric piano (7)
- Cornell Dupree – guitar (2–5, 7–12)
- Hugh McCracken – guitar (1, 6)
- Don Arnone – acoustic guitar (2)
- Donny Hathaway – Hammond organ (1, 3, 5, 6, 8, 9), Fender Rhodes electric piano (2)
- Billy Preston – Hammond organ (4, 10, 12)
- Chuck Rainey – bass guitar (2–5, 7, 9–12)
- Eric Gale – bass guitar (1, 6)
- Robert Popwell – bass guitar (8), percussion (3)
- Bernard Purdie – drums (2, 3, 5, 7, 8, 11)
- Ray Lucas – drums (4, 10, 12)
- Al Jackson Jr. – drums (1, 6)
- Dr. John – percussion (3)
- The Memphis Horns – horns (3, 8)
- Neal Rosengarden – trumpet (9), vibraphone (5)
- Hubert Laws – flute (2, 7, 11)
- Pat Smith – backing vocals (2, 3, 5, 7–9, 11)
- Carolyn Franklin – backing vocals (2, 3, 5, 8–10)
- Erma Franklin – backing vocals (2, 3, 5, 8–10)
- Margaret Branch – backing vocals (2, 3, 5, 7–11)
- Ann S. Clark – backing vocals (2, 3, 5, 7–9, 11)
- The Sweet Inspirations – backing vocals (1, 4, 6, 12)
- Ronald Bright – backing vocals (12)
- J. R. Bailey – backing vocals (12)
- Sammy Turner – backing vocals (12)

== Production ==
Day Dreaming, Rock Steady, All The Kings Horses, I've Been Loving You Too Long, First Snow In Kokomo were recorded at Criteria Studios in Miami, Florida. Recording Engineers: Ron Albert and Howard Albert, and Chuck Kirkpatrick. Produced by Jerry Wexler, Tom Dowd and Arif Mardin

== Chart positions ==
Chart (1972)	Peak position
US Billboard 200	11
US Top R&B/Hip-Hop Albums (Billboard)	2

=== Singles ===
Year	Title	US Pop	US R&B
1970	"Border Song (Holy Moses)"	37	5
1971	"Rock Steady"	9	2
1972	"All the King's Horses"	26	7
1972	"Day Dreaming"	5	1
1972	"Oh Me Oh My (I'm a Fool for You Baby)"	73	9
