= Cornell Dupree =

American R&B/soul jazz guitarist (1942–2011)

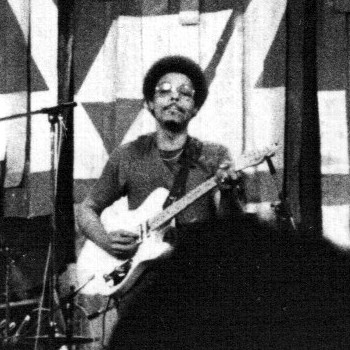
- Dupree performing in 1976

Background information
- Born: Cornell Luther Dupree; December 19, 1942; Fort Worth, Texas, U.S.
- Died: May 8, 2011 (aged 68) Fort Worth, Texas
- Genres: Jazz fusion, soul jazz, smooth jazz, crossover jazz, R&B
- Occupation: Musician
- Instrument: Guitar
- Labels: Wounded Bird, Antilles, Kokopelli, Dialtone

Cornell Luther Dupree (December 19, 1942 – May 8, 2011) was an American jazz fusion and R&B guitarist. He worked at various times with Miles Davis, Aretha Franklin, Bill Withers, Donny Hathaway, King Curtis, and Steve Gadd, appeared on Late Night with David Letterman, and wrote a book on soul and blues guitar, Rhythm and Blues Guitar. He reportedly recorded on 2,500 sessions.

== Biography ==
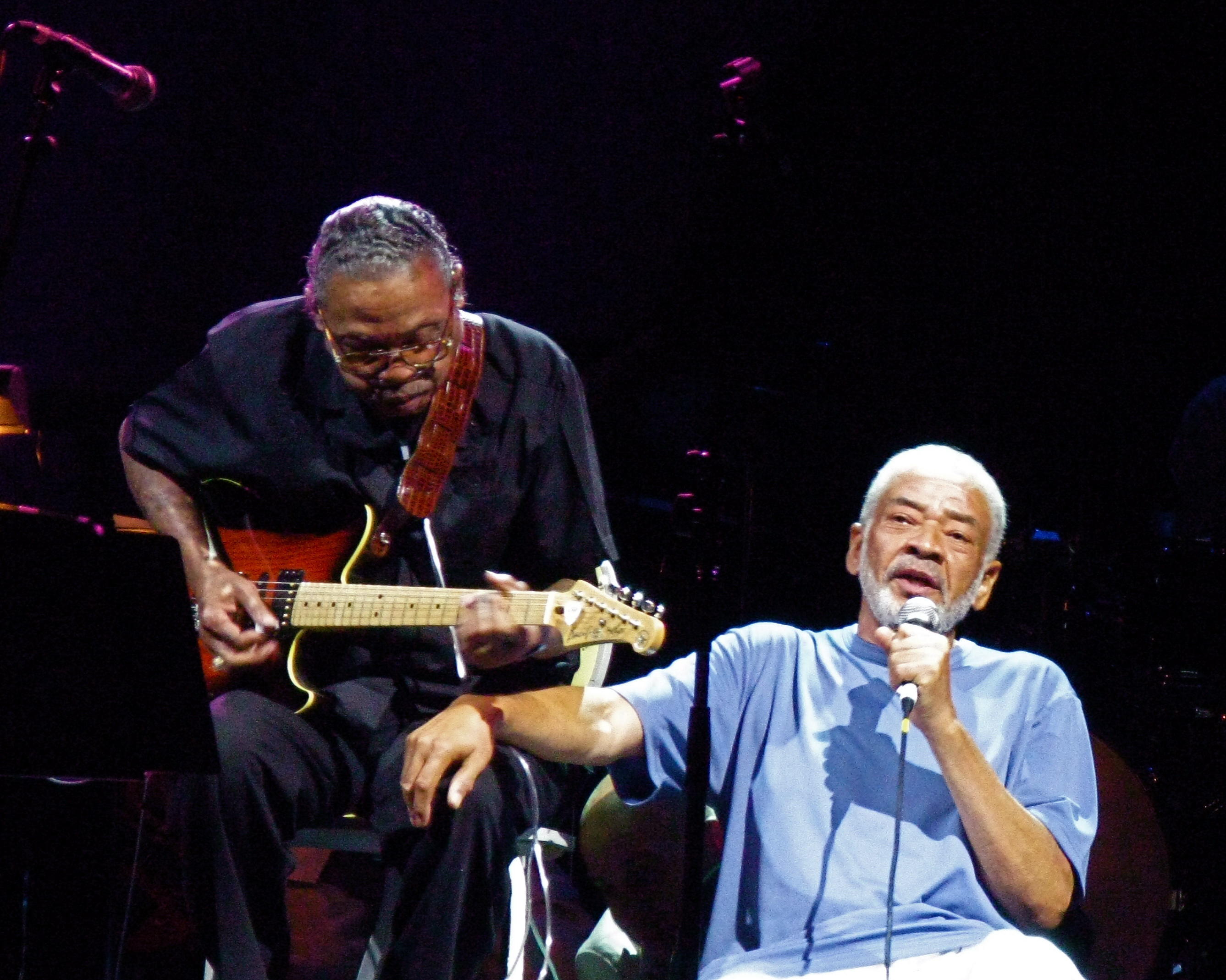
Dupree at a 2008 tribute concert for Bill Withers, performing with the singer

Dupree was born and raised in Fort Worth, Texas, where he graduated from I.M. Terrell High School. He began his career playing in the studio band for Atlantic Records, recording albums by Aretha Franklin (Aretha Live at Fillmore West) and King Curtis as a member of Curtis's band The King Pins (Dupree grew up with Curtis in Fort Worth). He appeared on the 1969 Lena Horne and Gábor Szabó recording Lena & Gabor and on recordings with Archie Shepp, Grover Washington Jr., Snooky Young, and Miles Davis.

Dupree played guitar on Brook Benton's 1970 hit "Rainy Night in Georgia" in 1969. In December 1972, the British music magazine New Musical Express reported that Dupree, Roberta Flack, and Jerry Jemmott were injured in an auto accident in Manhattan. Dupree appeared on Joe Cocker's albums Stingray and Luxury You Can Afford. He also released solo albums such as Teasin' (1974), Cornell Dupree's Saturday Night Fever (1977), Shadow Dancing (1978), Coast to Coast (1988), Can't Get Through (1991), Child's Play (1993), Bop 'n' Blues (1995), and Uncle Funky (1998).

In the late 1970s, Dupree formed the new jazz fusion group Stuff with Eric Gale, Richard Tee, Steve Gadd, Chris Parker, and Gordon Edwards. Dupree and Tee recorded together on many occasions.

In 1989, Cornell recorded a video for guitar teacher Arlen Roth called Mastering R&B Guitar, which documented his style, technique, and influences.

In 2002, Yamaha produced a signature guitar called the Cornell Dupree Model. Dupree appeared in the 2009 documentary entitled Still Bill, about the life of soul legend Bill Withers. He appeared in the film on stage playing a guitar-led version of Withers' single "Grandma's Hands"; Withers, at first sitting in the audience, ultimately joins Dupree on stage to sing the song. The scene also shows Dupree playing guitar on a stool while breathing with an oxygen tank, foreshadowing his battles with emphysema.

Dupree died on May 8, 2011 at his home in Fort Worth, Texas, where his wife Erma, daughter Celestine, and granddaughter Bernice (named after his mother) were by his side. He had been waiting for a lung transplant as a result of emphysema.

== Discography ==
=== As leader ===
- Teasin' (Atlantic, 1974)
- Cornell Dupree's Saturday Night Fever (Versatile, 1977)
- Shadow Dancing (Versatile, 1978)
- Coast to Coast (Antilles, 1988)
- Can't Get Through (Amazing, 1991)
- Child's Play (Amazing, 1993)
- Guitar Riffs for DJs Vol. 1 (Tuff City, 1993)
- Guitar Riffs for DJs Vol. 2 (Tuff City, 1993)
- Bop 'n' Blues (Kokopelli, 1995)
- Uncle Funky (Kokopelli, 1998)
- Double Clutch (TKO Magnum Music, 1998)
- I'm Alright (Dialtone, 2011)
- Doin' Alright (P-Vine, 2011)

With Gadd Gang

- The Gadd Gang (Columbia, 1986)
- Here & Now (Columbia, 1988)
- Live at the Bottom Line (A Touch, 1994)

With Rainbow

- Crystal Green (East Wind, 1978)
- Over Crystal Green (Eighty-Eights, 2002)
- Harmony (Eighty-Eights, 2003)

With Stuff

- Stuff (Warner Bros., 1976)
- More Stuff (Warner Bros., 1977)
- Live Stuff (Warner Bros., 1978)
- Stuff It (Warner Bros., 1979)
- Live in New York (Warner Bros., 1980)
- Made in America (Bridge Gate, 1994)
- Now (Skip, 2001)
- Live at Montreux 1976 (Eagle, 2008)

=== As sideman ===
With Joe Cocker

- I Can Stand a Little Rain (A&M, 1974)
- Jamaica Say You Will (A&M, 1975)
- Stingray (A&M, 1976)
- Luxury You Can Afford (Asylum, 1978)

With Hank Crawford

- It's a Funky Thing to Do (Cotillion, 1971)
- Help Me Make it Through the Night (Kudu, 1972)
- We Got a Good Thing Going (Kudu, 1972)
- Crunch Time (Milestone, 1999)

With Aretha Franklin

- Spirit in the Dark (Atlantic, 1970)
- Young, Gifted and Black (Atlantic, 1972)
- Amazing Grace (Atlantic, 1972)
- Let Me in Your Life (Atlantic, 1974)
- With Everything I Feel in Me (Atlantic, 1974)
- La Diva (Atlantic, 1979)
- Aretha (Arista, 1980)

With Donny Hathaway

- Donny Hathaway (Atco, 1971)
- Extension of a Man (Atco, 1973)

With The Joneses

- Keepin' Up with the Joneses (Mercury, 1974)
- Our Love Song (P-Vine, 1992)
- Come Back to Me (P-Vine, 1993)

With Margie Joseph

- Margie Joseph (Atlantic, 1973)
- Sweet Surrender (Atlantic, 1974)
- Margie (Atlantic, 1975)

With King Curtis

- Live at Small's Paradise (Atco, 1966)
- Get Ready (Atco, 1970)
- Live at Fillmore West (Atco, 1971)
- Everybody's Talkin' (Atco, 1972)
- Blues at Montreux (Atlantic, 1973)

With Roland Kirk

- Blacknuss (Atlantic, 1972)
- The Case of the 3 Sided Dream in Audio Color (Atlantic, 1975)
- Kirkatron (Warner Bros., 1977)

With Van McCoy

- And His Magnificent Movie Machine (H&L, 1977)
- My Favorite (MCA, 1978)
- Lonely Dancer (MCA, 1979)

With Geoff Muldaur

- Is Having a Wonderful Time (Reprise, 1975)

With David "Fathead" Newman

- Lonely Avenue (Atlantic, 1972)
- The Weapon (Atlantic, 1973)
- Scratch My Back (Prestige, 1979)
- Return to the Wide Open Spaces (Amazing, 1990)

With Esther Phillips

- Burnin' (Atlantic, 1970)
- From a Whisper to a Scream (Kudu, 1971)
- Alone Again Naturally (Kudu, 1972)

With Wilson Pickett

- In the Midnight Hour (Atlantic, 1965)

With Lou Rawls

- Shades of Blue (Philadelphia International, 1980)
- At Last (Blue Note, 1989)
- It's Supposed to Be Fun (Blue Note, 1990)
- Portrait of the Blues (Manhattan, 1993)

With Rosie

- Last Dance (RCA Victor, 1977)

With Archie Shepp

- Attica Blues (Impulse, 1972)
- The Cry of My People (Impulse, 1973)
- The Impulse Story (Impulse!, 2006)

With Stanley Turrentine

- Cherry (CTI, 1972)
- The Man with the Sad Face (Fantasy, 1976)
- Nightwings (Fantasy, 1977)
- West Side Highway (Fantasy, 1978)

With Zulema

- Zulema (Sussex, 1972)
- R.S.V.P. (RCA Victor, 1975)
- Z-licious (London, 1978)

With others

- Ashford & Simpson, I Wanna Be Selfish (Warner Bros., 1974)
- Average White Band, Warmer Communications (Atlantic, 1978)
- Burt Bacharach, Blue Note Plays Burt Bacharach (Blue Note, 2004)
- Bama, Ghettos of the Mind (Chess, 1972)
- Joe Bataan, Singin' Some Soul (Fania, 1969)
- Joe Bataan, Afrofilipino (Salsoul, 1975)
- Harold Battiste & Melvin Lastie, Hal-Mel Alone Together (Opus 43, 1976)
- Maggie Bell, Queen of the Night (Atlantic, 1974)
- Brook Benton, Brook Benton Today (Cotillion, 1970)
- Brook Benton, The Gospel Truth (Cotillion, 1971)
- Brook Benton, Story Teller (Cotillion, 1971)
- Jay Berliner, Bananas Are Not Created Equal (Mainstream, 1972)
- Carla Bley, Dinner Music (WATT Works, 1977)
- Teresa Brewer, Singin' A Doo-Dah Song (Flying Dutchman, 1972)
- James Brown, Reality (Atlantic, 1974)
- Oscar Brown, Movin' On (Atlantic, 1972)
- Mariah Carey, Emotions (Columbia, 1991)
- Alice Clark, Alice Clark (Mainstream, 2019)
- Billy Cobham, Total Eclipse (Atlantic, 1974)
- The Crusaders, Ghetto Blaster (MCA, 1984)
- Miles Davis, Get Up with It (Columbia, 1974)
- Rainy Davis, Ouch (Columbia, 1988)
- Jackie DeShannon, Your Baby Is a Lady (Atlantic, 1974)
- Lou Donaldson, Sweet Lou (Blue Note, 1974)
- Charles Earland, The Dynamite Brothers (Prestige, 1974)
- Pee Wee Ellis, Home in the Country (Savoy, 1977)
- Faith Hope and Charity, Faith Hope & Charity (20th Century Fox, 1978)
- Michael Franks, The Camera Never Lies (Warner Bros., 1987)
- Jun Fukamachi, Evening Star (Kitty, 1978)
- Hiroshi Fukumura, Hunt Up Wind (Flying Disk, 1978)
- Dizzy Gillespie, Sweet Soul (Gateway, 1977)
- Grant Green, Blue Breakbeats (Blue Note, 1998)
- Grant Green, The Final Comedown (Blue Note, 2003)
- Eddie Harris, Come on Down (Atlantic, 1970)
- Eddie Harris, Second Movement (Atlantic, 1971)
- Gene Harris, Gene Harris of the Three Sounds (Blue Note, 1972)
- Loleatta Holloway, Queen of the Night (Gold Mind, 1978)
- Richard Groove Holmes, I'm in the Mood for Love (Flying Dutchman, 1976)
- Takehiro Honda, It's Great Outside (Flying Disk, 1978)
- Lena Horne & Gabor Szabo, Lena & Gabor (Skye, 1970)
- Lena Horne & Michel Legrand, Lena & Michel (RCA Victor, 1975)
- Cissy Houston, Cissy Houston (Private Stock, 1977)
- Ian Hunter, All American Alien Boy (Columbia, 1976)
- Weldon Irvine, Cosmic Vortex (RCA Victor, 1974)
- Weldon Irvine, Sinbad (RCA Victor, 1976)
- Etta James, Deep in the Night (Warner Bros., 1978)
- Jobriath, Creatures of the Street (Elektra, 1974)
- Elvin Jones, At This Point in Time (Blue Note, 1998)
- Elvin Jones, The Prime Element (Blue Note, 1976)
- Salena Jones, My Love (JVC, 1981)
- Kimiko Kasai, This Is My Love (CBS, 1975)
- Robin Kenyatta, Take the Heat Off Me (Jazz Dance, 1979)
- Chaka Khan, Chaka (Warner Bros., 1978)
- B. B. King, Guess Who (ABC, 1972)
- Freddie King, My Feeling for the Blues (Atlantic, 1970)
- Gladys Knight & the Pips, Still Together (Buddah, 1977)
- Gladys Knight & the Pips, The One and Only (Buddah, 1978)
- Yusef Lateef, Hush 'N' Thunder (Atlantic, 1973)
- Webster Lewis, On the Town (Epic, 1976)
- Lulu, New Routes (Atco, 1970)
- Cheryl Lynn, In Love (Columbia, 1979)
- Herbie Mann, Push Push (Embryo, 1971)
- Herbie Mann, Deep Pocket (Kokopelli, 1992)
- Arif Mardin, Journey (Atlantic, 1974)
- John Mayall, Bottom Line (DJM, 1979)
- Les McCann, Invitation to Openness (Atlantic, 1972)
- Delbert McClinton, Never Been Rocked Enough (Curb, 1992)
- Carmen McRae, I'm Coming Home Again (Buddah, 1980)
- Jack McDuff, A Change Is Gonna Come (Atlantic, 1966)
- Jack McDuff, Magnetic Feel (Cadet, 1975)
- Jimmy McGriff, The Dudes Doin' Business (Capitol, 1970)
- Bette Midler, Bette Midler (Atlantic, 1973)
- Garnet Mimms, Has It All (Arista, 1978)
- Blue Mitchell, Booty (Mainstream, 1974)
- Jackie Moore, Sweet Charlie Babe (Atlantic, 1973)
- Geoff Muldaur, Is Having a Wonderful Time (Reprise, 1975)
- John Kaizan Neptune, West of Somewhere (Milestone, 1981)
- Laura Nyro, Christmas and the Beads of Sweat (Columbia, 1970)
- Odyssey, Odyssey (RCA Victor, 1977)
- Robert Palmer, Sneakin' Sally Through the Alley (Island, 1975)
- Eddie Palmieri, Harlem River Drive (Roulette, 1971)
- Errol Parker, My Own Bag No. 1 (Sahara, 1972)
- Johnny Pate, Outrageous (MGM, 1970)
- The Persuaders, It's All About Love (Calla, 1976)
- Seldon Powell, Messin' With (Encounter 1973)
- Bernard Purdie, Stand By Me (Whatcha See Is Whatcha Get) (Mega, 1971)
- Bernard Purdie, Soul Is... Pretty Purdie (Flying Dutchman, 1972)
- Chuck Rainey, The Chuck Rainey Coalition (Skye, 1972)
- Louie Ramirez, A Different Shade of Black (Cotique, 1976)
- Vivian Reed, Another Side (Liberty, 1978)
- Buddy Rich, Big Band Machine (Groove Merchant, 1975)
- Buddy Rich, Ease On Down the Road (Denon, 1987)
- Larry Ridley, Sum of the Parts (Strata-East, 1975)
- Lightnin' Rod, Hustlers Convention (Celluloid, 1973)
- David Ruffin, In My Stride (Motown, 1977)
- David Sanborn, Upfront (Elektra, 1992)
- Harvey Scales, Confidential Affair (Casablanca, 1978)
- Warren Schatz, Warren Schatz (Columbia, 1971)
- Marlena Shaw, Marlena (Blue Note, 1972)
- Marlena Shaw, From the Depths of My Soul (Blue Note, 1973)
- Janis Siegel, At Home (Atlantic, 1987)
- Carly Simon, Boys in the Trees (Elektra, 1978)
- Paul Simon, There Goes Rhymin' Simon (Columbia, 1973)
- The Spinners, Love Trippin' (Atlantic, 1980)
- Ringo Starr, Ringo the 4th (Atlantic, 1977)
- Candi Staton, Chance (Warner Bros., 1979)
- Dakota Staton, Madame Foo-Foo (Groove Merchant, 1972)
- Sonny Stitt, Mr. Bojangles (Cadet, 1973)
- Barbra Streisand, Guilty (Columbia, 1980)
- Howard Tate, Get It While You Can (Verve, 1967)
- Howard Tate, Howard Tate (Atlantic, 1972)
- Kate Taylor, Kate Taylor (Columbia, 1978)
- Leon Thomas, Blues and the Soulful Truth (Flying Dutchman, 1972)
- Rufus Thomas, Did You Heard Me? (Stax, 1972)
- Rufus Thomas, Crown Prince of Dance (Stax, 1973)
- Tasha Thomas, Midnight Rendezvous (SoulMusic, 2015)
- Big Mama Thornton, Sassy Mama! (Vanguard, 1975)
- The Tymes, Tymes Up (RCA Victor, 1976)
- Kenny Vance, Vance 32 (Atlantic, 1975)
- Eddie "Cleanhead" Vinson, You Can't Make Love Alone (Mega, 1971)
- Voices of East Harlem, Right On Be Free (Elektra, 1970)
- Cedar Walton, Beyond Mobius (RCA Victor, 1976)
- Grover Washington Jr., All the King's Horses (Kudu, 1972)
- Charles Williams, Trees and Grass and Things (Mainstream, 1971)
- Charles Williams, Stickball (Mainstream, 1972)
- Jerry Lynn Williams, Jerry Williams (Spindizzy, 1972)
- Jimmy Witherspoon, Spoonful (Blue Note, 1975)
- Peter Wolf, Fool's Parade (Mercury, 1998)
- Peter Wolf, Sleepless (Artemis, 2002)
- Philippe Wynne, Starting All Over (Cotillion, 1977)
- Camille Yarbrough, The Iron Pot Cooker (Vanguard, 1975)
