= Chris Parker (musician) =

American jazz drummer (born 1950)

- Born: Christopher Parker; 1950 (age 75–76); Chicago, Illinois, U.S.
- Genres: Jazz fusion; smooth jazz; crossover jazz; jazz
- Occupation: Musician
- Instrument: Drums
- Years active: 1970s–present

Christopher Parker (born 1950) is an American jazz/jazz fusion drummer.

== Biography ==
=== Early life ===
Born in Chicago and raised in New York City, Parker is the oldest of five sons born to Dorothy Daniels and artist Robert Andrew Parker, all but one of whom went on to play drums professionally.

During his childhood, his father, himself an amateur jazz drummer, attached wooden blocks to the hi-hat and bass drum pedals, so that Parker's feet could reach the pedals to play the drums along with records. His father introduced him to the music of Thelonious Monk, Miles Davis, Leadbelly, Ray Charles, Woody Herman, Count Basie, Lionel Hampton, Bix Beiderbecke, Louis Armstrong and Duke Ellington. As a teenager, however, Parker began seeing the appeal of rock and roll and R&B, as he practiced with friends and listened to drummers like Roger Hawkins, D. J. Fontana and Al Jackson, Jr., as well as New Orleans icons such as Earl Palmer, Smokey Johnson and James Black.

Simultaneously pursuing his interest in art, Parker attended the Skowhegan School of Painting and Sculpture and subsequently received a scholarship to New York City's School of Visual Arts. It was while there that Parker's decisive pivot to music occurred, in the form of a "Drummer wanted" ad in Rolling Stone Magazine, which, in turn, led him to Woodstock, New York, where he joined a band called Holy Moses. Although the band survived scarcely long enough to record one album, Parker opted to remain in Woodstock, working at local venues with music icons such as Paul Butterfield's Better Days, Bonnie Raitt, Tim Hardin, Rick Danko, Mike Bloomfield and Merl Saunders.

=== Musical career ===
Four years later he played in a band called Encyclopedia of Soul, which later on became known as Stuff, with bassist Gordon Edwards, guitarists Cornell Dupree and Eric Gale, and keyboardist Richard Tee. Later on, in the same band, he shared his drum with another rising star, Steve Gadd. It was during this period that Parker co-founded the Brecker Brothers, led by Michael and Randy Brecker and featuring Buzzy Feiten, David Sanborn, Don Grolnick, Steve Khan, and Will Lee. Parker toured and recorded three albums with the group, and over the years has performed and recorded with artists such as James Brown, Miles Davis, Aretha Franklin, Ashford & Simpson, Patti Austin, Cher, Michael Bolton, Quincy Jones, Freddie Hubbard and Salt n' Pepa.

In 1986, Parker was invited to be a part of Saturday Night Live and served there six years. In 1988, he became a member of Bob Dylan's touring band, which included G.E. Smith, later SNL's music director. Parker played on Donald Fagen's Kamakiriad album, which was nominated for (but did not win) the 1993 Grammy Award for Album of the Year.

== Discography ==
With Joe Beck

- Beck (Kudu, 1975)

With Stephen Bishop

- Red Cab to Manhattan (Warner Bros. Records, 1980)

With Cornell Dupree

- Shadow Dancing (Versatile, 1978)

With Bonnie Raitt

- Give It Up (Warner Bros. Records, 1972)

With Sinéad O'Connor

- Am I Not Your Girl? (Chrysalis Records, 1992)

With Cher

- Cher (Geffen, 1987)

With Candi Staton

- Chance (Warner Bros. Records, 1979)

With Aretha Franklin

- La Diva (Atlantic Records, 1979)

With Melanie

- Phonogenic – Not Just Another Pretty Face (Midsong International, 1978)

With Jackie Lomax

- Livin' For Lovin' (Capitol Records, 1976)

With Don McLean

- Don McLean (United Artists Records, 1972)

With Barry Manilow

- Barry Manilow II (Arista Records, 1974)

With Maria Muldaur

- Maria Muldaur (Reprise Records, 1973)

With Michael Bolton

- The Hunger (Columbia Records, 1987)
- Soul Provider (Columbia Records, 1989)

With Bruce Cockburn

- Dart to the Heart (True North Records, 1994)

With Robert Palmer

- Double Fun (Island Records, 1978)

With Judy Collins

- Home Again (Elektra Records, 1984)

With Melba Moore

- Melba '76 (Buddah Records, 1976)

With Natalie Cole

- Stardust (Elektra Records, 1996)

With Phoebe Snow

- Never Letting Go (Sony, 1977)

With Loudon Wainwright III

- History (Charisma Records, 1992)

With Chaka Khan

- CK (Warner Bros. Records, 1988)

With Irene Cara

- Anyone Can See (Network Records, 1982)

With Teddy Pendergrass

- TP (Philadelphia International, 1980)

With Art Garfunkel

- Songs from a Parent to a Child (Columbia Records, 1997)

With Elvis Costello

- Painted from Memory (Mercury Records, 1998)

With Donald Fagen

- Kamakiriad (Reprise Records, 1993)

With Michael Franks

- Passionfruit (Warner Bros. Records, 1983)
- Skin Dive (Warner Bros. Records, 1985)
- The Camera Never Lies (Warner Bros. Records, 1987)
- Abandoned Garden (Warner Bros. Records, 1995)

With Patricia Kaas

- Dans ma chair (Columbia Records, 1997)

With Laura Nyro

- Smile (Columbia Records, 1976)

With Mark Murphy

- What a Way to Go (Muse Records, 1990)

With Taeko Ohnuki

- Sunshower (PANAM, 1977)

With Eumir Deodato

- Very Together (1976)
