= Richard Tee =

American pianist, singer and arranger (1943–1993)

- Tee in 1990

Background information
- Born: Richard Edward Ten Ryk; November 24, 1943; New York City, U.S.
- Died: July 21, 1993 (aged 49) New York City, U.S.
- Genres: Jazz fusion; jazz; smooth jazz; crossover jazz
- Occupations: Musician; singer-songwriter
- Instruments: Keyboards; vocals
- Years active: 1967–1993
- Label: Warner Bros.
- Formerly of: Stuff

Richard Edward Tee (born Richard Edward Ten Ryk; November 24, 1943 – July 21, 1993) was an American jazz fusion pianist, studio musician, singer and arranger. Tee had several hundred studio credits and played on such hits as "I'll Be Sweeter Tomorrow (Than I Was Today)" (1967), "Until You Come Back To Me" (1974), "The Hustle" (1975), "Slip Slidin' Away" (1977), "Just the Two of Us" (1981), "Tell Her About It" (1983), and "In Your Eyes" (1986).

== Biography ==
Tee was born in Brooklyn, New York to Edward James Ten Ryk (1886–1963), who was from Guyana, and Helen G. Ford Skeete Ten Ryk (1902–2000), of New York. He spent most of his life in Brooklyn and lived with his mother in a brownstone apartment building.

He graduated from The High School of Music & Art in New York City and attended the Manhattan School of Music. Though better known as a studio and session musician, Tee led a jazz ensemble, the Richard Tee Committee, and was a founding member of the band Stuff. In 1981, he played the piano and Fender Rhodes for Simon and Garfunkel's Concert in Central Park.

== Career ==
Tee played with a diverse range of artists during his career, including Paul Simon, Carly Simon, The Bee Gees, Barbra Streisand, Roberta Flack, Aretha Franklin, Diane Schuur, Donny Hathaway, Peter Allen, George Harrison, Diana Ross, Duane Allman, Quincy Jones, Bill Withers, Art Garfunkel, Nina Simone, Juice Newton, Billy Joel, Etta James, Grover Washington Jr., Eric Clapton, Kenny Loggins, Patti Austin, David Ruffin, Lou Rawls, Ron Carter, Peter Gabriel, George Benson, Joe Cocker, Chuck Mangione, Peabo Bryson, Mariah Carey, Chaka Khan, Phoebe Snow, Leo Sayer, Herbie Mann, Pino Daniele, Tim Finn, and countless others. He also contributed to numerous gold and platinum albums during his long career and joined Stuff led by bassist Gordon Edwards. Other members of the band included guitarist Cornell Dupree, drummer Chris Parker, and later guitarist Eric Gale and drummer Steve Gadd.

Richard Tee arranged the Timothy Wilson song "Baby Baby Please" which was composed by the Poindexter Brothers and produced by George Kerr. Released in 1967, it became an R&B hit, getting to no 46 on the Billboard Top Selling R&B Singles chart.

Tee was the arranger on the O'Jays 1968 single "I'll Be Sweeter Tomorrow" bw "I Dig Your Act", which was released on Bell 691.

Along with Hugh McCracken, Eric Gale, and Steve Gadd, Tee played on Van McCoy's 1976 album, The Real McCoy. The album received a good review with the picks being "Love at First Sight", "Night Walk", "Theme from Star Trek", and "African Symphony".

In 1980, Tee played keyboards on Paul Simon's album "One Trick Pony" and also starred, along with Paul Simon, Steve Gadd, Eric Gale and Tony Levin in the movie of the same name.

In June 1980, the band Stuff, made up of Tee, Gordon Edwards, Cornell Dupree, Eric Gale, and Steve Gadd, performed at the Berkeley Jazz Festival which was held over a four day period. On the week ending July 12, 1980, Tee's album Natural Ingredients entered the Cash Box Jazz Top 40 Albums chart at no. 31. At week three on July 26, it got to no. 20. It held that position for another week. It spent a total of nine weeks in the chart.

== Personal life ==
After a 16-year relationship with Eleana Steinberg Tee of Greenwich, Connecticut, the couple were married in Woodstock, New York, by New York State Supreme Court Justice Bruce Wright. The couple moved to the Chelsea Hotel in 1988, and later to Cold Spring, New York.

== Illness and death ==
In 1993, Tee had begun extensive treatment for his prostate cancer following his diagnosis during his time with Paul Simon's Rhythm of the Saints tour. A special tribute event was set up for him and was to take place June 6, 1993 at Club Tatou in Beverly Hills. Those set to attend included Stevie Wonder, Herbie Hancock, and Chevy Chase. Proceeds from the event were to go to Humantics Foundation for Richard Tee.

Tee died on July 21, 1993, in Calvary Hospital age 49. He is buried in the Artist's Cemetery in Woodstock, New York. Tee's grave is marked by the outline of a grand piano (as viewed from above) made from stainless steel, with a black granite plaque in a keyboard design on top. Tee's nickname of "Stuffy" is engraved on the memorial plaque, together with his name and dates.

== Equipment ==
Tee used a diverse range of keyboards during his recording and touring career, notably the Hammond organ, piano, Hohner clavinet and synthesizers. His trademark sound, however, was achieved by playing a Fender Rhodes electric piano through an Electro-Harmonix Small Stone phase shifter effect pedal.

== Discography ==
=== As leader ===
- Strokin' (Tappan Zee/Columbia, 1979)
- Natural Ingredients (Tappan Zee, 1980)
- The Bottom Line (Electric Bird, 1985)
- Inside You (Epic/Sony, 1989)
- Real Time (One Voice, 1992)
- The Right Stuff (P-Vine, 1993)
- Real Time Live in Concert 1992 (Videoarts, 2012)

=== As guest ===
With George Benson

- Tell It Like It Is (1969)
- Give Me the Night (1980)
- In Your Eyes (1983)
- Big Boss Band (1990) with the Count Basie Orchestra
- Love Remembers (1993)

With Hank Crawford

- It's a Funky Thing to Do (Cotillion, 1971)
- Help Me Make it Through the Night (Kudu, 1972)
- We Got a Good Thing Going (Kudu, 1972)
- Wildflower (Kudu, 1973)
- Hank Crawford's Back (Kudu, 1976)

With Cornell Dupree

- Teasin' (1974)
- Coast to Coast (1988)
- Can't Get Through (1991)
- Child's Play (1992)
- Uncle Funky (1992)

With Steve Gadd

- Gadd About (1984)
- The Gadd Gang (1986)
- Here & Now (1988)
- Live at the Bottom Line (1988)
- Gadd Gang (1991)

With Stuff

- Stuff (1976)
- More Stuff (1977)
- Stuff It (1978)
- Live Stuff (1978)
- Live in New York (1980)
- East (1981)
- Best Stuff (1981)
- Stuff Live in Montreux (2008)

With Grover Washington Jr.

- Inner City Blues (1971)
- All the King's Horses (1972)
- Soul Box – Vol. 1 & Vol. 2 (1973)
- Feels So Good (1975)
- Winelight (1980)
- Skylarkin' (1980)
- Come Morning (1981)
- The Best Is Yet to Come (1982)
- In Concert (1982)
- Inside Moves (1984)
- A House Full of Love (1986)

With others

- Tune In, Turn On (1967) Benny Golson
- Soul Drums (1968) Bernard Purdie
- Soul Rebel (1968) Bob Marley
- I Heard That (1969) Quincy Jones
- Shirley Scott & the Soul Saxes (1969) Shirley Scott
- Lena & Gabor (1969) Lena Horne and Gábor Szabó
- Good Vibes (1969) Gary Burton
- Cornucopia (1969) Dizzy Gillespie
- Comment (1970) Les McCann
- Live at Freddie Jett's Pied Piper (1970) Esther Phillips
- Everybody's Talkin' (1970) King Curtis
- Suite 16 (1970) Yusef Lateef
- Boys from Dayton (1971) Snooky Young
- Blacknuss (1971) Rahsaan Roland Kirk
- Salt Song (1971) Stanley Turrentine
- Quiet Fire (1971) Roberta Flack
- Push Push (1971) Herbie Mann
- Young, Gifted and Black (1972) Aretha Franklin
- Chuck Rainey Coalition (1972) Chuck Rainey
- Sweet Buns & Barbeque (1972) Houston Person
- Soul Is... Pretty Purdie (1972) Bernard Purdie
- Alone Again (Naturally) (1972) Esther Phillips
- The Final Comedown (1972) Grant Green
- Sweet Buns & Barbeque (1972) Houston Person
- The Weapon (1973) David Newman
- Blues Farm (1973) Ron Carter
- Don't Mess with Mister T. (1973) Stanley Turrentine
- Abandoned Luncheonette (1973) Daryl Hall & John Oates
- In the Beginning (1974) Hubert Laws
- I Can Stand a Little Rain (1974) Joe Cocker
- Let Me in Your Life (1974) Aretha Franklin
- Your Baby Is a Lady (1974) Jackie DeShannon
- With Everything I Feel in Me (1974) Aretha Franklin
- Continental American (1974) Peter Allen
- AWB (1974) Average White Band
- Journey (1974) Arif Mardin
- The Disco Kid (1975) Van McCoy
- Anything Goes (1975) Ron Carter
- Feel Like Makin' Love (1975) Roberta Flack
- Negril (1975) Eric Gale
- Still Crazy After All These Years (1975) Paul Simon
- Sneakin' Sally Through the Alley (1975) Robert Palmer
- Jamaica Say You Will (1975) Joe Cocker
- The New York Connection (1975) Tom Scott
- Lost Generation (1975) Elliott Murphy
- Thirty Three & 1/3 (1976) George Harrison
- The Case of the 3 Sided Dream in Audio Color (1976) Rahsaan Roland Kirk
- Second Childhood (1976) Phoebe Snow
- Dinner Music (1976) Carla Bley
- Stingray (1976) Joe Cocker
- End of a Rainbow (1976) Patti Austin
- The Real McCoy (1976) Van McCoy
- Endless Flight (1976) Leo Sayer
- Native New Yorker (1977) Odyssey
- Firefly (1977) Jeremy Steig
- Roots (1977) Quincy Jones
- Havana Candy (1977) Patti Austin
- Cissy Houston (1977) Cissy Houston
- Never Letting Go (1977) Phoebe Snow
- Watermark (1977) Art Garfunkel
- Lady Put the Light Out (1977) Frankie Valli
- Celebrate Me Home (1977) Kenny Loggins
- The Stranger (1977) Billy Joel
- Ringo the 4th (1977) Ringo Starr
- The Atlantic Family Live in Montreaux (1977)
- Multiplication (1978) Eric Gale
- Phonogenic – Not Just Another Pretty Face (1978) Melanie
- It Begins Again (1978) Dusty Springfield
- Don't Cry Out Loud (1978) Melissa Manchester
- Luxury You Can Afford (1978) Joe Cocker
- Boys in the Trees (1978) Carly Simon
- Deep in the Night (1978) Etta James
- Intimate Strangers (1978) Tom Scott
- Cheryl Lynn (1978) Cheryl Lynn
- Queen of the Night (1978) Loleatta Holloway
- Against the Grain (1978) Phoebe Snow
- Chaka (1978) Chaka Khan
- Warmer Communications (1978) Average White Band
- Scratch My Back (1979) David "Fathead" Newman
- Prisoner (1979) Cher
- Spy (1979) Carly Simon
- In Love (1979) Cheryl Lynn
- La Diva (1979) Aretha Franklin
- I Could Have Been a Sailor (1979) Peter Allen
- Fate for Breakfast (1979) Art Garfunkel
- Syreeta (1980) Syreeta Wright
- Connections (1980) Richie Havens
- Aretha (1980) Aretha Franklin
- One-Trick Pony (1980) Paul Simon
- Guilty (1980) Barbra Streisand
- Love Sensation (1980) Loleatta Holloway
- What Cha' Gonna Do for Me (1981) Chaka Khan
- Apple Juice (1981) Tom Scott
- RIT (1981) Lee Ritenour
- Living Eyes (1981) Bee Gees
- Blade Runner (1982)
- Heartbreaker (1982) Dionne Warwick
- I'm the One (1982) Roberta Flack
- Tantalizingly Hot (1982) Stephanie Mills
- Quiet Lies (1982) Juice Newton
- Fill Up The Night (1983) Sadao Watanabe
- Hearts and Bones (1983) Paul Simon
- Escapade (1983) Tim Finn
- In My Life (1983) Patti Austin
- An Innocent Man (1983) Billy Joel
- Born to Love (1983) Peabo Bryson, Roberta Flack
- Merciless (1983) Stephanie Mills
- Universal Rhythm (1984) Ralph MacDonald
- Watching You Watching Me (1985) Bill Withers
- Ferryboat(1985) Pino Daniele
- "Underground" David Bowie (1986)
- So (1986) Peter Gabriel
- 10th Avenue (1986) Patrick Williams New York Band on "Still Crazy After All These Years"
- Streamlines (1987) Tom Scott
- Get Close to My Love (1987) Jennifer Holliday
- Sound Investment (1987) Flip Phillips & Scott Hamilton
- Red Hot Rhythm & Blues (1987) Diana Ross
- At Home (1987) Janis Siegel
- The Camera Never Lies (1987) Michael Franks
- Close Up (1988) David Sanborn
- Talkin' 'Bout You (1988) Diane Schuur
- The Real Me (1988) Patti Austin
- Hot Water (1988) Jimmy Buffett
- At Last (1989) Lou Rawls
- Street Smarts (1989) Eddie Gomez
- Journeyman (1989) Eric Clapton
- Soul Provider (1989) Michael Bolton
- Midnight in San Juan (1989) Earl Klugh
- Bottom's Up (1989) Victor Bailey
- Mariah Carey (1990) Mariah Carey
- Leap of Faith (1991) Kenny Loggins
- Star Time (1991) James Brown
- Upfront (1992) David Sanborn
- Am I Not Your Girl? (1992) Sinéad O'Connor
- I'll Take Care of You (1992) Cissy Houston, Chuck Jackson
- Evolution of Herbie Mann (1993) Herbie Mann
- Black Tie White Noise (1993) David Bowie
- Friends Can Be Lovers (1993) Dionne Warwick
- Don't Look Back (1993) Al Green
- Skyline (1993) Phil Carmen
