= Eric Gale =

American jazz guitarist (1938–1994)

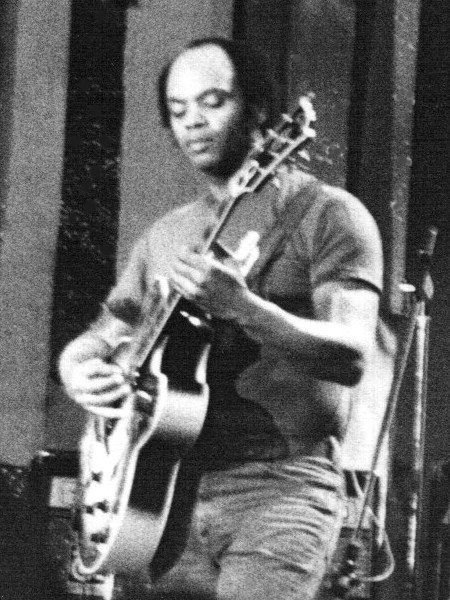
- Gale in Montreux, Switzerland, 1976

Background information
- Born: September 20, 1938; Bedford-Stuyvesant, Brooklyn, New York
- Died: May 25, 1994 (aged 55) Baja California, Mexico
- Genres: Jazz, smooth jazz, crossover jazz, jazz fusion
- Occupation: Musician
- Instrument: Guitar
- Years active: 1960s–1990s
- Labels: CTI, Kudu, Columbia, Elektra/Musician, Klik
- Formerly of: Stuff, Fania All-Stars

Eric Gale (September 20, 1938 – May 25, 1994) was an American jazz and jazz fusion guitarist.

== Biography ==
Eric Gale was born in Bedford–Stuyvesant, Brooklyn, New York to an American mother and British father. His grandfather was English so he spent his holidays visiting family in the UK, which allowed him to look at the world through a different perspective. He was fluent in German and Spanish. Gale started playing the guitar at age 12.

He attended private, all-boys Catholic schools and was exceptionally skilled at math. He skipped junior high school and, while in high school, frequently visited John Coltrane's home where he sat in on jam sessions, and was given after-school snacks by John Coltrane's wife, which he appreciated. Gale received his Masters in chemistry at Niagara University. While a professor at Penn State University he made the momentous decision to pursue a musical career instead of a Ph.D. in Chemistry, which displeased his mother. In the late 1960's, Van Morrison recorded "Brown Eyed Girl", which was originally titled "Brown Skinned Girl". You can hear Eric's catchy riff in the session, but the radio stations requested the title be changed to "Brown Eyed Girl", as the original was considered too controversial for the times. Soon after, Frank Sinatra approached Eric to work on the hit song "My Way," as mentioned in Sinatra's autobiography. He also appears on Roberta Flack & Donny Hathaway's "Where Is the Love" (1972), and has worked with Phil Upchurch and George Benson, to name a few.

Roberta Flack called Gale and begged him to come back home to New York to help her with her Killing Me Softly (1973) album. Gale was reluctant, so she flew the band members to him instead. After some persuading, they ended up returning to the United States. A close, intelligent friend of his, Flack worked together with Gale on her Killing Me Softly album. He had just finished recording his Negril album with Cedric Brooks, Richard Tee, the Wailers, along with Peter Tosh on vocals, in Kingston, Jamaica. He flew out to Montego Bay, Jamaica, to clear his mind and reconnect with nature, then was able to finish an album in Kingston with his friends who understood the inexplicable injustice of politics. This was mentioned in Aston "Familyman" Barrett's autobiography.

Gale often worked as a session musician, recording with musicians such as Bobby Lewis, King Curtis, Quincy Jones, Roberta Flack, Van McCoy, Jesse Belvin, Maxine Brown, Bobby Timmons, George Benson, Lena Horne, Joe Cocker, The Drifters, The Flamingos, Ashford & Simpson, Illinois Jacquet, Billy Joel, Herbie Mann, David "Fathead" Newman, Patti Austin, Mongo Santamaria, Paul Simon, Nina Simone, Jimmy Smith, Clark Terry, Fania All-Stars, and Jackie Wilson. In the 1970s he became a studio guitarist for CTI Records, recording with Bob James, Stanley Turrentine, and Grover Washington Jr., and was a member of the R&B band Stuff with Steve Gadd and others. His first of many albums as a solo act was released by Kudu. Gale played guitar on Van McCoy's hit "The Hustle"(1975) and Grover Washington Jr.'s "Just the Two of Us".

Gale died of lung cancer in 1994 at the age of 55.

== Discography ==
=== As leader ===
- Forecast (Kudu, 1973)
- Negril (Micron Music; Klik, 1975)
- Multiplication (Columbia, 1977)
- Ginseng Woman (Columbia, 1977)
- Part of You (Columbia, 1979)
- Touch of Silk (Columbia, 1980)
- Blue Horizon (Elektra/Musician, 1982)
- In the Shade of a Tree (JVC, 1982)
- Island Breeze (Elektra, 1983)
- In a Jazz Tradition (EmArcy, 1988)
- Let's Stay Together (Artful Balance, 1988)
- Utopia (Rooms, 1998, released posthumously)

With Stuff

- Stuff (Warner Bros., 1976)
- More Stuff (Warner Bros. 1977)
- Live Stuff (Warner Bros., 1978)
- Stuff It! (Warner Bros., 1979)
- Live in New York (Warner Bros., 1980)
- Made in America (Bridge Gate, 1994)

=== As sideman ===
With Ashford & Simpson

- Come as You Are (Warner Bros., 1976)
- Send It (Warner Bros., 1977)
- Is It Still Good to Ya (Warner Bros., 1978)
- Stay Free (Warner Bros., 1979)
- A Musical Affair (Warner Bros., 1980)
- Street Opera (Capitol, 1982)
- So So Satisfied (Big Break, 2015)

With Patti Austin

- End of a Rainbow (CTI, 1976)
- Havana Candy (CTI, 1977)
- Every Home Should Have One (Qwest, 1981)
- In My Life (CTI, 1983)

With George Benson

- Giblet Gravy (Verve, 1968)
- Good King Bad (CTI, 1976)
- Benson & Farrell (CTI, 1976)
- Space (CTI, 1978)
- Pacific Fire (CTI, 1983)

With Ron Carter

- Anything Goes (Kudu, 1975)
- Yellow & Green (CTI, 1976)
- Very Well (Polydor, 1987)
- I'm Walkin (EmArcy, 1988)

With Hank Crawford

- Mr. Blues Plays Lady Soul (Atlantic, 1969)
- It's a Funky Thing to Do (Cotillion, 1971)
- Help Me Make it Through the Night (Kudu, 1972)
- I Hear a Symphony (Kudu, 1975)
- Hank Crawford's Back (Kudu, 1976)
- Tico Rico (Kudu, 1977)

With Fania All-Stars

- Ella Fue/Juan Pachanga (Columbia, 1977)
- Ella Fue/Steady (Discophon, 1977)
- Rhythm Machine (Fania, 1977)
- Spanish Fever (Columbia, 1978)
- Cross Over (Columbia, 1979)
- Commitment (Fania, 1980)
- Social Change (Dig It, 1981)

With Roberta Flack

- Chapter Two (Atlantic, 1970)
- Roberta Flack & Donny Hathaway (Atlantic, 1972)
- Killing Me Softly (Atlantic, 1973)
- I'm the One (Atlantic, 1982)

With Jun Fukamachi

- The Sea of Dirac (Kitty, 1977)
- Evening Star (Kitty, 1978)
- On the Move (Alfa, 1978)

With Freddie Hubbard

- A Soul Experiment (Atlantic, 1969)
- First Light (CTI, 1973)
- In Concert (CTI, 1973)
- Windjammer (Columbia, 1976)

With Bob James

- Two (CTI, 1975)
- Three (CTI, 1976)
- BJ4 (CTI, 1977)
- Heads (Tappan Zee, 1977)
- Touchdown (Tappan Zee, 1978)
- Lucky Seven (Tappan Zee, 1979)
- One on One (Tappan Zee, 1979)
- Sign of the Times (Tappan Zee, 1981)
- The Genie (Tappan Zee, 1983)
- 12 (Tappan Zee, 1984)
- Double Vision (Warner Bros., 1986)
- Grand Piano Canyon (Warner Bros., 1990)

With Quincy Jones

- Walking in Space (A&M, 1969)
- Gula Matari (A&M, 1970)
- Smackwater Jack (A&M, 1971)
- $ (Reprise, 1972)
- Body Heat (A&M, 1974)
- I Heard That!! (A&M, 1976)
- Sounds...and Stuff Like That!! (A&M, 1978)

With Gladys Knight & the Pips

- Still Together (Buddah, 1977)
- The One and Only (Buddah, 1978)
- About Love (Columbia, 1980)
- Touch (Columbia, 1981)

With Yusef Lateef

- Yusef Lateef's Detroit (Atlantic, 1969)
- Suite 16 (Atlantic, 1970)
- The Gentle Giant (Atlantic, 1972)
- Autophysiopsychic (CTI, 1977)
- In a Temple Garden (CTI, 1979)

With Ralph MacDonald

- Sound of a Drum (Marlin, 1976)
- The Path (Marlin, 1978)
- Counterpoint (Marlin, 1979)
- Universal Rhythm (Polydor, 1984)
- Surprize (Polydor, 1985)

With Van McCoy

- Disco Baby (Avco, 1975)
- The Disco Kid (Avco, 1975)
- The Real McCoy (H&L, 1976)
- Rhythms of the World (H&L, 1976)

With David "Fathead" Newman

- Bigger & Better (Atlantic, 1968)
- Captain Buckles (Cotillion, 1971)
- Scratch My Back (Prestige, 1979)

With Esther Phillips

- Esther Phillips Sings (Atlantic, 1966)
- From a Whisper to a Scream (Kudu, 1971)
- Alone Again Naturally (Kudu, 1972)
- Capricorn Princess (Kudu, 1976)

With Diana Ross

- The Boss (Motown, 1979)
- Why Do Fools Fall in Love (RCA Victor, 1981)
- Silk Electric (Capitol, 1982)
- Ross (RCA, 1983)
- Red Hot Rhythm & Blues (EMI, 1987)

With David Ruffin

- Who I Am (Motown, 1975)
- Everything's Coming Up Love (Motown, 1976)
- In My Stride (Motown, 1977)

With Mongo Santamaria

- Mongo '70 (Atlantic, 1970)
- Mongo's Way (Atlantic, 1971)
- Red Hot (Tappan Zee, 1979)

With Shirley Scott

- Soul Song (Atlantic, 1969)
- Shirley Scott & the Soul Saxes (Atlantic, 1969)
- Something (Atlantic, 1970)

With Tom Scott

- New York Connection (Ode, 1975)
- Blow It Out (Ode, 1977)
- Intimate Strangers (Columbia, 1978)
- Apple Juice (Columbia, 1981)
- Streamlines (GRP, 1987)
- Flashpoint (GRP, 1988)
- Them Changes (GRP, 1990)
- Keep This Love Alive (GRP, 1991)
- Reed My Lips (GRP, 1994)

With Frank Sinatra

- The World We Knew (Reprise, 1967)

With Johnny "Hammond" Smith

- Breakout (Kudu, 1971)
- The Prophet (Kudu, 1972)
- Wild Horses Rock Steady (Kudu, 1972)

With Richard Tee

- Strokin (Tappan Zee, 1979)
- Natural Ingredients (Tappan Zee, 1980)
- Real Time (One Voice, 1995)

With Stanley Turrentine

- Salt Song (CTI, 1971)
- Don't Mess with Mister T. (CTI, 1973)
- The Baddest Turrentine (CTI, 1973)
- The Sugar Man (CTI, 1975)
- The Man with the Sad Face (Fantasy, 1976)
- Nightwings (Fantasy, 1977)
- West Side Highway (Fantasy, 1978)

With Grover Washington Jr.

- Inner City Blues (Kudu, 1971)
- All the King's Horses (Kudu, 1972)
- Soul Box (Kudu, 1973)
- Feels So Good (Kudu, 1975)
- Mister Magic (Kudu, 1975)
- A Secret Place (Kudu, 1976)
- Skylarkin' (Motown, 1980)
- Winelight (Elektra, 1980)
- Come Morning (Elektra, 1981)
- The Best Is Yet to Come (Elektra, 1982)
- Inside Moves (Elektra, 1984)

With Sadao Watanabe

- Morning Island (Flying Disk, 1979)
- Nice Shot! (Flying Disk, 1980)
- How's Everything (Columbia, 1980)
- Orange Express (CBS, 1981)
- Bravas Brothers (1983)
- Fill Up the Night (Elektra, 1983)
- Rendezvous (Elektra, 1984)
- Vocal Collection (Warner, 2009)

With others

- Mose Allison, Lessons in Living (Elektra Musician, 1983)
- Herb Alpert, My Abstract Heart (A&M, 1989)
- Eric Andersen, Avalanche (Warner Bros., 1968)
- The Appletree Theatre, Playback (Verve, 1968)
- Richard Barbary, Soul Machine (A&M, 1968)
- Gato Barbieri, Caliente! (A&M, 1976)
- Gato Barbieri, Passion and Fire (A&M, 1984)
- Carla Bley, Dinner Music (WATT, 1977)
- Blood, Sweat & Tears, More Than Ever (Columbia, 1976)
- Angela Bofill, Angie (GRP, 1978)
- Angela Bofill, Angel of the Night (GRP, 1979)
- Ruth Brown, Black Is Brown and Brown Is Beautiful (Skye, 1969)
- Solomon Burke, King Solomon (Atlantic, 1968)
- Solomon Burke, I Wish I Knew (Atlantic, 1968)
- Gary Burton, Good Vibes (Atlantic, 1970)
- Paul Butterfield, Put It in Your Ear (Bearsville, 1975)
- Oscar Castro-Neves, Tropical Heart (JVC, 1993)
- Ray Charles, A Message from the People (ABC, 1972)
- Stanley Clarke, Implosions (Jazzvisions, NEC Avenue, 1987)
- The Coasters, Young Blood (Atlantic, 1982)
- Joe Cocker, Stingray (A&M, 1976)
- Randy Crawford, Everything Must Change (Warner Bros., 1976)
- King Curtis, Old Gold (Tru-Sound, 1961)
- King Curtis, Get Ready (Atco, 1970)
- Fats Domino, Fats Is Back (Reprise, 1968)
- Charles Earland, Revelation (Mercury, 1977)
- Pee Wee Ellis, Home in the Country (Savoy, 1977)
- Art Farmer, Crawl Space (CTI, 1977)
- Joe Farrell, La Catedral y El Toro (Warner Bros., 1977)
- Maynard Ferguson, Primal Scream (Columbia, 1976)
- Maynard Ferguson, Conquistador (Columbia, 1977)
- Aretha Franklin, Young, Gifted and Black (Atlantic, 1972)
- Michael Franks, One Bad Habit (Warner Bros., 1980)
- Fuse One, Silk (CTI, 1981)
- Dizzy Gillespie, The Real Thing (Perception, 1970)
- Barry Goldberg, Street Man (Buddah, 1969)
- Benny Golson, Tune In, Turn On (Verve, 1967)
- Urbie Green, The Fox (CTI, 1977)
- Dave Grusin, Dave Grusin and the NY-LA Dream Band (GRP, 1982)
- Dave Grusin, The Orchestral Album (GRP, 1994)
- Chico Hamilton, The Head Hunters (Solid State, 1969)
- Herbie Hancock, Fat Albert Rotunda (Warner Bros., 1969)
- Rufus Harley, King/Queens (Atlantic, 1970)
- Greg Hatza, The Wizardry of Greg Hatza (Coral, 1967)
- Greg Hatza, Organized Jazz (Coral, 1968)
- Tramaine Hawkins, The Search Is Over (A&M, 1986)
- Joe Higgs, Life of Contradiction (Micron Music, 1975)
- Johnny Hodges, Blue Notes (Verve, 1966)
- Loleatta Holloway, Queen of the Night (Gold Mind, 1978)
- Loleatta Holloway, Love Sensation (Gold Mind, 1980)
- Red Holloway, The Burner (Prestige, 1964)
- Richard Holmes, I'm in the Mood for Love (Flying Dutchman, 1976)
- Stix Hooper, Lay It On the Line (Artful Balance, 1989)
- Lena Horne & Gábor Szabó, Lena & Gabor (Skye, 1969)
- Bobbi Humphrey, Freestyle (Epic, 1978)
- Bobbi Humphrey, The Good Life (Epic, 1979)
- Weldon Irvine, Sinbad (RCA Victor, 1976)
- Michael Jackson, Bad (Epic, 1987)
- Illinois Jacquet, Spectrum (Argo, 1965)
- Al Jarreau, Tenderness (Warner Bros., 1994)
- Al Jarreau, Live at Montreux 1993 (Eagle, 2016)
- Billy Joel, 52nd Street (Columbia, 1978)
- Billy Joel, An Innocent Man (Columbia, 1983)
- J. J. Johnson and Kai Winding, Israel (A&M, 1968)
- J. J. Johnson and Kai Winding, Betwixt & Between (A&M, 1969)
- Salena Jones, My Love (JVC, 1981)
- Tamiko Jones, I'll Be Anything for You (A&M, 1968)
- Earl Klugh, Wishful Thinking (Capitol, 1984)
- Earl Klugh, Life Stories (Warner Bros., 1986)
- Al Kooper, You Never Know Who Your Friends Are (Columbia, 1969)
- Hubert Laws, The Chicago Theme (CTI, 1975)
- Hubert Laws, Romeo & Juliet (Columbia, 1976)
- Lightnin' Rod, Hustlers Convention (Celluloid, 1973)
- Kenny Loggins, Celebrate Me Home (Columbia, 1977)
- Galt MacDermot, Hair Pieces (Verve Forecast, 1968)
- Junior Mance, With a Lotta Help from My Friends (Atlantic, 1970)
- Chuck Mangione, Tarantella (A&M, 1981)
- Herbie Mann, Glory of Love (A&M, 1967)
- Herbie Mann, Unchain My Heart (A&M, 1968)
- Wade Marcus, A New Era (Cotillion, 1971)
- Hugh Masekela, Grrr (Mercury, 1966)
- Hugh Masekela, Home (Moonshine, 1982)
- Percy Mayfield, Sings Percy Mayfield (RCA Victor, 1970)
- Ullanda McCullough, Ullanda McCullough (Ariola, 1981)
- Gary McFarland, America the Beautiful (Skye, 1969)
- Jimmy McGriff, Cherry (Solid State, 1966)
- Essra Mohawk, Essra (Private Stock, 1976)
- Melba Moore, This Is It (Buddah, 1976)
- Melba Moore, Melba '76 (Buddah, 1976)
- Van Morrison, Blowin' Your Mind! (Bang, 1967)
- Idris Muhammad, House of the Rising Sun (Kudu, 1976)
- Idris Muhammad, Turn This Mutha Out (Kudu, 1977)
- Milton Nascimento, Yauaretê (CBS, 1987)
- Oliver Nelson, The Sound of Feeling (Verve, 1966)
- Oliver Nelson, Encyclopedia of Jazz (Verve, 1967)
- Felix Pappalardi, Don't Worry Ma (A&M, 1979)
- Peaches & Herb, Peaches & Herb (MCA, 1977)
- Teddy Pendergrass, TP (Philadelphia International, 1980)
- Teddy Pendergrass, This One's for You (Philadelphia International, 1982)
- Noel Pointer, Hold On (United Artists, 1978)
- Bernard Purdie, Soul Drums (Date, 1967)
- Chuck Rainey, The Chuck Rainey Coalition (Skye, 1972)
- Jerome Richardson, Groove Merchant (Verve, 1967)
- Tom Rush, The Circle Game (Elektra, 1968)
- Lalo Schifrin, Black Widow (CTI, 1976)
- Lalo Schifrin, Towering Toccata (CTI, 1977)
- Diane Schuur, Love Songs (GRP, 1993)
- Jimmy Scott, The Source (Atlantic, 1970)
- Doc Severinsen, Brand New Thing (Epic, 1977)
- Janis Siegel, Experiment in White (Atlantic, 1982)
- Carly Simon, Boys in the Trees (Elektra, 1978)
- Carly Simon, Hello Big Man (Warner Bros., 1983)
- Lucy Simon, Lucy Simon (RCA Victor, 1975)
- Paul Simon, One-Trick Pony (Warner Bros., 1980)
- Paul Simon, Hearts and Bones (Warner Bros., 1983)
- Nina Simone, Silk & Soul (RCA Victor, 1967)
- Nina Simone, Nina Simone Sings the Blues (RCA Victor, 1967)
- Nina Simone, To Love Somebody (RCA Victor, 1969)
- Nina Simone, Baltimore (CTI, 1978)
- Jimmy Smith, Respect (Verve, 1967)
- Jeremy Steig, Firefly (CTI, 1977)
- Sly Stone, High On You (Epic, 1975)
- Sonny Stitt, Little Green Apples (Solid State, 1969)
- Gábor Szabó, Macho (Salvation, 1975)
- Grady Tate, Windmills of My Mind (Skye, 1968)
- Grady Tate, Master Grady Tate (ABC Impulse!, 1977)
- Howard Tate, Howard Tate (Atlantic, 1972)
- Clark Terry, Mumbles (Mainstream, 1966)
- Bobby Timmons, Got to Get It! (Milestone, 1968)
- Phil Upchurch, Upchurch/Tennyson (Kudu, 1975)
- Thijs van Leer, Nice to Have Met You (CBS, 1978)
- Emiel van Egdom, This is for You (CD baby, 1989)Hybrid Groove (CD baby, 1996)
- Billy Vera, Storybook Children (Atlantic, 1968)
- Harold Vick, After the Dance (Wolf, 1977)
- Cedar Walton, Beyond Mobius (RCA Victor, 1976)
- Clarence Wheeler, The Love I've Been Looking For (Atlantic, 1971)
- Michael White, How Strong We Believe (Electric Bird, 1991)
- Cris Williamson, Cris Williamson (Ampex, 1971)

== See also ==
- Atlantic Records
