= Bill Withers discography =

Cataloging of published recordings by Bill Withers

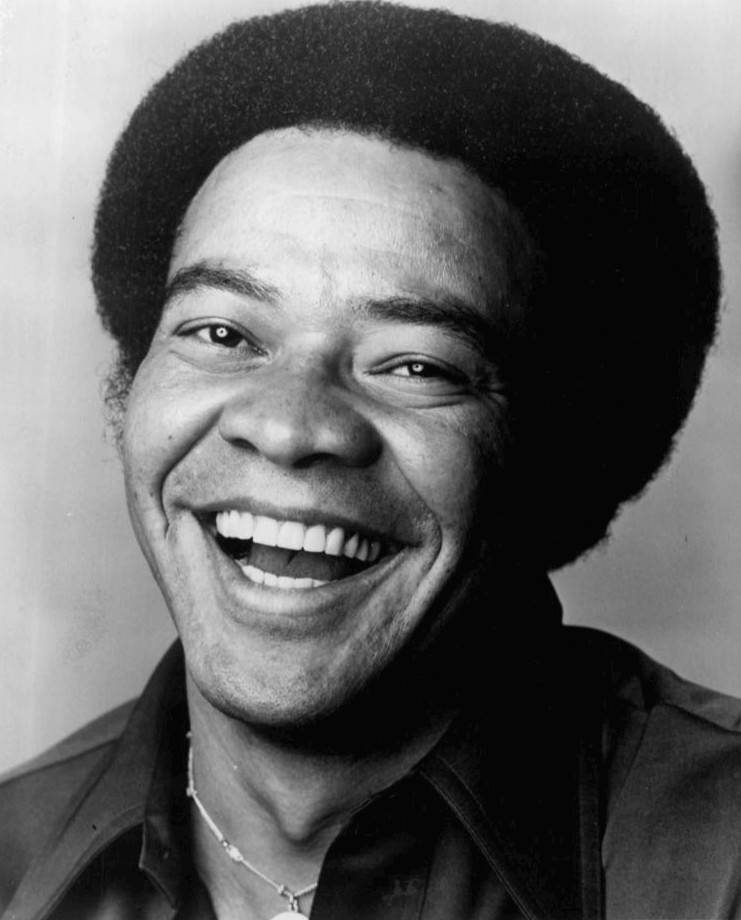
- Withers in 1976.
- Studio albums: 8
- Live albums: 1
- Compilation albums: 10
- Singles: 34

American singer-songwriter and musician Bill Withers (1938–2020) released eight studio albums, one live album, 10 compilation albums and 34 singles.

== Albums ==
=== Studio albums ===
Bill Withers studio albums
Title	Details	Peak chart positions				Certifications (sales threshold)
Title	Details	US	US R&B	CAN	UK	Certifications (sales threshold)
Just as I Am	Released: May 1, 1971; Label: Sussex Records; Formats: CD, digital download	39	9	37	—	
Still Bill	Released: May 1, 1972; Label: Sussex Records; Formats: CD, digital download	4	1	71	—	RIAA: Gold
+'Justments	Released: April 6, 1974; Label: Sussex Records; Formats: CD, digital download	67	7	—	—	
Making Music	Released: November 8, 1975; Label: Columbia Records; Formats: CD, digital download	81	7	—	—	
Naked & Warm	Released: November 6, 1976; Label: Columbia Records; Formats: CD, digital download	169	41	—	—	
Menagerie	Released: October 29, 1977; Label: Columbia Records; Formats: CD, digital download	39	16	55	27	RIAA: Gold
'Bout Love	Released: March 12, 1979; Label: Columbia Records; Formats: CD, digital download	134	50	—	—	
Watching You, Watching Me	Released: May 25, 1985; Label: Columbia Records; Formats: CD, digital download	143	42	—	60	
"—" denotes a recording that did not chart or was not released in that territory.

=== Live albums ===
Bill Withers live albums
Title	Details	Peak chart positions		
Title	Details	US	US R&B	UK
Live at Carnegie Hall	Released: 1973; Label: Sussex Records; Formats: CD, digital download	63	6	80

=== Compilation albums ===
Bill Withers compilation albums
Title	Details	Peak chart positions			Certifications (sales threshold)
Title	Details	US	US R&B	UK	Certifications (sales threshold)
The Best of Bill Withers	Released: 1975; Label: Sussex Records; Formats: CD, digital download	182	33	—	
The Best of Bill Withers	Released: 1980; Label: Columbia; Formats: CD, digital download	—	—	—	
Bill Withers' Greatest Hits	Released: 1981; Label: Columbia; Formats: CD, digital download	183	58	90	RIAA: Gold; BPI: Gold
Lean on Me: The Best of Bill Withers	Released: 1994; Label: Legacy Recordings; Formats: CD, digital download	131	—	—	
The Best of Bill Withers: Lovely Day	Released: 1998; Label: Sony Music; Formats: CD, digital download	—	—	—	
The Best of Bill Withers: Lean on Me	Released: 2000; Label: Legacy Recordings; Formats: CD, digital download	—	—	—	
The Ultimate Bill Withers Collection (2CD)	Released: 2000; Label: Sony Music Entertainment; Formats: CD, digital download	—	—	—	
Lovely Day: The Very Best of Bill Withers	Released: 2005; Label: Sony Music Entertainment; Formats: CD, digital download	—	—	35	BPI: Silver
Ain't No Sunshine: The Best of Bill Withers	Released: 2008; Label: Music Club Deluxe; Formats: CD, digital download	—	—	—	
Playlist: The Very Best of Bill Withers	Released: 2009; Label: Sussex, Columbia, Legacy; Formats: CD, digital download	—	—	—	
The Essential Bill Withers	Released: August 20, 2013; Label: Columbia, Legacy; Formats: CD, digital download	—	—	—	
The Ultimate Collection	Released: 2017; Label: Columbia, Legacy; Formats: CD, digital download	—	—	10	BPI: Gold
"—" denotes a recording that did not chart or was not released in that territory.

== Singles ==
Bill Withers singles
Year	Title	Peak chart positions										Certifications (sales threshold)	Album
Year	Title	US	US R&B	US A/C	AUS	BEL (FL)	CAN	FRA	NL	NZ	UK	Certifications (sales threshold)	Album
1967	"Three Nights and a Morning" (Note: B-side: "What I'll Do")	—	—	—	—	—	—	—	—	—	—		Non-album single
1971	"Harlem" (Note: B-side: "Moanin' and Groanin'")	—	—	—	—	—	—	—	—	—	—		Just as I Am
1971	"Ain't No Sunshine" (Note: B-side: "Harlem")	3	6	2	17	17	9	73	19	—	40 (Note: The original version of "Ain't No Sunshine" did not chart on the UK Singles Chart until 2009, 38 years after its release.)	ARIA: Platinum; RIAA: 4× Platinum; BPI: 2× Platinum; RMNZ: 5× Platinum	Just as I Am
1971	"Grandma's Hands" (Note: B-side: "Sweet Wanomi")	42	18	16	—	—	37	—	—	—	—		Just as I Am
1972	"Lean on Me" (Note: B-side: "Better Off Dead" (from Just as I Am))	1	1	4	24	—	20	—	—	—	18	ARIA: Platinum; RIAA: Gold; BPI: Platinum; RMNZ: 2× Platinum	Still Bill
1972	"Use Me" (Note: B-side: "Let Me in Your Life")	2	2	14	—	—	33	—	—	—	—	RIAA: Gold; BPI: Silver; RMNZ: Gold	Still Bill
1972	"Let Us Love" (Note: B-side: "The Gift of Giving")	47	17	33	—	—	75	—	—	—	—		Non-album single
1973	"Kissing My Love" (Note: B-side: "I Don't Know")	31	12	—	—	—	65	—	—	—	—		Still Bill
1973	"Friend of Mine" (Note: B-side: "Lonely Town, Lonely Street")	80	25	—	—	—	—	—	—	—	—		Bill Withers Live at Carnegie Hall
1974	"The Same Love That Made Me Laugh" (Note: B-side: "Make a Smile for Me")	50	10	—	—	—	39	—	—	—	—		+'Justments
1974	"You" (Note: B-side: "Stories")	—	15	—	—	—	—	—	—	—	—		+'Justments
1974	"Heartbreak Road" (Note: B-side: "Ruby Lee")	89	13	—	—	—	—	—	—	—	—		+'Justments
1975	"It's All Over Now" (Note: B-side by Bobby Womack: "Doing It My Way") (with Bobby Womack)	—	68	—	—	—	—	—	—	—	—		Non-album single
1975	"Harlem" (Note: B-side: "Who Is He (and What Is He to You)" (from Still Bill))	—	—	—	—	—	—	—	—	—	—		Just as I Am
1975	"Make Love to Your Mind" (Note: B-side: "I Love You Dawn")	76	10	—	—	—	—	—	—	—	—		Making Music
1976	"I Wish You Well" (Note: B-side: "She's Lonely")	—	54	—	—	—	—	—	—	—	—		Making Music
1976	"Hello Like Before" (Note: B-side: "Family Table")	—	—	—	—	—	—	—	—	—	—		Making Music
1976	"If I Didn't Mean You Well" (Note: B-side: "My Imagination")	—	74	—	—	—	—	—	—	—	—		Naked & Warm
1977	"Close to Me" (Note: B-side: "I'll Be with You")	—	88	—	—	—	—	—	—	—	—		Naked & Warm
1977	"Lovely Day" (Note: B-side: "It Ain't Because of Me Baby")	30	6	25	—	—	23	—	24	29	7	ARIA: Platinum; BPI: 2× Platinum; RIAA: 2× Platinum; RMNZ: 5× Platinum	Menagerie
1978	"Lovely Night for Dancing" (Note: B-side: "I Want to Spend the Night")	—	75	—	—	—	—	—	—	—	—		Menagerie
1979	"Don't It Make It Better" (Note: B-side: "Love Is")	—	30	—	—	—	—	—	—	—	—		'Bout Love
1979	"You Got the Stuff" -- Part 1 (Note: B-side: Part 2)	—	85	—	—	—	—	—	—	—	—		'Bout Love
1981	"Just the Two of Us" (Note: B-side: B-side by Grover Washington Jr.: "Make Me a Memory") (by Grover Washington Jr. featuring Bill Withers)	2	3	2	31	16	10	—	16	24	34	BPI: Platinum; RMNZ: 2× Platinum	Bill Withers' Greatest Hits
1981	"U.S.A." (Note: B-side: "Paint Your Pretty Picture" (from Making Music))	—	83	—	—	—	—	—	—	—	—		Non-album singles
1984	"In the Name of Love" (Note: B-side: B-side by Ralph MacDonald: "Play Pen") (with Ralph MacDonald)	58	13	6	—	—	—	—	48	—	95		Non-album singles
1985	"Oh Yeah!" (Note: B-side: "Just Like the First Time" (Non-album track))	106	22	40	—	—	—	—	—	—	60		Watching You Watching Me
1985	"Something That Turns You On" (Note: B-side: "You Try to Find a Love")	—	46	—	—	—	—	—	—	—	—		Watching You Watching Me
1987	"Lovely Day" (Note: B-side: "Oh Yeah" (from Watching You Watching Me)) (re-release)	—	—	—	—	—	—	—	—	—	92		Menagerie
1988	"Lovely Day" (Note: B-side: "Lovely Day" (Original version from Menagerie)) (Sunshine mix)	—	—	—	—	8	—	—	12	—	4		Lovely Days (UK release only)
1988	"Ain't No Sunshine" (Note: B-side: "Ain't No Sunshine" (Original version from Just as I Am)) (The Total Eclipse mix)	—	—	—	—	33	—	—	26	—	82		Lovely Days (UK release only)
1990	"Harlem" (Note: B-side: "Harlem" (Original version from Just as I Am)) (Street mix)	—	—	—	—	—	—	—	—	—	98		Lovely Days (UK release only)
"—" denotes a recording that did not chart or were not released.

== Other appearances ==
Other recordings by Bill Withers
Year	Title	Album	Artist	Reference(s)
1971	"Theme From "Man And Boy" ("Better Days")"	Soundtrack for Man and Boy	J.J. Johnson	
1980	"Just the Two of Us"	Winelight	Grover Washington Jr.	
1982	"Apple Pie"	Dreams in Stone	Michel Berger	
2011	"Use Me" (live November 4, 1972)	The Best of Soul Train Live	various	
