= The Essential Bill Withers =

2013 compilation album by Bill Withers

Compilation album by Bill Withers
- Released: August 20, 2013
- Genre: R&B
- Length: 2:15:36
- Label: Columbia Records, Legacy Records
- Producer: Booker T. Jones, Benorce Blackmon, Bill Withers, James Gadson, Melvin Dunlap, Ray Jackson, James Gadson, Larry Nash, Keni Burke, Clarence McDonald, Cliff Coulter, Paul Smith, Stix Hooper, Joe Sample, Wilton Felder

Bill Withers chronology
Playlist: The Very Best of Bill Withers (2009)	The Essential Bill Withers (2013)

The Essential Bill Withers is a 34-track anthology of American recording artist Bill Withers. First released on August 20, 2013, it features all of Withers' notable singles, along with other highlights from the singer's albums for the Sussex and Columbia labels, from his debut Just as I Am (1971) through his final album Watching You, Watching Me (1985), and including "Ain't No Sunshine", "Lean on Me", "Use Me", "Lovely Day", and "The Same Love That Made Me Laugh".

== Reception ==
Professional ratings
Review scores
Source	Rating
AllMusic	4/5 stars

- Jack Goodstein from Blogcritics says: "His songs are sometimes highly personal, whether he seems to be looking back on his West Virginia boyhood in 'Grandma’s Hands,' or looking for love in the lyrical 'Let Me in Your Life'. He can create a persona to voice his concerns with greater social issues as he does with the alcoholic speaker in the grimly tragic 'Better Off Dead', or the disabled veteran in 'I Can't Write Left-Handed'. But of course it is love in all its forms (especially unrequited, the theme of all the great soulful blues) that is his most common theme."
- Soul Tracks Reviewer Howard Dukes says that: "So hearing the tune on the compilation The Essential Bill Withers brought back some memories. Hearing that song also got me thinking about Withers as a songwriter. Withers is a great lyricist, so it's not surprising that other artists cover his songs. Some of those covers come instantly to mind – the Club Nouveau cover of 'Lean on Me' or Meshell Ndegeocello's cover of 'Who Is He and What Is He to You'. Jon Lucien and Nancy Wilson remade 'Hello Like Before',” and several artists have covered 'Grandma's Hands', including Gil-Scot Heron."

== Track listing ==
=== Disc 1 ===
All tracks are written by Bill Withers, except where noted.

No.	Title	Writer(s)	Originally from	Length
1.	"Better Days (Theme from Man and Boy)"	Bill Withers, J.J. Johnson	Man and Boy (1971)	3:28
2.	"Ain't No Sunshine"		Just as I Am (1971)	2:06
3.	"Harlem"		Just as I Am (1971)	3:23
4.	"Grandma's Hands"		Just as I Am (1971)	2:02
5.	"Hope She'll Be Happier"		Just as I Am (1971)	3:50
6.	"Better Off Dead"		Just as I Am (1971)	2:16
7.	"Lonely Town, Lonely Street"		Still Bill (1972)	3:41
8.	"Let Me in Your Life"		Still Bill (1972)	2:42
9.	"Who Is He (And What Is He to You)?"	Withers, Stanley McKenny	Still Bill (1972)	3:14
10.	"Use Me"		Still Bill (1972)	3:43
11.	"Friend of Mine" (live)		Live at Carnegie Hall (1973)	4:29
12.	"I Can't Write Left Handed" (live)	Withers, Ray Jackson	Live at Carnegie Hall (1973)	6:46
13.	"Lean on Me"		Still Bill (1972)	4:18
14.	"Make a Smile for Me"		+'Justments (1974)	3:16
15.	"The Same Love That Made Me Laugh"		+'Justments (1974)	3:25
16.	"Heartbreak Road"		+'Justments (1974)	3:10
17.	"Railroad Man"	Withers, Melvin Dunlap	+'Justments (1974)	6:28

=== Disc 2 ===
No.	Title	Writer(s)	Originally from	Length
1.	"Family Table"	Withers, Diane Gonneau	Making Music (1975)	3:13
2.	"The Best You Can"	Withers, Benorce Blackmon	Making Music (1975)	2:24
3.	"Hello like Before"	Withers, John Collins	Making Music (1975)	5:30
4.	"I Wish You Well"		Making Music (1975)	3:58
5.	"Don't You Want to Stay?"	Withers, Dunlap, Jackson	Making Music (1975)	3:50
6.	"I'll Be with You"		Naked & Warm (1976)	3:11
7.	"My Imagination"		Naked & Warm (1976)	4:53
8.	"Lovely Day"	Withers, Skip Scarborough	Menagerie (1977)	4:16
9.	"I Want to Spend the Night"		Menagerie (1977)	3:42
10.	"Tender Things"		Menagerie (1977)	5:01
11.	"Let Me Be the One You Need"	Withers, Scarborough	Menagerie (1977)	4:45
12.	"Memories Are That Way"		'Bout Love (1978)	5:04
13.	"Soul Shadows" (featuring The Crusaders)	Joe Sample, Will Jennings	Rhapsody and Blues (1980)	6:24
14.	"Just the Two of Us" (featuring Grover Washington Jr.)	Withers, Ralph MacDonald, William Salter	Winelight (1980)	3:58
15.	"In the Name of Love" (featuring Ralph MacDonald)	Withers, MacDonald, Salter	Universal Rhythm (1984)	5:01
16.	"We Could Be Sweet Lovers"		Watching You Watching Me (1985)	3:28
17.	"Something That Turns You On"		Watching You Watching Me (1985)	4:26

== Personnel ==
- Mark Larson – Art Direction
- Leo Sacks, Marcia Withers – Compilation Producer
- Compiled By – Leo Sacks, Marcia Withers
- Directed By [Project] – Mike Cimicata
- Mastered By – Mark Wilder

== Charts ==
Chart (2020)	Position
Official New Zealand Music Chart	24
