= Bill Withers' Greatest Hits =

Compilation album by Bill Withers
- Released: 1981
- Genre: R&B
- Length: 36:08
- Label: Columbia
- Producer: Keni Burke

Bill Withers chronology
'Bout Love (1979)	Bill Withers' Greatest Hits (1981)	Watching You, Watching Me (1985)

Professional ratings
Review scores
Source	Rating
Allmusic	4/5 stars

Bill Withers' Greatest Hits is a compilation album featuring a selection of early hits by Bill Withers, released in 1981.

== Track listing ==
1. "Just the Two of Us" - 3:56
2. "Use Me" - 3:45
3. "Ain't No Sunshine" - 2:03
4. "Lovely Day" - 4:14
5. "I Want To Spend The Night" - 3:41
6. "Soul Shadows" - 3:33
7. "Lean On Me" - 4:17
8. "Grandma's Hands" - 1:59
9. "Hello Like Before" - 5:28
10. "Who Is He (And What Is He to You)?" - 3:12

== Charts ==
Chart (1981)	Peak position
US Billboard Top LPs & Tape	183
US R&B Albums	58
