= Still Bill (film) =

2009 documentary about Bill Withers

- DVD cover
- Directed by: Damani Baker; Alex Vlack
- Produced by: Damani Baker; Alex Vlack; Jon Fine; Andrew Zuckerman
- Starring: Bill Withers
- Cinematography: Damani Baker; Jon Fine; Ed Marritz
- Edited by: Jon Fine; Sakae Ishikawa
- Music by: Robert Burger; David Hoffman
- Production companies: Late Night and Weekends
- Distributed by: B-Side Entertainment
- Release dates: March 2009 (SXSW); January 27, 2010 (United States)
- Running time: 77 minutes
- Country: United States
- Language: English

Still Bill is a 2009 documentary film about musician Bill Withers. It received its world premiere at the 2009 South by Southwest Film Festival. The title is a reference to Withers' 1972 album of the same name.

== Premise ==
The film follows the life of Bill Withers, from his roots in West Virginia to his career in the United States Navy, to his famed musical career and post-retirement family life.

== Cast ==
- Bill Withers
- Jim Brown
- Cornell Dupree
- James Gadson
- Jim James
- Angélique Kidjo
- Ralph MacDonald
- Raul Midón
- Bill Russell
- Tavis Smiley
- Sting
- Cornel West

== Critical reception ==
The film received mostly positive reviews. On Metacritic, the film has a score of a 76 out of 100 based on reviews from 5 critics, indicating "generally positive reviews." On Rotten Tomatoes the film has an approval rating of 100% based on reviews from 6 critics.

Roger Ebert of the Chicago Sun-Times gave the film 3 1/2 out of 4 stars and wrote positively about the film except for one set-up interview with Cornel West and Tavis Smiley:

[Withers] still lives and survives as a happy man. Still Bill is about a man who topped the charts, walked away from it all in 1985 and is pleased that he did... Perhaps in an attempt to slip some "meaning" into the film, the documentarians Damani Baker and Alex Vlack arrange a conversation with the scholar Cornel West and Tavis Smiley from PBS. It feels like they're trying to lead Bill into heavy generalizations, but he won't go there. Withers seems as close to everyday Zen as I can imagine. He talks a great deal about his philosophy, to be sure, but it's direct and manifestly true: Make the most of your chances, do the best you can, stop when you're finished, love your family, enjoy life.

Mike Hale of The New York Times also thought the film was well done and mirrored Ebert's position on the interview with West and Smiley:

Offstage Bill Withers, the eternal hero of karaoke baritones, exhibits the same gift for aphorism and general soulfulness that informed hit songs like "Lean on Me" and "Ain't No Sunshine." This makes much of the biographical documentary Still Bill pleasant and even moving... A dialogue among Mr. Withers, the scholar Cornel West and the television host Tavis Smiley feels forced.
