= We Could Be Sweet Lovers =

1985 single by Bill Withers

Song by Bill Withers

from the album Watching You, Watching Me
- Language: English
- Released: 1985
- Genre: Pop
- Length: 3:26
- Label: Columbia
- Songwriter(s): Bill Withers
- Producer(s): Bill Withers, Denny Diante

"We Could Be Sweet Lovers" is a 1985 song written by Bill Withers from his final studio album Watching You, Watching Me.

The song is best known in New Zealand as a 1988 one-hit wonder by New Zealand band Holidaymakers, who released their version of the song under the title "Sweet Lovers". This version charted at number one in the New Zealand singles chart and held that position for six weeks.

== Holidaymakers version ==
"Sweet Lovers"

Single by Holidaymakers
- B-side: "Sensible Shoes"
- Released: 1988
- Recorded: Marmalade Studios, Wellington
- Genre: Pop
- Length: 3:40
- Label: Pagan
- Songwriter(s): Bill Withers
- Producer(s): Nigel Stone

Music video
- "Sweet Lovers" at NZ On Screen

In 1988, Wellington band Holidaymakers released a cover of the song in New Zealand. The single was a huge success in New Zealand, staying at number one for six weeks, ultimately being the biggest selling single of the year.

The group's follow-up single "Waiting in the Sunshine" briefly charted at number six. Holidaymakers split up soon after.

=== Music video ===
New Zealand director Fane Flaws was a friend of the band and did the shoot with no budget. The lampshades in the video all belonged to the band members, who were all asked to bring one along on the day. Flaw's creativity was rewarded with a Best Video award at the 1988 New Zealand Music Awards.

=== Awards ===
The band was awarded Best Single, Most Promising Group, Most Promising Male Vocalist and Most Promising Female Vocalist of the year at the 1988 New Zealand Music Awards for "Sweet Lovers", while the song's producer Nigel Stone was awarded both Best Producer and Best Engineer of the year. Music video director Fane Flaws rounded off the group's dominance of the 1988 awards by receiving Best Video.
