= The Same Love That Made Me Laugh =

Single by Bill Withers

from the album +'Justments
- B-side: "Make a Smile for Me"
- Released: April 1974
- Genre: Soul, funk
- Label: Sussex Records
- Songwriter: Bill Withers

Bill Withers singles chronology
"Friend of Mine" (1973)	"The Same Love That Made Me Laugh" (1974)	"Heartbreak Road" (1974)

"The Same Love That Made Me Laugh" is a song, composed and originally recorded by Bill Withers, which was included on his 1974 album +'Justments. Released as a single, it reached No. 50 on the U.S. Billboard Hot 100 chart and No. 10 R&B. The song reached the Top 40 in Canada.

== Chart history ==
Chart (1974)	Peak position
Canada RPM Top Singles	39
U.S. Billboard Hot 100	50
U.S. Billboard Hot Soul Singles	10
U.S. Cash Box Top 100	43

== Other versions ==
Diana Ross covered "The Same Love That Made Me Laugh" on her 1977 LP Baby It's Me.
