= Menagerie (album) =

Studio album by Bill Withers
- Released: October 29, 1977
- Recorded: 1977
- Studio: The Record Plant, Los Angeles, California; A&R Recording, New York City, New York
- Genre: Soul, R&B, disco
- Length: 38:26
- Label: Columbia
- Producer: Bill Withers, Keni Burke, Clarence McDonald, Cliff Coulter

Bill Withers chronology
Naked & Warm (1976)	Menagerie (1977)	'Bout Love (1979)

Menagerie is the sixth studio album by American R&B singer Bill Withers, released on October 29, 1977, through the Columbia label.

== Background ==
Menagerie is more uptempo and less introspective in feel than Withers' previous albums. None of the songs tackle intensely personal emotions of the kind which lent a dark edge to earlier Withers tracks such as "Use Me", "Better Off Dead" or "Who Is He (And What Is He to You)". The arrangements are also generally upbeat and breezy, with "I Want to Spend the Night" and "Tender Things" having a distinct Latin feel, and "Lovely Night for Dancing" and "She Wants To (Get On Down)" showing disco influences. The lead single "Lovely Day" has gone on to become one of Withers' signature songs, particularly in the UK, where it was a top 10 hit both on its original release and again in a remixed version in 1988.

== Release ==
Menagerie was released on October 29, 1977. The album peaked at No. 16 on the R&B chart and No. 39 on the Billboard 200, and is tied with his first album, Just as I Am as his second highest-charting album. It would later be certified gold by the RIAA, one of two albums by Withers to be certified gold. Additionally, it was Withers' biggest-selling album in the UK, where it reached No. 27.

== Reception ==
Professional ratings
Review scores
Source	Rating
AllMusic	4.5/5 stars
Christgau's Record Guide	C+

The album received mixed-to-positive reviews upon release. Robert Christgau noted, "'It's a Lovely Day' is his biggest hit since changing labels, and this compromise between the mush of Making Music and the muscle of Naked and Warm his biggest album. The compromise is an honest one, the success earned. I wish I could say they made me happier."

== Track listing ==
No.	Title	Writer(s)	Length
1.	"Lovely Day"	Bill Withers; Skip Scarborough	4:15
2.	"I Want to Spend the Night"	Withers	3:41
3.	"Lovely Night for Dancing"	Withers	5:51
4.	"Then You Smile at Me"	Withers; Clarence McDonald	4:54
5.	"She Wants To (Get On Down)"	Withers; Larry Nash	3:15
6.	"It Ain't Because of Me Baby"	Withers; Michael Jones	3:31
7.	"Tender Things"	Withers	5:02
8.	"Wintertime"	Cliff Coulter	3:17
9.	"Let Me Be the One You Need"	Withers; Scarborough	4:44

Reissue Bonus Tracks
No.	Title	Writer(s)	Length
10.	"Rosie"	Withers	4:11
11.	"Lovely Night for Dancing" (Single Version)	Withers	4:25
12.	"Let Me Be the One You Need" (Instrumental Version)	Scarborough; Withers	4:39

== Personnel ==
- Bill Withers – lead vocals (1–9), backing vocals (1–4, 6–9), guitar (2), keyboards (3)
- Ray Parker Jr. – guitar (1, 4–7)
- Clarence McDonald – keyboards (1, 4, 6, 7, 9), string arrangements (1, 6, 8), horn arrangements (6, 8), arrangements (7)
- Dean Gant – keyboards (2)
- Clifford Coulter – keyboards (5, 8), synthesizer solo (8)
- Mike Jones – synthesizers (6)
- Jerry Knight – bass (1, 4, 6)
- Keni Burke – bass (2, 3, 5, 7, 8, 9)
- Russ Kunkel – drums (1, 2, 7, 8, 9), shaker (1)
- Alvin Taylor – drums (3–6)
- Ralph MacDonald – percussion (1–4, 6–9)
- Paul Riser – horn arrangements (2–4, 9) string arrangements (2–5, 9)
- Charles Veal – concertmaster (1–4, 6–9)
- Pat Hodges – backing vocals (5)
- Denita James – backing vocals (5)
- Jessica Smith – backing vocals (5)

Production

- Bill Withers – producer (1–9)
- Clarence McDonald – producer (1, 4, 6, 7, 9)
- Keni Burke – producer (2, 3, 5)
- Clifford Coulter – producer (8)
- Bob Merritt – engineer
- Phil Jantaas – assistant engineer
- Roger Carpenter – design
- Lou Beach – illustration
- Elliot Gilbert – photography

== Charts ==
=== Weekly charts ===
Chart (1978)	Peak position
US Billboard 200	39
US Top R&B/Hip-Hop Albums (Billboard)	16

=== Year-end charts ===
Chart (1978)	Position
US Top R&B/Hip-Hop Albums (Billboard)	50

=== Singles ===
Year	Single	Chart positions		
Year	Single	Billboard Hot 100	US R&B	US A/C
1977	"Lovely Day"	30	6	25
1978	"Lovely Night for Dancing"	—	75	—
