= Paul Smith (pianist) =

American jazz pianist

- Born: Paul Thatcher Smith; April 17, 1922; San Diego, California, U.S.
- Died: June 29, 2013 (aged 91) Torrance, California, U.S.
- Genres: Jazz, bebop
- Instrument: Piano
- Spouse: Annette Warren (m. 1958)

Paul Thatcher Smith (April 17, 1922 – June 29, 2013) was an American jazz pianist. He performed in various genres of jazz, most typically bebop, but is best known as an accompanist of singers, especially Ella Fitzgerald.

== Early life ==
Smith was born in San Diego, California to parents, Lon Smith and Constance Farmer, who were vaudeville performers and encouraged his interest in music. He began studying piano at age 8, and led a jazz band in high school and became a professional musician at 19 with the Johnny Richards band.

== Later life and career ==
After playing with Richards in 1941 and spending 1943 to 1945 in the military, Smith worked with Les Paul (1946–1947) and Tommy Dorsey (1947–1949) before moving to Los Angeles and becoming a studio musician. Studio work took up much of his time: he worked as a staff musician for NBC and Warner Brothers, and for many years he was the musical director for Dinah Shore’s daytime talk show.

Smith recorded frequently both with his trios and as a soloist. In addition he is featured on work of artists such as Dizzy Gillespie, Anita O'Day, Buddy DeFranco, Louie Bellson, Steve Allen, Stan Kenton, Mel Tormé and others. He was the musical director on The Steve Allen Comedy Hour television show in the 1960s.

Between 1956 and 1978, Smith was active as a conductor and pianist for Ella Fitzgerald He continued to work with her until the early 1990s.

He also worked on film scores and his playing can be heard on the soundtracks of They Shoot Horses, Don't They? and Nickelodeon among some others.

Paul Smith was a friend and collaborator of composer and conductor Frank Comstock.

Smith died on June 29, 2013, in Torrance, California at the age of 91 of heart failure. He performed in Southern California nightclubs, including The Velvet Turtle in Redondo Beach during the 1980s and the Terranea Resort hotel until his death. He is survived by his wife of 54 years Annette Warren; his daughter, actress Lauri Johnson; two sons, Gary and Paul; eight grandchildren; and two great-grandchildren.

== Discography ==
=== As leader ===
- Liquid Sounds (Capitol, 1954)
- Cascades (New Liquid Sounds By Smith) (Capitol, 1955)
- Cool and Sparkling (Capitol, 1956)
- By the Fireside (Savoy, 1956)
- Delicate Jazz (Capitol, 1958)
- Latin Keyboard & Percussion (Verve, 1960)
- Brazilian Detour (Warner Bros., 1966)
- Intensive Care (Pausa, 1984)
- Paul Smith Plays Steve Allen (Pausa, 1985)
- Charlie Parker for Piano (Granite, 1987)

=== As sideman ===
With Herb Alpert

- Rise (A&M, 1979)

With Chet Baker

- Albert's House (Beverley Hills, 1969)

With Buddy Bregman

- Swinging Kicks (Verve, 1957)

With June Christy

- Something Cool (Capitol, 1953-55)

With Bing Crosby

- Bing Sings Whilst Bregman Swings (Verve, 1956)
- A Southern Memoir (1975, London Records)
- Bingo Viejo (1975, London Records)

With Ella Fitzgerald

- Ella Fitzgerald Sings the Cole Porter Song Book (Verve, 1956)
- Ella Fitzgerald Sings the Duke Ellington Song Book (Verve, 1958)
- Ella Fitzgerald Sings the George and Ira Gershwin Song Book (Verve, 1959)
- Ella in Berlin: Mack the Knife (Verve, 1960)
- Ella Fitzgerald Sings Songs from "Let No Man Write My Epitaph" (Verve, 1960)
- Ella Fitzgerald Sings the Harold Arlen Songbook (Verve, 1961)
- Twelve Nights in Hollywood (Verve, 1961-62 [2009])
- Ella Fitzgerald Sings the Johnny Mercer Song Book (Verve, 1964)
- Dream Dancing (Pablo, 1978)
- Digital III at Montreux (Pablo, 1979)

With Ella Fitzgerald and Louis Armstrong

- Porgy and Bess (Verve, 1957)

With Ella Fitzgerald and Count Basie

- A Perfect Match (Pablo, 1979)

With Plas Johnson

- This Must Be the Plas (Capitol, 1959)

With Buddy Rich

- Buddy Rich Just Sings (1957, Verve)

With various artists

- Jazz at the Philharmonic – Yoyogi National Stadium, Tokyo 1983: Return to Happiness (1983, Pablo)

With Bill Withers

- 'Bout Love (Columbia, 1978)

With Frank Zappa and his Abnuceals Emuukha Electric Symphony Orchestra

- Lumpy Gravy (Capitol, 1967)
