= Jazz at the Philharmonic – Yoyogi National Stadium, Tokyo 1983: Return to Happiness =

Jazz at the Philharmonic - Yoyogi National Stadium, Tokyo 1983: Return to Happiness

Live album by Various Artists
- Released: 1983
- Recorded: October 1983
- Venue: Yoyogi National Stadium, Tokyo, Japan
- Genre: Jazz
- Length: 145:31
- Label: Pablo
- Producer: Norman Granz

Jazz at the Philharmonic – Yoyogi National Stadium, Tokyo 1983: Return to Happiness is a live album that was released in 1983. The album includes Louie Bellson, Eddie "Lockjaw" Davis, Harry "Sweets" Edison, Ella Fitzgerald, Al Grey, J. J. Johnson, Joe Pass, Niels-Henning Ørsted Pedersen, Oscar Peterson, Zoot Sims, and Clark Terry.

Shin Watanabe, a music publisher in Japan, wanted to mark the thirtieth anniversary of the first visit by Jazz at the Philharmonic to Japan in 1953. He contacted record producer Norman Granz to organize a concert. Since the first concert in 1953, several of the musicians had died, such as Gene Krupa, Ben Webster, and Willie Smith. Fitzgerald performed with her band of Keter Betts, Bobby Durham, and Paul Smith. Their performance occupies disc two of the two-disc CD.

== Track listing ==
1. "Sunday" (Chester Conn, Benny Krueger, Nathan "Ned" Miller, Jule Styne) – 10:25
2. "Undecided" (Sid Robins, Charlie Shavers) – 10:42
3. "I Can't Get Started" (Vernon Duke, Ira Gershwin) – 2:43
4. "God Bless the Child" (Arthur Herzog, Jr., Billie Holiday) – 3:16
5. "Ain't Misbehavin'" (Harry Brooks, Andy Razaf, Fats Waller) – 3:14
6. "Memories of You" (Eubie Blake, Razaf) – 2:59
7. "Emily" (Johnny Mandel, Johnny Mercer) – 1:56
8. "These Foolish Things (Remind Me of You)" (Harry Link, Holt Marvell, Jack Strachey) – 2:33
9. "Misty" (Johnny Burke, Erroll Garner) – 3:14
10. "What's New?" (Burke, Bob Haggart) – 3:01
11. "Don't Blame Me" (Dorothy Fields, Jimmy McHugh) – 2:35
12. "But Beautiful" (Burke, Jimmy Van Heusen) – 2:31
13. "My Romance" (Lorenz Hart, Richard Rodgers) – 2:46
14. "When Lights Are Low" (Benny Carter, Spencer Williams) – 3:18
15. "Spotlite" (Coleman Hawkins) – 9:24
16. "Peace" (Oscar Peterson) – 7:46
17. "Shining Hour" (Ernest Gold) – 4:52
18. "Mississauga Rattler" (Peterson) – 6:32
19. "Alice in Wonderland" (Sammy Fain, Bob Hilliard) – 7:17
20. "City Lights" (Peterson) – 6:39
21. "Blues" (Peterson) – 4:10
22. "Manteca" (Dizzy Gillespie, Gil Fuller, Chano Pozo) – 2:31
23. "Willow Weep for Me" (Ann Ronell) – 5:27
24. "All of Me" (Harold Marks, Seymour Simons) – 3:56
25. "Blue Moon" (Hart, Rodgers) – 4:04
26. "Night and Day" (Cole Porter) – 4:18
27. "They Can't Take That Away from Me" (George Gershwin, I. Gershwin) – 3:43
28. Medley: "The Man I Love"/"Body and Soul" (G. Gershwin, I. Gershwin)/(Edward Heyman, Robert Sour, Frank Eyton, Johnny Green) – 5:43
29. "'Round Midnight" (Bernie Hanighen, Thelonious Monk, Cootie Williams) – 4:06
30. "Flying Home" (Benny Goodman, Lionel Hampton, Leo Robin) – 9:50

== Personnel ==
- Ella Fitzgerald – vocals
- Harry "Sweets" Edison – trumpet
- Clark Terry – trumpet, flugelhorn
- Eddie "Lockjaw" Davis – tenor saxophone
- Zoot Sims – tenor saxophone
- Al Grey – trombone
- J. J. Johnson – trombone
- Oscar Peterson – piano
- Paul Smith – piano
- Joe Pass – guitar
- Keter Betts – double bass
- Niels-Henning Ørsted Pedersen – double bass
- Louie Bellson – drums
- Martin Drew – drums
- Bobby Durham – drums

=== Production ===
- Norman Granz – producer
- Benny Green – liner notes
