= Live at Carnegie Hall (Bill Withers album) =

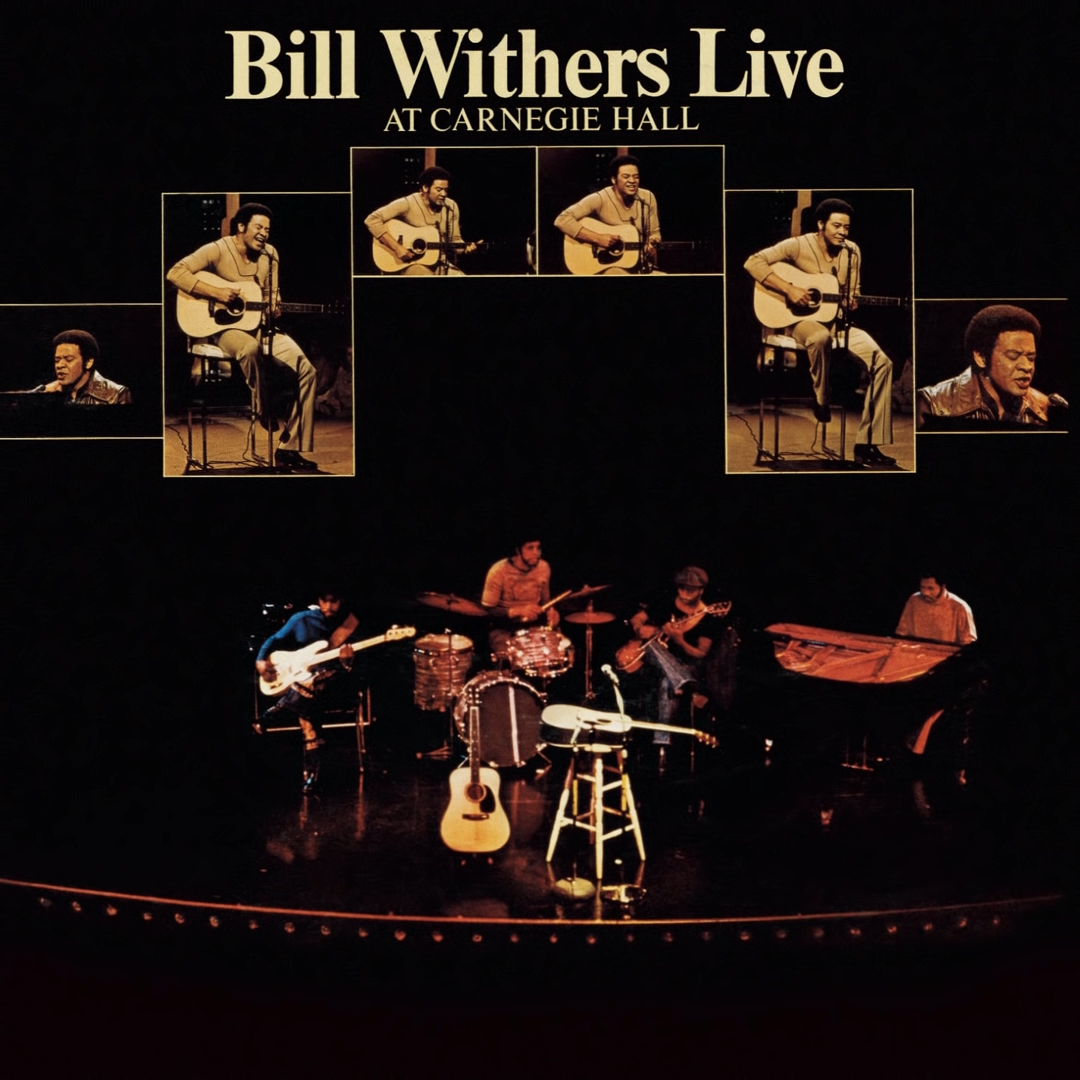

Live album by Bill Withers
- Released: April 21, 1973
- Recorded: October 6, 1972
- Venues: Carnegie Hall, New York City
- Genres: Soul, funk
- Length: 77:09
- Label: Sussex
- Producers: Benorce Blackmon, Bill Withers, James Gadson, Melvin Dunlap, Ray Jackson

Bill Withers chronology
Still Bill (1972)	Live at Carnegie Hall (1973)	+'Justments (1974)

Live at Carnegie Hall is a live album by American soul singer-songwriter and producer Bill Withers. The album was recorded on October 6, 1972, at Carnegie Hall in New York City and released on April 21, 1973, by Sussex Records as a double LP. On October 28, 1997, it was reissued as a single CD by Columbia/Legacy.

== Critical reception ==
Professional ratings
Review scores
Source	Rating
AllMusic	4/5 stars
Christgau's Record Guide	A−
The Rolling Stone Album Guide	3.5/5 stars
The Village Voice	A

Reviewing in Christgau's Record Guide: Rock Albums of the Seventies (1981), Robert Christgau wrote: "Hearing Withers urge the audience on, as drummer James Gadson and pianist-arranger Ray Jackson drive their crack combo, really wipes out the man's MOR aura—nobody else in the music combines hard rhythms and warm sensuality so knowingly. A natural shouter who raises his voice judiciously and a deliberate wryly moralistic rapper, his authority comes through even when you can't see him frowning mildly in his unshowy Saturday-night sports clothes. Two of the five new songs lean on friendship themes, and that's one too many, but the old ones are live indeed. Knockout: the encore, 'Harlem/Cold Baloney,' all 13:07 of it." He was more enthusiastic about the album years later in The Village Voice, arguing that it functions as Withers' "legacy", "far more than best-ofs obliged to respect the career he maintained after this hypercharged 1972 night ... a moment of lost possibility":

Withers sang for a black nouveau middle class that didn't yet understand how precarious its status was. Warm, raunchy, secular, common, he never strove for Ashford & Simpson-style sophistication, which hardly rendered him immune to the temptations of sudden wealth—cross-class attraction is what gives "Use Me" its kick. He didn't accept that there had to be winners and losers, that fellowship was a luxury the newly successful couldn't afford. Soon sudden wealth took its toll on him while economic clampdown took its toll on his social context. But here he's turned on to be singing to his people—black folks who can afford Carnegie Hall.

Reviewing for AllMusic, Steven McDonald called Live at Carnegie Hall one of the best concert recordings from the 1970s and "a wonderful live album that capitalizes on Withers' trademark melancholy soul sound while expanding the music to fit the room granted by a live show". Daryl Easlea from BBC Music said, "It is up there with James Brown's Live at the Apollo 1962, Aretha's Amazing Grace or Van Morrison's It's Too Late To Stop Now for allowing you to truly share the live experience of an artist at their pinnacle." In 2015, Rolling Stone ranked the recording 27th on the magazine's list of the 50 greatest live albums of all time.

== Track listing ==
All tracks composed by Bill Withers; except where indicated

Side 1

1. "Use Me" – 8:30
2. "Friend of Mine" – 4:26
3. "Ain't No Sunshine" – 2:25
4. "Grandma's Hands - with Rap" – 5:08

Side 2

1. "World Keeps Going Around" – 5:08
2. "Let Me in Your Life - with Rap" – 4:35
3. "Better Off Dead" – 3:36
4. "For My Friend" – 2:58

Side 3

1. "I Can't Write Left Handed" (Withers, Ray Jackson) – 6:52
2. "Lean On Me" – 5:47
3. "Lonely Town Lonely Street" – 3:54
4. "Hope She'll Be Happier" – 4:23

Side 4

1. "Let Us Love" – 5:21
2. "Harlem/Cold Baloney" – 13:07

== Personnel ==
- Bill Withers – vocals, guitar, piano
- Benorce Blackmon – guitar
- Melvin Dunlap – bass
- Ray Jackson – piano, string and horn arrangements
- James Gadson – drums
- Bobbye Hall – percussion

== Charts ==
Chart (2020)	Peak position
Belgian Albums (Ultratop Flanders)	97
Swiss Albums (Schweizer Hitparade)	47
UK Albums (Official Charts)	80
