= Winelight =

Studio album by Grover Washington Jr.
- Released: October 24, 1980
- Recorded: June & July 1980
- Studios: Rosebud Recording Studio, New York City
- Genres: Smooth jazz; R&B; soul jazz
- Length: 39:01
- Label: Elektra
- Producers: Grover Washington Jr., Ralph MacDonald

Grover Washington Jr. chronology
Skylarkin' (1980)	Winelight (1980)	Come Morning (1981)

Winelight is a 1980 studio album by jazz musician Grover Washington Jr. The record received the Grammy Award for Best Jazz Fusion Performance in 1982. The album was released by Elektra Records. It includes the Grammy Award-winning hit "Just the Two of Us" sung by Bill Withers. The track "In the Name of Love" from the album was also released in rearranged form, without Washington's saxophone track, under the name of Ralph MacDonald and Bill Withers (on vocals).

== Reception ==
Professional ratings
Review scores
Source	Rating
AllMusic	4.5/5 stars
The Penguin Guide to Jazz Recordings	3/4 stars
The Rolling Stone Jazz Record Guide	2.5/5 stars

The album, propelled by "Just the Two of Us", is often credited for leading to the 1980s smooth jazz explosion.

Scott Yanow of AllMusic describe the album as "a memorable set of high-quality and danceable soul-jazz".

== Track listing ==
Side One

1. "Winelight" (William Eaton) – 7:32
2. "Let It Flow (For "Dr. J")" (Grover Washington Jr.) – 5:52
3. "In the Name of Love" (William Salter, Ralph MacDonald) – 5:26

Side Two

1. "Take Me There" (Washington) – 6:16
2. "Just the Two of Us" (Bill Withers, William Salter, Ralph MacDonald) – 7:23
3. "Make Me a Memory (Sad Samba)" (Washington) – 6:32

== Personnel ==
- Grover Washington Jr. – alto saxophone, soprano saxophone, tenor saxophone
- Richard Tee – Fender Rhodes (1, 3, 5, 6)
- Ray Chew – clavinet (1)
- Paul Griffin – clavinet (1), Fender Rhodes (2, 4)
- Ed Walsh – Oberheim Eight Voice (1–4, 6)
- Bill Eaton – Oberheim Eight Voice (5), arrangements and conductor
- Eric Gale – guitars
- Marcus Miller – bass
- Steve Gadd – drums
- Ralph MacDonald – congas, percussion, Syndrums
- Robert Greenidge – steel drums
- Hilda Harris – backing vocals
- Yvonne Lewis – backing vocals
- Ullanda McCullough – backing vocals
- Bill Withers – lead vocals (5)

== Production ==
- Grover Washington Jr. – producer
- Ralph MacDonald – producer
- Richard Alderson – engineer
- Ed Heath – assistant engineer
- Vlado Meller – mastering at CBS Studios (New York City).
- Paul Silverthorn – production coordinator
- Ron Coro – art direction, design
- Jim Shea – cover photography
- Don Hunstein – inner sleeve photography

== Charts ==
=== Album ===
==== Weekly charts ====
Chart (1980–81)	Peak position
Australia (Kent Music Report)	35
Canada Top Albums/CDs (RPM)	20
New Zealand Albums (RMNZ)	35
Norwegian Albums (VG-lista)	24
US Billboard Pop Albums	5
US Billboard Top Jazz Albums	1
US Billboard Top Soul Albums	2
UK Official Charts	34

Chart (2025–2026)	Peak position
French Jazz Albums (SNEP)	11
Hungarian Physical Albums (MAHASZ)	12

==== Monthly charts ====
Chart (2026)	Peak position
German Jazz Albums (Offizielle Top 100)	15

==== Year-end charts ====
Chart (1981)	Position
Canada Top Albums/CDs (RPM)	90
US Billboard 200	13

=== Singles ===
Year	Single	Chart positions			
Year	Single	US Pop	US R&B	US AC	UK
1981	"Just the Two of Us"	2	3	2	34

== Certifications ==
Certifications for Winelight
Region	Certification	Certified units/sales
Austria (IFPI Austria)	Gold	25,000^{*}
Spain (Promusicae)	Platinum	100,000^{^}
United Kingdom (BPI)	Silver	60,000^{^}
United States (RIAA)	2× Platinum	2,000,000^{^}
^{*} Sales figures based on certification alone.^{^} Shipments figures based on certification alone.
