= Watching You, Watching Me =

Studio album by Bill Withers
- Released: May 25, 1985
- Recorded: 1981, 1982, 1985
- Studio: The Complex, Los Angeles; Conway, Hollywood; Redwing, Los Angeles; Room 335, Los Angeles; Rosebud, New York City; Sunset Sound, Hollywood; Yamaha R&D Recording Studios
- Genre: Rhythm and blues
- Length: 45:32
- Label: Columbia/CBS
- Producer: Larry Carlton; Michel Colombier; Denny Diante; Don Freeman; Ralph MacDonald; Bill Withers

Bill Withers chronology
Bill Withers' Greatest Hits (1981)	Watching You, Watching Me (1985)	Lean on Me: The Best of Bill Withers (1994)

Singles from Watching You, Watching Me
- 1. "Oh Yeah!" Released: 1985; 2. "Something That Turns You On" Released: 1985

Watching You, Watching Me is the eighth and final studio album by American soul singer Bill Withers, released on Columbia Records in 1985. This was Withers' first release in six years and would prove to be his final album before he retired from popular music.

== Recording and release ==
Withers spent several years writing and recording music that Columbia Records' parent company CBS Records rejected, leading to a span of seven years between this and his previous studio album, 'Bout Love. The working relationship deteriorated to the point where Withers said that he wanted to explode a bomb at their headquarters but the artist and label collaborated on promoting the album; this included a tour with Jennifer Holliday.

Recording sessions and locations spanned at least four years:

- "Oh Yeah!" was recorded in 1985 at Room 335, Yamaha R&D Recording Studios, Sunset Sound Recorders, Conway Recording Studios
- "Something That Turns You On" was recorded in 1982 at Yamaha R&D Recording Studios
- "Don't Make Me Wait" was recorded in 1985 at Redwing, Yamaha R&D Recording Studios, Sunset Sound
- "Heart in Your Life" was recorded in 1985 at Yamaha R&D Recording Studios
- "Watching You Watching Me" was recorded in 1981 at Rosebud, Yamaha R&D Recording Studios, Sunset Sound
- "We Could Be Sweet Lovers" was recorded in 1982 at Yamaha R&D Recording Studios
- "You Just Can't Smile It Away" was recorded in 1985 at Yamaha R&D Recording Studios, Sunset Sound
- "Steppin' Right Along" was recorded in 1982 at Yamaha R&D Recording Studios
- "Whatever Happens" was recorded in 1985 at Yamaha R&D Recording Studios
- "You Try to Find a Love" was recorded in 1985 at The Complex

The album was mixed at The Complex and Conway Studios, Los Angeles, California, and mastered at Bernie Grundman Mastering, Hollywood, California.

== Reception ==
During its eight-week run on the Billboard 200, the album peaked at 143 on June 28, 1985; the same week, it stalled at 42 in a 25-week run on the Top R&B/Hip-Hop Albums. Writing for Billboard, Nelson George called the release one of the best rhythm and blues albums of 1985, writing that it was "full of little pleasures". Years later, the editorial staff of AllMusic Guide awarded it three out of five stars but has not published a staff review; a discussion of the box set Original Album Classics says this has "limited appeal" and calls the two singles from the album inessential. In his 2020 obituary of Withers, Alexis Petridis of The Guardian wrote that the album contained fantastic songs but was hampered by 1980s production techniques. Stereogum published a list of Withers' best overlooked songs upon his death and included “We Could Be Sweet Lovers”, noting that it has staying power in his catalogue, even if the album is dated.

== Track listing ==
1. "Oh Yeah!" (music by Larry Carlton, David Foster, and Bill Withers; lyrics by Withers) – 4:04
2. "Something That Turns You On" (Withers) – 4:26
3. "Don't Make Me Wait" (music by Don Freeman and Withers; lyrics by Withers) – 4:02
4. "Heart in Your Life" (Withers) – 4:16
5. "Watching You Watching Me" (William Eaton) – 5:50
6. "We Could Be Sweet Lovers" (Withers) – 3:28
7. "You Just Can't Smile It Away" (Withers) – 4:42
8. "Steppin' Right Along" (Withers) – 5:46
9. "Whatever Happens" (music by Carlton and Withers; lyrics by Withers) – 3:15
10. "You Try to Find a Love" (music by Michel Colombier; lyrics by Withers) – 5:43

== Personnel ==
- Bill Withers – vocals; DX-7 synthesizer on "Oh Yeah!", "We Could Be Sweet Lovers" and "Steppin' Right Along"; tom toms on "Oh Yeah!"; strings on "Something That Turns You On" and "Heart in Your Life"; bass guitar on "Heart in Your Life"; effects on "Heart in Your Life"; piano on "Heart in Your Life"; synthesizer on "Heart in Your Life"; flute on "We Could Be Sweet Lovers"; clavinet on "Steppin' Right Along"; production on "Oh Yeah!", "Don't Make Me Wait", "Heart in Your Life", "Watching You Watching Me", "We Could Be Sweet Lovers", "You Just Can't Smile It Away", "Steppin' Right Along", "Whatever Happens" and "You Try to Find a Love"
- Alex Brown – vocal arrangement on "Something That Turns You On", ad-lib vocals on "We Could Be Sweet Lovers"
- Kendall Brown – engineering on "Watching You Watching Me"
- Robbie Buchanan – synthesizer on "Don't Make Me Wait", "Watching You Watching Me" and "You Just Can't Smile It Away"
- Larry Carlton – engineering on "Oh Yeah!", production on "Oh Yeah!"
- Ed Cherney – engineering on "Don't Make Me Wait" and "You Just Can't Smile It Away"
- Rick Clifford – assistant mixing
- Michel Colombier – bells on "Whatever Happens", synthesizer on "Whatever Happens", arrangement on "You Try to Find a Love", programming on "You Try to Find a Love", production on "You Try to Find a Love"
- Paulinho da Costa – percussion on "Oh Yeah!", "Heart in Your Life", "We Could Be Sweet Lovers", and "Steppin' Right Along"
- Denise Decaro – backing vocals on "Oh Yeah!"
- Denny Diante – co-production on "Oh Yeah!", production on "Don't Make Me Wait", "Heart in Your Life", "Watching You Watching Me", "Whatever Happens" and "You Try to Find a Love"
- Nancy Donald – art direction
- Nathan East – electric Fender bass guitar on "Oh Yeah!"
- David Foster – keyboards on "Oh Yeah!", arrangement on "Oh Yeah!"
- Don Freeman – bass guitar on "Don't Make Me Wait", clavinet on "Don't Make Me Wait", piano on "Don't Make Me Wait", synthesizer on "Don't Make Me Wait", bells on "We Could Be Sweet Lovers", steel drums on "We Could Be Sweet Lovers", DX-7 synthesizer on "We Could Be Sweet Lovers" and "Steppin' Right Along", vibraphone on "Steppin' Right Along", vocals on "Steppin' Right Along", strings on "Don't Make Me Wait" and "Steppin' Right Along", arrangement on "Don't Make Me Wait", production on "Don't Make Me Wait"
- M. B. Gordy – cymbal on "Something That Turns You On", tom toms on "Something That Turns You On" and "Steppin' Right Along", hi-hat on "Steppin' Right Along", tambourine on "Steppin' Right Along"
- Tony Lane – art direction
- Todd Gray – photography
- Lonnie Groves – backing vocals on "Watching You Watching Me"
- Bernie Grundman – mastering
- Mick Guzauski – engineering on "Oh Yeah!" and "You Try to Find a Love", mixing
- Eddie Heath – assistant engineering on "Watching You Watching Me"
- Larry Hirsch – engineering on "Oh Yeah!"
- Dann Huff – guitar on "Watching You Watching Me"
- Paul Jackson Jr. – guitar on "Don't Make Me Wait" and "You Try to Find a Love"
- Joe Kelly – guitar on "Steppin' Right Along"
- Michael Landau – guitar on "Oh Yeah!"
- Edie Lehmann – backing vocals on "Something That Turns You On", "We Could Be Sweet Lovers" and "You Just Can't Smile It Away"
- Yvonne Lewis – backing vocals on "Watching You Watching Me"
- Ralph MacDonald – percussion on "Watching You Watching Me", production on "Watching You Watching Me"
- Richard McKearnan – assistant mixing
- Kate Markowitz – backing vocals on "Something That Turns You On", "We Could Be Sweet Lovers" and "You Just Can't Smile It Away"
- Myrna Matthews – backing vocals on "Oh Yeah!"
- Marty McCall – backing vocals on "Oh Yeah!"
- Marcus Miller – bass guitar on "Watching You Watching Me", bells on "Watching You Watching Me", brass on "Watching You Watching Me", clavinet on "Watching You Watching Me", harpsichord on "Watching You Watching Me", synthesizer on "Watching You Watching Me", strings on "Watching You Watching Me"
- Phil Perry – backing vocals on "Something That Turns You On" and "We Could Be Sweet Lovers", ad-lib vocals on "Something That Turns You On", vocal arrangement on "Something That Turns You On"
- Greg Phillinganes – DX-7 synthesizer on "Heart in Your Life" and "Whatever Happens", piano on "Whatever Happens"
- Robert Popwell – bass slides on "Don't Make Me Wait"
- Sharon Rice – assistant mixing
- John Robinson – drums on "Oh Yeah!", "We Could Be Sweet Lovers" and "Steppin' Right Along"
- Denise Routt – vocal arrangement on "Something That Turns You On", "hots" vocals on "Steppin' Right Along"
- Hal Sacs – engineering on "Oh Yeah!"
- Keith Seppanen – synthesizer on "Something That Turns You On", Yamaha RX-11 synthesizer on "Heart in Your Life", engineering on "Oh Yeah!", "Something That Turns You On", "Heart in Your Life", "Watching You Watching Me", "We Could Be Sweet Lovers", "You Just Can't Smile It Away", "Steppin' Right Along" and "Whatever Happens"
- Paul Smith – clavinet on "Something That Turns You On"; synthesizer on "Something That Turns You On"; strings on "Something That Turns You On"; flute on "We Could Be Sweet Lovers"; DX-7 synthesizer on "We Could Be Sweet Lovers", "You Just Can't Smile It Away" and "Steppin' Right Along"; horns on "Steppin' Right Along"
- Maretha Stewart – backing vocals on "Watching You Watching Me"
- Tom Suefort – engineering on "Don't Make Me Wait"
- Richard Tee – Fender Rhodes electric piano on "Watching You Watching Me"
- Ernie Watts – saxophone solo on "You Just Can't Smile It Away"
- Buddy Williams – drums on "Watching You Watching Me"
- Frank Wolf – engineering on "Watching You Watching Me"
- Yolie – French backing vocals on "You Try to Find a Love"
- Erik Zobler – engineering on "Don't Make Me Wait"

== Charts ==
Watching You, Watching Me sales chart performance
Chart (1985)	Peak position
United Kingdom	60
US Billboard 200	143
US Billboard Top R&B Albums	42

Sales chart performance of singles from Watching You, Watching Me
Single	Year	Chart	Position
"Oh Yeah!"	1985	US Billboard Hot Black Singles	22
"Oh Yeah!"	1985	US Billboard Adult Contemporary	40
"Oh Yeah!"	1985	UK Singles	60
"Something That Turns You On"	1985	US Billboard Hot Black Singles	46
