= Lovely Day =

1977 single by Bill Withers

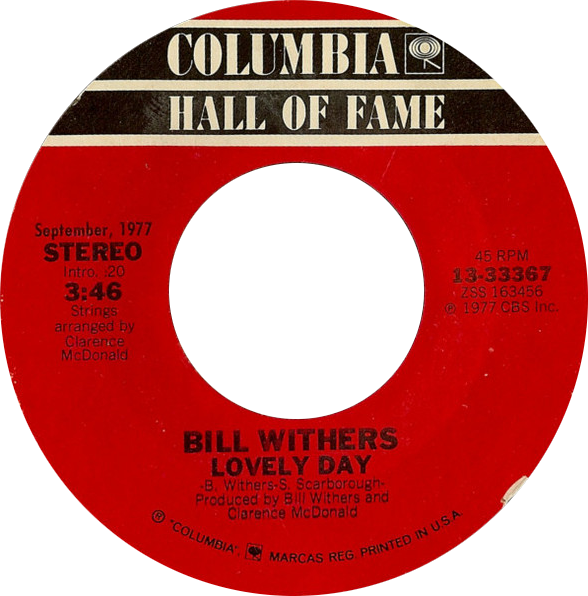
- Side B of the late-1970s US reissue

Single by Bill Withers

from the album Menagerie
- B-side: "It Ain't Because of Me Baby"
- Released: 1977
- Genre: R&B; soul; funk; disco
- Length: 3:46 (single version); 4:15 (album version)
- Label: Columbia
- Songwriters: Bill Withers; Skip Scarborough
- Producers: Bill Withers; Clarence McDonald

Bill Withers singles chronology
"Close to Me" (1977)	"Lovely Day" (1977)	"Lovely Night for Dancing" (1978)

Audio video
- "Lovely Day" on YouTube

"Lovely Day" is a song by American soul and R&B singer Bill Withers. Written by Withers and Skip Scarborough, it was released in 1977 by Columbia Records, and appears on Withers's sixth album, Menagerie (1977). Withers holds a sustained note towards the end that, at 18 seconds, is the longest of any top-40 hit in the United States. The song was listed at No. 402 on Rolling Stone's "Top 500 Best Songs of All Time" in 2021.

== Recording ==
Producer Clarence McDonald also arranged the original 1977 version of the song and played keyboards. Guitars were played by Ray Parker Jr., Jerry Knight played bass, and Russ Kunkel played drums.

Toward the end of the song, Withers holds a high E note for 18 seconds, the longest of any top-40 hit in the United States.

== History ==
Released as a single in late 1977, "Lovely Day" peaked at number 6 on the US Billboard R&B chart and at number 30 on the Billboard Hot 100 in early 1978. Outside of the United States, "Lovely Day" peaked within the top ten of the charts in the United Kingdom, where it peaked at number seven on the UK Singles Chart.

"Lovely Day" has been re-released as a single in the United Kingdom at least twice since the song's first chart run; in 1987 the original version charted again at number 92 on the UK Singles Chart, while a remix done by Ben Liebrand, named the "Sunshine Mix", peaked within the top 10 in 1988, peaking at number four on the UK Singles Chart. This remix resulted in renewed enthusiasm for the Withers original, which incurred a surge in airplay into the early 1990s and came to firmly overshadow the radio presence of Liebrand's version. Public interest was again piqued in 1995, when "Lovely Day" was used in adverts for Tetley tea, again in 1999 for a Gap commercial directed by Hype Williams, and yet again in 2020 in ads for Good Morning Football on NFL Network, an Allstate insurance TV commercial, as well as an ad for Pandora Jewelers. On January 20, 2021, the song was performed by Demi Lovato, with backing vocals from Lin-Manuel Miranda and several frontline healthcare workers amid the COVID-19 pandemic, as a part of the entertainment broadcast entitled Celebrating America following the inauguration of President Joe Biden.

== Personnel ==
- Bill Withers – vocals
- Clarence McDonald – keyboards
- Ray Parker Jr. – guitar
- Jerry Knight – bass guitar
- Russ Kunkel – drums, shaker
- Ralph MacDonald – percussion
- Charles Veal – concertmaster

== Charts ==
=== Weekly charts ===
Chart (1977–1978)	Peak position
Austria (Ö3 Austria Top 40)	18
Belgium (Ultratop)	11
Canada Top Singles (RPM)	23
Canada Adult Contemporary (RPM)	44
France (IFOP)	1
Netherlands (Dutch Top 40)	24
Netherlands (Single Top 100)	24
UK Singles (OCC)	7
US Billboard Hot 100	30
US R&B Singles (Billboard)	6
US Easy Listening (Billboard)	25
US Cash Box Top 100	23

Chart (1987–88)	Peak position
Ireland (IRMA)	7
UK Singles (OCC) (remix)	4
UK Singles (OCC) (original)	92

=== Year-end charts ===
Chart (1978)	Rank
Canada (RPM)	173
UK Singles (OCC)	85

Chart (1988)	Rank
UK Singles (OCC)	38

== Certifications ==
Region	Certification	Certified units/sales
Australia (ARIA)	Platinum	70,000^{‡}
Denmark (IFPI Danmark)	Platinum	90,000^{‡}
Germany (BVMI)	Gold	300,000^{‡}
Italy (FIMI) sales since 2009	Gold	35,000^{‡}
New Zealand (RMNZ)	5× Platinum	150,000^{‡}
United Kingdom (BPI)	2× Platinum	1,200,000^{‡}
United States (RIAA)	2× Platinum	2,000,000^{‡}
^{‡} Sales+streaming figures based on certification alone.

== The S.O.U.L. S.Y.S.T.E.M. version ==
"It's Gonna Be a Lovely Day"

Single by The S.O.U.L. S.Y.S.T.E.M.

from the album The Bodyguard: Original Soundtrack Album
- Released: 1992
- Genre: Soul; R&B; dance-pop; hip hop
- Length: 4:47
- Label: Arista
- Songwriters: Bill Withers; Skip Scarborough; Robert Clivillés; David Cole; Tommy Never; Michelle Visage
- Producers: Robert Clivillés; David Cole; Ricky Crespo

Music video
- "It's Gonna Be a Lovely Day" on YouTube

The song was covered by American R&B and dance music group the S.O.U.L. S.Y.S.T.E.M. featuring Michelle Visage, and was included on the soundtrack to the 1992 film The Bodyguard, starring Whitney Houston and Kevin Costner. This mostly rap version was titled "It's Gonna Be a Lovely Day" and was produced by Robert Clivillés, David Cole and Ricky Crespo. It reached number 34 on the US Billboard Hot 100 and number 44 on the Billboard R&B chart, in addition to spending three weeks atop the Billboard Hot Dance Club Play chart in December 1992 and January 1993. The song also reached number 17 on the UK Singles Chart, number one on the UK Club Chart and number two on the European Dance Radio Chart.

=== Critical reception ===
J.D. Considine from The Baltimore Sun remarked the "funk revisionism" of "It's Gonna Be a Lovely Day". In his weekly UK chart commentary, James Masterton wrote, "It's not the first time in recent years that the Bill Withers classic has had a chart outing, a remixed version having made the Top 10 in September 1988. The new version, however, is as far removed from this as can be and may just have enough novelty value not to be detracted by the cries of sacrilege from the purists." Parry Gettelman from Orlando Sentinel viewed it as "a throwaway dance track".

Charles Aaron for Spin said, "Clivilles & Cole's effortlessly escapist, double 12-inch extravaganza of house gimmicks is worth its price on packaging alone (the jacket could inspire a master's thesis). "Movin' the Crowd Club Mix" reintroduces Seduction's Michelle Visage, who boasts a breathy, offhand rhyme style, as if she's kickin' it in a fitting room at Bloomingdale's. The sample codes are less than fresh — Deee-Lite's 'What Is Love?', Soul II Soul's 'Get a Life', and a horn blast from Sly's 'You Can Make It If You Try' — but together, they construct quite a club ethos."

=== Music video ===
A music video was produced to promote the single and was later made available by VEVO on YouTube in 2014. It had generated more than 2.3 million views as of early 2024.

=== Charts ===
==== Weekly charts ====
Weekly chart performance for "It's Gonna Be a Lovely Day" by the S.O.U.L. S.Y.S.T.E.M.
Chart (1992–1993)	Peak position
Australia (ARIA)	90
Europe (Eurochart Hot 100)	58
Europe (European Dance Radio)	2
Europe (European Hit Radio)	25
Israel (Israeli Singles Chart)	19
Netherlands (Dutch Top 40 Tipparade)	5
Netherlands (Single Top 100)	62
New Zealand (Recorded Music NZ)	25
UK Singles (Official Charts)	17
UK Dance (Music Week)	2
UK Club Chart (Music Week)	1
US Billboard Hot 100	34
US Hot Dance Club Play (Billboard)	1
US Maxi-Singles Sales (Billboard)	1
US Cash Box Top 100	31

==== Year-end charts ====
Year-end chart performance for "It's Gonna Be a Lovely Day" by the S.O.U.L. S.Y.S.T.E.M.
Chart (1992)	Position
UK Club Chart (Music Week)	29

== Other versions ==
"Lovely Day" has been covered and sampled numerous times since Withers' original recording.

Among the most notable is one by British pop group Central Line, appearing on their 1983 album Choice; this version reached number 81 on the UK Singles Chart.

In 1998, Kirk Franklin interpolated the single in his song "Gonna Be a Lovely Day" from his fifth album The Nu Nation Project.

In 2006, Maroon 5 covered the song for the soundtrack of the children's movie Hoot, which played over the end credits and featured Withers himself on backing vocals.

In 2010, LL Cool J sampled the song in his single "LLovely Day".

English indie rock band Alt-J covered the song as a hidden track on their 2014 album This Is All Yours.

== Soundtrack appearances ==
- 2010: The song is featured in the film 127 Hours during the scene where Aron Ralston, on the second day of his horrific ordeal, makes a pulley to unsuccessfully release the rock trapping his arm. This song also features in the soundtrack of the movie.
- 2014: The song plays during Fritz’ interrogation and torture of Jake in the fifth episode of the television series Scandal’s season 4, entitled "The Key".
- 2016: The song is played during a montage towards the end of the film The Secret Life of Pets, as the pet owners return home.
- 2017: The song is featured in the closing scene of "Make Them Birds Fly", the second episode of the television series Snowfall, in which Franklin Saint is beaten and robbed by two gang members.
- 2025: The song is played in Fixed, in a montage where Bull faces the morning of his neutering procedure and the impending loss of his testicles.

== See also ==
- List of number-one dance hits (United States)
- List of number-one dance hits (UK)
