= +'Justments =

+ 'Justments

Studio album by Bill Withers
- Released: April 6, 1974
- Recorded: 1974
- Studios: Record Plant (Los Angeles, California); Dijobe Sound (Orange, California); Bill Withers' home
- Genres: Soul, funk
- Length: 37:56
- Label: Sussex
- Producers: Bill Withers, Melvin Dunlap, James Gadson

Bill Withers chronology
Live at Carnegie Hall (1973)	+ 'Justments (1974)	Making Music (1975)

Adjustments (stylized as +'Justments) is the third studio album by American soul singer-songwriter and producer Bill Withers. The album was released in April 6, 1974 through Sussex Records. It contains the hit single, "The Same Love That Made Me Laugh" (US #50, Canada #39), which charted during the spring of 1974.

== Reception ==
Professional ratings
Review scores
Source	Rating
AllMusic	3.5/5 stars
Christgau's Record Guide	B+

The album cover shows Withers writing the following explanation of the title:

Life like most precious gifts gives us the responsibility of upkeep. We are given the responsibility of arranging our own psyces [sic] to best benefit our survival. We have the choice of believing or not believing in things like God, friendship, marriage, love, lust or any number of simple but complicated things. We will make some mistakes both in judgement and in fact. We will help some situations and hurt some situations. We will help some people and hurt some people and be left to live with it either way. We must then make some adjustments, or as the old people back home would call them, "'JUSTMENTS".

The album features José Feliciano playing guitar on "Can We Pretend" and congas on "Railroad Man". Withers was a guest musician and composer on the 1973 Feliciano album Compartments.

Legal tussles between Withers and Sussex prevented further recording sessions until Columbia signed the singer a year later. Columbia bought Withers' back catalog, re-releasing his earlier hit records, but +'Justments was not reissued on CD until 2010.

== Track listing ==
All tracks are written by Bill Withers, except where noted.

No.	Title	Writer(s)	Length
1.	"You"		5:18
2.	"The Same Love That Made Me Laugh"		3:23
3.	"Stories"		2:42
4.	"Green Grass"		3:08
5.	"Ruby Lee"	Melvin Dunlap, Bill Withers	3:16
6.	"Heartbreak Road"		3:06
7.	"Can We Pretend"	Denise Nicholas	3:47
8.	"Liza"		3:02
9.	"Make a Smile for Me"		3:14
10.	"Railroad Man"	Melvin Dunlap, Bill Withers	6:24

== Personnel ==
- Bill Withers – lead and backing vocals, guitar (2, 9), acoustic piano (4), electric piano (5, 6, 9)
- Benorce Blackmon – guitar (1)
- José Feliciano – guitar (7), congas (10)
- Ray Jackson – electric piano (1, 2)
- John Barnes – acoustic piano (1, 3), electric piano (4)
- John Myles – electric piano (7, 8, 10), clavinet (10), string arrangements
- Melvin Dunlap – bass (1, 2, 4, 5, 6, 7, 9, 10)
- James Gadson – drums (1, 2, 4, 5, 6, 7, 9, 10)
- Chip Steen – congas (5, 10)
- Dorothy Ashby – harp (2, 3, 4, 7)

=== Production ===
- Bill Withers – producer
- Melvin Dunlap – producer
- James Gadson – producer
- Phil Schier – engineer
- Bobby Thomas – engineer
- Carl Overr – art direction
- John Van Hamersveld – design
- Norman Seeff – photography

Studios

- Recorded at Record Plant (Los Angeles, CA) and Dijobe Sound (Orange, CA).
- Mastered at Artisan Sound Recorders (Hollywood, CA).

== Charts ==
Chart (1974)	Peak position
Billboard Pop Albums	67
Billboard Top Soul Albums	7

=== Singles ===
Year	Single	Chart positions			
Year	Single	Billboard Hot 100	Cash Box Top 100	US R&B	RPM Magazine
1974	"The Same Love That Made Me Laugh"	50	43	10	39
1974	"You"	—	—	15	—
1975	"Heartbreak Road"	89	—	13	—
