= Making Music (Bill Withers album) =

Studio album by Bill Withers
- Released: November 8, 1975
- Recorded: 1975
- Studio: Record Plant (Los Angeles, California)
- Genre: Soul
- Length: 43:52
- Label: Columbia, CBS in UK
- Producer: Bill Withers, Larry Nash

Bill Withers chronology
+'Justments (1974)	Making Music (1975)	Naked & Warm (1976)

Making Music is the fourth studio album by American soul singer-songwriter and producer Bill Withers. The album was released in November 8, 1975. It was also released in the UK as Making Friends.

== Reception ==
Professional ratings
Review scores
Source	Rating
AllMusic	3/5 stars
Christgau's Record Guide	C+

Making Music was released in 1975 and is Withers' first album on Columbia Records due to Sussex Records folding in July 1975. The album charted at number seven on the R&B album charts. The album was released in the UK by CBS under the title of 'Making Friends' also in 1975.

== Track listing ==
All songs written by Bill Withers; except where noted.

1. "I Wish You Well" - 3:57
2. "The Best You Can" (Withers, Benorce Blackmon) - 2:33
3. "Make Love to Your Mind" - 6:23
4. "I Love You Dawn" - 2:36
5. "She's Lonely" - 5:15
6. "Sometimes a Song" (Withers, Raymond Jackson) - 4:44
7. "Paint Your Pretty Picture" - 5:43
8. "Family Table" (Withers, Diane Gonneau) - 3:13
9. "Don't You Want to Stay?" (Withers, Melvin Dunlap, Raymond Jackson) - 4:03
10. "Hello Like Before" (Withers, John Collins) - 5:29

== Personnel ==
- Bill Withers – lead and backing vocals, acoustic guitar
- Dennis Budimir – acoustic guitar
- George Johnson – electric guitar
- Ray Parker Jr. – electric guitar
- David T. Walker – electric guitar
- Wah-Wah Watson – electric guitar, guitar effects
- Larry Nash – keyboards, ARP synthesizer, melodica, rhythm arrangements
- Dave Grusin – keyboards (8), ARP synthesizer (8)
- Louis Johnson – bass (1–7, 9, 10)
- James Jamerson – bass (8)
- Harvey Mason – drums
- Ralph MacDonald – percussion
- Ernie Watts – soprano saxophone (10)
- Paul Riser – horn and string arrangements
- Tom Bahler – backing vocals
- Jim Gilstrap – backing vocals
- Augie Johnson – backing vocals
- Myrna Matthews – backing vocals
- Caroline Willis – backing vocals

Production

- Bill Withers – producer
- Larry Nash – producer
- Phil Schier – engineer
- Bob Merritt – assistant engineer
- John Brogna – design
- Ron Coro – design
- Ed Caraeff – photography

== Charts ==
=== Weekly charts ===
Chart (1975–1976)	Peak position
US Billboard 200	81
US Top R&B/Hip-Hop Albums (Billboard)	7

=== Year-end charts ===
Chart (1976)	Position
US Top R&B/Hip-Hop Albums (Billboard)	37

=== Singles ===
Year	Single	Chart positions	
Year	Single	US Hot 100	US R&B
1976	"I Wish You Well"	—	54
1976	"Make Love to Your Mind"	76	10
