= Naked & Warm =

Studio album by Bill Withers
- Released: November 6, 1976
- Recorded: 1976
- Studio: Record Plant (Los Angeles, California)
- Genre: Soul
- Length: 41:03
- Label: Columbia
- Producer: Bill Withers

Bill Withers chronology
Making Music (1975)	Naked & Warm (1976)	Menagerie (1977)

Professional ratings
Review scores
Source	Rating
AllMusic	3/5 stars
Christgau's Record Guide	B
Sounds	4/5 stars

Naked & Warm is the fifth studio album by American soul singer-songwriter and producer Bill Withers. The album was released on November 6, 1976, through Columbia Records.

== Track listing ==
All songs written by Bill Withers.

1. "Close to Me" - 3:55
2. "Naked & Warm (Heaven! Oh! Heaven!)" - 5:47
3. "Where You Are" - 3:54
4. "Dreams" - 5:34
5. "If I Didn't Mean You Well" - 3:04
6. "I'll Be with You" - 3:12
7. "City of the Angels" - 10:45
8. "My Imagination" - 4:52

== Personnel ==
- Bill Withers – lead vocals, backing vocals (3, 4)
- Benorce Blackmon – guitar (1, 2, 3, 6, 7, 8)
- Geoffrey Leib – guitar (1–8), electric piano (1, 7), acoustic piano (2, 3, 4, 6, 7)
- Clifford Coulter – Moog synthesizer (1, 4, 5)
- Don Freeman – electric piano (1–4, 6, 7), acoustic piano (5), synthesizer (7)
- Youseff Rahman – electric piano (2)
- Larry Nash – electric piano (8)
- Jerry Knight – bass (1, 3–7), backing vocals (2)
- Melvin Dunlap – bass (2)
- Larry Tolbert – drums (1–7)
- Earl "Crusher" Bennett – congas (1, 3–7, cowbell (1, 3–7), slapstick (1, 3–7), tambourine (1, 3–7), vibraslap (1, 3–7)
- Kwasi "Rocky" Dzidzornu – congas (1, 3)
- Dorothy Ashby – harp (2, 7, 8), obbligato vocals (2, 7, 8)
- Lenny Booker – backing vocals (2)
- Lois Booker – backing vocals (2)
- Helen Gonder – backing vocals (2)
- Marsha Johnson – backing vocals (2)

=== Production ===
- Bill Withers – producer
- Bob Merritt – engineer
- Phil Jamtaas – assistant engineer
- Rick Smith – assistant engineer
- Bernie Grundman – mastering
- Ken Anderson – design
- Tom Steele – design
- Elliot Gilbert – cover photography

Studios

- Recorded at Record Plant (Los Angeles, California).
- Mastered at A&M Studios (Hollywood, California).

== Charts ==
Chart (1976)	Peak position
Billboard Pop Albums	169
Billboard Top Soul Albums	41

=== Singles ===
Year	Single	Chart positions
Year	Single	US R&B
1976	"If I Didn't Mean You Well"	74
1977	"Close To Me"	88
