= Man and Boy (1971 film) =

1971 film by E.W. Swackhamer

- Directed by: E.W. Swackhamer
- Written by: Harry Essex; Oscar Saul
- Produced by: Marvin Miller
- Starring: Bill Cosby; Gloria Foster; Leif Erickson; George Spell; Douglas Turner Ward; John Anderson; Yaphet Kotto; Shelley Morrison; Henry Silva
- Cinematography: Arnold Rich
- Edited by: John A. Martinelli
- Music by: J. J. Johnson
- Production companies: J. Cornelius Crean Films Inc. Jemmin Inc.
- Distributed by: Columbia Pictures
- Release date: June 23, 1971
- Running time: 98 minutes
- Country: United States
- Language: English

Man and Boy is a 1971 American Western film directed by E. W. Swackhamer and starring Bill Cosby.

== Plot ==
In the wake of the American Civil War, an ex-soldier and his family move west to settle in lawless Arizona.

== Cast ==
- Bill Cosby as Caleb Revers
- Gloria Foster as Ivy
- Leif Erickson as Mossman
- George Spell as Billy
- Douglas Turner Ward as "Christmas"
- John Anderson as "Stretch"
- Henry Silva as Caine
- Dub Taylor as Atkins
- Yaphet Kotto as Nate
- Shelley Morrison as Rosita
- Richard Bull as Thornhill
- Robert Lawson as Lawson
- Jason Clark as "Red"
- Fred Graham as Himself
- Jack Owens as Himself

== Production ==
In 1970, Cosby made plans to have Man and Boy produced in six weeks. Marvin Miller, producer, said "We integrated our towns because that is the way it was." Filming began on January 11, 1971, in Scottsdale, Arizona After three weeks of production and $3500,000 spent and money running out, Miller contacted John Crean, a mobile home builder in Long Beach, California, to see about more financing. Crean liked that the film was going to be G-rated. Filming ended one week earlier than planned with a total cost of $800,000. At this time all of the major studios were looking to distribute the film. Del Shields, assistant producer, said there were six blacks on the production crew. More than normal on a movie set. Through Cosby's production company, Jemmin, Inc., Cosby noted that those who don't have money, will.

=== Music ===
Man and Boy's music was composed by J. J. Johnson. Quincy Jones arranged the soundtrack for the film.

== Release ==
Columbia Pictures released the film in June 1971.

=== Critical response ===
Roger Ebert wrote that Cosby reminded him of Will Rogers on film. The film does not have structure.
