= Just the Two of Us (Grover Washington Jr. song) =

1981 jazz and R&B single

Single by Grover Washington Jr. featuring Bill Withers

from the album Winelight
- B-side: "Make Me a Memory (Sad Samba)"
- Released: February 1981
- Genre: Jazz; R&B; smooth soul; quiet storm
- Length: 7:23 (album version); 3:58 (7-inch edit)
- Label: Elektra
- Songwriters: Bill Withers; Ralph MacDonald; William Salter
- Producers: Jonathan Johnson: Grover Washington Jr.; Ralph MacDonald

Grover Washington Jr. singles chronology
"Winelight" (1980)	"Just the Two of Us" (1981)	"Be Mine (Tonight)" (1982)

Bill Withers singles chronology
"You Got the Stuff" (1979)	"Just the Two of Us" (1981)	"I Want to Spend the Night" (1981)

Official audio
- "Just the Two of Us" on YouTube

"Just the Two of Us" is a song written by Bill Withers, William Salter, and Ralph MacDonald, and recorded by Grover Washington Jr. with Withers on vocals. Elektra Records released it on Washington's album Winelight on October 24, 1980. It also released as a single in February 1981. The single peaked at number 2 on the Billboard Hot 100 in the week ending May 2, 1981. Songwriters Withers, Salter and MacDonald won the Grammy Award for Best R&B Song at the 24th Annual Grammy Awards. Washington was nominated for Song of the Year and Best Male Pop Vocal Performance but did not win.

== Background ==
"Just the Two of Us" was written by Bill Withers, Ralph MacDonald and William Salter. MacDonald and Salter wrote the instrumental track and MacDonald contacted Withers, who wrote the lyrics. The song features performances by Bill Withers on vocals, Grover Washington Jr. on saxophone, Richard Tee on electric piano, Steve Gadd on drums, Eric Gale on guitar, and Marcus Miller on bass guitar.

== Composition ==
"Just the Two of Us" is in the key of F minor. The chord progression D♭^{maj7} – C^{7♭9} – Fm^{7} – E♭m^{7} A♭^{7} of its intro and verse can be thought of as a double-time modified reordering of the first four bars of the "Sunny" chord progression. "Just the Two of Us" restarts this progression but settles on the minor tonic: D♭^{maj7} – C^{7♭9} – Fm^{7}. Its chorus inserts an additional Em^{7} chord to chromatically descend from the first Fm^{7} to E♭m^{7} chord.

== Chart performance ==
The song reached number 2 on the US Billboard Hot 100, staying there for three weeks, behind "Morning Train (9 to 5)" by Sheena Easton and "Bette Davis Eyes" by Kim Carnes. It was Washington's only Top 40 hit.

The song won a Grammy Award for Best R&B Song. Withers included the edited version on the 1981 compilation Bill Withers' Greatest Hits and many subsequent greatest hits collections.

== Charts ==
=== Weekly charts ===
Chart (1981)	Peak position
Australia (KMR)	31
Belgium (Ultratop 50 Flanders)	16
Canada Top Singles (RPM)	10
Canada Adult Contemporary (RPM)	5
Ireland (IRMA)	25
Netherlands (Dutch Top 40)	11
Netherlands (Single Top 100)	16
New Zealand (Recorded Music NZ)	24
UK Singles (Official Charts)	34
US Billboard Hot 100	2
US Adult Contemporary (Billboard)	2
US Hot R&B/Hip-Hop Songs (Billboard)	3
US Cash Box Top 100	4

Chart (2020)	Peak position
France (SNEP)	150
Sweden Heatseeker (Sverigetopplistan)	4

=== Year-end charts ===
Chart (1981)	Position
Canada Top Singles (RPM)	78
Netherlands (Dutch Top 40)	81
US Billboard Hot 100	18
US Adult Contemporary (Billboard)	18

== Certifications ==
Region	Certification	Certified units/sales
Denmark (IFPI Danmark)	Platinum	90,000^{‡}
Germany (BVMI)	Gold	300,000^{‡}
Italy (FIMI)	Gold	35,000^{‡}
New Zealand (RMNZ)	3× Platinum	90,000^{‡}
Spain (Promusicae)	Gold	30,000^{‡}
United Kingdom (BPI)	Platinum	600,000^{‡}
^{‡} Sales+streaming figures based on certification alone.

== Toshinobu Kubota version ==
"Just the Two of Us"

Single by Toshi Kubota featuring Caron Wheeler

from the album Kubojah: Parallel World I and Sunshine, Moonlight
- Released: June 25, 1996
- Recorded: 1991; 1995 (re-recorded)
- Genre: Reggae (Kubojah version); R&B; soul (Sunshine, Moonlight version)
- Length: 4:28 (album version); 3:33 (single version)
- Label: Sony Japan
- Songwriters: Bill Withers; Ralph MacDonald; William Salter
- Producers: Toshinobu Kubota; Ralph MacDonald; William Salter; Bill Withers

Toshinobu Kubota singles chronology
"La La La Love Song" (1996)	"Just the Two of Us" (1996)	"Body-Cation" (1996)

Caron Wheeler singles chronology
"Keep on Movin' (remix)" (1996)	"Just the Two of Us" (1996)	"Star" (1999)

Music video
- "Just the Two of Us" on YouTube

"Just the Two of Us" was covered by Japanese singer Toshinobu Kubota as a duet with Caron Wheeler in 1991, for his album Kubojah: Parallel World I. The song was listed as "Just the 2 of Us", featuring a reggae-style beat. In 1995, Kubota re-recorded the song with a more R&B-style beat for his album Sunshine, Moonlight. In 1996, he released the song as the second single from the album. The song charted at number 30 on the Oricon Weekly Singles chart and remained on the charts for five weeks.

=== Music video ===
In 1996, Kubota and Wheeler shot a music video for the song. The video is set at night, at a party in Kubota's apartment. Wheeler watches the party from the fire escape of the next apartment building. The single version was used for the audio format of the video. There are also shots of other musicians playing their instruments during the party, a group of elderly men playing cards outside the apartment on the sidewalk, and a couple dancing in another room of the apartment.

=== Formats and track listing ===
- CD single
1. "Just the Two of Us" (Butcher Bros. LP remix) (duet with Caron Wheeler)
- Maxi single
1. "Just the Two of Us" (Butcher Bros. LP remix)
2. "Just the Two of Us" (Smooth R&B mix)
3. "Just the Two of Us" (So So Def remix)
4. "Just the Two of Us" (club mix radio edit)
5. "Just the Two of Us" (Street mix) (featuring Fat Man Scoop and E. Bros.)

== Other cover versions ==
- Ralph MacDonald was credited as writer/producer of a Bill Cosby parody, "Just the Slew of Us", the theme of the movie Bill Cosby: Himself (1983).
- In 1992, the New York City R&B vocal trio Around the Way sampled the song in "Really Into You". They reached No. 89 on the U.S. Billboard Hot 100.
- Will Smith recorded a rap song of the same name for his 1997 album Big Willie Style, using elements from Grover Washington Jr.’s song. As such, Withers, Salter, and MacDonald are credited as co-writers with Smith.
- Theory of a Deadman did a parody version of the song entitled "Two Of Us (Stuck)" for their 2023 album, Dinosaur.
- Keith Urban recorded the song for his 2026 album, Flow State.

== Appearances in media ==
=== Advertisement ===
The title was popularized in France to be the main music for advertising campaigns for Caprice des Dieux cheese since 2009.

=== TikTok ===
In late 2020, "Just the Two of Us" started trending on TikTok, which prompted Salter's granddaughter, Jada Salter, to upload a video to the platform commemorating his work.
