= 'Bout Love =

Studio album by Bill Withers
- Released: March 12, 1979
- Recorded: August–December 1978
- Studio: Record Plant (Los Angeles, California) and A&R Recording (New York City, New York).
- Genre: Soul
- Length: 39:03
- Label: Columbia
- Producer: Paul Smith

Bill Withers chronology
Menagerie (1977)	'Bout Love (1979)	Bill Withers' Greatest Hits (1981)

'Bout Love is the seventh studio album by the American musician Bill Withers, released in 1979 on the Columbia label. Withers collaborated with Paul Smith, who co-wrote all the tracks but "Memories Are That Way" with Withers.

== Reception ==
Professional ratings
Review scores
Source	Rating
AllMusic	2/5 stars
Christgau's Record Guide	C
The Virgin Encyclopedia of R&B and Soul	3/5 stars

'Bout Love features Withers' usual mellowness and introspective lyrics, however its lead single, "Don't It Make It Better" is up-tempo, and its follow-up single, "You Got the Stuff" is a funk song. "Don't It Make It Better" peaked at No. 30 on Billboard R&B Singles, but "You Got the Stuff" reached only No. 85 on the chart.

'Bout Love peaked at No. 50 on the R&B chart and No. 134 on the Billboard 200.

== Track listing ==
1. "All Because of You" (Bill Withers, Paul Smith) – 3:50
2. "Dedicated to You My Love" (Withers, Smith) – 4:47
3. "Don't It Make It Better" (Withers, Smith) – 4:12
4. "You Got the Stuff" (Withers, Smith, Keith Hatchell) – 7:14
5. "Look to Each Other for Love" (Withers, Smith) – 4:23
6. "Love" (Withers, Smith) – 4:57
7. "Love Is" (Withers, Smith) – 4:21
8. "Memories Are That Way" (Withers) – 5:06

== Personnel ==
- Bill Withers – vocals, acoustic guitar (1), bass (1), whistle (2), guitar (3, 4, 7, 8), horn and string arrangements (3), acoustic piano (4), drums (8)
- Wah Wah Watson – electric guitar (1)
- Paul Smith – keyboards (1–7), synthesizer (1–4)
- Geoffrey Leib – keyboards (8)
- Clifford Coulter – synthesizer (8)
- Keni Burke – additional bass lIcks (1, 2), bass (3, 6, 7)
- Bryan Garofalo – bass (2, 5, 8)
- Jerry Knight – bass (3)
- Keith Hatchell – bass (4)
- Russ Kunkel – drums (1, 2, 3, 5–8), additional cymbal (8)
- Harvey Mason – drums (4)
- Ralph MacDonald – percussion (1, 5–8)
- Buddy Collette – flute solo (2)
- Bill Eaton – horn and string arrangements (1, 8), additional string arrangements (5, 6)
- Jeff Ervin – additional horn arrangements (1, 3)
- Jean Hintermann – additional horn arrangements (1, 3)
- Wade Marcus – horn arrangements (4–7), string arrangements (5, 6, 7)

Production

- Paul Smith – producer
- Bill Eaton – production consultant
- Gerry Griffith – production consultant
- Ralph MacDonald – production consultant
- Wade Marcus – production consultant
- Bob Merritt – recording, mixing
- Phil Jantaas – assistant engineer
- Ollie Cotton – assistant engineer
- Ed Rakowicz – assistant engineer
- Andy Engel – design
- Fred Anderson – photography

== Charts ==
Chart (1979)	Peak position
Billboard Pop Albums	134
Billboard Top Soul Albums	50

=== Singles ===
Year	Single	Chart positions
Year	Single	US R&B
1979	"Don't It Make It Better "	30
1979	"You Got The Stuff "	85
