= Just as I Am (Bill Withers album) =

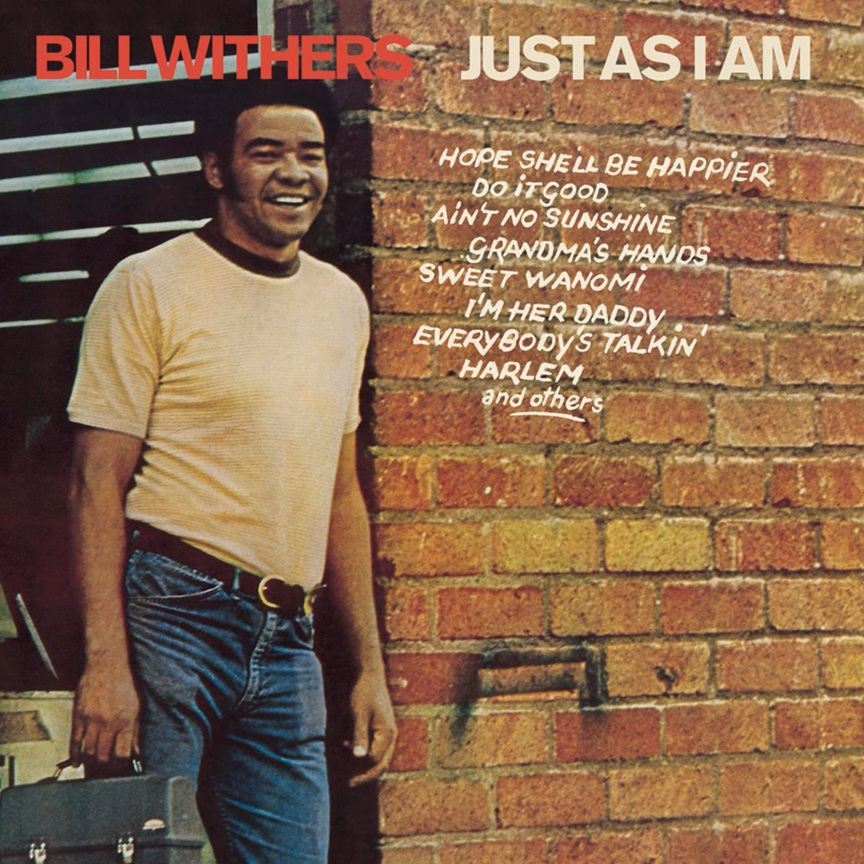

Studio album by Bill Withers
- Released: May 1, 1971
- Recorded: 1971
- Studios: Sunset Sound (Hollywood); Wally Heider's Studio 3 (Hollywood)
- Genres: Soul; folk
- Length: 35:37
- Label: Sussex
- Producer: Booker T. Jones

Bill Withers chronology
Just as I Am (1971)	Still Bill (1972)

Singles from Just as I Am
- 1. "Ain't No Sunshine" Released: June 1971; 2. "Grandma's Hands" Released: 1971

Just as I Am is the debut studio album by American soul musician Bill Withers, released on May 1, 1971, by Sussex Records. The album features the hit single "Ain't No Sunshine", which was ranked at number 280 on Rolling Stone magazine's list of the 500 Greatest Songs of All Time. The album is also known for featuring the single "Grandma's Hands," which reached number 18 on the Best Selling Soul Singles chart and 42 on the Billboard Hot 100. Booker T. Jones produced, arranged, and played keyboards and guitar on Just as I Am. The album was later reissued as a dual disc with the DVD side featuring all the tracks in 5.1 Surround Sound.

In 2020, Rolling Stone ranked the album at number 304 in their list of the 500 Greatest Albums of All Time.

== Cover ==
The album sleeve features a photograph of Withers next to a brick building, supposedly the factory that he was working in at the time the album was recorded, where he installed airplane toilets. He wears a yellow T-shirt and jeans and holds a lunchbox. It was taken by Norbert Jobst.

== Critical reception ==
Professional ratings
Review scores
Source	Rating
All About Jazz	(favorable)
AllMusic	5/5 stars
Christgau's Record Guide	A−
Entertainment Weekly	A−
PopMatters	8/10 stars
Uncut	5/5 stars
Uptown	A

Reviewing in Christgau's Record Guide: Rock Albums of the Seventies (1981), Robert Christgau wrote:

With faultless production from Booker T.—even the strings are taut—this is an unusually likable and listenable middlebrow soul LP. As befits a strummer of acoustic guitars, Withers is more folk than pop, and when he adds folk seriousness to a gospel fervor surprising in such an apparently even-tempered man, he makes titles like 'I'm Her Daddy' and 'Better Off Dead' take on overtones of radical protest where other singers would descend into bathos. I don't find that even standout cuts like 'Ain't No Sunshine' and 'Grandma's Hands' reach out and grab me, but except for a letdown toward the end of side two the flow sustains.

== Track listing ==
All tracks are written by Bill Withers; except where indicated.

Side A
No.	Title	Writer(s)	Length
1.	"Harlem"		3:23
2.	"Ain't No Sunshine"		2:04
3.	"Grandma's Hands"		2:00
4.	"Sweet Wanomi"		2:34
5.	"Everybody's Talkin'"	Fred Neil	3:26
6.	"Do It Good"		2:53

Side B
No.	Title	Writer(s)	Length
1.	"Hope She'll Be Happier"		3:49
2.	"Let It Be"	John Lennon, Paul McCartney	2:35
3.	"I'm Her Daddy"		3:17
4.	"In My Heart"		4:20
5.	"Moanin' and Groanin'"		2:59
6.	"Better Off Dead"		2:16

2005 bonus tracks
No.	Title	Length
1.	"Ain't No Sunshine (Live from The Old Grey Whistle Test, 1972)"
2.	"I'm Her Daddy (Live from Soul!, 1971)"
3.	"Harlem (Live from Soul!, 1971)"

== Chart history ==
Chart (1971)	Peak position
U.S. Billboard Black Albums	5
U.S. Billboard Pop Albums	39
Canadian RPM 100 Albums	37

== Certifications ==
Region	Certification	Certified units/sales
Denmark (IFPI Danmark)	Gold	10,000^{‡}
^{‡} Sales+streaming figures based on certification alone.

== Personnel ==
- Bill Withers – vocals, guitar
- Stephen Stills – guitar
- Booker T. Jones – guitar, keyboards, arrangements
- Donald Dunn, Chris Ethridge – bass guitar
- Al Jackson Jr., Jim Keltner – drums
- Bobbye Hall – percussion

=== Production ===
- Booker T. Jones – producer
- Bill Halverson – engineer
- Bill Lazerus – engineer
- Jim Golden – remixing
- Sam Feldman – mastering at Bell Sound Studios (New York City, New York).
- Norbert Jobst – design, photography
- Bill Withers – sleeve notes
