= Use Me (Bill Withers song) =

1972 single by Bill Withers

- Side A of the US single

Single by Bill Withers

from the album Still Bill
- B-side: "Let Me in Your Life"
- Released: August 1972
- Genre: Soul; funk
- Length: 3:45
- Label: Sussex Records
- Songwriter: Bill Withers

Bill Withers singles chronology
"Lean on Me" (1972)	"Use Me" (1972)	"Let Us Love" (1972)

Audio video
- "Use Me" on YouTube

"Use Me" is a song composed and originally recorded by Bill Withers. It was included on his 1972 album Still Bill and was released as a single. An eight-minute live version opens the 1973 album Live at Carnegie Hall.

== Structure and content ==
The song is noted for its repeated bass figure, which is heard alongside a complex rhythm in the percussion.

Withers has said the song relates to feedback he received from women that he was "too nice", and his intent to change that:

That's fun stuff. That's just talkin' trash. That’s just a song about being a little playful, a little arrogant and a little cool. Unless you were one of those people that were born popular, I was a chronic stutterer until I was twenty-eight. I avoided the phone. So I wasn't this popular guy. I remember being young and I would have girls tell me, "You’re too nice." I didn't understand that.

What kind of twisted world are we in? Women like bad boys, I guess. There is no more confusing form of rejection than for somebody to tell you that you’re not interesting to them because you’re too nice.

So over the course of time, you say okay, you wanna play, okay, let's play? Use Me taps into that. I tried to be nice, now let's get nasty. That song came quick. I was working in McDonnell Douglas out in Long Beach and the noise of the factory, they had some women working there. I crossed that line there thinking, “You all want a nasty boy? Well here I come.” [laughs].

== Reception ==
It was Withers' second-biggest hit in the United States, released in September 1972 and later reaching No. 2 on the Billboard Hot 100 chart. It was kept from No. 1 by both "Ben" by Michael Jackson and "My Ding-a-Ling" by Chuck Berry. "Use Me" also peaked at No. 2 on the soul chart for two weeks. Withers performed it on Soul Train on November 4, 1972. Billboard ranked "Use Me" as the No. 78 song for 1972. The song was certified Gold by the RIAA.

Music critic Robert Christgau called "Use Me" "one of the few knowledgeable songs about sex our supposedly sexy music has ever produced", featuring a "cross-class attraction" in its narrative.

== Personnel ==
- Bill Withers – lead vocals and acoustic guitar
- Ray Jackson – clavinet
- Melvin Dunlap – bass guitar
- James Gadson – drums and percussion

== Charts ==
=== Weekly charts ===
Chart (1972)	Peak position
U.S. Billboard Hot 100	2
U.S. Billboard Easy Listening	14
U.S. Billboard Hot Soul Singles	2
U.S. Cash Box Top 100	5
Canada RPM Hot Singles	33

=== Year-end charts ===
Chart (1972)	Rank
US Cash Box	100

== Certifications ==
Region	Certification	Certified units/sales
United Kingdom (BPI)	Silver	200,000^{‡}
^{‡} Sales+streaming figures based on certification alone.

== Other recordings ==
A variety of artists have covered the song, including:

- Fiona Apple
- Patricia Barber
- Beans and Fatback
- Better Than Ezra
- Rick Braun from "Kisses in the Rain" (2001)
- D'Angelo
- Holly Golightly
- Gwar
- Ben Harper
- Isaac Hayes
- Vincent Herring, on the album Hard Times
- Hootie & the Blowfish, on their 2000 compilation album Scattered, Smothered and Covered
- The House Jacks, a cappella, on their 2007 live album Get Down Mr. President
- Ike & Tina Turner, on their 1998 album Absolutely the Best
- Mick Jagger featuring Lenny Kravitz and Flea on his third album Wandering Spirit (1993)
- Eran James
- Al Jarreau
- Grace Jones, on her 1981 album Nightclubbing
- Kimiko Kasai
- As a duet, Alicia Keys and Rob Thomas
- The Lachy Doley Group
- Kendrick Lamar sampled the recurring drum break for his 2012 song "Sing About Me, I'm Dying of Thirst" from the album Good Kid, M.A.A.D City
- Lindsay Mac
- Liza Minnelli, on her 1973 album The Singer
- Ian Moss recorded a version for his sixth studio album, Soul on West 53rd (2009).
- My Brightest Diamond
- Aaron Neville
- Nicky Moore and the Blues Corporation
- Omar
- Esther Phillips, on her 1972 album Alone Again, Naturally
- Raw Stylus
- Rockapella
- Slash's Blues Ball
- Tenth Avenue North
- UGK sampled the song for their track “Use Me Up” from their 1992 album Too Hard to Swallow.
- Scott Walker, on his 1973 album Stretch
- Walter "Wolfman" Washington
- Junior Wells
- Fred Wesley & The J.B.'s
- Jim White for the 2005 Starbucks compilation album, Sweetheart 2005: Love Songs
- Widespread Panic
- Zoobombs
- José James
