= Ralph MacDonald =

American musician (1944–2011)

Background information
- Born: Ralph Anthony MacDonald; March 15, 1944; Harlem, New York, U.S.
- Died: December 18, 2011 (aged 67) Stamford, Connecticut, U.S.
- Occupations: Composer; arranger; pannist
- Instruments: Steelpan; percussion; keyboards

Ralph Anthony MacDonald (March 15, 1944 – December 18, 2011) was an American percussionist, steelpan virtuoso, songwriter, musical arranger, and record producer.

His compositions include "Where Is the Love", a Grammy Award winner for the duet of Roberta Flack and Donny Hathaway; "Just the Two of Us", recorded by Bill Withers and Grover Washington Jr.; and "Mister Magic" recorded by Grover Washington Jr.

== Career ==
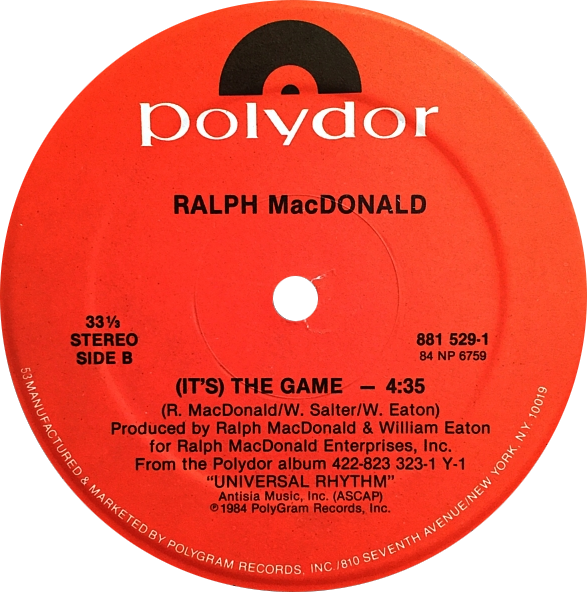
MacDonald's 1984 single "(It's) the Game" appeared on his album Universal Rhythm.

Growing up in Harlem, New York, United States, under the close mentorship of his Trinbagonian father, Patrick MacDonald (a calypsonian and bandleader originally from Trinidad and Tobago who used the stage name "Macbeth the Great"), MacDonald began showing his musical talent, particularly with the steelpan, and when he was 17 years old started playing pan for the Harry Belafonte show.

He remained with the Belafonte band for a decade before deciding to strike out on his own. In 1967, together with Bill Eaton and William Salter, he formed Antisia Music Incorporated. Antisia is based in Stamford, Connecticut.

In 1971, Roberta Flack recorded "Where Is the Love", which MacDonald and Salter had written. The duet with Donny Hathaway won a Grammy Award for Best Pop Performance by a Duo or Group with Vocal. The single was awarded gold status and sold more than one million copies. MacDonald played on the session for the song.

He performed on Herbie Mann's album Discothèque in 1975. One of MacDonald's best-known co-compositions is "Just the Two of Us", a single sung by Bill Withers, with saxophone performance by Grover Washington, Jr. It reached number two on the Billboard Hot 100, and has since been covered and sampled by many artists, including Will Smith.

== Later life ==
MacDonald regularly travelled back to Trinidad and Tobago, where he renewed his work in the steelpan, particularly on the hills of Laventille, Trinidad, with the multiple Steelband Panorama champions Desperadoes Steel Orchestra, whose shows he attended and with whom he played whenever he got the opportunity, "beating iron" in "The Engine Room" (as a steelband's rhythm section is often called). Calypso and the steelpan were Ralph MacDonald's roots. He recorded a song called "You Need More Calypso", written by William Eaton to articulate how he felt the music world could more benefit by the genre his homeland had given to the world.

On December 18, 2011, MacDonald died of lung cancer. His wife, Grace, and four children Jovonni, Anthony, Atiba, and Nefra-Ann survive him. MacDonald was cremated, with his ashes buried at the Woodlawn Cemetery in the Bronx, New York.

== Discography ==
His recording collaborations number in the hundreds and include Burt Bacharach, George Benson, David Bowie, Aretha Franklin, Art Garfunkel, Billy Joel, Quincy Jones, Carole King, Miriam Makeba, David Sanborn, Paul Simon, Steely Dan, James Taylor, Luther Vandross, Amy Winehouse, Bob James, Ashford and Simpson, Nana Mouskouri, The Average White Band, Hall & Oates, The Brothers Johnson, and he spent years as a charter member of Jimmy Buffett's Coral Reefer Band.

He is also featured on percussion on George Benson's 1976 album, Breezin'; on percussion on Carole King's 1975 album, Thoroughbred, and on Looking Glass's 1973 album Subway Serenade.

His song "Jam on the Groove" was featured on the breakbeat compilation Ultimate Breaks and Beats. His "Calypso Breakdown" is on the Saturday Night Fever soundtrack. He provided the percussion to "Mister Magic" recorded by saxophonist Grover Washington, Jr.

MacDonald also appears on Amy Lee's CD Use Me.

=== As leader ===
- Sound of a Drum (Marlin, 1976)
- The Path (Marlin, 1978)
- Counterpoint (Marlin, 1979)
- Universal Rhythm (Polydor, 1984)
- Surprize (Polydor, 1985)
- Reunion (Videoarts Music, 1995)
- Port Pleasure (1998)
- Trippin' (2000)
- Home Grown (2003)
- Just the Two of Us (2004)
- Mixty Motions (2008)

=== As sideman ===
With Peter Allen

- Tenterfield Saddler (Metromedia, 1972)
- Continental American (A&M, 1974)

With Average White Band

- AWB (Atlantic, 1974)

With Patti Austin

- End of a Rainbow (CTI, 1976)
- Havana Candy (CTI, 1977)
- Every Home Should Have One (Qwest, 1981)
- In My Life (CTI Records, 1983)
- Gettin' Away with Murder (Qwest, 1985)

With Ashford & Simpson

- Gimme Something Real (Warner Bros., 1973)
- I Wanna Be Selfish (Warner Bros., 1974)
- Come As You Are (Warner Bros., 1976)
- Send It (Warner Bros., 1977)
- So So Satisfied (Warner Bros., 1977)
- Is It Still Good to Ya (Warner Bros., 1978)
- Stay Free (Warner Bros., 1979)
- A Musical Affair (Warner Bros., 1980)
- High-Rise (Capitol, 1983)
- Solid (Capitol, 1984)

With Gato Barbieri

- Caliente (A&M Records, 1976, 1986, CD 3247)

With Bee Gees

- Living Eyes (RSO, 1981)
- Still Waters (Polydor, 1997)

With George Benson

- Breezin' (Warner Bros., 1976)
- In Flight (Warner Bros., 1977)
- Livin' Inside Your Love (Warner Bros., 1979)
- 20/20 (Warner Bros., 1985)
- Big Boss Band (Warner Bros., 1990)
- That's Right (GRP, 1996)

With Blood, Sweat & Tears

- Mirror Image (Columbia, 1974)

With David Bowie

- Young Americans (RCA Records, 1975)

With The Brecker Brothers

- The Brecker Bros. (Arista, 1975)

With Martin Briley

- Dangerous Moments (Mercury Records, 1984)

With The Brothers Johnson

- Look Out for #1 (A&M Records, 1976)
- Right on Time (A&M Records, 1977)

With James Brown

- Hell (Polydor, 1974)

With Jimmy Buffett

- Floridays (MCA Records, 1986)
- Hot Water (MCA Records, 1988)
- Beach House on the Moon (Island Records, 1999)
- Take the Weather With You (RCA Records, 2006, 88697-00332-2)

With Kenny Burrell and Grover Washington Jr.

- Togethering (Blue Note, 1984)

With Jonathan Butler

- Jonathan Butler (Jive, 1987)

With Ron Carter

- Blues Farm (CTI, 1973)
- Spanish Blue (CTI, 1974)
- Anything Goes (Kudu, 1975)
- A Song for You (Milestone, 1978)
- New York Slick (Milestone, 1979)
- Empire Jazz (RSO, 1980)
- Pick 'Em (Milestone, 1980)

With The Carpenters

- Lovelines (A&M, 1989)

With Merry Clayton

- Keep Your Eye on the Sparrow (Ode, 1975)

With Judy Collins

- Judith (Elektra, 1975)

With Randy Crawford

- Everything Must Change (Warner Bros., 1976)

With Lou Courtney

- I'm In Need of Love (Epic, 1974)

With Jackie DeShannon

- Your Baby Is a Lady (Atlantic, 1974)

With Paul Desmond

- Skylark (CTI, 1973)

With Yvonne Elliman

- Yvonne Elliman (Decca, 1972)

With Little Feat

- Join the Band (429 Records, 2008)

With Roberta Flack

- Quiet Fire (Atlantic, 1971)
- Killing Me Softly (Atlantic, 1973)
- Feel Like Makin' Love (Atlantic, 1975)
- I'm the One (Atlantic, 1982)

With Roberta Flack and Donny Hathaway

- Roberta Flack & Donny Hathaway (Atlantic, 1972)

With Aretha Franklin

- Let Me in Your Life (Atlantic, 1974)
- With Everything I Feel in Me (Atlantic, 1974)

With Michael Franks

- Burchfield Nines (Warner Bros., 1978)
- The Camera Never Lies (Warner Bros., 1987)

With Glenn Frey

- Soul Searchin' (MCA Records, 1988)

With Art Garfunkel

- Breakaway (Columbia Records, 1975)
- Watermark (Columbia Records, 1977)

With Barry Goldberg

- Barry Goldberg (Atco Records, 1974)

With Lesley Gore

- Love Me By Name (A&M, 1976)

With Hall & Oates

- Abandoned Luncheonette (Atlantic, 1973)

With John Hall

- Recovered (Siren, 1998)

With Tim Hardin

- Bird on a Wire (Columbia, 1971)

With Donny Hathaway

- Extension of a Man (Atco, 1973)

With Lena Horne

- Lena & Michel (RCA Victor, 1975)

With Bob James

- One (CTI, 1974)
- Two (CTI, 1975)
- Three (CTI, 1976)
- BJ4 (CTI, 1977)
- Heads (CTI, 1977)
- Touchdown (Tappan Zee Records, 1978)
- Lucky Seven (Tappan Zee Records, 1979)

With Bob James and Earl Klugh

- One on One (Tappan Zee Records, 1979)

With Milt Jackson

- Sunflower (CTI, 1972)

With Al Jarreau

- Glow (Reprise, 1976)

With Garland Jeffreys

- Garland Jeffreys (Atlantic, 1973)
- One-Eyed Jack (A&M, 1978)

With Billy Joel

- The Stranger (Columbia, 1977)
- 52nd Street (Columbia, 1978)
- An Innocent Man (Columbia, 1983)

With Dr. John

- In the Right Place (Atco, 1973)

With Margie Joseph

- Margie Joseph (Atlantic, 1973)
- Sweet Surrender (Atlantic, 1974)
- Margie (Atlantic, 1975)

With Eric Kaz

- If You're Lonely (Atlantic Records, 1972)

With Carole King

- Thoroughbred (A&M Records, 1976)

With Morgana King

- New Beginnings (Paramount Records, 1973)

With Hubert Laws

- Morning Star (CTI, 1972)
- The Chicago Theme (CTI, 1974)

With Donal Leace

- Donal Leace (Atlantic Records, 1972)

With Julian Lennon

- Valotte (Atlantic Records, 1984)

With O'Donel Levy

- Everything I Do Gonna Be Funky (Groove Merchant, 1974)

With Kenny Loggins

- Celebrate Me Home (Columbia Records, 1977)

With Jon Lucien

- Mind's Eye (RCA, 1974)
- Premonition (Columbia, 1976)

With Elliot Lurie

- Elliot Lurie (Epic Records, 1975)

With Taj Mahal

- Taj (Gramavision, 1987)

With Junior Mance

- That Lovin' Feelin' (Milestone, 1972)

With Herbie Mann

- Discotheque (Atlantic, 1975)
- Brazil Once Again (Atlantic, 1978)

With Arif Mardin

- Journey (Atlantic, 1974)

With Esther Marrow

- Sister Woman (Fantasy, 1972)

With Mac McAnally

- Semi-True Stories (Mailboat Records, 2004)

With Gene McDaniels

- Natural Juices (Ode, 1975)

With Don McLean

- Playin' Favorites (United Artists Records, 1973)
- Homeless Brother (United Artists Records, 1974)

With Bette Midler

- The Divine Miss M (Atlantic Records, 1972)
- Bette Midler (Atlantic Records, 1973)

With Melba Moore

- Peach Melba (Buddah Records, 1975)

With The Neville Brothers

- Fiyo on the Bayou (A&M, 1981)

With David "Fathead" Newman

- Mr. Fathead (Warner Bros., 1976)

With Laura Nyro

- Christmas and the Beads of Sweat (Columbia Records, 1970)

With Teddy Pendergrass

- TP (Philadelphia, 1980)
- This One's for You (Philadelphia, 1982)

With Esther Phillips

- Alone Again, Naturally (Kudu, 1972)
- Performance (Kudu, 1974)
- Capricorn Princess (Kudu, 1976)
- What a Diff'rence a Day Makes (Kudu, 1976)
- For All We Know (Kudu, 1976)

With John Prine

- Sweet Revenge (Atlantic Records, 1973)

With Bernard Purdie

- Soul Is... Pretty Purdie (Flying Dutchman, 1972)

With Bonnie Raitt

- Streetlights (Warner Bros. Records, 1974)

With The Rascals

- Peaceful World (Columbia Records, 1971)

With Lou Rawls

- It's Supposed to Be Fun (Blue Note, 1990)

With Leon Redbone

- On the Track (Warner Bros., 1975)

With Martha Reeves

- Martha Reeves (MCA Records, 1974)

With Lionel Richie

- Tuskegee (Mercury Records, 2012)

With The Ritchie Family

- African Queens (Marlin, 1977)

With Max Roach

- Lift Every Voice and Sing (Atlantic, 1971)

With Diana Ross

- Why Do Fools Fall in Love (RCA Records, 1981)

With David Ruffin

- Everything's Coming Up Love (Motown, 1976)

With David Sanborn

- Taking Off (Warner Bros., 1975)
- Heart to Heart (Warner Bros., 1978)
- Hideaway (Warner Bros., 1979)
- Voyeur (Warner Bros., 1980)

With Shirley Scott

- Something (Atlantic, 1970)

With Don Sebesky

- Giant Box (CTI, 1973)

With Janis Siegel

- Experiment in White (Atlantic Records, 1982)

With Carly Simon

- Hotcakes (Elektra, 1974)

With Lucy Simon

- Lucy Simon (RCA Victor, 1975)

With Paul Simon

- Still Crazy After All These Years (Columbia Records, 1975)
- Graceland (Warner Bros. Records, 1986)

With Frank Sinatra

- L.A. Is My Lady (Qwest, 1984)

With Phoebe Snow

- Phoebe Snow (Shelter, 1974)
- It Looks Like Snow (Columbia, 1976)
- Second Childhood (Columbia Records, 1976)
- Never Letting Go (Columbia Records, 1977)
- Against the Grain (Columbia Records, 1978)

With Splinter

- Harder to Live (Dark Horse, 1975)

With Starland Vocal Band

- Starland Vocal Band (Windsong, 1976)

With Steely Dan

- Gaucho (MCA, 1980)

With Gábor Szabó

- Mizrab (CTI, 1972)
- Macho (Salvation, 1975)

With Howard Tate

- Howard Tate (Atlantic, 1972)

With James Taylor

- Walking Man (Warner Bros., 1974)

With Kate Taylor

- Kate Taylor (Columbia, 1978)

With The Manhattan Transfer

- Coming Out (Atlantic, 1976)

With Kenny Vance

- Vance 32 (Atlantic, 1975)

With Grover Washington Jr.

- All the King's Horses (Kudu, 1972)
- Soul Box (Kudu, 1973)
- Mister Magic (Kudu, 1975)
- A Secret Place (Kudu, 1976)
- Skylarkin' (Motown, 1980)
- Winelight (Elektra, 1980)
- Come Morning (Elektra, 1981)
- Inside Moves (Elektra, 1984)

With Mary Lou Williams

- Mary Lou's Mass (Mary Records, 1975)

With Cris Williamson

- Cris Williamson (Ampex Records, 1971)

With Bill Withers

- Making Music (Columbia, 1975)
- Menagerie (Columbia, 1977)
- 'Bout Love (Columbia, 1978)
- Watching You, Watching Me (Columbia, 1985)

With Zulema

- Zulema (Sussex, 1972)
