= Grandma's Hands =

1971 single by Bill Withers

- German release picture sleeve

Single by Bill Withers

from the album Just as I Am
- B-side: "Sweet Wanomi"
- Released: 1971
- Genre: Soul
- Length: 2:00
- Label: Sussex
- Songwriter: Bill Withers
- Producer: Booker T. Jones

Bill Withers singles chronology
"Ain't No Sunshine" (1971)	"Grandma's Hands" (1971)	"Lean on Me" (1972)

Audio video
- "Grandma's Hands" on YouTube

"Grandma's Hands" is a song written by Bill Withers about his grandmother. It was included on his first album Just as I Am (1971), and was released as a single, reaching number 18 on the Best Selling Soul Singles chart and 42 on the Billboard Hot 100. In Canada, it reached No. 37 on the RPM magazine charts. The song was produced by Booker T. Jones and also featured drummer Al Jackson Jr. and bassist Donald "Duck" Dunn from Booker T. & the M.G.'s, as well as Stephen Stills on electric guitar. "Grandma's Hands" was recently re-imagined in picture book form, published by Bill Withers' wife Marcia, daughter Kori, and Freedom Three Publishing.

== Lyrics ==
Withers' maternal grandfather, Gracchus Monroe Galloway (1855–1937), had been born into slavery. As a child, Withers attended church with his maternal grandmother, Lula (1868–1953). He later said: "It was spontaneous singing, there was nothing programmed. People got up and sang and everybody would join in. It was my favorite kind of singing."

A theme of the song is the caring force of Grandma's hands, as expressed in the last verse:

"Grandma's hands used to hand me piece of candy.
Grandma's hands picked me up each time I fell.
Grandma's hands, boy they really came in handy
She'd say, "Mattie don't you whip that boy.
What you want to spank him for?
He didn't drop no apple core,"
But I don't have Grandma anymore,
If I get to heaven I'll look for
Grandma's hands.
Um, mm, mm."
