= Bill Withers =

American musician (1938–2020)

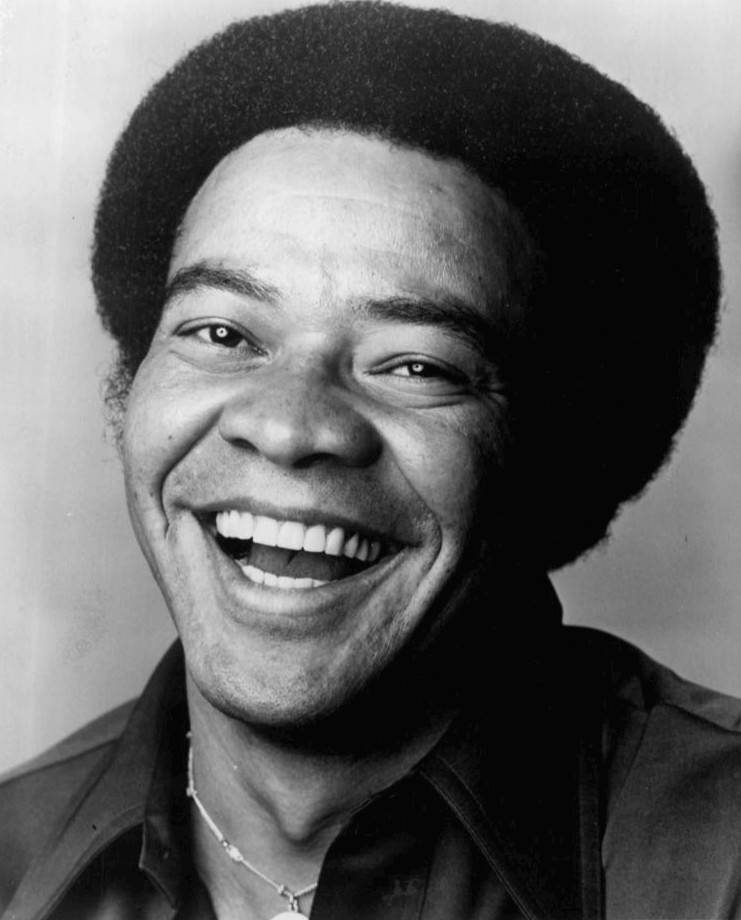
- Withers in 1976

Background information
- Born: William Harrison Withers Jr. July 4, 1938; Slab Fork, West Virginia, U.S.
- Died: March 30, 2020 (aged 81) Los Angeles, California, U.S.
- Genres: R&B; soul
- Occupations: Singer; songwriter; musician; record producer
- Instruments: Vocals; guitar; keyboards
- Years active: 1967–1985
- Labels: Sussex; Columbia
- Website: billwithers.com

William Harrison Withers Jr. (July 4, 1938 – March 30, 2020) was an American soul and R&B singer and songwriter. Born in Slab Fork, West Virginia, and raised in Beckley, West Virginia, he is known for having several hits over a career spanning 18 years, including "Ain't No Sunshine" (1971), "Grandma's Hands" (1971), "Use Me" (1972), "Lean on Me" (1972), "Lovely Day" (1977) and "Just the Two of Us" (1980) (recorded in collaboration with Grover Washington Jr.). Withers won three Grammy Awards out of nine total nominations. He largely stopped performing and recording in the mid-1980s, citing burnout and conflicts with record company executives.

His life was the subject of the 2009 documentary film Still Bill. Withers was inducted into the Songwriters Hall of Fame in 2005, the Rock and Roll Hall of Fame in 2015, and the National Rhythm and Blues Hall of Fame in 2025. Two of his songs, "Ain't No Sunshine" and "Lean on Me", were inducted into the Grammy Hall of Fame.

== Early life, family and education ==
William Harrison Withers Jr., the youngest of six children, was born in the small coal mining town of Slab Fork, West Virginia, on July 4, 1938. He was the son of Mattie (née Galloway), a maid, and William Withers, a miner. Withers developed a stutter as a child and later said that he had a hard time fitting in. Withers' parents divorced when he was three, and he was raised by his mother's family in nearby Beckley, West Virginia. Withers was 13 years old when his father died in 1951.

== Career ==
Withers enlisted in the United States Navy at age 17 and served for nine years, during which time he became interested in singing and writing songs. Withers left the Navy in 1965 and relocated to Los Angeles two years later to start a music career. His debut release was "Three Nights and a Morning" in 1967. Arranged by Mort Garson, the song went unnoticed at the time but was later reworked by Withers as the track "Harlem."

Withers worked as a mechanical assembler for several different companies, including Douglas Aircraft Corporation, IBM and Ford, while recording demo tapes with his own money, shopping them around, and performing in clubs at night. When he hit with the song "Ain't No Sunshine" in 1971, Withers refused to resign from his job because he believed that the music business was a fickle industry. Withers continued to work on his musicianship, learning guitar.

=== Sussex Records ===
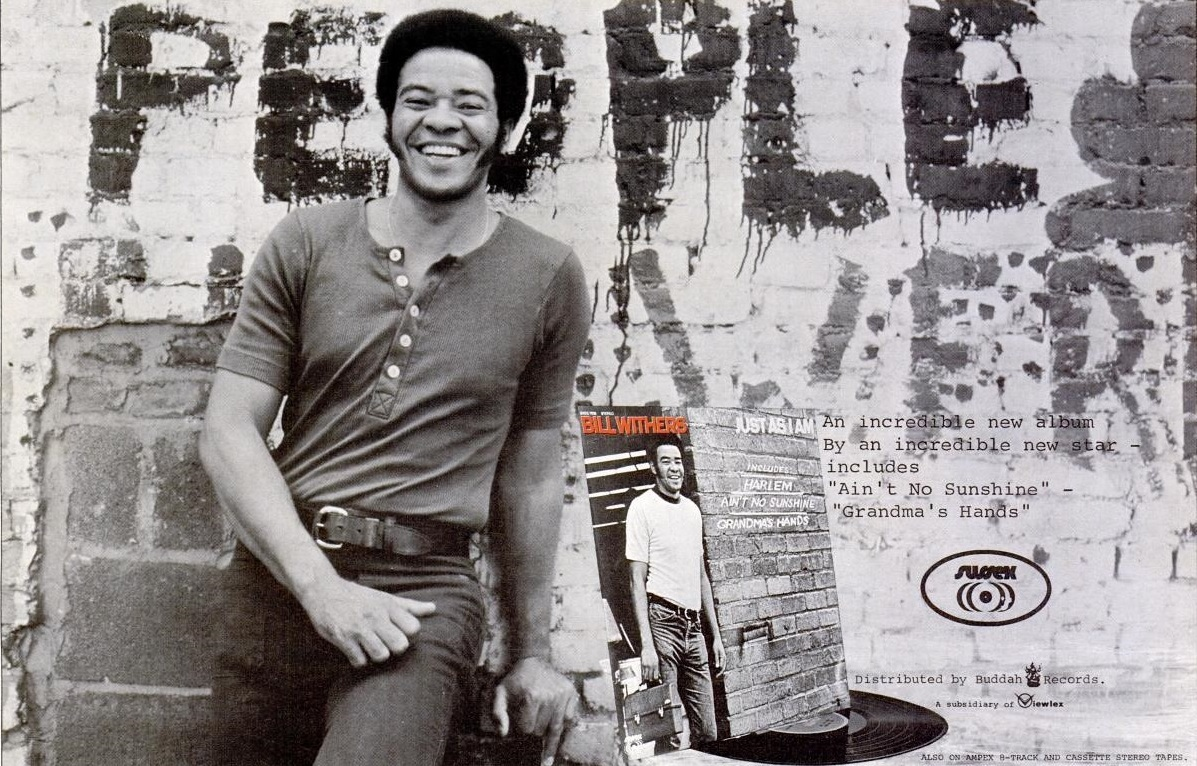
Withers in a 1971 ad for Just as I Am

In early 1970, Withers' demo tape was auditioned favorably by Clarence Avant, owner of Sussex Records. Avant signed Withers to a record deal and assigned former Stax Records stalwart Booker T. Jones to produce Withers's first album. Four three-hour recording sessions were planned for the album, but funding caused the album to be recorded in three sessions with a six-month break between the second and final sessions. Just as I Am was released in 1971 with the tracks, "Ain't No Sunshine" and "Grandma's Hands" as singles. The album features Stephen Stills playing lead guitar. On the cover of the album, Withers is pictured at his job at Weber Aircraft in Burbank, California, holding his lunch box. In October 1971, Withers received two letters on the same day. The first was from his former employer Weber Aircraft, which had laid him off a few months earlier. It offered Withers his mechanic's job, which paid $3.50 an hour. The second letter was from Johnny Carson's The Tonight Show, inviting Withers to sing "Ain't No Sunshine" on NBC.

The album was a success, and Withers began touring with a band assembled from members of the Watts 103rd Street Rhythm Band. He won a Grammy Award for Best R&B Song for "Ain't No Sunshine" at the 14th Annual Grammy Awards in 1972. The track had already sold over one million copies and was awarded a gold disc by the RIAA in September 1971.

During a hiatus from touring, Withers recorded his second album, Still Bill. The single, "Lean on Me" went to number one the week of July 8, 1972. It was Withers' second gold single with confirmed sales in excess of three million. His follow-up, "Use Me", released in August 1972, became his third million-seller, with the RIAA gold disc award taking place on October 12, 1972. His performance at Carnegie Hall on October 6, 1972, was recorded and released as the live album Bill Withers, Live at Carnegie Hall on November 30, 1972. In 1974, Withers recorded the album +'Justments.

During this time, Withers wrote and produced two songs on the Gladys Knight & the Pips album I Feel a Song, and in October 1974, he performed in concert together with James Brown, Etta James, and B.B. King in Zaire four weeks prior to the historic Rumble in the Jungle fight between George Foreman and Muhammad Ali. Footage of the performance was included in the 1996 documentary film When We Were Kings, and Withers is heard on the accompanying soundtrack. Other footage of his performance is included in the 2008 documentary film Soul Power.

Withers has said of Sussex Records: "They weren't paying me." He claims to have erased an entire album that he had recorded for the label in a fit of pique. "I could probably have handled that differently," Withers said. Due to a legal dispute with the Sussex company, he was unable to record for some time thereafter.

=== Columbia Records ===
After Sussex Records folded, Withers signed with Columbia Records in 1975. His first album release with the label, Making Music, included the single "She's Lonely," which was featured in the film Looking for Mr. Goodbar along with "She Wants to (Get on Down)". During the next three years, Withers released an album each year with Naked & Warm (1976), Menagerie (1977; containing the successful "Lovely Day"), and 'Bout Love (1979).

Because of problems with Columbia and being unable to get songs approved for his album, Withers decided to focus on joint projects from 1977 to 1985, including "Just the Two of Us," with jazz saxophonist Grover Washington Jr., which was released during February 1981. The song won the Grammy Award for Best R&B Song. Withers next released "Soul Shadows" with the Crusaders, and "In the Name of Love" with Ralph MacDonald, the latter being nominated for a Grammy for vocal performance.

In 1982, Withers was a featured vocalist on the album Dreams in Stone by French singer Michel Berger. This record included one composition co-written and sung by Withers, "Apple Pie," an upbeat disco song about New York City.

In 1985 came Watching You, Watching Me, which featured the Top 40-rated R&B single "Oh, Yeah!" and ended Withers' business association with Columbia Records. Withers stated in interviews that a lot of the songs approved for the album—in particular, two of the first three singles released—were the same songs that had been rejected in 1982, contributing significantly to the eight-year hiatus between albums. Withers also stated it was frustrating seeing his record label release an album for Mr. T, an actor, when they were preventing him, an actual songwriter, from releasing his own. Withers toured with Jennifer Holliday in 1985 to promote what would be his final studio album.

Withers' disdain for Columbia's A&R executives—or "blaxperts" as he termed them—trying to exert control over his sound to sell more albums played a part in his decision to not record or re-sign with a record label after 1985. This effectively ended his performing career, though remixes of his previously recorded music were released well after his "retirement." Withers said that his finding fame at the relatively mature age of 32 was a benefit, as he had been socialized to accept life as a regular middle-class American and did not feel pressured or obligated to continue his music career after experiencing conflicts with record company executives. After leaving the music industry, Withers said that he did not miss touring and performing live and had no regrets about leaving entertainment.

=== Post-Columbia career ===
In 1988, a new version of "Lovely Day" from the 1977 Menagerie album, entitled "Lovely Day (Sunshine Mix)" and remixed by Ben Liebrand was released. The original release had reached number 7 in the UK in early 1978, and the re-release climbed higher to number 4.

At the 30th Annual Grammy Awards in 1988, Withers won the Grammy for Best Rhythm and Blues Song as songwriter for the re-recording of "Lean on Me" by Club Nouveau. This was Withers' ninth Grammy nomination and third win. Withers contributed two songs to Jimmy Buffett's 2004 release License to Chill. Following the reissues of Still Bill on January 28, 2003, and Just As I Am on March 8, 2005, there was speculation of previously unreleased material being issued as a new album. In 2006, Sony Music gave Withers' previously unreleased tapes back to him. The following year, "Lean on Me" was inducted into the Grammy Hall of Fame.

At the 56th Annual Grammy Awards in 2014, Bill Withers: The Complete Sussex & Columbia Albums Collection, a nine-disc set featuring Withers' eight studio albums as well as his live album Live at Carnegie Hall, received the Grammy Award for Best Historical Album (sharing the award with the Rolling Stones' Charlie Is My Darling – Ireland 1965). The award was presented to Leo Sacks, who produced the collection, and the mastering engineers Mark Wilder, Joseph M. Palmaccio, and Tom Ruff.

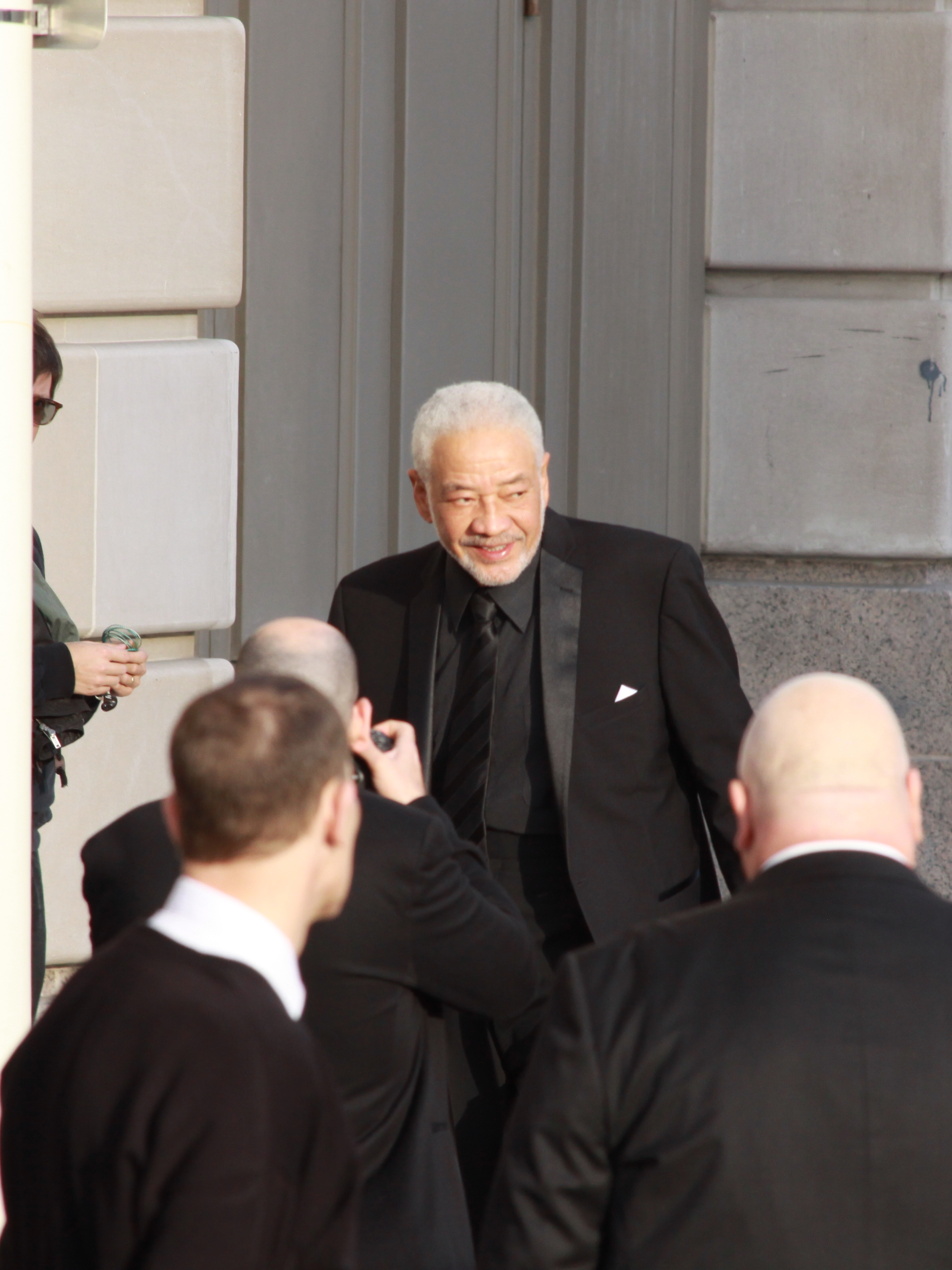
Withers at the Rock and Roll Hall of Fame in 2015

In 2005, Withers was inducted into the Songwriters Hall of Fame. In April 2015, he was inducted into the Rock and Roll Hall of Fame by Stevie Wonder. Withers described the honor as "an award of attrition" and said: "What few songs I wrote during my brief career, there ain't a genre that somebody didn't record them in. I'm not a virtuoso, but I was able to write songs that people could identify with. I don't think I've done bad for a guy from Slab Fork, West Virginia." Later that year, a tribute concert in his honor was held at Carnegie Hall featuring Aloe Blacc, Ed Sheeran, Dr. John, Michael McDonald, and Anthony Hamilton. The concert recreated Withers' 1973 concert album, Live at Carnegie Hall, along with some of his other material. Withers was in attendance and spoke briefly onstage.

In February 2017, Withers made an appearance on Joy Reid's MSNBC show to talk about the refugee crisis as well as the political climate in America.

=== Still Bill documentary ===
The 2009 documentary, Still Bill, explored Withers' reasons for quitting the music industry and painted the picture of a fulfilled musician and human being. Roger Ebert said: "[Withers] still lives and survives as a happy man. Still Bill is about a man who topped the charts, walked away from it all in 1985 and is pleased that he did."

== Legacy ==
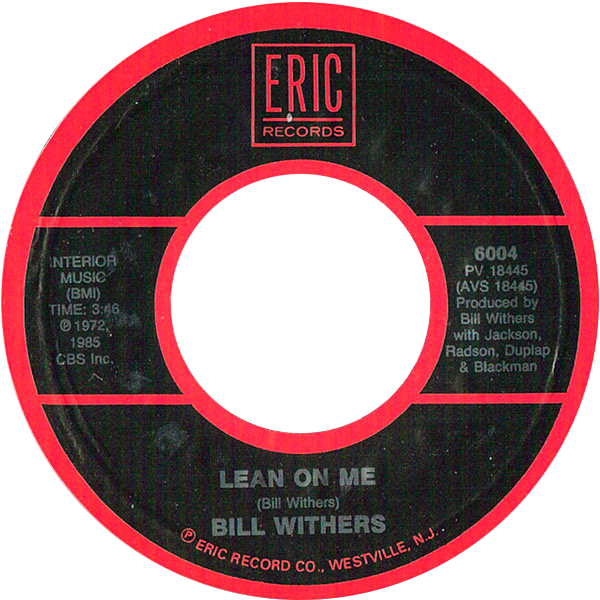
Vinyl copy of "Lean On Me" by Bill Withers

Withers is known for his "smooth" baritone vocals and "sumptuous" soul arrangements. He wrote some of the most covered songs of the 1970s, including "Lean on Me" and "Ain't No Sunshine." The former entered the Hot 100 chart through multiple versions, including Club Nouveau's 1987 cover, which made the composition one of nine songs to have led the chart via different acts. With "Lovely Day", Withers set the record for the longest sustained note on an American chart hit, holding a high E for 18 seconds.

Editors from The Guardian considered that Withers' songs are "some of the most beloved in the American songbook", citing, "'Ain't No Sunshine' is regarded as one of the all-time great breakup tracks, while 'Lean on Me' [is] an ode to the supportive power of friendship ..." For the same newspaper, Alex Petridis noticed "[he] laid pain and paranoia under his deceptively gentle songs, and retired early having conquered gospel, funk, blues, disco and more." In Rolling Stone, Andy Greene noted that several of his songs "are embedded in the culture and have been covered countless times."

Writing for The New York Times, Giovanni Russonello considered Withers "[a] soulful singer with a gift for writing understated classics", adding, "the ultimate homespun hitmaker, he had an innate sense of what might make a song memorable, and little interest in excess attitude or accoutrements. Ultimately Withers reminded us that it's the everyday that is the most meaningful: work, family, love, loss." A Billboard article considered that Withers "stands as one of R&B/soul music's most revered singer-songwriters." In the same magazine, writer Gail Mitchell acknowledged "Withers' legacy has flourished in the decades since, thanks to a cross-section of artists who have covered/sampled his songs or cited him as a major influence."

Musician and music journalist Questlove referred to Withers' post-breakup 1974 album +'Justments as "a diary [...] [it] was a pre-reality-show look at his life. Keep in mind this was years before Marvin Gaye did it with Here, My Dear." The Beach Boys' Brian Wilson deemed Withers "a songwriter's songwriter". Musicians Sade, D'Angelo, Justin Timberlake, John Legend, and Ed Sheeran have credited him as a music inspiration.

Withers has been widely sampled by hip-hop and pop music artists, including Basehead, Blackstreet, Kendrick Lamar, DMX, Tupac Shakur, Jennifer Lopez and Aaliyah.

In 2023, Rolling Stone ranked Withers at number 106 on its list of the 200 Greatest Singers of All Time. The Library of Congress' National Recording Registry inducted "Ain't No Sunshine" in the 2024 list of 25 sound recordings. In September 2025, he was selected for induction into the National Rhythm and Blues Hall of Fame, and was inducted the following month.

On March 28, 2025, a 7 foot (2.1 m) bronze statue of Withers was unveiled in his hometown of Beckley, West Virginia. It is located in Bill Withers Plaza.

For Record Store Day on November 27, 2026, Bill Withers In Concert - Live at the BBC, 1974 will be released.

== Personal life and death ==
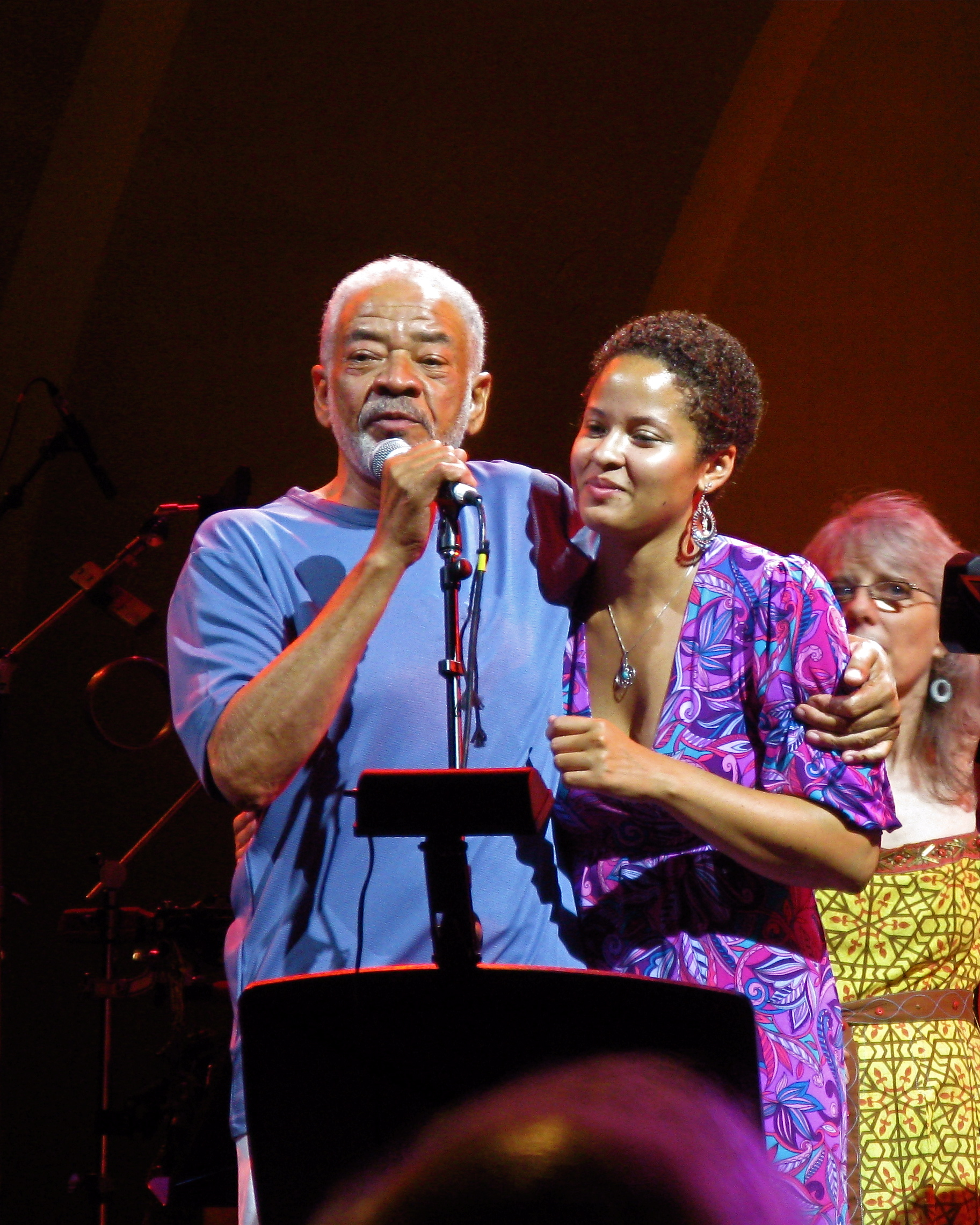
Withers with his daughter Kori at a 2008 tribute concert

Withers married actress Denise Nicholas in 1973 during her stint on the sitcom Room 222. They divorced the following year. In 1976, Withers married Marcia Johnson, and they had two children: Todd and Kori. Marcia eventually assumed the direct management of his publishing companies, in which his children also became involved as they became adults.

Withers died from heart complications in a Los Angeles hospital on March 30, 2020, at age 81; his family announced his death four days later. Withers had both lung and heart problems. He was cremated at Forest Lawn – Hollywood Hills Cemetery in its crematory, and his ashes were subsequently interred in an unmarked grave.

== Discography ==
Studio albums

- Just as I Am (1971)
- Still Bill (1972)
- +'Justments (1974)
- Making Music (1975)
- Naked & Warm (1976)
- Menagerie (1977)
- 'Bout Love (1979)
- Watching You, Watching Me (1985)

Live albums

- Live at Carnegie Hall (1973)

Compilation albums

- The Best of Bill Withers (1975)
- The Best of Bill Withers (1980)
- Bill Withers' Greatest Hits (1981)
- Lean on Me: The Best of Bill Withers (1994)
- The Best of Bill Withers: Lean on Me (2000)
- The Ultimate Bill Withers Collection (2000)
- Lovely Day: The Very Best of Bill Withers (2005)
- Ain't No Sunshine: The Best of Bill Withers (2008)
- Playlist: The Very Best of Bill Withers (2009)
- The Essential Bill Withers (2013)

== Accolades ==
=== Grammy Awards ===
The Grammy Awards are bestowed by The Recording Academy. Withers has won three Grammys from nine nominations.

Grammy wins and nominations for Bill Withers
Year	Nominee / work	Award	Result
1971	Bill Withers	Best New Artist	Nominated
1971	"Ain't No Sunshine"	Best Pop Vocal Performance Male	Nominated
1971	"Ain't No Sunshine"	Best Rhythm & Blues Song	Won
1981	"Just the Two of Us"	Record of the Year	Nominated
1981	"Just the Two of Us"	Song of the Year	Nominated
1981	"Just the Two of Us"	Best Pop Vocal Performance Male	Nominated
1981	"Just the Two of Us"	Best Rhythm & Blues Song	Won
1984	"In the Name of Love" (featuring Ralph MacDonald)	Best Male R&B Vocal Performance	Nominated
1987	"Lean on Me"	Best Rhythm & Blues Song	Won

=== Honors ===
- 2005: Inducted into Songwriters Hall of Fame
- 2006: ASCAP Rhythm & Soul Heritage award
- 2007: Inducted into West Virginia Music Hall of Fame
- 2015: Inducted into Rock and Roll Hall of Fame
- 2017: Honorary degree from West Virginia University
- 2025: Inducted into National Rhythm & Blues Hall of Fame
