= Stay Free (album) =

Studio album by Ashford & Simpson
- Released: 9 August 1979
- Recorded: 1979
- Studios: Sigma Sound, New York City
- Genres: R&B, disco
- Length: 39:10
- Label: Warner Bros.
- Producers: Nickolas Ashford, Valerie Simpson

Ashford & Simpson chronology
Is It Still Good to Ya (1978)	Stay Free (1979)	A Musical Affair (1980)

Singles from Stay Free
- 1. "Found a Cure" Released: June 1979; 2. "Nobody Knows" Released: October 1979

Stay Free is an album by the American R&B duo Ashford & Simpson, released in 1979. It peaked at No. 23 on the Billboard 200.

"Found a Cure" peaked at No. 1 on Billboard's Disco Top 100 chart.

== Critical reception ==
Professional ratings
Review scores
Source	Rating
AllMusic	3/5 stars
Robert Christgau	B+
The Encyclopedia of Popular Music	3/5 stars

Robert Christgau praised the "groove" of the songs, but noted that Stay Free didn't reach the same highs as previous albums. The Bay State Banner thought that the duo's "production adds tough, jumping instrumental accompaniment behind them, and keeps their torrid exchanges prominently in the middle of an aggressively mixed work."

AllMusic wrote that "the title track was spectacular, and the rest of the album was expertly produced, performed, and arranged." The Philadelphia Inquirer stated that the pair "sang about marriage, commitment and difficult relationships with frankness and a sense of romance that was untainted by sentimentality."

== Track listing ==
All tracks composed by Nickolas Ashford and Valerie Simpson

1. "Found a Cure" – 7:01
2. "Stay Free" – 5:28
3. "Dance Forever" – 5:48
4. "Nobody Knows" – 6:34
5. "Crazy" – 3:40
6. "Finally Got to Me" – 4:41
7. "Follow Your Heart" – 4:46

== Personnel ==
- Nickolas Ashford and Valerie Simpson – lead vocals, backing vocals
- Eric Gale, Steve Khan – guitar
- Francisco Centeno, Anthony Jackson – bass
- Chris Parker, Steve Gadd, Jimmy Young – drums
- Ralph MacDonald – percussion, congas, Syndrums
- David Carey – timpani
- Ray Chew – Minimoog synthesizer, piano, Fender Rhodes electric piano
- Valerie Simpson – piano
- Ullanda McCullough, Chandra Armstead, Frank Floyd, Jo Armstead – backing vocals
- Eddie Daniels, George Young – flute
- Seldon Powell – horns
- Alfred Brown – strings
- John Davis, Paul Riser, Rob Mounsey – string and horn arrangements
