= Otey =

Otey may refer to:

== People ==
- Alex Otey (born 1959), American singer-songwriter
- Bill Otey (1886–1931), American pitcher
- Harold Lamont Otey (1951–1994), American murderer
- James Hervey Otey (1800–1863), American Episcopal bishop
- Kirkwood Otey (1832–1897), American commanding officer of the 11th Virginia Infantry
- Louis Otey (born 1954), American baritone singer
- Orlando Otey (1925–2011), Mexican-born pianist
- Peter J. Otey (1840–1902), American Confederate States Army officer
- Otey Cannon (born 1950), American former soccer forward
- Otey Clark (1915–2010), American Major League Baseball pitcher

== Places ==
- Otey, Texas, an unincorporated community
- William Madison Otey House, a historic residence in Alabama

== See also ==
- Otay (disambiguation)
