= Inside Moves (album) =

Studio album by Grover Washington Jr.
- Released: 1984
- Recorded: March–June 1984
- Studio: Rosebud Recording, New York City
- Genre: Jazz
- Length: 38:52
- Label: Elektra 960 318-1
- Producer: Grover Washington, Jr., Ralph MacDonald

Grover Washington Jr. chronology
The Best Is Yet to Come (1982)	Inside Moves (1984)	Togethering (1985)

Professional ratings
Review scores
Source	Rating
AllMusic	1.5/5 stars
The Rolling Stone Jazz & Blues Album Guide	2/5 stars

Inside Moves is a 1984 studio album by American jazz musician Grover Washington Jr., released via the Elektra label.

== Reception ==
Scott Yanow of AllMusic wrote: "Although Grover Washington Jr. (on alto, tenor, soprano and baritone) puts on his usual strong effort, the forgettable material (which included no hits) and the emphasis on vocals (particularly those of Jon Lucien who is on five of the seven selections) makes this one of Washington's weaker efforts and the least essential of his four Elektra recordings. The background vocalists do not help much either. This was Grover Washington, Jr.'s only full-length album as a leader during the 1982-86 period but was not worth the effort". In contrast, Ken Franckling of United Press International praised the album, stating that it was "a funky fusion of jazz with rhythm and blues, dominated by Washington's soulful, sometimes haunting saxophone work, particularly on the title track."

== Track listing ==
No.	Title	Writer(s)	Length
1.	"Inside Moves"	Steve Gadd, Ralph MacDonald, William Salter	5:52
2.	"Dawn Song"	Marcus Miller	4:31
3.	"Watching You Watching Me"	Bill Eaton	5:28
4.	"Secret Sounds"	Grover Washington, Jr.	5:28
5.	"Jet Stream"	Grover Washington, Jr., Art Sorenson, Richard Lee Steacker	5:31
6.	"When I Look at You"	Walter Jurmann, Paul Francis Webster	6:00
7.	"Sassy Stew"	Grover Washington, Jr.	5:30
Total length:			38:52

== Personnel ==
- Grover Washington Jr. – alto, baritone, soprano and tenor saxophones
- Richard Tee – Fender Rhodes
- Marcus Miller – Roland Jupiter-8, Yamaha DX7, bass (1, 2, 4–7)
- Eric Gale – guitars
- Anthony Jackson – bass (3)
- Steve Gadd – drums (1)
- Buddy Williams – drums (2–7)
- Ralph MacDonald – drum programming, congas, percussion (1–4), arrangements
- Anthony MacDonald – percussion (5–7)
- William Eaton – arrangements, backing vocals (3)
- Jon Lucien – featured vocals
- Frank Floyd – backing vocals (3)
- Hilda Harris – backing vocals (3)
- Yvonne Lewis – backing vocals (3, 5, 6)
- Ullanda McCullough – backing vocals (3)
- Zack Saunders – backing vocals (3)
- Lani Groves – backing vocals (5, 6)
- Maeretha Stewart – backing vocals (5, 6)

Strings on "Watching You Watching Me"

- Alfred Brown – conductor
- William Eaton – leader
- Jonathan Abramowitz – cello
- Kermit Moore – cello
- Julien Barber – viola
- Sanford Allen – violin
- Lewis Eley – violin
- Max Ellen – violin
- Winterton Garvey – violin
- Paul Gershman – violin
- Theodore Israel – violin
- Harry Lookofsky – violin
- Marvin Morgenstern – violin
- David Nadien – violin
- Matthew Raimondi – violin

== Production ==
- Grover Washington Jr. – producer, mixing
- Ralph MacDonald – producer
- William Eaton – co-producer
- William Salter – co-producer
- Kendall Brown – engineer
- Ed Heath – assistant engineer
- Peter Humphreys – mixing
- Barry Craig – mix assistant
- Scott E. MacMinn – mix assistant
- Nimitr Sarikananda – mastering
- Carol Friedman – art direction, photography
- JoDee Stringham – design

Studios

- Mixed at Sigma Sound Studios (Philadelphia, PA).
- Mastered at Frankford Wayne (Philadelphia, PA).

== Charts ==
Chart (1984)	Peak position
US Billboard Pop Albums	79
