= John Blake Jr. =

American jazz violinist

- Born: July 3, 1947; South Philadelphia, Pennsylvania, U.S.
- Died: August 15, 2014 (aged 67) Philadelphia, Pennsylvania, U.S.
- Genres: Jazz
- Occupation: Violinist
- Instrument: Violin
- Website: johnblakejr.com

John Edward Blake Jr. (July 3, 1947 – August 15, 2014) was an American jazz violinist from South Philadelphia, Pennsylvania, United States. He performed most prominently as a sideman in groups led by Grover Washington Jr. (in the late 1970s) and McCoy Tyner (in the early 1980s), as well as led his own groups.

His son Johnathan Blake is an accomplished jazz drummer, bandleader and composer.

He died on August 15, 2014, from complications of multiple myeloma.

== Discography ==
=== As leader ===
- Maiden Dance (Gramavision, 1984)
- Twinkling of an Eye (Gramavision, 1985)
- Rhythm & BLU (Gramavision, 1986)
- Adventures of the Heart (Gramavision, 1987)
- A New Beginning (Gramavision, 1988)
- Quest (Sunnyside, 1992)
- Motherless Child (Artists Recording Collective, 2010)

=== As sideman ===
With James Newton

- James Newton (Gramavision, 1983)
- Luella (Gramavision, 1984)
- The African Flower (Blue Note, 1985)

With McCoy Tyner

- Horizon (Milestone, 1980)
- La Leyenda de La Hora (Columbia, 1981)
- Dimensions (Elektra Musician, 1984)

With Grover Washington Jr.

- Live at The Bijou (Kudu, 1977)
- Reed Seed (Motown, 1978)
- Paradise (Elektra, 1979)

With others

- Muhal Richard Abrams, Colors in Thirty-Third (Black Saint, 1987)
- Catalyst, Unity (Muse, 1974)
- Catalyst, A Tear and a Smile (Muse, 1976)
- Norman Connors, You Are My Starship (Buddah, 1976)
- Will Downing, Moods (Mercury, 1995)
- Carlos Garnett, Let This Melody Ring On (Muse, 1975)
- Damon Harris, Damon (Fantasy, 1978)
- George Howard, Asphalt Gardens (Palo Alto, 1982)
- Cecil McBee, Flying Out (India Navigation, 1982)
- Carmen McRae, I'm Coming Home Again (Buddah, 1980)
- Carmen McRae, Ms. Magic (Del Rack, 1986)
- Marvin Peterson, Children of the Fire (Sunrise, 1974)
- Vanessa Rubin, I'm Glad There Is You (Novus/RCA, 1994)
- Gilberto Santa Rosa, En Vivo Desde El Carnegie Hall (Sony, 1995)
- Avery Sharpe, Legends & Mentors (JKNM, 2008)
- Archie Shepp, Attica Blues (Impulse!/ABC, 1972)
- Archie Shepp, The Cry of My People (Impulse!/ABC, 1973)
- O. C. Smith, What'cha Gonna Do (Rendezvous, 1986)
- Jamaaladeen Tacuma, Brotherzone (P-Vine, 1999)
- Steve Turre, Fire and Ice (Stash, 1988)
- Steve Turre, Right There (Antilles, 1991)
- James Blood Ulmer, Harmolodic Guitar with Strings (DIW, 1997)
- Gerald Veasley, Look Ahead (Heads Up, 1992)
- Gerald Veasley, Soul Control (Inak, 1997)
- Kazumi Watanabe, The Best Performance (Better Days, 1982)
- Paula West, Come What May (Hi Horse, 2001)
- Buster Williams, Dreams Come True (Buddah, 1980)

== Bibliography ==
- Richard Cook: Jazz Encyclopedia. Penguin, London, 2007, ISBN 978-0-14-102646-6
