= Is It Still Good to Ya =

Studio album by Ashford & Simpson
- Released: 1978
- Studios: Sigma Sound, New York City
- Genres: R&B, disco
- Label: Warner Bros.
- Producers: Nickolas Ashford, Valerie Simpson

Ashford & Simpson chronology
Send It (1977)	Is It Still Good to Ya (1978)	Stay Free (1979)

Professional ratings
Review scores
Source	Rating
AllMusic	4.5/5 stars
Christgau's Record Guide	A−
The Rolling Stone Album Guide	4/5 stars

Is It Still Good to Ya is the sixth studio album recorded by American vocal duo Ashford & Simpson, released in 1978 on the Warner Bros. label. The album was remastered and reissued with bonus tracks in 2015 by Big Break Records. The album sold more than 500,000 copies in its first two years of release.

== Chart performance ==
The album peaked at No. 1 on the R&B albums chart. It also reached No. 20 on the Billboard 200. The album features the single, "It Seems to Hang On", which peaked at No. 2 on the Hot Soul Singles chart. The title track also charted at No. 12 on the Hot Soul Singles chart.

The title track was subsequently covered by Teddy Pendergrass, in a version produced by the duo on his 1980 album T.P. which peaked at No. 3 on the R&B albums chart and No. 14 on the Billboard 200.

== Track listing ==
All tracks are written by Nickolas Ashford and Valerie Simpson.

Side one
No.	Title	Length
1.	"It Seems to Hang On"	5:08
2.	"Is It Still Good to Ya"	3:49
3.	"The Debt Is Settled"	3:50
4.	"Ain't It a Shame"	4:54

Side two
No.	Title	Length
1.	"Get Up and Do Something"	4:52
2.	"You Always Could"	3:32
3.	"Flashback"	3:55
4.	"As Long as It Holds You"	3:58

2015 remastered reissue bonus tracks
No.	Title	Length
9.	"It Seems to Hang On" (12" Disco Mix)	6:59
10.	"Flashback" (12" Disco Mix)	5:31
11.	"Is It Still Good to Ya" (Alternative Mix)	4:37
12.	"The Debt Is Settled" (Alternative Mix)	4:25
13.	"It Seems to Hang On" (Mike Maurro Mix)	7:51
14.	"Flashback" (Single Version)	3:39
15.	"It Seems to Hang On" (Single Version)	3:39

== Personnel ==
- Ashford & Simpson - vocals
- Eric Gale - guitar
- Francisco Centeno - bass
- Valerie Simpson - piano
- Ray Chew - Fender Rhodes, synthesizer
- John Sussewell, Steve Jordan - drums
- Ralph MacDonald - percussion
- John Davis, William Slapin - horns
- Ashford & Simpson, Ray Simpson, Ullanda McCullough - backing vocals

== Charts ==
=== Weekly charts ===
Chart (1978–1979)	Peak position
US Billboard 200	20
US Top R&B/Hip-Hop Albums (Billboard)	1

=== Year-end charts ===
Chart (1979)	Position
US Top R&B/Hip-Hop Albums (Billboard)	15

=== Singles ===
Year	Single	Peak
Year	Single	US R&B
1978	"It Seems to Hang On"	2
1978	"Is It Still Good to Ya"	12
1979	"Flashback"	70

== See also ==
- List of number-one R&B albums of 1978 (U.S.)
