= Alex Otey =

- Born: 1959 (age 66–67)
- Origin: United States
- Genres: Jazz, Americana, Children's music, Classical, folk-rock
- Occupations: Singer-songwriter, producer, musician, composer
- Instruments: Trumpet, piano
- Years active: 1979–present
- Label: Ionian Productions
- Website: www.alexotey.com

Alex Otey (born 1959) is a singer-songwriter, music producer, pianist, and trumpeter. He has performed with jazz musicians such as Richie Cole and Lew Soloff, and recorded with Grover Washington Jr. on the 1979 Skylarking album. He has produced, arranged, and co-written five albums by children's singer-songwriter Miss Amy, and released the albums on his label Ionian Productions. The fifth of these albums, Fitness Rock & Roll, was nominated in the 54th Grammy Awards, and Healthy Food For Thought: Good Enough To Eat was nominated the year before. He also appears on the 54th Grammy winning album, All About Bullies... Big And Small.

He performs frequently with Miss Amy & Her Big Kids Band, and in 2013 released an album entitled Angels Riding Shotgun with Americana rock band Off the Map, which features the same line-up of musicians. Otey also performs popular vocal jazz as a soloist and with The Alex Otey Trio.

== Early life, education ==
Alex V. Otey was born in 1959 in the United States. His mother is Pat Wood, and his father, Orlando Otey, was a Mexican-American concert pianist and composer. His father was executive director of the Wilmington Music School in Wilmington, Delaware during Otey's childhood, which provided him with early formal instruction in music. He was training in classical trumpet and percussion at age 7.

As a teenager he began playing piano and singing, appearing in the Wilmington Symphony and competing in regional music competitions. He studied trumpet with Seymor Rosenfeld of the Philadelphia Orchestra until the age of 18.

In highschool he began performing "piano man" style arrangements, and has cited singer-songwriters such as Billy Joel and Elton John as influences. According to Otey, his style was also shaped by Harry Connick Jr., Frank Sinatra's ballads, jazz standards, and hits from the Beatles, Van Morrison and Sting. He graduated from Friends' Central School in Philadelphia in 1978.

As a teen and young adult he formed a number of small ensembles such as the APO Jazz Trio, which performed around Philadelphia. He performed with jazz musicians such as Richie Cole and Lew Soloff, and recorded with Grover Washington Jr. on the 1979 Skylarking album. In 1984 graduated from Drexel University in Philadelphia, with a degree in Physics and Atmospheric Science. He has worked as a computer engineer as well.

== Music career ==
=== Collaborations with Miss Amy ===
Otey met his wife, singer-songwriter Miss Amy, and they began playing in jazz, folk and rock bands together. After the birth of their son in the mid-1990s the family moved to New Jersey, and Miss Amy began focusing on children's music, specifically of the sort to help children move and exercise.

Alex Otey produced, co-wrote, and helped arrange Miss Amy's first album, Swimming, and handles trumpet, keyboard, and backup vocals in Miss Amy & Her Big Kids Band, founded in 2004. Along with the band he performed at the White House 2010 Egg Roll event, where other performers included Justin Bieber, J.K. Rowling, and the cast from Glee. He and Miss Amy & Her Big Kids Band also headlined Kidstock 2010.

He has produced five albums with Miss Amy since 2004, handling, for example, collaborative arranging, engineering, production, keyboard, trumpet and back-up vocals on 2011's Miss Amy's Fitness Rock and Roll, which blended jazz, rock, pop, broadway, and lullabies.

Fitness Rock & Roll was released on his label, Ionian Productions. In November 2011 the album was nominated for a 54th Grammy Award in the category of "Best Children's Album." That year Otey also contributed the track "Keep Your Chin Up" to the Grammy-winning compilation All About Bullies... Big And Small.

=== Ionian Productions ===
Ionian Productions, Inc.
- Founded: 2003
- Founder: Alex Otey
- Status: Active
- Genre: Various (classical, children's)
- Location: New Jersey, United States
- Official website: IonianProductions.com

Otey is the founder and president of the audio/video production company Ionian Productions. The company has produced LPs such as A Gift To Be Free, releases by Miss Amy, and The Chopin of Mexico Plays Chopin 1&2. Other artists include pianist and composer Leonardo Le San, Sue Tally, Pedro Ledezma, and Leticia Gómez-Tagle.

In August 2012 Ionian Productions released Tenochtitlan 1325, which includes piano pieces composed by his father, Orlando Otey. The album was well-received; according to Robert Schulslaper, "Orlando Otey played the piano with panache and considerable skill, reveling in music's capacity for passionate extroversion as well as lyrical reflection. His compositions reflect a genuine talent, curious about modern trends (but stopping short of atonality) and capable of fashioning diverse influences into a convincing artistic statement."

=== Recent years ===
Otey continues performs as a solo act at venues in central New Jersey and Philadelphia. He also performs with some West Trenton based bands, one of which is the Americana and rock group Off The Map, which Otey formed with the same lineup as Miss Amy The Big Kids Band. Their first album, Angels Riding Shotgun, was produced by Otey and released on Ionian Productions. Otey also plays standards, pop, and jazz with The Alex Otey Trio, and events with The Wild Rice Band.

== Discography ==
=== Album contributions ===
Year	Title	Artist	Label	Role
1979	Skylarking	Grover Washington, Jr.	Kudu, Motown, Elektra, Columbia	trumpet
2004	Underwater	Miss Amy	Ionian Productions	keyboards, trumpet, backup vocals, producer and engineer
2005	Wide Wide World	Miss Amy	Ionian Productions	keyboards, trumpet, backup vocals, producer and engineer
2006	My Precious One	Miss Amy	Ionian Productions	keyboards, trumpet, backup vocals, producer and engineer
2007	I Wanna Know How It Works!	Miss Amy	Ionian Productions	keyboards, trumpet, backup vocals, producer and engineer
2007	The Chopin of Mexico Plays Chopin	Orlando Otey	Ionian Productions	producer and engineer
2008	The Chopin of Mexico Plays More Chopin	Orlando Otey	Ionian Productions	producer and engineer
2010	Fitness Rock & Roll	Miss Amy	Ionian Productions	keyboards, trumpet, backup vocals, producer and engineer
2013	Angels Riding Shotgun	Off the Map	Ionian Productions	keyboards, trumpet, backup vocals, producer and engineer
2017	Love Matters Now	Alex Otey Trio	Winter Cat Records	vocals & piano, trumpet, producer and engineer

=== Compilations ===
- WXPN Kids Corner 20th Anniversary Compilation (2008)
- Wildflower Compilation (2010)
- Healthy Food For Thought, Good Enough to Eat (2010)
- All About Bullies... Big And Small Compilation (2011)
- Move This World (2013)

=== Grammy Awards ===
Year	Song/album	Category	Role	Result
2011	Healthy Food For Thought, Good Enough to Eat	Grammy Award for Best Spoken Word Album for Children	Participant Producer, Artist and arranger	Nominated
2012	Miss Amy's Fitness Rock & Roll	Grammy Award for Best Children's Album	Producer, arranger, Songwriting and Participant Artist	Nominated
2012	All About Bullies... Big And Small Compilation (track "Keep Your Head Up")	54th Grammy Awards	Participant Producer, Artist and arranger	Won

== See also ==
- Miss Amy
