= A Secret Place =

Studio album by Grover Washington Jr.
- Released: December 15, 1976
- Recorded: October 1976
- Studio: Van Gelder Studio, Englewood Cliffs
- Genre: Jazz fusion, smooth jazz
- Length: 33:47
- Label: Kudu
- Producer: Creed Taylor

Grover Washington Jr. chronology
Feels So Good (1975)	A Secret Place (1976)	Live at The Bijou (1978)

Professional ratings
Review scores
Source	Rating
Allmusic	4/5 stars
The Rolling Stone Jazz & Blues Album Guide	2/5 stars

A Secret Place is the sixth album by jazz saxophonist Grover Washington Jr. and his last studio album for Kudu Records. The album topped the Billboard Jazz Albums chart and reached number seven on the Soul Albums chart in 1977.

== Background ==
"Tenor and soprano saxophonist Grover Washington Jr. was faced with an almost impossible task in 1976: following up his two 1975 critically acclaimed and wildly successful commercial recordings Mister Magic and Feels So Good. Both recordings crossed over to R&B on the radio and on the charts. A Secret Place was produced by Creed Taylor and issued on his Kudu imprint, while the versatile David Matthews arranged the horn section. The players include pianist Dave Grusin, drummer Harvey Mason, Ralph MacDonald on percussion, bassist Anthony Jackson, guitarist Eric Gale, trumpeter John Gatchell and alto saxophonist Gerry Niewood. Guests include bassist George Mraz and guitarist Steve Khan, who appear only on a reading of Herbie Hancock's "Dolphin Dance."

This lineup may not be surprising, but the scope of the recording is. Washington could have gone the easy route and followed up his R&B chart success with a series of uptempo, rousing tracks that leaned heavier on funk – in the style of the title tracks of both the previous albums. But he went in a different direction, at least partially. There are four cuts here, each between eight and nine minutes. The two which comprise side one of the LP, the title track and Hancock's tune, are a bit more laid-back and mysterious. Washington takes his time letting them unfold, utilizing dynamics. "A Secret Place" does have a slippery funky backbeat, and a killer guitar line by Gale, but the groove is nocturnal, spacy and soulful. His soprano sings over the backbeat as Grusin's Rhodes piano plays down a vamp for the rhythm section, and fills in the painted backdrop beautifully. The tempo picks up with Jackson's bassline becoming more prominent in the mix, but it never overpowers the easy groove established at the beginning. "Dolphin Dance" begins every bit as sparely and exotically spacious as Hancock's own version, with beautiful soprano and alto work, gorgeous floating Rhodes piano, and lots of warmth.When it begins to swing near the middle, it does so in such a relaxed and languid manner that the shift from soul-jazz on the preceding tune to the straight-up fingerpopping nightclub swing on this one is seamless. "Not Yet" opens the second half of the set. It's a funky groove, but the easy, laid-back feel and chord changes in this Washington original make it irresistibly sexy. Once more, Gale's guitar pleases as it leads the horn section vamps that fill his sophisticated, soulful, bluesed-out solo. The lilt in Grusin's Rhodes piano is the perfect tastemaker, since Washington's tenor is so throaty and on the low-end growl. Harvey Mason's straight up funky soul number "Love Makes It Better," takes the set out on a high note, with gorgeous guitar vamps by Gale, the three-horn line playing a sparse but pronounced melody line, and Grusin filling the middle with enough sweetness and light to offer the drums and percussion room to pop. Washington's tenor solo is sophisticated and tasteful; its emotion ratchets up the dynamic in the entire tune. The bottom line on A Secret Place is that while the set did well commercially, it got nowhere near the critical praise of its predecessors. That's a shame, because it is a truly fine album whose grooves and pleasures stand the test of time easily. It's ripe for reappraisal."

== Reception ==
Thom Jurek of AllMusic commented "Washington's tenor solo is sophisticated and utterly tasteful; its emotion ratchets up the dynamic in the entire tune. The bottom line on A Secret Place is that while the set did well commercially, it got nowhere near the critical praise of its predecessors. That's a shame, because it is a truly fine album whose grooves and pleasures stand the test of time easily. It's ripe for reappraisal". A reviewer of Dusty Groove noted 'Nothing too secret about this record – given that it was one of Grover Washington's biggest hits of the 70s, and for good reason too! The album features four long tracks – all stretched out and layered together with washes of funky, yet subtle sounds – in a perfect blend that let Washington really stretch out on his solos, blowing with a great deal of soul over some hip instrumentation that includes Dave Grusin on electric piano, Anthony Jackson on bass, Harvey Mason on drums, and Ralph McDonald on percussion. There's a lean quality to the record that's completely sublime (why can't they make sets like this anymore?) – and although smooth, things are never slick – wonderfully soulful throughout, in that magic mode that Grover hit on a handful of key 70s albums!"

== Track listing ==
1. "A Secret Place" (Grover Washington Jr.) – 8:14
2. "Dolphin Dance" (Herbie Hancock) – 8:50
3. "Not Yet" (Grover Washington Jr.) – 8:36
4. "Love Makes It Better" (Harvey Mason) – 8:07

== Personnel ==
- Grover Washington Jr. – soprano saxophone, tenor saxophone
- Dave Grusin – acoustic piano, Fender Rhodes
- Eric Gale – guitar (1, 3, 4)
- Steve Khan – guitar (2)
- Anthony Jackson – bass (1, 3, 4)
- George Mraz – bass (2)
- Harvey Mason – drums
- Ralph MacDonald – percussion
- Gerry Niewood – alto saxophone
- John Gatchell – trumpet
- David Matthews – horn arrangements

== Production ==
- Creed Taylor – producer
- Rudy Van Gelder – engineer
- Rene Schumacher – album design
- Richard Alcorn – photography

== Charts ==
Chart (1977)	Peak position
Billboard Pop Albums	31
Billboard Top Soul Albums	7
Billboard Top Jazz Albums	1
