= Love Zone (Ullanda McCullough album) =

Studio album by Ullanda McCullough
- Released: 1979
- Recorded: 1979
- Genre: R&B, soul
- Label: Ariola
- Producer: Bernard Drayton, George McMahon, Leon Pendarvis

Ullanda McCullough chronology
Love Zone (1979)	Ullanda McCullough (1981)

Love Zone is the first solo debut album by R&B/soul singer and backing vocalist Ullanda McCullough, released on Ocean/Ariola Records in 1979. It features the soul cover version of "Want Ads", originally done by 70's female soul group Honey Cone and "Stars", written by George McMahon and Leon Pendarvis. The album was produced by Bernard Drayton, George McMahon and Leon Pendarvis.

== Track listing ==
1. "Stars" (George McMahon, Leon Pendarvis) 10:22
2. "Gotta Dance Now" (George McMahon, Leon Pendarvis, Ullanda McCullough) 4:36
3. "Time For You and Me" (George McMahon, Leon Pendarvis) 5:11
4. "Want Ads" (Barney Perkins, General Norman Johnson, Greg Perry) 5:13
5. "Love Zone" (Nickolas Ashford & Valerie Simpson) 5:37
6. "Around and Around" (Frank Floyd, Ullanda McCullough) 5:14

== Charts ==
=== Singles ===
Year	Single	Chart positions		
Year	Single	US	US R&B	US Dance
1979	"Want Ads"	?	65	17
1979	Around and Around	?	84	—

== Personnel ==
Stars

- Arranged By – Leon Pendarvis
- Backing Vocals – Frank Floyd, Gwen Guthrie, Leon Pendarvis, Ullanda McCullough, Vivian Cherry
- Bass – Francisco Centeno
- Drums – Chris Parker
- Engineer [Assistant] – Tom Greto Guitar – Cliff Morris, Steve Khan
- Keyboards – Leon Pendarvis
- Mixed By [Disco Mix] – John Luongo
- Percussion – Arthur Jenkins, Jimmy Maelen
- Recorded By, Mixed By – Ed Rak
- Saxophone, Soloist – George Young
- Synthesizer – Rob Mounsey

Gotta Dance Now

- Arranged By – Leon Pendarvis
- Backing Vocals – Ullanda McCullough, Vivian Cherry, Yvonne Lewis
- Bass – Wilbur Bascomb
- Congas – Arthur Jenkins
- Drums – Chris Parker
- Guitar – Hiram Bullock, Joe Caro
- Keyboards – Leon Pendarvis
- Percussion – Errol "Crusher" Bennett, Rubens Bassini
- Synthesizer – Rob Mounsey

Time For You And Me

- Arranged By – Leon Pendarvis
- Bass – Anthony Jackson
- Congas – Arthur Jenkins
- Drums – Chris Parker
- Guitar – Jeff Mironov, Joe Caro
- Keyboards – Leon Pendarvis
- Percussion – Errol "Crusher" Bennett, Rubens Bassini

Want Ads

- Arranged By – Leon Pendarvis
- Backing Vocals – Gwen Guthrie, Ullanda McCullough, Vivian Cherry
- Bass – Francisco Centeno
- Drums – Chris Parker
- Electric Piano [Fender Rhodes] – Ray Chew
- Guitar – Jeff Mironov, Joe Caro
- Percussion – Errol "Crusher" Bennett, Arthur Jenkins, Rubens Bassini
- Piano – Leon Pendarvis
- Saxophone, Soloist – Harold Vick
- Synthesizer – Rob Mounsey

Love Zone

- Arranged By – Ray Chew
- Backing Vocals – Ullanda McCullough, Vivian Cherry, Yvonne Lewis
- Bass – Francisco Centeno
- Drums – Chris Parker
- Electric Piano [Fender Rhdoes] – Leon Pendarvis
- Guitar – Jeff Mironov, Joe Caro
- Percussion – Errol "Crusher" Bennett, Arthur Jenkins, Rubens Bassini
- Piano, Synthesizer – Ray Chew

Around And Around

- Arranged By – Ray Chew
- Bass – Will Lee
- Drums – Chris Parker
- Electric Piano [Fender Rhodes] – Leon Pendarvis
- Guitar – Hiram Bullock, Joe Caro
- Percussion – Arthur Jenkins
- Piano – Ray Chew
- Synthesizer – Ray Chew

== Companies etc ==
- Phonographic Copyright (p) – Ariola America, Inc.
- Recorded At – Power Station
- Recorded At – A&R Studios
- Recorded At – Automated Sound Studios
- Mastered At – Kendun Recorders
- Copyright (c) – Ocean Records
- Phonographic Copyright (p) – Ocean Records

== Credits ==
- Art Direction – Michael Duncan Jackson
- Contractor – Sephra Herman
- Coordinator [Album Coordinator] – Mary Roach, Sally Paulson, Sue Evans
- Engineer [Assistant] – Ollie Cotton, Jr., Peter Robbins, Steve Ettinger, Tom Greto
- Horns – Alan Rubin, David Taylor, George Young, Harold Vick, Howard Johnson, Virgil Jones
- Mastered By – John Golden
- Other [Clothes Designed By] – Kamali
- Other [Copying By] – Sammy's
- Other [Make-up By] – Rick Gillette
- Other [Ullanda's Hair By] – James Finney
- Photography By – Klaus Lucka
- Producer – Bernard Drayton, George McMahon, Leon Pendarvis
- Recorded By [Additional Recording By, A&r Studios] – Ed Rak, LeAnne Ungar
- Recorded By [Additional Recording By, Automated Studios] – Vicki Fabry
- Recorded By, Mixed By – Bill Scheniman (tracks: A2 to B3)
- Strings – Gerald Tarack, Kathryn Kienke, LaMar Alsop, Lewis Eley, Regis Iandiorio, Stanley Pollock, Tony Posk, Yoko Matsuo

== Notes ==
- Center Label: (p)1979 Ariola America, Inc. Beverly Hills, CA. 90211
- Inner sleeve: (c)(p)1979 Ocean Records, Beverly Hills, Ca. 90212
