= High-Rise (album) =

Studio album by Ashford & Simpson
- Released: August 1983
- Recorded: 1983
- Studio: Penny Lane, El Paso, Texas
- Genre: R&B; soul
- Label: Capitol
- Producer: Nickolas Ashford, Valerie Simpson

Ashford & Simpson chronology
Street Opera (1982)	High-Rise (1983)	Solid (1984)

Singles from High-Rise
- 1. "High-Rise" Released: 1983; 2. "It's Much Deeper" Released: 1983; 3. "I'm Not That Tough" Released: 1984

High-Rise is a studio album by American vocal duo Ashford & Simpson, released in 1983 on Capitol Records. It was their second album for Capitol.

== Critical reception ==
Professional ratings
Review scores
Source	Rating
AllMusic	2/5 stars
The Encyclopedia of Popular Music	3/5 stars

Hugh Wyatt of the New York Daily News found that the duo "manage on this latest vehicle to put back the word rhythm before blues through their powerful percussive, and at times, 'sanctified' singing styles... This is one of Ashford and Simpson's more compelling works."

The Virginia Pilot called High-Rise "a fine transitional record for the duo, where A&S added more dazzle and lights to their urbane sound without compromising its soulful essence."

== Chart performance ==
The album peaked at No. 14 on the Billboard R&B albums chart and No. 84 on the Billboard top albums chart. Three singles were released. The album's title track peaked at No. 17 on the Hot Black Singles chart, "It's Much Deeper" and "I'm Not That Tough" charted 45 and 78 respectively on the Hot Black Singles chart.

== Track listing ==
All writing by Nickolas Ashford and Valerie Simpson.

1. "High-Rise" - 5:35
2. "Side Effect" - 4:07
3. "Experience (Love Had No Face)" - 4:38
4. "It's a Rush" - 5:06
5. "My Kinda Pick Me Up" - 3:09
6. "I'm Not That Tough" - 4:34
7. "It's Much Deeper" - 6:30
8. "Still Such a Thing" - 5:13

2011 remastered reissue bonus tracks
No.	Title	Length
9.	"High-Rise" (single version)	4:01
10.	"It's Much Deeper" (single version)	3:50
11.	"I'm Not That Tough" (single version)	4:03
12.	"High-Rise" (12" version)	6:06
13.	"High-Rise" (12" M+M instrumental mix) mixed by John Morales & Sergio Munzibai)	5:27

== Personnel ==
- Nickolas Ashford – lead vocals, backing vocals, rhythm and vocal arrangements
- Valerie Simpson – lead vocals, backing vocals, acoustic piano, rhythm and vocal arrangements
- Ray Chew – Yamaha electric piano (1–5, 7, 8), vibraphone solo (1), Oberheim OB-X (4), Fender Rhodes (6), horns (6), strings (6); horn, rhythm and string arrangements
- Peter Cannarozzi – synthesizers (1, 6, 7), synth bass line (4)
- Ed Walsh – synthesizers (1, 4)
- Sid McGinnis – guitars (1, 2, 4, 5, 8), side effects (2), guitar solo (7)
- Francisco Centeno – bass
- Yogi Horton – drums (1, 2, 4, 6, 8)
- Steve Gadd – drums (3, 5, 7)
- Errol "Crusher" Bennett – percussion (1, 4)
- Ralph MacDonald – percussion (2, 3, 5–8)
- George Young – horns (2, 5), horn solo (5)
- Leon Pendarvis – horns (3), strings (3), horn and string arrangements
- Paul Riser – horns (8), strings (8), horn and string arrangements
- Sephra Herman – horns
- Alfred Brown – strings
- Vivian Cherry – backing vocals (1, 4, 7)
- Ullanda McCullough – backing vocals (2, 5, 6, 8)

== Charts ==
Chart (1983)	Peak position
US Billboard 200	84
US Top R&B/Hip-Hop Albums (Billboard)	14
