= Solid (Ashford & Simpson album) =

Studio album by Ashford & Simpson
- Released: November 1984
- Studio: 39th Street Music, New York City; Blank Tape, New York City; Clinton Recording, New York City; Right Track, New York City
- Genre: R&B; boogie; soul
- Label: Capitol
- Producer: Nickolas Ashford; Valerie Simpson; James Newton Howard; Elliot Scheiner (Track 6)

Ashford & Simpson chronology
| High-Rise (1983) | Solid (1984) | Real Love (1986) |

Professional ratings
Review scores
| Source | Rating |
|---|---|
| AllMusic | 4/5 stars |
| Christgau's Record Guide | B+ |

Solid is the eleventh studio album recorded by American vocal duo Ashford & Simpson, released in 1984 on the Capitol label. The album features the song "Solid", which became the songwriting duo's biggest hit as performers.

== Commercial performance ==
The album peaked at No. 1 on the US R&B albums chart on February 9, 1985. It also reached No. 29 on the Billboard 200. The album's title track peaked at No. 1 on the Hot Black Singles chart, No. 12 on the Billboard Hot 100 and No. 3 in the UK Singles Chart. Also featured are two other chart singles: "Outta the World" and "Babies".

== Track listing ==
All tracks are written by Nickolas Ashford and Valerie Simpson, except where noted.

Side one
| No. | Title | Length |
|---|---|---|
| 1. | "Solid" | 5:04 |
| 2. | "Outta the World" | 5:48 |
| 3. | "The Jungle" (from the Motion Picture Body Rock) | 2:51 |
| 4. | "Honey I Love You" | 3:58 |

Side two
| No. | Title | Writer(s) | Length |
|---|---|---|---|
| 5. | "Babies" | | 5:50 |
| 6. | "Closest to Love" (from the Motion Picture Body Rock) | Nickolas Ashford, Valerie Simpson, Phil Ramone, Phil Gladston | 4:10 |
| 7. | "Cherish Forever More" | | 3:48 |
| 8. | "Tonight We Escape" | | 3:14 |

1987 CD release – Solid...Plus Seven
| No. | Title | Length |
|---|---|---|
| 9. | "Side Effect" | 4:10 |
| 10. | "It's a Rush" | 4:49 |
| 11. | "My Kinda Pick Me Up" | 3:14 |
| 12. | "Still Such a Thing" | 5:16 |
| 13. | "Make It Work Again" | 4:20 |
| 14. | "Mighty Mighty Love" | 4:47 |
| 15. | "Part 1: Working Man / Reprise: Working Man" | 3:03 |

== Personnel ==
- Nickolas Ashford – vocals, backing vocals (1, 3, 5, 6, 9–12, 15)
- Valerie Simpson – vocals, backing vocals (1, 3, 5, 6, 9–12, 15), synthesizers (1, 3, 5, 7, 8), basic keyboards (2), bass (2), acoustic piano (4, 9–15)
- Ed Walsh – synthesizer programming (1, 5), synthesizers (3, 10, 13, 14)
- Joseph Joubert – synthesizers (2, 7, 8), LinnDrum (2), synthesizer arrangements (2), synth sound effects (5), strings (8)
- James Newton Howard – keyboards (6), drum programming (6)
- Ray Chew – Yamaha electric piano (9–12), Oberheim OB-X (10), Fender Rhodes (13–15), clavinet (14)
- Sid McGinnis – guitars (1, 3, 5, 9–12), side effects (9)
- Eric Gale – guitars (13–15)
- Francisco Centeno – bass (1, 3–5, 8–14)
- Peter Cannarozzi – synth bass line (10)
- Chris Parker – drums (1, 8, 13)
- Brian Brake – drums (3)
- James Doherty – LinnDrum (4), drum rolls (4)
- Tim Cox – LinnDrum (7), drum rolls (7)
- Yogi Horton – drums (9, 10, 12, 14, 15)
- Steve Gadd – drums (11)
- Jimmy Simpson – percussion (1)
- Sammy Figueroa – percussion (4, 8)
- Ralph MacDonald – percussion (6, 9, 11, 12)
- Errol "Crusher" Bennett – percussion (10, 13–15)
- Vinny Della Rocca – saxophone (1, 4, 5)
- Michael Brecker – sax solo (7)
- Dave Tofani – alto sax solo (15)
- Joe Mosello – trumpet (1, 4, 5)
- George Young – horns (9, 11), horn solo (11)
- Paul Riser – horns (12), strings (12)
- Leon Pendarvis – horn arrangements (14, 15), string arrangements (15)
- Sephra Herman – strings, copyist
- Ullanda McCullough – backing vocals (1, 3, 5, 9, 11, 12, 15)
- Ray Simpson – backing vocals (1)
- Vivian Cherry – backing vocals (6, 10)

Production

- Ashford & Simpson – producers; horn, rhythm and vocal arrangements
- James Newton Howard – producer (6)
- Elliot Scheiner – producer (6)
- Jimmy Simpson – co-producer, mixing
- Tim Cox – recording engineer
- Mick Cantarella – assistant engineer
- Robert Harari – assistant engineer
- Michael Mignone – assistant engineer
- Joe Arlotta – additional vocal recording
- Ed Rak – mixing
- Mike Alaire – mix assistant
- François Kervorkian – remixing (1, 2)
- Ron St. Germain – remixing (1, 2)
- Jack Skinner – mastering at Sterling Sound (New York, NY)
- Altamese Alston – album coordinator
- Roy Kohara – art direction
- John O'Brien – design, illustration
- Bret Lopez – photography

== Charts ==
| Chart (1985) | Peak position |
|---|---|
| US Billboard Top Pop Albums | 29 |
| US Billboard Top Black Albums | 1 |
| UK Albums Chart | 42 |

Singles

| Year | Single | Peaks | | | |
| Year | Single | US | US R&B | US Dan | UK |
|---|---|---|---|---|---|
| 1984 | "Solid" | 12 | 1 | 15 | 3 |
| 1985 | "Outta the World" | — | 4 | 4 | — |
| 1985 | "Babies" | — | 29 | — | 56 |

== See also ==
- List of number-one R&B albums of 1985 (U.S.)
