= Found a Cure =

Found a Cure may refer to:

- "Found a Cure" (Ashford & Simpson song), 1979
- "Found a Cure" (Ultra Naté song), 1998
