= Be Mine Tonight =

Be Mine Tonight may refer to:

- Be Mine Tonight (film), a 1932 film directed by Anatole Litvak and starring Jan Kiepura
- Be Mine Tonight, a 2003 album by Dean Roberts
- "Be Mine Tonight" (Th' Dudes song), 1979
- "Be Mine (Tonight)", a song by Grover Washington Jr. from the 1981 album Come Morning
- "Be Mine Tonight" (Neil Diamond song) 1982
- "Be Mine Tonight", a song by Blackmore's Night from the 1997 album Shadow of the Moon
