= Baddest (album) =

Compilation album by Grover Washington Jr.
- Released: February 1981
- Genre: Jazz, R&B
- Label: Motown TMSP 6011
- Producer: Grover Washington, Jr., Creed Taylor

Grover Washington Jr. chronology
Come Morning (1980)	Baddest (1981)	Anthology (1981)

Professional ratings
Review scores
Source	Rating
AllMusic	3/5 stars
The Rolling Stone Jazz Record Guide	2/5 stars

Baddest is a double compilation (1972–1978) album by American jazz musician Grover Washington Jr. The album was released in February 1981 via Motown label. The songs were conducted and arranged by Bob James.

== Reception ==
An editor at Dusty Groove stated "An excellent 2LP set that compiles Grover's killer funky cuts for Kudu – packaged here in an expanded best-of set that Motown issued when they took over the Kudu distribution. We hardly need to tell you how great these cuts are..."

== Track listing ==
Disc 1

1. "It Feels So Good" (Ralph MacDonald, William Salter)
2. "Mister Magic" (Ralph MacDonald)
3. "No Tears, In the End" (Ralph MacDonald, William Salter)
4. "Black Frost" (Bob James, Grover Washington, Jr.)
5. "Do Dat" (Leonard Gibbs)
6. "Summer Song" (Tyrone Brown, John E. Blake, Jr.)

Disc 2

1. "A Secret Place" (Grover Washington, Jr.)
2. "Ain't No Sunshine" (Bill Withers)
3. "Mercy Mercy Me (The Ecology)" (Marvin Gaye)
4. "Inner City Blues (Makes Me Wanna Holler)" (Marvin Gaye, James Nyx)
5. "Lean on Me" (Bill Withers)
6. "Masterpiece" (Norman Whitfield)

== Charts ==
Chart (1980)	Peak position
US Billboard Pop Albums	96
