= Come Morning (album) =

Studio album by Grover Washington Jr.
- Released: 1981
- Recorded: June–September 1981
- Studio: Rosebud Recording Inc. (New York, NY).
- Genre: Jazz, R&B
- Length: 40:18
- Label: Elektra K 52337
- Producer: Grover Washington, Jr., Ralph MacDonald

Grover Washington Jr. chronology
Winelight (1980)	Come Morning (1981)	Baddest (1981)

Come Morning is a studio album by American jazz musician Grover Washington Jr. The album was released in 1981 via Elektra label.

== Reception ==
Professional ratings
Review scores
Source	Rating
AllMusic	2/5 stars
The Rolling Stone Jazz & Blues Album Guide	2/5 stars

Michael Erlewine of AllMusic commented: "Background singers, synthesizers. This is more programmed mood music than jazz. Smooth and nice. Gold album".

== Track listing ==
No.	Title	Writer(s)	Length
1.	"East River Drive"	Grover Washington, Jr.	4:44
2.	"Come Morning"	Grover Washington, Jr.	4:57
3.	"Be Mine (Tonight)" (Lead Vocals – Grady Tate)	Ralph MacDonald, William Eaton, William Salter	6:38
4.	"Reaching Out"	Grover Washington, Jr.	4:08
5.	"Jamming"	Bob Marley	5:05
6.	"Little Black Samba" (Lead Vocals – Grady Tate)	Ralph MacDonald, William Eaton, William Salter	5:42
7.	"Making Love to You"	Grover Washington, Jr.	4:43
8.	"I'm All Yours"	Richard Tee, Stephen Gadd	4:43
Total length:			40:18

== Personnel ==
- Grover Washington, Jr. – saxophones
- Richard Tee – Fender Rhodes
- Paul Griffin – synthesizers
- Eric Gale – guitars
- Marcus Miller – bass
- Steve Gadd – drums
- Ralph MacDonald – congas, percussion
- Grady Tate – lead vocals (3, 6)
- William Eaton – arrangements and conductor, backing vocals (3, 4, 5)
- Vivian Cherry – backing vocals (3, 4, 5)
- Frank Floyd – backing vocals (3, 4, 5)
- Yvonne Lewis – backing vocals (3, 4, 5)
- Ullanda McCullough – backing vocals (3, 4, 5)
- Zack Sanders – backing vocals (3, 4, 5)

== Production ==
- Grover Washington, Jr. – producer, mixing
- Ralph MacDonald – producer, mixing
- Richard Alderson – engineer, mixing
- Kendall Brown – assistant engineer
- Eddie Heath – assistant engineer
- Lamont Moreno – assistant engineer
- Anthony MacDonald – assistant engineer
- Paul Silverthorn – production coordinator
- Ron Coro – art direction
- Norm Ung – art direction
- Denise Minobe – design
- Jim Shea – photography

== Charts ==
Chart (1980–81)	Peak position
US Billboard Pop Albums	28
