= Live at The Bijou =

Live at the Bijou

Live album by Grover Washington Jr.
- Released: December 1977
- Recorded: May 1977
- Venue: Bijou Cafe, Philadelphia, Pennsylvania
- Genre: Jazz
- Length: 76:25
- Label: Kudu Records
- Producer: Creed Taylor

Grover Washington Jr. chronology
A Secret Place (1976)	Live at the Bijou (1977)	Reed Seed (1978)

Live at the Bijou is a 1977 live album by jazz saxophonist Grover Washington Jr. It was released via Kudu Records label.

== Reception ==
Professional ratings
Review scores
Source	Rating
Allmusic	3.5/5 stars
The Rolling Stone Jazz & Blues Album Guide	2/5 stars
The Penguin Guide to Jazz Recordings	3/4 stars

Recorded live in May 1977 at the Bijou Cafe in Philadelphia, Pennsylvania. Released as a double album in late 1977, this album would chart number one on the Jazz albums chart and number four on the Soul album charts. From the album the single "Summer Song" / "Juffure" was released on March 1, 1978, and reached #57 in the R&B charts. This would be Grover's last album produced by Creed Taylor. A reviewer at Dusty Groove stated "A totally great Grover Washington record – and with 25 years behind us, we really now realize how fantastic all the early Kudu sessions really were! The record was recorded live at the Bijou, and is spread out over 2 long LPs, with lots of room for tasty open-ended solos by Grover and the group".

== Track listing ==
1. "On The Cusp" (Richard Steacker) - 6:15
2. "You Make Me Dance" (Tyrone Brown) - 5:41
3. "Lock It in the Pocket" (Richard Steacker) - 6:50
4. "Days in Our Lives" (James Simmons) - 7:44
5. "Mr. Magic" (Ralph MacDonald, William Salter) - 12:24
6. "Summer Song" (John Blake) - 7:30
7. "Juffure" (Millard Vinson) - 9:30
8. "Sausalito" (James Simmons, John Blake Jr., Leonard "Doc" Gibbs Jr., Leslie Burrs, Richard Steacker, Tyrone Brown) - 9:51
9. "Funkfoot" (John Blake) - 8:31

== Personnel ==
- Grover Washington Jr. – alto saxophone, soprano saxophone, tenor saxophone
- James "Sid" Simmons – keyboards
- Richard Lee Steacker – guitars
- Tyrone Brown – bass
- Millard "Pete" Vinson – drums
- Leonard "Doc" Gibbs – percussion
- Leslie Burrs – flute
- John Blake Jr. – electric violin
- Alan Blake – vocals
- Lita Blake – vocals

== Production ==
- Creed Taylor – producer
- Dale Ashby – recording
- Dave Palmer – engineer
- Joel Cohn – assistant engineer
- Joe Gastwirt – mastering
- Sib Chalawick – art direction, design
- Bernie Block – photography
- White Gate – photography

Studios

- Additional recording by Dale Ashby and Father Mobile Recording Truck (Basking Ridge, NJ).
- Mixed at Electric Lady Studios (New York, NY).
- Mastered at Masterdisk (New York, NY).

== Charts ==
Chart (1978)	Peak position
Billboard Pop Albums	11
Billboard Top Soul Albums	4
Billboard Top Jazz Albums	1

=== Singles ===
Year	Single	Chart positions
Year	Single	US R&B
1978	"Summer Song"	57
