= Skylarkin' (Grover Washington Jr. album) =

Studio album by Grover Washington Jr.
- Released: 1980
- Recorded: October 1979
- Studios: Rosebud Recording, New York City, New York
- Genre: Jazz
- Length: 36:00
- Label: Motown
- Producer: Grover Washington Jr.

Grover Washington Jr. chronology
Paradise (1979)	Skylarkin' (1980)	Winelight (1980)

Skylarkin' is a 1980 studio album by American jazz saxophonist Grover Washington Jr. The record was released via Motown Records.

== Critical reception ==
Professional ratings
Review scores
Source	Rating
AllMusic	2/5 stars
The Rolling Stone Jazz Record Guide	2/5 stars
DownBeat	4/5 stars

The Globe and Mail wrote: "A highly commercial venture, as much of Washington's music has been ... it sounds like any number of elevators, even though Washington plays well within the music's severe confines."

== Track listing ==
1. "Easy Loving You" - 7:17
2. "Bright Moments" (Roland Kirk) - 6:25
3. "Snake Eyes" - 4:25
4. "I Can't Help It" (Stevie Wonder, Susaye Greene) - 6:26
5. "Love" (Ralph MacDonald, William Salter, David Stevens) - 5:18
6. "Open Up Your Mind (Wide)" (Ronnie Wilson, Charlie Wilson) - 6:06

All tunes written by Grover Washington Jr. except as noted parenthetically above.

== Personnel ==
Band

- Grover Washington Jr. – soprano saxophone, tenor saxophone, baritone saxophone, flute, Prophet-5, ocarina, arrangements (1, 2, 3)
- Richard Tee – acoustic piano, electric piano
- Eric Gale – guitars
- Marcus Miller – bass
- Idris Muhammad – drums
- Ralph MacDonald – percussion, Syndrums

Additional musicians

- Jon Faddis – flugelhorn (1)
- Alex Otey – trumpet (1)
- Jorge Dalto – acoustic piano solo (2)
- Paul Griffin – clavinet (3)
- Ed Walsh – Oberheim Eight Voice synthesizer (4)
- William Eaton – arrangements (4, 5, 6), conductor

== Production ==
- Grover Washington Jr. – producer
- Richard Alderson – engineer
- Ed Heath – assistant engineer
- Anthony MacDonald – assistant engineer
- Lamont Moreno – assistant engineer
- George Marino – original mastering at Sterling Sound (New York, NY).
- John Matousek – CD mastering at Masterworks (Hollywood, CA).
- Scott Charles – production coordination
- Ginny Livingston – art direction, design
- John Cabalka – art direction, design
- Bill Imhoff – cover illustration

== Charts ==
Chart (1980)	Peak position
US Billboard Pop Albums	24
US Billboard Top Jazz Albums	1
US Billboard Top Soul Albums	8

=== Singles ===
Year	Single	Chart positions
Year	Single	US R&B
1980	"Snake Eyes"	88
