= Reed Seed =

Studio album by Grover Washington Jr.
- Released: 1978
- Recorded: 1978
- Studio: Ridge Sound Studio, Philadelphia, Pennsylvania
- Genre: Jazz
- Length: 39:41
- Label: Motown
- Producer: Grover Washington Jr.

Grover Washington Jr. chronology
Live at The Bijou (1977)	Reed Seed (1978)	Paradise (1979)

Reed Seed is the seventh studio album by the American jazz saxophonist Grover Washington Jr. It was released in 1978 on the Motown label.

Professional ratings
Review scores
Source	Rating
AllMusic	3.5/5 stars
The Rolling Stone Jazz Record Guide	2/5 stars

== Track listing ==
1. "Do Dat" (John E. Blake Jr., Leonard "Doc" Gibbs Jr.) - 4:27
2. "Step'n' Thru" (Richard Lee Steacker) - 6:15
3. "Reed Seed (Trio Tune)" (Grover Washington Jr.) - 4:54
4. "Maracas Beach" (James "Sid" Simmons) - 4:48
5. "Santa Cruzin" (John E. Blake Jr., Tyrone Brown, Leonard "Doc" Gibbs Jr., James "Sid" Simmons, Richard Lee Steacker, Millard "Pete" Vinson, Grover Washington Jr.) - 6:54
6. "Just the Way You Are" (Billy Joel) - 4:46
7. "Loran's Dance" (Grover Washington Jr.) - 7:37

== Personnel ==
- Grover Washington Jr. – soprano saxophone, alto saxophone, tenor saxophone, baritone saxophone, flute, arrangements (1, 2, 3, 5, 6, 7)
- James "Sid" Simmons – acoustic piano, Fender Rhodes, clavinet, arrangements (4, 5)
- John Blake Jr. – Polymoog, ARP Omni, ARP String Ensemble, electric violin, acoustic piano (1), clavinet (1), Fender Rhodes (6), backing vocals, arrangements (1, 5)
- Richard Lee Steacker – electric guitars, backing vocals, arrangements (2)
- Tyrone Brown – acoustic bass, electric bass
- Millard "Pete" Vinson – drums
- Leonard "Doc" Gibbs – percussion, backing vocals, arrangements (1, 5)
- Derrick Graves – arrangements (2)
- Jeannine Otis – backing vocals
- Lita Boggs – backing vocals
- Rita Boggs – backing vocals, vocal arrangements (1)

== Production ==
- Grover Washington Jr. – producer
- Nils Salminen – engineer
- Rodney Perry – assistant engineer
- Rudy Van Gelder – mastering at Van Gelder Studios (Englewood Cliffs, New Jersey).
- Norm Ung – art direction, design
- Beverly Parker – photography

== Charts ==
Chart (1978)	Peak position
Billboard Pop Albums	35
Billboard Top Soul Albums	7
Billboard Top Jazz Albums	1

=== Singles ===
Year	Single	Chart positions
Year	Single	US R&B
1979	"Do Dat"	79
