= Paradise (Grover Washington Jr. album) =

Studio album by Grover Washington Jr.
- Released: 1979
- Recorded: 1979
- Studio: Alpha International, Philadelphia, Pennsylvania
- Genre: Jazz
- Length: 40:58
- Label: Elektra
- Producer: Grover Washington Jr.

Grover Washington Jr. chronology
Reed Seed (1978)	Paradise (1979)	Skylarkin' (1980)

Paradise is the eighth studio album by jazz musician Grover Washington Jr. Released in 1979, it was Washington's first album on Elektra Records.

== Critical reception ==
Professional ratings
Review scores
Source	Rating
AllMusic	2.5/5 stars
The Penguin Guide to Jazz Recordings	3.5/4 stars
The Rolling Stone Jazz Record Guide	2/5 stars

The Bay State Banner wrote that "Washington has let the abysmal vocalists go and gone back to robust, rough alto and soprano sax blowing."

== Track listing ==
All tracks composed by Grover Washington Jr.; except where indicated.

1. "Paradise" (John Blake) - 7:55
2. "Icey" (Millard Vinson) - 3:48
3. "The Answer in Your Eyes" (Washington, Richard Steacker) - 8:24
4. "Asia's Theme" (James Simmons) - 5:03
5. "Shana" - 5:06
6. "Tell Me About It Now" - 5:27
7. "Feel It Comin'" (Richard Steacker) - 5:15

== Personnel ==
- Grover Washington Jr. – soprano saxophone, tenor saxophone, baritone saxophone, flute, arrangements (3, 5, 6, 7), electric piano (7)
- James "Sid" Simmons – acoustic piano, electric piano, arrangements (2, 4)
- Richard Lee Steacker – acoustic guitar, electric guitar, arrangements (3)
- Tyrone Brown – acoustic bass, electric bass
- Millard "Pete" Vinson – drums, Syndrums
- Leonard "Doc" Gibbs – assorted percussions
- John Blake Jr. – violin, arrangements (1)

== Production ==
- Grover Washington, Jr. – producer
- Fred Galletti – engineer
- Al Alberts, Jr. – assistant engineer
- Frank Bernardini – assistant engineer
- Mike Bonghi – assistant engineer
- Jerry Williamson – assistant engineer
- Rudy Van Gelder – mastering at Van Gelder Studios (Englewood Cliffs, NJ).
- Ron Coro – art direction
- Johnny Lee – art direction
- John Collier – illustration
- Paul Wilson – photography

== Charts ==
Chart (1979)	Peak position
Billboard Pop Albums	24
Billboard Top Soul Albums	15
Billboard Top Jazz Albums	2

=== Singles ===
Year	Single	Chart positions
Year	Single	US R&B
1979	"Tell Me About It Now"	57
