= Otay =

Otay may refer to:

== Locations ==
- Otay Centenario
- Otay Mesa Detention Center
- Otay Mesa, San Diego
- Otay Mesa Port of Entry
- Otay Mesa West, San Diego
- Otay Ranch High School
- Otay Ranch Town Center
- Otay River
- Lower Otay Reservoir
- Rancho Otay

== See also ==
- Otey (disambiguation)
