= Aria (Grover Washington Jr. album) =

Studio album by Grover Washington Jr.
- Released: March 7, 2000
- Recorded: May 5–6, 1999
- Studio: Giandomenico Studios (NJ), Sony Music Studios (NYC)
- Genre: Jazz, classical
- Length: 59:40
- Label: Sony Classical SK 61864
- Producer: Grover Washington, Jr., Robert Freedman

Grover Washington Jr. chronology
Breath of Heaven: A Holiday Collection (1997)	Aria (2000)

Professional ratings
Review scores
Source	Rating
Allmusic	3/5 stars
The Penguin Guide to Jazz Recordings	3/4 stars

Aria is the final studio album by American jazz musician Grover Washington Jr. It was released posthumously on March 7, 2000, via Sony Classical label. The album consists of 12 jazz covers of classical arias by famous composers (Giacomo Puccini, Georges Bizet, and others).

== Recording ==
The album was recorded May 5 and 6, 1999 at Giandomenico Studios in Collingswood, New Jersey and Sony Music Studios in New York City, several months before Washington's death on December 17, 1999. To record the album, Washington joined forces with the Orchestra of St. Luke's along with Ron Carter on bass, and Billy Childs and Robert Freedman on piano.

== Reception ==
Jonathan Widran of AllMusic stated "Performing here on soprano, alto, tenor, and baritone saxes, he draws upon his artistry as a melodist to capture the emotional spirit of a dozen of opera's most beautiful arias... all with a sensibility that is very much of our day. The Orchestra of St. Lukes is most effective wrapping its lushness around the tenor on a dramatic rendering of Puccini's "Donna Non Vidi Mai." Bassist Ron Carter and pianist Billy Childs complete a beautiful trio. This isn't Grover at his most inventive or exciting, but like everything he did, it's full of pure heart".

== Track listing ==
No.	Title	Writer(s)	Length
1.	"Je crois entendre encore"	Georges Bizet	4:01
2.	"Pourquoi me reveiller?"	Jules Massenet	5:11
3.	"Flower Duet"	Léo Delibes	7:06
4.	"Amor ti vieta"	Umberto Giordano	4:51
5.	"O mio babbino caro"	Giacomo Puccini	4:04
6.	"Donna non vidi mai"	Giacomo Puccini	3:51
7.	"Ch'ella mi creda"	Giacomo Puccini	4:54
8.	"My Man's Gone Now"	George Gershwin	5:39
9.	"O soave fanciulla"	Giacomo Puccini	5:33
10.	"E lucevan le stelle"	Giacomo Puccini	4:38
11.	"Au fond du temple saint"	Georges Bizet	6:08
12.	"Vissi d'arte"	Giacomo Puccini	3:52
Total length:			59:40

== Personnel ==
- Grover Washington Jr. – saxophone (soprano, tenor, baritone, alto)
- Ron Carter – bass (tracks: 1–12)
- Robert Freedman – conductor (tracks: 1–3, 5–7, 9–12), piano (tracks: 4, 8)
- Orchestra of St. Luke's (tracks: 1–3, 5–7, 9–12)
- Billy Childs – piano (tracks: 1–3, 5–7, 9–12)
