= Miss Amy =

American singer-songwriter

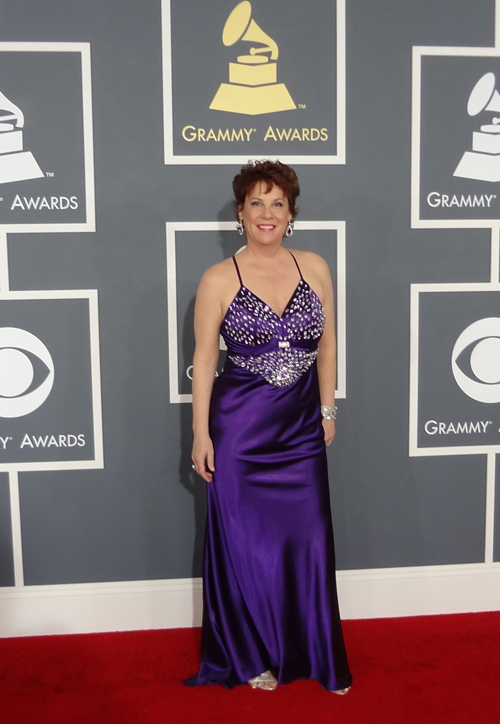
- Miss Amy on the Red Carpet at the 54th Grammy Awards, 2012

Background information
- Also known as: Amy Otey
- Born: Age 64; Charleston, South Carolina, United States
- Genres: Children's music, Americana, country, folk-rock, pop, alternative jazz
- Occupations: Singer-songwriter, author, performer
- Instruments: Vocals, guitar
- Years active: 1990s–present
- Labels: Ionian Productions, Inc. WinterCat Records, LLC
- Website: https://MissAmy.tv https://WinterCatRecords.com https://WinterCatCreative.com

Amy Otey (1962‒ ),^{[1]} known as Miss Amy^{[2]} is an American musical fitness entertainer, singer-songwriter, and author focusing on the themes of health and activity for children, though her genres also range to country, folk-rock and pop.^{[1]}^{[3]}^{[4]} With her husband, award-winning vocalist/multi-instrumental musician & producer Alex Otey, she has released 5 children’s albums,^{[5]} the fifth of which, Fitness Rock & Roll, was nominated in the 54th Grammy Awards. Miss Amy also appears on the 53rd Grammy-nominated album Healthy Food For Thought: Good Enough To Eat, and the 54th Grammy-winning album, All About Bullies... Big And Small.^{[6]} Her book, Keep Kids Fit! Classroom Activity Breaks was released in 2013 by Open Door Publications.^{[7]} Amy co-owns WinterCat Records, LLC with her husband Alex. In addition, Amy is the Senior Writer for WinterCatCreative (est 2019) producing scripts for film and television.

== Early life, education ==
Amy was raised in suburban Kansas City.^{[8]} After she met her husband, music producer Alex Otey, they began playing in jazz, folk and rock bands together.^{[8]}

She earned her BBA^{[8]} in Strategic Management at the University of North Texas, her Certificate of Gerontology at Rutgers University^{[9]}, and in 2023 her Film and Television Essentials Certificate in partnership with TISCH/NYU through Yellowbrick.

As a fitness instructor since her 20s, she has been accredited for Kids & Teen Fitness, Yoga I & II, Pilates, Tai-Chi, Strength Training, Primary Aerobics and Pre/Post Natal Fitness. She is also a certified Youth/Adolescent Fitness Trainer^{[9]} and a specialist in older adult fitness and currently teaches that population.

== Music career ==
=== Early years ===
"I realized early on that children are kinesthetic beings. They can't help but express themselves through movement. What I do is to give direction in a musical context, so they can not only better express themselves, but learn foundational fitness at the same time."
— Miss Amy

Amy’s career in children's music began in the mid-1990s in New Jersey^{[8]}, when her first son was born prematurely. She made up songs to sing for him while he was in the hospital's neonatal unit, something she continued doing in his early years. She has stated that "Having a child with severe health needs really changed our family situation and my musical focus. It became all about raising a healthy child."^{[10]}

After her first son began thriving, she became active in a local mom's group singing with moms and their children at gatherings. She was soon asked to provide entertainment at libraries, holiday events and birthday parties.^{[10]} She then trained as a children's music instructor, and began to develop her interactive program. She also continued training in Kids & Teen Fitness, Primary Aerobics, Yoga and Tai-Chi.^{[10]}

Miss Amy was the moniker given to her by students when she first started teaching.^{[8]} Her programs focus on the ABCs of fitness skills; agility, balance, and coordination.^{[8]}

After becoming a President's Challenge Advocate in 2007,^{[11]} she was named President's Challenge All-American for September 2010 by the President's Challenge Program.^{[11]}^{[12]}

Miss Amy & Her Big Kids Band
- Origin: New Jersey
- Genres: Children's music, Americana, country, folk-rock, pop
- Years active: 2004–2019
- Members: Miss Amy; Alex Otey; Glasvegas; Chris Clark; James Popik
- Website: https://MissAmy.tv

=== Miss Amy and Her Big Kids' Band ===
Miss Amy frequently plays live with Miss Amy & Her Big Kids' Band. The members have each earned their President's Active Life Style Awards and are experienced musicians who have performed rock, jazz, funk and classical music.

Current members

- Miss Amy – vocals, guitar
- Alex Otey – trumpet, keyboard, vocals
- Ryan Ross – percussion
- Chris Clark – double bass, etc.
- James Popik – electric guitar, etc.

=== Solo releases ===
As a singer-songwriter Miss Amy released 5 LPs, starting with Underwater in 2004.^{[5]} She typically writes both words and music, then arranges and adds instruments with her husband producer/musician Alex Otey.^{[8]} Her albums have been nominated for several Grammy awards. In late 2010 Healthy Food For Thought, which features her two spoken word pieces, "Bananas" and "Imagine a Garden,"^{[13]} was nominated for a 53rd Grammy Award in the "Children's Best Spoken Word" category.^{[14]}

Miss Amy performed as part of the White House 2010 Egg Roll event on April 5, 2010, where the theme was based on the Let's Move! initiative of First Lady Michelle Obama.^{[15]} Other performers at the 2010 White House Egg Roll event included Justin Bieber,^{[4]} J.K. Rowling, and the cast from Glee.^{[15]} Miss Amy also headlined Kidstock 2010.^{[3]}

2011's Miss Amy's Fitness Rock & Roll was produced by her husband and co-creator, Alex, and released on his label, Ionian Productions. The album features James Popik on guitar and vocals, Chris Clark on bass, Andy Janowiak and Rick Vinet on percussion, saxophonists Richie Cole and Tom Verde, and brass player Lars Wendt.^{[6]}

In November 2011 Fitness Rock & Roll was nominated for a 54th Grammy Award in the category of "Best Children's Album." That year Miss Amy also appeared on the Grammy-winning album All About Bullies... Big And Small.^{[6]} By December 2011 she had won The Lehigh Valley Music Award's "Best Children's Performer."^{[6]} She has appeared on television spots such as NBC 10!,^{[13]} and in March 2013 Shine On Hollywood Magazine presented her as one of the "Top Women Entertainment Industry Professionals."^{[8]} She and her husband Alex appeared together in music in Origin Magazine in 2013.

=== Off The Map ===
In 2013 she released Angels Riding Shotgun, the debut album of the Americana rock band Off the Map With Miss Amy.^{[16]} Amy remains an active member of the National Academy of Recording Arts & Sciences.

== Personal life ==
Miss Amy continues to live in New Jersey, with her family.^{[4]}^{[17]}

== Discography ==
=== Miss Amy and Her Big Kids Band ===
- Underwater (2004)
- Wide Wide World (2005)
- My Precious One (2006)
- I Wanna Know How It Works! (2007)
- Fitness Rock & Roll (2010)

=== Off the Map with Miss Amy ===
- Angels Riding Shotgun (2013)

=== Compilations ===
- WXPN's Kids' Corner 20th Anniversary Compilation (2008)
- Wildflower Compilation (2010)
- Healthy Food For Thought, Good Enough to Eat (2010)
- All About Bullies... Big And Small Compilation (2011)
- Move This World (2013)

=== DVDs ===
- International Baby 101 DVD (2003)

=== Co-Producer/Background Vocals ===
Co-Producer for Artist Alex Otey on the WinterCat Records, LLC Label

- When I See Your Face (single), Alex Otey Trio (2017)
- Love Matters Now (Album), Alex Otey Trio (2017)
- Love Matters More (single), Alex Otey Trio (2018)
- Signs (EP), Alex Otey (2020)
- See the Light (single), Alex Otey Trio (2021)
- Define Yourself, Alex Otey (2023)
- Humanity Theory (Album), Alex Otey (2024)
- Darwin AI: Survivor Choice (Album), Alex Otey (2025)

== Grammy Awards ==
Year	Song/album	Category	Role	Result
2011	Healthy Food For Thought, Good Enough to Eat	Grammy Award for Best Spoken Word Album for Children	Vocals, lyrics, instrumentals, songwriting	Nominated
2012	Miss Amy's Fitness Rock & Roll	Grammy Award for Best Children's Album	Vocals, lyrics, instrumentals, songwriting	Nominated
2012	All About Bullies... Big and Small	Grammy Award for Best Children's Album	Participating artist, vocals	Winner

== Publishing history ==
- Keep Kids Fit! Classroom Activity Breaks Volume 1 Fitness Rock & Roll (2013, Open Door Publications)^{[7]}
