= Solid (Ashford & Simpson song) =

Single by Ashford & Simpson

from the album Solid
- B-side: "Solid" (dub version) (US) "Cherish Forever More" (South Africa)
- Released: September 1984
- Recorded: 1984
- Genre: R&B; soul; boogie
- Length: 5:12 (album version); 3:46 (single version); 3:21 (radio edit)
- Label: Capitol
- Songwriters: Nickolas Ashford; Valerie Simpson
- Producers: Nickolas Ashford; Valerie Simpson

Ashford & Simpson singles chronology
| "I'm Not That Tough" (1984) | "Solid" (1984) | "Babies" (1985) |

Official video
- "Solid" on YouTube

"Solid" is a song recorded by American husband-and-wife songwriting duo Ashford & Simpson, released in September 1984 as the first single from their eleventh studio album, Solid (1984). It peaked at number one on the US Billboard soul chart and number 12 on the Billboard Hot 100 chart, as well as the top five in several countries including Canada, Ireland, Germany and the UK in early 1985.

== Background ==
The song was written by the duo and follows a similar template of most of their hits for other artists, except with a slight 1980s inflection to the music. In the lyrics, the narrators of the song celebrate the fact that, through all the difficulties and problems their relationship has faced, they made their love stronger by learning how to forgive and trust each other, and their love for one another remains "solid as a rock".

== Music video ==
The accompanying music video for "Solid" is set in a park on a rainy afternoon. Valerie Simpson exits a taxi in a park on a cloudy day, and escapes from a sudden downpour underneath a bridge. As she sings the opening of the song a cappella, Nick Ashford arrives and joins in. As the video progresses, they are joined by others, including a cyclist in yellow spandex, a gang who just want to sing, and several bongo players, also trying to escape the downpour. It was shot in New York City in Central Park at the Willowdell Arch (40°46′12″N 73°58′16.4″W).

== Personnel ==
- Nickolas Ashford – vocals, backing vocals
- Valerie Simpson – vocals, backing vocals, synthesizers
- Ed Walsh – synthesizer programming
- Sid McGinnis – guitars
- Francisco Centeno – bass
- Chris Parker – drums
- Jimmy Simpson – percussion
- Vinny Della Rocca – saxophone
- Joe Mosello – trumpet
- Ray Simpson – backing vocals
- Ullanda McCullough – backing vocals

== Charts ==
=== Weekly charts ===
Weekly chart performance for "Solid"
| Chart (1984/1985) | Peak position |
|---|---|
| Australia (Kent Music Report) | 21 |
| Austria (Ö3 Austria Top 40) | 4 |
| Belgium (Ultratop 50 Flanders) | 2 |
| Canada Top Singles (RPM) | 5 |
| Europe (European Top 100 Singles) | 5 |
| Finland (Suomen virallinen lista) | 10 |
| Ireland (IRMA) | 3 |
| Netherlands (Dutch Top 40) | 3 |
| Netherlands (Single Top 100) | 3 |
| New Zealand (Recorded Music NZ) | 1 |
| Sweden (Sverigetopplistan) | 13 |
| Switzerland (Schweizer Hitparade) | 3 |
| UK Singles (Official Charts) | 3 |
| US Billboard Hot 100 | 12 |
| US Adult Contemporary (Billboard) | 34 |
| US Dance/Disco (Billboard) | 15 |
| US Hot Black Singles (Billboard) | 1 |
| West Germany (GfK) | 2 |

=== Year-end charts ===
Year-end chart performance for "Solid"
| Chart (1985) | Position |
|---|---|
| Austria (Ö3 Austria Top 40) | 16 |
| Belgium (Ultratop) | 39 |
| Canada Top Singles (RPM) | 52 |
| Netherlands (Dutch Top 40) | 46 |
| Netherlands (Single Top 100) | 37 |
| New Zealand (Recorded Music NZ) | 27 |
| UK Singles (OCC) | 18 |
| US Billboard Hot 100 | 80 |
| West Germany (Official German Charts) | 19 |

== In other media ==
- The song was featured during the closing credits of the 208th episode of Santa Barbara from May 20, 1985.
- The song features in the UK sitcom Peep Show episode "Wedding" first shown in the UK in 2004. One of the main characters, Jez, marries Nancy in order for her to remain in the country. During the episode Jez is forced to dance his first dance alone as Nancy is called away for a job interview, that first song being "Solid".
- The song also featured in an episode of the sitcom Arrested Development, where it is ironically played at the opening ceremony of a new house, which is almost instantaneously knocked down.
- In 2009, Ashford & Simpson remade the song in honor of President Barack Obama, calling it "Solid (As Barack)".
- Featured in the 2010 Nickelodeon film Fred: The Movie as one of Fred's daydreams, with vocals by Pixie Lott.
- The song was the theme song to The Upshaws, which premiered in 2021.
