= Anthology (Grover Washington Jr. album) =

Compilation album by Grover Washington Jr.
- Released: 1981
- Genre: Jazz
- Length: 1:17:17
- Label: Motown M9-961A2
- Producer: Creed Taylor, Grover Washington Jr.

Grover Washington Jr. chronology
Baddest (1981)	Anthology (1981)	The Best Is Yet to Come (1982)

Professional ratings
Review scores
Source	Rating
Allmusic	3/5 stars
The Rolling Stone Jazz Record Guide	2.5/5 stars

Anthology is a 1981 compilation double album by American jazz musician Grover Washington Jr. released via Motown label.

== Reception ==
A reviewer of Dusty Groove noted "A tasty 2LP set that brings together some of the best soul jazz tracks from Grover's years at the Kudu label! As is well remembered by beatheads, Grover had an amazing style at the time – a snakey electric groove that was perfect for the sounds of the early 70s – playing soprano sax in a spare yet funky way, working perfectly with arrangements by Bob James, and some killer bass and drum riffs that are forever being sampled and re-discovered today!"

== Track listing ==
Disc One

1. "Inner City Blues (Make Me Wanna Holler)" (James Nyx, Marvin Gaye)
2. "Mercy Mercy Me (The Ecology)" (Marvin Gaye)
3. "Where Is The Love" (Ralph MacDonald, William Salter)
4. "Mister Magic" (Ralph MacDonald)
5. "It Feels So Good" (Ralph MacDonald, William Salter)
6. "A Secret Place" (Grover Washington, Jr.)

Disc Two

1. "Masterpiece" (Norman Whitfield)
2. "Trouble Man" (Marvin Gaye)
3. "Summer Song" (John E. Blake, Jr., Tyrone Brown)
4. "Santa Cruzin'" (Grover Washington, Jr., J. Blake, Jr., J. Simmons, L. Gibbs, Jr., R.L. Steacker, T. Brown)
5. "Snake Eyes" (Grover Washington, Jr.)

== Charts ==
Chart (1981)	Peak position
US Billboard Pop Albums	149
