= Feels So Good (Grover Washington Jr. album) =

Studio album by Grover Washington Jr.
- Released: 1975
- Recorded: May & July 1975
- Studio: Van Gelder Studio, Englewood Cliffs
- Genre: Jazz; Jazz Fusion; Smooth Jazz
- Length: 37:07
- Label: Kudu Records; KU-24
- Producer: Creed Taylor

Grover Washington Jr. chronology
Mister Magic (1975)	Feels So Good (1975)	A Secret Place (1976)

Professional ratings
Review scores
Source	Rating
Allmusic	4/5 stars
Jazzwise	3/5 stars
The Rolling Stone Jazz Record Guide	2/5 stars
The Penguin Guide to Jazz Recordings	2.5/4 stars

Feels So Good is the fifth album by jazz saxophonist Grover Washington Jr., recorded and released in 1975. The album topped both the soul and jazz albums charts and peaked at number ten on the pop album charts in the U.S.

== Reception ==
Jason Ankeny of AllMusic stated "The aptly titled and much-sampled Feels So Good represents the creative apex of Grover Washington, Jr.'s sublime electric funk sound. Its shimmering, soulful grooves refute the argument that smooth jazz is little more than mere ambience, combining expert playing and intricate songwriting to create music that is both compelling and comforting. Arranger Bob James is in top form here, creating the spacious, rich milieus that are his trademark, but regardless of the name above the title, bassist Louis Johnson is the real star of the show. His supple rhythms percolate like coffee, adding oomph to the bottom of highlights "It Feels So Good" and "Hydra" while Washington's cream-and-sugar soprano sax solos soar over the top".

== Track listing ==
1. "The Sea Lion" – (Bob James) – 5:57
2. "Moonstreams" – (Grover Washington Jr.) – 5:55
3. "Knucklehead" – (Washington) – 7:53
4. "It Feels So Good" – (Ralph MacDonald, William Salter) – 8:14
5. "Hydra" – (Washington) – 9:08

== Personnel ==
- Grover Washington Jr. – soprano saxophone, tenor saxophone
- Bob James – acoustic piano, electric piano, synthesizers, arrangements
- Eric Gale – guitars
- Gary King – bass (1, 2, 3)
- Louis Johnson – bass (4, 5)
- Steve Gadd – drums (1, 2)
- Jimmy Madison – drums (3)
- Kenneth "Spider Webb" Rice – drums (4, 5)
- Ralph MacDonald – percussion
- Sid Weinberg – oboe, English horn

Brass Section

- Alan Raph and Dave Taylor – bass trombone
- Barry Rogers – trombone
- Randy Brecker, Jon Faddis, John Frosk and Bob Millikan – trumpet, flugelhorn

String Section

- Seymour Barab and Charles McCracken – cello
- Alfred Brown and Emanuel Vardi – viola
- Lewis Eley, Max Ellen, Barry Finclair, Emanuel Green, Harry Lookofsky, Guy Lumia, David Nadien and Raoul Poliakin – violin

== Production ==
- Creed Taylor – producer
- Rudy Van Gelder – engineer
- Rene Schumacher – design
- Alen MacWeeney – photography

== Charts ==
Chart (1975)	Peak position
Billboard Pop Albums	10
Billboard Top Soul Albums	1
Billboard Top Jazz Albums	1
