= Breath of Heaven: A Holiday Collection =

Compilation album by Grover Washington Jr.
- Released: September 30, 1997
- Studio: Van Gelder Studio (Hackensack, NJ)
- Genre: Jazz
- Length: 59:35
- Label: Columbia CK 68527
- Producer: Donald Robinson; Todd Barkan

Grover Washington Jr. chronology
Soulful Strut (1996)	Breath of Heaven: A Holiday Collection (1997)	Aria (2000)

Professional ratings
Review scores
Source	Rating
Allmusic	3/5 stars
The New York Times	(favourable)
The Penguin Guide to Jazz Recordings	3/4 stars

Breath of Heaven: A Holiday Collection is a Christmas compilation album by Grover Washington Jr., mostly on soprano saxophone, released in 1997 and nominated for a Grammy in 1998. Dawn Andrews contributes vocals and cello. Billy Childs contributes piano. It was also the last album released during his lifetime as he died less than three months later on December 17, 1999. His next album, Aria, was released posthumously on March 7, 2000.

== Reception ==
Scott Yanow of AllMusic commented "For this set of Christmas-related songs, Grover Washington Jr. (mostly on soprano but also contributing some tenor and alto) sounds soulful but restrained. The renditions are lightly funky, atmospheric, and generally quite dull. Billy Childs is excellent on piano, and the musicianship of the other players is fine, but the similarity of moods and grooves, along with the somber feel of most of the music, makes this a surprisingly tedious listen".

== Track listing ==
1. "Have Yourself a Merry Little Christmas" (Ralph Blane, Hugh Martin) – 4:56
2. "Breath of Heaven (Mary's Song)" (Chris Eaton, Amy Grant) – 6:59
3. "The Love in His Infant Eyes" (Donald Robinson, Grover Washington Jr.) – 4:27
4. "Away in a Manger" – 5:56
5. "I Wonder as I Wander" – 5:23
6. "Christmas Time Is Here" (Vince Guaraldi, Lee Mendelson) – 5:04
7. "The Magi's Song/A Child Is Born" (Joe Locke/Thad Jones)– 4:56
8. "Jesu, Joy of Man's Desiring" (Johann Sebastian Bach) – 4:22
9. "The Christmas Song" (Mel Tormé, Robert Wells) – 4:33
10. "The Christmas Waltz" (Sammy Cahn, Jule Styne) – 4:47
11. "Christmas Day Chant" – 3:41
12. "Breath of Heaven (Mary's Song, Instrumental Version)" (Eaton, Grant) – 5:18

== Personnel ==
- Grover Washington Jr. – alto saxophone (1, 3, 4, 8), soprano saxophone (2, 5, 7, 8, 10–12), arrangements (5), tenor saxophone (6, 8, 9)
- Hiram Bullock – keyboards (1), arrangements (1, 9), guitars (2, 6, 12), electric guitar (4, 9), acoustic guitar (5, 10)
- Billy Childs – acoustic piano (1, 2, 5–8, 10, 12), keyboards (4, 9), arrangements (4, 5, 8, 10)
- Joe Locke – keyboards (2, 7, 11, 12), arrangements (2, 6, 7, 11, 12), chimes (5), vibraphone (5, 7, 8, 11), marimba (11)
- Donald Robinson – acoustic piano (3), keyboards (3), arrangements (3)
- Adam Holzman – synthesizers (3)
- Will Lee – bass (1, 2, 4–10, 12)
- Gerald Veasley – bass (3)
- Steven Wolf – drums (1, 3, 4, 9)
- Victor Lewis – drums (2, 5–8, 10, 12
- Pablo Batista – percussion (1, 3, 9)
- Bashiri Johnson – percussion (5, 7)
- Dawn Andrews – cello (2, 11, 12), vocals (11)
- Lisa Fischer – vocals (2)

== Production ==
- Todd Barkan – producer
- Donald Robinson – producer
- Rudy Van Gelder – engineer, mixing, mastering
- Maureen Sickler – assistant engineer
- Paul Silverthorne – production coordinator
- Christine Washington – production coordinator
- Sven Granert – product manager
- Kiku Yamaguchi – art direction
- Alice Butts – design
- David Ellis – illustrations
- Norman Jean Roy – photography
