= Jon Lucien =

British Virgin Islander musical artist (1942–2007)

- Lucien in 1991

Background information
- Born: Lucien Leopold Harrigan; January 8, 1942; Tortola, British Virgin Islands
- Died: August 18, 2007 (aged 65) Orlando, Florida
- Genres: Soul, jazz, funk, R&B, samba, salsa, Caribbean music, South American music, bossa nova
- Occupation: Singer
- Years active: 1960s–2000s
- Labels: RCA Victor, Columbia, Mercury, Shanachie, Sugar Apple Music
- Website: jonlucien.com

Lucien Leopold Harrigan (January 8, 1942 – August 18, 2007), known professionally as Jon Lucien, was a singer from Tortola in the British Virgin Islands.

== Life and career ==
Born in Tortola in 1942, Lucien was raised in St. Thomas. His parents were Eric "Rico" Lucien Harrigan and Eloise Turnbull Harrigan. His father was a musician whose main instrument was a three-coursed Latin guitar-like chordophone known as a Tres. As a teenager, he played bass in his father's band. During the 1960s he moved to New York City. While performing at a party, he was discovered by an executive from RCA Records, which released his debut album (I Am Now, 1970) of pop and jazz standards. Lucien said the label attempted to market him as a "black Sinatra". His second album, Rashida, contained only songs written by Lucien, with "Lady Love" receiving radio airplay. Dave Grusin received a Grammy Award nomination for his arrangements. He recorded two albums for Columbia before making guest appearances on Yesterday's Dreams by Alphonso Johnson and Mr. Gone by Weather Report.

In 1980, Lucien's daughter drowned, and he spent much of the decade struggling with drug addiction. He returned to music with the albums Listen Love (Mercury, 1991) and Mother Nature's Son (Mercury, 1993). Another daughter died in the crash of TWA Flight 800, and Lucien dedicated his album Endless Is Love (1997) to her.

He died of respiratory failure in Orlando, Florida, on August 18, 2007.

== Discography ==
- I Am Now (RCA Victor, 1970)
- Rashida (RCA Victor, 1973)
- Mind's Eye (RCA Victor, 1974)
- Song for My Lady (Columbia, 1975)
- Premonition (Columbia, 1976)
- Romantico (Precision, 1980)
- Inside Moves (Elektra,1984)
- Listen Love (Mercury, 1991)
- Mother Nature's Son (Mercury, 1993)
- Endless Is Love (Shanachie, 1997)
- By Request (Shanachie, 1999)
- Precious Is Love (Love Arts, 1999)
- Man from Paradise (Sugar Apple Music, 2002)
- Live in NYC (Sugar Apple Music, 2003)
- A Time for Love (Sugar Apple Music, 2004)
- The Wayfarer (Sugar Apple Music, 2008)
