= The Best Is Yet to Come (Grover Washington Jr. album) =

Studio album by Grover Washington Jr.
- Released: 1982
- Studio: Group IV Recording Studios, Hollywood, CA; Rosebud Recording Studio, New York, NY; Sigma Sound Studios-Starship One, Philadelphia, PA
- Genre: Jazz
- Length: 39:59
- Label: Elektra 60215
- Producer: Grover Washington, Jr., Ralph MacDonald, Nathan Sassover, Dexter Wansel

Grover Washington Jr. chronology
| Anthology (1981) | The Best Is Yet to Come (1982) | Inside Moves (1984) |

The Best Is Yet to Come is a 1982 studio album by American jazz musician Grover Washington Jr., released via the Elektra label. The album includes his major hit "The Best Is Yet to Come" recorded with Patti LaBelle.

== Critical reception ==
Professional ratings
Review scores
| Source | Rating |
|---|---|
| AllMusic | 3/5 stars |
| The Penguin Guide to Jazz Recordings | 3/4 stars |
| The Rolling Stone Jazz & Blues Album Guide | 2/5 stars |

A reviewer of Billboard wrote "When a musician of unassailable integrity, honesty and commitment makes a bold, adventurous statement about his art, what do you do? You believe him". Ron Wynn of AllMusic stated on "The Best Is Yet to Come", the title cut was a major R&B hit, with Patti Labelle doing vocals. The rest, unfortunately, is formulaic fusion".

== Track listing ==
| No. | Title | Writer(s) | Length |
|---|---|---|---|
| 1. | "Can You Dig It" | Ralph MacDonald, William Salter | 5:17 |
| 2. | "The Best Is Yet to Come" | Cynthia Biggs, Dexter Wansel | 5:58 |
| 3. | "More Than Meets the Eye" | Grover Washington, Jr. | 4:28 |
| 4. | "Things Are Getting Better" | Gerald H. Price | 4:16 |
| 5. | "Mixty Motions" | William Eaton | 5:17 |
| 6. | "Brazilian Memories" | William Eaton | 6:08 |
| 7. | "I'll Be With You" | Grover Washington, Jr. | 4:37 |
| 8. | "Cassie's Theme" | Grover Washington, Jr. | 3:58 |
| Total length: | | | 39:59 |

== Personnel ==
- Grover Washington Jr. – alto saxophone (1), tenor saxophone (2, 6), arrangements (2–4, 7, 8), soprano saxophone (3, 7, 8), saxello (4, 5), synthesizers (7)
- Richard Tee – Fender Rhodes (1, 5, 6), clavinet (6), keyboards (8)
- Paul Griffin – Oberheim OB-Xa (1, 5), synthesizers (6)
- James K. Lloyd – keyboards (2–4, 7), acoustic piano (3, 4)
- Dexter Wansel – Oberheim OB-Xa (2–4), arrangements (2, 7), synthesizers (7)
- Teddi Schlossman – Rhodes electric piano (3)
- Billy Childs – acoustic piano (8), synthesizers (8)
- Eric Gale – guitars (1, 5, 6)
- Herb Smith – guitars (2)
- Richard Steacker – guitars (3, 4, 7)
- Lee Ritenour – guitars (8)
- Marcus Miller – bass (1, 5, 6)
- Cedric A. Napoleon – bass (2–4, 7), lead vocals (7)
- Abraham Laboriel – bass (8)
- Yogi Horton – drums (1, 5, 6)
- Darryl Washington – drums (2–4, 7)
- Harvey Mason – drums (8)
- Ralph MacDonald – percussion (1, 5, 6), bells (2), shaker (2)
- Leonard Gibbs – percussion (3, 4, 7)
- Victor Feldman – percussion (8)
- Kevin Johnson – percussion (8)
- Alex Foster – saxophones (1)
- Frank Wess – saxophones (1)
- Jon Faddis – trumpet (1)
- Mona Goldman-Yoskin – flute (3)
- William Eaton – arrangements (1, 5, 6)
- Cynthia Biggs – arrangements (7)
- Patti LaBelle – lead and backing vocals (2)
- Bobby McFerrin – lead and backing vocals (4)
- Carla L. Benson – backing vocals (7)
- Evette Benton – backing vocals (7)
- Lucille Jones – backing vocals (7)

== Production ==
- Grover Washington Jr. – executive producer, producer, mixing
- Ralph MacDonald – producer (1, 5, 6), mixing
- Dexter Wansel – producer (2, 3, 4, 7)
- Nathan Sassover – producer (8)
- Richard Alderson – engineer (1, 5, 6), mixing
- Kendall Brown – engineer (1, 5, 6), mixing
- Peter Humphreys – engineer (2–4, 7), mixing
- Dennis Sands – engineer (8)
- Eddie Heath – assistant engineer (1, 5, 6)
- Lamont Moreno – assistant engineer (1, 5, 6)
- Barry Craig – assistant engineer (2–4, 7)
- Scott E. MacMinn – assistant engineer (2–4, 7)
- John Wisner – assistant engineer (2–4, 7)
- Greg Orloff – assistant engineer (8)
- Vlado Meller – mastering at CBS Studios (New York, NY).
- Janaire Boger – production coordinator
- Paul Silverthorn – production coordinator
- Ron Coro – art direction, design
- Denise Minobe – art direction, design
- Jim Shea – photography

== Charts ==
| Chart (1984) | Peak position |
|---|---|
| Australia (Kent Music Report) | 100 |
| US Billboard Pop Albums | 50 |

== In popular culture ==
The first track "Can You Dig It" can be heard on the sign-off for Vancouver-based CBC station CBUT in 1986.
