= Send It (album) =

Studio album by Ashford & Simpson
- Released: 1977
- Genre: R&B, soul
- Label: Warner Bros.
- Producer: Nickolas Ashford, Valerie Simpson

Ashford & Simpson chronology
So So Satisfied (1977)	Send It (1977)	Is It Still Good to Ya (1978)

Send It is the fifth album by the American musical duo Ashford & Simpson, released in 1977. They supported it with a North American tour. The album peaked at No. 52 on the Billboard Top LPs & Tape chart.

== Production ==
The songs were arranged by Paul Riser. "Bourgié Bourgié" is an instrumental that incorporates elements of disco.

== Critical reception ==
Professional ratings
Review scores
Source	Rating
All Music Guide to Rock	5/5 stars
Robert Christgau	B
The Encyclopedia of Popular Music	3/5 stars
MusicHound R&B: The Essential Album Guide	2/5 stars
The New Rolling Stone Record Guide	2/5 stars

The New York Daily News called the album "a testimony to their rising recording and producing talents." The Ann Arbor News praised "Top of the Stairs" and "Don't Cost You Nothing" but opined that the album was not "vintage" Ashford & Simpson. The Lincoln Journal Star considered it "pretty tough and funky for contemporary r&b arrangements."

The Windsor Star said that the duo "can suggest drama and tension within the most familiar themes of love". The Globe and Mail concluded that "neither sings very well, and their studio is no longer the place where the good backup musicians hang out."

== Track listing ==
Side 1

1. "By Way of Love's Express"
2. "Let Love Use Me"
3. "Don't Cost You Nothing"
4. "Send It"

Side 2

1. "Top of the Stairs"
2. "Too Bad"
3. "Bourgié Bourgié" (Instrumental)
4. "I Waited Too Long"
