= Soulful Strut (album) =

Studio album by Grover Washington Jr.
- Released: September 1996
- Studio: Various
- Genre: Jazz, R&B
- Length: 51:04
- Label: Columbia CK 57505
- Producer: Gary Haase; Donald Robinson; Dan Shea

Grover Washington Jr. chronology
All My Tomorrows (1994)	Soulful Strut (1996)	Breath of Heaven: A Holiday Collection (1997)

Professional ratings
Review scores
Source	Rating
AllMusic	1.5/5 stars
The Penguin Guide to Jazz Recordings	3/4 stars

Soulful Strut is a studio album by American saxophonist Grover Washington Jr. The album was released in 1996 on Columbia Records label.

== Reception ==
Leo Stanley of AllMusic wrote "Soulful Strut is a typically smooth and swinging date from Grover Washington, Jr. Occasionally, the production by Walter Afanasieff is too slick and commercial, diluting the impact of Washington's subtle, relaxed groove. Fortunately, Washington's instrumental skills cut through the gloss, making Soulful Strut another worthy record for mainstream soul-jazz fans".

== Track listing ==
No.	Title	Writer(s)	Length
1.	"Soulful Strut"	Eugene Record, Sonny Sanders	4:18
2.	"Can You Stop the Rain"	Walter Afanasieff, John Bettis	6:37
3.	"Play That Groove for Me"	Gary Haase	5:02
4.	"Bordertown"	Gary Haase, Grover Washington, Jr.	4:21
5.	"I Can Count the Times"	Grover Washington, Jr., Donald Robinson	5:13
6.	"Village Groove"	Gary Haase, Grover Washington, Jr.	5:07
7.	"Headman's Haunt"	Gary Haase	4:41
8.	"Poacher Man"	Gary Haase	5:07
9.	"Mystical Force"	Grover Washington, Jr., Donald Robinson	5:01
10.	"Uptown"	Gary Haase, Barry Mann, Bob Ward, Barbara Ware	5:38
Total length:			51:04

== Personnel ==
- Grover Washington, Jr. – soprano saxophone (1, 2, 4, 8, 10), alto saxophone (3, 6, 7, 9), tenor saxophone (5, 10), crowd noises (10)
- Dan Shea – keyboards (1, 2), synth bass (1, 2), synthesizer programming (1, 2), MacIntosh programming (1, 2), drum programming (1, 2), rhythm programming (1, 2), arrangements (1, 2)
- George Whitty – keyboards (3, 4, 6), synthesizers (3, 4, 6), horns (3)
- Jimmy Greco – sampling (3)
- Donald Robinson – acoustic piano (5, 9)
- Charlie Ernst – synthesizers (7)
- Adam Holzman – programming (8)
- Peter Schwartz – programming (8)
- Bob Ward – keyboards (10), programming (10), guitars (10)
- Dann Huff – wah guitar (1), electric guitar (2), acoustic guitar (2)
- Ray Obiedo – guitars (1), guitar solo (1)
- Michael Landau – additional electric guitar (2), additional acoustic guitar (2)
- Chris Taylor – guitars (3, 4, 6), electric guitar (7), acoustic guitar (7)
- Randy Bowland – guitars (5, 9)
- Richard Lee Steacker – guitars (5, 9)
- Steve Bargonetti – guitars (6)
- Paul Pimsler – electric guitar (7), guitars (8)
- Gary Haase – bass (3, 4, 6–8, 10), drums (3), arrangements and conductor (3, 4, 6–8, 10), percussion (6), marimba (6), keyboards (7), synth solo (7), programming (8), crowd noises (10)
- Gerald Veasley – bass (5, 9)
- Peter Michael Escovedo – additional drum programming (1), additional rhythm programming (1)
- Steven Wolf – drums (4)
- Richie Morales – drums (5, 9)
- Steve Gadd – drums (6)
- Omar Hakim – drums (7, 8)
- Roger Squitero – congas (3), percussion (4), shaker (10)
- Pablo Batista – congas (5, 9), percussion (5, 7, 9)
- Cyro Baptista – percussion (6)
- Norbert Goldberg – percussion (8)
- Joe Bonadio – congas (10)
- Dale Kelps – alto saxophone (7), alto flute (8, 10), bass clarinet (8, 10)
- Rick Depofi – tenor saxophone (7)
- Aaron Heick – flute (8), saxophone (8)
- Herb Hubel – trombone (7, 8, 10)
- Andy Gravish – trumpet (7)
- Tim Quimette – trumpet (8)
- Mac Gollehon – trumpet (10)
- Jim Powell – muted trumpet (10)
- Walter Afanasieff – arrangements (2)
- Billy Mann – arrangements (10), crowd noises (10)
- Sandy Griffith – backing vocals (2)
- Claytoven Richardson – backing vocals (2)
- Jeanie Tracy – backing vocals (2)
- Wayne Hernandez – vocals (3)
- Amanda Homi – vocals (3)
- Rozz Moorehead – vocals (3)
- Lindiwe Dimani – Zulu vocals (6, 8)
- Bakithi Kumalo – Zulu vocals (6, 8)
- Ntomb'khona Dlamini – Zulu vocals (6, 8)
- Catherine Russell – lead and backing vocals (8)
- Wincy Terry – vocals (10)

== Production ==
- Steve Berkowitz – A&R direction
- Walter Afanasieff – executive producer (1, 2)
- Dan Shea – producer (1, 2), engineer (1, 2)
- Gary Haase – producer (3, 4, 6–8, 10)
- Donald Robinson – producer (5, 9)
- Dana Jon Chappelle – engineer (1, 2), mixing (2)
- David Gleeson – engineer (1, 2)
- Rick Bieder – tracking engineer (3, 4, 6–8, 10)
- Bob Cadway – tracking engineer (3, 4, 6–8, 10), mixing (4, 6, 8, 10)
- Mark Glass – tracking engineer (3, 6, 7), mixing (7)
- Carl Agstadt – engineer (5, 9)
- Glenn Barratt – engineer (5, 9)
- Ron Shaffer – engineer (5, 9)
- Bob Ward – tracking engineer (7, 10)
- Aman Malik – tracking engineer (8)
- John Genna – tracking assistant (3, 4, 6–8, 10)
- Doug McGuirk – tracking assistant (3, 4, 7)
- Andy Tarr – tracking assistant (3, 8)
- Juan Bohorquez – tracking assistant (6, 10)
- Terence Dover – tracking assistant (6–8)
- Dave Scheuer – tracking assistant (6)
- Michael H. Brauer – mixing (1, 3, 5, 9), additional mixing (2)
- Greg Calbi – mastering
- Paul Silverthorn – project coordinator, management
- Christine Washington – project coordinator
- Barbara Stout – production coordinator (1, 2)
- Doreen Manzella – production coordinator (3, 4, 6–8, 10)
- John Pisciotta – production coordinator (3, 4, 6–8, 10)
- Jacie Berry – production coordinator (5, 9)
- Eileen Whelihan – production coordinator (5, 9)
- Julian Peploe – art direction, design
- Norman Jean Roy – photography
- Joseph Oppedisiano – styling
- Barry White – grooming

Studios

- Recorded at WallyWorld Studios (Marin County, California); The Dream Factory, WTM Studios and Current Sounds (New York City); Morningstar Communications (Spring House, Pennsylvania).
- Mixed at Sony Music Studios (New York City); Cove City Sound Studios (Glen Cove, New York); WallyWorld Studios.
- Edited at WTM Studios
- Mastered at Masterdisk (New York City).

== Charts ==
Chart (1996)	Peak position
US Billboard Pop Albums	187
