= Watching You Watching Me =

Studio album by Ullanda McCullough
- Released: 1982
- Recorded: 1982
- Genre: Soul/R&B
- Label: Atlantic
- Producer: Bert DeCouteaux

Ullanda McCullough chronology
Ullanda McCullough (1981)	Watching You Watching Me (1982)

Watching You Watching Me is the third and final studio album by R&B/soul singer/backing vocalist Ullanda McCullough, released in 1982 by Atlantic Records. It features the title cut, written by William Eaton, and a cover version of Carrie Lucas' "Men Kiss and Tell" written by Deniece Williams, Lani Groves and Clarence McDonald. It also features herself, Luther Vandross, Tawatha Agee from the soul/R&B band, Mtume, and her friends providing the background vocals on the album.

== Track listing ==
Side one

1. "Men Kiss and Tell" (Deniece Williams/Lani Groves/Clarence McDonald) – 4:43
2. "Getting Ready for Love" (Howard King/Tawatha Agee) – 5:27
3. "Don't Wanna Let You Go" (John Keller) – 5:41
4. "Try Love for a Change" (Alex Brown/Ron Kersey) – 4:55

Side two

5. "Watching You Watching Me" (William Eaton) – 4:43
6. "What's It All About" (Ullanda McCullough) – 4:38
7. "If It's Time That You Need" (Amanda George) – 4:53
8. "How Is It Done" (Ron Lockhart) – 4:56
