= Mister Magic =

Studio album by Grover Washington Jr.
- Released: February 7, 1975
- Recorded: November 1974
- Studio: Van Gelder, Englewood Cliffs
- Genre: Jazz funk
- Length: 32:51
- Label: Kudu
- Producer: Creed Taylor

Grover Washington Jr. chronology
Soul Box (1973)	Mister Magic (1975)	Feels So Good (1975)

Alternative cover
- Motown Jazz reissue

Mister Magic is the fourth album by jazz saxophonist Grover Washington Jr., released in February 1975. The album topped both the soul and jazz albums chart and peaked at number ten on the pop chart.

== Critical reception ==
Professional ratings
Review scores
Source	Rating
AllMusic	5/5 stars
Christgau's Record Guide	B−
The Penguin Guide to Jazz Recordings	4/4 stars
The Rolling Stone Jazz Record Guide	3.5/5 stars

Reviewing for The Village Voice in 1975, Robert Christgau found the album "functional" and satisfactory for a commercially successful jazz album: "Washington plays a warm tenor in the pop jazz tradition of Gene Ammons, but the rhythm section percolates danceably, and the result is sexy background music only superficially marred by Bob James's strings."

In a retrospective review for AllMusic, Scott Yanow said that it is "one of Grover Washington Jr.'s best-loved recordings and considered a classic of r&bish jazz." He found Washington to be in "particularly creative form" and called James' arrangements "colorful if somewhat commercial".

== Track listing ==
Side one
No.	Title	Writer(s)	Length
1.	"Earth Tones"	Bob James	12:20
2.	"Passion Flower"	Billy Strayhorn, Milt Raskin	5:30

Side two
No.	Title	Writer(s)	Length
1.	"Mister Magic"	Ralph MacDonald	8:58
2.	"Black Frost"	Bob James, Grover Washington Jr.	6:03
Total length:			32:51

== Personnel ==
- Grover Washington Jr. – soprano, alto and tenor saxophones
- Bob James – piano, Fender Rhodes, arrangements and conductor
- Eric Gale – guitars
- Phil Upchurch – bass (1)
- Gary King – bass (2-4)
- Harvey Mason – drums
- Ralph MacDonald – percussion

Brass and reed section

- Phil Bodner – baritone saxophone
- Jerry Dodgion – tenor saxophone
- Tony Studd – bass trombone
- Wayne Andre – trombone
- Jon Faddis and Marvin Stamm – trumpet, flugelhorn

String section

- Charles McCracken and Alan Shulman – cello
- Alfred Brown and Emanuel Vardi – viola
- Max Ellen, Paul Gershman, Harry Glickman, Harold Kohon, Harry Lookofsky, Joe Malin, David Nadien and Matthew Raimondi – violin

Production

- Creed Taylor – producer
- Rudy Van Gelder – engineer
- Bob Ciano – album design
- Alen MacWeeney – photography
- Doug Ramsey – liner notes

== Charts ==
Chart (1975)	Peak position
Billboard Pop Albums	10
Billboard Top Soul Albums	1
Billboard Top Jazz Albums	1

=== Singles ===
Year	Single	Chart positions	
Year	Single	US Pop	US R&B
1975	"Mister Magic"	54	16
