= Orlando Otey =

Mexican pianist

Orlando Otey (February 1, 1925 – October 23, 2011) was a Mexican-born pianist who gave his first concert at age 5 at the Teatro Iris in Mexico City. He became known as "The Chopin of Mexico" at age 14 because his playing and compositions were decidedly romantic in style.

At age 17, Otey became a faculty member at the University of Mexico School of Music. In 1946 he moved to the United States to pursue piano and composition studies at The Curtis Institute of Music in Philadelphia. During that time he studied with Gian Carlo Menotti and Vladimir Sokoloff.

In 1949 he competed as one of three US pianists in the Chopin Centennial Piano Competition in Warsaw, Poland.

Otey focused much of his life on developing the "Otey Music Theory", which is based on Nine Music Patterns. This lifelong project depicts his exploration of the Musical Key and Key Formula, Extension Staffs, and unique approaches to Tonality, Modality and piano techniques.

== Discography ==
- The Chopin of Mexico Plays Chopin (2007)
- The Chopin of Mexico Plays More Chopin (2008)
- Tenochtitlán 1325 (2012)
