= Grover Washington Jr. =

American jazz saxophonist (1943–1999)

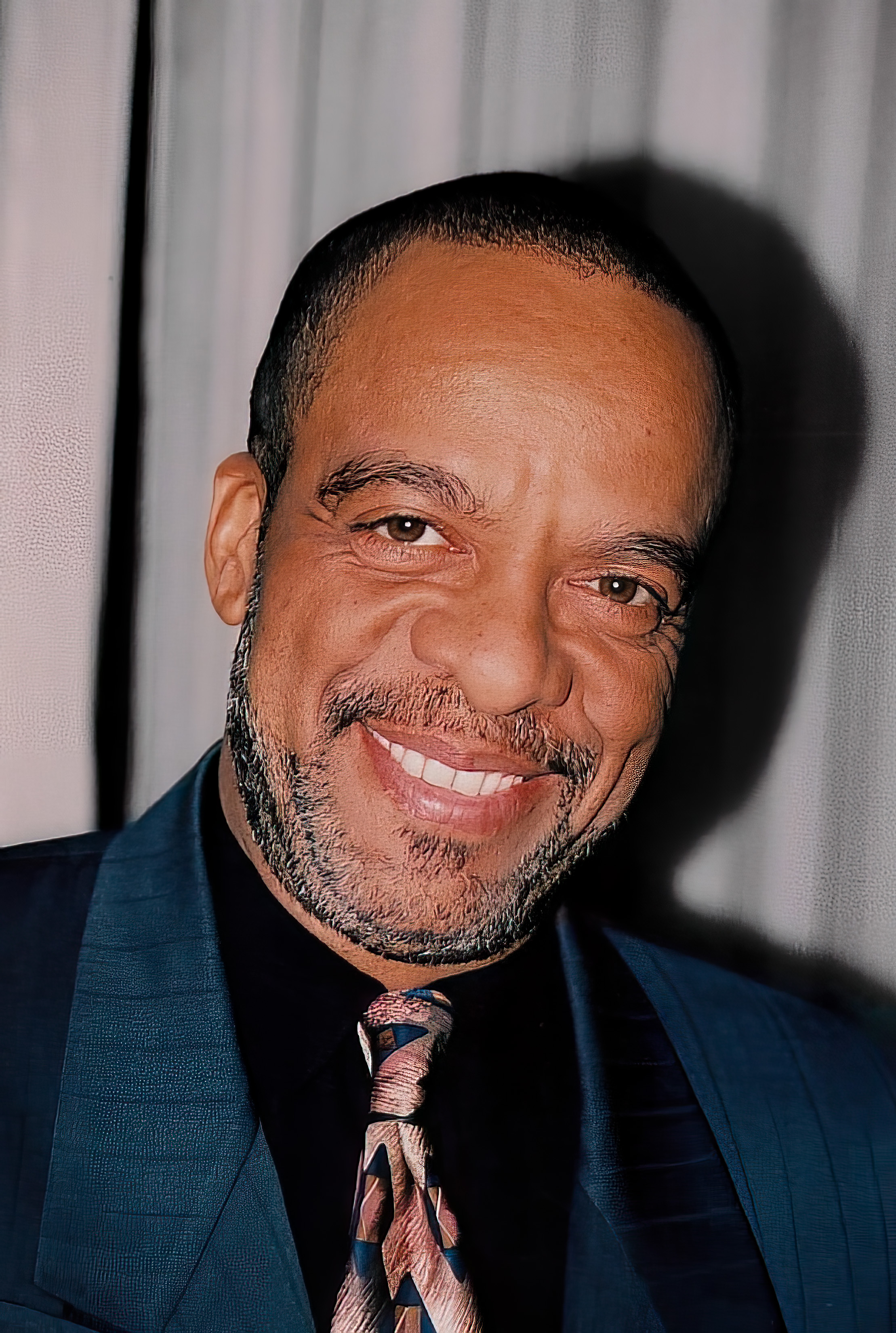
- Washington in 1995

Background information
- Born: Grover Washington Jr. December 12, 1943; Buffalo, New York, U.S.
- Died: December 17, 1999 (aged 56) New York City, U.S.
- Genres: Soul jazz; jazz-funk; R&B; smooth jazz
- Occupation: Musician
- Instruments: Saxophone; flute; keyboards
- Years active: 1967–1999
- Labels: Kudu; Motown; Elektra; Columbia
- Formerly of: The Blackout All-Stars
- Spouse: Christine Washington

Grover Washington Jr. (December 12, 1943 – December 17, 1999) was an American jazz-funk and soul-jazz saxophonist and Grammy Award winner. Along with Wes Montgomery and George Benson, he is considered by many to be one of the founders and legends of the smooth jazz genre. He wrote some of his material and later became an arranger and producer.

Throughout the 1970s and 1980s, Washington made some of the genre's most memorable hits, including "Mister Magic", "Reed Seed", "Black Frost", "Winelight", "Inner City Blues", "Let it Flow (For 'Dr. J')", and "The Best is Yet to Come". In addition, he performed very frequently with other artists, including Bill Withers on "Just the Two of Us", Patti LaBelle on "The Best Is Yet to Come", and Phyllis Hyman on "A Sacred Kind of Love".

== Early life ==
Washington was born in Buffalo, New York, on December 12, 1943. His mother was a church chorister, and his father was a collector of old jazz gramophone records and played the saxophone. He grew up listening to the great jazzmen and big band leaders like Benny Goodman and Fletcher Henderson. At the age of 8, Grover Sr. gave Jr. a saxophone. In addition to regular practice, Grover Jr. would sneak into clubs to see famous Buffalo blues musicians. His younger brother, drummer Darryl Washington, would follow in his footsteps. He also had another younger brother named Michael Washington, who was an accomplished gospel music organist who mastered the Hammond B3 organ. Washington was part of a vocal ensemble, the Teen Kings, which included Lonnie Smith.

== Career ==
=== Early career ===
Washington left Buffalo and played with a Midwest group called the Four Clefs and then the Mark III Trio from Mansfield, Ohio. Shortly thereafter, he was drafted into the U.S. Army, where he met drummer Billy Cobham. A music mainstay in New York City, Cobham introduced Washington to many New York musicians. After leaving the Army, Washington freelanced his talents around New York City, eventually landing in Philadelphia in 1967. In 1970 and 1971, he appeared on Leon Spencer's first two albums on Prestige Records, together with Idris Muhammad and Melvin Sparks.

Washington's breakthrough occurred when alto saxophonist Hank Crawford was unable to make a recording date with Creed Taylor's Kudu Records, and Washington was chosen as his replacement. This opportunity led to his debut solo album, Inner City Blues. Known for his versatility, Washington played soprano, alto, tenor, and baritone saxophone, gaining recognition for his contributions to jazz and his ability to blend into the mainstream.

=== Rise to fame ===
While his first three albums established him as a force in jazz and soul music, it was his fourth album in 1974, Mister Magic, that proved a major commercial success. The album climbed to No. 1 on Billboard's R&B album chart and number 10 on Billboard's Top 40 album chart. The title track reached No. 16 on the R&B singles chart (No. 54, pop). All these albums included guitarist Eric Gale as a near-permanent member in Washington's arsenal. His follow-up on Kudu in 1975, Feels So Good also made No. 1 on Billboard's R&B album chart and No. 10 on the pop album chart. Both albums were major parts of the jazz-funk movement of the mid-1970s.

A string of acclaimed records brought Washington through the 1970s, culminating in the signature piece for everything he would do from then on. Winelight (1980) was the album that defined everything Washington was then about, having signed for Elektra Records, part of the major Warner Music group. The album was smooth, fused with R&B and easy listening feel. Washington's love of basketball, especially the Philadelphia 76ers, led him to dedicate the second track, "Let It Flow", to Julius Erving (Dr. J). The highlight of the album was his collaboration with soul artist Bill Withers, "Just the Two of Us", a hit on radio during the spring and summer of 1981, peaking at No. 2 on the Billboard Hot 100. The album went platinum in 1981, and also won a Grammy Award in 1982 for Best Jazz Fusion Performance ("Winelight"). "Winelight" was also nominated for Record of the Year and Song of the Year.

In the post-Winelight era, Washington is credited for giving rise to a new batch of talent that would make its mark in the late 1980s and early 1990s. He is known for bringing Kenny G to the forefront, as well as artists such as Kirk Whalum, Walter Beasley, Steve Cole, Pamela Williams, Najee, Boney James and George Howard. His song "Mister Magic" is noted as being influential on go-go music starting in the mid-1970s.

== Death ==
On December 17, 1999, five days after his 56th birthday, Washington collapsed while waiting in the green room after performing four songs for The Saturday Early Show, at CBS Studios in New York City. He was taken to St. Luke's-Roosevelt Hospital, where he was pronounced dead at about 7:30 pm. His doctors determined that he had suffered a major heart attack. He is interred at West Laurel Hill Cemetery in Bala Cynwyd, Pennsylvania.

== Tributes ==
A large mural of Washington, part of the Philadelphia Mural Arts Program, is just south of the intersection of Broad and Diamond streets. A Philadelphia middle school in the Olney section of the city is named after Washington. Grover Washington Jr. Middle School caters to fifth- to eighth-grade students interested in the creative and performing arts.

There is a mural dedicated to Grover Washington, Jr. in Buffalo, where he grew up and attended school.

== Inductions and other awards ==
In 1992, Washington was inducted into the Philadelphia Music Alliance Walk Of Fame.

On April 24, 2023, Washington was inducted into the newly established Atlantic City Walk Of Fame, presented by The National R&B Music Society Inc. Washington's daughter Shana Washington was in attendance to accept the honor. Jazz and R&B artist Jean Carn inducted Washington. James Brown, The Delfonics and Little Anthony & The Imperials were also inducted in the inaugural class.

== Equipment ==
Equipment
Instrument	Brand/Model	Mouthpiece	Reed
Soprano Saxophone	H. Couf Superba I, black nickel plated	Runyon Custom No. 8	Rico Royal No. 5
Alto Saxophone	Selmer Mark VI	New York Meyer U.S.A. 7MM	Rico Royal No. 5
Tenor Saxophone	H. Couf Superba I, gold plated	Berg Larsen Hard Rubber 130/0	Rico Royal No. 5

(Although he was later photographed with Keilwerth SX90 and SX90R black nickel plated soprano, alto, and tenor saxophones on album covers, he rarely played them live or in the studio.)

== Discography ==
=== Albums ===
==== As leader ====
Year	Album	Peak chart positions					Certifications
Year	Album	US 200	US R&B	US Jazz	AUS	UK	Certifications
1972	Inner City Blues	62	8	4	—	—	
1972	All the King's Horses	111	20	1	—	—	
1973	Soul Box	100	26	1	—	—	
1975	Mister Magic	10	1	1	—	—	
1975	Feels So Good	10	1	1	—	—	
1976	A Secret Place	31	7	1	—	—	
1977	Live at The Bijou	11	4	1	—	—	
1978	Reed Seed	35	7	1	—	—	
1979	Paradise	24	15	2	—	—	
1980	Skylarkin'	24	8	1	—	—	
1980	Winelight	5	2	1	35	34	BPI: Silver
1981	Come Morning	28	—	1	—	98	
1981	Baddest	96	40	5	—	—	
1981	Anthology	149	44	11	—	—	
1982	The Best Is Yet to Come	50	8	1	100	—	
1984	Inside Moves	79	21	3	—	—	
1986	A House Full of Love	125	52	25	—	—	
1987	Strawberry Moon	66	29	—	100	—	
1988	Then and Now	—	—	2	—	—	
1989	Time Out of Mind	—	60	1	—	—	
1992	Next Exit	149	26	1	—	—	
1994	All My Tomorrows	—	—	2	—	—	
1996	Soulful Strut	187	45	2	—	—	
1997	Breath of Heaven: A Holiday Collection	—	—	7	—	—	
2000	Aria	—	—	—	—	—	
	Anything marked with a – does not have a rating.						

==== As sideman ====
With Eddie Henderson

- Inspiration (Milestone, 1995) – rec. 1994
- Tribute to Lee Morgan (NYC Music, 1995)

With Boogaloo Joe Jones

- No Way! (Prestige, 1971) – rec. 1970
- What It Is (Prestige, 1971)

With Jean-Luc Ponty

- Storytelling (Jean-Luc Ponty album) (Columbia, 1989)

With Johnny "Hammond" Smith

- What's Going On (Prestige, 1971)
- Breakout (Kudu, 1971)
- Wild Horses Rock Steady (Kudu, 1972) – rec. 1971

With Leon Spencer

- Sneak Preview! (Prestige, 1971) – rec. 1970
- Louisiana Slim (Prestige, 1971)

With others

- Kathleen Battle, So Many Stars (Sony, 1995)
- Kenny Burrell, Togethering (Blue Note, 1985) – recorded in 1984
- Hank Crawford, Help Me Make it Through the Night (Kudu, 1972)
- Charles Earland, Living Black! (Prestige, 1971) – live recorded in 1970
- Dexter Gordon, American Classic (Elektra Musician, 1982)
- Urbie Green, Señor Blues (CTI, 1977)
- Masaru Imada, Blue Marine (Trio, 1982)
- The Mark III Trio, Let's Ska at the Ski Lodge (Downhill, 1964)
- Idris Muhammad, Power of Soul (Kudu, 1974)
- Gerry Mulligan, Dragonfly (Telarc Jazz, 1995)
- Don Sebesky, Giant Box (CTI, 1973)
- Lonnie Smith, Mama Wailer (Kudu, 1971)
- Melvin Sparks, Spark Plug (Prestige, 1971)
- Urban Knights, Urban Knights I (GRP, 1995)
- Mal Waldron, My Dear Family (Evidence, 1993)
- Randy Weston, Blue Moses (CTI, 1972)
- Bill Withers, Just the Two of Us (Columbia, 1981)

=== Singles ===
Year	Single	Peak chart positions			Certifications
Year	Single	US Pop	US R&B	UK	Certifications
1971	"Inner City Blues"	—	42	—	
1972	"Mercy Mercy Me"	—	—	—	
1972	"No Tears in the End"	—	49	—	
1973	"Masterpiece"	—	—	—	
1975	"Mister Magic"	54	16	—	
1976	"Knucklehead"	—	—	—	
1977	"Summer Song"	—	57	—	
1978	"Do Dat"	—	75	—	
1979	"Tell Me About It Now"	—	57	—	
1980	"Snake Eyes"	—	88	—	
1980	"Winelight"	—	—	—	
1981	"Just the Two of Us"	2	3	34	BPI: Platinum
1982	"Be Mine (Tonight)"	92	13	—	
1982	"Jamming"	—	65	—	
1983	"The Best Is Yet to Come"	—	14	—	
1984	"Inside Moves"	—	79	—	
1987	"Summer Nights"	—	35	—	
1989	"Jamaica"	—	—	—	
1990	"Sacred Kind of Love"	—	21	—	
1992	"Love Like This"	—	31	—	
"—" denotes releases that did not chart or were not released in that territory.
