= Ashford & Simpson =

American songwriting and recording duo

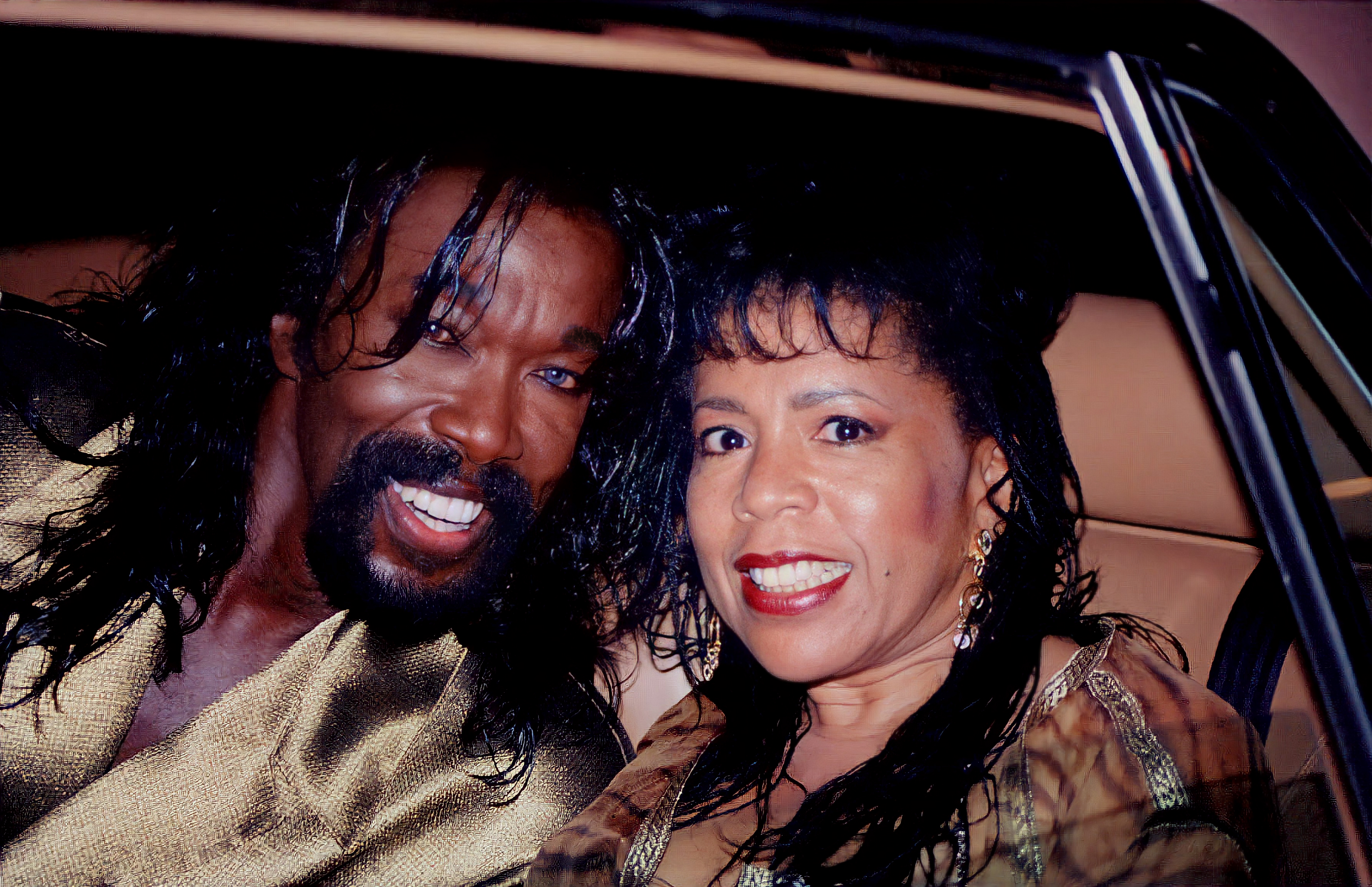
- Ashford & Simpson in 2000

Background information
- Origin: New York City, U.S.
- Genres: R&B; soul; funk; disco; gospel
- Years active: 1964–2011
- Labels: Motown; Warner Bros.; Capitol

Ashford & Simpson were an American husband-and-wife songwriting, production and recording duo composed of Nickolas Ashford (May 4, 1941 – August 22, 2011) and Valerie Simpson (born August 26, 1946).

Ashford was born in Fairfield, South Carolina, and Simpson in the Bronx, New York City. Ashford's family relocated to Ypsilanti, Michigan, where he became a member of Christ Temple Baptist Church. While there, he sang with a group called the Hammond Singers (named after the founding minister, James Hammond). Later, Ashford attended and graduated from Willow Run High School in Ypsilanti, Michigan, before pursuing his professional career, when he would ultimately meet his wife, Valerie Simpson. They met at Harlem's White Rock Baptist Church in 1964. After having recorded unsuccessfully as a duo, they joined an aspiring solo artist and former member of The Ikettes, Joshie Jo Armstead, at the Scepter/Wand label, where their compositions were recorded by Ronnie Milsap ("Never Had It So Good") and Maxine Brown ("One Step at a Time"), as well as The Shirelles, The Guess Who, and Chuck Jackson. Another of the trio's songs, "Let's Go Get Stoned", gave Ray Charles a number one U.S. R&B hit in 1966. That same year, Ashford and Simpson joined Motown, where their best-known songs included "Ain't No Mountain High Enough", "You're All I Need to Get By", "Ain't Nothing Like the Real Thing", and "Reach Out and Touch (Somebody's Hand)". Ashford and Simpson wrote many other hit songs, including Chaka Khan's "I'm Every Woman" (1978) and "Is It Still Good to Ya?", originally recorded by the duo in 1978 and covered by Teddy Pendergrass in 1980.

As performers, Ashford & Simpson's best-known duets are "Solid" (1984) and "Found a Cure" (1979). The duo was inducted into the Songwriters Hall of Fame in 2002. They are also recipients of The Rhythm & Blues Foundation's Pioneer Award, ASCAP Founders Award, and the Grammy Trustee Award. Rolling Stone ranked them No. 19 on its list of the 20 Greatest Duos of All Time.

Nick Ashford was also an occasional actor, having appeared as Reverend Oates in the 1991 movie New Jack City.

== Career ==
=== Songwriters ===
The duo essentially had two careers: one as a successful writing and producing team and the other as singers and performers themselves. They started their career in the mid-1960s, writing for artists such as the 5th Dimension ("California Soul"), Aretha Franklin ("Cry Like a Baby"), and Ray Charles ("Let's Go Get Stoned"). Their work with Charles brought them to the attention of Motown chief Berry Gordy.

Upon joining the Motown staff in 1966, Ashford & Simpson were paired with the vocal duo Marvin Gaye and Tammi Terrell, and they wrote and/or produced all but one of the late-1960s Gaye/Terrell singles, including hits such as the original version of "Ain't No Mountain High Enough", "Your Precious Love", "Ain't Nothing Like the Real Thing", and "You're All I Need to Get By". According to Gaye in the book Divided Soul, Simpson did most of the vocals on the last album he did with Terrell, Easy, as a way for Terrell's family to have additional income, as she was battling an ultimately fatal brain tumor. Though Louvain Demps, singer of the Andantes, has stated that she saw Terrell recording the album, Simpson is quoted as saying, in a book written by Terrell's sister Ludie Montgomery, what they saw was her singing the guide tracks for the album, which were later replaced by Tammi's own vocals.

Ashford & Simpson wrote and produced almost all the songs on three 1970s albums for former Supreme Diana Ross, including her first solo album Diana Ross ("Reach Out and Touch (Somebody's Hand)") and "Ain't No Mountain High Enough", Surrender ("Remember Me"), and The Boss. All three albums were critically acclaimed with Diana Ross, her 1970 album debut, and The Boss being certified platinum and "Surrender" certified gold.

Other Motown artists whom Ashford & Simpson worked with include Gladys Knight & the Pips ("Didn't You Know You'd Have to Cry Sometime", and after Motown they wrote and produced for this group "Landlord", "Bourgie, Bourgie", and "Taste of Bitter Love"), Smokey Robinson & the Miracles ("Who's Gonna Take the Blame"), Syreeta Wright ("I Can't Give Back the Love I Feel for You"), the Marvelettes ("Destination: Anywhere"), Martha Reeves and the Vandellas ("Tear It On Down" and "It Ain't Like That"), the Dynamic Superiors ("Shoe, Shoe Shine"), Blinky Williams ("I Wouldn't Change the Man He Is"), and the Supremes with the Four Tops (original duets, plus the production of a hit cover of Phil Spector's "River Deep-Mountain High").

Other artists with whom Ashford & Simpson had hits were Teddy Pendergrass ("Is It Still Good to Ya"), the Brothers Johnson ("Ride-O-Rocket"), Stephanie Mills ("Keep Away Girls"), Ace Spectrum ("Don't Send Nobody Else') and Chaka Khan, both on her own ("I'm Every Woman" and "Clouds"), and with Rufus ("Keep It Comin'" and "Ain't Nothin' But a Maybe").

=== Performers ===
Ashford & Simpson's career as recording artists began in the early 1960s as part of the gospel group the Followers, with whom they recorded the album Gospel Meeting (on Forum Circle), later issued as Meetin' The Followers (on Roulette Records). The LP contains their vocals and also four Ashford compositions. In 1964, they recorded "I'll Find You", as "Valerie & Nick". That was followed by several obscure singles recorded by Ashford on the Glover, Verve and ABC labels, such as "It Ain't Like That" (not the same song as they would later write for Martha Reeves and the Vandellas), "California Soul", and "Dead End Kids", backed by his own version of "Let's Go Get Stoned".

Simpson appeared (with Melba Moore) as part of the "Blood, Sweat & Tears Soul Chorus" on the band's debut album Child Is Father to the Man in 1968. After concentrating on working with other artists, Simpson was the featured soloist on the songs "Bridge Over Troubled Water" and "What's Going On" on the Quincy Jones albums Gula Matari in 1970, and its follow-up, Smackwater Jack.

Simpson subsequently recorded two solo LPs for Motown: Exposed in 1971, and, the following year, Valerie Simpson, which included the single "Silly, Wasn't I". In 1973, they left Motown after the albums Simpson recorded for the label received poor promotion, and the company refused to release an album of the duo recording a collection of their most famous songs for other artists.

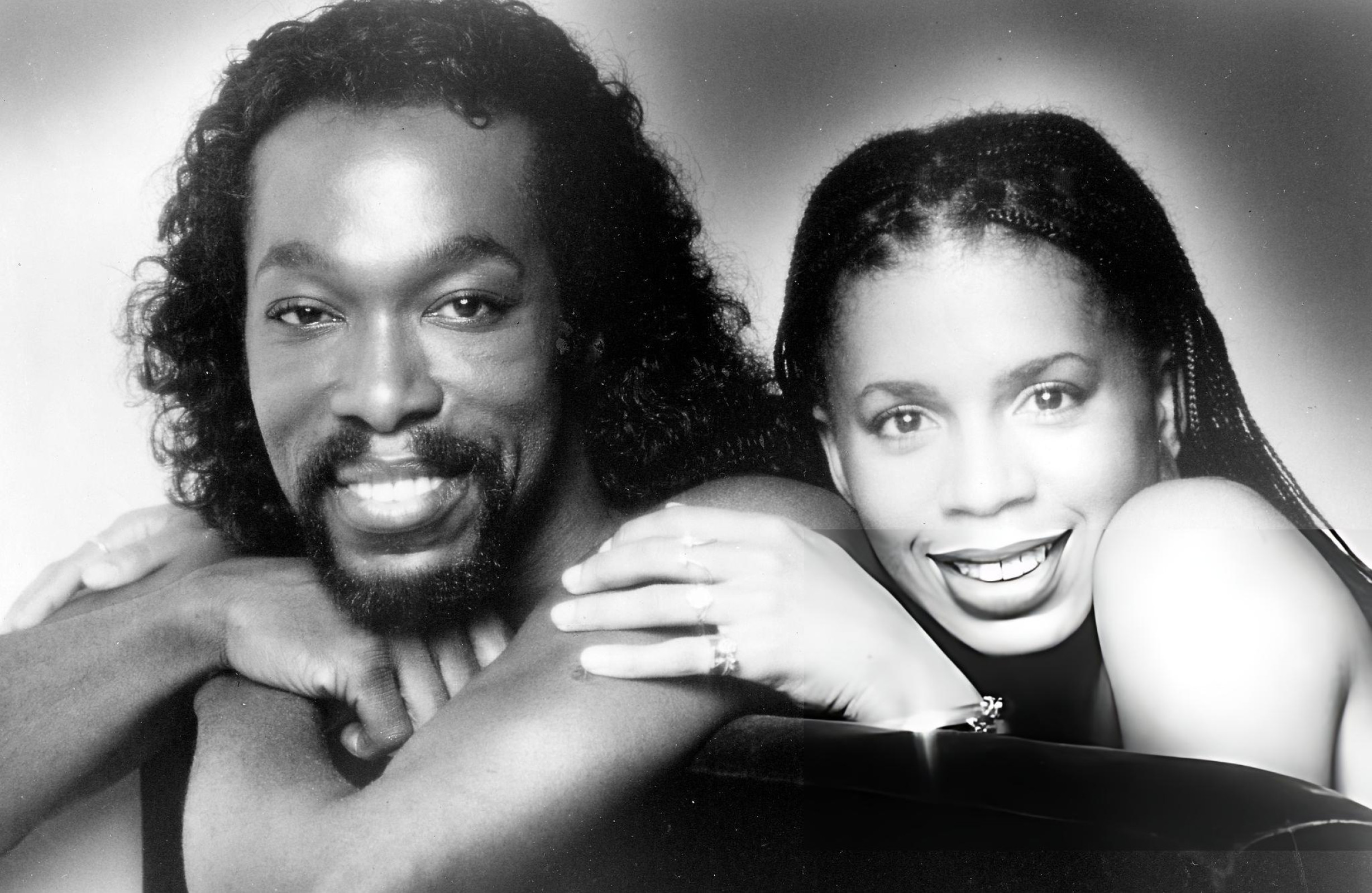
Ashford & Simpson c. 1977

Ashford and Simpson married after resuming their career as a duo and would go on to have two daughters. In 1973, Warner Bros. released their first duo album titled Gimme Something Real. This was followed in 1974 by I Wanna Be Selfish. In 1975, Simpson sang backing vocals on Paul Simon's number-one hit "50 Ways to Leave Your Lover", and in 1976 they released Come As You Are. 1977 saw the release of two albums – So So Satisfied and Send It. This was followed by the hit singles "Send It", "Don't Cost You Nothin'" (1977), "It Seems To Hang On" (1978), "Is It Still Good To Ya" (1978), "Found a Cure" (1979), "Street Corner" (1982), and their biggest hit, "Solid", released in 1984.

In 1978, they were featured as vocalists along with Chaka Khan, on the hit single "Stuff Like That" from Quincy Jones' Sounds...and Stuff Like That!! album and contributed to the writing of the soundtrack to The Wiz.

In 1986, the duo appeared as themselves in "Nocturne", an episode of the popular television series The Equalizer, where they performed their hit single "Count Your Blessings" from their Real Love album.

On his own, Ashford (along with Frank Wilson) produced the hit "I'm Gonna Make You Love Me", which Diana Ross & the Supremes recorded in collaboration with the Temptations in 1968. He also appeared in the movie New Jack City (1991), as Reverend Oates, an ordained minister who was part of Nino Brown's entourage.

Simpson's brothers were in the record business as well: Ray Simpson replaced Victor Willis in the Village People and their brother Jimmy Simpson produced the group GQ (which had big hits with "Disco Nights (Rock-Freak)" and "I Do Love You"), and was in great demand as a mixing engineer during the disco era.

=== Recent years and Ashford's death ===
In latter times, Ashford & Simpson recorded and toured sporadically, and in 1996, they opened a restaurant and live entertainment venue, Sugar Bar in New York City, with an open mic on Thursday nights, where performers included Queen Latifah, Vickie Natale and Felicia Collins. Ashford & Simpson recorded the album Been Found with poet Maya Angelou in 1996. Around that time, they were also featured disc jockeys on New York radio station WRKS.

On August 16, 2006, Playbill Online reported that they were writing the score for a musical based on E. Lynn Harris's novel Invisible Life.

Ashford died at the age of 70 in a New York City hospital on August 22, 2011, four days before Valerie Simpson's 65th birthday, of complications from throat cancer. His publicist, Liz Rosenberg, said that he had undergone radiation therapy to treat his illness.

Simpson released a solo album in June 2012, called Dinosaurs Are Coming Back Again, which also featured the last recorded performance of Nina Simone, a second duet with Roberta Flack and an instrumental version of "Ain't No Mountain High Enough".

In May 2014, Simpson was awarded an Honorary Doctorate of Music from Berklee College of Music.

== Awards and nominations ==
In 1969, Ashford and Simpson won three BMI Awards for the songs "Ain't No Mountain High Enough," "Ain't Nothing Like the Real Thing," and "Your Precious Love."

Ashford and Simpson were inducted into the Songwriters Hall of Fame in 2002. They were also recipients of The Rhythm & Blues Foundation's Pioneer Award in 1999, and ASCAP's highest honor, the Founders Award, which they received in 1996.

Simpson was inducted among the inaugural honorees to the Women Songwriters Hall of Fame in 2021.

=== Grammy Awards ===
Ashford and Simpson were nominated for three Grammy Awards. In 2019, they received the Grammy Trustees Award.

Year	Nominee / work	Award	Result
1985	Ashford And Simpson	Best Video, Short Form	Nominated
1986	Solid	Best R&B Performance by a Duo or Group with Vocal	Nominated
1987	Real Love	Best R&B Performance by a Duo or Group with Vocal	Nominated

== Discography ==
=== Studio albums ===
Year	Album	Peak chart positions									Certifications	Record label
Year	Album	US	US R&B	AUT	CAN	GER	NLD	NZ	SWI	UK	Certifications	Record label
1973	Gimme Something Real	156	18	—	—	—	—	—	—	—		Warner Bros.
1974	I Wanna Be Selfish	195	21	—	—	—	—	—	—	—		Warner Bros.
1976	Come as You Are	189	35	—	—	—	—	—	—	—		Warner Bros.
1977	So So Satisfied	180	30	—	—	—	—	—	—	—		Warner Bros.
1977	Send It	52	10	—	53	—	—	—	—	—	RIAA: Gold	Warner Bros.
1978	Is It Still Good to Ya	20	1	—	43	—	—	—	—	—	RIAA: Gold	Warner Bros.
1979	Stay Free	23	3	—	71	—	—	—	—	—	RIAA: Gold	Warner Bros.
1980	A Musical Affair	38	8	—	—	—	—	—	—	—		Warner Bros.
1982	Street Opera	45	5	—	—	—	—	—	—	—		Capitol
1983	High-Rise	84	14	—	—	—	—	—	—	—		Capitol
1984	Solid	29	1	13	47	11	25	17	15	42	RIAA: Gold	Capitol
1986	Real Love	74	12	—	—	—	—	—	—	—		Capitol
1989	Love or Physical	135	28	—	—	—	—	—	—	—		Capitol
1996	Been Found	—	49	—	—	—	—	—	—	—		Hopsack & Silk
"—" denotes a recording that did not chart or was not released in that territory.

=== Live albums ===
Year	Album	Peak chart positions		Record label
Year	Album	US	US R&B	Record label
1981	Performance	125	45	Warner Bros.
2009	The Real Thing	—	59	Burgundy
"—" denotes a recording that did not chart or was not released in that territory.

=== Compilation albums ===
- The Best of Ashford & Simpson (1993, Capitol)
- Capitol Gold: The Best of Ashford & Simpson (1996, Capitol)
- The Gospel According to Ashford & Simpson: Count Your Blessings (1996, EMI)
- The Very Best of Ashford & Simpson (2002, Warner Bros./Rhino)
- The Warner Bros. Years: Hits, Remixes & Rarities (2008, Rhino)
- Love Will Fix It: The Warner Bros. Records Anthology 1973-1981 (2018, Groove Line)

=== Singles ===
Year	Single	Peak chart positions										Certifications	Album
Year	Single	US	US R&B	US Dan	AUT	CAN	GER	NLD	NZ	SWI	UK	Certifications	Album
1964	"I'll Find You" ^{[A]}	117	—	—	—	—	—	—	—	—	—		—N/a
1964	"Don't You Feel Sorry" ^{[A]}	—	—	—	—	—	—	—	—	—	—		—N/a
1964	"It Ain't Like That" ^{[A]}	—	—	—	—	—	—	—	—	—	—		—N/a
1973	"(I'd Know You) Anywhere"	88	37	—	—	—	—	—	—	—	—		Gimme Something Real
1974	"Have You Ever Tried It"	—	77	—	—	—	—	—	—	—	—		Gimme Something Real
1974	"Main Line"	—	37	—	—	—	—	—	—	—	—		I Wanna Be Selfish
1974	"Everybody's Got to Give It Up"	—	53	—	—	—	—	—	—	—	—		I Wanna Be Selfish
1975	"Bend Me"	—	73	—	—	—	—	—	—	—	—		Gimme Something Real
1976	"It'll Come, It'll Come, It'll Come"	—	96	—	—	—	—	—	—	—	—		Come as You Are
1976	"Somebody Told a Lie"	—	58	—	—	—	—	—	—	—	—		Come as You Are
1976	"One More Try"	—	—	9	—	—	—	—	—	—	—		Come as You Are
1976	"Tried, Tested and Found True"	—	52	34	—	—	—	—	—	—	—		So So Satisfied
1977	"So So Satisfied"	—	27	—	—	—	—	—	—	—	—		So So Satisfied
1977	"Over and Over"	—	39	—	—	—	—	—	—	—	—		So So Satisfied
1977	"Send It"	—	15	—	—	—	—	—	—	—	—		Send It
1978	"Don't Cost You Nothing"	79	10	23	—	—	—	—	—	—	58 (Note: Chart position is from the official UK "Breakers List".)		Send It
1978	"By Way of Love's Express"	—	35	—	—	—	—	—	—	—	—		Send It
1978	"Stuff Like That" (with Quincy Jones & Chaka Khan) ^{[B]}	21	1	—	—	23	—	24	—	—	34		Sounds...and Stuff Like That!!
1978	"It Seems to Hang On"	—	2	—	—	—	—	—	—	—	48		Is It Still Good to Ya
1978	"Is It Still Good to Ya"	—	12	—	—	—	—	—	—	—	—		Is It Still Good to Ya
1979	"Flashback"	—	70	—	—	—	—	—	—	—	—		Is It Still Good to Ya
1979	"Found a Cure"	36	2	1	—	65	—	37	—	—	—		Stay Free
1979	"Nobody Knows"	—	19	1	—	—	—	—	—	—	—		Stay Free
1979	"Stay Free"	—	—	1	—	—	—	—	—	—	—		Stay Free
1980	"Love Don't Make It Right"	—	6	7	—	—	—	—	—	—	—		A Musical Affair
1980	"Happy Endings"	—	35	—	—	—	—	—	—	—	—		A Musical Affair
1981	"Get Out Your Handkerchief"	—	65	—	—	—	—	—	—	—	—		A Musical Affair
1981	"It Shows in the Eyes"	—	34	—	—	—	—	—	—	—	—		Performance
1981	"It's the Long Run"	—	—	—	—	—	—	—	—	—	—		Performance
1982	"Street Corner"	56	9	11	—	—	—	—	—	—	—		Street Opera
1982	"Love It Away"	—	20	—	—	—	—	—	—	—	—		Street Opera
1983	"I'll Take the Whole World On"	—	—	—	—	—	—	—	—	—	—		Street Opera
1983	"High-Rise"	—	17	41	—	—	—	—	—	—	—		High-Rise
1983	"It's Much Deeper"	—	45	—	—	—	—	—	—	—	—		High-Rise
1984	"I'm Not That Tough"	—	78	—	—	—	—	—	—	—	—		High-Rise
1984	"Solid"	12	1	15	4	5	2	3	1	3	3	BPI: Gold; MC: Gold	Solid
1985	"Outta the World"	102	4	4	—	—	—	—	—	—	—		Solid
1985	"Babies"	102	29	—	—	—	53	—	—	—	56		Solid
1986	"Count Your Blessings"	84	4	—	—	—	—	—	—	—	79		Real Love
1986	"What Becomes of Love"	—	—	—	—	—	—	—	—	—	—		Real Love
1987	"Nobody Walks in L.A."	—	—	—	—	—	—	—	—	—	—		Real Love
1989	"I'll Be There for You"	—	2	—	—	—	—	—	—	—	—		Love or Physical
1989	"Cookies and Cake"	—	—	—	—	—	—	—	—	—	—		Love or Physical
1990	"Hungry for Me Again"	—	40	—	—	—	—	—	—	—	—		Def by Temptation
1996	"Been Found"	—	80	—	—	—	—	—	—	—	—		Been Found
1997	"What If"	—	94	—	—	—	—	—	—	—	—		Been Found
2001	"We Are Family" (with Various Artists)	—	—	—	—	—	—	—	—	—	—		—N/a
"—" denotes a recording that did not chart or was not released in that territory.

- ^{A} Singles credited to Valerie & Nick
- ^{B} Ashford & Simpson and Khan sang uncredited co-lead vocals on "Stuff Like That"

=== Solo recordings ===
==== Valerie Simpson ====
Listed below are solo recordings made by Valerie Simpson.

===== Albums =====
Year	Album	Peak chart positions		Record label
Year	Album	US	US R&B	Record label
1971	Exposed	159	30	Tamla
1972	Valerie Simpson	162	50	Tamla
2012	Dinosaurs Are Coming Back Again	—	—	Hopsack & Silk
"—" denotes a recording that did not chart or was not released in that territory.

===== Singles =====
Year	Single	Peak chart positions		Album
Year	Single	US	US R&B	Album
1971	"Can't It Wait Until Tomorrow"	—	—	Exposed
1972	"Silly Wasn't I"	63	24	Valerie Simpson
"—" denotes a recording that did not chart or was not released in that territory.

==== Nick Ashford ====
Listed below are solo recordings made by Nick Ashford.

===== Singles =====
- 1966: "I Don't Need No Doctor"
- 1967: "When I Feel the Need"
- 1968: "California Soul"
- 1970: "Dead End Kids"

== See also ==
- List of Number 1 Dance Hits (United States)
- List of artists who reached number one on the US Dance chart
