= Found a Cure (Ashford & Simpson song) =

- German release picture sleeve

Single by Ashford & Simpson

from the album Stay Free
- B-side: "You Always Could"
- Released: 1979
- Genre: Soul; disco
- Length: 3:44 (7" version); 6:59 (Album version)
- Label: Warner Bros.
- Songwriter: Nickolas Ashford, Valerie Simpson
- Producers: Nickolas Ashford, Valerie Simpson

"Found a Cure" is a 1979 single by Ashford & Simpson, from their album, Stay Free. Along with the title track and the song, "Nobody Knows", "Found a Cure" hit number one on the dance/disco chart for two weeks. The tracks replaced Diana Ross's album, The Boss, which was produced by Ashford & Simpson. "Found a Cure" also crossed over to the soul singles chart where it stayed at number two for three weeks , as well as crossing over to the pop singles chart where it made the Top 40 peaking at number 36.

== Chart performance ==
| Chart (1979) | Peak position |
|---|---|
| Canada (RPM Top 100) | 65 |
| Canada (RPM Dance Music) | 7 |
| US Billboard Hot 100 | 36 |
| US Billboard Disco Top 80 | 1 |
| US Billboard Hot Soul Singles | 2 |
