= Ullanda McCullough =

American singer

- Genres: R&B; soul; disco; gospel; pop
- Occupation: Singer
- Instrument: Vocals
- Years active: 1970–1991
- Labels: Ariola; Atlantic

Ullanda McCullough is an American pop music singer most noted as a backing vocalist.

== Career ==
McCullough began her singing career at age 13 in Detroit, Michigan. In early 1970s she sang numerous advertising jingles including the 1971 Coca-Cola commercial I'd Like to Teach the World to Sing. In 1974, she was a backing vocalist on Eddie Floyd's album, Soul Street. In 1975, McCullough relocated from Detroit to New York City to continue her career as a background singer. She sang background vocals for Ashford & Simpson, Diana Ross, Tina Turner, Luther Vandross, Quincy Jones, Bette Midler and others.

In 1979 McCullough began a solo career and recorded three albums: Love Zone (1979), Ullanda McCullough (1981) and Watching You Watching Me (1982). Afterward, she returned to singing backup for Billy Joel, the Weather Girls, Bill Withers, and others. She also provided backing vocals for the animated series, Jem.

== Personal life ==
McCullough became a born-again Christian in the 1990s. She co-authored her biography with Cecil Murphey, Something Special: The Story of Ullanda Innocent, in 1996.

== Discography ==
=== Studio albums ===
Year	Album	Record label
1979	Love Zone	Ariola Records
1981	Ullanda McCullough	Atlantic Records
1982	Watching You Watching Me	Atlantic Records

=== Compilation albums ===
- Watching You Watching Me (2014)

=== Singles ===
Year	Single	Peak chart positions		
Year	Single	US R&B	US Dance	UK
1979	"Stars"	―	―	―
1979	"Want Ads"	65	17	―
1979	"Around and Around"	84	―	―
1981	"You'll Never Know" (with Hi Gloss)	―	―	12
1981	"Bad Company / It's You"	36	18	―
1981	"Rock Me"	―	―	―
1982	"Watching You Watching Me"	―	―	―
"—" denotes releases that did not chart or were not released in that territory.
