= Michael Brecker discography =

Discography of Michael Brecker.

== Discography ==
=== As leader/co-leader ===
- Cityscape with Claus Ogerman (Warner Bros., 1982)
- Michael Brecker (Impulse!, 1987)
- Don't Try This at Home (Impulse!, 1988)
- Now You See It...Now You Don't (GRP, 1990)
- Tales from the Hudson (Impulse!, 1996)
- Two Blocks from the Edge (Impulse!, 1998)
- Time Is of the Essence (Verve, 1999)
- Nearness of You: The Ballad Book (Verve, 2001) - recorded in 2000
- Directions in Music: Live at Massey Hall with Herbie Hancock, Roy Hargrove (Verve, 2002) - recorded in 2001
- Wide Angles (Verve, 2003)
- Pilgrimage (Heads Up, 2007) - recorded in 2006

As Brecker Brothers

- The Brecker Bros. (Arista, 1975)
- Back to Back (Arista, 1976)
- Don't Stop the Music (Arista, 1977)
- Heavy Metal Be-Bop (Arista, 1978) – live
- Detente (Arista, 1980)
- Straphangin' (Arista, 1981)
- Return of the Brecker Brothers (GRP, 1992)
- Out of the Loop (GRP, 1994) - recorded in 1992

Compilations

- The Brecker Bros. Collection, Vol 1 (Novus, 1990)
- The Brecker Bros. Collection, Vol 2 (Novus, 1991)

As Steps

- Step by Step (Better Days, 1981)
- Smokin' in the Pit (Better Days, 1981)
- Paradox (Better Days, 1982)

As Steps Ahead

- Steps Ahead (Elektra, 1983)
- Modern Times (Elektra, 1984)
- Magnetic (Elektra, 1986)
- Live in Tokyo (NYC, 1994) - recorded in 1986

=== With others ===
- (Original Motion Picture Soundtrack) The Wiz 1978 MCA 2-MCA6010
- (Original Motion Picture Soundtrack) Warriors, The 1979 A&M SP-3151
- (Original Motion Picture Soundtrack) Footloose 1984 Columbia JS39242
- (Original Motion Picture Soundtrack) 9 1/2 1986 Capitol CDP46722
- (Original Motion Picture Soundtrack) Bright Lights, Big City 1988 W.P. 25688-1
- (Original Motion Picture Soundtrack) Midnight in the Garden of Good and Evil
- (Original TV Soundtrack) A House Full of Love (Bill Cosby Show) 1986 Columbia CK 40270
- ACOM Cozmopolitan 1981 East World/EMI EWJ-80193
- Abercrombie, John Night 1984 ECM 8232122(ECM1272)
- Abercrombie, John Getting There 1988 ECM 8334942(ECM1321)
- Abercrombie, John Works (Compilation) 1988 ECM ECM 837 275-2
- Acogny, Georges Guitars on the Move 1983 String 33855
- Aerosmith Pandora's Box (Compilation)
- Aerosmith Get Your Wings 1974 Columbia PC32847
- Air - Air 1971 Embryo SD-733
- Akkerman, Jan 3 1979 Atlantic K50664
- Alessi All for a Reason 1978 A&M 4657
- Allison, Luther Motown Years 1972–1976 (Compilation)
- Allison, Luther Night Life 1979 Gordy G-974V1
- Ambrosetti, Franco Wings 1983 Enja 4068
- Ambrosetti, Franco Tentets 1985 Enja
- Ambrosetti, Franco Gin and Pentatonic (Compilation) 1992 Enja 4096 2
- Arista All Stars Blue Montreux 1978 Arista AB-4224
- Arista All Stars Blue Montreux II 1978 Arista AB-4245
- Arista All Stars Blue Montreux (CD Compilation) 1988 BMG 6573-2-RB
- Artful Dodger Babes On Broadway 1977 Columbia 34846
- Ashford & Simpson Stay Free 1979 Warner Bros. HS3357
- Ashford & Simpson Solid 1984 Capitol ECS-81696
- Aurex Jazz Festival '80 Jazz of the 80's 1983 East World EWJ-80190
- Aurex Jazz Festival '80 Live Special (Compilation) 1983 East World EWJ-80253
- Austin, Patti End of a Rainbow 1976 CTI CTI-5001
- Austin, Patti Havana Candy 1977 CTI CTI-5006
- Austin, Patti Live at the Bottom Line 1979 CTI CTI-7086
- Austin, Patti Body Language 1980 CTI CTI-36503
- Austin, Patti Gettin' Away with Murder 1985 Qwest 25276-1
- Austin, Patti The Real Me Qwest 9 25696-2
- Average White Band AWB 1974 Atlantic SD-7308(19116-2)
- Average White Band Soul Searching 1976 Atlantic SD-18179
- Average White Band Benny & Us 1977 Atlantic 19105
- Average White Band Warmer Communications 1978 RCA 13053
- Average White Band Feel No Fret 1979 Atlantic 3063(UK)
- BFD BFD 1994 Canyon PCCY-00703
- Baby Grand Baby Grand 1978 Arista 4148
- Bad News Travels Fast Ordinary Man 1979 Casablanca NBLP-7181
- Bad News Travels Fast Look Out 1979 Casablanca NBLP-7138
- Bailey, Victor Bottom's Up 1989 Atlantic Jazz 7 81978-2
- Baker, Chet You Can't Go Home Again 1977 A&M/Horizon SP-726
- Baker, Chet The Best Thing for You 1977 A&M D22Y3920
- Basile, John John Basile 1995 Paddle Wheel KICJ-235
- Bazuka Bazuka 1975 A&M SP-3406 (3411)
- Beacco, Marc Scampi Fritti 1994 Verve 523 902-2
- Beacco, Marc Tomato Soup 1999 Polydor/Polygram 538 349-2
- Bear, Richard T Red Hot & Blue 1979 RCA 12927
- Beard, Jim Song of the Sun 1991 CTI R2 79478(847926-2)
- Beatle Jazz With a Little Help from My Fiends 2005 Lightyear 54685-2
- Beatnik Rebel Science Featuring Tony Verderosa 1993 CyberJam 7000122
- Beck, Joe Watch the Time 1977 Polydor (US)
- Beck, Joe Friends 1984 DMP CD-446
- Beirach, Richie Some Other Time – A Tribute to Chet Baker 1989 Triloka 180-2
- Belle, Regina Stay with Me 1989 Columbia CK44367
- Benson, George Pacific Fire 1975 CTI CTI-9010
- Benson, George Good King Bad 1975 CTI CTI-6062
- Benson, George Cast Your Fate to the Wind 1976 CTI CTI-8030
- Benson, George In Your Eyes 1983 Warner Bros. 9 23744-2
- Bernsen, Randy Mo' Wasabi 1986 Zebra ZEB-5857
- Black Heat Black Heat 1974 Atlantic SD 18128
- Black Light Orchestra This Time 1979 RCA KKL1-0326
- Blenzig, Charles Say What You Mean 1993 Big World BW2009
- Bliss, Peter Peter Bliss UA 728
- Blue Öyster Cult, Agents of Fortune 1976 Columbia PC34164
- Blue Suede Sneakers Blue Suede Sneakers
- Bluesiana Hot Sauce Bluesiana Hot Sauce 1994 Shanachie 5009
- Bofill, Angela Angie 1978 Arista GRP5000
- Bolin, Tommy From the Archives, Vol. 1 1975 Rhino R2 72194
- Bolton, Michael Soul Provider 1989 Columbia UCOL 45012
- Bona, Richard Scenes from My Life 1999
- Bonfá, Luiz Manhattan Strut 1974 Paddle Wheel KICJ-294
- Bootsy's Rubber Band Ahh... The Name Is Bootsy, Baby! 1977 WP P-10329W
- Bootsy's Rubber Band Stretchin' Out in Bootsy's Rubber Band 1976 Warner Bros. K56200(UK)
- Botti, Chris First Wish 1995 Verve Forecast 314 527 141-2
- Brackeen, Joanne Tring-a-Ling 1977 Choice CHCJ-1023
- Bramblett, Randall That Other Mile Polydor PD6045
- Brecker, Randy Score 1968 Solid State SS-18051
- Brecker, Randy Toe to Toe 1989 MCA MCAD-6334
- Brecker, Randy & Elias, Eliane Amanda 1985 Passport Jazz PJ 88013
- Brecker, Randy Some Skunk Funk 2005 Telarc – recorded in 2003
- Brickell, Edie Picture Perfect Morning 1994 Geffen GEFD-24715
- Brooklyn Dreams Sleepless Nights 1979 RCA 13071
- Brothers Johnson, Blam! 1979 A&M AMLH 64714
- Brown, Dean Here 2000 ESC/EFA 03673
- Brown, James I Got a Bag of My Own (Get on the Good) 1972 Polydor PD23004
- Brown, James Think/Something 1973 Polydor PD14177
- Brown, James Think (Alternate Take) 1973 Polydor PD14185
- Brown, James Slaughter's Big Rip-Off 1973 Polydor PD6015
- Brown, James Reality 1974 Polydor PD6039
- Brown, Peter Back to the Front 1983 RCA AFL1-4604
- Browne, Tom Browne Sugar 1979 Arista-GRP
- Brubeck, Darius Chaplin's Back Paramount PAS-6026
- Brubeck, Dave Young Lions & Old Tigers 1995 Telarc CD-83349
- Brönner, Till Midnight 1997 Button 9005
- Buchanan, Roy A Street Called Straight 1976 Atlantic SD 18170
- Buchanan, Roy Guitar on Fire – The Atlantic Sessions (Compilation) 1993 Rhino 71235-2
- Bullock, Hiram From All Sides 1986 Atlantic 7 81685-2
- Bullock, Hiram Give It What U Got 1987 Atlantic Jazz 7 81790-2
- Burton, Gary Times Like These 1988 GRP GRD-9569
- Butler, Jonathan Deliverance 1990 Jive 1329-2-J
- Butler, Jonathan Head to Head 1994 Mercury PHCR-1294
- Calderazzo, Joey In the Door 1991 Blue Note CDP 7 95138 2
- Calello Orchestra, The Charlie Calello Serenade 1979 Midsong MS1-010
- Cameo Word Up! 1986 Atlanta Artists 830 265-2 M-1
- Cameo Machismo 1988 Chocolate City CCLP-2011
- Cardona, Milton Cambucha (Carmen) 1999 AMCL 1028
- Carillo Street of Dreams 1979 Atlantic SD19235
- Carlton, Larry Friends 1983 Warner Bros. BSK 3635
- Carpenter, Karen Karen Carpenter 1996 A&M 31454-0588-2
- Carpenters, Lovelines 1996 A&M CD-3931
- Carter, Ron Anything Goes 1975 KUDU KU-25
- Casiopea Casiopea 1979 Alfa ALR 6017
- Cavaliere, Felix Destiny 1975 Bearsville K55505(6958)
- Chambers, Dennis Outbreak 2002 ESC/EFA 03682
- Cherry, Don Hear & Now 1976 Atlantic SD-18217
- Chesky Band, The David Rush Hour 1980 Columbia JC 36799
- Chic, Take It Off 1981 Atlantic SD19323
- Chindamo, Joe Reflected Journey 1997 A-Records AL 73120
- Bill Chinnock, Badlands 1978 Atlantic SD19191
- Ciccu, Bianca The Gusch 1989 JC 35336
- Cion, Sarah Jane Summer Night 2001 NAXOS 86071-2
- Circus Wonderful Music 1980 Alfa ALR 6036
- Clapton, Eric August 1986 Warner Bros. 25476-2
- Clayton-Thomas, David David Clayton 1978 ABC Word
- Clerc, Julien 1992
- Clinton, George and the P-Funk All Stars Plush Funk 1980 AEM 25671-2
- Coalkitchen Thirsty or Not..Choose Your Flavor Full Moon PE34827
- Cobham, Billy Crosswinds 1974 Atlantic SD 7300
- Cobham, Billy Total Eclipse 1974 Atlantic P-8539A
- Cobham, Billy Shabazz 1975 Atlantic P-10022A
- Cobham, Billy A Funky Thide of Sings 1975 Atlantic P-10079A
- Cobham, Billy Inner Conflicts 1978 Atlantic P-10530A
- Cole, Natalie Stardust 1996 ELECTR
- Colina, Michael Shadow of Urbano 1988 Private Music 2041-2-P
- Colina, Michael Rituals 1990 Private Music 2062-2-P
- Colombier, Michel Michel Colombier 1979 Chrysalis CHR 1212
- Copeland, Ruth Take Me to Baltimore 1976 RCA APL1-1236
- Copland, Marc Softly... 1998 Savoy Jazz – CY-18076
- Copland, Marc Marc Copland And... 2003 hatOLOGY 593
- Corea, Chick Three Quartets 1981 Warner Bros. BSK 3552
- Corgan, Billy Chicago University Great Hall 1996
- Coryell, Julian Without You 1996 TKCV-35001
- Coryell, Larry Difference 1978 Egg 900-558
- Coryell, Larry (Eleventh House), Aspects 1976 Arista AL 4077
- Costandinos, Alec R. Winds of Change 1979 Casablanca NBLT 7167
- Coster, Tom From the Street 1996 JVC JVC-2053-2
- Crack the Sky Crack the Sky 1975 Lifeson LS-6000
- Crack the Sky Crack Attic (The Best of Crack The Sky) (Compilation) 1997 Renaissance RMED 00182
- Crawford, Hank Tico Rico 1977 Kudu KU-35
- Crowbar Crowbar 1973 Epic 32746
- Cusson, Michael Wild Unit 2 1994 JMS JMS 074-2
- Dalto, Jorge Listen Up! 1978 Gala 139009-1
- Daltrey, Roger Parting Should Be Painless 1984 Warner Bros.
- Dealy Nightshade, The 1975 Phantom BPL1-0955
- Dee, Kiki Kiki Dee 1977 Rocket 2257
- Delano, Peter Peter Delano 1993 Verve 314 519 602-2
- Desmond Child and Rouge 1979 Capitol ST-11908
- Dibango, Manu Gone Clear 1980 Mango MLPS9539
- Dibango, Manu Ambassador 1981 Mango MLPS9658
- Dire Straits, Brothers in Arms 1985 Warner Bros. W2-25264
- DKO The Darren Kramer Organization, In the Now 2005 Rad Remark Music
- Doky Brothers Doky Brothers 1995 Blue Note 8369092
- Doky, Chris Minh Minh 1999 Video Arts VACM-1137
- Dolby's Cube, May the Cube Be With You (12", 2MIX) 1985 Parlophone 2R6100
- Dolby, Thomas Aliens Ate My Buick 1988 EMI-Manhattan CDP-7-48075-2
- Dreams Dreams 1970 Columbia C 3022592
- Dreams Imagine My Surprise 1971 Columbia C 30960
- Drews, J. D. J. D. Drews
- Dudziak, Urezula Sorrow Is Not Forever ... But Love Is 1983 Keystone KYT726
- Earland, Charles Coming to You Live 1980 Columbia JC36449
- Earland, Charles and Odyssey Revelation 1977 Mercury SRM-1-1149
- Eaton, William Struggle Buggy 1977 Marlin 2211
- Eigenberg, Julie Love Is Starting Now 1994 Geronimo PSCW-5075
- Eldar Eldar 2005 Sony Classical SK 92593
- Elias, Eliane So Far So Close 1989 Blue Note CDP 7 91411 2
- Elias, Eliane Eliane Elias Sings Jobim 1998 Blue Note CDP 7243 4 95050 2 5
- Erskine, Peter Peter Erskine 1982 Contemporary 14010
- Erskine, Peter Motion Poet 1988 Denon 32CY-2582
- Everything But The Girl, The Language of Life 1990 Cherry Red VPCK-85056
- Fabulous Rhinestones Free Wheelin' 1973 Just Sunshine JS9
- Faddis, Jon Good and Plenty 1978 Buddha/Versatile BDS5727
- Fagen, Donald, The Nightfly 1982 Warner Bros. 23696-1
- Fagner Fagner 1982 CBS 138250
- Fania All-Stars Spanish Fever 1978 Columbia JC 35336
- Faro, Rachel Refugees
- Farrell, Joe La Catedral Y El Toro 1977 Warner Bros. P-10413W
- Ferber, Mordy Being There 2005 Half Note
- Finnerty, Barry New York City 1982 Victor VIJ-28020
- Finnerty, Barry Lights on Broadway 1984 Morning AM28-1
- Finnerty, Barry Space Age Blues (Compilation) 1998 Hot Wire EFA 12834-2
- Fisher, Bruce Red Hot 1977 Mercury SRMI-1158
- Flying Monkey Orchestra Back in the Pool 1993 Monkeyville MV 60101-2
- Flying Monkey Orchestra Mango Theory 1995 Monkeyville MV 60102-2
- Fogelberg, Dan The Innocent Age 1981 FullMoon/Epic E2K 37393
- Fogelberg, Dan Exiles 1987 Full Moon/Epic OE 40271
- Fonda, Jane Prime Time Workout 1984 Elektra 60382-1
- Forman, Mitchel Train of Thought 1985 Magenta MD-0201
- Foster, Al Mixed Roots 1977 Laurie LES-6002
- Fotomaker Transfer Station 1979 Atlantic SD19246
- Foxy Hot Numbers 1979 T.K. Records TKR 83353
- Franklin, Aretha Aretha 1986 Arista ARCD 8556
- Franks, Michael The Art of Tea 1975 Warner Bros. MS2230
- Franks, Michael Sleeping Gypsy 1976 Warner Bros. P10306W
- Franks, Michael Objects of Desire 1982 Warner Bros. BSK 3648
- Franks, Michael Skin Dive 1985 Warner Bros. 9 25275-2
- Franks, Michael The Camera Never Lies 1987 Warner Bros. 32XD-734
- Franks, Michael Abandoned Garden 1995 Warner Bros. WPCR-400
- Franks, Michael Barefoot on the Beach 1999 Windham Hill 01934-11443-2
- Freeman, Michele Michele Freeman 1979 Polydor PD-1-6222
- Friesen, David Two for the Show 1993 ITM Pacific ITMP 970079
- Frisaura, Lorraine Be Happy for Me 1976 ATV PYE-12141
- Fruuchi, Toko Strength 1995 Sony SRCL 3306
- Fukamachi, Jun Jun Fukamachi Kitty MKY6003
- Fukamachi, Jun Spiral Steps 1976 Kitty MKF-1007
- Fukamachi, Jun Jun Fukamachi Live/Triangle Session 1977 Kitty MKF-1016
- Fukamachi, Jun On the Move 1978 Alfa ALR 6007
- Fukamachi, Jun Jun Fukamachi & N. Y. All Stars Live 1978 Alfa ALR 9002
- Funkadelic The Electric Spanking of War Babies 1981 Warner Bros. BSK3482
- Gadd Gang, The Gadd Gang 1986 A Touch 2-8H-87
- Gaffney, Henry On Again Off Again 1978 Manhattan Island MR-LA861-H
- Gale, Eric Ginseng Woman 1977 Columbia PC 34421
- Galper, Hal Hal Galper Inner City
- Galper, Hal Wild Bird 1971 Mainstream MRL-354
- Galper, Hal The Guerilla Band 1973 Mainstream MRL 337
- Galper, Hal Reach Out! 1977 SteepleChase SCS-1067
- Galper, Hal Redux '78 1978 Concord Jazz CCD-4483
- Galper, Hal Speak with a Single Voice 1982 Enja Enja 4006
- Galper, Hal Quintet Children of the Night 1997 Double-Time DTRCD-125
- Garfunkel, Art Up 'Til Now (Compilation) Columbia
- Garfunkel, Art Fate for Breakfast 1979 CBS 35780
- Garfunkel, Art Scissors Cut 1981 CBS 37392
- Garfunkel, Art Lefty 1986 Columbia CK40942
- Garfunkel, Art Across America (Compilation) 1996 Hybrid HY20001
- Gatto, Roberto Notes 1988 Break Time BRJ-4067
- Gaynor, Gloria Experience Gloria Gaynor 1975 MGM 2353119
- Geils (The J. Geils Band) Monkey Island 1977 Atlantic 19130
- Genoud, Moncef Aqua 2004 M&I MYCJ-30337
- Gibb, Andy After Dark 1980 RSO
- Gibb, Barry Now Voyager 1984 Polydor 25MM0385
- Gibbs, Mike & Burton, Gary The Public Interest 1973 Polydor 6503
- Gomez, Eddie Discovery 1985 Columbia CK 40548
- Gomez, Eddie Mezgo 1986 Epic Sony/A Touch 32.8H-65
- Gomez, Eddie Power Play 1988 Epic Sony/A Touch 32.8H-5004
- Gomez, Ray Volume 1980 Columbia JC 36243
- Googie And Tom Coppola Shine the Light of Love 1980 Columbia NJC36194
- Gray, Mark Boogie Hotel 1982 TDK T28P-1002
- Gray, Mark & Super Friends The Silencer 1984 East World EWJ-90032
- Green, Grant The Main Attraction 1976 Kudu KU-29
- Grimes, Carol Carol Grimes 1977 Decca SKLR5258
- Grolnick, Don Hearts and Numbers Hip Pocket HD106
- Grolnick, Don Weaver of Dreams 1990 Blue Note CDP 7 94591 2
- Grolnick, Don Medianoche 1995 Sweeca PCCY-00761
- Grolnick, Don The London Concert PEPCD008
- GRP All-Star Big Band All Blues GRP 98002
- Gross, Henry What's in a Name 1981 Capitol/EMI ST-12113
- Grusin, Dave West Side Story 1997 Encoded Music N2K-10021
- Haden, Charlie American Dreams 2002 Universal 064 096
- Hall, John John Hall 1978 Asylum 6E-117
- Hammer, Jan Drive 1994 Miramar MPCD2501
- Hancock, Herbie Magic Windows 1981 CBS FC37387
- Hancock, Herbie The Herbie Hancock Quartet Live 1994 Jazz Door 1270
- Hancock, Herbie The New Standard 1996 Verve 527 715-2
- Hancock, Herbie The New Standard Special Edition 1996 Verve POCJ-9091/2
- Hara, Kumiko No Smoking 1977 Kitty MKF1027
- Harris, Allen Oceans Between Us 1978 CBS 82844
- Hayashida, Kenji Marron 1995 Victor VICL-765
- Heirs To Jobim A Tribute to Antonio Carlos Jobim 1995 BV. BVCR-1422
- High Inergy, Hold On 1980 Gordy G8-996M1
- Hino, Terumasa Day Dream 1980 Flying Disk VIJ-28003
- Hino, Terumasa New York Times 1983 CS 35DH50
- Hinze, Chris Parcival 1976 Philips 6629006
- Hinze, Chris Senang 1996 Keytone KYT 794 CD
- Hinze, Chris Combination Bamboo Magic 1977 Atlantic SD 19185
- Holliday, Jennifer I'm on Your Side 1991 Arista 18578-2
- Holmes, Rupert Pursuit of Happiness 1980 MCA 3241
- Horne, Lena The Lady and Her Music – Live on Broadway 1981 Qwest 2QW3597
- Horny Horns, The Final Blow 1980 PV PCD-2767
- Hubbard, Freddie Windjammer 1976 Columbia PC-34166
- Hue and Cry Remote 1988 Circa VJD-32103
- Hue and Cry JazzNotJazz 1996 Linn akd 057
- Ide, Yasuaki Cool Blue 1995 Ki/oon Sony KSC2 120
- Imada, Masaru Carnival 1981 Trio/Full House PAP-25009
- Irvine, Weldon Sinbad 1976 RCA APL1-1363
- Ish Ish Clouds 1976 8808
- Itoh, Kimiko A Touch of Love 1986 Epic Sony/A Touch 32.8H-66
- Itoh, Kimiko For Lovers Only 1987 Epic Sony/A Touch 32.8H-136
- Itoh, Kimiko Standards My Way 1993 VideoArts Music VACV-1008
- Itoh, Kimiko Sophisticated Lady 1995 VideoArts Music VACV-1021
- James, Bob Heads 1977 Columbia JC 34896
- James, Bob Lucky Seven 1979 Columbia 36056
- James, Bob The Genie 1983 Tappan Zee
- James, Bob Obsession 1986 Warner Bros. 9 25495-2
- James, Bob Grand Piano Canyon 1990 Warner Bros. 9 26256-2
- James, Bob Restless 1994 Warner Bros. 9 45536-2
- James, Mark Mark James
- James, Rick Come Get It! 1978 Gordy G7-981R1
- James, Rick Bustin' Out of L Seven 1979 Gordy G7-984R1
- James, Tommy Three Times in Love 1980 RVC RVP-6471
- Jarreau, Al Tenderness 1994 Reprise 9 45422-2
- Jeffreys, Garland Ghost Writer 1977 A&M SP-4629
- Jeffreys, Garland One-Eyed Jack 1978 A&M SP-4681
- Jeffreys, Garland Escape Artist 1980 Epic 36983
- Jeffreys, Garland Don't Call Me Buckwheat 1991 RCA PD 90588
- Joel, Billy 52nd Street 1978 Columbia FC 35609
- Joel, Billy An Innocent Man 1983 Columbia CK 38837
- Joel, Billy The Bridge 1986 Columbia CK 40402
- John, Elton Blue Moves 1976 MCA MCAD 6011
- Johnson, Michael Dialogue 1979 EMI America SW-17010
- Jonah Jonah 1974 20th Cent T-456
- Jones, Quincy Sounds...and Stuff Like That!! 1978 A&M SP 4685
- Jospe Inner Rhythm, Robert Blue Blaze
- Kadomatsu, Toshiki Before the Daylight 1988 BV M32D-1001
- Karizma (Forever in the) Arms of Love 1989 SOHBI/Creatchy SFB-1001
- Kasai, Kimiko My One and Only Love 1986 CBS Sony 32DH-51
- Kasai, Kimiko My Favorite Songs No. 1 (Compilation) 1999 Sony SRCS-8991
- Kawasaki, Ryo Mirror of My Mind 1979 Open Sky 25AP-1021
- Kenia Initial Thrill Zebra
- Khan, Chaka Chaka 1978 Warner Bros. BSK 3245
- Khan, Chaka Naughty 1980 Warner Bros. BSK 3385
- Khan, Chaka What Cha' Gonna Do for Me 1981 Warner Bros. HS 3526
- Khan, Chaka Chaka Khan 1982 Warner Bros. 92.3729-1
- Khan, Chaka Destiny 1986 Warner Bros. 925425-1
- Khan, Steve Tightrope 1977 Tappan Zee 1977
- Khan, Steve The Blue Man 1978 Columbia JC 35539
- Khan, Steve Arrows 1979 Columbia JC 36129
- Khan, Steve Crossings 1994 Verve
- King, Carole City Streets 1989 Capitol C1-90885
- Kishino, Yoshiko Fairy Tale 1995 GRP MVCR-30001
- Kishino, Yoshiko Randezvous 1997 Universal Victor MVCJ-2901
- Kleeer Winners 1979 Atlantic SD19262
- Kleeer The Very Best of Kleer (Compilation) 1998 Rhino R2 75218
- Klugh, Earl Life Stories 1986 Warner Bros. 9 25478-2
- Knight, Gladys & The Pips Midnight Train to Georgia 1973
- Knight, Gladys & The Pips About Love 1980 Columbia JC38367
- Knight, Holly Holly Knight 1989 Columbia FC44243
- Knopfler, Mark Local Hero (Original Sound Track) 1983 Vertigo 811 038-2
- Kubota, Toshinobu Neptune 1992 Sony SRCL2429
- Kühn, Joachim Nightline New York 1981 Inak 869
- Kühn, Joachim Survivor 2005 ASOJ QSCA-1028
- Kühn, Rolf Inside Out 1999 Int 3276
- Larsen, Neil Jungle Fever 1978 A&M/Horizon SP-733
- Larsen, Neil High Gear 1979 A&M/Horizon SP-738
- Larsen, Neil Through Any Window 1987 MCA MCAD-42018
- Last, James Band Seduction 1980 Polydor MP-2625
- Lateef, Yusef In a Temple Garden 1979 CTI
- Lawrence, Mike Nightwind 1988 Optimism 3104
- Laws, Hubert The Chicago Theme 1974 CTI CTI-6058
- Lebous, Martee The Lady Wants to Be a Star Image IM-301
- Ledford, Mark Miles 2 Go 1998 Verve Forecast POCJ-1402
- Lee, Will Bird House 2002 SKP 9026
- Lee, John & Brown, Garry Still Can't Say Enough 1976 Blue Note 701
- Leer, Thijs van Nice to Have Met You 1978 CBS 86059
- Lennon, John Mind Games 1973 Apple 3414
- Lennon, John Absolutely Elsewhere 1998 Vigotone VT-156-B
- Lennon, Julian Valotte 1984 Atlantic A1-80184
- Leonhart, Jay & Friends Live at Fat Tuesday's 1993 DRG DRG 8439
- Lewis, Mel Mel Lewis and Friends 1977 A&M/Horizon SP-716
- Lieberman, Lori Letting Go 1978 Millennium MNLP8005
- Lippert, Jan Hard Company Imprints 1999 Storyville STCD4228
- Little Feat Representing the Mambo 1990 Warner Bros. 9 26163-2
- Little River Band Too Late to Load EMI Australia CDP791693
- Lloyd, Ian Goose Bumps 1979 Scotti Brothers 7104
- Loeb, Chuck Life Colors 1990 dmp CD-475
- Loeb, Chuck The Music Inside 1996 Shanachie 5022
- Loggins, Kenny Keep the Fire 1979 CBS 36172
- Longmire, Wilbert Champagne 1979 Tappan Zee JC 35754
- Lynn, Cheryl In Love 1979 CBS 83829
- McCord, Kat Baby Come Out Tonight 1979 Mercury 9124 383
- MacDonald, Ralph The Path 1978 Marlin 2210
- MacDonald, Ralph Counter Point 1979 Marlin 2229
- MacDonald, Ralph Just the Two of Us 1996 Video Arts VACM-1116
- Mack, Jimmy On the Corner 1979 Atlantic BT 76014
- Mahogany, Kevin My Romance 1998 Warner Bros. 9 47025-2
- Mainieri, Mike Love Play 1977 Arista
- Mainieri, Mike Wanderlust 1981 Warner Bros. BSK 3586
- Manchester, Melissa Emergency 1983 Arista AL8-8094
- Mandoki, Leslie People in Room No. 8 Polydor 537 213-2
- Mandoki, Leslie People 1993 BMG 74321 182402
- Mandoki, Leslie The Jazz Cuts 1997 Polymedia 537 267-2
- Manhattan Transfer Anthology: Down in Birdland (Compilation) 1992 Rhino R2 71053
- Manhattan Transfer The Manhattan Transfer 1975 Atlantic SD-18133
- Manhattan Transfer Coming Out 1976 Atlantic SD-18183
- Mann, Herbie Yellow Fever 1979 Atlantic SD 19252
- Mann, Herbie Mellow 1981 Atlantic SD16046
- Marcovitz, Diana Joie De Vivre! 1976 Kama Sutra KSBS2614
- Mardin, Arif Journey 1974 Atlantic SD1661
- Marsh, Hugh The Bear Walks 1986 VeraBra No.11
- Mason, Robert Star Drive Elektra EKS 75058E
- Master Mind Prelude RCA IC-30807
- Masuda, Mikio Going Away 1979 Electric Bird SKS 8011
- Masuo, Yoshiaki Song is You and Me 1980 Electric Bird KICJ-2004
- Matthews, David Shoogie Wanna Boogie 1976 KUDU 30
- Matthews, David Digital Love 1980 Electric Bird SKS 8010
- Matthews, David Grand Cross 1981 Electric Bird K22P 6068
- Matthews, David Super Funky Sax 1984 GNPS 2169
- Mauriat, Paul Overseas Call 1978 Mercury SRM-1-3746
- Mayall, John Bottom Line 1979 DJM 23
- McCoo, Marilyn & Billy Davis Jr. Marilyn & Billy 1978 Columbia JC35603
- McGriff, Jimmy Red Beans 1976 Groove Merchant GM-3324
- McLaughlin, John The Promise 1995 Verve 529 828-2
- Melanie Phonogenic 1978 Midsong 3033
- Mendoza Project, The Mardin Jazz Pana 1993 Zero XRCN-1034
- Mendoza, Vince Vince Mendoza 1989 Fun House 32GD-7022
- Mendoza, Vince Epiphany 1997 ZebraAcoustic ZA 44407-2
- Mercury, Eric Gimme a Call Sometime 1981 Capitol ST-12166
- Pat Metheny, 80/81 1980 ECM ECM 1180
- Midler, Bette Songs for the New Depression 1976 Atlantic SD18155
- Midler, Bette Thighs and Whispers 1979 Atlantic SD16004
- Miles, Jason World Tour 1994 Lipstick LIP8921
- Miles, Jason Mr. X 1996 Lightyear 54170-2
- Miles, Jason Miles to Miles 2005 Narada Jazz 072435-60601-2-8
- Mingus, Charles Me, Myself An Eye 1978 Atlantic SD-8803
- Mingus, Charles Something Like a Bird 1980 Atlantic SD-8805
- Mintzer, Bob Papa Lips 1984 CBS Sony 28AP-2881
- Mintzer, Bob Twin Tenors 1994 Novus (BMG Victor) BVCJ-605
- Mintzer, Bob Big Band Incredible Journey 1985 DMP CD-451
- Mitchell, Joni, Shadows and Light 1980 Asylum BB-704
- Miyake, Jun Especially Sexy 1984 TDK T28P-1005
- Moffett, Charnett Net Man 1987 Blue Note CJ32-5001
- Monheit, Jane Come Dream with Me 2002 Columbia 509477 2
- Morris, Russel Russell Morris 1975 RCA APLI-1073B
- Mouzon, Alphonse Morning Sun 1981 Pausa 7107
- Mouzon, Alphonse Distant Lover 1982 Highrise HR100AE
- Move To Groove The Best of 1970's Jazz-Funk 1972 Verve
- Muhammad, Idris House of the Rising Sun 1976 KUDU KU-27
- Muhammad, Idris Turn This Mutha Out 1977 KUDU KU-34
- Muldaur, Jenni Jenni Muldaur 1993 Warner Bros. 26862-2
- Mulligan, Gerry Little Big Horn 1983 GRP GRD-9503
- Murata, Yoich Solid Brass What's Bop? 1997 JVC VIC J-227
- Murphy, Elliott Night Lights 1976 RCA APLI-1318
- Murphy, Mark Stolen & Other Moments (Compilation) 1997 32Jazz 32036
- Murphy, Mark Bridging a Gap 1973 Muse MR5009
- Murphy, Mark Mark Murphy Sings 1975 Muse MR5078
- Nakagawa, Eijiro Peace 1998 Paddle Wheel (King) KICJ 333
- Nakamura, Teruo Super Friends 1985 East World EWJ-90039
- National Lampoon National Lampoon 1975 PE 33956
- Nelson, Willie Across the Borderline 1993 Columbia CK 52752
- New Sounds in Brass New Sounds Special II 1998 EMI TOCZ-9317
- New Yorkers I Believe in Love (7") 1980 WP P-634W
- Nguini, Vincent Symphony-Bantu 1994 Mesa R2 79067
- Nightingale, Maxine Lead Me On 1979 Windsong BXL1-3404
- Nils Landgren Funk Unit Paint It Blue 1996 Act 9243-2
- Niteflyte Niteflyte 1979 Ariola America
- Nock, Mike In Out and Around 1978 Timeless SJP119
- Nogitish, Uganda Forgotten Love Is Dead 1979 Columbia 33331
- Noguchi, Goro GORO in New York 1977 Taurus TACX-2448
- Norby, Cæcilie My Corner of the Sky 1996 EMI-Blue Note 8534222
- Nyro, Laura Smile 1976 Columbia 33912
- Nyro, Laura Walk the Dog and Light the Light 1993 Columbia
- O'Connor, Mark On the Mark 1989 W.B. 925
- Odyssey Odyssey 1977 RCA APL1-2204
- Odyssey I Got the Melody 1981 RCA AFL1-3910
- Ogerman, Claus Gate of Dreams 1976 Warner Bros. 3006-2
- Ogerman, Claus Featuring Michael Brecker GRP 9632
- Ohnuki, Taeko Copine 1985 MIL-1004
- Ono, Lisa Essencia 1997 EMI TOCT-9999
- Ono, Yoko Walking on Thin Ice (Compilation)
- Ono, Yoko Onobox
- Ono, Yoko Feeling the Space 1973 Apple EW3412
- Ono, Yoko A Story 1974 Rykodisc VACK-5376
- Ono, Yoko Season of Glass 1981 Geffen 2004
- Orleans Still the One (Compilation)
- Orleans Waking and Dreaming 1976 Asylum 7E-1070
- Osmond, Donny Donny Osmond 1988 Virgin CDV2469
- Osmond, Donny Eyes Don't Lie 1990 TE. TOCP-6442
- Pacific Gas & Electric Starring Charie Allen 1973 Dunhil 157
- Pages Pages 1978 Epic PE 35459
- Pages Future Street 1979 Epic PE 36209
- Palmer, Robert Double Fun 1978 Island ILPS9476(UK)
- Palmieri, Eddie Listen Here! 2005 Concord CCD-2276-2
- Pao, Eugene Outlet 1990 Wea 9031-72853-2
- Pao, Eugene By the Company You Keep 1996 Somethin' Else 5577
- Pao, Eugene Naked Time FPP 200403
- Parliament Mothership Connection 1976 Casablanca 7022
- Parliament The Clones of Dr. Funkenstein 1976 Casablanca 7034
- Parliament Trombipulation 1980 Casablanca NBLP7249
- Paris, Mica If You Could Love Me 2004 Wounded Bird WOU 5000
- Pasqua, Alan Milagro 1994 SoundHills SSCD 8058
- Pasqua, Alan Delications 1995 Postcards 1212
- Pastorius, Jaco Jaco Pastorius 1975 Epic PE 33949
- Pastorius, Jaco Word of Mouth 1981 Warner Bros. BSK 3535
- Pastorius, Jaco The Birthday Concert 1995 Warner Bros. 9362-45290-2
- Patitucci, John John Patitucci 1988 GRP GRD-9560
- Patitucci, John On the Corner 1989 GRP GRD-9583
- Patitucci, John Sketchbook 1990 GRP GRD-9617
- Patitucci, John Another World 1993 GRP GRD-9725
- Patitucci, John One More Angel 1997 Concord CCD-4753-2
- Patitucci, John Now 1998 Concord CCD-4806-2
- Pavlov's Dog At the Sound of the Bell 1976 CBS 33694
- Phillips, Esther What a Diff'rence a Day Makes 1975 Kudu KU-23
- Phillips, Esther Performance 1975 Kudu 18
- Phillips, Esther For All We Know 1976 Kudu 28(UK)
- Phillips, Esther Capricorn Princess 1977 Kudu 31(UK)
- Players Association Born to Dance 1978 Vanguard VSD79398
- Players Association Turn the Music Up 1979 Vanguard VSD79421
- Pommer, Georg Coast to Coast 1995 Button 9001
- Pope, Odean Locked & Loaded 2006 Half Note 4526
- Prairie Madness Prairie Madness 1971 Columbia 31003
- Pratt, Andy Shiver in the Night 1977 Nemperor NE443
- Purdie, Bernard Soul to Jazz 1996 ACT 9242-2
- Purim, Flora Everyday Everynight 1978 Milestone M9084
- Pussez! Leave That Boy Alone! 1980 Vanguard VSD79433
- Rainbow featuring Will Boulware Crystal Green 1978 East Wind EW-8501
- Rainbow, Will Boulware Over Crystal Green 2002 FFO 0015
- Ramblerny School 66 (Summer Big Band Camp) 1966
- Rangell, Nelson Members Only 1987 Muse MCD 5332
- Rankin, Kenny Here in My Heart 1997 Private Music 0100582148-2
- Rare Silk New Weave 1983 Polydor(E) 810 028-2
- Lou Reed, Between Thought and Expression: The Lou Reed Anthology
- Lou Reed, Berlin 1973 RCA 10207
- Lou Reed, New Sensations Word RCA AFL1-4998
- Reedus, Tony & Urban Relations People Get Ready 1998 Sweet Basil TECW-25733
- Reynolds, L.J. L. J. Reynolds 1991 Bellmark 77003
- Rezza, Vito Drums of Avila 2004 Alma ACD14302
- Rhodes, Rick Indian Summer 1995 Geronimo PSCW-5319
- Rhodes, Rick Deep in the Night 1998 Award 80001
- Riel, Alex Unriel 1997 Stunt STUCD19707
- Ritchie Family Bad Reputation 1979 Casablanca
- Rivera, Scarlet Scarlet Fever 1978 Warner Bros. BSK 3174
- Roney, Wallace Village 1997 Warner Bros.
- Ross, Diana Red Hot Rhythm & Blues 1987 RCA 6388-1-R
- Ross, Diana The Boss 1979 Motown STML12118(UK)
- Ross, Diana Why Do Fools Fall in Love 1981 Capitol 26733(UK)
- Ross, Diana Swept Away 1984 RCA AFL1-5009
- Rubalcaba, Gonzalo Inner Voyage 1999 Blue Note
- Rundgren, Todd Something/Anything? 1972 Warner Bros. 2BX 2066
- Rundgren, Todd A Wizard, A True Star 1973 Bearsville 2133
- Rundgren, Todd Todd 1974 Bearsville 6952
- Saint & Stephanie Saint & Stephanie
- Salvatore, Sergio Tune Up 1994 GRP GRD-9846
- Salvatore, Sergio Point of Presence 1997 N2K Encoded Music N2K-10018
- Sanborn, David Inside 1999 Elektra 7559-62346-2
- Sanborn, David Taking Off 1975 Warner Brother BS 2873
- Sanborn, David Heart to Heart 1978 Warner Brother BSK 3189
- Sanborn, David Straight to the Heart 1984 Warner Brother 9 25150 2
- Sanborn, David A Change of Heart 1987 Warner Brother W1-25479
- Sandke, Randy New York Stories 1986 Stash ST-264
- Sandke, Randy The Sandke Brothers (Compilation) 1993 Stash CD-575
- Sandke, Randy Chase 1995 Concord CCD-4642
- Sandoval, Arturo Swingin' 1996
- Sandoval, Arturo Hot House 1998 N2K 10023
- Santamaría, Mongo Red Hot 1979 Tappan Zee
- Satten, Steve Whatcha Gonna Do for Me? 1975 Columbia PC33478
- Saxophone Summit Gathering of Spirits Telarc CD-83607
- Schlitz, Don Dreamers Matinee 1980
- Sebesky, Don The Rape of El Morro 1975 CTI CTI-6061
- Section 72 Section 72 Warner Bros. BS2661
- Seifert, Zbigniew Zbigniew Seifert Capitol 11618
- Sidran, Ben Free in America 1976 Arista AL4081
- Sidran, Ben Live at Montreux 1978 Arista AB4218 92
- Sidran, Ben The Cat and the Hat 1979 A&M/Horizon LJ741
- Siegel, Janis The Tender Trap 1999 MONA-1021
- Silver, Horace The Best of Horace Silver Volume Two 1972 Blue Note CDP 7 93206 2
- Silver, Horace In Pursuit of the 27th Man 1972 Blue Note LA054-F
- Silver, Horace The Hardbop Grandpop 1996 Impulse! IMPD-192
- Silver, Horace A Prescription for the Blues 1997 Impulse! IMPD-238
- Simon & Garfunkel Old Friends 1993 Print 001/002
- Simon, Carly Coming Around Again 1987 Arista A32D-11
- Simon, Carly Romulus Hunt: A Family Opera 1993 Angel CDQ 54915 2
- Simon, Carly Hotcakes 1974 Elektra 75049
- Simon, Carly Boys in the Trees 1978 Elektra
- Simon, Carly Spy 1979 Elektra 5E506
- Simon, Carly Torch 1981 Warner Brother 3592
- Simon, Carly Hello Big Man 1983 Warner Brother 23866-1
- Simon, Carly Greatest Hits Live 1988 Arista A32D-58
- Simon, Carly My Romance 1990 Arista ARCD-8582
- Simon, Carly Have You Seen Me Lately 1990 Arista ARCD-8650
- Simon, Harris New York Connection 1978 Jimco Music EWCD 701
- Simon, Harris Swish 1980 Jimco Music EWCD 710
- Simon, John Out on the Street 1992 Pioneer LDC PICP-1001
- Simon, Paul Still Crazy After All These Years 1975 CBS 33540
- Simon, Paul The Rhythm of the Saints 1990 Warner Bros. 9 26098-2
- Simon, Paul Paul Simon's Concert in the Park 1991 Warner Bros. 26737-2
- Simon, Paul Live USA 1991 imm 40.90149
- Simon, Paul Paul Simon 1992 Pluto PLR CD9229
- Simone Seducao 1988 CBS 231157
- Sinatra, Frank L.A. Is My Lady 1984 Qwest/WarnerBrothers 25145-1
- Sivertsen, Kenneth Remembering North 1994 NYC NYC 6007-2
- SIXUN Lunatic Taxi 1995 Verve 528 785-2
- SMAP 006 SEXY SIX 1994 Victor VICL 540
- SMAP 007 Gold Singer 1995 Victor VICL 671
- SMAP 008 Tacomax 1996 Victor VICL 745
- SMAP 009 1996 Victor VICL-800
- SMAP WOOL (Compilation) 1997 JVC VICL-40212/3
- Smappies Rhythmsticks 1996 Victor VICP8165
- Smappies Smappies II 1999 JVC VICP60719
- Smith, Michael The Big Picture 1985 Reunion 66166-2
- Snow, Phoebe Against the Grain 1978
- Snow, Phoebe Never Letting Go 1977
- SOS All Stars, The New York Rendezvous 1987 CMG 8001
- Spinners Love Trippin' 1980 Atlantic SD19270
- Spinozza, David Spinozza 1977 A&M SP-4677
- Springsteen, Bruce Born to Run 1975 CBS 33795
- Spyro Gyra Morning Dance 1979 MCA MCAD 37148
- Spyro Gyra Carnaval 1980 MCA MCA-5149
- Spyro Gyra Freetime 1981 MCA MCA-5238
- Stardrive Intergalactic Trot 1973 Elektra EK75058
- Stark & McBrian Big Star
- Starr, Ringo Ringo's Rotogravure 1975 Atlantic SD 18193
- Starr, Ringo Ringo the 4th 1977 Polydor ATCO19108
- Staton, Candi Young Hearts Run Free
- Staton, Candi Candi Staton 1980 W.B. BSK3428
- Staton, Candi Chance 1979 W.B. BSK3333
- Steely Dan Gold (Compilation) 1982 MCA MCF3145
- Steely Dan, Gaucho 1980 MCA MCAD 37220
- Stern, Mike Time in Place 1988 Atlantic Jazz 7 81840-2
- Stern, Mike Jigsaw 1989 Atlantic Jazz 7 82027-2
- Stern, Mike Is What It Is 1994 Atlantic Jazz 82571-2
- Stern, Mike Give and Take 1997 Atlantic 7567-83036-2
- Stern, Mike Voices 2001 Atlantic 7567-83483-2
- Stones, Time & Elements A Humanist Requiem 1994 DIGITAL NPD 85573
- Stone Alliance Heads Up 1980 PM K-149
- Sunshine Sunshine 1977 Roulette SR3018
- Super Nova Brazilian Jazz - The Music and Lyrics of Claudia Villela 1998 Jazzhead JH 9504
- Superfriends Taste of Superfriends 1992
- Syms, Sylvia She Loves to Hear the Music 1978 A&M SP-4696
- T-Square and Friends Miss You in New York 1995 Sony SRCL-3330
- Takahashi, Mariko Couplet 1994 Victor VICL-558
- Taylor, James One Man Dog 1972 Warner Bros. 2660
- Taylor, James Walking Man 1974 Warner Bros. B523794
- Taylor, James In the Pocket 1976 Warner Bros. 2912
- Taylor, James That's Why I'm Here 1985 Columbia CK 40052
- Taylor, James Never Die Young 1988 Columbia CK 40851
- Taylor, James New Moon Shine 1991 Columbia CK 46038
- Taylor, James Hourglass 1997 Columbia CK 67912
- Taylor, Kate Kate Taylor 1978 Columbia PC35089
- Tee, Richard Strokin' 1978 Tappan Zee JC 35695
- Terrason, Jacky What It Is 1998 Blue Note 7243 4 98756 2 3
- Third World Serious Business 1989 MME. PHCR-4742
- Third World Reggae Ambassadors: 20th Anniversary (Compilation)
- Thomas, B. J. Longhorns & Londonbridges 1974 Paramount 1020
- Thomas, Joe Feelin's from Within 1976 Groove Merchant GM-3315
- Thursday Diva Follow Me 1995 Dmp CD-509
- Tolvan Big Band Colours
- Tomlinson, Malcom Coming Outta Nowhere
- Tornader Hit It Again 1977 Polydor PL1 6098
- Tramaine The Search Is Over 1986 A&M 395110-1
- Tropea, John Tropea 1976 Marlin 2200
- Tropea, John Short Trip to Space 1977 T. K. 14061
- Tropea, John To Touch You Again 1978 Marlin 2222
- Turner, Tina Love Explosion 1978 Ariola 206543
- Two Siberians Out of Nowhere 2005 Heads Up HUCD 3096
- Tyler, Bonnie Secret Dreams and Forbidden Fire 1986 Columbia OC 40312
- Tyner, McCoy Trio Featuring Michael Brecker Infinity 1995 Impluse! IMPD-17
- UZEB Fast Emotion 1982 Cream CR 0 22-2
- Urbanator Urbanator 1994 Hip Bop HIBD8001
- Valli, Frankie Lady Put the Light Out 1977 PrivateStock PS7002
- Vandross, Luther Forever, for Always, for Love 1982 Epic FE38235
- Vannoni, Ornella Ornella E... 1986 CGD 21219
- Various Artists It Happened in ... Pescara 1969–1989 Philology W100/101
- Various Artists The Atlantic Family Live at Montreux 1978 Atlantic SD2-3000
- Various Artists Montreux Jazz Festival – 25th Anniversary 1981 Warner WE888
- Various Artists Brastilava Jazz Days 1987 Opus (Cz) OE5549
- Various Artists A Homeless Children's Medical Benefit Concert 1987 Yellow Cat YC 013/14
- Various Artists Jazz Pizazz 1991 Novus/Bluebird/RCA RDJ 61083-2
- Various Artists The Fabulous Pescara Jam Sessions 1970–1975 1991 Philology W96-2
- Various Artists Two Rooms: Celebrating the Songs of Elton John & Bernie Taupin 1991 Polydor 845 750-2
- Various Artists Casino Lights – Live at Montreux (CD Only) 1993 Warner Bros. 23718-2
- Various Artists It's a Jazz Thing 1993 EVA 74321181512
- Various Artists Pazz and Jops 1994 1994 GRP MVCR-164
- Various Artists Jazz to the World 1995 Blue Note CDP 7243 8 32127 2 9
- Various Artists For Our Children Too 1996 Kid Rhino R2 72494
- Various Artists Who Loves You – A Tribute to Jaco Pastorius 1998 JVC VICJ-60185
- Vázquez, Papo At the Point V. One 1999 Cubop CBCD015
- Vick, Harold - After the Dance 1977 WOLF 1202
- Vollenweider, Andreas Kryptos 1997 Sony Classical
- Voudouris, Roger Radio Dream 1979 W.B. BSK3290
- Walden, Narada Michael Awakening 1979 Atlantic SD19222
- Walden, Chris Orchestra Ticino 1996 ACT 9229-2
- Waldman, Randy Wigged Out
- Watanabe, Kazumi To Chi Ka 1980 Better Days YX-7265ND
- Watanabe, Kazumi MOBO (DISK 1/2) 1983 Trio/Domo AW-20006/7
- Watanabe, Kazumi Mobo (Complete Original) 1986 Domo H60P-20121
- Watanabe, Kazumi Mobo Splash 1985 Domo H33P-20050
- Watanabe, Misato Spirits 1996 EPIC/Sony ESCB1742
- Watanabe, Sadao Morning Island 1979 Flying Disk VIJ-6018
- Watts, Jeff "Tain" Bar Talk Columbia 508157 2
- Weckl, Dave Master Plan 1990 GRP GRD-9619
- Wendroff, Michael Michael Wendroff 1973 Buddha BDS5130
- Wesley, Fred & The Horny Horns A Blow for Me, a Toot to You 1977 Atlantic SD-18214
- Kenny Wheeler, Double, Double You 1983 ECM ECM 1262
- White Elephant White Elephant 1972 Just Sunshine JSS-3000
- White, Lenny Present Tense 1996 Hip Bop HIBD 8004
- White, Lenny Renderers of Spirit 1996 Omagatoki
- White, Michael Project 3 Take That 1997 Pony Canyon PCCY-01155
- Whitlock, Amber The Colours of Life 2005 Sketchin
- Whitlock, Rob Sketchin' 2005 Sketchin
- Whitlock, Rob Sketchin' 2 2006 Sketchin
- Wild Cherry Electrified Funk 1977
- Wild Cherry I Love My Music 1978 Epic 35011
- Wilkins, Jack You Can't Live Without It 1976 Chiaroscuro CR 185
- Wilkins, Jack Merge (Compilation) 1992 Chiaroscuro CR 156
- Wilkins, Jack Reunion 2001 Chiaroscuro
- Williams, Patrick New York Band 10th Avenue 1987 Soundwings SWD-2103
- Williams, TonyThe Joy of Flying 1979 CBS JC35705
- Williams, Tony Wilderness 1996 ARK21 72438 54571 2 8
- Winkel, de Torsten Mastertouch 1989 Optimism OP CD-321
- Winter, Johnny John Dawson Winter III 1974 Blue Sky 33292
- Writers, The All in Fun 1979 Columbia JL 35768
- XL Jukola 1998 Pohjola PELPCD 10
- Yonekura, Toshinori Cool Jamz 1995 Pioneer LDC (Japan)
- Yoshida, Minako Light 'n Up 1982 Alfa ALR28040
- Yoshida, Miwa Beauty and Harmony 1995 Epic/Sony ESCB1710
- Frank Zappa, Zappa in New York 1976 Warner Bros. 2D 2290
- Zappa, Frank Läther 1976 Rykodisc RCD10574/76
- Zappa, Frank Leatherette/1977 1977 Four Aces FAR008
- Zappa, Frank You Can't Do That on Stage Anymore, Vol. 6 1992 Ryokodisc RCD10571/72
- Zonjic, Alexander Romance With You 1988 Optimism OP CD3207
