= The Brecker Bros. Collection, Vol 1 =

Compilation album by Brecker Brothers
- Released: February 1990
- Recorded: 1975–1981
- Genre: Jazz fusion, jazz funk
- Label: Novus
- Producer: Michael Cuscuna; The Brecker Brothers

Brecker Brothers chronology
Straphangin' (1981)	The Brecker Bros. Collection, Vol 1 (1990)	The Brecker Bros. Collection, Vol 2 (1991)

Randy Brecker chronology
Live at Sweet Basil (1988)	The Brecker Bros. Collection, Vol 1 (1990)	Toe to Toe (1990)

Michael Brecker chronology
Straphangin' (1981)	The Brecker Bros. Collection, Vol 1 (1990)	Now You See It… (Now You Don't) (1990)

Professional ratings
Review scores
Source	Rating
Allmusic	4/5 stars
The Penguin Guide to Jazz	2/4 stars

The Brecker Bros. Collection, Vol 1 is a compilation album by the American jazz fusion group, the Brecker Brothers. It was released by Novus Records in 1990. A second compilation, The Brecker Bros. Collection, Vol 2, was released in 1991.

== Reception ==
AllMusic awarded the album with 4 stars and its review by Scott Yanow states: "There are some strong moments on the best-of disc, particularly the ballad "Dream Theme". The die-hard Brecker Brothers fans will prefer to get the complete sessions on the original LPs, but this makes a nice sampler for casual fans".

== Track listing ==
1. "Skunk Funk" (Randy Brecker) — 5:00
2. "Sponge" (Randy Brecker) — 4:00
3. "Squids" (Randy Brecker) — 7:45
4. "Funky Sea, Funky Dew" (Michael Brecker) — 6:11
5. "Inside Out" (Randy Brecker) — 9:27
6. "Dream Theme" (Michael Brecker) — 5:37
7. "I Don't Know Either" (Michael Brecker) — 5:47
8. "Bathsheba" (Michael Brecker) — 7:00
9. "Straphangin'" (Michael Brecker) — 8:05
10. "Threesome" (Randy Brecker) — 6:21
11. "East River" (Neil Jason, Bret Mazur, Kash Monet) — 3:33

== Personnel ==
- Randy Brecker – trumpet, flugelhorn
- Michael Brecker – tenor saxophone
- David Sanborn – alto saxophone
- Don Grolnick – keyboards
- Bob Mann – guitar
- Will Lee – bass
- Harvey Mason – drums
- Ralph MacDonald – percussion
- Doug Riley – keyboards
- Steve Khan – guitar
- Hiram Bullock – guitar
- Steve Gadd – drums
- Chris Parker – drums
- Barry Finnerty – guitar
- Neil Jason – bass, lead vocal
- Terry Bozzio – drums
- Sammy Figueroa – percussion
- Rafael Cruz – percussion
- Jeff Mironov – guitar
- David Spinozza – guitar
- Marcus Miller – bass
- George Duke – string synthesizer
- Mark Gray – electric piano
- Richie Morales – drums
- Manolo Badrena – percussion
- Paul Schaeffer – Fender Rhodes
- Allan Schwartzberg – drums
- Victoria – tambourine
- Kash Monet – handclaps, percussion, backing vocals
- Jeff Schoen – backing vocals
- Roy Herring – backing vocals
- Bob Clearmountain – handclaps
