= The Brecker Bros. Collection, Vol 2 =

1991 compilation album by Brecker Brothers

Compilation album by Brecker Brothers
- Released: October 1991
- Recorded: 1975–1981
- Genre: Jazz fusion, jazz funk
- Label: Novus
- Producer: Michael Cuscuna; The Brecker Brothers

Brecker Brothers chronology
The Brecker Bros. Collection, Vol 1 (1990)	The Brecker Bros. Collection, Vol 2 (1991)	Return of the Brecker Brothers (1992)

Randy Brecker chronology
Toe to Toe (1990)	The Brecker Bros. Collection, Vol 2 (1991)	Return of the Brecker Brothers (1992)

Michael Brecker chronology
Now You See It… (Now You Don't) (1990)	The Brecker Bros. Collection, Vol 2 (1991)	Return of the Brecker Brothers (1992)

Professional ratings
Review scores
Source	Rating
Allmusic	4.5/5 stars
The Penguin Guide to Jazz	2/4 stars

The Brecker Bros. Collection, Vol 2 is a compilation album by the American jazz fusion group, the Brecker Brothers. It was released by Novus Records in 1991. This compilation followed the release of The Brecker Bros. Collection, Vol 1, in 1990.

== Reception ==
AllMusic awarded the album with 4.5 out of 5 stars. The Penguin Guide review says: "Aside from their individual exploits, the two Brecker Brothers made some commercially successful records as co-leaders in the mid-1970s, and these two best-ofs give a clear picture of what they did: jazz-funk rhythms streamlined with guitars and keyboards, sometimes as settings for grandstand solos by either of the two principles but equally often as grooving ensemble pieces".

== Track listing ==
1. "Rocks" (Randy Brecker) — 4:39
2. "A Creature of Many Faces" (Randy Brecker) — 7:42
3. "Funky Sea, Funky Dew (live version)" (Michael Brecker) — 8:00
4. "Skunk Funk (live version)" (Randy Brecker) — 6:55
5. "Sponge (live version)" (Randy Brecker) — 6:19
6. "Squids (live version)" (Randy Brecker) — 7:54
7. "Tee’d Off" (Michael Brecker) — 3:43
8. "Squish" (Randy Brecker) — 5:50
9. "Baffled" (Randy Brecker) — 5:20
10. "Not Ethiopia" (Michael Brecker) — 5:41
11. "Jacknife" (Randy Brecker) — 6:18

== Personnel ==
- Randy Brecker – trumpet, flugelhorn
- Michael Brecker – tenor saxophone
- David Sanborn – alto saxophone
- Don Grolnick – keyboards
- Bob Mann – guitar
- Will Lee – bass
- Harvey Mason – drums
- Ralph MacDonald – percussion
- Barry Finnerty – guitar
- Neil Jason – bass, lead vocal
- Terry Bozzio – drums
- Sammy Figueroa – percussion
- Rafael Cruz – percussion
- Mark Gray – electric piano
- George Duke – string synthesizer
- Hiram Bullock – guitar
- Steve Jordan – drums
- Airto Moreira – percussion
- Marcus Miller – bass
- Richie Morales – drums
- Don Alias – percussion
