= Brigitte Zarie =

American singer

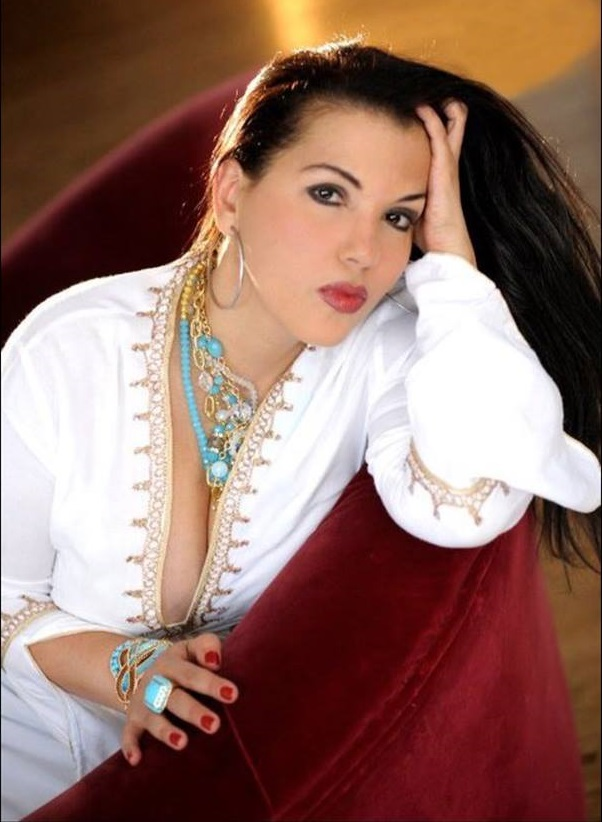
- Zarie in 2012

Background information
- Born: Toronto, Ontario, Canada
- Genre: Jazz
- Occupations: Singer; songwriter; composer
- Instrument: Vocals
- Label: NJMusic
- Website: brigittezarie.com

Brigitte Zarie is a Canadian-born American singer, songwriter and composer.

== Early years ==
Brigitte Zarie was born in Toronto, Ontario, Canada, of Moroccan Jewish parents originally from Casablanca, Morocco. Her mother was a singer and her father a soldier in the French Foreign Legion and a multi-instrumentalist. She grew up listening to Stan Getz and Frank Sinatra, and learned to play and sing with her ten siblings. She heard Bebop music for the first time when the family traveled to Buffalo, New York, U.S. and soon found her calling in music. She briefly attended The Royal Conservatory of Music in Toronto, but dropped out. Around 1995, she loaded her belongings into a U-Haul and moved to New York City, New York.

== Music career ==
Zarie sings in English, French and Portuguese. In 2009, she released her first solo album, Make Room for Me, arranged and co-written by Neil Jason. Jazz Inside magazine called her "The next jazz sensation from Canada." Reviewing her second album L'amour in 2014, critic Christopher Zoukis of the Seattle Post-Intelligencer compared her to Nina Simone. The album debuted at No. 1 on the French Amazon Jazz and French iTunes Jazz charts.

== Personal life ==
In 1998, she married the renowned session bass player Neil Jason.

== Discography ==
- Make Room for Me (NJ Music, 2011)
- L'amour (NJ Music, 2013)
- Marie (2021)
- La Boheme
