= Cityscape (Claus Ogerman and Michael Brecker album) =

Studio album by Claus Ogerman and Michael Brecker
- Released: July 14, 1982
- Recorded: January 4–8, 1982
- Studio: Power Station, New York City; Mediasound, New York City
- Genre: Jazz, classical
- Length: 46:56
- Label: Warner Bros. Records
- Producer: Tommy LiPuma

Claus Ogerman chronology
Aranjuez (1978)	Cityscape (1982)	Preludio and Chant (1982)

Michael Brecker chronology
Straphangin' (1981)	Cityscape (1982)	Michael Brecker (1987)

Professional ratings
Review scores
Source	Rating
Allmusic	4/5 stars
The Penguin Guide to Jazz Recordings	3/4 stars

Cityscape is an album by the composer, arranger and conductor Claus Ogerman and the saxophonist Michael Brecker. It was released in 1982 by Warner Bros. Records. It was produced by Tommy LiPuma.

== Reception ==
AllMusic awarded the album 4 stars and its review by James Manheim stated that it was one of Ogerman's "most successful works, not least because the overlap between the extended harmonies of jazz and the chromaticism of the late Romantic harmonic idiom in which Ogerman was trained is large enough to allow Brecker to operate comfortably – his improvisations seem to grow naturally out of the background, and the intersections between jazz band and orchestral strings come more easily here than on almost any other crossover between jazz and classical music".

The composition "In the Presence and Absence of Each Other (Parts 1, 2 and 3)" was nominated for a Grammy Award for Best Instrumental Composition at the 1982 Grammy Awards.

== Artwork ==
The album cover features a lithograph by the Ukrainian-born artist Louis Lozowick, called New York (1923).

== Track listing ==
All compositions by Claus Ogerman.

1. "Cityscape" – 8:46
2. "Habanera" – 8:06
3. "Nightwings" – 7:44
4. "In the Presence and Absence of Each Other (Part 1)" – 8:56
5. "In the Presence and Absence of Each Other (Part 2)" – 6:48
6. "In the Presence and Absence of Each Other (Part 3)" – 6:35

== Personnel ==
- Claus Ogerman – arranger, conductor
- Michael Brecker – tenor saxophone
- Warren Bernhardt – keyboards
- Steve Gadd – drums
- Eddie Gomez – bass (on "Nightwings" and "Cityscape")
- Marcus Miller – bass (on "In the Presence and Absence of Each Other (Part 1, 2 and 3)" and "Habanera")
- John Tropea – guitar (on "Habanera")
- Buzz Feiten – guitar (on "In the Presence and Absence of Each Other (Part 1)")
- Paulinho da Costa – percussion (on "In the Presence and Absence of Each Other (Part 1)" and "Habanera")
