= Heavy Metal Be-Bop =

Live album with a studio track by Brecker Brothers
- Released: September 1978
- Venue: My Father's Place, Roslyn, New York
- Genre: Jazz fusion, jazz funk
- Label: Arista, BMG
- Producer: Randy Brecker, Michael Brecker, Neil Jason, Kash Monet

Brecker Brothers chronology
Don't Stop the Music (1977)	Heavy Metal Be-Bop (1978)	Detente (1980)

Professional ratings
Review scores
Source	Rating
Allmusic	3/5 stars
The Rolling Stone Jazz Record Guide	4/5 stars
DownBeat	4/5 stars

Heavy Metal Be-Bop is a live album by the American jazz fusion group, the Brecker Brothers that was released by Arista Records in 1978. The album also includes the studio track "East River", which reached No. 34 in the UK singles chart in November 1978.

== Reception ==
AllMusic awarded the album with 3 stars and its review by Paul Kohler states: "Recorded live in New York, this explosive set of jazz, funk, and rock material was without question ahead of its time. Michael and Randy's use of electronically altered saxophone and trumpet sounds is amazing".

DownBeat awarded 4 stars to the album. Reviewer Lars Gabel wrote, "No doubt about it, this album is a gas—as intended, one presumes, by the Breckers — but it comes on so strong and so relentlessly hard blowing that it almost pushes the unprepared listener out of his chair". Gabel said the Brecker Brothers "have taken a direction opposite the one expected of musicians whose careers are rooted in studio and session work: on other people’s dates they deliver jazz as hardcore and serious as anyone’s; with their own band they engage in jazz-funk. One is hard put finding a better argument for genre democracy than the Brecker Brothers".

== Track listing ==
All compositions by Randy Brecker except where noted.

1. "East River" (Neil Jason, Bret Mazur, Kash Monet) — 3:35 – studio recording
2. "Inside Out" — 9:31
3. "Some Skunk Funk" — 6:59
4. "Sponge" — 6:23
5. "Funky Sea, Funky Dew" (Michael Brecker) — 8:02
6. "Squids" — 7:56

== Charts ==
Year	Single	Chart positions
Year	Single	UK Singles Chart
1978	"East River"	34

== Personnel ==
- Randy Brecker – Trumpet and Keyboards
- Michael Brecker – Tenor Saxophone
- Barry Finnerty – guitars, guitorganiser, background vocals
- Terry Bozzio – drums, background vocals
- Neil Jason – bass, lead vocals
- Sammy Figueroa – percussion
- Rafael Cruz – percussion
- Additional musicians on "East River"
  - Kash Monet – handclaps, percussion, backing vocals
  - Paul Shaffer – Fender Rhodes
  - Victoria – tambourine
  - Jeff Schoen – backing vocals
  - Roy Herring – backing vocals
  - Allan Schwartzberg – drums
  - Bob Clearmountain – handclaps

NOTE: On this specific recording Randy and Michael run their instruments through guitar amplifiers and play with various effects.
