= Detente (album) =

Studio album by Brecker Brothers
- Released: May 1980
- Studio: Electric Lady, Power Station and Pennylane, New York City, New York; Westlake, Los Angeles, California
- Genre: Jazz fusion, jazz funk
- Label: Arista
- Producer: George Duke

Brecker Brothers chronology
Heavy Metal Be-Bop (1978)	Detente (1980)	Straphangin' (1981)

Professional ratings
Review scores
Source	Rating
AllMusic	3/5 stars
The Rolling Stone Jazz Record Guide	2/5 stars

Detente is an album by the American jazz fusion group the Brecker Brothers. It was released by Arista Records in 1980.

== Reception ==
AllMusic awarded the album with 3 stars and its review by Jason Elias states: "Dream Theme", arranged by Michael Brecker, is the album's best song, reflective yet not melancholy, with his saxophone felt and flawless throughout. The last track, "I Don't Know Either", has solos from both of the Brecker Brothers, and displays the level of skill that many jazz outfits simply didn't possess".

== Track listing ==
1. "You Ga (Ta Give It)" (Randy Brecker) - 4:30
2. "Not Tonight" (Michael Brecker, Neil Jason) - 3:56
3. "Don’t Get Funny With My Money" (Randy Brecker) - 4:34
4. "Tee’d Off" (Michael Brecker) - 3:44
5. "You Left Something Behind" (Randy Brecker, Debra Barsha) - 4:05
6. "Squish" (Randy Brecker) - 5:51
7. "Dream Theme" (Michael Brecker) - 5:39
8. "Baffled" (Randy Brecker) - 5:22
9. "I Don’t Know Either" (Michael Brecker) - 5:46

== Personnel ==
The Brecker Brothers

- Michael Brecker – tenor saxophone, handclaps (1, 3), arrangements (1–5, 7, 9), flute (2, 5)
- Randy Brecker – trumpet, lead vocals (1, 3), handclaps (1, 3), arrangements (1, 3, 5–8), flugelhorn (2, 5, 8, 9), Prophet-5 (3)

Other musicians

- Don Grolnick – Yamaha CP-70 electric grand piano (1, 2), Rhodes piano (7)
- George Duke – lead vocals (1), clavinet (2), backing vocals (2), Yamaha CP-70 electric grand piano (3), Prophet-5 (4, 7, 8, 9), Oberheim Four Voice (6)
- Mark Gray – Rhodes piano (4, 5, 6, 8, 9)
- Jeff Mironov – guitars (1, 2, 3, 7)
- David Spinozza – guitars (1, 2, 3, 7)
- Hiram Bullock – guitars (4, 5, 6, 8, 9)
- Marcus Miller – bass (1, 3, 7)
- Neil Jason – bass (2, 4, 5, 6, 8, 9)
- Steve Gadd – drums (1, 2, 3, 7)
- Steve Jordan – drums (4, 5, 6, 8, 9)
- Paulinho da Costa – percussion (1, 3)
- Ralph MacDonald – percussion (2, 5, 7)
- Airto Moreira – percussion (6, 8, 9)
- Carl Carwell – handclaps (1), lead vocals (1, 2), backing vocals (2)
- Sue Ann Carwell – handclaps (1), backing vocals (2)
- Erik Zobler – handclaps (1)
- Bill Reichenbach Jr. – handclaps (3)
- D.J. Rogers – lead vocals (1), vocal ad-libs (1)
- Irene Cara – backing vocals (1, 3, 5)
- Ullanda McCullough – backing vocals (1, 3, 5)
- Paulette McWilliams – backing vocals (1, 3, 5)
- Fonzi Thornton – backing vocals (1, 3, 5)
- Luther Vandross – backing vocals (1, 3, 5), group vocal arrangements (3)

Production

- George Duke – producer
- Tommy Vicari – engineer, remixing
- Jay Burnett – assistant engineer
- James Farber – assistant engineer
- Garry Rindfuss – assistant engineer
- John Terelle – assistant engineer
- Raymond Willard – assistant engineer
- Erik Zobler – assistant engineer
- Brian Gardner – mastering at Allen Zentz Mastering (San Clemente, CA)
- Donn Davenport – art direction
- Phenographix Inc. – design
- John Pinderhughes – photography
