= Return of the Brecker Brothers =

Studio album by Brecker Brothers
- Released: September 1992
- Studio: Right Track Recording; New York
- Genre: Jazz fusion, jazz funk
- Length: 63:03
- Label: GRP
- Producer: Brecker Brothers

Brecker Brothers chronology
The Brecker Bros. Collection, Vol 2 (1991)	Return of the Brecker Brothers (1992)	Out of the Loop (1994)

Professional ratings
Review scores
Source	Rating
Allmusic	3.5/5 stars

Return of the Brecker Brothers is the sixth album by the American jazz fusion group, the Brecker Brothers. It was released by GRP Records in 1992, their first recording after a decade-long hiatus. The track "Big Idea" was released as an R&B single.

== Reception ==
AllMusic awarded the album with 3.5 stars and its review by Thom Jurek states: "This set marked a fitting return for the Breckers, who never let the fashionable tenets of the smooth jazz '90s totally appropriate their creativity or their sound". At the 1993 Grammy Awards the album received three nominations: Best Contemporary Jazz Album, Best R&B Instrumental Performance ("Big Idea") and Best Jazz Instrumental Solo (Randy Brecker on "Above & Below").

== Track listing ==
1. "Song for Barry" (Michael Brecker) — 5:07
2. "King of the Lobby" (Michael Brecker) — 5:20
3. "Big Idea" (Michael Brecker, Randy Brecker, Robbie Kilgore) — 4:20
4. "Above & Below" (Randy Brecker) — 7:05
5. "That’s All There Is to It" (Randy Brecker) — 5:26
6. "Wakaria (What’s Up?)" (Michael Brecker) — 5:26
7. "On the Backside" (Michael Brecker, Randy Brecker) — 6:25
8. "Sozinho (Alone)" (Randy Brecker) — 7:36
9. "Spherical" (Michael Brecker) — 5:58
10. "Good Gracious" (Randy Brecker) — 5:13
11. "Roppongi" (Randy Brecker) — 4:56

== Personnel ==
The Brecker Brothers

- Michael Brecker – tenor saxophone, Akai EWI (1, 6, 11), keyboards (1, 2, 9), synthesizer programming (1, 2, 6, 9), arrangements (1, 2, 5, 7, 9), soprano saxophone (6)
- Randy Brecker – trumpet (1–7, 9, 10, 11), flugelhorn (1, 2, 6, 8), arrangements (4, 5, 7, 8, 10, 11), vocals (5)

Other Musicians

- Max Risenhoover – synthesizer programming (1, 2), percussion programming (1), bass (2), drums (2), arrangements (2), snare drum programming (6), ride cymbal (6), cymbals (8)
- George Whitty – keyboards (1, 2, 4, 5, 6, 8–11), additional Rhodes piano (3), arrangements (5, 9), acoustic piano (7), programming (7), additional arrangements (7), synthesizer programming (9, 11)
- Mary "Maz" Kessler – keyboards (3, 7), drum programming (3, 7), arrangements (3)
- Robbie Kilgore – Rhodes piano (3), bass (3), arrangements (3), additional acoustic piano (7), synth bass (7)
- Mike Stern – guitars (1, 2, 4, 8–11)
- Dean Brown – guitars (2, 5, 11)
- Armand Sabal-Lecco – bass (1, 5, 6), piccolo bass (1, 6), vocals (1, 6), drums (6), percussion (6), arrangements (6)
- James Genus – bass (4, 10, 11), acoustic bass (7, 8), electric bass (8)
- Dennis Chambers – drums (4, 5, 6, 8–11)
- Don Alias – percussion (1, 8, 9, 11)
- Bashiri Johnson – percussion (4)
- David Sanborn – alto saxophone (2)
- Jason Miles – arrangements (2)
- Veera – voices (2, 3)
- Will Lee – additional voices (5), bass (9)
- Malcolm Pollack – additional voices (5)

== Production ==
- Dave Grusin – executive producer
- Larry Rosen – executive producer
- The Brecker Brothers – producers (1, 2, 4–11)
- Maz & Kilgore – producers (3, 7), mixing (7)
- Max Risenhoover – co-producer, editing, sequencing
- George Whitty – co-producer
- Todd Childress – engineer, assistant engineer
- Malcolm Pollack – engineer
- Garry Rindfuss – engineer
- Michael White – engineer, assistant engineer
- Jenny Bette – assistant engineer
- Brian Kinkead – assistant engineer
- Lolly Grodner – assistant engineer
- Ray Bardani – mixing (1, 2, 3)
- Joe Ferla – mixing (4, 5, 6, 8–11)
- Joseph Doughney – post-production engineer
- Michael Landy – post-production engineer
- Adam Zelinda – post-production engineer
- Greg Calbi – mastering at Sterling Sound (New York, NY)
- Kyle Benson – A&R
- Cameron Mizell – production coordinator
- Hollis King – art direction
- Scott Johnson – design
- Sonny Mediana – design
- Andy Ruggirello – design
- Dan Serrano – design
- Sharon Franklin – design assistant
- Darryl Pitt – cover concept, photography
- Judith Schiller – photography

== Return of the Brecker Brothers – Live in Barcelona (VHS) ==
Return of the Brecker Brothers - Live in Barcelona (VHS).

In 1992, a VHS video entitled "Return of the Brecker Brothers – Live in Barcelona" was released by GRP Records of a concert at the Palau de la Música Catalana in Barcelona. The concert has not officially been released on DVD format. It was officially released on Laser disk however. (GRP Video – PILJ-1124)

=== Track listing ===
1. "Above & Below" (Randy Brecker)
2. "Spherical" (Michael Brecker)
3. "Some Skunk Funk" (Randy Brecker)
4. "Common Ground" (Mike Stern)
5. "Song for Barry" (Michael Brecker)
6. "Inside Out" (Randy Brecker)

=== Personnel ===
- Michael Brecker – tenor saxophone, EWI
- Randy Brecker – trumpet
- George Whitty – keyboards
- Mike Stern – guitars
- James Genus – bass
- Dennis Chambers – drums
