= Now You See It... (Now You Don't) =

Studio album by Michael Brecker
- Released: August 17, 1990
- Recorded: 1990
- Studio: The Power Station and Right Track Recording (New York, NY)
- Genre: Jazz
- Length: 51:51
- Label: GRP
- Producer: Don Grolnick

Michael Brecker chronology
The Brecker Bros. Collection, Vol 1 (1990)	Now You See It... (Now You Don't) (1990)	The Brecker Bros. Collection, Vol 2 (1991)

Now You See It... (Now You Don't) is an album by Michael Brecker. It was recorded in 1990 and released by GRP Records.

== Recording and music ==
The album was recorded in 1990. It was Brecker's third as leader. The personnel and composers varied from track to track.

== Release and reception ==
Professional ratings
Review scores
Source	Rating
AllMusic	4/5 stars
The Penguin Guide to Jazz	3/4 stars

Now You See It… (Now You Don't) was released by GRP Records. AllMusic awarded the album 4 stars and its review by Scott Yanow states: "Most of the originals (either by Brecker, Beard, or producer Don Grolnick) project moods rather than feature strong melodies, but Michael Brecker's often-raging tenor makes the most of each opportunity". John Kelman of All About Jazz regarded the album as compelling and well worth hearing.

== Track listing ==
1. "Escher Sketch (A Tale of Two Rhythms)" (Michael Brecker) – 5:23
2. "Minsk" (Don Grolnick) – 9:03
3. "Ode to The Doo Da Day" (Jim Beard) – 5:51
4. "Never Alone" (Brecker) – 5:35
5. "Peep" (Brecker) – 7:25
6. "Dogs In The Wine Shop" (Grolnick) – 6:33
7. "Quiet City" (Beard) – 6:04
8. "The Meaning of the Blues" (Bobby Troup, Leah Worth) – 5:57

== Personnel ==
- Michael Brecker – tenor saxophone, EWI (tracks 1–3, 5, 6), keyboards (track 1), drum programming (track 1)
- Jim Beard – synthesizers (tracks 1–4, 6), additional keyboards (track 5), keyboards (track 7)
- Jason Miles – synthesizer programming (track 1)
- Judd Miller – EWI programming (tracks 1, 2, 5, 6)
- Joey Calderazzo – acoustic piano (tracks 2, 5, 6, 8)
- Jon Herington – guitars (tracks 1–3, 5)
- Victor Bailey – bass (tracks 1–4, 6, 7), electric bass (track 5)
- Jay Anderson – acoustic bass (track 5), bass (track 8)
- Jimmy Bralower – drum programming (track 1)
- Adam Nussbaum – crash cymbal (track 1), drums (tracks 2, 5, 8)
- Omar Hakim – drums (track 4), percussion (track 7)
- Don Alias – percussion (tracks 1, 3, 4, 6, 7)
- Steve Berrios – percussion (track 6)
- Milton Cardona – percussion (track 6)

=== Technical personnel ===
- Don Grolnick – producer
- James Farber – recording and mixing
- Lolly Grodner – recording assistant
- Gary Solomon – recording assistant
- Mike White – recording assistant
- Joseph Doughney – post-production
- Michael Landy – post-production
- The Review Room (New York, NY) – post-production location
- Greg Calbi – mastering at Sterling Sound, New York City, USA
- Michelle Hirsch – production assistant
- Jerry Wortman – production coordinator
- Suzanne Sherman – production coordinator
- Andy Baltimore – creative director
- David Gibb – graphic design
- Jacki McCarthy – graphic design
- Andy Ruggirello – graphic design
- Dan Serrano – graphic design
- Darryl Pitt – back cover photography and management
- M.C. Escher – cover artwork

== Cover art work ==
The album cover makes a reference of a woodcut art piece developed by Maurits Cornelis Escher titled Sky and Water I.
