= Barry Finnerty =

American jazz musician (born 1951)

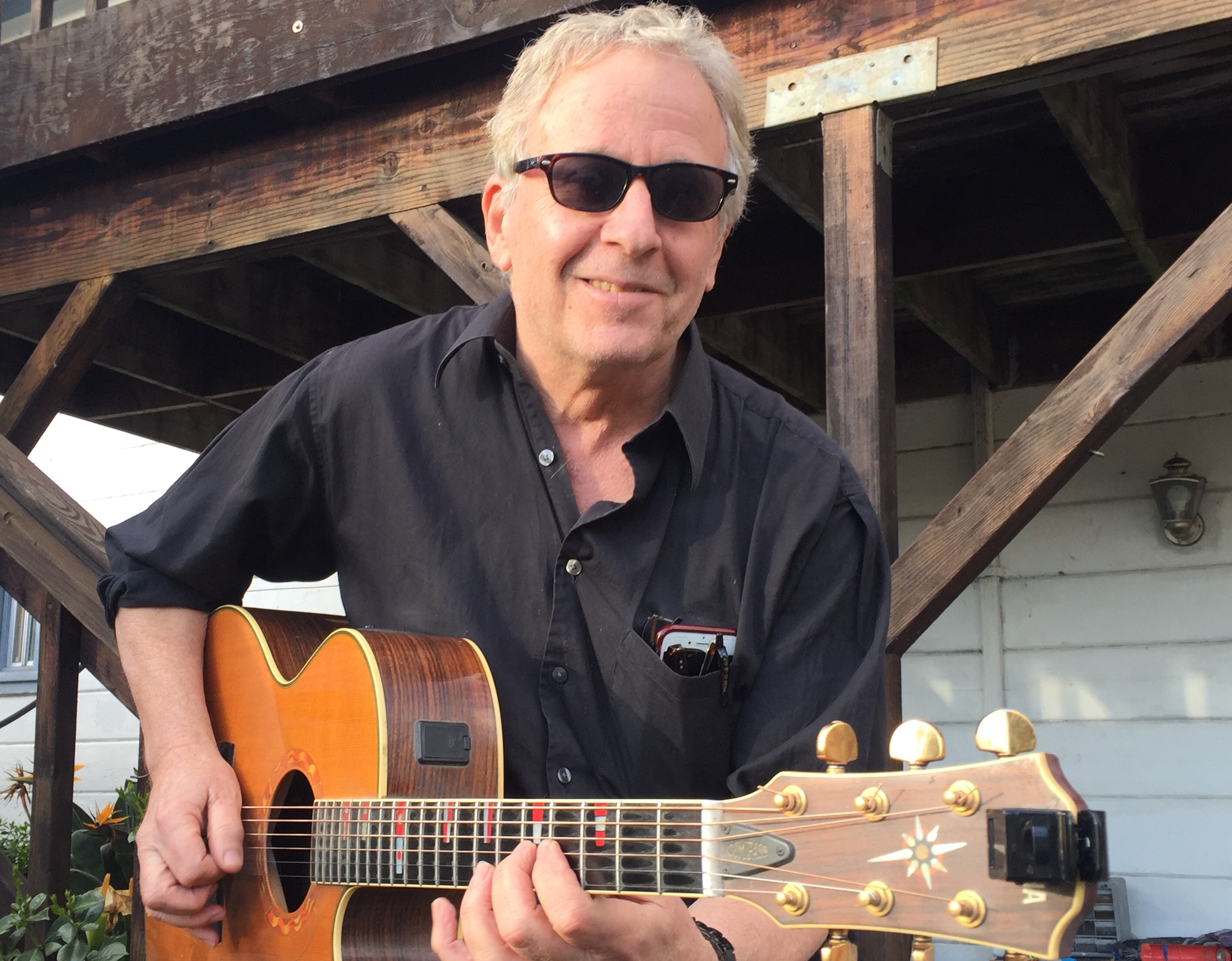

Background information
- Born: Michael Barry Finnerty; December 3, 1951 (age 74); San Francisco, California, U.S.
- Genres: Jazz
- Occupations: Musician, singer-songwriter
- Instrument: Guitar
- Website: www.barryfinnerty.com

Michael Barry Finnerty (born December 3, 1951) is an American jazz guitarist, keyboardist, singer, songwriter, and arranger, known for his work as a touring and recording session musician for Miles Davis, The Crusaders, the Brecker Brothers, Hubert Laws, and Ray Barretto. Finnerty is the author of books on music improvisation and a semi-autobiographical novel.

== Music career ==
Finnerty was born in San Francisco and raised on the West Coast, studying at the San Francisco Conservatory of Music and University of California Berkeley.

He lived in Hong Kong with his mother in the early 1960s. When he was fourteen, he began playing electric guitar and joined a band that opened a show for Herman's Hermits. On returning to San Francisco, he became friends with guitarist Jim Checkley, who invited him to join Beefy Red in 1969. He played in that band for several years.

He moved to New York City after attending Berklee College of Music for a short time in 1971. In 1974 he began playing with Chico Hamilton, Airto Moreira, and Flora Purim. In 1975 he became a member of the Joe Farrell quartet, and later in the decade played with Hubert Laws, Tower of Power, Thad Jones and Mel Lewis, and Ray Barretto.

Finnerty played and recorded with Michael Brecker and Randy Brecker (1977–81) and The Crusaders (1979–84), in addition to touring in Europe with Billy Cobham in 1980. He played and recorded with Miles Davis in 1981, being featured on much of Davis's 1981 album The Man with the Horn and is mentioned in Davis's autobiography.

Finnerty has worked both as a session musician and as leader of his own bands.

== As author ==
He released his first jazz education book, The Serious Jazz Practice Book, in 2006. The work was endorsed by notable musicians including Randy Brecker, Bob Sheppard and Dave Liebman. Finnerty authored a follow-up work in 2008, The Serious Jazz Book II, endorsed by jazz flautist Hubert Laws. In 2016 Finnerty released a novel loosely based on his life in New York City in the mid-90s.

== Personal ==
Finnerty is the son of actor Warren Finnerty (1925–1974) who appeared in numerous films including Cool Hand Luke (1967) and Easy Rider (1969). He is married to artist and songwriter Clarita Zarate.

== Discography ==
- New York City (Victor, 1982)
- Lights On Broadway (Morning, 1985)
- 2B Named Later (Cheetah, 1988)
- Straight Ahead (Arabesque, 1995)
- Space Age Blues (Hot Wire, 1998)
- Manhattan Sessions Part 1 (ESC, 2009)
- Blues for Trane (Finn, 2010)
- Nothing's Gonna Be All Right (Birdland, 2015)

=== As sideman ===
With Ray Barretto

- Tomorrow: Barretto Live (Atlantic, 1976)
- Eye of the Beholder (Atlantic, 1977)
- Gracias (Fania, 1978)

With The Crusaders

- Street Life (MCA, 1979)
- Standing Tall (MCA, 1981)
- Royal Jam (MCA, 1982)
- Live in Japan (GRP, 1993)

With Jun Fukamachi

- The Sea of Dirac (Kitty, 1977)
- Evening Star (Kitty, 1978)
- On the Move (Alfa, 1978)

With others

- Brecker Brothers, Heavy Metal Be-Bop (Arista, 1978)
- Brecker Brothers, Straphangin' (Arista, 1981)
- Randy Brecker & Eliane Elias, Amanda (Passport, 1985)
- Coati Mundi, The Former 12 Year Old Genius (Virgin, 1983)
- Billy Cobham, Live: Flight Time (Sandra, 1981)
- Jorge Dalto, Rendez-Vous (Eastworld, 1983)
- Miles Davis, The Man with the Horn (Columbia, 1981)
- Eliane Elias, Cross Currents (Denon, 1988)
- Jose Fajardo, El Talento Total (Zeida 1977)
- Hiroshi Fukumura, Hot Shot (Morning 1985)
- Wilton Felder, Gentle Fire (MCA, 1983)
- Roy Gaines, Gainelining (Red Lightnin' 1981)
- Roy Gaines, Roy Gaines with Crusaders Crew (P-Vine 1982)
- Steve Grossman, Perspective (Atlantic, 1979)
- Chico Hamilton, Peregrinations (Blue Note, 1975)
- Tom Harrell, Aurora (Adamo, 1976)
- Roy Haynes, The Island (Explore 2007)
- Terumasa Hino, Double Rainbow (CBS/Sony 1981)
- Stix Hooper, The World Within (MCA, 1979)
- Thad Jones & Mel Lewis, New Life (A&M, 1976)
- Patrick Juvet, Lady Night (Casablanca, 1979)
- Masabumi Kikuchi, Susto (CBS/Sony 1981)
- Hubert Laws, Romeo & Juliet (Columbia, 1976)
- Hubert Laws, Say It with Silence (CBS, 1978)
- Didier Lockwood, The Kid (MPS, 1983)
- Teruo Nakamura, Big Apple (Agharta, 1979)
- Teruo Nakamura, Super Friends (Eastworld, 1985)
- Opa, Magic Time (Milestone, 1977)
- Noel Pointer, Feel It (Soul Music.com, 1979)
- Joe Sample, Rainbow Seeker (ABC, 1978)
- Joe Sample, Oasis (MCA, 1985)
- John Serry Jr., Exhibition (Chrysalis, 1979)
- Steve Smith, Fiafiaga (Columbia, 1988)
- SOS All-Stars, New York Rendezvous (Chase 1987)
- John Stubblefield, Sophisticated Funk (Cheetah, 1990)
- Syreeta, Set My Love in Motion (Tamla, 1981)
- Taj Mahal, Evolution (Warner Bros., 1978)
- Vital Information, Global Beat (Columbia, 1986)
