= Don't Stop the Music (Brecker Brothers album) =

Don’t Stop the Music

Studio album by Brecker Brothers
- Released: June 1977
- Recorded: 1977
- Studio: Atlantic, New York City, New York
- Genre: Jazz fusion, jazz funk
- Label: Arista
- Producer: Jack Richardson

Brecker Brothers chronology
Back to Back (1976)	Don’t Stop the Music (1977)	Heavy Metal Be-Bop (1978)

Professional ratings
Review scores
Source	Rating
Allmusic	3/5 stars

Don't Stop the Music is the third album by the American jazz fusion group, the Brecker Brothers. It was released by Arista Records in 1977.

== Reception ==
AllMusic awarded the album with 3 stars and its review by Jason Elias states: "The funky and quirky "Squids" features Randy Brecker's customarily offbeat and singular electric trumpet work. Hiram Bullock's articulate guitar also shines on that track and he fit into the Breckers sound like no other player. "Funky Sea, Funky Dew" is a reflective, urbane mid-tempo offering that has great tenor solos from Michael Brecker". At the 1978 Grammy Awards the album received a nomination for Best R&B Instrumental Performance ("Funky Sea, Funky Dew").

== Track listing ==
1. "Finger Lickin' Good" (Randy Brecker, Ticky Brecker) - 3:58
2. "Funky Sea, Funky Dew" (Michael Brecker) - 6:13
3. "As Long as I’ve Got Your Love" (Doug Billard, Beverly Billard) - 4:14
4. "Squids" (Randy Brecker) - 7:42
5. "Don’t Stop the Music" (Jerry Friedman) - 6:30
6. "Petals" (Randy Brecker) - 4:20
7. "Tabula Rasa" (Randy Brecker) - 8:19

== Personnel ==
The Brecker Brothers

- Michael Brecker – tenor saxophone, flute
- Randy Brecker – trumpet, flugelhorn, electric trumpet

Other Musicians

- Don Grolnick – keyboards
- Doug Riley – keyboards
- Steve Khan – electric guitar, 12-string electric guitar
- Jerry Friedman – guitars (1), electric piano (5)
- Sandy Torano – guitars (1, 3)
- Hiram Bullock – guitars (2, 3, 4, 6)
- Will Lee – bass, backing vocals
- Chris Parker – drums (1, 2, 3, 5)
- Steve Gadd – drums (4, 6)
- Lenny White – drums (7)
- Ralph MacDonald – percussion
- Sammy Figueroa – congas (7)
- Josh Brown – backing vocals
- Robin Clark – backing vocals
- Chrissy Faith – backing vocals
- Doug and Beverly Billard – backing vocals (3)

Horn Section

- Doug Riley – arrangements
- Lou Marini – alto saxophone
- Lew Del Gatto – baritone saxophone
- Michael Brecker – tenor saxophone
- Dave Taylor – bass trombone
- Barry Rogers – trombone
- Randy Brecker – trumpet
- Alan Rubin – trumpet

String Section

- Doug Riley – arrangements
- Gene Orloff – concertmaster
- Jesse Levy and Richard Locker – cello
- Lamar Alsop, Alfred Brown and Richard Maximoff – viola
- Sanford Allen, Ariana Bronne, Peter Dimitriades, Paul Gershman, Harold Kohon, Harry Lookofsky, Guy Lumia, Matthew Raimondi and Aaron Rosand – violin

=== Production ===
- Steve Backer – executive producer
- Jack Richardson – producer
- Gene Paul – engineer
- Tom Heid – technical recording
- Craig "Cub" Richardson – mastering at J. A. M. F. (Toronto, Ontario, Canada)
- Bob Heimall – art direction, design
- David Arky and John E. Barrett – photography
