= Michael Brecker (album) =

Studio album by Michael Brecker
- Released: 1987
- Studio: The Power Station, RPM Studios and Skyline Studios (New York, NY)
- Genre: Jazz
- Length: 46:01
- Label: Impulse!
- Producer: Michael Brecker: Don Grolnick

Michael Brecker chronology
Cityscape (1982)	Michael Brecker (1987)	Don't Try This at Home (1988)

Professional ratings
Review scores
Source	Rating
Allmusic	5/5 stars
The Penguin Guide to Jazz	3/4 stars

Michael Brecker is the debut album by American saxophonist Michael Brecker. It was released on the Impulse! record label in 1987. It features guitarist Pat Metheny, pianist Kenny Kirkland, bassist Charlie Haden and drummer Jack DeJohnette.

== Review ==
The Allmusic review by Scott Yanow awards the album a full 5 stars and states "Although he had been a major tenor saxophonist in the studios for nearly 20 years and was quite popular for his work with the Brecker Brothers, this MCA/Impulse set was Michael Brecker's first as a leader." The album was issued in two versions: LP record and CD. The CD version has a bonus track, "My One and Only Love".

== Track listing ==
Side one:
No.	Title	Writer(s)	Length
1.	"Sea Glass"	Michael Brecker	5:49
2.	"Syzygy"	Brecker	9:44
3.	"Choices"	Mike Stern	8:06

Side two:
No.	Title	Writer(s)	Length
1.	"Nothing Personal"	Don Grolnick	5:29
2.	"The Cost of Living"	Grolnick	7:49
3.	"Original Rays"	Brecker, Grolnick, Stern	9:04
4.	"My One and Only Love"	Robert Mellin, Guy Wood	8:16

== Personnel ==
- Michael Brecker – tenor saxophone, EWI
- Kenny Kirkland – keyboards
- Robbie Kilgore – synthesizer programming
- Pat Metheny – guitars
- Charlie Haden – bass
- Jack DeJohnette – drums

=== Technical personnel ===
- Michael Brecker – producer
- Don Grolnick – producer
- Ricky Schultz – executive producer
- James Farber – recording and mixing
- Knut Bøhn – assistant engineer
- Steve Boyer – assistant engineer
- Bruce Buchalter – assistant engineer
- Mike Krowiak – assistant engineer
- Jeff Lippay – assistant engineer
- Don Rodenbach – assistant engineer
- Rhonda Schoen – digital editing
- Greg Calbi – mastering at Sterling Sound, New York City, USA
- Kathleen Covert – art direction and design
- Timothy White – photography
- Rick Laird – inner sleeve photography
