= Out of the Loop (Brecker Brothers album) =

Studio album by Brecker Brothers
- Released: September 1994
- Recorded: April–August 1992
- Genre: Jazz fusion
- Length: 54:33
- Label: GRP
- Producer: George Whitty, Maz Kessler, Robbie Kilgore

Brecker Brothers chronology
Return of the Brecker Brothers (1992)	Out of the Loop (1994)

Randy Brecker chronology
Return of the Brecker Brothers (1992)	Out of the Loop (1994)	Into the Sun (1996)

Michael Brecker chronology
Return of the Brecker Brothers (1992)	Out of the Loop (1994)	Tales from the Hudson (1996)

Professional ratings
Review scores
Source	Rating
Allmusic	4/5 stars

Out of the Loop is the seventh and final studio album by the Brecker Brothers that was released by GRP Records in 1994. In 1995 the album won the brothers two Grammy Awards for Best Contemporary Jazz Performance (now known as Best Contemporary Jazz Album) and Best Instrumental Composition (for Michael Brecker's "African Skies").

== Reception ==
At AllMusic, Jim Newsom gave the album four stars and wrote, "The album is surprisingly strong, and any fears of a paint-by-numbers attempt to cash in on past glories are quickly dispelled with the opening 'Slang', which is reminiscent of Amandla-era Miles. Here, as throughout the disc, Michael's sax solo burns with abandon, while brother Randy's trumpet glides across a tastefully smooth and melodic terrain".

== Track listing ==
No.	Title	Writer(s)	Length
1.	"Slang"	Michael Brecker	6:11
2.	"Evocations"	Chris Botti, Michael Brecker	5:16
3.	"Scrunch"	Randy Brecker, Michael Brecker, Maz Kessler, Robbie Kilgore	4:28
4.	"Secret Heart"	Randy Brecker, Eliane Elias	5:03
5.	"African Skies"	Michael Brecker	7:46
6.	"When It Was"	Brecker, Brecker, Kessler, Kilgore	4:29
7.	"Harpoon"	Randy Brecker	7:43
8.	"The Nightwalker"	Michael Brecker	8:44
9.	"And Then She Wept"	Randy Brecker	4:53

== Personnel ==
- Michael Brecker – tenor saxophone, arrangements (1, 5, 8), soprano saxophone (4, 5), Akai EWI (4, 5, 7, 8)
- Randy Brecker – trumpet (1, 2, 3, 5–8), flugelhorn (4, 9), arrangements (7)
- George Whitty – keyboards (1, 7, 8, 9), Hammond organ bass (1), arrangements (1, 5, 7, 8, 9), acoustic piano (2), keyboard programming (4)
- Chris Botti – keyboard programming (2), bass and drum programming (2), arrangements (2)
- Andy Snitzer – keyboard programming (2), bass and drum programming (2), arrangements (2)
- Maz Kessler – keyboards (3, 6), rhythm programming (3), arrangements (3, 6)
- Robbie Kilgore – keyboards (3, 6), rhythm programming (3), arrangements (3, 6), guitars (6)
- Eliane Elias – keyboards (4), vocals (4), arrangements (4)
- Dean Brown – guitars (1, 2, 3, 6–9), electric guitar (4, 5)
- Larry Saltzman – guitars (2)
- James Genus – bass (1, 4, 7, 8, 9), acoustic bass (3)
- Armand Sabal-Lecco – bass (5), acoustic piccolo bass (5), vocals (5)
- Steve Jordan – drums (1, 7, 8, 9)
- Shawn Pelton – drums (2)
- Rodney Holmes – drums (4, 5)
- Steve Thornton – percussion (1, 2, 4, 5, 7, 8, 9)
- Mark Ledford – additional backing vocals (4)

Production

- Dave Grusin – executive producer
- Larry Rosen – executive producer
- George Whitty – producer (1, 5, 7, 8, 9), additional recording
- Chris Botti – producer (2), additional recording
- Andy Snitzer – producer (2), additional recording
- Maz Kessler – producer (3, 6), mixing (3, 6), additional recording
- Robbie Kilgore – producer (3, 6), mixing (3, 6), additional recording
- Elaine Elias – producer (4), editing
- James Farber – recording, mixing (1, 2, 4, 5, 7, 8, 9)
- "Q" Engstrom – mixing (3, 6)
- Rich Lamb – additional recording
- Hiro Ishihara – assistant engineer
- Chris Albert – mix assistant (1, 2, 4, 5, 7, 8, 9)
- Scott Austin – mix assistant (1, 2, 4, 5, 7, 8, 9)
- Rory Romano – mix assistant (1, 2, 4, 5, 7, 8, 9)
- Robert Smith – mix assistant (3, 6)
- Ron Bach – editing engineer
- Joseph Doughney – post-production engineer
- Michael Landy – post-production engineer
- Scott Hull – mastering at Masterdisk (New York, NY)
- Cara Bridgins – production coordinator
- Joseph Moore – assistant production coordinator
- Sonny Mediana – production director, art direction
- Andy Baltimore – creative director
- Darryl Pitt – cover concept
- Laurie Goldman – graphic design
- Matt Zumbo – front cover illustration
- Kim Steele – back cover photography

== Awards ==
Grammy Awards

Year	Winner	Category
1995	Brecker Brothers	Best Contemporary Jazz Album
1995	Michael Brecker ("African Skies")	Best Instrumental Composition
