= Straphangin' =

Straphangin’

Studio album by Brecker Brothers
- Released: March 1981
- Recorded: Right Track, New York City
- Genre: Jazz fusion, jazz funk
- Label: Arista Records
- Producer: Michael Brecker; Randy Brecker

Brecker Brothers chronology
Detente (1980)	Straphangin’ (1981)	The Brecker Bros. Collection, Vol 1 (1990)

Professional ratings
Review scores
Source	Rating
AllMusic	3/5 stars
The Rolling Stone Jazz Record Guide	2/5 stars

Straphangin' is an album by the American jazz fusion group the Brecker Brothers. It was released by Arista Records in 1981.

== Reception ==
AllMusic awarded the album with 3 stars and its review by Rob Theakston states: "No doubt taking sonic cues from Spyro Gyra and Steely Dan, the guys open the album with the mellow title track and the equally suggestive "Threesome" before stepping things up with the highly percussive "Bathsheba".

== Track listing ==
1. "Straphangin'" (Michael Brecker) - 8:06
2. "Threesome" (Randy Brecker) - 6:24
3. "Bathsheba" (Michael Brecker) - 6:58
4. "Jacknife" (Randy Brecker) - 6:16
5. "Why Can’t I Be There" (Randy Brecker) - 5:00
6. "Not Ethiopia" (Michael Brecker) - 5:40
7. "Spreadeagle" (Randy Brecker) - 5:57

== Personnel ==
The Brecker Brothers

- Michael Brecker – tenor saxophone, arrangements (1, 3, 6), producer
- Randy Brecker – trumpet, flugelhorn, arrangements (2, 4, 5, 7), producer

Other Musicians and Production Credits

- Mark Gray – keyboards
- Barry Finnerty – guitars
- Marcus Miller – bass
- Richie Morales – drums
- Manolo Badrena – percussion (1, 3, 4, 5, 7)
- Sammy Figueroa – percussion (1, 3, 4, 5, 7)
- Don Alias – percussion (6)
- Frank Filipetti – recording, mixing, mastering
- Julian Shapiro – engineer
- Ted Jensen – mastering
- Sterling Sound (New York, NY) – mastering location
- Annie Pfeiffer – production coordinator
- Neal Pozner – art direction
- John Ford – photography
