= Neil Jason =

American musician, producer and composer

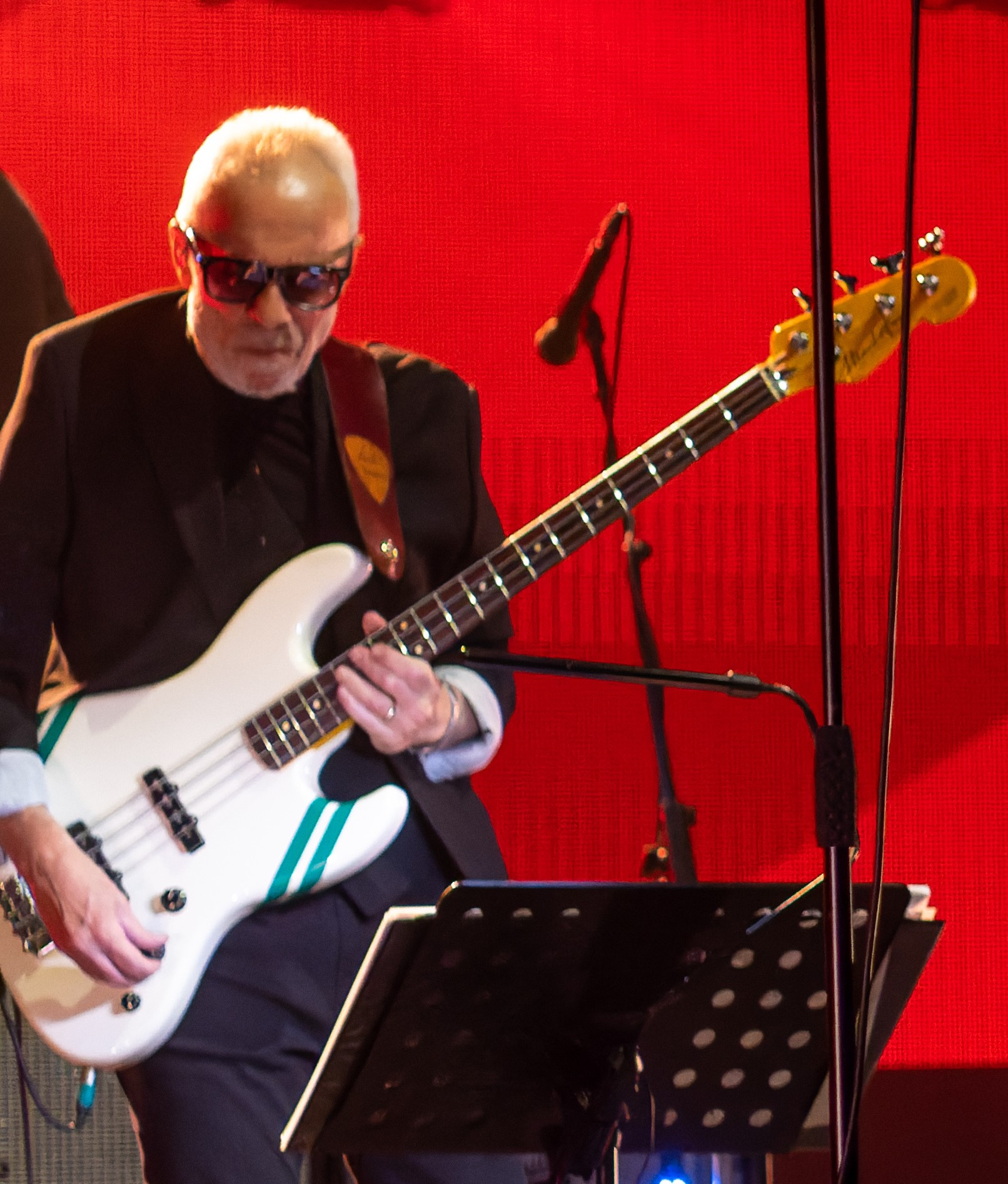
- Jason performing with Roxy Music in 2022.

Background information
- Born: January 2, 1954 (age 72); New York City, New York, U.S.
- Genres: Rock; pop; jazz; classical; funk
- Occupations: Musician; composer; music programmer
- Instruments: Bass guitar; trumpet; saxophone; trombone; piano; percussion; vocals
- Years active: 1976–present

Neil Jason is an American musician, songwriter, producer and composer. In a career spanning more than 40 years, he has worked with some of the biggest recording artists, including John Lennon, Billy Joel, Roxy Music, Mick Jagger, Pete Townshend, Paul McCartney, Paul Simon, Kiss, Gene Simmons, Michael Jackson, Brecker Brothers, Hall & Oates, Cyndi Lauper, Harry Chapin, Joe Jackson, Charlie Watts, Dire Straits, Bryan Ferry, Diana Ross, Grace Slick, John McLaughlin, Gladys Knight, Debbie Harry, Michael Franks, Bob James, David Sanborn, Brigitte Zarie, Carly Simon, Janis Ian, Nils Lofgren, Eddie Van Halen, Mike Oldfield and tenor Luciano Pavarotti. He also writes for TV and film.

Neil was a member of the Saturday Night Live house band from 1980 to 1983 and has made over a hundred appearances with Paul Shaffer’s band on The Late Show With David Letterman. He has also worked on countless hit commercials and movies as a composer in New York City.

== Early life ==
Jason was born and raised in New York City. He grew up in Brooklyn and began playing the trumpet in the sixth grade. He went on to play in all the school bands, not only the trumpet, but also saxophone and trombone. He started taking piano lessons to learn more about music. He did not play the bass guitar until he was in high school.

== Influence ==
Jason has identified his influences as a combination of his school training on trumpet, saxophone, and piano (giving his fingers strength and dexterity). Bands who influenced him included Chase, Dreams and Chicago, and the musicians who influenced him included James Jamerson, Bob Babbitt, Larry Graham and Sly Stone.

== Collaborations ==
=== Artists ===
- Harry Chapin
- Eumir Deodato
- Bryan Ferry at Wiener Stadthalle, Vienna (May 30, 2017)
- Michael Franks
- Debbie Harry
- Janis Ian
- Joe Jackson
- Michael Jackson
- Mick Jagger
- Bob James
- Billy Joel
- Eric Johnson at Iridium Jazz Club, NYC (June 2010)
- Gladys Knight
- Danny "Kootch" Kortchmar, Iridium Club NYC 2011
- Cyndi Lauper
- John Lennon
- Nils Lofgren
- Paul McCartney
- Grace Slick
- John McLaughlin
- Ted Nugent at Iridium Jazz Club, NYC (May 16, 2011)
- Luciano Pavarotti
- Diana Ross
- David Sanborn
- Paul Shaffer
- Carly Simon
- Paul Simon
- Peter Criss
- Gene Simmons
- Pete Townshend
- Eddie Van Halen
- Charlie Watts

=== Bands ===
- Brecker Brothers at Cotton Club, Tokyo
- CBS Orchestra previously known as "The World's Most Dangerous Band" (NBC)
- Dire Straits
- Hall & Oates
- Kiss
- Roxy Music
- Saturday Night Live Band

== Personal life ==
In 1998, he married Canadian-born American singer, songwriter and composer Brigitte Zarie.

== Interviews ==
- Interviewed in Denmark, Summer 2014 during Brecker Brothers Reunion tour.
- Interviewed at JazzAaar Festival, Aarau, Switzerland, May 1, 2016
