= Michael Brecker =

American jazz saxophonist and composer (1949–2007)

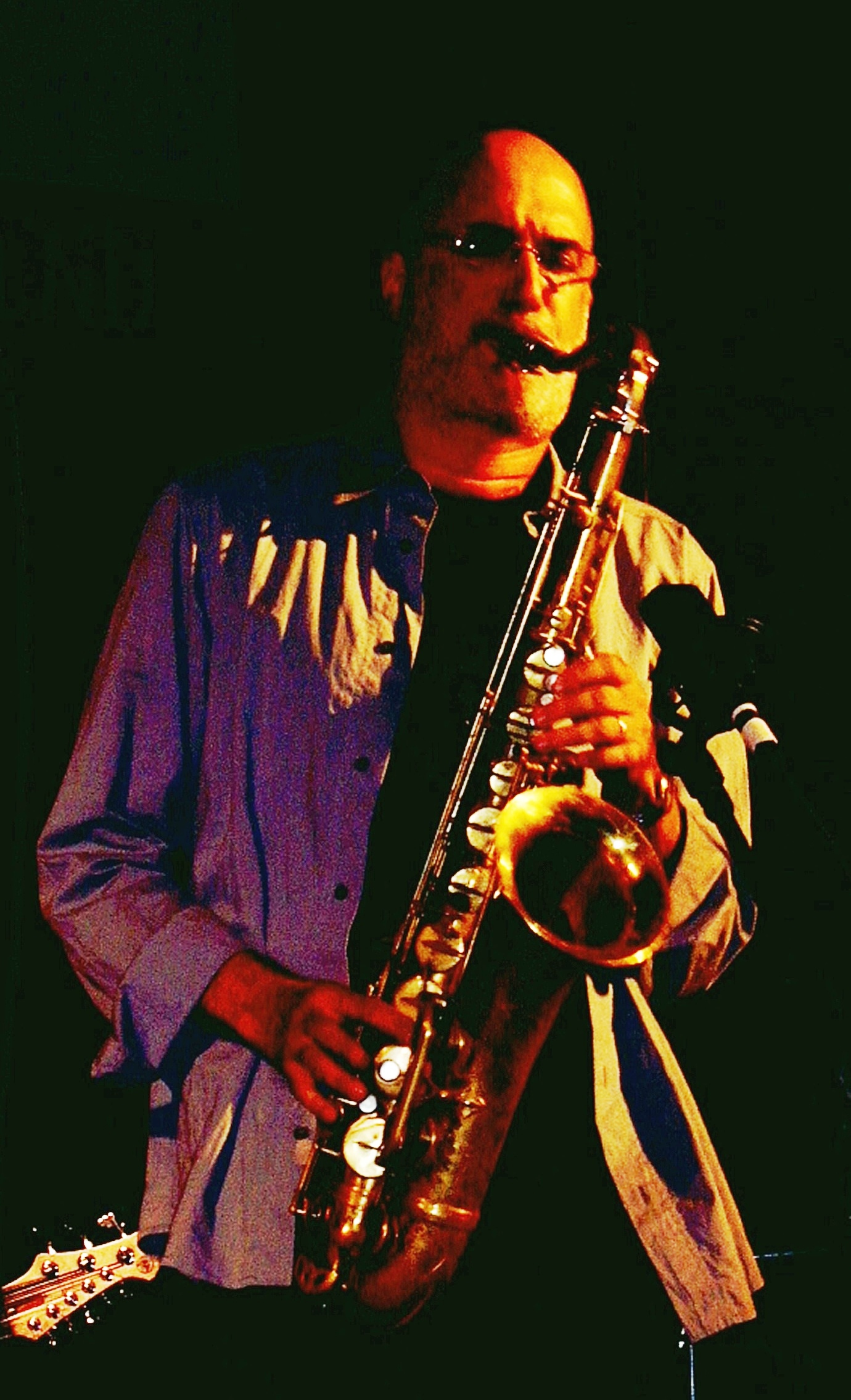
- Brecker performing in July 2004

Background information
- Born: Michael Leonard Brecker; March 29, 1949; Philadelphia, Pennsylvania, U.S.
- Died: January 13, 2007 (aged 57) Manhattan, New York City, U.S.
- Genres: Jazz; post-bop; jazz fusion; funk; R&B; rock
- Occupations: Musician; composer
- Instruments: Tenor saxophone; drums; EWI
- Years active: 1969–2006
- Formerly of: Brecker Brothers; Steps Ahead
- Website: michaelbrecker.com

Michael Leonard Brecker (March 29, 1949 – January 13, 2007) was an American jazz saxophonist and composer. Over a four‑decade career, he recorded widely in jazz and popular music and appeared on more than 900 albums as a leader and sideman. He received 15 Grammy Awards from the Recording Academy, was inducted into the DownBeat Hall of Fame in 2007, and received an honorary doctor of music degree from Berklee College of Music in 2004. He died in New York City in 2007 from complications of leukemia following a 2005 diagnosis of myelodysplastic syndrome.

== Early life and education ==
Brecker was born to a Jewish family in Philadelphia, on March 29, 1949, and raised in the local suburb of Cheltenham Township, Pennsylvania. He was raised in an artistic household: his father, Bob (Bobby), was a lawyer who played jazz piano and his mother, Sylvia, was a portrait artist. Michael was exposed to jazz at an early age by his father. He began studying clarinet at age six, then moved to the alto saxophone in the eighth grade, settling on the tenor saxophone as his primary instrument in his sophomore year of high school.

He graduated from Cheltenham High School in 1967 and spent that summer at the Berklee College of Music in Boston. In fall 1967, he followed his older brother, Randy, to Indiana University in Bloomington, Indiana, where he formed a jazz rock group with trumpet player Randy Sandke, which other students called Mrs. Seamon's Sound Band, named after a dormitory official who disliked longhaired students.

== Career ==
Mrs. Seamon's Sound Band were finalists in the competition at the spring 1968 Notre Dame Collegiate Jazz Festival, but were disqualified for their interpretation of The Doors song "Light My Fire". The band also performed outdoors on campus in a benefit for presidential candidate Eugene McCarthy in that year's presidential election. Following that semester, the band accepted a management offer and moved to Chicago, where drugs and a love triangle led to a suicide, which brought Chicago police to the manager's apartment, where all of the band except Sandke and Brecker, neither of whom were at the scene, were arrested. More trauma followed, and according to Randy Sandke, these events had an adverse psychological impact on Brecker which led to later substance abuse.

During the fall 1968 semester at Indiana University, Brecker formed a trio, which included the drummer from Mrs. Seamon's Sound Band, and played gigs at a church basement club called the Owl. Some of that was recorded. He dropped out before the end of the semester, spent a month in Mexico City, then returned to Philadelphia, where he played with Eric Gravatt, Billy Paul, and others.

Brecker moved to New York City in 1969, where he carved out a niche for himself as a dynamic and exciting jazz soloist. He first made his mark aged 20 as a member of the jazz-rock band Dreams, a band that included his older brother, trumpeter Randy Brecker; trombonist Barry Rogers; drummer Billy Cobham; keyboardist Jeff Kent; and bassist Doug Lubahn. Dreams was short-lived, lasting only from 1969 through 1972, though Miles Davis was appeared at some of their gigs prior to his recording Jack Johnson (1971).

Most of Brecker's early work is marked by an approach informed as much by rock guitar as by R&B saxophone. After Dreams, he worked with Horace Silver and then Billy Cobham before once again teaming up with his brother Randy to form the Brecker Brothers. This band followed jazz-funk trends of the time, but with more attention to structured arrangements, a heavier backbeat, and a stronger rock influence. The band stayed together from 1975 to 1982, with consistent success and musicality. In 1977, he founded the Seventh Avenue South jazz club with his brother Randy.

=== Sideman and leader ===
Brecker was in great demand as a soloist, sideman, and session musician. He performed with bands whose styles ranged from mainstream jazz to mainstream rock. Altogether, he appeared on nearly 900 albums, either as a band member or a guest soloist. He put his stamp on numerous pop and rock recordings as a soloist, including notable work with James Taylor and Paul Simon. Other sessions included albums with Steely Dan, Lou Reed, Donald Fagen, Dire Straits, Joni Mitchell, Eric Clapton, Mark Knopfler, Billy Joel, John Lennon, Aerosmith, Dan Fogelberg, Kenny Loggins, Frank Sinatra, Frank Zappa, Bruce Springsteen, Roger Daltrey, Parliament-Funkadelic, Cameo, Yoko Ono, Todd Rundgren, Chaka Khan, Orleans, Blue Öyster Cult, The Manhattan Transfer, Average White Band, The Players Association, Everything but the Girl, Patti Austin, Art Garfunkel, Carly Simon, The Brothers Johnson, Karen Carpenter, Garland Jeffreys, Casiopea, and T-Square.

Brecker also recorded (or performed) with many leading jazz musicians of his era, including Herbie Hancock, Chick Corea, Hal Galper, Chet Baker, Jan Akkerman, George Benson, Quincy Jones, Charles Mingus, Jaco Pastorius, McCoy Tyner, Pat Metheny, Elvin Jones, Claus Ogerman, Billy Cobham, Horace Silver, Mike Stern, Mike Mainieri, Max Roach, Steps Ahead, Dave Holland, Joey Calderazzo, Kenny Kirkland, Bob James, Grant Green, Don Cherry, Hubert Laws, Don Alias, Larry Goldings, Bob Mintzer, Gary Burton, Yusef Lateef, Steve Gadd, Richard Tee, Dave Brubeck, Charlie Haden, John Abercrombie, Vince Mendoza, Roy Hargrove, and Spyro Gyra, as well as for French zeuhl-band Magma.

Brecker played tenor saxophone on two Billy Joel albums. In 1983, Brecker played on three tracks on the album An Innocent Man ("Careless Talk", "Tell Her About It", and "Keeping the Faith"). In 1986, he played on "Big Man on Mulberry Street" on the album The Bridge.

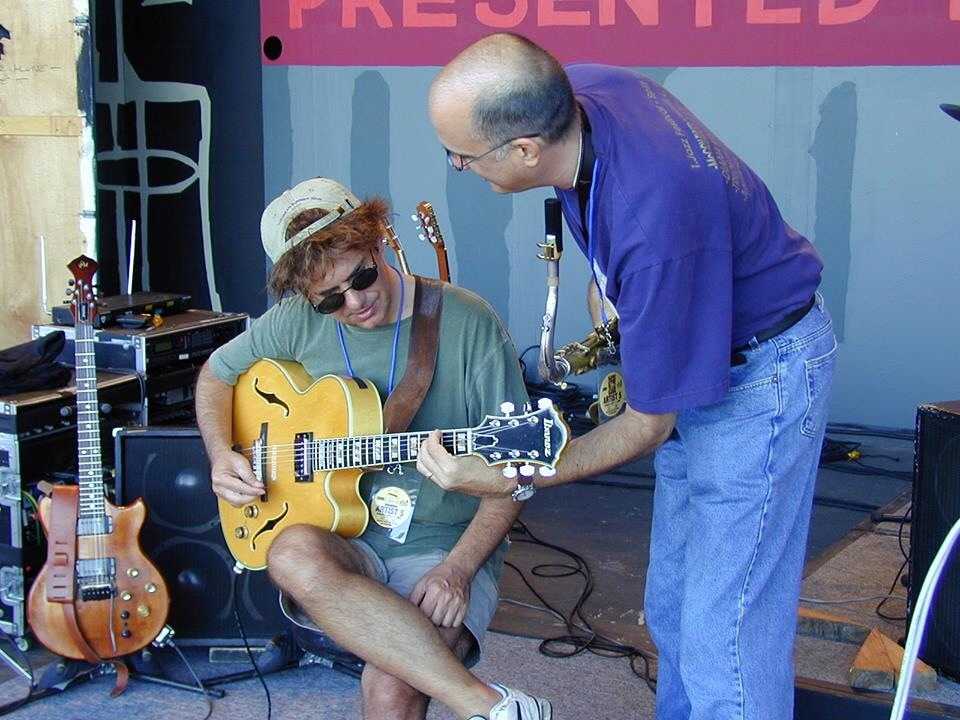
Brecker with guitarist Pat Metheny at the Monterey Jazz Festival, 2000

During the early 1980s, he was also a member of NBC's Saturday Night Live Band. Brecker can be seen in the background sporting sunglasses during Eddie Murphy's James Brown parody. After a stint co-leading the all-star group Steps Ahead with Mike Mainieri, Brecker recorded a solo album in 1987. That eponymously titled debut album marked his return to a more traditional jazz setting, highlighting his compositional talents, and featuring the EWI (Electronic Wind Instrument), which he had previously played with Steps Ahead. In 1987, he featured his new solo album at the JVC Newport Jazz Festival, incorporating the EWI. Brecker continued to record albums as a leader throughout the 1990s and 2000s, winning multiple Grammy Awards.

He went on tour in 2001 with a collaborative group, Hancock–Brecker–Hargrove. This tour was dedicated to jazz pioneers John Coltrane and Miles Davis. Brecker paid homage to Coltrane by performing Coltrane's signature piece, "Naima". The concert CD from the tour, Directions in Music: Live at Massey Hall (2002), won a Grammy in 2003.

=== Illness and death ===
While performing at the Mount Fuji Jazz Festival in 2004, Brecker experienced a sharp pain in his back. Shortly thereafter in 2005, he was diagnosed with the blood disorder myelodysplastic syndrome (MDS). Despite a widely publicized worldwide search, including an attempt to find a match amongst the Ashkenazi Jewish community, Brecker was unable to find a matching stem cell donor. In late 2005, he was the recipient of an experimental partial matching stem cell transplant. By late 2006, he appeared to be recovering, but the treatment proved not to be a cure. He made his final public performance on June 23, 2006, playing with Herbie Hancock at Carnegie Hall. Brecker died from complications of leukemia in a Manhattan hospital. His funeral was held on January 15, 2007, in Hastings-on-Hudson, New York.

== Instruments ==
Early in his career, Brecker played a Selmer Super Balanced Action tenor saxophone, later moving to a lacquer-finished Selmer Mark VI with a silver-plated neck, fitted with a Dave Guardala MB1 mouthpiece and LaVoz medium reeds. His earlier mouthpieces included a metal Otto Link "New York" Super Tone Master (during the mid-1970s) and a metal Dukoff in the late 1970s and early 1980s.

From 1986/7 onwards he played EWI (Electronic Wind Instrument), starting with a Kyle Steiner EWI "Steinerphone", one of only a handful made. A couple of years later, he moved on to the first Akai version, the EWI1000 with built-in MIDI. By 1991, his EWI was controlling two racks of modules including a Lexicon JamMan, and an Oberheim Matrix 12 synth – this configuration is visible in the 1991 Paul Simon's Concert in the Park. Nyle Steiner continued to develop and adapt instruments for Brecker, including the 2004 Rad EWI (which is played with the hands side-by-side, rather than one above the other) and a newer in-line model, while Michael moved away from racks of sound modules to a wireless PowerBook/Logic–based system.

Brecker also played the drums as he often talked about time, or rhythm, being musically the most important. He displayed his drum prowess during shows with his own ensembles or accompanying students during masterclasses.

== Legacy ==
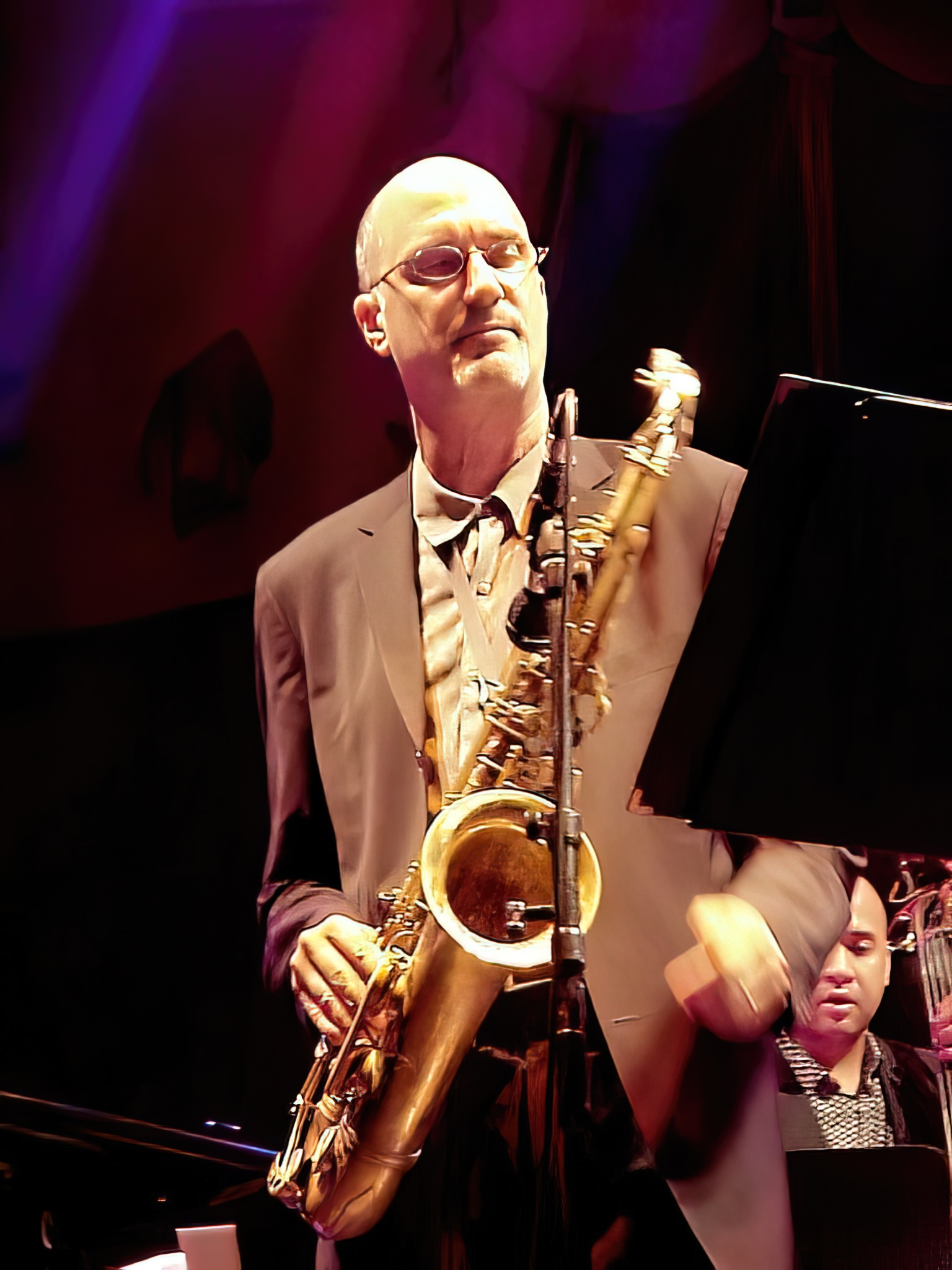
Brecker in Munich, July 2001

On February 11, 2007, Brecker was awarded two posthumous Grammy Awards for his involvement on his brother Randy's 2005 album Some Skunk Funk.

On May 22, 2007, his final recording, Pilgrimage, was released and received a good critical response. It was recorded in August 2006 with Pat Metheny on guitar, John Patitucci on bass, Jack DeJohnette on drums, and Herbie Hancock and Brad Mehldau on piano. Brecker was critically ill when it was recorded, but the other musicians involved praised the standard of his musicianship. Brecker was again posthumously awarded two additional Grammy Awards for this album in the categories of Best Jazz Instrumental Solo and Best Jazz Instrumental Album, Individual or Group, bringing his Grammy total to 15.

Brecker's search in the International Bone Marrow Registry for a match prompted his wife and manager to organize a series of bone marrow drives throughout the world, including at the Red Sea, Monterey, and Newport Jazz Festivals. Brecker was subsequently featured in a film directed by Noah Hutton (son of Debra Winger and Timothy Hutton), named More to Live For. It documents Brecker's battle with leukemia and the production of his final recording. By going public with his illness, Brecker raised tens of thousands of dollars for testing and signed up many thousands of donors, but was unable to find a match for himself.

Herbie Hancock said that around nine months before his death, Brecker had started practicing Buddhism and three months later joined Soka Gakkai International, a group associated with Nichiren Buddhism. At Brecker's memorial service, Hancock, Wayne Shorter, and Buster Williams (who all practice the same form of Buddhism) as well as Brecker's son, Sam, sat in a line with their backs to the audience while facing an inscribed scroll (Gohonzon) hanging in a wooden shrine (Butsudan) and chanted, "Namu Myōhō Renge Kyō", a Japanese sacred phrase meaning "Devotion to the Mystic Dharma of the Lotus Flower Sutra", for five minutes.

Brecker's widow, Susan, organized two benefit concerts, the first in 2015 and the latter in 2017. The events were dubbed "The Nearness of You" concerts and were held at Jazz at Lincoln Center's Appel Room. The concerts aimed to support cancer research at Columbia University Medical Center (CUMC) and the work of doctors Azra Raza and Siddhartha Mukherjee. Guest performers included James Taylor, Paul Simon, Chaka Khan, Randy Brecker, Dianne Reeves, Bobby McFerrin, Diana Krall, Wynton Marsalis, Will Lee, Gil Goldstein, Antonio Sanchez, John Patitucci, Adam Rogers, Mike Mainieri, Andy Snitzer, Jack DeJohnette, Chase Baird, Jeff "Tain" Watts, Robert Glasper, Dave Liebman, Joe Lovano, Ravi Coltrane, Nir Felder, Eli Degibri, and others.

The Michael Brecker Archive was established in 2013 at William Paterson University in Wayne, New Jersey, in collaboration with Susan Brecker, with Randy Brecker acting as advisor. The archive contains original pencil and ink tune manuscripts covering Brecker's solo career and collaborations with Elvin Jones, Pat Metheny, Paul Simon, Horace Silver, Herbie Hancock, Chick Corea, and others; three EWIs; mouthpieces, reeds, and other equipment; over 250 commercially released LPs and CDs; over 1200 hours of unreleased live recordings and studio mixes on cassettes, DATs, and other digital media; nine practice journals spanning from Brecker's time at Indiana University to the late 1990s; music books from his personal collection; an extensive clippings file; business materials; tour itineraries and record company/tour promotional materials; and over 1500 unreleased photos.

== Selected discography ==
Brecker in Hamburg, 1981

=== As leader/co-leader ===
- 1975: The Brecker Bros. with the Brecker Brothers
- 1976: Back to Back with the Brecker Brothers
- 1976: Don't Stop the Music with the Brecker Brothers
- 1978: Heavy Metal Be-Bop with the Brecker Brothers
- 1980: Detente with the Brecker Brothers
- 1981: Straphangin' with the Brecker Brothers
- 1982: Cityscape (Michael Brecker and Claus Ogerman) with Marcus Miller, Eddie Gómez, Steve Gadd, and Paulinho da Costa
- 1983: Steps Ahead with Mike Mainieri, Eddie Gómez, Peter Erskine, and Eliane Elias
- 1984: Modern Times with Mike Mainieri, Eddie Gómez, Peter Erskine, and Warren Bernhardt
- 1986: Magnetic with Steps Ahead – Victor Bailey, Mike Mainieri, Peter Erskine, Chuck Loeb, Kenny Kirkland, Hiram Bullock, Paul Jackson Jr., Peter Schwimmer, Mitchel Forman, and Dianne Reeves
- 1987: Michael Brecker with Pat Metheny, Kenny Kirkland, Charlie Haden, and Jack DeJohnette
- 1988: Don't Try This at Home
- 1990: Now You See It... (Now You Don't)
- 1992: Return of the Brecker Brothers with the Brecker Brothers
- 1994: Out of the Loop with the Brecker Brothers
- 1996: Tales from the Hudson with Pat Metheny, Joey Calderazzo, McCoy Tyner, Dave Holland, Jack DeJohnette, and Don Alias
- 1998: Two Blocks from the Edge with Joey Calderazzo, James Genus, Jeff "Tain" Watts, and Don Alias
- 1999: Time Is of the Essence with Larry Goldings, Pat Metheny, Elvin Jones, Jeff "Tain" Watts, and Bill Stewart
- 2001: Nearness of You: The Ballad Book with Pat Metheny, Herbie Hancock, Charlie Haden, Jack DeJohnette, James Taylor
- 2003: Wide Angles
- 2007: Some Skunk Funk with Randy Brecker
- 2007: Pilgrimage with John Patitucci, Jack DeJohnette, Pat Metheny, Herbie Hancock, and Brad Mehldau

=== As sideman ===
- 1969: Score – Randy Brecker
- 1970: Dreams – Dreams
- 1971: Air – Air
- 1971: Imagine My Surprise – Dreams
- 1971: The Guerilla Band – Hal Galper (Mainstream)
- 1972: Wild Bird – Hal Galper (Mainstream)
- 1972: Bridging a Gap – Mark Murphy (Muse)
- 1972: One Man Dog – James Taylor
- 1972: Something/Anything? – Todd Rundgren
- 1972: The Section – The Section (band)
- 1973: Berlin – Lou Reed
- 1973: A Wizard, a True Star – Todd Rundgren
- 1973: Mind Games – John Lennon
- 1973: In Pursuit of the 27th Man – Horace Silver
- 1974: Todd – Todd Rundgren
- 1974: The Chicago Theme – Hubert Laws (CTI)
- 1974: Crosswinds – Billy Cobham (Atlantic)
- 1974: Journey – Arif Mardin (Atlantic)
- 1974: Hotcakes – Carly Simon
- 1974: Walking Man – James Taylor
- 1974: Get Your Wings – Aerosmith (Columbia)
- 1974: It's Always Dark Before the Dawn – Jonah (20th Century Records)
- 1974: Waitin' for the Change – Jonah (20th Century Records)
- 1975: The Rape of El Morro – Don Sebesky (CTI)
- 1975: Good King Bad – George Benson (CTI)
- 1975: Shabazz – Billy Cobham
- 1975: A Funky Thide of Sings – Billy Cobham
- 1975: Still Crazy After All These Years – Paul Simon
- 1975: Mothership Connection – Parliament
- 1975: Born to Run – Bruce Springsteen
- 1976: At the Sound of the Bell – Pavlov's Dog
- 1976: The Main Attraction – Grant Green (Kudu)
- 1976: Tring-a-Ling – Joanne Brackeen
- 1976: End of a Rainbow – Patti Austin
- 1976: The Art of Tea – Michael Franks
- 1976: Songs for the New Depression – Bette Midler
- 1976: Ringo's Rotogravure – Ringo Starr
- 1976: Blue Moves – Elton John
- 1976: Smile – Laura Nyro
- 1976: In the Pocket – James Taylor
- 1976: Good King Bad – George Benson
- 1976: Jaco Pastorius – Jaco Pastorius
- 1976: Hear & Now – Don Cherry
- 1976: Reach Out! – Hal Galper (SteepleChase)
- 1976: Red Beans – Jimmy McGriff (Groove Merchant)
- 1977: Mel Lewis and Friends − Mel Lewis (A&M/Horizon)
- 1977: Ghost Writer – Garland Jeffreys
- 1977: Havana Candy – Patti Austin
- 1977: "Live at the Berlin Philharmonic" – Hal Galper
- 1977: Tightrope – Steve Khan
- 1977: Sleeping Gypsy – Michael Franks
- 1977: Lady Put the Light Out – Frankie Valli
- 1977: You Can't Live Without It – Jack Wilkins
- 1977: Never Letting Go – Phoebe Snow
- 1977: Ghost Writer – Garland Jeffreys
- 1977: Ringo the 4th – Ringo Starr
- 1977: You Can't Go Home Again – Chet Baker
- 1977: The Best Thing for You – Chet Baker
- 1978: Zappa in New York – Frank Zappa
- 1978: Love Explosion – Tina Turner
- 1978: The Blue Man – Steve Khan
- 1978: Phonogenic – Not Just Another Pretty Face – Melanie
- 1978: Double Fun – Robert Palmer
- 1978: Against the Grain – Phoebe Snow
- 1978: One-Eyed Jack – Garland Jeffreys
- 1978: Chaka – Chaka Khan
- 1978: Boys in the Trees – Carly Simon
- 1978: Clayton – David Clayton-Thomas
- 1978: Live at the Bottom Line – Patti Austin
- 1978: Merge – Jack Wilkins
- 1978: Cheryl Lynn – Cheryl Lynn
- 1979: Shadows and Light – Joni Mitchell with Pat Metheny, Jaco Pastorius, Lyle Mays and Don Alias
- 1979: In a Temple Garden – Yusef Lateef
- 1979: Arrows – Steve Khan
- 1979: Keep the Fire – Kenny Loggins
- 1979: Spy – Carly Simon
- 1979: Thighs and Whispers – Bette Midler
- 1979: In Out and Around – Mike Nock Quartet with Mike Nock (p), Michael Brecker (ts) and Al Foster (d)
- 1979: Fate for Breakfast – Art Garfunkel
- 1979: Casiopea – Casiopea
- 1979: To Touch You Again – John Tropea
- 1980: Gaucho – Steely Dan
- 1980: To Chi Ka – Kazumi Watanabe (Columbia)
- 1980: Body Language – Patti Austin
- 1980: Aretha – Aretha Franklin
- 1980: Naughty – Chaka Khan
- 1980: 80/81 – Pat Metheny
- 1980: Candi Staton – Candi Staton
- 1981: Escape Artist – Garland Jeffreys
- 1981: Scissors Cut – Art Garfunkel
- 1981: Word of Mouth – Jaco Pastorius
- 1981: Torch – Carly Simon
- 1981: The Innocent Age – Dan Fogelberg
- 1981: Three Quartets – Chick Corea
- 1981: Season of Glass – Yoko Ono
- 1982: The Nightfly – Donald Fagen
- 1982: Objects of Desire – Michael Franks
- 1982: Peter Erskine – Peter Erskine
- 1983: Pacific Fire – George Benson
- 1983: In My Life – Patti Austin
- 1983: Hello Big Man – Carly Simon
- 1983: In Your Eyes – George Benson
- 1983: Emergency – Melissa Manchester
- 1983: Wins – Franco Ambrosetti (Enja)
- 1983: An Innocent Man – Billy Joel
- 1983: Fast Emotion – UZEB
- 1984: Valotte – Julian Lennon
- 1984: New Sensations – Lou Reed
- 1984: L.A. Is My Lady – Frank Sinatra
- 1984: Night – John Abercrombie
- 1984: Mobo I – Kazumi Watanabe
- 1984: Mobo II – Kazumi Watanabe
- 1985: Brothers in Arms – Dire Straits
- 1985: Tentets – Franco Ambrosetti (Enja)
- 1985: Mastertouch (Torsten de Winkel (g), with (b), Alphonse Mouzon (dr), Joachim Kühn (p))
- 1985: That's Why I'm Here – James Taylor
- 1985: Gettin' Away with Murder – Patti Austin
- 1985: Amanda – Eliane Elias and Randy Brecker
- 1985: Mezgo – Eddie Gómez
- 1985: Skin Dive – Michael Franks
- 1986: The Bridge – Billy Joel
- 1986: Word Up! – Cameo
- 1986: August – Eric Clapton
- 1986: Destiny – Chaka Khan
- 1986: A House Full of Love – Grover Washington Jr.
- 1986: Gil Evans and His Orchestra with Gil Evans and His Orchestra – VHS, later DVD-Video in 2007
- 1986: Hearts and Numbers – Don Grolnick
- 1987: Exiles – Dan Fogelberg
- 1987: The Camera Never Lies – Michael Franks
- 1987: Coming Around Again – Carly Simon
- 1988: Times Like These – Gary Burton
- 1988: Getting There – John Abercrombie
- 1988: Patti Austin – Patti Austin
- 1988: Lefty – Art Garfunkel
- 1988: Time in Place – Mike Stern
- 1988: Never Die Young – James Taylor
- 1989: Soul Provider – Michael Bolton
- 1989: City Streets – Carole King
- 1989: So Far So Close – Eliane Elias
- 1990: The Language of Life – Everything but the Girl
- 1990: Have You Seen Me Lately – Carly Simon
- 1990: The Rhythm of the Saints – Paul Simon
- 1990: Master Plan – Dave Weckl
- 1990: My Romance – Carly Simon
- 1991: New Moon Shine – James Taylor
- 1991: I'm on Your Side – Jennifer Holliday
- 1991: Don't Call Me Buckwheat – Garland Jeffreys
- 1993: Walk the Dog and Light the Light – Laura Nyro
- 1994: Crossings – Steve Khan
- 1994: SMAP 006: Sexy Six – SMAP (Victor)
- 1995: Young Lions & Old Tigers – Dave Brubeck (Telarc)
- 1995: Infinity – McCoy Tyner (Impulse!)
- 1995: Strength – Toko Furuuchi (Sony)
- 1995: Beauty and Harmony – Miwa Yoshida (Epic/Sony)
- 1995: Abandoned Garden – Michael Franks
- 1996: The New Standard – Herbie Hancock (Verve)
- 1996: Across America – Art Garfunkel
- 1996: Stardust – Natalie Cole
- 1996: Wilderness – Tony Williams
- 1996: Merge – Jack Wilkins with Randy Brecker, recorded in 1977
- 1996: Village – Wallace Roney
- 1997: West Side Story – Dave Grusin
- 1997: Give and Take – Mike Stern
- 1997: Hourglass – James Taylor
- 1997: A Story – Yoko Ono
- 1998: Eliane Elias Sings Jobim – Eliane Elias
- 1999: The Truth: Heard Live at the Blue Note – Elvin Jones (Half Note)
- 1999: Timeless: The Classics Vol. 2 – Michael Bolton
- 1999: Barefoot on the Beach – Michael Franks
- 1999: What It Is – Jacky Terrasson
- 2000: "Cyrus Chestnut and Friends: A Charlie Brown Christmas" with Cyrus Chestnut
- 2001: Reunion – Jack Wilkins with Randy Brecker
- 2001: Drum'n voice (All that Groove) – Billy Cobham [Nicolosi Productions]
- 2002: Rendezvous in New York with Chick Corea's Three Quartets Band
- 2002: American Dreams with Charlie Haden
- 2002: October Road – James Taylor
- 2002: Live in Paris (2002) (aka A Night in Paris)
- 2003: Louis Bellson and His Big Band with Michael Brecker, Randy Brecker, Herb Geller, Benny Bailey, Howard Johnson, and Lew Soloff
- 2003: Nature Boy: The Standards Album – Aaron Neville
- 2004: Dreamer – Eliane Elias
- 2004: The Passage Andy Narell – Song for Mia Solo
- 2004: Live from the Village Vanguard, Vol. 3 with the John Abercrombie Quartet
- 2004: Horacio Hernandez: Live at the Modern Drummer Festival with Marc Quiñones, Michael Brecker, John Patitucci, and Hilario Durán
- 2005: Listen Here! with Eddie Palmieri
- 2005: In The Now – Darren Kramer Organization
