= Brecker Brothers =

American jazz fusion band (1974–2007)

- Origin: New York City, New York, U.S.
- Genres: Jazz fusion, jazz-funk
- Years active: 1974–2007
- Labels: Arista, BMG, GRP, Novus
- Past members: Randy Brecker; Michael Brecker

The Brecker Brothers were a jazz fusion music duo consisting of siblings Michael and Randy. Michael played saxophone, flute, and EWI, and Randy played trumpet and flugelhorn. The brothers attended Cheltenham High School in Wyncote, Pennsylvania.

Randy (born 1945) became famous as an original member of the group Blood, Sweat & Tears. He appeared on their debut album Child Is Father to the Man in 1968. Michael (1949 - 2007) first appeared on record supporting Randy on his debut solo album, titled Score, which was released in 1969. In 1970 and 1971 the brothers were members of the group Dreams who recorded two albums for Columbia Records.

The brothers frequently played together, and individually, as session musicians on recordings by other artists. They were heard on Todd Rundgren's hit "Hello It's Me", which reached No. 5 on the Billboard Hot 100 chart in 1973. Other notable appearances include Parliament's Mothership Connection and the debut album of the Japanese fusion group Casiopea. They also appeared on Bruce Springsteen's 1975 album Born to Run.

The brothers were encouraged to start their own group by an executive at Arista Records. Between 1975 and 1981 they released six albums on Arista as The Brecker Brothers. The group had a hit single with "East River" in 1979. It reached No. 34 in the UK Singles Chart.

The duo backed up Frank Zappa on the live album Zappa in New York. The recordings were made during a special appearance of the brothers with members of the Saturday Night Live Band at Zappa concerts at the Palladium in December 1976.

The brothers appeared with Quincy Jones on the 1984 Frank Sinatra album L.A. Is My Lady and on Eric Clapton's 1986 album August. Between 1992 and 1994 the Brecker Brothers released two more albums under their own name on GRP Records.

Both brothers also had prolific recording careers as leaders of their own ensembles. Their collaboration ended in 2007 when Michael Brecker died from leukemia.

== Discography ==
=== Studio albums ===
- The Brecker Bros. (Arista, 1975)
- Back to Back (Arista, 1976)
- Don’t Stop the Music (Arista, 1977)
- Detente (Arista, 1980)
- Straphangin' (Arista, 1981)
- Return of the Brecker Brothers (GRP, 1992)
- Out of the Loop (GRP, 1994) - 37th Annual Grammy Awards Best Contemporary Jazz Performance

=== Live albums ===
- Heavy Metal Be-Bop (Arista, 1978)
- The Bottom Line Archive Series - The Brecker Brothers (Bottom Line, 2015) - recorded 1976
- Live and Unreleased (Leopard, 2020) - recorded 1980

=== Compilation albums ===
- The Brecker Bros. Collection, Vol 1 (RCA Novus, 1990)
- The Brecker Bros. Collection, Vol 2 (RCA Novus, 1991)

=== As sideman ===
- Jack Wilkins, Merge (Chiaroscuro, 1992) - recorded in 1977
- Jack Wilkins, Reunion (Chiaroscuro, 2001)
