= Hideaway (David Sanborn album) =

Studio album by David Sanborn
- Released: February 15, 1980
- Studios: Celebration Recording Studio, Inc., New York, NY
- Genres: Jazz fusion, smooth jazz
- Length: 37:37
- Label: Warner Bros.
- Producer: Michael Colina

David Sanborn chronology
| Heart to Heart (1978) | Hideaway (1980) | Voyeur (1981) |

Professional ratings
Review scores
| Source | Rating |
|---|---|
| AllMusic | 4/5 stars |
| DownBeat | 3.5/5 stars |

Hideaway is the fifth studio album by American jazz fusion artist David Sanborn, released by Warner Bros. Records in February 1980. The album was produced by Michael Colina.

It was recorded at Celebration Recording Studios in New York in 1979, with the album cover depicting sunset along a shoreline. This album performed well on the Billboard jazz and R&B charts, peaking at No. 2 and No. 33, respectively.

== Track listing ==
All tracks are written by David Sanborn, except as indicated.

| No. | Title | Writer(s) | Notes | Length |
|---|---|---|---|---|
| 1. | "Hideaway" | David Sanborn | shorter edit (3:47) on current digital/streaming album | 5:53 |
| 2. | "Carly's Song" | Sanborn | | 5:12 |
| 3. | "Anything You Want" | Sanborn, Michael McDonald | longer edit (5:15) on early LP pressings | 3:43 |
| 4. | "The Seduction (Love Theme)" | Giorgio Moroder | not included on early LP pressings | 3:54 |
| 5. | "Lisa" | Sanborn | | 4:28 |
| 6. | "If You Would Be Mine" | Michael Colina | | 4:37 |
| 7. | "Creeper" | Sanborn, John Evans | | 4:35 |
| 8. | "Again An Again" | Sanborn, Michael McDonald | | 5:15 |
| Total length: | | | | 37:37 |

== Personnel ==
Below is a list of personnel per the liner notes of the 1987 US CD reissue:

- David Sanborn – alto saxophone, soprano saxophone (1), tenor saxophone (1), Fender Rhodes (1, 5), handclaps (3), Hammond B3 organ (7)
- Michael Colina – synthesizers (1, 4), string arrangements (2, 5, 6, 8), Polymoog (3, 6–8), Crumar electric piano (3, 8), acoustic piano (4), Fender Rhodes (6), acoustic bass (7)
- Don Grolnick – clavinet (1, 3), Fender Rhodes (2, 7), acoustic piano (8)
- Paul Shaffer – Fender Rhodes (4)
- Rob Mounsey – Yamaha electric piano (6)
- Hiram Bullock – electric guitar (1)
- David Spinozza – electric guitar (3, 5, 6, 8), acoustic guitar (5, 6)
- Jeff Mironov – guitars (4)
- Danny Kortchmar – electric guitar (7)
- Waddy Wachtel – electric guitar (7)
- Neil Jason – bass (1, 3, 4, 6, 8), fretless bass (5)
- Marcus Miller – bass (2)
- John Evans – bass (7)
- Steve Gadd – drums (1, 3, 5, 6, 8)
- Rick Marotta – drums (2, 7)
- Buddy Williams – drums (4)
- Ray Bardani – percussion (1, 6), cowbell (3), handclaps (3), tambourine (3, 4, 8), hi-hat (7), cabasa (8)
- Ralph MacDonald – congas (1, 6), percussion (1, 2), finger cymbals (5), triangle (5)
- Michael Mainieri – electric vibraphone (2), marimba (2), bass marimba (2)
- Jody Linscott – congas (3, 5, 7, 8), cowbell (5), cabasa (7), devil stick (7)
- Lisa Nalven – handclaps (3)
- Spike – handclaps (3)
- Julian Fifer – cello (2, 5, 6, 8)
- Richard Sher – cello (2, 5, 6, 8)
- Ronnie Bauch – violin (2, 5, 6, 8)
- Guillermo Figueroa – violin (2, 5, 6, 8)
- William Henry – violin (2, 5, 6, 8)
- Benjamin Hudson – violin (2, 5, 6, 8)
- Joanna Jenner – violin (2, 5, 6, 8)
- How Liang-Ping – violin (2, 5, 6, 8)
- Ruth Waterman – violin (2, 5, 6, 8)
- Carol Zeavin – violin (2, 5, 6, 8)
- James Taylor – backing vocals (2)
- David Lasley – backing vocals (2)
- Arnold McCuller – backing vocals (2)
- Naimy Hackett – backing vocals (3)
- Bette Sussman – backing vocals (3)

Production

- John Simon – executive producer
- Michael Colina – producer
- Ray Bardani – producer (4), recording, mixing
- George Marino – mastering at Sterling Sound (New York, NY)
- Allen Grogin – production assistant
- Katherine Jewel – album coordinator
- Basil Pao – art direction, design
- Aram Gesar – cover photography
- David Gahr – portrait photography

== Chart positions ==
| Chart (1980) | Peak position |
|---|---|
| US Jazz | 2 |
| US R&B | 33 |
