= Backstreet (album) =

Studio album by David Sanborn
- Released: September 14, 1983
- Recorded: February–May 1983
- Studio: Minot Sound (White Plains, New York)
- Genre: Smooth jazz
- Length: 44:27
- Label: Warner Bros.
- Producer: Marcus Miller; Ray Bardani; Michael Colina

David Sanborn chronology
As We Speak (1982)	Backstreet (1983)	Straight to the Heart (1984)

Professional ratings
Review scores
Source	Rating
The Penguin Guide to Jazz Recordings	3/4 stars
The Rolling Stone Album Guide	3/5 stars

Backstreet is a 1983 album by David Sanborn. The album peaked at number one on the Billboard Traditional Jazz albums chart on January 27, 1984.

== Track listing ==
No.	Title	Writer(s)	Length
1.	"I Told U So"	David Sanborn; Hiram Bullock	5:02
2.	"When You Smile at Me"	Sanborn	5:46
3.	"Believer"	Marcus Miller	6:34
4.	"Backstreet"	Sanborn	5:27
5.	"A Tear for Crystal"	Sanborn, Miller	7:02
6.	"Bum's Cathedral"	Sanborn; Michael Colina	4:40
7.	"Blue Beach"	Sanborn, Miller	4:50
8.	"Neither One of Us (Wants to Be the First to Say Goodbye)"	Jim Weatherly	5:06
Total length:			44:27

== Personnel ==
- David Sanborn – alto saxophone, soprano saxophone, alto sax solos
- Marcus Miller – acoustic piano, Fender Rhodes, Roland Jupiter-8, Yamaha GS2, Oberheim OB-Xa, Prophet-5, vocoder, Moog bass, acoustic rhythm and solo guitars, electric rhythm and solo guitars, Fender bass, fretless bass, percussion, steel drums, timpani, backing vocals (1, 3), BGV arrangements (1)
- Michael Colina – acoustic piano (1, 2, 4, 6), Oberheim OB-Xa (1, 2, 4, 6), Roland Jupiter-8 (1, 2, 4, 6), vocoder (1, 2, 4, 6)
- Hiram Bullock – Fender Rhodes (1), Yamaha GS2 (1), Moog bass (1), electric rhythm and solo guitars (1)
- Steve Gadd – drums (1, 4)
- Ralph MacDonald – congas (2, 8), percussion (2, 8)
- Barry Johnson – backing vocals (3)
- Tawatha Agee – backing vocals (8)
- Yvonne Lewis – backing vocals (8)
- Luther Vandross – backing vocals (8)

Production

- Marcus Miller – producer
- Michael Colina – producer
- Ray Bardani – producer, recording, mixing
- Bruce Robbins – assistant engineer, technical maintenance
- Wayne Warnecke – assistant engineer
- George Marino – mastering at Sterling Sound (New York City, New York)
- Katherine Jewel – music contractor
- Shirley Klein – album coordinator
- Marc Silag – assistant production manager
- Simon Levy – art direction
- Laura LiPuma – design
- Lou Beach – front cover college
- Desiree Rohr – back cover illustration

== Charts ==
Chart (1984)	Peak position
US Billboard 200	81
US Traditional Jazz (Billboard)	1
US Top R&B/Hip-Hop Albums (Billboard)	21
