= Voyeur (David Sanborn album) =

Studio album by David Sanborn
- Released: 1981
- Recorded: 1980
- Studios: Minot Sound Studio (White Plains, New York); Warner Bros. Recording Studios and Jennifudy Studios (North Hollywood, California); Westlake Audio (Los Angeles, California)
- Genre: Smooth jazz
- Length: 29:37
- Label: Warner Bros.
- Producers: Michael Colina; Ray Bardani

David Sanborn chronology
Hideaway (1979)	Voyeur (1981)	As We Speak (1982)

Voyeur is the sixth studio album by American saxophonist David Sanborn, released on the Warner Bros. label in 1981.

== Reception ==
Professional ratings
Review scores
Source	Rating
AllMusic	4/5 stars
The Penguin Guide to Jazz	3/4 stars
The Rolling Stone Jazz Record Guide	3/5 stars

AllMusic's review by Scott Yanow states: "This 1980 recording is an excellent example of David Sanborn's music. The highly influential altoist is joined by familiar studio veterans (including guitarist Hiram Bullock and drummer Steve Gadd) with bassist/composer Marcus Miller being a key figure in creating the funky rhythms and colorful backgrounds."

The recording won the 1982 Grammy Award for Best R&B Instrumental Performance for the track "All I Need Is You". This was the first of seven Grammy Awards that have been achieved by the saxophonist to date. Buzz Feiten, riding high with the Larsen-Feiten Band at the time, adds his distinctive guitar tone to "Let's Just Say Goodbye".

== Track listing ==
1. "Let's Just Say Goodbye" (David Sanborn) – 4:35
2. "It's You" (Sanborn) – 5:11
3. "Wake Me When It's Over" (Sanborn, Marcus Miller) – 5:37
4. "One in a Million" (Sanborn) – 3:40
5. "Run for Cover" (Miller) – 3:13
6. "All I Need Is You" (Miller) – 5:43
7. "Just for You" (Miller) – 1:38

== Personnel ==
- David Sanborn – alto saxophone, Fender Rhodes (1, 2, 4), Wurlitzer electric piano (1), saxello (3, 5), percussion (4)
- Michael Colina – Oberheim OB-X (1, 6), Prophet-5 (6)
- Marcus Miller – bass guitar (1, 3, 5, 6), Moog bass (1, 2, 4), Fender Rhodes (3, 5, 6), Prophet-5 (3), electric guitar (3, 5, 6), drums (3), bells (6), acoustic piano (7)
- Buzz Feiten – electric guitar, acoustic guitar (1, 2)
- Hiram Bullock – electric guitar, percussion (4)
- Steve Gadd – drums (1, 2, 5, 6)
- Buddy Williams – drums (4), percussion (4)
- Lenny Castro – percussion (1, 2, 4), congas (2, 4), timbales (2)
- Ray Bardani – gong (3)
- Ralph MacDonald – percussion (6)
- Tom Scott – flute (5), tenor saxophone (5)
- Patti Austin – backing vocals (2)
- Kacey Cisyk – backing vocals (2)
- Lani Groves – backing vocals (2, 6)
- Valerie Simpson – backing vocals (2)
- Diva Gray – backing vocals (6)
- Gordon Grody – backing vocals (6)
- Hamish Stuart – backing vocals (6)

Production

- Michael Colina – producer
- Ray Bardani – producer, recording, mixing
- George Marino – mastering at Sterling Sound (New York, NY)
- Katherine Jewel – album coordinator
- Claire Moriece – production coordinator
- Christine Sauers – art direction, design
- Leonard F. Konopelski – illustration, lettering

== Awards ==
Grammy Awards

Year	Winner	Category
1981	David Sanborn ("All I Need is You")	Best R&B Instrumental Performance
