= Double Vision (Bob James and David Sanborn album) =

Studio album by Bob James and David Sanborn
- Released: 1986
- Studio: Clinton Recording Studios and Unique Recording Studios (New York City, New York)
- Genre: Smooth jazz
- Length: 43:30 (original album); 54:19 (2003 expanded and remastered edition)
- Label: Warner Bros.
- Producer: Tommy LiPuma

Bob James chronology
12 (1986)	Double Vision (1986)	Obsession (1986)

David Sanborn chronology
Straight to the Heart (1984)	Double Vision (1986)	A Change of Heart (1987)

Professional ratings
Review scores
Source	Rating
AllMusic	4/5 stars

Double Vision is a 1986 album by Bob James and David Sanborn. The album was a successful smooth jazz release receiving frequent airplay. The original album was released in the US on May 19, 1986, by Warner Bros Records. It was released a week later in the UK.

== Critical reception ==
Scott Yanow of AllMusic says, "One of the best recordings ever released under James' name (Sanborn gets co-billing)".

== Charts and accolades ==
The album spent 63 weeks on the Billboard charts, peaking at No. 16 on the R&B albums chart and No. 50 on the Top Pop Albums chart. In 1987, the album won the Grammy Award for Best Jazz Fusion Performance, Vocal or Instrumental and the song "Since I Fell for You" earned a nomination for Al Jarreau in the category Best R&B Vocal Performance, Male.

== Track listing ==
No.	Title	Writer(s)	Length
1.	"Maputo"	Marcus Miller	6:50
2.	"More Than Friends"	Miller	6:18
3.	"Moon Tune"	Bob James, David Sanborn	7:06
4.	"Since I Fell for You" (Vocal by Al Jarreau)	Woodrow "Buddy" Johnson	5:52
5.	"It's You"	Sanborn	5:16
6.	"Never Enough"	James, Sanborn	6:30
7.	"You Don't Know Me"	Cindy Walker, Eddy Arnold	5:36

2003 reissue bonus tracks
No.	Title	Writer(s)	Length
8.	"Luthor"		6:02
9.	"Hey, Girl"	Gerry Goffin, Carole King	4:46

== Personnel ==
- Bob James – keyboards, synthesizers, programming, rhythm arrangements, synthesizer arrangements
- David Sanborn – alto saxophone
- Robbie Kilgore – synthesizer programming
- Paul Jackson, Jr. – guitars
- Steve Gadd – drums
- Paulinho da Costa – percussion
- Marcus Miller – bass, rhythm arrangements (1, 2)
- Eric Gale – guitars (4, 7)
- Al Jarreau – vocal (4)
- Bob Riley – drum programming (5)

Production

- Tommy LiPuma – producer
- Bill Schnee – engineer, mixing, additional recording
- Bob James – additional recording
- Andy Cardenas – second engineer
- Gene Curtis – second engineer
- Dan Garcia – second engineer
- Peter Robbins – second engineer
- Doug Sax – mastering at The Mastering Lab (Hollywood, California)
- Larry Fishman – production coordinator
- Laura LiPuma – art direction, design
- Eric Blum – cover artwork

Track information and credits adapted from the album's liner notes.

== Charts ==
Chart (1986)	Peak position
US Top Pop Albums (Billboard)	50
US Top R&B Albums (Billboard)	16
