= Hiram Bullock =

American jazz guitarist (1955–2008)

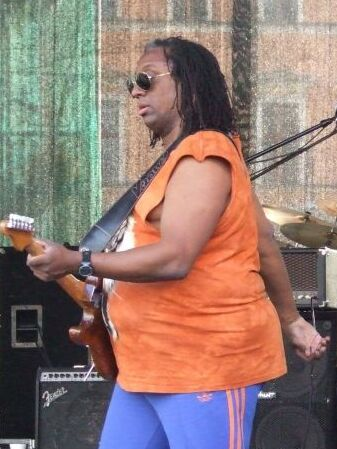
- Bullock in 2006

Background information
- Born: Hiram Law Bullock; September 11, 1955; Osaka, Japan
- Died: July 25, 2008 (aged 52) Manhattan, New York, U.S.
- Genres: Jazz, jazz fusion
- Instrument: Guitar

Hiram Law Bullock (September 11, 1955 – July 25, 2008) was a Japanese-born American guitarist known mainly for playing in jazz funk and jazz fusion, but he also worked as a session musician in a variety of genres.

== Biography ==
Bullock was born in Osaka, Japan, to African American parents serving in the U.S. military. At the age of two he returned to Baltimore, Maryland, with his parents and showed musical talent. He studied piano at the city's Peabody Conservatory of Music, giving his first public performance at the age of six. After playing saxophone and bass guitar, he took up the electric guitar at age sixteen.

Bullock attended McDonogh School for Boys in Reisterstown, Maryland. He was captain of the band in middle school. He studied at the University of Miami, where he met guitarists Pat Metheny and Steve Morse, and bass players Jaco Pastorius and Will Lee. He paid for tuition by performing at nightclubs in Florida before moving to New York. He became best known for playing with Lee on Late Night with David Letterman and working with David Sanborn and Bob James. His work can be heard on Steely Dan's Gaucho (1980), Paul Simon's One Trick Pony (1980), Sting's ...Nothing Like the Sun (1987) and Billy Joel's The Stranger (1977). He also worked with Harry Belafonte, Marcus Miller, Carla Bley, Miles Davis, Ruben Rada, and Gil Evans.

He recorded as a member of the 24th Street Band, which released three albums: 24th Street Band (1979), Share Your Dreams (1980) and Bokutachi (1981). In 1982, he released his debut album, First Class Vagabond, which was exclusively distributed for the Japanese market by the JVC-Victor Company and later reissued on CD. Also in 1982, he was an original member of The World's Most Dangerous Band, the house band on the NBC-TV program Late Night with David Letterman. He stayed with Letterman's show for about two years.

In 1986, Bullock released his first album as a leader for Atlantic Records called From All Sides, followed by the albums Give It What You Got in 1987, and Way Kool in 1990.

Shortly after the Atlantic albums, he recorded a few tracks from those sessions for a live event at the Indigo Blues Venue, in order to release it in Japan. His live band from the Indigo Blues sessions included Dave Delhomme (keyboards), Steve Logan (bass guitar), and Steven Wolf (drums).

On May 27, 2004, he teamed up with drummer Billy Cobham and the WDR Big Band for a performance of the works of Jimi Hendrix at the University of Cologne in Germany. An album of this performance was released posthumously in 2008.

He had his own signature model guitars made by Cort, the HBS & HBS-II.

After overcoming a bout of throat cancer in 2007, Bullock succumbed to his intermittent but long habit of substance abuse and died after a "crack binge" on July 25, 2008, in New York City, at the age of 52. Letterman band leader Paul Shaffer said after his death that Bullock “was the greatest guitar player ever, with the exception perhaps of Jimi Hendrix. Nobody was ever better.”

== Discography ==
=== As leader ===
- First Class Vagabond (Trio, 1982)
- From All Sides (Atlantic, 1986)
- Give It What U Got (Atlantic, 1987)
- PDB with Jaco Pastorius, Kenwood Dennard (DIW, 1989)
- Way Kool (Atlantic, 1992)
- World of Collision (Big World Music, 1994)
- A-014 (Jazz a Go-go, 1996)
- Manny's Car Wash (Big World Music, 1996)
- Carrasco (Fantasy, 1997)
- Late Night Talk (Venus, 1997)
- 55 Bar Sessions with Haru Takauchi, Leni Stern, Mike Stern (Paddle Wheel, 1998)
- Guitar Man (JVC, 2000)
- Color Me (JVC, 2001)
- Try Livin' It (ESC, 2003)
- Jam Jam/The Heavy Cats (& Forest Music, 2004)
- Too Funky 2 Ignore (BHM, 2005)
- Plays the Music of Jimi Hendrix with WDR Big Band (BHM, 2005)

=== As sideman ===
With Carla Bley

- Heavy Heart (WATT/ECM, 1984)
- Night-glo (WATT/ECM, 1985)
- Sextet (WATT 1987)

With Brecker Brothers

- Don't Stop the Music (Arista, 1977)
- Detente (Arista, 1980)

With Bill Evans

- The Alternative Man (Blue Note, 1985)
- Big Fun (ESC, 2002)
- Soul Bop Band Live (BHM, 2005)

With Gil Evans

- Live at Sweet Basil (Gramavision, 1986)
- 75th Birthday Concert (BBC, 2001)

With Roberta Flack

- Roberta Flack (Atlantic, 1978)
- Roberta Flack Featuring Donny Hathaway (Atlantic, 1979)
- Roberta (Atlantic, 1994)

With Michael Franks

- Passionfruit (Warner Bros., 1983)
- Skin Dive (Warner Bros., 1985)
- The Camera Never Lies (Warner Bros., 1987)

With Bob James

- Touchdown (Tappan Zee/Columbia, 1978)
- Lucky Seven (Tappan Zee/Columbia, 1979)
- H (Tappan Zee, 1980)
- Joined at the Hip (Evosound, 2019)

With Chaka Khan

- Naughty (Warner Bros., 1980)
- What Cha' Gonna Do for Me (Warner Bros., 1981)
- Chaka Khan (Warner Bros., 1982)

With David Matthews

- Dune (CTI, 1977)
- Digital Love (Electric Bird, 1979)
- Guitars On Fire! (Bandai, 1996)

With Marcus Miller

- The Sun Don't Lie (Dreyfus, 1993)
- Tales (Dreyfus, 1995)
- M² (Telarc, 2001)

With Idris Muhammad

- Turn This Mutha Out (Kudu, 1977)
- You Ain't No Friend of Mine! (Fantasy, 1978)
- Boogie to the Top (Kudu, 1978)
- Foxhuntin (Fantasy, 1979)
- My Turn (Lipstick, 1991)

With Jaco Pastorius

- Live in New York City Vol. 1: Punk Jazz (Big World Music, 1990)
- Live in New York City Vol. 2: Trio (Big World Music, 1991)
- Live in New York City Vol. 3: Promise Land (Big World Music, 1991)
- Trio 2 Live in New York City Vol. 4 (Big World Music, 1992)
- Jaco Pastorius in New York (Jazz Door 1993)
- Live in New York City Vol. 6: Punk Jazz 2 (Big World Music, 1998)
- Live in New York City Vol. 7: History (Big World Music, 1998)

With David Sanborn

- Sanborn (Warner Bros., 1976)
- Promise Me the Moon (Warner Bros., 1977)
- Heart to Heart (Warner Bros., 1978)
- Hideaway (Warner Bros., 1980)
- Voyeur (Warner Bros., 1981)
- Backstreet (Warner Bros., 1983)
- Straight to the Heart (Warner Bros., 1984)
- A Change of Heart (Warner Bros., 1987)
- Close-Up (Reprise, 1988)
- Upfront (Elektra, 1992)

With Spyro Gyra

- Carnaval (Amherst, 1980)
- Catching the Sun (MCA, 1980)
- City Kids (MCA, 1983)
- Incognito (MCA, 1982)

With Lew Soloff

- Hanalei Bay (Bellaphon, 1985)
- Rainbow Mountain (Enja, 1999)

With Bonnie Tyler

- Faster Than the Speed of Night (CBS, 1983)
- Holding Out for a Hero (CBS/Sony, 1984)
- Secret Dreams and Forbidden Fire (CBS, 1986)

With others

- Joan Armatrading, Me Myself I (A&M, 1980)
- Burt Bacharach, Futures (A&M, 1977)
- Ray Barretto, Can You Feel It (Atlantic, 1978)
- Wilbur Bascomb, And Future Dreams (H&L, 1977)
- John Blair, We Belong Together (CTI, 1977)
- Alex Blake, Especially for You (Denon, 1979)
- Blues Brothers, The Blues Brothers (Atlantic, 1980)
- Randy Brecker, Hangin' in the City (ESC, 2001)
- Jonatha Brooke, The Works (C.A.R.E., 2009)
- Irene Cara, Anyone Can See (Epic, 1982)
- Terri Lyne Carrington, Real Life Story (Verve Forecast 1989)
- Felix Cavaliere, Castles in the Air (Epic, 1979)
- Linda Clifford, I'll Keep On Loving You (Capitol, 1982)
- Freddy Cole, Love Makes the Changes (Fantasy, 1998)
- Hank Crawford, Cajun Sunrise (Kudu, 1978)
- Kenwood Dennard, Just Advance (Big World Music, 1992)
- Ronnie Dyson, If the Shoe Fits (Columbia, 1979)
- Art Farmer, Something You Got (CTI, 1977)
- Lisa Fischer, So Intense (Elektra, 1991)
- Al Foster, Mr. Foster (Better Days, 1979)
- Mike Gibbs, Nonsequence (Provocateur, 2001)
- Dizzy Gillespie, Closer to the Source (Atlantic, 1984)
- Bunky Green, Visions (Vanguard, 1978)
- Don Grolnick, Hearts and Numbers (Hip Pocket, 1985)
- Chris Hinze, Word Sound and Power (CBS, 1980)
- Chris Hinze, Chelsea Bridge (Keytone, 1987)
- Adam Holzman, Overdrive (Lipstick, 1994)
- Phyllis Hyman, Phyllis Hyman (Buddah, 1977)
- Chuck Jackson & Cissy Houston, I'll Take Care of You (Shanachie, 1992)
- Al Jarreau, L Is for Lover (Warner Bros., 1986)
- Billy Joel, The Stranger (Columbia, 1977)
- Earl Klugh, Crazy for You (Liberty, 1981)
- Wayne Krantz, Signals (Enja, 1990)
- Stacy Lattisaw, Young and in Love (Cotillion, 1979)
- Hubert Laws, Say It with Silence (CBS, 1978)
- Will Lee, Oh! (Go Jazz, 1994)
- Kenny Loggins, Celebrate Me Home (Columbia, 1977)
- Kenny Loggins, Leap of Faith (Columbia, 1991)
- Darlene Love, Paint Another Picture (CBS, 1988)
- Karen Mantler, Karen Mantler's Pet Project (Virgin, 2000)
- Manzanita, Echando Sentencias (RCA 1986)
- Jackie McLean, Monuments (RCA 1979)
- Frankie Miller, Dancing in the Rain (Mercury, 1986)
- Monkey Business, Kiss Me On My Ego (Columbia, 2005)
- Airto Moreira, Killer Bees (B&W Music, 1993)
- Meli'sa Morgan, Still in Love with You (Pendulum, 1992)
- Tyka Nelson, Royal Blue (Chrysalis, 1988)
- Eddie Palmieri, Lucumi Macumba Voodoo (Epic, 1978)
- Les Paul, American Made World Played (Capitol, 2005)
- Noel Pointer, Feel It (Soul Music.com 1979)
- Wolfgang Puschnig, Pieces of the Dream (Amadeo 1988)
- Lou Rawls, Shades of Blue (Philadelphia International 1980)
- Nicole Renee, Nicole Renee (Atlantic, 1998)
- Nicki Richards, Naked to the World (Atlantic, 1991)
- Philippe Saisse, Storyteller (Philips, 1991)
- John Scofield, Blue Matter (Gramavision, 1987)
- Paul Shaffer, Coast to Coast (Capitol, 1989)
- Marlena Shaw, Take a Bite (Columbia, 1979)
- Michael Shrieve, Transfer Station Blue (Fortuna, 1984)
- Janis Siegel, At Home (Atlantic, 1987)
- Paul Simon, One-Trick Pony (Warner Bros., 1980)
- Alan Sorrenti, L.A. & N.Y. (Cool Sound, 2001)
- Source, Source (P-Vine, 1997)
- Candi Staton, Chance (Warner Bros., 1979)
- Steely Dan, Gaucho (MCA, 1980)
- Jeremy Steig, Firefly (CTI, 1977)
- Steps Ahead, Magnetic (Elektra, 1986)
- Leni Stern, The Next Day (Passport, 1987)
- Mike Stern, Neesh (Kenwood, 1983)
- Sting, ...Nothing Like the Sun (A&M, 1987)
- Steve Swallow, Carla (XtraWATT, 1987)
- Steve Swallow, Swallow (XtraWATT, 1992)
- Taj Mahal, Like Never Before (Private Music, 1991)
- Tasha Thomas, Midnight Rendezvous (SoulMusic, 2015)
- Narada Michael Walden, I Cry I Smile (Atlantic, 1977)
- Narada Michael Walden, Awakening (Atlantic, 1979)
- Grover Washington Jr., Breath of Heaven (Columbia, 1997)
- James D-Train Williams, Miracles of the Heart (Funkytowngrooves/Sony 2011)
- Bernie Worrell & Jesse Rae, Worae (Luzuli Music, 2017)
