= Don Grolnick =

American jazz musician (1947–1996)

Background information
- Born: September 23, 1947; Brooklyn, New York
- Died: June 1, 1996 (aged 48) Manhattan, New York
- Genres: Jazz; Latin; pop; R&B
- Occupations: Musician; Songwriter; Music Director; Record Producer
- Instrument: Piano
- Years active: 1971–1996
- Formerly of: Dreams; Steps Ahead

Don Grolnick (September 23, 1947 – June 1, 1996) was an American jazz pianist, composer, and record producer. He was a member of the groups Steps Ahead and Dreams, both with Michael Brecker, and played often with the Brecker Brothers. As a session musician, he recorded with John Scofield, Billy Cobham, Roberta Flack, Harry Chapin, Dave Holland, Chuck Mangione, Bette Midler, Marcus Miller, Bob Mintzer, Linda Ronstadt, David Sanborn, Carly Simon, Barry Manilow, JD Souther, Steely Dan, and James Taylor.

== Career ==
Grolnick was born in Brooklyn and grew up in Levittown, New York, the only child of Muriel Grolnick (1927–1997) and Lester Grolnick (1922–2009). Grolnick was Jewish. He began his musical life on accordion but later switched to piano. His interest in jazz began as a child when his father took him to a Count Basie concert, and soon after they also saw Erroll Garner perform at Carnegie Hall.

He attended Tufts University and majored in philosophy. After leaving Tufts, Grolnick formed the jazz-rock band Fire & Ice with Ken Melville on guitar and Stuart Schulman, his friend since childhood, on bass guitar. They were the opening act for B.B. King, The Jeff Beck Group, and the Velvet Underground at Boston clubs such as the Boston Tea Party and The Ark. This was Grolnick's first foray into rock and blues as a performer, and he began to write within the medium as well.

Grolnick moved back to New York in 1969 and joined Melville in the jazz fusion band "D". He toured with Linda Ronstadt in 1977 and again in 1984 when she was performing American standards with Nelson Riddle and his orchestra.

In their liner notes for the 1999 reissue of The Royal Scam, Donald Fagen and Walter Becker state "...Don Grolnick keyboard vamps so solid you could set your watch by them."

Grolnick died at the age of 48 on June 1, 1996 from Non-Hodgkin lymphoma. His cremated remains are interred in the columbarium at Fort Hill Cemetery in Montauk, New York.

== Discography ==
=== As leader/co-leader ===
Year recorded	Title	Label	Personnel/Notes
1985	Hearts and Numbers	Windham Hill	With Michael Brecker (tenor sax), Jeff Mironov, Hiram Bullock and Bob Mann (guitar), Will Lee, Marcus Miller and Tom Kennedy (bass), Peter Erskine and Steve Jordan (drums)
1990	Weaver of Dreams	Blue Note	Septet, with Randy Brecker, Michael Brecker, Bob Mintzer, Dave Holland, Peter Erskine, Barry Rogers
1992	Nighttown	Blue Note	With Randy Brecker (trumpet), Steve Turre (trombone), Joe Lovano (tenor sax), Marty Ehrlich (bass clarinet), Dave Holland (bass), Bill Stewart (drums)
1995?	Medianoche	Warner Bros.	With Michael Brecker (tenor sax), Dave Valentin (flute), Mike Mainieri (vibes), Andy Gonzalez (bass), Don Alias, Steve Berrios and Milton Cardona (percussion)
1995	London Concert	Fuzzy Music	With Randy Brecker (trumpet), Robin Eubanks (trombone), Marty Ehrlich (alto sax, bass clarinet), Michael Brecker (tenor sax), Peter Washington (bass), Peter Erskine (drums), Don Alias (percussion); in concert
1997	Don Grolnick - The complete Blue Note Recordings	Blue Note	With Randy Brecker, Michael Brecker, Joe Lovano, Bob Mintzer, Dave Holland, Peter Erskine, Bill Stewart and others

With Brecker Brothers

- 1975 The Brecker Bros.
- 1976 Back to Back
- 1977 Don't Stop the Music
- 1980 Detente

With Dreams

- 1971 Imagine My Surprise

With Steps Ahead

- 1982 Smokin' in the Pit

=== As sideman ===
With Gato Barbieri

- 1976 Caliente!
- 1978 Ruby, Ruby
- 1988 Passion and Fire

With Joe Beck

- 1975 Beck (Kudu)

With George Benson

- 1975 Good King Bad (CTI)
- 1976 Benson & Farrell with Joe Farrell (CTI)

With Ron Carter

- 1975 Anything Goes (Kudu)
- 1976 Yellow & Green (CTI)
- 1982 El Noche Sol

With Peter Erskine

- 1982 Peter Erskine
- 1986 Transition

With Steve Khan

- 1977 Tightrope
- 1978 The Blue Man
- 1979 Arrows

With Melissa Manchester

- 1974 Bright Eyes
- 1977 Singin'...

With The Manhattan Transfer

- 1975 The Manhattan Transfer
- 1977 Pastiche

With Bob Mintzer

- 1982 Source
- 1983 Papa Lips
- 1985 Incredible Journey
- 1988 Spectrum
- 1989 Urban Contours

With Esther Phillips

- 1975 Esther Phillips and Joe Beck
- 1975 What a Diff'rence a Day Makes
- 1976 Capricorn Princess
- 1976 For All We Know

With Bonnie Raitt

- 1974 Streetlights
- 1979 The Glow

With Linda Ronstadt

- 1977 Simple Dreams
- 1978 Living in the USA
- 1982 Get Closer
- 1983 What's New
- 1984 Lush Life
- 1986 For Sentimental Reasons
- 1989 Cry Like a Rainstorm, Howl Like the Wind

With David Sanborn

- 1975 Beck & Sanborn
- 1975 Taking Off
- 1978 Heart to Heart
- 1979 Hideaway
- 1984 Straight to the Heart
- 1987 A Change of Heart
- 1988 Love Songs

With John Scofield

- 1986 Still Warm
- 1988 Flat Out

With Don Sebesky

- 1976 The Rape of El Morro
- 1980 Sebesky Fantasy

With Carly Simon

- 1978 Boys in the Trees
- 1979 Spy
- 1980 Come Upstairs
- 1983 Hello Big Man

With Steely Dan

- 1976 The Royal Scam
- 1977 Aja
- 1980 Gaucho

With James Taylor

- 1974 Walking Man
- 1979 Flag
- 1981 Dad Loves His Work
- 1985 That's Why I'm Here
- 1988 Never Die Young
- 1991 New Moon Shine
- 1993 Live

With John Tropea

- 1975 Tropea
- 1977 Short Trip to Space
- 1979 To Touch You Again
- 1991 NYC Cats Direct

With others

- 1973 Bette Midler, Bette Midler
- 1974 A Beautiful Thing, Cleo Laine
- 1974 Barry Manilow II, Barry Manilow
- 1974 The Chicago Theme, Hubert Laws
- 1975 Mark Murphy Sings, Mark Murphy
- 1976 Second Childhood, Phoebe Snow
- 1976 Main Squeeze, Chuck Mangione
- 1976 Speak No Evil, Buddy Rich
- 1976 The Main Attraction, Grant Green
- 1977 Blue Lights in the Basement, Roberta Flack
- 1977 In My Stride, David Ruffin
- 1977 Inner Conflicts, Billy Cobham
- 1977 Libby Titus, Libby Titus
- 1977 Love Play, Mike Mainieri
- 1977 Ringo the 4th, Ringo Starr
- 1977 Ghost Writer, Garland Jeffreys
- 1979 Yama, Art Farmer
- 1979 You're Only Lonely, JD Souther
- 1979 The Cat and the Hat, Ben Sidran
- 1980 Dreamers Matinee, Don Schlitz
- 1980 Middle Man, Boz Scaggs
- 1980 Naughty, Chaka Khan
- 1980 One Bad Habit, Michael Franks
- 1980 One-Trick Pony, Paul Simon
- 1980 Red Cab to Manhattan, Stephen Bishop
- 1980 Whirlwind, Andrew Gold
- 1981 Wanderlust, Mike Mainieri
- 1981 Heavy Metal: Music from the Motion Picture [uncredited]
- 1982 Anyone Can See, Irene Cara
- 1983 Mobo Vols. 1 & 2, Kazumi Watanabe
- 1987 Short Stories, Bob Berg
- 1988 Don't Try This at Home, Michael Brecker
- 1988 Tears of Joy, Tuck & Patti
- 1988 Time in Place, Mike Stern
- 1990 Now You See It... (Now You Don't), Michael Brecker (Grolnick as producer & composer)
- 1991 Warm Your Heart, Aaron Neville
