= Love Songs (David Sanborn album) =

Compilation album by David Sanborn
- Released: November 14, 1995
- Genre: Smooth jazz
- Length: 51:45
- Label: Warner Bros.
- Producer: Peter Asher, Ray Bardani, Michael Colina, Don Grolnick, Tommy LiPuma, Robert Margouleff, Matt Pierson, and Phil Ramone

David Sanborn chronology
Hearsay (1994)	Love Songs (1995)	Pearls (1995)

Professional ratings
Review scores
Source	Rating
AllMusic	3/5 stars

Love Songs is a compilation album of romantic songs by American alto saxophonist David Sanborn and was released in 1995 through Warner Bros. Records. The album peaked at No. 11 on December 2, 1995 on Billboard's Contemporary Jazz Albums chart.

This album sampler includes romantic tracks from albums released in 1976-1988 such as "Lisa", "Straight to the Heart", and the 1985 version of "The Water Is Wide" with vocalist Linda Ronstadt.

== Track listing ==
All tracks are written by David Sanborn, unless otherwise noted.

No.	Title	Writer(s)	Length
1.	"All I Need Is You"	Marcus Miller	3:39
2.	"Straight to the Heart"	Marcus Miller	3:20
3.	"One in a Million"		3:39
4.	"It's You"		5:13
5.	"The Seduction"	Giorgio Moroder	3:50
6.	"Imogene"	Marcus Miller	5:20
7.	"You Don't Know Me"	Eddy Arnold; Cindy Walker	5:35
8.	"You Are Everything"	Thom Bell; Linda Creed	3:45
9.	"I Do It for Your Love"	Paul Simon	2:44
10.	"When You Smile at Me"		5:42
11.	"Lisa"		4:27
12.	"The Water Is Wide" (with Linda Ronstadt)	Traditional	4:31
Total length:			51:45
