= Taking Off (David Sanborn album) =

Studio album by David Sanborn
- Released: 1975
- Studios: A&R Recording (New York City, New York)
- Genres: Smooth jazz, jazz-funk
- Length: 36:43
- Label: Warner Bros.
- Producer: John Court

David Sanborn chronology
Taking Off (1975)	Beck & Sanborn (1975)

Professional ratings
Review scores
Source	Rating
Allmusic	4.5/5 stars

Taking Off is a studio album by David Sanborn, released in 1975 on Warner Bros. Records. The album reached number 19 on Billboard's Jazz Albums chart.

== Track listing ==
All tracks composed by David Matthews except where noted.

1. "Butterfat" (Steve Khan) – 3:02
2. "'Way 'Cross Georgia" (Coleridge-Taylor Perkinson) – 4:27
3. "Duck Ankles" (Steve Khan) – 3:20
4. "Funky Banana" – 3:16
5. "The Whisperer" (Don Grolnick) – 4:47
6. "It Took a Long Time" (Randy Brecker) – 3:29
7. "Black Light" – 6:30
8. "Blue Night" – 3:45
9. "Flight" – 4:07

== Personnel ==
Musicians

- David Sanborn – alto saxophone
- Don Grolnick – acoustic piano, clavinet, Fender Rhodes, synthesizers, arrangements (5)
- Steve Khan – electric guitar, acoustic guitar, 12-string electric guitar
- Joe Beck – electric guitar (4)
- Buzz Feiten – electric guitar (4)
- Will Lee – bass guitar
- Chris Parker – drums (1–6)
- Rick Marotta – additional drums (1, 3)
- Steve Gadd – drums (7–9)
- Ralph MacDonald – bongos, percussion, congas (7–9)
- José Madera – percussion (7–9)
- Warren Smith – percussion (7–9)
- Howard Johnson – baritone saxophone, tuba, arrangements (2)
- Michael Brecker – tenor saxophone
- Tom Malone – trombone
- Randy Brecker – trumpet, arrangements (6)
- John Clark – French horn (2)
- Peter Gordon – French horn (2)
- David Matthews – arrangements (1, 3–5, 7–9)

Strings (7–9)

- Charles McCracken – cello
- George Ricci – cello
- Lucien Schmit – cello
- John Beal – double bass
- Bob Daugherty – double bass
- Al Brown – viola
- Harold Coletta – viola
- Manny Vardi – viola
- Emile Charlap – violin, string contractor
- Harry Clickman – violin
- Lou Eley – violin
- Paul Gershman – violin
- Harry Glickman – violin
- Leo Kahn – violin
- Harold Kohon – violin
- Charles Libove – violin
- Guy Lumia – violin
- David Nadien – violin, concertmaster
- Gene Orloff – violin
- Max Pollikoff – violin
- Matthew Raimondi – violin

Production

- John Court – producer
- Don Hahn – engineer, remixing (1–4, 6–9)
- Lee Herschberg – remixing (5)
- Sam Ginsberg – assistant engineer
- Ed Thrasher – art direction
- Robert Lockhart – design
- Benno Friedman – photography
