= Love Remembers (album) =

Studio album by George Benson
- Released: June 8, 1993
- Genre: Jazz
- Length: 60:26
- Label: Warner Bros.
- Producers: George Benson; David Gamson; Jimmy George; Gary Henry; Bob James; Stewart Levine; Charlie Wallert

George Benson chronology
| Big Boss Band (1990) | Love Remembers (1993) | That's Right (1996) |

Singles from That's Right
- 1. "Love of My Life" Released: 1993; 2. "I'll Be Good to You" Released: 1993

Love Remembers is the 28th album by George Benson, released June 8, 1993. This album charted at No. 1 on Billboard's Contemporary Jazz Albums chart, as well as No. 7 on its Jazz Albums chart.

== Critical reception ==
Professional ratings
Review scores
| Source | Rating |
|---|---|
| AllMusic | 3/5 stars |

Thom Jurek of AllMusic concludes his review with, "Love Remembers is certainly a solid high mark for Benson in the '90s, and anyone interested in Benson's brand of pop will be delighted with it."

== Track listing ==
| No. | Title | Writer(s) | Length |
|---|---|---|---|
| 1. | "I'll Be Good To You" | Brian McKnight; David Gamson; Melvin Ragin | 5:03 |
| 2. | "Got To Be There" | Elliot Willensky | 4:47 |
| 3. | "My Heart Is Dancing" | Omar Hakim | 5:10 |
| 4. | "Love Of My Life" | Jimmy George; James Auspitz | 4:09 |
| 5. | "Kiss and Make Up" | Jimmy George; James Auspitz | 4:01 |
| 6. | "Come Into My World" | George Benson; Derrick Givens; Steven Benson Hue | 4:46 |
| 7. | "Love Remembers" | Jeanne Ricks | 5:40 |
| 8. | "Willing To Fight" | Kirk Whalum | 6:19 |
| 9. | "Somewhere Island" | Michael Bearden | 5:37 |
| 10. | "Lovin' On Borrowed Time" | Jimmy George; John F. Hammond | 4:09 |
| 11. | "Lost in Love" | Ronnie Foster | 5:05 |
| 12. | "Calling You" | Bob Telson | 5:40 |
| Total length: | | | 60:26 |

Track information and credits adapted from the album's liner notes.

== Personnel ==
Musicians

- George Benson – vocals (1, 2, 7), guitar (2–12), lead vocals (4, 10, 12), backing vocals (6)
- William Bryant – Fender Rhodes (1)
- David Gamson – keyboard programming (1), drum programming (1)
- Melvin Lee Davis – synthesizers (2)
- Gary Henry – keyboards (2, 6), drum programming and sequencing (2, 6), string synthesizer (8)
- Bob James – acoustic piano (3, 7, 8)
- Richard Tee – electric piano (3, 7, 9)
- Max Risenhoover – synthesizer programming (3, 7–9), drum programming (5), synth percussion (7)
- Joseph Joubert – keyboards (4)
- David Whitham – acoustic piano (4)
- Ronnie Foster – keyboards (5, 11)
- Michael Colina – additional synthesizer programming (5), bass (5)
- Steven Benson Hue – electric piano, (6), drum programming and sequencing (6)
- Michael Bearden – acoustic piano (9)
- Jimmy George – synthesizers (10)
- John F. Hammond – keyboards (10)
- Randy Waldman – acoustic piano (10), strings (10), keyboards (11)
- Aaron Zigman – keyboards (12)
- Erik Hanson – synthesizer programming (12)
- Wah Wah Watson – guitar (1)
- Jeff Mironov – rhythm guitar (5, 7, 8)
- Pat Kelley – rhythm guitar (10)
- Phil Upchurch – rhythm guitar (11)
- Michael Landau – guitar (12)
- Abraham Laboriel – bass (1)
- Freddie Washington – bass (3, 9)
- Nathan East – bass (4, 7, 11)
- Will Lee – bass (8)
- Larry Kimpel – bass (10)
- John Patitucci – bass (12)
- Leon "Ndugu" Chancler – drums (1)
- Omar Hakim – drums (3, 7–9)
- Harvey Mason – drums (4)
- John Robinson – drums (10)
- Steve Ferrone – drums (11)
- Sunny Delight – rhythm programming (12)
- Bill Summers – percussion (1)
- Paulinho da Costa – percussion (5, 11)
- Leonard Gibbs – percussion (8, 9)
- Hubert Laws – flute (3, 9)
- Kirk Whalum – saxophone (3, 7, 9), tenor saxophone (8)
- Roger Byam – saxophone (4)
- Randy Brecker – flugelhorn (3)
- Chuck Findley – trumpet (12)
- Brian McKnight – backing vocals (1)
- Angela Clemmons-Patrick – backing vocals (5)
- Dennis Collins – backing vocals (5)
- Sharon Jerry-Collins – backing vocals (5)
- Darryl Tookes – backing vocals (5)
- Gwen Guthrie – lead vocals (6)
- Sharon Bryant – backing vocals (7)
- Lisa Fischer – backing vocals (7)
- Hilary James – backing vocals (7)
- Jeanne Ricks – backing vocals (7)
- Vaneese Thomas – backing vocals (7)
- Olivia McClurkin – backing vocals (10)
- Alfie Silas – backing vocals (10)
- Rose Stone – backing vocals (10)
- Gerry Knight – backing vocals (12)

Music arrangements

- Gary Henry – arrangements (2, 6)
- Joseph Joubert – rhythm arrangements (4)
- Claude Gaudette – string arrangements (4)
- Bruce Frazier – string conductor (4)
- Ray Bardani – additional arrangements (7)
- Michael Colina – additional arrangements (7)
- Kirk Whalum – arrangements (8)
- Michael Bearden – arrangements (9)
- Jimmy George – arrangements (10)
- John F. Hammond – arrangements (10)
- Stewart Levine – arrangements (12)

== Production ==
- Leonard Richardson – executive producer
- George Benson – executive producer, producer (2, 4–6, 10, 11)
- David Gamson – producer (1)
- Gary Henry – producer (2, 6)
- Bob James – producer (3, 7–9)
- Charlie Wallert – producer (4, 5, 11)
- Jimmy George – producer (10)
- Stewart Levine – producer (12)
- Laura Harding – music contractor
- Lee Holdridge – music contractor
- Roger Laroque – music contractor
- Joe Soldo – music contractor
- Lyn Weiss – music contractor
- Robbie C. Benson – production assistant
- Kathleen Fegan – production coordinator
- Julie Larson – production coordinator
- Marion Orr – production coordinator
- Lu Snead-Crowe – production coordinator
- Garrett White – production coordinator
- Michon C. Stanco – package coordinator
- Christine Cano – art direction, design
- Just Loomis – photography
- Ken Fritz and Pam Byers for Ken Fritz Management – management

Technical

- Bernie Grundman – mastering at Bernie Grundman Mastering (Hollywood, California)
- David Gamson – engineer (1)
- Stephen Stewart-Short – engineer (1)
- Goh Hotoda – mixing (1)
- Kendal Stubbs – engineer (2, 6)
- Gary Henry – mixing (2, 6)
- Bob Rosa – mixing (2, 6)
- Bill Schnee – mixing (3–5, 10), engineer (4, 5, 10, 11)
- Al Schmitt – engineer (3, 7–9)
- Elliot Scheiner – mixing (8, 9)
- Jimmy George – engineer (10)
- Gary Chester – mixing (11)
- Daren Klein – engineer (12), mixing (12)
- Matthew Lamonica – additional engineer (3, 7–9)
- Ray Bardani – additional recording (5), remix engineer (7), additional remixing (7)
- Michael Colina – additional remixing (7)
- David Hecht – assistant engineer (1)
- Jennifer Bette – assistant mix engineer (2, 6)
- Todd Whitelock – assistant engineer (3, 7–9)
- Victor Deyglio – assistant additional engineer (3, 7–9)
- Todd Childress – assistant engineer (5), assistant remix engineer (7)
- Dann Wojnar – assistant mix engineer (8, 9)
- John Hendrickson – assistant engineer (10)
- Tim Lauber – assistant engineer (11)
- Chris Rich – assistant engineer (11)
- Yvonne Yedibalian – assistant mix engineer (11)

== Charts ==
| Chart (1993) | Peak position |
|---|---|
| Australian Albums (ARIA) | 114 |
| US Top Contemporary Jazz Albums (Billboard) | 1 |
| US Top Jazz Albums (Billboard) | 7 |
| US Top R&B/Hip-Hop Albums (Billboard) | 50 |
