= Beck (album) =

Studio album by Joe Beck
- Released: 1975
- Recorded: March 10, 11 & 17, 1975
- Studios: Van Gelder Studio, Englewood Cliffs, NJ
- Genre: Jazz
- Length: 35:55
- Labels: Kudu; KUDU-21
- Producer: Creed Taylor

Joe Beck chronology
Beck & Sanborn (1975)	Beck (1975)	Watch the Time (1973)

Beck is an album by guitarist Joe Beck which was recorded at Rudy Van Gelder's Studio in New Jersey in 1975 and released on the CTI label. The album was reissued in 1979 and 1987 as Beck & Sanborn.

== Reception ==
Professional ratings
Review scores
Source	Rating
Allmusic	4.5/5 stars

Allmusic reviewer Thom Jurek states "Beck is essential listening for anyone interested in mid-'70s commercial jazz. The chops are there, but far more than that, Beck leads a band into a soul-deep blowing session with killer charts, nasty tunes, and killer vibes".

== Track listing ==
All compositions by Joe Beck except where noted

1. "Star Fire" – 4:31
2. "Cactus" (Don Grolnick) – 4:55
3. "Texas Ann" – 7:53
4. "Red Eye" – 7:10
5. "Cafe Black Rose" (Gene Dinwiddie) – 4:23
6. "Brothers and Others" – 6:23

== Personnel ==
- Joe Beck – guitar
- David Sanborn – alto saxophone
- Don Grolnick – piano, electric piano, organ
- Steve Khan – rhythm guitar
- Will Lee – electric bass
- Chris Parker – drums
- Ray Mantilla – percussion
- Don Sebesky – arranger
- Charles Libove, David Nadien, Frederick Buldrini, Harold Kohon, Harry Cykman, Harry Lookofsky, Joe Malin, Max Ellen, Peter Dimitriades – violin
- Charles McCracken, George Ricci, Jesse Levy – cello
