= Upfront (David Sanborn album) =

Studio album by David Sanborn
- Released: 1992
- Genre: Jazz, jazz fusion
- Label: Elektra
- Producer: Marcus Miller

David Sanborn chronology
Another Hand (1991)	Upfront (1992)	Hearsay (1994)

Professional ratings
Review scores
Source	Rating
The Penguin Guide to Jazz Recordings	3.5/4 stars

Upfront is the sixteenth album recorded by jazz musician David Sanborn, released in 1992. This album focused on other soloists, instead of Sanborn's alto saxophone being the primary instrument. Some key musicians on this album include guitarists Eric Clapton, Cornell Dupree and Hiram Bullock, tenor saxophonist John Purcell, bassist/keyboardist Marcus Miller, percussionist Don Alias and drummer Steve Jordan.

== Track listing ==
No.	Title	Writer(s)	Length
1.	"Snakes"	Marcus Miller	7:03
2.	"Benny"	Miller	5:46
3.	"Crossfire"	Miller, David Sanborn	5:35
4.	"Full House"	Miller, Sanborn	6:54
5.	"Soul Serenade"	King Curtis, Luther Dixon	4:12
6.	"Hey"	Stephen Jordan, Miller, Ricky Peterson, Sanborn, William S. Patterson	8:27
7.	"Bang Bang"	Joe Cuba, Jimmy Sabater	4:37
8.	"Alcazar"	Miller, Sanborn	7:29
9.	"Ramblin'"	Ornette Coleman	8:01
Total length:			58:09

== Personnel and recording ==
- David Sanborn – alto saxophone, sopranino saxophone (1, 8)
- Marcus Miller – keyboards (1–4, 6, 8), lead guitar (1), bass guitar, bass clarinet (1, 3, 4, 6, 8), horn arrangements (2–4, 6), acoustic guitar (8), arrangements (8)
- Ricky Peterson – Hammond B3 organ (1–4, 6, 8, 9), acoustic piano (7)
- Jason Miles – synthesizer sound programming (1–3, 6, 8)
- Richard Tee – Hammond B3 organ (5)
- William "Spaceman" Patterson – rhythm guitar (1, 3, 4), wah-wah guitar (6), guitars (7–9)
- Chris Bruce – lead guitar (3), rhythm guitar (4), guitar fills (4)
- Hiram Bullock – additional guitar (3)
- Eric Clapton – guitar solo (4)
- Cornell Dupree – guitars (5)
- Steve Jordan – drums (1–6, 8, 9), rhythm guitar (6), timbales (7)
- Don Alias – percussion (1, 3, 6–8), congas (4)
- Naná Vasconcelos – additional percussion (8)
- John Purcell – saxello (1, 8), alto flute (2), tenor saxophone (3, 4, 6)
- Lenny Pickett – horn arrangements (3), tenor saxophone (7)
- Crispin Cioe – baritone saxophone (5)
- Arno Hecht – tenor saxophone (5)
- Stan Harrison – alto saxophone (7)
- Dave Bargeron – trombone (2, 4, 6, 7), tuba (2)
- Bob Funk – trombone (5)
- Art Baron – trombone (7)
- Randy Brecker – trumpet (3, 4, 6)
- "Hollywood" Paul Litteral – trumpet (5)
- Laurie Frink – trumpet (7)
- Earl Gardner – trumpet (7)
- Herb Robertson – trumpet (9)
- Uptown Horns – horn arrangements (5)

Vocals on "Bang Bang"

- Chris Albert
- Don Alias
- Becky Anderson
- Susan Brown-Silag
- Barry Campbell
- Manny Castillo
- Robin Downes
- Steve Ferrone
- Ava Gardner
- Bibi Green
- Steve Jordan
- Tommy LiPuma
- Marcus Miller
- William "Spaceman" Patterson
- David Sanborn
- Rikke Sanborn
- Michelle Sescher

Production

- Marcus Miller – producer
- Joe Ferla – recording, mixing
- Chris Albert – assistant engineer
- Shannon Carr – assistant engineer
- Michael White – assistant engineer
- Bob Ludwig – mastering
- Artie Smith – drum technician
- John Purcell – saxophone sound consultant
- Bibi Green – production coordinator
- Stephen Byram – artwork, design
- Lynn Goldsmith – cover portrait photography
- Robert Lewis – photography

Studios

- Recorded at Electric Lady Studios and The Power Station (New York, New York); Camel Studio (New Jersey).
- Mixed at Electric Lady Studios
- Mastered at Masterdisk (New York, New York).
