= Another Hand =

Studio album by David Sanborn
- Released: 1991
- Studio: Master Sound (Astoria, New York); The Power Station and Electric Lady (New York City, New York)
- Genre: Jazz
- Length: 58:43
- Label: Elektra Musician
- Producer: Marcus Miller; Hal Willner

David Sanborn chronology
Close-Up (1988)	Another Hand (1991)	Upfront (1992)

Another Hand is an album by the American saxophonist David Sanborn, released in 1991.

Another Hand peaked at No. 170 on the Billboard 200. The album and the title track were nominated for Grammy Awards, in the "Best Jazz Instrumental Performance, Group" and "Best Jazz Instrumental Solo" categories.

== Production ==
The album was produced by Hal Willner and Marcus Miller. The guitarists Marc Ribot and Bill Frisell, the drummer Jack DeJohnette, and the pianist Mulgrew Miller were among the many musicians who contributed to the album. Syd Straw provided vocals on the cover version of the Velvet Underground's "Jesus".

== Critical reception ==
Professional ratings
Review scores
Source	Rating
AllMusic	4/5 stars
Calgary Herald	C−
The Encyclopedia of Popular Music	4/5 stars
Entertainment Weekly	B
MusicHound R&B: The Essential Album Guide	4/5 stars
The Rolling Stone Album Guide	4/5 stars

Entertainment Weekly deemed the album "the first Sanborn record to extend beyond his ever-popular R&B-fusion style and really suggest his broad tastes." The Wall Street Journal thought that Bill Frisell's "moody, rubbery guitar sets the tone for a project that permits Sanborn to stretch beyond the saccharine jazz-pop for which he is adored."

The Washington Post wrote: "Often vilified for his fashionable fusion and general sense of accommodation, Sanborn surprised his severest critics with the cinematic sweep of this straight-ahead jazz and blues-inflected album." The Calgary Herald opined that "the kind of icy jazz noodling that David Sanborn favors sets a mind wanderin' to more interesting places." The Indianapolis Star noted that "some of the music cultivates a 'sound' more intently than it explores the individualism of the players, but this will keep the pop contingent of Sanborn's fans happy."

AllMusic wrote that "there's nothing shallow or contrived about the album, an exploratory, heartfelt effort generally defined by his introspective, soulsearching improvisations."

== Track listing ==
No.	Title	Writer(s)	Length
1.	"First Song"	Charlie Haden	5:23
2.	"Monica Jane"	Bill Frisell	5:30
3.	"Come to Me, Nina"	Terry Adams	5:28
4.	"Hobbies"	Adams	4:59
5.	"Another Hand"	Marcus Miller	6:45
6.	"Jesus"	Lou Reed	3:35
7.	"Weird from One Step Beyond"	Harry Lubin	6:14
8.	"Cee"	David Sanborn, Adams	2:26
9.	"Medley: Prayers for Charlie from The Devil at Four O'Clock /The Lonely from The Twilight Zone"	Bernard Herrmann, George Duning	12:21
10.	"Dukes & Counts"	Miller	5:32

== Personnel ==
- David Sanborn – alto saxophone
- Leon Pendarvis – organ (2)
- Terry Adams – acoustic piano (3, 4, 7, 8)
- Mulgrew Miller – acoustic piano (5, 10)
- Bill Frisell – guitars (1, 2, 7), acoustic guitar (6), electric guitar (9)
- Marc Ribot – guitars (3, 7, 8), electric guitar (6), acoustic guitar (9)
- Al Anderson – guitars (4)
- Dave Tronzo – acoustic guitar (6), guitars (7, 8)
- Charlie Haden – bass (1, 2, 6, 9)
- Greg Cohen – bass (3, 4, 7, 8), arco bass (9), arrangements (9)
- Marcus Miller – bass guitar (5, 10)
- Joey Baron – drums (1–3, 6–9)
- Steve Jordan – drums (4)
- Jack DeJohnette – drums (5, 10)
- Don Alias – percussion (2–4, 6–9)
- Lenny Pickett – tenor saxophone (2), horn arrangements (2), contrabass clarinet (9), E flat clarinet (9)
- Art Baron – trombone (2, 9), bass trombone (9)
- Syd Straw – vocals (4, 6)

Production

- Hal Willner – producer (1–4, 6–9)
- Marcus Miller – producer (5, 10)
- Joe Ferla – recording, mixing
- Shannon Carr – assistant engineer
- Aaron Krops – assistant engineer
- David Merrill – assistant engineer
- David Parla – assistant engineer
- Gary Solomon – assistant engineer
- Michael White – assistant engineer
- Bob Ludwig – mastering at Masterdisk (New York, NY)
- Susan Jacobs – production coordinator
- John Purcell – saxophone sound consultant
- Stephen Byram – art direction, design, cover artwork
- Roy Volkmann – photography
