= Straight to the Heart (David Sanborn album) =

Live album by David Sanborn
- Released: October 2, 1984
- Recorded: 1984
- Studio: Le Mobile and Amigo Studios (Los Angeles, California); A&R Recording, S.I.R. Studios and Greene St. Recording (New York City, New York)
- Genre: Jazz fusion, smooth jazz
- Length: 51:01
- Label: Warner Bros.
- Producer: Marcus Miller

David Sanborn chronology
Backstreet (1983)	Straight to the Heart (1984)	A Change of Heart (1987)

Professional ratings
Review scores
Source	Rating
AllMusic	4/5 stars
The Penguin Guide to Jazz Recordings	3/4 stars

Straight to the Heart is a 1984 album by David Sanborn. It was recorded before a live studio audience and had performances of songs recorded on previous David Sanborn albums. The recording won the 1986 Grammy Award for Best Jazz Fusion Performance.

== Reception ==
The AllMusic review by Scott Yanow stated: "With bassist Marcus Miller acting as producer and some memorable tunes being performed (most notably 'Hideaway' and 'Straight to the Heart'), this is one of altoist David Sanborn's better R&B-ish recordings. Joined by keyboardist Don Grolnick, guitarist Hiram Bullock, bassist Miller, drummer Buddy Williams and various guest musicians, Sanborn sounds fairly inspired and is in top form."

== Track listing ==
1. "Hideaway" (Sanborn) – 6:37
2. "Straight to the Heart" (Marcus Miller) (live version) – 4:57
3. "Run for Cover" (Marcus Miller) – 6:28
4. "Smile" (Coleridge Taylor Perkinson) – 10:25
5. "Lisa" (Sanborn) (live version) – 5:05
6. "Love & Happiness" (Al Green, Mabon "Teenie" Hodges) (live version) – 6:32
7. "Lotus Blossom" (Don Grolnick) (live version) – 6:50
8. "One Hundred Ways" (Tony Coleman, Kathy Wakefield, Benjamin Wright) – 4:07

== Personnel ==
- David Sanborn – alto saxophone
- Don Grolnick – keyboards
- Marcus Miller – synthesizers, bass guitar, backing vocals
- Hiram Bullock – guitars, backing vocals
- Buddy Williams – drums
- Ralph MacDonald – percussion (3, 5, 8)
- Errol "Crusher" Bennett – percussion (2)
- Michael White – percussion (6)
- Hamish Stuart – lead vocals (6)
- Michael Brecker – tenor saxophone (8)
- Randy Brecker – trumpet (8)
- Jon Faddis – trumpet (8)
- Vivian Cherry – backing vocals (8)
- Frank Floyd – backing vocals (8)
- Lani Groves – backing vocals (8)

Production

- Russ Titelman – executive producer
- Marcus Miller – producer
- Elliot Scheiner – recording, mixing
- Paul Brown – additional engineer
- Guy Charbonneau – additional engineer
- Marti Robertson – additional engineer
- Jerry Solomon – additional engineer
- Joe Arnold – second engineer
- Cliff Bonnell – second engineer
- Erika Klein – second engineer
- Stanley Wallace – second engineer
- George Marino – mastering at Sterling Sound (New York, NY)
- Gary Gellar – live recording coordinator
- Mary Melia – production assistant
- Shirley Klein – album coordinator
- Laura LiPuma – art direction, design
- Toshi Kazama – photography
- Patrick Rains & Associates – management
