= A Change of Heart (album) =

Studio album by David Sanborn
- Released: 1987
- Studio: RPM Sound Studios, Power Station, Right Track Recording, Sound Ideas Studios, Unique Recording Studios, Blue Book Studios, Flying Monkey Productions (all in New York City, New York); Bossa Nova Hotel, Yamaha Research and Development Studios, Schnee Studios (All in Los Angeles, California).
- Genre: Smooth jazz
- Length: 41:06
- Label: Warner Bros.
- Producer: Marcus Miller; Michael Colina; Philippe Saisse; Ronnie Foster

David Sanborn chronology
| Double Vision (1986) | A Change of Heart (1987) | Close-Up (1988) |

Professional ratings
Review scores
| Source | Rating |
|---|---|
| The Penguin Guide to Jazz Recordings | 2/4 stars |

A Change of Heart is a studio album by David Sanborn, released in 1987 through the record label Warner Bros. The album reached number 74 on the Billboard 200, number 43 on Billboard's R&B Albums chart and number 3 on the Top Contemporary Jazz Albums chart.

== Track listing ==
| No. | Title | Writer(s) | Length |
|---|---|---|---|
| 1. | "Chicago Song" | Marcus Miller | 6:26 |
| 2. | "Imogene" | Miller | 5:26 |
| 3. | "High Roller" | Michael Colina, David Sanborn | 4:39 |
| 4. | "Tintin" | Philippe Saisse | 4:05 |
| 5. | "Breaking Point" | Colina, Sanborn | 4:26 |
| 6. | "A Change of Heart" | Colina, Sanborn | 5:07 |
| 7. | "Summer" | Ronnie Foster | 5:45 |
| 8. | "The Dream" | Michael Sembello | 4:58 |

== Personnel ==
Musicians

- David Sanborn – alto saxophone
- Marcus Miller – keyboards (1, 2), rhythm guitar (1), bass (1–3, 5, 6), synthesizer arrangements (2)
- Jason Miles – synthesizer programming (1, 2)
- Bernard Wright – additional synthesizers (1)
- Don Grolnick – electric piano (2)
- Rob Mounsey – additional synthesizers (2), synthesizer arrangements (2)
- Michael Colina – synthesizers (3, 5, 6), programming (3, 5, 6), arrangements (3, 5, 6)
- John Mahoney – Synclavier (3, 5, 6)
- Mac Rebennack – acoustic piano (3)
- Philippe Saisse – keyboards (4), synthesizers (4), programming (4), synth guitar lead (4), arrangements (4)
- Ronnie Foster – synthesizers (7), programming (7), arrangements (7)
- Michael Sembello – synthesizers (8), programming (8), arrangements (8), backing vocals (8)
- Randy Waldman – additional keyboards (8)
- Casey Young – Synclavier programming (8)
- Hiram Bullock – lead guitar (1, 7), rhythm guitar (5), electric guitar solo (5)
- Hugh McCracken – rhythm guitar (3), slide guitar solo (3)
- Nick Moroch – electric guitar (4, 6), guitar solo (4)
- Carlos Rios – electric guitar (7), acoustic guitar (7)
- Anthony Jackson – contrabass guitar (4)
- Steve Ferrone – drums (1)
- Steve Gadd – drums (2)
- Mino Cinelu – electronic drum fills (3, 5), percussion (3, 5, 6)
- Mickey Curry – drums (4)
- John Robinson – drums (7)
- Paulinho da Costa – percussion (7)
- Michael Brecker – EWI controller (6)
- Mark Stevens – backing vocals (1)

Production

- Michael Colina – executive producer, producer (3, 5, 6, 8)
- Marcus Miller – producer (1, 2), engineer (2)
- Philippe Saisse – producer (4)
- Ronnie Foster – producer (7)
- Michael Hutchinson – engineer (1)
- Marti Robertson – engineer (1, 2)
- Eric Calvi – engineer (3–7)
- Billy C. Haarbauer – MIDI engineer (4)
- Keith Seppanen – engineer (7)
- Hilary Bercovici – engineer (8)
- Paul Hamingson – assistant engineer
- Acar Key – assistant engineer
- Mike Krowiak – assistant engineer
- Jeff Lippay – assistant engineer
- Moira Marquis – assistant engineer
- Gary Rindfuss – assistant engineer
- Bud Rizzo – assistant engineer
- Mario Rodriguez – assistant engineer
- Dary Sulich – assistant engineer
- Josh Abbey – mixing (1–3, 5, 7, 8)
- The French Acrobats – mixing (4)
- Larry Alexander – mixing (6)
- George Marino – mastering at Sterling Sound (New York City, New York)
- Bibi Green – production coordinator
- Shirley Klein – album coordinator
- Michael Hodgson – art direction, design
- Ann Field – illustration
- Guido Harari – photography
