= As We Speak =

Studio album by David Sanborn
- Released: 1982
- Recorded: 1982
- Studio: Warner Bros. Recording Studios (North Hollywood, California); Record Plant (Los Angeles, California); George Massenburg Studio (Santa Monica, California); Mediasound Studios and Soundworks (New York City, New York)
- Genre: Smooth jazz
- Length: 39:39
- Label: Warner Bros.
- Producer: Robert Margouleff

David Sanborn chronology
Voyeur (1981)	As We Speak (1982)	Backstreet (1983)

Professional ratings
Review scores
Source	Rating
AllMusic	4/5 stars
The Rolling Stone Jazz Record Guide	3/5 stars

As We Speak is a studio album by David Sanborn, released in 1982 on Warner Bros. Records.

The album reached No. 70 on the Billboard 200, number 32 on Billboard's R&B Albums chart and number 1 on Billboard's Jazz Albums chart.

== Track listing ==
Side 1
No.	Title	Writer(s)	Length
1.	"Port of Call"	Michael Sembello, Dan Sembello	4:29
2.	"Better Believe It"	Marcus Miller	3:31
3.	"Rush Hour"	Miller	4:43
4.	"Over and Over"	Don Freeman, Miller	4:12
5.	"Back Again"	Belfield, Freeman	3:52

Side 2
No.	Title	Writer(s)	Length
6.	"As We Speak"	Sanborn, Michael Sembello	4:17
7.	"Straight to the Heart"	Miller	3:26
8.	"Rain on Christmas"	Sanborn	4:47
9.	"Love Will Come Someday"	Michael Sembello, David Batteau	6:17

== Personnel ==
- David Sanborn – alto saxophone (1, 4, 5, 7, 8), saxophone section (1, 4), soprano saxophone (2, 3, 6, 9)
- Don Freeman – keyboards, synthesizers (2, 7, 8)
- Michael Sembello – guitars, lead vocals (5, 9), backing vocals (5)
- Marcus Miller – bass guitar, synthesizers (4)
- Omar Hakim – drums, tambourine (4)
- Paulinho da Costa – percussion

Additional musicians

- George Duke – clavinet (1)
- Lance Ong – synthesizers (2, 8)
- James Skelton – Hammond B3 organ (4)
- Spike – synthesizers (5), IRT strings (5, 6, 8, 9)
- Buzz Feiten – rhythm guitar (1)
- Malando Gassama – percussion (5)
- Bob Mintzer – bass clarinet (1)
- Bill Evans – saxophone (4), saxophone section (4)
- Robert A. Martin – French horn (9)
- Cruz Baca Sembello – backing vocals (5, 9)

Production

- Robert Margouleff – producer
- Howard Siegel – engineer, mixing
- Rudy Hill – assistant engineer
- Gregg Mann – assistant engineer
- Mike Morongell – assistant engineer
- Wayne Yurglin – assistant engineer
- Barbara Rooney – assistant engineer
- Karat Faye – second mix engineer
- Stephen Marcussen – mastering at Precision Lacquer (Hollywood, California)
- Ilyce Weiner – production coordinator
- Christine Sauers – art direction, design
- Richard Seireeni – art direction
- Kohei Onashi – illustration
- Michael Halsband – photography

== Charts ==
Year	Chart	Position
1982	Billboard 200	70
1982	Billboard Top Black Albums	32
1982	Billboard Jazz Albums	1
