= David Sanborn =

American saxophonist (1945–2024)

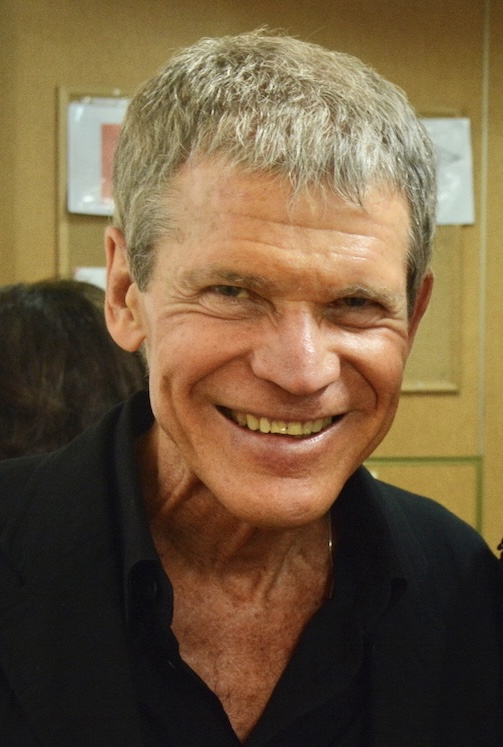
- Sanborn in 2015

Background information
- Born: David William Sanborn; July 30, 1945; Tampa, Florida, U.S.
- Died: May 12, 2024 (aged 78) Tarrytown, New York, U.S.
- Genres: Jazz; jazz fusion; blues; blues rock; R&B; pop
- Occupation: Musician
- Instruments: Alto saxophone; soprano saxophone; keyboards; piano
- Years active: 1959–2024
- Labels: Verve; GRP; Rhino; Elektra; Warner Bros.; Reprise
- Website: davidsanborn.com

David William Sanborn (July 30, 1945 – May 12, 2024) was an American alto saxophonist. He worked in many musical genres; his solo recordings typically blended jazz with instrumental pop and R&B. He began playing the saxophone at the age of 11 and released his first solo album, Taking Off, in 1975. He was active as a session musician and played on numerous albums by artists including Stevie Wonder, Bruce Springsteen, Aretha Franklin, Sting, the Eagles, Rickie Lee Jones, James Brown, George Benson, Carly Simon, Elton John, Bryan Ferry, Ween, and The Rolling Stones. Sanborn released more than 20 albums and won six Grammy awards.

In 2012, Sanborn was described by critic Scott Yanow as "the most influential saxophonist on pop, R&B and crossover players of the past 20 years." He became identified with radio-friendly smooth jazz, although he disliked the term and said he was not a jazz musician.

== Early life ==
Sanborn was born in 1945 in Tampa, Florida, where his father was stationed in the US Air Force. David grew up in Kirkwood, Missouri, a western suburb of St Louis. He contracted polio at the age of three. He "accepted his fate stoically" and endured a "miserable childhood". He was confined to an iron lung for a year, and polio left him with impaired respiration and a left arm shorter than the right.

While confined to bed, Sanborn was inspired by the "raw rock 'n' roll energy" of music he heard on the radio, particularly saxophone breaks in songs such as Fats Domino's "Ain't That a Shame" and Little Richard's "Tutti Frutti". He loved the sound of the saxophone and at the age of eleven was happy to change to saxophone from piano lessons when doctors recommended that he take up a wind instrument to improve his breathing and strengthen his chest muscles. When he was 14, he was competent enough playing saxophone to play with blues musicians in local clubs. Alto saxophonist Hank Crawford, who was a member of Ray Charles's band at the time, was an early and lasting influence on Sanborn.

Sanborn attended college at Northwestern University in Evanston, Illinois, directly north of Chicago and studied music. He transferred to the University of Iowa where he played and studied with saxophonist J. R. Monterose.

== Career ==
Sanborn performed with blues musicians Albert King and Little Milton at the age of 14. In 1967 he took a Greyhound bus to San Francisco to join the "Summer of Love". While visiting recording studios he was invited to sit in on a session with The Paul Butterfield Blues Band. He made such an impression that he joined the band for five years. He recorded on four Butterfield albums as a horn section member and a soloist from 1967 to 1971. Early in the morning on August 18, 1969, he appeared with the band at the Woodstock Music Festival in Bethel, New York.

In 1972, Sanborn played on the track "Tuesday Heartbreak" on the Stevie Wonder album Talking Book. In 1975 he worked with David Bowie on Young Americans and on the James Taylor recording of "How Sweet It Is (To Be Loved by You)" on the album Gorilla. Sanborn is featured on Linda Ronstadt's 1978 album Living in the USA, playing solos on "Ooh Baby Baby" and "Alison."

In the mid-1970s, Sanborn became active in the popular jazz fusion scene by joining the Brecker Brothers band, where he became influenced by Michael Brecker. While with the Brecker brothers, he recorded his first solo album, Taking Off, which became a jazz/funk classic. In 1985, Sanborn and Al Jarreau played two sold-out concerts at Chastain Park in Atlanta. Although Sanborn was most associated with smooth jazz, he studied free jazz in his youth with saxophonists Roscoe Mitchell and Julius Hemphill. In 1993, he revisited this genre when he appeared on Tim Berne's Diminutive Mysteries, which was dedicated to Hemphill, who was Berne's mentor. Sanborn's album Another Hand featured avant-garde musicians.

He found life on the road increasingly difficult but continued to tour. In 2017, despite plans to reduce his workload to no more than 150 gigs a year, he embarked on a tour which included Istanbul and Nairobi, Kenya.

=== Recordings ===
Sanborn was a highly regarded session player from the late 1960s onward and played with an array of well-known artists, including James Brown, Phil Woods, Bryan Ferry, Michael Stanley, Eric Clapton, Bobby Charles, Cat Stevens, Roger Daltrey, Stevie Wonder, Paul Simon, Jaco Pastorius, the Brecker Brothers, Michael Franks, Kenny Loggins, Casiopea, Players Association, David Bowie, Todd Rundgren, Bruce Springsteen, Little Feat, Tommy Bolin, Bob James, James Taylor, Al Jarreau, Pure Prairie League, Kenny G, Loudon Wainwright III, George Benson, Joe Beck, Donny Hathaway, Elton John, Gil Evans, Carly Simon, Guru, Linda Ronstadt, Billy Joel, Kenny Garrett, Roger Waters, Steely Dan, Ween, the Eagles, Grateful Dead, Nena, Hikaru Utada, The Rolling Stones, Ian Hunter, and Toto.

Many of Sanborn's solo recordings were collaborations with bassist/multi-instrumentalist/composer and producer Marcus Miller, whom he met in the Saturday Night Live band in the late 1970s. Sanborn performed with Clapton on film soundtracks such as Lethal Weapon (and its sequels) and Scrooged. In 1991, Sanborn recorded Another Hand, which the All Music Guide to Jazz described as a "return by Sanborn to his real, true love: unadorned (or only partly adorned) jazz" that "balanced the scales" against his smooth jazz material. The album, produced by Hal Willner, featured musicians from outside the smooth jazz scene like Terry Adams, Charlie Haden, Jack DeJohnette, Bill Frisell, and Marc Ribot.

In 1994, Sanborn appeared in A Celebration: The Music of Pete Townshend and The Who, also known as Daltrey Sings Townshend, a two-night concert at Carnegie Hall produced by Roger Daltrey of English rock band The Who in celebration of his fiftieth birthday. In 1994 a CD and a VHS video were issued, and in 1998 a DVD was released. In 1995 Sanborn performed in The Wizard of Oz in Concert: Dreams Come True, a musical performance at Lincoln Center to benefit the Children's Defense Fund. The performance was broadcast on Turner Network Television (TNT) and released on CD and video in 1996.

In 2006, he featured in Gordon Goodwin's Big Phat Band's album The Phat Pack on the track "Play That Funky Music", a remake of the Wild Cherry hit in a big band style. Sanborn often performed at Japan's Blue Note venues in Nagoya, Osaka, and Tokyo. Sanborn played on the song "Your Party" on Ween's 2007 release La Cucaracha. On April 8, 2007, he sat in with the Allman Brothers Band during their annual run at the Beacon Theatre in Manhattan, New York. In 2010, Sanborn toured with a trio featuring jazz organist Joey DeFrancesco and Steve Gadd. They played the combination of blues and jazz from his album Only Everything. In 2011, Sanborn toured with keyboardist George Duke and bassist Marcus Miller as the group DMS. In 2013, Sanborn toured with keyboardist Brian Culbertson on "The Dream Tour" celebrating the 25th anniversary of the song "The Dream".

Besides playing alto saxophone as his main instrument, Sanborn also played baritone, soprano and sopranino saxophones; flute; and keyboards/piano on some recordings.

=== Broadcasting ===
Sanborn performed and hosted radio, television, and web programs. He was a member of the Saturday Night Live band in 1980. Beginning in the late 1980s he was a regular guest member of Paul Shaffer's band on Late Night with David Letterman. He also appeared on the Late Show with David Letterman a few times in the 1990s.

From 1988 to 1989, Sanborn co-hosted Night Music, a late-night music show on television with Jools Holland. Using producer Hal Willner's eclectic approach, the show positioned Sanborn with many famed musicians including Miles Davis, Dizzy Gillespie, Pharoah Sanders, NRBQ, Eric Clapton, Robert Cray, Lou Reed, Elliott Sharp, Jean-Luc Ponty, Santana, Todd Rundgren, Youssou N'dour, Pere Ubu, Loudon Wainwright III, Mary Margaret O'Hara, Screamin' Jay Hawkins, Leonard Cohen, Sonic Youth, Was (Not Was), Anson Funderburgh, Warren Zevon, John Zorn, Curtis Mayfield, Richard Thompson, and Jo-El Sonnier.

During the 1980s and 1990s, Sanborn hosted a syndicated radio program, The Jazz Show with David Sanborn. He recorded many shows' theme songs, as well as several other songs for The Late Late Show with Tom Snyder. In 2021, as the coronavirus pandemic paused live music performances in public venues, Sanborn hosted a series of master classes on Zoom and also virtual productions of "Sanborn Sessions" with artists such as Marcus Miller, Christian McBride, Sting, Michael McDonald, which involved live performances and interviews from his home in Westchester, New York.

== Equipment ==
Sanborn played a Selmer Mark VI alto saxophone. In the early 1980s he was endorsed by Yamaha and he played their saxophones on the albums As We Speak and Backstreet. He can be seen playing a Yamaha saxophone at the Montreux Jazz Festival in 1981.

According to an April 1988 interview in the jazz magazine DownBeat, he had a preference for Selmer Mark VI alto saxophones in the 140,000-150,000 serial number range, all produced in 1967. This range of the Selmer Mark VI preferred by Sanborn have the "medium bow" which are known for its great pitch and response.

In the late 1960s to mid 1970s, Sanborn played a Brilhart Level-Air stainless steel mouthpiece created by Arnold Brilhart visible in footage from his performance in 1969 at Woodstock with the Paul Butterfield Blues Band, and on photographs accompanying his solo albums Taking Off (1975) and Heart to Heart (1978). From the late 1970s, Sanborn played with mouthpieces created by Bobby Dukoff. In 2014 he switched from the Dukoff to a mouthpiece designed by Aaron Drake.

== Personal life ==
Sanborn was married to his fourth wife, French-born Alice Soyer Sanborn, a pianist, vocalist, and composer. His first three marriages ended in divorce. He had one son, Jonathan, a bass player and two granddaughters.

Sanborn died of complications from prostate cancer in Tarrytown, New York on May 12, 2024, at the age of 78. He was diagnosed with the disease in 2018.

On November 25, 2024, a David Sanborn Tribute Concert was held at Sony Hall in New York City. The concert was live-streamed by WBGO and hosted by Marcus Miller and Pat Prescott, and featured performances by Eric Marienthal, Bob James, Paul Shaffer, Will Lee, Kurt Elling, Randy Brecker, Alex Han and Dave Koz.

== Awards and honors ==
Sanborn's first Grammy Award was for Best R&B Instrumental Performance for the single "All I Need is You". Sanborn won six Grammy Awards and had eight gold albums and one platinum album. He won Grammy Awards for Voyeur (1981), Double Vision (1986), and the instrumental album Close Up (1988).

In 2004, Sanborn was inducted into the St. Louis Walk of Fame.

David Sanborn in concert

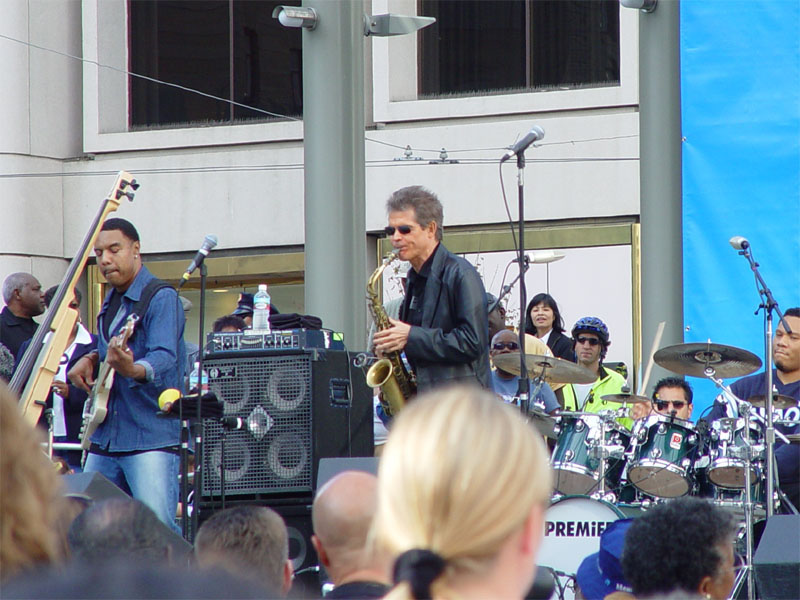
Union Square, San Francisco, 2003

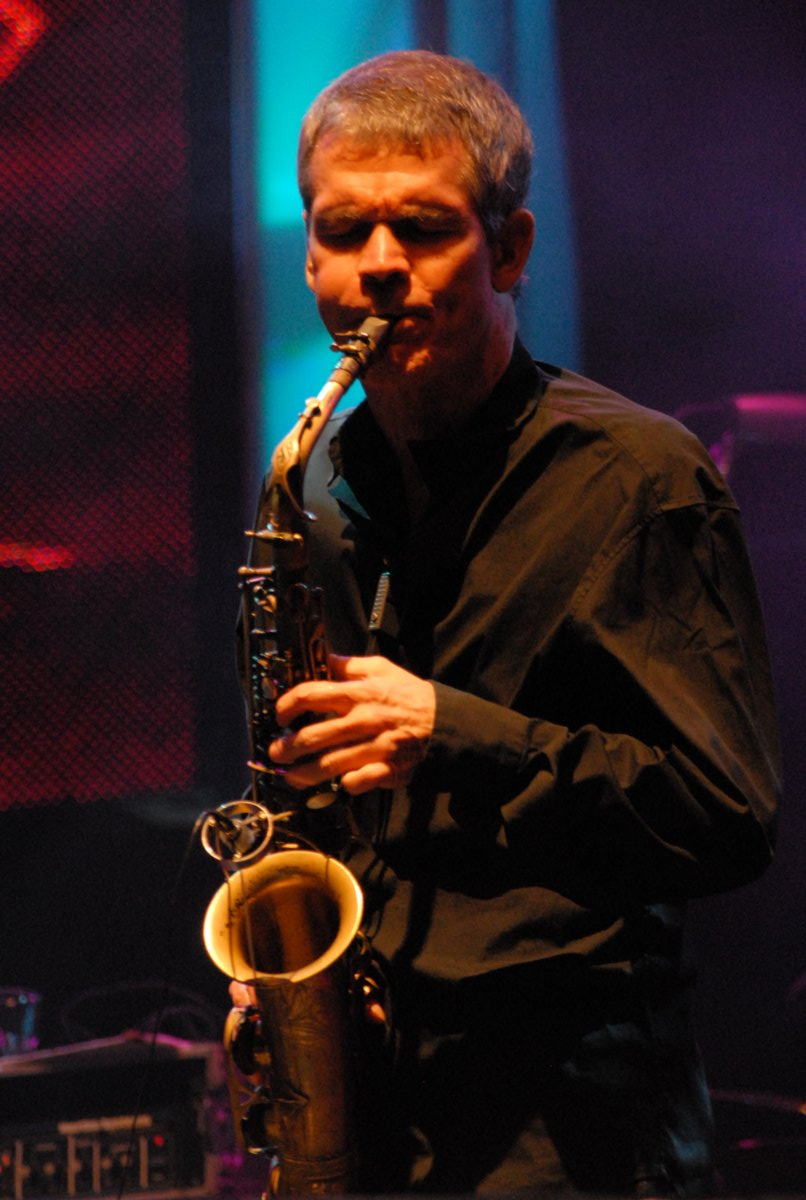
Riviera Maya Jazz Festival in Playa del Carmen, Mexico, 2008

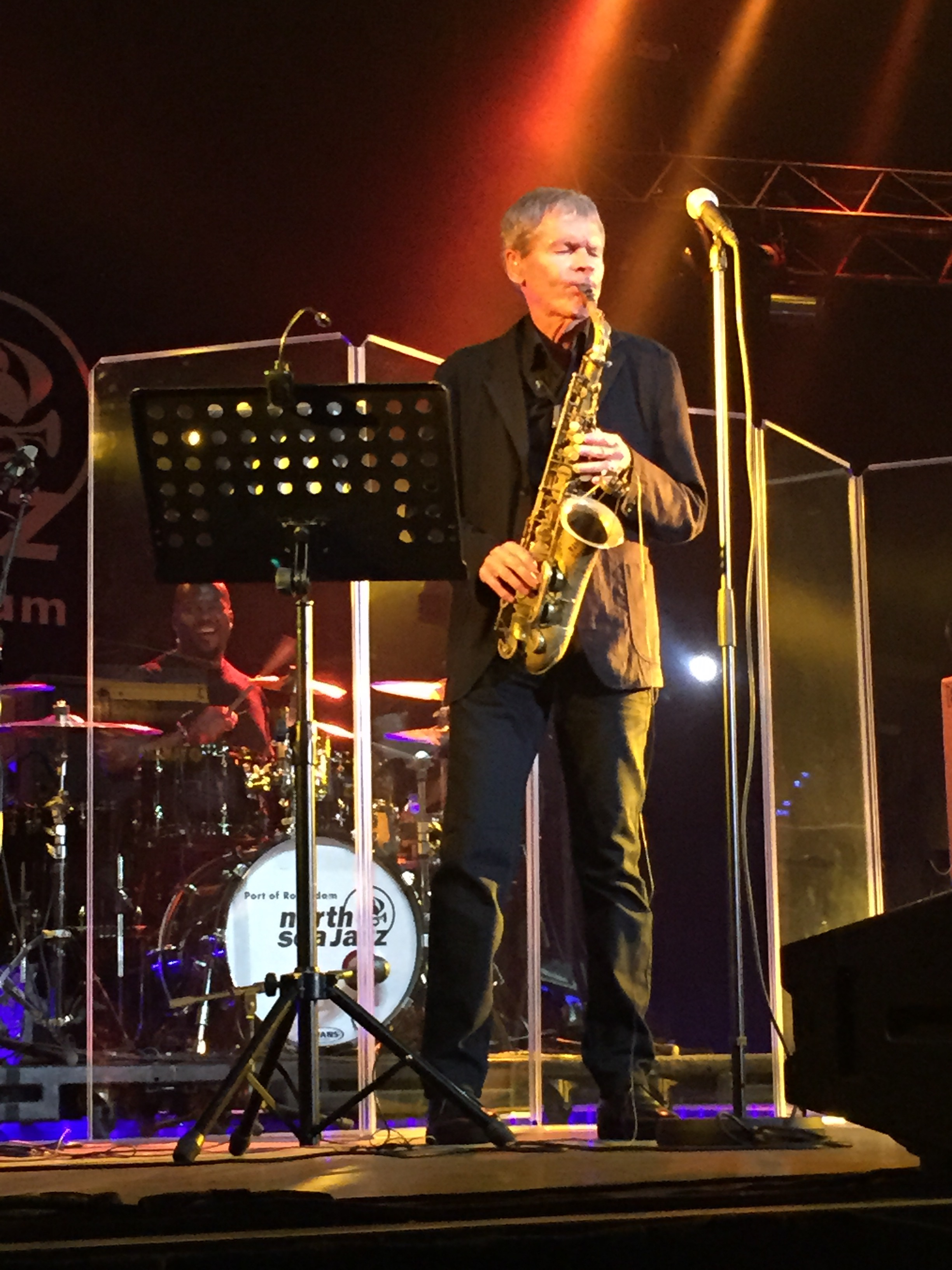
North Sea Jazz Festival in Rotterdam, 2015

== Discography ==
=== As leader ===
- Taking Off (Warner Bros., 1975)
- David Sanborn (Warner Bros., 1976)
- Promise Me the Moon (Warner Bros., 1977)
- Heart to Heart (Warner Bros., 1978)
- Hideaway (Warner Bros., 1979 [1980]) – No. 2 jazz hit; No. 33 R&B hit
- Voyeur (Warner Bros., 1981) – No. 1 jazz hit
- As We Speak (Warner Bros., 1982) – No. 1 jazz hit
- Backstreet (Warner Bros., 1983) – No. 1 jazz hit
- Straight to the Heart (Warner Bros., 1984) – live; No. 1 jazz hit
- Double Vision with Bob James (Warner Bros., 1986) – No. 1 jazz hit; No. 16 R&B hit
- A Change of Heart (Warner Bros., 1987)
- Close-Up (Reprise, 1988)
- Another Hand (Elektra Musician, 1991)
- Upfront (Elektra, 1992)
- Hearsay (Elektra, 1994)
- Pearls (Elektra, 1995)
- Songs from the Night Before (Elektra, 1996)
- Inside (Elektra, 1999)
- Time Again (Verve, 2003)
- Closer (Verve, 2005)
- Here and Gone (Decca, 2008)
- Only Everything (Decca, 2010)
- Quartette Humaine with Bob James (Okeh, 2013)
- Time and the River (Okeh, 2015)

Compilations

- The Best of David Sanborn (Warner Bros., 1994)
- Love Songs (Warner Bros., 1995)
- Dreaming Girl (WEA, 2008)
- Then Again: The Anthology (Rhino, 2012) [2-CD]
- This Masquerade (Warner, 2018)
- Anything You Want (Cherry Red, 2020) [3-CD]

As guest

Crack The Sky, She’s A Dancer, Mind Baby-on Crack The Sky debut release 1975

- Arif Mardin, All My Friends Are Here (NuNoise, 2010) – on "So Blue"
- Anders Wihk, Same Tree Different Fruit – on ”Thank You For The Music” (Capitol Music Group AB, 2012)

=== As sideman ===
With George Benson

- 1975: Good King Bad (CTI, 1976)
- 1975 Pacific Fire (CTI, 1983)
- 1983: In Your Eyes (Warner Bros., 1983)

With James Brown

- Hell (Polydor, 1974)
- Reality (Polydor, 1974)

With the Brecker Brothers

- The Brecker Bros. (Arista, 1975)
- Back to Back (Arista, 1976)
- Return of the Brecker Brothers (GRP, 1992)

With Randy Brecker

- The Brecker Brothers Band Reunion (Piloo, 2013)
- Rocks (Piloo, 2019)

With Paul Butterfield

- The Resurrection of Pigboy Crabshaw (Elektra, 1967)
- In My Own Dream (Elektra, 1968)
- Keep on Moving (Elektra, 1969)
- Sometimes I Just Feel Like Smilin (Elektra, 1971)
- Better Days (Bearsville, 1973)
- Put It in Your Ear (Bearsville, 1976)
- Live: New York, 1970 (RockBeat, 2015)[2CD] – live rec. 1970
- The Paul Butterfield Blues Band Live At Woodstock (Run Out Groove, 2020)[2LP] – live rec. 1969

With Ron Carter

- Anything Goes (Kudu, 1975)
- Yellow & Green (CTI, 1987) – in bonus tracks

With Gil Evans

- Svengali (Atlantic, 1973)
- The Gil Evans Orchestra Plays the Music of Jimi Hendrix (RCA Victor, 1974)
- Montreux Jazz Festival '74 (Philips, 1975)
- There Comes a Time (RCA, 1976)
- Gil Evans Live at the Royal Festival Hall London 1978 (RCA Victor, 1979)
- Priestess (Antilles, 1983) – live rec. 1977

With Maynard Ferguson

- Primal Scream (Columbia, 1976)
- Maynard (Columbia, 1981) – compilation
- Hollywood (Columbia, 1982)

With Michael Franks

- The Art of Tea (Warner Bros., 1976)
- Sleeping Gypsy (Warner Bros., 1977)
- Tiger in the Rain (Warner Bros., 1979)
- Objects of Desire (Warner Bros., 1982)
- Skin Dive (Warner Bros., 1985)
- Abandoned Garden (Warner Bros., 1995)

With Bob James

- Heads (Tappan Zee/Columbia, 1977)
- Touchdown (Tappan Zee/Columbia, 1978)
- Lucky Seven (Tappan Zee/Columbia, 1979)
- Foxie (Tappan Zee/Columbia, 1983)

With Al Jarreau

- Heart's Horizon (Reprise, 1988)
- Tenderness (Reprise, 1994) – live

With Steve Khan

- Tightrope (Tappan Zee/Columbia, 1977)
- The Blue Man (Columbia, 1978)
- Arrows (Columbia, 1979)

With Lisa Lauren

- What Comes Around (Planet Jazz, 1998)
- My Own Twist (Planet Jazz, 2001)
- It Is What It Is (Planet Jazz, 2004)
- Lisa Lauren Loves the Beatles (Planet Jazz, 2006)

With The Manhattan Transfer

- The Manhattan Transfer (Atlantic, 1975)
- Brasil (Atlantic, 1987) – 1 track

With Pure Prairie League

- Can't Hold Back (RCA, 1979)
- Firin' Up (Casablanca, 1980)
- Something in the Night (Casablanca, 1981)

With Kenny Loggins

- High Adventure (Columbia, 1982)
- Vox Humana (Columbia, 1985)

With Carly Simon

- Boys in the Trees (Elektra, 1978)
- Spy (Elektra, 1979)
- Torch (Warner Bros., 1981)
- Hello Big Man (Warner Bros., 1983)

With Mike Stern

- Neesh (Trio, 1985)
- Upside Downside (Atlantic, 1986)
- Give and Take (Atlantic, 1997)

With James Taylor

- Gorilla (Warner Bros., 1975)
- JT (Columbia, 1977)
- Flag (Columbia, 1979)
- That's Why I'm Here (Columbia, 1985)

With John Tropea

- Tropea (Marlin, 1975)
- To Touch You Again (Marlin, 1979)

With others

- B.B. King, Guess Who (ABC, 1972)
- Loudon Wainwright III, Album III (Columbia, 1972)
- Idris Muhammad, House of the Rising Sun (Kudu, 1972)
- Stevie Wonder, Talking Book (Tamla, 1972)
- Michael Stanley, Friends and Legends (MCA, 1973)
- Todd Rundgren, A Wizard, a True Star (Bearsville, 1973)
- O'Donel Levy, Everything I Do Gonna Be Funky (Groove Merchant, 1974)
- David Bowie, David Live (RCA, 1974)
- Joe Beck, Beck (Kudu, 1975)
- Joe Bataan, Afrofilipino (Salsoul, 1975)
- David Bowie, Young Americans (RCA, 1975) – rec. 1974–75
- Hubert Laws, The Chicago Theme (CTI, 1975)
- Tommy Bolin, Teaser (Nemperor, 1975)
- Todd Rundgren, Initiation (Bearsville, 1975)
- Michael Bolton, Michael Bolotin (RCA Victor, 1975)
- Paul Simon, Still Crazy After All These Years (Columbia, 1975)
- Cat Stevens, Numbers (Island, 1975)
- Mark Murphy, Mark Murphy Sings (Muse, 1975)
- Bruce Springsteen, Born to Run (Columbia, 1975)
- Jaco Pastorius, Jaco Pastorius (Epic, 1976) – rec. 1975
- Phoebe Snow, Second Childhood (Columbia, 1976)
- Michael Stanley, Ladies' Choice (Epic, 1976)
- Larry Coryell, Aspects (Arista, 1976)
- Ian Hunter, All American Alien Boy (Columbia, 1976)
- Elton John, Blue Moves (MCA, 1976)
- Mose Allison, Your Mind Is on Vacation (Atlantic, 1976)
- Burt Bacharach, Futures (A&M, 1977)
- Mike Mainieri, Love Play (Arista, 1977)
- Garland Jeffreys, Ghost Writer (A&M, 1977)
- Don McLean, Prime Time (Arista, 1977)
- Linda Ronstadt, Living in the USA (Asylum, 1978)
- Steve Forbert, Alive on Arrival (Nemperor, 1978)
- David Clayton-Thomas, Clayton (ABC, 1978)
- Garland Jeffreys, One-Eyed Jack (A&M, 1978)
- Chaka Khan, Chaka (Warner Bros., 1978) – rec. 1977–78
- Dr. John, City Lights (Horizon, 1978)
- Melanie, Phonogenic Not Just Another Pretty Face (MCA, 1978)
- Flora Purim, Everyday Everynight (Warner Bros., 1978)
- Tony Williams, The Joy of Flying (Columbia, 1978)
- Tim Curry, Fearless (A&M, 1979)
- John McLaughlin, Electric Dreams (Columbia, 1979) – rec. 1978
- Bonnie Raitt, The Glow (Warner Bros., 1979)
- JD Souther, You're Only Lonely (Columbia, 1979)
- Eagles, The Long Run (Asylum, 1979) – rec. 1978–79
- Steely Dan, Gaucho (MCA, 1980) – rec. 1978–80
- Aretha Franklin, Aretha (Arista, 1980)
- James Last, The Seduction (Polydor, 1980)
- Rickie Lee Jones, Pirates (Warner Bros., 1981) – rec. 1980–81
- Larry Carlton, Sleepwalk (Warner Bros., 1982)
- Garland Jeffreys, Guts for Love (Epic, 1982)
- Gloria Gaynor, Gloria Gaynor (Warner Bros., 1982)
- Randy Crawford, Windsong (Warner Bros., 1982)
- Karla Bonoff, Wild Heart of the Young (Columbia, 1982)
- Billy Joel, An Innocent Man (Columbia, 1983)
- Bob Mintzer, Papa Lips (Eastworld, 1983)
- The Rolling Stones, Undercover (Rolling Stones, 1983) – rec. 1982–83
- Earl Klugh, Wishful Thinking (EMI, 1984) – rec. 1983
- Dave Grusin, Night-Lines (GRP, 1984) – rec. 1983
- Roger Waters, The Pros and Cons of Hitch Hiking (Columbia, 1984) – rec. 1983
- John Scofield, Electric Outlet (Gramavision, 1984)
- Nena, ? (CBS, 1984) – rec. 1983
- Bryan Ferry, Boys and Girls (E.G., 1985) – 1 track
- Kazumi Watanabe, Mobo Splash (Domo, 1985)
- Harvie S, Urban Earth (Grama-Vision, 1985)
- Glenn Monroig, Glenn Monroig Con David Sanborn (Mamoku, 1985)
- Toto, Fahrenheit (Columbia, 1986)
- Hiram Bullock, From All Sides (Atlantic, 1986)
- Ronnie Cuber, Pin Point (Electric Bird, 1986)
- Patty Smyth, Never Enough (Columbia, 1987) – rec. 1986
- Mick Jagger, Primitive Cool (Columbia, 1987) – rec. 1986–87
- Janis Siegel, At Home (Atlantic, 1987)
- Hiram Bullock, Give It What U Got (Atlantic, 1987)
- Brenda Russell, Get Here (A&M, 1988) – rec. 1985–87
- Robert Cray, Don't Be Afraid of the Dark (Mercury, 1988)
- Roberta Flack, Oasis (Atlantic, 1988)
- Eric Clapton, Journeyman (Reprise, 1989)
- Shawn Colvin, Steady On (Columbia, 1989)
- Eddie Palmieri, Sueño (Intuition, 1989)
- Tim Berne, Diminutive Mysteries (JMT, 1993) – rec. 1992
- Paul Shaffer, The World's Most Dangerous Party (Capitol, 1993)
- Oleta Adams, Evolution (Fontana, 1993)
- John McLaughlin, The Promise (Verve, 1995)
- Larry Goldings, Whatever It Takes (Warner Bros., 1995)
- Candy Dulfer, Big Girl (RCA, 1996)
- Ricky Peterson, Souvenir (Windham Hill Jazz, 1999)
- Jason Miles, Celebrating the Music of Weather Report (Telarc, 2000)
- Take 6, Beautiful World (Warner Bros., 2002)
- Randy Brecker, 34th N Lex (ESC, 2003) – rec. 2002
- Chris Botti, To Love Again: The Duets (Columbia, 2005)
- Gordon Goodwin's Big Phat Band, The Phat Pack (Immergent, 2006)
- Livingston Taylor, There You Are Again (Whistling Dog Music, 2006)
- Ween, La Cucaracha (Rounder, 2007)
- Bobby Hutcherson, Enjoy the View (Blue Note, 2014)
- Jimmy Chamberlin and Frank Catalano, Bye Bye Blackbird (Ropeadope, 2016)

=== Video ===
- Love and Happiness (1986)
- The Super Session (1997) − David Sanborn & Friends
- The Super Session II (1998) − David Sanborn & Friends
- Legends: Live at Montreux 1997 (2005)
- The Legends of Jazz: Showcase (2006)
- Live at Montreux 1984 (2009)

== Filmography ==
=== Actor/Host ===
- The Wizard of Oz in Concert: Dreams Come True (1995)
  Cast member in the TV stage musical
- Scrooged (1988)
  Played a street musician
- Sunday Night (1988)
  Was the host of this music show
- Magnum P.I. (1986)
  Was guest saxophonist in the episode L.A.
- Stelle Sulla Citta (1983)

=== Himself ===
- Saturday Night Live (March 15, 1980)
- One Trick Pony (1980)
- Late Night with David Letterman / Late Show with David Letterman (occasionally, 1986–2010)
- The 1st Annual Soul Train Music Awards (1987)
- The 2nd Annual Soul Train Music Awards (1988)
- Benny Carter: Symphony in Riffs (1989)
- Michael Kamen: Concerto for Saxophone (1991)
- Celebration: The Music of Pete Townshend and The Who (1994)
- Forget Paris (1995)
- Burt Bacharach: One Amazing Night (1995)
- The Kennedy Center Honors: A Celebration of the Performing Arts (1996)
- Eric Clapton & Friends in Concert (1999)

=== Composer ===
- Moment to Moment (1975)
- Stelle Sulla Citta (1983)
- Finnegan Begin Again (1985)
- Psycho III (1986)
- Lethal Weapon 2 (1989)
- Lethal Weapon 3 (1992)
- Lethal Weapon 4 (1998)

=== Musician ===
- Saturday Night Live (1975)
- Murphy's Romance (1985)
- Psycho III (1986)
- Lethal Weapon (1987)
- Tequila Sunrise (1988)
- Lethal Weapon 2 (1989)
- Lethal Weapon 3 (1992)
- Forget Paris (1995)
- Lethal Weapon 4 (1998)
- Veselka: The Rainbow on the Corner at the Center of the World (2024)

== Videography ==
- Sanborn Sessions, official YouTube channel
