= Michael Colina =

American musician (born 1948)

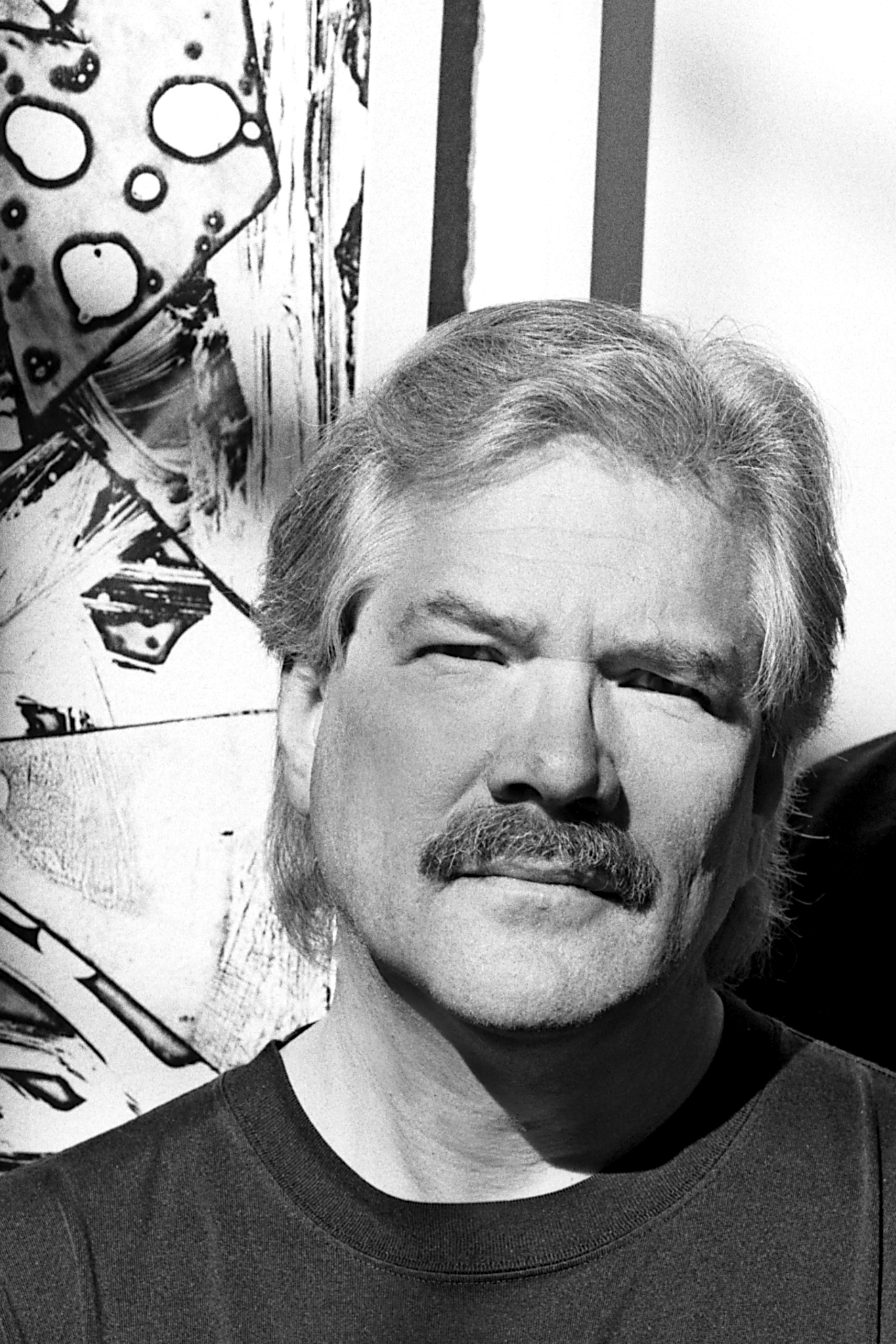
- Michael Colina

Background information
- Born: Michael Alan Colina; November 16, 1948 (age 77); Charlotte, North Carolina
- Origin: New York City
- Genres: Jazz, classical
- Occupations: Composer, producer, arranger, engineer
- Years active: 1970–present
- Labels: Warner Bros., Shanachie, Private Music
- Website: www.michaelcolina.com

Michael Dalmau Colina (born November 16, 1948) is a Grammy-winning American musician, composer, producer and engineer. He has written music for television, film, theatre, dance and live performances on concert stages throughout the United States, Europe and Japan. Colina is best known as producer and writer on recordings for musicians Bob James, David Sanborn, Michael Brecker, Marcus Miller, Bill Evans and Michael Franks. He has won three gold albums, has received four Grammy Award nominations, and won three Grammy Awards for Best Contemporary Jazz Album.

In 2006, Colina began focusing primarily on classical, jazz, and Latin music compositions—distinctive mashups that reflect his deep musical roots in his father's homeland of Cuba.

== Early life and career ==
Colina was born in Charlotte, North Carolina. He was adopted by Dr. Gilbert Dalmau Colina, a pharmacist, and Marguerite Elizabeth (Taylor) Colina. Colina's father was from Casilda, Cuba so his youth was spent traveling between the United States and Cuba where he was exposed to the sounds of classical and Latin music as well as to the Soul and Gospel music from South America .

Colina had many of his earliest works performed by the Conductor Robert Maddox with the Garinger High School Orchestra in Charlotte, North Carolina, including his first Piano Concerto that Colina premiered in 1965 at the age of 15.

Colina studied composition at the North Carolina School of the Arts with Vittorio Giannini, Louis Mennini (brother of composer Peter Mennin) and Robert Ward. He continued studies at the Chigiana in Sienna, Italy with Thomas Pasatieri and Roman Vlad, and was the first recipient of the Vittorio Giannini Memorial Scholarship award.

Upon completion of his formal education, Colina moved to New York City in 1970 to begin a career in music. His first project as an engineer was to work on The Art of the Theremin, the first official album by Clara Rockmore, produced by synthesizer icon Robert Moog, and released in 1977 by Delos International.

In 1971, choreographer Twyla Tharp asked Colina to arrange a number of British Marching Band pieces for her company.

Over a 25-year span of time, Colina has worked with a wide range of artists, including James Taylor, David Sanborn, George Benson, Michael Brecker, Linda Ronstadt, Bonnie Raitt, Bob James and Herbie Hancock.

== Classical direction ==
A 1999 trip to Cuba with his late father reawakened Colina's love for the rhythms of his childhood. After 20 years of collaborating with noted Jazz artists, Colina began writing compositions that reflect a new, classical direction—one that pulls threads from Jazz, Classical, and his Cuban-American heritage, and evident in his later compositions.

"As a deeper appreciation and integration of my Cuban heritage takes hold in my life, new elements continue to pour into my writing and find their expression in my very personal blend of music...There's already a friendly tension in play between classical and jazz music; with the addition of Latin influences, comes brightness and a joyous abandon that takes the music further in a new direction. That new direction is what you'll hear in my music."

Colina emerged onto the classical music scene in November 2006 when his composition "Nesting Dolls" was selected as a finalist by the Kremlin Chamber Orchestra for their "Homage to Mozart" composition competition and performed at Carnegie Hall.

Colina followed his Carnegie Hall debut with a flurry of new works in 2007, among them: "Shadow of Urbano," written for the Quartet San Francisco and jazz pianist Bob James; "Notturno for Violin and Piano," and "Der Golem," performed by Grammy-nominated violinist Anastasia Khitruk.

In 2008, Colina premiered The "Idoru Piano Trio," introduced to the world by the New Arts Trio at the Chautauqua Institute; "Los Caprichos," an orchestral work commissioned by the National Theater Orchestra of Brazil that premiered in Brasília and São Paulo, Brazil; his guitar concerto, "Goyescana," commissioned by, Robert Phillips and premiered by the Imperial Symphony Orchestra in Lakeland, Florida, and Baion de Bayo, commissioned by the Quintet of the Americas and that premiered in New York City.

In 2010, the Buffalo Symphony Orchestra, with JoAnn Falletta conducting, premiered Colina's "Mambosa," a Cuban Dance for Orchestra. Los Caprichos was performed again in Seoul, South Korea and in Bogota, Colombia, and had its United States premiere by Fabio Mechetti and the Jacksonville Symphony Orchestra in May 2010.

Also in 2010, Colina recorded a CD of his Violin Concerto, Three Cabinets of Wonder, the Flute Concerto, Isles of Shoals, the Guitar Concerto, "Goyescana," Los Caprichos, and the Unbearable Lightness of Being with the London Symphony Orchestra, Ira Levin and Ransom Wilson conducting.

== Discography ==
=== As producer and artist ===
- Shadow of Urbano – Private Music (1989)
- Rituals – Private Music (1991)

=== As engineer ===
- Clara Rockmore – Art of the Theremin – Delos International (1977)

=== As producer ===
- David Sanborn – Voyeur – Warner Brothers – with Ray Bardani (1981)
- Marcus Miller – Suddenly – Warner Brothers – with Ray Bardani and Marcus Miller
- Michael Franks – Objects of Desire – Warner Brothers – with Ray Bardani
- Bob James – Obsession – Warner Brothers – with Ray Bardani
- Sharon Bryant – Here I Am – Wings/Polygram – with S. Bryant and R. Galwey
- Toko Furuuchi – Strength – Sony Entertainment/Japan
- Marilyn Scott – Take Me with You – Warner Brothers – with Ray Bardani and various
- Toninho Horta – Foot on the Road – Verve Forecast – with Ray Bardani and various
- Louis Salinas – Mi Soledad – GRP – with Tommy LiPuma/Executive Producer
- Gil Parris – Gil Parris – BMG Classics
- Jaco Pastorius Tribute – Who Loves You – JVC Entertainment/Japan
- Michael Franks – Abandoned Garden – Warner Brothers – Associate Producer with Matt Pierson
- Hilary James- Behind the Mask – N2K Records – with Phil Ramone
- Portrait of Bill Evans – JVC, Japan (2002–2003)

=== As producer and writer ===
- David Sanborn – Hideaway (1979)
- David Sanborn – Backstreet – Warner Brothers – with Ray Bardani and Marcus Miller
- David Sanborn – Change of Heart – Warner Brothers – with various
- Bob James – Restless – Warner Brothers – with Ray Bardani/Writer
- Bill Evans – Push – Lipstick Records – with Various
- Andy Snitzer – Ties that Bind – Reprise Records – with various
- Hilary James and Bob James – Flesh & Blood – Warner Brothers – with Ray Bardani/Co-Producer
- Embong Rijhardo – The Embong Project – Sony Indonesia
- Bob James – Playing Hooky – Warner Brothers
- Bob James – Joy Ride – Warner Brothers – various cuts (1999)
- Walter Beasley – Won't You Let Me Love You – Shanachie Entertainment – various cuts (1999)
- Nelson Rangell – Like No Tomorrow – Shanachie Entertainment 2000 – various cuts
- Kim Waters – From The Heart – Shanachie – various cuts (2001)
- Nestor Torres – Cielo Azul- Shanachie Entertainment – various cuts (2001)
- Michael Lington – Stay With Me – Rendezvous – various cuts (2004)

=== As writer ===
- Chuck Loeb – The Music Inside – Shanachie Records

=== As arranger and musician ===
- George Benson – Love Remembers – Warner Brothers

=== As arranger ===
- Bob James and Kirk Whalum – Joined at the Hip – Warner Brothers

=== Commissions and Classical compositions ===
Canto for orchestra; Conducted by Robert Vodnoy (Premiered Siena, Italy, June 1970)

Mass for orchestra, chorus and soprano solo; Conducted by Robert Ward (Premiered 1970)

Incidental Music for "A Midsummer Night's Dream," NCSA Production, Directed by Barry Boys (1970)

"The Cave," a ballet score for orchestra (1970)

"The People," for full orchestra commissioned by Richard Kuch and the Boston Ballet (1972)

"You'll Never See Another Butterfly," a ballet score commissioned by Sophie Maslow (1972)

Incidental Music to "Anthony and Cleopatra," commissioned by New York Shakespeare Theater (1973)

Four Songs to poems of Dylan Thomas (1973)

"Notturno," a piano solo (1974)

Meditation for four cellos (1975)

"A Time of Crickets," a ballet score for Pauline Koner supported by National Endowment for the Arts and the Mary Biddle Duke Foundation (1976)

Elegy for string ensemble (1976)

"7 Days in December," for woodwind trio (1983)

Piano Concertino (2001)

• "Allegro" • "Andante con Mosso" • "Presto Scherzando"

Sestina Mutations for piano (2002)

• "Sestina Mutations" • "Dream of Peace" • "Toccata"

"Margaret's Oriental Fragments" for Soprano & Wind Quintet (2004)

• "Love's Secret" • "Spring & Fall" • "I Spoke to Thee"

"Disturbing the Silence" for string quartet recorded by the Sybarite Quintet (2005)

• "Disturbing the Silence" • "Schrodinger's Cat" • "Succubus" • "Lady of Arosa" • "Nesting Dolls," selected as a winning composition in the "Homage to Mozart" Competition and performed by the Chamber Orchestra Kremlin at Carnegie Hall's Weill Recital Hall; conducted by Mischa Rachlevsky

"Der Golum," a solo violin work written for Anastasia Khitruk (Premiered NYC, November 2007)

"Notturno for Piano and Violin," Anatasia Khitruk (violin), Felice Kuan (piano) (2007)

• "Jota De Alba" piano solo • "Sestina Movement" piano solo recorded by Pierce Emata

"Shadow of Urbano," solo piano and string quintet (Premiered by the Quartet San Francisco and pianist Bob James, November 2007)

• "Mambosa," also arranged for harp, flute and string quartet commissioned by Canta Libre Chamber Ensemble

"Habanera," trio for flute, piano and clarinet commissioned by the Palisades Virtuosi (2007)

"Baion De Bayo for Windwood Quintet," commissioned by the Quintet of the Americas (2008)

"Goyescana," a concerto for guitar and orchestra commissioned by Robert Phillips for performance with the Imperial Symphony Orchestra (2008)

"Los Caprichos," orchestral works based on the Francisco Goya prints of the same name, commissioned by the National Theatre Orchestra of Brazil and conducted by Maestro Ira Levin (2008)

• World Premier in Sao Paulo, Brazil (October 2008) • Performed in Seoul, South Korea (November 2009) • U.S. Premier with the Jacksonville Symphony and Fabio Mechetti, conducting (May 2010) • Performed in Bogota, Colombia (August 2010)

"Idoru, Piano Trio," a work for piano, violin and cello commissioned by the New Arts Trio for the 30th Anniversary Season at The Chautauqua Arts Institute (2008)

• "Allegro Chaconne" • "Andante Con Mosso" • "Moderato Con Fuoco"

Quintet for piano, violin, cello, flute & clarinet (Premiered at UNCSA, January 2008)

• "Habanera" • "Gitana"

"Three Cabinets of Wonder," concerto for violin and orchestra, recorded with the London Symphony, Ira Levin, conducting and Anastasia Khitruk, solo violin (January 2010)

"Unbearable Lightness of Being," for string orchestra, recorded with the London Symphony Orchestra, Ira Levin, conducting (January 2010)

"Chant D'Auvergne," Canteloube's folk song arrangements transformed into Nuevo Tango

• "Nai Pas" • "Brezairola," arranged by Michael Colina. Featuring Daniel Binelli (bandoneon), Polly Ferman (piano), Carole Rowley (vocal), Nicolas Danielson (violin), Pablo Asian (bass), and Martin Moretto (guitar)

"The Isles of Shoals," a concerto for flute and orchestra in three movements; an arrangement for flute & piano was recorded by Duo Brasilis (Music of the Americas, Meta Cultural label)

"To a Stranger," a song for soprano, tenor and string quartet

"Eye of the Ice," a ballet score commissioned by Richard Kuch for the NC Dance Theater

== Awards ==
=== Grammy awards ===
1. 1979 Hideaway David Sanborn, Warner Bros.
2. 1981 Voyeur David Sanborn, Warner Bros.
3. 2001 Cielo Azul, Latin Grammy Award, Nestor Torres, Shanachie Records

=== Other notable awards ===
- Ace Award "Best Film Score," Finnegan Begin Again, the 1985 Mary Tyler Moore/Robert Preston film; co-composed with saxophonist David Sanborn
