= Marcus Miller =

American musician, composer and producer (born 1959)

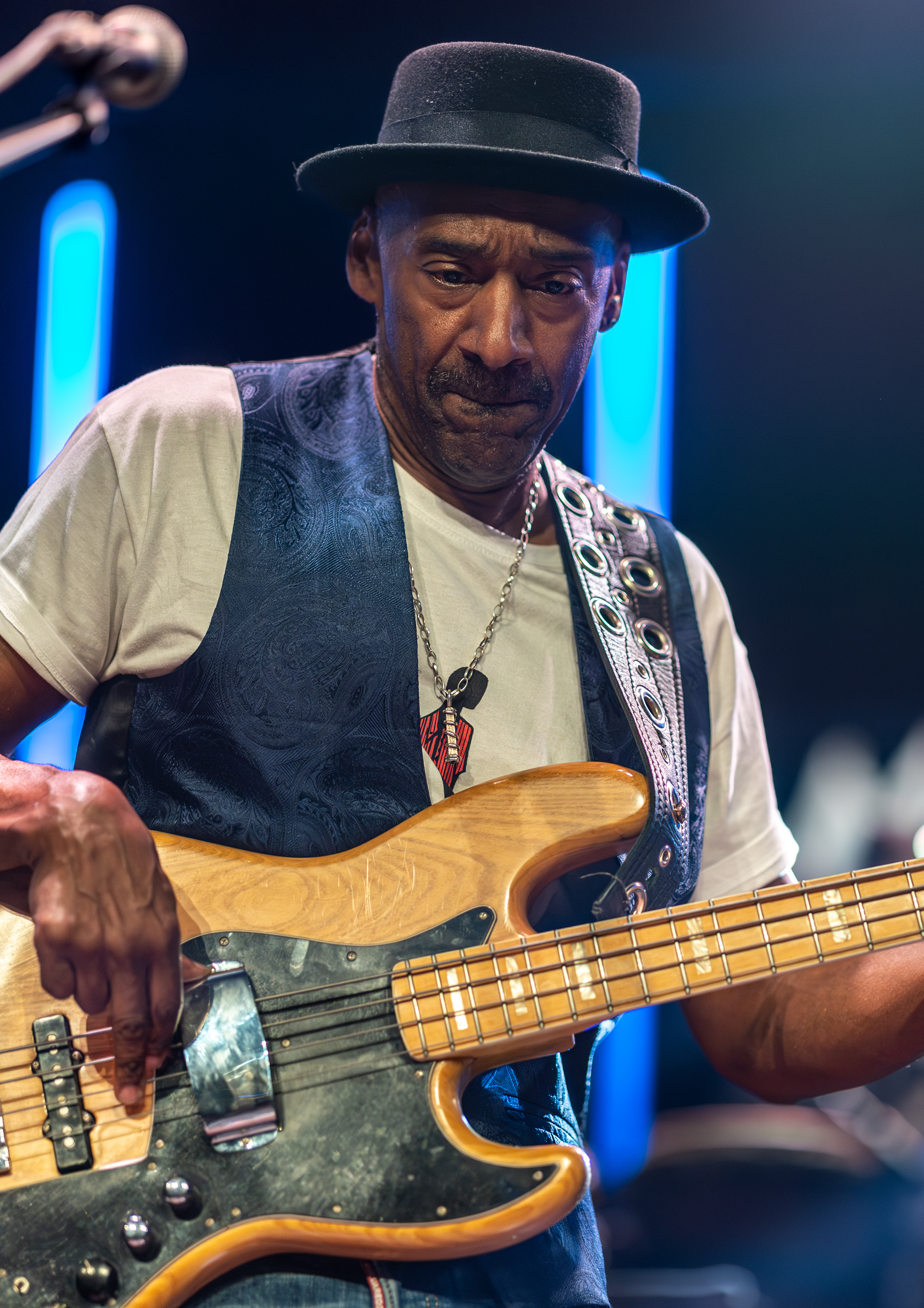
- Miller performing in 2026

Background information
- Born: William Henry Marcus Miller Jr. June 14, 1959 (age 67); New York City, U.S.
- Genres: Jazz; jazz fusion; R&B; rock; funk; smooth jazz
- Occupations: Musician; songwriter; record producer
- Instruments: Bass; guitar; vocals; saxophone; clarinet; keyboards; recorder
- Years active: 1975–present
- Website: marcusmiller.com

William Henry Marcus Miller Jr. (born June 14, 1959) is an American musician, songwriter and record producer. He has worked with trumpeter Miles Davis, pianist Herbie Hancock, singer Luther Vandross, and saxophonists Wayne Shorter and David Sanborn, among others. He was the main songwriter and producer on three of Davis's albums: Tutu (1986), Music from Siesta (1987), and Amandla (1989). His collaboration with Vandross was especially close; he co-produced and served as the arranger for most of Vandross's albums, and he and Vandross co-wrote many songs, including the hits "I Really Didn't Mean It", "Any Love", "Power of Love/Love Power" and "Don't Want to Be a Fool". Miller also co-wrote the 1988 single "Da Butt" for Experience Unlimited.

== Early life ==
William Henry Marcus Miller Jr. was born in the Brooklyn borough of New York City on June 14, 1959. He grew up in a musical family; his father, William Miller, was a church organist and choir director. Through his father, he is a cousin of jazz pianist Wynton Kelly. He became classically trained as a clarinetist and later learned to play keyboards, saxophone, and guitar in addition to bass.

== Career ==
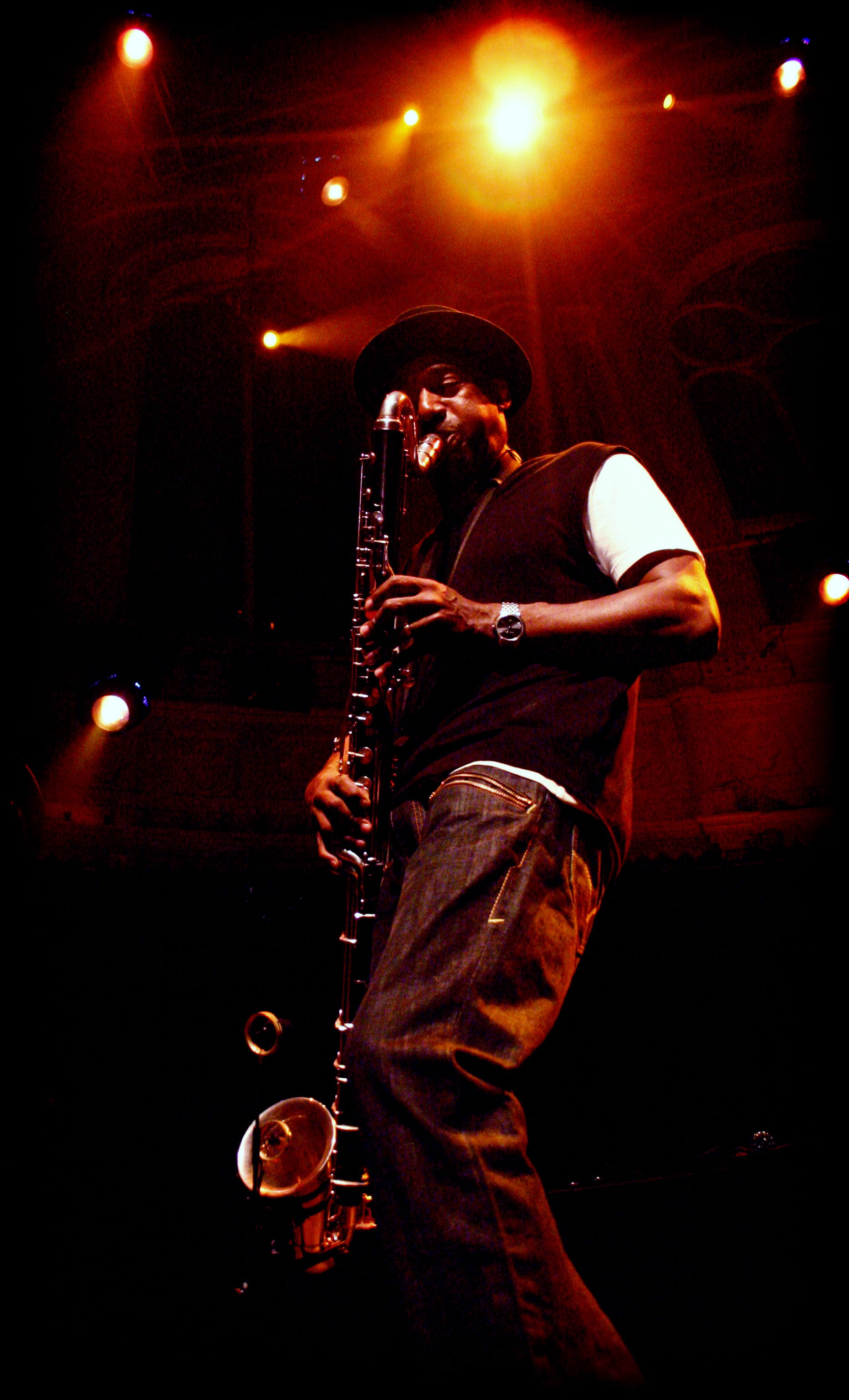
Miller in 2007

Miller began to work regularly in New York City, eventually playing bass and writing music for jazz flautist Bobbi Humphrey and keyboardist Lonnie Liston Smith. Miller's earliest influences include James Jamerson and Larry Graham. He spent approximately 15 years performing as a session musician. During that time he also arranged and produced frequently. He was a member of the Saturday Night Live band between 1979 and 1981. He co-wrote Aretha Franklin's "Jump To It" along with Luther Vandross, and sang alongside Vandross on the 1986 David Bowie single "Underground" from the movie Labyrinth. Miller has played bass on more than 500 recordings, appearing on albums by such artists as Michael Jackson, Beyoncé, Herbie Hancock, Mariah Carey, Eric Clapton, The Crusaders, Wayne Shorter, McCoy Tyner, Frank Sinatra, George Benson, Dr. John, Aretha Franklin, Elton John, Joe Walsh, Jean-Michel Jarre, Grover Washington Jr., Donald Fagen, Bill Withers, Bernard Wright, Kazumi Watanabe, Chaka Khan, LL Cool J and Flavio Sala. Miller won the "Most Valuable Player" award (given by NARAS to recognize studio musicians) three years in a row and was subsequently awarded "player emeritus" status and retired from eligibility.

In the mid-1980s, Miller began a solo career as a funk/R&B singer, with the albums Suddenly (1983) and Marcus Miller (1984). He was the main songwriter, producer and instrumentalist on these albums. He has since then released ten more solo albums, although he has only occasionally sung on these subsequent albums.

Between 1988 and 1990, Miller was the musical director and house band bass player (in the "Sunday Night Band") during two seasons of the late-night TV show Sunday Night (also known as Night Music) on NBC, hosted by David Sanborn and Jools Holland.

As a composer, Miller co-wrote and produced several songs on the Miles Davis album Tutu, including the title track. He also composed "Chicago Song" for David Sanborn and co-wrote "'Til My Baby Comes Home", "It's Over Now", "For You to Love", and "Power of Love" for Luther Vandross. Miller also wrote "Da Butt", which was featured in Spike Lee's School Daze. In addition, he composed and provided spoken vocals on "Burn it Up", which was featured on Najee's 1992 album Just An Illusion.

In 1997, Miller played bass guitar and bass clarinet in the supergroup Legends, featuring Eric Clapton (guitars and vocals), Joe Sample (piano), David Sanborn (alto sax) and Steve Gadd (drums). It was an 11-date tour of major jazz festivals in Europe. In 2008 Miller formed another supergroup, SMV, with fellow bassists Stanley Clarke and Victor Wooten, for a world tour lasting 18 months. He produced SMV's first release, Thunder. In the summer of 2011, Miller toured alongside Herbie Hancock and Wayne Shorter celebrating Miles Davis on the 20th anniversary of his death.

In 2017, Miller, along with Common, headlined the Playboy Jazz Festival.

Miller hosts a jazz history and influences show called Miller Time with Marcus Miller on the Real Jazz channel of Sirius XM Holdings satellite radio system. In addition to his recording and performance career, Miller has established a parallel career as a film score composer. He has written numerous scores for films, including films directed by Reginald Hudlin and Chris Rock.

Miller speaks French and Spanish, which he started learning in his late 40s. He has been known to speak it fluently during interviews, and has introduced songs such as "Preacher's Kid" – a story about his father, in concerts.

== Awards and honors ==
Miller has been nominated for numerous Grammy Awards as a producer for Miles Davis, Luther Vandross, David Sanborn, Bob James, Chaka Khan and Wayne Shorter, and has won two Grammys. He won a Grammy Award for Best R&B Song in 1992, for Luther Vandross' "Power of Love" and in 2001 he won for Best Contemporary Jazz Album for his seventh solo instrumental album, M². His 2015 album Afrodeezia earned a Grammy Award nomination for Best Contemporary Instrumental Album.

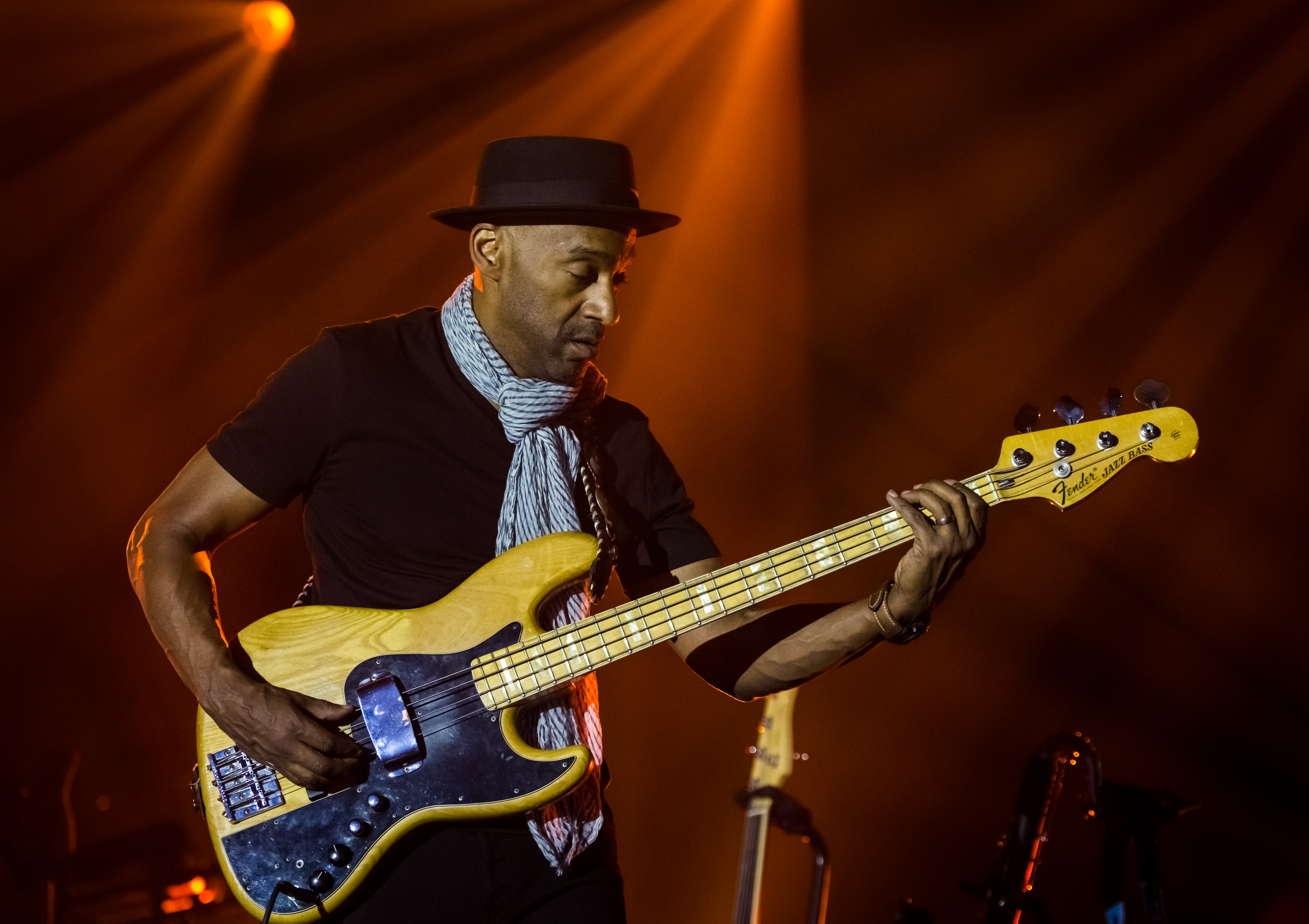
Miller in 2017

In 2012, Miller was appointed a UNESCO Artist for Peace, supporting and promoting the UNESCO Slave Route Project.

In December 2021, Bass Player magazine awarded Miller a Lifetime Achievement Award.

== Instruments ==
Miller plays a transparent blonde finish 1977 Fender Jazz Bass that was modified by luthier Roger Sadowsky with the addition of a Stars Guitar and later a Bartolini TCT preamp so he could control his sound in the studio. Fender started to produce a Marcus Miller signature Fender Jazz Bass in four-string (made in Japan) and five-string (made in U.S) versions. Later, Fender moved the production of the four-string to their Mexico factory and discontinued both four- and five-string models in 2015. DR Strings also produced a series of Marcus Miller signature stainless-steel strings known as "Fat Beams", which come in a variety of sizes. In 2015, the Korean company Sire Guitars began the production and sale of the Marcus Miller V7, a signature model based on Miller’s previous Fender Jazz bass. They have since expanded their range to include a wider array of body shapes, styles, and price points. Also in 2015, Dunlop began producing Marcus Miller Super Bright bass strings which Miller switched to.

== Discography ==
=== Studio albums ===
Year	Title	US Pop	US R&B	US Jazz	US C. Jazz	US Indie	UK Jazz	Label
1983	Suddenly							Warner Bros.
1984	Marcus Miller							Warner Bros.
1993	The Sun Don't Lie		93	10	7			Dreyfus Jazz
1995	Tales			12	7		2	Dreyfus Jazz
2001	M²			2	1	27	6	Telarc
2005	Silver Rain			5	2	15		Koch
2007	Free	—N/a	—N/a	—N/a	—N/a	—N/a		Dreyfus Jazz
2008	Marcus	191	29	7	3			Concord
2012	Renaissance	170		1	1		17	Concord
2015	Afrodeezia			3	1		6	Blue Note
2018	Laid Black			1	1		12	Blue Note

=== Collaborative albums ===
Year	Title	US Pop	US R&B	US Jazz	US C. Jazz	US Indie	UK Jazz	Label
1987	Music from Siesta with Miles Davis				12			Warner Bros./WEA
2008	Thunder as SMV	186		3				Heads Up

=== Live albums ===
Year	Title	Year recorded	US Jazz	US C. Jazz	UK Jazz	Label
1997	Live & More	1996	8	6	10	Dreyfus Jazz
2002	The Ozell Tapes Live: The Official Bootleg	2002			26	3 Deuces
2003	Dreyfus Night in Paris (with Michel Petrucciani, Biréli Lagrène, Kenny Garrett and Lenny White)	1994				Dreyfus Jazz
2010	A Night in Monte Carlo (with Monte-Carlo Philharmonic Orchestra)	2009	16	10		Dreyfus Jazz

=== Singles ===
Year	Title	Peak chart positions				Album
Year	Title	Hot R&B/ Hip-Hop Songs	Smooth Jazz Airplay	Dance Club Songs	Adult R&B Airplay	Album
1983	"Lovin' You"	55	—N/a	—	—N/a	Suddenly
1984	"My Best Friend's Girlfriend"	53	—N/a	36	—N/a	Marcus Miller
2008	"Free" (Marcus Miller featuring Corinne Bailey Rae)	—	9	—	19	Marcus
2012	"Detroit" (Marcus Miller)	—	14	—	—	Renaissance
2019	"Korogocho" (Kirk Whalum featuring Marcus Miller and Barry Likumahuwa)	—	5	—	—	Kirk Whalum – Humanité
2021	"The City That Never Sleeps" (Philippe Saisse featuring Marcus Miller)	—	18	—	—	Philippe Saisse – (Non-album single)
2025	"On the Road" (Brian Culbertson featuring Marcus Miller and Sheila E.)	—	1	—	—	Brian Culbertson – Day Trip
"—" denotes a recording that did not chart.

=== Music videos ===
- Master of All Trades (Dreyfus Jazz, 2005)[DVD-Video]
- Free (JVC, 2007) Japanese special virsion [CD + DVD-Video]
- Tutu Revisited – Live 2010 (Dreyfus Jazz, 2011)[2CD + DVD-Video] – featuring Christian Scott
- Live in Lugano - July 2008 (Immortal, 2012)[DVD-Video]

=== As a member ===
The Jamaica Boys

- The Jamaica Boys (WEA, 1987)
- J. Boys (Reprise, 1990)

Legends
(With Eric Clapton, David Sanborn, Joe Sample and Steve Gadd)

- Legends Live at Montreux 1997 (Eagle Vision, 2005)[DVD-Video]
- Gasteiz Jazz Festival Spain 1997 (Alive the Live, 2019)[2CD]

=== As sideman ===
With George Benson

- In Your Eyes (Warner Bros., 1983)
- 20/20 (Warner Bros., 1985)
- While the City Sleeps... (Warner Bros., 1986)
- Twice the Love (Warner Bros., 1988)
- Songs and Stories (Concord, 2009)

With Jonathan Butler

- Heal Our Hand (Jive, 1990)
- Ubuntu (Artistry, 2023)

With Mariah Carey

- Mariah Carey (Columbia, 1990)
- Merry Christmas (Columbia, 1994)

With Miles Davis

- The Man with the Horn (Columbia, 1981)
- We Want Miles (Columbia, 1982)
- Star People (Columbia, 1983)
- Tutu (Warner Bros., 1986)
- Amandla (Warner Bros., 1989)
- The Complete Miles Davis at Montreux (Warner Bros., 2002)[20CD] – box set

With Will Downing

- Invitation Only (Mercury, 1997)
- Sensual Journey (Verve, 2002)

With Bryan Ferry

- Boys and Girls (E.G., 1985) – 1 track
- Bête Noire (Virgin, 1987)
- Frantic (Virgin, 2002)
- Olympia (Virgin, 2010)
- Avonmore (BMG, 2014)

With Roberta Flack

- I'm the One (Atlantic, 1982)
- Oasis (Atlantic, 1988)

With Aretha Franklin

- Love All the Hurt Away (Arista, 1981)
- Jump to It (Arista, 1982)
- Get It Right (Arista, 1983)
- What You See Is What You Sweat (Arista, 1991)

With Michael Franks

- Skin Dive (Warner Bros., 1985)
- The Camera Never Lies (Warner Bros., 1987)

With Chaka Khan

- Naughty (Warner Bros., 1980)
- Chaka Khan (Warner Bros., 1982)
- Destiny (Warner Bros., 1986)
- ck (Warner Bros., 1988)
- The Woman I Am (Warner Bros., 1992)

With Cheryl Lynn

- In the Night (Columbia, 1981)
- Instant Love (Columbia, 1982)

With Michael McDonald

- Blink of an Eye (Reprise, 1993)
- Wide Open (BMG, 2017)

With Melba Moore

- Burn (Epic, 1979)
- A Lot of Love (Capitol, 1986)

With Odyssey

- Hang Together (RCA Victor, 1980)
- Happy Together (RCA Victor, 1982)

With David Sanborn

- Hideaway (Warner Bros., 1980)
- Voyeur (Warner Bros., 1981) – rec. 1980
- As We Speak (Warner Bros., 1982)
- Backstreet (Warner Bros., 1983)
- Straight to the Heart (Warner Bros., 1984) – live
- Double Vision with Bob James (Warner Bros., 1986)
- Change of Heart (Warner Bros., 1987)
- Close-Up (Reprise, 1988)
- Another Hand (Elektra Musician, 1991)
- Upfront (Elektra, 1992)
- Hearsay (Elektra, 1994)
- Pearls (Elektra, 1995)
- Lovesongs (Warner Bros., 1995)
- Songs from the Night Before (Elektra Entertainment, 1996)
- Inside (Elektra, 1999)

With Grover Washington Jr.

- Skylarkin' (Motown, 1980) – rec. 1979
- Winelight (Elektra, 1980)
- Come Morning (Elektra, 1981)
- The Best Is Yet to Come (Elektra, 1982)
- Inside Moves (Elektra, 1984)
- A House Full of Love (Columbia, 1986) – rec. 1985

With Was (Not Was)

- What Up, Dog? (Chrysalis, 1988) – rec. 1984-1988
- Boo! (Rkyodisc, 2008)

With others

- Mindi Abair, Based on a True Story (Pretty Good For A Girl, 2025)
- Joan Armatrading, Me Myself I (A&M, 1980)
- Sweet Pea Atkinson, Get What You Deserve (Blue Note, 2017)
- Aztec Camera, Love (Sire, 1987)
- Bee Gees, E.S.P. (Warner Bros., 1987)
- Jonatha Brooke, Steady Pull (Bad Dog, 2001)
- Tom Browne, Browne Sugar (GRP, 1979)
- Peabo Bryson & Roberta Flack, Born to Love (Capitol, 1983)
- Peabo Bryson, Take No Prisoners (Elektra, 1985)
- Jimmy Buffett, Hot Water (MCA, 1988)
- Felix Cavaliere, Castles in the Air (Epic, 1979)
- Natalie Cole, Everlasting (Manhattan, 1987)
- Linda Clifford, I'll Keep on Loving You (Capitol, 1982)
- Don Cherry, Hear & Now (Atlantic, 1977)
- Bootsy Collins, Fantaazma, "Funk Not Fight" (Bootzilla, 2023)
- The Crusaders, Healing the Wounds (GRP, 1991)
- Donald Fagen, The Nightfly (Warner Bros., 1982)
- Dizzy Gillespie, Closer to the Source (Atlantic, 1984)
- Dave Grusin, Mountain Dance (Arista, 1980)
- Whitney Houston, Whitney (Arista, 1987)
- Billy Idol, Whiplash Smile (Chrysalis, 1986)
- Paul Jabara, Paul Jabara & Friends (Columbia, 1983)
- Jean-Michel Jarre, Zoolook (Dreyfus, 1984)
- Al Jarreau & George Benson, Givin' It Up (Concord, 2006)
- Al Jarreau, My Old Friend: Celebrating George Duke (Concord, 2014)
- Dr. John, In a Sentimental Mood (Warner Bros., 1989)
- Elton John, Victim of Love (MCA, 1979)
- Toshiki Kadomatsu, "初恋 = Hatsu Koi" (Air, 1985) – single
- Keb' Mo', Good to Be... (Rounder, 2022)
- Toby Keith, American Ride (Show Dog, 2009)
- Ben E. King, Music Trance (Atlantic, 1980)
- Julian Lennon, Valotte (Atlantic, 1984)
- Richard Marx, Rush Street (Capitol, 1991)
- Stephanie Mills, Tantalizingly Hot (Casablanca, 1982)
- Teddy Pendergrass, Love Language (Asylum, 1984)
- Corinne Bailey Rae, The Heart Speaks in Whispers (Virgin, 2016)
- Lou Rawls, Now Is the Time (Epic, 1982)
- Boz Scaggs, Other Roads (Columbia, 1988)
- Wayne Shorter, High Life (Verve, 1995)
- Janis Siegel, Experiment in White (Wounded Bird, 1982)
- Carly Simon, Hello Big Man (Warner Bros., 1983)
- Paul Simon, Hearts and Bones (Warner Bros., 1983)
- Frank Sinatra, L.A. Is My Lady (Qwest, 1984)
- Lonnie Liston Smith, Dreams of Tomorrow (Doctor Jazz, 1983)
- The Spinners, Labor of Love (Atlantic, 1981)
- The Temptations, Touch Me (Gordy, 1985)
- Kenny Vance, Short Vacation (Gold Castle, 1988)
- Dionne Warwick, How Many Times Can We Say Goodbye (Arista, 1983)
- Bill Withers, Watching You, Watching Me (Columbia, 1985)
- Bernard Wright, Nard (GRP, 1981)

== Film scores ==
- 1987: Siesta
- 1990: House Party (featuring Kid 'n Play)
- 1992: Boomerang (featuring Eddie Murphy)
- 1994: Above the Rim (featuring Tupac Shakur)
- 1994: A Low Down Dirty Shame (featuring Keenen Ivory Wayans)
- 1996: The Great White Hype (featuring Samuel L. Jackson)
- 1997: The Sixth Man (featuring Marlon Wayans)
- 1999: An American Love Story
- 2000: The Ladies Man (featuring Tim Meadows)
- 2001: The Trumpet of the Swan (featuring Reese Witherspoon)
- 2001: The Brothers (featuring Morris Chestnut)
- 2001: Two Can Play That Game (featuring Vivica A. Fox)
- 2002: Serving Sara (featuring Matthew Perry)
- 2003: Deliver Us from Eva (featuring LL Cool J)
- 2003: Head of State (featuring Chris Rock)
- 2004: Breakin' All the Rules (featuring Jamie Foxx)
- 2005: King's Ransom (featuring Anthony Anderson)
- 2005: Everybody Hates Chris (featuring Chris Rock and Tichina Arnold)
- 2006: Save the Last Dance 2 (featuring Izabella Miko)
- 2007: I Think I Love My Wife (featuring Chris Rock)
- 2007: This Christmas (featuring Idris Elba)
- 2009: Good Hair (Chris Rock documentary)
- 2009: Obsessed (featuring Beyoncé Knowles)
- 2012: Think Like a Man
- 2014: About Last Night
- 2017: Marshall
- 2020: Safety
- 2022: Sidney
- 2023: Candy Cane Lane

== Media appearances ==
In 2017, Miller appeared on the Armenian talk show Nice Evening.
