= 56th Annual Grammy Awards =

2014 US music awards ceremony

- Official poster
- Date: January 26, 2014; 5:00–8:30 p.m. PST
- Location: Staples Center, Los Angeles, California, U.S.
- Hosted by: LL Cool J

Highlights
- Most awards: Daft Punk (5)
- Most nominations: Jay-Z (9)
- Website: 56th Annual Grammy Awards

Television/radio coverage
- Network: CBS
- Viewership: 28.5 million viewers.

The 56th Annual Grammy Awards presentation was held on January 26, 2014, at Staples Center in Los Angeles. The show was broadcast on CBS at 8 p.m. ET/PT and was hosted for the third time by LL Cool J. The show was moved to January to avoid competing with the 2014 Winter Olympics in Sochi, as was the case in 2010.

The eligibility period for the 56th Annual Grammy Awards was October 1, 2012, to September 30, 2013. The nominations were announced on December 6, 2013 during a live televised concert on CBS, The Grammy Nominations Concert Live – Countdown to Music's Biggest Night. Jay-Z received the most nominations with nine. Justin Timberlake, Kendrick Lamar, Macklemore & Ryan Lewis and Pharrell Williams each received seven nominations. Daft Punk and Pharrell Williams were nominated twice for both Album of the Year and Record of the Year. Sound engineer Bob Ludwig received the most nominations by a non-performing artist, with five.

Daft Punk won five awards, including Album of the Year for Random Access Memories and Record of the Year, with Pharrell Williams, for "Get Lucky", Best Pop Duo/Group Performance, and an additional win for Best Engineered Album, Non-Classical completing a clean sweep for the project that night. Macklemore and Ryan Lewis won four trophies, including Best New Artist, and led an industry show of support for gay marriage with a performance of their song "Same Love" to accompany a mass wedding of gay and heterosexual couples, which was presided over by Queen Latifah. Lorde's "Royals" received awards for Best Pop Solo Performance and Song of the Year, becoming the youngest artist to win the category at 17 years old. Carole King was honored as MusiCares Person of the Year on January 24, two days prior to the awards ceremony.

On June 4, 2013, the Recording Academy approved a number of changes recommended by its Awards & Nominations Committee, including adding a new category for Best American Roots Song to the American Music field. This songwriters' award will encompass all the subgenres in this field such as Americana, bluegrass, blues, folk, and regional roots music. The Best Hard Rock/Metal Performance category was renamed Best Metal Performance and became a stand-alone category. Hard rock performances will now be screened in the Best Rock Performance category. The Music Video field will become the Best Music Video/Film field. Its two categories will be renamed: Best Short Form Music Video will now be known as Best Music Video and Best Long Form Music Video will change into Best Music Film. These changes bring the total number of categories at the 2014 Grammy Awards to 82, up from 81 at the 2013 Grammy Awards.

== Performers ==
Artist(s)	Song(s)
Beyoncé; Jay-Z	"Drunk in Love"
Lorde	"Royals"
Hunter Hayes	"Invisible"
Katy Perry; Juicy J	"Dark Horse"
Robin Thicke; Chicago	"Does Anybody Really Know What Time It Is?" "Beginnings" "Saturday in the Park" "Blurred Lines"
Keith Urban; Gary Clark Jr.	"Cop Car"
John Legend	"All of Me"
Taylor Swift	"All Too Well"
P!nk; Nate Ruess	"Try" "Just Give Me a Reason"
Ringo Starr	"Photograph"
Kendrick Lamar; Imagine Dragons	"m.A.A.d city" "Radioactive"
Kacey Musgraves	"Follow Your Arrow"
Paul McCartney; Ringo Starr	"Queenie Eye"
Merle Haggard; Kris Kristofferson; Willie Nelson; Blake Shelton	"Highwayman" "Okie from Muskogee" "Mammas Don't Let Your Babies Grow Up to Be Cowboys"
Daft Punk; Nile Rodgers; Stevie Wonder; Pharrell Williams	"Get Lucky" "Harder, Better, Faster, Stronger" "Lose Yourself to Dance" "Le Freak" "Another Star" "Around the World"
Sara Bareilles; Carole King	"Beautiful" "Brave"
Metallica; Lang Lang	"One"
Macklemore & Ryan Lewis; Mary Lambert; Madonna; Queen Latifah; Trombone Shorty; Orleans Avenue	"Same Love" "Open Your Heart"
Billie Joe Armstrong; Miranda Lambert	Tribute to Phil Everly "When Will I Be Loved"
Nine Inch Nails; Queens of the Stone Age; Dave Grohl; Lindsey Buckingham	"Copy of A" "My God Is the Sun"

== Presenters ==
- Pharrell Williams and Anna Kendrick – presented Best New Artist
- Anna Faris and Juanes – presented Best Pop Duo/Group Performance
- Steve Coogan – introduced Katy Perry
- Bruno Mars – introduced P!nk
- Ariana Grande and Miguel – presented Best Pop Solo Performance
- Black Sabbath – introduced Paul McCartney and Ringo Starr
- Jamie Foxx – presented Best Rap/Sung Collaboration
- Julia Roberts – introduced Paul McCartney
- Gloria Estefan and Marc Anthony – presented Best Pop Vocal Album
- Jeremy Renner – introduced Willie Nelson, Blake Shelton, Merle Haggard and Kris Kristofferson
- Zac Brown and Martina McBride – presented Best Country Album
- Neil Patrick Harris – introduced Daft Punk
- Cyndi Lauper – introduced Sara Bareilles and Carole King
- Sara Bareilles and Carole King – presented Song of the Year
- Jared Leto – introduced Metallica
- Smokey Robinson and Steven Tyler – presented Record of the Year
- Queen Latifah – introduced Macklemore & Ryan Lewis
- John Legend and Ryan Seacrest – presented Music Educator Award
- Lang Lang – introduced "In Memoriam"
- Olivia Harrison, Alicia Keys and Yoko Ono – presented Album of the Year

== Winners and nominees ==
The winners and nominees per category were:

=== General ===
Record of the Year

- "Get Lucky" – Daft Punk, Pharrell Williams & Nile Rodgers
  - Thomas Bangalter & Guy-Manuel de Homem-Christo, producers;
  - Peter Franco, Mick Guzauski, Florian Lagatta & Daniel Lerner, engineers/mixers;
  - Bob Ludwig & Antoine Chabert, mastering engineers
- "Radioactive" – Imagine Dragons
  - Alex Da Kid, producer;
  - Manny Marroquin & Josh Mosser, engineers/mixers;
  - Joe LaPorta, mastering engineer
- "Royals" – Lorde
  - Joel Little, producer;
  - Joel Little, engineer/mixer;
  - Stuart Hawkes, mastering engineer
- "Locked Out of Heaven" – Bruno Mars
  - Jeff Bhasker, Emile Haynie, Mark Ronson & The Smeezingtons, producers;
  - Alalal, Josh Blair, Wayne Gordon, Ari Levine, Manny Marroquin & Mark Ronson, engineers/mixers;
  - David Kutch, mastering engineer
- "Blurred Lines" – Robin Thicke featuring T.I. and Pharrell Williams
  - Pharrell, producer;
  - Andrew Coleman & Tony Maserati, engineers/mixers;
  - Chris Gehringer, mastering engineer

Album of the Year

- Random Access Memories – Daft Punk
  - Julian Casablancas, DJ Falcon, Todd Edwards, Chilly Gonzales, Giorgio Moroder, Panda Bear, Nile Rodgers, Paul Williams & Pharrell Williams, featured artists;
  - Thomas Bangalter, Julian Casablancas, Guy-Manuel de Homem-Christo, DJ Falcon & Todd Edwards, producers;
  - Peter Franco, Mick Guzauski, Florian Lagatta, Guillaume Le Braz & Daniel Lerner, engineers/mixers;
  - Antoine Chabert & Bob Ludwig, mastering engineers
- The Blessed Unrest – Sara Bareilles
  - Sara Bareilles, Mark Endert & John O'Mahony, producers;
  - Jeremy Darby, Mark Endert & John O'Mahony, engineers/mixers;
  - Greg Calbi, mastering engineer
- Good Kid, M.A.A.D City – Kendrick Lamar
  - Mary J. Blige, Dr. Dre, Drake, Jay Rock, Jay-Z, MC Eiht & Anna Wise, featured artists;
  - DJ Dahi, Hit-Boy, Skhye Hutch, Just Blaze, Like, Terrace Martin, Dawaun Parker, Pharrell, Rahki, Scoop DeVille, Sounwave, Jack Splash, Tabu, Tha Bizness & T-Minus, producers;
  - Derek Ali, Dee Brown, Dr. Dre, James Hunt, Mauricio "Veto" Iragorri, Mike Larson, Jared Scott, Jack Splash & Andrew Wright, engineers/mixers;
  - Mike Bozzi & Brian "Big Bass" Gardner, mastering engineers
- Red – Taylor Swift
  - Gary Lightbody & Ed Sheeran, featured artists;
  - Jeff Bhasker, Nathan Chapman, Dann Huff, Jacknife Lee, Max Martin, Shellback, Taylor Swift, Butch Walker & Dan Wilson, producers;
  - Joe Baldridge, Sam Bell, Matt Bishop, Chad Carlson, Nathan Chapman, Serban Ghenea, John Hanes, Sam Holland, Michael Ilbert, Tyler Johnson, Jacknife Lee, Steve Marcantonio, Manny Marroquin, Justin Niebank, John Rausch, Eric Robinson, Pawel Sek, Jake Sinclair, Mark "Spike" Stent & Andy Thompson, engineers/mixers;
  - Tom Coyne & Hank Williams, mastering engineers
- The Heist – Macklemore & Ryan Lewis
  - Ab-Soul, Ben Bridwell, Ray Dalton, Eighty4 Fly, Hollis, Mary Lambert, Baffalo Madonna, Evan Roman, Schoolboy Q, Allen Stone, The Teaching & Wanz, featured artists;
  - Ryan Lewis, producer;
  - Ben Haggerty, Ryan Lewis, Amos Miller, Reed Ruddy & Pete Stewart, engineers/mixers;
  - Tom Coyne & Brian "Big Bass" Gardner, mastering engineer

Song of the Year

- "Royals"
  - Ella Yelich O'Connor, Joel Little, songwriters (Lorde)
- "Just Give Me a Reason"
  - P!nk, Jeff Bhasker and Nate Ruess, songwriters (P!nk featuring Nate Ruess)
- "Locked Out of Heaven"
  - Bruno Mars, Philip Lawrence, Ari Levine, songwriters (Bruno Mars)
- "Roar"
  - Katy Perry, Lukasz Gottwald, Max Martin, Bonnie McKee and Henry Walter, songwriters (Katy Perry)
- "Same Love"
  - Ben Haggerty, Ryan Lewis and Mary Lambert, songwriters (Macklemore & Ryan Lewis featuring Mary Lambert)

Best New Artist

- Macklemore & Ryan Lewis
- James Blake
- Kendrick Lamar
- Kacey Musgraves
- Ed Sheeran

=== Pop ===
Best Pop Solo Performance

- "Royals" – Lorde
- "Brave" – Sara Bareilles
- "When I Was Your Man" – Bruno Mars
- "Roar" – Katy Perry
- "Mirrors" – Justin Timberlake

Best Pop Duo/Group Performance

- "Get Lucky" – Daft Punk, Pharrell Williams & Nile Rodgers
- "Just Give Me a Reason" – P!nk featuring Nate Ruess
- "Stay" – Rihanna & Mikky Ekko
- "Blurred Lines" – Robin Thicke featuring T.I. and Pharrell Williams
- "Suit & Tie" – Justin Timberlake & Jay-Z

Best Pop Instrumental Album

- Steppin' Out – Herb Alpert
- The Beat – Boney James
- HandPicked – Earl Klugh
- Summer Horns – Dave Koz, Gerald Albright, Mindi Abair & Richard Elliot
- Hacienda – Jeff Lorber Fusion

Best Pop Vocal Album

- Unorthodox Jukebox – Bruno Mars
- Paradise – Lana Del Rey
- Pure Heroine – Lorde
- Blurred Lines – Robin Thicke
- The 20/20 Experience – The Complete Experience – Justin Timberlake

=== Dance/Electronica ===
Best Dance Recording

- "Clarity" – Zedd & Foxes
  - Anton Zaslavski (Zedd), producer and mixer
- "Need U (100%)" – Duke Dumont featuring A*M*E & MNEK
  - Adam Dyment & Tommy Forrest, producers; Adam Dyment & Tommy Forrest, mixers
- "Sweet Nothing" – Calvin Harris & Florence Welch
  - Calvin Harris, producer; Calvin Harris, mixer
- "Atmosphere" – Kaskade
  - Finn Bjarnson & Ryan Raddon, producers; Ryan Raddon, mixer
- "This Is What It Feels Like" – Armin Van Buuren & Trevor Guthrie
  - Armin Van Buuren & Benno De Goeij, producers; Armin Van Buuren & Benno De Goeij, mixers

Best Dance/Electronica Album

- Random Access Memories – Daft Punk
- Settle – Disclosure
- 18 Months – Calvin Harris
- Atmosphere – Kaskade
- A Color Map of the Sun – Pretty Lights

=== Traditional Pop ===
Best Traditional Pop Vocal Album

- To Be Loved – Michael Bublé (with Bob Rock)
- Viva Duets – Tony Bennett and various artists
- The Standards – Gloria Estefan
- Cee Lo's Magic Moment – Cee Lo Green
- Now – Dionne Warwick

=== Rock ===
Best Rock Performance

- "Radioactive" – Imagine Dragons
- "Kashmir (Live)" – Led Zeppelin
- "Always Alright" – Alabama Shakes
- "The Stars (Are Out Tonight)" – David Bowie
- "My God Is the Sun" – Queens of the Stone Age
- "I'm Shakin'" – Jack White

Best Metal Performance

- "God Is Dead?" – Black Sabbath
- "T.N.T." – Anthrax
- "The Enemy Inside" – Dream Theater
- "In Due Time" – Killswitch Engage
- "Room 24" – Volbeat & King Diamond

Best Rock Song

- "Cut Me Some Slack"
  - Dave Grohl, Paul McCartney, Krist Novoselic & Pat Smear, songwriters (Paul McCartney, Dave Grohl, Krist Novoselic, Pat Smear)
- "Ain't Messin 'Round"
  - Gary Clark Jr., songwriter (Gary Clark Jr.)
- "Doom and Gloom"
  - Mick Jagger & Keith Richards, songwriters (The Rolling Stones)
- "God Is Dead?"
  - Geezer Butler, Tony Iommi & Ozzy Osbourne, songwriters (Black Sabbath)
- "Panic Station"
  - Matt Bellamy, songwriter (Muse)

Best Rock Album

- Celebration Day – Led Zeppelin
- 13 – Black Sabbath
- The Next Day – David Bowie
- Mechanical Bull – Kings of Leon
- ...Like Clockwork – Queens of the Stone Age
- Psychedelic Pill – Neil Young & Crazy Horse

=== Alternative ===
Best Alternative Music Album

- Modern Vampires of the City – Vampire Weekend
- The Worse Things Get, The Harder I Fight, The Harder I Fight, The More I Love You – Neko Case
- Trouble Will Find Me – The National
- Hesitation Marks – Nine Inch Nails
- Lonerism – Tame Impala

=== R&B ===
Best R&B Performance

- "Something" – Snarky Puppy & Lalah Hathaway
- "Love and War" – Tamar Braxton
- "Best of Me" – Anthony Hamilton
- "Nakamarra" – Hiatus Kaiyote & Q-Tip
- "How Many Drinks?" – Miguel & Kendrick Lamar

Best Traditional R&B Performance

- "Please Come Home"– Gary Clark Jr.
- "Get It Right" – Fantasia
- "Quiet Fire" – Maysa
- "Hey Laura" – Gregory Porter
- "Yesterday'" – Ryan Shaw

Best R&B Song

- "Pusher Love Girl"
  - James Fauntleroy, Jerome Harmon, Timothy Mosley & Justin Timberlake, songwriters (Justin Timberlake)
- "Best of Me"
  - Anthony Hamilton & Jairus Mozee, songwriters (Anthony Hamilton)
- "Love and War"
  - Tamar Braxton, Darhyl Camper Jr., LaShawn Daniels & Makeba Riddick, songwriters (Tamar Braxton)
- "Only One"
  - PJ Morton, songwriter (PJ Morton & Stevie Wonder)
- "Without Me"
  - Fantasia, Missy Elliott, Al Sherrod Lambert, Harmony Samuels & Kyle Stewart, songwriters (Fantasia featuring Kelly Rowland & Missy Elliott)

Best Urban Contemporary Album

- Unapologetic – Rihanna
- Love and War – Tamar Braxton
- Side Effects of You – Fantasia
- One: In the Chamber – Salaam Remi
- New York: A Love Story – Mack Wilds

Best R&B Album

- Girl on Fire – Alicia Keys
- R&B Divas – Faith Evans
- Love in the Future – John Legend
- Better – Chrisette Michele
- Three Kings – TGT

=== Rap ===
Best Rap Performance

- "Thrift Shop" – Macklemore & Ryan Lewis featuring Wanz
- "Swimming Pools (Drank)" – Kendrick Lamar
- "Berzerk" – Eminem
- "Started from the Bottom" – Drake
- "Tom Ford" – Jay-Z

Best Rap/Sung Collaboration

- "Holy Grail" – Jay-Z & Justin Timberlake
- "Now or Never" – Kendrick Lamar & Mary J. Blige
- "Power Trip" – J. Cole & Miguel
- "Remember You" – Wiz Khalifa & The Weeknd
- "Part II (On the Run)" – Jay-Z & Beyoncé

Best Rap Song

- "Thrift Shop"
  - Ben Haggerty & Ryan Lewis, songwriters (Macklemore & Ryan Lewis featuring Wanz)
- "F**in' Problems"
  - Tauheed Epps, Aubrey Graham, Kendrick Lamar, Rakim Mayers & Noah Shebib, songwriters (ASAP Rocky featuring Drake, 2 Chainz & Kendrick Lamar)
- "Holy Grail"
  - Shawn Carter, Terius Nash, J. Harmon, Timothy Mosley, Justin Timberlake & Ernest Wilson, songwriters (Kurt Cobain, Dave Grohl & Krist Novoselic, songwriters) (Jay-Z & Justin Timberlake)
- "New Slaves"
  - Christopher Breaux, Ben Bronfman, Mike Dean, Louis Johnson, Malik Jones, Elon Rutberg, Sakiya Sandifer, Che Smith, Kanye West & Cydell Young, songwriters (Anna Adamis & Gabor Presser, songwriters) (Kanye West)
- "Started from the Bottom"
  - W. Coleman, Aubrey Graham & Noah Shebib, songwriters (Bruno Sanfilippo, songwriter) (Drake)

Best Rap Album

- The Heist – Macklemore & Ryan Lewis
- Nothing Was the Same – Drake
- good kid, m.A.A.d city – Kendrick Lamar
- Magna Carta... Holy Grail – Jay-Z
- Yeezus – Kanye West

=== Country ===
Best Country Solo Performance

- "Wagon Wheel" – Darius Rucker
- "I Drive Your Truck" – Lee Brice
- "I Want Crazy" – Hunter Hayes
- "Mama's Broken Heart" – Miranda Lambert
- "Mine Would Be You" – Blake Shelton

Best Country Duo/Group Performance

- "From This Valley" – The Civil Wars
- "Don't Rush" – Kelly Clarkson & Vince Gill
- "Your Side of the Bed" – Little Big Town
- "Highway Don't Care" – Tim McGraw, Taylor Swift & Keith Urban
- "You Can't Make Old Friends" – Kenny Rogers & Dolly Parton

Best Country Song

- "Merry Go 'Round"
  - Shane McAnally, Kacey Musgraves & Josh Osborne, songwriters (Kacey Musgraves)
- "Begin Again"
  - Taylor Swift, songwriter (Taylor Swift)
- "I Drive Your Truck"
  - Jessi Alexander, Connie Harrington & Jimmy Yeary, songwriters (Lee Brice)
- "Mama's Broken Heart"
  - Brandy Clark, Shane McAnally & Kacey Musgraves, songwriters (Miranda Lambert)
- "Mine Would Be You"
  - Jessi Alexander, Connie Harrington & Deric Ruttan, songwriters (Blake Shelton)

Best Country Album

- Same Trailer Different Park – Kacey Musgraves
- Night Train – Jason Aldean
- Two Lanes of Freedom – Tim McGraw
- Based on a True Story... – Blake Shelton
- Red – Taylor Swift

=== New Age ===
Best New Age Album

- Love's River – Laura Sullivan
- Lux – Brian Eno
- Illumination – Peter Kater
- Final Call – Kitaro
- Awakening The Fire – R. Carlos Nakai & Will Clipman

=== Jazz ===
Best Improvised Jazz Solo

- "Orbits" – Wayne Shorter, soloist
- "Don't Run" – Terence Blanchard, soloist
- "Song for Maura" – Paquito D'Rivera, soloist
- "Song Without Words #4: Duet" – Fred Hersch, soloist
- "Stadium Jazz" – Donny McCaslin, soloist

Best Jazz Vocal Album

- Liquid Spirit – Gregory Porter
- The World According to Andy Bey – Andy Bey
- Attachments – Lorraine Feather
- WomanChild – Cécile McLorin Salvant
- After Blue – Tierney Sutton

Best Jazz Instrumental Album

- Money Jungle: Provocative in Blue – Terri Lyne Carrington
- Guided Tour – The New Gary Burton Quartet
- Life Forum – Gerald Clayton
- Pushing the World Away – Kenny Garrett
- Out Here – Christian McBride Trio

Best Large Jazz Ensemble Album

- Night in Calisia – Randy Brecker, Włodek Pawlik Trio & Kalisz Philharmonic
- Brooklyn Babylon – Darcy James Argue's Secret Society
- Wild Beauty – Brussels Jazz Orchestra featuring Joe Lovano
- March Sublime – Alan Ferber
- Intrada – Dave Slonaker Big Band

Best Latin Jazz Album

- Song for Maura – Paquito D'Rivera and Trio Corrente
- La Noche Más Larga – Buika
- Yo – Roberto Fonseca
- Egg_n – Omar Sosa
- Latin Jazz-Jazz Latin – Wayne Wallace Latin Jazz Quintet

=== Gospel/Contemporary Christian ===
Best Gospel/Contemporary Christian Music Performance

- "Break Every Chain" (Live) – Tasha Cobbs
- "Hurricane" – Natalie Grant
- "Lord, I Need You" – Matt Maher
- "If He Did It Before... Same God" (Live) – Tye Tribbett
- "Overcomer" – Mandisa

Best Gospel Song

- "If He Did It Before... Same God" (Live)
  - Tye Tribbett, songwriter (Tye Tribbett)
- "Deitrick Haddon"
  - Calvin Frazier & Deitrick Haddon, songwriters (Deitrick Haddon)
- "If I Believe"
  - Wirlie Morris, Michael Paran, Charlie Wilson & Mahin Wilson, songwriters (Charlie Wilson)
- "A Little More Jesus"
  - Erica Campbell and Tina Campbell & Warryn Campbell, songwriters (Erica Campbell)
- "Still"
  - Percy Bady, songwriter (Percy Bady featuring Lowell Pye)

Best Contemporary Christian Music Song

- "Overcomer"
  - David Garcia, Ben Glover & Christopher Stevens, songwriters (Mandisa)
- "Hurricane"
  - Matt Bronleewe, Natalie Grant & Cindy Morgan, songwriters (Natalie Grant)
- "Love Take Me Over"
  - Steven Curtis Chapman, songwriter (Steven Curtis Chapman)
- "Speak Life"
  - Toby McKeehan, Jamie Moore & Ryan Stevenson, songwriters (Tobymac)
- "Whom Shall I Fear (God of Angel Armies)"
  - Ed Cash, Scott Cash & Chris Tomlin, songwriters (Chris Tomlin)
- "In God's Time" – Tehrah

Best Gospel Album

- Greater Than (Live) – Tye Tribbett
- Grace (Live) – Tasha Cobbs
- Best For Last: 20 Year Celebration Vol. 1 (Live) – Donald Lawrence
- Best Days Yet – Bishop Paul S. Morton
- God Chaser (Live) – William Murphy

Best Contemporary Christian Music Album

- Overcomer – Mandisa
- We Won't Be Shaken – Building 429
- All the People Said Amen (Live) – Matt Maher
- Your Grace Finds Me (Live) – Matt Redman
- Burning Lights – Chris Tomlin

=== Latin ===
Best Latin Pop Album

- Vida – Draco Rosa
- Faith, Hope y Amor – Frankie J
- Viajero Frecuente – Ricardo Montaner
- Syntek – Aleks Syntek
- 12 Historias – Tommy Torres

Best Latin Rock Urban or Alternative Album

- Treinta Días – La Santa Cecilia
- El Objeto Antes Llamado Disco – Café Tacuba
- Ojo Por Ojo – El Tri
- Chances – Illya Kuryaki and the Valderramas
- Repeat After Me – Los Amigos Invisibles

Best Regional Mexican Music Album (Including Tejano)

- A Mi Manera – Mariachi Divas de Cindy Shea
- El Free – Banda Los Recoditos
- En Peligro De Extinción – Intocable
- Romeo y Su Nieta – Paquita la del Barrio
- 13 Celebrando El 13 – Joan Sebastian

Best Tropical Latin Album

- Pacific Mambo Orchestra – Pacific Mambo Orchestra
- 3.0 – Marc Anthony
- Como Te Voy A Olvidar – Los Angeles Azules
- Sergio George Presents Salsa Giants – Various Artists
- Corazón Profundo – Carlos Vives

=== Americana Music ===
Best American Roots Song

- "Love Has Come For You"
  - Edie Brickell & Steve Martin, songwriters (Steve Martin & Edie Brickell)
- "Build Me Up From Bones"
  - Sarah Jarosz, songwriter (Sarah Jarosz)
- "Invisible"
  - Steve Earle, songwriter (Steve Earle & The Dukes (& Duchesses))
- "Keep Your Dirty Lights On"
  - Tim O'Brien & Darrell Scott, songwriters (Tim O'Brien and Darrell Scott)
- "Shrimp Po-Boy, Dressed"
  - Allen Toussaint, songwriter (Allen Toussaint)

Best Americana Album

- Old Yellow Moon — Emmylou Harris & Rodney Crowell
- Love Has Come for You — Steve Martin & Edie Brickell
- Buddy and Jim — Buddy Miller and Jim Lauderdale
- One True Vine — Mavis Staples
- Songbook — Allen Toussaint

Best Bluegrass Album

- The Streets of Baltimore — Del McCoury Band
- It's Just a Road — The Boxcars
- Brothers of the Highway — Dailey & Vincent
- This World Oft Can Be — Della Mae
- Three Chords and the Truth — James King

Best Blues Album

- Get Up! — Ben Harper With Charlie Musselwhite
- Remembering Little Walter — Billy Boy Arnold, Charlie Musselwhite, Mark Hummel, Sugar Ray Norcia & James Harman
- Cotton Mouth Man — James Cotton
- Seesaw — Beth Hart with Joe Bonamassa
- Down In Louisiana — Bobby Rush

Best Folk Album

- My Favorite Picture of You — Guy Clark
- Sweetheart of the Sun — The Greencards
- Build Me Up from Bones — Sarah Jarosz
- The Ash & Clay — The Milk Carton Kids
- They All Played for Us: Arhoolie Records 50th Anniversary Celebration — Various Artists; Chris Strachwitz, producer

Best Regional Roots Music Album

- Dockside Sessions — Terrance Simien & The Zydeco Experience
- The Life & Times Of...The Hot 8 Brass Band — Hot 8 Brass Band
- Hula Ku'i — Kahulanui
- Le Fou — Zachary Richard
- Apache & Crown Dance Songs — Joe Tohonnie Jr.

=== Reggae ===
Best Reggae Album

- Ziggy Marley In Concert – Ziggy Marley
- Reincarnated – Snoop Lion
- One Love, One Life – Beres Hammond
- The Messiah – Sizzla
- Reggae Connection – Sly & Robbie and the Jam Masters

=== World Music ===
Best World Music Album

- Savor Flamenco – Gipsy Kings
- Live: Singing for Peace Around the World – Ladysmith Black Mambazo (tie)
- No Place for My Dream – Femi Kuti
- The Living Room Sessions Part 2 – Ravi Shankar

=== Children's ===
Best Children's Album

- Throw a Penny in the Wishing Well – Jennifer Gasoi
- Blue Clouds – Elizabeth Mitchell & You Are My Flower
- The Mighty Sky – Beth Nielsen Chapman
- Recess – Justin Roberts
- Singing Our Way Through: Songs for the World's Bravest Kids – Alastair Moock & Friends

=== Spoken Word ===
Best Spoken Word Album (Includes Poetry, Audio Books & Story Telling)

- America Again: Re-becoming The Greatness We Never Weren't – Stephen Colbert
- Carrie and Me – Carol Burnett
- Let's Explore Diabetes with Owls – David Sedaris
- Still Foolin' 'Em – Billy Crystal
- The Storm King – Pete Seeger

=== Comedy ===
Best Comedy Album

- Calm Down Gurrl – Kathy Griffin
- I'm Here to Help – Craig Ferguson
- A Little Unprofessional – Ron White
- Live – Tig Notaro
- That's What I'm Talkin' About – Bob Saget

=== Musical Show ===
Best Musical Theater Album

- Kinky Boots
  - Billy Porter & Stark Sands, principal soloists; Sammy James Jr., Cyndi Lauper, Stephen Oremus & William Wittman, producers; Cyndi Lauper, composer & lyricist (Original Broadway Cast)
- Matilda the Musical
  - Bertie Carvel, Sophia Gennusa, Laurence, Bailey Ryon, Miley Shapiro & Lauren Ward, principal soloists; Michael Croiter, Van Dean & Chris Nightingale, producers; Tim Minchin, composer & lyricist (Original Broadway Cast)
- Motown: The Musical
  - Brandon Victor Dixon & Valisia Lakae, principal soloists; Frank Filipetti & Ethan Popp, producers (Robert Bateman, Al Cleveland, Georgia Dobbins, Lamont Dozier, William Garrett, Marvin Gaye, Berry Gordy, Freddie Gorman, Cornelius Grant, Brian Holland, Ivy Jo Hunter, Michael Lovesmith, Alphonzo Mizell, Freddie Perren, Deke Richards, William Stevenson, Norman Whitfield & Stevie Wonder, composers; Nickolas Ashford, Marvin Gaye, Berry Gordy, Lula Mae Hardaway, Eddie Holland, Michael Lovesmith, Deke Richards, Smokey Robinson, Barrett Strong, Ronald White, Stevie Wonder & Syreeta Wright, lyricists) (Original Broadway Cast)

=== Music for Visual Media ===
Best Compilation Soundtrack for Visual Media

- Sound City: Real to Reel – Dave Grohl & Various Artists
- Django Unchained – Various Artists
- The Great Gatsby (Deluxe Edition) – Various Artists
- Les Misérables (Deluxe Edition) – Various Artists
- Muscle Shoals – Various Artists

Best Score Soundtrack for Visual Media

- Skyfall
  - Thomas Newman, composer
- Argo
  - Alexandre Desplat, composer
- The Great Gatsby
  - Craig Armstrong, composer
- Life of Pi
  - Mychael Danna, composer
- Lincoln
  - John Williams, composer
- Zero Dark Thirty
  - Alexandre Desplat, composer

Best Song Written for Visual Media

- "Skyfall" (from Skyfall)
  - Adele Adkins & Paul Epworth, songwriters (Adele)
- "Atlas" (from The Hunger Games: Catching Fire)
  - Guy Berryman, Jonny Buckland, Will Champion & Chris Martin, songwriters (Coldplay)
- "Silver Lining (Crazy 'Bout You)" (from Silver Linings Playbook)
  - Diane Warren, songwriter (Jessie J)
- "We Both Know" (from Safe Haven)
  - Colbie Caillat & Gavin DeGraw, songwriters (Colbie Caillat featuring Gavin DeGraw)
- "Young and Beautiful" (from The Great Gatsby)
  - Lana Del Rey & Rick Nowels, songwriters (Lana Del Rey)
- "You've Got Time" (from Orange Is the New Black)
  - Regina Spektor, songwriter (Regina Spektor)

=== Composing/Arranging ===
Best Instrumental Composition

- "Pensamientos For Solo Alto Saxophone And Chamber Orchestra"
  - Clare Fischer, composer (The Clare Fischer Orchestra)
- " Away"
  - Chuck Owen, composer (Chuck Owen & The Jazz Surge)
- "California Pictures For String Quartet"
  - Gordon Goodwin, composer (Quartet San Francisco)
- "Koko On The Boulevard"
  - Scott Healy, composer (Scott Healy Ensemble)
- "String Quartet No. 1: Funky Diversion In Three Parts"
  - Vince Mendoza, composer (Quartet San Francisco)

Best Instrumental Arrangement

- "On Green Dolphin Street"
  - Gordon Goodwin, arranger (Gordon Goodwin's Big Phat Band)
- "Invitation"
  - Kim Richmond, arranger (The Kim Richmond Concert Jazz Orchestra)
- "Side Hikes – A Ridge Away"
  - Chuck Owen, arranger (Chuck Owen & The Jazz Surge)
- "Skylark"
  - Nan Schwartz, arranger (Amy Dickson)
- "Wild Beauty"
  - Gil Goldstein, arranger (Brussels Jazz Orchestra Featuring Joe Lovano)

Best Instrumental Arrangement Accompanying Vocalist(s)

- "Swing Low"
  - Gil Goldstein, arranger (Bobby McFerrin & Esperanza Spalding)
- "La Vida Nos Espera"
  - Nan Schwartz, arranger (Gian Marco)
- "Let's Fall In Love"
  - Chris Walden, arranger (Calabria Foti Featuring Seth MacFarlane)
- "The Moon's A Harsh Mistress"
  - John Hollenbeck, arranger (John Hollenbeck)
- "What A Wonderful World"
  - Shelly Berg, arranger (Gloria Estefan)

=== Crafts ===
Best Recording Package

- Long Night Moon
  - Sarah Dodds & Shauna Dodds, art directors (Reckless Kelly)
- Automatic Music Can Be Fun
  - Mike Brown, Zac Decamp, Brian Grunert & Annie Stoll, art directors (Geneseo)
- Magna Carta... Holy Grail
  - Brian Roettinger, art director (Jay-Z)
- Metallica Through The Never (Music From The Motion Picture)
  - Bruce Duckworth, Sarah Moffat & David Turner, art directors (Metallica)
- The Next Day
  - Jonathan Barnbrook, art director (David Bowie)

Best Boxed or Special Limited Edition Package

- Wings Over America (Deluxe Edition)
  - Simon Earith & James Musgrave, art directors (Paul McCartney and Wings)
- The Brussels Affair
  - Charles Dooher & Scott Sandler, art directors (The Rolling Stones)
- How Do You Do (Limited Edition Box Set)
  - Mayer Hawthorne, art director (Mayer Hawthorne)
- The Road To Red Rocks (Special Edition)
  - Ross Stirling, art director (Mumford & Sons)
- The Smith Tapes
  - Masaki Koike, art director (Various Artists)

Best Album Notes

- Afro Blue Impressions (Remastered & Expanded)
  - Neil Tesser, album notes writer (John Coltrane)
- Call It Art 1964–1965
  - Ben Young, album notes writer (New York Art Quartet)
- Electric Music for the Mind and Body
  - Alec Palao, album notes writer (Country Joe and the Fish)
- Stravinsky: Le Sacre Du Printemps
  - Jonathan Cott, album notes writer (Leonard Bernstein & New York Philharmonic)
- 360 Sound: The Columbia Records Story
  - Sean Wilentz, album notes writer (various artists)
- Work Hard, Play Hard, Pray Hard: Hard Time, Good Time & End Time Music, 1923–1936
  - Nathan Salsburg, album notes writer (various artists)

=== Historical ===
Best Historical Album

- Charlie Is My Darling – Ireland 1965 (tie)
  - Teri Landi, Andrew Loog Oldham & Steve Rosenthal, compilation producers; Bob Ludwig, mastering engineer (The Rolling Stones)
- The Complete Sussex And Columbia Albums (tie)
  - Leo Sacks, compilation producer; Joseph M. Palmaccio, Tom Ruff & Mark Wilder, mastering engineers (Bill Withers)
- Call It Art 1964–1965
  - Joe Lizzi & Ben Young, compilation producers; Steve Fallone, Joe Lizzi & Ben Young, mastering engineers (New York Art Quartet)
- Pictures Of Sound: One Thousand Years Of Educed Audio: 980–1980
  - Patrick Feaster & Steven Ledbetter, compilation producers; Michael Graves, mastering engineer (Various Artists)
- Wagner: Der Ring Des Nibelungen (Deluxe Edition)
  - Philip Siney, compilation producer; Ben Turner, mastering engineer (Sir Georg Solti)

=== Production ===
Best Engineered Album, Non-Classical

- Random Access Memories
  - Peter Franco, Mick Guzauski, Florian Lagatta & Daniel Lerner, engineers; Bob Ludwig, mastering engineer (Daft Punk)
- Annie Up
  - Chuck Ainlay, engineer; Bob Ludwig, mastering engineer (Pistol Annies)
- The Blue Room
  - Helik Hadar & Leslie Ann Jones, engineers; Bernie Grundman, mastering engineer (Madeleine Peyroux)
- The Devil Put Dinosaurs Here
  - Paul Figueroa & Randy Staub, engineers; Ted Jensen, mastering engineer (Alice in Chains)
- ...Like Clockwork
  - Joe Barresi & Mark Rankin, engineers; Gavin Lurssen, mastering engineer (Queens of the Stone Age)
- The Moorings
  - Trina Shoemaker, engineer; Eric Conn, mastering engineer (Andrew Duhon)

Producer of the Year, Non-Classical

- Pharrell Williams
  - "BBC" (Jay-Z)
  - "Blurred Lines" (Robin Thicke featuring T.I. & Pharrell)
  - "Happy" (Pharrell Williams)
  - "I Can't Describe (The Way I Feel)" (Jennifer Hudson featuring T.I.)
  - "Nuclear" (Destiny's Child)
  - "Oceans" (Jay-Z featuring Frank Ocean)
  - "Reach Out Richard" (Mayer Hawthorne)
  - "The Stars Are Ours" (Mayer Hawthorne)
- Rob Cavallo
  - All That Echoes (Josh Groban)
  - "Bright Lights" (Gary Clark Jr.)
  - ¡Dos! (Green Day)
  - "If I Loved You" (Delta Rae featuring Lindsey Buckingham)
  - "Love They Say" (Tegan and Sara)
  - "Things Are Changin'" (Gary Clark Jr.)
  - ¡Tré! (Green Day)
  - "When My Train Pulls In" (Gary Clark Jr.)
  - "You've Got Time" (Regina Spektor)
- Dr. Luke
  - Bounce It (Juicy J Featuring Wale & Trey Songz)
  - "Crazy Kids" (Kesha)
  - "Fall Down (will.i.am featuring Miley Cyrus)
  - "Give It 2 U" (Robin Thicke featuring Kendrick Lamar)
  - "Roar" (Katy Perry)
  - "Rock Me" (One Direction)
  - "Wrecking Ball" (Miley Cyrus)
  - "Play it Again" (Becky G)
- Ariel Rechtshaid
  - Days Are Gone (Haim)
  - "Everything Is Embarrassing" (Sky Ferreira)
  - "Lost in My Bedroom" (Sky Ferreira)
  - Modern Vampires of the City (Vampire Weekend)
  - Reincarnated (Snoop Lion)
  - True Romance (Charli XCX)
  - "You're No Good" (Major Lazer featuring Santigold, Vybz Kartel, Danielle Haim and Yasmin)
- Jeff Tweedy
  - The Invisible Way (Low)
  - One True Vine (Mavis Staples)
  - Wassaic Way (Sarah Lee Guthrie & Johnny Irion)

Best Remixed Recording, Non-Classical

- "Summertime Sadness" (Cedric Gervais Remix)
  - Cedric Gervais, remixer (Lana Del Rey)
- "Days Turn Into Nights" (Andy Caldwell Remix)
  - Andy Caldwell, remixer (Delerium featuring Michael Logen)
- "If I Lose Myself" (Alesso Vs. OneRepublic)
  - Alesso, remixer (OneRepublic)
- "Locked Out of Heaven" (Sultan + Ned Shepard Remix)
  - Sultan & Ned Shepard, remixers (Bruno Mars)
- "One Love/People Get Ready" (Photek Remix)
  - Rupert Parkes, remixer (Bob Marley and the Wailers)

=== Production, Surround Sound ===
Best Surround Sound Album

- Live Kisses
  - Al Schmitt, surround mix engineer; Tommy LiPuma, surround producer (Paul McCartney)
- Sailing the Seas of Cheese (Deluxe Edition)
  - Les Claypool & Jason Mills, surround mix engineers; Stephen Marcussen, surround mastering engineer; Les Claypool & Jeff Fura, surround producers (Primus)
- Signature Sound Opus One
  - Leslie Ann Jones, surround mix engineer; Michael Romanowski, surround mastering engineer; Herbert Waltl, surround producer (various artists)
- Sixteen Sunsets
  - Jim Anderson, surround mix engineer; Darcy Proper, surround mastering engineer; Jim Anderson & Jane Ira Bloom, surround producers (Jane Ira Bloom)
- Sprung Rhythm
  - Daniel Shores, surround mix engineer; Daniel Shores, surround mastering engineer; Dan Merceruio, surround producer (Richard Scerbo & Inscape)

=== Production, Classical ===
Best Engineered Album, Classical

- Winter Morning Walks
  - David Frost, Brian Losch & Tim Martyn, engineers; Tim Martyn, mastering engineer (Dawn Upshaw, Maria Schneider, Australian Chamber Orchestra & Saint Paul Chamber Orchestra)
- Hymn to the Virgin
  - Morten Lindberg, engineer (Tone Bianca, Sparre Dahl, & Schola Cantorum)
- La Voie Triomphale
  - Morten Lindberg, engineer (Ole Kristian Ruud & Staff Band of the Norwegian Armed Forces)
- Roomful of Teeth
  - Mark Donahue & Jesse Lewis, engineers (Brad Wells & Roomful of Teeth)
- Vinci: Artaserse
  - Hans-Martin Renz, Wolfgang Rixius & Ulrich Ruscher, engineers (Diego Fasolis, Philippe Jaroussky, Max Emanuel Cenčić, Daniel Behle, Franco Fagioli, Valer Barna-Sabadus, Yuriy Mynenko & Concerto Köln)

Producer of the Year, Classical

- David Frost
  - Andres: Home Stretch (Timo Andres, Andrew Cyr & Metropolis Ensemble)
  - Angel Heart, A Music Storybook (Matt Haimovitz & Uccello)
  - Beethoven: Piano Sonatas, Vol. 2 (Jonathan Biss)
  - Ben-Haim: Chamber Works (ARC Ensemble)
  - Celebrating The American Spirit (Judith Clurman & Essential Voices USA)
  - Elgar: Enigma Variations; Vaughan Williams: The Wasps; Greensleeves (Michael Stern & Kansas City Symphony)
  - Guilty Pleasures (Renée Fleming, Sebastian Lang-Lessing & Philharmonia Orchestra)
  - Verdi: Otello (Riccardo Muti, Aleksandrs Antonenko, Krassimira Stoyanova, Carlo Guelfi, Chicago Symphony Chorus & Chicago Symphony Orchestra)
  - Winter Morning Walks (Dawn Upshaw, Maria Schneider, Australian Chamber Orchestra & St. Paul Chamber Orchestra)
- Manfred Eicher
  - Beethoven: Diabelli-Variationen (András Schiff)
  - Canto Oscuro (Anna Gourari)
  - Pärt: Adam's Lament (Tõnu Kaljuste, Latvian Radio Choir, Vox Clamantis, Sinfonietta Riga, Estonian Philharmonic Chamber Choir & Tallinn Chamber Orchestra)
  - Tabakova: String Paths (Maxim Rysanov)
- Marina A. Ledin, Victor Ledin
  - Bizet: Symphony In C; Jeux D'Enfants; Variations Chromatiques (Martin West & San Francisco Ballet Orchestra)
  - Traveling Sonata – European Music For Flute & Guitar (Viviana Guzmán & Jérémy Jouve)
  - Voyages (Conrad Tao)
  - Zia (Del Sol String Quartet)
- James Mallinson
  - Berlioz: Grande Messe Des Morts (Colin Davis, London Symphony Chorus, London Philharmonic Choir & London Symphony Orchestra)
  - Bloch: Symphony In C-Sharp Minor & Poems Of The Sea (Dalia Atlas & London Symphony Orchestra)
  - Fauré: Requiem; Bach: Partita, Chorales & Ciaccona (Nigel Short, Tenebrae & London Symphony Orchestra Chamber Ensemble)
  - Nielsen: Symphonies Nos. 2 & 3 (Colin Davis & London Symphony Orchestra)
  - Wagner: Das Rheingold (Valery Gergiev, René Pape, Stephan Rügamer, Nikolai Putilin & Mariinsky Orchestra)
  - Wagner: Die Walküre (Valery Gergiev, Anja Kampe, Jonas Kaufmann, René Pape, Nina Stemme & Mariinsky Orchestra)
  - Weber: Der Freischütz (Colin Davis, Christine Brewer, Sally Matthews, Simon O'Neill, London Symphony Chorus & London Symphony Orchestra)
- Jay David Saks
  - Adams: Nixon in China (John Adams, Russell Braun, Ginger Costa-Jackson, James Maddalena, Janis Kelly, Richard Paul Fink, Robert Brubaker, Kathleen Kim, Metropolitan Opera Chorus and Orchestra)
  - Adès: The Tempest (Thomas Adès, Audrey Luna, Isabel Leonard, Alan Oke, Simon Keenlyside, Metropolitan Opera Chorus & Orchestra)
  - The Enchanted Island (William Christie, Joyce DiDonato, David Daniels, Danielle De Niese, Luca Pisaroni, Lisette Oropesa, Plácido Domingo, Metropolitan Opera Orchestra & Chorus)
  - Handel: Rodelinda (Harry Bicket, Renée Fleming, Andreas Scholl, Joseph Kaiser, Stephanie Blythe, Iestyn Davies, Shenyang & The Metropolitan Opera Orchestra)
  - Live At Carnegie Hall (James Levine, Evgeny Kissin & The Metropolitan Opera Orchestra)
  - Verdi: Rigoletto (Michele Mariotti, Željko Lučić, Diana Damrau, Piotr Beczała, Oksana Volkova, Štefan Kocán, The Metropolitan Opera Orchestra & Chorus)

=== Classical ===
Best Orchestral Performance

- Sibelius: Symphonies Nos. 1 & 4
  - Osmo Vänskä (conductor), Minnesota Orchestra
- Atterberg: Orchestral Works Vol. 1
  - Neeme Järvi (conductor), Gothenburg Symphony Orchestra
- Lutoslawski: Symphony No. 1
  - Esa-Pekka Salonen (conductor), Los Angeles Philharmonic
- Schumann: Symphony No. 2; Overtures Manfred & Genoveva
  - Claudio Abbado (conductor), Orchestra Mozart
- Stravinsky: Le Sacre du Printemps
  - Simon Rattle (conductor), Berliner Philharmoniker

Best Opera Recording

- Adès: The Tempest
  - Thomas Adès (conductor); Simon Keenlyside, Isabel Leonard, Audrey Luna, Alan Oke (soloists); Luisa Bricetti and Victoria Warivonchick (producers)
- Britten: The Rape of Lucretia
  - Oliver Knussen (conductor); Ian Bostridge, Peter Coleman-Wright, Susan Gritton, Angelika Kirchschlager (soloists); John Fraser (producer)
- Kleiberg: David and Bathsheba
  - Tõnu Kaljuste (conductor); Anna Eimarsson and Johannes Weisser (soloists); Morten Lindberg (producer)
- Vinci: Artaserse
  - Diego Fasolis (conductor); Valer Barna-Sabadus, Daniel Behle, Max Emanuel Cenčić, Franco Fagioli, Philippe Jaroussky (soloists); Ulrich Russcher (producer)
- Wagner: Der Ring des Nibelungen
  - Christian Thielemann (conductor); Katarina Dalayman, Albert Dohmen, Stephen Gould, Eric Halfvarson, Linda Watson (soloists); Ohmar Eichinger (producer)

Best Choral Performance

Performers who are not eligible for an award (such as orchestras, soloists or choirs) are mentioned in parentheses

- Pärt: Adam's Lament
  - Tõnu Kaljuste (conductor) (with Tui Hirv & Rainer Vilu; Estonian Philharmonic Chamber Choir; Sinfonietta Riga & Tallinn Chamber Orchestra; Latvian Radio Choir & Vox Clamantis)
- Berlioz: Grande Messe de Morts
  - Colin Davis (conductor) (with Barry Banks, London Symphony Orchestra, London Philharmonic Choir and London Symphony Chorus)
- Parry: Works for Chorus & Orchestra
  - Neeme Järvi (conductor), Adrian Partington (chorus master) (with Amanda Roocroft, BBC National Orchestra of Wales and BBC National Chorus of Wales)
- Whitbourn: Annelies
  - James Jordan (conductor) (with Arianna Zukerman, The Lincoln Trio and the Westminster Williamson Voices)
- Palestrina: Volume 3
  - Harry Christophers (conductor) (with The Sixteen)

Best Chamber Music/Small Ensemble Performance

- Roomful of Teeth
  - Brad Wells & Roomful of Teeth
- Beethoven: Violin Sonatas
  - Leonidas Kavakos & Enrico Pace
- Cage: The 10,000 Things
  - Vicki Ray, William Winant, Aron Kallay & Tom Peters
- Duo
  - Hélène Grimaud & Sol Gabetta
- Times Go By Turns
  - New York Polyphony

Best Classical Instrumental Solo

- Corigliano: Conjurer – Concerto for Percussionist & String Orchestra
  - Evelyn Glennie (soloist), David Alan Miller (conductor)
- Bartók, Eötvös & Ligeti
  - Patricia Kopatchinskaja (soloist), Peter Eötvös (conductor)
- The Edge of Light
  - Gloria Cheng
- Lindberg: Piano Concerto No. 2
  - Yefim Bronfman (soloist), Alan Gilbert (conductor)
- Salonen: Violin Concerto; Nyx
  - Leila Josefowicz (soloist), Esa-Pekka Salonen (conductor)
- Schubert: Piano Sonatas D. 845 & D. 960
  - Maria João Pires

Best Classical Vocal Solo

- Winter Morning Walks
  - Dawn Upshaw
- Drama Queens
  - Joyce DiDonato
- Mission
  - Cecilia Bartoli
- Schubert: Winterreise
  - Christoph Prégardien
- Wagner
  - Jonas Kaufmann

Best Classical Compendium

- Hindemith: Violinkonzert; Symphonic; Konzertmusik
  - Christoph Eschenbach (conductor)
- Holmboe: Concerto
  - Dima Slobodeniouk (conductor), Preben Iwan (producer)
- Tabakova: String Paths
  - Maxim Rysanov (conductor), Manfred Eicher (producer)

Best Classical Contemporary Composition

- Winter Morning Walks
  - Maria Schneider
- Piano Concerto No. 2
  - Magnus Lindberg
- Adam's Lament
  - Arvo Pärt
- Violin Concerto
  - Esa-Pekka Salonen
- Partita for 8 Voices
  - Caroline Shaw

=== Music Video/Film ===
Best Music Video

- "Suit & Tie" – Justin Timberlake & Jay-Z
  - David Fincher, video director; Timory King, video producer
- "Safe and Sound" – Capital Cities
  - Grady Hall, video director; Buddy Enright, video producer; Daniel Weisman, video producer; Danny Lockwood, video producer
- "Picasso Baby: A Performance Art Film" – Jay-Z
  - Mark Romanek, video director; Shawn Carter & Aristides McGarry, video producers
- "Can't Hold Us" – Macklemore & Ryan Lewis featuring Ray Dalton
  - Jon Jon Augustavo, Jason Koenig & Ryan Lewis, video directors; Tricia Davis, Honna Kimmerer & Jenny Koenig, video producers
- "I'm Shakin'" – Jack White
  - Dori Oskowitz, video director; Raquel Costello, video producer

Best Music Film

- Live Kisses – Paul McCartney
  - Jonas Åkerlund, video director; Violaine Etienne, Aron Levine & Scott Rodger, video producers
- Live 2012 – Coldplay
  - Paul Dugdale, video director; Jim Parsons, video producer
- ¡Cuatro! – Green Day
  - Tim Wheeler, video director; Tim Lynch, video producer
- I'm in I'm out and I'm Gone: The Making of Get Up! – Ben Harper with Charlie Musselwhite
  - Danny Clinch, video director; Ben Harper, video producer
- The Road to Red Rocks – Mumford & Sons
  - Nicolas Jack Davies & Frederick Scott, video directors; Dan Bowen, video producer

== Special Merit Awards ==
=== MusiCares Person of the Year ===
- Carole King

=== Lifetime Achievement Award ===
- The Beatles
- Clifton Chenier
- The Isley Brothers
- Kraftwerk
- Kris Kristofferson
- Armando Manzanero
- Maud Powell

=== Trustees Award ===
- Rick Hall
- Jim Marshall
- Ennio Morricone

=== Technical Grammy Award ===
- Emile Berliner
- Lexicon

=== Music Educator Award ===
- Kent Knappenberger (of Westfield Academy and Central School in Westfield, New York)

== Grammy Hall of Fame inductions ==
Title	Artist	Record label	Year of release	Genre	Format
After the Gold Rush	Neil Young and Crazy Horse	Reprise	1970	Folk Rock	Album
All Things Must Pass	George Harrison	Apple	1970	Rock	Album
The Chicago Transit Authority	Chicago	Columbia	1969	Progressive Rock	Album
Cosmo's Factory	Creedence Clearwater Revival	Fantasy	1970	Rock	Album
Doc Watson	Doc Watson	Vanguard	1964	Folk	Album
"Fortunate Son"	Creedence Clearwater Revival	Fantasy	1969	Rock	Single
"Georgia on My Mind"	Hoagy Carmichael & his Orchestra (featuring Bix Beiderbecke on Cornet)	Victor	1930	Jazz	Single
"Get Up (I Feel Like Being a) Sex Machine"	James Brown	King	1970	Funk	Single
"Honky Tonk Women"	The Rolling Stones	London	1969	Hard Rock	Single
"Jolene"	Dolly Parton	RCA Nashville	1973	Country Pop	Single
The Joshua Tree	U2	Island	1987	Rock	Album
Kristofferson	Kris Kristofferson	Monument	1970	Country	Album
"Low Rider"	War	United Artists	1975	Funk	Single
Mary Poppins	Cast including Julie Andrews, Dick Van Dyke, David Tomlinson, Karen Dotrice, Matthew Garber and others	Walt Disney	1964	Soundtrack	Album
"Nobody Knows the Trouble I've Seen"	Louis Armstrong	Decca	1938	Negro Spiritual	Single
"Raindrops Keep Fallin' on My Head"	B. J. Thomas	Scepter	1969	Easy Listening	Single
"Rapper's Delight"	The Sugarhill Gang	Sugar Hill	1979	Old-school hip hop	Single
Relaxin' with the Miles Davis Quintet	Miles Davis & his Quintet	Prestige	1958	Jazz	Album
"The Revolution Will Not Be Televised"	Gil Scott-Heron	Flying Dutchman	1971	Funk	Single
"Strange Things Happening Every Day"	Sister Rosetta Tharpe	Decca	1944	Negro Spiritual	Single
"Sweet Home Chicago"	Robert Johnson	Vocalion	1936	Blues	Single
"3 O'Clock Blues"	B.B. King	RPM	1951	R&B	Single
"Under the Boardwalk"	The Drifters	Atlantic	1964	Pop	Single
"Walk This Way"	Run-D.M.C. featuring Aerosmith	Profile	1986	Rap Rock	Single
"(What a) Wonderful World"	Sam Cooke	Keen	1960	R&B	Single
Woodstock: Music from the Original Soundtrack and More	Various Artists including John Sebastian, Joan Baez, and Crosby, Stills, Nash & Young	Cotillion	1970	Soundtrack	Album
"Yardbird Suite"	Charlie Parker & his Septet	Dial	1946	Bebop	Single

== In Memoriam ==
The following people appeared in the In Memoriam segment:

- Van Cliburn
- George Jones
- Ray Price
- Eydie Gormé
- Annette Funicello
- Richie Havens
- Ray Manzarek
- Alvin Lee
- Dennis Frederiksen
- Andy Johns
- Sid Bernstein
- Al Coury
- Marian McPartland
- Cedar Walton
- Gloria Lynne
- George Duke
- Bebo Valdés
- Chico Hamilton
- Donald Shirley
- Colin Davis
- Stanley Solow
- Bobby Bland
- Morris Holt
- Larry Monroe
- Chris Kelly
- Lord Infamous
- Junior Murvin
- Hugh McCracken
- Ricky Lawson
- Mike Shipley
- Tompall Glaser
- Jack Greene
- Cowboy Jack Clement
- Slim Whitman
- Jody Payne
- Steven Fromholz
- Mindy McCready
- Jim Foglesong
- Sherman Halsey
- JJ Cale
- Peter Rauhofer
- Chi Cheng
- Chet Flippo
- Paul Williams (Crawdaddy! creator)
- Steve Jones
- Marvin Junior
- Bobby Smith
- Deke Richards
- Cordell Mosson
- Bobby Martin
- Jerry Boulding
- George Beverly Shea
- Cleotha Staples
- Patti Webster
- Phil Ramone
- Polly Anthony
- Mel Ilberman
- Jules Kurz
- Donald Engel
- Jonathan Winters
- Tony Sheridan
- Jerry G. Bishop
- Larry Lujack
- Sara Montiel
- Oralia Domínguez
- Juan Carlos Calderón
- Risë Stevens
- János Starker
- Claudio Abbado
- Yusef Lateef
- Donald Byrd
- Roy Campbell Jr.
- Cory Monteith
- Randy Ostin
- Milt Olin
- Ed Shaughnessy
- Al Porcino
- Norman Winter
- Oscar Castro-Neves
- Jim Hall
- Frank Wess
- Ray Dolby
- Amar Bose
- Mort Nasatir
- Lou Reed
- Alan Myers
- Phil Everly

== Artists with multiple wins and nominations ==
The following artists received multiple nominations:

- Nine: Jay-Z
- Seven: Kendrick Lamar, Macklemore & Ryan Lewis, Justin Timberlake, Pharrell Williams
- Five: Daft Punk, Drake, Bob Ludwig
- Four: Lorde, Bruno Mars, Kacey Musgraves, Taylor Swift,
- Three: Jeff Bhasker, Black Sabbath, Tamar Braxton, Fantasia, Peter Franco, Dave Grohl, Mick Guzauski, Florian Lagatta, Daniel Lerner, Manny Marroquin, Charlie Musselwhite, Nile Rodgers, Robin Thicke, Tye Tribbett, Tehrah
- Two: Jessi Alexander, Sara Bareilles, Mary J. Blige, David Bowie, Edie Brickell, Rob Caggiano, Gary Clark Jr., Tasha Cobbs, Coldplay, Ray Dalton, Lana Del Rey, Alexandre Desplat, Dr. Luke, Natalie Grant, Dave Grohl, Anthony Hamilton, Ben Harper, Connie Harrington, Calvin Harris, Imagine Dragons, Sarah Jarosz, Kaskade, Mary Lambert, Led Zeppelin, Ari Levine, Joel Little, Matt Maher, Mandisa, Max Martin, Steve Martin, Shane McAnally, Paul McCartney, Tim McGraw, Miguel, Katy Perry, P!nk, Gregory Porter, Queens of the Stone Age, Rihanna, Nate Ruess, Noah Shebib, Ed Sheeran, Blake Shelton, T.I., Timbaland, Chris Tomlin, Allen Toussaint, Wanz, Kanye West, Jack White

The following artists received multiple awards:

- Five: Daft Punk
- Four: Bob Ludwig, Macklemore & Ryan Lewis, Pharrell Williams
- Three: Peter Franco, Mick Guzauski, Florian Lagatta, Daniel Lerner, Nile Rodgers, Justin Timberlake
- Two: David Frost, Dave Grohl, Jay-Z, Lorde, Paul McCartney, Kacey Musgraves, Tye Tribbett

== Live-GIFs ==
The 56th Annual Grammy Awards were the first in the show's history to incorporate comprehensive Live-GIF integration through Tumblr. Creative agency Deckhouse Digital was hired to facilitate the integration, producing more than 50 animated GIFs during the live broadcast and publishing them to the official Grammy tumblr page in real time. The images contributed to the more than 5.1 million reblogs and likes that Grammy related posts received on the blogging site, and the record breaking 34 million combined social media interactions related to the live broadcast.
