= Hal Galper =

American jazz musician (1938–2025)

- Born: April 18, 1938; Salem, Massachusetts, U.S.
- Died: July 18, 2025 (aged 87) Cochecton, New York, U.S.
- Genres: Jazz
- Occupation: Musician
- Instrument: Piano
- Website: www.halgalper.com

Harold Galper (April 18, 1938 – July 18, 2025) was an American jazz pianist, composer, arranger, bandleader, educator, and writer.

== Life and career ==
Galper was born in Salem, Massachusetts, United States on April 18, 1938. Galper studied classical piano as a boy, but switched to jazz which he studied at the Berklee College of Music from 1955 to 1958. He hung out at Herb Pomeroy's club, the Stable, hearing local Boston musicians such as Jaki Byard, Alan Dawson and Sam Rivers. Galper started sitting in and became the house pianist at the Stable and later on, at Connelly's and Lenny's on the Turnpike. He went on to work in Pomeroy's band.

Later on he worked with Chet Baker and Stan Getz and accompanied vocalists Joe Williams, Anita O'Day, and Chris Connor.

In 1969, Galper recorded with Randy Brecker and Michael Brecker on Randy's Score album. Randy and Michael Brecker subsequently appeared on Galper's 1971 album The Guerilla Band and his 1972 album Wild Bird. Though he began recording albums under his own name in the 1970s, Galper continued to work for other bandleaders throughout the 1970s and 1980s, either as a full time band member, or on a freelance basis. He played with Stan Getz for a year starting in 1972, and in 1973, he joined the Cannonball Adderley Quintet, replacing George Duke and staying until 1975. Galper continued to work with Randy and Michael Brecker in the late 1970s, and the brothers appeared on Galper's 1977 album Reach Out! and the 1979 Speak With A Single Voice (reissued as Children of the Night), though by this point the Breckers were leading their fusion band The Brecker Brothers and did not work with Galper full time. Galper performed in New York and Chicago jazz clubs in the late 1970s, and recorded two albums with John Scofield for the Enja label in 1978-79, the first led by Scofield, and the second led by himself. From 1980 until 1990, he was a member of Phil Woods's quintet.

Galper left the Woods group in August 1990 to tour and record with a trio with Steve Ellington on drums. Initially, Todd Coolman was the trio's bass player. After Coolman left the trio, his permanent replacement was Jeff Johnson, though other bassists worked with Galper and Ellington for short periods until they joined with Johnson. From 1990 to 1999, his group was on the road six months a year.

He was internationally known as an educator. Galper was on the faculty of Purchase College and the New School for Jazz and Contemporary Music. His theoretical and practical articles appeared in six of Down Beat editions. His scholarly article on the psychology of stage fright, originally published in the Jazz Educators Journal, has subsequently been reprinted in four other publications.

Galper died in Cochecton, New York, on July 18, 2025, at the age of 87.

== Discography ==
=== As leader/co-leader ===
| Recording date | Title | Label | Year released | Notes / Personnel |
|---|---|---|---|---|
| 1971 | The Guerilla Band | Mainstream | 1971 | Randy Brecker (trumpet, electric trumpet, flugelhorn), Michael Brecker (tenor sax, soprano sax), Bob Mann (electric guitar), Victor Gaskin (bass guitar), Charles Alias and Steve Haas (drums) |
| 1971? | Wild Bird | Mainstream | 1972 | Randy Brecker (trumpet, electric trumpet), Michael Brecker (tenor sax, soprano sax), Jonathan Graham (electric guitar), Bob Mann (electric guitar), Victor Gaskin, Charles LaChappelle (double bass, bass guitar), Bill Goodwin (drums), Billy Hart (drums) |
| 1972? | Inner Journey | Mainstream | 1973 | Trio, Dave Holland (double bass), Bill Goodwin (drums) |
| 1975–11 | Windows | SteepleChase | 1976 | Co-led duo with Lee Konitz (alto sax) |
| 1976–11 | Reach Out! | SteepleChase | 1977 | Quintet, Randy Brecker (trumpet), Michael Brecker (tenor sax, flute), Wayne Dockery (bass), Billy Hart (drums) |
| 1977–02 | Now Hear This | Enja | 1977 | Quartet, Terumasa Hino (trumpet), Cecil McBee (bass), Tony Williams (drums) |
| 1978–02 | Redux '78 | Concord Jazz | 1991 | Live. Quintet, Randy Brecker (trumpet), Michael Brecker (tenor sax, flute), Wayne Dockery (bass), Bob Moses (drums). |
| 1978–02 | Speak with a Single Voice | Enja | 1979 | Live. Quintet, Randy Brecker (trumpet), Michael Brecker (tenor sax, flute), Wayne Dockery (bass), Bob Moses (drums). |
| 1979–10, 1979–11 | Ivory Forest | Enja | 1980 | Quartet, John Scofield (guitar), Wayne Dockery (bass), Adam Nussbaum (drums) |
| 1982–01 | Naturally | Blackhawk | 1987 | Live. Trio, Rufus Reid (bass), Victor Lewis (drums). |
| 1986–03 | Dreamsville | Enja | 1987 | Trio, Steve Gilmore (bass), Bill Goodwin (drums) |
| 1986–11 | Miss Oidipus | Dragon | 1987 | Co-led with Putte Wickman (clarinet) and trio, Steve Gilmore (bass), Bill Goodwin (drums) |
| 1989–02 | Portrait | Concord Jazz | 1989 | Trio, Ray Drummond (bass), Billy Hart (drums) |
| 1990–07 | Live at Maybeck Recital Hall, Volume Six | Concord Jazz | 1990 | Live. Solo. |
| 1990–11 | Invitation to a Concert | Concord Jazz | 1991 | Trio, Todd Coolman (bass), Steve Ellington (drums) |
| 1991–07 | Live at Port Townsend '91 | Double-Time | 1991 | Live. Trio, Todd Coolman (bass), Steve Ellington (drums). |
| 1992–11 | Tippin' | Concord Jazz | 1993 | Trio, Wayne Dockery (bass), Steve Ellington (drums) |
| 1993–09 | Just Us | Enja | 1994 | With Jerry Bergonzi (tenor sax) and trio, Pat O'Leary (bass), Steve Ellington (drums) |
| 1994–08 | Live at Vartan Jazz | Vartan Jazz | 1994 | Live. Trio, Jeff Johnson (bass), Steve Ellington (drums). |
| 1994–08 | Rebob | Enja | 1995 | With Jerry Bergonzi (tenor sax) and trio, Jeff Johnson (bass), Steve Ellington (drums) |
| 1996–03 | Maybeck Duets | Philology | 1998 | Co-led duo with Jeff Johnson (bass) |
| 1997–01 | Sweet Beat Blues | Red | 1998 | Co-led with Carlo Atti (tenor sax) and trio, Jeff Johnson (bass), Steve Ellington (drums) |
| 1997–02 | Fugue State | Blue Chip Jazz | 1998 | Trio, Jeff Johnson (bass), Steve Ellington (drums) |
| 1999–02 | Let's Call This That | Double-Time | 1999 | Quintet, Jeff Johnson (bass), Steve Ellington (drums), Jerry Bergonzi (tenor sax), Tim Hagans (trumpet) |
| 2006–04 | Agents of Change | Fabola | 2006 | Trio, Tony Marino (bass), Billy Mintz (drums) |
| 2006–06 | Furious Rubato | Origin | 2007 | Co-led trio, Jeff Johnson (bass), John Bishop (drums) |
| 2008–02 | Art-Work | Origin | 2009 | Co-led trio, Reggie Workman (bass), Rashied Ali (drums) |
| 2008–09 | Invitation to Openness | Origin | 2022 | Trio, Tony Marino (bass), Billy Mintz (drums) |
| 2009–10 | E Pluribus Unum - Live in Seattle | Origin | 2010 | Live. Trio, Jeff Johnson (bass), John Bishop (drums). |
| 2011 | Trip the Light Fantastic | Origin | 2011 | Trio, Jeff Johnson (bass), John Bishop (drums) |
| 2012 | Airegin Revisited | Origin | 2012 | Trio, Jeff Johnson (bass), John Bishop (drums) |
| 2014? | O's Time | Origin | 2014 | Trio, Jeff Johnson (bass), John Bishop (drums) |
| 2016–09 | Live at the Cota Jazz Festival | Origin | 2017 | Live. Qualtet with the Youngbloods, Nathan Bellott (alto sax), Dean Torrey (bass), David Frazier (drums). |
| 2016–10 | Cubist | Origin | 2018 | Quartet, Jeff Johnson (bass), John Bishop (drums), Jerry Bergonzi (tenor sax) |
| 2016–11 | The Zone: Live at The Yardbird Suite | Origin | 2019 | Live. Trio, Jeff Johnson (bass), John Bishop (drums). |

=== As sideman ===
With Cannonball Adderley

- Inside Straight (Fantasy, 1973)
- Love, Sex, and the Zodiac (Fantasy, 1973)
- Pyramid (Fantasy, 1974)

With Chet Baker

- The Most Important Jazz Album of 1964/65 (Colpix, 1964)
- Baby Breeze (Limelight, 1965)
- Live at Fat Tuesday's (Fresh Sound, 1981) – live

With Phil Woods

- Birds of a Feather (Antilles, 1982)
- Dizzy Gillespie Meets Phil Woods Quintet (Timeless, 1987)
- Bop Stew (Concord, 1988) – live
- Boquet (Concord, 1989) – live
- All Birds Children (Concord, 1991)

With others

- Nat Adderley, Double Exposure (Prestige, 1975)
- Franco Ambrosetti, Heartbop (Enja, 1981)
- Randy Brecker, Score (Solid State, 1969)
- Tom Harrell, Open Air (SteepleChase, 1986)
- Sam Rivers, A New Conception (Blue Note, 1967)
- John Scofield, Rough House (Enja, 1979)

== See also ==
- List of jazz arrangers

== Bibliography ==
- Forward Motion: From Bach To Bebop. A Corrective Approach to Jazz Phrasing, AuthorHouse, July 17, 2003, ISBN 978-1410712141
- The Touring Musician: A Small Business Approach to Booking Your Band on the Road, Alfred Publishing, January 10, 2007, ISBN 978-0739046890
