= Tamara Taylor (disambiguation) =

Tamara Taylor (born 1970) is a Canadian actress.

Tamara Taylor may also refer to:

- Tamara Taylor (rugby union) (born 1981), English rugby player
- Tehrah (Tamara Taylor, born 1965), American vocalist, songwriter and producer
