= Score (Randy Brecker album) =

Studio album by Randy Brecker
- Released: 1969
- Recorded: January 24 & February 3, 1969
- Studio: Van Gelder Studio, Englewood Cliffs, NJ
- Genre: Jazz
- Length: 38:43
- Label: Solid State; SS-18051
- Producer: Duke Pearson

Randy Brecker chronology
| Score (1969) | Amanda (1985) |

Score is the debut album by American jazz trumpeter Randy Brecker recorded in 1969 and originally released on the Solid State label.

== Songs ==
The song The Weasel Goes Out to Lunch is an arrangement of the traditional song Pop Goes the Weasel but adapted with dissonant harmony suggesting a style of Avant-garde jazz inspired by the 1964 album Out to Lunch! by Eric Dolphy.

== Reception ==
Professional ratings
Review scores
| Source | Rating |
|---|---|
| Allmusic | 4/5 stars |
| The Penguin Guide to Jazz Recordings | 3/4 stars |

The Allmusic review by Steve Loewy stated: "The tunes alternate between jazz-rock (a style the Brecker Brothers were later to successfully exploit) and modern mainstream jazz. There are the customary fades, popular at the time, and a light, though constant, beat throughout that makes the music both accessible and even danceable, an impressive feat considering that virtually all the tunes are originals. ... With well-constructed arrangements, strong soloing, and catchy melodies, Brecker knew he was onto something, and this album was the first of several successful ventures".

== Track listing ==
All compositions by Randy Brecker except where noted

1. "Bangalore" – 4:34
2. "Score" (Hal Galper) – 7:17
3. "Name Game" (Galper) – 5:14
4. "The Weasel Goes Out to Lunch" (Traditional) – 1:21
5. "Morning Song" – 4:09
6. "Pipe Dream" – 4:33
7. "The Vamp" (Galper) – 5:14
8. "The Marble Sea" – 5:44

== Personnel ==
- Randy Brecker – trumpet, flugelhorn, arranger
- Michael Brecker – tenor saxophone
- Jerry Dodgion – alto flute
- Larry Coryell – guitar
- Hal Galper – piano, electric piano, arranger
- Eddie Gómez – bass
- Chuck Rainey – Fender bass
- Bernard Purdie, Mickey Roker - drums
