= Windows (Lee Konitz and Hal Galper album) =

Studio album by Lee Konitz and Hal Galper
- Released: 1976
- Recorded: November 6, 1975
- Studio: C.I., NYC
- Genre: Jazz
- Length: 65:47
- Label: SteepleChase; SCS 1057
- Producer: Nils Winther

Lee Konitz chronology
Chicago 'n All That Jazz (1975)	Windows (1976)	Warne Marsh Quintet: Jazz Exchange Vol. 1 (1975)

Hal Galper chronology
Inner Journey (1972)	Windows (1975)	Reach Out! (1976)

Windows is an album by American jazz saxophonist Lee Konitz and pianist Hal Galper, recorded in late 1975 and released on the Danish SteepleChase label.

== Critical reception ==
Professional ratings
Review scores
Source	Rating
AllMusic	4/5 stars
The Penguin Guide to Jazz Recordings	3.5/4 stars

Ken Dryden on AllMusic said, "Pairing alto saxophonist Lee Konitz with pianist Hal Galper makes for plenty of inspired moments in this 1975 studio date ... both Konitz and Galper listen intensely to one another and react intuitively, as if they had been playing together for a long while".

== Track listing ==
1. "I'm Getting Sentimental Over You" (George Bassman, Ned Washington) – 6:12
2. "Windows" (Chick Corea) – 5:34
3. "Villainesque" (Hal Galper) – 5:13
4. "Sweet and Lovely" (Gus Arnheim, Jules LeMare, Harry Tobias) – 4:32
5. "Stella by Starlight" (Victor Young, Ned Washington) – 5:11
6. "Goodbye" (Gordon Jenkins) – 4:05
7. "Solar" (Miles Davis) – 5:36
8. "Soliloquy" (Lee Konitz) – 3:11
9. "Softly, as in a Morning Sunrise" (Sigmund Romberg, Oscar Hammerstein II) – 3:55
10. "Solar" [take 1] (Davis) – 5:51
11. "Stella by Starlight" [take 1] (Young, Washington) – 5:32
12. "Windows" [take 1] (Corea) – 6:57
13. "Sweet and Lovely" [take 1] (Arnheim, LeMare, Tobias) – 4:28 Bonus track on CD reissue

== Personnel ==
- Lee Konitz – alto saxophone
- Hal Galper – piano (tracks 1–7 & 9–13)
