= So Far So Close =

Studio album by Eliane Elias
- Released: 1989
- Recorded: at Skyline Studios, Duplex Sound, Clinton Recording Studio in New York
- Genre: Contemporary jazz
- Length: 41:45
- Label: Blue Note B1-91411
- Producer: Don Alias, Deodato

Eliane Elias chronology
Cross Currents (1987)	So Far So Close (1989)	Eliane Elias Plays Jobim (1990)

Professional ratings
Review scores
Source	Rating
AllMusic	2.5/5 stars

So Far So Close is the fourth studio album by Brazilian jazz artist Eliane Elias. It was released in 1989 via Blue Note label. She wrote eight compositions for this album. This is her first album recorded via Blue Note.

== Reception ==
In his review Scott Yanow of Allmusic stated "Having established her credentials as a fine acoustic pianist, she switched back to her less personal synthesizer work and contributed some rather mundane wordless vocals. The music (which includes some solos from tenor saxophonist Michael Brecker and Randy Brecker on flugelhorn) is not terrible, but it lacks a sense of adventure and sounds as if potential radio airplay was its main goal."

== Track listing ==
All tracks are written by Eliane Elias except track 9 by Alan Palanker

No.	Title	Length
1.	"At First Sight"	4:50
2.	"Bluestone"	5:38
3.	"Barefoot"	4:40
4.	"Nightimer"	6:10
5.	"Still Hidden"	1:51
6.	"So Far So Close"	5:48
7.	"Straight Across (To Jaco)"	5:50
8.	"With You in Mind"	2:28
9.	"Two Way Street"	4:30
Total length:		41:45

== Select personnel ==
- Don Alias – percussion, producer
- Jim Beard – programming, synthesizer
- Michael Brecker – tenor saxophone
- Randy Brecker – flugelhorn
- Café – percussion
- Deodato – associate producer, engineer, producer
- Eliane Elias – arranger, piano, producer, synthesizer, vocals
- Peter Erskine – drums
- Will Lee – bass
