= Dreams (band) =

American jazz-rock group

- Genres: Jazz-rock
- Labels: Columbia
- Past members: John Abercrombie; Michael Brecker; Randy Brecker; Billy Cobham; Don Grolnick; Jeff Kent; Will Lee; Douglas Lubahn; Bob Mann; Barry Rogers; Ford Winnek; Eddie Vernon

Dreams was an American jazz-rock group, which was one of the original prominent bands of the genre in the late 1960s and early 1970s. The band was formed by Jeff Kent and Doug Lubahn, who wrote and arranged their songs. It began as a trio and evolved into a horn-based band over time. They were later joined by Will Lee, Don Grolnick, Bob Mann, and Eddie Vernon.

Dreams selected as their producer, composer and sound engineer, Fred Weinberg, whose work includes albums for Eddie Palmieri, Tito Puente, La Lupe, Mongo Santamaria, Celia Cruz, Illustration (Alan Lorber's group), and Little Anthony. Phil Ramone, another highly respected producer and studio owner, for whom Weinberg worked at the time at a studio named A & R in New York City, gave his blessings to Weinberg to record and mix the Dreams LP with former Atlantic A-1 engineer Jim Reeves at CBS Studios in New York City. During the Dreams sessions the recording sessions were moved by CBS execs to their CBS Chicago Studios because the CBS 52nd street studios became booked for several weeks by Paul Simon, and because Dreams had a deadline for their LP release. The album received a full page ad and a favorable review in Billboard Magazine.

Dreams' second and final album Imagine My Surprise was produced in Memphis by Steve Cropper. Cropper wanted to "help the audience to better understand the group" so in his production he put "funkier, more commercial rhythms behind [the band]" while trying to "keep jazz up front at the same time."

While Dreams did not achieve the commercial success of Chicago, Chase, Blood Sweat & Tears and Ides of March, they served as a launchpad for eventually prominent jazz fusion artists Billy Cobham, Don Grolnick, and Randy & Michael Brecker (later known as the Brecker Brothers).

Other prominent band members included bassist Will Lee, guitarist John Abercrombie, trombonist Barry Rogers, and guitarist Bob Mann (who later joined Mountain).

One of the principal differences between Dreams and most other brass-infused bands was Dream's emphasis on spontaneity. The horn section would "work up spontaneous arrangements by jamming, always leaving them wide open to interpretations from night to night."

== Discography ==
=== Albums ===
Year	Album	Chart Positions	Label
Year	Album	US 200	Label
1970	Dreams	146	Columbia
1971	Imagine My Surprise	—	Columbia
