= Back to Back (Brecker Brothers album) =

Studio album by Brecker Brothers
- Released: 1976
- Studio: Electric Lady, New York City
- Genre: Jazz fusion, jazz funk
- Label: Arista, BMG
- Producer: The Brecker Brothers

Brecker Brothers chronology
| The Brecker Bros. (1975) | Back to Back (1976) | Don’t Stop the Music (1977) |

Professional ratings
Review scores
| Source | Rating |
|---|---|
| AllMusic | 3/5 stars |
| The Rolling Stone Jazz Record Guide | 2/5 stars |

Back to Back is the second album by American jazz fusion group, the Brecker Brothers. It was released by Arista Records in 1976.

== Reception ==
AllMusic gave the album three stars.

== Track listing ==
1. "Keep it Steady (Brecker Bump)" (Randy Brecker, Steve Khan, David Sanborn, Luther Vandross) – 6:24
2. "If You Wanna Boogie...Forget It" (Don Grolnick, Steve Khan, Will Lee) – 3:58
3. "Lovely Lady" (Randy Brecker, Allee Willis, Charlotte Crossley) – 6:17
4. "Night Flight" (Michael Brecker) – 6:17
5. "Slick Stuff" (Randy Brecker) – 4:48
6. "Dig a Little Deeper" (Don Grolnick, Will Lee, Allee Willis, David Lasley) – 4:00
7. "Grease Piece" (Michael Brecker, Randy Brecker, Steve Khan, David Sanborn) – 5:47
8. "What Can a Miracle Do" (Don Grolnick, Luther Vandross) – 4:16
9. "I Love Wastin' Time With You" (Michael Brecker, Allee Willis, Charlotte Crossley) – 6:31

== Personnel ==
The Brecker Brothers

- Michael Brecker – tenor saxophone, flute
- Randy Brecker – trumpet, electric trumpet, flugelhorn

Other Musicians

- Don Grolnick – keyboards
- Dave Wittman – synthesizer programming
- Steve Khan – guitars
- Will Lee – electric bass, lead vocals, backing vocals
- Chris Parker – drums (1, 2, 3, 5–8)
- Steve Gadd – drums (4, 9)
- Ralph MacDonald – percussion (1, 2, 3, 5–9)
- Sammy Figueroa – percussion (4)
- Rafael Cruz – percussion (4)
- David Friedman – marimba (6)
- David Sanborn – alto saxophone
- Lew Del Gatto – baritone saxophone (2)
- Luther Vandross – backing vocals, BGV arrangements
- Robin Clark – backing vocals
- Diane Sumler – backing vocals
- Patti Austin – backing vocals (9)
- Allee Willis – backing vocals (9)

Production

- Steve Backer – executive producer
- The Brecker Brothers – producers
- Jimmy Douglass – engineer
- Jerry Solomon – assistant engineer
- Nancy Greenberg – art direction, design
- Robert L. Heimall – art direction, design
- Benno Friedman – photography
- Anthony Barone – management
