= George Whitty =

American musician and record producer

George Whitty is an American musician, composer, record producer, audio engineer and music educator.

== Biography ==
Whitty was born and raised in Coos Bay, Oregon, and is a 1980 graduate of Marshfield High School.

As a musician, he has played and recorded with artists such as Dave Matthews and Santana (Supernatural), Celine Dion (Falling into You and These Are Special Times), Michael and Randy Brecker (four years on the road, seven albums), Chaka Khan (The Woman I Am), Richard Bona, Chris Minh Doky, Sadao Watanabe, Grover Washington Jr., Till Brönner (Midnight) and other well-known artists. His discography includes more than 100 CDs as a record producer or musician.

In 2012, he formed the electric jazz trio, Third Rail, with Tom Brechtlein on drums and Janek Gwizdala on bass. In 2013, the band released the live CD Ignition: Live Across Europe, composed of tracks recorded on the band's first tour of Europe. In August 2012, he performed at the Hollywood Bowl with Herbie Hancock, Wayne Shorter, Carlos Santana, Marcus Miller, Dave Holland and Zakir Hussein in the Concert for Peace. In 2014, he appeared on several tracks as an orchestrator, synthesizer player and sound designer on Hancock's album, The Imagine Project.

Whitty won an Emmy Award in 2014 for his work as a composer for the television series, All My Children, and produced three Grammy Award winning CDs (most recently Randy Brecker's 34th N Lex). Whitty was nominated for Emmy Awards for his composing on the long-running TV shows One Life to Live and As the World Turns.

In 2015, he also began teaching jazz piano through ArtistWorks, an online music education website. In 2018, Whitty arranged three Hancock pieces for the Los Angeles Philharmonic with Hancock playing piano, which were performed at Disney Hall.

== Personal life ==
His brother, playwright Jeff Whitty won a Tony Award for "Best Book for a Musical" for Avenue Q, and was nominated for an Academy Award for Best Adapted Screenplay in 2019.
