= 34th N Lex =

Studio album by Randy Brecker
- Released: April 22, 2003
- Recorded: May–September 2002
- Genre: Jazz
- Label: ESC Records

Randy Brecker chronology
Hangin' in the City (2001)	34th N Lex (2003)	Soul Bop Band Live (2004)

34th N Lex is an album by Randy Brecker, released through ESC Records on April 22, 2003. In 2004, the album won Brecker the Grammy Award for Best Contemporary Jazz Album.

== Reception ==
Professional ratings
Review scores
Source	Rating
Allmusic	4/5 stars
The Penguin Guide to Jazz Recordings	2.5/4 stars

Peter Marsh's review for the BBC was less-than-favorable.

== Track listing ==
All tracks are written by Randy Brecker, except where noted.

No.	Title	Length
1.	"34th N Lex"	6:29
2.	"Streeange"	4:21
3.	"Shanghigh"	5:37
4.	"All 4 Love" (Brecker, Haase, Phoenix)	3:36
5.	"Let It Go"	3:59
6.	"Foregone Conclusion" (Brecker, Henderson)	7:42
7.	"Hula Dula"	5:11
8.	"The Fisherman" (Brecker, Kottke)	5:33
9.	"Give It Up"	5:01
10.	"Tokyo Freddie"	4:36
11.	"The Castle Rocks"	4:50

== Personnel ==
- Michael Brecker – tenor saxophone
- Randy Brecker – trumpet, arranger, flugelhorn, producer, engineer, horn arrangements, pre-programming
- David Sanborn – alto saxophone
- Ada Rovatti – tenor saxophone
- Ronnie Cuber – baritone saxophone
- Michael Davis – trombone
- Fred Wesley – trombone
- Chris Minh Doky – bass, electric bass, engineer, acoustic bass
- Gary Haase – bass, guitar, arranger, drums, keyboards, programming, sound effects, producer, engineer, drum programming, percussion programming, vocal effect
- George Whitty – bass, piano, arranger, keyboards, programming, producer, engineer, drum programming, mixing, percussion programming, effects, effects programming
- Chris Taylor – guitar
- Adam Rogers – guitar, engineer
- Clarence Penn – drums
- Zach Danziger – drum programming
- J. Phoenix – vocals
- Joachim Becker – executive producer
- Dae Bennett – engineer
- Phil Pagano – engineer
- Greg Calbi – mastering
- Francois Zalacain – release production
