= The Brecker Bros. =

Studio album by Brecker Brothers
- Released: September 1975
- Recorded: January 1975
- Studios: Secret Sound, New York City
- Genres: Jazz fusion, jazz funk
- Labels: Arista, BMG
- Producer: Randy Brecker

Brecker Brothers chronology
The Brecker Bros. (1975)	Back to Back (1976)

The Brecker Bros. is the first album by the American jazz fusion group, the Brecker Brothers. It was released by Arista Records in 1975.

== Reception ==
Professional ratings
Review scores
Source	Rating
AllMusic	4.5/5 stars
The Rolling Stone Jazz Record Guide	3/5 stars

AllMusic awarded the album 4.5 stars and its review by Michael G. Nastos states, "First date for brothers from 1975. Side one is solid jazz/funk/fusion". At the 1976 Grammy Awards the album received three nominations, for Best R&B Instrumental Performance ("Sneakin’ up Behind You"), Best New Artist and Best Instrumental Arrangement (Randy Brecker for "Some Skunk Funk").

== Track listing ==
All compositions by Randy Brecker except where noted.

1. "Some Skunk Funk" - 5:51
2. "Sponge" - 4:05
3. "A Creature of Many Faces" - 7:40
4. "Twilight" - 5:43
5. "Sneakin’ up Behind You" (Michael Brecker, Randy Brecker, Don Grolnick, Will Lee, David Sanborn) - 4:54
6. "Rocks" - 4:39
7. "Levitate" - 4:31
8. "Oh My Stars" - 3:13
9. "D.B.B." - 4:46

== Personnel ==
The Brecker Brothers

- Michael Brecker – tenor saxophone
- Randy Brecker – trumpet, flugelhorn, vocals (8)

Other Musicians

- David Sanborn – alto saxophone
- Don Grolnick – keyboards
- Bob Mann – guitars
- Will Lee – electric bass, vocals (5)
- Harvey Mason – drums
- Chris Parker – additional drums (5)
- Ralph MacDonald – percussion

Production

- Steve Backer – executive producer
- Randy Brecker – producer
- Gerald Block – engineer, remixing
- David Stone – remix assistant
- Leanne Ungar – remix assistant
- Bob Heimall – art direction
- Arron Associates – design
- John Paul Endress – photography

== Charts ==
Year	Single	Chart positions
Year	Single	Billboard Hot 100
1975	"Sneakin’ up Behind You"	58
