= The Guerilla Band =

Studio album by Hal Galper
- Released: 1971
- Recorded: 1971
- Genre: Jazz fusion
- Length: 36:42
- Label: Mainstream; MRL 337
- Producer: Bob Shad

Hal Galper chronology
| The Guerilla Band (1971) | Wild Bird (1972) |

The Guerilla Band is an album by American pianist Hal Galper released on the Mainstream label in 1971.

== Critical reception ==
Professional ratings
Review scores
| Source | Rating |
|---|---|
| Allmusic | 3.5/5 stars |

The Allmusic review by Jim Todd states "While not one of the classics of the jazz fusion movement of the early '70s, The Guerilla Band does attempt to say something substantial and avoids the genre's commercial pitfalls ... Galper writes long, impressionistic lines that are played over busy, skittering, rhythms – imagine Miles Davis's In a Silent Way merged with a funky, Isley Brothers' track ... this band produces a distinctive brand of jazz fusion that deserves a place in any thorough documentation of the genre's short-lived, peak creative year".

== Track listing ==
All compositions by Hal Galper unless noted.

1. "Call" - 6:05
2. "Figure Eight" - 7:37
3. "Black Night" - 3:16
4. "Welcome to My Dreams" (Jimmy Van Heusen, Johnny Burke) - 4:50
5. "Rise and Fall" - 9:05
6. "Point of View" - 5:49

== Personnel ==
- Hal Galper - electric piano
- Randy Brecker - trumpet, electric trumpet, flugelhorn
- Michael Brecker - tenor saxophone, soprano saxophone
- Bob Mann - electric guitar
- Victor Gaskin - electric bass
- Charles Alias - drums
- Steve Haas - drums
