= Inner Journey =

Studio album by Hal Galper
- Released: 1973
- Recorded: 1973
- Genre: Jazz
- Length: 42:04
- Label: Mainstream; MRL 398
- Producer: Bob Shad

Hal Galper chronology
Wild Bird (1972)	Inner Journey (1973)	Windows (1975)

Inner Journey is an album by American pianist Hal Galper released on the Mainstream label in 1973.

== Critical reception ==
Professional ratings
Review scores
Source	Rating
Allmusic	3.5/5 stars

The Allmusic review by Ken Dryden states "Hal Galper's third album as a leader, which also was his third and final recording for the Mainstream label, finds him making a bit of a change. It was at this point in his career that he made a clean break from playing electric piano at all, becoming exclusively an acoustic pianist ... it remains one of the very best recording from Hal Galper's early days as a leader".

== Track listing ==
All compositions by Hal Galper unless noted.

1. "Inner Journey" - 7:04
2. "Invitation to Openness" - 6:27
3. "P.M. in the A.M." - 5:04
4. "Joy Ride" - 4:12
5. "My Funny Valentine" (Richard Rodgers, Lorenz Hart) - 5:20
6. "Taking the Coltrane" (Duke Ellington) - 4:26
7. "Wandering Spirit" - 4:31

== Personnel ==
- Hal Galper - piano
- Dave Holland - bass
- Bill Goodwin - drums
