= Illusions (Eliane Elias album) =

Studio album by Eliane Elias
- Released: 1986
- Recorded: October 22–24, 1986
- Studio: RPM Studios, New York City
- Genre: Jazz
- Length: 59:29
- Label: Denon Records CY-1569
- Producer: Christine Martin, Eliane Elias

Eliane Elias chronology
Amanda (1985)	Illusions (1986)	Cross Currents (1987)

Professional ratings
Review scores
Source	Rating
AllMusic	4/5 stars
The Penguin Guide to Jazz on CD	2.5/4 stars
The Virgin Encyclopedia of Jazz	3/5 stars

Illusions is the first album featuring Brazilian jazz pianist and singer Eliane Elias as a leader. The record was released in 1986 on the Denon label.

== Reception ==
Scott Yanow of Allmusic noted "Eliane Elias' debut as a leader ... finds her abandoning the electric keyboards in favor of acoustic piano. A fine start to a significant solo career."

== Track listing ==
No.	Title	Writer(s)	Length
1.	"Choro"	Amilton Godoy	5:41
2.	"Through the Fire"	David Foster, Tommy Keane, Cynthia Weil	6:05
3.	"Illusions"	Eliane Elias	7:09
4.	"Moments"	Eliane Elias	5:53
5.	"Falling in Love with Love"	Richard Rodgers, Lorenz Hart	6:23
6.	"Iberia"	Eliane Elias	10:26
7.	"Loco Motif"	Eliane Elias	5:41
8.	"Sweet Georgie Fame"	Blossom Dearie, Sandra Harris	5:43
9.	"Chan's Song"	Stevie Wonder, Herbie Hancock	5:43
Total length:			59:29

== Personnel ==
- Eliane Elias – piano
- Stanley Clarke – bass (1, 2)
- Lenny White – drums (1, 2)
- Eddie Gómez – bass (3–9)
- Al Foster – drums (4–6, 8, 9)
- Steve Gadd – drums (3, 7)
- Toots Thielemans – harmonica (4, 9)

== Chart performance ==
Illusions peaked at #1 Radio & Records in September 1987 on the Contemporary Jazz chart.
