= Wild Bird =

Studio album by Hal Galper
- Released: 1972
- Recorded: 1971
- Genre: Jazz fusion
- Length: 39:06
- Label: Mainstream; MRL 337
- Producer: Bob Shad

Hal Galper chronology
The Guerilla Band (1971)	Wild Bird (1972)	Inner Journey (1973)

Wild Bird is an album by American pianist Hal Galper released on the Mainstream label in 1972.

Professional ratings
Review scores
Source	Rating
Allmusic	3/5 stars

== Track listing ==
All compositions by Hal Galper.

1. "Trilogy: Convocation" – 7:05
2. "Trilogy: Wild Bird" – 8:03
3. "Trilogy: Change Up" – 5:04
4. "This Moment" – 11:40
5. "Whatever" – 7:14

== Personnel ==
- Hal Galper – electric piano
- Randy Brecker – trumpet, electric trumpet
- Michael Brecker – tenor saxophone, soprano saxophone
- Jonathan Graham – electric guitar
- Bob Mann – electric guitar
- Victor Gaskin – bass, electric bass
- Charles LaChappelle – bass, electric bass
- Bill Goodwin – drums
- Billy Hart – drums
