= Reach Out! (Hal Galper album) =

Studio album by Hal Galper Quintet
- Released: 1977
- Recorded: November 11, 1976
- Genre: Jazz
- Length: 50:52
- Label: SteepleChase; SCS 1067
- Producer: Nils Winther

Hal Galper chronology
Windows (1975)	Reach Out! (1977)	Now Hear This (1972)

Reach Out! is an album by American pianist Hal Galper's Quintet, released on the Danish SteepleChase label in 1977.

== Critical reception ==
Professional ratings
Review scores
Source	Rating
Allmusic	4.5/5 stars
The Penguin Guide to Jazz Recordings	3.5/4 stars

The Allmusic review by Ken Dryden states, "Hal Galper was on a tour during the 1970s, writing a number of adventurous post-bop compositions and getting regular opportunities to record them ... This is easily one of [his] best recordings".

== Track listing ==
All compositions by Hal Galper unless noted.

1. "Reach Out" – 9:12
2. "I'll Never Stop Loving You" (Nicholas Brodszky, Sammy Cahn) – 7:15
3. "Spidit" – 5:57
4. "My Man's Gone Now" (George Gershwin, DuBose Heyward) – 3:51 Bonus track on CD reissue
5. "Waiting for Chet" – 8:09
6. "I Can't Get Started" (Vernon Duke, Ira Gershwin) – 3:14
7. "Children of the Night" – 13:14

== Personnel ==
- Hal Galper – piano
- Randy Brecker – trumpet
- Michael Brecker – tenor saxophone, flute
- Wayne Dockery – bass
- Billy Hart – drums
