= Cross Currents (Eliane Elias album) =

Studio album by Eliane Elias
- Released: 1987
- Recorded: March 16–21, 1987 in New York
- Genre: Contemporary jazz
- Length: 1:02:50
- Label: Denon Records, Blue Note
- Producer: Randy Brecker, Eliane Elias

Eliane Elias chronology
Illusions (1986)	Cross Currents (1987)	So Far So Close (1989)

Professional ratings
Review scores
Source	Rating
AllMusic	4/5 stars
The Virgin Encyclopedia of Jazz	3/5 stars
Tom Hull	B+

Cross Currents is the third studio album by Brazilian jazz pianist Eliane Elias. The record was released via Denon Records Blue Note label.

== Reception ==
Scott Yanow of Allmusic stated "Pianist Eliane Elias' second of two Denon CDs recorded before she hooked up with Blue Note is a lesser-known but worthy session. Elias is mostly featured in a trio with bassist Eddie Gomez and drummer Jack DeJohnette performing originals, a pair of Charles Mingus compositions ("Peggy's Blue Skylight" and "East Coasting"), "Beautiful Love," "When You Wish Upon a Star" and Bud Powell's "Hallucinations." Elias was quickly developing into a strong modern mainstream pianist. The concluding number ("Coming and Going") was written by her grandmother in 1927 at age 12 and features Elias with Gomez, drummer Peter Erskine, guitarist Barry Finnerty, percussionist Cafe and nine singers (including a few family members). Well worth searching for." A reviewer of Dusty Groove added "Lovely work from Eliane Elias – and exactly the set you should turn to if you ever doubted her chops on the piano! Elias starts with a quick rendition of Bud Powell's "Hallucinations", played with a deftness that Toshiko Akiyoshi would appreciate – and the set then runs into a batch of tunes that includes some charming originals from Eliane – those fully formed numbers that always made her a well-rounded talent right from the start! The blend of sensitivity and swing on the record is really impressive".

== Track listing ==
No.	Title	Writer(s)	Length
1.	"Hallucinations"	Bud Powell	3:43
2.	"Cross Currents"	Eliane Elias	5:35
3.	"One Side of You"	Eliane Elias	5:13
4.	"East Coasting"	Charles Mingus	6:54
5.	"Coming and Going" (Vou Alí E Já Volto)	Egle Chiarelli	3:47
6.	"Campari & Soda"	Eliane Elias	5:39
7.	"Beautiful Love"	Egbert Van Alstyne, Haven Gillespie, Victor Young, Wayne King	6:54
8.	"Impulsive"	Eliane Elias	4:15
9.	"When You Wish Upon a Star"	Leigh Harline, Ned Washington	6:42
Total length:			01:02:50

== Selected personnel ==
Band

- Eliane Elias – piano, producing
- Barry Finnerty – acoustic guitar
- Eddie Gómez – bass
- Jack DeJohnette – drums (except tracks 2, 5, and 6)
- Café – percussion (track 2)
- Peter Erskine – drums (tracks 2, 5, and 6)

Production

- Malcolm Pollack – recording engineer
- Randy Brecker – producer
- Christine Martin – executive producer

== Chart performance ==
Cross Currents peaked at #1 on the Jazz chart of the Gavin Report.

== Notes ==
- The song "Coming And Going (Vou Alí E Já Volto)" was written by Eliane's grandmother in 1927 when she was 12 years old.
- Eliane Elias plays Steinway & Sons pianos.
