= Now Hear This (Hal Galper album) =

Studio album by Hal Galper
- Released: 1977
- Recorded: February 15, 1977
- Studio: C.I., NYC
- Genre: Jazz
- Length: 42:04
- Label: Enja enja 2090
- Producer: Horst Weber and Matthias Winckelmann

Hal Galper chronology
Reach Out! (1976)	Now Hear This (1977)	Redux '78 (1978)

Now Hear This is an album by the American pianist Hal Galper. It released on the Enja label in 1977.

== Critical reception ==
Professional ratings
Review scores
Source	Rating
All About Jazz	4.5/5 stars
AllMusic	4.5/5 stars
The Encyclopedia of Popular Music	2/5 stars

The San Francisco Examiner called Now Hear This "a very strong album," and praised "Cecil McBee's driving bass and the brilliant drumming of Tony Williams."

The AllMusic review by Ken Dryden states: "Hal Galper has long been an underrated composer and pianist. This Enja release from 1977 finds him at the top of his game in both roles." In 2010, when reviewing the CD reissue, he said, "This is easily one of Galper's best recordings of the 1970s."

== Track listing ==
All compositions by Hal Galper unless noted.

1. "Now Hear This" - 8:19
2. "Shadow Waltz" - 6:11
3. "Mr. Fixit" - 5:02
4. "First Song in the Day" - 9:02
5. "Bemsha Swing" (Thelonious Monk, Denzil Best) - 6:09
6. "Red Eye Special" - 5:32
7. "First Song in the Day" [alternate take] - 7:32 Bonus track on CD reissue

== Personnel ==
- Hal Galper – piano
- Terumasa Hino – trumpet
- Cecil McBee – double bass
- Tony Williams – drums
