= Night in Calisia =

2012 jazz studio album by Randy Brecker and others

Studio album by Randy Brecker feat. Wlodek Pawlik Trio, Kalisz Philharmonic Orchestra & Adam Klocek
- Released: November 13, 2012
- Recorded: March 3–4, 2011
- Studio: Polskie Radio
- Genre: Jazz
- Length: 63:37
- Label: Pawlik/Summit

Night in Calisia is a jazz album recorded by Randy Brecker, the Wlodek Pawlik Trio, the Kalisz Philharmonic Orchestra and Adam Klocek. Composed to celebrate the 1850th anniversary of Kalisz, the six-part jazz suite was recorded in March 2011, and released in Poland on November 13, 2012, and in the United States on August 13, 2013 through Summit Records. The album won the 2014 Grammy Award for Best Large Jazz Ensemble Album.

== Background and recording ==
Night in Calisia is the third collaboration between Polish jazz pianist and composer Włodzimierz Pawlik and American trumpeter Randy Brecker – their first album, Turtles, was released in 1995; while, Nostalgic Journey - Tykocin Jazz Suite was released through Summit Records in 2009.

To celebrate the 1850th anniversary of the Polish town of Kalisz, the director of the Kalisz Philharmonic Orchestra Adam Klocek asked Pawlik to write a composition for the occasion. Randy Brecker, Wlodek Pawlik Trio (with Pawlik on piano, Paweł Pańta on double bass and Cezary Konrad on drums) and the Kalisz Philharmonic Orchestra conducted by Klocek played a concert in Kalisz on June 19, 2010. The album was recorded in the studios of Polskie Radio on March 3–4, 2011.

== Composition ==
Night in Calisia is a six-part jazz suite. The title of the first track, "Night in Calisia", was inspired by the jazz standard by Dizzy Gillespie, "A Night in Tunisia" (1942). The third part of the suite, "Orienthology", is a reference to "Ornithology" (1946) by jazz saxophonist Charlie Parker.

"The Tykocin music is directly connected with the history of the Brecker's family battle with Michael's disease, (...) whereas the compositions for Kalisz are lacking any clear programme. I was rather playing with form, picturing completely abstract and surreal associations for example within the titles, referring to the wanderings of merchants on the ancient Amber Road, on which, according to Roman books, the settlement known as Calisia lay," said Włodzimierz Pawlik in an interview with Jazz Forum magazine.

== Critical reception ==
In a review for All About Jazz, Nicholas F. Mondello praised the album calling it "a gem," an "exuberantly satisfying recording," and "a sprawling, beautiful and inspiring performance which, through Pawlik's effusive musical pageantry, Brecker's outstanding playing, and the orchestra's hometown fervor, appropriately helped the ancient town celebrate its 1850th anniversary."

=== Awards and accolades ===
In December 2012, Polish newspaper Rzeczpospolita hailed Night in Calisia the Jazz Album of the Year. In October 2013, the album won the Grand Prix Jazz Melomani award in Łódź, for the Album of the Year.

On January 26, 2014, the album won a Grammy Award for Best Large Jazz Ensemble Album. It was Randy Brecker's sixth win, while Włodzimierz Pawlik became the first Polish jazz musician to ever win the award.

== Track listing ==
All music is composed by Włodzimierz Pawlik.

No.	Title	Length
1.	"Night in Calisia"	10:54
2.	"Amber Road"	9:44
3.	"Orienthology"	10:17
4.	"Follow the Stars"	11:17
5.	"Quarrel of the Roman Merchants"	10:59
6.	"Forgotten Song"	10:26
Total length:		63:37

== Personnel ==
- Randy Brecker – trumpet

Wlodek Pawlik Trio

- Włodzimierz Pawlik – piano
- Paweł Pańta – double bass
- Cezary Konrad – drums

Kalisz Philharmonic Orchestra

- Adam Klocek – conducting

== Charts and certifications ==
=== Charts ===
Chart (2014)	Peak position
Polish Albums (ZPAV)	2

=== Certifications ===
Region	Certification	Certified units/sales
Poland (ZPAV)	Platinum	30,000^{*}
^{*} Sales figures based on certification alone.

== Release history ==
Region	Date	Label	Format(s)
Poland	November 13, 2012	Pawlik Relations	CD
United States	August 13, 2013	Summit Records	CD, digital download
Poland	January 25, 2014	Pawlik Relations/Fonografika	CD (reissue)
