= Patti Webster =

American entertainment publicist (1964–2013)

- Born: June 18, 1964; Somerville, New Jersey, United States
- Died: September 13, 2013 (aged 49); Somerville, New Jersey, United States
- Education: Virginia Tech
- Occupations: Publicist, author, Christian minister

Patti Webster (June 18, 1964 – September 13, 2013) was an American entertainment publicist, author, and minister. As the CEO of W&W Public Relations, a company she founded in 1991, Webster represented notable recording artists, athletes, and actors, including Janet Jackson, Alicia Keys, Usher, Halle Berry, Chris Paul and Holly Robinson Peete.

== Early life and education ==
Born in Somerville, New Jersey, Webster majored in engineering and operations research at Virginia Tech. After a series of summer internships, Webster decided not to pursue a career in engineering. Moving to Maryland, she took a job in 1985 as a marketing and publicity assistant at BET, then a fledgling network. In 1988, Webster moved to New York.

== Career ==
=== Public relations ===
In New York, Webster worked at several entertainment-related companies, eventually working as an assistant at Jive Records where she "fell in love with publicity." Subsequently, she was hired by Rogers & Cowan; during her three-year tenure at the company, she worked with Quincy Jones’ Qwest Records, Stevie Wonder, Julio Iglesias, Gloria Estefan, Diana Ross and Celine Dion. In 1991, Webster founded W&W, a public relations agency focused on representing African-Americans, signing her first client, Stephanie Mills, shortly thereafter. By 2013, Webster had built W&W into a highly respected and influential public relations agency, representing celebrities in a wide variety of fields, including Patti LaBelle, BeBe and CeCe Winans, Ludacris, Kelly Rowland, Dwight Howard, and Steve Harvey, as well as organizations including Creflo Dollar Ministries and BMI.

In 2008, Ebony honored Webster with an Outstanding Women in Communications award.

=== Author, minister, and community service ===
Despite her success as a publicist, Webster said that her real job was to spread the word of Jesus Christ. Raised in a family of clergy – her father, mother, great-grandmother, grandmother, and grandfather were pastors – Webster authored the book It Happened in Church: Stories of Humor from the Pulpit to The Pews in 2008. A collection of humorous stories from friends, pastors and celebrities, Webster said "I think that if God created laughter, it isn't to be excluded from church. I think laughter is to be everywhere." Webster was ordained as a minister in 2011 and served as a deaconess at Shiloh Pentecostal Church in Somerville, New Jersey, where she grew up.

She served as a member of the National Academy of Recording Arts and Sciences (NARAS), on the boards of the Ovarian Cancer Research Fund and the TReach (Therapies Reaching & Educating Autistic Children) Foundation, and on the Make-A-Wish Foundation's Marketing Mavericks team.

Webster died of cancer at a hospital in Somerville on September 13, 2013, aged 49.
