= Tehrah =

American singer

- Birth name: Tamara Taylor
- Born: March 6, 1965 (age 60)
- Occupation(s): Songwriter, producer
- Instrument: Vocals

Tamara Taylor, known as Tehrah (born March 6, 1965) is an American power vocalist, songwriter and producer. She has been recognized with Grammy Nomination Considerations, LA Music Awards, Producers Choice Awards, Women’s Leadership Awards, Humanitarian efforts, and in 2016, Best Vocalist for the Arts for Peace Awards at the Saban Theater in Beverly Hills, California.

== Career highlights ==
- 2012 – "WINNER 22nd Annual LA Music Awards Christian Contemporary Artist of the Year" “Prodigal Son”
- 2013 – NOMINATED IN 3 CATEGORIES 56th Annual Grammy Awards “In God’s Time”
- 2014 – NOMINATED IN 3 CATEGORIES 57th Annual Grammy Awards “In The Raw”
- 2016 – WINNER Arts for Peace Awards, Best Vocalist
