= Don Engel =

American lawyer

- Born: Donald S. Engel; December 11, 1929; Bronx, New York, U.S.
- Died: January 15, 2014 (aged 84); Encino, Los Angeles, California, U.S.
- Known for: Representing major artists
- Children: 4

Donald Engel (December 11, 1929 – January 15, 2014), known as Don Engel, was an American attorney who represented popular music stars of the 1980s and 1990s, particularly those who wanted to break their contracts with recording studios. He also represented corporations and people in the publishing industry.

== Career ==
Engel was an attorney in New York City, specializing in publishing law, but he moved to Los Angeles in the mid-1970s. Among the popular stars who sought him out to help in revising or canceling their recording contracts were Don Henley, Donna Summer and the band Boston. Entertainment attorney Chris Castle said that "In many important ways, what we have come to call the artists rights movement in the U.S. started with Don Engel's representation of artists against record companies who overreached."

Engel argued successfully in court that California law stated that some contracts could not be extended past seven years. In 1944, that argument allowed actress Olivia de Havilland to end her contract with the Warner Brothers studio. He became known as "the contract-buster," and it was said that "record companies often chose to settle rather than litigate when they were informed that he was hired.

Another notable client was Olivia Newton-John, who was sued by MCA in 1975 when she wanted to end her contract. "In a victory for Newton-John, courts decided that MCA couldn’t extend her contract past seven years even if she failed to perform under it." But that led the California legislature to change the law so that artists who didn't fulfill their commitment during the term of a deal could be sued for “lost profits” on uncompleted albums.

In the 1990s, Engel received more clients after Michael Jackson signed a $65 million-plus contract and his sister, Janet, earned $40 million a year. Other artists then began working to renegotiate or end their contracts as well. The Los Angeles Times reported that Engel "was able to pave the way for Donna Summer to go from Casablanca Records to Geffen Records, Sammy Hagar from Capitol Records to Geffen, Teena Marie from Motown Records to CBS and Boston from CBS to MCA." Other clients were Frank Sinatra, Tom Jones, the Jacksons, Don Henley, Stevie Nicks, Cher, Clint Black, the Dixie Chicks, Janis Ian, Joan Jett, Meat Loaf, Rod Stewart, Van Halen, Leiber & Stoller, Doc McGhee, Farrah Fawcett, Jay Bernstein, Kasseem Dean, Don Cornelius, Robert Wagner, Stefanie Powers, Sydney Sheldon, the W. C. Fields estate and the Hopalong Cassidy character.

In publishing, he represented Simon & Schuster, Grosset & Dunlap and Golden Books. Corporate clients included Harcourt Brace and SeaWorld, Interscope, Motown, MCA, Walt Disney Company, Lorimar and Paramount.

== Personal life ==
Engel was born December 11, 1929, in the Bronx, N.Y., and graduated from City College of New York. He served as an intelligence officer in the Army during the Korean War, after which he studied law at New York University, where he was first in his class. His second wife, Judy, was also an attorney. He had four children, Gregory, Stephen, Jacqueline Leibsohn and Laura Engel. He died January 15, 2014, in Redwood City, California, after a 17-year battle with leukemia. Funeral services were in Mount Sinai Memorial Park Cemetery, Los Angeles.
