= Pat O'Leary =

English rugby league footballer

Personal information
- Full name: Pat O'Leary

Playing information
Club
Years	Team	Pld	T	G	FG	P
1949–53	Hull FC
1953	Hull Kingston Rovers	28	0	8	0	16
	Total	28	0	8	0	16

Pat O'Leary is a former professional rugby league footballer who played in the 1940s and 1950s. He played at club level for Hull FC and Hull KR.
