= Amanda (album) =

Studio album by Randy Brecker & Eliane Elias
- Released: 1985
- Recorded: February–March 1985
- Studio: Secret Sound Studios, New York City; Sound Ideas Studios, New York City
- Genre: Jazz, Latin
- Label: Passport Jazz PJ 88013
- Producer: Randy Brecker, Eliane Elias

Randy Brecker chronology
Straphangin' (1981)	Amanda (1985)	In the Idiom (1987)

Eliane Elias chronology
Amanda (1985)	Illusions (1987)

Professional ratings
Review scores
Source	Rating
AllMusic	1.5/5 stars

Amanda is a collaborative studio album by Brazilian jazz artist Eliane Elias and trumpeter Randy Brecker, her then husband. The record was released in 1985 via the Passport Jazz label. The album is dedicated to their daughter, Amanda Elias Brecker. Shortly thereafter her solo career began, resulting in over twenty albums to date.

== Reception ==
Scott Yanow of Allmusic gave the album a negative review, stating "Considering the talents of trumpeter Randy Brecker and his wife, pianist Eliane Elias, one would expect their 1985 collaboration to be quite worthwhile. However this out-of-print LP is a disappointment for they perform generally weak material, emphasize electronics and utilize rather dull rhythms."

== Track listing ==
No.	Title	Writer(s)	Length
1.	"Splash"	Miles Davis	5:21
2.	"Para Nada (For Nothing)"	Elias	7:09
3.	"Pandamandium"	Elias	6:24
4.	"Samba De Bamba"	Elias	8:16
5.	"Amandamada"	Elias	4:45
6.	"Guaruja"	Simon Jeffes	8:51

== Personnel ==
- Eliane Elias – piano, vocals, flute, arrangements, compositions, keyboards of all kinds
- Randy Brecker – trumpet, electric trumpet, arrangements
- Michael Brecker – tenor saxophone
- Dave Weckl – drums
- Danny Gottlieb – drums
- Manolo Badrena – percussion
- Mark Egan, Will Lee – bass
- Jeff Mironov, Barry Finnerty – guitar
- Sadao Watanabe – alto saxophone
- Cyro Baptista – percussion

Production

- Paul D'Innocenzo – cover photography

== Chart performance ==
Amanda peaked at #1 Radio & Records on the Contemporary Jazz chart.
