= Randy Brecker =

American musician (born 1945)

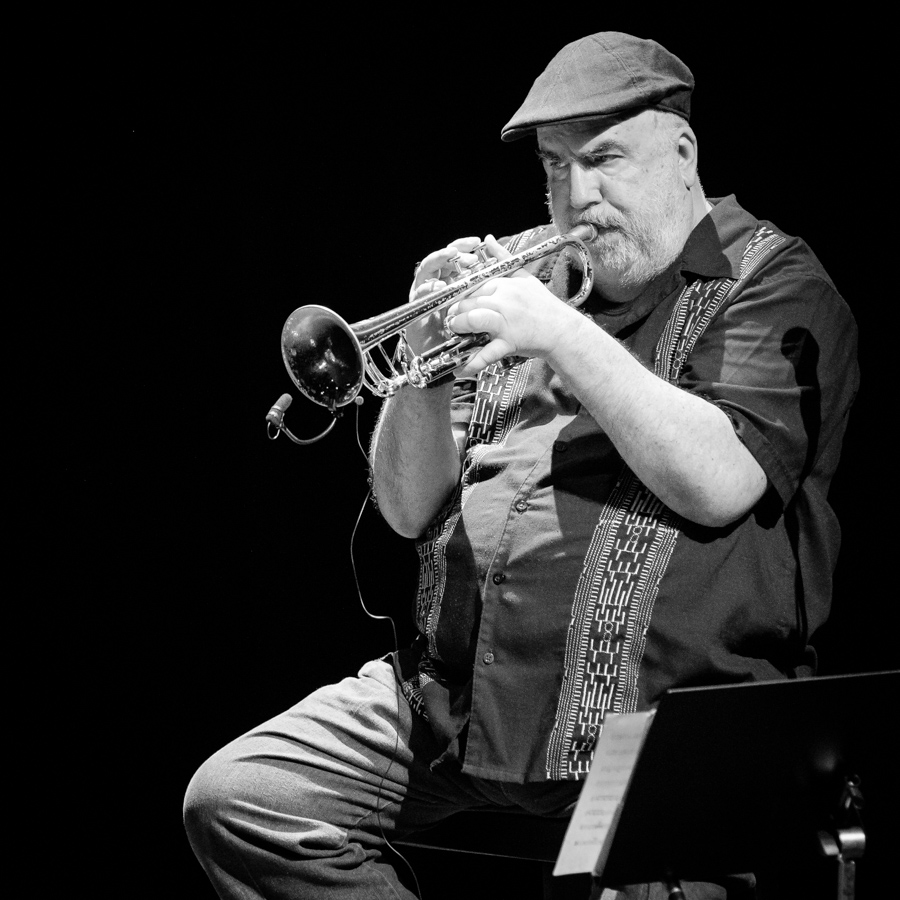
- Brecker performing at the 2018 Kongsberg Jazzfestival

Background information
- Born: Randal Edward Brecker; November 27, 1945 (age 80); Cheltenham, Pennsylvania, U.S.
- Genres: Jazz; jazz fusion; funk; R&B; rock
- Occupation: Musician
- Instruments: Trumpet; flugelhorn
- Labels: Blue Note; Arista; GNP Crescendo; MCA; GRP; Naxos; Telarc; MAMA; Denon
- Website: www.randybrecker.com

Randal Edward Brecker (born November 27, 1945) is an American trumpeter, flugelhornist, and composer. His versatility has made him a popular studio musician who has recorded with acts in jazz, rock, and R&B.

== Early life and education ==
Brecker was born in Cheltenham, Pennsylvania, on November 27, 1945, to a musical family. His father Bob (Bobby) was a lawyer who played jazz piano, and his mother Sylvia was a portrait artist.

Randy described his father as a semipro jazz pianist and trumpet fanatic. "In school when I was eight, they only offered trumpet or clarinet. I chose trumpet from hearing Diz, Miles, Clifford, and Chet Baker at home. My brother (Michael Brecker) didn't want to play the same instrument as I did, so three years later he chose the clarinet!"

Randy's father, Bob, was also a songwriter and singer who loved to listen to recordings of the great jazz trumpet players such as Miles Davis, Dizzy Gillespie and Clifford Brown. He took Randy and his younger brother Michael Brecker to see Davis, Thelonious Monk, Duke Ellington, and many other jazz icons.

Brecker attended Cheltenham High School from 1959 to 1963 and then Indiana University from 1963 to 1966 studying with Bill Adam, David Baker and Jerry Coker and later moved to New York and performed with Clark Terry's Big Bad Band, the Duke Pearson and the Thad Jones/Mel Lewis Orchestra.

== Career ==
=== 1967-1973: pre-Brecker Brothers founding ===
In 1967, Brecker ventured into jazz-rock with the band Blood, Sweat & Tears, on their first album Child Is Father to the Man, but left to join the Horace Silver Quintet. Brecker recorded his first solo album, Score, in 1968, featuring his brother Michael Brecker.

After Horace Silver, Randy Brecker joined Art Blakey's Jazz Messengers before teaming up with brother Michael, Barry Rogers, Billy Cobham, and John Abercrombie to form the fusion group Dreams. The group recorded two albums: Dreams and Imagine My Surprise for Columbia Records before they disbanded in 1971.

In the early 1970s, Brecker performed live with many artists, including The Eleventh House, Stevie Wonder, and Billy Cobham. He also recorded several albums with his brother under pianist/composer Hal Galper.

=== 1974-1982: Brecker Brothers early years ===
By 1975, Randy and Michael formed the Brecker Brothers band. They released six albums on Arista and garnered seven Grammy nominations between 1975 and 1981. Their first record, The Brecker Bros., featured Randy's composition "Some Skunk Funk", and he composed several pieces on this and subsequent albums.

After the Brecker Brothers disbanded in 1982, Randy recorded and toured as a member of Jaco Pastorius' Word of Mouth big band. It was soon thereafter that he met and later married Brazilian jazz pianist Eliane Elias. Eliane and Randy formed their own band, touring the world several times and recording one album named after their daughter together, Amanda, on Passport Records.

In 1977 he founded the jazz club Seventh Avenue South with his brother Michael Brecker.

=== 1983-2007: Grammy wins and solo career ===
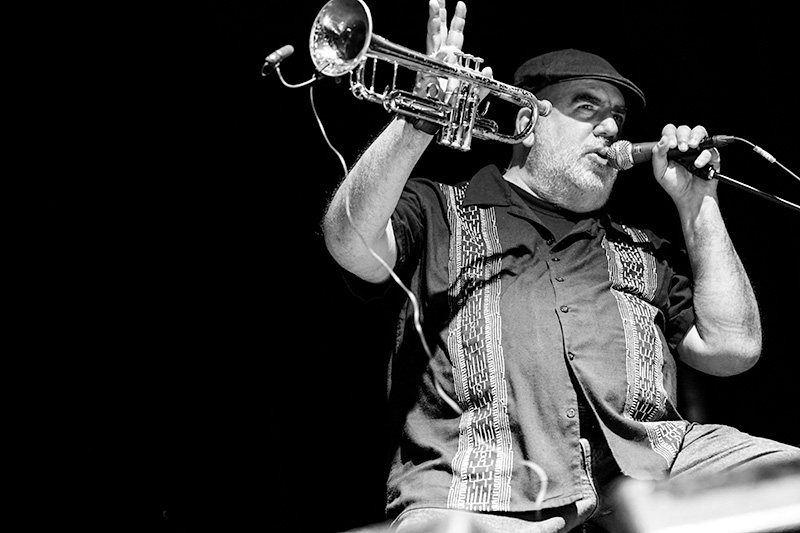
Brecker performing at the 2017 Aarhus International Jazz Festival

In 1992 Randy and Michael reunited for a world tour and the triple-Grammy nominated GRP recording The Return of the Brecker Brothers. The follow-up, 1994's Out of the Loop, was a double-Grammy winner. In 1995, he was featured on Turtles, an album by Polish composer Włodek Pawlik.

In 1997, Into the Sun (Concord), a recording featuring Brecker's impressions of Brazil, garnered Brecker his first Grammy as a solo artist.

In 2001, Brecker released Hangin' in the City (ESC), a solo project that introduced his alter-ego Randroid with lyrics and vocals by Randroid himself. This CD was released in Europe, where Brecker toured extensively with his own line-up.

Brecker's next CD for ESC Records, 34th N Lex, won him his third Grammy for Best Contemporary Jazz Album in 2003. That summer he went back to Europe with the Bill Evans Soulbop Band.

In the summer of 2003, the Brecker Brothers appeared in Japan at the Mount Fuji Jazz Festival.

2004 saw Brecker touring Europe as co-leader (with Bill Evans) of the band Soulbop. The WDR Big Band also invited Brecker to perform at the [Jazz Fest]. The date was of significance to Randy as it was the last time he played with his brother, who took ill shortly thereafter with a rare form of leukemia known as MDS.

In 2005, Brecker's wife Ada (married 2001) sat in for the first time. Brecker's schedule continued with the Randy Brecker Band performing throughout Eastern Europe.

In 2007, Brecker was awarded his fourth Grammy for Randy Brecker Live with the WDR Big Band (Telarc/BHM), the live recording (also available in DVD format) of his performance with Michael at the Leverkusen Jazz Fest in 2004. Michael died that same year on January 13.

2007 also saw the release of a two-CD set of live recordings of the band Soulbop (BHM) featuring Dave Kikoski, Victor Bailey, Steve Smith, Rodney Holmes and Hiram Bullock.\

=== 2008-2019: continued solo career and tributes ===
Brecker returned to Brazilian music in 2008 for the album Randy in Brazil, which was recorded in São Paulo with Brazilian musicians and released on Summit Records. Chosen as one of the top 10 CDs of 2008 by All About Jazz, the CD won the Grammy for "Best Contemporary Jazz Album", bringing his Grammy total to five.

A Tribute to the Brecker Brothers featuring Randy and recorded live at the Hamamatsu Jazz Festival in Japan with Yoichi Murata's Solid Brass & Big Band was released by JVC Victor in Japan in late 2008.

In 2009, Brecker released Jazz Suite Tykocin, a project initiated and conceived by Włodek Pawlik, featuring Randy as a soloist with members of the Bialystok Philharmonic. Tykocin is the area in Poland where Brecker's ancestors (mother's maiden name: Tecosky) hail from, a fact that Pawlik discovered.

2011 saw the release of The Jazz Ballad Song Book: Randy Brecker with the Danish Radio Big Band and The Danish National Chamber Orchestra, which garnered four Grammy nominations and critical acclaim. In 2012, Legacy Recordings released the boxed set The Brecker Brothers – The Complete Arista Albums Collection. In November of that year the album Night in Calisia, a collaboration between Brecker, the Wlodek Pawlik Trio, the Kalisz Philharmonic Orchestra and Adam Klocek was released in Poland. The album came out in the US in August 2013, and won the 2014 Grammy Award for Best Large Jazz Ensemble Album, Brecker's sixth Grammy Award.

A Brecker Brothers Band Reunion tour of European festivals in the summer of 2013 supported Brecker's Brecker Brothers Band Reunion, a dual-disk project which was released on September 25, 2013, on Piloo Records. It features a live DVD recorded at the Blue Note in New York City with a new 11-song studio recording featuring members of the Brecker Brothers bands from throughout the years including David Sanborn, Mike Stern, Will Lee, and Dave Weckl. George Whitty produced the album, and Brecker's wife, Ada Rovatti, also played saxophone. The recording was released in North America by Magenta/E-One, in Europe by Moosicus Records in November, and in Japan by Victor. It is dedicated to his brother, Michael, and other departed Brecker Brothers Band members.

=== 2020-2026: recent works ===
In 2022, Brecker began performing the acoustic jazz compositions of his brother Michael, arranged for the first time to include trumpet, with saxophonist Tod Dickow and the Bay Area trio, Charged Particles. Performances have included shows at Birdland in New York, at Ronnie Scott's Jazz Club in London, England, plus The Merchants House in Glasgow, Scotland, SF Jazz in San Francisco, Vibrato in Los Angeles, the Scarborough Jazz Festival in North Yorkshire, England, the San Jose Jazz, the new Palo Alto jazz club, The Spin Jazz Club in Oxford, England, plus The Stoller Hall, also in England. The collaboration was the subject of an article in the San Jose Mercury News, and a review of the Dazzle performance written by Geoff Anderson.

Upon its November 19, 2026 release, Brecker was revealed as one of the in-game DJs for Grand Theft Auto VI's Leonida Jazz radio station. Two Brecker Brothers songs Funky Sea, Funky Dew and Scrunch are a part of the station's playlist, as well as a previously unreleased collaboration between Brecker and Canadian group BadBadNotGood, Blowin' Smoke.

== Discography ==
=== As leader/co-leader ===
- 1969: Score (Solid State, 1969)
- 1985: Amanda with Eliane Elias (Passport, 1985)
- 1986: In the Idiom (Denon, 1987)
- 1988: Live at Sweet Basil (GNP Crescendo, 1988) – live
- 1990: Toe to Toe (MCA, 1990)
- 1995: Into the Sun (Concord, 1997)
- 2001: Hangin' in the City (ESC, 2001)
- 2002: 34th N Lex (ESC, 2003)
- 2003: Soul Bop Band Live with Bill Evans (BHM Productions, 2004) – live
- 2003: Some Skunk Funk (Telarc, 2005) – live with Michael Brecker
- 2006: Randy in Brasil (Mama, 2008)
- 2008: Nostalgic Journey (Summit, 2009)
- 2010: The Jazz Ballad Song Book with the Danish Radio Big Band (Half Note/Red Dot, 2012)
- 2011: Night in Calisia (Summit, 2012) – featuring Włodek Pawlik Trio, Kalisz Philharmonic Orchestra & Adam
- 2012: Trumpet Summit Prague: The Mendoza Arrangements Live with Bobby Shew, Jan Hasenohrl (Summit, 2015) – live
- 2012–2013: The Brecker Brothers Band Reunion (Moosicus, 2013)[CD + DVD-Video]
- 2014: Dearborn Station (Jazzed Media, 2015) – with the DePaul University Jazz Ensemble
- 2015: RandyPOP! (Piloo, 2015) – live at "Blue Note Jazz Club"
- 2017–2018: Rocks with the NDR Big Band-The Hamburg Jazz Orchestra (Piloo, 2019) – live
- 2018: Together with Mats Holmquist (Mama, 2018) – also with UMO Jazz Orchestra
- 2019?: Sacred Bond with Ada Rovatti (Piloo, 2019)
- 2020?: Double Dealin' with Eric Marienthal (Shanachie, 2020)
- 2026: Blowin' Smoke with BadBadNotGood

As the Brecker Brothers

- The Brecker Bros. (Arista, 1975)
- Back to Back (Arista, 1976)
- Don't Stop the Music (Arista, 1977)
- Heavy Metal Be-Bop (Arista, 1978) – live
- Detente (Arista, 1980)
- Straphangin' (Arista, 1981)
- Return of the Brecker Brothers (GRP, 1992)
- Out of the Loop (GRP, 1994)
- Live And Unreleased (Piloo, 2020)

=== As a member ===
Dreams

- Dreams (Columbia, 1970)
- Imagine My Surprise (Columbia, 1971)

GRP All-Star Big Band

- GRP All-Star Big Band (GRP, 1992)
- Dave Grusin Presents GRP All-Star Big Band Live! (GRP, 1993) – live
- All Blues (GRP, 1995) – rec. 1994

=== As sideman ===
With Patti Austin

- End of a Rainbow (CTI, 1976)
- Body Language (CTI, 1980)
- In My Life (CTI, 1983)
- Gettin' Away with Murder (CTI, 1985)

With George Benson

- Good King Bad (CTI, 1976) – recorded in 1975
- Pacific Fire (CTI, 1983) – recorded in 1975
- In Your Eyes (Warner Bros., 1983)
- Big Boss Band (Warner Bros., 1990)

With Walter Bishop Jr.

- Soul Village (Muse, 1977)
- Cubicle (Muse, 1978)

With Frank Catalano

- Pins 'n' Needles (Lakeside, 1997)
- Live at the Green Mill (Delmark, 2000)

With Billy Cobham

- Shabazz (Atlantic, 1975)
- A Funky Thide of Sings (Atlantic, 1975)

With Eliane Elias

- Cross Currents (Denon, 1987)
- So Far So Close (Blue Note, 1989)
- Kissed by Nature (RCA, 2002)
- Light My Fire (Concord Picante, 2011)
- I Thought About You (Concord, 2013)
- Dance of Time (Concord, 2017)

With Donald Fagen

- The Nightfly (Warner Bros., 1982)
- Kamakiriad (Warner Bros., 1993)

With Michael Franks

- Tiger in the Rain (1979)
- Objects of Desire (1982)
- Passionfruit (1983)
- The Camera Never Lies (1987)
- Abandoned Garden (1995)
- Barefoot on the Beach (1999)

With Hal Galper

- The Guerilla Band (Mainstream, 1971)
- Wild Bird (Mainstream, 1972)
- Reach Out! (SteepleChase, 1976)

With Bob James

- Lucky Seven (Tappan Zee, 1979)
- H (Tappan Zee, 1980)

With Garland Jeffreys

- Ghost Writer (1977)
- One-Eyed Jack (1978)

With Jimmy McGriff

- Red Beans (Groove Merchant, 1976)
- Tailgunner (LRC, 1977)

With Mingus Dynasty

- 1988: Live at the Theatre Boulogne-Billancourt/Paris, Vol. 1 (Soul Note, 1989)
- 1988: Live at the Theatre Boulogne-Billancourt/Paris, Vol. 2 (Soul Note, 1993)

With Chaka Khan

- Chaka Khan (1978)
- Naughty (1980)
- What Cha' Gonna Do for Me (1981)
- Destiny (1986)

With Bette Midler

- Songs for the New Depression (1976)
- Thighs and Whispers (1979)

With Idris Muhammad

- Power of Soul (Kudu, 1974)
- Could Heaven Ever Be Like This (Kudu, 1977)
- Camby Bolongo (Kudu, 1977)

With Jaco Pastorius

- Jaco Pastorius (Epic, 1976)
- Invitation (Warner Bros, 1983)

With Duke Pearson

- Introducing Duke Pearson's Big Band (Blue Note, 1967)
- Now Hear This (Blue Note, 1968)

With Todd Rundgren

- Something/Anything? (Bearsville, 1972)
- A Wizard, a True Star (Bearsville, 1973)
- Todd (Bearsville, 1973)

With Don Sebesky

- Giant Box (CTI, 1973)
- The Rape of El Morro (CTI, 1975)

With Horace Silver

- You Gotta Take a Little Love (Blue Note, 1969)
- In Pursuit of the 27th Man (Blue Note, 1972)
- A Prescription for the Blues (Impulse!, 1997)

With Spyro Gyra

- Morning Dance (MCA, 1979)
- Catching the Sun (MCA, 1980)

With Rickie Lee Jones

- Pirates (1981)
- Flying Cowboys (1989)

With Lou Reed

- Berlin (RCA, 1973)
- New Sensations (RCA, 1984)

With Carly Simon

- Boys in the Trees (1978)
- Spy (1979)
- Torch (1981)

With Paul Simon

- Graceland (1986)
- The Rhythm of the Saints (1990)

With Phoebe Snow

- Never Letting Go (1977)
- Rock Away (1981)

With Ringo Starr

- Ringo's Rotogravure (1976)
- Ringo the 4th (1977)

With James Taylor

- One Man Dog (Warner Bros., 1972)
- Walking Man (Warner Bros., 1974)
- That's Why I'm Here (Columbia, 1985)
- New Moon Shine (Columbia, 1991)

With Jack Wilkins

- Merge (Chiaroscuro, 1978)
- Reunion (Chiaroscuro, 2001)

With others

- Air, Air (Embryo, 1971)
- Aerosmith, Get Your Wings (Columbia, 1974)
- Philip Bailey, Dreams (1999)
- Gato Barbieri, Chapter Three: Viva Emiliano Zapata (Impulse!, 1974)
- Bob Berg, Another Standard (Stretch, 1997)
- Michel Bisceglia, About Stories (BMG, 1997)
- Carla Bley, Night-Glo (Watt, 1985)
- Ron Carter, Anything Goes (Kudu, 1975)
- Eric Clapton, August (1986)
- David Clayton-Thomas, Clayton (1978)
- Joe Cocker, Civilized Man (1984)
- Dan Costa, Iremia (2022)
- Ray Drummond, Continuum (Arabesque, 1994)
- Robin Eubanks, Mental Images (JMT, 1994)
- Aretha Franklin, Aretha (1980)
- Bunky Green, Places We've Never Been (Vanguard, 1979)
- g.org, A New Kind of Blue (2004)
- Toninho Horta, Moonstone (Verve Forecast, 1989)
- Jaroslav Jakubovič, Coincidence (VMM, 2009)
- Garland Jeffreys, Escape Artists (1981)
- Elton John Blue Moves (1976)
- Al Kooper, Rekooperation (1994)
- Steve Khan, Backlog (2016)
- Yusef Lateef, In a Temple Garden (CTI, 1979)
- Hubert Laws, The Chicago Theme (CTI, 1974)
- O'Donel Levy Windows (Groove Merchant, 1976)
- Arif Mardin, Journey (Atlantic, 1974)
- Markolino Dimond featuring Frankie Dante, Beethoven's V (Cotique, 1975)
- Melanie, Phonogenic – Not Just Another Pretty Face (1978)
- Metropole Orkest conducted by John Clayton, Better Get Hit In Your Soul: A Tribute To the Music of Charles Mingus, (BHM Productions, 2012)
- Laura Nyro Smile (1976)
- Yoko Ono, A Story (1997)
- Lonnie Smith Keep on Lovin' (Groove Merchant, 1976)
- Bruce Springsteen, Born to Run (1975)
- Steely Dan, Gaucho (1980)
- Dire Straits, Brothers in Arms (1985)
- Blood, Sweat & Tears, Child Is Father to the Man (Columbia, 1968)
- Johnny Hodges, 3 Shades of Blue (Flying Dutchman, 1970)
- Jennifer Holliday, Say You Love Me (1985)
- Dave Liebman, Pendulum (Artists House, 1978)
- Jack McDuff, Who Knows What Tomorrow's Gonna Bring? (Blue Note, 1970)
- Liza Minnelli, Gently (1996)
- Alphonse Mouzon, Funky Snakefoot (Blue Note, 1973)
- Mark Murphy, Bridging a Gap (Muse, 1972)
- David "Fathead" Newman, Scratch My Back (Prestige, 1979)
- Aaron Neville, Nature Boy: The Standards Album (2003)
- Laura Nyro, Walk the Dog and Light the Light (1993)
- Robert Palmer, Double Fun (1978)
- Włodek Pawlik, Turtles (1995)
- Ben Sidran, Live in Montreux (Sony, 1978)
- Phoebe Snow, Something Real (1989)
- Candi Staton, Chance (1979)
- Stanley Turrentine, Nightwings (Fantasy, 1977)
- Candi Staton, Candi Staton (1980)
- Tina Turner, Love Explosion (1979)
- Miroslav Vitous, Universal Syncopations II (ECM, 1995)
- Roseanna Vitro and Kenny Werner, The Delirium Blues Project: Serve or Suffer (Half Note, 2008)
- Grover Washington Jr., A House Full of Love (Columbia, 1986)
- Charles Williams, Stickball (Mainstream, 1972)
- V.A.., Thank You, Joe! Arkadia Jazz Presents: Our Tribute To Joe Henderson (Arkadia Jazz, 2000)
