= Włodek Pawlik =

Polish musical artist (born 1958)

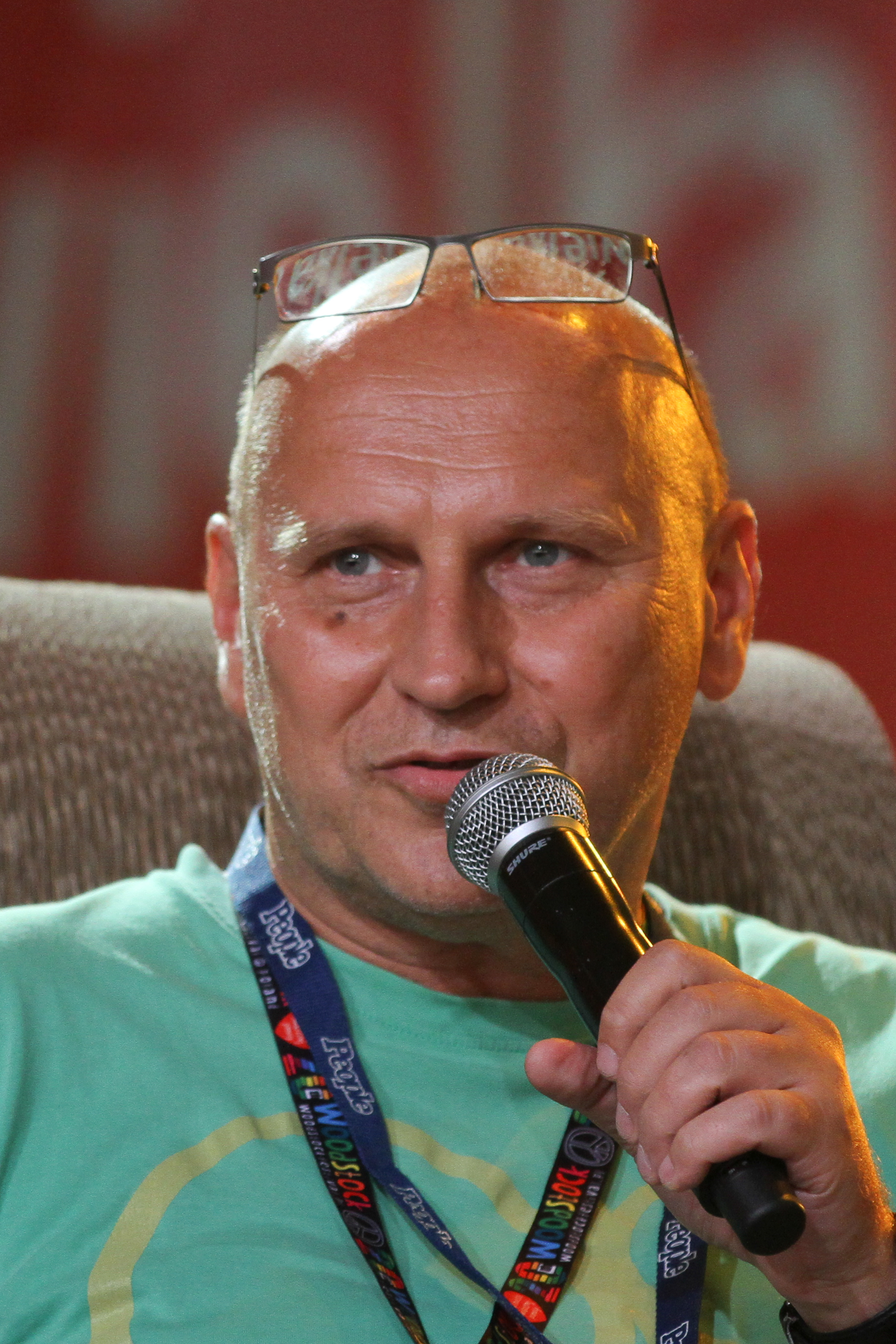
- 2014

Background information
- Also known as: Włodek Pawlik
- Born: 4 October 1958 (age 68); Kielce, Poland
- Genre: Jazz
- Occupations: Pianist, composer
- Instrument: Piano
- Website: wlodekpawlik.com

Włodek Pawlik, Włodzimierz Pawlik (Polish: [vwɔdʑimiɛʐ pavlik]; born 4 October 1958 in Kielce) is a Polish composer and jazz pianist. On 26 January 2014, he became the first Polish jazz musician to receive a Grammy Award, having won in the Best Large Jazz Ensemble Album category with his album Night in Calisia, recorded with Randy Brecker and the Kalisz Philharmonic Orchestra, released in the USA by Summit Records.

== Life and career ==
He is a graduate of the F. Chopin University of Music in the piano class of Barbara Hesse-Bukowska. He also studied jazz at the Hochschule für Musik in Hamburg.

He is a laureate of Grand Prix of the International Jazz Contest in Dunkirk (1984 France) and the second prize at the International Jazz Composition Contest in Monaco (1989), among others. Apart from jazz, his artistic output includes film soundtracks, orchestral works, 2 piano concertos, ballet music, opera, cantata and theatre music. He is an author of soundtracks for a number of acclaimed films, such as “Crows” ("Wrony") and "Pora umierać" by Dorota Kędzierzawska, “Reverse” ("Rewers") by Borys Lankosz (awarded with the “Złote Lwy (“Golden Lions”) at the 34th Polish Film Festival in Gdynia and with the “Orły” (“Eagles”) by the Polish Film Academy in 2010, both for the Best Original Score of the Year.

He has appeared at some renowned jazz festivals, such as North Sea in Hague (1998), Warsaw Summer Jazz Days (several times), European Jazz Festival in Athens (2006), Takasaki Music Festival (2014), Kaunas Jazz Festival (2015), as well as classical music festivals, such as Wratislawia Cantans in Wrocław (2003), Altstadt Herbst in Duesseldorf (2007), and Polish Music Festival in Cincinnati (2016).

Throughout the 1990s he performed regularly with the Western Jazz Quartet – a faculty jazz ensemble based at Western Michigan University (Trent Kynaston - saxophone, Tom Knific - bass). The collaboration was marked by numerous concerts around the globe and three CD albums: “Live at Jazz Club Aquarium” (feat. Billy Hart, 1993), “Turtles” (feat. Randy Brecker, 1995) and “Waning Moon” (2000).

In 2002 he had a successful solo tour of Australia that was hailed by "The Age" daily newspaper as one of the two "most mesmerising concerts during the year" in the country.

He won “Fryderyk” (Polish music prize) in 2006 for his album “Misterium Stabat Mater” for the improvising piano and Gregorian choir and the Award of TVP Kultura (Polish National Television Culture Channel) for this trio album „Anhelli” in 2006.

In 2008 he composed and recorded jazz-suite “Tykocin” along with Randy Brecker. The record was re-released in the USA by Summit Records and met with a positive reception in the USA gaining Pawlik the title of Jazz Composer of the Year 2009 from the Los Angeles-based blog “Jazz Station”

That same year “Grand Piano” – a 2CD album containing solo piano improvisations was released, followed by “Struny na Ziemi” (“Strings in the Earth”) in 2011 with the original music composed by Pawlik to poems by Jarosław Iwaszkiewicz.

In 2013 the album “Wieczorem” (“In the Evening”) with the music to poetry by Józef Czechowicz was released.

In 2014 he composed “Freedom” – musical work for choir, orchestra and jazz trio, commissioned by the President of Poland Bronisław Komorowski, which was performed on 4 June 2014 at the Royal Square in Warsaw as part of the celebrations of Polish Freedom and was attended by many heads of states, including the President of the USA Barack Obama.

In 2016 Pawlik released an album with his original works for orchestra under the title “4 Works 4 Orchestra”, including his second piano concerto.

He has been an active lecturer and clinician. He attained a doctorate at F. Chopin University of Music where he has conducted lectures on improvisation since 2007.

He has given clinics and master classes at the Eastman School of Music, Western Michigan University, Cincinnati College of Music, at the IAJE Jazz Conference in Los Angeles (1999) and at the Royal Conservatory of Brussels.

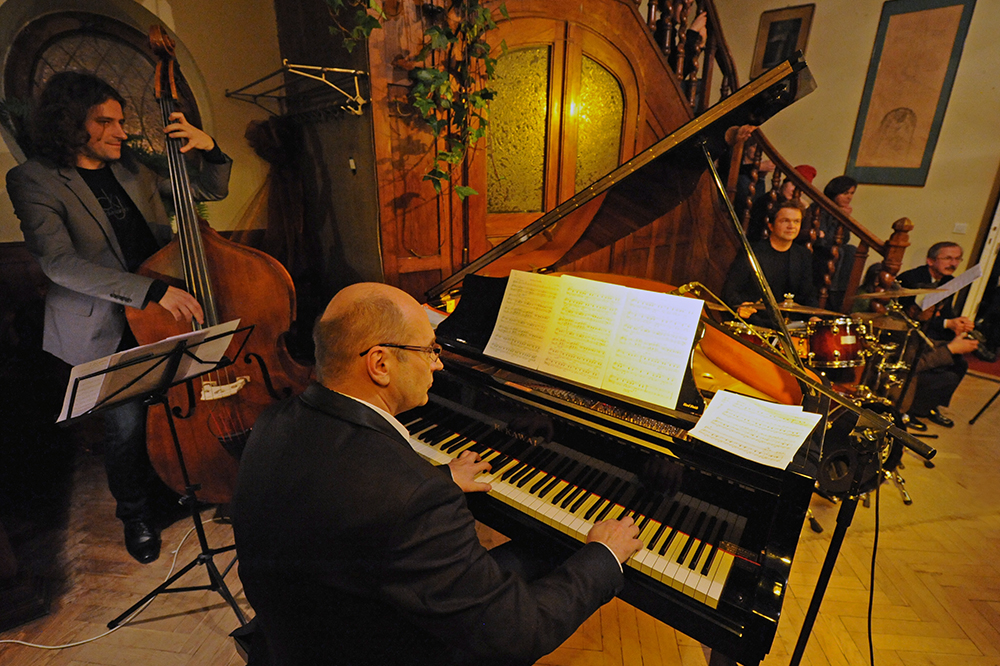
Concert in Villa Stawisko, Podkowa Leśna near Warsaw, Poland - December 2010.

== Honours and distinctions ==
- Grand Prix of the International Jazz Contest in Dunkirk (1984)
- Honorary Citizenship of the City of Kalisz
- Honorary Citizenship of the City Podkowa Leśna
- Coryphaeus of Polish Music Award in the Personality of the Year category
- Fryderyk 2014 for the Jazz Artist of the Year
- Grammy Award (2014)
- Order of Polonia Restituta (2014)
- Angel of Jazz Award at Bielska Zadymka Jazzowa Festival (2015)
- Grand Prix Jazz Melomani (2015)
- Award of the Ministry of Culture and National Heritage (2016)

== Selected discography ==
=== Collaborative albums ===
Title	Album details	Peak chart positions	Sales	Certifications
Title	Album details	POL	Sales	Certifications
Sonety Szekspira (with Elżbieta Wojnowska)	Released: 23 April 2004; Label: Impart; Formats: CD	—		
Nostalgic Journey: Tykocin Jazz Suite (Randy Brecker feat. Włodek Pawlik Trio, The Symphony Orchestra of the Podlaskie Opera and Philharmonic in Białystok)	Released: 25 August 2009; Label: Summit Records; Formats: CD, digital download	—		
Struny na Ziemi (Strings on Earth) (with Lora Szafran, Marek Bałata & Robert Więckiewicz)	Released: 22 May 2011; Label: Pawlik Relations; Formats: CD	—		
Night in Calisia (Randy Brecker feat. Wlodek Pawlik Trio, Kalisz Philharmonic Orchestra & Adam Klocek)	Released: 13 November 2012; Label: Pawlik Relations, Summit Records; Formats: CD, digital download	2	POL: 20,000+	POL: 2xPlatinum
Wieczorem (with Dorota Miśkiewicz, Kuba Badach and others)	Released: 8 October 2013; Label: Agora SA; Formats: CD	—		
"—" denotes a recording that did not chart or was not released in that territory.

=== Soundtracks ===
Title	Album details	Peak chart positions
Title	Album details	POL
Crows	Released: 1994; Label: Koch International; Formats: CD	—
Pora umierać (with Warsaw Philharmonic Orchestra)	Released: 22 April 2011; Label: Polskie Radio; Formats: CD	—
Rewers (with Sinfonia Iuventus & Maciej Żółtowski)	Released: 13 November 2009; Label: Polskie Radio; Formats: CD	38
"—" denotes a recording that did not chart or was not released in that territory.

=== Włodek Pawlik Quartet ===
Title	Album details
Turtles (feat. Randy Brecker)	Released: 1995; Label: Polonia Records; Formats: CD
The Waning Moon	Released: 2 November 1999; Label: Universal Music Poland; Formats: CD

=== Christmas albums ===
Title	Album details
Kolędy Polskie. Polish Christmas Carols	Released: 13 December 2004; Label: Polonia Records; Formats: CD
Kolędy Polskie	Released: 7 December 2013; Label: Pawlik Relations; Formats: CD

== See also ==
- Music of Poland
- Krzysztof Komeda
- Tomasz Stańko
