= Modern Times (Steps Ahead album) =

Studio album by Steps Ahead
- Released: 1984
- Genre: Jazz
- Length: 46:38
- Label: Elektra/Musician

Steps Ahead chronology
Steps Ahead (1983)	Modern Times (1984)	Magnetic (1986)

Modern Times is the third studio album by the American jazz group Steps Ahead, released on Elektra/Musician in 1984.

== Reception ==
Allmusic awarded the album with 4.5 stars and its review by Scott Yanow states: "This outing is very electronic and does not quite reach the heights of Steps Ahead's earlier Elektra album, but it certainly has plenty of spirit and power.".

== Track listing ==
1. "Safari" (Michael Brecker) – 6:58
  Professional ratings
  Review scores
  Source	Rating
  Allmusic	4.5/5 stars
2. "Oops" (Mike Mainieri) – 6:20
3. "Self Portrait" (Mike Mainieri) – 6:02
4. "Modern Times" (Warren Bernhardt) – 6:17
5. "Radioactive" (Bernhardt, Peyton) – 8:49
6. "Now You Know" (Peter Erskine) – 6:25
7. "Old Town" (Mike Mainieri) – 6:19

== Personnel ==
Steps Ahead

- Michael Brecker – tenor saxophone
- Mike Mainieri – vibraphone, synthesizer vibes, marimba, synthesizer, percussion
- Warren Bernhardt – keyboard
- Eddie Gómez – bass
- Peter Erskine – drums
