= Magnetic (Steps Ahead album) =

Studio album by Steps Ahead
- Released: 1986
- Genre: Jazz, jazz fusion
- Label: Elektra/Musician

Steps Ahead chronology
Modern Times (1984)	Magnetic (1986)	N.Y.C (1989)

Magnetic is the fourth studio album by American jazz fusion group Steps Ahead, released in 1986 on Elektra/Musician.

== Reception ==
Professional ratings
Review scores
Source	Rating
AllMusic	3/5 stars

AllMusic awarded Magnetic 3 stars. AllMusic reviewer Paul Kohler described Magnetic as the final Steps Ahead recording to feature Michael Brecker, noting that the album finds the group expanding its use of electronic instruments and studio-based synthesis. He highlighted Brecker's performance on the Akai EWI (electronic wind instrument), characterising its use on the album as particularly striking within the context of the band's evolving fusion style.

== Track listing ==
1. "Trains" (Mike Mainieri)
2. "Beirut" ( Chuck Loeb, Michael Brecker, Mike Mainieri, Peter Erskine, Victor Bailey)
3. "Cajun" (Michael Brecker)
4. "In A Sentimental Mood" (Duke Ellington)
5. "Magnetic Love" (Mike Mainieri, Scott Martin)
6. "Sumo" (Michael Brecker)
7. "All The Tea In China" (Peter Erskine)
8. "Something I Said" (Peter Erskine)
9. "Reprise (Magnetic Love)" (Mike Mainieri, Scott Martin)

== Personnel ==
Steps Ahead

- Mike Mainieri – vibraphone, synth vibes, keyboards
- Michael Brecker – tenor saxophone, EWI
- Peter Erskine – drums
- Victor Bailey – electric bass
- Hiram Bullock – electric guitar
- Chuck Loeb – acoustic guitar, electric guitar, guitar synthesizer

Additional musicians

- Kenny Kirkland – keyboards, synthesizer
- Warren Bernhardt – piano, keyboards
- Scott Martin – synthesizer, programming
- Phil Ashley – synthesizer, sequencing
- Robby Kilgore – synthesizer programming
- Jimmy Bralower – drum programming
- Paul Jackson Jr. – electric guitar
- Dianne Reeves – lead vocals ("Magnetic Love")
- Diva Gray – backing vocals
- Janis Pendarvis – backing vocals
- Jocelyn Brown – backing vocals

Production

- Mike Mainieri – producer
- Steps Ahead – co-producers
- Malcolm Pollack – engineer, mixing
- Neil Dorfsman – engineer
- James Farber – engineer, mixing
- Tom Lord-Alge – mixing
- Jay Rifkin – engineer
- Joe Barbaria – engineer
- Andy Topeka – Synclavier programming
