= You Know What to Do (Carly Simon song) =

Single by Carly Simon

from the album Hello Big Man
- Released: 1983
- Recorded: 1983
- Genre: Pop rock; synth-pop
- Length: 4:16
- Label: Warner Bros.
- Songwriters: Carly Simon; Jacob Brackman; Peter Wood; Mike Mainieri
- Producer: Mike Mainieri

Carly Simon singles chronology
"Why" (1982)	"You Know What to Do" (1983)	"Kissing with Confidence" (1983)

"You Know What to Do" is a song by American singer-songwriter Carly Simon. Written by Simon, Jacob Brackman, Peter Wood, and Mike Mainieri, the song was produced by Mainieri and served as the lead single from Simon's 11th studio album, Hello Big Man (1983).

== Track listing ==
7" single

- "You Know What to Do" – 4:16
- "Orpheus" – 3:50

== Personnel ==
- Carly Simon – lead vocals, backing vocals
- Don Grolnick – electric piano
- Mike Mainieri – synthesizers
- Peter Wood – Memorymoog
- Larry Williams – synth flute
- Hugh McCracken – acoustic guitar
- Andy Summers – electric guitar
- Elliott Randall – electric guitar solo
- Tony Levin – bass
- Rick Marotta – drums
- Jimmy Bralower – LinnDrum
- Tawatha Agee – backing vocals
- Marcus Miller – backing vocals
- Fonzi Thornton – backing vocals

== Charts ==
Chart (1983)	Peak position
US Billboard Hot 100	83
US Adult Contemporary (Billboard)	36

== Music video ==
Simon released a music video for the single. It was directed by Dominic Orlando as per a concept of Simon's, and was filmed on location in Martha's Vineyard, at her home and in the surrounding woods in August 1983. The video received moderate airplay on MTV in the autumn of 1983.
