= Greatest Hits Live (Boz Scaggs album) =

Live album by Boz Scaggs
- Released: August 17, 2004
- Venue: Great American Music Hall, San Francisco, California
- Genre: Pop, rock
- Label: Mailboat
- Producer: David Paich

Boz Scaggs chronology
| But Beautiful (2003) | Greatest Hits Live (2004) | Speak Low (2008) |

Greatest Hits Live is a live album by Boz Scaggs. It was released on August 17, 2004 by Mailboat Records.

== Reception ==
Professional ratings
Review scores
| Source | Rating |
|---|---|
| Allmusic | 3.5/5 stars |

Allmusic's retrospective review stated that "Even if it's a byproduct of the associated DVD recorded at the same August 2004 San Francisco gig, this is a lively and professionally performed show that makes up in soul what it lacks in spontaneity." They found the renditions of the songs to be generally strong, particularly the blues-based tracks ("Ask Me 'Bout Nuthin' but the Blues," "Runnin' Blue", and "Loan Me a Dime"). They also applauded the removal of the "rather forced between-song patter very present in the DVD".

== Track listing ==
DISC 1:

1. "Lowdown"
2. "Slow Dancer"
3. "Heart of Mine"
4. "It All Went Down the Drain"
5. "Harbor Lights"
6. "Jojo"
7. "Ask Me 'Bout Nothin' But the Blues"
8. "Breakdown Dead Ahead"

DISC 2:

1. "Look What You've Done to Me"
2. "I Just Go"
3. "Georgia"
4. "Miss Sun"
5. "Lido Shuffle"
6. "Runnin' Blue"
7. "Loan Me a Dime"
8. "We're All Alone"

== Personnel ==
- Boz Scaggs - vocals, guitar
- Drew Zingg - guitar
- Jim Cox, Michael Bluestein - keyboards
- Matt Bissonette - bass
- John Ferraro - drums
- Barbara Wilson, Ms. Monét Owens - background vocals
- Rich Armstrong - trumpet
- Charles McNeal - saxophone
- Recording information: Great American Music Hall, San Francisco, California.
