= Seventh Avenue South (jazz club) =

Club in New York City (1977–1987)

Coordinates: 40°43′49.7″N 74°00′13.9″W

Seventh Avenue South was a jazz club in New York City. It existed from 1977 to 1987.

The Seventh Avenue South was located in Greenwich Village, Manhattan (21 Seventh Avenue South/Leroy Street) and it was founded by the brothers Randy and Michael Brecker. Jazz musicians were performed there included Mike Mainieri, Mike Stern, Chuck Loeb, Bob Mintzer, Steve Slagle, Carla Bley, Hiram Bullock, Wynton Marsalis, David Sanborn, Michael Mantler, Steve Swallow, Al Foster, Kazumi Watanabe, The club was a start-up for the fusion group Steps Ahead, Jaco Pastorius' Word of Mouth big band and the Bob Mintzer Big Band. Some live albums were made in the club: Native Son, Jaco Pastorius' Live in New York City, Steps/Steps Ahead and Mike Mainieri.
