= Little Three (album) =

Studio album by Robin Holcomb
- Released: March 26, 1996
- Recorded: April 7, 1995–April 9, 1995 at The Recital Hall, Purchase, New York
- Genre: Folk
- Length: 45:09
- Label: Nonesuch
- Producer: Judith Sherman

Robin Holcomb chronology
Rockabye (1992)	Little Three (1996)	The Big Time (2002)

Professional ratings
Review scores
Source	Rating
AllMusic	4.5/5 stars

Little Three is an album by Robin Holcomb, released in 1996.

== Critical reception ==
The Village Voice called the album "both a return to the kind of rigorous composition Holcomb started out in and a proud shrug in the direction of pop accessibility." The New York Times noted that "simple religious and folk tunes coexist with the more complicated harmonies of impressionism." The Gazette wrote: "Unclassifiable 'serious' music for piano and occasional voice—Satie impressionism, American expressionism, Stephen Foster-like folk, and all of it beautiful, balanced and wise."

== Track listing ==
All tracks are written by Robin Holcomb.

No.	Title	Length
1.	"Wherein Lies the Good"	13:48
2.	"Processional"	1:44
3.	"The Graveyard Song"	4:25
4.	"Tiny Sisters"	17:29
5.	"The Impulse"	2:42
6.	"Little Three"	3:05
7.	"The Window"	1:56

== Personnel ==
- William Clift – photography
- Johnny Costa – art direction, design
- Marion Ettlinger – photography
- Robin Holcomb – vocals, piano
- Brian Lee – mastering
- Bob Ludwig – mastering
- Judith Sherman – production
- Jeanne Velonis – engineering
- Paul Zinman – engineering
