= Kissing with Confidence =

Single by Carly Simon and Will Powers

from the album Dancing for Mental Health
- Released: 1983
- Recorded: 1983
- Genre: Pop
- Length: 3:54
- Songwriters: Goldsmith; Jacob Brackman; Nile Rodgers; Todd Rundgren; Steve Winwood

Carly Simon singles chronology
"You Know What to Do" (1983)	"Kissing with Confidence" (1983)	"Tired of Being Blonde" (1985)

Will Powers singles chronology
"Kissing with Confidence" (1983)	"Adventures in Success" (1983)

Music video
- "Kissing with Confidence" on YouTube

"Kissing with Confidence" is a song by Will Powers (the stage name/persona of photographer-turned-singer Lynn Goldsmith) from her 1983 album Dancing for Mental Health. It was written by Goldsmith, Jacob Brackman, Nile Rodgers, Todd Rundgren, and Steve Winwood. Will Powers is portrayed by Goldsmith in spoken word, with her voice altered in pitch to sound like a man. Carly Simon is the uncredited lead singer.

Mixed by Rundgren, it was released as a single in the UK, peaking at No. 17 on the UK Singles Chart. It also peaked at No. 50 in Australia.

== Track listings and formats ==
7" single

- "Kissing with Confidence" – 3:54
- "All thru History" – 4:08

12" single

- "Kissing with Confidence" (extended version) – 5:31
- "Kissing with Confidence" (dub version) – 6:40

== Credits ==
- T. Bailey – composer
- Jacob Brackman – composer
- Lynn Goldsmith – composer, producer, vocals
- Will Powers – primary artist
- Nile Rodgers – composer
- Terry Rundgren – composer
- Todd Rundgren – mixing
- Carly Simon – vocals
- Steven Stanley – mixing
- Steve Winwood – composer

== Charts ==
Chart (1983)	Peak position
Australia (Kent Music Report)	50
United Kingdom (Official Charts Company)	17
Netherlands (Single Top 100)	45
Belgium (Ultratop 50 Flanders)	28
Ireland (IRMA)	18
