= Hello Big Man =

Studio album by Carly Simon
- Released: August 31, 1983
- Recorded: 1982–1983
- Studios: Power Station (New York City, New York); The Village Recorder (Los Angeles, California); Ocean Way Recording (Hollywood, California)
- Genres: Rock, reggae
- Length: 38:57
- Label: Warner Bros.
- Producer: Mike Mainieri

Carly Simon chronology
Torch (1981)	Hello Big Man (1983)	Spoiled Girl (1985)

Singles from Hello Big Man
- 1. "You Know What to Do" Released: 1983; 2. "Hello Big Man" Released: 1983

Hello Big Man is the 11th studio album by American singer-songwriter Carly Simon, released by Warner Bros. Records, on August 31, 1983.

The album was Simon's last for Warner Bros. (and for what became the Warner Music Group, having also spent time with Elektra Records), as it was a commercial disappointment upon release, despite a positive reception from critics. The album featured Sly Dunbar and Robbie Shakespeare on a number of tracks, including one Bob Marley cover.

The album title refers to the reply that Simon's mother, Andrea Simon, gave to her father, Richard Simon, when they first met. He said "hello little woman", and she replied "hello big man".

== Reception ==
Professional ratings
Review scores
Source	Rating
AllMusic	3/5 stars
Rolling Stone	4/5 stars

Writing in Rolling Stone, Don Shewey called the album "Carly Simon's best in years," stating that she "has returned to the sort of beautiful, folk-based singing and songwriting that originally made the world fall in love with her." He singled out "It Happens Everyday" and the title track as "two of the album's best songs," and also stated "her rendition of Bob Marley's ‘Is This Love?’ is particularly terrific, especially the way Simon's light, floating soprano mixes with Sly and Robbie's exquisite funk foundation."

In a retrospective review from AllMusic, William Ruhlmann called the album "a return to the style of Anticipation and No Secrets after years of following trends -- the songs were romantic, with the erotic edge that had charged much of Simon's best material. The album was typically uneven, but also typically personal and compelling." He also singled out the title track as "a winning account of her parents' courting."

== Music videos ==
The music video for the lead single "You Know What to Do" was directed by Dominic Orlando, from a concept by Simon. It was filmed on location in Martha's Vineyard, at her home and in the surrounding woods. The video received moderate airplay on MTV in the autumn of 1983.

Simon also filmed a music video for the title track and second single, "Hello Big Man", which features photos and film footage of her parents. Simon's mother, Andrea Simon, appears at the end of the video. The video also includes the American actor and singer Al Corley, who had also been featured on the cover of Simon's previous album Torch, and with whom Simon had a brief romance.

The music video for the song "It Happens Everyday" was produced by Music Motions and played in sixty movie theaters during "coming attractions".

== Track listing ==
Credits adapted from the album's liner notes.

Side one
No.	Title	Writer(s)	Length
1.	"You Know What to Do"	Carly Simon; Jacob Brackman; Peter Wood; Mike Mainieri	4:16
2.	"Menemsha"	Simon; Wood	4:39
3.	"Damn You Get to Me"	Simon	3:16
4.	"Is This Love?"	Bob Marley	4:13
5.	"Orpheus"	Simon	3:50

Side two
No.	Title	Writer(s)	Length
1.	"It Happens Everyday"	Simon	2:44
2.	"Such a Good Boy"	Simon; Robbie Shakespeare; Mainieri	4:01
3.	"Hello Big Man"	Simon; Wood	5:29
4.	"You Don't Feel the Same"	Simon	2:43
5.	"Floundering"	Simon	3:46
Total length:			38:57

== Personnel ==
=== Musicians ===
- Carly Simon – vocals, acoustic guitar (3, 6), electric guitar (9)
- Don Grolnick – electric piano (1, 6), synthesized steel drum (2), acoustic piano (3), organ (4, 10)
- Mike Mainieri – synthesizers (1, 5), chimes (2), marimba (2), acoustic piano (5), bass guitar (5), additional synthesizers (8)
- Peter Wood – Memorymoog (1, 6, 8, 10), acoustic piano (2, 8)
- Larry Williams – synthesized flutes (1)
- Rob Mounsey – Fairlight programming (2)
- Hugh McCracken – acoustic guitar (1, 6, 8), electric guitar (2, 3, 8, 10)
- Andy Summers – electric guitar (1)
- Elliott Randall – electric guitar solo (1)
- Eric Gale – electric guitar (4, 7)
- Jimmy Ryan – acoustic guitar (5)
- Dean Parks – electric guitar (6)
- Sid McGinnis – electric guitar (7)
- Tony Levin – bass guitar (1–3, 6, 9, 10)
- Robbie Shakespeare – bass guitar (4, 7)
- Marcus Miller – bass guitar (8)
- Rick Marotta – drums (1–3, 6, 8, 10), cymbals (5), tom tom (5)
- Jimmy Bralower – LinnDrum (1, 5, 9)
- Sly Dunbar – drums (4, 7)
- Errol "Crusher" Bennett – percussion (4, 7, 10)
- Lou Marini – alto saxophone (4)
- David Sanborn – alto saxophone (8)
- Ronnie Cuber – baritone saxophone (4)
- Michael Brecker – tenor saxophone (4)
- Jon Faddis – trumpet (4)
- Alan Rubin – trumpet (4)

Music arrangements

- Rob Mounsey – BGV arrangements (2)
- Marty Paich – string arrangements (3, 6)
- Leon Pendarvis – horn arrangements (4)

Background vocalists

- Carly Simon – backing vocals (1–4, 7–9)
- Tawatha Agee – backing vocals (1, 4)
- Marcus Miller – backing vocals (1, 4)
- Fonzi Thornton – backing vocals (1, 4)
- Hugh Taylor – backing vocals (2, 3)
- Kate Taylor – backing vocals (2, 3)
- Lynn Goldsmith – backing vocals (2)
- Lucy Simon – backing vocals (2)
- Robbie Shakespeare – backing vocals (7)

Kids vocals on "Menemsha"

- Julie Levine
- Ben Taylor
- Sally Taylor
- Elizabeth Witham
- Rachel Zabar

=== Production ===
- Mike Mainieri – producer
- Neil Dorfsman – recording
- Scott Litt – recording
- James Farber – additional recording
- Jeff Hendrickson – additional recording
- Gary Starr – additional recording
- John Wright – additional recording, assistant engineer
- Bob Schwall – technical support
- Frank Filipetti – mixing at Right Track Recording (New York, NY)
- Moira Marquis – mix assistant
- Bill Miranda – mix assistant
- Christine Martin – production coordinator
- Paula Greif – art direction
- Lynn Kohlman – front cover photography
- Peter Simon – inside sleeve photography
- Arlyne Rothberg – management

== Charts ==
Chart (1983)	Peak position
US Billboard 200	69
US Cash Box Top 100 Albums	83
