= Robin Holcomb (album) =

Studio album by Robin Holcomb
- Released: November 19, 1990
- Recorded: Ironwood Studios, Seattle, WA
- Genre: Folk
- Length: 42:29
- Label: Elektra/Musician
- Producer: Wayne Horvitz

Robin Holcomb chronology
Larks, They Crazy (1989)	Robin Holcomb (1990)	Rockabye (1992)

Professional ratings
Review scores
Source	Rating
AllMusic	3/5 stars
Chicago Tribune	3.5/4 stars
Christgau's Consumer Guide	(2-star Honorable Mention)
DownBeat	4.5/5 stars
Entertainment Weekly	B
Q	4/5 stars
Rolling Stone	4/5 stars

Robin Holcomb is the second album by Robin Holcomb, released on November 19, 1990, through Elektra/Musician.

== Track listing ==
All tracks are written by Robin Holcomb.

No.	Title	Length
1.	"Nine Lives"	4:28
2.	"The American Rhine"	3:20
3.	"Electrical Storm"	3:46
4.	"Troy"	4:00
5.	"So Straight and Slow"	4:35
6.	"Hand Me Down All Stories"	5:10
7.	"this poem is in memory of!"	2:57
8.	"Yr Mother Called Them Farmhouses"	3:14
9.	"Waltz"	4:26
10.	"Deliver Me"	6:30

== Personnel ==
Musicians

- Danny Frankel – drums, percussion
- Bill Frisell – guitar, acoustic guitar
- David Hofstra – bass guitar, acoustic bass guitar, tuba
- Robin Holcomb – vocals, piano
- Wayne Horvitz – organ, synthesizer, piano, harmonica, production
- Doug Wieselman – clarinet, tenor saxophone, guitar, acoustic Guitar

Production and additional personnel

- John Caulfield – violin and mandolin on "Troy" and "Yr Mother Called Them Farmhouses"
- Marion Ettlinger – photography
- Jay Follette – engineering
- Lenny Kaye – production on "Hand Me Down All Stories"
- Bob Ludwig – mastering
- Manhattan Design – design
