= Speak Low (Boz Scaggs album) =

Studio album by Boz Scaggs
- Released: September 30, 2008
- Studio: Skywalker Sound (Lucas Valley, California); Avatar Sound (New York City, New York); Meac Studio (San Francisco, California)
- Genre: Jazz
- Length: 52:28
- Label: Decca Records; Gray Cat Records
- Producer: Boz Scaggs; Gil Goldstein

Boz Scaggs chronology
But Beautiful (2003)	Speak Low (2008)	Memphis (2013)

Professional ratings
Review scores
Source	Rating
AllMusic	3.5/5 stars
PopMatters	6/10

Speak Low is an album of pop standards by Boz Scaggs, released in 2008. It peaked at No. 128 on the Billboard 200.

== Reception ==
Charity Stafford of AllMusic says the album "should come as no surprise to longtime fans." She then describes it as "a personal, canny follow-up to 2003's collection of standards, But Beautiful." Will Layman of PopMatters says, "Boz keens, with the occasional Kermit-the-Frogian passage still audible." Christopher Loumon of JazzTimes says Speak Low is "shot through with a haunted otherworldliness that is perfectly suited to Scaggs’ still-mesmerizing, if now enticingly coarser, nasality."

Reviewing for JazzTimes, Christopher Louden wrote, "Five years ago, it came as no surprise that But Beautiful, Boz Scaggs’ first foray into jazz standards, was an unqualified success. And it comes as no surprise that his long overdue follow-up is even better".

== Track listing ==
1. "Invitation" (Bronisław Kaper, Paul Francis Webster) – 5:29
2. "She Was Too Good to Me" (Chet Baker) – 3:55
3. "I Wish I Knew" (Harry Warren, Mack Gordon) – 5:26
4. "Speak Low" (Kurt Weill, Ogden Nash) – 3:46
5. "Do Nothing till You Hear from Me" (Duke Ellington, Bob Russell) – 4:06
6. "I'll Remember April" (Gene de Paul, Patricia Johnston, Don Raye) – 4:05
7. "Save Your Love For Me" (Buddy Johnson) – 5:17
8. "Ballad of the Sad Young Men" (Tommy Wolf, Fran Landesman) – 5:37
9. "Skylark" (Johnny Mercer, Hoagy Carmichael) – 4:04
10. "Senza Fine" (Gino Paoli) – 3:31
11. "Dindi" (Antônio Carlos Jobim, Aloísio de Oliveira) – 3:54
12. "This Time the Dream's on Me" (Harold Arlen, Johnny Mercer) – 3:40

== Personnel ==
- Boz Scaggs – vocals, guitar
- Gil Goldstein – grand piano, electric piano, accordion, arrangement
- Scott Colley – bass
- Alex Acuña – drums, percussion
- Mike Mainieri – vibraphone, marimba
- Shane Shanahan – tabla
- Bob Sheppard – tenor and soprano saxophone, bass clarinet, bass flute, C flute
- Eric Crystal – tenor saxophone
- Aaron Heick – bass flute
- Lou Marini – bass flute
- Lawrence Feldman – alto flute
- Joyce Hammann – violin
- Laura Seaton – violin
- Lois Martin – viola
- Richard Locker – cello
- Carol Robbins – harp

=== Production ===
- Boz Scaggs – producer
- Gil Goldstein – producer
- Craig Fruin – executive producer
- Chris Tabarez – mixing, engineer
- Dann Thompson – engineer
- Mike Pela – engineer
- Steve Rodby – engineer
- Geoff Countryman – engineer
- Leonard Hospidor – engineer
- Jay Newland – engineer
- Michael Rodriguez – mixing, engineer
- Ryan Doordan – engineer
- Justin Gerrish – engineer
- Danny Kopelson – mixing
- James Minchin III – photography
- Rebecca Meek – design
- Fanny Gotschall – art direction

== Chart positions ==
Year	Chart	Position
2008	Billboard 200	128
2008	Billboard Top Jazz Albums	2
