= My New Boyfriend =

Single by Carly Simon

from the album Spoiled Girl
- B-side: "The Wives Are In Connecticut"
- Released: 1985
- Recorded: 1985
- Genre: Pop
- Length: 4:19
- Label: Epic
- Songwriter: Carly Simon
- Producer: Paul Samwell-Smith

Carly Simon singles chronology
"Tired of Being Blonde" (1985)	"My New Boyfriend" (1985)	"Coming Around Again" (1986)

"My New Boyfriend" is a song written and performed by American singer-songwriter Carly Simon, and the second single from her 12th studio album Spoiled Girl (1985).

Simon included the single on her 1995 career retrospective box set Clouds in My Coffee, and Sony BMG/Legacy included it on their 2014 compilation release Playlist: The Very Best of Carly Simon.

== Track listing ==
7" single

- "My New Boyfriend" – 4:19
- "The Wives Are In Connecticut" – 4:28

12" single

- "My New Boyfriend" (Remix) - 5:11
- "My New Boyfriend" (LP Version) - 4:19
- "My New Boyfriend" (Dub Version) - 5:49

== Personnel ==
- Carly Simon – lead vocals, backing vocals
- Robbie Kilgore – keyboards, electric guitar
- Jimmy Bralower – drum programming
- Andy Goldmark – backing vocals
- Lucy Simon – backing vocals
- Paul Samwell-Smith – backing vocals
- Ron Taylor – backing vocals

== Music video ==
Simon released a music video for the single which, in alternating scenes, depicts her in Ancient Egyptian times, in the jungle dancing around a roaring bonfire, and in futuristic times with a robot.

Simon also sang a bit of the song in one of her video blogs posted to her personal YouTube account in 2010.
