= Yama (album) =

Studio album by Art Farmer with Joe Henderson
- Released: 1979
- Recorded: April 1979
- Studios: Power Station, New York City
- Genre: Jazz
- Length: 33:01
- Labels: CTI (Japan); CTI 7087
- Producer: Creed Taylor

Art Farmer chronology
Big Blues (1978)	Yama (1979)	A Work of Art (1982)

Yama is an album by American flugelhornist Art Farmer with saxophonist Joe Henderson featuring performances recorded in 1979 and originally released on the Japanese CTI label.

== Reception ==
The AllMusic review calls it "A decent but largely forgettable effort".

Professional ratings
Review scores
Source	Rating
AllMusic	3/5 stars
The Rolling Stone Jazz Record Guide	3/5 stars

== Track listing ==
1. "Dulzura" (Clare Fischer) - 4:09
2. "Stop (Think Again)" (Barry Gibb, Robin Gibb, Maurice Gibb) - 6:48
3. "Young and Fine" (Joe Zawinul) - 6:43
4. "Lotus Blossom" (Don Grolnick) - 8:23
5. "Blue Montreux" (Mike Mainieri) - 6:58

- Recorded at Power Station in New York City in April 1979

== Personnel ==
- Art Farmer - flugelhorn
- Joe Henderson - tenor saxophone
- Don Grolnick, Warren Bernhardt, Fred Hersch - keyboards
- Mike Mainieri - synthesizer, vibraphone, arranger
- David Spinozza, John Tropea - guitar
- Eddie Gómez - bass
- Will Lee - electric bass
- Steve Gadd - drums
- Sammy Figueroa - percussion
- Suzanne Ciani - synthesizer programming
