= Joyous Lake =

Studio album by Pat Martino
- Released: 1977
- Recorded: September 1976; Criteria Recording Studio, Miami, Florida
- Genre: Jazz
- Length: 41:30
- Label: Warner Bros. BS 2977
- Producer: Paul A. Rothchild

Pat Martino chronology
We'll Be Together Again (1976)	Joyous Lake (1977)	Exit (1977)

Joyous Lake is an album by guitarist Pat Martino, recorded in 1976 and released on the Warner Bros. label.

== Reception ==
Professional ratings
Review scores
Source	Rating
AllMusic	3/5 stars
The Rolling Stone Jazz Record Guide	2/5 stars

The AllMusic site rated the album with 3 stars.

In an article for All About Jazz, Ian Patterson wrote: "The group interplay is tight and the soloing exhilarating, with Martino in exceptional, bebop-inspired form. Yet there is a melodicism within these grooves that seems to foreshadow the Pat Metheny Group... the record has stood the test of time, and for jazz-fusion fans anyway, it ranks as one of Martino's best."

All About Jazz's John Kelman remarked: "for those who enjoy their fusion with a stronger tie to the tradition, even as its grooves and colors are irrefutably electric and in their energy, electrified, Joyous Lake remains an undervalued gem in Martino's discography, and one that absolutely merits rediscovery."

Jim Campilongo, writing for Guitar Player, praised the album's "athletic impassioned playing, almost impossible unison lines, and yes, one could use the F word – fusion – to describe it accurately." He stated that Martino's "artistry is captured in spades on Joyous Lake."

== Track listing ==
All compositions by Pat Martino except as indicated

1. "Line Games" - 3:55
2. "Pyramidal Vision" (Delmar Brown) - 7:42
3. "Mardi Gras" (Brown) - 8:56
4. "M'Wandishi" (Kenwood Dennard) - 5:29
5. "Song Bird" - 7:55
6. "Joyous Lake" - 7:33

== Personnel ==
- Pat Martino - guitar, EML 101 synthesizer, percussion
- Delmar Brown - electric piano, Oberheim polyphonic, EML 500
- Mark Leonard - electric bass
- Kenwood Dennard - drums, percussion
