= Gil Goldstein =

American jazz pianist and accordionist (born 1950)

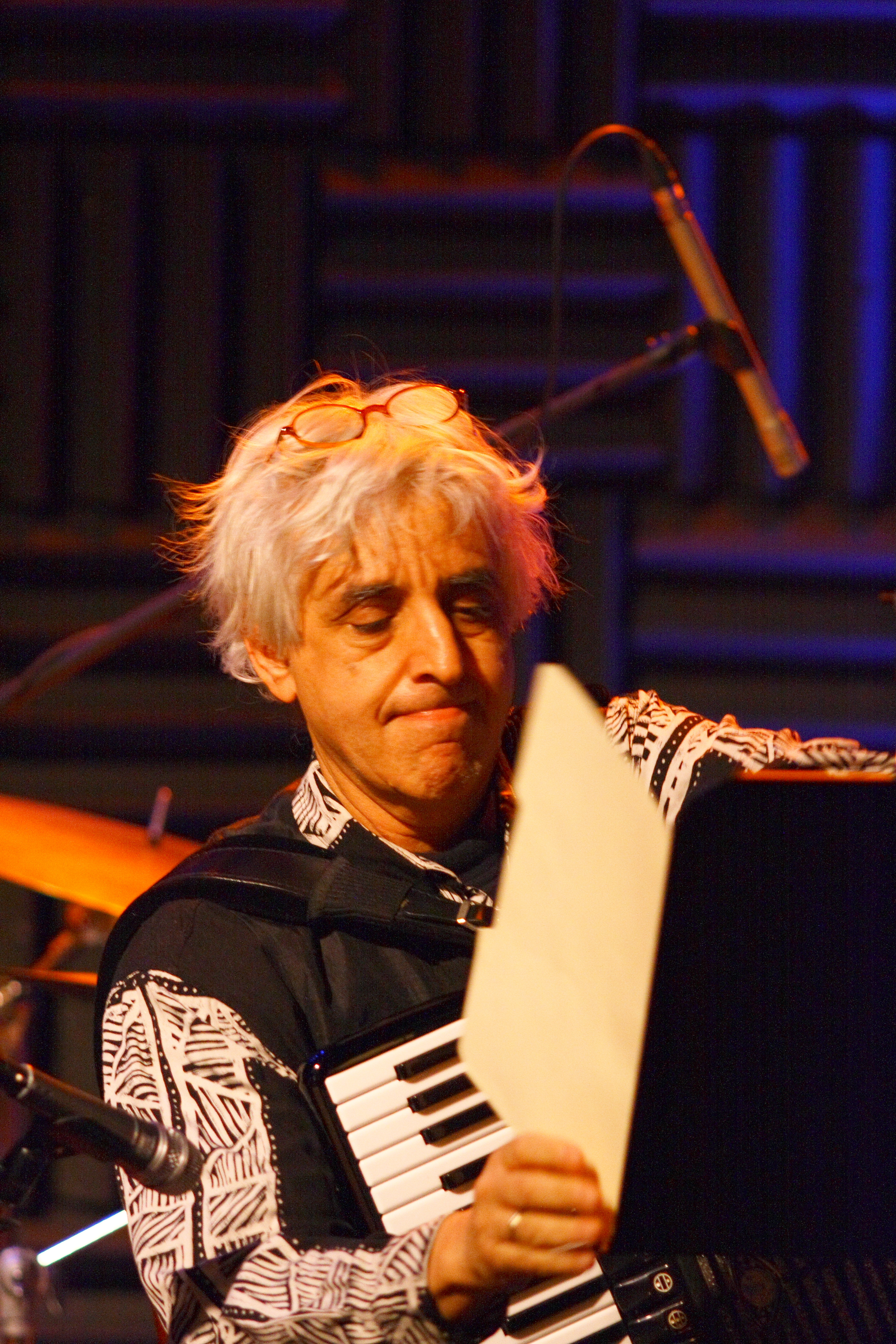
- Photo by Alan Lee

Background information
- Born: November 6, 1950 (age 75); Baltimore, Maryland, U.S.
- Genre: Jazz
- Occupations: Musician, composer, record producer, arranger
- Instruments: Piano, accordion
- Years active: 1970s–present
- Labels: Chiaroscuro, Muse, Blue Note, World Pacific, Centaur, Half Note, Disney
- Website: gilgoldstein.us

Gil Goldstein (born November 6, 1950, in Baltimore, Maryland) is an American jazz pianist and accordionist. He has won 5 Grammy Awards and he was nominated 8 times.

== Biography ==
He began studying accordion at age 5 after noticing it in The Lawrence Welk Show and stating he instantly connected with it personally, but later moved on to cello and piano at age 10. He studied at the Berklee College of Music and by 1973 was working with Pat Martino and Lee Konitz. He started with the Gil Evans Orchestra in the early 1980s and also worked with Wayne Shorter, Billy Cobham, and Jim Hall. He returned to accordion for an album by Michel Petrucciani and occasionally uses it on his solo albums. As an accordionist he toured with Richard Galliano in 2000 but also played piano on the tour. During the 1980s and 90s, he was a member of the group Elements.

In 1990, he toured Germany with the Blues Brothers, temporarily replacing Leon Pendarvis on keyboards.

In 2007, he appeared on the album Your Songs: The Music of Elton John (ObliqSound, 2007) by Italian saxophonist Pietro Tonolo with Steve Swallow, and Paul Motian. The quartet performed jazz arrangements of some of Elton John's most popular songs.

Goldstein composed music for the films Radio Inside (1994) and Simply Irresistible (1999). He performed "I Love Paris" in the film De-Lovely. Two of his Grammy Awards were for his production and arrangement credits for the album Wide Angles by Michael Brecker. He has taught at New York University.

== Discography ==
=== As leader ===
Year recorded	Title	Label	Personnel/Notes
1977	Pure as Rain	Chiaroscuro	With Ray Barretto (congas ~ Courtesy of Atlantic Records), Jeff Berlin (bass), Mary Eiland (vocal), Fred Miller (English horn), Bob Moses (drums, claves), Steve Smith (drums), Toots Thielmans (harmonica)
1980?	The Sands of Time	Muse	Quartet, with Mark Egan and Steve Swallow (bass), Danny Gottlieb (drums)
1980?	Wrapped in Your Cloud	Muse	
1989	City of Dreams	Blue Note	With John Clark (french horn), John Patitucci (bass), Lenny White (drums), Don Alias and Bruce Martin (percussion)
1992?	Zebra Coast	World Pacific	
1997?	Longing	Sunnyside	
2001?	Piano Music of Paul Ben-Haim	Centaur	
2001?	Time Remembered	Melda C	
2001?	Disney Meets Jazz: Tribute to Wall Disney	Avex Trax	
2006	Under Rousseau's Moon	Half Note	With Randy Brecker (trumpet), Chris Potter (tenor sax, baritone clarinet), Mike Mainieri (vibes), Richard Bona (bass, vocals), Don Alias (percussion), Zebra Coast String Trio; in concert
2008?	Disney Adventures in Jazz	Disney	

=== As a member ===
The Manhattan Project
With Wayne Shorter, Stanley Clarke, Lenny White, Michel Petrucciani and Pete Levin

- The Manhattan Project (Blue Note, 1990) – rec. 1989

=== As sideman ===
With Gil Evans

- Bud and Bird (Electric Bird/King, 1987)
- Live at Umbria Jazz (Appecorsa, 1987)
- Collaboration (EmArcy, 1988) with Helen Merrill
- Farewell (Evidence, 1992)

With Letizia Gambi

- Introducing Letizia Gambi (Jando Music|Via Veneto Jazz, 2012)
- Blue Monday (RP Records, 2016)

With Jim Hall

- All Across the City (Concord Jazz, 1989)
- Dialogues (Telarc, 1995)

With Pat Martino

- Exit (Muse, 1976)
- We'll Be Together Again (Muse, 1976)
- Starbright (Warner Bros., 1976)

With Pat Metheny

- Secret Story (Geffen, 1992)
- A Map of the World (Warner Bros., 1999)

With Tiger Okoshi

- Echoes of a Note (JVC, 1993)
- Two Sides to Every Story (JVC, 1994)

With others

- Apostolis Anthimos, Days We Can't Forget (GOWI, 1994)
- Billy Cobham, Stratus (INAK, 1981)
- Eliane Elias, The Three Americas (Blue Note, 1996)
- Miho Hazama, Time River (Sunnyside, 2015)
- Toninho Horta, Foot On The Road (Verve, 1994)
- Abbey Lincoln, Abbey Sings Abbey (Verve, 2007)
- Romero Lubambo, Infinite Love (Big World Music, 1993)
- Wallace Roney, Mistérios (Warner Bros., 1994)
- Bria Skonberg, Indigo (Cellar Live, 2026)

== See also ==
- List of music arrangers
