= Larks, They Crazy =

Studio album by Robin Holcomb
- Released: 1989
- Recorded: October 12, 1988–October 14, 1988 at Baby Monster Studios, New York City
- Genre: Folk
- Length: 48:53
- Label: Sound Aspects
- Producer: Wayne Horvitz

Robin Holcomb chronology
Larks, They Crazy (1989)	Robin Holcomb (1990)

Professional ratings
Review scores
Source	Rating
Allmusic	4/5 stars

Larks, They Crazy is the debut album of Robin Holcomb, released in 1989 through Sound Aspects Records.

== Track listing ==
All tracks are written by Robin Holcomb.

No.	Title	Length
1.	"New"	4:12
2.	"Larks, They Are Crazy"	5:02
3.	"The Natural World"	4:23
4.	"Thirds"	7:48
5.	"Tala/Davenport"	3:25
6.	"Continuity"	4:34
7.	"Marking"	2:32
8.	"March"	4:50
9.	"Dixie"	3:52
10.	"Silence in the Square"	5:27
11.	"Solo"	2:48

== Personnel ==
Musicians

- Marty Ehrlich – bass clarinet, alto saxophone, soprano saxophone
- David Hofstra – bass guitar, tuba
- Robin Holcomb – piano, vocals
- Wayne Horvitz – Yamaha DX7, sampler, production
- Bobby Previte – drums
- Doug Wieselman – clarinet, tenor saxophone

Production and additional personnel

- Steve Burgh – engineering
- Tom Chargin – photography
- Harold Vits – design
