= Steps Ahead =

American jazz fusion group

- Origin: New York City
- Genre: Jazz fusion
- Years active: 1979–present
- Labels: Better Days, Elektra/Musician, NYC, Jazzline
- Members: Mike Mainieri; Bill Evans; Steve Smith; Tom Kennedy
- Past members: Michael Brecker; Don Grolnick; Chuck Loeb; Eliane Elias; Bob Berg; Warren Bernhardt; Bendik Hofseth; Rachel Z; Jimi Tunnell; Mike Stern; Steve Khan; Eddie Gómez; Darryl Jones; Tony Levin; Jeff Andrews; Victor Bailey; Marc Johnson; Steve Gadd; Peter Erskine; Dennis Chambers; Donny McCaslin; Bryan Baker

Steps Ahead is an American jazz fusion group.

== History ==
The group arose out of spontaneous musical performances at Seventh Avenue South, a jazz club in New York City owned by saxophonist Michael Brecker and trumpeter brother Randy Brecker. The first three albums were released under the name Steps on Better Days records, a subsidiary lable of Nippon Columbia in Japan. The group's name changed to Steps Ahead prior to its 1983 self-titled album on Elektra/Musician.

Vibraphonist Mike Mainieri appeared on all Steps and Steps Ahead recordings. Mainieri has also produced several of the group's albums, four of which were released on his NYC Records label. The shifting roster of the other bandmembers has included saxophonists Michael Brecker, Bob Berg, Bendik Hofseth, Bill Evans, Ernie Watts, and Donny McCaslin; pianists Don Grolnick, Eliane Elias, Warren Bernhardt and Rachel Z; guitarists Mike Stern, Chuck Loeb, and Steve Khan; bassists Eddie Gomez, Darryl Jones, Tony Levin, Victor Bailey, Richard Bona, and Marc Johnson; and drummers Steve Gadd, Peter Erskine, Steve Smith, and Dennis Chambers.

The group was most active during the late 1970s and 1980s, and intermittently active during the 1990s. It also reunited for concerts in the mid-2000s.

== Discography ==
=== As Steps ===
- Smokin' in the Pit (Better Days, 1981) – recorded live in 1979
- Step by Step (Better Days, 1981) – recorded in 1980
- Paradox: Live at Seventh Avenue South (Better Days, 1982) – recorded in 1981

=== As Steps Ahead ===
- Steps Ahead (Elektra/Musician, 1983)
- Modern Times (Elektra/Musician, 1984)
- Magnetic (Elektra, 1986)
- N.Y.C. (Capitol/Intuition, 1989)
- Yin-Yang (NYC, 1992)
- Live in Tokyo 1986 (NYC, 1994)
- Vibe (NYC, 1995)
- Holding Together (NYC, 2002) [2CD] – live rec. 1999
- Steppin' Out with WDR Big Band (Jazzline, 2016)

== Members ==
=== Current members ===
- Mike Stern - guitar (1999–present)
- Mike Mainieri - vibraphone (1979–present)
- Eliane Elias - keyboard (1983-1985;1992–present)
- Eddie Gomez - bass (1979-2002;2016–present)
- Steve Smith - drums (1996–present)
