= We'll Be Together Again (Pat Martino album) =

Studio album by Pat Martino
- Released: 1976
- Recorded: 1976
- Genre: Jazz
- Length: 44:32
- Label: Muse; MR 5090
- Producer: Ed Freeman

Pat Martino chronology
Starbright (1976)	We'll Be Together Again (1976)	Joyous Lake (1977)

We'll Be Together Again is an album by guitarist Pat Martino which was recorded in 1976 and first released on the Muse label.

== Reception ==
Professional ratings
Review scores
Source	Rating
Allmusic	4.5/5 stars
The Rolling Stone Jazz Record Guide	3/5 stars

In his review on Allmusic, Alex Henderson notes that this is "The Philadelphia guitarist was also very much at the height of his creative powers -- a fact that's hard to miss on this excellent session... Martino's lyricism was never more personal than it is on this album." Bill Milkowski in JazzTimes stated "it highlights the guitarist at the peak of his interpretive powers... We'll Be Together Again shows the guitarist's tender side in a more subdued setting. It sustains a mood of beauty and passion that is positively spellbinding". In an article for All About Jazz, Ian Patterson called the album "the most sensitive and moving playing of the guitarist's entire recorded oeuvre."

== Track listing ==
All compositions by Pat Martino except as indicated

1. "Open Road: Olee/Variations and Song/Open Road" - 15:56
2. "Lament" (J. J. Johnson) - 5:01
3. "We'll Be Together Again" (Carl T. Fischer, Frankie Laine) - 5:05
4. "You Don't Know What Love Is" (Gene de Paul, Don Raye) - 4:46
5. "Dreamsville" (Ray Evans, Jay Livingston, Henry Mancini) - 5:01
6. "Send in the Clowns" (Stephen Sondheim) - 2:46
7. "Willow Weep for Me" (Ann Ronell) - 5:24

== Personnel ==
- Pat Martino - guitar
- Gil Goldstein - electric piano
