= Rockabye (album) =

Studio album by Robin Holcomb
- Released: September 8, 1992
- Recorded: RPM Studios, New York City, NY and Water Music, Hoboken, NJ
- Genre: Folk
- Length: 46:38
- Label: Elektra/Musician
- Producer: Wayne Horvitz

Robin Holcomb chronology
Robin Holcomb (1990)	Rockabye (1992)	Little Three (1996)

Professional ratings
Review scores
Source	Rating
Allmusic	3/5 stars
Entertainment Weekly	A
Rolling Stone	3.5/5 stars

Rockabye is the third album by Robin Holcomb, released on September 8, 1992, through Elektra/Musician Records.

== Track listing ==
All tracks are written by Robin Holcomb.

No.	Title	Length
1.	"Widowmaker"	1:55
2.	"Help a Man"	4:17
3.	"When I Stop Crying"	6:43
4.	"Rockabye"	4:25
5.	"Iowa Lands"	5:02
6.	"When Was the Last Time"	6:10
7.	"Dixie"	3:25
8.	"Primavera"	4:01
9.	"The Goodnight-Loving Trail"	4:22
10.	"The Natural World"	6:18

== Personnel ==
Musicians

- Art Baron – trombone on "Dixie" and "The Natural World"
- Alan Bezozi – drums and percussion on "Help a Man" and "When Was the Last Time"
- Mino Cinelu – percussion on "When I Stop Crying"
- Stew Cutler – guitar
- Danny Frankel – drums, tambourine on "When I Stop Crying", percussion on "Primavera"
- Bill Frisell – guitar on "When Was the Last Time" and "The Goodnight-Loving Trail"
- David Hofstra – bass guitar, tuba
- Robin Holcomb – vocals, piano, Hammond organ on "Rockabye", keyboards on "When Was the Last Time"
- Wayne Horvitz – Hammond organ, keyboards on "When Was the Last Time" and "Primavera", mixing, production
- Guy Klucevsek – accordion on "Iowa Lands"
- Bruce Kurnow – harmonica on "The Goodnight-Loving Trail"
- Marty Ehrlich – tenor saxophone on "Dixie" and "The Natural World"
- Peter Ostroushko – mandolin on "Rockabye", violin on "The Goodnight-Loving Trail"
- The Steeles – backing vocals on "Help a Man", "When I Stop Crying" and "The Natural World"
- Doug Wieselman – clarinet, tenor saxophone, guitar

Production and additional personnel

- David Bither – production
- Joe Ferla – engineering, mixing
- Jay Folette – engineering
- Dante Gioia – engineering
- Bryce Goggin – engineering
- Peter Holsapple – guitar on "Help a Man" and "When Was the Last Time", production
- Mike Krowiak – engineering
- Bob Ludwig – mastering
- James MacMillan – engineering
- Davey Payne – engineering
- John Siket – engineering
- Bob Smith – engineering
- Tom Tucker, Jr. – engineering
