= Desire (Tom Scott album) =

Studio album by Tom Scott
- Released: August 1982
- Studio: Ocean Way Studios (Hollywood, California)
- Genre: Jazz fusion
- Length: 36:59
- Label: Elektra/Musician
- Producer: Jeffrey Weber

Desire is an album by jazz musician Tom Scott, recorded live to two tracks on June 30 and July 1, 1982, in Hollywood.

== Reception ==
Professional ratings
Review scores
Source	Rating
AllMusic	2.5/5 stars
The Rolling Stone Jazz Record Guide	1/5 stars

Billboard magazine called it "predictably broad-based fusion, with nods to contemporary black, pop and rock instrumental styles."

== Track listing ==
All tracks composed by Tom Scott; except where indicated

1. "Desire" - 4:14
2. "Sure Enough" (Scott, Steve George, John Lang, Richard Page) - 4:25
3. "The Only One" - 5:16
4. "Stride" (Victor Feldman) - 5:33
5. "Johnny B. Badd" - 3:51
6. "Meet Somebody" (Ron Panvini, Leata Galloway) - 4:08
7. "Maybe I'm Amazed" (Paul McCartney) - 4:21
8. "Chunk O' Funk" - 5:11

== Personnel ==
- Tom Scott – alto saxophone, soprano saxophone, tenor saxophone, Lyricon
- Victor Feldman – acoustic piano, electric grand piano, Rhodes electric piano, organ
- Michael Boddicker – synthesizers, vocoder
- Buzz Feiten – electric guitar
- Michael Landau – acoustic guitar, electric guitar
- Neil Stubenhaus – bass
- Vinnie Colaiuta – drums
- Michael Fisher – percussion
- Pete Christlieb – clarinet, saxophones
- Jim Horn – flute, saxophones
- Ernie Watts – flute, saxophones
- Dick Hyde – trombone
- Bill Reichenbach Jr. – trombone
- Chuck Findley – trumpet, flugelhorn
- Jerry Hey – trumpet, flugelhorn
- Alex Brown – backing vocals (1, 6)
- Stephanie Spruill – backing vocals (1), lead vocals (6)
- Julia Tillman Waters – backing vocals (1, 6)
- Maxine Waters Willard – backing vocals (1, 6)
- Steve George – backing vocals (2, 5)
- Carmen Grillo – backing vocals (2)
- Richard Page – lead vocals (2), backing vocals (5)
- Carmen Twillie – backing vocals (2, 5)

== Production ==
- Joel Kaufman – executive producer
- Jeffrey Weber – producer, digital editing
- Allen Sides – recording
- Rich Feldman – digital engineer
- Steve Grimmel – assistant engineer
- Hank Sanicola – assistant engineer
- Tom Scott – digital editing
- Jim Wolvington – digital editing
- Doug Sax – mastering at The Mastering Lab (Hollywood, California)
- Kristen Kasell Nikosky – art direction, design
- Norm Ung – art direction, design
- Fred Valentine – photography
- Ron Rainey Management, Inc. – management
