= Dee Carstensen =

American singer-songwriter and harpist (born 1956)

- Born: February 18, 1956 (age 70); Maryland
- Origin: New York City
- Genres: Contemporary folk, New Age
- Instrument: Harp
- Years active: 1993–present
- Labels: NYC, Exit Nine, Blue Thumb (Note: Blue Thumb was owned by Universal, the company later folded in 2005.)
- Spouse: Mike Mainieri (m.1993)

Dee Carstensen (born February 18, 1956) is a New York City-based contemporary folk and new age singer/songwriter who is best known for her harp playing.

== Personal life ==
Carstensen was born on February 18, 1956, in Maryland and later moved with her parents and four siblings to Rochester. She started her musical interest by playing piano when she was 5 years old, and later took up stringed instruments when she was 8. Part of her studies in the stringed instrument family included the harp, which was done with a harpist from the Rochester Philharmonic Orchestra. Carstensen described her relationship with stringed instruments as "love-hate", while she said her upbringing was "classical training" she was also listening to Joni Mitchell, Janis Joplin, James Taylor, and Jimi Hendrix. Carstensen is married to vibist Mike Mainieri, who she says is the "single most important influence on her musical career." She cites this by mentioning 2 separate instances where she would "throw out ideas" and Mainieri offered his constructive criticism for her.

== Career ==
Carstensen's debut came in 1993 with her album Beloved One, which was largely produced by Bob Marlette and included guitar work by Mark Knopfler of Dire Straits. Her second album called Regarding the Soul came out in 1995, and was produced by Neil Dorfsman. In this album Dee integrated her singing, songwriting and harp-playing after "fooling around" with the instrument for a bit. Regarding the Soul was initially released under a subsidiary imprint called "Exit Nine Records" by Mainieri, and was later re-released in 1998 under Blue Thumb. Dee's third album called The Map also came out during this year which was released under a joint-venture agreement between GRP and Mainieri's NYC Records. However, the Gavin Reports release schedule for the Summer of 1998 mentions Blue Thumb instead.

Dee also recorded a children's album, Can You Hear Lullaby (2001), which featured guest vocals Everett Bradley, Curtis King and Julie Dansky and instrumental work by her husband. Dee went back into the studio and recorded a solo album, Patch of Blue, which was released in 2005. Unlike previous work, all eight songs were originals, except Fly Away whose music was co-written with her husband, who played vibraphone on the album. Patch of Blue did not include any guitar work. Instead, it featured Dee's harp and vocals, with backing from the Tosca String Quartet and several woodwind players. Carstensen has been described as using her harp "like a guitar" in her folk/pop compositions.

== Discography ==
Year (release)	Album	Label
1993	Beloved One	NYC Records
1995	Regarding The Soul	Exit Nine Records (Note: re-released in 1998 by Blue Thumb Records.)
1998	The Map	Exit Nine/Blue Thumb
1999	Home Away From Home	Exit Nine/Blue Thumb
2001	Can You Hear a Lullaby	Exit Nine/Blue Thumb
2005	Patch of Blue	Exit Nine/Blue Thumb
