= Spoiled Girl =

Studio album by Carly Simon
- Released: June 1985
- Studios: Right Track Recording, Electric Lady Studios, The Hit Factory and Shakedown Sound (New York City, New York)
- Genre: Rock • synth-rock
- Length: 48:11
- Label: Epic
- Producers: Arthur Baker; Andy Goldmark; Russ Kunkel; Phil Ramone; G.E. Smith; Paul Samwell-Smith; Don Was; Tom "T-Bone" Wolk

Carly Simon chronology
Hello Big Man (1983)	Spoiled Girl (1985)	Coming Around Again (1987)

Singles from Spoiled Girl
- 1. "Tired of Being Blonde" Released: June 1985; 2. "My New Boyfriend" Released: 1985

Spoiled Girl is the 12th studio album by American singer-songwriter Carly Simon, released by Epic Records, in June 1985.

Recorded with a variety of producers in New York, this was Simon's only album for Epic. The album peaked at No. 88 on the U.S. Billboard 200 album chart, and produced two singles: "Tired of Being Blonde" and "My New Boyfriend", with the former making the Billboard Hot 100 at No. 70.

== Reception ==
Professional ratings
Review scores
Source	Rating
AllMusic	2/5 stars

In a mixed review of the album, Rolling Stone wrote "Spoiled Girl is Simon's most listenable album in years. Thanks to production by Arthur Baker, Paul Samwell-Smith and Don Was, there’s enough verve and contemporaneity to the basic tracks so that Simon’s laconic phrasing seems newly energized, while the tracks produced by Phil Ramone and Andy Goldmark manage to convincingly update Simon's old approach. But such studio gloss is no compensation for an album that’s so utterly inconsequential. In the end, as with any other spoiled girl, you just wish she'd be quiet."

The New York Times was much more positive, writing "Carly Simon's first album in two years is a spicy, lighthearted romp of a record in which the 40-year-old singer-songwriter imaginatively comes to terms with the frivolous spirit of mid-80's pop. Nine producers, including the electronic wizard Arthur Baker, worked on the album, whose songs range in style from the kind of catchy folk-pop that has long been Miss Simon's stock in trade to ultracontemporary dance-oriented tunes with electronically tricked-up textures." They also singled out the track "Black Honeymoon" as "the album's darkest and most musically haunting song, a chilling vignette about sexual jealousy elegantly produced in a style that suggests a folkish variant of Steely Dan's pop-jazz by way of Tina Turner's Private Dancer. It is one of the finest cuts Miss Simon has ever recorded."

== Release history ==
Spoiled Girl was released by Epic Records on vinyl, cassette tape, and compact disc in 1985. Both the cassette and CD versions included the bonus track "Black Honeymoon" (originally the B-side of the "Tired Of Being Blonde" single). A second CD release came in the late 1990s under the Sony Music Special Products label, which also included "Black Honeymoon". In July 2012, Hot Shot Records re-released the album as a deluxe edition with four bonus tracks: "Black Honeymoon", the 7" single version of "Tired Of Being Blonde", and two remixes of the track "My New Boyfriend" which were originally included on the 12" version of the single.

== Track listing ==
Credits adapted from the album's liner notes.

No.	Title	Writer(s)	Length
1.	"My New Boyfriend"	Carly Simon	4:19
2.	"Come Back Home"	Simon; Jacob Brackman; Aaron Zigman; Jason Scheff; Guy Thomas	4:22
3.	"Tonight And Forever"	Simon; Eddie Schwartz	4:53
4.	"Spoiled Girl"	Simon; Russ Kunkel; Bill Payne	3:20
5.	"Tired of Being Blonde"	Larry Raspberry	4:46
6.	"The Wives Are in Connecticut"	Simon	4:28
7.	"Anyone But Me"	Simon; Arthur Baker; Stuart Kimball	4:19
8.	"Interview"	Simon; Don Was	4:49
9.	"Make Me Feel Something"	Simon	4:40
10.	"Can't Give It Up"	Simon; Andy Goldmark	3:43
11.	"Black Honeymoon"	Simon; Brackman; Goldmark	4:32
Total length:			48:11

Bonus tracks on 2012 special edition
No.	Title	Writer(s)	Length
12.	"Tired of Being Blonde (Single version)"	Raspberry	4:14
13.	"My New Boyfriend (12" Remix)"	Simon	5:13
14.	"My New Boyfriend (12" Dub version)"	Simon	5:51
Total length:			63:29

Notes

- The song "Black Honeymoon" was the B-side for the single "Tired of Being Blonde" and appears only on the cassette and CD versions of the album, but not on the vinyl LP.

== Personnel ==
=== Musicians ===
- Carly Simon – vocals, synthesizers (7)
- Robbie Kilgore – keyboards (1, 2), electric guitar (1), synthesizers (5, 9–11), strings (8)
- David LeBolt – keyboards (3, 6)
- Bill Payne – keyboards (4), synthesizers (4)
- Stuart Kimball – keyboards (7), acoustic guitar (7), acoustic guitar solo (7)
- Fred Zarr – keyboards (8), synth bass (8), LinnDrum programming (8)
- Andy Goldmark – synthesizers (9–11), LinnDrum programming (9–11), arrangements (9)
- Ira Siegel – guitars (2, 8, 10)
- John McCurry – guitars (3, 4, 6)
- G. E. Smith – guitars (5), guitar solo (5)
- Jimmy Ryan – electric guitar (7), guitars (11)
- Tom "T-Bone" Wolk – bass guitar (2, 5)
- Neil Jason – bass guitar (3, 6)
- Doug Wimbish – bass guitar (7)
- Tony Levin – bass guitar (11)
- Jimmy Bralower – drum programming (1, 5)
- Mickey Curry – drums (2, 10)
- Russ Kunkel – drums (3–5, 7, 9, 11)
- Liberty DeVitto – drums (6)
- William Beard – Simmons drums (7)
- Arthur Baker – Oberheim DMX (7)
- Bashiri Johnson – percussion (7, 8)
- Mallett – percussion (11)
- V. Jeffrey Smith – saxophone (8)

Background vocalists

- Andy Goldmark – backing vocals (1, 10)
- Carly Simon – backing vocals (1–6)
- Lucy Simon – backing vocals (1)
- Paul Samwell-Smith – backing vocals (1)
- Ron Taylor – backing vocals (1)
- John Fiore – backing vocals (2)
- Gordon Grody – backing vocals (2)
- Ula Hedwig – backing vocals (2)
- Lotti Golden – backing vocals (4)
- Kate Taylor – backing vocals (4)
- Rory Dodd – backing vocals (6)
- John McCurry – backing vocals (6)
- Eric Troyer – backing vocals (6)
- Tina B. – backing vocals (8)
- Stephanie James – backing vocals (8)
- Cindy Mizelle – backing vocals (8)
- Luther Vandross – backing vocals (10)

=== Production ===
- Lennie Petze – executive producer
- Paul Samwell-Smith – producer (1)
- Don Was – producer (2)
- Phil Ramone – producer (3, 6)
- Russ Kunkel – producer (4)
- G. E. Smith – producer (5)
- Tom "T-Bone" Wolk – producer (5)
- Arthur Baker – additional production (5), mixing (5), producer (7, 8)
- Andy Goldmark – producer (9–11)
- Frank Filipetti – engineer (1–6, 9, 11)
- David Thoener – engineer (5)
- Dave Whitman – engineer (5)
- Ed Stasium – mix engineer (5)
- Andy Wallace – engineer (7, 8)
- Scott Mabuchi – assistant engineer (1–6, 9, 11)
- Michel Sauvage – assistant engineer (5, 10)
- Mark Russak – assistant engineer (7, 8)
- Ted Jensen – mastering at Sterling Sound (New York, NY)
- Allen Weinberg – cover design
- Duane Michaels – cover photography
- Kin Kirby – hair, make-up
- Tommy Mottola – management, direction

== Charts ==
Chart (1985)	Peak position
US Billboard 200	88
Canada Top Albums/CDs (RPM)	96
Australian Albums (Kent Music Report)	97
US Cash Box Top 100 Albums	78
