= Tired of Being Blonde =

Single by Carly Simon

from the album Spoiled Girl
- B-side: "Black Honeymoon"
- Released: June 1985
- Recorded: 1984
- Genre: Pop
- Length: 4:46
- Label: Epic
- Songwriter: Larry Raspberry
- Producers: G. E. Smith, Arthur Baker, Frank Filipetti, T. Bone Wolk

Carly Simon singles chronology
| "Kissing with Confidence" (1983) | "Tired of Being Blonde" (1985) | "My New Boyfriend" (1985) |

"Tired of Being Blonde" is a song recorded by American singer-songwriter Carly Simon for her 12th studio album Spoiled Girl (1985) for which it served as the lead single.

== Background ==
According to its composer Larry Raspberry, the song was "inspired by...high school[mates]...who [still have] platinum hair...when you see them 14 years later. You think: 'What an expense!' And the song is about a woman who got tired of waiting on the [life enriching] results that the [cosmetic] company promised". "Tired of Being Blonde" had been pitched to Simon by MTV founder John Sykes after John Cougar Mellencamp, who had heard Raspberry perform the song live, suggested it to Sykes as suitable material for Simon.

Recorded in the autumn of 1984, "Tired of Being Blonde", originally set for February 1985 release, would not be released until June 1985. Promoted by a video which was directed by actor Jeremy Irons, the track failed to become a major hit, peaking no higher than No. 70 on the Billboard Hot 100. However, it was more successful on the Billboard Adult Contemporary chart, reaching a peak position of No. 34.

== Track listing ==
7" single

- "Tired of Being Blonde" – 4:07
- "The Wives Are In Connecticut" – 4:34

12" single

- "Tired Of Being Blonde" - 4:07
- "Black Honeymoon" - 4:34
- "Make Me Feel Something" - 4:40

== Personnel ==
- Carly Simon – lead vocals, backing vocals
- Robbie Kilgore – synthesizers
- G.E. Smith – guitars, guitar solo
- Tom "T- Bone" Wolk – bass
- Russ Kunkel – drums
- Jimmy Bralower – drum programming

== Charts ==
| Chart (1985) | Peak Position |
|---|---|
| Australia (ARIA Charts) | 95 |
| US Billboard Hot 100 | 70 |
| US Adult Contemporary (Billboard) | 34 |
