= The Big Time (album) =

Studio album by Robin Holcomb
- Released: June 18, 2002
- Recorded: Studio Litho in Seattle, Washington
- Genre: Folk
- Length: 44:21
- Label: Nonesuch
- Producer: Wayne Horvitz

Robin Holcomb chronology
Little Three (1996)	The Big Time (2002)	John Brown's Body (2006)

Professional ratings
Review scores
Source	Rating
Allmusic	3/5 stars
Robert Christgau	(dud)
Entertainment Weekly	B+
Uncut	3/5 stars

The Big Time is the fifth album by Robin Holcomb, released on June 18, 2002 through Nonesuch Records.

== Track listing ==
All tracks are written by Robin Holcomb, except where noted.

No.	Title	Writer(s)	Length
1.	"Pretend"		4:20
2.	"Like I Care"		4:30
3.	"Sit Right Down"		2:19
4.	"You Look So Much Better"		3:44
5.	"A Lazy Farmer Boy"	Traditional arr.	2:42
6.	"If You Can't Make the Curve"		3:31
7.	"I Want to Tell the Story"		3:39
8.	"Engine 143"	A. P. Carter	5:58
9.	"I Tried to Believe"		4:11
10.	"The Big Time"		3:14
11.	"Tell the Good Friend on Your Left"		4:36
12.	"Lullaby"		1:24

== Personnel ==
Musicians

- Bill Frisell – guitar, acoustic guitar
- Robin Holcomb – vocals, piano
- Wayne Horvitz – Hammond organ, production
- Keith Lowe – bass guitar, acoustic bass guitar
- Andy Roth – drums
- Timothy Young – guitar, acoustic guitar

Production and additional personnel

- Danny Barnes – vocals on "A Lazy Farmer Boy" and "Engine 143"
- Dave Carter – trumpet on "I Tried to Believe"
- Tucker Martine – engineering
- Anna McGarrigle – vocals on "Like I Care", "I Tried to Believe" and "Lullaby"
- Kate McGarrigle – vocals on "Like I Care", "I Tried to Believe" and "Lullaby"
- Steve Moore – trombone on "I Tried to Believe"
- Julie Wolf – vocals on "You Look So Much Better"
