= Exit (Pat Martino album) =

Studio album by Pat Martino
- Released: 1977
- Recorded: February 10, 1976; Blue Rock Studio, New York City
- Genre: Jazz
- Length: 38:55
- Label: Muse; MR 5075
- Producer: Ed Freeman

Pat Martino chronology
Joyous Lake (1977)	Exit (1977)	The Return (1987)

Exit is an album by guitarist Pat Martino, recorded in 1976 and released on the Muse label.

== Reception ==
Professional ratings
Review scores
Source	Rating
AllMusic	4.5/5 stars
The Rolling Stone Jazz Record Guide	2/5 stars

In his review on AllMusic, Scott Yanow notes that "this LP gave listeners a good sampling of mid-1970s Pat Martino... An excellent outing."

A reviewer for Billboard stated: "Bass, piano and drums surround the guitarist... Program of six tracks ranges from frothy bossa nova through Ellington's reflective 'Come Sunday' theme to Benny Golson's semi-classic 'I Remember Clifford' with markedly effective interplay between Martino and the virtuosic bass pluckings of Richard Davis."

== Track listing ==
All compositions by Pat Martino except as indicated

1. "Exit" - 9:23
2. "Come Sunday" (Duke Ellington) - 7:30
3. "Three Base Hit" - 4:30
4. "Days of Wine and Roses" (Henry Mancini, Johnny Mercer) - 4:47
5. "Blue Bossa" (Kenny Dorham) - 4:57
6. "I Remember Clifford" (Benny Golson) - 7:48

== Personnel ==
- Pat Martino - guitar
- Gil Goldstein - piano
- Richard Davis - bass
- Jabali Billy Hart - drums
