= Journey Thru an Electric Tube =

Studio album by Mike Mainieri
- Released: 1968
- Recorded: 1968
- Genre: Jazz
- Length: 41:58
- Label: Solid State; SS 18049
- Producer: Sonny Lester

Mike Mainieri chronology
Blues on the Other Side (1962)	Journey Thru an Electric Tube (1968)	Insight (1968)

Journey Thru an Electric Tube is an album by American jazz vibraphonist Mike Mainieri first released in 1968 on the Solid State label.

== Critical reception ==
Professional ratings
Review scores
Source	Rating
Allmusic	4/5 stars

The Allmusic review by Tony Wilds said "Journey Through an Electric Tube is not likely to be high on anyone's list, just as Mainieri is an obscure vibist. Journey may well be a cash-in on Dave Pike's success with The Doors of Perception and similar works. Journey features excellent ideas and playing and of course Sonny Lester's top direction. ... It is all low-volume, pleasant, and never-abrasive, however. Call it gently experimental, forward-looking without being too forward or pretentious".

== Track listing ==
All compositions by Mike Mainieri except where noted

1. "It's All Becoming So Clear Now" – 5:21
2. "The Wind" − (Mike Mainieri, Sally Waring) – 5:15
3. "Connecticut Air" (Waring) – 2:47
4. "We'll Speak Above the Roar" – 6:16
5. "The Bush" – 2:54
6. "I'll Sing You Softly of My Life" – 4:45
7. "Yes, I'm the One" (Mainieri, Waring) – 0:47
8. "Allow Your Mind to Wander" – 13:53

== Personnel ==
- Mike Mainieri – electric vibes
- Jeremy Steig − flute (tracks 1, 2, 4, 5 & 8)
- Joe Beck − electric guitar (tracks 1, 4, 6 & 8)
- Sam Brown − electric guitar, classical guitar (tracks 2, 7 & 8)
- Warren Bernhardt − piano, organ (tracks 2. 6 & 8)
- Donald MacDonald − drums (tracks 4 & 8)
- Sally Waring − vocals (tracks 2, 3 & 7)
