= Starbright (album) =

1976 album by guitarist Pat Martino

Studio album by Pat Martino
- Released: 1976
- Recorded: July 1976
- Studio: Mediasound (New York City)
- Genre: Jazz
- Label: Warner Bros. BS 2921
- Producer: Ed Freeman

Pat Martino chronology
Consciousness (1975)	Starbright (1976)	We'll Be Together Again (1976)

Starbright is an album by guitarist Pat Martino which was recorded in 1976 and first released on the Warner Bros. label.

== Reception ==
Professional ratings
Review scores
Source	Rating
AllMusic	3/5 stars
The Rolling Stone Jazz Record Guide	2/5 stars

The AllMusic site rated the album with 3 stars. Thom Jurek called it "a startling yet warm and, in retrospect, wonderful recording of originals and covers."

Writing for All About Jazz, Douglas Payne commented: "As always, Martino remains an engaging technical dazzler - as opposed to all those forgotten 70s guitar heroes who thought speed and sound meant good playing. Martino even experiments with guitar synthesizers and other effects... But the strength of the guitarist's melodic personality, particularly during signature solos, is never in question."

== Track listing ==
All compositions by Pat Martino except as indicated

1. "Starbright" - 3:38
2. "Eyes" (Joseph d'Onofrio) - 2:36
3. "Law" - 3:35
4. "Fall" (Wayne Shorter) - 2:04
5. "Deeda" - 3:43
6. "Starbright Epilogue" - 0:31
7. "Masquerada" - 2:53
8. "Nefertiti" (Shorter) - 2:51
9. "Blue Macaw" - 3:03
10. "City Lights" (Gil Goldstein) - 0:55
11. "Prelude" - 6:30
12. "Epilogue" - 1:00

== Personnel ==
- Pat Martino - guitar, synthesizer
- Al Regni - flute
- Joe D'Onofrio - violin
- Gil Goldstein - keyboards
- Mike Mainieri, Warren Bernhardt - synthesizers
- Will Lee - electric bass
- Charles Collins, Michael Carvin - drums
- Alyrio Lima Cova - percussion
