= Will Powers =

Musical pseudonym of photographer Lynn Goldsmith

- Born: Lynn Goldsmith
- Genres: New age; pop rock; pop; comedy; electronic; spoken word
- Years active: 1983
- Label: Island

Will Powers was the stage name used by celebrity photographer Lynn Goldsmith when she created a self-help comedy music album. The 1983 album, entitled Dancing for Mental Health, used affirmations set to music to poke fun at the self-help entrepreneurs who "build the listener's inner self and encourage personal growth through the thought that anything is possible". Will Powers is portrayed by Goldsmith in spoken word, with her voice altered in pitch to sound male.

Key musical collaborators were Jacob Brackman and Steve Winwood. Additional contributors to the recording included Sting, Nile Rodgers, Todd Rundgren, Carly Simon and Tom Bailey. The album Dancing for Mental Health produced two hit singles, "Kissing With Confidence" and "Smile".

== Discography ==
=== Dancing for Mental Health ===
Side one
No.	Title	Writer(s)	Length
1.	"Adventures in Success"	Lynn Goldsmith; Robert Palmer; Sting	3:41
2.	"Dancing for Mental Health"	Goldsmith; Jacob Brackman; Steve Winwood	5:59
3.	"Opportunity"	Goldsmith; Brackman; Winwood	6:06
4.	"Kissing with Confidence"	Goldsmith; Brackman; Winwood; Nile Rodgers; Todd Rundgren	5:25
Total length:			21:11

Side two
No.	Title	Writer(s)	Length
5.	"Will Powers"	Goldsmith; Brackman; Winwood	5:03
6.	"All Thru History"	Goldsmith; Brackman; Winwood; Tom Bailey	3:59
7.	"Happy Birthday"	Goldsmith; Brackman; Winwood	5:17
8.	"Smile"	Goldsmith; Brackman; Rodgers	6:28
Total length:			20:47 41:58

Three singles were released: "Kissing with Confidence", "Adventures in Success" and "Smile".

The album credits "special thanks" to Steve Winwood, Todd Rundgren, Sting, Nile Rodgers, Carly Simon, Sly and Robbie, Jacob Brackman and the Will Powers Supporters: Chris Blackwell, Ellen and Pascual Nieves, Ellen Foley, Andy Cavaliere, Donna Hellman, Bashiri Johnson, Mary Beth Hurt, Maria Vidal Fernandez, Meatloaf, David Sanborn, Steve Stanley, Griffin Dunne, Karen Allen, Warren Beatty, Glenn Close, Ian Hunter and Tom Bailey. Mixed by Todd Rundgren, "Kissing With Confidence" was released as a single in the UK, peaking at No. 17 in the UK Singles Chart. Carly Simon was the uncredited lead singer.
