= Steps Ahead (album) =

Studio album by Steps Ahead
- Released: February 1983
- Recorded: 1982–1983
- Studio: Power Station (New York City, New York)
- Genre: Jazz
- Length: 46:38
- Label: Elektra/Musician
- Producer: Steps Ahead

Steps Ahead chronology
Step by Step (1980)	Steps Ahead (1983)	Modern Times (1984)

Professional ratings
Review scores
Source	Rating
Allmusic	4.5/5 stars

Steps Ahead is the second studio album by the American jazz group Steps Ahead, released on Elektra/Musician in 1983. The group had previously released three albums under the name Steps on Nippon Columbia (Smokin' in the Pit (1981), Step by Step (1981) and Paradox (1982)), with Don Grolnick on piano and Steve Gadd on drums on "Smokin' in the Pit" and "Step by Step".

== Reception ==
Allmusic awarded the album with 4.5 stars and its review by Scott Yanow states: "The music is essentially high-quality funky fusion, with Brecker typically blowing up a storm, Mainieri often playing the synthivibe, and Elias showing some early individuality".

== Track listing ==
1. "Pools" (Don Grolnick) – 11:16
2. "Islands" (Mike Mainieri) – 6:25
3. "Loxodrome" (Eddie Gómez) – 5:26
4. "Both Sides of the Coin" (Brecker, Mainieri) – 6:10
5. "Skyward Bound" (Mainieri) – 4:04
6. "Northern Cross" (Peter Erskine) – 5:49
7. "Trio (An Improvisation)" (Brecker, Gómez, Mainieri) – 7:32

== Personnel ==
Steps Ahead

- Michael Brecker – tenor saxophone
- Mike Mainieri – vibraphone, synthesizer vibes, marimba
- Eliane Elias – acoustic piano
- Eddie Gómez – bass
- Peter Erskine – drums

=== Production ===
- Christine Martin – executive producer, management
- Steps Ahead – producers
- James Farber – recording, mixing
- Dave Greenberg – assistant engineer
- Garry Rindfuss – assistant engineer
- Bill Kipper – mastering at Masterdisk (New York, NY)
- Andrew V. Strevovich – cover painting
- Norm Ung – art direction
- Denise Minobe – design
- Carol Friedman – back cover photography
