= Blues on the Other Side =

Studio album by Mike Mainieri Quartet
- Released: 1962
- Recorded: May 9, 1962
- Studio: Van Gelder Studio, Englewood Cliffs, New Jersey
- Genre: Jazz
- Length: 32:22
- Label: Argo; LPS-706
- Producer: Esmond Edwards

Mike Mainieri chronology
Blues on the Other Side (1962)	Journey Thru an Electric Tube (1968)

Creating Blues on the Other Side is an album by American jazz vibraphonist Mike Mainieri recorded in 1962 and released on the Argo label.

The track B.R. Blues stands for Buddy Rich Blues that had, two months earlier, appeared on Rich's album Blues Caravan, featuring Mainieri on vibes.

Professional ratings
Review scores
Source	Rating
Allmusic	4.5/5 stars

== Track listing ==
All compositions by Mike Mainieri except where noted

1. "Blues on the Other Side" – 3:47
2. "If I Were a Bell" (Frank Loesser) – 5:29
3. "Tenderly" (Walter Gross, Jack Lawrence) – 6:17
4. "B.R. Blues" – 5:03
5. "When I Fall in Love" (Victor Young, Edward Heyman) – 5:27
6. "Waltzin' In and Out" – 6:19

== Personnel ==
- Mike Mainieri – vibraphone
- Bruce Martin – piano
- Julie Ruggiero – double-bass
- Joe Porcaro – drums
