= Warren Bernhardt =

American pianist (1938–2022)

Background information
- Born: November 13, 1938; Wausau, Wisconsin, U.S.
- Died: August 19, 2022 (aged 83) Bearsville, New York, U.S.
- Genres: Jazz, pop, classical
- Occupation: Musician
- Instrument: Piano
- Years active: 1961–2022
- Labels: Novus, Arista, DMP
- Formerly of: Steps Ahead, Steely Dan, L'Image
- Website: warrenbernhardt.com

Warren Brooks Bernhardt (November 13, 1938 – August 19, 2022) was an American pianist in jazz, pop and classical music.

== Early life ==
Bernhardt was born in Wausau, Wisconsin. His father was a pianist, leading him to have early childhood exposure to piano, and he learned some rudiments of keyboarding from his friends. At five his parents moved to New York City, where he began studying seriously under varied instructors. After the death of his father in 1952 he suffered a period of depression and quit music for a time then studied chemistry and physics at the University of Chicago. In that city he was exposed to blues and jazz, which influenced the rest of his career.

== Career ==
From 1961 to 1964 he worked in Paul Winter's sextet, which led to his return to New York. Once in New York, he worked with George Benson, Gerry Mulligan, Jeremy Steig and others. He also developed a close relationship with the pianist Bill Evans, who served as a mentor to Bernhardt. Bernhardt released several solo LPs in the 1970s, and eventually became a member of the jazz fusion group Steps Ahead while continuing to work on solo projects. In 1971, he provided the piano accompaniment on the song "Crossroads" by Don McLean.

Bernhardt released jazz and classical recordings over decades, and is also featured in teaching sessions in both audio and video formats from Homespun Tapes.

Bernhardt toured as the musical director with Steely Dan in the United States from 1993 to 1994, and can be heard on Steely Dan's Alive in America album. He has performed with Simon and Garfunkel's Old Friends tour, on Art Garfunkel's solo tours, and can be seen on the Art Garfunkel DVD and HDTV presentation Across America.

In 2009, Bernhardt reunited with his band from 1973, L'Image, featuring Mike Mainieri, David Spinozza, Tony Levin and Steve Gadd. The group performed at the Iridium Jazz Club in New York City, toured Japan and Europe, and released the album L 'Image 2.0.

== Personal life and death ==
His father, Larry, was also a pianist. Bernhardt's mother encouraged Larry to teach their son to play piano as a toddler. Bernhardt met his first wife, Susan, in the Catskills, they had a son, Tim. Bernhardt's second wife was Jan, whom he married in 1976, they had a daughter, Nicole.

Warren Bernhardt died on August 19, 2022, at the age of 83.

== Discography ==
=== As leader ===
- 1977 Solo Piano (Novus)
- 1978 Blue Montreux (Arista)
- 1978 Blue Montreux 2 (Arista)
- 1978 Free Smiles (Novus)
- 1979 Floating (Arista/Novus)
- 1979 Free Smile (Arista)
- 1980 Manhattan Update
- 1983 Warren Bernhardt Trio (DMP)
- 1987 Hands On (DMP)
- 1990 Ain't Life Grand (DMP)
- 1991 Heat of the Moment (DMP)
- 1992 Reflections (DMP)
- 1993 Family Album (DMP)
- 2003 Amelia's Song (DMP)
- 2003 So Real (DMP)
- 2016 Lotus Night (Warner Music)

=== As sideman ===
With Kenny Burrell

- Night Song (Verve, 1969)

With Art Farmer

- Yama with Joe Henderson (CTI, 1979)

With Tim Hardin

- Tim Hardin 3 Live in Concert (Verve Forecast, 1968)

With O'Donel Levy

- Simba (Groove Merchant, 1974)

With Mike Mainieri

- Journey Thru an Electric Tube (Solid State, 1968)

With Pat Martino

- Starbright (Warner Bros., 1976)

With Gerry Mulligan

- Something Borrowed - Something Blue (Limelight, 1966)

With Jeremy Steig

- Jeremy & The Satyrs (Reprise, 1968)
- This Is Jeremy Steig (Solid State, 1969)

With Steps Ahead

- Modern Times (Elektra, 1984)
- Magnetic (Elektra, 1986) (one track)
