= But Beautiful (Boz Scaggs album) =

Studio album by Boz Scaggs
- Released: May 20, 2003
- Studio: Meac Studio (San Francisco, California)
- Genre: Vocal jazz, traditional pop
- Label: Gray Cat
- Producer: Boz Scaggs

Boz Scaggs chronology
The Lost Concert (2001)	But Beautiful (2003)	Greatest Hits Live (2004)

But Beautiful is an album of pop standards by Boz Scaggs, released in 2003. It reached number one on the Billboard Top Jazz Albums chart in 2004.

== Reception ==
Professional ratings
Review scores
Source	Rating
AllMusic	2.5/5 stars

AllMusic found the album "an entirely pleasant listen" and praised the jazz quartet backing Scaggs, but rated the album as poor, citing Scaggs' "sometimes too casual" phrasing and criticizing his approach as predictable rather than fresh; on the other hand, it reached No. 1 on the Billboard Top Jazz Albums chart, and was a "critical and commercial triumph".

== Track listing ==
1. "What's New?" (Bob Haggart, Johnny Burke) – 4:30
2. "Never Let Me Go" (Ray Evans, Jay Livingston) – 5:06
3. "How Long Has This Been Going On?" (George Gershwin, Ira Gershwin) – 6:07
4. "Sophisticated Lady" (Duke Ellington, Irving Mills, Mitchell Parish) – 5:14
5. "But Beautiful" (Jimmy Van Heusen, Johnny Burke) – 5:36
6. "Bewitched, Bothered and Bewildered" (Richard Rodgers, Lorenz Hart) – 3:29
7. "Easy Living" (Ralph Rainger, Leo Robin) – 4:13
8. "I Should Care" (Axel Stordahl, Paul Weston, Sammy Cahn) – 5:25
9. "You Don't Know What Love Is" (Gene de Paul, Don Raye) – 5:46
10. "For All We Know" (J. Fred Coots, Sam M. Lewis) – 5:30

Bonus Track Japanese Release:

1. "My Funny Valentine" (Rodgers, Hart) – 4:57

== Personnel ==
- Boz Scaggs – vocals
- Paul Nagel – grand piano, arrangements
- John Shifflett – bass
- Jason Lewis – drums
- Eric Crystal – saxophone

Production

- Boz Scaggs – producer, liner notes
- Jeff Cressman – engineer
- Steve MacMillan – engineer
- Michael Rodriguez – engineer
- Chris Taberez – engineer, technical coordinator
- Joel Moss – mixing
- Bernie Grundman – mastering at Bernie Grundman Mastering (Hollywood, California).
- Phillip Andelman – photography
- David Bullen – design

== Chart positions ==
Year	Chart	Position
2003	Billboard Top Independent Albums	10
2004	Billboard Top Jazz Albums	1
