= Robin Holcomb =

American singer, songwriter, and pianist

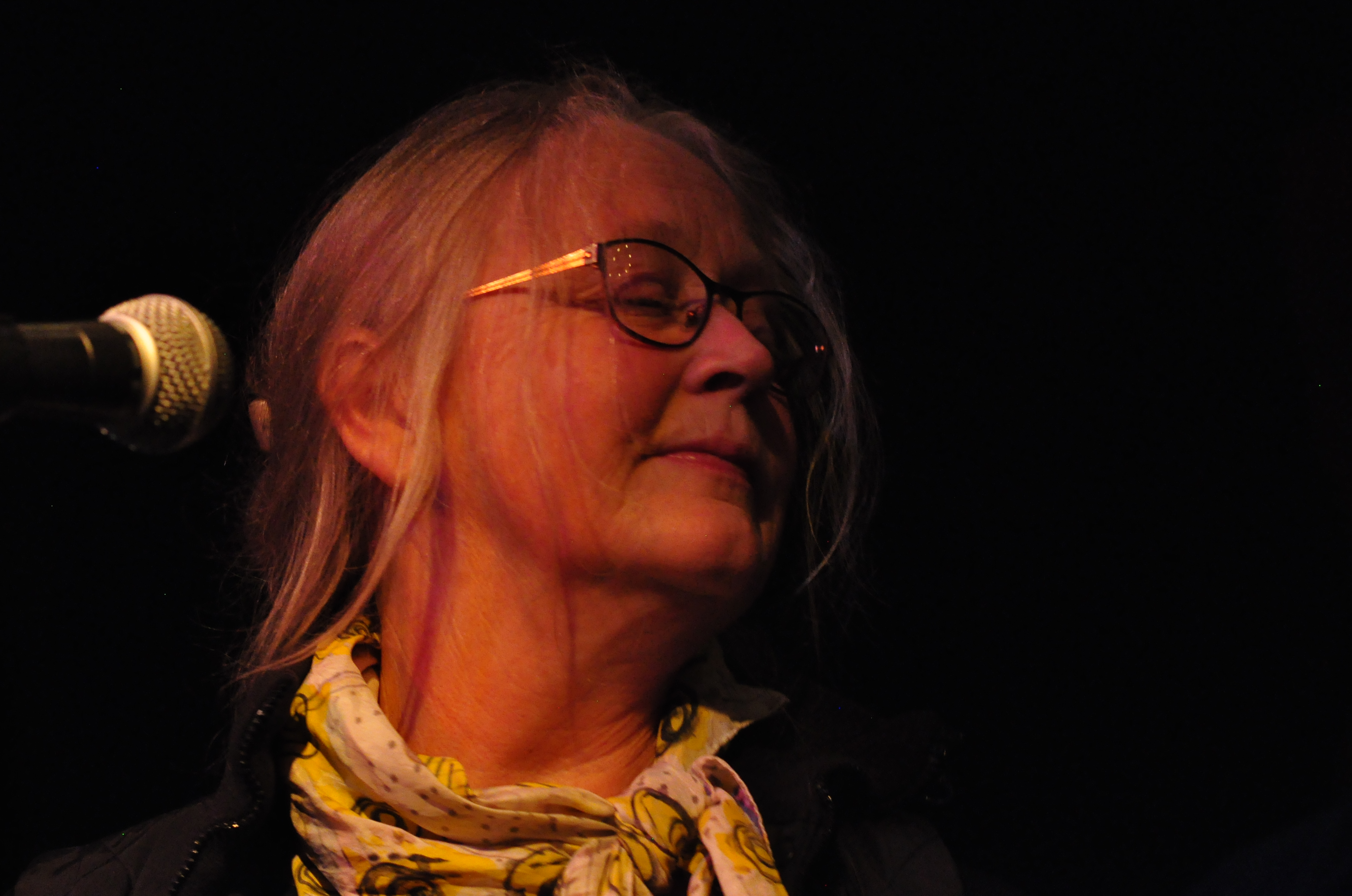
- Holcomb in 2016

Background information
- Born: Robin Lynn Holcomb
- Genres: Avant-garde jazz; classical; folk
- Occupations: Musician; songwriter
- Instruments: Vocals; piano
- Years active: 1980s–present
- Labels: Sound Aspects; Elektra; Nonesuch; Tzadik; Songlines; Westerlies
- Website: www.robinholcomb.com

Robin Lynn Holcomb is an American singer, songwriter, and pianist who combines avant-garde jazz, classical music, and folk music.

The New York Times described her music as "a new American regionalism, spun from many threads – country rock, minimalism, Civil War songs, Baptist hymns, Appalachian folk tunes, even the polytonal music of Charles Ives. The music that results is as elegantly simple as a Shaker quilt, and no less beautiful." Despite her eclectic output, she has said that she doesn't try to "genre mash" intentionally; "it just kind of comes up because it's what's in the air. I am drawn repeatedly to hymn-type harmonies. I was fascinated by Civil-War songs when I was a kid. I come back to those things." She also describes her style as "minimalism without being a minimalist [...] when I write poetry, I go for the fewest words that evoke a lot or let the readers connect the dots, or relate it to their own experience, and the same with music."

Holcomb began playing professionally in New York, in an avant-garde scene that involved her future husband Wayne Horvitz as well as John Zorn, Elliott Sharp, and Eugene Chadbourne. Her work during that period was recorded in the 1989 album, Larks, They Crazy. Her subsequent albums focus more on songwriting.

== Discography ==
- Larks, They Crazy (Sound Aspects, 1989)
- Robin Holcomb (Elektra, 1990)
- Rockabye (Elektra, 1992)
- Little Three (Nonesuch, 1996)
- The Big Time (Nonesuch, 2002)
- John Brown's Body (Tzadik, 2006)
- The Point of It All (Songlines, 2010)
- One Way or Another, Volume 1 (Westerlies, 2022)
- One Way or Another, Volume 2 (Westerlies, 2024)
