= Marion Ettlinger =

American photographer

Marion Ettlinger (born 1949) is a photographer specializing in author portraits. Ettlinger's portrait photography appears on many book jackets. During her long career she has photographed Truman Capote, Tom Wolfe, William Styron, Raymond Carver, Joyce Carol Oates, Sarah Vowell and many more. A collection of her portraits, Author Photo: Portraits, 1983-2002 was published in 2003 by Simon & Schuster (ISBN 0-7432-2734-4).

She has been a photographer for over 35 years, although only during the last twenty years has she focused her work on authors.

Other authors she has worked with over the years include:

- Cormac McCarthy
- Stewart O'Nan
- James Ellroy
- Elizabeth Wurtzel
- George Plimpton
- Jeffrey Eugenides
- Francine Prose
- Alice Munro
- Elissa Schappell
