= Elektra/Musician =

American jazz record label

Elektra/Musician Records
- Elektra/Musician Records logo
- Parent company: Warner Music Group
- Founded: 1982
- Founder: Bruce Lundvall
- Status: Defunct
- Distributor: Nonesuch Records
- Genre: Jazz
- Country of origin: United States
- Location: New York City

Elektra/Musician was a jazz record label founded as a subsidiary of Elektra Records in 1982. The label was headed by Bruce Lundvall and released its first batch of albums on February 12, 1982. The label ceased when Lundvall left Elektra to start EMI's Manhattan Records in 1984. Elektra unsuccessfully attempted to revive the Elektra/Musician label in the late 1980s with acts such as the Gipsy Kings, but the label was eventually absorbed by Nonesuch Records, which also absorbed the label's earlier iteration in 1984.

Elektra/Musician released albums by Joe Albany, Bill Evans, Dexter Gordon, Charles Lloyd, Bobby McFerrin, Woody Shaw, Sphere, Steps Ahead, and McCoy Tyner.

== Selected discography ==
#	Artist	Album	Year	Billboard (Note: Peak position on the Jazz Album Charts, Billboard Magazine.)	Cashbox (Note: Peak position on the Jazz Album Charts, Cashbox Magazine.)
60019	Parker, Charlie	One Night in Washington	1982	28	
60020	Red Rodney & Ira Sullivan	Spirit Within	1982		
60021	Khan, Chaka	Echoes of an Era	1982	11	7
60022	Gale, Eric	Blue Horizon	1982	20	22
60023	McFerrin, Bobby	Bobby McFerrin	1982	41	
60024	Ritenour, Lee	Rio	1982	11	8
60025	Corea, Chick	Griffith Park Collection	1982	35	26
60026	Brown, Clifford & Roach, Max	Pure Genius, Vol. 1	1982		
60029	Hubbard, Freddie	Ride Like the Wind	1982	24	18
60030	Powell, Bud	Inner Fires	1982		
60031	McLaughlin, John	My Goal's Beyond	1982	34	
60042	Material	Memory Serves	1982	32	
60043	(Various Artists)	The Musician's Guide, Vol. 1	1982	41	
60123	Cobham, Billy's Glass Menagerie	Observations &	1982	23	11
60125	Allison, Mose	Middle Class White Boy	1982		
60126	Gordon, Dexter	American Classic	1982	19	17
60130	Sancious, David	Bridge, The	1982	36	
60131	Shaw, Woody	Master of the Art	1982	42	
60136	(Various Artists)	The Musician's Guide, Vol. 2	1982		
60161	Albany, Joe	Portrait of an Artist	1982		
60162	Scott, Tom	Desire	1982		7
60163	Freeman, Chico	Tradition in Transition	1982	31	15
60164	Evans, Bill	The Paris Concert: Edition One	1983	19	15
60165	(Various Artists)	Echoes of an Era 2: The Concert	1982	29	29
60166	Sphere	Four in One	1982	41	
60167	Corea, Chick	Again and Again	1983	15	
60168	Steps Ahead	Steps Ahead	1983	24	12
60175	Smith, Jimmy	Off the Top	1982	5	6
60195	Amram, David & Friends	Latin Jazz Celebration	1983		
60196	Young Lions, The (Note: Wynton Marsalis, Bobby McFerrin, Paquito D'Rivera, John Purcell, Chico Freeman, Craig Harris, Hamiet Bluiett, James Newton, Kevin Eubanks, John Blake, Jay Hoggard, Abdul Wadud, Anthony Davis, Avery Sharpe, Fred Hopkins, Ronnie Burrage, Daniel Ponce.)	Young Lions, The	1983		18
60197	Klemmer, John	Finesse	1983	10	4
60198	Gale, Eric	Island Breeze	1983	35	14
60213	Eubanks, Kevin	Guitarist	1983	32	
60214	Carter, Ron	Etudes	1983	42	
60220	Lloyd, Charles	Montreux 82	1983		
60221	Laswell, Bill	Baselines	1983		
60233	Cobham, Billy's Glass Menagerie	Smokin′	1983	41	15
60237	Allison, Mose	Lessons in Living	1983		
60261	Red Rodney & Ira Sullivan	Sprint	1983		
60262	(Various Artists)	Griffith Park in Concert	1983		29
60264	Tristano, Lennie	New York Improvisations	1983		
60297	Watanabe, Sadao	Fill Up the Night	1983	19	7
60298	(Various Artists)	In Performance at the Playboy Jazz Festival	1984	35	20
60299	Shaw, Woody	Night Music	1983		
60300	Gillespie, Dizzy	One Night in Washington	1983		
60301	Smith, Jimmy	Keep On Comin′	1983	35	
60310	Ritenour, Lee	On the Line	1983	12	3
60311	Evans, Bill	The Paris Concert: Edition Two	1984	37	
60313	Sphere	Flight Path	1983		
60349	Evans, Bill	Living in the Crest of a Wave	1984	42	19
60350	Tyner, McCoy	Dimensions	1984	42	18
60351	Steps Ahead	Modern Times	1984	11	9
60361	Freeman, Chico	Tangents	1984		
60366	McFerrin, Bobby	The Voice	1984	24	19
60369	Morse, Steve	The Introduction	1984	15	6
60370	Getz, Stan & Albert Dailey	Poetry	1984		
60759	Horvitz, Wayne	This New Generation	1987		
60760	Gilberto, Joao	Live in Montreux	1987		
60831	Hemphill, Julius Big Band	Julius Hemphill Big Band	1988		
60843	Frisell, Bill	Before We Were Born	1989		
60864	World Saxophone Quartet	Rhythm & Blues	1989		
60983	Holcomb, Robin	Robin Holcomb	1990		
61088	Sanborn, David	Another Hand	1991	1	
61289	Holcomb, Robin	Rockabye	1992		
