= Lynn Goldsmith =

American musician, film director, and photographer (born 1948)

- Born: 1948 (age 77–78); Detroit, Michigan, U.S.
- Other name: Will Powers
- Education: University of Michigan
- Occupations: Musician; film director; photographer
- Musical career
- Label: Island Records
- Website: lynngoldsmith.com

Lynn Goldsmith (born 1948) is an American musician, film director, celebrity portrait photographer, and rock and roll photographer. She has also made fine-art photography with conceptual images and her paintings. Taschen, Rizzoli, and Abrams have published books on her work. In 1985, she received a World Press Photo award. In the 1980s, she wrote songs and performed as Will Powers. In 2023, she was part of a U.S. Supreme Court case dealing with the limits of fair use concerning a series of Andy Warhol silkscreen portraits based on a Goldsmith photo of the musician Prince.

== Life ==
Goldsmith was born in Detroit, Michigan, in 1948. She attended the University of Michigan, where she graduated in three years magna cum laude with two degrees, in English and psychology. After college, in 1969, Goldsmith worked for Elektra Records. In 1971, she met Joshua White and worked with him as a director for Joshua TV. That same year, Goldsmith was inducted into the Directors Guild of America. In 1972, she directed ABC's In Concert. After directing a documentary piece on Grand Funk Railroad for ABC, she made a film on Grand Funk called We're an American Band in 1973. This led to her becoming the band's co-manager.

In the mid-1970s, she left managing and directing to focus on her photography. Goldsmith founded the photo agency LGI, representing images of famous people in the entertainment industry. During that time, she also wrote songs, performing under the pseudonym Will Powers, and was signed to Island Records. In 1997, Goldsmith sold LGI to Corbis so she could concentrate more fully on her fine art photography and work with the Will Powers Institute.

She chronicled the lives of Bruce Springsteen, Michael Jackson, Bob Dylan, Patti Smith, and the Rolling Stones' stadium tours. Her photographs have appeared on the covers of magazines and have been used for book and album covers.

== Andy Warhol Foundation for the Visual Arts, Inc. v. Goldsmith ==
In 2016, the Andy Warhol Foundation filed a pre-emptive lawsuit in federal court against Goldsmith, who then countersued, citing copyright infringement of a portrait of Prince she took in 1981. The Foundation argued that Warhol's "fair use" of the image was under copyright law because Warhol "transformed" the image.

The Warhol Foundation won in federal court, and Goldsmith appealed and won in the Second Circuit Court of Appeals. The Foundation appealed the decision, and Goldsmith won again. The Warhol Foundation then filed an appeal to the United States Supreme Court. The case was heard on October 20, 2022. On May 18, 2023, the Supreme Court sided with Goldsmith in a 7–2 vote.

== Publications ==
- Springsteen. Sidgwick & Jackson, 1985. ISBN 978-0283992148.
- New Kids. Rizzoli, 1990. ISBN 978-0847813049.
- Circus Dreams. Rizzoli, 1991. ISBN 978-0847814473.
- Marky Mark. Harper Perennial, 1992. ISBN 978-0060950033.
- Photodiary: A Musical Journey. Rizzoli, 1995. ISBN 978-0847818761.
- Flower. Rizzoli, 2000. ISBN 978-0847822584.
- Springsteen: Access All Areas. Rizzoli, 2000. ISBN 978-0789303929.
- Rock and Roll. Abrams, 2007. ISBN 978-0810994058.
- The Police: 1978–1983. Little, Brown, 2007. ISBN 978-0316005913.
- The Looking Glass. Insight, 2011. ISBN 9781933784946.
- Rock and Roll Stories. Abrams, 2013. ISBN 978-1419709586.
- KISS: 1977–1980. Rizzoli, 2017. ISBN 978-0847860128.
- Patti Smith: Before Easter After. Taschen, 2019.
- Music in the '80s. Rizzoli, 2022. ISBN 978-0847872251.
- Bruce Springsteen & the E Street Band: Darkness on the Edge of Town. Taschen, 2023. ISBN 978-3836589932.

== Awards ==
- 1985: World Press Photo award
- 2021: Lifetime Achievement in Portraiture, Lucie Awards

== Gallery ==
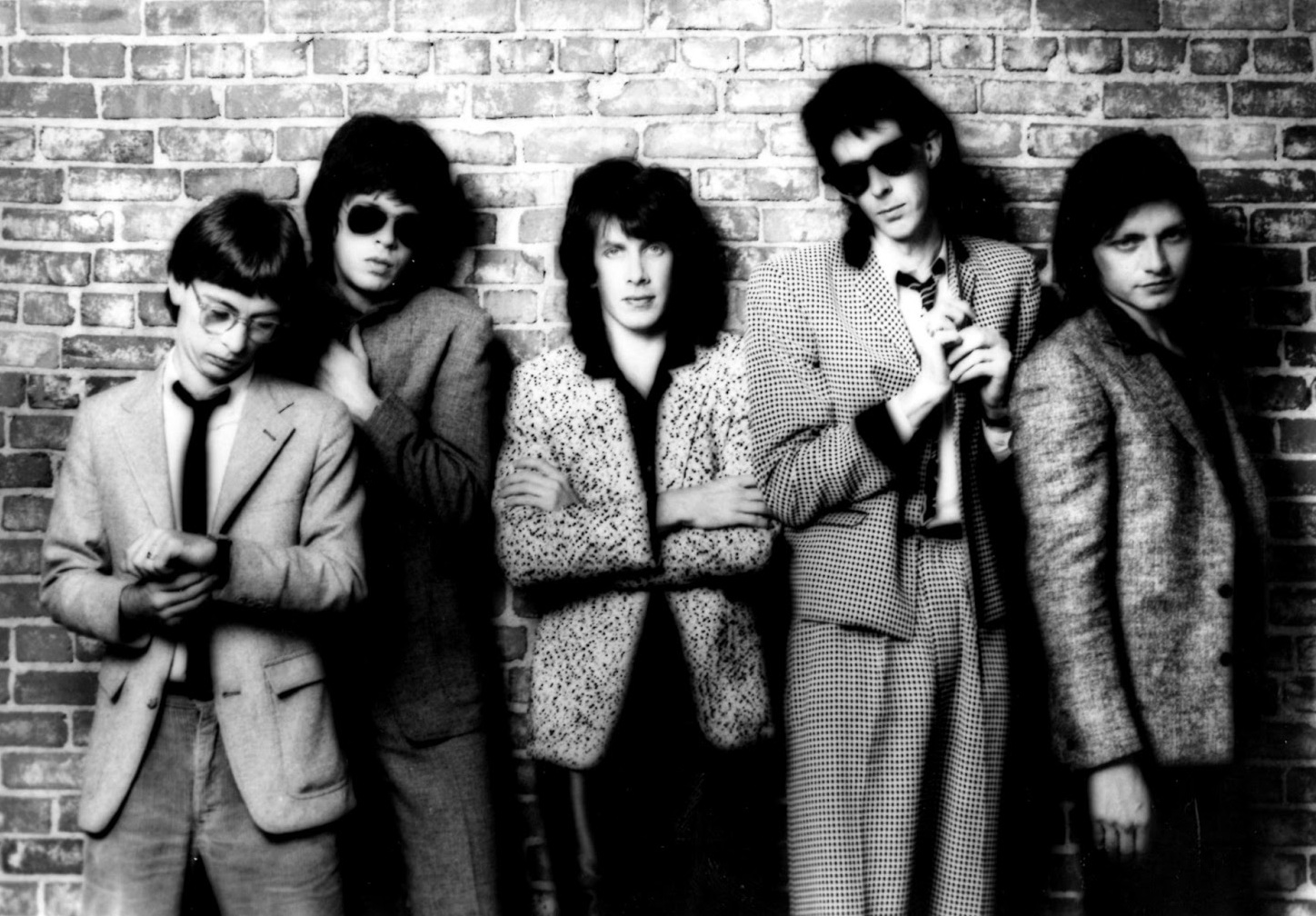
The Cars, 1980; publicity photo for Panorama; Goldsmith for Elektra Records

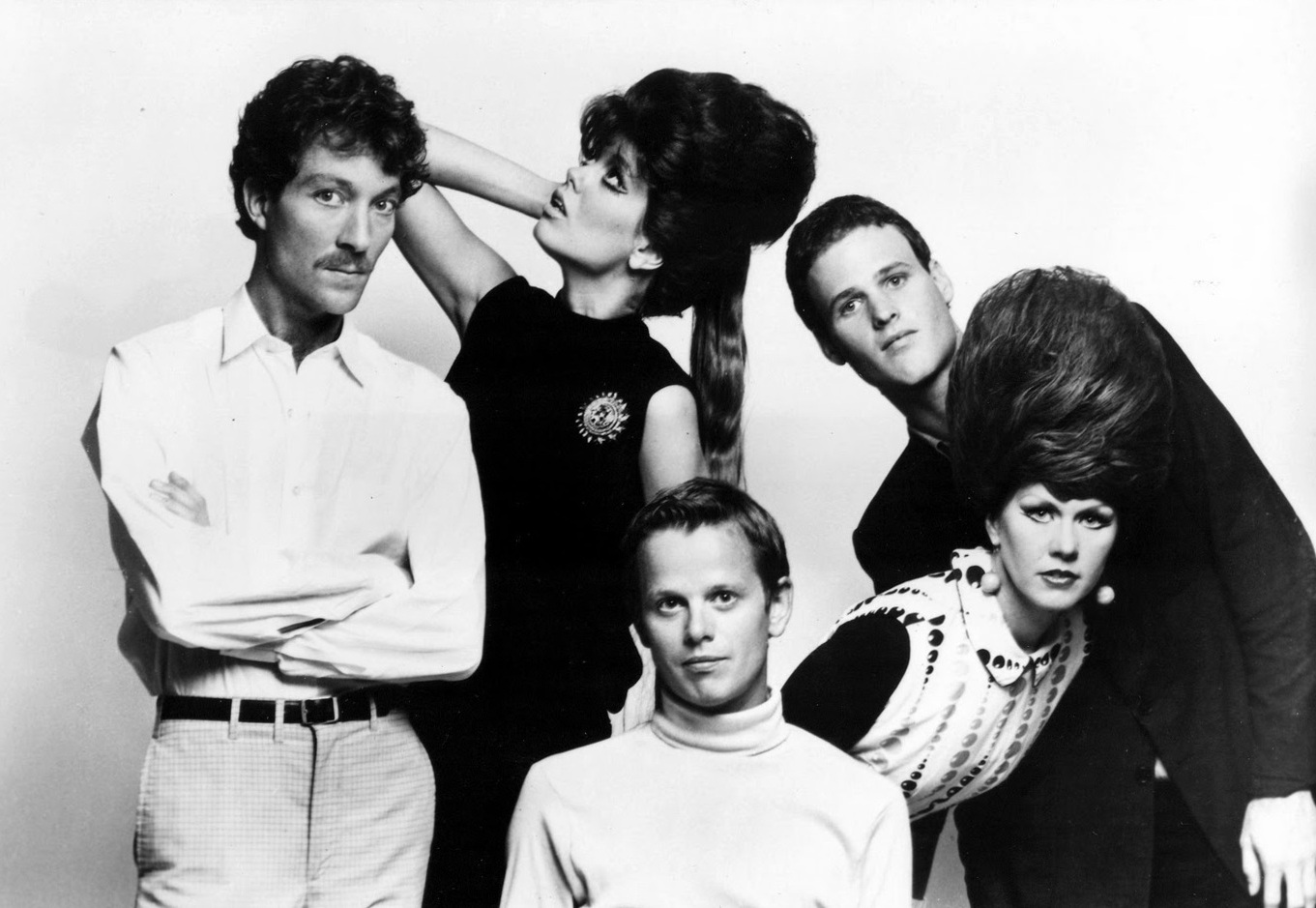
The B-52s, 1980; publicity photo for Wild Planet; Goldsmith for Warner Bros. Records

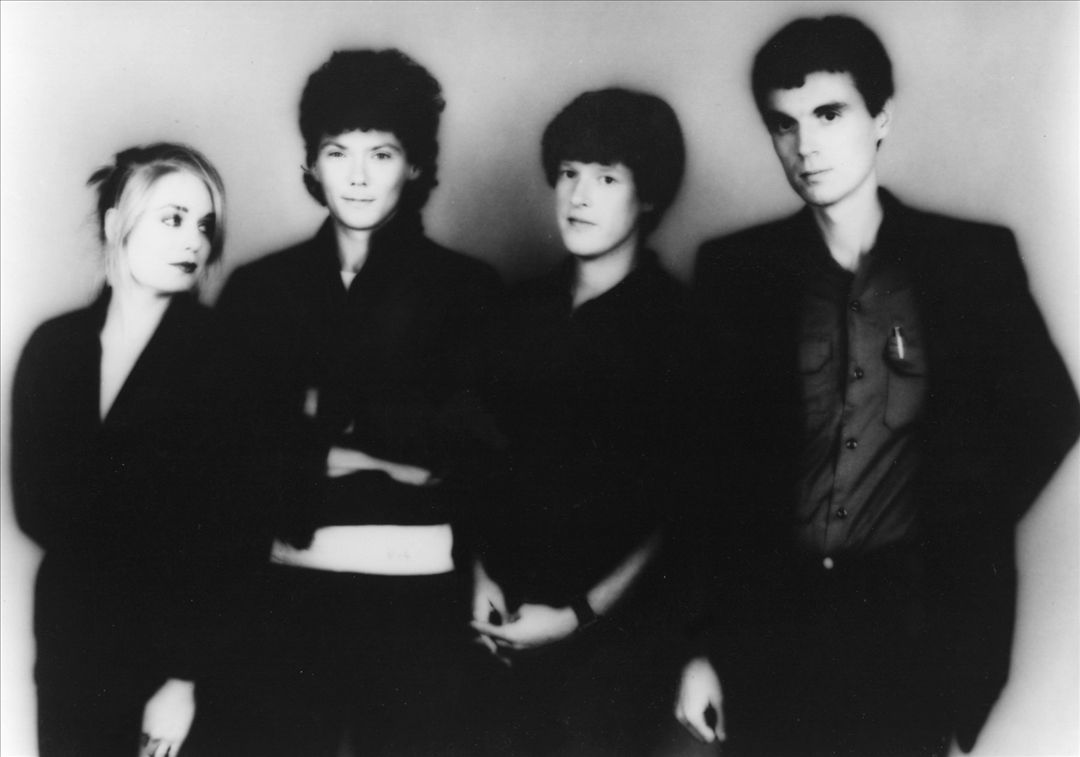
Talking Heads, 1980; publicity photo for Remain in Light; Goldsmith for Sire Records
