= Mike Mainieri =

American vibraphonist (born 1938)

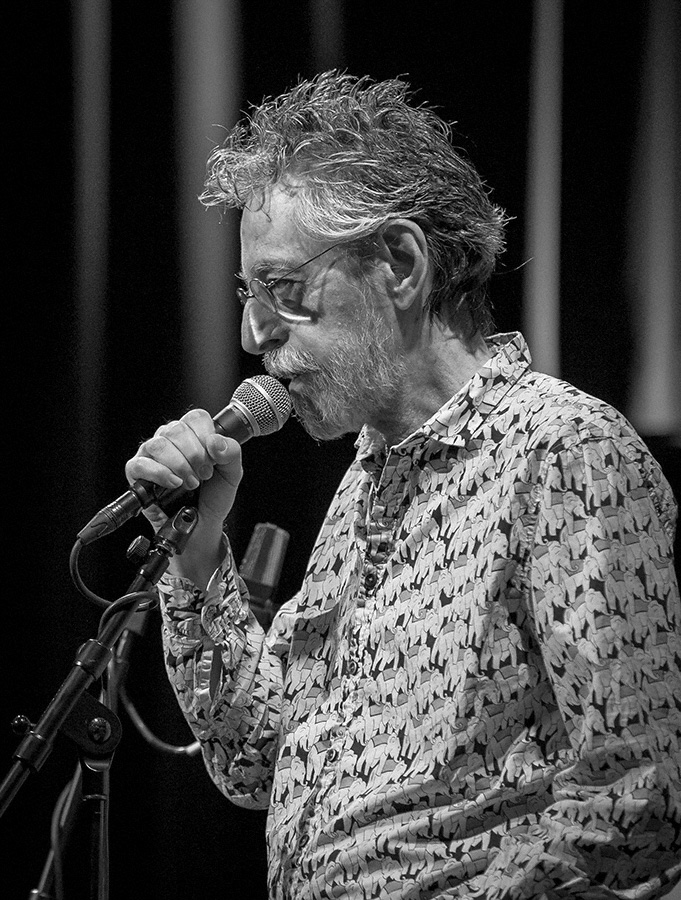
- Mainieri in 2016

Background information
- Born: July 4, 1938 (age 88); The Bronx, New York, United States
- Genres: Jazz, jazz fusion, rock
- Occupations: Musician, composer, label owner
- Instruments: vibraphone, keyboards
- Years active: 1952–present
- Labels: Elektra Musician, NYC
- Spouse: Dee Carstensen (m. 1993)
- Website: www.nycrecords.com

Michael T. Mainieri Jr. (born July 4, 1938) is an American vibraphonist, known for his work with the jazz fusion group Steps Ahead. He is married to the singer-songwriter and harpist Dee Carstensen.

== Biography ==
Mainieri was born in The Bronx, New York, United States. Mainieri was a pioneer in introducing an electronic vibraphone, known as a synth-vibe, and has recorded with such musicians as Buddy Rich, Wes Montgomery and Jeremy Steig. He performed for a live album by Laura Nyro and was featured on several tracks from the Dire Straits album, Love Over Gold (1982), as well as on "Ride Across the River" on the album Brothers in Arms (1985). He performed on the albums Heads by Bob James, Heart to Heart by David Sanborn, and Tiger in the Rain by Michael Franks.

He has also released numerous albums and videos as a leader for a variety of labels, most notably his 1980 album for Warner Bros. titled Wanderlust, which featured Michael Brecker and other members of Steps Ahead. He produced three albums for Carly Simon. Mainieri married singer-songwriter/harpist Dee Carstensen in 1993.

== Discography ==
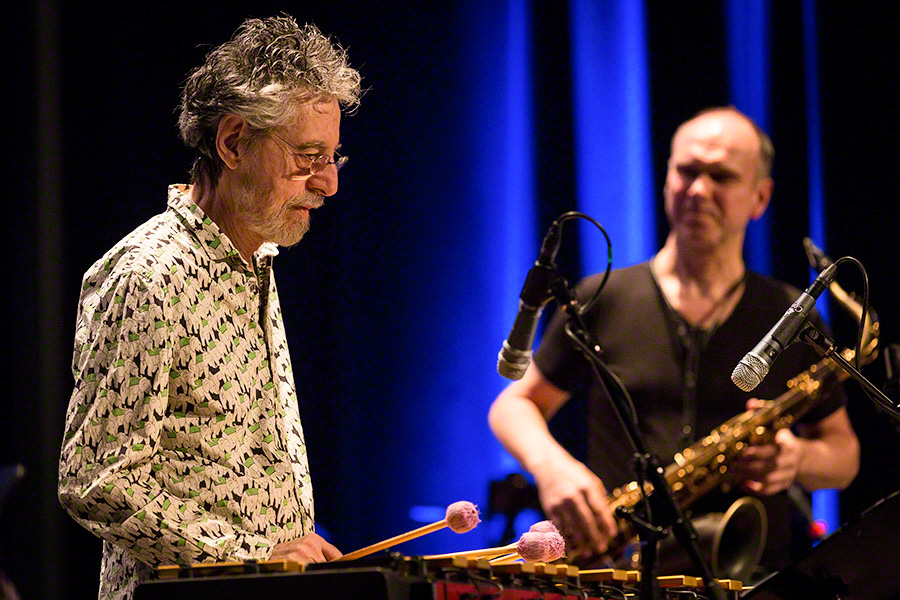
Mike Mainieri with Bendik Hofseth, Cosmopolite Scene, Oslo, 2016.

=== As leader ===
- Blues on the Other Side (Argo, 1963) (as The Mike Mainieri Quartet)
- Journey Thru an Electric Tube (Solid State, 1968)
- Insight (Solid State, 1968) (as The Mike Mainieri Quartet)
- Love Play (Arista, 1977)
- Free Smiles: Live at Montreaux 1978 (Arista Novus, 1978) (with Warren Bernhardt)
- Wanderlust (Warner Bros., 1981)
- Man Behind Bars (NYC, 1995)
- An American Diary (NYC, 1995)
- Live at the Seventh Avenue South (NYC,1996) (as The Mike Mainieri Quartet)
- An American Diary: The Dreamings (NYC, 1997)
- Northern Lights (NYC, 2006)
- L'Image 2.0 (L'Image, 2009)
- Crescent (NYC, 2010)

=== As a member ===
==== With Arista All Stars ====
- Blue Montreux (Arista, 1979) – live

==== With Steps Ahead ====
Studio albums

- Step by Step (1980)
- Steps Ahead (1983)
- Modern Times (1984)
- Magnetic (1986)
- N.Y.C. (1989)
- Yin-Yang (1992)
- Vibe (1994)
- Steppin Out (2016)

Live albums

- Smokin' in the Pit (1980)
- Paradox (1982)
- Live in Tokyo 1986 (1986)
- Holding Together: Live in Europe 1999 (2002)

=== As sideman ===
With Dire Straits

- Love over Gold (Vertigo, 1982)
- Brothers in Arms (Vertigo, 1985)

With Eliane Elias

- Dreamer (Bluebird, 2004)
- Dance of Time (Concord, 2017)
- Time and Again (Candid, 2024)

With Art Farmer

- Big Blues with Jim Hall (CTI, 1979)
- Yama with Joe Henderson (CTI, 1979)

With Michael Franks

- Tiger in the Rain (Warner Bros., 1979)
- Time Together (Shanachie, 2011)

With Tim Hardin

- Tim Hardin 4 (Verve, 1969)
- Bird on a Wire (Columbia, 1971)

With Don McLean

- American Pie (United Artists, 1971)
- Playin' Favorites (United Artists, 1973)

With Buddy Rich

- Buddy Rich Just Sings (Verve, 1957)
- Richcraft (Mercury, 1959)
- The Driver (EmArcy, 1960)
- Playtime (Argo, 1961)
- Blues Caravan (Verve, 1962)

With Rosie

- Last Dance (RCA Victor, 1977)

With Carly Simon

- Spy (Elektra, 1979)
- Come Upstairs (Warner Bros., 1980)
- Torch (Warner Bros., 1981)
- Hello Big Man (Warner Bros., 1983)
- Comes in Waves (Iris., 2026)

With Paul Simon

- Paul Simon (Columbia, 1972)
- Hearts and Bones (Warner Bros., 1983)

With Sonny Stitt

- What's New!!! (Roulette, 1966)
- I Keep Comin' Back! (Roulette, 1966)

With Kazumi Watanabe

- To Chi Ka (Columbia, 1980)
- Dogatana (Denon, 1981)
- One for All (Polydor, 1999) – live
- Lotus Night (Warner Music, 2016) – live

With others

- Aerosmith, Toys in the Attic (Columbia, 1975) - conductor
- Manny Albam, The Soul of the City (Solid State, 1966)
- George Benson, Livin' Inside Your Love (Warner Bros., 1979)
- Stephen Bishop, Red Cab to Manhattan (Warner Bros., 1980)
- Kenny Burrell, A Generation Ago Today (Verve, 1967)
- Marnix Busstra Trio, Twelve Pieces (Buzz Music, 2006)
- Dee Carstensen, Beloved One (NYC Records, 1993)
- Marc Cohn, The Rainy Season (Atlantic, 1993)
- Paul Desmond, Summertime (CTI, 1968)
- Will Downing, Will Downing (Island, 1988)
- Faith Hope and Charity, Faith Hope & Charity (20th Century Fox, 1978)
- Lotti Golden, Lotti Golden (GRT, 1971)
- Urbie Green, The Fox (CTI, 1976)
- John Hall, Power (Columbia, 1979)
- Bendik Hofseth, IX (Sony, 1991)
- Jake Holmes, How Much Time (Columbia, 1972)
- Janis Ian, Night Rains (Columbia, 1979) – recorded in 1978
- Bob James, Heads (Tappan Zee, 1977)
- Garland Jeffreys, Garland Jeffreys (Atlantic, 1973)
- Billy Joel, 52nd Street (Columbia, 1978)
- Etta Jones, Etta Jones Sings (Roulette, 1966)
- Mark Knopfler, Local Hero (Vertigo, 1983)
- Rickie Lee Jones, Pieces of Treasure (BMG, 2023)
- Nils Lofgren, I Came to Dance (A&M Records, 1977)
- Pat Martino, Starbright (Warner Bros., 1976)
- Paul McCartney, Kisses on the Bottom (Hear Music, 2012)
- Van McCoy, My Favorite Fantasy (MCA, 1978)
- Brother Jack McDuff, Who Knows What Tomorrow's Gonna Bring? (Blue Note, 1970)
- Marcus Miller, Suddenly (Warner Bros., 1983)
- Monday Orchestra, Never Alone: The Music of Michael Brecker (Barnum For Art, 2018)
- Wes Montgomery, Down Here on the Ground (CTI, 1968)
- Laura Nyro, Season of Lights (Columbia, 1977) – live recorded in 1976
- Linda Ronstadt, Living in the USA (Asylum, 1978)
- Ali Ryerson, Con Brio! (ACR Music, 2011)
- David Sanborn, Time Again (Verve, 2003)
- Boz Scaggs, Speak Low (Decca, 2008)
- Chris Smither, Honeysuckle Dog (Okra-Tone, 2005) – recorded in 1973
- Bert Sommer, Bert Sommer (Buddah, 1970)
- Swiss Jazz Orchestra, Pools: Live at Jazzfestival Bern (Mons, 2016) – live recorded in 2015
- Livingston Taylor, Over the Rainbow (Capricorn, 1972)
- Tony Orlando and Dawn, Dawn's New Ragtime Follies (Bell, 1973) – recorded in 1972-1973
- Tony Orlando and Dawn, To Be With You (Elektra, 1976)
- Stefano Zeni, Parallel Paths (Zanetti, 2018)
- Zulema, Z-licious (Lejoint, 1978)
