= Carly Simon discography =

Discography of American singer-songwriter Carly Simon

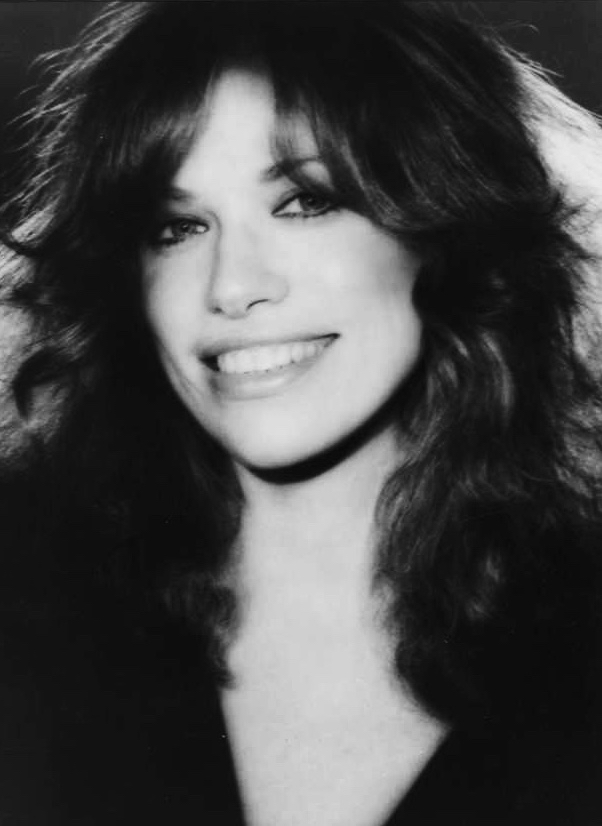
- Elektra Records promo photo of Simon, 1978
- Studio albums: 24
- Soundtrack albums: 4
- Live albums: 2
- Compilation albums: 10
- Singles: 50
- Video albums: 4
- Music videos: 36
- No. 1 singles: 2
- Christmas albums: 1
- Audiobooks: 2

The discography of Carly Simon, an American singer and songwriter, consists of 24 studio albums (which includes one Christmas album), two live albums, 10 compilation albums, four soundtrack albums, two audiobooks, and 50 singles, on Elektra Records, Warner Bros. Records, Epic Records, Arista Records, Rhino Entertainment, Columbia Records, Hear Music, and Iris Records, with special releases on Qwest Records, Angel Records, Walt Disney Records, and Macmillan Audio. These lists include all live and studio albums, and the motion picture soundtracks list includes albums containing more than 50% of music by Simon.

In the United States, Simon has five Platinum albums and three Gold albums. In the United Kingdom, she has three Gold albums and two Silver albums. All but one of her studio albums have charted on the U.S. Billboard 200, with 12 charting in the Top 40, and five in the Top 10. Two of her compilation albums have also charted in the Top 40. Simon also has amassed 24 Billboard Hot 100 singles, with 13 of them hitting the Top 40, and 28 Billboard Adult Contemporary chart singles, all charting in the Top 40. Four of her singles have been certified Gold by the Recording Industry Association of America (RIAA): "You're So Vain", "Mockingbird" (with James Taylor), "Nobody Does It Better", and "Jesse". "You're So Vain" was certified Platinum by the British Phonographic Industry (BPI), while "Nobody Does It Better" and "Coming Around Again" were certified Silver.

== Recording history ==
=== 1971–1979: Elektra years ===
Simon was signed by Jac Holzman to Elektra Records in 1970. She released her self-titled debut album in February 1971, and it won her the Grammy Award for Best New Artist. The album spawned her first Top 10 single, "That's the Way I've Always Heard It Should Be" (No. 10), which also earned her a Grammy Award nomination for Best Pop Vocal Performance, Female. Her second album, Anticipation, followed in November 1971 and yielded the successful singles "Anticipation" and "Legend in Your Own Time". Anticipation earned Simon another Grammy nomination in 1973 and was later certified Gold by the RIAA. In 1972, Simon achieved international fame following the release of her third album, No Secrets; it reached No. 1 on the Billboard 200 for five weeks, was certified Platinum, and spawned the No. 1 worldwide hit "You're So Vain", which went Gold, and the Top 20 hit "The Right Thing to Do". No Secrets earned four Grammy nominations in 1974, including three for "You're So Vain".

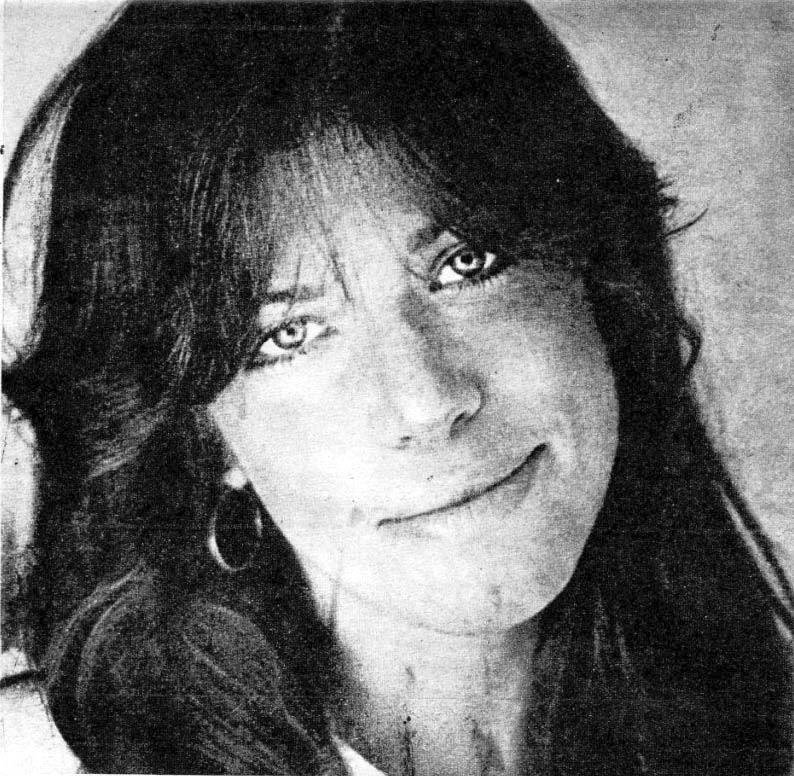
Simon in late 1973

Simon's fourth album, Hotcakes, was released that same year and became an instant hit; it went Gold and spawned the Top 10 singles "Mockingbird" (with James Taylor) and "Haven't Got Time for the Pain". Simon's fifth album, Playing Possum, appeared in 1975 and hit the Top 10. Its lead single, "Attitude Dancing", hit the Top 40, and the second single, "Waterfall", quickly followed. Later that year, Simon released her first greatest hits collection, The Best of Carly Simon, which achieved Triple Platinum status in the United States and remains her best-selling album to date. In 1976, Simon released her sixth album, Another Passenger, to critical acclaim. The album spawned two singles: "It Keeps You Runnin'" and "Half a Chance".

"Nobody Does It Better", from the James Bond film The Spy Who Loved Me, became a worldwide hit in 1977. The single hit No. 1 on the Billboard Easy Listening chart, where it stayed for seven weeks, eventually becoming the No. 1 Adult Contemporary hit of the year. It went Gold and earned two Grammy nominations. Simon's seventh album, Boys in the Trees, was released the following year and spawned the hit singles "You Belong to Me" (which earned Simon another Grammy nomination) and "Devoted to You" (with James Taylor). The album was certified Platinum and won the Grammy Award for Best Album Package. Simon's eighth album and her last for Elektra Records, Spy, was released in 1979. Its lead single, "Vengeance", earned Simon a Grammy nomination for Best Rock Vocal Performance, Female in 1980, the first year to feature this category.

=== 1980–1985: Warner Bros. and Epic years ===
Simon signed with Warner Bros. Records in 1980 and released her ninth studio album, Come Upstairs. The lead single, "Jesse", became a major hit; it remained on the Billboard Hot 100 singles chart for six months, peaking at No. 11, and went Gold. Also in 1980, Simon appeared in the documentary and concert film No Nukes, and it accompanying soundtrack album of the same name. The standards album Torch followed in 1981, and Hello Big Man followed in 1983, both to critical acclaim. In 1982, she hit the Top 10 in the U.K. with the Nile Rodgers & Bernard Edwards-produced single "Why", from the soundtrack album to the film Soup for One. She had another UK success (No. 17) with the single "Kissing with Confidence", a song from the 1983 album Dancing For Mental Health by Will Powers (a pseudonym for photographer Lynn Goldsmith). Simon was the uncredited lead singer.

After her contract with Warner Bros. had ended, she signed with Epic Records and released Spoiled Girl in 1985. The album yielded two singles, "Tired of Being Blonde" and "My New Boyfriend", with only the former charting. The album was commercially unsuccessful and her contract with Epic was not extended.

=== 1986–2000: Arista years ===
In 1986, Simon signed with Arista Records and released Coming Around Again the following year. The album became a great success, and spawned four Top 10 Adult Contemporary singles: "Coming Around Again" (written for the film Heartburn), "Give Me All Night", "The Stuff That Dreams Are Made Of", and "All I Want Is You". It was certified Platinum and earned Simon two Grammy nominations. In June 1987, Simon performed a special outdoor concert on a purpose built pier on the Massachusetts island of Martha's Vineyard (where she lives). Live from Martha's Vineyard (also titled as Carly Simon: Coming Around Again) was broadcast as an HBO special in 1987, and featured Simon performing most of the just released Coming Around Again album, as well as some of her classic hits. The concert was released the following year as Greatest Hits Live and went Platinum. "Let the River Run" was written for the film Working Girl in 1988, and won Simon the Academy Award for Best Original Song and the Golden Globe Award for Best Original Song in 1989, and the Grammy Award for Best Song Written for a Motion Picture, Television or Other Visual Media in 1990. This made Simon the first artist in history to win this trio of awards for a song composed and written, as well as performed, entirely by a single artist. The Working Girl soundtrack album was released in August 1989 and featured more music from Simon.

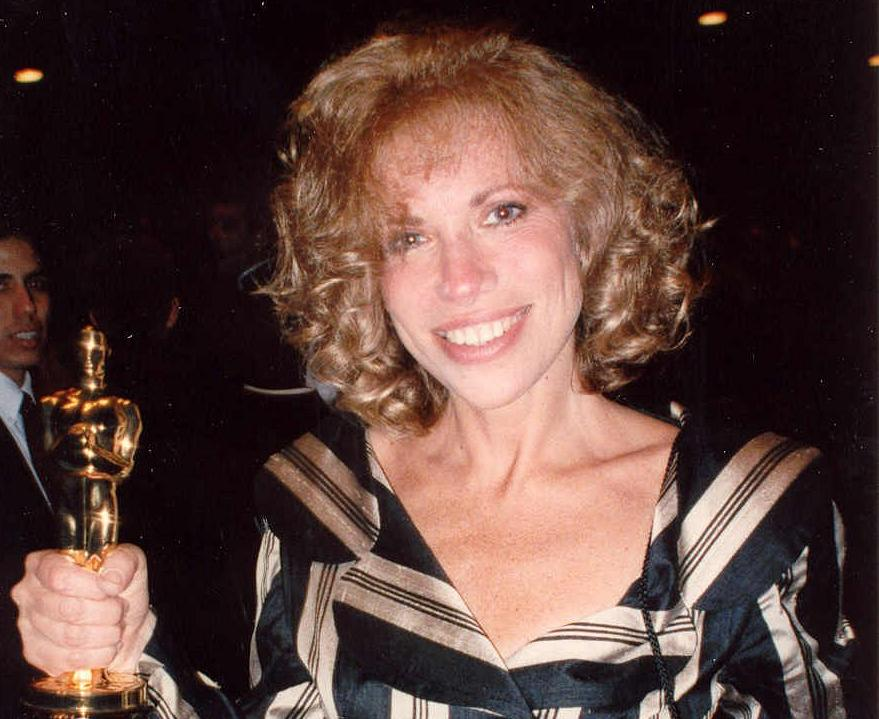
Simon in 1989

In 1990, Simon released her second standards album My Romance, which was followed by the HBO special Carly in Concert – My Romance. Later that year, she released Have You Seen Me Lately, which yielded the major Top 10 Adult Contemporary hit "Better Not Tell Her", her biggest hit of the 1990s. She scored another Adult Contemporary hit in 1992 with "Love of My Life" (No. 16), written for the film This Is My Life, and featured on the soundtrack album, which includes more music from Simon. She was jointly commissioned by the Metropolitan Opera Association and the Kennedy Center in 1993 to write a contemporary opera that would appeal to younger people; Romulus Hunt: A Family Opera was the result, and was released on Angel Records that year. In December 2014, the Nashville Opera Association premiered a new performance edition of the opera.

Simon's 16th studio album, Letters Never Sent, was released in 1994. The album featured "Like a River" in honor of her mother, Andrea Simon, and "Touched By The Sun" for her dear friend, Jackie Onassis, both of whom died from cancer in 1994. Live at Grand Central was an unannounced concert recorded for Lifetime in 1995 and was broadcast later that year. It featured Simon performing a majority of the just released Letters Never Sent album, as well as some of her classic hits. The three-disc career retrospective Clouds in My Coffee was released that same year. Simon's third standards album, Film Noir, was released in 1997. It featured duets with Jimmy Webb and John Travolta, and earned two Grammy nominations in 1998. That same year, the single-disc UK import The Very Best of Carly Simon: Nobody Does It Better was released. Simon's 20th studio album and her last for Arista Records, The Bedroom Tapes, was released on May 16, 2000, to near unanimous critical acclaim.

=== 2001–present: Post-Arista releases ===
In 2001, Simon performed on "Son of a Gun" with Janet Jackson on Jackson's album All for You. The song was released as a single and peaked at No. 28 on the Billboard Hot 100. In 2002, Simon released her first Christmas album Christmas Is Almost Here, and the two-disc career retrospective Anthology. The single-disc Reflections: Carly Simon's Greatest Hits was released in 2004 to great commercial success; it peaked at No. 22 on the Billboard 200, remained on the chart for 19 weeks, and went Gold. In 2005, Simon signed with Columbia Records and released her fourth album of standards, Moonlight Serenade, which reached No. 7 on the Billboard 200, and earned Simon her 14th Grammy nomination the following year. In the fall of 2005, Simon performed two concerts on board the RMS Queen Mary 2. A Moonlight Serenade on the Queen Mary 2 was broadcast on various PBS stations that December and released on DVD. Simon performed with Andreas Vollenweider on four tracks for his 2006 holiday album, Midnight Clear.

Simon's fifth collection of covers, Into White, was released to critical acclaim in January 2007 and became Billboard's Hot Shot Debut, entering the chart at No. 15 and peaking at No. 13 in its second week. In April 2008, Simon released This Kind of Love, which debuted at No. 15 on the Billboard 200. It was her first album of original material since The Bedroom Tapes eight years earlier and was released on the Starbucks label, Hear Music. In October 2009, Simon released Never Been Gone, an album of acoustic reworkings of some of her classic songs, which is her most recent studio album to date. In 2015, Songs From The Trees (A Musical Memoir Collection) was simultaneously released as a tie-in to Simon's autobiography, Boys in the Trees: A Memoir. The two-disc set contained two previously unreleased songs, "Showdown" (originally recorded during the sessions for her 1978 album Boys in the Trees) and "I Can't Thank You Enough", a brand new song written and performed with her son Ben Taylor.

On January 27, 2023, Live at Grand Central was re-released on Blu-ray, CD, and Vinyl. On September 15, 2023, the compilation album These Are the Good Old Days: The Carly Simon and Jac Holzman Story was released on CD and Vinyl. The collection features a mix of hits and deep cuts selected from Simon's first three albums, chosen and sequenced by Holzman. On June 11, 2026, Simon released a new single, "Howl", along with the announcement of her 24th studio album Comes in Waves. Comes in Waves was released on August 14, and is her first studio album featuring new music since This Kind of Love in 2008.

== Albums ==
=== Studio albums ===
Year	Album	Peak chart positions							Certifications
Year	Album	US	AUS	CAN	GER	JPN	NZ	UK	Certifications
1971	Carly Simon: Released: February 9, 1971; Label: Elektra; Formats: CD, LP, cassette	30	55	17	—	—	—	—	
1971	Anticipation: Released: November 1971; Label: Elektra; Formats: CD, LP, cassette	30	12	36	—	—	—	—	RIAA: Gold
1972	No Secrets: Released: November 16, 1972; Label: Elektra; Formats: CD, LP, cassette	1	1	1	39	3	—	3	RIAA: Platinum; BPI: Gold
1974	Hotcakes: Released: January 11, 1974; Label: Elektra; Formats: CD, LP, cassette	3	9	7	—	39	—	19	RIAA: Gold
1975	Playing Possum: Released: April 8, 1975; Label: Elektra; Formats: CD, LP, cassette	10	25	22	—	70	32	—	
1976	Another Passenger: Released: June 8, 1976; Label: Elektra; Formats: CD, LP, cassette	29	44	44	—	—	—	—	
1978	Boys in the Trees: Released: April 4, 1978; Label: Elektra; Formats: CD, LP, cassette	10	27	4	—	—	—	—	RIAA: Platinum
1979	Spy: Released: June 12, 1979; Label: Elektra; Formats: CD, LP, cassette	45	33	56	—	—	—	—	
1980	Come Upstairs: Released: June 16, 1980; Label: Warner Bros.; Formats: CD, LP, cassette	36	43	86	—	—	—	—	
1981	Torch: Released: September 29, 1981; Label: Warner Bros.; Formats: CD, LP, cassette	50	77	50	—	56	40	—	
1983	Hello Big Man: Released: September 20, 1983; Label: Warner Bros.; Formats: CD, LP, cassette	69	—	—	—	—	—	—	
1985	Spoiled Girl: Released: July 2, 1985; Label: Epic; Formats: CD, LP, cassette	88	97	96	—	—	—	—	
1987	Coming Around Again: Released: April 13, 1987; Label: Arista; Formats: CD, LP, cassette	25	24	57	32	—	—	25	RIAA: Platinum; MC: Platinum; BPI: Silver
1990	My Romance: Released: March 6, 1990; Label: Arista; Formats: CD, LP, cassette	46	—	—	—	—	—	—	
1990	Have You Seen Me Lately: Released: September 25, 1990; Label: Arista; Formats: CD, LP, cassette	60	160	64	—	—	—	—	
1994	Letters Never Sent: Released: November 1, 1994; Label: Arista; Formats: CD, cassette	129	—	—	—	—	—	—	
1997	Film Noir: Released: September 16, 1997; Label: Arista; Formats: CD, cassette	84	—	—	—	—	—	—	
2000	The Bedroom Tapes: Released: May 16, 2000; Label: Arista; Formats: CD, cassette	90	—	—	—	—	—	—	
2005	Moonlight Serenade: Released: July 19, 2005; Label: Columbia; Format: CD	7	—	—	—	—	—	—	
2007	Into White: Released: January 2, 2007; Label: Columbia; Format: CD	13	—	—	—	—	—	—	
2008	This Kind of Love: Released: April 29, 2008; Label: Hear Music; Format: CD	15	—	—	—	—	—	—	
2009	Never Been Gone: Released: October 27, 2009; Labels: Iris, Rhino (UK/EU); Formats: CD, LP	134	—	—	—	—	—	45	
2026	Comes in Waves: Released: August 14, 2026; Labels: Iris Records; Formats: CD, Digital	—	—	—	—	—	—	—	
"—" denotes a recording that did not chart or was not released in that territory.

=== Compilation albums ===
Year	Album	Peak chart positions						Certifications
Year	Album	US	AUS	CAN	HUN	IRE	UK	Certifications
1975	The Best of Carly Simon: Released: November 1975; Label: Elektra; Formats: CD, LP, cassette	17	42	40	—	—	—	RIAA: 3× Platinum; ARIA: 3× Platinum; MC: Gold
1995	Clouds in My Coffee: Released: November 7, 1995; Label: Arista; Formats: CD, cassette	—	—	—	—	—	—	
1999	The Very Best of Carly Simon: Nobody Does It Better: Released: March 5, 1999; Labels: Global TV, WSM; Formats: CD, cassette	—	—	—	—	—	22	BPI: Silver
2002	Anthology: Released: November 5, 2002; Labels: Elektra, Rhino; Format: CD	—	—	—	—	—	—	
2004	Reflections: Carly Simon's Greatest Hits: Released: May 4, 2004; Labels: Rhino, BMG Heritage; Formats: CD, LP	22	—	—	—	—	25	RIAA: Gold; BPI: Gold
2009	Carly Simon Collector's Edition: Released: March 31, 2009; Label: Madacy; Format: CD	—	—	—	—	—	—	
2011	Original Album Series: Released: October 10, 2011; Label: Rhino; Format: CD	—	—	—	—	—	—	
2014	Playlist: The Very Best of Carly Simon: Released: October 27, 2014; Labels: Legacy, Sony BMG; Format: CD	—	—	—	—	—	—	
2015	Songs from the Trees: A Musical Memoir Collection: Released: November 20, 2015; Label: Rhino; Format: CD	—	—	—	—	68	—	
2023	These Are the Good Old Days: The Carly Simon and Jac Holzman Story: Released: September 15, 2023; Label: Rhino; Format: CD, LP	—	—	—	34	—	—	
"—" denotes a recording that did not chart or was not released in that territory.

=== Live albums ===
Year	Album	Peak chart positions		Certifications
Year	Album	US	UK	Certifications
1988	Greatest Hits Live: Released: August 2, 1988; Label: Arista; Formats: CD, LP, cassette	87	49	RIAA: Platinum; MC: Gold; BPI: Gold
2023	Live at Grand Central: Released: January 27, 2023; Label: C'est Music; Formats: CD, LP	—^{[A]}	—	
"—" denotes a recording that did not chart or was not released in that territory.

Notes

- ^{A} Reached No. 100 on the Billboard Top Current Album Sales chart.

=== Christmas albums ===
Year	Album	Peak chart positions
Year	Album	US Holiday
2002	Christmas Is Almost Here: Released: October 22, 2002; Label: Rhino; Format: CD	14

=== Soundtrack albums ===
Year	Album	Peak chart positions
Year	Album	US
1989	Working Girl (Original Soundtrack Album): Released: August 1989; Label: Arista; Formats: CD, LP, cassette	45
1992	This Is My Life (Music from the Motion Picture): Released: April 1992; Label: Quest; Formats: CD, cassette	—
2003	Piglet's Big Movie (soundtrack): Released: March 2003; Label: Walt Disney Records; Format: CD	—
2005	The Best of Pooh and Heffalumps, Too: Released: February 2005; Label: Walt Disney Records; Format: CD	—
"—" denotes a recording that did not chart or was not released in that territory.

=== Other albums ===
Year	Album	Peak chart positions	Certifications
Year	Album	US	Certifications
1979	No Nukes: The Muse Concerts for a Non-Nuclear Future: Released: November 1979; Label: Asylum; Formats: CD, LP, cassette	14	RIAA: Gold
1980	In Harmony: A Sesame Street Record: Released: October 1980; Label: Warner Bros.; Formats: CD, LP, cassette	156	
1982	In Harmony 2: Released: 1982; Label: Columbia; Formats: LP, cassette	—	
1993	Romulus Hunt: A Family Opera: Released: November 16, 1993; Label: Angel; Formats: CD, cassette	—	
"—" denotes a recording that did not chart or was not released in that territory.

=== Audiobooks ===
Year	Album
1994	Bells, Bears and Fishermen: Released: February 8, 1994; Label: Bantam Doubleday; Formats: CD, cassette
2015	Boys in the Trees: A Memoir: Released: November 25, 2015; Label: Macmillan Audio; Formats: CD

=== Deluxe editions ===
Year	Album	Bonus materials
2012	Spoiled Girl: Deluxe Edition: Released: July 2012; Label: Hot Shot Records; Formats: CD	Four bonus tracks: "Black Honeymoon", the 7" single version of "Tired of Being Blonde", and two 12" remixes of "My New Boyfriend".
2015	The Bedroom Tapes: Special Edition: Released: April 2015; Label: C'est Music; Formats: CD	Two bonus tracks: "Grandmother's House" and "When Manhattan Was a Maiden".
2017	Coming Around Again: 30th Anniversary Deluxe Edition: Released: October 2017; Label: Hot Shot Records; Formats: CD	Six bonus tracks, and a second disc consisting of Simon's Greatest Hits Live album, retitled for this set as Carly in Concert – Coming Around Again.

== Singles ==
Year	Single	Peak chart positions									Certification	Album
Year	Single	US	US CB Pop	US A/C	AUS	CAN	CAN AC	GER	IRE	UK	Certification	Album
1971	"That's the Way I've Always Heard It Should Be"	10	9	6	62	15	—	—	—	—		Carly Simon
1971	"Anticipation"	13	10	3	64	9	—	—	—	—		Anticipation
1972	"Legend in Your Own Time"	50	61	11	86	39	—	—	—	—		Anticipation
1972	"The Girl You Think You See"	—	—	—	—	—	—	—	—	—		Anticipation
1972	"I've Got to Have You"^{[B]}	—	—	—	6	—	—	—	—	—		Anticipation
1972	"You're So Vain"	1	1	1	1	1	1	8	4	3	RIAA: Gold; BPI: 2× Platinum; RMNZ: 3× Platinum	No Secrets
1973	"The Right Thing to Do"/"We Have No Secrets"	17	10	4	—	20	9	—	—	17		No Secrets
1974	"Mockingbird" (with James Taylor)	5	3	10	8	3	—	—	—	34	RIAA: Gold	Hotcakes
1974	"Haven't Got Time for the Pain"	14	7	2	74	5	1	—	—	—		Hotcakes
1975	"Attitude Dancing"	21	25	18	70	21	26	—	—	—		Playing Possum
1975	"Waterfall"	78	76	21	—	—	—	—	—	—		Playing Possum
1975	"More and More"	94	90	—	—	—	—	—	—	—		Playing Possum
1976	"It Keeps You Runnin'"	46	49	27	—	47	—	—	—	—		Another Passenger
1976	"Half a Chance"	—	—	39	—	—	—	—	—	—		Another Passenger
1977	"Nobody Does It Better"	2	2	1	8	2	1	31	1	7	RIAA: Gold; BPI: Silver	The Spy Who Loved Me (soundtrack)
1978	"You Belong to Me"	6	9	4	47	5	7	—	—	—		Boys in the Trees
1978	"Devoted to You" (with James Taylor)^{[C]}	36	48	2	—	50	—	—	—	—		Boys in the Trees
1978	"Tranquillo (Melt My Heart)"	—	86	—	—	—	—	—	—	—		Boys in the Trees
1979	"Vengeance"	48	52	—	90	97	—	—	—	—		Spy
1979	"Spy"	—	—	34	—	—	—	—	—	—		Spy
1980	"Jesse"	11	9	8	4	12	9	—	—	—	RIAA: Gold	Come Upstairs
1980	"Take Me as I Am"	—	—	—	—	—	—	—	—	—		Come Upstairs
1980	"Come Upstairs"	—	—	—	—	—	—	—	—	—		Come Upstairs
1981	"Hurt"	—	—	—	—	—	—	—	—	—		Torch
1981	"I Get Along Without You Very Well"	—	—	—	—	—	—	—	—	—		Torch
1982	"Why"	74	73	—	—	—	—	—	15	10		Soup for One (soundtrack)
1983	"You Know What to Do"	83	—	36	—	—	—	—	—	—		Hello Big Man
1983	"Hello Big Man"	—	—	—	—	—	—	—	—	—		Hello Big Man
1983	"Kissing with Confidence" (with Will Powers)^{[D]}	—	—	—	—	—	—	—	—	17		Dancing for Mental Health (by Will Powers)
1985	"Tired of Being Blonde"	70	63	34	95	—	—	—	—	—		Spoiled Girl
1985	"My New Boyfriend"	—	—	—	—	—	—	—	—	—		Spoiled Girl
1986	"Coming Around Again"	18	30	5	29	38	7	21	5	10	BPI: Silver	Coming Around Again
1987	"Give Me All Night"	61	70	5	—	87	—	—	—	98		Coming Around Again
1987	"The Stuff That Dreams Are Made Of"	—	—	8	—	—	1	—	28	99		Coming Around Again
1987	"All I Want Is You"	54	68	7	—	—	—	—	—	—		Coming Around Again
1988	"You're So Vain" (live version)	—	—	—	—	—	—	—	—	96		Greatest Hits Live
1989	"Let the River Run"	49	51	11	83	50		—	—	79		Working Girl (Original Soundtrack Album)
1989	"Why" (extended version)	—	—	—	—	—	—	—	—	56		Single only
1990	"Better Not Tell Her"	—	103	4	154	30	3	—	—	—		Have You Seen Me Lately
1991	"Holding Me Tonight"	—	—	36	—	—	—	—	—	—		Have You Seen Me Lately
1991	"You're So Vain" (re-release)	—	—	—	—	—	—	—	—	41		No Secrets
1992	"Love of My Life"	—	—	16	—	88	25	—	—	—		This Is My Life (Music from the Motion Picture)
2001	"Son of a Gun (I Betcha Think This Song Is About You)" (with Janet Jackson featuring Missy Elliott)^{[E]}	28	—	—	20	—	—	69	21	13		All for You (by Janet Jackson)
2003	"White Christmas"/"Forgive"	—	—	—	—	—	—	—	—	—		Christmas Is Almost Here
2005	"Let It Snow"	—	—	6	—	—	—	—	—	—		Single only (recorded during Moonlight Serenade sessions)
2006	"Best of Friends" (with Livingston Taylor)	—	—	39	—	—	—	—	—	—		There You Are Again (by Livingston Taylor)
2019	"Touched by the Sun" (live version - newly mixed)	—	—	—	—	—	—	—	—	—		Single only (from Live at Grand Central)
2023	"Angel from Montgomery" (2023 remaster)	—	—	—	—	—	—	—	—	—		These Are the Good Old Days: The Carly Simon and Jac Holzman Story
2025	"Share the End" (2025 remaster)	—	—	—	—	—	—	—	—	—		Anticipation
2026	"Howl"	—	—	—	—	—	—	—	—	—		Comes in Waves
2026	"Peaches"	—	—	—	—	—	—	—	—	—		Comes in Waves
"—" denotes a recording that did not chart or was not released in that territory.

Notes

- ^{B} "I've Got to Have You" was released as a single exclusively in Australia.
- ^{C} "Devoted to You" also peaked at No. 33 on the Billboard Hot Country Singles chart, and at No. 36 on the Cash Box Country chart.
- ^{D} Simon sang uncredited co-lead vocals on "Kissing with Confidence".
- ^{E} "Son of a Gun (I Betcha Think This Song Is About You)" also peaked at No. 26 on the Billboard Hot R&B/Hip-Hop Singles & Tracks chart and at No. 7 on the Billboard Hot Dance Club Play chart.

== Video albums ==
Title	Album details	Peak positions
Title	Album details	Music Video Sales
Live from Martha's Vineyard	Release date: September 7, 1988; Label: Arista; Formats: VHS, LaserDisc	7
Carly in Concert – My Romance	Release date: July 1, 1991; Label: Arista; Formats: VHS, LaserDisc	11
Live at Grand Central	Release date: December 12, 1995; Label: Polygram Video; Formats: VHS, LaserDisc	—
Live from Martha's Vineyard (re-release)	Release date: March 9, 2004; Label: Grandstand Entertainment; Format: DVD	—
A Moonlight Serenade on the Queen Mary 2	Release date: November 22, 2005; Label: Sony; Format: DVD	—
Live from Martha's Vineyard (re-release)	Release date: May 11, 2010; Label: Iris Records; Format: DVD	—
Live at Grand Central (re-release)	Release date: January 27, 2023; Label: C'est Music; Format: Blu-ray	—

== Music videos ==
Year	Title	Album	Director	Ref.
1979	"Vengeance"	Spy		
1979	"We're So Close"	Spy		
1979	"Never Been Gone"	Spy		
1981	"Hurt"	Torch		
1981	"I Get Along Without You Very Well"	Torch		
1981	"Body and Soul"	Torch		
1982	"Why"	Soup for One (soundtrack)		
1983	"You Know What to Do"	Hello Big Man	Dominic Orlando	
1983	"Hello Big Man"	Hello Big Man		
1983	"It Happens Everyday"	Hello Big Man		
1983	"Kissing with Confidence" (uncredited lead singer)	Dancing for Mental Health by Will Powers		
1984	"Ghostbusters" (uncredited cameo)	Ghostbusters (soundtrack)	Ivan Reitman	
1985	"My New Boyfriend"	Spoiled Girl	Jeff Stein	
1985	"Tired of Being Blonde"	Spoiled Girl	Jeremy Irons	
1987	"Coming Around Again"	Coming Around Again		
1987	"Give Me All Night"	Coming Around Again		
1989	"Let the River Run"	Working Girl (Original Soundtrack Album)		
1990	"Better Not Tell Her"	Have You Seen Me Lately		
1990	"Holding Me Tonight"	Have You Seen Me Lately		
1992	"Love of My Life"	This Is My Life (Music from the Motion Picture)		
1993	"In the Wee Small Hours of the Morning"	Sleepless in Seattle (soundtrack)	Kathy Daugherty	
1994	"Touched by the Sun"	Letters Never Sent		
1994	"Like a River"	Letters Never Sent		
1997	"Ev'ry Time We Say Goodbye"	Film Noir		
2002	"Winnie the Pooh (Theme Song)"	The Many Adventures of Winnie the Pooh		
2003	"With a Few Good Friends"	Piglet's Big Movie (soundtrack)	Francis Glebas	
2005	"I Only Have Eyes for You"	Moonlight Serenade	Tom DiCillo	
2007	"Into White"	Into White	Steve Lippman	
2007	"Blackbird"	Into White	Steve Lippman	
2007	"Quiet Evening"	Into White	Steve Lippman	
2007	"Scarborough Fair"	Into White	Steve Lippman	
2008	"This Kind of Love"	This Kind of Love		
2008	"How Can You Ever Forget"	This Kind of Love		
2008	"Island"	This Kind of Love		
2010	"You're So Vain"	Never Been Gone	Brett Bisogno	

== See also ==
- List of awards and nominations received by Carly Simon
