= Moonlight Serenade (Carly Simon album) =

Studio album by Carly Simon
- Released: July 19, 2005
- Recorded: 2004–2005
- Studios: Fox Force Five (Hollywood, California); Reagan's Garage and Westlake Studios (Los Angeles, California); The Cutting Room (New York City, New York)
- Genre: Pop standards
- Length: 41:42
- Label: Columbia
- Producer: Richard Perry

Carly Simon chronology
Reflections: Carly Simon's Greatest Hits (2004)	Moonlight Serenade (2005)	Into White (2007)

Moonlight Serenade is the 20th studio album by American singer-songwriter Carly Simon, released by Columbia Records, on July 19, 2005.

Simon's fourth album of standards, following Torch (1981), My Romance (1990), and Film Noir (1997), it debuted at No. 7 on the Billboard 200, selling 58,000 copies in its first week, and remained on the chart for 10 weeks. It was Simon's first US Top 10 album since Boys in the Trees (1978). The album was produced by Richard Perry, with whom Simon had worked with in the 1970s on songs such as "You're So Vain" and "Nobody Does It Better".

Moonlight Serenade was nominated for the Grammy Award for Best Traditional Pop Vocal Album in 2006.

== Reception ==
Professional ratings
Review scores
Source	Rating
AllMusic	3/5 stars
Entertainment Weekly	B−
Rolling Stone	3/5 stars

AllMusic wrote "Carly Simon's fourth collection of standards digs a little deeper than her previous outings... She delivers these songs with panache, savvy, and just a touch of sass," continuing "Her smoky voice lends itself well to "I've Got You Under My Skin" and "My One and Only Love", and her sense of theatrics is drop-dead gorgeous on "I Only Have Eyes for You", which is a bit of a radical reworking that actually works. The slippery delivery on these songs is what lends them their unique, sexy character. This isn't for everyone, but it's a winner nonetheless."

Writing for Rolling Stone, David Wild rated the album 3 out of 5 stars and stated "Let no one ever accuse Carly Simon of jumping on the current standards bandwagon. Though Frank Sinatra and Ella Fitzgerald beat her to the punch, Simon was still way ahead of the curve for the rock generation. Torch, the singer-songwriter's first album of songs from the American songbook, came out back in 1981. Simon demonstrates on her fourth album of standards that she remains an assured and expressive stylist, quite comfortable with the exquisite melodic and lyrical subtleties of material like "All the Things You Are", "How Long Has This Been Going On?" and "Moonglow". Moonlight Serenade also marks Simon's reunion with producer Richard Perry... It's nice to see these two back together and still holding themselves to a high standard."

== Awards ==
Year	Award	Category	Work	Result	Ref.
2006	Grammy Awards	Best Traditional Pop Vocal Album	Moonlight Serenade	Nominated	

== Track listing ==
Credits adapted from the album's liner notes.

No.	Title	Writer(s)	Length
1.	"Moonlight Serenade"	Glenn Miller; Mitchell Parish	4:02
2.	"I've Got You Under My Skin"	Cole Porter	3:48
3.	"I Only Have Eyes for You"	Al Dubin; Harry Warren	4:39
4.	"Moonglow"	Eddie DeLange; Will Hudson; Irving Mills	3:06
5.	"Alone Together"	Howard Dietz; Arthur Schwartz	3:32
6.	"In the Still of the Night"	Porter	4:26
7.	"The More I See You"	Mack Gordon; Harry Warren	3:31
8.	"Where or When"	Lorenz Hart; Richard Rodgers	3:31
9.	"My One and Only Love"	Robert Mellin; Guy Wood	3:26
10.	"All the Things You Are"	Jerome Kern; Oscar Hammerstein II	3:49
11.	"How Long Has This Been Going On?"	George Gershwin; Ira Gershwin	3:52
Total length:			41:42

Barnes & Noble exclusive bonus track
No.	Title	Writer(s)	Length
12.	"My Foolish Heart"	Ned Washington; Victor Young	3:28
Total length:			45:10

International version
No.	Title	Writer(s)	Length
12.	"My Foolish Heart"		3:28
13.	"Let It Snow"	Sammy Cahn; Jule Styne	3:07
Total length:			48:17

== Formats and alternate versions ==
The album was released in both regular and DualDisc formats, the latter which included an interview with Simon and Perry, as well as behind the scenes footage of the recording sessions and the entire album in surround sound.

- A special copy of the album was released by Barnes & Noble with a bonus track, "My Foolish Heart".
- The album was released in the United Kingdom on October 10, 2005. It included "My Foolish Heart" and another track, "Let It Snow".

== Transatlantic concert ==
A Moonlight Serenade on the Queen Mary 2 (DVD)

In September 2005, Simon performed two concerts aboard the RMS Queen Mary 2, on a transatlantic trip from New York City to Southampton. A DVD of the concerts was released as A Moonlight Serenade on the Queen Mary 2 on November 22, 2005, and an edited version was broadcast on various PBS stations during their December 2005 pledge drives. Simon performed many songs from the album, along with some of her biggest hits.

=== DVD Track listing ===
Ballroom set

- "Moonlight Serenade"
- "I've Got You Under My Skin"
- "Where Or When"
- "How Long Has This Been Going On?"
- "Let the River Run" (Carly Simon)
- "I Only Have Eyes for You"
- "Jesse" (Simon/Mike Mainieri)
- "Coming Around Again" (Simon)
- "Moonglow"
- "All the Things You Are"
- "The More I See You"
- "Alone Together"
- "You Belong to Me" (Simon/Michael McDonald)
- "Nobody Does It Better" (Marvin Hamlisch/Carole Bayer Sager)
- "You're So Vain" (Simon)

Acoustic Set

- "We Have No Secrets" (Simon)
- "Love of My Life/Devoted to You" (Simon/Felice and Boudleaux Bryant)
- "It Was So Easy" (Simon)
- "Boys In The Trees" (Simon)
- "Anticipation" (Simon)

Special Features

- "Let It Snow" (Bonus performance)
- "You're So Vain" (Karaoke version)
- Photo Gallery

== Concert tour ==
In October 2005, Simon announced her "Serenade Tour" which was to include older hits and songs from Moonlight Serenade. Her children, Sally Taylor and Ben Taylor, joined her on the tour.

== Credits ==
=== Musicians ===
- Carly Simon – vocals
- Michael Thompson – acoustic piano (1, 3, 4, 7–10), synth strings (1, 4, 5, 7–10), additional synthesizers (2, 6), synth vibraphone (4), Fender Rhodes (5)
- Andy Chukerman – synth strings (2, 11), additional synthesizers (6)
- Jim Cox – acoustic piano (2, 6, 11)
- Alex Navarro – synth strings (3, 6, 9), additional synthesizers (7)
- Vin D'Onofrio – guitars, guitar solo (8)
- Chris Golden – bass
- John Ferraro – drums (1–4, 6–11)
- Sammy Merendino – drum programming (5), percussion (5)
- Doug Webb – saxophone (1, 11), clarinet (1, 11), sax solo (2), clarinet solo (4), "stritch" sax solo (5), flute (6)
- Tom Evans – sax solo (3)
- Lee Thornburg – trombone (1), trumpet (1), flugelhorn solo (10)
- Larry Lunetta – trumpet solo (7)
- William Galison – harmonica solo (9)

Music arrangements

- Richard Perry – arrangements
- Lauren Wild – arrangements
- Michael Thompson – arrangements (1, 3–5, 7–10)
- Andy Chukerman – arrangements (2)
- Doug Webb – arrangements (11)

Live String Section

- Michael Thompson – string arrangements (1, 4, 7, 8, 10)
- Alex Navarro – string arrangements (3, 6, 9)
- Victor Lawrence – cello
- Danny Seidenberg – viola
- Sam Fischer, Samuel Formicola, Alyssa Park, Mark Robertson and Shalini Vijayan – violin

=== Production ===
- Richard Perry – producer
- Lauren Wild – associate producer
- Bobby Ginsburg – track recording, string recording, mixing
- Carter William Humphrey – track recording
- Dylan Margerum – vocal recording
- Marcos González – additional engineer, Pro Tools technician
- Jimmy Paar – additional engineer, Pro Tools technician
- Jeff Phurrough – additional engineer, Pro Tools technician
- Nick Sample – additional engineer, Pro Tools technician
- Phil Carbo – assistant engineer
- Anthony Gallo – assistant engineer
- Cesar Ramirez – assistant engineer
- Robert Hadley – mastering at The Mastering Lab (Hollywood, California)
- Ben McCarthy – production coordinator
- Shauna Krikorian – production assistant
- Lauren Dooreck Camara – art direction, design
- Bob Gothard – photography
- Kerri Brusca – management
- Denise Searle – personal assistant

== Charts ==
Chart (2005)	Peak position
US Billboard 200	7
