= These Are the Good Old Days: The Carly Simon and Jac Holzman Story =

Compilation album by Carly Simon
- Released: September 15, 2023
- Recorded: 1970–1972
- Genre: Pop rock
- Length: 76:40
- Labels: Rhino, Elektra

Carly Simon chronology
Live at Grand Central (2023)	These Are the Good Old Days: The Carly Simon and Jac Holzman Story (2023)	Comes in Waves (2026)

These Are the Good Old Days: The Carly Simon and Jac Holzman Story is a compilation album by American singer-songwriter Carly Simon, released on September 15, 2023.

The collection features a mix of hits and deep cuts selected from Simon's first three albums: Carly Simon, Anticipation (both 1971), and No Secrets (1972) as well as an outtake of Simon covering John Prine's "Angel from Montgomery" and a previously unreleased demo for "Alone". All tracks were chosen and sequenced by Jac Holzman. In the accompanying booklet, music historian Ted Olson details Simon and Holzman's short but successful partnership. It's illustrated with photos from that period, and the commentary by Olson includes insights from new interviews conducted with Simon and Holzman exclusively for this release.

"Angel from Montgomery" was released as a single on July 12, 2023.

== Reception ==
Salon called the album "the feel-good compilation of 2023" and further described it as "exceedingly well-curated." Glide magazine stated: "Whether you’re a longtime fan or just discovering Carly Simon's music, These Are the Good Old Days: The Carly Simon and Jan Holzman Story is a must-listen for anyone who appreciates the art of storytelling through song."

== Track listing ==
All songs have been remastered for this collection. Credits adapted from the album's liner notes.

No.	Title	Writer(s)	Original album	Length
1.	"Anticipation"	Carly Simon	Anticipation (1971)	3:22
2.	"It Was So Easy"	Simon; Jacob Brackman	No Secrets (1972)	3:09
3.	"Alone (Audition Tape 1970)"	Simon	Previously unreleased	3:08
4.	"The Best Thing"	Simon	Carly Simon (1971)	4:24
5.	"Dan, My Fling"	Brackman; Freddy Gardner	Carly Simon (1971)	5:26
6.	"I've Got to Have You"	Kris Kristofferson	Anticipation (1971)	4:48
7.	"The Love's Still Growing"	Buzzy Linhart	Carly Simon (1971)	4:09
8.	"Summer's Coming Around Again"	Simon; Jim Ryan; Paul Glanz	Anticipation (1971)	4:09
9.	"Our First Day Together"	Simon	Anticipation (1971)	3:29
10.	"Embrace Me, You Child"	Simon	No Secrets (1972)	4:09
11.	"Legend in Your Own Time"	Simon	Anticipation (1971)	3:44
12.	"That's the Way I've Always Heard It Should Be"	Simon; Brackman	Carly Simon (1971)	4:17
13.	"The Carter Family"	Simon; Brackman	No Secrets (1972)	3:31
14.	"Angel from Montgomery (Outtake)"	John Prine	Previously unreleased	4:08
15.	"Julie Through the Glass"	Simon	Anticipation (1971)	3:24
16.	"His Friends Are More Than Fond of Robin"	Simon	No Secrets (1972)	3:02
17.	"Reunions"	Simon; Bill Mernit; Eddie Kramer	Carly Simon (1971)	3:06
18.	"The Right Thing to Do"	Simon	No Secrets (1972)	3:00
19.	"We Have No Secrets"	Simon	No Secrets (1972)	3:58
20.	"You're So Vain"	Simon	No Secrets (1972)	4:17
Total length:				76:40

== Personnel ==
- Yas Abassi – product manager
- Allison Boron – project assistant
- Bruce Botnick – mastering
- Jacob Brackman – composer
- Ed Caraeff – back cover photo, cover photo
- Larry Ciancia – project assistant
- Sheryl Farber – editorial supervisor
- Freddy Gardner – composer
- Paul Glanz – composer
- Chase Goldman – project assistant
- Bernie Grundman – mastering
- Rachel Gutek – art direction, design
- Amelia Halverson – photo editing
- Jac Holzman – compilation producer
- Eddie Kramer – composer
- Kris Kristofferson – composer
- Buzzy Linhart – composer
- Billy Mernit – composer
- Patrick Milligan – project supervisor
- Ted Olson – compilation producer
- John Prine – composer
- Jim Ryan – composer
- Susanne Savage – A&R
- Carly Simon – composer, primary artist
- Peter Simon – booklet
- Matthew Taoatao – packaging manager
- Alicia Yaffe – product manager

== Charts ==
Chart performance for These Are the Good Old Days: The Carly Simon and Jac Holzman Story
Chart (2023)	Peak position
Hungarian Physical Albums (MAHASZ)	34
