= Songs from the Trees =

Songs from the Trees (A Musical Memoir Collection)

Compilation album by Carly Simon
- Released: November 20, 2015
- Recorded: 1964–2015
- Genre: Pop rock
- Length: 1:52:42
- Label: Rhino

Carly Simon chronology
Playlist: The Very Best of Carly Simon (2014)	Songs from the Trees (A Musical Memoir Collection) (2015)	Live at Grand Central (2023)

Songs from the Trees (A Musical Memoir Collection) is a two-disc compilation set by American singer-songwriter Carly Simon, released on November 20, 2015.

The collection was released as a tie-in to Simon's memoir Boys in the Trees. It contains newly remastered versions of songs spanning 23 years of her career, ranging from 1964's "Winkin', Blinkin', and Nod" (as The Simon Sisters), through 1987's "Two Hot Girls (On a Hot Summer Night)" from the album Coming Around Again. Also included are two previously unreleased songs: "Showdown" (originally recorded during the sessions for her 1978 album Boys in the Trees) and "I Can't Thank You Enough", a brand new song written and performed with her son Ben Taylor.

== Reception ==
Professional ratings
Review scores
Source	Rating
AllMusic	4/5 stars

AllMusic rated the album 4 stars out of 5, writing "Pointedly not a greatest-hits collection, the double-disc compilation instead is a soundtrack to Carly Simon's 2015 memoir Boys in the Trees. Surely, there are hits here -- not all of them, but "You're So Vain", "Mockingbird", "You Belong to Me", and "Anticipation" are -- but there are also some deep cuts, and other assorted rarities. Everything here shifts focus toward Simon the singer/songwriter, seek out Rhino's 2002 set Anthology for a fuller portrait of Simon as a hit-maker; turn here if you want to get a sense of what Simon believes truly reflects her soul as an artist."

== Track listing ==
All songs have been remastered for this collection. Credits adapted from the album's liner notes.

=== Disc 1 ===
No.	Title	Writer(s)	Original album	Length
1.	"Boys in the Trees"	Carly Simon	Boys in the Trees (1978)	3:14
2.	"Winkin', Blinkin', and Nod (as The Simon Sisters)"	Eugene Field; Lucy Simon	Meet the Simon Sisters (1964)	2:18
3.	"Orpheus"	Simon	Hello Big Man (1983)	3:52
4.	"Older Sister"	Simon	Hotcakes (1974)	3:09
5.	"It Was So Easy"	Simon; Jacob Brackman	No Secrets (1972)	3:09
6.	"Embrace Me, You Child"	Simon	No Secrets (1972)	4:10
7.	"Hello Big Man"	Simon; Peter Wood	Hello Big Man (1983)	5:29
8.	"Two Hot Girls (On a Hot Summer Night)"	Simon	Coming Around Again (1987)	4:52
9.	"It Happens Everyday"	Simon	Hello Big Man (1983)	2:45
10.	"His Friends Are More Than Fond Of Robin"	Simon	No Secrets (1972)	3:03
11.	"I'm All It Takes To Make You Happy"	Simon	Clouds in My Coffee (1995)	3:36
12.	"That's the Way I've Always Heard It Should Be"	Simon; Brackman	Carly Simon (1971)	4:18
13.	"I've Got to Have You"	Kris Kristofferson	Anticipation (1971)	4:45
14.	"Anticipation"	Simon	Anticipation (1971)	3:21
15.	"Legend in Your Own Time"	Simon	Anticipation (1971)	3:44
16.	"Three Days"	Simon	Anticipation (1971)	3:17
Total length:				59:03

=== Disc 2 ===
No.	Title	Writer(s)	Original album	Length
1.	"Julie Through the Glass"	Simon	Anticipation (1971)	3:22
2.	"We Have No Secrets"	Simon	No Secrets (1972)	3:58
3.	"You're So Vain"	Simon	No Secrets (1972)	4:19
4.	"Mind on My Man"	Simon	Hotcakes (1974)	3:00
5.	"Mockingbird (with James Taylor)"	Inez Foxx; Charlie Foxx; Taylor^{[a]}	Hotcakes (1974)	4:13
6.	"After the Storm"	Simon	Playing Possum (1975)	2:50
7.	"Haunting"	Simon	Boys in the Trees (1978)	2:29
8.	"In Times When My Head"	Simon	Another Passenger (1976)	3:30
9.	"You Belong to Me"	Simon; Michael McDonald	Boys in the Trees (1978)	3:52
10.	"We're So Close"	Simon	Spy (1979)	5:10
11.	"From the Heart"	Simon	Torch (1981)	2:51
12.	"Come Upstairs"	Simon	Come Upstairs (1980)	4:18
13.	"The Right Thing to Do"	Simon	No Secrets (1972)	3:00
14.	"Showdown"	Simon	Previously unreleased	3:26
15.	"I Can't Thank You Enough"	Simon; Ben Taylor	New song	3:23
Total length:				53:41

Notes

- ^a signifies a writer by additional lyrics

== Personnel ==
- Ryan Casey – engineer
- Larry Ciancia – mixing
- Charles Close – producer
- Reggie Collins – project assistant
- Ramelro Crawford – project assistant
- Eugene Field – composer
- Frank Filipetti – mixing
- Inez and Charlie Foxx – composer
- Lew Hahn – engineer
- Jeri Heiden – art direction
- Erin Kincaid – project coordinator
- Meghan La Roque – executive assistant, project manager
- Mike Mainieri – producer
- Arif Mardin – producer
- Michael McDonald – composer
- Jimmy Parr – engineer
- Richard Perry – producer
- David Ponak – licensing
- Paul Samwell-Smith – producer
- Susanne Savage – project assistant
- Miguel Scott – engineer, mixing
- The Simon Sisters (Lucy and Carly) – primary artist
- Carly Simon – compilation producer, composer, instrumentation, liner notes, primary artist, vocals
- Lucy Simon – composer
- Ben Taylor – composer, engineer, instrumentation, mixing, vocals
- James Taylor – composer, primary artist
- Ted Templeman – producer
- Julie Wolf – instrumentation, vocals
- Steve Woolard – project assistant

== Charts ==
Chart (2016)	Peak position
Irish Albums (IRMA)	68
