= Carly Simon Collector's Edition =

Compilation album by Carly Simon
- Released: March 31, 2009
- Genre: Rock
- Length: 112:11
- Label: Madacy Entertainment

Carly Simon chronology
This Kind of Love (2008)	Carly Simon Collector's Edition (2009)	Never Been Gone (2009)

Professional ratings
Review scores
Source	Rating
AllMusic	3/5 stars

Carly Simon Collector's Edition is a compilation boxed set by the American singer-songwriter Carly Simon. Housed in a tin box, it was released by Madacy Entertainment, on March 31, 2009.

The thirty songs are selections from Simon's first eleven studio albums released from 1971 to 1983, her Elektra and Warner Brothers years. This compilation was produced and manufactured by Warner Custom Products (a Warner Music Group company) and was marketed and distributed by Madacy Entertainment from St. Laurent, Quebec, Canada. Within the tin box is a cardboard case that holds the three discs, as well as a booklet detailing Simon's career and accomplishments up to the present time. The photographs used on the cover of the tin box, the case cover and within the booklet are by Bob Gothard and are from the liner notes and photo shoot from Simon's 1994 album, Letters Never Sent.

== Track listing ==
Credits adapted from the album's liner notes.

=== Disc 1 ===
No.	Title	Writer(s)	Original album	Length
1.	"Anticipation"	Carly Simon	Anticipation (1971)	3:22
2.	"The Right Thing to Do"	Simon	No Secrets (1972)	2:59
3.	"That's the Way I've Always Heard It Should Be"	Simon; Jacob Brackman	Carly Simon (1971)	4:17
4.	"Haven't Got Time for the Pain"	Simon	Hotcakes (1974)	3:55
5.	"Waterfall"	Simon	Playing Possum (1975)	3:32
6.	"Mockingbird (with James Taylor)"	Inez Foxx; Charlie Foxx; Taylor^{[a]}	Hotcakes (1974)	4:12
7.	"Legend in Your Own Time"	Simon	Anticipation (1971)	3:45
8.	"Back Down to Earth"	Simon	Boys in the Trees (1978)	3:08
9.	"We Have No Secrets"	Simon	No Secrets (1972)	3:58
10.	"Darkness 'Til Dawn"	Simon; Brackman	Another Passenger (1976)	3:19
Total length:				36:29

=== Disc 2 ===
No.	Title	Writer(s)	Original album	Length
1.	"You're So Vain"	Simon	No Secrets (1972)	4:19
2.	"Jesse"	Simon	Come Upstairs (1980)	4:17
3.	"Vengeance"	Simon	Spy (1979)	4:14
4.	"You Belong to Me"	Simon; Michael McDonald	Boys in the Trees (1978)	3:52
5.	"Come Upstairs"	Simon	Come Upstairs (1980)	4:19
6.	"Playing Possum"	Simon	Playing Possum (1975)	3:58
7.	"You Know What to Do"	Simon; Brackman; Peter Wood; Mike Mainieri	Hello Big Man (1983)	4:13
8.	"The Girl You Think You See"	Simon; Brackman	Anticipation (1971)	3:06
9.	"Take Me As I Am"	Simon; Mainieri; Sid McGinnis	Come Upstairs (1980)	4:51
10.	"One More Time"	Simon; Brackman	Carly Simon (1971)	3:32
Total length:				40:43

=== Disc 3 ===
No.	Title	Writer(s)	Original album	Length
1.	"Never Been Gone"	Simon; Brackman	Spy (1979)	3:36
2.	"Devoted to You"	Felice and Boudleaux Bryant	Boys in the Trees (1978)	2:31
3.	"Not a Day Goes By"	Stephen Sondheim	Torch (1981)	2:43
4.	"Boys in the Trees"	Simon	Boys in the Trees (1978)	3:14
5.	"It Happens Every Day"	Simon	Hello Big Man (1983)	2:47
6.	"We're So Close"	Simon	Spy (1979)	5:11
7.	"Julie Through the Glass"	Simon	Anticipation (1971)	3:25
8.	"Older Sister"	Simon	Hotcakes (1974)	3:07
9.	"I Get Along Without You Very Well"	Hoagy Carmichael	Torch (1981)	3:48
10.	"For Old Times Sake"	Simon; Brackman	Boys in the Trees (1978)	3:40
Total length:				34:05

Notes

- ^a signifies a writer by additional lyrics
