= Carly Simon: Live at Grand Central =

1995 concert special by Carly Simon

- Original VHS cover

Video by Carly Simon
- Released: April 1995
- Recorded: April 2, 1995
- Venue: Midtown Manhattan, New York City
- Genre: Live, pop, adult contemporary
- Length: 70 minutes

Cover of 2023 Blu-ray release

Carly Simon: Live at Grand Central is a 1995 concert special that aired on Lifetime Television. Performed in the middle of New York City's Grand Central Terminal, the surprise concert was a prelude to Simon's first concert tour in 14 years. It featured Simon and a live band performing the majority of her Letters Never Sent album, as well as some of her hits such as "That's the Way I've Always Heard It Should Be", "Anticipation", "Legend in Your Own Time", "Haven't Got Time for the Pain", "Jesse", "Coming Around Again", and "Let the River Run". It was directed by English music video and film director Nigel Dick.

For this special, Simon was nominated for two CableACE Awards: Performance in a Music Special and Original Song for "Touched by the Sun", winning for the latter.

== Production and release history ==
It was Jackie Onassis's idea for Simon to perform in Grand Central. Simon wrote the song "Touched by the Sun" for Onassis, which originally appeared on Simon's album Letters Never Sent (1994). The surprise performance "stopped commuters in their tracks", and aired on Lifetime on May 21, 1995. Simon was also featured in an episode of the Lifetime original series Intimate Portrait, which was broadcast the same night.

Live at Grand Central was released on home video on December 12, 1995. The concert was restored and re-released on January 27, 2023 on Blu-ray, Vinyl and CD, and can be purchased through Simon's official website. Alongside the announcement, a video of "Like a River" from the concert was released, which was not featured on its original release.

== Track listings ==
All tracks composed by Carly Simon; except where indicated.

=== Original 1995 release ===
1. "Touched by the Sun"
2. "Haven't Got Time for the Pain" (Simon/Jacob Brackman)
3. "Letters Never Sent" (Simon/Brackman)
4. "I've Got to Have You" (Kris Kristofferson)
5. "Anticipation"
6. "Halfway 'Round the World"
7. "Legend in Your Own Time"
8. "Jesse" (Simon/Mike Mainieri)
9. "De Bat (Fly in Me Face)"
10. "Coming Around Again"
11. "Davy"
12. "That's the Way I've Always Heard It Should Be" (Simon/Brackman)
13. "Let the River Run"
14. "We Have No Secrets"

=== Revised 2023 re-release ===
1. "Touched by the Sun"
2. "Anticipation"
3. "I've Got to Have You" (Kris Kristofferson)
4. "We Have No Secrets"
5. "Haven't Got Time for the Pain" (Simon/Jacob Brackman)
6. "Jesse" (Simon/Mike Mainieri)
7. "That's the Way I've Always Heard It Should Be" (Simon/Brackman)
8. "Letters Never Sent" (Simon/Brackman)
9. "Legend in Your Own Time"
10. "De Bat (Fly in Me Face)"
11. "Davy"
12. "Halfway 'Round the World"
13. "Like a River"
14. "Coming Around Again"
15. "Let the River Run"

== Awards ==
Year	Award	Category	Work	Recipient(s)	Result	Ref.
1995	CableACE Award	Original Song	"Touched by the Sun"	Carly Simon	Won	
1995	CableACE Award	Performance in a Music Special or Series	Live at Grand Central	Carly Simon	Nominated	
1995	CableACE Award	Directing a Music Special or Series	Live at Grand Central	Nigel Dick	Nominated	

== Live album ==
Live at Grand Central

Live album by Carly Simon
- Released: January 27, 2023
- Recorded: April 2, 1995
- Length: 64:57
- Label: C'est Music; Arista
- Producer: Frank Filipetti

Carly Simon chronology
Songs from the Trees (A Musical Memoir Collection) (2015)	Live at Grand Central (2023)	These Are the Good Old Days: The Carly Simon and Jac Holzman Story (2023)

Professional ratings
Review scores
Source	Rating
American Songwriter	4/5 stars
PopMatters	7/10 stars

Live at Grand Central was made available for the first time on vinyl and CD on January 27, 2023, making it Simon's second live album, following Greatest Hits Live in 1988.

A review from Riff magazine stated: "This new release of Live at Grand Central captures [Simon's] command of the stage beautifully, and the remixing does it the justice it deserves."

=== Track listing ===
Credits adapted from the album's liner notes.

No.	Title	Writer(s)	Length
1.	"Touched by the Sun"	Carly Simon	5:43
2.	"Anticipation"	Simon	3:52
3.	"I've Got to Have You"	Kris Kristofferson	4:37
4.	"We Have No Secrets"	Simon	4:55
5.	"Haven't Got Time for the Pain"	Simon; Jacob Brackman	3:40
6.	"Jesse"	Simon; Mike Mainieri	4:23
7.	"That's the Way I've Always Heard It Should Be"	Simon; Brackman	4:23
8.	"Letters Never Sent"	Simon; Brackman	4:09
9.	"Legend in Your Own Time"	Simon	4:16
10.	"De Bat (Fly in Me Face)"	Simon	3:16
11.	"Davy"	Simon	3:37
12.	"Halfway 'Round the World"	Simon	4:57
13.	"Like a River"	Simon	4:55
14.	"Coming Around Again"	Simon	4:48
15.	"Let the River Run"	Simon	3:22
Total length:			64:57

=== Personnel ===
- Teese Gohl – music director, keyboards
- Rick Marotta – drums
- Doug Wimbish – bass
- Peter Calo – guitar
- Dirk Ziff – guitar
- Mick Rossi – keyboards
- Mindy Jostyn – violin
- Eric Bazilian – mandolin
- Marc Cohn – backing vocals
- Jerry Barnes – backing vocals
- Katreese Barnes – backing vocals
- Curtis King – backing vocals

== Charts ==
Chart (2023)	Peak position
US Top Album Sales (Billboard)	100
