= The Best of Carly Simon =

Greatest hits album by Carly Simon
- Released: November 24, 1975
- Recorded: 1970–1975
- Genre: Rock
- Length: 38:18
- Label: Elektra
- Producers: Eddie Kramer, Richard Perry, Paul Samwell-Smith

Carly Simon chronology
| Playing Possum (1975) | The Best of Carly Simon (1975) | Another Passenger (1976) |

The Best of Carly Simon is singer-songwriter Carly Simon's first greatest hits album, released by Elektra Records, on November 24, 1975.

Covering the first five years of her career, The Best of Carly Simon includes eight top 20 hit singles from her first five albums: Carly Simon, Anticipation (both 1971), No Secrets (1972), Hotcakes (1974), and Playing Possum (1975), as well as two album cuts from No Secrets: "Night Owl" and "We Have No Secrets", the latter of which was released as the B-side to the single "The Right Thing to Do" in 1973.

== Overview ==
For many years, this was Simon's only greatest hits collection, and as a result, it became her best selling album. In the late 1990s, sales in the United States alone stood at over three million copies. However, in later years the collection could not be considered a complete or definitive representation of Simon's best or most popular work because it did not include her major hits from the mid-1970s onward, such as "Nobody Does It Better", "You Belong to Me", "Jesse", "Coming Around Again", and "Let the River Run". The fact that Simon had changed record labels several times (moving from Elektra to Warner Bros. to Epic to Arista) made a more wide-ranging collection a difficult proposition. A live album, Greatest Hits Live (1988), went some way to rectifying this issue, but the original recorded versions were eventually collected on the three-disc box set Clouds in My Coffee (1995), the two-disc set Anthology (2002), and the single-disc collections The Very Best of Carly Simon: Nobody Does It Better (1998) and Reflections: Carly Simon's Greatest Hits (2004). Reflections: Carly Simon's Greatest Hits went on to become a great critical and commercial success, and was certified Gold by both the Recording Industry Association of America on March 2, 2007 and the British Phonographic Industry on July 22, 2013.

== Reception ==
Professional ratings
Review scores
| Source | Rating |
|---|---|
| AllMusic | 4.5/5 stars |
| Christgau's Record Guide | C+ |

In a retrospective review for AllMusic, Jim Newsom rated the album 41/2-stars-out-of-5, and wrote: "Opening with the powerful "That's the Way I've Always Heard It Should Be", and including four tunes from the classic No Secrets album, Simon's insightful lyrics and evocative voice remain fresh years later. This album is a good starting point for those interested in discovering why." Newsom also singled out the track "Anticipation": "...with its classic "I rehearsed those words just late last night," and the repetitive coda "these are the good old days," though merely a ketchup commercial to a later generation, still retains its power here in the original version.

A contemporary review from Robert Christgau stated: "Given her self-knowledge and her fans' taste, a compilation isn't going to get her at her best, though this does collect some of her more attractive melodies. Light a fart for the two big Jacob Brackman statements: "Attitude Dancing", which means exactly what it says, and "Haven't Got Time for the Pain", which doesn't, not quite--the most insidious let's-write-God-a-love-song to date."

== Track listing ==
Credits adapted from the album's liner notes.

Side one
| No. | Title | Writer(s) | Original album | Length |
|---|---|---|---|---|
| 1. | "That's the Way I've Always Heard It Should Be" | Carly Simon; Jacob Brackman | Carly Simon (1971) | 4:15 |
| 2. | "The Right Thing to Do" | Simon | No Secrets (1972) | 2:57 |
| 3. | "Mockingbird" (with James Taylor) | Inez Foxx; Charlie Foxx; Taylor^{[a]} | Hotcakes (1974) | 4:11 |
| 4. | "Legend in Your Own Time" | Simon | Anticipation (1971) | 3:45 |
| 5. | "Haven't Got Time for the Pain" | Simon; Brackman | Hotcakes | 3:50 |

Side two
| No. | Title | Writer(s) | Original album | Length |
|---|---|---|---|---|
| 6. | "You're So Vain" | Simon | No Secrets | 4:17 |
| 7. | "(We Have) No Secrets" | Simon | No Secrets | 3:57 |
| 8. | "Night Owl" | Taylor | No Secrets | 3:47 |
| 9. | "Anticipation" | Simon | Anticipation | 3:19 |
| 10. | "Attitude Dancing" | Simon; Brackman | Playing Possum (1975) | 4:00 |
| Total length: | | | | 38:18 |

Note:

- ^a signifies a writer by additional lyrics

== Personnel ==
=== Musicians ===
- Carly Simon – lead vocals (all tracks), piano (tracks 1, 2, 4–6, 9, 10), background vocals (tracks 2, 10), acoustic guitar (tracks 4, 7, 9), string arrangement (track 6)
- Jim Ryan – electric guitar (tracks 3, 4, 8, 9), bass (tracks 2, 4, 9), acoustic guitar (tracks 4, 5, 9), guitar (tracks 6, 7)
- Richard Perry – production (tracks 2, 3, 5–8, 10), percussion (track 6)
- Kirby Johnson – string conducting & string arrangement (tracks 2, 7), horn conducting & horn arrangement (track 2), electric piano (track 7)
- Paul Buckmaster – string conducting, string arrangement, woodwind conducting & woodwind arrangement (track 5), string orchestration (track 6)
- Klaus Voormann – bass (tracks 3, 5–7)
- Andy Newmark – percussion (tracks 4, 9), drums (track 2)
- Jim Keltner – drums (tracks 3, 5, 8)
- Jim Gordon – drums (tracks 6, 7, 10)
- Ray Cooper – congas (tracks 2, 8)
- Dr. John – piano & organ (track 3)
- Ralph MacDonald – percussion (tracks 3, 5)
- James Taylor – vocals (track 3), acoustic guitar (track 5)
- Bobby Keys – baritone saxophone (track 3), tenor saxophone (track 8)
- Paul Samwell-Smith – production (tracks 4, 9)
- John Ryan – acoustic bass (tracks 4, 9)
- Paul Glanz – piano (tracks 4, 9)
- Paul Riser – string arrangement & horn arrangement (track 10)
- Eddie Kramer – production (track 1)
- Paul Griffin – piano (track 1)
- Tony Levin – bass (track 1)
- Jimmy Johnson – drums (track 1)
- Ed Freeman – string arrangement (track 1)
- Liza Strike – background vocals (track 2)
- Vicki Brown – background vocals (track 2)
- Robbie Robertson – electric guitar (track 3)
- Michael Brecker – tenor saxophone (track 3)
- Carl Hall – background vocals (track 5)
- Tasha Thomas – background vocals (track 5)
- Lani Groves – background vocals (track 5)
- Paul Keough – acoustic guitar (track 7)
- Nicky Hopkins – piano (track 8)
- Bonnie Bramlett – background vocals (track 8)
- Doris Troy – background vocals (track 8)
- Paul McCartney – background vocals (track 8)
- Linda McCartney – background vocals (track 8)
- Willie Weeks – bass (track 10)
- Andrew Gold – guitar (track 10)
- Eddie Bongo – congas (track 10)
- Carole King – background vocals (track 10)
- Abigale Haness – background vocals (track 10)
- Kenny Moore – background vocals (track 10)

=== Credits ===
- WCI Record Group – CDD pre-mastering
- Arlyne Rothberg, Inc. – management
- Glenn Christensen – art direction
- Albert Mackenzie Watson – photo

== Charts ==
| Chart (1975/76) | Peak position |
|---|---|
| Australian Albums (Kent Music Report) | 42 |
| Canada Top Albums/CDs (RPM) | 40 |
| US Billboard 200 | 17 |
| US Cash Box Top 100 Albums | 16 |

== Certifications ==
| Region | Certification | Certified units/sales |
|---|---|---|
| Canada (Music Canada) | Gold | 50,000^{^} |
| Australia (ARIA) | 5× Platinum | 350,000^{^} |
| United States (RIAA) | 3× Platinum | 3,000,000^{^} |
^{^} Shipments figures based on certification alone.
