= This Kind of Love =

Studio album by Carly Simon
- Released: April 29, 2008
- Recorded: 2007
- Studios: Legacy Recording Studios (New York City, New York); Parr Audio (Oak Bluff, Massachusetts); Carly's Kitchen (Martha's Vineyard); WaJeRo Sound (Los Angeles, California)
- Genre: Pop
- Length: 55:04
- Label: Hear Music
- Producers: Carly Simon Frank Filipetti Jimmy Webb

Carly Simon chronology
Into White (2007)	This Kind of Love (2008)	Carly Simon Collector's Edition (2009)

This Kind of Love is the 22nd studio album by American singer-songwriter Carly Simon, released by Hear Music, on April 29, 2008.

Simon's first album of original material since The Bedroom Tapes in 2000, it would be her last album of original material until the release of Comes in Waves in 2026. It debuted at No. 15 on the U.S. Billboard 200 chart, selling about 23,000 copies in its first week. By late 2009, the album had sold 124,000 copies.

== Background ==
This Kind of Love was released via the Starbucks-owned label Hear Music and was to be sold in Starbucks outlets as well as by general music retailers. To Simon's disappointment, Starbucks announced that it had ceased day-to-day operations of Hear Music five days before the release date of This Kind of Love. Starbucks reneged on its agreement to stock the album in stores and reduced her advance after Simon had spent $100,000 on recording sessions in Martha's Vineyard. In 2009, Simon sued Starbucks for "concealment of material facts", "tortious interference" with Simon's contract, and "unlawful, unfair and fraudulent business practices". Simon's lawsuit was dismissed in favor of Starbucks.

== Production ==
Simon cited Brazilian music as an influence for the thirteen-song album. She worked on the album for two years.

== Reception ==
Professional ratings
Aggregate scores
Source	Rating
Metacritic	60/100
Review scores
Source	Rating
AllMusic	3.5/5 stars
ARTISTdirect	3/5 stars
PopMatters	8/10 stars

This Kind of Love received general acclaim from music critics. AllMusic stated "the aching 'So Many People to Love' is a sparse, spontaneous, sadly sweet finger-popping swing tune... this is the kind of pop song that is perfect for Simon's voice." The track "Hold Out Your Heart" was also singled out for praise; "The skeletal guitar that accompanies her on the first lines are quietly stunning. When the strings and backing vocals enter, they wipe away the years of 'pop music progression' and take listeners back to a purer time -- when lyrics would communicate in sync with music written specifically to offer a dramatic aural portrait of an emotional slice of life or an episodic one. It's graceful and quite beautiful when it reaches up and everything swells." He concluded: "This is the best album of mostly original material she's cut since 1979's Spy."

The Boston Globe stated "her voice is huskier, veined with the fine lines of age, but that only enhances the sultry sound of the Vineyard's favorite songbird, the still-too-sexy-for-her-shirt Carly Simon. The original songs on This Kind of Love are a mishmash of styles: poppy, jazzy, or seasoned with a dash of Brazilian Tropicana. Thirty-six years after her breakthrough No Secrets, Simon is still exploring the vicissitudes of togetherness."

Writing for PopMatters, Steve Horowitz was also enthusiastic, rating the album 8 out of 10 stars and writing "Simon has prodigious gifts that seem so effortless that it’s easy to mistake the laidback elements of her songs for laziness. That would definitely be a mistake. The carefree aspect of her music disguises the intensity of the underlying feelings expressed. Simon’s artistry can be found in how she expresses the tension between these conflicting elements," continuing "Simon uses Brazilian rhythms to create a calm façade as she sings about life, love, and death. The music mostly sways like a gentle, tropical breeze. She sings in an unhurried fashion, rarely revving up the tempo, instead letting the percussion section do that for her. And she rarely stretches for a note. That famous ache in her voice so prominent in her early work from the ‘70s is rarely found here. Instead, she sounds mellow... Don’t mistake its pleasant surfaces for laidback listening. There’s much more to it than initially meets the ear."

== Track listing ==
Credits adapted from the album's liner notes.

No.	Title	Writer(s)	Length
1.	"This Kind of Love"	Carly Simon; Jimmy Webb; Peter Calo	4:56
2.	"Hold Out Your Heart"	Simon; Peter Calo	3:27
3.	"People Say a Lot"	Simon	6:28
4.	"Island"	Ben Taylor	4:24
5.	"How Can You Ever Forget"	Simon; David Saw	2:41
6.	"Hola Soleil"	Simon; B. Taylor; Jacob Brackman; Webb; Calo; Saw	4:55
7.	"In My Dreams"	Simon; Webb; Calo	4:21
8.	"When We're Together"	Sally Taylor	4:18
9.	"So Many People to Love"	Simon; Wade Robson; Carole Bayer Sager	3:51
10.	"They Just Want You to be There"	Simon	4:19
11.	"The Last Samba"	Webb	3:16
12.	"Sangre Dolce"	Simon	4:26
13.	"Too Soon to Say Goodbye"	Simon	3:42
Total length:			55:04

== Credits ==
=== Musicians ===
- Carly Simon – vocals, electric piano (2, 11, 13), acoustic piano (5), synthesizers (5, 13), percussion (5, 11), acoustic guitar (10), guitars (11), bass (11)
- Sammy Merendino – programming (3)
- Tesse Gohl – synthesizers (6)
- Peter Calo – guitars (1–3, 5–8, 10, 13), acoustic guitar (4), electric guitar (4), mandolin (5), dobro (8, 10)
- David Saw – guitars (1, 2, 5, 6)
- Ben Taylor – acoustic guitar (4)
- Ben Mauro – guitars (9)
- Michael Lockwood – guitar solo (12)
- Lincoln Goines – bass (1, 2, 4–6, 8, 10, 11, 13)
- Jimmy Webb – bass (3), synthesizers (4, 10), acoustic piano (7, 11, 13)
- Tom "T-Bone" Wolk – bass (11)
- Robby Ameen – drums (1, 2, 4, 8, 10, 13)
- Steve Gadd – drums (11)
- Cyro Baptista – percussion (1–4, 6, 8, 11)
- Rick Marotta – percussion (1–3, 6, 8), cajóns (11)
- Aaron Heick – saxophone (1), English horn (5), alto flute (7, 11)
- William Galison – harmonica (13)
- Elena Barere – concertmaster (1–6, 8)

Background vocalists

- Jill Dell'Abate – backing vocals (1, 2, 4–6, 10, 13)
- Frank Filipetti – backing vocals (1, 5, 6, 10)
- Tawatha Agee – backing vocals (2, 6, 13)
- Vaneese Thomas – backing vocals (2, 6, 13)
- Fonzi Thornton – backing vocals (2, 6, 13)
- Peter Calo – backing vocals (3, 4)
- Jimmy Parr – backing vocals (3)
- David Saw – backing vocals (3, 5, 13)
- Carly Simon – backing vocals (3–5, 10, 13)
- Ben Taylor – backing vocals (3–5, 13)
- Jimmy Webb – backing vocals (3)
- Sheree Brown – backing vocals (9)

Children's Choir (Tracks 1 & 6)

- Sarah Barnaby, Ben Brooks, Amy Cass, Melanie Clarke, Aidan Cron, Emily Graffeo, Ryan King, Josie Mangold, Lucas Mangold, Emily Powers and Amanda Scopelliti

Music arrangements

- Jimmy Webb – arrangements, orchestration (5)
- Tesse Gohl – orchestration (1–4, 6, 8, 11), string arrangements (11)
- David Campbell – string arrangements (9)
- Wade Robson – string arrangements (9), vocal arrangements (9)

=== Production ===
- Frank Filipetti – producer (1–8, 10, 11, 13)
- Jimmy Webb – producer (1–8, 10, 11, 13)
- Carly Simon – additional production (1–8, 10, 11, 13), producer (12), liner notes
- Ben Taylor – additional production (1–8, 10, 11, 13)
- Wade Robson – producer (9)
- Jimmy Parr – associate producer
- Peter Calo – music director (1–8, 10, 11, 13)
- Jill Dell'Abate – production coordinator, contractor
- Tommy Steele – art direction, design
- Jodie Wright – webmaster
- Lynn Goldsmith – photography
- Meghan La Roque – personal assistant
- Amanda Ziskin – personal assistant

Technical credits

- Bob Ludwig – mastering at Gateway Mastering (Portland, Maine)
- Frank Filipetti – engineer, mixing
- Derik Lee – additional engineer, assistant engineer
- Jimmy Parr – additional engineer
- Carly Simon – additional engineer
- Ben Taylor – additional engineer
- Missy Webb – assistant engineer

== Charts ==
Chart (2008)	Peak position
US Billboard 200	15
