= Reflections: Carly Simon's Greatest Hits =

Greatest hits album by Carly Simon
- Released: May 4, 2004
- Recorded: 1970–1999
- Genre: Pop rock
- Length: 79:23
- Label: BMG Heritage/WEA International/Rhino Entertainment

Carly Simon chronology
Anthology (2002)	Reflections: Carly Simon's Greatest Hits (2004)	Moonlight Serenade (2005)

Reflections: Carly Simon's Greatest Hits is the fourth greatest hits album by American singer-songwriter Carly Simon, released on May 4, 2004.

Containing 20 tracks and nearly 80 minutes of music; the album compiles 19 of Simon's most popular songs, presented roughly in chronological order, ranging from "That's the Way I've Always Heard It Should Be" from her 1971 eponymous debut album, through "Like A River" and "Touched by the Sun" from her 16th studio album Letters Never Sent (1994). The song "Amity", a duet with her daughter Sally Taylor, originally appeared on the soundtrack album to the 1999 film Anywhere but Here, and has been remixed and included as a bonus track.

An international version of the album, released mainly for the UK market, followed on June 8, 2004. While also containing 20 tracks, the international version consists of a different mix of songs, such as "Why" from the soundtrack album to the 1982 film Soup For One, a Top 10 hit single on the UK chart. Unlike the North American version, the international version does not run in chronological order.

== Reception ==
Professional ratings
Review scores
Source	Rating
AllMusic	4.5/5 stars

Reflections: Carly Simon’s Greatest Hits was met with widespread critical and commercial success. It peaked at No. 22 on the U.S. Billboard 200, becoming Simon's first Top 40 release on this chart since Coming Around Again in 1987, and remained on the chart for 19 weeks. On March 2, 2007, it was certified Gold by the RIAA for sales of over 500,000 copies in the U.S. alone. The international version was also very successful; it peaked at No. 25 on the UK Official Albums Chart, and remained on the chart for seven weeks. On July 22, 2013, it was certified Gold by the BPI for selling over 100,000 copies in the UK.

AllMusic rated the North American version 41/2-stars-out-of-5, praising it as a satisfying single-disc overview of Simon's extensive catalog; "Spanning nearly 30 years and featuring 20 songs, the collection has all of the big hits, from such '70s standards as "That's the Way I've Always Heard It Should Be", "Anticipation", "The Right Thing to Do", "You're So Vain", "Haven't Got Time for the Pain", and "Nobody Does It Better" to the late-'80s comeback hit "Let the River Run". Certainly, there are some listeners who are looking for a concise career-spanning disc, and for them, this suits the bill very well.

== Track listings ==
Credits adapted from the album's liner notes.

=== North American version ===
No.	Title	Writer(s)	Original album	Length
1.	"That's the Way I've Always Heard It Should Be"	Carly Simon; Jacob Brackman	Carly Simon (1971)	4:18
2.	"Legend in Your Own Time"	Simon	Anticipation (1971)	3:46
3.	"Anticipation"	Simon	Anticipation (1971)	3:22
4.	"The Right Thing to Do"	Simon	No Secrets (1972)	3:00
5.	"You're So Vain"	Simon	No Secrets (1972)	4:20
6.	"Mockingbird (with James Taylor)"	Inez Foxx; Charlie Foxx; J. Taylor^{[a]}	Hotcakes (1974)	3:50
7.	"Haven't Got Time for the Pain"	Simon; Brackman	Hotcakes (1974)	3:55
8.	"Nobody Does It Better"	Carole Bayer Sager; Marvin Hamlisch	The Spy Who Loved Me (soundtrack) (1977)	3:44
9.	"You Belong to Me (Single version)"	Simon; Michael McDonald	Boys in the Trees (1978)	3:14
10.	"Jesse"	Simon	Come Upstairs (1980)	4:19
11.	"Coming Around Again"	Simon	Coming Around Again (1987)	3:42
12.	"Give Me All Night (Single version)"	Simon; Gerard McMahon	Coming Around Again (1987)	4:04
13.	"The Stuff That Dreams Are Made Of (Single version)"	Simon	Coming Around Again (1987)	4:27
14.	"All I Want Is You"	Simon; Brackman; Andy Goldmark	Coming Around Again (1987)	3:59
15.	"Let the River Run"	Simon	Working Girl (soundtrack) (1989)	3:43
16.	"Better Not Tell Her (Single version)"	Simon	Have You Seen Me Lately (1990)	4:48
17.	"Love of My Life"	Simon	This Is My Life (soundtrack) (1992)	3:34
18.	"Like A River (Single version)"	Simon	Letters Never Sent (1994)	4:48
19.	"Touched by the Sun"	Simon	Letters Never Sent (1994)	5:28
20.	"Amity (with Sally Taylor) (Alternate Mix)"	Simon; S. Taylor	Anywhere but Here (soundtrack) (1999)	3:02
Total length:				79:23

=== International version ===
Credits adapted from the album's liner notes.

No.	Title	Writer(s)	Original album	Length
1.	"You're So Vain"	Simon	No Secrets (1972)	4:20
2.	"Anticipation"	Simon	Anticipation (1971)	3:22
3.	"Nobody Does It Better"	Sager; Hamlisch	The Spy Who Loved Me (soundtrack) (1977)	3:44
4.	"That's the Way I've Always Heard It Should Be"	Simon; Brackman	Carly Simon (1971)	4:18
5.	"Coming Around Again"	Simon	Coming Around Again (1987)	3:42
6.	"The Right Thing to Do"	Simon	No Secrets (1972)	3:00
7.	"Let the River Run"	Simon	Working Girl (soundtrack) (1989)	3:43
8.	"I’ve Got to Have You"	Kris Kristofferson	Anticipation (1971)	4:45
9.	"Mockingbird (with James Taylor)"	I. Foxx; C. Foxx; J. Taylor^{[a]}	Hotcakes (1974)	3:50
10.	"Legend in Your Own Time"	Simon	Anticipation (1971)	3:46
11.	"Why (Single version)"	Bernard Edwards; Nile Rodgers	Soup for One (soundtrack) (1982)	3:33
12.	"We Have No Secrets"	Simon	No Secrets (1972)	3:57
13.	"Haven't Got Time for the Pain"	Simon; Brackman	Hotcakes (1974)	3:55
14.	"You Belong to Me (Single version)"	Simon; McDonald	Boys in the Trees (1978)	3:14
15.	"Jesse"	Simon	Come Upstairs (1980)	4:19
16.	"Boys in the Trees"	Simon	Boys in the Trees (1978)	3:13
17.	"The Stuff That Dreams Are Made Of (Single version)"	Simon	Coming Around Again (1987)	4:27
18.	"Give Me All Night (Single version)"	Simon; McMahon	Coming Around Again (1987)	4:04
19.	"Love of My Life"	Simon	This Is My Life (soundtrack) (1992)	3:35
20.	"Touched by the Sun"	Simon	Letters Never Sent (1994)	5:28
Total length:				78:15

Notes

- ^a signifies a writer by additional lyrics

== Charts and certifications ==
=== Weekly charts ===
Chart (2004)	Peak position
US Billboard 200	22
UK Albums (OCC)	25
Scottish Albums (OCC)	19

=== Certifications ===
Region	Certification	Certified units/sales
United Kingdom (BPI)	Gold	100,000^{^}
United States (RIAA)	Gold	500,000^{^}
^{^} Shipments figures based on certification alone.
