= Film Noir (album) =

Studio album by Carly Simon
- Released: September 16, 1997
- Recorded: 1996–7 New York City
- Studio: Right Track Studios, The Warehouse, Clinton Studios and National Edison Studios (New York City, New York); Snowbound Sound (Pawling, New York); Capitol Studios (Hollywood, California)
- Genre: Standards
- Length: 42:26
- Label: Arista
- Producer: Carly Simon; Jimmy Webb; Arif Mardin

Carly Simon chronology
Clouds in My Coffee (1995)	Film Noir (1997)	The Very Best of Carly Simon: Nobody Does It Better (1998)

Film Noir is the 17th studio album by American singer-songwriter Carly Simon, released by Arista Records, on September 16, 1997.

It is Simon's third album devoted to standards, following Torch (1981) and My Romance (1990). Jimmy Webb co-produced the album and contributed his vocals, orchestration and piano skills to the project which was filmed for an AMC documentary entitled Songs in Shadow: The Making of Carly Simon's Film Noir (which premiered in September 1997). He also co-wrote the title song "Film Noir" with Simon. John Travolta duets with Simon on the song "Two Sleepy People". Film director Martin Scorsese provided liner notes in the fold out booklet. The album was nominated for the Grammy Award for Best Traditional Pop Vocal Performance in 1998.

== Promotion and reception ==
Professional ratings
Review scores
Source	Rating
AllMusic	3/5 stars
Uncut	3/5 stars

Songs in Shadow: The Making of Carly Simon's Film Noir aired as a special presentation on AMC. This documentary also features footage of Jimmy Webb, Arif Mardin and Van Dyke Parks in the studio recording the album with Simon. Simon made and released a music video for "Ev'ry Time We Say Goodbye". She also performed the song on The Tonight Show with Jay Leno and The Late Show with David Letterman. In addition to appearances on The View and CBS This Morning, she performed "Spring Will Be a Little Late This Year" with Jimmy Webb on The Rosie O'Donnell Show.

AllMusic rated the album 3 out of 5 stars and wrote "Using smoky saloon songs like "Ev'ry Time We Say Goodbye" as a blueprint, Simon and producer Jimmy Webb create a seductive, intimate atmosphere."

== Awards ==
Year	Award	Category	Work	Recipient	Result	Ref.
1998	Grammy Awards	Best Traditional Pop Vocal Performance	Film Noir	Carly Simon	Nominated	
1998	Grammy Awards	Best Arrangement, Instrumental and Vocals	"Laura"	Arif Mardin	Nominated	

== Track listing ==
Credits adapted from the album's liner notes.

No.	Title	Writer(s)	Length
1.	"You Won't Forget Me"	Kermi Goel; F. Speilman	2:52
2.	"Ev'ry Time We Say Goodbye"	Cole Porter	4:33
3.	"Lili Marlene"	M. David; Norbert Schultze; H. Leip	3:41
4.	"Last Night When We Were Young"	Edgar Yip Harburg; Harold Arlen	4:42
5.	"Spring Will Be a Little Late This Year"	Frank Loesser	3:34
6.	"Film Noir"	Jimmy Webb; Carly Simon	3:35
7.	"Laura"	Johnny Mercer; David Raksin	4:44
8.	"I'm a Fool to Want You"	Frank Sinatra; Joel Herron; John Wolf	3:32
9.	"Fools Coda"	Torrie Zito	1:13
10.	"Two Sleepy People"	Frank Loesser; Hoagy Carmichael	3:37
11.	"Don't Smoke in Bed"	Willard Robison	2:54
12.	"Somewhere in the Night"	Milton Raskin; Billy May	3:29
Total length:			42:26

== Personnel ==
=== Musicians ===
- Carly Simon – vocals
- Teese Gohl – keyboards (1, 2, 4, 6–8, 11, 12)
- Michael Kosarin – acoustic piano (1, 10, 11)
- Jimmy Webb – acoustic piano (2, 3, 5, 6, 8, 12), organ solo (2)
- Dominic Cortese – accordion (3)
- Russ Kassoff – acoustic piano (4, 7, 12)
- Peter Calo – guitars (1, 2, 4, 7, 11, 12), acoustic guitar (6)
- Jeff Pevar – mandolin (3), guitars (5), electric guitar (6)
- David Finck – acoustic bass (1, 2, 4, 7, 11, 12)
- Zev Katz – electric bass (6)
- Billy Ward – drums (1, 2, 4, 7)
- Shawn Pelton – drums (6)
- Richard Locker – cello solo (6)
- Elena Barere – concertmaster (1, 4, 6, 8, 9, 11, 12)
- Barry Finclair – concertmaster (2, 7)

Background and Guest vocalists

- Carly Simon – backing vocals (2–4, 6)
- Ben Taylor – backing vocals (2, 4, 6)
- Jill Dell'Abate – backing vocals (3)
- Mindy Jostyn – backing vocals (3)
- Jimmy Webb – vocals (5)
- John Travolta – vocals (10)
- Al Dana – backing vocals (10)
- Kevin DiSimone – backing vocals (10)
- Kevin Osborne – backing vocals (10)
- Lenny Roberts – backing vocals (10)
- Darryl Tookes – backing vocals (10)

Music arrangements

- Van Dyke Parks – arrangements and conductor (1, 2, 11)
- Torrie Zito – arrangements and conductor (4, 9), arrangements (8)
- Jimmy Webb – arrangements and conductor (6, 12), conductor (8)
- Arif Mardin – arrangements and conductor (7)
- Michael Kosarin – piano arrangements (10)
- Dick Berkhe – BGV arrangements (10)

=== Production ===
- Carly Simon – producer (1–6, 8–12)
- Jimmy Webb – producer (1–6, 8–12)
- Arif Mardin – producer (7)
- Frank Filipetti – engineer, mixing
- Billy Eric – additional engineer
- Brian Faehndrich – additional engineer
- Roy Hendrickson – additional engineer
- Michael O'Reilly – additional engineer
- Al Schmitt – additional engineer
- Craig Boyce – assistant engineer, mix assistant
- Peter Doell – assistant engineer
- Joe Lizzi – assistant engineer
- Jim Murray – assistant engineer
- Yvonne Yedibalian – assistant engineer
- Ted Jensen – mastering at Sterling Sound (New York, NY)
- Jill Dell'Abate – production manager, music contractor
- Nancy Roof – additional production coordinator
- Clarissa Walker – personal assistant
- Mark Burdett – art direction
- Rita Karidis – design
- Marlo Viscel – design
- Greg Gorman – photography
- Martin Scorsese – liner notes
- Bill Zimmerman – research
- Evan Morris, Donald Oliver and Chelsea Music Service – music preparation
- Howard Siegel – legal representation for Carly Simon
- Robin Siegel – management for Jimmy Webb

== Charts ==
Chart (1997)	Peak position
US Billboard 200	84
