= The Very Best of Carly Simon: Nobody Does It Better =

Greatest hits album by Carly Simon
- Released: December 15, 1998
- Genre: Pop, rock
- Length: 77:30
- Label: Global/Warner Bros.

Carly Simon chronology
Film Noir (1997)	The Very Best of Carly Simon: Nobody Does It Better (1998)	The Bedroom Tapes (2000)

The Very Best of Carly Simon: Nobody Does It Better is the third greatest hits album by American singer-songwriter Carly Simon, released on December 15, 1998.

Originally released in the UK, this was Simon's first single-disc, cross label compilation. It includes her hits from the Elektra years (1971–1979) and the Arista years (1986–2000). The album also includes the 1982 single "Why", a top 10 hit in the UK, from the Soup For One soundtrack.

== Reception ==
Professional ratings
Review scores
Source	Rating
AllMusic	4.5/5 stars

AllMusic rated the collection 41/2-stars-out-of-5, and wrote while "some consumers may be a little ticked at the non-chronological sequencing, this collection does have one big, big virtue -- it has Carly Simon's big hits, not just from the '70s, but such latter-day comebacks as "Coming Around Again" and "Let the River Run", on one disc. That makes it worth import prices for non-U.K. residents looking for a thorough collection."

== Track listing ==
Credits adapted from the album's liner notes.

No.	Title	Writer(s)	Original album	Length
1.	"You're So Vain"	Carly Simon	No Secrets (1972)	4:18
2.	"Nobody Does It Better"	Carole Bayer Sager; Marvin Hamlisch	The Spy Who Loved Me (soundtrack) (1977)	3:42
3.	"Why"	Bernard Edwards; Nile Rodgers	Soup for One (soundtrack) (1982)	4:06
4.	"Coming Around Again"	Simon	Coming Around Again (1987)	3:39
5.	"The Right Thing to Do"	Simon	No Secrets (1972)	2:58
6.	"We Have No Secrets"	Simon	No Secrets (1972)	3:57
7.	"You Belong to Me"	Simon; Michael McDonald	Boys in the Trees (1978)	3:49
8.	"That's the Way I've Always Heard It Should Be"	Simon; Jacob Brackman	Carly Simon (1971)	4:17
9.	"Mockingbird (with James Taylor)"	Inez Foxx; Charlie Foxx; Taylor^{[a]}	Hotcakes (1974)	4:11
10.	"Haven't Got Time for the Pain"	Simon; Brackman	Hotcakes (1974)	3:55
11.	"Anticipation"	Simon	Anticipation (1971)	3:21
12.	"Legend in Your Own Time"	Simon	Anticipation (1971)	3:45
13.	"The Stuff That Dreams Are Made Of"	Simon	Coming Around Again (1987)	4:56
14.	"All I Want Is You"	Simon; Brackman; Andy Goldmark	Coming Around Again (1987)	3:58
15.	"Give Me All Night"	Simon; Gerard McMahon	Coming Around Again (1987)	4:23
16.	"Like a River"	Simon	Letters Never Sent (1994)	4:45
17.	"Better Not Tell Her"	Simon	Have You Seen Me Lately (1990)	5:21
18.	"Angel from Montgomery"	John Prine	Clouds in My Coffee (1995)	4:29
19.	"Let the River Run"	Simon	Working Girl (soundtrack) (1989)	3:40
Total length:				77:30

Notes

- ^a signifies a writer by additional lyrics

== Credits ==
- Jacob Brackman – composer
- Bernard Edwards – composer
- Inez and Charlie Foxx – composer
- Andy Goldmark – composer
- Marvin Hamlisch – composer
- Russ Kunkel – producer
- George Massenburg – producer
- Michael McDonald – composer
- Gerard McMahon – composer
- Bill Payne – producer
- John Prine – composer
- Nile Rodgers – composer
- Carole Bayer Sager – composer
- Paul Samwell-Smith – producer
- Carly Simon – composer, primary artist, vocals
- James Taylor – composer, primary artist, vocals

== Charts ==
=== Weekly charts ===
Chart (1999)	Peak position
UK Albums (OCC)	22
Scottish Albums (OCC)	32
European Albums (Music & Media)	86
