= Haven't Got Time for the Pain =

Single by Carly Simon

from the album Hotcakes
- B-side: "Mind on My Man"
- Released: April 1974
- Recorded: late 1973
- Studio: The Hit Factory, New York City
- Genre: Soft rock; pop
- Length: 3:50
- Label: Elektra
- Songwriters: Carly Simon; Jacob Brackman
- Producer: Richard Perry

Carly Simon singles chronology
"Mockingbird" (1974)	"Haven't Got Time for the Pain" (1974)	"Attitude Dancing" (1975)

"Haven't Got Time for the Pain" is a song written by Carly Simon and Jacob Brackman that was first released on Simon's 1974 album Hotcakes as its closing track. It was also released as a single, reaching No. 14 on the Billboard Hot 100 and No. 2 on the Billboard Adult Contemporary chart.

== Lyrics and music ==
The song, composed in the key of G major, contains a ii-V-I progression common in R&B and jazz. AllMusic critic Joe Viglione described "Haven't Got Time for the Pain" as sounding like a sequel to "The Right Thing to Do," from Simon's previous album No Secrets from 1972. The lyrics state that after a new, wonderful person has entered the singer's life, she no longer has time or reason for suffering over past lovers lost. According to author Sheila Weller, the lyrics reflect Simon's life at the time – she has no more use for "self-obsession" or "existential angst." Viglione describes Simon's vocals as being "perfectly in tune," and Weller describes the passion expressed by her "bleating voice" as undercutting the "vow of emotional peace" in the lyrics, which according to Weller "gives the song its edge." Instrumentation includes piano, played by Simon herself, drums and string instruments, plus acoustic guitar played by Simon's then-husband James Taylor. Viglione praises producer Richard Perry for "very cleverly accentuating Simon's emotions" by using classical instruments in the song.

Simon was pregnant with her first child, Sally, during the recording sessions. The pregnancy prevented her from singing the highest notes of "Haven't Got Time for the Pain", so these notes were covered by backing singer Tasha Thomas for the album. Meanwhile, after Sally’s birth in early 1974, Simon re-recorded these notes, singing them herself for the 7-inch single release. The string-and-percussion outro at the end of the song was composed by cellist Paul Buckmaster and drummer Ralph MacDonald. Weller describes the string interlude as "operatic."

== Reception ==
Rolling Stone critic Jon Landau described "Haven't Got Time for the Pain" as Simon's "best single to date"; this following such hit singles as "Anticipation" and "You're So Vain." Billboard described it as a "pretty ballad" that is somewhat similar to some of her earlier songs and praised Simon's vocal performance. Cash Box said that "Carly's vocals are as bright and sensitive as ever and work this ballad perfectly" and that "Richard Perry’s usual incredible production touch adds the necessary depth and makes this one of Carly’s most exciting single outings to date." Record World called it "a high-flyin' solo ballad, kept aloft by winds of melodic, orchestral and tempo changes." Viglione describes it as "one of the classiest as well as one of the simplest" of the many successful singles released by female vocalists in 1974. Music critic Robert Christgau called "Haven't Got Time for the Pain" "the most insidious let's-write-God-a-love-song to date". Author Bruce Pollock described it as a "yuppie credo."

"Haven't Got Time for the Pain" has been included on several Carly Simon compilation albums, including The Best of Carly Simon (1975), the three-disc box set Clouds in My Coffee (1995), The Very Best of Carly Simon: Nobody Does It Better (1998), the two-disc Anthology (2002), Reflections: Carly Simon's Greatest Hits (2004) and the three-disc Carly Simon Collector's Edition (2009). It was also included on Simon's live album Live at Grand Central (2023).

== In popular culture ==
The song was heard in commercials for the ibuprofen brand Medipren in the late 1980s.

== Personnel ==
- Carly Simon – lead vocals, piano
- James Taylor – acoustic lead guitar
- Jimmy Ryan – acoustic rhythm guitar
- Klaus Voormann – bass guitar
- Jim Keltner – drums
- Lani Groves – backing vocals
- Carl Hall – backing vocals
- Tasha Thomas – backing vocals
- Ralph MacDonald – percussion
- Paul Buckmaster – string and woodwind arrangements, conductor
- Richard Perry – producer

== Track listing ==
7" single

- "Haven't Got Time For The Pain" – 3:50
- "Mind On My Man" – 2:57

== Charts ==
=== Weekly charts ===
Chart (1974)	Peak position
Australia (ARIA Charts)	74
Canada (RPM) Top Singles	5
Canada (RPM) Adult Contemporary	1
US Billboard Pop Singles (Hot 100)	14
US Billboard Adult Contemporary	2
US Cashbox Top 100	7
Quebec (ADISQ)	20

=== Year-end charts ===
Chart (1974)	Rank
Canada	107
US (Joel Whitburn's Pop Annual)	131
