= Comes in Waves =

Studio album by Carly Simon
- Released: August 14, 2026
- Recorded: Summer 1971, 1983-1985, 2003-2004, 2023-2026
- Studios: Morgan Studios, London, England and Carly Simon’s home studio, Martha’s Vineyard
- Genre: Pop
- Length: 43:05
- Label: Iris
- Producers: Joe Deleault; Frank Filipetti; Peter Fish; Mike Mainieri; Paul Samwell-Smith; Carly Simon; David Spencer; Ben Taylor; Ernest Thompson

Carly Simon chronology
These Are the Good Old Days: The Carly Simon and Jac Holzman Story (2023)	Comes in Waves (2026)

Singles from Comes in Waves
- 1. "Howl" Released: June 11, 2026; 2. "Peaches" Released: July 31, 2026

Comes in Waves is the 24th studio album by the American singer-songwriter Carly Simon, released on August 14, 2026. It marks her first full studio album of original content in 18 years, since 2008's This Kind of Love.

== Promotion ==
The album's lead single, "Howl", was released on June 11, 2026, simultaneously with the album's announcement. A lyric video coincided with the song's release.

The second single, "Peaches", was released on July 31, 2026. A lyric video coincided with the song's release.

== Reception ==
Professional ratings
Aggregate scores
Source	Rating
Metacritic	74/100
Review scores
Source	Rating
The Daily Telegraph	4/5 stars
Uncut	4/5 stars

On review aggregator Metacritic, Comes in Waves received a score of 74 out of 100 based on four reviews, indicating "generally favorable reviews".

The Daily Telegraph stated "The soft-rock sweetheart's voice is as ballsy as ever, sharing wisdom about moving on in her first album in 18 years... this isn't an album that will bring Simon any new fans. But those of us who’ve always loved the gawky stammerer with the overbite who grew into the hot rock chick are left with a feeling we've had another flip through the photo album and deepened reflections on the same moments." Far Out called it "a 'welcome return' with 'warmth and stirring songcraft,' highlighting Mother of Pearl as a standout love letter to her daughter Sally, and Slowly as a meditative, string-laden highlight." USA Today described the album as a "moving, late-career triumph."

== Track listing ==
Comes in Waves track listing
No.	Title	Writer(s)	Producer(s)	Length
1.	"Howl"	Carly Simon; David Spencer	Spencer; Larry Ciancia^{[a]}; Teese Gohl^{[a]}; Paul Samwell-Smith^{[a]}	3:05
2.	"Maybe I Never Loved You"	Simon	Mike Mainieri; Ciancia^{[a]}; Gohl^{[a]}; Samwell-Smith^{[a]}; Ben Taylor^{[b]}	2:33
3.	"Peaches"	Simon	Simon; Ciancia^{[a]}; Gohl^{[a]}; Samwell-Smith^{[a]}	3:39
4.	"Love Has No Ending"	Simon; W. H. Auden	Peter Fish; Taylor; Ciancia^{[a]}; Gohl^{[a]}; Samwell-Smith^{[a]}	5:23
5.	"Mother of Pearl"	Simon	Frank Filipetti; Ciancia^{[a]}; Gohl^{[a]}; Samwell-Smith^{[a]}	3:52
6.	"Slowly" (featuring Andreas Vollenweider)	Simon; Teese Gohl; Jim Parr; Andreas Vollenweider	Simon; Ciancia^{[a]}; Gohl^{[a]}; Samwell-Smith^{[a]}	3:27
7.	"Four in the Morning"	Simon; Judy Belushi	Taylor; Ciancia^{[a]}; Gohl^{[a]}; Samwell-Smith^{[a]}	3:05
8.	"The More I Look for You"	Simon	Simon; Ciancia^{[a]}; Gohl^{[a]}; Samwell-Smith^{[a]}	2:48
9.	"Love the Way I Do"	Simon; Jacob Brackman; Natasha Bedingfield; Gohl; David Saw; Taylor	Filipetti; Ciancia^{[a]}; Gohl^{[a]}; Samwell-Smith^{[a]}	3:59
10.	"The Father Daughter Dance"	Simon; Joe Deleault; Ernest Thompson	Deleault; Thompson	3:13
11.	"Share the End" (2025 remaster)	Simon; Brackman	Samwell-Smith; Ciancia^{[a]}; Taylor^{[a]}	3:56
12.	"Do It Anyway"	Simon	Simon	4:05
Total length:				43:05

=== Notes ===
- ^{^[a]} indiciates an additional producer
- ^{^[b]} indicates an assistant producer

== Personnel ==
Credits are adapted from Tidal.

- Carly Simon – lead vocals (all tracks), piano (tracks 3, 11, 12), acoustic guitar (4), guitar (5)
- Frank Filipetti – mixing (all tracks); claves (9)
- Brad Smalling – mastering
- Athena Wilkinson – engineering assistance
- Larry Ciancia – drums (1, 4, 6)
- Ben Taylor – guitar (1, 5), piano (3), lead vocals (4), strings (7), background vocals (9)
- David Spencer – background vocals (1, 6), acoustic guitar (1)
- Patrick Warren – strings (1); arrangement, piano (8)
- Chris Stills – background vocals (1)
- Warren Bernhardt – piano (2)
- Mike Mainieri – strings (2)
- Sophie Hiller – background vocals (4, 9)
- Peter Calo – mandolin (4), guitar (9)
- Peter Fish – harmonica (4)
- Teese Gohl – piano (5, 9), background vocals (6)
- John Forté – percussion (5, 9)
- Brad Tucker – bass guitar (5)
- David Saw – guitar (5)
- Jim Parr – background vocals (6)
- Andreas Vollenweider – harp (6)
- Judy Belushi – lead vocals (7)
- Rob Mathes – arrangement (8)
- Sally Taylor – background vocals (9)
- Rick Marotta – drums (9)
- Natasha Bedingfield – lead vocals (9)
- Randy Roos – acoustic guitar (10)
- Brendan Dowd – bass guitar (10)
- Joe Deleaut – piano (10)
- John Ryan – acoustic bass guitar (11)
- Del Newman – arrangement, drums (11)
- Peter-John Vettese – bass guitar (11)
- Andy Newmark – drums (11)
- Jim Ryan – guitar (11)
- Paul Glanz – piano (11)
- Jacob Brackman – background vocals (12)
- Mindy Jostyn – background vocals (12)
- Sid McGinnis – background vocals (12)
- Will Lee – background vocals (12)

== Charts ==
Chart performance for Comes in Waves
Chart (2026)	Peak position
Scottish Albums (Official Charts)	48
UK Albums Sales (Official Charts)	35
UK Independent Albums (Official Charts)	11
