= My Romance (Carly Simon album) =

Studio album by Carly Simon
- Released: March 13, 1990
- Recorded: September 1989
- Studios: Power Station, New York City
- Genre: Standards
- Length: 37:40
- Label: Arista
- Producers: Frank Filipetti; Marty Paich

Carly Simon chronology
Working Girl (Original Soundtrack Album) (1989)	My Romance (1990)	Have You Seen Me Lately (1990)

My Romance is the 14th studio album by American singer-songwriter Carly Simon, released by Arista Records, on March 13, 1990.

The album is Simon's second devoted to standards, following Torch from nine years earlier. It peaked at No. 46 on the Billboard 200, and remained on the chart for 17 weeks. Simon's version of "In the Wee Small Hours of the Morning" from this album was featured in the 1993 Nora Ephron film Sleepless in Seattle, and was included on the film's soundtrack album.

== Reception ==
Professional ratings
Review scores
Source	Rating
AllMusic	3/5 stars

In a retrospective review for AllMusic, William Ruhlmann rated the album 3-out-of-5-stars, and wrote: "On her second album of pop standards, Carly Simon was a little less interested in the lovelorn songs that had filled 1981's Torch. For the most part, the theme was romantic, with classics like "My Funny Valentine" and "Bewitched" handled in Simon's sexy, plaintive style."

== Track listing ==
Credits adapted from the album's liner notes.

No.	Title	Writer(s)	Length
1.	"My Romance"	Richard Rodgers; Lorenz Hart	2:36
2.	"By Myself/I See Your Face Before Me"	Howard Dietz; Arthur Schwartz	3:14
3.	"When Your Lover Has Gone"	Einar A. Swan	4:08
4.	"In the Wee Small Hours of the Morning"	Bob Hilliard; David Mann	3:17
5.	"My Funny Valentine"	Rodgers; Hart	3:24
6.	"Something Wonderful"	Rodgers; Oscar Hammerstein II	2:17
7.	"Little Girl Blue"	Rodgers; Hart	3:44
8.	"He Was Too Good to Me"	Rodgers; Hart	2:41
9.	"What Has She Got"	Carly Simon; Michael Kosarin; Jacob Brackman	2:44
10.	"Bewitched"	Rodgers; Hart	4:05
11.	"Danny Boy"	Frederic Weatherly; Traditional	3:24
12.	"Time After Time"	Jule Styne; Sammy Cahn	2:06
Total length:			37:40

== Carly in Concert: My Romance ==
Carly in Concert: My Romance (VHS)

Carly in Concert: My Romance is a 1990 concert special for HBO, featuring Simon and guest star Harry Connick, Jr. It was released on VHS and LaserDisc later the same year. Connick, Jr. participates on piano and bass, as well as vocals. The special was directed by Kathy Daugherty and runs 73 minutes.

This was Simon's second concert special for HBO, following Live from Martha's Vineyard from 1987.

=== Track listing ===
- "Little Girl Blue" (Richard Rodgers/Lorenz Hart)
- "By Myself / I See Your Face Before Me" (Howard Dietz/Arthur Schwartz)
- "Bewitched" (Rodgers/Hart)
- "Something Wonderful" (Rodgers/Oscar Hammerstein II)
- "In the Wee Small Hours of the Morning" (Bob Hilliard/David Mann)
- "New Kind of Love"
- "Stomping at the Savoy"
- "I'm Falling"
- "I Don't Know Why (I Just Do)" (Fred E. Ahlert/Roy Turk)
- "I Have Dreamed" (Rodgers/Hammerstein)
- "We Have No Secrets" (Carly Simon)
- "When Your Lover Has Gone" (Einar Aaron Swan)
- "He Was Too Good to Me"
- "What Has She Got" (Simon/Michael Kosarin/Jacob Brackman)
- "Time After Time" (Jule Styne/Sammy Cahn)
- "My Romance" (Rodgers/Hart)

== Personnel ==
=== Musicians ===
- Carly Simon – vocals
- Michael Kosarin – acoustic piano, arrangements
- Jimmy Ryan – guitars
- Jay Leonhart – acoustic bass
- Wayne Pedzwater – bass guitar
- Steve Gadd – drums
- Gordon Gottlieb – percussion
- Michael Brecker – Steinerphone solo on "When Your Lover Has Gone", saxophone solo on "Bewitched"
- Marvin Stamm – trumpet solo on "In The Wee Small Hours of the Morning"
- David Nadien – violin solo on "Something Wonderful"

Orchestra

- Marty Paich – orchestra arrangements and conductor
- Emile Charlap – orchestra contractor

Horn and Woodwind section

- Stephen Taylor – oboe
- John Clark, Bill Hamilton Will Parker and Jerry Peel – horns
- Joseph Anderer – French horn

String section

- David Nadien – concertmaster
- Jesse Levy, Richard Locker, Charles McCracken, Mark Shuman and Nathan Stutch – cello
- John Beal – double bass
- Margaret Ross – harp
- Lamar Alsop, Harold Coletta, Monica Gerard, Olivia Koppell, Jesse Levine and Emanuel Vardi – viola
- Marin Alsop, Elena Barare, Heidi Iden Carney, Rick Dolan, Arnold Eidus, Narciso Figueroa, Barry Finclair, Regis Iandiorio, Jean Ingraham, Nancy McAlhany, Jan Mullen, Paul Peabody, John Pintavalle, Joel Pitchon, Matthew Raimondi, Lenard Rivlin, Mary Rowell, Richard Sortomme and Ruth Waterman – violin

=== Production ===
- Frank Filipetti – producer, recording, mixing
- Marty Paich – producer
- Michael Kosarin – associate producer
- Matthew Lamonica – second engineer
- Ted Jensen – mastering at Sterling Sound (New York City, New York)
- Carolyn Quan – design
- Bob Gothard – photography
- Kathy Schinhofen – hand lettering
- Champion Entertainment Organization, Inc. – management

== Charts ==
Chart (1990)	Peak position
US Billboard 200	46
US Cash Box Top 200 Albums	43
