= Spy (Carly Simon album) =

Studio album by Carly Simon
- Released: June 1979
- Recorded: December 1978 – April 1979
- Studio: Atlantic (New York City)
- Genres: Rock; pop; disco
- Length: 40:37
- Label: Elektra
- Producer: Arif Mardin

Carly Simon chronology
Boys in the Trees (1978)	Spy (1979)	Come Upstairs (1980)

Singles from Boys in the Trees
- 1. "Vengeance" Released: 1979; 2. "Spy" Released: 1979

Spy is the eighth studio album by American singer-songwriter Carly Simon, released by Elektra Records in June 1979.

The title of the album is a tribute to Anaïs Nin, whose quote "I am an international spy in the house of love", is written across the top on the inside jacket. Simon dedicated the album to producer Arif Mardin, in which she wrote in the liner notes, "Dedicated to Arif who is himself fantastic." It is also Simon's last album for Elektra Records, she signed with Warner Bros. Records and released Come Upstairs the following year.

== Reception ==
Professional ratings
Review scores
Source	Rating
AllMusic	3/5 stars
Christgau's Record Guide	B−

Debra Rae Cohen, writing in Rolling Stone, stated: "Here, Simon’s rough, bold voice — powerful and affecting as ever — seizes center stage with husky promise and, like a dormitory storyteller after lights out, threatens revelations. But even discounting the mediating layers of studio polish, she winds up sounding strangely distanced from her material." She also singled out the track "We're So Close", calling it "the record’s gem".

Although Spy did not yield any major hit singles, "Vengeance" (which features actor Tim Curry on backing vocals) earned Simon a Grammy Award nomination for Best Rock Vocal Performance, Female in early 1980, the first year to feature this new category. Cash Box said that it has "an urban rock feeling, with ominous guitar chording and touches of syndrums," saying that "Simon's vocals are...sharp and bold" but "less restrained than usual." The song peaked at No. 48 on the Billboard Pop singles chart, and No. 52 on the Cash Box top singles chart. She included the track on her two-disc career compilation set Anthology (2002), as well as the three-disc special edition compilation Carly Simon Collector's Edition (2009). The song "Spy" was released as the second single from the album, and it reached No. 34 on the Billboard Adult Contemporary.

The album also features the songs "Never Been Gone" and "We're So Close", which have become fan favorites and stand among Simon's personal favorites of her own songs. Simon later called "We're So Close" "the saddest song I've ever written. It was about how close you can pretend to be when you know it's all coming undone. In 2009, Simon released Never Been Gone; an album which includes a newly recorded version of the song, along with some of her other greatest hits.

== Music videos ==
Simon made a music video for the track "Vengeance", and she became the second female solo artist to be featured on MTV's first day of the air (Pat Benatar was the first female solo artist to appear on MTV, with "You Better Run", and Juice Newton was the third, with "Angel of the Morning"). MTV later used a clip from the video in a commercial to entice viewers to get stereo sound on their television sets. The promotional clip was also chosen by Pioneer Electronics to be part of their first demo disc for its then-new LaserDisc player.

Simon also made music videos for the tracks "We're So Close" and "Never Been Gone", with both also receiving rotation on MTV.

== Awards ==
Year	Award	Category	Work	Result	Ref.
1980	Grammy Awards	Best Rock Vocal Performance, Female	"Vengeance"	Nominated	

== Track listing ==
Credits adapted from the album's liner notes.

Side one
No.	Title	Writer(s)	Length
1.	"Vengeance"	Carly Simon	4:14
2.	"Just Like You Do"	Simon	4:14
3.	"We're So Close"	Simon	5:10
4.	"Coming to Get You"	Simon	2:49
5.	"Never Been Gone"	Simon; Jacob Brackman	3:36

Side two
No.	Title	Writer(s)	Length
1.	"Pure Sin"	Simon; Frank Carillo	3:56
2.	"Love You By Heart"	Simon; Brackman; Libby Titus	3:55
3.	"Spy"	Simon; James Taylor; Arif Mardin	4:14
4.	"Memorial Day"	Simon	8:29
Total length:			40:37

== Personnel ==
=== Musicians ===
- Carly Simon – lead and backing vocals, acoustic piano (3, 9)
- Ian McLagan – acoustic piano (1)
- Don Grolnick – acoustic piano (1, 6), clavinet (1)
- Warren Bernhardt – keyboards (1), acoustic piano (2, 4, 5, 9), electric piano (3, 6–9)
- Richard Tee – clavinet (1), electric piano (2, 5)
- Ken Bichel – Polymoog (2, 3), synthesizers (4)
- Cliff Carter – synthesizers (6)
- Billy Mernit – acoustic piano (8)
- Joe Caro – electric guitar (1, 8), guitar (6, 9), acoustic guitar (4)
- John Hall – electric guitar (1), electric guitar solo (1)
- David Spinozza – electric guitar (1, 2, 4, 7, 8), acoustic guitar (2, 3, 7), electric guitar solo (4), guitar (6, 9)
- Frank Carillo – guitar (6)
- Tony Levin – bass guitar (1, 6, 7)
- Will Lee – bass guitar (2–4, 8, 9)
- Steve Gadd – drums (1–4, 6, 8, 9)
- Rick Marotta – drums (1, 2, 8)
- Errol "Crusher" Bennett – percussion (3, 7), congas (7)
- Raphael Cruz – cowbell (6), congas (7), percussion (7, 8)
- Mike Mainieri – vibraphone (9)
- David Sanborn – alto saxophone (1–3, 9)
- Michael Brecker – tenor saxophone (1, 6), tenor sax solo (6)
- Peter Ballin – alto saxophone (6)
- Lew Del Gatto – baritone saxophone (6)
- Hubert Laws – flute (8)
- Tom Malone – trombone (6)
- Randy Brecker – trumpet (1, 6)
- Arif Mardin – horn and string arrangements, choir arrangement (5)
- Gene Orloff – concertmaster
- Tim Curry – backing vocals (1, 6)
- Ullanda McCullough – backing vocals (2)
- James Taylor – backing vocals (2, 5, 7, 8)
- Lucy Simon – backing vocals (5)
- Jonathan Abramowitz, Lamar Alsop, Julien Barber, Phil Bodner, James Buffington, Frederick Buldrini, Jean R. Dane, Eddie Daniels, Peter Dimitriades, Lewis Eley, Gerald Tarack, Paul Gershman, Ted Hoyle, Regis Iandiorio, Teddy Israel, Harold Kohon, Jesse Levy, Guy Lumia, Joseph Malin, Richard Maximoff, Kermit Moore, Eugene J. Moye, Gene Orloff, Tony Posk, Alan Shulman and Mitsue Takayama – strings

=== Production ===
- Producer – Arif Mardin
- Recorded and Mixed by Lew Hahn
- Assistant Engineer – Mike O'Malley
- Mastering – George Piros
- Art Direction and Design – Robert Heimall
- Photography – Pam Frank

== Charts ==
Chart (1979)	Peak position
Australian Albums (Kent Music Report)	33
Canada Top Albums/CDs (RPM)	56
US Billboard 200	45
US Cash Box Top 100 Albums	35
