= Letters Never Sent =

Studio album by Carly Simon
- Released: November 1, 1994
- Recorded: 1994
- Studios: Right Track Recording, The Hit Factory, Edison Studios, Room With a View and Sound On Sound (New York City, New York); Cadiloon Sound (Pawling, New York)
- Genre: Pop
- Length: 52:07
- Label: Arista
- Producers: Frank Filipetti; Carly Simon; Tesse Gohl; Paul Samwell-Smith; Danny Kortchmar

Carly Simon chronology
Romulus Hunt: A Family Opera (1993)	Letters Never Sent (1994)	Clouds in My Coffee (1995)

Letters Never Sent is the 16th studio album by American singer-songwriter Carly Simon, released by Arista Records, on November 1, 1994.

Simon has stated the inspiration for the album came when she found an old box of letters that she'd written, but never mailed. She wrote "Like a River" in honor of her mother, Andrea Simon, and "Touched by the Sun" for her dear friend, Jackie Onassis, both of whom died from cancer in 1994.

The album features backing vocals by Marc Cohn and Simon's son Ben Taylor (who also appears as vocalist on "Time Works on All the Wild Young Men", the bridge song between the fourth and sixth tracks). Andreas Vollenweider plays the harp on the track "Davy".

== Promotion ==
Simon made music videos for the songs "Like a River" and "Touched by the Sun". She performed "Touched by the Sun" on the Late Show with David Letterman on two occasions. Simon also embarked on a co-headlining tour with Hall & Oates in support of the album.

== Reception ==
Professional ratings
Review scores
Source	Rating
AllMusic	3/5 stars
Entertainment Weekly	B+

In their review of "Like A River", Billboard commented that "Simon christens her lovely new Letters Never Sent album with an intelligent and melodically complex tune that swirls with a haunting and philosophical tale of death and change. Simon has not offered a song as moving as this in years, giving her words further weight with music full of seemingly countless shifts that keep the ear alert. It is, by turns, orchestral and poppy, and will bring a smart, emotional vibe to any AC radio station it graces."

Cashbox stated that "Simon’s latest album has the potential to be her most intriguing in years. The voice behind such hits as “You’re So Vain" and “Haven’t Got Time For The Pain" has tapped into the universal trait of wishing to say things never said...Given the personal nature of a project like this, one wishes Simon might’ve cut back on the arrangements a bit, but fans will still be suitably impressed and there is a lot of promise for adult/contemporary success."

Entertainment Weekly graded the album B+, and wrote "Simon dug up her old, unsent letters — to people unnamed, but not necessarily unidentifiable — and set them to music. The results are funky, fascinating, and sumptuous. A daring move that pays off." AllMusic wrote that the album "represents a fresh start" and that "Simon has returned to passion as her main subject matter, confessing, "I can never be in love, I can only be in heat." She gives off that heat in many of the album's songs" and concluded "It's an unusually coquettish performance for a woman of 49, and practically weightless."

== Awards ==
Year	Award	Category	Work/Recipient	Result	Ref.
1995	Boston Music Awards	Outstanding Song/Songwriter	"Like a River"	Won	
1995	Boston Music Awards	Outstanding Female Vocalist	Carly Simon	Won	

== Track listing ==
Credits adapted from the album's liner notes.

No.	Title	Writer(s)	Length
1.	"Intro"	Instrumental	0:18
2.	"Letters Never Sent"	Carly Simon; Jacob Brackman	4:45
3.	"Lost in Your Love"	Simon	4:52
4.	"Like a River"	Simon	6:03
5.	"Time Works on All the Wild Young Men"	Simon; Ben Taylor	0:44
6.	"Touched by the Sun"	Simon	5:28
7.	"Davy"	Simon	3:41
8.	"Halfway 'Round the World"	Simon	4:33
9.	"What About a Holiday"	Simon	0:32
10.	"The Reason"	Simon; Danny Kortchmar	5:29
11.	"Private"	Simon	4:37
12.	"Catch It Like a Fever"	Simon	0:23
13.	"Born To Break My Heart"	Simon	5:00
14.	"I'd Rather It Was You"	Simon	5:42
Total length:			52:07

== Live at Grand Central ==
Live at Grand Central is a 1995 concert special that aired on Lifetime Television. Performed in the middle of New York City's Grand Central Terminal, the surprise concert was a prelude to Simon's first concert tour in 14 years. It was directed by English music video and film director Nigel Dick, and runs 60 minutes. It was released on VHS and LaserDisc later the same year.

For this special, Simon was nominated for two CableACE Award's, winning Best Original Song for "Touched by the Sun".

== Personnel ==
=== Musicians ===
- Carly Simon – vocals (2–4, 6–14), acoustic guitar (3, 6, 7, 11, 14), acoustic piano (4), electric piano (4), drum programming (4, 10, 13), keyboards (10, 13), strings (13)
- Teese Gohl – keyboards (2, 10, 14), string arrangements and conductor (2, 5–14), synthesizers (3, 6, 8, 11), orchestral arrangements (4), acoustic piano (4), strings (13)
- Mick Rossi – acoustic piano (3, 6, 11)
- Carlos Alomar – electric guitar (2), guitars (13)
- Jimmy Ryan – electric guitar (3), dobro (14), hammered dulcimer (14)
- Ben Taylor – acoustic guitar (5)
- Peter Calo – acoustic guitar (6, 8, 11), guitars (13)
- Dirk Ziff – lead guitar (6)
- David A. Stewart – acoustic guitar (8), electric guitar (8)
- Danny Kortchmar – acoustic guitar (10), electric guitar (10), slide guitar (10)
- Doug Wimbish – bass (2, 13)
- T-Bone Wolk – bass (3, 13)
- Pino Palladino – bass (4, 6, 10)
- Gregory Jones – bass (6, 11)
- Sammy Merendino – drums (2, 14)
- Andy Newmark – drums (3)
- Robin Gould – drums (4)
- Rick Marotta – drums (6, 11)
- Walter Keiser – drums (7)
- Paul Samwell-Smith – Grand Cassa bass drum (8), tambourine (8)
- Steve Ferrone – drums (10)
- Jimmy Bralower – additional drum programming (13)
- Andy Snitzer – tenor sax solo (3), tenor saxophone (11)
- Emile Charlap – string contractor (2, 4–14)
- Arif Mardin – arrangements and conductor (3)
- Joe Mardin – arrangements and conductor (3)
- Gene Orloff – string contractor (3)
- Jeffrey Halpern – orchestra conductor (4)
- Andreas Vollenweider – electric harp (7)
- Taj Mahal – harmonica (8)
- Beth Miller – fiddle (8)

Background vocalists

- Jerry Barnes – backing vocals (2)
- Katreese Barnes – backing vocals (2)
- Curtis King – backing vocals (2)
- Dexter Redding – backing vocals (3)
- Otis Redding III – backing vocals (3)
- Luretta Bybee – backing vocals (4)
- Jeff Hariston – backing vocals (4)
- Wendy Hill – backing vocals (4)
- Ben Taylor – vocals (5, 8), backing vocals (6)
- Marc Cohn – backing vocals (6)
- Taj Mahal – vocals (8)
- Julia Simon – backing vocals (10)
- Sally Taylor – backing vocals (10)
- Rosanne Cash – backing vocals (13)

Sailors on "Halfway Around the World"

- Teese Gohl, Gregory Keller, Paul Samwell-Smith and Ben Taylor

=== Production ===
- Frank Filipetti – producer (1, 3–7, 11–14), recording, mixing
- Carly Simon – producer (1, 3–7, 11–14), art direction, front cover collage
- Teese Gohl – producer (2)
- Paul Samwell-Smith – producer (8)
- Danny Kortchmar – producer (10)
- Jay Militscher – second engineer, additional engineer
- Gary Chester – additional engineer
- Jim Caruana – assistant engineer
- Matt Curry – assistant engineer
- Carl Glanville – assistant engineer
- Al Theurer – assistant engineer
- Yvonne Yedibalian – assistant engineer
- Ted Jensen – mastering at Sterling Sound (New York, NY)
- Jill Dell'Abate – production coordinator
- Jim Lebadd – front cover type design
- Susan Mendola – design
- Bob Gothard – photography
- Richard L. Simon – back cover photography
- Amy Finkle – hand tinting
- Tamera Weiss – collage research
- Brian Doyle – direction, representation

== Charts ==
Chart (1994)	Peak position
US Billboard 200	129
