= That's the Way I've Always Heard It Should Be =

- Side A of the US single

Single by Carly Simon

from the album Carly Simon
- B-side: "Alone"
- Released: April 1971
- Recorded: 1970
- Genre: Soft rock
- Length: 4:15
- Label: Elektra
- Songwriters: Carly Simon; Jacob Brackman
- Producer: Eddie Kramer

Carly Simon singles chronology
"That's the Way I've Always Heard It Should Be" (1971)	"Anticipation" (1971)

"That's the Way I've Always Heard It Should Be" is a song performed by Carly Simon, and the lead single as well as the opening track from her self-titled debut album Carly Simon (1971). Her friend and frequent collaborator Jacob Brackman wrote the lyrics and Simon wrote the music. The song reached peak positions of No. 10 on the Billboard Hot 100 chart and No. 6 on the Billboard Adult Contemporary chart. The song also earned Simon a nomination for Best Female Pop Vocal Performance at the 14th Annual Grammy Awards in 1972, where she also won Best New Artist.

== Background ==
"...then I did [the music for] a television show for NBC called Who Killed Lake Erie, and for that I wrote the melody that turned out to be 'That’s The Way I’ve Always Heard It Should Be'."

It is an art song with a semiclassical melody in the style of Gabriel Fauré. Elektra staffers were worried that the song was too emotionally complex to be released as Simon's first single, with subject matter that includes "the parents' bad marriage; the friends' unhappy lives; the boyfriend's enthusiasm for marriage but controlling nature; the woman's initial resistance and ultimate capitulation."

Simon was quoted as saying, "When I first wrote it I thought it was an unusual thing for people to break up, and now all my friends are divorced."

== Recognition ==
The success of the song propelled Simon into the limelight, and it has been included on several compilations of her work, including The Best of Carly Simon (1975), Clouds in My Coffee (1995), The Very Best of Carly Simon: Nobody Does It Better (1999), Anthology (2002), and Reflections: Carly Simon's Greatest Hits (2004), Carly Simon Collector's Edition (2009), and Songs from the Trees (A Musical Memoir Collection) (2015).

In July 1971, the single reached No. 1 in Boston (WRKO), Burlington, Vermont (WDOT), New Haven (WNHC) and Rochester, New York (WSAY).

No music video existed for this song, although a filmed performance was produced for an episode of the early 1970s PBS series The Great American Dream Machine.

In addition, Simon's performance of the song in New York City at the 1971 Schaefer Music Festival was filmed for the ABC television special Good Vibrations from Central Park; Simon performed on the 2nd and 3rd of July. ABC broadcast its special on August 19, 1971. In 2009, a video of Simon's performance was posted to the official Carly Simon YouTube channel.

== Track listing ==
7" single

- "That's the Way I've Always Heard It Should Be" – 4:15
- "Alone" – 3:36

== Chart performance ==
=== Weekly charts ===
Chart (1971)	Peak Position
Australia (Kent Music Report)	62
Canada (RPM)	15
US Billboard Pop Singles (Hot 100)	10
US Billboard Adult Contemporary	6
US Cash Box Top 100	9
Quebec (ADISQ)	17

=== Year-end charts ===
Chart (1971)	Rank
US Billboard Hot 100	47
US Cash Box Top 100	82

== Awards ==
Year	Award	Category	Work	Result	Ref.
1972	Grammy Awards	Best Pop Vocal Performance, Female	"That's the Way I've Always Heard It Should Be"	Nominated	
