= Matthias Gohl =

Swiss musical producer

Matthias Gohl is a Swiss musical producer/director/supervisor/composer of film scores and stage productions.

He produced most of Elliot Goldenthal's film scores (starting in 1987 with the score to Pet Sematary) as well others. Two scores that he has produced have won an Oscar: Elliot Goldenthal's Frida and John Corigliano's The Red Violin.

He worked for almost twenty years as musical director for Carly Simon, appearing on albums, tours, soundtracks and on television.

He was nominated for an Emmy in 2005 in the category Outstanding Music Direction for Broadway: The American Musical and for a Grammy in 2008 in the category Best Compilation Soundtrack Album for Motion Picture, Television or Other Visual Media for Across the Universe (shared with T-Bone Burnett and Elliot Goldenthal).

Gohl also used variations of his first name (like Teese or Tisse) for onscreen credits.
