= Torch (Carly Simon album) =

Studio album by Carly Simon
- Released: August 1981
- Studios: Power Station, New York City
- Genre: Traditional pop
- Length: 35:02
- Label: Warner Bros.
- Producer: Mike Mainieri

Carly Simon chronology
Come Upstairs (1980)	Torch (1981)	Hello Big Man (1983)

Singles from Torch
- 1. "Hurt" Released: 1981; 2. "I Get Along Without You Very Well" Released: 1981

Torch is the 10th studio album by American singer-songwriter Carly Simon, released by Warner Bros. Records, in August 1981.

It was Simon's first album devoted to standards, namely torch songs, relating unrequited love or rejection. The album also features one Simon original, "From the Heart". The album was recorded during her marriage breakup to James Taylor, which was announced shortly after the release of the album.

== Background ==
Simon listened to and learned the standards while growing up in her parents' house. While working on her previous album, Come Upstairs, she would jam on older songs between takes along with producer Mike Mainieri and pianist Warren Bernhardt. Her lyrical knowledge of those classic songs surprised Mainieri and Bernhardt, and the experience inspired Simon to make an album containing that type of material.

The fifth track from Torch, the standard "Body and Soul", was previously performed during Simon's tour to support Come Upstairs.

== Reception ==
Professional ratings
Review scores
Source	Rating
AllMusic	3/5 stars
Rolling Stone	4/5 stars

Writing in Rolling Stone, Stephen Holden called the album "a gorgeous throwback", stating Simon's "magnificent alto, with its rough-and-tumble lows and wistful highs, has never sounded better." He singled out the track "Not a Day Goes By" as "Torch's moment of truth", a "big, direct ballad", and "Simon's vocal makes you feel each stab of pain." He concluded "though Torch may be too sophisticated to storm the charts, it's nevertheless a superb example of modern mood music, performed with grace, gusto, sensuality, and intelligence."

In a retrospective review from AllMusic, William Ruhlmann similarly singled out the track "Not a Day Goes By", stating that Simon delivers it "with heartbreaking conviction." Simon later included the track on her two-disc career spanning collection Anthology (2002).

"Hurt" was released as the albums lead single; it just missed the Billboard Hot 100, peaking at No. 106 on the Bubbling Under Hot 100 Singles chart.

"From the Heart" was included on Simon's 2015 career retrospective Songs from the Trees (A Musical Memoir Collection).

== Cover artwork ==
The man whose arm Simon is tugging on the cover is American actor Al Corley, known for playing Steven Carrington on the 1980s soap opera Dynasty. The photographer was Lynn Goldsmith.

== Track listing ==
Credits adapted from the album's liner notes.

Side one
No.	Title	Writer(s)	Length
1.	"Blue of Blue"	Nicholas Holmes; Carly Simon^{[a]}	3:38
2.	"I'll Be Around"	Alec Wilder	2:30
3.	"I Got It Bad and That Ain't Good"	Duke Ellington; P.F. Webster	3:46
4.	"I Get Along Without You Very Well"	Hoagy Carmichael	3:23
5.	"Body and Soul"	Edward Heyman; Robert Sour; Frank Eyton; Johnny Green	4:12

Side two
No.	Title	Writer(s)	Length
1.	"Hurt"	Jimmie Crane; Al Jacobs	3:21
2.	"From the Heart"	Simon	2:47
3.	"Spring Is Here"	Richard Rodgers; Lorenz Hart	3:02
4.	"Pretty Strange"	Jon Hendricks; Randy Weston	2:59
5.	"What Shall We Do with the Child"	Holmes; Kate Horsey; Simon^{[a]}	2:44
6.	"Not a Day Goes By (from the Broadway show Merrily We Roll Along)"	Stephen Sondheim	2:40
Total length:			35:02

Notes

- ^a signifies a writer by additional lyrics

== Personnel ==
=== Musicians ===
- Carly Simon – vocals
- Warren Bernhardt – acoustic piano (1, 3, 5–9, 11), synthesizers (4)
- Mike Mainieri – acoustic piano (4), vibraphone (5), marimba (10), bass marimba (10)
- Hugh McCracken – guitars (1, 2, 6), acoustic guitar (7)
- Lee Ritenour – guitars (2, 3, 9)
- Jay Berliner – classical guitar (10), folk guitar (10)
- Anthony Jackson – bass guitar (1, 3, 6, 9)
- Eddie Gomez – acoustic bass (5)
- Rick Marotta – drums (1, 3, 9)
- Grady Tate – drums (5)
- Jerry Marotta – drums (6)
- David Sanborn – alto sax solo (1, 3)
- Phil Woods – alto sax solo (5)
- Michael Brecker – tenor sax solo (6)
- Randy Brecker – trumpet solo (9)
- David Nadien – violin solo (8)

Music arrangements

- Mike Mainieri – arrangements (1–7, 9–11)
- Don Sebesky – orchestration arrangements (1, 9, 11)
- Robert L. Freedman – orchestration arrangements (2)
- Marty Paich – orchestration arrangements (3–5, 8)
- Warren Bernhardt – arrangements (8)

=== Production ===
- Mike Mainieri – producer
- Scott Litt – recording, mixing (1–7, 9–11)
- Tony Bongiovi – mixing (6)
- Garry Rindfuss – second engineer
- Bob Ludwig – mastering at Masterdisk (New York, NY)
- Christine Martin – production coordinator
- Bill Gerber – art direction, design
- Simon Levy – art direction, design
- Lynn Goldsmith – photography
- Arlyne Rothberg – management

== Charts ==
Chart (1981)	Peak position
Australian Albums (Kent Music Report)	77
Canada Top Albums/CDs (RPM)	50
US Billboard 200	50
Japanese Album Charts	56
New Zealand Albums (RMNZ)	40
US Cash Box Top 100 Albums	45
