= The Right Thing to Do =

- Cover in the Netherlands

Single by Carly Simon

from the album No Secrets
- B-side: "We Have No Secrets"
- Released: March 1973
- Recorded: Autumn 1972, Trident Studios
- Genre: Soft rock
- Length: 2:57
- Label: Elektra
- Songwriter: Carly Simon
- Producer: Richard Perry

Carly Simon singles chronology
"You're So Vain" (1972)	"The Right Thing to Do" (1973)	"Mockingbird" (1974)

Official audio
- "The Right Thing to Do" (2015 Remaster) on YouTube

"The Right Thing to Do" is a song written and performed by Carly Simon that first appeared on her 1972 album No Secrets as its opening track. The song was recorded at Trident Studios in London's Soho. It was released as the second single to the album, following "You're So Vain" and reached No. 17 on the Billboard Hot 100 and No. 4 on Billboard's Adult Contemporary chart. It also reached No. 20 on the Canada Top Singles chart and No. 9 on the Canadian Adult Contemporary chart. It also reached the same peak of No. 17 in the UK singles chart.

== Lyrics and music ==
"The Right Thing to Do" is a love song directed to Simon's then husband James Taylor. Simon has stated that "it was actually one of my absolutely undisputed songs about James, written three months into our relationship." Author Sheila Weller notes that the song is both romantic and realistic about the relationship. She shows the romanticism by disregarding her lover's problems but realistic in recognizing "her fading value in the sex-and-love marketplace." To Weller, the latter is displayed in the lines:

And it used to be for a while
The river flowed right to my door
Making me just a little too free
But now the river doesn't seem to stop here anymore

Simon acknowledged that Taylor helped "with a lot of the changes" after she had written the original lyrics and music. Taylor claimed that he told Simon that he liked everything except the original third verse; Simon replaced the verse and Taylor approved. Simon took the line "loving you is the right thing to do", which gave the song its title, from the movie The Last Picture Show. AllMusic critic Joe Viglione and Billboard both praised the song's production by producer Richard Perry. Viglione also comments on Simon's "heartfelt" vocal performance. Simon accompanies herself on piano, and other instrumentation includes bass guitar, drums, congas, horns, and strings. Vicki Brown and Liza Strike also provide backing vocals. Billboard considered the "light horn backing" to be particularly effective in making the song catchy.

== Reception ==
Weller described the melody as "fetching." Carly Simon biographer Stephen Davis remarks on the song’s "sweet and lulling acoustics." Viglione calls it a "great pop record" and "two minutes and fifty-seven seconds of sublime Adult Contemporary radio music", adding "There's enough tension and drama, especially in the middle eight, to lift this title above most of the introspection on the album, reaching out to all the hopeless romantics who just couldn't help but relate to it." Viglione also suggests that Simon reused the formula of "The Right Thing to Do" a year later for her bigger hit "Haven't Got Time for the Pain."

Cashbox said that it has "fine vocals and a most interesting set of lyrics." Record World said that the song "should have no trouble and prove that [Carly Simon] can do no wrong."

== Personnel ==
- Carly Simon – lead vocals, backing vocals, piano
- Jimmy Ryan – bass guitar
- Andy Newmark – drums
- Ray Cooper – congas
- Vicki Brown – backing vocals
- Liza Strike – backing vocals
- Kirby Johnson – string and horn arrangement

== Track listing ==
7" single

- "The Right Thing To Do" – 2:57
- "We Have No Secrets" – 3:57

== Chart performance ==
=== Weekly singles charts ===
Chart (1973)	Peak position
Canada (RPM) Top Singles	20
Canada (RPM Charts) Adult Contemporary	9
New Zealand (Listener)	13
UK Singles Chart	17
US Billboard Pop Singles (Hot 100)	17
US Billboard Adult Contemporary	4
U.S. Cash Box Top 100	10
Quebec (ADISQ)	25

=== Year-end charts ===
Chart (1973)	Rank
U.S. Billboard Hot 100	136

== Other appearances and covers ==
"The Right Thing to Do" has been included on several Carly Simon compilation albums, including The Best of Carly Simon (1975), the three-disc box set Clouds in My Coffee (1995), The Very Best of Carly Simon: Nobody Does It Better (1998), the two-disc Anthology (2002), Reflections: Carly Simon's Greatest Hits (2004) and the three-disc Carly Simon Collector's Edition (2009). It was also included on Simon's live album Greatest Hits Live (1988). Simon sang "The Right Thing to Do" at the 1986 wedding of Caroline Kennedy to Edwin Schlossberg.

Ray Conniff covered "The Right Thing to Do" on his 1972 album You Are the Sunshine of My Life. Karrin Allyson remade the song for her 2004 album Wild For You. Megan Mullally sang a duet version of the song with Simon on the TV soundtrack Will & Grace: Let the Music Out!

== "We Have No Secrets" ==
The B-side of "The Right Thing to Do" single was "We Have No Secrets," also a song from the No Secrets album. According to Weller, "'We Have No Secrets,' was both personally—echoing Carly's boundary-less but betrayal-laced childhood family life—and culturally resonant." According to Simon biographers Charles and Ann Morse, it portrays Simon's efforts to remain honest with herself and others throughout her life. The lyrics reflect on the tension between desire to know more about one's lover's past and the fact that sometimes that knowledge is painful. The lyrics acknowledge that there are some things one may not want to know. Weller regards the line "You always answer my questions/But they don't always answer my prayers" as "[nailing] the tension between" the supposed desirability of open, non-monogamous marriages and the reality that people want to be their lover's sole partner. Rolling Stone critic Stephen Holden regarded "We Have No Secrets" as exemplifying the theme of No Secrets, which he saw as the "difficulty of being happy," by "painfully" expressing "the realization that emotion and rationalization are often irreconcilable."

Fox News Sunday used "We Have No Secrets" as bumper music over a clip of United States Secret Service agents when they arrived for the Ken Starr grand jury hearing. "We Have No Secrets" has been included on multiple Carly Simon compilation albums, including The Best of Carly Simon, Clouds in My Coffee, The Very Best of Carly Simon: Nobody Does It Better, Anthology, the import version of Reflections: Carly Simon's Greatest Hits and the three-disc Carly Simon Collector's Edition.
