= Carly Simon (album) =

Studio album by Carly Simon
- Released: February 9, 1971
- Recorded: 1970–1971
- Studios: Electric Lady Studios, New York City
- Genre: Folk rock
- Length: 38:26
- Label: Elektra
- Producer: Eddie Kramer

Carly Simon chronology
Carly Simon (1971)	Anticipation (1971)

Singles from Carly Simon
- 1. "That's the Way I've Always Heard It Should Be" Released: April 1971

Carly Simon is the debut studio album by American singer-songwriter Carly Simon, released by Elektra Records, on February 9, 1971.

The album was produced by Eddie Kramer, who had previously worked with Joe Cocker and Jimi Hendrix, and included Simon's first Top 10 hit, "That's the Way I've Always Heard It Should Be", which earned her a nomination for the Grammy Award for Best Female Pop Vocal Performance in 1972. Written by Simon and frequent collaborator Jacob Brackman, the song was a somber ballad centered on a woman pondering marriage with a sense of both inevitability and entrapment. The album also earned Simon the Grammy Award for Best New Artist at the same ceremony.

The album features material written by Simon, with additional writing by Brackman, Kramer, and Fred Gardner, as well as covers of songs by Mark Klingman and Buzzy Linhart.

== Reception ==
Professional ratings
Review scores
Source	Rating
AllMusic	3.5/5 stars
Christgau's Record Guide	C−

The album was mostly well received by music critics upon release. Timothy Crouse, writing in Rolling Stone, stated "Carly's voice perfectly matches her material" and her "superbly controlled voice is complemented by deft arrangements." Robert Christgau, writing for The Village Voice, was less impressed; "I suppose it makes sense not only for the privileged to inflict their sensibilities on us, but for many of us to dig it." In more recent years, William Ruhlmann, writing for AllMusic, rated the album 31/2-stars-out-of-5, and listed the tracks "That's the Way I've Always Heard It Should Be" and "Dan, My Fling" as stand-outs.

In a retrospective assessment, music scholar Kim Simpson deemed "That's the Way I've Always Heard It Should Be" an "early soft rock masterpiece."

Simon stated in the Ask Carly section on her website that "Reunions" was her mother's—Andrea Simon—favorite song of hers.

== Awards ==
Year	Award	Category	Recipient/Work	Result	Ref.
1972	Grammy Awards	Best New Artist	Carly Simon	Won	
1972	Grammy Awards	Best Pop Vocal Performance, Female	"That's the Way I've Always Heard It Should Be"	Nominated	

== Track listing ==
Credits adapted from the album's liner notes.

Side one
No.	Title	Writer(s)	Length
1.	"That's the Way I've Always Heard It Should Be"	Carly Simon; Jacob Brackman	4:15
2.	"Alone"	Simon	3:36
3.	"One More Time"	Simon	3:32
4.	"The Best Thing"	Simon	4:14
5.	"Just a Sinner"	Moogy Klingman	3:10

Side two
No.	Title	Writer(s)	Length
1.	"Dan, My Fling"	Brackman; Fred Gardner	5:28
2.	"Another Door"	Simon	3:16
3.	"Reunions"	Simon; Bill Mernit; Eddie Kramer	3:06
4.	"Rolling Down the Hills"	Simon	3:35
5.	"The Love's Still Growing"	Buzzy Linhart	4:14
Total length:			38:26

== Personnel ==
=== Musicians ===
- Carly Simon – vocals, acoustic piano, guitar
- Paul Griffin – keyboards
- Mark "Moogy" Klingman – keyboards
- Billy Mernit – keyboards
- David Bromberg – guitar
- Jimmy Ryan – guitar
- Jimmy Johnson – guitar
- Jeff Baxter – pedal steel guitar
- Jerry Jemmott – bass
- Tony Levin – bass
- Jim Wilkins – bass
- John Siomos – drums
- Harvey Shapiro – cello
- Ed Freeman – string arrangements (1, 8, 10)
- Pat Rebillot – string arrangements (2)

=== Production ===
- Producer – Eddie Kramer
- Engineered and Mixed by Eddie Kramer and Dave Palmer
- Art Direction and Design – Robert L. Heimall
- Cover Photography and Poster – Peter Simon
- Back Cover Photography – Joel Brodsky

== Charts ==
=== Weekly charts ===
Chart (1971)	Peak position
Australian Albums (Kent Music Report)	55
Canada Top Albums/CDs (RPM)	17
US Billboard 200	30
US Cash Box Top 100 Albums	20
