= Anticipation (song) =

1971 single by Carly Simon

- Side A of US single

Single by Carly Simon

from the album Anticipation
- B-side: "The Garden"
- Released: November 25, 1971
- Recorded: 1971
- Studio: Morgan Studios, London
- Genre: Rock
- Length: 3:19
- Label: Elektra
- Songwriter: Carly Simon
- Producer: Paul Samwell-Smith

Carly Simon singles chronology
"That's the Way I've Always Heard It Should Be" (1971)	"Anticipation" (1971)	"Legend in Your Own Time" (1972)

"Anticipation" is a song written and performed by Carly Simon, and the lead single as well as the opening track from her 1971 album of the same name. The song peaked at No. 13 on the Billboard pop singles chart and at No. 3 on the Billboard Adult Contemporary chart. The song also ranked No. 72 on Billboard's Year-End Hot 100 singles of 1972, while the Anticipation album garnered Simon a Grammy Award nomination for Best Pop Female Vocalist. Simon wrote the song on the guitar in 15 minutes, as she awaited Cat Stevens to pick her up for a date.

One of Simon's biggest hits, the song has been included on several compilations of her work, including The Best of Carly Simon (1975), Clouds in My Coffee (1995), The Very Best of Carly Simon: Nobody Does It Better (1999), Anthology (2002), and Reflections: Carly Simon's Greatest Hits (2004). A live version from her 1988 album Greatest Hits Live was included on Sony BMG/Legacy's 2014 compilation release Playlist: The Very Best of Carly Simon. In 2018, the song was also used in a teaser advertisement for the ABC series The Conners.

The song was used in commercials for Heinz Ketchup through the late 1970s into the 2000s. Simon later stated: "I wasn't at all displeased with the results. It was well done, and funny." Saturday Night Live used the song in a similar fashion for its mock commercial for "Swill Mineral Water."

== Critical reception ==
Billboard called it "a blockbuster rock ballad that will spiral [Simon] right up the chart." Record World said it "is more 'up' than was 'That's the Way I've Always Heard It Should Be' and should do even better." Cash Box called it "strong material." AllMusic reviewer Joe Viglione said of the track, "In retrospect the song (and the album) are among Carly's finest." He concluded, "'Anticipation' was more than a great melody and performance, it became a pivotal bridge and foundation for fifteen years of hits."

Stephen Davis, writing for Rolling Stone, stated: "Anticipation" is a spirited examination of the tensions involved in a burgeoning romantic situation in which nobody has any idea of what's going on or what's going to happen." He continued, "Carly's fine, aggressive vocal is complemented by Paul Glanz' lyrical piano comping, and drummer Andy Newmark's rhythms are to the point. The cut winds up with a surprising coda crescendo that pithily wraps up the premise of the message about anticipating things to come–Stay right here, 'cause these are the good old days."

In addition, Simon's performance of the song in New York City at the 1971 Schaefer Music Festival was filmed for the ABC television special Good Vibrations from Central Park. Simon performed on the 2nd and 3rd of July. ABC broadcast its special on August 19, 1971. In 2009, video of Simon's performance was posted to the official Carly Simon YouTube channel, where, as of 2023, it is still available.

== Track listing ==
7" single

- "Anticipation" – 3:19
- "The Garden" – 4:08

== Charts ==
=== Weekly charts ===
Chart (1971–1972)	Peak position
Australia (Kent Music Report)	64
Canada (RPM) Top Singles	9
US Billboard Pop Singles (Hot 100)	13
US Billboard Adult Contemporary	3
US Cash Box Top 100	10

=== Year-end charts ===
Chart (1972)	Position
US Billboard Hot 100	72
US Cash Box Top 100	86
