= List of awards and nominations received by Carly Simon =

Carly Simon awards and nominations
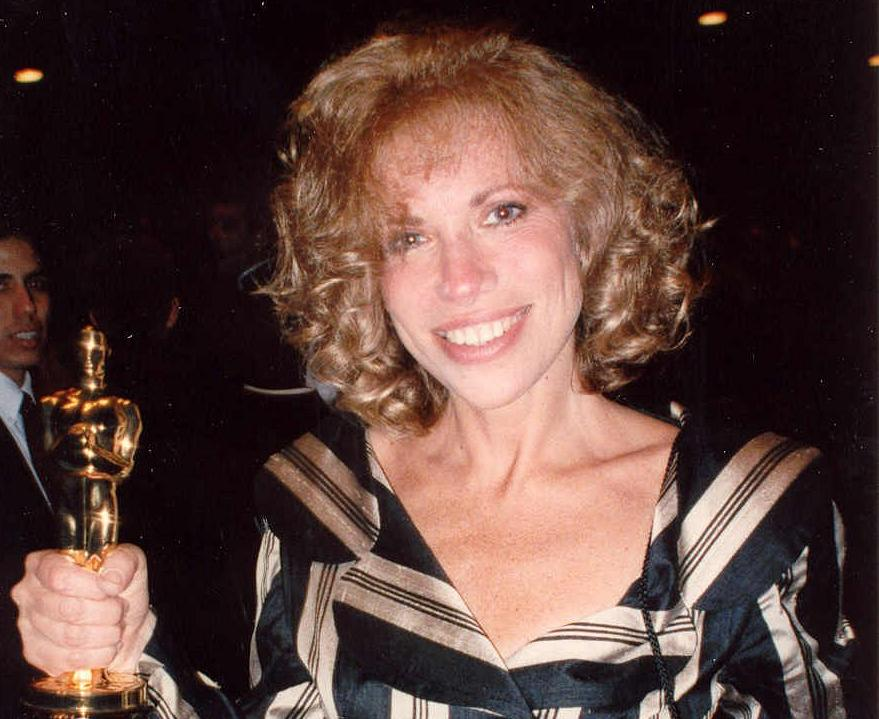
- Simon at the 61st Academy Awards in 1989
Awards and nominations
Award	Wins	Nominations
Academy Awards	1	1
BAFTA Awards	0	2
Boston Music Awards	3	8
CableACE Awards	1	3
Golden Globe Awards	1	1
Grammy Awards	2	14

The following is a list of awards, honors, and nominations received by American musician, singer, songwriter, and author Carly Simon. Among her numerous accolades, she is the recipient of two Grammy Awards, from 14 nominations, as well as an Academy Award and a Golden Globe Award. Her debut album, Carly Simon, was released in 1971 and won her the Grammy Award for Best New Artist in 1972, while the lead single "That's the Way I've Always Heard It Should Be" earned her a nomination for Best Female Pop Vocal Performance at the same ceremony. Her second album, Anticipation, earned her another Grammy nomination in the same category the following year. Her third album, No Secrets, was released in 1972 and spawned the worldwide hit "You're So Vain", which earned Simon three Grammy nominations in 1974: Record of the Year, Song of the Year, and Best Female Pop Vocal Performance. No Secrets also earned a nomination for Best Engineered Recording at the same ceremony, for engineers Robin Geoffrey Cable and Bill Schnee.

Simon's 1977 worldwide hit "Nobody Does It Better", the theme song to the Bond film The Spy Who Loved Me, garnered her another Grammy nomination for Best Female Pop Vocal Performance in 1978. The song also earned a nomination for Song of the Year, for composer Marvin Hamlisch and songwriter Carole Bayer Sager. Simon's seventh album, Boys in the Trees, was released later that year and spawned the hit single "You Belong to Me", which earned her another Grammy nomination for Best Female Pop Vocal Performance in 1979. Boys in the Trees won Best Album Package at the same ceremony; the Grammy went to Johnny Lee and Tony Lane. Simon's eighth album, Spy, was released in 1979 and its lead single, "Vengeance", earned her a Grammy nomination for Best Female Rock Vocal Performance in 1980, the first year to feature this category.

Simon released her 13th album, Coming Around Again, in 1987. It became a major hit and earned her two Grammy nominations: Best Recording for Children for "Itsy Bitsy Spider" in 1987 and Best Female Pop Vocal Performance for the album in 1988. With her 1988 hit "Let the River Run", from the film Working Girl, Simon became the first artist to win a Grammy, an Academy Award, and a Golden Globe for a song composed and written, as well as performed, entirely by a single artist. Simon's musical work on the films Working Girl and Postcards from the Edge earned her two consecutive British Academy Film Award nominations for Best Film Music, in 1990 and 1991, respectively. Simon was inducted into the Songwriters Hall of Fame in 1994. Simon received the Boston Music Awards Lifetime Achievement in 1995, and a Berklee College of Music Honorary Doctor of Music Degree in 1998. Two more Grammy nominations followed, the first for Film Noir in 1998 and the second for Moonlight Serenade in 2006, both in the category of Best Traditional Pop Vocal Album.

Simon was inducted into the Grammy Hall of Fame for "You're So Vain" in 2004, and was nominated for a star on the Hollywood Walk of Fame the following year, but she has yet to claim her star. She was awarded the Founders Award from the American Society of Composers, Authors and Publishers (ASCAP) in 2012. Simon was set to be honored at Carnegie Hall with a tribute concert on March 19, 2020, but it was postponed due to the COVID-19 pandemic. It was rescheduled to take place on March 23, 2022, but was later canceled altogether due to COVID-19–related challenges. On November 5, 2022, Simon was inducted into the Rock and Roll Hall of Fame. She was unable to attend the ceremony due to personal tragedy. She was inducted by American singer-songwriter Sara Bareilles.

== Major industry awards ==
=== Academy Awards ===
The Academy Awards, established in 1929 and organized by the Academy of Motion Picture Arts and Sciences, are a set of awards given annually for excellence of cinematic achievements. Simon has received one award, from one nomination.

Year	Work	From	Award	Result	Ref.
1989	"Let the River Run"	Working Girl	Best Original Song	Won	

- "Nobody Does It Better" was nominated for the Academy Award for Best Original Song in 1978. This nomination is credited to composer Marvin Hamlisch and songwriter Carole Bayer Sager.

=== British Academy Film Awards ===
The British Academy Film Awards (BAFTA) are presented in an annual award show hosted by the British Academy of Film and Television Arts to honor the best British and international contributions to film. Simon has received two nominations.

Year	Work	Award	Result	Ref.
1990	Working Girl	Best Film Music	Nominated	
1991	Postcards from the Edge	Best Film Music	Nominated	

=== Golden Globe Awards ===
The Golden Globe Awards are presented annually by the Hollywood Foreign Press Association to recognize outstanding achievements in film and television, both domestic and foreign. Simon has received one award, from one nomination.

Year	Work	From	Award	Result	Ref.
1989	"Let the River Run"	Working Girl	Best Original Song	Won	

- "Nobody Does It Better" was nominated for the Golden Globe Award for Best Original Song in 1978. This nomination is credited to composer Marvin Hamlisch and songwriter Carole Bayer Sager.

=== Grammy Awards ===
The Grammy Awards are awarded annually by The Recording Academy of the United States for outstanding achievements in the music industry. Often considered the highest music honor, the awards were established in 1958. Simon has won two awards, from 14 nominations, and received one honorary award.

Year	Work/Recipient	Award	Result	Ref.
1972	Carly Simon	Best New Artist	Won	
1972	"That's the Way I've Always Heard It Should Be"	Best Pop Vocal Performance, Female	Nominated	
1973	Anticipation	Best Pop Vocal Performance, Female	Nominated	
1974	"You're So Vain"	Record of the Year	Nominated	
1974	"You're So Vain"	Song of the Year	Nominated	
1974	"You're So Vain"	Best Pop Vocal Performance, Female	Nominated	
1978	"Nobody Does It Better"	Best Pop Vocal Performance, Female	Nominated	
1979	"You Belong to Me"	Best Pop Vocal Performance, Female	Nominated	
1980	"Vengeance"	Best Rock Vocal Performance, Female	Nominated	
1987	"Itsy Bitsy Spider"	Best Recording for Children	Nominated	
1988	Coming Around Again	Best Pop Vocal Performance, Female	Nominated	
1990	"Let the River Run"	Best Song Written Specifically for a Motion Picture or Television	Won	
1998	Film Noir	Best Traditional Pop Vocal Performance	Nominated	
2004	"You're So Vain"	Grammy Hall of Fame	Inducted	
2006	Moonlight Serenade	Best Traditional Pop Vocal Album	Nominated	

The following list represents Grammy Award nominations and wins connected to Simon's work, as well as work to which Simon contributed.

Year	Work	Award	Recipient	Result	Ref.
1974	No Secrets	Best Engineered Recording	Robin Geoffrey Cable and Bill Schnee	Nominated	
1976	Playing Possum	Best Album Package	Gene Christensen^{A}	Nominated	
1978	"Nobody Does It Better"	Song of the Year	Marvin Hamlisch and Carole Bayer Sager	Nominated	
1979	Boys in the Trees	Best Album Package	Johnny Lee and Tony Lane^{B}	Won	
1981	In Harmony: A Sesame Street Record	Best Album for Children	David Levine and Lucy Simon^{C}	Won	
1983	In Harmony 2	Best Album for Children	David Levine and Lucy Simon^{C}	Won	
1990	"Calotta's Heart" (from Working Girl soundtrack)	Best Arrangement, Instrumental and Vocals	Don Sebesky	Nominated	
1995	Duets	Best Traditional Pop Vocal Performance	Frank Sinatra^{D}	Nominated	
1998	"Laura" (from Film Noir)	Best Arrangement, Instrumental and Vocals	Arif Mardin	Nominated	
2002	All For You	Best Pop Vocal Album	Janet Jackson^{E}	Nominated	

Notes

- ^{A} The photographer was Norman Seeff.
- ^{B} The photo featured on the front cover of the album was expertly airbrushed to paint a Danskin top on what was a topless photo of Simon.
- ^{C} Simon was one of the various artists featured on each album.
- ^{D} Simon was one of the various artists featured on the album. She duets with Sinatra on the track "Guess I'll Hang My Tears Out to Dry/In the Wee Small Hours of the Morning".
- ^{E} Simon provides featured vocals on the tracks "Clouds" (Interlude) and "Son of a Gun (I Betcha Think This Song Is About You)".

== Other industry awards ==
=== ASCAP Awards ===
The Founders Award is presented by the American Society of Composers, Authors and Publishers. The prestigious honor is given to songwriters and composers who have made pioneering contributions to music by inspiring and influencing their fellow music creators. Simon was honored with the award in 2012.

Year	Honoree	Award	Result	Ref.
2012	Carly Simon	Founders Award	Honoree	

=== Boston Music Awards ===
The Boston Music Awards are a set of music awards given annually that showcase talent in the Boston, Massachusetts area. Founded in 1987, Simon has received eight nominations, and won three awards, as well as one honorary award.

Year	Work/Recipient	Award	Result	Ref.
1989	"Let the River Run"	Outstanding Song/Songwriter	Nominated	
1989	Carly Simon	Outstanding Female Vocalist	Nominated	
1991	Have You Seen Me Lately	Outstanding Pop Album	Nominated	
1991	Carly Simon	Outstanding Female Vocalist	Nominated	
1995	"Like a River"	Outstanding Song/Songwriter	Won	
1995	Carly Simon	Outstanding Female Vocalist	Won	
1995	Carly Simon	Hall of Fame Lifetime Achievement	Honoree	
2002	Carly Simon	Female Vocalist of the Year	Won	
2002	"Our Affair"	Song of the Year	Nominated	

=== CableACE Awards ===
The CableACE Awards, earlier known as the ACE Awards, is a defunct award that was given by what was then the National Cable Television Association from 1978 to 1997 to honor excellence in American cable television programming. Simon received three nominations and one win.

Year	Work	Award	Result	Ref.
1988	Live from Martha's Vineyard	Performance in a Music Special	Nominated	
1995	Live at Grand Central	Performance in a Music Special	Nominated	
1995	"Touched by the Sun"	Original Song	Won	

=== Hollywood Walk of Fame ===
The Hollywood Walk of Fame is a sidewalk along Hollywood Boulevard and Vine Street in Hollywood, California, with more than 2,000 five-pointed stars to honor artists for their achievement in the entertainment industry. Simon was selected for the honor in 2005, but a date was never set and she has yet to claim her star.

Year	Honoree	Award	Result	Ref.
2005	Carly Simon	Hollywood Walk of Fame	Nominated	

=== Online Film & Television Association ===
The Online Film & Television Association is an organization based online in the United States and Canada. The awards were established in 1996 and are split into two branches, film and television. Simon has received one nomination.

Year	Work	Award	Recipients	Result	Ref.
1999	Primary Colors	Best Music, Original Comedy/Musical Score	Ry Cooder and Carly Simon	Nominated	

=== Rock and Roll Hall of Fame ===
The Rock and Roll Hall of Fame, established on April 20, 1983, by Ahmet Ertegun, is museum and hall of fame located in Cleveland, Ohio. The museum documents the history of rock music and the artists, producers, engineers, and other notable figures who have influenced its development. On May 4, 2022, Simon was announced as one of the seven artists in the performer category being inducted into the Rock & Roll Hall of Fame Class of 2022. The ceremony took place on November 5, 2022.

Year	Honoree	Award	Result	Ref.
2022	Carly Simon	Rock and Roll Hall of Fame	Inducted	

=== Songwriters Hall of Fame ===
The Songwriters Hall of Fame is an American institution founded in 1969 to honor those whose work represents and maintains the heritage and legacy of a spectrum of the most beloved English language songs from the world's popular music songbook. Simon was inducted in 1994.

Year	Honoree	Award	Result	Ref.
1994	Carly Simon	Songwriters Hall of Fame	Inducted	

== Other honors and recognitions ==
- 1991 – Playing Possum ranked No. 20 on Rolling Stone's list of the 100 Classic Album Covers.
- 1998 – Received the Berklee College of Music Honorary Doctor of Music Degree.
- 1999 – Simon ranked No. 28 on VH1's 100 Greatest Women in Rock & Roll.
- 2000 – No Secrets ranked No. 997 in All Time Top 1000 Albums (3rd. edition).
- 2001 – "You're So Vain" ranked No. 216 in RIAA's Songs of the Century.
- 2004 – AFI's 100 Years...100 Songs; "Nobody Does It Better" ranked at No. 67 and "Let the River Run" ranked at No. 91.
- 2008 – Billboard Hot 100 50th Anniversary Charts: The All-Time Top 100 Songs; "You're So Vain" ranked at No. 72.
- 2012 – "Nobody Does It Better" ranked No. 3 on Rolling Stone's list, and No. 2 on Billboard's list, of the Top 10 James Bond theme songs.
- 2013 – Billboard Hot 100 55th Anniversary Charts: The All-Time Top 100 Songs; "You're So Vain" ranked at No. 82.
- 2014 – UK Official Charts Company crowned "You're So Vain" the ultimate song of the 1970s.
- 2015 – "Why" ranked No. 188 on Pitchfork's list of the 200 Best Songs of the 1980s.
- 2016 – Boys in the Trees: A Memoir ranked No. 50 on Billboard's list of the 100 Greatest Music Books of All-Time.
- 2017 – Billboard ranked Simon at No. 50 on their list of the Greatest of All-Time Hot 100 Women Artists.
- 2021 – USA Today crowned "Nobody Does it Better" the greatest James Bond Theme Song.
- 2021 – "You're So Vain" ranked No. 495 on Rolling Stone's 500 Greatest Songs of All Time.
- 2023 – Billboard ranked Simon at No. 31 on their list of the greatest adult contemporary artist of all time.

== See also ==
- Carly Simon discography
