= Anthology (Carly Simon album) =

Compilation album by Carly Simon
- Released: November 5, 2002
- Length: 155:37
- Label: Rhino

Carly Simon chronology
Christmas Is Almost Here (2002)	Anthology (2002)	Reflections: Carly Simon's Greatest Hits (2004)

Anthology is a two-disc career retrospective compilation box set by American singer-songwriter Carly Simon, released by Rhino Entertainment, on November 5, 2002.

Simon personally selected all the songs for this collection. Over the course of the two discs, every one of her studio albums (up until that point) is chronologically represented with at least one song (not including her just-released Christmas album Christmas Is Almost Here, or her 1993 opera, Romulus Hunt: A Family Opera, on which she only actually performs on one track). The booklet features numerous photographs from Simon's archives, as well as extensive liner notes by Jack Mauro, a lifelong fan of Simon's.

== Reception ==
Professional ratings
Review scores
Source	Rating
AllMusic	4.5/5 stars

Writing for AllMusic, Richie Unterberger rated the collection 41/2-stars-out-of-5, writing "For Carly Simon fans looking for something a little more extensive than a single-disc greatest-hits collection, but not something so large and expensive as her Clouds in My Coffee box set, Anthology is a good deal." Similarly, the New York Daily News wrote "Anthology is a lean and mean take on Simon's best. The 40 tracks still leave room for good ones that weren't hits. Simon's long absence has caused many listeners to forget her worth. Let this serve as a reminder."

Barnes & Noble wrote "As the recently released Anthology reminds us, Carly Simon's been delivering pop pleasures for more than 30 years. Anthology traces Carly Simon's evolution from confessional singer-songwriter to hit-making pop artist to skillful soundtrack contributor and interpreter. Comprising two CDs, each more than 75 minutes long, the set encompasses both the familiar and the neglected."

== Track listings ==
Credits adapted from the album's liner notes.

=== Disc one ===
No.	Title	Writer(s)	Original album	Length
1.	"That's the Way I've Always Heard It Should Be"	Carly Simon; Jacob Brackman	Carly Simon (1971)	4:17
2.	"One More Time"	Simon	Carly Simon (1971)	3:35
3.	"Anticipation"	Simon	Anticipation (1971)	3:22
4.	"Legend in Your Own Time"	Simon	Anticipation (1971)	3:45
5.	"Julie Through the Glass"	Simon	Anticipation (1971)	3:25
6.	"You're So Vain"	Simon	No Secrets (1972)	4:19
7.	"We Have No Secrets"	Simon	No Secrets (1972)	3:58
8.	"The Right Thing to Do"	Simon	No Secrets (1972)	2:59
9.	"Mockingbird (with James Taylor)"	Inez Foxx; Charlie Foxx; Taylor^{[a]}	Hotcakes (1974)	4:12
10.	"Haven't Got Time for the Pain"	Simon; Brackman	Hotcakes (1974)	3:55
11.	"Older Sister"	Simon	Hotcakes (1974)	3:08
12.	"Waterfall"	Simon	Playing Possum (1975)	3:32
13.	"Attitude Dancing"	Simon; Brackman	Playing Possum (1975)	3:56
14.	"In Times When My Head"	Simon	Another Passenger (1976)	3:30
15.	"Nobody Does It Better"	Carole Bayer Sager; Marvin Hamlisch	The Spy Who Loved Me (soundtrack) (1977)	3:44
16.	"You Belong to Me"	Simon; Michael McDonald	Boys in the Trees (1978)	3:53
17.	"Devoted to You (with James Taylor)"	Felice and Boudleaux Bryant	Boys in the Trees (1978)	2:31
18.	"Boys in the Trees"	Simon	Boys in the Trees (1978)	3:15
19.	"Vengeance"	Simon	Spy (1979)	4:13
20.	"Come Upstairs"	Simon	Come Upstairs (1980)	4:20
21.	"Jesse"	Simon	Come Upstairs (1980)	4:18
Total length:				77:59

=== Disc two ===
No.	Title	Writer(s)	Original album	Length
1.	"Not A Day Goes By"	Stephen Sondheim	Torch (1981)	2:43
2.	"Why"	Bernard Edwards; Nile Rodgers	Soup for One (soundtrack) (1982)	4:05
3.	"It Happens Everyday"	Simon	Hello Big Man (1983)	2:47
4.	"Orpheus"	Simon	Hello Big Man (1983)	3:53
5.	"Come Back Home"	Simon; Brackman; Aaron Zigman; Jason Scheff; Guy Thomas	Spoiled Girl (1985)	4:24
6.	"Coming Around Again"	Simon	Coming Around Again (1987)	3:42
7.	"Give Me All Night (Single version)"	Simon; Gerard McMahon	Coming Around Again (1987)	4:04
8.	"The Stuff That Dreams Are Made Of"	Simon	Coming Around Again (1987)	4:57
9.	"All I Want Is You"	Simon; Brackman; Andy Goldmark	Coming Around Again (1987)	3:59
10.	"Let the River Run"	Simon	Working Girl (soundtrack) (1989)	3:42
11.	"My Romance"	Richard Rodgers; Lorenz Hart	My Romance (1990)	2:35
12.	"Better Not Tell Her"	Simon	Have You Seen Me Lately (1990)	5:13
13.	"Love of My Life""	Simon	This Is My Life (soundtrack) (1992)	3:34
14.	"Like A River (Single version)"	Simon	Letters Never Sent (1994)	4:47
15.	"Two Little Sisters"	Simon	Marvin's Room (soundtrack) (1995)	3:24
16.	"Film Noir"	Simon; Jimmy Webb	Film Noir (1997)	3:38
17.	"Scar"	Simon	The Bedroom Tapes (2000)	5:34
18.	"Actress"	Simon	The Bedroom Tapes (2000)	4:51
19.	"Touched By The Sun (Live)"	Simon	Live at Grand Central (1995)	5:38
Total length:				77:32

Notes

- ^a signifies a writer by additional lyrics
