= Playlist: The Very Best of Carly Simon =

Greatest hits album by Carly Simon
- Released: October 27, 2014
- Recorded: 1985–2000
- Genre: Pop rock
- Length: 58:25
- Label: Legacy, Arista, Sony

Carly Simon chronology
Original Album Series (2011)	Playlist: The Very Best of Carly Simon (2014)	Songs From The Trees (A Musical Memoir Collection) (2015)

Playlist: The Very Best of Carly Simon is the fifth greatest hits album by American singer-songwriter Carly Simon, released on October 27, 2014.

A part of Sony BMG's Playlist compilation albums series, it contains selected tracks from the albums Spoiled Girl (1985), Coming Around Again (1987), Working Girl: Original Soundtrack Album (1989), Have You Seen Me Lately (1990), and The Bedroom Tapes (2000). All live recordings are from Simon's 1988 live album Greatest Hits Live, with the exception of "Touched By The Sun", which is from 1995's Live at Grand Central.

== Reception ==
Professional ratings
Review scores
Source	Rating
AllMusic	3/5 stars

AllMusic, commenting that the collection "focuses on the pop legend's mid-to late-period output", wrote "Simon fans looking for music from this specific period will find much to love here, while listeners looking for something a little more comprehensive would be better off with something like 1998's career spanning The Very Best of Carly Simon: Nobody Does It Better, or 2004's like-minded Reflections: Carly Simon's Greatest Hits."

== Track listing ==
Credits adapted from the album's liner notes.

No.	Title	Writer(s)	Original album	Length
1.	"Coming Around Again"	Carly Simon	Coming Around Again (1987)	3:42
2.	"Give Me All Night"	Simon; Gerard McMahon	Coming Around Again (1987)	4:23
3.	"All I Want Is You"	Simon; Jacob Brackman; Andy Goldmark	Coming Around Again (1987)	3:58
4.	"Nobody Does It Better"	Carole Bayer Sager; Marvin Hamlisch	Greatest Hits Live (1987)	3:44
5.	"You Belong to Me"	Simon; Michael McDonald	Greatest Hits Live (1987)	3:37
6.	"My New Boyfriend"	Simon	Spoiled Girl (1985)	4:22
7.	"Let the River Run"	Simon	Working Girl (soundtrack) (1989)	3:42
8.	"The Stuff That Dreams Are Made Of"	Simon	Coming Around Again (1987)	4:57
9.	"Better Not Tell Her"	Simon	Have You Seen Me Lately (1990)	5:21
10.	"You're So Vain"	Simon	Greatest Hits Live (1987)	4:46
11.	"Touched By The Sun"	Simon	Live at Grand Central (1995)	5:43
12.	"Anticipation"	Simon	Greatest Hits Live (1987)	3:18
13.	"Never Been Gone"	Simon; Brackman	Greatest Hits Live (1987)	3:36
14.	"Our Affair"	Simon	The Bedroom Tapes (2000)	4:15
Total length:				58:25

== Credits ==
- Tim Anderson – project direction
- John Boylan – production
- Jacob Brackman - composer
- Rob Carter – art direction, design
- Dave Donnelly – mastering
- David Field – production
- Frank Filipetti – production
- Andy Goldmark - composer
- Bob Gothard – photography
- Marvin Hamlisch - composer
- Russ Kunkel – production
- Arthur Levy – liner notes
- Jeff Magid – compilation production
- George Massenburg – production
- Michael McDonald - composer
- Gerard McMahon - composer
- Rob Mounsey – production
- Bill Payne – production
- Carole Bayer Sager - composer
- Darren Salmieri - A&R
- Paul Samwell-Smith – production
- Carly Simon – vocals, piano, production
- T-Bone Wolk – production
