= Clouds in My Coffee =

Box set by Carly Simon
- Released: November 7, 1995
- Recorded: 1965–1995
- Genre: Rock
- Length: 222:20
- Label: Arista
- Producer: Frank Filipetti and Carly Simon – Executive Producers

Carly Simon chronology
Letters Never Sent (1994)	Clouds in My Coffee (1995)	Film Noir (1997)

Clouds in My Coffee: 1965-1995 is a three-disc box set by American singer-songwriter Carly Simon, released by Arista Records, on November 7, 1995.

A full career retrospective at the time of its release, it contains 58 songs spanning Simon's career from 1965 to 1995. Simon personally curated the collection: "Choosing the material was quite a test. What makes it and what doesn't after all this time is partially a matter of where the taste and mood is on the day(s) you have to make the editorial decisions." Nine tracks were previously unreleased on any of Simon's albums. The booklet includes numerous photographs and extensive liner notes by Simon. The album's title is taken from a refrain in Simon's song "You're So Vain".

== Reception ==
Professional ratings
Review scores
Source	Rating
AllMusic	3/5 stars

A contemporary review from People stated: "It’s no secret that Carly Simon plumbs the Sturm und Drang of her life for source material. This triple-CD boxed set, spanning 30 years of her work, is a virtual autobiography in song. It boasts 58 tracks, including Top 40 hits, previously unreleased studio cuts (like 1972’s lovely country-flavored "I’m All It Takes to Make You Happy"), and collector's items (her spare version of "Take Me Out to the Ball Game"). For those doubting her range, Simon proves here that she is more than a lite-FM goddess. The biggest surprise is the way she can wrap her sultry voice around a classic like the Gershwins' "I've Got a Crush on You" or Rodgers and Hammerstein's "Something Wonderful". All in all, the package is some kinda wonderful."

A retrospective review from AllMusic stated: "Rather than focusing on hits and other material most beloved by fans, retrospectives compiled by the artists themselves tend to reflect personal favorites, overbalanced with more recent material. By organizing this three-disc set into three different, non-chronological collections, Carly Simon partially defeats those tendencies. The first disc, The Hits, performs the valuable function of bringing together most of her biggest singles, previously spread across many records on many labels. The second disc, Miscellaneous & Unreleased, seems aimed at the collector. And the third, Cry Yourself to Sleep, is the best-intentioned one of all -- though perceived as a singles artist, Simon has written some of her best and most personal music on isolated album tracks."

== Track listing ==
Credits adapted from the album's liner notes.

Disc 1: The Hits
No.	Title	Writer(s)	Original album	Length
1.	"Let the River Run"	Carly Simon	Working Girl (soundtrack) (1989)	3:40
2.	"You Belong to Me"	Simon; Michael McDonald	Boys in the Trees (1978)	3:53
3.	"Nobody Does It Better"	Carole Bayer Sager; Marvin Hamlisch	The Spy Who Loved Me (soundtrack) (1977)	3:33
4.	"Coming Around Again"	Simon	Coming Around Again (1987)	3:39
5.	"Jesse"	Simon	Come Upstairs (1980)	4:15
6.	"The Stuff That Dreams Are Made Of"	Simon	Coming Around Again (1987)	4:56
7.	"You're So Vain"	Simon	No Secrets (1972)	4:19
8.	"Touched by the Sun"	Simon	Letters Never Sent (1994)	5:28
9.	"Haven't Got Time for the Pain"	Simon; Jacob Brackman	Hotcakes (1974)	3:55
10.	"Better Not Tell Her"	Simon	Have You Seen Me Lately (1990)	5:12
11.	"Legend in Your Own Time"	Simon	Anticipation (1971)	3:45
12.	"Mockingbird"	Inez Foxx; Charlie Foxx; Taylor^{[a]}	Hotcakes (1974)	4:11
13.	"That's the Way I've Always Heard It Should Be"	Simon; Brackman	Carly Simon (1971)	4:17
14.	"All I Want Is You"	Simon; Brackman; Andy Goldmark	Coming Around Again (1987)	3:58
15.	"The Right Thing to Do"	Simon	No Secrets (1972)	2:58
16.	"Like A River"	Simon	Letters Never Sent (1994)	4:45
17.	"Anticipation"	Simon	Anticipation (1971)	3:21
18.	"Give Me All Night"	Simon; Gerard McMahon	Coming Around Again (1987)	4:23
Total length:				74:28

Disc 2: Miscellaneous & Unreleased
No.	Title	Writer(s)	Original album	Length
1.	"Angel from Montgomery"	John Prine	Previously unreleased (1972)	4:29
2.	"Raining"	Simon	Previously unreleased (1990, 1995)	3:12
3.	"I'm All It Takes to Make You Happy"	Simon	Previously unreleased (1972)	3:35
4.	"Easy on the Eyes"	Simon; Goldmark	This Is My Life (soundtrack) (1992)	4:44
5.	"Turn of the Tide"	Simon; Brackman	Free to Be... a Family (1988)	4:05
6.	"Libby"	Simon	Another Passenger (1976)	4:57
7.	"Have You Seen Me Lately?"	Simon	Have You Seen Me Lately (1990)	4:14
8.	"My New Boyfriend"	Simon	Spoiled Girl (1985)	4:19
9.	"Voulez-Vous Danser"	Simon	Romulus Hunt: A Family Opera (1993)	3:12
10.	"The Night Before Christmas"	Simon	This Is My Life (soundtrack) (1992)	3:41
11.	"Halfway 'Round The World"	Simon	Letters Never Sent (1994)	4:33
12.	"Life Is Eternal"	Simon; Teese Gohl	Have You Seen Me Lately (1990)	5:25
13.	"We Have No Secrets"	Simon	No Secrets (1972)	3:57
14.	"Why"	Bernard Edwards; Nile Rodgers	Soup for One (soundtrack) (1982)	4:06
15.	"Take Me Out to the Ballgame"	Albert Von Tilzer; Jack Norworth; Traditional	Previously unreleased - from the documentary Baseball (1994)	2:34
16.	"Back the Way"	Simon	This is My Life (soundtrack) (1992)	4:51
17.	"Itsy Bitsy Spider"	Simon (based on original nursery rhyme)	Coming Around Again (1987)	3:42
18.	"Play with Me"	Simon	Previously unreleased (1965)	2:28
19.	"My Luv Is Like a Red, Red Rose"	Lucy Simon from the poem "A Red, Red Rose" by Robert Burns	The Simon Sisters Sing for Children (1969)	2:57
Total length:				75:01

Disc 3: Cry Yourself To Sleep
No.	Title	Writer(s)	Original album	Length
1.	"It Happens Everyday"	Simon	Hello Big Man (1983)	2:45
2.	"Boys in the Trees"	Simon	Boys in the Trees (1978)	3:13
3.	"Julie Through the Glass"	Simon	Anticipation (1971)	3:24
4.	"Orpheus"	Simon	Hello Big Man (1983)	3:53
5.	"Never Been Gone"	Simon; Brackman	Spy (1979)	3:35
6.	"Happy Birthday"	Simon	Have You Seen Me Lately (1990)	4:52
7.	"Devoted To You"	Felice and Boudleaux Bryant	Boys in the Trees (1978)	2:29
8.	"Davy"	Simon	Letters Never Sent (1994)	3:41
9.	"Do The Walls Come Down"	Simon; Paul Samwell-Smith	Coming Around Again (1987)	3:54
10.	"Danny Boy"	Frederic Weatherly; Traditional	My Romance (1990)	3:21
11.	"Dink's Blues"	Traditional	Cuddlebug (1964) as The Simon Sisters	3:48
12.	"We're So Close"	Simon	Spy (1979)	5:09
13.	"Someone Waits For You"	Peter Allen; Will Jennings	Previously unreleased on CD, from the film Swing Shift (1984)	3:00
14.	"Born to Break My Heart"	Simon	Letters Never Sent (1994)	5:00
15.	"Time After Time"	Jule Styne; Sammy Cahn	My Romance (1990)	2:06
16.	"What Shall We Do with the Child"	Simon; Nicholas Holmes; Kate Horsey	Torch (1981)	2:44
17.	"I've Got a Crush on You"	George Gershwin; Ira Gershwin	The Glory of Gershwin (1994)	3:35
18.	"Something Wonderful"	Richard Rodgers; Oscar Hammerstein II	My Romance (1990)	2:12
19.	"You're The Love of My Life"	Simon	This Is My Life (soundtrack) (1992)	3:35
20.	"I Get Along Without You Very Well"	Hoagy Carmichael	Torch (1981)	3:24
21.	"By Myself / I See Your Face Before Me"	Howard Dietz; Arthur Schwartz; Howard Dietz; Arthur Schwartz	My Romance (1990)	3:11
Total length:				72:51

Notes

- ^a signifies a writer by additional lyrics
