= Greatest Hits Live (Carly Simon album) =

Live album by Carly Simon
- Released: August 2, 1988
- Recorded: June 9, 1987, live at Gay Head, Martha's Vineyard
- Genre: Rock
- Length: 45:04
- Label: Arista
- Producer: Tom "T-Bone" Wolk & Carly Simon

Carly Simon chronology
Coming Around Again (1987)	Greatest Hits Live (1988)	Working Girl (Original Soundtrack Album) (1989)

Greatest Hits Live is the first live album and second greatest hits album by American singer-songwriter Carly Simon, released by Arista Records, on August 2, 1988.

Recorded on 35MM film for a HBO special shot on Martha's Vineyard originally titled Carly Simon – Coming Around Again, it was broadcast in June 1987 and later released on home video as Live From Martha's Vineyard. The album version runs in a different track order than the video version, and three tracks from the video version are removed: "Give Me All Night", "You Have To Hurt", and "The Stuff That Dreams Are Made Of". The track "The Right Thing to Do", cut from the final televised cut of the concert, is included on the album. It would later be included on both DVD releases of the concert as a bonus feature.

== Release and reception ==
Professional ratings
Review scores
Source	Rating
AllMusic	4/5 stars

Greatest Hits Live was released on Vinyl, Cassette tape, and Compact disc. The album sold steadily, going Gold within two years, and it was officially certified Platinum by the Recording Industry Association of America (RIAA) in 1996 for sales of one million copies in the United States alone. It was also certified Gold by both Music Canada on March 29, 1990, and the British Phonographic Industry (BPI) on July 12, 2019.

AllMusic rated the album 4 out of 5 stars, and commended the material as "well performed".

== Track listing ==
Credits adapted from the album's liner notes.

No.	Title	Writer(s)	Length
1.	"Nobody Does It Better"	Marvin Hamlisch; Carole Bayer Sager	3:43
2.	"You're So Vain"	Carly Simon	4:44
3.	"It Happens Everyday"	Simon	2:38
4.	"Anticipation"	Simon	3:17
5.	"The Right Thing to Do"	Simon	2:48
6.	"Do the Walls Come Down"	Simon; Paul Samwell-Smith	4:05
7.	"You Belong To Me"	Simon; Michael McDonald	3:35
8.	"Two Hot Girls (On A Hot Summer Night)"	Simon	5:12
9.	"All I Want Is You"	Simon; Jacob Brackman; Andy Goldmark	3:55
10.	"Coming Around Again/Itsy Bitsy Spider"	Simon	7:01
11.	"Never Been Gone"	Simon; Brackman	3:38
Total length:			45:04

== Credits ==
=== Musicians ===
- Carly Simon – vocals
- T-Bone Wolk – bass guitar, piano, accordion, arranger, director
- Michael Brecker – EWI, saxophone
- Hugh McCracken – guitar
- Jimmy Ryan – guitar, background vocals
- Robbie Kondor – piano, synthesizers
- Robbie Kilgore – percussion, synthesizers
- Rick Marotta – drums, electronic drums, percussion
- Lani Groves, Frank Simms, Alexandra Taylor, Ben Taylor, Isaac Taylor, Sally Taylor, Aquinnah Witham, Elizabeth Witham, Kvitka Cisyk – background vocals

=== Production ===
- Carly Simon, T-Bone Wolk – producer
- Mike Scott – engineer
- Chris Lord-Alge – mixing
- David Hewitt – remote recording engineer, Record Plant Black Truck
- Bob Gothard – photography
- Peter Hefter, Tim Leitner – audio engineers
- Gary "Gizmo" Grim, James Hellman, Mel Papaterpos – stage technicians
- Dave Brubaker – design
- Phil Gitomer, Fritz Lange, J.B. Mattioti – remote recording

== Charts ==
Chart (1988)	Peak position
UK Albums (OCC)	49
US Billboard 200	87
US Cash Box Top 200 Albums	85

== Certifications ==
Region	Certification	Certified units/sales
Canada (Music Canada)	Gold	50,000^{^}
United Kingdom (BPI)	Gold	100,000^{‡}
United States (RIAA)	Platinum	1,000,000^{^}
^{^} Shipments figures based on certification alone.^{‡} Sales+streaming figures based on certification alone.
