= Never Been Gone =

Studio album by Carly Simon
- Released: October 27, 2009
- Recorded: 1970, Summer 2008–2009
- Genre: Pop
- Length: 49:25
- Label: Iris
- Producer: Carly Simon, Ben Taylor, Larry Ciancia, Peter Calo, David Saw, Ben Thomas

Carly Simon chronology
Carly Simon Collector's Edition (2009)	Never Been Gone (2009)	Original Album Series (2011)

International version CD cover

Never Been Gone is the 23rd studio album by American singer-songwriter Carly Simon, released by Iris Records, on October 27, 2009.

Featuring acoustic versions of many of Simon's past hits along with two new songs, "No Freedom" and "Songbird", the album peaked at No. 134 on the U.S. Billboard 200. The International version peaked at No. 45 on the United Kingdom's UK Albums Chart in 2010. It was given away free with The Mail on Sunday newspaper on March 28, 2010.

== Background ==
The album was conceived in the summer of 2008, during which time Simon was having problems promoting her previous album, This Kind of Love, which had been released through Starbucks' Hear Music label. Simon claimed that the company had failed to promote it properly. Simon's son, Ben Taylor, convinced her to channel her energies into making a new album.

Never Been Gone features new acoustic versions of many of Simon's hits spanning her career, plus two previously unreleased songs — "No Freedom", a new song written years before with her son, Ben Taylor, and singer-songwriter David Saw, and "Songbird", a demo written in 1970 and finished for this album. The album was recorded at her home on Martha's Vineyard, Massachusetts.

== Reception ==
Professional ratings
Aggregate scores
Source	Rating
Metacritic	56/100
Review scores
Source	Rating
AllMusic	2.5/5 stars
Entertainment Weekly	B+
The Guardian	3/5 stars
Los Angeles Times	3/4 stars
Mojo	3/5 stars
PopMatters	3/10
Q	2/5 stars
Record Collector	4/5 stars
Uncut	3/5 stars

Never Been Gone received overall mixed reviews. Entertainment Weekly rated the album B+ and stated "Underproducing these performances mostly works wonderfully" and credited Simon's son and producer Ben Taylor.

The Los Angeles Times rated the album 3 out of 4 stars and stated "Artists who re-record touchstone songs from their catalogs take on the burden of coming up with something different enough to make that material newly relevant. Perhaps not surprisingly, Simon's tour through her nearly four-decade catalog succeeds best when she mixes things up the most," "The opening reading of "The Right Thing to Do" is pleasant, but things pick up with the vintage R&B groove of "It Happens Everyday," then deepen with a sophisticated treatment of "Boys in the Trees", while "You Belong to Me" is given a sultry Latin jazz arrangement, possibly an outgrowth of her Brazilian-tinged 2008 album This Kind of Love," and concluded "What Simon does here is flip through the musical photo album and talk honestly about what place those old memories hold in her life now."

PopMatters was less positive, rating the album 3 out of 10 stars and writing "Why would a legendary artist go back into the studio and re-cut her best-loved hits for a new release? What makes Carly Simon’s new project especially confusing is that no one thinks her classic singles need the least bit of tinkering with; those mellow-groove adult-contemporary folk-rock vibes are what made Simon a ‘70s superstar in the first place. A few tracks were singled out for praise, such as "Anticipation" which they stated as "harkening back to a world before squeeze bottles; the song is given a softer, slower acoustic-guitar reading, which works better as it sounds fresh without being gimmicky," "The Right Thing to Do” and the terrific "Coming Around Again" are fairly straightforward readings, but are certainly not improvements, leading back to the questions about the project’s overall purpose."

== Track listing ==
Credits adapted from the album's liner notes.

No.	Title	Writer(s)	Length
1.	"The Right Thing to Do"	Carly Simon	3:46
2.	"It Happens Everyday"	Simon	4:19
3.	"Never Been Gone"	Simon; Jacob Brackman	2:55
4.	"Boys in The Trees"	Simon	4:26
5.	"Let the River Run"	Simon	3:16
6.	"You're So Vain"	Simon	5:09
7.	"You Belong to Me"	Simon; Michael McDonald	4:14
8.	"No Freedom"	Simon; David Saw; Ben Taylor	3:39
9.	"That's the Way I've Always Heard It Should Be"	Simon; Brackman	5:19
10.	"Coming Around Again"	Simon	4:53
11.	"Anticipation"	Simon	4:52
12.	"Songbird"	Simon	2:37
Total length:			49:25

Notes

- The original version and International version contain the same track listing.

== Credits ==
- Elena Barere – Concertmaster, Violin
- Margaret Bell – Vocals (Background)
- Adrian Benjamin – Viola
- Jacob Brackman – Composer, Lyricist
- Peter Calo – Arranger, Bass (Acoustic), Guitar (Acoustic), Guitar (Baritone), Lap Steel Guitar, Vocals (Background)
- Giulia Casalina – Vocals (Background)
- Larry Ciancia – Arranger, Cajon, Djembe, Drums, engineer, Percussion
- Stephanie Cummins – Celli
- Chris Davies – Engineer
- Jill Dell'Abate – String Contractor, Vocals (Background)
- Frank Filipetti – Engineer, Mixing, Vocals (Background)
- John Forté – Engineer, Guitar (Acoustic), producer, Programming, Vocals (Background)
- Toni Glickman – Violin
- Teese Gohl – Arranger, Conductor, Orchestration, Piano, String Arrangements, String Pads
- Yana Goichman – Violin
- Steven Jurgensmeyer – Artwork, Design
- Dave Kreiger – Art Direction
- Meghan La Roque – Personal Assistant
- Derik Lee – Engineer
- Anne Lehmann – Violin
- Vince Lionti – Viola
- Katherine Livolsi – Violin
- Richard Locker – Celli
- Bob Ludwig – Mastering
- Nancy McAlhany – Violin
- Eugene J. Moye – Celli
- Paphiopedilium – Producer
- Jimmy Parr – Guitar (Synthesizer), Engineer
- Carlo Pennisi – Engineer
- David Saw – Arranger, composer, Guitar (Acoustic), Vocals (Background)
- Meredith Sheldon – Vocals (Background)
- Carly Simon – Arranger, Bass, composer, Cover Photo, engineer, Guitar, Guitar (Acoustic), Guitar (Synthesizer), Instrumentation, Keyboard Programming, Layout Design, lyricist, Mixing, Piano, Vocals
- Alyssa Smith – Viola
- Ben Taylor – Arranger, composer, DJ, Drum Programming, engineer, Guitar (Acoustic), Loops, Piano, Vocals (Background)
- Sally Taylor – Vocals (Background)
- Ben Thomas – Bass, Drum Programming, Organ, Piano, Piano (Electric), producer, String Arrangements
- Christopher Thomas – Bass

== Charts ==
=== Weekly charts ===
Chart (2009)	Peak position
UK Albums (OCC)	45
US Billboard 200	134
US Americana/Folk Albums (Billboard)	11
US Independent Albums (Billboard)	22
Scottish Albums (OCC)	40
