= Coming Around Again =

Coming Around Again may refer to:

- Coming Around Again (album), an album released by Carly Simon
  - "Coming Around Again" (Carly Simon song), a single from the above album
- "Coming Around Again" (Simon Webbe song), a song and single by Simon Webbe
