= Across the Miles =

1989 single by Survivor

Single by Survivor

from the album Too Hot to Sleep
- Released: January 1989
- Studio: Royal Recorders (Lake Geneva, Wisconsin); Right Track Recording (New York City, New York)
- Genre: Hard rock
- Length: 5:51
- Label: Scotti Bros.
- Songwriters: Jim Peterik; Frankie Sullivan
- Producers: Peterik; Sullivan; Frank Filipetti

Survivor singles chronology
"Didn't Know It Was Love" (1988)	"Across the Miles" (1989)

Music video
- "Across the Miles" on YouTube

"Across the Miles" is a song by American rock band Survivor, released in January 1989 as the second single from their seventh studio album Too Hot to Sleep (1988).

The song was covered by English rock band Uriah Heep in 1998.

== Background ==
The title was taken from a greeting card reading "Across the Miles" that Jim Peterik saw at a Marshall Field's store a few weeks before the song was composed. Survivor wrote the song during a jam session at a Chicago warehouse, just before flying to New York City to record Too Hot to Sleep. The melody was developed as Frankie Sullivan and Peterik played a muted guitar and support chords on the keyboard respectively, while Peterik created the lyrics on the spot. Jimi Jamison claimed to be involved in the song's creation, though Peterik has disputed this.

A music video was made for the song. It features a scene in which Peterik, Sullivan and Jamison appear to rotate.

== Charts ==
Chart (1989)	Peak position
US Billboard Hot 100	74
US Adult Contemporary (Billboard)	16
