= Heartburn (film) =

1986 film by Mike Nichols

- Theatrical release poster
- Directed by: Mike Nichols
- Screenplay by: Nora Ephron
- Based on: Heartburn by Nora Ephron
- Produced by: Mike Nichols; Robert Greenhut
- Starring: Meryl Streep; Jack Nicholson
- Cinematography: Néstor Almendros
- Edited by: Sam O'Steen
- Music by: Carly Simon
- Distributed by: Paramount Pictures
- Release date: July 25, 1986
- Running time: 109 minutes
- Country: United States
- Language: English
- Budget: $20 million
- Box office: $52.6 million

Heartburn is a 1986 American romantic comedy-drama film produced and directed by Mike Nichols, starring Meryl Streep and Jack Nicholson. The screenplay by Nora Ephron is based on her 1983 novel, a semi-autobiographical account of her marriage to Carl Bernstein. The film marked the debuts of Natasha Lyonne and Kevin Spacey.

The song "Coming Around Again" was written and performed by Carly Simon, and became one of her biggest hits. The song reached No. 18 on the Billboard Hot 100 and No. 5 on the Billboard Adult Contemporary chart, and was soon followed by the album of the same name. The film was released in the United States on July 25, 1986.

== Plot ==
Manhattan food writer Rachel Samstat and Washington, D.C., political columnist Mark Forman meet at a mutual friend's wedding. Both have been married before and Mark has a reputation for being a serial womanizer. Despite being warned, Rachel becomes involved with him. After a whirlwind courtship, the two organize to marry in a New York City apartment. However, Rachel has reservations. Several people, including her sister, her editor, his closest friends, her father, her therapist, and finally Mark convince her to go through with the ceremony.

Mark and Rachel purchase a dilapidated townhouse, and she struggles to adapt to being a wife in Washington's political high society. The ongoing renovations of their house create some stress in Mark and Rachel's marriage, but they are brought closer together when she discovers she is pregnant. Rachel experiences a difficult labor in which the baby's life is briefly threatened, but she gives birth to a healthy baby girl, Annie.

Soon afterwards, Rachel discovers evidence of Mark's extramarital affair with socialite Thelma Rice during her pregnancy with her second child. She leaves him and takes their daughter to New York, where she moves in with her father. Going back to her old work, her boss Richard gives Rachel her job back as a food writer.

Although Rachel insists that she has left Mark for good, when Richard asks her to dinner, she says they must wait until she is officially separated. She spends days pining for Mark, and is dismayed when he fails to call. One day, Rachel inadvertently leads a burglar from the subway to a group therapy session she is attending in her therapist's apartment. He robs the group and takes Rachel's wedding ring. Later, Mark arrives and asks her to come back, insisting he will never see Thelma again.

Rachel reconciles with Mark to the still-unfinished Washington house, but is constantly checking his things to ensure he stays honest. Running into a gossipy acquaintance, Betty, in the supermarket, Rachel feeds her a nasty rumor about Thelma having an infection of some kind. Rachel maintains her writing job in New York, flying back and forth for it. On her return, Mark confronts Rachel, telling her that Thelma stopped by their house and was angry Rachel had told Betty that Thelma had herpes. Soon afterwards, Rachel's water breaks, so Mark takes her to give birth to their second child.

The New York police return Rachel's wedding ring after they catch the burglar. When she takes it to the jeweler's to get the stone tightened, he asks about an expensive necklace Mark bought for her. Rachel realizes Mark has resumed his affair with Thelma (the necklace is a birthday gift for her), so she sells the ring on the spot. Without telling Mark she knows, Rachel prepares a key lime pie for a dinner party. The subject of infidelity comes up, and she informs Mark that she knows by shoving the pie in his face. Rachel leaves with both her children for New York, this time for good.

== Cast ==
- Meryl Streep as Rachel Samstat
- Jack Nicholson as Mark Forman
- Jeff Daniels as Richard
- Maureen Stapleton as Vera
- Stockard Channing as Julie Siegel
- Richard Masur as Arthur Siegel
- Catherine O'Hara as Betty
- Steven Hill as Harry Samstat
- Miloš Forman as Dmitri
- Mamie Gummer (credited as Natalie Stern) as Annie Forman
- Karen Akers as Thelma Rice
- Anna Maria Horsford as Della
- Kenneth Welsh as Dr. Appel
- Kevin Spacey as subway thief
- Mercedes Ruehl as Eve
- Joanna Gleason as Diana
- Jack Gilpin as Ellis
- Christian Clemenson as Sidney
- Dana Ivey as wedding speaker
- John Rothman as Jonathan Rice
- Natasha Lyonne as Rachel's niece (uncredited)

== Production ==
The film was shot on location in Manhattan, Washington, D.C. and Alexandria, Virginia. Jack Nicholson replaced Mandy Patinkin after a day of shooting. Nora Ephron's screenplay is based on her 1983 autobiographical novel, and inspired by her tempestuous second marriage to Carl Bernstein and his affair with Margaret Jay, the daughter of former British Prime Minister James Callaghan.

The film's music was composed by Carly Simon. Her songs "Coming Around Again" and "Itsy Bitsy Spider" are included in the 1987 Grammy-nominated album Coming Around Again.

== Reception ==
=== Box office ===
Heartburn opened in 843 theaters in the United States on July 25, 1986, and earned $5,783,079 during its opening weekend, ranking number two at the box office behind Aliens. It eventually grossed a total of $25,314,189 in the US and Canada. Internationally it grossed $27.3 million for a worldwide total of $52.6 million.

=== Critical response ===
On the review aggregator website Rotten Tomatoes, the film holds an approval rating of 48% based on 25 reviews, with an average rating of 5.6/10. The website's critics consensus reads: "Despite an astonishing collection of talent across the board, Heartburn's aimless plot inspires mild indigestion instead of romantic ardor." Metacritic, which uses a weighted average, assigned the film a score of 49 out of 100, based on 11 critics, indicating "mixed or average" reviews. Audiences polled by CinemaScore gave the film an average grade of "B−" on an A+ to F scale.

Roger Ebert of the Chicago Sun-Times called it "a bitter, sour movie about two people who are only marginally interesting" and placed much of the blame on screenwriter Nora Ephron, who "should have based her story on somebody else's marriage. That way, she could have provided the distance and perspective that good comedy needs." He felt "she apparently had too much anger to transform the facts into entertaining fiction."

Variety thought it was "a beautifully crafted film with flawless performances and many splendid moments, yet the overall effect is a bit disappointing" and added, "While the day-to-day details are drawn with a striking clarity, Ephron's script never goes much beyond the mannerisms of middle-class life. Even with the sketchy background information, it's hard to tell what these people are feeling or what they want."

Pauline Kael of The New Yorker wrote: "The movie is full of talented people, who...are fun to watch, but after a while the scenes that don't point anywhere begin to add up, and you start asking yourself: 'What is this movie about?' You are still asking when it's over, and by then a flatness, a disappointment, is likely to have settled over the fillips you'd enjoyed," noting that "[t]hough Ephron is a gifted and a witty light essayist, her novel is no more than a variant of a princess fantasy: Rachel, the wife, is blameless; Mark, the husband, is simply a bad egg—an adulterer. And, reading the book, you don't have to take Rachel the bratty narrator very seriously; her self-pity is so thinly masked by humor and unabashed mean-spiritedness that you feel that the author is exploiting her life—trashing it by presenting it as a juicy, fast-action comic strip about a marriage of celebrities."

Leonard Maltin gave the film three stars out of a possible four, and wrote "Lightweight, superficial story is supercharged by two charismatic stars, who make it a must see."

=== Accolades ===
Award	Year	Category	Recipient(s)	Result	Ref.
Valladolid International Film Festival	1986	Golden Spike	Heartburn	Nominated	
Valladolid International Film Festival	1986	Best Actress	Meryl Streep	Won	
American Comedy Awards	1987	Funniest Actress in a Motion Picture (Leading Role)	Meryl Streep	Nominated	
Jupiter Awards	1988	Best Actress	Meryl Streep	Nominated	
