= Better Not Tell Her =

- CD Single cover

Single by Carly Simon

from the album Have You Seen Me Lately
- B-side: "Happy Birthday"
- Released: 1990
- Recorded: 1990
- Genre: Pop; Rock
- Length: 5:13 (Album version); 4:49 (Single version)
- Label: Arista
- Songwriter: Carly Simon
- Producers: Frank Filipetti; Paul Samwell-Smith

Carly Simon singles chronology
"Let the River Run" (1989)	"Better Not Tell Her" (1990)	"Love of My Life" (1992)

"Better Not Tell Her" is a song written and performed by American singer-songwriter Carly Simon, and produced by Frank Filipetti and Paul Samwell-Smith. The opening track from Simon's 15th studio album, Have You Seen Me Lately (1990), the song also served as the album's lead single.

A salsa-infused track, the song features a Spanish guitar solo by Jay Berliner. Entertainment Weekly called it a "mildly bittersweet love song" that sounds "firm, tender, and genuine" with a "pointed melody" and "an airy outdoor aura." The single was a huge Adult Contemporary hit, remaining on the Billboard Adult Contemporary chart for 21 weeks, peaking at No. 4, and becoming Simon's biggest hit of the entire decade. The second single from the album, "Holding Me Tonight", was also successful on this chart, peaking at No. 36. Simon released music videos for both singles, and they each received airplay on VH1.

The song is one of Simon's biggest Adult contemporary hits, and has been included on multiple compilations of her work, such as the three-disc box set Clouds in My Coffee (1995), the UK release The Very Best of Carly Simon: Nobody Does It Better (1998), the two-disc retrospective Anthology (2002), the single-disc Reflections: Carly Simon's Greatest Hits (2004), and Sony Music's Playlist: The Very Best of Carly Simon (2014).

== Formats and track listings ==
7" single

- "Better Not Tell Her" – 4:40
- "Happy Birthday" – 4:54

CD single

- "Better Not Tell Her" – 4:45

== Charts ==
Chart (1990)	Peak position
Canada Top Singles (RPM)	30
Canada Adult Contemporary (RPM)	3
US Adult Contemporary (Billboard)	4
Quebec (ADISQ)	15
US Cash Box Looking Ahead Chart	103

== Music video ==
Simon filmed a sensual music video for the track, which was shot on a beach on Martha's Vineyard in July 1990 - at the estate of Jackie Onassis. The video alternates between clips of Simon on the beachfront in the day, during the evening in the same sitting, and at night with a roaring bonfire while she and company dance around and play guitars.
