= The Bedroom Tapes =

Studio album by Carly Simon
- Released: May 16, 2000
- Studios: The bedroom, play barn and Sonic Brothers at Martha's Vineyard; Right Track Recording, Sound On Sound and Edison Recording Studios (New York City, New York)
- Genre: Rock
- Length: 56:39
- Label: Arista
- Producers: Carly Simon; Tesse Gohl; Frank Filipetti; David Fields; Eric Bazillian

Carly Simon chronology
The Very Best of Carly Simon: Nobody Does It Better (1998)	The Bedroom Tapes (2000)	Christmas Is Almost Here (2002)

The Bedroom Tapes is the 18th studio album by American singer-songwriter Carly Simon, released by Arista Records, on May 16, 2000.

The album received widespread critical acclaim upon release, and Simon promoted it through many television appearances; notably on Good Morning America, where she performed a concert in Bryant Park on May 19, 2000, which featured songs from the album, as well as some of her classic hits, such as "You're So Vain" and "Nobody Does It Better". Despite the warm reception, the album soon went out of print. In 2002, Simon released autographed limited editions of The Bedroom Tapes, with two bonus tracks: "Grandmother's House" and "Sangre Dolce". The release was limited to only 100 copies. Simon later included "Sangre Dolce" on her 2008 album This Kind of Love. The opening track, "Our Affair", was remixed by Richard Perry and featured on the soundtrack album of the 2000 Don Roos film Bounce, starring Gwyneth Paltrow and Ben Affleck.

On April 6, 2015, Simon re-released the album as a special edition CD with two bonus tracks: "When Manhattan Was a Maiden" and the aforementioned "Grandmother's House". Produced by C'est Music, the re-release was through the Carly Simon Vintage Line, and can be purchased exclusively through Simon's official website.

== Reception ==
Professional ratings
Review scores
Source	Rating
AllMusic	3/5 stars

Writing for AllMusic, MacKenzie Wilson said Simon "is as raw as she was on 1975's Playing Possum and just as sweet as 1987's Coming Around Again, but Simon is fresh. Although in her mid-fifties, she is still a charmer," concluding "The Bedroom Tapes is pure, and Carly Simon proves herself to be well grounded. Not that listeners didn't already know that." Similarly, People wrote that the album "unfolds like a one-woman show," calling it a "Boffo performance."

Billboard called the album "A feast for fans of intelligent, richly crafted pop music," and wrote: "With her first collection of original compositions in five years, Simon reminds the young wannabes who continually crib her classic recordings for ideas how it's really done," and concluded "At a time when more simplistic fare dominates the charts, the commercial future of The Bedroom Tapes is hard to predict. But ya gotta love and respect Simon for her commitment to continually raising the creative bar- and for serving as such a strong role model for young tunesmiths."

Rolling Stone called it "A bang up album. Her balance of excellent pop thrills and writing remains singular. The Carly Simon of The Bedroom Tapes shines." NY Daily News called it "one of her best albums", stating "The Bedroom Tapes finds Simon returning to the sharp-eyed commentary and unflinching candor of her best-loved work of the 70's." The Miami Herald wrote "Adults rejoice. Few albums manage to touch the heart and challenge the brain as this gem does." Us Weekly stated "These disarmingly personal songs are pure catharsis. Who needs support groups? The Bedroom Tapes is classy work from one of pop's original confessors."

== Awards ==
Year	Award	Category	Work/Recipient	Result	Ref.
2002	Boston Music Awards	Song of the Year	"Our Affair"	Nominated	
2002	Boston Music Awards	Female Vocalist of the Year	Carly Simon	Won	

== Track listing ==
Credits adapted from the album's liner notes.

No.	Title	Writer(s)	Length
1.	"Our Affair"	Carly Simon	4:16
2.	"So Many Stars"	Simon	5:35
3.	"Big Dumb Guy"	Simon; Tom Wolk; Larry Ciancia; Jesse Farrow	5:54
4.	"Scar"	Simon	5:32
5.	"Cross the River"	Simon	5:59
6.	"I Forget"	Simon	4:33
7.	"Actress"	Simon	4:48
8.	"I'm Really the Kind"	Simon	4:27
9.	"We Your Dearest Friends"	Simon	4:49
10.	"Whatever Became of Her"	Simon	4:56
11.	"In Honor of You (George)"	Simon; George Gershwin; Ira Gershwin	5:50
Total length:			56:39

Bonus tracks on 2002 limited edition
No.	Title	Writer(s)	Length
12.	"Grandmother's House"	Simon	5:39
13.	"Sangre Dolce"	Simon	3:11
Total length:			65:29

Bonus tracks on 2015 special edition
No.	Title	Writer(s)	Length
12.	"Grandmother's House"	Simon	5:39
13.	"When Manhattan Was a Maiden"	Simon	5:21
Total length:			67:39

== "When Manhattan Was a Maiden" ==
"When Manhattan Was a Maiden" is a song that was the original inspiration and title for what became The Bedroom Tapes. As the concept of the album evolved, Simon ultimately decided to drop the song, and it was never commercially released. In 2002, Simon posted the original demo of the song on her official website for streaming.

The song was included on the 2015 re-release of the album.

== Credits ==
=== Personnel ===
- Carly Simon – vocals, backing vocals (1, 2, 4, 7, 8), keyboards (1, 2, 4–10), acoustic guitar (1, 4, 7–10), electric guitar (1, 9, 10), percussion (1, 3, 4, 8, 9), guitars (2), bass (2), drum programming (2, 3, 5, 7–9), congas (3), organ (5, 10), keyboard bass (7, 9), marimba (11)
- Teese Gohl – organ (5), orchestra arrangements and conductor (5, 8, 11), acoustic piano (9), all instrumental programming (11)
- Andrew Felluss – additional organ (10)
- Stuart Kimball – acoustic guitar (1, 10), electric guitar (1, 9, 10)
- Eric Bazilian – electric guitar (6), keyboards (12), programming (12), guitars (12), bass (12), drums (12)
- Peter Calo – rhythm guitar (2)
- Michael Lockwood – electric guitar (3, 4, 7), acoustic guitar (4)
- T-Bone Wolk – bass (1–3, 5, 8–10), acoustic piano (3), electric guitar (3), acoustic guitar (3), dobro (3), mandolin (9)
- Tony Garnier – bass (6)
- Steve Gadd – drums (1, 2, 5–7, 9, 11), percussion (5, 8, 10)
- Larry Ciancia – drums (3)
- Shawn Pelton – drums (11)
- Mindy Jostyn – violin (8, 10)
- Aaron Heick – saxophone (11)
- Liam Ó Maonlaí – backing vocals (2, 4, 5, 8), flute (4)
- The Rankin Sisters – backing vocals (2, 4, 5, 7, 8, 12)
- John Forté – backing vocals (3)
- Ben Taylor – backing vocals (3, 8)

=== Production ===
- Keith Naftaly – A&R
- Carly Simon – producer (1–10, 12, 13)
- David Fields – co-producer (1–10)
- Frank Filipetti – co-producer (1–10)
- Teese Gohl – producer (11)
- Eric Bazilian – co-producer (12)
- Jill Dell'Abate – production supervisor, music contractor
- Robin Mathiesen – personal assistant to Carly Simon, booklet back cover photography
- Margary Greenspan – album art direction
- Ken Levy – album art direction
- Bob Gothard – photography
- Abe Hoch and Wendy Laister for Magus Entertainment – management

Technical credits

- Mark Wilder – mastering at Sony Music Studios (New York, NY)
- Frank Filipetti – recording, mixing
- Jimmy Parr – recording, home studio set-up
- Carly Simon – recording
- Ed Tuton – recording
- Mark Feldman – assistant engineer
- Andrew Felluss – assistant engineer
- Jason Stasium – assistant engineer
- Bobby Eichorn – home studio set up
- Peter Moshay – home studio set-up

== Charts ==
Chart (2000)	Peak position
US Billboard 200	90
