= Love of My Life (Carly Simon song) =

- Reprise promo CD cover

Single by Carly Simon

from the album This Is My Life (Music from the Motion Picture)
- Released: 1992
- Recorded: 1992
- Genre: Pop
- Length: 3:35
- Label: Qwest
- Songwriter: Carly Simon

Carly Simon singles chronology
"Better Not Tell Her" (1990)	"Love of My Life" (1992)	"Son of a Gun (I Betcha Think This Song Is About You)" (2001)

"Love of My Life" is a song written and performed by American singer-songwriter Carly Simon, featured in 1992 Nora Ephron film This Is My Life, and its accompanying soundtrack album.

As a single, it reached the top 20 on the Billboard Adult Contemporary chart, peaking at No. 16 and remaining on the chart for 15 weeks. It has been featured on multiple compilations of Simon's work, such as the three-disc box set Clouds in My Coffee (1995), the two-disc retrospective Anthology (2002), and the single-disc Reflections: Carly Simon's Greatest Hits (2004).

== Composition and lullaby version ==
Writer and director Nora Ephron called Simon in 1991 and asked her to score her upcoming film, This Is My Life. Ephron told Simon: "It's 'our story', about the tricky business of raising children and maintaining a solid career, without the benefit of a live-in father". Simon has stated the inspiration for the song was her children, Ben Taylor and Sally Taylor. Simon released a music video for the song, which featured her son Ben Taylor, along with clips from the film.

Simon re-recorded the song as a lullaby version for her 2007 album Into White. In this version, she altered the names in the first verse from "Woody Allen" to "Mia Farrow", and removed the third verse altogether.

== Track listing ==
CD single

- "Love of My Life" (Radio Version) – 3:35

== Charts ==
Chart (1992)	Peak Position
US Adult Contemporary (Billboard)	16
Canada Top Singles (RPM)	88
Canada Adult Contemporary (RPM)	25
Quebec (ADISQ)	36
