= Coming Around Again (Carly Simon song) =

1986 single by Carly Simon

Single by Carly Simon

from the album Coming Around Again and Heartburn soundtrack
- B-side: "Itsy Bitsy Spider"
- Released: August 1986
- Length: 3:41
- Label: Arista
- Songwriter: Carly Simon
- Producers: Russ Kunkel, Bill Payne and George Massenburg with Paul Samwell-Smith

Carly Simon singles chronology
"My New Boyfriend" (1985)	"Coming Around Again" (1986)	"Give Me All Night" (1987)

"Coming Around Again" is a song by American singer-songwriter Carly Simon, written for the film Heartburn (1986)—based on Nora Ephron's novel of the same name, a semi-autobiographical account of her marriage to Carl Bernstein—and later appeared on the album of the same name, Coming Around Again (1987). Released as a single in 1986, it became one of Simon's biggest hits, peaking at No. 18 on the US Billboard Hot 100 and No. 5 on the Billboard Adult Contemporary chart. It was also a top-10 hit in Austria, Ireland, the Netherlands, Sweden, and the United Kingdom.

The success of the song began a career resurgence for Simon. It is featured on multiple compilations of her work, including the three-disc box set Clouds in My Coffee (1995), the UK import The Very Best of Carly Simon: Nobody Does It Better (1998), the two-disc retrospective Anthology (2002), the single-disc Reflections: Carly Simon's Greatest Hits (2004), and Sony Music's Playlist: The Very Best of Carly Simon (2014).

== "Itsy Bitsy Spider" ==
A similar stripped-down arrangement of "Coming Around Again" (key of C) was used in Simon's recording of the classic children's song "Itsy Bitsy Spider" (key of G), which was the B-side of the single and also included on the Coming Around Again album.

When the song is sung as part of a medley, as it is on the 1987 album Greatest Hits Live which is the soundtrack to her HBO special Live from Martha's Vineyard, there is an extended turnaround acting not only as a bridge between the two songs, but also as a bridge between the two keys.

== Reception ==
"Coming Around Again" became a worldwide hit; in the US, it peaked at No. 18 on the Billboard Hot 100, becoming Simon's 12th top-40 hit on the chart, and No. 5 on the Billboard Adult Contemporary chart, becoming her 19th top-40 hit on this chart. The song was a success in Brazil, as it was included in the soundtrack of the telenovela O Outro. It was released as a single in the United Kingdom in January 1987, and reached a peak position of No. 10 on the UK Singles Chart in late February. Additionally, the song reached No. 15 in South Africa, No. 29 in Australia and No. 38 in Canada. It was most successful in Sweden, Ireland and Austria, reaching No. 3, No. 5 and No. 6, respectively.

Billboard said the song's "moody sway is comparable to the Thompsons' 'Hold Me Now.'"

== Music video ==
A music video for this song was filmed and went into heavy rotation in 1987. The video featured a home movie featuring Carly Simon as a baby and as a young child with her parents.

== Track listings and formats ==
7-inch single (worldwide)

1. "Coming Around Again" – 3:31
2. "Itsy Bitsy Spider" – 3:34

12-inch and CD single (UK, Germany)

1. "Coming Around Again" – 3:31
2. "Itsy Bitsy Spider" – 3:34
3. "If It Wasn't Love" – 4:18

Cassette EP single (US)

1. "Coming Around Again/Itsy Bitsy Spider" (Live at Martha's Vineyard) – 7:04
2. "Turn of the Tide" (1988 Democratic Convention Theme/Free to be a Family) – 4:04
3. "Let the River Run" (Theme from Working Girl) – 3:40

== Personnel ==
- Carly Simon – lead vocals, backing vocals, keyboards
- Scott Martin – keyboards, backing vocals
- Bill Payne – keyboards
- Russ Kunkel – drums
- Terri Homberg – backing vocals
- Paul Samwell-Smith – backing vocals

== Charts ==
=== Weekly charts ===
Weekly chart performance for "Coming Around Again"
Chart (1986–1987)	Peak position
Australia (Australian Music Report)	29
Austria (Ö3 Austria Top 40)	6
Belgium (Ultratop 50 Flanders)	14
Canada Top Singles (RPM)	38
Canada Adult Contemporary (RPM)	7
Europe (Eurochart Hot 100)	22
European Airplay (European Hit Radio)	7
Germany (GfK)	21
Ireland (IRMA)	5
Italy Airplay (Music & Media)	19
Luxembourg (Radio Luxembourg)	7
Netherlands (Dutch Top 40)	10
Netherlands (Single Top 100)	15
Quebec (ADISQ)	39
South Africa (Springbok Radio)	15
Sweden (Sverigetopplistan)	3
UK Singles (Official Charts)	10
US Billboard Hot 100	18
US Adult Contemporary (Billboard)	5

=== Year-end charts ===
1987 year-end chart performance for "Coming Around Again"
Chart (1987)	Position
European Hot 100 Singles (Music & Media)	76
Netherlands (Dutch Top 40)	100
UK Singles (OCC)	94

== Certifications ==
Certifications for "Coming Around Again"
Region	Certification	Certified units/sales
United Kingdom (BPI)	Silver	200,000^{‡}
^{‡} Sales+streaming figures based on certification alone.

== Duet with Alanis Morissette ==
In 2025, Canadian rock singer-songwriter Alanis Morissette recorded a duet version of the song with Carly Simon. The version was released in all digital platforms. The duet version was featured in the film My Mother's Wedding.

=== Charts ===
Weekly chart performance for "Coming Around Again"
Chart (2025)	Peak position
UK Singles Downloads (Official Charts)	20
US Digital Song Sales (Billboard)	6
