= All I Want Is You (Carly Simon song) =

- UK vinyl cover

Single by Carly Simon

from the album Coming Around Again
- B-side: "Two Hot Girls" (US); "You Have To Hurt" (UK)
- Released: 1987
- Recorded: 1987
- Genre: Soft rock
- Length: 3:58 (album version); 3:40 (single version)
- Label: Arista
- Songwriters: Andy Goldmark, Simon, Jacob Brackman

Carly Simon singles chronology
"The Stuff That Dreams Are Made Of" (1987)	"All I Want Is You" (1987)	"Let the River Run" (1989)

"All I Want Is You" is the fourth and final single from Carly Simon's 13th studio album Coming Around Again (1987). The song was co-written by Simon, Andy Goldmark, and frequent collaborator Jacob Brackman.

The song is one of Simon's biggest Adult contemporary hits, and has been included on multiple compilations of her work, such as the three-disc box set Clouds in My Coffee (1995), the UK import The Very Best of Carly Simon: Nobody Does It Better (1998), the two-disc retrospective Anthology (2002), the single-disc Reflections: Carly Simon's Greatest Hits (2004), and Sony Music's Playlist: The Very Best of Carly Simon (2014). It is also featured in Simon's 1987 HBO concert special Live from Martha's Vineyard, and the accompanying Greatest Hits Live (1988).

== Reception ==
"All I Want Is You" peaked at No. 54 on the Billboard Hot 100, becoming Simon's 22nd entry on this chart, where it spent nine weeks. It was an even greater success on the Billboard Adult Contemporary chart, where it peaked at No. 7, and charted for five months. It ranked No. 46 on the Adult Contemporary year-end chart for 1988.

Cash Box said that "Simon turns in yet another outstanding vocal performance."

== Track listings and formats ==
7" single (US)

1. "All I Want Is You" (Single edit) – 3:40
2. "Two Hot Girls (On A Hot Summer Night)" – 4:51

7" single (UK)

1. "All I Want Is You" – 3:58
2. "You Have To Hurt" – 4:04

== Personnel ==
- Carly Simon – lead vocals
- Andy Goldmark – keyboards, drum machine
- Robbie Kilgore – keyboards, synth bass
- Jimmy Maelen – percussion
- Rob Mounsey – string arrangements and conductor
- David Nadien – concertmaster
- Roberta Flack – backing vocals

== Charts ==
=== Weekly charts ===
Chart (1987)	Peak position
US Billboard Hot 100	54
US Adult Contemporary (Billboard)	7
Quebec (ADISQ)	35

=== Year-end charts ===
Chart (1988)	Position
US Adult Contemporary (Billboard)	46
