= Carly Simon: Live from Martha's Vineyard =

- Original VHS cover

Video by Carly Simon
- Released: 1988
- Recorded: June 1987, Martha's Vineyard, Massachusetts
- Genre: Live, pop, adult contemporary
- Length: 70 minutes

Cover of 2004 and 2010 DVD releases

Carly Simon: Live from Martha's Vineyard is a 1987 HBO concert special featuring Carly Simon recorded live on the shores of Martha's Vineyard. It featured Simon and a live band performing the majority of her Coming Around Again album as well as her classic hits such as "Anticipation", "You're So Vain", "Nobody Does It Better", and "You Belong to Me".

On its first screening and release on HBO, the concert was titled "Carly Simon – Coming Around Again".

Simon received a CableACE Award nomination for Performance in a Music Special in 1988.

== Production and release history ==
The concert was filmed in the town of Gay Head on a specially built stage overlooking Menemsha harbor over two days in early June 1987. The weather was very different over the two days, with the first being cloudy and misty and the second being bright and sunny, Simon recalls in several interviews that the original idea was to film both nights and then choose the best performances of each between them, but with the wildly different weather though, of course, it was not possible to intercut between performances. As a result, Simon reports that not only did she prefer the first evening's performance overall, but that the clouds and marine spray lent a certain air of mystery and intrigue as a backdrop for the concert. In addition, Simon tells viewers that she considerably shortened the concert for the first evening due to the cold, but performed the concert in its entirety the following evening. One of the missing songs can be found on both releases of the DVD as bonus footage.

The concert was first released on VHS, Betamax, and Laserdisc in 1988, all three editions are now out of print. A Region 1 DVD version was released on March 9, 2004 by Grandstand Entertainment, which quickly went out of print. Simon reissued the concert on May 11, 2010 under the Iris Records label as a Region All DVD, with no changes to the original cover art. This release also carried over the special features from the previous release.

== Track listing ==
All tracks composed by Carly Simon; except where indicated.

1. "Give Me All Night" (Simon, Gerard McMahon)
2. "Anticipation"
3. "You Have to Hurt" (Frank Musker, Dominic King)
4. "You're So Vain"
5. "Do the Walls Come Down" (Simon, Paul Samwell-Smith)
6. "Two Hot Girls (On a Hot Summer Night)"
7. "It Happens Everyday"
8. "Nobody Does It Better" (Carole Bayer Sager, Marvin Hamlisch)
9. "All I Want Is You" (Andy Goldmark, Simon)
10. "The Stuff That Dreams Are Made Of"
11. "You Belong to Me" (Simon, Michael McDonald)
12. "Coming Around Again/Itsy Bitsy Spider"
13. "Never Been Gone" (Simon, Jacob Brackman)
- Bonus track on CD soundtrack and DVD release, "The Right Thing to Do".

== Awards ==
Year	Award	Category	Work	Recipient(s)	Result	Ref.
1988	CableACE Awards	Performance in a Music Special	Live from Martha's Vineyard	Carly Simon	Nominated	
1988	CableACE Awards	Music Special	Live from Martha's Vineyard	Tommy Mottola, Al Smith, Brian Doyle	Nominated	

== Live album ==
Shortly after the concert aired, Arista released Greatest Hits Live, Simon's first live album. Gathered are 11 songs from the concert, out of the 14 performed, with a different running order. Omitted from the album are the tracks "Give Me All Night", "You Have to Hurt", and "The Stuff That Dreams Are Made Of", while "The Right Thing to Do", which didn't make it into the final televised cut of the concert, appears on the album. The audio was recorded by Michael Scott and David Hewitt on the Remote Recording Services' Black Truck. The album was a great commercial success, quickly going Gold, before being certified Platinum in 1996 for sales of over one million copies.
