= Give Me All Night =

Single by Carly Simon

from the album Coming Around Again
- B-side: "Sleight of Hand" (US); "Two Hot Girls" (UK)
- Released: 1987
- Genre: Soft rock
- Length: 4:23 (album version); 4:00 (single version)
- Label: Arista
- Songwriters: Carly Simon, Gerard McMahon

Carly Simon singles chronology
"Coming Around Again" (1986)	"Give Me All Night" (1987)	"The Stuff That Dreams Are Made Of" (1987)

"Give Me All Night" is the second single from Carly Simon's 13th studio album Coming Around Again (1987). The song was co-written by Simon with Gerard McMahon and produced by Paul Samwell-Smith. An accompanying music video was filmed on Martha's Vineyard and featured drummer Rick Marotta.

The song is one of Simon's biggest Adult contemporary hits, and has been included on multiple compilations of her work, such as the three-disc box set Clouds in My Coffee (1995), the UK import The Very Best of Carly Simon: Nobody Does It Better (1998), the two-disc retrospective Anthology (2002), the single-disc Reflections: Carly Simon's Greatest Hits (2004), and Sony Music's Playlist: The Very Best of Carly Simon (2014). Simon also performed the song on her 1987 HBO concert special Live from Martha's Vineyard.

The B-side, "Sleight of Hand," was written by Simon and Don Sebesky for John Pielmeier's 1987 Broadway play of the same name.

== Reception ==
"Give Me All Night" peaked at No. 61 on the Billboard Hot 100, becoming Simon's 21st entry on this chart, where it spent 12 weeks. It was even more successful on Billboard Adult Contemporary chart, peaking at No. 5 and charting for 17 weeks. The song was a minor hit in Canada, and charted at No. 87. It also charted in South Africa, peaking at No. 14, and in the UK, where it reached No. 98 for a single week.

Cash Box called it a "gentle and richly melodic ballad."

== Track listings and formats ==
7" single (US)

1. "Give Me All Night" – 3:56
2. "Sleight Of Hand" – 3:26

7" single (UK)

1. "Give Me All Night" – 4:02
2. "Two Hot Girls (On A Hot Summer Night)" – 4:51

== Personnel ==
- Carly Simon – lead vocals, backing vocals
- Peter-John Vettese – keyboards
- Hugh McCracken – guitars
- Tony Levin – bass
- Russ Kunkel – drums
- Frank Filipetti – LinnDrum
- Jimmy Bralower – percussion

== Charts ==
Chart (1987)	Peak position
Canada Top Singles (RPM)	87
South Africa (Springbok Radio)	14
US Billboard Hot 100	61
US Adult Contemporary (Billboard)	5
UK Singles (Official Charts)	98
Quebec (ADISQ)	41
European Airplay (European Hit Radio)	35
