= Barbara Markay =

American musician

Barbara Markay is an American musician. She was born and raised on Long Island, New York, in Rockville Centre. She was educated in piano and violin at Juilliard and the Manhattan School of Music and graduated from Juilliard with a bachelor's degree in composition. Moving from classical music to pop, she formed a five-part female singing group, The Girl Scouts, and later a musical theater troupe, Little Lulu & the Humpers, that performed in Miami Beach and New York City. With her own band she gained some commercial success in Europe with several singles in the Top 20 charts. Two of the singles, "It's All Rite to Fuck All Nite" and "Give Your Dick to Me", were heavily censored before receiving airplay. In the US she collaborated in various musical projects including Carly Simon's album Coming Around Again, Michael Jackson's Bad video and as a backup singer for Bruce Willis. Since 1994 she has been writing her own music in the world music and new-age genres.

== Albums ==
Year	Album
1976	Hot Box
1994	Change To Come
2000	Heart Like a Song
2005	Shambhala Dance
2005	Sophisticated High
2005	The Great Invocation
2008	Heaven and Earth
