= Vengeance (Carly Simon song) =

Single by Carly Simon

from the album Spy
- B-side: "Love You By Heart"
- Released: 1979
- Recorded: 1979
- Genre: Rock; disco
- Length: 4:14
- Label: Elektra
- Songwriter: Carly Simon
- Producer: Arif Mardin

Carly Simon singles chronology
"Devoted to You" (1978)	"Vengeance" (1979)	"Jesse" (1980)

"Vengeance" is a song written and performed by American singer-songwriter Carly Simon. Produced by Arif Mardin, the song served as the opening track and lead single from Simon's eighth studio album, Spy (1979).

Simon made a music video for the song, and she became the second female solo artist to be featured on MTV's first day of the air. MTV later used a clip from the video in a commercial to entice viewers to get stereo sound on their Television sets. The promotional clip was also chosen by Pioneer Electronics to be part of their first demo disc for its then-new LaserDisc player.

== Reception ==
Cash Box said that the song has "an urban rock feeling, with ominous guitar chording and touches of syndrums," saying that "Simon's vocals are...sharp and bold" but "less restrained than usual." The single was a moderate success on the Billboard Pop Singles chart, peaking right under the Top 40 at No. 48. It also hit No. 52 on the Cash Box top singles chart.

Simon received a Grammy Award nomination for Best Rock Vocal Performance, Female at the 1980—the first year to feature the new category. She included the track on her two-disc career compilation set Anthology (2002), as well as the three-disc special edition compilation Carly Simon Collector's Edition (2009).

== Track listing ==
7" single

- "Vengeance" – 4:14
- "Love You By Heart" – 3:55

== Charts ==
Chart (1979)	Peak Position
Australia (ARIA Charts)	90
Canada Top Singles (RPM)	97
US Billboard Hot 100	48

== Awards ==
Year	Award	Category	Work	Result	Ref.
1980	Grammy Awards	Best Rock Vocal Performance, Female	"Vengeance"	Nominated	
