= The Stuff That Dreams Are Made Of (song) =

Single by Carly Simon

from the album Coming Around Again
- B-side: "As Time Goes By" (US); "As Time Goes By" (UK)
- Released: 1987
- Genre: Soft rock
- Length: 5:00; 4:20 (single version)
- Label: Arista
- Songwriters: Carly Simon; Jacob Brackman

Carly Simon singles chronology
"Give Me All Night" (1987)	"The Stuff That Dreams Are Made Of" (1987)	"All I Want Is You" (1988)

"The Stuff That Dreams Are Made Of" is the third single from Carly Simon's 13th studio album Coming Around Again (1987). The song was written by Simon and produced by John Boylan. Though no official video was produced for the single, a clip of Simon performing the song at her 1987 HBO concert special Live from Martha's Vineyard was released and received moderate airplay on VH1.

The song is one of Simon's biggest Adult contemporary hits, and has been included on multiple compilations of her work, such as the three-disc box set Clouds in My Coffee (1995), the UK import The Very Best of Carly Simon: Nobody Does It Better (1998), the two-disc retrospective Anthology (2002), the single-disc Reflections: Carly Simon's Greatest Hits (2004), and Sony Music's Playlist: The Very Best of Carly Simon (2014).

The song title is derived from Humphrey Bogart's line in the 1941 Warner Bros. film The Maltese Falcon.

== Reception ==
"The Stuff That Dreams Are Made Of" peaked at No. 8 on the Billboard Adult Contemporary chart, where it charted for 17 weeks. The song also charted in Ireland, peaking at No. 28, and in the UK, where it reached No. 99 for a single week. In Canada, the single did not enter the RPM top singles chart, but it charted in the Adult Contemporary chart, reaching No. 1 on October 31, 1987.

== Track listings and formats ==
7" single (US)

1. "The Stuff That Dreams Are Made Of" (Single version) – 4:20
2. "As Time Goes By" – 5:06

7" single (UK)

1. "The Stuff That Dreams Are Made Of" – 3:58
2. "As Time Goes By" – 5:06

== Personnel ==
- Carly Simon – lead vocals, Yamaha DX7
- Rob Mounsey – acoustic piano, keyboard bass, string arrangements and conductor
- Jimmy Ryan – guitars
- Russ Kunkel – drums, drum machine
- David Nadien – concertmaster
- Timothy Wright Concert Choir – choir

== Charts ==
Chart (1987)	Peak position
Canada Adult Contemporary (RPM)	1
Ireland (Irish Singles Chart)	28
US Adult Contemporary (Billboard)	8
UK (UK Singles Chart)	99
Quebec (ADISQ)	33
