= Working Girl =

1988 film by Mike Nichols

- Theatrical release poster
- Directed by: Mike Nichols
- Written by: Kevin Wade
- Produced by: Douglas Wick
- Starring: Harrison Ford; Sigourney Weaver; Melanie Griffith
- Cinematography: Michael Ballhaus
- Edited by: Sam O'Steen
- Music by: Carly Simon; Rob Mounsey (score)
- Production company: 20th Century Fox
- Distributed by: 20th Century Fox
- Release date: December 21, 1988
- Running time: 113 minutes
- Country: United States
- Language: English
- Budget: $28 million
- Box office: $103 million

Working Girl is a 1988 American romantic comedy drama film directed by Mike Nichols, written by Kevin Wade, and starring Harrison Ford, Sigourney Weaver, and Melanie Griffith. Its plot follows an ambitious secretary from Staten Island working in mergers and acquisitions. The secretary, who has been going to business night school, pitches a profitable idea, only to have her new boss attempt to take credit. When her boss is laid up with a broken leg, she secretly takes over her boss's role to prove her capabilities in the corporate world.

The film's opening sequence follows Manhattan-bound commuters on the Staten Island Ferry accompanied by Carly Simon's song "Let the River Run", for which she received the Academy Award for Best Original Song and the Golden Globe Award for Best Original Song, and the Grammy Award for Best Song Written Specifically for a Motion Picture or Television, making her the first artist to win this trio of awards for a song composed and written, as well as performed, entirely by a single artist. The film was met with critical acclaim, and was a major box office success, grossing a worldwide total of $103 million.

Working Girl was nominated for six Academy Awards, including Best Picture, Best Director, and Best Actress for Griffith, while both Weaver and Joan Cusack were nominated for Best Supporting Actress. The film won four Golden Globes (from six nominations), including Best Motion Picture – Musical or Comedy, Best Actress – Musical or Comedy for Griffith, and Best Supporting Actress for Weaver. It also received three BAFTA nominations: Best Actress for Griffith, Best Supporting Actress for Weaver, and Best Original Score for Simon.

== Plot ==
Tess McGill is a working-class woman from Staten Island who dreams of climbing the corporate ladder to an executive position. Having earned a business degree via night school, she works as a secretary at a stockbroker firm in lower Manhattan. Her boss and male co-workers treat her like a bimbo, despite benefiting from her intelligence and business instincts. After one humiliation too many from her scornful boss (he fixes her up with a rival executive, who only wants to do cocaine and have sex), Tess retaliates by posting on a VDT what she thinks of him and of what he has done. This greatly amuses Tess's colleagues, but also gets her fired.

Shortly thereafter, Tess lands another job, this time as an administrative assistant to Katharine Parker, an associate partner at the mergers-and-acquisitions firm Petty Marsh. At first, Katharine seems supportive of Tess, encouraging her to share ideas. Eventually, however, she insists that Tess's proposed purchase of a radio network by Trask Industries would not work out.

When Katharine breaks her leg skiing, she asks Tess to house-sit. At her apartment, Tess finds meeting notes which reveal Katharine's intention to pass off the Trask Industries idea as her own. Returning home, Tess finds her live-in boyfriend cheating and dumps him. At work, she uses her hospitalized boss's connections to push the Trask proposal forward. With help from her friend Cyn, Tess gives herself a makeover, borrowing from Katharine's stylish wardrobe to look more professional.

Tess schedules a meeting with Jack Trainer, a mergers-and-acquisitions associate from another company. The night before, she substitutes for Katharine at a dinner hosted by Trainer's firm. Trainer is attracted to Tess, and approaches her at the bar. Yet he does not reveal his name, even after she asks directly whether he knows the man she is slated to meet with (himself). He brings Tess to his apartment, after she passes out in a cab from a combination of Valium and alcohol.

Tess leaves early the next day, believing that they slept together. Arriving for her meeting with Trainer and his associates, she is surprised to recognize him from the previous night. They both feign non-recognition. After the meeting, Tess worries that her deal has failed, until Jack arrives at Tess's office. He assures her that they did not sleep together, and that he wants to move forward with her idea.

Together, they prepare the financials for her merger proposal, which they present successfully to Trask. Tess and Jack celebrate by giving in to their attraction, ending up in bed. Afterward, Tess discovers that Jack has been involved with Katharine, but had been planning to break up with her when she went skiing and got injured.

Katharine returns home on the day of the merger meeting. While Tess is helping her get settled, Katharine brings up the Trask merger, claiming she was intent on taking it to Jack, and on eventually giving Tess credit for it. Katharine adds that Jack's strict ethical code has prevented him from looking at another's ideas without verifying the source, ever since he was accused of stealing himself.

Jack arrives in response to a call from Katharine, who unsuccessfully tries to seduce him. Tess avoids running into him at Katharine's apartment, but accidentally leaves her notebook before she departs for the meeting. Katharine discovers Tess's deception after finding the notebook, which includes Jack's phone numbers and the scheduled merger meeting.

At the meeting, Tess brings up what Katharine told her about Jack's ethical code, and about his being accused of stealing. Jack insists that it was all a lie. Then Katharine crashes the meeting and outs Tess as her secretary. She accuses Tess of stealing the Trask merger idea. Unable to defend herself, Tess apologizes profusely and leaves.

Tess returns to Petty Marsh a day later, intent on cleaning out her desk. Instead she encounters Jack, Katharine, Trask, and members of Trask's board. Jack sticks up for Tess, who points out a news item which presents a possible risk to the merger's success. In an elevator pitch she explains to Trask what inspired her plan for his radio acquisition. He then confronts Katharine, who is fired when she is unable to explain where Tess's plan came from.

Tess is rewarded with a new job at Trask Industries, expecting it to be another executive assistant post, and moves in with Jack. On her first day, she mistakes an assistant named Alice for her new supervisor. Alice explains that she is actually Tess's secretary. Tess makes it very clear that she considers Alice a colleague, thus proving herself very different from Katharine. At the first opportunity, Tess calls Cyn from her new office, telling her that she has made it.

== Cast ==
- Melanie Griffith as Tess McGill
- Harrison Ford as Jack Trainer
- Sigourney Weaver as Katharine Parker
- Alec Baldwin as Mick Dugan
- Joan Cusack as Cynthia
- Philip Bosco as Oren Trask
- Zach Grenier as Jim
- Timothy Carhart as Tim Draper
- Nora Dunn as Ginny, a colleague of Katharine's
- Oliver Platt as David Lutz, Tess's first boss
- James Lally as Turkel
- Kevin Spacey as Bob Speck, a cokehead arbitrageur
- Robert Easton as Armbrister
- Amy Aquino as Alice Baxter, Tess's secretary
- Olympia Dukakis as personnel director
- Ricki Lake as Bridesmaid
- David Duchovny as Tess's birthday party friend
- Elizabeth Whitcraft as Doreen, Mick's new girlfriend

== Production ==
=== Development ===
Screenwriter Kevin Wade was inspired to write the screenplay after visiting New York City in 1984 and witnessing throngs of career women walking through the streets in tennis shoes while carrying their high-heels.

=== Casting ===
Melanie Griffith read the screenplay for Working Girl over a year before the production began, and expressed interest in playing the role of Tess McGill. Approximately a year later, Mike Nichols agreed to direct the film after reading the screenplay while shooting his film Biloxi Blues in Arkansas. Following Nichols's attachment, Griffith had a formal audition for the role. Molly Ringwald auditioned but was deemed "too young." Nichols was so determined for Griffith to have the part that he threatened to drop out of the production if the studio, 20th Century Fox, would not hire her.

Following the casting of Sigourney Weaver and Harrison Ford—both major stars at that point—the studio agreed to cast Griffith, as they felt Weaver and Ford's involvement gave them a higher chance of box-office success.

=== Filming ===
Principal photography of Working Girl began on February 16, 1988, in New York City. Many scenes were shot in the New Brighton section of Staten Island in New York City. One half-day of shooting to complete the skiing accident scene took place in New Jersey. Four different buildings portrayed the offices of Petty Marsh—1 State Street Plaza; the Midday Club, which served as the company's club room; the lobby of 7 World Trade Center (one of the buildings destroyed in the September 11 attacks); and the reading floor of the L. F. Rothschild Building. One Chase Manhattan Plaza was featured at the end of the film as the Trask Industries building. Filming completed on April 27, 1988, with the final sequence being shot on the Staten Island Ferry.

Throughout the shoot, Griffith was in the midst of struggling with a years-long alcohol and cocaine addiction, which at times interfered with the shoot. "There were a lot of things that happened on Working Girl that I did that were not right," Griffith recalled in 2019. "It was the late '80s. There was a lot going on party-wise in New York. There was a lot of cocaine. There was a lot of temptation." After Nichols realized that Griffith had arrived on set high on cocaine, the shoot was temporarily shut down for 24 hours. Griffith elaborated on the experience:

Mike got so mad at me, he wouldn't talk to me. Mike Haley, the first [assistant director], just came up and said, "We're shutting down. Go home", and I knew I was in so much trouble. … The next morning he (Nichols) took me to breakfast and said, "Here's what's going to happen. You're going to pay for last night out of your pocket. We're not going to report you to the studio, but you have to pay for what it cost", and it was $80,000. They wanted to get my attention and they really did. It was a very humbling, embarrassing experience, but I learned a lot from it.

Three weeks after filming was completed, Griffith entered a rehabilitation facility to receive treatment for her addiction. Ironically, according to the biography Mike Nichols: A Life, written by Mark Harris, Nichols had been battling a cocaine addiction of his own around the same time.

=== Music ===
The film's main theme "Let the River Run" was written, arranged, and performed by American singer-songwriter Carly Simon, and won her an Academy Award, a Golden Globe Award, and a Grammy Award for Best Original Song, making Simon the first artist to win this trio of awards for a song written, as well as performed, entirely by a single artist. As a single, "Let the River Run" reached No. 49 on the U.S. Billboard Hot 100 and No. 11 on the Billboard Adult Contemporary chart in early 1989.

The film's additional soundtrack was scored by Simon and Rob Mounsey. The soundtrack album was released by Arista Records on August 29, 1989, and peaked at No. 45 on the Billboard 200.

== Release ==
=== Box office ===
The film was released in the United States and Canada on December 21, 1988, in 601 theaters before expanding to 608 theaters on Friday, December 23; 1,046 theaters on Christmas Day; and 1,051 on Monday, December 26. It grossed $4.7 million in its opening four-day weekend and $5.6 million in its first 6 days. It went on to gross $63.8 million in the United States and Canada and $39.2 million in the rest of the world for a worldwide total of $103 million.

=== Home media ===
Working Girl was released on VHS and Laserdisc in 1989 by CBS/Fox Video; "Family Portrait", one of the shorts from The Tracey Ullman Show featuring The Simpsons, was included before the movie on the VHS release. The film was released on DVD on April 17, 2001, by 20th Century Fox Home Entertainment. Special features included two theatrical trailers and three TV spots. The film was released on Blu-ray on January 6, 2015. The special features from the DVD release were carried over for the Blu-ray release.

== Reception ==
=== Critical response ===
Working Girl received critical acclaim upon release. On the review aggregator website Rotten Tomatoes, 85% of 47 critics' reviews are positive, with an average rating of 7/10. The website's consensus reads: "A buoyant corporate Cinderella story, Working Girl has the right cast, right story, and right director to make it all come together." Metacritic, which uses a weighted average, assigned the film a score of 73 out of 100, based on 13 critics, indicating "generally favorable" reviews. Audiences polled by CinemaScore gave the film an average grade of "A−" on an A+ to F scale.

Chicago Sun-Times film critic Roger Ebert gave the film four out of four stars and wrote, "The plot of Working Girl is put together like clockwork. It carries you along while you're watching it, but reconstruct it later and you'll see the craftsmanship". In her review for the Washington Post, Rita Kempley described Melanie Griffith as "luminous as Marilyn Monroe, as adorable as one of Disney's singing mice. She clearly has the stuff of a megastar, and the movie glows from her". Janet Maslin, in her review for The New York Times, wrote, "Mike Nichols, who directed Working Girl, also displays an uncharacteristically blunt touch, and in its later stages the story remains lively but seldom has the perceptiveness or acuity of Mr. Nichols's best work". In his review for Time, Richard Corliss wrote, "Kevin Wade shows this in his smart screenplay, which is full of the atmospheric pressures that allow stars to collide. Director Mike Nichols knows this in his bones. He encourages Weaver to play (brilliantly) an airy shrew. He gives Ford a boyish buoyancy and Griffith the chance to be a grownup mesmerizer".

The February 2020 issue of New York Magazine lists Working Girl as among "The Best Movies That Lost Best Picture at the Oscars."

=== Accolades ===
Award	Category	Nominee(s)	Result	Ref.
Academy Awards	Best Picture	Douglas Wick	Nominated	
Academy Awards	Best Director	Mike Nichols	Nominated	
Academy Awards	Best Actress	Melanie Griffith	Nominated	
Academy Awards	Best Supporting Actress	Joan Cusack	Nominated	
Academy Awards	Best Supporting Actress	Sigourney Weaver	Nominated	
Academy Awards	Best Original Song	"Let the River Run"; Music and Lyrics by Carly Simon	Won	
American Comedy Awards	Funniest Actress in a Motion Picture (Leading Role)	Melanie Griffith	Nominated	
American Comedy Awards	Funniest Supporting Actress in a Motion Picture	Joan Cusack	Won	
Artios Awards	Outstanding Achievement in Feature Film Casting – Comedy	Juliet Taylor	Won	
Boston Society of Film Critics Awards	Best Actress	Melanie Griffith	Won	
Boston Society of Film Critics Awards	Best Supporting Actress	Joan Cusack (also for Married to the Mob and Stars and Bars)	Won	
British Academy Film Awards	Best Actress in a Leading Role	Melanie Griffith	Nominated	
British Academy Film Awards	Best Actress in a Supporting Role	Sigourney Weaver	Nominated	
British Academy Film Awards	Best Original Film Score	Carly Simon	Nominated	
Chicago Film Critics Association Awards	Best Supporting Actress	Sigourney Weaver	Nominated	
Directors Guild of America Awards	Outstanding Directorial Achievement in Motion Pictures	Mike Nichols	Nominated	
Golden Globe Awards	Best Motion Picture – Musical or Comedy		Won	
Golden Globe Awards	Best Actress in a Motion Picture – Musical or Comedy	Melanie Griffith	Won	
Golden Globe Awards	Best Supporting Actress – Motion Picture	Sigourney Weaver	Won	
Golden Globe Awards	Best Director – Motion Picture	Mike Nichols	Nominated	
Golden Globe Awards	Best Screenplay – Motion Picture	Kevin Wade	Nominated	
Golden Globe Awards	Best Original Song – Motion Picture	"Let the River Run"; Music and Lyrics by Carly Simon	Won (Note: Tied with Phil Collins and Lamont Dozier for "Two Hearts".)	
Grammy Awards	Best Song Written Specifically for a Motion Picture or Television	"Let the River Run"; Music and Lyrics by Carly Simon	Won	
National Society of Film Critics Awards	Best Actress	Melanie Griffith	3rd Place	
New York Film Critics Circle Awards	Best Actress	Melanie Griffith	Runner-up	
Writers Guild of America Awards	Best Screenplay – Written Directly for the Screen	Kevin Wade	Nominated	

=== Honors ===
The film is recognized by American Film Institute in these lists:

- 2002: AFI's 100 Years...100 Passions – No. 91
- 2004: AFI's 100 Years...100 Songs:
  - "Let the River Run" – No. 91
- 2006: AFI's 100 Years...100 Cheers – No. 87

== In other media ==
=== Television ===
Working Girl was also made into a short-lived NBC television series in 1990, starring Sandra Bullock as Tess McGill. It lasted 12 episodes.

=== Theatre ===
A Broadway musical version was in the works as of 2017, with a score to be written by Cyndi Lauper from Fox Stage Productions and Aged in Wood Productions. For Aged in Wood, the producers were Robyn Goodman and Josh Fiedler. Instead of a production company on Working Girl, the musical adaptation was switched to a license production by Aged in Wood Productions since Disney took over ownership of Fox Stage in 2019. The show premiered at the La Jolla Playhouse in November 2025.

A stage musical adaptation of the film was a central plot point in the first episode of Bob's Burgers season 5.

=== Reboot ===
In 2022 a reboot of Working Girl was reported to be in development at Hulu, with Ilana Peña adapting the script. Selena Gomez was in talks to produce.

== Sources ==
- Carter, Ash; Kashner, Sam (2019). Life Isn't Everything: Mike Nichols, As Remembered By 150 of His Closest Friends. New York: Henry Holt and Company. ISBN 978-1-250-11286-6.
