= Romulus Hunt: A Family Opera =

Carly Simon's opera album with bonus track

Studio album by Carly Simon
- Released: November 16, 1993
- Studios: Right Track Recording and The Hit Factory (New York City, New York)
- Genre: Opera
- Length: 63:36
- Label: Angel
- Producers: Frank Filipetti; Teese Gohl

Carly Simon chronology
This Is My Life (Music from the Motion Picture) (1992)	Romulus Hunt: A Family Opera (1993)	Letters Never Sent (1994)

Professional ratings
Review scores
Source	Rating
AllMusic	2/5 stars

Romulus Hunt: A Family Opera is an album written and composed by American singer-songwriter Carly Simon, released by Angel Records, on November 16, 1993.

The singing on the album is performed by a cast of five. Simon does appear at the end of the album, performing "Voulez-Vous Danser" as a bonus track.

== History ==
Simon was jointly commissioned by the Metropolitan Opera Association and the Kennedy Center to write a contemporary opera that would appeal to younger people. She came up with Romulus Hunt, named after its 12-year-old protagonist. It is a family opera about divorce. Romulus tries to trick his divorced, ill-matched parents into coming back together. His sidekick is an imaginary Rastafarian named Zoogy who knows enough Jamaican magic to help with the plot. Eddie, Rom's father, is an artsy type who pierces his son's nose, while his prim mother, Joanna, worries more about propriety. A triangle is created by Mica, Eddie's girlfriend, a ditsy performance artist. During the show's final minutes Eddie learns to love Rom by recalling his own father's indifference.

== Revival ==
In December 2014, the Nashville Opera Association premiered a new performance edition of the opera.

== Track listing ==
All tracks are written by Carly Simon.

No.	Title	Length
1.	"Introduction (Voulez-Vous Danser)"	1:04
2.	"Looser Arms"	3:54
3.	"Valentine Aria"	3:11
4.	"A Boy Of Twelve"	5:47
5.	"Man With Wings"	3:49
6.	"My Dance Is A Tango"	4:38
7.	"Voulez-Vous Danser"	1:39
8.	"Fond of the Blondes"	2:26
9.	"It's My Downfall"	4:35
10.	"Incantation"	3:22
11.	"The Fight"	5:14
12.	"The Jig"	1:25
13.	"Am I Still Young?"	3:25
14.	"It's Such A Glorious Day"	0:53
15.	"Seduction Aria"	2:50
16.	"Romulus Hunt (The Nightmare)"	2:30
17.	"Where Am I?"	1:29
18.	"It Almost Happens On Its Own (We'll Never Leave)"	3:07
19.	"Eddie's Soliloquy"	3:43
20.	"Voulez-Vous Danser"	1:16
21.	"Voulez-Vous Danser" (Bonus Track)"	3:11
Total length:		63:28

== Credits ==
Musicians

- Carly Simon – acoustic guitar, vocals (21)
- Warren Bernhardt – acoustic piano
- Jeff Bova – keyboards
- Tesse Gohl – acoustic piano, keyboards
- Michael Kosarin – acoustic piano
- Richard Martinez – keyboards
- Bill Mays – acoustic piano
- Jay Berliner – guitars
- Jeff Pevar – guitars
- Sergio Brandão – bass
- Jimmy Bralower – drums
- Cyro Baptista – percussion
- Gordon Gottlieb – percussion
- Michael Brecker – EWI

String section

- Emile Charlap – string contractor
- John Beal – string bass
- Timothy Cobb – string bass
- Semyon Fridman – cello
- Jesse Levy – cello
- Charles McCracken – cello
- Emily Mitchell – harp
- Lamar Alsop – viola
- Leonard Davis – viola
- Richard Sortomme – viola
- Elena Barere – violin, concertmaster
- Israel Chorberg – violin
- Cenobia Cummings – violin
- Guillermo Figueroa – violin
- Barry Finclair – violin
- Charles Libove – violin
- Paul Peabody – violin
- John Pintavalle – violin
- Matthew Raimondi – violin

Performers

- Luretta Bybee as Joanna (2, 4, 7–9, 11–15, 17, 18)
- Jeff Hairston as Zoogy (2–4, 6, 10, 11, 14–18)
- Wendy Hill as Mica (2, 4–6, 11, 14, 18)
- Andrew Leeds as Rom (2–4, 6–8, 11, 17–20)
- Kurt Ollmann as Eddie (2, 4, 6, 11–15, 19, 20)

Production

- Tesse Gohl – producer, arrangements
- Frank Filipetti – producer, engineer, mixing
- Louis Alfred III – assistant engineer
- Jim Militsher – assistant engineer
- Joe Pirrera – assistant engineer
- Ted Jensen – mastering at Sterling Sound (New York, NY)
- Jill Dell'Abate – production coordinator
- Greg Pliska – arrangements
- Jacob Brackman – story
- Carly Simon – story
- Emil Micha – lettering
- Bob Gothard – photography
