= Heartburn (novel) =

1983 novel by Nora Ephron

- Author: Nora Ephron
- Language: English
- Genre: Literary fiction
- Publisher: Alfred A. Knopf
- Publication date: March 12, 1983
- Publication place: United States
- Pages: 179
- ISBN: 978-0679767954

Heartburn is an autobiographical novel based on Nora Ephron's marriage to and divorce from Carl Bernstein, her second husband. Originally published in 1983, the novel draws inspiration from events arising from Bernstein's affair with Margaret Jay, the daughter of former British prime minister James Callaghan. Ephron also wrote the screenplay for the 1986 film adaptation.

The novel is a vivid depiction of the breakdown of a marriage. Its strong autobiographical content provides insight into one of the "power couples" of the late 1970s. It is Nora Ephron's first published novel but in it she mentions subjects that she would go on to feature in future work such as When Harry Met Sally... and Julie & Julia.

== Plot ==
The narrator of the novel is Rachel Samstat (based on Nora Ephron), a food writer who is married to Mark Feldman (based on Carl Bernstein), a political journalist. Rachel is a Jewish New Yorker who has moved to Washington, D.C., to support her husband's career. They have one son, Sam, and Rachel is pregnant with their second child as the book begins. The book wittily describes the life of an upper middle class intellectual couple replete with neuroses—Rachel is in group therapy, Mark agonizes over the mystifying disappearance of his socks. Threaded through the whole are recipes and anecdotes which drive the story along and humanize Samstat.

Rachel's self-esteem takes a huge battering as Mark has an affair with Thelma Rice (based on Margaret Jay) and she takes her revenge by telling the Washington grapevine that Thelma has a venereal disease.

Rachel's diamond ring, given to her by Mark after the birth of their first son and stolen from her while at group therapy, is pivotal to the plot. Remarkably she gets it back when the police catch the robber. The stone is loose in its setting and she takes it back to the family jeweler for repair. Here she discovers that while she had been in the hospital giving birth, Mark had bought an expensive necklace for his lover Thelma. She sells the ring and the money enables her to go back to New York and start afresh.

== Reception ==
In a New Yorker piece on novels that include recipes, Adam Gopnik writes, "in Heartburn, the recipes serve both as a joke about what a food writer writing a novel would write and as a joke on novel-writing itself by someone who anticipates that she will not be treated as a 'real' novelist."
