= Let the River Run =

Single by Carly Simon

from the album Working Girl (Original Soundtrack Album)
- B-side: "The Turn of the Tide"; "Carlotta's Heart" (Europe)
- Released: 1989
- Recorded: 1988
- Genre: Gospel; pop; rock
- Length: 3:43
- Label: Arista
- Songwriter: Carly Simon
- Producers: Rob Mounsey; Carly Simon

Carly Simon singles chronology
"All I Want Is You" (1987)	"Let the River Run" (1989)	"Better Not Tell Her" (1990)

"Let the River Run" is a song written, composed, and performed by American singer-songwriter Carly Simon, and the theme to the 1988 Mike Nichols film Working Girl.

The song won the Academy Award for Best Original Song, the Golden Globe Award for Best Original Song (tying with "Two Hearts" by Phil Collins and Lamont Dozier from Buster), and the Grammy Award for Best Song Written Specifically for a Motion Picture or Television. Simon became the first artist in history to win this trio of awards for a song composed and written, as well as performed, entirely by a single artist.

The Working Girl soundtrack was released in 1989 and peaked at No. 45 on the Billboard 200, and also contains a choral version of the track featuring The St. Thomas Choir of Men and Boys of New York City.

== Composition and reception ==
Simon has stated that she found inspiration for the lyrics by first reading the original script, and then the poems of Walt Whitman. Musically, she wanted to write a hymn to New York with a contemporary jungle beat under it, so as to juxtapose those opposites in a compelling way. A statement on Simon's official website acknowledges that "the phrases 'Silver Cities Rise' and 'The New Jerusalem' seem to have taken on a new meaning for many people, but the song was not originally composed with any particular political and/or religious overtones." The phrase "new Jerusalem" has been recognized by other observers as an allusion to the works of William Blake, although Simon denied the song has any explicit relationship with religion. The song incorporates elements of gospel, pop and rock.

A music video for the song was filmed and released, featuring Simon, along with Working Girl actresses Melanie Griffith and Joan Cusack, aboard the Staten Island Ferry. As a single, the song reached peak positions of No. 49 on the Billboard Hot 100 and No. 11 on the Billboard Adult Contemporary chart in 1989. The song remains one of Simon's best loved and most recognizable hits, and has been featured on multiple compilations of her work, including the three-disc box set Clouds in My Coffee (1995), the UK import The Very Best of Carly Simon: Nobody Does It Better (1998), the two-disc retrospective Anthology (2002), the single-disc Reflections: Carly Simon's Greatest Hits (2004), and Sony Music's Playlist: The Very Best of Carly Simon (2014).

Cash Box said that it "is perhaps the most powerful songwriting Simon has ever done. A broken drum feel underscores a brilliant anthem for the working class. The gospel-tinged melody soars, inspires; the lyric conjures visions of a nation only needing to let the river of hope run its course. Simon delivers a remarkable vocal, filled with passionate intensity."

== Awards ==
Simon became the first artist in history to win a Grammy Award, a Golden Globe Award, and an Academy Award for a song composed and written, as well as performed, entirely by a single artist.

Year	Award	Category	Recipient	Result	Ref.
1989	Academy Awards	Best Original Song	Carly Simon	Won	
1989	Golden Globe Awards	Best Original Song	Carly Simon	Won	
1989	Boston Music Awards	Outstanding Song/Songwriter	Carly Simon	Nominated	
1990	British Academy Film Awards	Best Film Music	Carly Simon	Nominated	
1990	Grammy Awards	Best Song Written Specifically for a Motion Picture or Television	Carly Simon	Won	

== Legacy ==
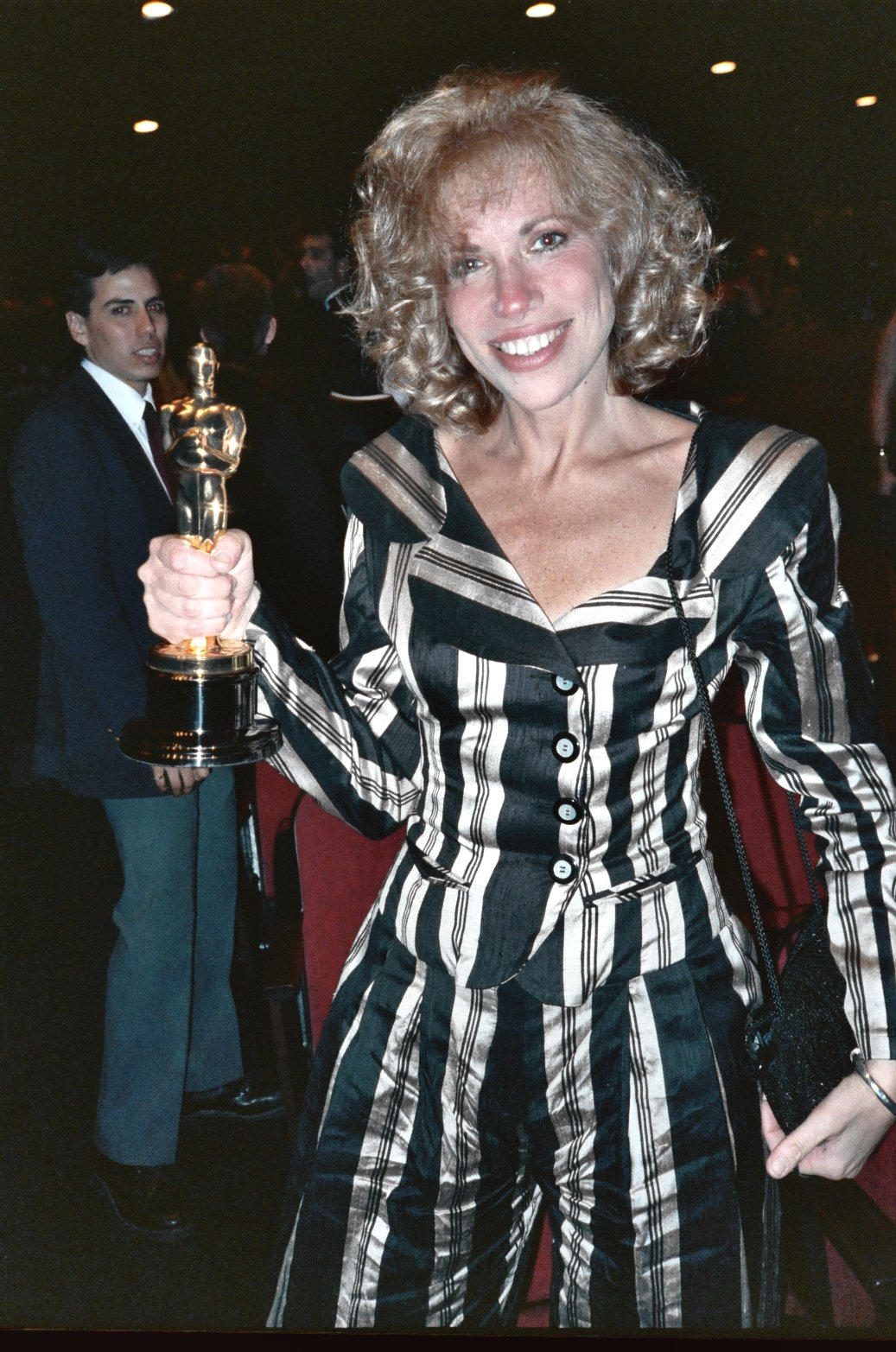
Simon at the 61st Academy Awards (March 1989).

"Let the River Run" is the first of only two songs to have won the three most significant American film and recording industry awards (Oscar, Golden Globe, Grammy) while being composed and written, as well as performed, entirely by a single artist—the other being "Streets of Philadelphia" by Bruce Springsteen from Philadelphia.

"Let the River Run" gained a deeper meaning for many listeners after the September 11 attacks. The line "Silver cities rise" could now be interpreted as a reference to the Twin Towers, which were featured on the song's music video, as well as the opening scene of Working Girl. The song was used for a Christmastime advertisement for the United States Postal Service in the wake of 9/11 and the 2001 anthrax attacks. Acknowledging its association with the attacks and New York City, Simon performed the song with her children, Sally and Ben Taylor, during the September 11 memorial service at Ground Zero in 2009.

In 2004, the song was twice featured in the film Little Black Book, Simon herself also appeared at the end of the film. That same year, the song was ranked at No. 91 in AFI's 100 Years...100 Songs.

In 2009, Simon re-recorded the song for her album Never Been Gone.

In 2014, Simon released a single of the song covered by Máiréad Carlin and Damian McGinty which had been the anthem for Derry~Londonderry's UK City of Culture celebrations. McGinty and Carlin sang the song with Simon during the Oceana Partners Awards Gala in Beverly Hills, Ca.

In January 2019, the song was the subject of an episode of BBC Radio 4's Soul Music, examining the song's cultural influence.

In October 2019, the song was used behind the closing credits of Season 31, Episode 2 of the Fox TV show The Simpsons.

Also in October 2019, as well as being the episode title, the song was used during several key moments during the first episode of Season 2 of Castle Rock.

== Track listing ==
7" single

- "Let The River Run" – 3:40
- "The Turn Of The Tide" – 4:04

== Personnel ==
- Vivian Cherry - vocals (background)
- Kacey Cisyk - vocals (background)
- Mickey Curry - drums
- Frank Filipetti - mixing
- Frank Floyd - vocals (background)
- Gordon Grody - vocals (background)
- Lani Groves - vocals (background)
- Tim Leitner - engineer
- Rob Mounsey - keyboards, producer
- Jimmy Ryan - guitar
- Frank Simms - vocals (background)
- Carly Simon - producer, vocals
- Vaneese Thomas - vocals (background)
- Kurt Yaghjian - vocals (background)

== Charts ==
=== Weekly charts ===
Chart (1989)	Peak position
Australia (ARIA Charts)	91
Canada Top Singles (RPM)	50
Iceland (Íslenski Listinn Topp 10)	6
Italy Airplay (Music & Media)	7
UK Singles Chart (Official Charts Company)	79
US Billboard Hot 100	49
US Billboard Adult Contemporary	11
