= Coming Around Again (album) =

Studio album by Carly Simon
- Released: April 13, 1987
- Recorded: 1986–1987
- Studios: Right Track Recording, The Power Station, Pin Wheel Studio, Unique Recording Studios and Flying Monkey (New York City); Cliffhanger Studio (Vancouver, Canada)
- Genres: Rock; soft rock
- Length: 47:22
- Label: Arista
- Producers: Clive Davis (exec.); Bryan Adams; John Boylan; Frank Filipetti; Russ Kunkel; George Massenburg; Rob Mounsey; Bill Payne; Richard Perry; Paul Samwell-Smith

Carly Simon chronology
Spoiled Girl (1985)	Coming Around Again (1987)	Greatest Hits Live (1988)

Singles from Coming Around Again
- 1. "Coming Around Again" Released: August 1986; 2. "Give Me All Night" Released: 1987; 3. "The Stuff That Dreams Are Made Of" Released: 1987; 4. "All I Want Is You" Released: 1987

Coming Around Again is the 13th studio album by American singer-songwriter Carly Simon, released by Arista Records, on April 13, 1987.

The first of many albums Simon recorded for Arista; the title track was written for and featured in the 1986 film Heartburn, along with "Itsy Bitsy Spider". As a single, "Coming Around Again" became a worldwide hit; it peaked at No. 18 on the US Billboard Hot 100 (becoming Simon's 12th Top 40 hit), No. 5 on the Billboard Adult Contemporary chart, and No. 10 in the UK. The album itself reached No. 25 in both the US and the UK. It was certified Silver by the British Phonographic Industry (BPI) in September 1987, and Platinum by the Recording Industry Association of America (RIAA) in February 1988. The album spawned three more Top 10 Adult Contemporary hit singles; "Give Me All Night", "The Stuff That Dreams Are Made Of", and "All I Want Is You" (which features Roberta Flack on backing vocals), and features a cover of "As Time Goes By" with Stevie Wonder on harmonica.

In June 1987, a live outdoor concert was recorded on a specially built stage in the town of Gay Head. In front of an invited audience, Simon and her band performed eight songs from the album, as well as some of her greatest hits. It was broadcast on HBO as Carly Simon – Coming Around Again, and later released on home video as Live From Martha's Vineyard. It was also released as a live album in 1988 titled Greatest Hits Live.

On October 27, 2017, Hot Shot Records released a 30th Anniversary deluxe edition of the album. The two-disc set includes six bonus tracks, including a 12" extended remix of the single "Give Me All Night" and the Oscar winning "Let the River Run", along with a second disc consisting of Simon's aforementioned Greatest Hits Live album. An in-depth interview with Simon is also included in the albums booklet.

== Reception ==
Professional ratings
Review scores
Source	Rating
AllMusic	3/5 stars

Rolling Stone gave a positive review of the album, writing: "The title cut on Coming Around Again gives Simon the chance to step away and deliver a cozy, soothing, even hopeful song. The song sets the mood for the entire album. Many of the tracks progress with the same slow, tuneful strides and reflect Carly's new lyrical stance — that of an older sister or mother. In most cases, this would mean instant death with younger listeners, but Carly pulls it off, because her voice stays cool and confident. Maybe all those years of avoiding the road have paid off for her; while the other acoustic heroines of the 1970s — Carole King, Judy Collins, Joni Mitchell — have frayed at the edges, Carly's voice still sounds like it's in one piece. That's why it's not such a silly idea for her to cover a song like "As Time Goes By," which, if she doesn't redefine, she at least renews with some zephyrous overtones," concluding "Coming Around Again is a strong reminder of how refreshing a diversion Carly Simon can be".

Stephen Holden, writing for The New York Times, stated: "Coming Around Again, the latest and one of the strongest chapters in a growing catalogue, embodies everything that the 41-year-old singer-songwriter does best. Of all the confessional singer-songwriters who emerged out of the 60's counterculture to confide their personal feelings in recorded pop song cycles, she has been one of only a handful to sustain a major label recording career of such a duration. And of that handful, she has stayed the closest to the personal confessional mode." He also singled out the track "Two Hot Girls (On a Hot Summer Night)"; "along with the title tune, the album's most haunting cut is a song of adolescent memory titled "Two Hot Girls" in which the singer remembers competing with a friend for the attentions of a boy and losing. Like "Coming Around Again", "Two Hot Girls" is quintessential Carly Simon. Blunt, succinct and catchy on the surface, underneath it is psychologically complex.

People was also positive, stating: "Simon remains perhaps the most interesting of women pop singers. This album proves she is still captivating." A retrospective review from AllMusic stated: "On the surface, this hit album had a lot in common with [Spoiled Girl]. The big difference was that Simon was willing to go to her strengths as a ballad singer rather than romping amid synthesized blips." Awarding the album 3-out-of-5-stars, they also singled out the tracks "Coming Around Again", "Give Me All Night", "The Stuff That Dreams Are Made Of", and "All I Want is You".

== Awards ==
Year	Award	Category	Work	Result	Ref.
1987	Grammy Awards	Best Recording for Children	"Itsy Bitsy Spider"	Nominated	
1988	Grammy Awards	Best Pop Vocal Performance, Female	Coming Around Again	Nominated	

== Track listing ==
Credits adapted from the album's liner notes.

No.	Title	Writer(s)	Length
1.	"Coming Around Again"	Carly Simon	3:38
2.	"Give Me All Night"	Simon; Gerard McMahon	4:20
3.	"As Time Goes By"	Herman Hupfeld	5:06
4.	"Do the Walls Come Down"	Simon; Paul Samwell-Smith	3:48
5.	"It Should Have Been Me"	Bryan Adams; Jim Vallance	4:20
6.	"The Stuff That Dreams Are Made Of"	Simon	5:01
7.	"Two Hot Girls (On a Hot Summer Night)"	Simon	4:51
8.	"You Have to Hurt"	Frank Musker; Dominic King	4:04
9.	"All I Want Is You"	Simon; Andy Goldmark; Jacob Brackman	3:58
10.	"Hold What You've Got"	Simon; Joe Tex	4:40
11.	"Itsy Bitsy Spider"	Simon (based on the original nursery rhyme)	3:40
Total length:			46:26

Bonus tracks on 2017 special edition
No.	Title	Writer(s)	Length
12.	"Raining"	Simon	3:12
13.	"The Wives Are in Connecticut"	Simon	4:30
14.	"If it Wasn't Love"	Patrick Leonard; Kathleen Wakefield	4:17
15.	"Let the River Run"	Simon	3:43
16.	"Sleight of Hand"	Simon; Don Sebesky	3:28
17.	"Give Me All Night (12" Extended Remix)"	Simon; McMahon	5:43
Total length:			71:19

== Personnel ==
=== Musicians ===
- Carly Simon – vocals, keyboards (1, 11), arrangements (3, 11), acoustic piano (4), Yamaha DX7 (6)
- Scott Martin – keyboards (1)
- Bill Payne – keyboards (1, 11)
- Peter-John Vettese – keyboards (2, 7)
- Rob Mounsey – MIDI piano (3), bass programming (3), drum programming (3), acoustic piano (6), keyboard bass (6)
- Paul Samwell-Smith – E-mu Emulator (4), LinnDrum (4)
- Dave Pickell – keyboards (5)
- Robbie Kilgore – keyboards (8, 9), keyboard programming (8), synth bass (9)
- Chuck Kentis – additional keyboards (8), string synthesizer (8)
- Andy Goldmark – keyboards (9), drum machine (9)
- Leon Pendarvis – synthesizers (10), arrangements (10)
- Barbara Markay – synthesizer programming (10)
- Hugh McCracken – guitars (2, 7), tiple (8)
- Jimmy Ryan – guitars (3, 6, 8)
- Keith Scott – guitars (5)
- John McCurry – acoustic guitar (9)
- Tom "T-Bone" Wolk – guitars (10)
- Tony Levin – bass (2, 7)
- Dave Taylor – bass (5)
- Neil Jason – bass (8)
- Russ Kunkel – drums (1–4, 6, 10, 11), drum machine (6)
- Frank Filipetti – LinnDrum (2, 7), drum machine programming (8)
- Mickey Curry – drums (5)
- Jimmy Bralower – percussion (2, 4), drum machine programming (8)
- Jimmy Maelen – percussion (9)
- Stevie Wonder – harmonica (3)
- Michael Brecker – EWI (4), saxophone (7)

Background vocalists

- Terri Homberg – backing vocals (1)
- Scott Martin – backing vocals (1)
- Carly Simon – backing vocals (1, 2, 4, 7, 10)
- Paul Samwell-Smith – backing vocals (1, 4, 8)
- Jimmy Ryan – backing vocals (4, 7, 8)
- Lucy Simon – backing vocals (4, 7)
- Peter-John Vettese – backing vocals (4)
- Marc LaFrance – backing vocals (5)
- Timothy Wright Concert Choir – choir (6)
- Caz Lee – backing vocals (8)
- Will Lee – backing vocals (8)
- Roberta Flack – backing vocals (9)
- Gordon Grody – backing vocals (10)
- Lani Groves – backing vocals (10)
- Janice Pendarvis – backing vocals (10)
- Alexandra Taylor – backing vocals (11)
- Ben Taylor – backing vocals (11)
- Isaac Taylor – backing vocals (11)
- Sally Taylor – backing vocals (11)

Strings (Tracks 3, 6 & 9)

- Rob Mounsey – string arrangements and conductor
- David Nadien – concertmaster
- Warren Lash, Beverly Lauridsen, Richard Locker, Carol McCracken and Charles McCracken – cello
- Lamar Alsop, Julien Barber, Theodore Israel, Carol Landon and Sue Pray – viola
- Marin Alsop, Lewis Eley, Barry Finclair, Regis Iandiorio, Harry Lookofsky, Jan Mullen, John Pintavalle, Matthew Raimondi, Richard Sortomme, Marti Sweet and Gerald Tarack – violin

=== Production ===
- Clive Davis – executive producer
- Russ Kunkel – producer (1, 6, 11)
- George Massenburg – producer (1, 11)
- Bill Payne – producer (1, 11)
- Paul Samwell-Smith – producer (1, 2, 4, 7, 8)
- Frank Filipetti – associate producer (1–5, 7–11)
- Carly Simon – associate producer (1–5, 7–11)
- Rob Mounsey – producer (3)
- Bryan Adams – producer (5)
- John Boylan – producer (6, 9)
- Richard Perry – producer (10)
- Gina Silvester – production coordinator
- Steven Shmerler – creative direction
- Howard Fritzson – art direction
- Margery Greenspan – design
- Lynn Goldsmith – photography
- Tommy Mottola – management, direction

Technical credits

- Ted Jensen – mastering at Sterling Sound (New York, NY)
- Frank Filipetti – engineer (1–4, 6–10), mixing (1–4, 6, 8, 10, 11)
- George Massenburg – engineer (1, 11)
- Richard Alderson – engineer (3)
- Bryan Adams – engineer (5)
- Tim Crich – engineer (5)
- Neil Dorfsman – engineer (5)
- Bob Clearmountain – mixing (5)
- Chris Lord-Alge – engineer (8, 9), mixing (9)
- Ed Stasium – engineer (8)
- Bill Miranda – engineer (9)
- Leon Pendarvis – engineer (10)
- Scott Mabuchi – assistant engineer
- Noah Baron – assistant engineer (1, 11)
- Bill Miranda – assistant engineer (1, 2, 4, 7, 11)
- Michael Christopher – assistant engineer (5)
- Debra Cornish – assistant engineer (6)
- Jeff Lord-Alge – assistant engineer (9)

== Charts ==
=== Weekly charts ===
Chart (1987)	Peak position
Australian Albums (Kent Music Report)	24
Austrian Albums (Ö3 Austria)	17
Canada Top Albums/CDs (RPM)	57
Dutch Albums (Album Top 100)	25
European Albums (Music & Media)	19
Finnish Albums (Suomen virallinen lista)	25
German Albums (Offizielle Top 100)	32
Italian Albums (Musica e dischi)	22
Swedish Albums (Sverigetopplistan)	29
Swiss Albums (Schweizer Hitparade)	21
UK Albums (Official Charts)	25
US Billboard 200	25
US Cash Box Top 200 Albums	34

=== Year-end charts ===
Chart (1987)	Position
US Billboard 200	58

== Certifications ==
Region	Certification	Certified units/sales
Brazil	—	80,000
Canada (Music Canada)	Platinum	100,000^{^}
United Kingdom (BPI)	Silver	60,000^{^}
United States (RIAA)	Platinum	1,000,000^{^}
^{^} Shipments figures based on certification alone.
