= Working Girl (soundtrack) =

Working Girl (Original Soundtrack Album)

Soundtrack album by Carly Simon
- Released: August 29, 1989
- Genre: Soundtrack
- Length: 37:09
- Label: Arista
- Producer: Rob Mounsey, Carly Simon

Carly Simon chronology
Greatest Hits Live (1988)	Working Girl (Original Soundtrack Album) (1989)	My Romance (1990)

Singles from Working Girl (Original Soundtrack Album)
- 1. "Let the River Run" Released: 1989

Professional ratings
Review scores
Source	Rating
AllMusic	3/5 stars

Working Girl (Original Soundtrack Album) is the soundtrack album to the 1988 Mike Nichols film Working Girl, released by Arista Records, on August 29, 1989.

The film's main theme, "Let the River Run", was composed, written, and performed by American singer-songwriter Carly Simon. The film's additional soundtrack was scored by Simon and Rob Mounsey.

The album peaked at No. 45 on the Billboard 200. As a single, "Let the River Run" reached peak positions of No. 49 on the Billboard Hot 100, and No. 11 on the Billboard Adult Contemporary chart in early 1989.

== Awards ==
Simon became the first artist in history to win a Grammy Award, a Golden Globe Award, and an Academy Award for a song composed, written, and performed entirely by a single artist.

Year	Award	Category	Work	Recipient	Result	Ref
1989	Academy Awards	Best Original Song	"Let the River Run"	Carly Simon	Won	
1989	Golden Globe Awards	Best Original Song	"Let the River Run"	Carly Simon	Won	
1989	Boston Music Awards	Outstanding Song/Songwriter	"Let the River Run"	Carly Simon	Nominated	
1990	British Academy Film Awards	Best Film Music	"Let the River Run"	Carly Simon	Nominated	
1990	Grammy Awards	Best Song Written Specifically for a Motion Picture or Television	"Let the River Run"	Carly Simon	Won	
1990	Grammy Awards	Best Arrangement, Instrumental and Vocals	"Calotta's Heart"	Don Sebesky (performed by Carly Simon)	Nominated	

== Track listing ==
Credits adapted from the album's liner notes.

Working Girl Original Soundtrack Album track listing
No.	Title	Writer(s)	Performer(s)	Length
1.	"Let the River Run"	Carly Simon	Carly Simon	3:40
2.	"In Love" (instrumental)	Simon	Carly Simon	3:55
3.	"The Man That Got Away" (instrumental)	Harold Arlen; Ira Gershwin	Rob Mounsey; George Young; Chip Jackson; Grady Tate	2:48
4.	"The Scar" (instrumental)	Simon	Carly Simon	1:22
5.	"Let the River Run"	Simon	The St. Thomas Choir of Men and Boys	3:01
6.	"Lady in Red"	Chris de Burgh	Chris de Burgh	4:16
7.	"Carlotta's Heart"	Simon	Carly Simon	4:18
8.	"Looking Through Katherine's House"	Simon	Carly Simon	2:07
9.	"Poor Butterfly" (instrumental)	John L. Golden; Raymond Hubbell	Sonny Rollins	6:04
10.	"I'm So Excited"	Anita Pointer; June Pointer; Ruth Pointer; Trevor Lawrence	Pointer Sisters	5:39
Total length:				37:09

== Personnel ==
- Arnie Acosta – mastering (6)
- Gary Barnacle – saxophone (6)
- John Barnes – acoustic piano (10)
- Tony Beard – drums (6)
- Dick Beetham – assistant engineer (6)
- Art Blakey – drums (9)
- Michael Boddicker – synthesizer programming (10)
- Dave Brubaker – design
- Paul Chambers – bass (9)
- Steve Chase – assistant engineer (6)
- Vivian Cherry – backing vocals (1)
- Kacey Cisyk – backing vocals (1)
- Mickey Curry – drums (1)
- Paulinho da Costa – percussion (10)
- Chris de Burgh – lead vocals (6), guitar (6)
- George Doering – guitar (10)
- Sue Evans – percussion (8)
- Frank Filipetti – mixing (1)
- Chuck Findley – trumpet (10)
- Frank Floyd – backing vocals (1)
- John Giblin – bass (6)
- Nick Glennie-Smith – keyboards (6)
- Gary Grant – trumpet (10)
- Gordon Grody – backing vocals (1)
- Lani Groves – backing vocals (1)
- Gerre Hancock – vocal conductor (5)
- Paul Hardiman – engineer (6), producer (6)
- Gary Herbig – reeds (10)
- Jim Horn – reeds (10)
- Dick Hyde – trombone (10)
- Chip Jackson – bass (3)
- J.J. Johnson – trombone (9)
- Robbie Kilgore – guitar (8)
- Ian Kojima – saxophone (6)
- Jamie Lawrence – synthesizer (7)
- Trevor Lawrence – associate producer (10), horn arrangements (10), rhythm arrangements (10)
- Bradshaw Leigh – engineer (2, 3, 4, 7, 8), mixing (2–5, 7, 8)
- Tim Leitner – engineer (1)
- Alfred Lion – producer (9)
- Chris Lord-Alge – engineer (5)
- Stephen Marcussen – mastering (10)
- Al Marnie – bass (6)
- Danny McBride – guitar (6)
- Ron McMaster – digital transfers (9)
- Thelonious Monk – acoustic piano (9)
- Glenn Morrow – keyboards (6)
- Rob Mounsey – producer (1, 3, 4, 5, 8), keyboards (1), acoustic piano (3), string arrangements and conductor (4), vocal arrangements (5), synthesizer (8)
- Yuji Muraoka – liner notes
- Pino Palladino – bass (6)
- Phil Palmer – guitar (6)
- Richard Perry – producer (10), rhythm arrangements (10)
- Greg Phillinganes – synthesizer (10)
- Jeff Phillips – drums (6)
- Anita Pointer – lead and backing vocals (10)
- June Pointer – backing vocals (10)
- Ruth Pointer – backing vocals (10)
- Andy Richards – keyboards (6)
- Lee Ritenour – guitar (10)
- John "J.R." Robinson – drums (10)
- Sonny Rollins – tenor saxophone (9)
- Jimmy Ryan – guitar (1, 8)
- Bill Schnee – remix (10)
- Don Sebesky – orchestral arrangements and conductor (2, 7), synthesizer (7)
- Horace Silver – acoustic piano (9)
- Frank Simms – backing vocals (1)
- Carly Simon – lead vocals (1, 7, 8), producer (1, 2, 4, 5, 7, 8)
- Harold Sinclair – photography
- Pamela Sklar - flute
- William D. "Smitty" Smith – organ (10)
- St. Thomas Choir of Men and Boys – vocals (5, 8)
- Grady Tate – drums (3)
- Vaneese Thomas – backing vocals (1)
- Rudy Van Gelder – engineer (9)
- Peter Van Hooke – drums (6)
- Gabe Veltri – engineer (10)
- Nathan Watts – bass (10)
- Kurt Yaghjian – backing vocals (1)
- George Young – tenor saxophone (3)

Additional Credits

- Tracks 1, 2, 4, 5, 7 & 8 recorded and mixed at The Hit Factory and Flying Monkey Studio (New York, NY).
- Track 6 recorded at The Manor (Oxford, UK) and Marcus Recording Studios (London, England).
- Track 10 recorded at Studio 55 (Los Angeles, CA).

== Charts ==
Chart (1989)	Peak position
US Billboard 200	45
US Cash Box Top 200 Albums	58
