= Itsy Bitsy Spider =

Nursery rhyme

"Itsy Bitsy Spider" singing game

"The Itsy Bitsy Spider" (also known as "The Incey Wincey Spider" in Australia or "Incy Wincy Spider" in the United Kingdom, "The Eensy Weensy Spider" in other versions, and other anglophone countries) is a popular nursery rhyme, folksong, and fingerplay that describes the adventures of a spider as it ascends, descends, and re-ascends the downspout or "waterspout" of a gutter system or open-air reservoir. It is usually accompanied by a sequence of gestures that mimic the words of the song. Its Roud Folk Song Index number is 11586.

== Lyrics ==
A commonly used version uses these words and gestures:

Words

The itsy bitsy spider climbed up the waterspout.
Down came the rain
And washed the spider out.
Out came the sun
And dried up all the rain
And the itsy bitsy spider climbed up the spout again.

Fingerplay

Alternately touch the thumb of one hand to the index finger of the other.
Hold both hands up and wiggle the fingers as the hands are lowered.
Sweep the hands from side to side.
Raise both hands and sweep to the sides to form a semicircle as the sun.
Wiggle fingers upwards.
(As in the first line)

Other versions exist.

== History ==
The exact origin for the song "Itsy Bitsy Spider" is unknown. The song is sung by and for children in countless languages and cultures.

It is similar to the melodies (metric line) of the children's songs "Sweetly Sings the Donkey" in the United States, and "Auf der Mauer, auf der Lauer" (1890) ("On the wall, on the lurk"), "Ich bin ein kleiner Esel" ("I'm a little donkey", the German-language version of "Sweetly Sings the Donkey") and "Spannenlanger Hansel" (1838) (see: Hansel and Gretel) in German-speaking countries.

In 1910, the song was published in a book by Arthur Walbridge North (1874–1943), Camp and Camino in Lower California, a record of the adventures of the author while exploring peninsular California, Mexico, where it is referred to as (the classic) "Spider Song".

In 1912, a version reported to have been heard at an Indiana college commencement resembles the common modern version:

There was a blooming spider
Went up a blooming spout,
And down came the rain
And washed the spider out;
Out came the sun
And dried up all the rain,
But that bloody, blooming son of a gun
Went up that spout again.

In 1948, one of the song's several modern versions appeared in Western Folklore, by the California Folklore Society (1948), and in Ruth Crawford Seeger's, American Folk Songs for Children (1948).

== Score ==
Source

== Legacy ==
The British broadcaster Wincey Willis (1948–2024) took her name from the nursery rhyme. Born Florence Winsome Leighton, she went by her middle name, Winsome; but at infant school her classmates started calling her Wincey after the nursery rhyme, and she retained this name in adult life.

Arnold Silcock included a parody in Cockney dialect, "The Bleed'n' Sparrer", in his 1952 compilation Verse and Worse.

In the 2002 film Spider-Man, the villain Green Goblin (Willem Dafoe) sings an altered version of the rhyme, with himself replacing the rain, while confronting Spider-Man.
