= Nobody Does It Better =

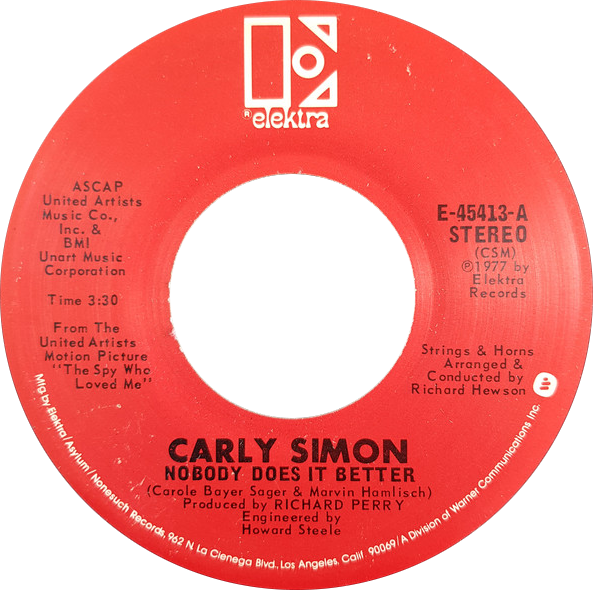
- A-side label of the US single

Single by Carly Simon

from the album The Spy Who Loved Me
- B-side: "After the Storm"
- Released: July 1977
- Recorded: April 1977
- Genre: Pop rock
- Length: 3:29
- Label: Elektra
- Composer: Marvin Hamlisch
- Lyricist: Carole Bayer Sager
- Producer: Richard Perry

Carly Simon singles chronology
"Half a Chance" (1976)	"Nobody Does It Better" (1977)	"You Belong to Me" (1978)

James Bond theme singles chronology
"The Man With The Golden Gun" (1974)	"Nobody Does It Better" (1977)	"Moonraker" (1979)

Official audio
- "Nobody Does It Better" on YouTube

Audio sample
- file; help

"Nobody Does It Better" is a power ballad and the theme song for the James Bond film The Spy Who Loved Me (1977). Composed by Marvin Hamlisch with lyrics by Carole Bayer Sager, the song was produced by Richard Perry and performed by Carly Simon. It was the first Bond theme song to be titled differently from the name of the film since Dr. No (1962), although the phrase "the spy who loved me" is included in the lyrics. The song was released as a single from the film's soundtrack album, and became a major worldwide hit.

Among the most successful Bond themes, the song spent three weeks at No. 2 on the US Billboard Hot 100, kept out of the top spot by Debby Boone's "You Light Up My Life". It hit No. 1 on the Billboard Easy Listening chart, where it stayed for seven weeks, becoming the No. 1 Adult Contemporary hit of 1977. The song was certified gold by the RIAA, signifying sales of one million copies in the US. It also reached No. 7 on the UK Singles Chart, and was certified silver by the BPI. The song received Academy Award and Golden Globe Award nominations for Best Original Song in 1978, losing both to "You Light Up My Life" from the 1977 film of the same title. At the 20th Annual Grammy Awards held in 1978, "Nobody Does It Better" received a nomination for Song of the Year, and Simon was nominated for Best Pop Vocal Performance, Female.

In 2004, "Nobody Does it Better" was honoured by the American Film Institute as the 67th greatest film song as part of their 100 Years Series. In 2012, Rolling Stone ranked it the third-greatest James Bond theme song, while Billboard ranked it the second-greatest. In 2021, USA Today crowned "Nobody Does it Better" the greatest James Bond theme song. The song has been performed live by Celine Dion and Radiohead, whose lead singer, Thom Yorke, called it the "sexiest song ever written".

== Background and composition ==
"Nobody Does It Better" is Carly Simon's longest-charting hit, as well as the most successful hit of hers that she did not write herself. Her earlier hit "You're So Vain" spent three weeks at No. 1; however, its chart run was two months shorter than that of "Nobody Does It Better". The title of the theme was later used for Simon's 1998 greatest hits compilation, The Very Best of Carly Simon: Nobody Does It Better.

Lyrically, "Nobody Does It Better" is a "lust-drunk anthem" about James Bond (Roger Moore)'s sexual prowess. In a 1977 documentary on the making of The Spy Who Loved Me, Marvin Hamlisch said that the decision to ask Simon to perform the song was made after lyricist Carole Bayer Sager remarked that the lyrics sounded "incredibly vain", in reference to Simon's 1972 song "You're So Vain".

== Reception ==
Billboard described "Nobody Does It Better" as a "typically inventive and bombastic" James Bond theme song, stating that Simon sings it "as if she believed sincerely in the superhuman love powers of 007." Cash Box said that it is "strictly star material in every detail" and that it has "a good enough melody to stand on its own," even if it wasn't a James Bond theme song.

== Accolades ==
Year	Award	Category	Recipient(s)	Result	Ref.
1978	Academy Awards	Best Original Song	Marvin Hamlisch and Carole Bayer Sager	Nominated	
1978	British Academy Film Awards	Best Film Music	Marvin Hamlish	Nominated	
1978	Golden Globe Awards	Best Original Song	Marvin Hamlisch and Carole Bayer Sager	Nominated	
1978	Grammy Awards	Song of the Year	Marvin Hamlisch and Carole Bayer Sager	Nominated	
1978	Grammy Awards	Best Pop Vocal Performance, Female	Carly Simon	Nominated	

== Track listing ==
7" single

- "Nobody Does It Better" – 3:30
- "After the Storm" – 2:46

== Chart performance ==
=== Weekly charts ===
Chart (1977–1978)	Peak position
Argentina	4
Australia (Kent Music Report)	8
Canadian RPM Adult Contemporary	1
Canada Top Singles (RPM)	2
France	5
Ireland	1
Norway	5
Quebec (ADISQ)	3
UK Singles (Official Charts)	7
US Billboard Hot 100	2
US Adult Contemporary (Billboard)	1
U.S. Cash Box Top 100	2
West Germany (GfK)	31

=== Year-end charts ===
Chart (1977)	Rank
Canadian RPM Top Singles	35
UK Singles Chart	49
US Billboard Hot 100	83
US Billboard Adult Contemporary	1
US Cash Box Top 100	14

Chart (1978)	Rank
Australia (Kent Music Report)	39

== Certifications ==
Region	Certification	Certified units/sales
United Kingdom (BPI)	Silver	250,000^{^}
United States (RIAA)	Gold	1,000,000^{^}
^{^} Shipments figures based on certification alone.

== See also ==
- James Bond music
- Outline of James Bond
