= Frank Filipetti =

American record producer, audio engineer and mixer

- Born: Bristol, Connecticut
- Origin: United States
- Occupations: Record producer; audio engineer; mixer

Frank Filipetti is an American record producer, audio engineer, and mixer who was born in Bristol, Connecticut. Filipetti has seven Grammy Awards and ten nominations for his work on The Color Purple, The Book of Mormon, Wicked, Monty Python's Spamalot and Elton John and Tim Rice's Aida. He was an early supporter of digital recording.

His credits include mixes for such number one singles as Foreigner's "I Want to Know What Love Is" and The Bangles' "Eternal Flame." Filipetti engineered and produced Survivor's 1988 album, Too Hot to Sleep. Filipetti also recorded and mixed albums for Carly Simon, Barbra Streisand, Vanessa Williams, George Michael, 10,000 Maniacs, Korn, McAuley Schenker Group, Frank Zappa, and James Taylor, whose Hourglass Filipetti produced, engineered, and mixed, eventually winning two more Grammy Awards in 1998 for Best Engineered Album and Best Pop Album.

A proponent of surround sound, Filipetti has made nine 5.1/DVD projects, including works for Billy Joel, Carly Simon, James Taylor, and Meat Loaf. He has recorded and mixed numerous live albums, including the Pavarotti and Friends series, 1999's Minnelli on Minnelli: Live at the Palace, James Taylor's Live at the Beacon and most recently, Elton John's One Night Only. He also recorded original cast albums for A Funny Thing Happened on the Way to the Forum featuring Nathan Lane, the Grammy-winning Annie Get Your Gun and 2000's Tony Award-winning Aida, among others.

Filipetti lives in Waterford.
