= In Harmony (compilation albums) =

Two compilation albums of children's music

In Harmony: A Sesame Street Record

Compilation album by Various Artists
- Released: October 1980
- Genre: Children's
- Label: Warner Bros.
- Producers: Lucy Simon; David Levine

Professional ratings
Review scores
Source	Rating
AllMusic	4.5/5 stars

In Harmony: A Sesame Street Record and In Harmony 2 are two compilation albums of children's music performed by various artists, released in 1980 and 1981, respectively.

Of the two albums, only the first album charted, reaching No. 156 on the Billboard 200. The Doobie Brothers' cover of "Wynken, Blynken, and Nod" was the only single release to chart, when it reached No. 76 on the Billboard Hot 100 singles chart. A second single, Al Jarreau's "One Good Turn", failed to chart. The first album was released on Sesame Street Records through Warner Bros. Records, and is the only album in the series with a direct connection to the popular children's series Sesame Street, as it includes a song performed by the characters Ernie and Cookie Monster. The second album was released on Columbia Records, and while no Muppet-related content appears on the album, the credits state that a "royalty is being donated to the Children's Television Workshop and various children's charities" from its proceeds. Each album won the Grammy Award for Best Recording for Children, at the 23rd Annual Grammy Awards and 25th Annual Grammy Awards, respectively. The Grammys were awarded to the producers, David Levine and Lucy Simon.

Bruce Springsteen's performance of "Santa Claus Is Comin' to Town", which appears on the second album, was recorded live at C. W. Post College in Brookville, New York on December 12, 1975. Springsteen's rendition of the song has received radio airplay perennially at Christmastime for years; it has appeared on Billboard magazine's Hot Singles Recurrents chart each year from 2002 to 2009 due to seasonal airplay. In Harmony 2 marks the first appearance of the recording on an album, although it was later released as the B-side of Springsteen's single "My Hometown" in 1985 and has since been released on several other compilations.

== In Harmony: A Sesame Street Record ==
=== Track listing ===
No.	Title	Writer(s)	Length
1.	"Wynken, Blynken, and Nod" (The Doobie Brothers)	Eugene Field (poem); Lucy Simon (music)	3:19
2.	"Jellyman Kelly" (James Taylor)	James Taylor; Sarah Taylor	2:20
3.	"Be With Me" (Carly Simon)	Carly Simon	1:55
4.	"Blueberry Pie" (Bette Midler)	Bette Midler; Bruce Roberts; Carole Bayer Sager	2:57
5.	"Share" (Ernie and Cookie Monster)	Joe Raposo	3:04
6.	"One Good Turn" (Al Jarreau)	Al Jarreau	3:56
7.	"I Want a Horse" (Linda Ronstadt and Wendy Waldman)	Linda Ronstadt; Wendy Waldman	3:14
8.	"The Sailor and the Mermaid" (Libby Titus and Dr. John)	Jacob Brackman; Libby Titus	3:35
9.	"Pajamas" (Livingston Taylor)	Livingston Taylor; Maggie Taylor	1:50
10.	"A Friend for All Seasons" (George Benson and Pauline Wilson)	Cheryl Hardwick	3:17
11.	"I Have a Song" (Lucy Simon)	Norman Martin; Lucy Simon	2:39
12.	"In Harmony" (Kate Taylor and The Simon/Taylor Family)	Lorraine Alterman Boyle; Anne Riophe; Lucy Simon	3:46

=== Personnel ===
Musicians

- Jonathan Abramowitz – strings (11, 12)
- Alex Acuña – drums (6)
- Sanford Allen – strings (11, 12)
- Wayne Andre – horns and reeds (12)
- Stanley Banks – bass (10)
- Jeff Baxter – pedal steel guitar (7)
- George Benson – guitar (10)
- Warren Bernhardt – keyboards (11)
- Jay Berliner – guitar (5)
- Lynn Blessing – vibraphone (6)
- Laura Brannigan – hand claps (6)
- Samanthan Broun – children's chorus (6)
- Timothy Broun – children's chorus (6)
- Al Brown – strings (11, 12)
- Cornelius Bumpus – flute and saxophone (1)
- John Campo – horns and reeds (12)
- Tom Canning – piano (6)
- Ron Carter – bass (9)
- Lennox Church – hand claps (6)
- Bob Cranshaw – bass (5)
- George Devens – percussion (5)
- Jimmy Douglass – hand claps (6)
- Kenny Edwards – bass (4, 7, 8)
- Steve Ferrone – drums (5)
- Sammy Figueroa – percussion (2, 11, 12)
- Barry Finclair – strings (11, 12)
- Steve Gadd – drums (2, 3, 11, 12)
- Maureen Gallagher – strings (11, 12)
- Al Gorgoni – guitar (12)
- Sara Gorham – children's chorus (6)
- Don Grolnick – keyboards (3, 12)
- Tom Heid – hand claps (6)
- Amy Helm – children's chorus (6, 8)
- L. Marlo Henderson – guitar (6, 8)
- Jim Henson – Ernie (5)
- Timothy "Ace" Holleran – drums (4, 7)
- Craig Hull – guitar (4, 7)
- Anthony Jackson – bass (1)
- Al Jarreau – vocals (6)
- Arthur Jenkins – keyboards (5)
- Jim Keltner – drums (8)
- Jinee Kim – children's chorus (6)
- Mike Lawrence – horns and reeds (12)
- Jeff Layton – guitar (5)
- John McFee – violin (1)
- Keith Knudsen – drums (1)
- Tony Levin – bass (2, 3, 11, 12), tuba (2)
- James Levine – cookie cruncher (5), children's chorus (8)
- Julie Levine – cookie cruncher (5), children's chorus (6, 8)
- Tony Lewis – drums (10)
- Arif Mardin – hand claps (6)
- George Marge – horns and reeds (12)
- Chet McCracken – percussion (1)
- Michael McDonald – vocals and keyboards (1)
- Sid McGinnis – guitar (11)
- Earl McIntyre – horns and reeds (12)
- David Nadien – strings (11, 12)
- Jeffrey Oliveros – children's chorus (6)
- Jennifer Oliveros – children's chorus (6)
- Frank Oz – Cookie Monster (5)
- Gregory Phillinganes – acoustic piano and arp string ensemble (10)
- Robert Popwell – bass (6)
- Tony Posk – strings (11, 12)
- Tony Price – tuba (4), horns and reeds (12)
- Nick Raposo – children's chorus (6)
- Mac "Dr. John" Rebennack – piano and tack piano (4), keyboards (8)
- Bruce Roberts – background vocals (4), arrangements (4)
- Barry Rogers – horns and reeds (12)
- Ora Shiram – strings (11, 12)
- Pat Simmons – vocals and guitar (1)
- Carly Simon – background vocals (1, 12), harmony vocals (3)
- Joanna Simon – background vocals (12)
- Lucy Simon – background vocals (1, 4, 8, 12), harmony vocals (3, 11), hand claps (6)
- Lewis Soloff – horns and reeds (12)
- Richard Sortomme – strings (11, 12)
- David Spinozza – guitar (3, 9, 11, 12), arrangements and conducting (11, 12)
- Sally Stevens – background vocals and soprano obligato (8)
- David Stone – children's chorus (6)
- Sooky Kim Streiff – children's chorus (6)
- Hugh Taylor – background vocals (12)
- James Taylor – guitar (2, 3), background vocals (2, 12)
- Kate Taylor – lead vocal (12)
- Livingston Taylor – guitar (9), background vocals (12)
- Dave Tofani – horns and reeds (12)
- Phil Upchurch – guitar (10)
- Randy Waldman – electric piano and synthesizer (10)
- Wendy Waldman – piano (7), background vocals (4)
- The Watts Double Rock Baptist Church Junior Choir – children's chorus (6)
- Larry Williams – synthesizer (6)
- Susan Winterbottom – strings (11, 12)
- Cengic Yaltkaya – additional scoring (12)

Technical and artistic personnel

- Lucy Simon – producer
- David Levine – producer
- Arthur Shimkin – executive producer
- Lew Hahn – associate producer, engineer (2, 3, 5, 9, 11, 12), mixing
- Michael Boshears – engineer (4, 6–8, 10)
- Gene Paul – engineer (1)
- Tom Greto – additional engineering (2, 12)
- George Marino – mastering
- Bill Dooley – assistant engineer (1–3, 5, 9, 11, 12)
- Tom Heid – assistant engineer (1–3, 5, 9, 11, 12)
- Randy Mason – assistant engineer (1–3, 5, 9, 11, 12)
- Michael O'Reilly – assistant engineer (1–3, 5, 9, 11, 12)
- Anthony D'Amico – assistant engineer (4, 6–8, 10)
- Glenn Feit, Jr. – assistant engineer (4, 6–8, 10)
- Chip Leach – assistant engineer (4, 6–8, 10)
- Skip Saylor – assistant engineer (4, 6–8, 10)
- Peter Whorf – art direction
- Simon Levy – design
- Julie Levine – cover illustration
- James Levine – hand lettering

=== Charts ===
Album – Billboard (United States)

Year	Chart	Position
1980	Billboard 200	156

== In Harmony 2 ==
In Harmony 2

Compilation album by Various Artists
- Released: November 1981
- Genre: Children's music
- Label: Columbia
- Producers: Lucy Simon; David Levine

=== Track listing ===
No.	Title	Writer(s)	Length
1.	"Nobody Knows But Me" (Billy Joel)	Billy Joel	2:54
2.	"Sunny Skies" (James Taylor)	James Taylor	2:46
3.	"The Owl and the Pussycat" (Lou Rawls and Deniece Williams)	Edward Lear (poem); Lucy Simon (music)	3:49
4.	"Reach Out and Touch (Somebody's Hand)" (Teddy Pendergrass)	Nickolas Ashford; Valerie Simpson	4:21
5.	"Ginny the Flying Girl" (Janis Ian)	Janis Ian	3:46
6.	"Here Comes the Rainbow" (Crystal Gayle)	Jacques Levy (words); Lucy Simon (music)	3:40
7.	"Splish Splash" (Dr. John)	Bobby Darin; Murray Kaufman	4:17
8.	"Some Kitties Don't Care" (Kenny Loggins)	Kenny Loggins; Marty Paich	4:03
9.	"Maryanne" (Carly and Lucy Simon)	arranged by: Lucy Simon; Carly Simon	3:10
10.	"Santa Claus Is Comin' to Town" (Bruce Springsteen)	J. Fred Coots; Haven Gillespie	4:29

=== Personnel ===
Musicians

- Joe Allen – bass (6)
- Errol "Crusher" Bennett – percussion (2, 3, 6, 9)
- Jay Berliner – acoustic guitar (9)
- David Brown – guitar and background vocals (7)
- Ron Carter – bass (2, 9)
- Lenny Castro – percussion (5)
- Clarence Clemons – saxophone, bells, and background vocals (10)
- Charles Cochran – piano (6), rhythm track arrangements (6)
- John Crowder – bass and background vocals (5)
- Ronnie Cuber – baritone saxophone (3)
- Robin Danar – background vocals (7)
- Liberty DeVitto – drums (1, 7), percussion (1), background vocals (7)
- Arti Dixson – drums (5)
- George Doening – acoustic guitar (4)
- Danny Federici – organ and glockenspiel (10)
- Dan Ferguson – electric guitar (5)
- Larry Franke – background vocals (7)
- Arti Funaro – acoustic guitar and background vocals (5)
- Crystal Gayle – background vocals (6)
- Sarah Gorham – background vocals (4)
- Annie Gwathmey – background vocals (4)
- David Hungate – bass (8)
- Janis Ian – piano and background vocals (5)
- Anthony Jackson – bass (3)
- Paul Jackson, Jr. – electric guitar (4)
- Neil Jason – bass (7)
- Russell Javors – acoustic guitar (1)
- Billy Joel – electric piano and harmonica (1)
- Steve Khan – electric guitar and cowbell (1)
- Jeffrey Lefcourt – background vocals (4)
- Chris Leuzinger – acoustic and electric guitars (6)
- James Levine – background vocals (4)
- Jamie Levine – background vocals (8)
- Julie Levine – background vocals (4, 8)
- Kenny Loggins – acoustic guitar (8)
- Steve Lukather – acoustic guitar (8)
- Tom Malone – trombone (3)
- George Marge – English horn (9)
- Dave Matthews – string arrangements (6)
- Charles McCracken – cello (9)
- Hugh McCracken – acoustic guitar (2, 3, 9)
- Charlie Miller – trumpet and flute (3), arrangements (3)
- Rob Mounsey – Fender Rhodes (2, 9)
- David Nadien – concertmaster (6)
- Tony Newman – drums (6)
- Marty Paich – piano (8), rhythm track and string arrangements (8)
- Greg Phillinganes – Fender Rhodes (5, 8)
- Robert Popwell – bass (4)
- Jeffrey Porcaro – drums (8)
- Mac "Dr. John" Rebennack – all keyboards (3), arrangements (3), piano and background vocals (7)
- John Robinson – drums (4)
- Sid Sharp – concertmaster (8)
- Lucy Simon – background vocals (6)
- Bruce Springsteen – guitar (10)
- Doug Stegmeyer – bass (1)
- Alan Steinberger – synthesizer and Fender Rhodes (6)
- Fred Tackett – acoustic guitar (5)
- Garry Tallent – bass (10)
- Ben Taylor – background vocals (2)
- James Taylor – acoustic guitar (2)
- Sarah Maria Taylor – background vocals (2, 8)
- Sandy Van Der Zee – background vocals (4)
- Steve Van Zandt – guitar and background vocals (10)
- Max Weinberg – drums (10)
- Buddy Williams – drums (3)
- Larry Williams – Fender Rhodes (4)
- Jai Winding – piano, synthesizer, and B-3 (4)
- Edward Xiques – tenor saxophone and flute (3)

Technical and artistic personnel

- Lucy Simon – producer (1–9)
- David Levine – producer (1–9)
- Jim Boyer – co-producer and mixing (1–9), engineer (1–8)
- Michele Slagter – associate producer (1–9)
- Kenny Loggins – co-producer (8)
- Marty Paich – co-producer (8)
- Bruce Springsteen – producer (10)
- Mike Appel – producer (10)
- Jimmy Iovine – producer, engineer, and mixing (10)
- Dan Cleary – executive producer
- Sherwin Bash – executive producer
- Scott Litt – engineer (9)
- Thom Panunzio – engineer and mixing (10)
- Ted Jensen – mastering
- Larry Franke – assistant engineer
- Scott Ettinger – assistant engineer
- Andy Hoffman – assistant engineer
- Lincoln Clapp – assistant engineer
- Jason Corsaro – assistant engineer
- Jim Cassell – assistant engineer
- Don Koldon – assistant engineer
- Tim Garrity – assistant engineer
- Robin Danar – assistant engineer
- Paula Scher – design
- Seymour Chwast – illustration

== Awards ==
Year	Award	Work	Category	Recipient	Result	Ref.
1981	Grammy Awards	In Harmony: A Sesame Street Record	Best Recording for Children	David Levine and Lucy Simon	Won	
1983	Grammy Awards	In Harmony 2	Best Recording for Children	David Levine and Lucy Simon	Won	
