= Winkin', Blinkin' and Nod: The Kapp Recordings =

2006 compilation album by the Simon Sisters

Compilation album by the Simon Sisters
- Released: 2006
- Recorded: 1964
- Genre: Folk
- Length: 1:06:18
- Label: Geffen, Hip-O-Select
- Producer: Charles Close, Jo Siopis

The Simon Sisters chronology
The Simon Sisters Sing the Lobster Quadrille and Other Songs for Children	Winkin', Blinkin' and Nod: The Kapp Recordings

Winkin', Blinkin' and Nod: The Kapp Recordings is a remastered compilation CD released by Geffen Records, and distributed on-line by Hip-O-Select, released in 2006.

It contains all 25 songs from the Simon Sisters' first two albums for Kapp Records: Meet the Simon Sisters (1964) and Cuddlebug (1966). A limited edition release, only 4,000 of these CDs were printed, and then it went out of print. A 12-page booklet was included, with extensive liner notes written by Carly Simon, along with several photographs of the duo.

Professional ratings
Review scores
Source	Rating
AllMusic	4/5 stars

== Track listing ==
All songs adapted and arranged by Carly and Lucy Simon; except where indicated.

No.	Title	Writer(s)	Length
1.	"So Glad I’m Here"	Bernard Krause, Clarence Cooper, Stuart Scharf	2:04
2.	"Breton Lullaby"	Traditional	2:22
3.	"Delia"	Traditional	2:26
4.	"Will You Go Laddie Go"	Traditional	1:33
5.	"Chicken Road"	Joe Greene	2:31
6.	"Once I Had A True Love"	Traditional	3:42
7.	"Wind Spiritual"	Billy Edd Wheeler	2:53
8.	"Winkin', Blinkin' and Nod"	Eugene Field, Lucy Simon	2:08
9.	"La Claire Fontaine"	Traditional	2:35
10.	"Rise Up"	Traditional	2:41
11.	"Lorca Lullaby"	Eric Regner, Lorca F. Garcia	2:52
12.	"Waley, Waley (The Water Is Wide)"	Traditional; adapted and arranged by Lucy Simon and Stuart Scharf	3:28
13.	"Sano Duso"	Traditional	2:21
14.	"Cuddlebug (The Happiness Blanket)"	Josef Berger, Alan Arkin	1:56
15.	"If You Come Down to the Water"	Carly Simon, Nick Delbanco	2:52
16.	"Dinks Blues"	Traditional; adapted and arranged by Lucy Simon and Stuart Scharf	3:46
17.	"Turn, Turn, Turn"	Ecclesiastes, Pete Seeger	2:24
18.	"Hold Back the Branches"	Carly Simon, Lope de Vega	2:43
19.	"Ecoute Dans La Vent (Blowin' in the Wind)"	Bob Dylan	2:31
20.	"Motherless Child"	Ronnie Gilbert, Frank Hamilton	1:51
21.	"No One to Talk My Troubles To"	Dick Weissman	2:44
22.	"My Fisherman, My Laddie Oh"	Earl Robinson, Waldo Salt	3:38
23.	"Feuilles Oh (Leaves)"	Lee Hays, Harold Bernz, Ruth Bernz	2:10
24.	"If I Had A Ribbon Bow"	Louis C. Singer, Hughie Prince	2:30
25.	"Pale Horse and Rider"	Carly Simon	2:24
Total length:			66:18

== Personnel ==
- Vocals: Lucy Simon, Carly Simon
- Compilation Produced by Mike Ragogna
- Executive Producer: Pat Lawrence
- Mastered by Erick Labson @ Universal Mastering Studios — North Hollywood, CA
- Editorial Assistance: Barry Korkin
- Tape Research: Randy Aronson
- Product Manager: Heather Whitten
- Art Director / Production Manager: Michele Horie
- Design: Greg Ross for Orabor
- Photo Coordinator: Ryan Null
- Photos: Peter Simon
