= Have You Seen Me Lately =

Studio album by Carly Simon
- Released: September 25, 1990
- Studios: Right Track Recording (New York City, New York)
- Genre: Rock
- Length: 50:26
- Label: Arista
- Producers: Frank Filipetti; Paul Samwell-Smith

Carly Simon chronology
My Romance (1990)	Have You Seen Me Lately (1990)	This Is My Life (Music from the Motion Picture) (1992)

Singles from Have You Seen Me Lately
- 1. "Better Not Tell Her" Released: 1990; 2. "Holding Me Tonight" Released: 1990

Have You Seen Me Lately is the 15th studio album by American singer-songwriter Carly Simon, released by Arista Records, on September 25, 1990.

The album spent 32 weeks on the US Billboard 200, peaking at No. 60. The first single, "Better Not Tell Her", was very successful on the Billboard Adult Contemporary chart, charting for 21 weeks, peaking at No. 4, and becoming Simon's biggest hit of the 1990s. The second single, "Holding Me Tonight", was also successful on this chart, peaking at No. 36 and charting for five weeks. The track "Fisherman's Song" features backing vocals by Judy Collins and Simon's sister, Lucy Simon. Simon released a children's book based on the song the following year.

The album's title track was written for the Mike Nichols film Postcards from the Edge (1990), but the entire title sequence – including the song – was deleted by producers, although a great deal of Simon's underscore compositions and thematic interludes remain in the film, eventually earning her a BAFTA nomination for Best Film Score in 1991.

== Promotion ==
Simon released music videos for the singles "Better Not Tell Her" and "Holding Me Tonight"; the former being shot on a beach on Martha's Vineyard in July 1990 - at the estate of Jackie Onassis. Simon also performed the latter on Late Night with David Letterman in 1990. Simon performed the tracks "Happy Birthday" and "Life Is Eternal" on a 1991 episode of The Phil Donahue Show.

== Reception ==
Professional ratings
Review scores
Source	Rating
AllMusic	3/5 stars
Entertainment Weekly	B

Stephen Holden, writing in The New York Times, called the album "superb" and the title track "the album's most stunning moment". Greg Sandow, writing for Entertainment Weekly, graded the album B, and stated "'Life Is Eternal' breathes an air of genuine uplift" and "'Better Not Tell Her' and the title track sound firm, tender, and genuine, with pointed melodies and an airy outdoor aura". In a retrospective review from AllMusic, William Ruhlmann rated the album three stars out of five: "Simon has always written songs for her age group; here, it's the fortysomethings of the 1990s. At the end, "We Just Got Here" provides the summer's-end metaphor for middle age." Ruhlmann also singled out the tracks "Better Not Tell Her" and "Fisherman's Song".

== Awards ==
Year	Award	Category	Work/Recipient	Result	Ref.
1991	Boston Music Awards	Outstanding Pop Album	Have You Seen Me Lately	Nominated	
1991	Boston Music Awards	Outstanding Female Vocalist	Carly Simon	Nominated	

== Track listing ==
Credits adapted from the album's liner notes.

No.	Title	Writer(s)	Length
1.	"Better Not Tell Her"	Carly Simon	5:21
2.	"Didn't I?"	Simon	2:51
3.	"Have You Seen Me Lately?"	Simon	4:16
4.	"Life Is Eternal"	Simon; Teese Gohl	5:25
5.	"Waiting at the Gate"	Simon; Jacob Brackman	6:17
6.	"Happy Birthday"	Simon	4:53
7.	"Holding Me Tonight"	Simon	4:17
8.	"It's Not Like Him"	Simon; Brackman	4:31
9.	"Don't Wrap It Up"	Simon	4:19
10.	"Fisherman's Song"	Simon	3:54
11.	"We Just Got Here"	Simon	4:22
Total length:			50:26

== Personnel ==
=== Musicians ===
- Carly Simon – lead vocals, keyboards, guitars
- Teese Gohl – keyboards, string arrangements and conductor
- Jimmy Ryan – acoustic guitar, acoustic bass (6)
- Jay Berliner – Spanish guitar solo (1)
- John McCurry – electric guitar (3, 7)
- Dirk Ziff – additional acoustic guitar (7)
- Will Lee – bass guitar (1–5, 7–10)
- Bruce Samuels – acoustic bass (11)
- Steve Gadd – drums
- Jimmy Bralower – drum programming
- Naná Vasconcelos – additional percussion (4, 6)
- Michael Brecker – EWI (3, 8)
- Marvin Stamm – trumpet (7)

Background vocalists

- Lani Groves – backing vocals
- Will Lee – backing vocals, other lead vocal (4)
- Jimmy Ryan – backing vocals
- Paul Samwell-Smith – backing vocals
- Lucy Simon – backing vocals, additional vocals (10)
- Julie Levine – additional backing vocals (4)
- Ben Taylor – additional backing vocals (4, 6)
- Sally Taylor – additional backing vocals (4, 6)
- Judy Collins – additional vocals (10)

=== Production ===
- Frank Filipetti – producer, recording, mixing
- Paul Samwell-Smith – producer
- John Herman – assistant engineer
- Ted Jensen – mastering at Sterling Sound (New York, NY)
- Carolyn Quan – design
- Bob Gothard – photography
- Kathy Schinhofen – hand lettering
- Champion Entertainment Organization, Inc. – management

== Charts ==
Chart (1990)	Peak position
US Billboard 200	60
Canada Top Albums/CDs (RPM)	64
Australian Albums (Kent Music Report)	160
US Cash Box Top 200 Albums	58
