= Meet the Simon Sisters =

Studio album by the Simon Sisters
- Released: 1964
- Recorded: 1963–1964
- Genre: Folk
- Label: Kapp

The Simon Sisters chronology
Meet the Simon Sisters (1964)	Cuddlebug (1964)

Professional ratings
Review scores
Source	Rating
AllMusic	3/5 stars

Meet the Simon Sisters is the debut studio album by the Simon Sisters, released by Kapp Records, in 1964.

Consisting of sisters Lucy Simon and Carly Simon, the duo had a minor hit with "Winkin’, Blinkin’ And Nod", a children's poem by Eugene Field that Lucy had put to music. The single reached No. 73 on the Billboard Hot 100. They quickly followed the album up with Cuddlebug, which was recorded during the same sessions as Meet the Simon Sisters.

== Releases ==
In 2006, Hip-O-Select re-released the album, along with Cuddlebug, as the single disc "Winkin', Blinkin' and Nod: The Kapp Recordings". Carly provided liner notes in the albums 12-page booklet. The album was available exclusively through Hip-O-Records.com and Amazon.com. Only 4,000 copies were printed, and it is now out of print.

== Track listing ==
Credits adapted from the album's liner notes. All songs are of traditional origin, except where noted.

Side one
No.	Title	Writer(s)	Length
1.	"So Glad I’m Here"	Bernard Krause, Clarence Cooper, Stuart Scharf	2:04
2.	"Breton Lullaby"		2:22
3.	"Delia"		2:26
4.	"Will You Go Laddie Go"		1:33
5.	"Chicken Road"	Joe Greene	2:31
6.	"Once I Had A True Love"		3:42
7.	"Wind Spiritual"	Billy Edd Wheeler	2:53

Side two
No.	Title	Writer(s)	Length
1.	"Winkin', Blinkin' and Nod"	Eugene Field, Lucy Simon	2:08
2.	"La Claire Fontaine"		2:35
3.	"Rise Up"		2:41
4.	"Lorca Lullaby"	Eric Regner, Lorca F. Garcia	2:52
5.	"Waley, Waley (The Water Is Wide)"		3:28
6.	"Sano Duso"		2:21
