= The Simon Sisters Sing the Lobster Quadrille and Other Songs for Children =

1969 studio album by The Simon Sisters

The Simon Sisters Sing The Lobster Quadrille and Other Songs for Children

Studio album by The Simon Sisters
- Released: 1969
- Recorded: 1969
- Genre: Children's Folk
- Label: Columbia
- Producer: Arthur Shimkin

The Simon Sisters chronology
Cuddlebug	The Simon Sisters Sing The Lobster Quadrille and Other Songs for Children	Winkin', Blinkin' and Nod: The Kapp Recordings

Re-release cover

Professional ratings
Review scores
Source	Rating
AllMusic	4/5 stars

The Simon Sisters Sing The Lobster Quadrille and Other Songs for Children is the third and final studio album by the Simon Sisters, released by Columbia Records, in 1969.

The album features musical settings of classic children's poetry.

== Releases ==
Lobster Quadrille was released as Columbia CC 24506 with a blue label, and it was their first release for Columbia Records. The album originally came packaged with a hardcover illustrated book containing all the poems. It was re-released without the book as Columbia CR 21525 with a red label.

The album was reissued in 1973 to capitalize on Carly Simon's success as a solo artist, under the title Lucy & Carly – The Simon Sisters Sing for Children as Columbia CR 21539. For this edition, additional instrumentation was added to the original album to give it a more pop-oriented sound. It also has a new cover featuring a photo of the sisters.

In 2008, Shout! Factory released the album on CD, under the title Carly & Lucy Simon Sing Songs for Children. Although the disc's packaging uses the illustration from the album's original cover, the CD contains the 1973 version of the album.

== Track listing ==
Credits adapted from the album's liner notes.

Side 1
No.	Title	Lyric source	Length
1.	"Wynken, Blynken and Nod"	Eugene Field	2:27
2.	"Calico Pie"	Edward Lear	3:00
3.	"The Lamplighter"	Robert Louis Stevenson	1:49
4.	"The Owl and the Pussycat"	Edward Lear	2:09
5.	"Sleep, Baby, Sleep"	Adapted from Mother Goose by Lucy Simon	2:53

Side 2
No.	Title	Lyric source	Length
6.	"The Lamb"	William Blake	2:14
7.	"The Lobster Quadrille"	Lewis Carroll	2:49
8.	"Who Has Seen the Wind"	Christina Rossetti	2:20
9.	"I Heard the Bells on Christmas Day"	Henry Wadsworth Longfellow	3:24
10.	"A Red, Red Rose"	Robert Burns	2:50
11.	"A Pavane for the Nursery"	William Jay Smith	2:33

== Personnel ==
- Vocals: Lucy Simon, Carly Simon
- Music composed by: Lucy Simon
- Arranged and conducted by: Sam Brown
- Original recording (1969) engineering: Fred Plaut, Roy Segal
- Additional recording and mixing (1973): Tim Geelan, Jim Timmens
- Produced for Columbia by: Arthur Shimkin
- Cover photograph (1973) by: Barry Brown
- Liner notes by: Mort Goode
