= Carly Simon =

American musician (born 1943)

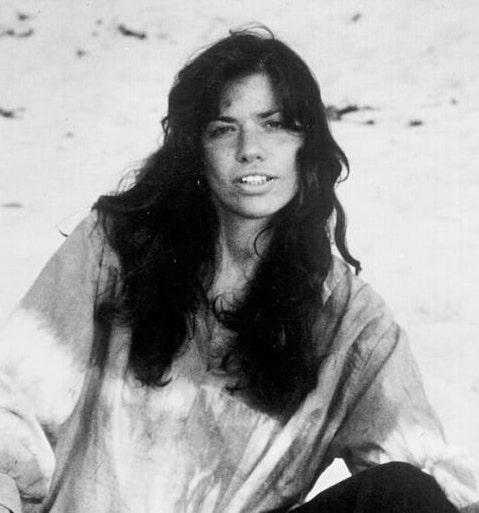
- Simon in 1972
- Born: Carly Elisabeth Simon; June 25, 1943 (age 83) (Note: Simon's year of birth has varied in different sources, given as any year from 1943 to 1946. Birth records give the year 1943, and most publications started listing June 25, 1943 as her date of birth in the 2020s after these records became widely accessible online.); New York City, U.S.
- Occupations: Singer; musician; songwriter; memoirist; author
- Years active: 1963–present
- Spouses: James Taylor (m. 1972; div. 1983) James Hart (m. 1987; div. 2007)
- Children: 2, including Sally Taylor
- Parents: Richard L. Simon (father); Andrea Heinemann Simon (mother)
- Relatives: Joanna Simon (sister) Lucy Simon (sister) George T. Simon (uncle)
- Musical career
- Genres: Soft rock; pop rock; folk
- Instruments: Vocals; guitar; piano
- Works: Carly Simon discography
- Labels: Elektra; Warner Bros.; Epic; Arista; Rhino; Columbia; Hear Music; Iris
- Formerly of: The Simon Sisters
- Website: carlysimon.com

Signature
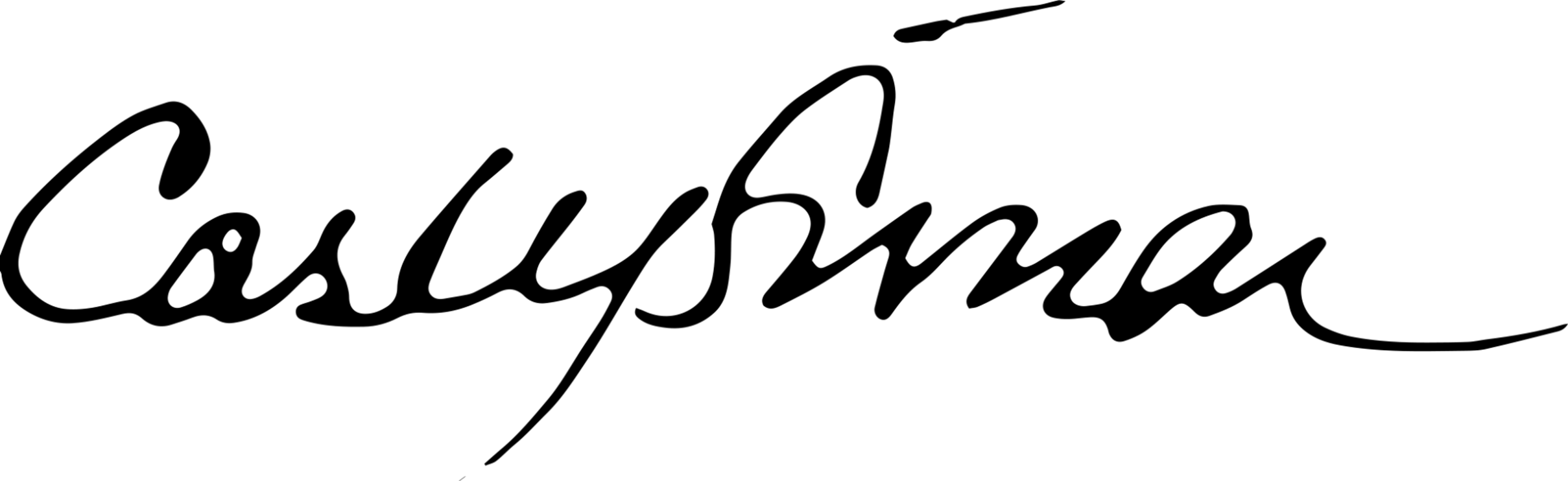

Carly Elisabeth Simon (born June 25, 1943) is an American musician, singer, songwriter, and author. She rose to fame in the 1970s with a string of hit records; her 13 top 40 U.S. hits include "That's the Way I've Always Heard It Should Be" (No. 10), "Anticipation" (No. 13), "The Right Thing to Do" (No. 17), "Haven't Got Time for the Pain" (No. 14), "You Belong to Me" (No. 6), "Coming Around Again" (No. 18), and her four Gold-certified singles "You're So Vain" (No. 1), "Mockingbird" (No. 5, a duet with James Taylor), "Nobody Does It Better" (No. 2) from the 1977 James Bond film The Spy Who Loved Me, and "Jesse" (No. 11). She has authored two memoirs and five children's books.

In 1963, Simon began performing with her sister Lucy Simon in the Simon Sisters. Their debut album, Meet the Simon Sisters, featured the song "Winkin', Blinkin' and Nod", based on the poem by Eugene Field and put to music by Lucy. The song became a minor hit and reached No. 73 on the Billboard Hot 100. The duo would release two more albums: Cuddlebug (1966) and The Simon Sisters Sing for Children (1969). After Lucy left the group, Carly found great success as a solo artist with her 1971 self-titled debut album, which won her the Grammy Award for Best New Artist and spawned her first top 10 single "That's the Way I've Always Heard It Should Be", which earned her a Grammy Award nomination for Best Female Pop Vocal Performance. Simon's second album, Anticipation, followed later that year and became an even greater success; it spawned the successful singles "Anticipation" and "Legend in Your Own Time", earned her another Grammy nomination, and became her first album to be certified Gold by the RIAA.

Simon achieved international fame with her third album, No Secrets (1972), which sat at No. 1 on the Billboard 200 for five weeks and was certified Platinum. The album spawned the worldwide hit "You're So Vain", which sat at No. 1 on the Billboard Hot 100 for three weeks, and earned Simon three Grammy nominations, including Record of the Year and Song of the Year. The second single "The Right Thing to Do", as well as its B-side "We Have No Secrets", were also successful. Her fourth album, Hotcakes (1974), soon followed and became an instant success; it reached No. 3 on the Billboard 200, went Gold within two weeks of release, and spawned the hit singles "Mockingbird" and "Haven't Got Time for the Pain". In 1975, Simon's fifth album, Playing Possum, and the compilation, The Best of Carly Simon, both appeared; the former hit the top 10 on the Billboard 200 chart and spawned the hit single "Attitude Dancing" (No. 21), and the latter eventually went 3× Platinum, becoming Simon's best-selling release.

In 1977, Simon recorded "Nobody Does It Better" as the theme song to the Bond film The Spy Who Loved Me, and it became a worldwide hit. The song garnered her another Grammy nomination, and was the No. 1 Adult Contemporary hit of 1977. Retrospectively, it has been ranked one of the greatest Bond themes. Simon began recording more songs for films in the 1980s, including "Coming Around Again" for the film Heartburn (1986). The song became a major Adult Contemporary hit, and the Coming Around Again album appeared the following year, to further critical and commercial success. The album earned Simon two Grammy nominations, went Platinum, and spawned three more top 10 Adult Contemporary hit singles: "Give Me All Night", "The Stuff That Dreams Are Made Of", and "All I Want Is You". With her 1988 hit "Let the River Run", from the film Working Girl, Simon became the first artist to win a Grammy Award, an Academy Award, and a Golden Globe Award for a song composed and written, as well as performed, entirely by a single artist.

One of the most popular of the confessional singer/songwriters who emerged in the early 1970s, Simon has 24 Billboard Hot 100-charting singles and 28 Billboard Adult Contemporary charting singles. Among her various accolades, she has won two Grammy Awards (from 14 nominations), and was inducted into the Grammy Hall of Fame for "You're So Vain" in 2004. AllMusic called her "one of the quintessential singer-songwriters of the '70s". She has a contralto vocal range, and cited Odetta as a significant influence. Simon was inducted into the Songwriters Hall of Fame in 1994. She was honored with the Boston Music Awards Lifetime Achievement in 1995, and received a Berklee College of Music Honorary Doctor of Music Degree in 1998. In 2005, Simon was nominated for a star on the Hollywood Walk of Fame, but she has yet to claim her star. In 2012, she was honored with the Founders Award from the American Society of Composers, Authors and Publishers. In 2022, Simon was inducted into the Rock and Roll Hall of Fame.

== Early life ==
Simon was born on June 25, 1943, in New York City. Her father, Richard L. Simon, was the co-founder of Simon & Schuster and a classical pianist who often played Chopin and Beethoven at home. Her mother, Andrea (née Heinemann), was a civil rights activist and singer. Her father was from a German-Jewish family, while her mother was Catholic. Her maternal grandfather, Friedrich Heinemann, was of German descent; her maternal grandmother, Ofelia Oliete, known as "Chibie", was a Catholic originally from Cuba, and was of Pardo heritage, a freed-slave descendant. Ofelia was raised primarily in England by nuns until the age of 16. A 2017 episode of PBS show Finding Your Roots tested Simon's DNA, which included 10% African and 2% Native American, likely via her maternal grandmother.

Simon was raised in the Riverdale neighborhood of the Bronx, and had two elder sisters, Joanna and Lucy, and a younger brother, Peter, all of whom died of cancer, predeceasing her (in 2018–2022). They were raised as Catholics, according to a book of photography Peter published in the late 1990s. Simon has stated that when she was seven years old, a family friend in his teens sexually assaulted her. She stated, "It was heinous", adding, "It changed my view about sex for a long time."

Simon began stuttering severely when she was eight years old. A psychiatrist tried unsuccessfully to cure her stuttering. Instead, Simon turned to singing and songwriting. "I felt so strangulated talking that I did the natural thing, which is to write songs, because I could sing without stammering, as all stammerers can." She has also spoken about growing up with dyslexia as well as her belief that the condition has positively influenced her songwriting, saying that her hit song "Anticipation" "came down from the universe into my head and then out my mouth, so it bypassed the mind."

Simon attended Riverdale Country School and spent at least four semesters at Sarah Lawrence College. She also attended Juilliard School of Music.

== Career ==
=== 1963–1969: The Simon Sisters and Elephant's Memory ===
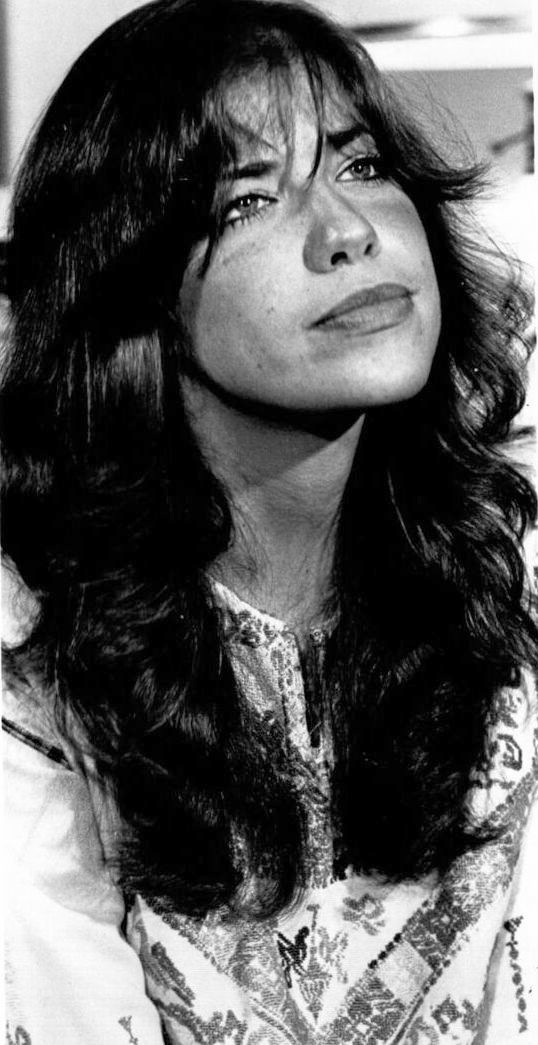
Simon in a 1971 photo promoting an appearance on PBS's Great American Dream Machine

Simon's career began with a music group with her sister Lucy Simon as the Simon Sisters, with Lucy singing soprano and Carly contralto. Signed to Kapp Records, they made their television debut performing on Hootenanny on April 27, 1963. They released two albums for the label, the first being Meet the Simon Sisters (1964). The album produced a minor hit for the duo with the single "Winkin', Blinkin' and Nod", a children's poem by Eugene Field that Lucy had put to music. Their second album, Cuddlebug (1966), soon followed. These albums were made available on CD in 2006 as Winkin', Blinkin' and Nod: The Kapp Recordings, a remastered limited edition single-disc compilation. The duo made one more album together, 1969's The Simon Sisters Sing the Lobster Quadrille and Other Songs for Children (which was released on CD in 2008 under the title Carly & Lucy Simon Sing Songs for Children).

In the Peter Coan biography "Taxi: The Harry Chapin Story", it had been suggested that Chapin, performing with his brothers, had briefly considered an idea of merging their act with the Simon Sisters, and performing under the new moniker "The Brothers and Sisters". This idea was scrapped once Chapin and Simon's careers as solo artists began to gain traction.

Simon collaborated with eclectic New York rockers Elephant's Memory for about six months in the late '60s. Simon later said of her time with the band: "I hated the gigs. We played clubs where everyone smoked dope and cigarettes at the same time. The sound systems were so dreadful I lost my voice easily and regularly, and after a summer I quit." In 1968, Simon met and befriended Jacob Brackman. Brackman would later become a frequent songwriting collaborator, with Simon describing him as her best friend: "When I moved to my apartment on 35th St. (Murray Hill), Jake lived around the corner and we were inseparable, sharing our social lives. He introduced me to so many of the friends I still have."

=== 1970–1971: Going solo and mainstream success ===
Simon was signed by Jac Holzman to Elektra Records in 1970. She released her self-titled debut album on February 9, 1971, and it peaked at No. 30 on the Billboard 200. The album contained her breakthrough hit "That's the Way I've Always Heard It Should Be", which peaked at No. 10 on the Billboard Pop singles (Hot 100) chart, and earned Simon a nomination for Best Female Pop Vocal Performance at the 14th Annual Grammy Awards, where she also won Best New Artist. In his review of the album for Rolling Stone, Timothy Crouse stated "Carly's voice perfectly matches her material" and her "...superbly controlled voice is complemented by deft arrangements."

Her second album, Anticipation, followed November 1971. Like its predecessor, the album peaked at No. 30 on the Billboard 200, and earned Simon a nomination for Best Female Pop Vocal Performance at the 15th Annual Grammy Awards. Writing for Rolling Stone, Stephen Davis gave a glowing review of the album, calling the title track "a spirited examination of the tensions involved in a burgeoning romantic situation in which nobody has any idea of what's going on or what's going to happen." He also singled out "Our First Day Together" as "a quiet song, lovely and quite enigmatic, with a trace of the minor chord influence of Joni Mitchell," as well as "I've Got To Have You", which he described as "an absolute clincher." On her experience of recording the album, Simon later said: "It was one of the best memories I shall ever have of recording. I had a band. The entire album was just that band (Andy Newmark, Jimmy Ryan, Paul Glanz) and myself. Cat Stevens did some vocals and there were strings on a few songs, but on the whole, it was sparse, and I loved it."

The album's lead single, also titled "Anticipation", became a significant hit, reaching No. 3 at Easy Listening radio and No. 13 on Billboard's Pop singles chart. It subsequently became notable in popular culture for its use in a variety of commercials to market the ketchup of the H. J. Heinz Company. The single was written in 15 minutes while Simon waited for Cat Stevens to pick her up for a date. The pair had become romantically involved shortly after Simon had opened for Stevens at L.A.'s Troubadour around the time her debut album was released. The next single release, "Legend in Your Own Time", made a more modest impact on the Pop singles chart, peaking at No. 50. It was very successful on the Easy Listening chart, nearly cracking the top 10 at No. 11. The closing song, "I've Got to Have You" (written by Kris Kristofferson), was released as a single in Australia and reached the Top 10 on the Kent Music Report in 1972.

Also in 1971, Simon appeared as an auditioning singer in Miloš Forman film Taking Off, performing "Long Term Physical Effects", which was also included on the soundtrack album for the film.

=== 1972–1974: No Secrets, "You're So Vain", and Hotcakes ===
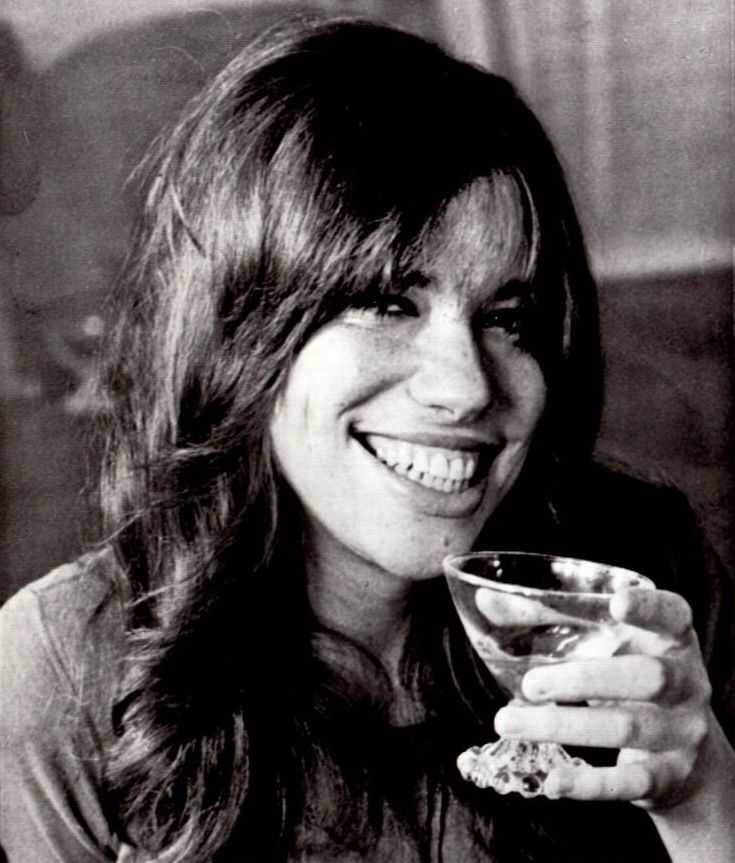
1972 press photo

Simon scored the biggest success of her career in 1972–73 with "You're So Vain". The single hit No. 1 on the U.S. Pop and Adult Contemporary charts, sold over a million copies in the United States alone, and became one of the decade's biggest hits. The song's success propelled Simon's breakthrough album, No Secrets, to No. 1 on the Billboard 200 chart for five consecutive weeks. The album achieved Gold status that year, and by its 25th anniversary in 1997, it had been certified Platinum. "You're So Vain" received nominations for Record of the Year, Song of the Year and Best Pop Vocal Performance, Female at the 16th Annual Grammy Awards, where No Secrets also earned a nomination for Best Engineered Recording. Additionally, it was inducted into the Grammy Hall of Fame in 2004 and was listed at No. 72 in 2008 on the Billboard Hot 100's list of the top 100 songs from the chart's first 50 years, August 1958 through July 2008. On August 23, 2014, the UK Official Charts Company gave it the accolade of 'ultimate song of the 1970s'. In 2021, Rolling Stone ranked it No. 495 on their list of the 500 Greatest Songs of All Time.

The subject of "You're So Vain" became one of the biggest mysteries in popular music, with the famous lyric "You're so vain/I bet you think this song is about you". For more than 40 years, Simon never publicly revealed the name of the subject. She hinted that it could be a composite of several people, with press speculation considering it could be Warren Beatty or Mick Jagger, who sings backup vocals on the recording (but Jagger himself, in 2026 refuted the suggestion that he was ever the subject). Simon hinted the identity to a variety of talk shows and publications over the years, and, on August 5, 2003, auctioned off the information to the winner of a charity function for US$50,000, with the condition that the winner, television executive Dick Ebersol, did not reveal it. Finally, in November 2015, Simon, promoting her about-to-be-published memoir, said, "I have confirmed that the second verse is Warren" and added that while "Warren thinks the whole thing is about him", he is the subject only of that verse, with the remainder of the song referring to two other, still unnamed men.

The follow-up single, "The Right Thing to Do" (a love song directed to Simon's then husband James Taylor), was another sizable hit later in 1973, reaching No. 4 on the Adult Contemporary chart and No. 17 on the Pop chart. The single's B-side, "We Have No Secrets", also became noteworthy; Rolling Stone critic Stephen Holden regarded the track as exemplifying the theme of No Secrets, which he saw as the "difficulty of being happy," by "painfully" expressing "the realization that emotion and rationalization are often irreconcilable." That same year, Simon performed on Lee Clayton's self-titled album and co-sang on the song "New York Suite 409". She also performed on brother-in-law Livingston Taylor's album Over the Rainbow, and sang with both Livingston and his famous brother James on the songs "Loving Be My New Horizon" and "Pretty Woman".

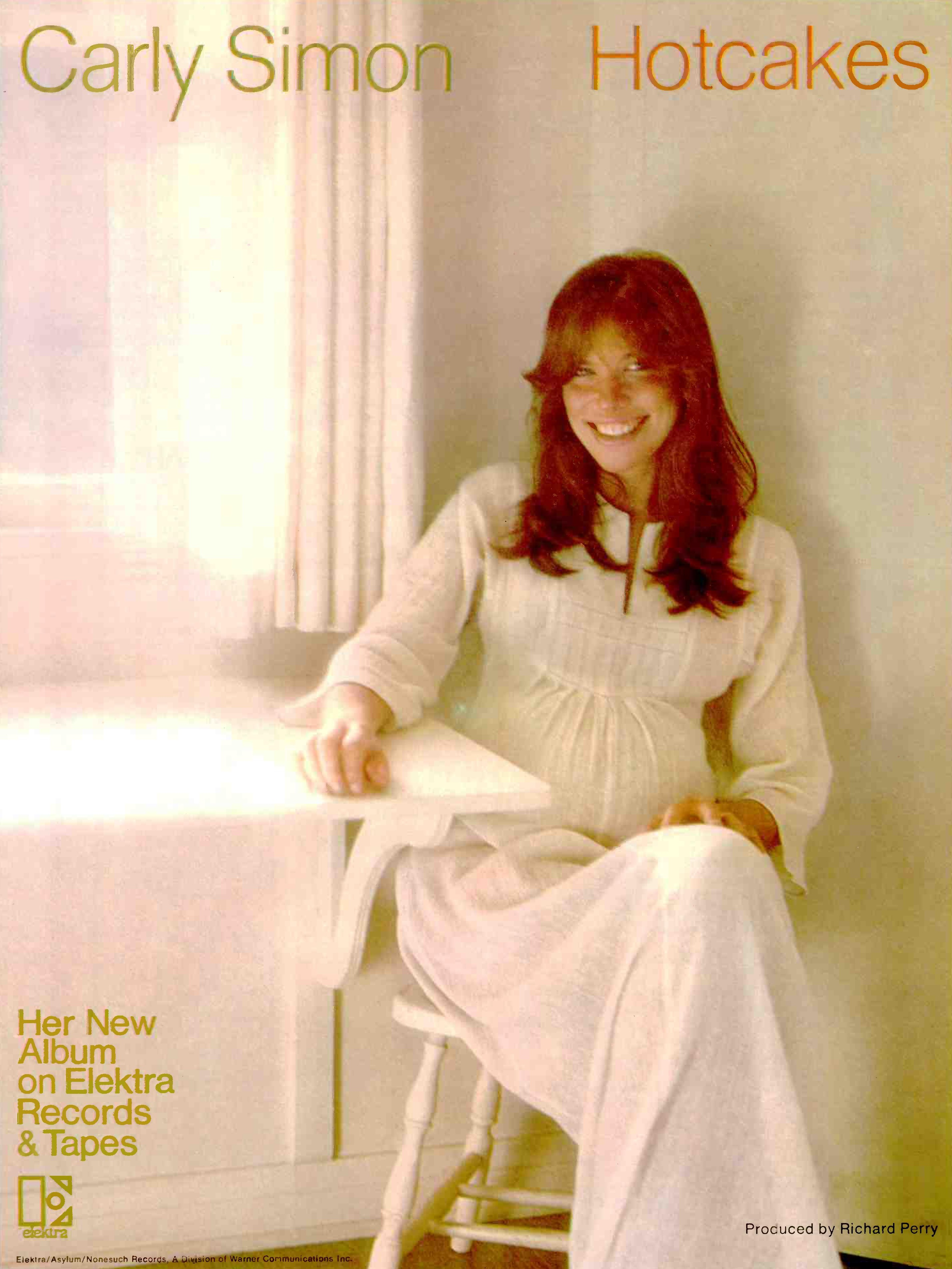
Trade ad for Hotcakes

In 1974, Simon followed the hugely successful No Secrets album with Hotcakes, which became an instant hit. It reached No. 3 on the Billboard 200, remained on the chart for nearly eight months, and went Gold. Hotcakes included two top ten singles: "Mockingbird", a duet with James Taylor that peaked at No. 5 on Billboard's Pop Singles chart, and "Haven't Got Time for the Pain", which hit No. 2 on Billboard's Adult Contemporary chart. The album was also well received critically; Jon Landau, writing in Rolling Stone, stated "Hotcakes is playful-sounding with some serious overtones — a balance that best suits [Simon] for the time being." He also singled out the tracks "Think I'm Gonna Have a Baby", "Forever My Love", and "Haven't Got Time for the Pain" as "substantial songs and performances, superior to almost everything else she has so far recorded." The same year, Simon provided vocals on Tom Rush's album Ladies Love Outlaws and co-sang with Rush on "No Regrets" and as backup on "Claim on Me".

=== 1975–1977: Playing Possum, "Nobody Does it Better", and continued success ===
Simon's Playing Possum (1975) and Another Passenger (1976) continued her run of high-profile and generally well-received album releases. Playing Possum hit the Top 10 on the Billboard 200, and garnered a successful Top 40 single with "Attitude Dancing", as well as two other charting singles, but its racy album cover, which depicts Simon wearing only a black negligee and knee-high black boots, generated controversy. It was nominated for Best Album Package at the 18th Annual Grammy Awards. Shortly after the release of Playing Possum, Elektra released her first greatest hits album, The Best of Carly Simon. A major success, it went Gold within three weeks of release, and eventually became Simon's all-time best-selling disc, reaching Triple-Platinum status in the United States by the mid-1990s. The album also went Gold in Canada and Quintuple-Platinum in Australia.

Another Passenger reached No. 29 on Billboard 200 and produced only one charting single on the Pop singles chart, "It Keeps You Runnin'" (written by Michael McDonald of the Doobie Brothers), which peaked just outside the Top 40 at No. 46. The second single, "Half a Chance", only charted on the Adult Contemporary chart, peaking at No. 39. Despite the lukewarm commercial reception, the album was, and remains one of Simon's best reviewed works; Rolling Stone called it "Carly Simon's best record", and it became a favorite among many of Simon's fans. To promote the album, Simon made her only appearance on Saturday Night Live, on May 8, 1976. It was a pre-taped performance—a rare occurrence on that show—because she suffered terrible bouts of stage fright. In the appearance, she sang two songs: "Half a Chance" and her signature song, "You're So Vain". That same year saw Simon contributing backup vocals on the song "Peter" on Peter Ivers's self-titled album.

In 1977, Simon had an international hit with the million-selling Gold single "Nobody Does It Better", the theme to the James Bond film The Spy Who Loved Me. The song, her second-biggest U.S. hit after "You're So Vain", was 1977's biggest Adult Contemporary hit, where it held No. 1 for seven consecutive weeks. The single peaked one step behind Debby Boone's hugely successful hit "You Light Up My Life" on Billboard's Pop Singles chart from October 22 to November 5, 1977, and received nominations for Song of the Year and Best Pop Vocal Performance, Female at the 20th Annual Grammy Awards. In 2012, Rolling Stone ranked it the third-greatest James Bond theme song, while Billboard ranked it the second-greatest. In 2021, USA Today crowned it the greatest James Bond Theme Song. Also in 1977, Simon co-produced Libby Titus's album Libby Titus, and sang backup on two songs: "Can This Be Our Love Affair?" and "Darkness 'Til Dawn", the later which comes from Simon's album Another Passenger.

=== 1978–1979: Boys in the Trees, MUSE concerts, and departure from Elektra ===
Simon's career took another upward swing in 1978 with the Top 10 album Boys in the Trees. The album produced two Top 40 singles: the jazzy and sensual "You Belong to Me" (written with Michael McDonald, originally a Doobie Brothers deep cut from the year prior), which hit the Top 10 on both the Pop and Adult Contemporary charts, and "Devoted to You", a duet with James Taylor which hit No. 2 on Billboard's Adult Contemporary chart. Boys in the Trees was a major success, and returned Simon to Platinum album status in the U.S. "You Belong to Me" later earned Simon yet another nomination for Best Pop Vocal Performance, Female at the 21st Annual Grammy Awards, where the album also won Best Album Package. She was featured on the front covers of People and Rolling Stone magazines that year. Also in 1978, Simon and Taylor sang backing vocals on two songs for Taylor's sister Kate's album Kate Taylor: "Happy Birthday Sweet Darling" and "Jason & Ida". They sang backup on three songs on John Hall's debut solo album John Hall: "The Fault", "Good Enough", and "Voyagers". They also sing backup on one song, "Power", from Hall's next album, also titled Power (1979).

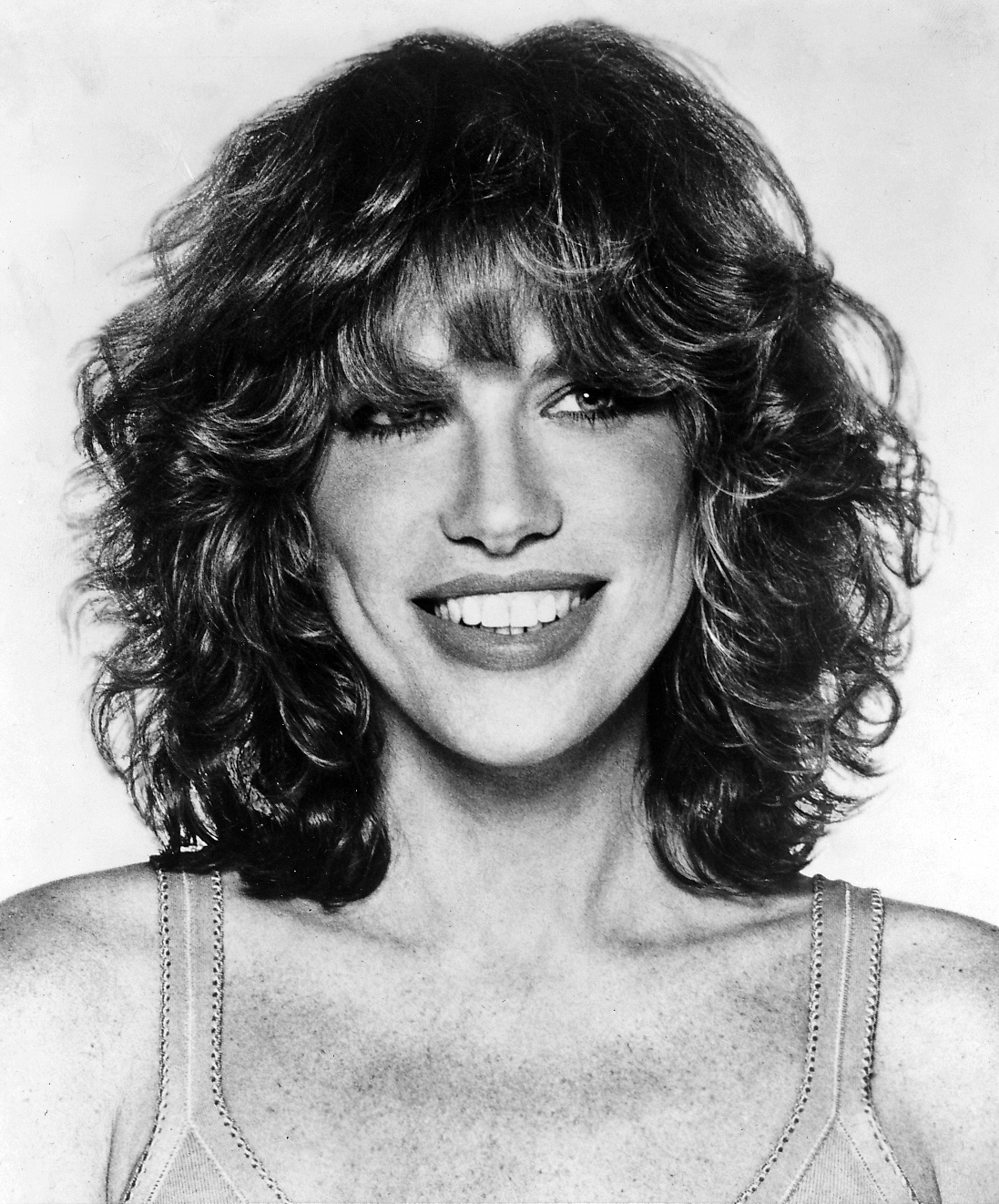
1978 publicity photo

On November 2, 1978, Simon guested on the song "I Live in the Woods" at a live, four-hour concert by Burt Bacharach and the Houston Symphony Orchestra at Jones Hall in Houston, Texas. All the songs at that concert became Bacharach's album Woman, which was released in 1979. That year, shortly after the Three Mile Island nuclear accident, from September 19 to 22, a series of concerts were held at New York City's Madison Square Garden and sponsored by Musicians United for Safe Energy (MUSE), a group of musicians against nuclear power, co-founded by John Hall. Always politically active, Simon and James Taylor were part of the concerts which later became a documentary and concert film: No Nukes (1980), as well as a live album of the same name (1979).

In 1979, Simon released her eighth studio album: Spy. The album's sales were a disappointment, peaking at only No. 45 on the Billboard 200, and it was her last album for Elektra. A hard-edged single from the album, "Vengeance", became a modest hit and received airplay on U.S. album rock stations, and peaked at No. 48 on the Billboard Pop singles chart. Cash Box said that it has "an urban rock feeling, with ominous guitar chording and touches of syndrums," saying that "Simon's vocals are...sharp and bold" but "less restrained than usual." "Vengeance" earned Simon a nomination for Best Rock Vocal Performance, Female at the 21st Annual Grammy Awards—the first ceremony to feature the new category. Simon made a music video for the track, and she would later become the second female solo artist to be featured on MTV's first day on the air in 1981 (Pat Benatar was the first female solo artist to appear on MTV, with "You Better Run", and Juice Newton was the third, with "Angel of the Morning").

Spy also features the songs "Never Been Gone" and "We're So Close", which have become fan favorites and stand among Simon's personal favorites of her own songs. Simon later called "We're So Close" "the saddest song I've ever written. It was about how close you can pretend to be when you know it's all coming undone. How you can use excuses to make it all look okay." In their review of the album, Rolling Stone also singled out "We're So Close", calling the track "the record's gem." In 2009, Simon released Never Been Gone, an album which includes a newly recorded version of "Never Been Gone", along with some of her other greatest hits.

=== 1980–1981: Move to Warner Bros, Come Upstairs, "Jesse", and Torch ===
In 1980, Simon signed with Elektra's sibling label Warner Bros. Records and released her ninth studio album: Come Upstairs. In Pittsburgh, Pennsylvania, during a show to promote the album, Simon fainted and collapsed onstage from exhaustion due to stage fright; "Fourteen shows were booked. I made it through eight and collapsed on stage. I had gotten very thin - only 114lbs. I canceled the rest of the shows," Simon later stated. She subsequently performed considerably less throughout the 1980s. From that album, Simon scored another million-selling U.S. Gold single with the hit "Jesse", which peaked at No. 11 on Billboard Pop singles chart and remained on the chart for six months. According to Billboard, "the melody is simple yet powerful, the words are complex and Simon's voice has never been better." Simon later said of the track: "'Jesse' was a song laying plain the fact that good intentions go to hell when you are crazy for someone." AllMusic reviewer William Ruhlmann retrospectively called the track "the album's highlight" and declared it "Simon's best-written pop/rock song since 'You're So Vain' and a Top Ten hit to boot." Ruhlmann additionally singled out the title track as "frisky and seductive" and referred to the album's second single, "Take Me as I Am", as "an upbeat raver."

Following the major commercial and critical success of "Jesse", Simon's singles became generally less successful in the mid-1980s, although most of them did well on Adult Contemporary radio formats. Simon also contributed the song "Be With Me" to the 1980 album In Harmony: A Sesame Street Record, which was produced by her sister Lucy and Lucy's husband, David Levine. Simon can also be heard on the song "In Harmony", along with other members of the Simon/Taylor families. Carly and Lucy contributed a Simon Sisters song—"Maryanne"—to the 1982 follow-up album In Harmony 2, which was also produced by Lucy and her husband. Both albums won the Grammy Award for Best Album for Children, in 1981 and 1983, respectively.

Simon's 10th release, Torch (1981), was an album of melancholy jazz standards, recorded long before it became fashionable for rock artists to delve into the "great American songbook". It peaked outside the Top 40 on Billboard 200 (at No. 50), but remained on the charts for nearly six months and subsequently became one of her best-selling catalogue albums. The album was well-received critically; Stephen Holden, writing in Rolling Stone, called the album "a gorgeous throwback", stating Simon's "magnificent alto, with its rough-and-tumble lows and wistful highs, has never sounded better." Torch also features one original song by Simon, "From the Heart", as well as Stephen Sondheim's "Not a Day Goes By", from his then-new musical Merrily We Roll Along.

=== 1982–1985: "Why", Hello Big Man, move to Epic, and commercial decline ===
In 1982, Simon sang the Nile Rodgers & Bernard Edwards-produced single "Why", from the soundtrack album to the film Soup for One. It was a Top 10 hit in the U.K., and successful throughout Europe. Although "Why" stalled at No. 74 in the U.S., the song became a mellow classic in the aftermath of its being picked up to be covered and sampled by different artists from around 1989 onward. In 2015, Pitchfork ranked it No. 188 on their list of the 200 Best Songs of the 1980s. She had another UK success (No. 17) with the single "Kissing with Confidence", a song from the 1983 album Dancing for Mental Health by Will Powers (a pseudonym for photographer Lynn Goldsmith). Simon was the uncredited singer of the song co-written and mixed by Todd Rundgren.

In 1983, Simon released her 11th album, Hello Big Man. Although it suffered from disappointing sales, the album received critical acclaim. Rolling Stone stated "Simon has returned to the sort of beautiful, folk-based singing and songwriting that originally made the world fall in love with her." Additionally, they singled out the title track and "It Happens Everyday" as "two of the album's best songs." The video for "It Happens Everyday" was produced by Music Motions for exclusive distribution to movie theaters. The lead single, "You Know What to Do", peaked at No. 83 on the Billboard Hot 100 chart, and No. 36 on the Adult Contemporary chart. Simon filmed a music video for the song at her home on Martha's Vineyard, which received moderate airplay on MTV in the autumn of 1983. That same year, Simon performed on two albums: The Perfect Stranger by Jesse Colin Young (singing on the track "Fight For It" with Young) and Wonderland by Nils Lofgren (singing on the track "Lonesome Ranger" with Lofgren). In 1984, Simon made an uncredited cameo appearance in Ray Parker Jr.'s music video for "Ghostbusters", the theme song from the film of the same name. By this time, her contract with Warner Bros. had ended.

In 1985, she signed with Epic Records and released her 12th album, Spoiled Girl. The album yielded two singles: "Tired of Being Blonde" and "My New Boyfriend", with only the former charting on the Billboard Hot 100 (No. 71) and Adult Contemporary chart (No. 34). The album was met with mixed reviews and was a commercial disappointment, peaking only at No. 88 on the Billboard 200, and her contract with Epic was cancelled. The album became a cult favorite within Simon's back catalogue. In July 2012, Hot Shot Records re-released the album as a deluxe edition with four bonus tracks. One of the album's tracks, "The Wives Are in Connecticut", caught the attention of Nora Ephron and Mike Nichols, who asked Simon to score their upcoming film Heartburn.

=== 1986–1989: Move to Arista, Coming Around Again, and career resurgence ===
In 1986, Simon signed with Arista Records and soon rebounded from her career slump. Her first album for Arista, Coming Around Again (1987), gave Simon another international hit with the title track (which was written for and featured in the 1986 Mike Nichols film Heartburn), returning her to the top 20 on the Billboard Hot 100 singles chart and the UK top 10. The album also featured the top 10 Adult Contemporary hits "Give Me All Night", "The Stuff That Dreams Are Made Of", "All I Want Is You" (which featured Roberta Flack on backing vocals), and the standard "As Time Goes By" (featuring Stevie Wonder on harmonica). Critical reception was also largely positive; People wrote "Simon remains perhaps the most interesting of women pop singers. This album proves she is still captivating." Similarly, The New York Times called it "the latest and one of the strongest chapters in a growing catalogue," it "embodies everything that the 41-year-old singer-songwriter does best."

The album remained on the Billboard 200 for over a year, became Simon's first Gold release in nine years, and went Platinum in 1988. It garnered her a Grammy Award nomination for Best Female Pop Vocal Performance that same year. In October 2017, Hot Shot Records released a two-disc 30th Anniversary deluxe edition of the album. These and older songs were featured in a picturesque HBO concert special titled Live from Martha's Vineyard, where Simon and her band performed live on a specially built stage in the town of Gay Head in early June 1987. Most of these songs were compiled for her 1988 album, Greatest Hits Live. Simon's first live album; Greatest Hits Live continued her mounting comeback, quickly going Gold, before later certified Platinum by the RIAA in 1996. From the album, a recording of Simon's evergreen "You're So Vain" was released as a single in the UK.

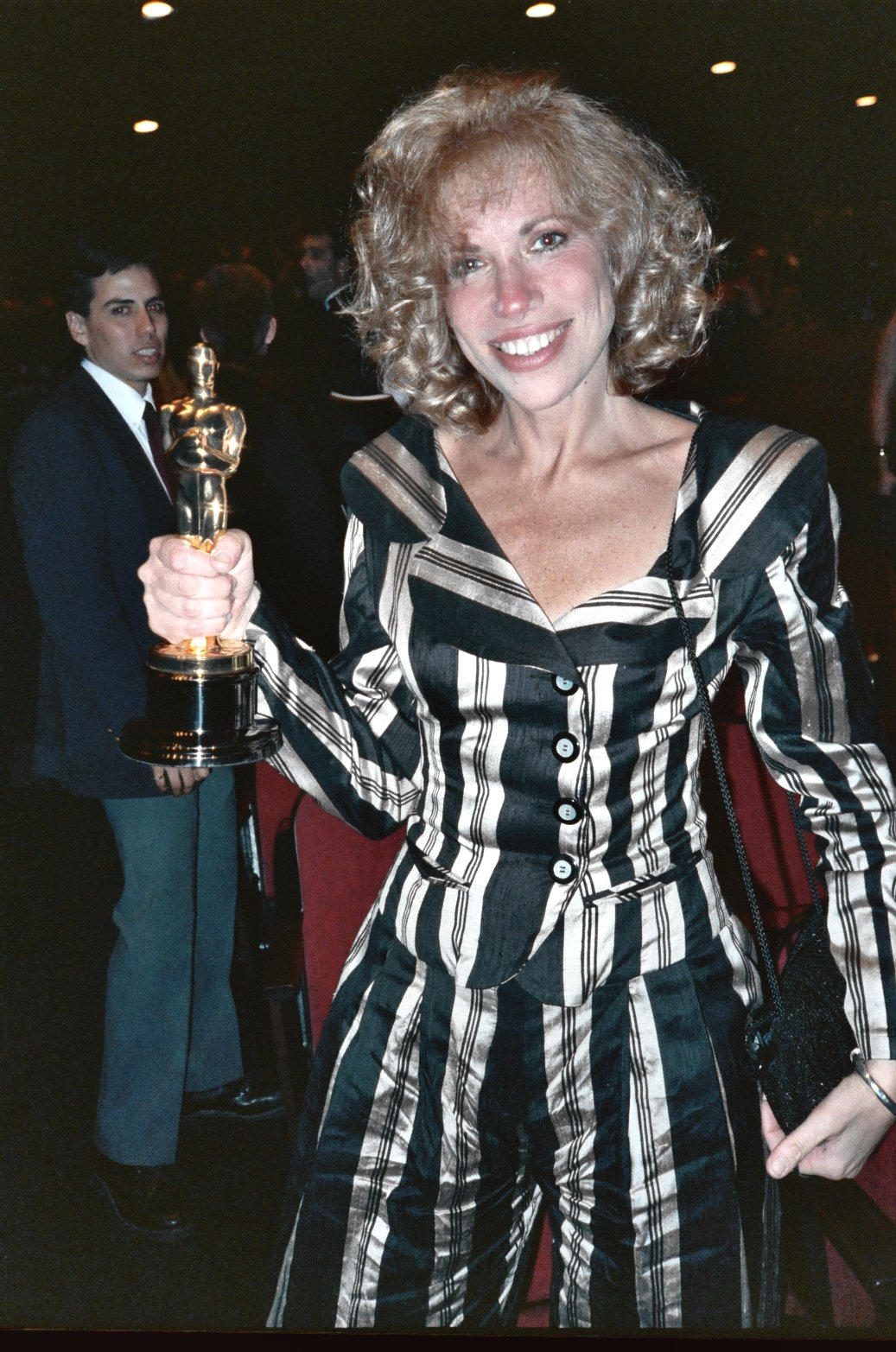
Simon, with her Oscar in hand, at the 61st Academy Awards (March 1989)

Throughout the 1980s, Simon successfully contributed to several film and television scores, including the songs:

- "Why" for the film Soup For One (1982).
- "Something More" for the film Love Child (1982).
- "Someone Waits for You" for the film Swing Shift (1984).
- "All the Love in the World" for the film Torchlight (1985).
- "It's Hard To Be Tender" for the television miniseries Sins (1986).
- "If It Wasn't Love" for the film Nothing in Common (1986).
- "Two Looking at One" for the film The Karate Kid Part II (1986).
- "Coming Around Again"/"Itsy Bitsy Spider" for the film Heartburn (1986).
- "Let the River Run" for the film Working Girl (1988), for which she won the Academy Award for Best Original Song (1988), the Golden Globe Award for Best Original Song (1988), and the Grammy Award for Best Song Written for a Motion Picture, Television or Other Visual Media (1990).

After the success of "Coming Around Again", Nichols asked Simon to score his next film, Working Girl. She spent the better part of 1988 scoring the film, and according to Simon, the studio threatened to replace "Let the River Run" with "Witchy Woman" by the Eagles. Nichols's decision prevailed, and Simon became the first artist to win all three major awards (Oscar, Golden Globe and Grammy) for a song composed and written, as well as performed, entirely by a single artist (the only other such artist being Bruce Springsteen for "Streets of Philadelphia", from the 1993 film Philadelphia). Her musical work on the film also earned Simon her first BAFTA Award nomination for Best Original Film Score in 1990. "Let the River Run" became a major hit, peaking at No. 49 on the Billboard Hot 100 and No. 11 on the Adult Contemporary chart. In 2004, AFI ranked the song at No. 91 on their list of the 100 greatest songs in American cinema. The Working Girl soundtrack album was released in August 1989, and featured more music from Simon. That same year, she released her first children's book, Amy the Dancing Bear.

As a tribute to Christa McAuliffe, who was slated to be the first teacher in space and who died in the 1986 Space Shuttle Challenger disaster, Simon wrote and recorded a song titled "You're Where I Go". McAuliffe was a Simon fan and had taken a cassette of her music on board the shuttle. In 1987, Simon co-wrote and recorded the title song to the Broadway play Sleight of Hand. The song was later released as the B-side to the single "Give Me All Night", from the Coming Around Again album. That same year, Simon also sang the theme for the 1988 Democratic National Convention, "The Turn of the Tide", for a Marlo Thomas television special Free to Be... a Family. The song was later included on the 1988 soundtrack album on A&M Records.

=== 1990–1994: My Romance, Have You Seen Me Lately, and continued success ===
In 1990, Simon released her second standards album, My Romance, and an album of original material, Have You Seen Me Lately. My Romance was quickly followed by another concert special for HBO, titled Carly in Concert: My Romance and featuring Harry Connick, Jr. Have You Seen Me Lately features a title track that was supposed to have been the main theme for the Mike Nichols film Postcards from the Edge; the entire title sequence – including the song – was deleted by producers, although a great deal of Simon's underscore compositions and thematic interludes remain in the film, eventually earning Simon her second BAFTA Award nomination for Best Original Film Score in 1991. The album was a critical and commercial success, spending eight months on the Billboard 200, while Stephen Holden, writing in The New York Times, called the album "superb" and the title track "the album's most stunning moment." The album also features the major (No. 4) Adult Contemporary chart hit "Better Not Tell Her", which remained on the chart for 21 weeks, becoming Simon's biggest hit of the 1990s. A second single, "Holding Me Tonight", was also a successful Adult Contemporary chart hit, peaking at No. 36. That same year, Simon published her second children's book, The Boy of the Bells.

In 1991, she wrote her third children's book, The Fisherman's Song, which was based on the song of the same name from her 1990 album Have You Seen Me Lately. That same year, Simon performed a duet with Plácido Domingo on the song "The Last Night of the World" (from the stage musical Miss Saigon) on Domingo's album The Broadway I Love. In 1992, Simon wrote the music for the Nora Ephron film This Is My Life, and the soundtrack album was released shortly thereafter. It includes the song "Love of My Life", a No. 16 Adult Contemporary hit. In 1993, she contributed her performance of "In the Wee Small Hours of the Morning", from her 1990 album My Romance, to the Nora Ephron film Sleepless in Seattle. It was also included on the film's soundtrack album. Simon recorded the same song in combination with "Guess I'll Hang My Tears Out to Dry" with Frank Sinatra for his album Duets (1993). By this point, Sinatra's health was too poor for him to record, so the feat was accomplished by producers lifting an isolated prerecorded vocal track from an earlier performance and laying a new background – and Simon – behind it. The album later earned a nomination for Best Traditional Pop Vocal Performance at the 37th Annual Grammy Awards.

In 1993, Simon was commissioned by the Metropolitan Opera Association and the Kennedy Center to record a contemporary opera that would appeal to younger people. The result was Romulus Hunt (named after its 12-year-old protagonist), released in November of that year. In December 2014, the Nashville Opera Association premiered a new performance edition of the opera. Also in 1993, Simon published her fourth children's book, The Nighttime Chauffeur, and contributed to Swiss musician Andreas Vollenweider's album Eolian Minstrel; she co-wrote the song "Private Fires" with Vollenweider, and was featured vocalist on the song. Simon wrote and performed the theme song, titled "The Promise and the Prize", for the short-lived sitcom Phenom (1993–1994).

In 1994, she covered the song "Take Me Out to the Ball Game" for Ken Burns' film Baseball, as well as a recording of "I've Got a Crush on You" for Larry Adler's tribute album The Glory of Gershwin. That same year, Simon recorded and released her 16th album, Letters Never Sent. The album originated from Simon finding an old box of letters that she'd written, but never mailed, and she set a handful of them to music. Entertainment Weekly stated "The results are funky, fascinating, and sumptuous. A daring move that pays off." From the album, Simon wrote "Like A River" in honor of her mother, Andrea Simon, and "Touched by the Sun" for her dear friend, Jackie Onassis, both of whom died from cancer in 1994. The song "The Night Before Christmas", originally written for the 1992 Nora Ephron film This Is My Life and featured on the soundtrack album, was also featured in Ephron's 1994 film Mixed Nuts, as well as its soundtrack album. That same year, Simon released Bells, Bears and Fishermen, a spoken word recording of her first three children's books: Amy the Dancing Bear, The Boy of the Bells, and The Fisherman's Song, complete with sound effects and original music.

=== 1995–1999: Grand Central concert, Film Noir, and breast cancer ===
In April 1995, Simon surprised thousands of commuters at New York's Grand Central Terminal with an unannounced performance that was filmed for a Lifetime television special, titled Live at Grand Central. It was also released on home video in December of that year. It was re-released on Blu-ray, Vinyl and CD on January 27, 2023. Simon also featured in an episode of the Lifetime original series Intimate Portrait, which was broadcast the same night. Also in 1995, she performed on an American concert tour in conjunction with Hall & Oates. On August 30, 1995, Simon made a rare joint appearance with her ex-husband, James Taylor, for a concert on Martha's Vineyard. Dubbed "Livestock '95", it was a benefit for the Martha's Vineyard Agricultural Society, with over 10,000 people in attendance. Simon performed a duet with Mindy Jostyn on the song "Time, Be on My Side", which featured on Jostyn's 1995 album Five Miles from Hope about her recent battle with colon cancer. Ten years later, Jostyn died from the disease at the age of 43. On November 7, 1995, Simon released the three-disc boxed set Clouds in My Coffee. A full career retrospective at the time of its release, the box set features 58 songs spanning Simon's career from 1965 to 1995. Nine tracks were previously unreleased on any of Simon's albums, and the booklet includes numerous photographs and extensive liner notes by Simon. That same year, Simon and her sister Lucy sang on the track "The Great Mandala (The Wheel of Life)" from Peter, Paul and Mary's album LifeLines.

In November 1995, the American press reported an incident between Simon and the Pretenders' vocalist Chrissie Hynde at a Joni Mitchell concert at New York's Fez Club. Some reports stated that a drunk and disorderly Hynde grabbed Simon around the neck and punched her, although Simon attempted to put these rumors to rest on her official website in 2002, writing "Chrissie was a bit intoxicated and was yelling out during Joni's performance which needless to say, everybody wanted to hear. Chrissie was sitting right next to me and I asked her to be a little quieter. She started choking me in a loving way, saying: 'you're great too Carly, get up there, you need to do this too'. That's all it was about. I must say that her choking me in 'fun intoxication' looked to a lot of the audience like a fight. It was not. I just couldn't believe that no one was interceding and saying anything to her. I love her music and respect her as an artist. It was just one of those things. Go figure."

Simon continued to write and record music for films, and wrote the theme songs to several more movies; these included "Two Little Sisters" from the drama film Marvin's Room (1996), and "In Two Straight Lines" from the family comedy Madeline (1998). She released her fifth children's book, Midnight Farm, on August 1, 1997. Simon's third standards album, Film Noir, was released on September 16, 1997. Recorded in collaboration with Jimmy Webb (who duets with Simon on the track "Spring Will Be a Little Late This Year"), the album was nominated for the Best Traditional Pop Vocal Performance the following year. John Travolta duets with Simon on the track "Two Sleepy People", and Martin Scorsese penned the liner notes featured in the album's booklet. Songs in Shadow: The Making of Carly Simon's Film Noir aired as a special presentation on AMC. This documentary also features footage of Webb, Arif Mardin and Van Dyke Parks in the studio recording the album with Simon.

Simon was diagnosed with breast cancer in October 1997, and underwent surgery, as well as chemotherapy; "I was in the hospital for one night," Simon said, "Because they got everything during the procedure, and the prognosis was good, my doctor gave me the option of whether to have chemo. I decided to play it safe." The following year, the single-disc UK import The Very Best of Carly Simon: Nobody Does It Better was released, and became a UK Albums Chart hit, peaking at No. 22. In 1999, Simon worked again with Andreas Vollenweider, and was the featured vocalist for the song "Your Silver Key" on Vollenweider's album Cosmopoly. That same year, Simon and her daughter Sally Taylor contributed the track "Amity" to the soundtrack album of the film Anywhere but Here.

=== 2000–2002: The Bedroom Tapes, departure from Arista, and Christmas album ===
On May 16, 2000, Simon released her 18th studio album, The Bedroom Tapes. Largely written and recorded at home in her bedroom while she was recuperating from her health problems of the previous couple of years, it was Simon's first album of original songs since Letters Never Sent, nearly six years earlier. The Bedroom Tapes peaked at only No. 90 on the Billboard 200, but received widespread critical acclaim. AllMusic wrote that Simon was "as raw as she was on 1975's Playing Possum, and just as sweet as 1987's Coming Around Again, but Simon is fresh. Although in her mid-fifties, she is still a charmer." Writing for Billboard, Steve Baltin called the album "A feast for fans of intelligent, richly crafted pop music", while People wrote that the album "unfolds like a one-woman show", calling it a "Boffo performance." The opening track, "Our Affair", was remixed by Richard Perry and featured on the soundtrack album of the 2000 film Bounce, starring Gwyneth Paltrow and Ben Affleck.

In 2001, Simon performed on "Son of a Gun" with Janet Jackson on Jackson's album All for You. According to Jackson, she phoned Simon to ask for permission to use samples of "You're So Vain", but Simon wanted to re-record her vocals. She agreed, with Simon wanting to write new lines. Jackson's producer Jimmy Jam sent her the tracks they were already working on, and she went into a studio on Martha's Vineyard to record some material. She rapped, initially thinking that Jackson and the producers would not use it, but they decided to marry both tracks, as the singers thought it "worked perfectly", and it became a duet. Simon expressed that Jackson "could not have been sweeter or more appreciative." The song was released as a single and peaked at No. 28 on the Billboard Hot 100. Simon also contributed backup vocals on two songs, "Don't Turn Away" and "East of Eden", for Mindy Jostyn's 2001 album Blue Stories. In November 2001, Simon's Oscar-winning song "Let the River Run" was used in a public service ad for the United States Postal Service. Titled "Pride", it was produced to boost public confidence and postal worker morale in the wake of the September 11, 2001, attacks and the 2001 anthrax attacks.

In January 2002, Simon recorded a Christmas album, Christmas Is Almost Here, while she was in Los Angeles to lend support to her son Ben Taylor and his band. It was released by Rhino Records that October. That same year, Simon personally chose all of the songs for a new two-disc anthology album, simply titled Anthology. This release represented every one of her studio albums (up until that point) with at least one song, digitally remastered, and also released on Rhino Records. The following year saw a re-release of her Christmas album with two extra tracks: "White Christmas" (with Burt Bacharach) and "Forgive" (with Andreas Vollenweider). These two tracks were also released together as a CD single. She also performed two concerts during the 2004 holiday season at Harlem's Apollo Theater, along with BeBe Winans, Rob Thomas, son Ben and daughter Sally, Livingston Taylor, Mindy Jostyn and Kate Taylor, along with other members of the Taylor and Simon family.

=== 2003–2007: Reflections, move to Columbia, and commercial resurgence ===
Simon wrote and recorded songs for the Disney Winnie the Pooh films Piglet's Big Movie in 2003 and Pooh's Heffalump Movie in 2005, as well as the direct-to-video A Very Merry Pooh Year in 2002. Several of her songs were also featured in the 2004 film Little Black Book, which starred Brittany Murphy and Holly Hunter, with Simon appearing as herself in a cameo role at the end of the film. In the spring of 2004, Simon released her fourth greatest hits album: Reflections: Carly Simon's Greatest Hits. The album was a great critical and commercial success, peaking at No. 22 on the Billboard 200, and remaining on the chart for 19 weeks. On March 2, 2007, the album was certified Gold by the RIAA. An international version of the album was also released; it hit No. 25 on the UK charts and went Gold there as well. Also in 2004, Simon performed a duet version of "The Right Thing to Do" with Megan Mullally for the TV soundtrack Will & Grace: Let the Music Out!.

In the summer of 2005, Simon released her fourth album of standards, Moonlight Serenade, on Columbia Records. A critical and commercial success, it reached No. 7 on the Billboard 200 (her first Top 10 album on this chart since Boys in the Trees in 1978), and she was nominated for the Grammy Award for Best Traditional Pop Vocal Album the following year. To promote Moonlight Serenade, Simon performed two concerts on board the RMS Queen Mary 2 that September, which were recorded and released on DVD as A Moonlight Serenade on the Queen Mary 2 on November 22, 2005. Accompanied by her children, Sally and Ben, Simon embarked on a concert tour across the United States—her first tour in 10 years, titled "The Serenade Tour". She also sang a duet, "Angel of the Darkest Night", with Mindy Jostyn on Jostyn's 2005 album Coming Home. The album was released several months after Jostyn's death on March 10, 2005. One of Simon's closest friends, Jostyn was married to Jacob Brackman, Simon's long-time friend and musical collaborator. In 2005, Simon became involved in the legal defense of musician and family friend John Forté with his struggle against a federal incarceration.

Simon again teamed up with Andreas Vollenweider for his 2006 holiday album, Midnight Clear, performing vocals on four tracks: "Midnight Clear", "Suspended Note", "Hymn to the Secret Heart", and "Forgive" (which was a song Simon wrote for the 2003 re-release of her own holiday album Christmas Is Almost Here). Also in 2006, Simon performed with Livingston Taylor on his album There You Are Again, singing on the opening track "Best of Friends", which became a Top 40 Adult Contemporary hit.

In 2007, Simon released her fifth album of covers, a collection of "soothing songs and lullabies" called Into White. The collection featured covers of songs by Cat Stevens, the Beatles, Judy Garland, and the Everly Brothers, as well as two new original songs, "Quiet Evening" and "I'll Just Remember You", and a re-recording of Simon's own "Love of My Life". The album also features vocal collaborations with her children; Ben and Sally, who perform a trio with Simon on the track "You Can Close Your Eyes", which author Sheila Weller described in her 2008 book Girls Like Us as "slow, spectral" and "achingly beautiful." People also praised the track, describing it as "dreamy", and calling it "the best moment on the album." Into White continued Simon's recently rejuvenated high chart profile, and became Billboard's Hot Shot Debut, entering the chart at No. 15, peaking at No. 13 the following week, and remaining on the chart for 10 weeks.

=== 2008–2011: This Kind of Love and Never Been Gone ===
In March 2008, it was announced that Simon had signed with the Starbucks label, Hear Music. She released a new album titled This Kind of Love with them in the spring of 2008. The album was her first collection of all original songs since 2000's The Bedroom Tapes, and it became another commercial and critical success for Simon, reaching No. 15 on the Billboard 200, and selling nearly 150,000 copies by 2009. On June 19, 2008, Simon and her son Ben performed "You're So Vain" together on The Howard Stern Show on Sirius Satellite radio. On October 13, 2009, it was reported that Simon was suing Starbucks, saying they did not adequately promote This Kind of Love. Simon's lawsuit stated that Starbucks publicly announced it was backing out of participation in Hear Music just days before the album came out—a decision that she claimed doomed the record before it was even released.

On October 27, 2009, Simon released her 23rd album, Never Been Gone, on Iris Records. An album of acoustic reworkings of some of her greatest hits and classic songs, it also features two new songs: "No Freedom" and "Songbird". On November 26, 2009, Simon appeared on the Care Bears float of the 83rd Annual Macy's Thanksgiving Day Parade, where she performed an acoustic version of her hit "Let the River Run".

On March 2, 2010, BBC Radio 2 broadcast An Evening With Carly Simon, where she performed live for the first time in the UK with her son Ben Taylor to a small audience of approximately 100 people. This coincided with the UK release of Simon's album Never Been Gone, which was released for the Mother's Day season and peaked at No. 45, becoming her first studio album to reach the UK Albums Chart Top 100 since 1987's Coming Around Again. Simon also appeared on various UK television shows to promote the album, including The One Show and BBC Breakfast. That same year, Simon contributed the track "Calls a Soft Voice" to Arif Mardin's album All My Friends Are Here.

=== 2012–2019: ASCAP Founders Award, collaborations, and memoirs ===
On April 18, 2012, Simon was honored with the Founders Award from the American Society of Composers, Authors and Publishers. She performed "Anticipation" and "You're So Vain" at the ceremony. Bill Withers presented Simon with her award and honored her with a speech, and Dixie Chicks lead singer Natalie Maines performed Simon's 1971 hit "That's the Way I've Always Heard It Should Be". That same year, Simon contributed the track "Just Like a Woman" to the Bob Dylan tribute album Chimes of Freedom. Proceeds from the album were donated to the human rights organization Amnesty International.

On July 27, 2013, in Foxborough, Massachusetts, Simon performed "You're So Vain" with Taylor Swift on her Red Tour. Swift had previously cited Simon as a musical influence and "You're So Vain" as one of her favorite songs. Later that year, Simon dueted with Jimmy Webb on the track "Easy for You to Say" from his album Still Within the Sound of My Voice. On October 30, 2013, Simon performed alongside Natasha Bedingfield at the Oceana Partners Award Gala in Los Angeles.

On November 24, 2015, Simon published Boys in the Trees: A Memoir, an autobiographical book focusing on her childhood and her early life, from age five until the year 1983. The book was met with widespread critical acclaim, and Billboard later ranked it No. 50 on their list of the 100 Greatest Music Books of All Time. The two-disc compilation album Songs from the Trees (A Musical Memoir Collection) was simultaneously released along with the book. The album features songs written and/or recorded during the era the book covers, as well as two previously unreleased songs: "Showdown" (originally recorded during the sessions for Simon's 1978 album Boys in the Trees) and "I Can't Thank You Enough", a brand new song written and performed with her son Ben Taylor.

On February 14, 2016, Simon made a surprise appearance at Clive Davis's Pre-Grammy Party and performed "You're So Vain", which drew a "thunderous standing ovation", and appeared in Davis' Grammy Party Class Photo. Later that year, Simon confirmed during a book signing that she and her son Ben Taylor were working to release EDM remixes of her signature songs. She also said she wanted to record an album with her two children.

In April 2017, Simon featured on the deluxe edition of the Gorillaz album Humanz, on the track "Ticker Tape". That same year, BBC Four broadcast the documentary Carly Simon: No Secrets as part of their Classic Albums series. It details the making of the album No Secrets, and includes interviews with Simon, producer Richard Perry, and many of the main musicians and production staff. The following year, Simon came to terms with the Universal Music Publishing Group to administer her song portfolio.

On October 22, 2019, Simon released a second memoir titled Touched by the Sun: My Friendship with Jackie, which recounts her friendship with former First Lady Jacqueline Kennedy Onassis. As a tie-in to its release, Simon also released a newly mixed live version of "Touched by the Sun" from her 1995 concert special Live at Grand Central as a single. The book was selected by People as one of the top 10 books of 2019.

=== 2020–present: Carnegie Hall tribute, Rock and Roll Hall of Fame induction, and Comes in Waves ===
On November 27, 2019, it was announced that Simon would be honored at Carnegie Hall with a tribute concert, titled The Music of Carly Simon, on March 19, 2020. On March 12, 2020, it was announced the concert had been postponed until fall due to the COVID-19 pandemic. It was later rescheduled to take place on March 23, 2022, before being cancelled altogether due to COVID-19–related challenges.

On February 2, 2022, Simon was announced as one of the 17 performers nominated for the Rock and Roll Hall of Fame Class of 2022. On May 4, 2022, Simon was announced as one of the seven artists in the performer category being inducted. In an interview with Rolling Stone, Simon stated "There's that first thought of, 'I don't believe it. It must be the House of Pancakes I just got into.' Truly, I was dumbfounded. I thought they must be mistaken." Simon even jokingly theorized that the reason for being shut out of the Rock and Roll Hall of Fame despite being eligible for 26 years prior was due to a her cameo scene in the 1985 film Perfect where she had to throw a drink at star John Travolta's face in a restaurant with Rolling Stone publisher (and Hall of Fame co-founder/former Hall chairman) Jann Wenner, who also had cameo in the same scene; looking on, to which described their friendship as being "awkward" afterwards. When asked about the possibility of performing at the ceremony, Simon stated "I don't know. I'm not going to put myself onstage and scare the hell out of myself." Simon said she'd like Cat Stevens or Robbie Robertson to induct her: "Those are the two people who were instrumental in my first solo light."

On November 5, 2022, Simon was inducted into the Rock and Roll Hall of Fame. She was unable to attend the ceremony due to personal tragedy. Sara Bareilles, who inducted Simon, read a note from her stating: "I am humbled, shocked, proud, over-achieved, under-qualified and singularly grateful to everyone without whom I really couldn't be here." Bareilles then performed "Nobody Does It Better", followed by Olivia Rodrigo, who performed "You're So Vain".

It was announced on July 12, 2023, that the compilation album These Are the Good Old Days: The Carly Simon and Jac Holzman Story would be released on CD and Vinyl on September 15, 2023. The collection features a mix of hits and deep cuts selected from Simon's first three albums, chosen and sequenced by Holzman.

On June 11, 2026, Simon announced her 24th studio album Comes in Waves, along with the release of the lead single "Howl". It marks her first studio album featuring original music since This Kind of Love in 2008. Comes in Waves was released on August 14, 2026, and received positive reviews from critics.

== Personal life ==
In the 1960s, Simon was briefly engaged to British writer William Donaldson. Donaldson described her as "the answer to any sane man's prayers; funny, quick, erotic, extravagantly talented."

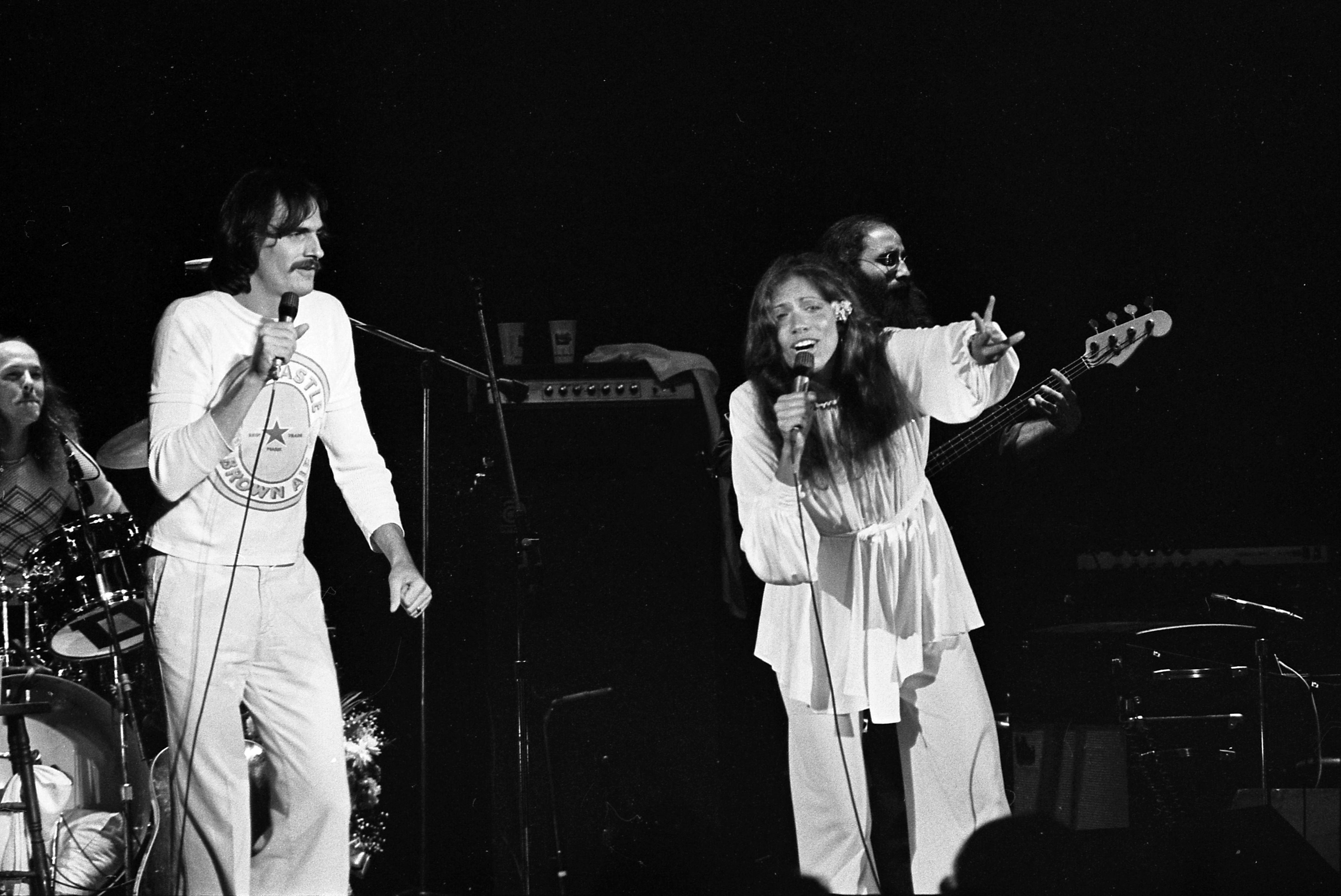
Simon and Taylor in concert, 1975. They were married from 1972 to 1983.

Simon married fellow singer-songwriter James Taylor on November 3, 1972, in New York City, where they lived at the time. They have two children including Sarah "Sally" Maria Taylor. Simon and Taylor divorced in 1983. In June 2004, Simon said that she no longer speaks to her ex-husband. "I would say our relationship is non-existent. It's not the way I want it." In 2015, following the publication of her memoir Boys in the Trees, Simon reiterated in an interview that she and Taylor had not spoken in decades, saying, "I still want to heal him, I still want to make him all right. And I love him so much."

From 1972 to 1979, Simon sang backup vocals on the following James Taylor songs and studio albums: "One Man Parade" from One Man Dog (1972). "Rock 'n' Roll Is Music Now", "Let It All Fall Down", "Me and My Guitar", "Daddy's Baby", and "Ain't No Song" from Walking Man (1974). "How Sweet It Is" from Gorilla (1975). "Shower the People", "A Junkie's Lament", "Slow Burning Love", and "Family Man" from In the Pocket (1976). "Terra Nova" (which she co-wrote with Taylor) from JT (1977). "B.S.U.R." from Flag (1979).

She was engaged to musician Russ Kunkel, from 1985 to 1986. The pair became romantically involved during the making of Simon's album Spoiled Girl.

Simon married James Hart, a writer, poet and businessman, on December 23, 1987. The couple divorced in 2007.

Simon underwent a mastectomy, chemotherapy, and reconstructive surgery for breast cancer between 1997 and 1998. There had been a lump in her breast for several years, but her doctors had advised against surgery. She later recounted: "Then one doctor said, 'You know what, I'd rather see it in a jar than in your breast.'" She also said that she felt "a little angry with [herself]" that she did not insist on taking it out sooner. Her surgery came at the same time as the death of her long-time friend Linda McCartney, who had also had breast cancer. Simon described McCartney's death as having emotionally "crushed" her. Simon has had osteopenia since at least the age of 61, which has resulted in her avoidance of high-heeled shoes in order to escape discomfort. She revealed in 2026 that she had been diagnosed with Parkinson's disease and has undergone treatment for basal-cell carcinoma.

Simon has been close friends with James Taylor's younger brother Livingston Taylor for over 40 years. Livingston said, "I love Carly and Carly loves me. She's a ferocious advocate and supporter of my music." They have worked as a musical duo for some songs such as "Best of Friends", released in Livingston's 2006 album There You Are Again, and others earlier in their careers.

In May 2010, Simon stated she had been one of the several celebrities who fell victim to financial advisor Kenneth I. Starr, whose Ponzi scheme lured her into "investing" millions of dollars with him, which she lost.

In 2008, Simon was reportedly dating Richard Koehler, a surgeon specializing in minimally invasive laparoscopy. The pair were reported to have been dating as early as 2006. In 2015, the two were reportedly living together on Martha's Vineyard.

In October 2016, Simon donated the rights to "You're So Vain" for use in an anti-Donald Trump political attack ad. Simon had long chosen to keep her political views private and had never allowed "You're So Vain" to be used for political purposes in the past. As a reason for changing that, Simon cited the recently released Access Hollywood tape, in which Trump can be heard bragging on a hot mic about his behavior towards married women that commentators and lawyers have described as sexual assault. Simultaneously, Simon announced her opposition to Trump's candidacy in the upcoming 2016 U.S. presidential election. Simon cited the tape as what motivated her for the first time in her career to publicly take a political stance.

Simon's brother, Peter Simon, died from lung cancer on November 18, 2018. Peter Simon was 71 years old. In October 2022, Simon lost both of her sisters to cancer within a day of each other. Joanna Simon died on October 19, 2022, from thyroid cancer and Lucy Simon died the next day on October 20, 2022, from metastatic breast cancer. Joanna Simon was 85 years old and Lucy Simon was 82 years old.

== Achievements, artistry, and legacy ==
=== Recognition ===
Simon has received various accolades and honors throughout her career, including two Grammy Awards (from 14 nominations), an Academy Award, and a Golden Globe Award. She received two consecutive British Academy Film Award nominations for Best Original Film Score, in 1990 and 1991, respectively. She has received eight Boston Music Award nominations and three wins, as well as the Hall of Fame Lifetime Achievement in 1995.

In 1994, Simon was inducted into the Songwriters Hall of Fame. In 1998, she received the Berklee College of Music Honorary Doctor of Music Degree. In 1999, Simon ranked at No. 28 on VH1's 100 Greatest Women in Rock & Roll. In 2005, Simon was nominated for a star on the Hollywood Walk of Fame, but a date was never set for the ceremony and she has yet to claim her star. In 2012, she was honored with the Founders Award from the American Society of Composers, Authors and Publishers (ASCAP). In 2017, Billboard ranked Simon at No. 50 on their list of the Greatest of All-Time Hot 100 Women Artists. Simon was set to be honored at Carnegie Hall with a tribute concert on March 19, 2020, but it was postponed due to the COVID-19 pandemic. It was rescheduled to take place on March 23, 2022, before being cancelled altogether due to COVID-19–related challenges. In 2022, Simon was inducted into the Rock and Roll Hall of Fame. In 2023, Billboard ranked Simon at No. 31 on their list of the greatest adult contemporary artists of all time.

In 1991, Playing Possum ranked No. 20 on Rolling Stone's list of the 100 Classic Album Covers. In 2000, No Secrets ranked No. 997 in All Time Top 1000 Albums (3rd. edition). In 2001, "You're So Vain" ranked No. 216 in RIAA's Songs of the Century. In 2004, "You're So Vain" was inducted into the Grammy Hall of Fame. That same year, "Nobody Does It Better" ranked at No. 67 and "Let the River Run" ranked at No. 91 on AFI's 100 Years...100 Songs, a list of the top 100 songs in American cinema of the 20th century. In 2008, Billboard Hot 100 50th Anniversary Charts named the All-Time Top 100 Songs which included "You're So Vain" at No. 72. "Nobody Does It Better" ranked No. 3 on Rolling Stone's list, and No. 2 on Billboard's list, of the Top 10 James Bond Theme Songs in 2012. The following year, Billboard Hot 100 55th Anniversary Charts: The All-Time Top 100 Songs, updated its ranking and placed "You're So Vain" at No. 82. In 2014, UK Official Charts Company crowned "You're So Vain" the ultimate song of the 1970s. In 2015, Pitchfork ranked "Why" at No. 188 on their list of the 200 Best Songs of the 1980s. In 2016, Simon's memoir Boys in the Trees ranked No. 50 on Billboard's list of the 100 Greatest Music Books of All Time. In 2021, USA Today crowned "Nobody Does it Better" the greatest James Bond Theme Song, and "You're So Vain" ranked No. 495 on Rolling Stone's 500 Greatest Songs of All Time.

=== Covers and tributes ===
Simon's songs have been widely covered by other musicians; the Rock and Roll Hall of Fame wrote that her "influence on fellow artists is incalculable." Notable among the many artists covering "You're So Vain" is Marilyn Manson's unusual version featuring Johnny Depp on guitar. Taylor Swift brought Simon onstage to share "You're So Vain" as a duet at the Foxborough date during Swift's Red Tour in 2013. Swift had previously called the track "the best song that's ever been written." In May 2021, Dave Grohl stated that the song "still amazes" him; his band Foo Fighters previously covered the song at the "Grammy Nominations Concert Live!!" in 2008.

"Nobody Does It Better" has been performed live by Celine Dion and Radiohead; indeed, Radiohead's lead singer, Thom Yorke, called it the "sexiest song ever written." Tori Amos said that Simon's song "Boys in the Trees" (the title track of Boys in the Trees) inspired her own songwriting efforts, and Amos has performed the song in concert.

=== In popular culture ===
Simon is one of the various artists mentioned in the 1974 Reunion song "Life Is a Rock (But the Radio Rolled Me)". Groovie Ghoulies recorded a song simply titled "Carly Simon", which was released on their 1999 album Fun in the Dark.

Simon appeared as herself in the films Perfect (1985) and Little Black Book (2004). On television, she appeared as herself in a 1989 episode of thirtysomething, titled "Success". In 1995, she made a voice cameo as a caller named Marie on a season two episode of Frasier, titled "Roz in the Doghouse". In 2013, she appeared as herself in the Family Guy episode "Total Recall".

The fifth-season premiere episode of Bob's Burgers, "Work Hard or Die Trying, Girl", involves Gene Belcher and his sometime friend Courtney Wheeler staging separate, and then ultimately unified, stage reenactments of the films Die Hard and Working Girl, with Courtney's father Doug promising to enlist Carly Simon to appear at his daughter's performance. Simon provides an uncredited voice cameo at the end, singing the ersatz theme song to the children's combined musical.

=== Influence on other artists ===
Taylor Swift said of Simon: "She has always been known for her songwriting and her honesty. She's known as an emotional person but a strong person. I really, really look up to that. I admire her. I think she's always been beautiful and natural and seems to do it all effortlessly. There's nothing more attractive than someone who seems to live effortlessly." Carly Rae Jepsen was also influenced by Simon, stating: "In truth I think I'm inspired by her for many reasons. I think her music is amazing," adding: "I love the way she writes. I think it's really relatable and honest. And I love her fashion sense." Brittany Murphy considered Simon her idol, once stating: "I have always been acquainted with Carly's catalogue, to say the least. She's the most tremendous woman. She's a force of nature. She's just a delight."

Tori Amos cited Simon as an influence, and often covers "Boys in the Trees" in concert; "I used to listen to this song over and over, wishing I'd wrote it," Amos once said of the track. At the 2012 ASCAP awards, where Simon received the Founders Award, Dixie Chicks lead singer Natalie Maines stated: "I grew up listening to Carly Simon, she was a huge influence on me." Maines then performed "That's the Way I've Always Heard It Should Be", which she said was one of her favorite Carly Simon songs. In a 2021 essay for Rolling Stone, Clairo wrote of Simon: "Every time I listen to her, I feel like she's talking to me directly or saying something that took a lot of courage to build up to say." She continued: "There's nothing you could add or take away from her legacy, because she's always been truthful," concluding with "the fact that she was always so upfront about everything that wasn't perfect, I think, is what makes her the most important to me." Sara Bareilles, while inducting Simon into the Rock and Roll Hall of Fame, stated: "Like so many singer-songwriters who have come after her, I too have felt the powerful impact of Carly Simon and been made better for it."

== Discography ==
=== Studio albums ===
- 1971: Carly Simon
- 1971: Anticipation
- 1972: No Secrets
- 1974: Hotcakes
- 1975: Playing Possum
- 1976: Another Passenger
- 1978: Boys in the Trees
- 1979: Spy
- 1980: Come Upstairs
- 1981: Torch
- 1983: Hello Big Man
- 1985: Spoiled Girl
- 1987: Coming Around Again
- 1990: My Romance
- 1990: Have You Seen Me Lately
- 1994: Letters Never Sent
- 1997: Film Noir
- 2000: The Bedroom Tapes
- 2005: Moonlight Serenade
- 2007: Into White
- 2008: This Kind of Love
- 2009: Never Been Gone
- 2026: Comes in Waves

=== Christmas albums ===
- 2002: Christmas Is Almost Here

=== Live albums ===
- 1988: Greatest Hits Live
- 2023: Live at Grand Central

=== Other albums ===
- 1989: Working Girl (Original Soundtrack Album)
- 1992: This Is My Life (Music from the Motion Picture)
- 1993: Romulus Hunt: A Family Opera
- 2003: Piglet's Big Movie (soundtrack)
- 2005: The Best of Pooh and Heffalumps, Too

=== Compilation albums ===
- 1975: The Best of Carly Simon
- 1995: Clouds in My Coffee
- 1998: The Very Best of Carly Simon: Nobody Does It Better
- 2002: Anthology
- 2004: Reflections: Carly Simon's Greatest Hits
- 2009: Carly Simon Collector's Edition
- 2011: Original Album Series
- 2014: Playlist: The Very Best of Carly Simon
- 2015: Songs from the Trees: A Musical Memoir Collection
- 2023: These Are the Good Old Days: The Carly Simon and Jac Holzman Story

== Filmography ==
=== Concert films ===
- 1987: Live from Martha's Vineyard
- 1990: Carly in Concert: My Romance
- 1995: Live at Grand Central
- 2005: A Moonlight Serenade on the Queen Mary 2

=== Film ===
- 1971: Taking Off (cameo)
- 1980: No Nukes (performer)
- 1985: Perfect (cameo)
- 2004: Little Black Book (cameo)
- 2006: Christa McAuliffe: Reach for the Stars (music)

=== Television ===
- 1976: Saturday Night Live episode: "Madeline Kahn/Carly Simon" (musical guest)
- 1989: Thirtysomething episode: "Success" (cameo)
- 1995: Frasier episode: "Roz in the Doghouse" (voice role)
- 2013: Family Guy episode: "Total Recall" (voice role)
- 2014: Bob's Burgers episode: "Work Hard or Die Trying, Girl" (voice role)

== Bibliography ==
=== Children's books ===
- 1989: Amy the Dancing Bear
- 1990: The Boy of the Bells
- 1991: The Fisherman's Song
- 1993: The Nighttime Chauffeur
- 1997: Midnight Farm

=== Memoirs ===
- 2015: Boys in the Trees: A Memoir
- 2019: Touched by the Sun: My Friendship with Jackie

=== Biographies ===
- 2008: Girls Like Us: Carole King, Joni Mitchell, Carly Simon and the Journey of a Generation by Sheila Weller
- 2011: More Room in a Broken Heart: The True Adventures of Carly Simon by Stephen Davis

== Certifications ==
The years given are the years the albums and singles were released, and not necessarily the years in which they achieved their peak.

U.S. Billboard 200 Top 10 Albums

- 1972 – No Secrets (No. 1)
- 1974 – Hotcakes (No. 3)
- 1975 – Playing Possum (No. 10)
- 1978 – Boys in the Trees (No. 10)
- 2005 – Moonlight Serenade (No. 7)

U.S. Billboard Hot 100 Top 10 Singles

- 1971 – "That's the Way I've Always Heard It Should Be" (No. 10)
- 1972 – "You're So Vain" (No. 1)
- 1974 – "Mockingbird" (No. 5)
- 1977 – "Nobody Does It Better" (No. 2)
- 1978 – "You Belong to Me" (No. 6)

U.S. Billboard Adult Contemporary Top 10 Singles

- 1971 – "That's the Way I've Always Heard It Should Be" (No. 6)
- 1971 – "Anticipation" (No. 3)
- 1972 – "You're So Vain" (No. 1)
- 1972 – "The Right Thing to Do" (No. 4)
- 1974 – "Mockingbird" (No. 10)
- 1974 – "Haven't Got Time for the Pain" (No. 2)
- 1977 – "Nobody Does It Better" (No. 1)
- 1978 – "You Belong to Me" (No. 4)
- 1978 – "Devoted to You" (No. 2)
- 1980 – "Jesse" (No. 8)
- 1987 – "Coming Around Again" (No. 5)
- 1987 – "Give Me All Night" (No. 5)
- 1987 – "The Stuff That Dreams Are Made Of" (No. 8)
- 1987 – "All I Want Is You" (No. 7)
- 1990 – "Better Not Tell Her" (No. 4)
- 2005 – "Let It Snow" (No. 6)

Albums and singles certifications (RIAA)

| Song title | Certification |
|---|---|
| "You're So Vain" | Gold |
| "Mockingbird" | Gold |
| "Nobody Does It Better" | Gold |
| "Jesse" | Gold |
| Album title | Certification |
| Anticipation | Gold |
| No Secrets | Platinum |
| Hotcakes | Gold |
| The Best of Carly Simon | 3× Platinum |
| Boys in the Trees | Platinum |
| Coming Around Again | Platinum |
| Greatest Hits Live | Platinum |
| Reflections: Carly Simon's Greatest Hits | Gold |
