= Boys in the Trees (memoir) =

2015 memoir by Carly Simon

Boys in the Trees: A Memoir
- Author: Carly Simon
- Genre: Memoir
- Publisher: Flatiron Books
- Publication date: November 24, 2015
- Pages: 376
- ISBN: 978-1-250-09589-3

Boys in the Trees is a memoir by American singer-songwriter Carly Simon.

== Publication ==
Boys in the Trees was published on November 24, 2015 by Flatiron Books. The book is titled after Simon's 1978 album, Boys in the Trees. A two-disc compilation album, Songs From The Trees (A Musical Memoir Collection), was released on November 20, 2015 to accompany the memoir, and includes a previously unreleased track entitled "Showdown", which was originally recorded during the Boys in the Trees sessions.

== Content ==
Reviewing Boys in the Trees, Fiona Sturges describes the book as "primarily about [Simon's] family, her interior life and her stormy relationships with men, and her candour is frequently startling." Simon describes her early life as the child of privileged parents (her father Richard L. Simon founded the publishing company Simon & Schuster). She documents a line of failed boyfriends and an eventual marriage to musician James Taylor. Although she was happy to be "Mrs. James Taylor" and they had two children together, the marriage ultimately dissolved. Simon also revealed in the memoir that when she was seven years old, a family friend in his teens sexually assaulted her: "It was heinous", she stated, adding, "It changed my view about sex for a long time."

The book concludes in the mid-1980s, shortly after the release of Simon's 11th studio album Hello Big Man (1983).

== Reception ==
The book received predominantly favorable reviews, with some exceptions. In The Guardian, Jude Rogers wrote "Complex, quick-witted and stack-full of raw talent: this isn't how people like to see Carly Simon. After all, [Simon] was also the long-legged, hyena-mouthed lover of many famous men (William Donaldson, writer of the Henry Root letters, Kris Kristofferson, Mick Jagger and Jack Nicholson, for starters), and the wayward daughter of a publishing icon Richard, the Simon of Simon & Schuster. These boys in the trees, and many more, follow her, dog her and haunt her. Her process of shaking them free forms the foundations of this brilliant memoir." Similarly, in The Independent, Fiona Sturges found Boys in the Trees a "hugely affecting memoir", describing Simon's recounting "as, for the most part, heartfelt and remarkable in [its] detail...Similarly impressive is the fearlessness, frankness and wisdom with which she chronicles half a lifetime of pain." However, in The New York Times, Janet Maslin found the "book's style recalls that of [Simon's] songs: a little precious, a little redundant, a little too much." In 2016, Billboard ranked the book No. 50 on list of the 100 Greatest Music Books of All Time.
