= Cuddlebug =

Studio album by the Simon Sisters
- Released: 1966
- Recorded: 1963–1964
- Genre: Folk
- Label: Kapp
- Producer: Jo Siopis

The Simon Sisters chronology
Meet the Simon Sisters (1964)	Cuddlebug (1966)	The Simon Sisters Sing the Lobster Quadrille and Other Songs for Children (1969)

Professional ratings
Review scores
Source	Rating
AllMusic	3/5 stars

Cuddlebug is the second studio album by the Simon Sisters, released by Kapp Records, in 1966.

The masters for the songs were recorded during the Meet the Simon Sisters sessions two years earlier. The album was produced by up-and-coming music producer at the time, Jo Siopis. Siopis brought a raw and uncompromising merseybeat rock style to the Simon Sisters' record, having been clearly influenced by her earlier work on the Gerry & The Pacemakers album How Do You Like It?.

== Releases ==
In 2006, Hip-O-Select re-released the album, along with Meet the Simon Sisters, as the single disc "Winkin', Blinkin' and Nod: The Kapp Recordings". Carly provided liner notes in the albums 12-page booklet. The album was available exclusively through Hip-O-Records.com and Amazon.com. Only 4,000 copies were printed, and it is now out of print.

== Track listing ==
Credits adapted from the album's liner notes.

Side one
No.	Title	Writer(s)	Length
1.	"Cuddlebug (The Happiness Blanket)"	Josef Berger, Alan Arkin	1:56
2.	"If You Go Down to the Water"	Carly Simon, Nick Delbanco	2:52
3.	"Dinks Blues"	Traditional; adapted and arranged by Lucy Simon and Stuart Scharf	3:46
4.	"Turn, Turn, Turn"	Ecclesiastes, Pete Seeger	2:24
5.	"Hold Back the Branches"	Carly Simon, Lope de Vega	2:43
6.	"Ecoute Dans La Vent (Blowin' in the Wind)"	Bob Dylan	2:31

Side two
No.	Title	Writer(s)	Length
1.	"Motherless Child"	Ronnie Gilbert, Frank Hamilton	1:51
2.	"No One to Talk My Troubles To"	Dick Weissman	2:44
3.	"My Fisherman, My Laddie Oh"	Earl Robinson, Waldo Salt	3:38
4.	"Feuilles Oh (Leaves)"	Lee Hays, Harold Bernz, Ruth Bernz	2:10
5.	"If I Had A Ribbon Bow"	Louis C. Singer, Hughie Prince	2:30
6.	"Pale Horse and Rider"	Carly Simon	2:24
