= Touched by the Sun: My Friendship with Jackie =

2019 memoir by Carly Simon

- Author: Carly Simon
- Genre: Memoir
- Publisher: Farrar, Straus and Giroux
- Publication date: October 22, 2019
- Pages: 256
- ISBN: 978-0374277727

Touched by the Sun: My Friendship with Jackie is a memoir by American singer-songwriter Carly Simon.

== Publication ==
Touched by the Sun: My Friendship with Jackie was published on October 22, 2019 by Farrar, Straus and Giroux. The book is titled after Simon's song "Touched by the Sun", which was written for Onassis, and originally appeared on her 1994 album Letters Never Sent. As a tie-in to the books release, Simon released a newly mixed live version of "Touched by the Sun" from her 1995 concert special Live at Grand Central as a single.

== Content ==
The book recounts Simon's friendship with former First Lady Jacqueline Kennedy Onassis. The publisher described the book as "an intimate, vulnerable, and insightful portrait of the bond that grew between two iconic and starkly different American women." The pair met at summer party in Martha's Vineyard in the early 80's. Onassis later served as Simon's book editor on a number of her children's books in the late 80's and early 90's.

On her official website, Simon stated: "When I first met Jackie, I didn’t imagine we had that much in common much less expect her to become my book editor, confidant, protective mother figure, and mischievous pal. She arrived when I least expected to make a new friend and she stayed up until the time of her death. I’ve missed her deeply and am reminded of her every day. In the last few years, I found myself doing what I’ve done with all the other things in my life that were too big to look at directly and too important to understand fully as they were happening: I put it down on paper. I found that writing about our time together was the only way to begin to know what she meant to me. Publicly, Jackie was important to all of us, but privately, out of the public eye, I loved her. I wanted to share my experience of her."

== Reception ==
The book made the New York Times best seller list, and was selected by People as one of the top 10 books of 2019.
