= The Simon Sisters =

American folk music duo (1963-1969)

- Origin: Provincetown, Massachusetts, U.S.
- Genres: Folk; Children's
- Years active: 1963–1969
- Labels: Kapp; Columbia
- Past members: Carly Simon; Lucy Simon

The Simon Sisters were a folk music duo consisting of Carly Simon and Lucy Simon.

They released three albums between 1964-1969 before Lucy left to get married. Lucy had a minor solo career and released two albums in the 1970s before finding greater success writing music for Broadway plays; she received a Tony Award nomination for her music on The Secret Garden in 1991. Beginning in 1971, Carly began a very successful solo career, releasing over 23 studio albums that produced multiple top 40 hits across the U.S. Billboard charts, as well as winning two Grammy Awards (from 14 nominations), a Golden Globe Award, and an Academy Award, among numerous other competitive and honorary accolades.

== Background and history ==
The Simon Sisters made their television debut performing on the Hootenanny series on April 27, 1963. Their repertoire consisted of folk music, peppered with a few original compositions. They were signed to Kapp Records that same year, and released their debut album, Meet the Simon Sisters, in 1964. Their second album, Cuddlebug, was recorded during the same sessions as Meet the Simon Sisters, and was released in 1966. They had a minor hit with the single "Winkin', Blinkin' and Nod", a children's poem by Eugene Field that Lucy had put to music. It reached No. 73 on the Billboard Hot 100. The duo performed both "Winkin' Blinkin' And Nod" and "Turn! Turn! Turn!" on the Hootenanny series, and those performances were selected for inclusion in the Best of Hootenanny DVD set. In 1969, the duo was signed by Columbia Records and released a third album, The Simon Sisters Sing the Lobster Quadrille and Other Songs for Children, which was later re-released in 1973 as Lucy & Carly – The Simon Sisters Sing for Children.

In 2006, Hip-O-Select re-released the albums Meet the Simon Sisters and Cuddlebug on CD as the single-disc Winkin', Blinkin' and Nod: The Kapp Recordings. In 2008, Shout! Factory released the album The Simon Sisters Sing the Lobster Quadrille and Other Songs for Children on CD under the title Carly & Lucy Simon Sing Songs for Children.

== Discography ==
=== Studio albums ===
- 1964: Meet the Simon Sisters
- 1966: Cuddlebug
- 1969: The Simon Sisters Sing the Lobster Quadrille and Other Songs for Children

=== Compilations and reissues ===
- 1973: Lucy & Carly – The Simon Sisters Sing for Children [re-issue of the Lobster Quadrille album]
- 2006: Winkin', Blinkin' and Nod: The Kapp Recordings [re-issue of their first two albums]
- 2008: Carly & Lucy Simon Sing Songs for Children [re-issue of the Lobster Quadrille album]
