= Lucy Simon =

American composer (1940–2022)

- Born: Lucy Elizabeth Simon; May 5, 1940; New York City, U.S.
- Died: October 20, 2022 (aged 82); Piermont, New York, U.S.
- Occupations: Composer, Singer, Musician
- Years active: 1963–2022
- Spouse: David Levine (m. 1967)
- Children: 2
- Parents: Richard L. Simon (father); Andrea Heinemann Simon (mother)
- Relatives: Joanna Simon (sister); Carly Simon (sister); George T. Simon (uncle); Sally Taylor (niece)

Lucy Elizabeth Simon (May 5, 1940 – October 20, 2022) was an American singer and composer for the theatre and of popular songs. She recorded and performed as a singer and songwriter, and was known for the musicals The Secret Garden (1991) and Doctor Zhivago (2011).

In 1963, Simon began performing with her sister Carly Simon as the Simon Sisters. The duo released three albums, beginning with Meet the Simon Sisters, which featured the song "Winkin', Blinkin' and Nod"; based on the poem by Eugene Field, the song became a minor hit and reached No. 73 on the Billboard Hot 100. Simon won a Grammy Award in 1981 with her husband, David Levine, in the Best Recording for Children category for In Harmony, and again in 1983 in the same category for In Harmony 2. Simon received Tony Award and Drama Desk Award nominations for composing the music for the Broadway musical The Secret Garden.

== Early life and education ==
Simon was born in New York City on May 5, 1940. Her father, Richard L. Simon, was the co-founder of the book publisher Simon & Schuster, Inc.; her mother, Andrea (Heinemann) Simon, was a former switchboard operator, civil rights activist, and singer. She was the older sister of musician Carly Simon. Her father was from a German Jewish family, while her maternal grandfather Friedrich was of German descent. Lucy's maternal grandmother, known as "Chibie", was a Roman Catholic from Cuba, and was of pardo heritage, a freed-slave descendant (the show Finding Your Roots tested Carly Simon's DNA as "10 percent black"), and was sent to England and raised by nuns until the age of sixteen.

In addition to her younger sister Carly, she had an older sister, opera singer Joanna, and a younger brother, photographer Peter. Simon grew up in Fieldston, a section of Riverdale in the Bronx. She attended the Fieldston School, before studying at Bennington College, graduating in 1962.

== Career ==
Simon began her professional career singing folk tunes with sister Carly Simon as the Simon Sisters and later folk-rock. Simon's setting of "Wynken, Blynken, and Nod" has been recorded by many artists, including the Doobie Brothers, Mitzie Collins, and the Big Three (Cass Elliot, Tim Rose, and James Hendricks). In the mid-1970s, after a number of years away from recording, Lucy released two albums on the RCA Victor label of mostly original compositions, along with a few collaborations and covers. Her self-titled debut album was more folk-rock in orientation while her second album, Stolen Time, had a contemporary pop sound. Carly Simon and James Taylor provided backing vocals on half of the songs from Stolen Time. Simon won a Grammy Award in 1981 with her husband, David Levine, in the Best Recording for Children category for In Harmony: A Sesame Street Record, and again in 1983 in the same category for In Harmony 2.

Simon made her Broadway debut as the composer of The Secret Garden, for which she was nominated for a 1991 Tony Award for Best Original Score and a 1991 Drama Desk Award for Outstanding Music. She also wrote songs for the Off-Broadway show A... My Name Is Alice.

She composed the music for a musical version of the Russian novel Doctor Zhivago, with lyricists Michael Korie and Amy Powers and book writer Michael Weller. The musical had its world premiere at the La Jolla Playhouse, San Diego, California, in May 2006. A new version of Doctor Zhivago ran in Sydney, Australia, Melbourne, and Brisbane in 2011 under the title Doctor Zhivago – A New Musical, starring Anthony Warlow in the title role and Lucy Maunder as Lara, the sensitive doctor's secret muse. The musical was produced by John Frost with Des McAnuff directing. Anthony Warlow starred in the Australian production of The Secret Garden and at that time Simon said of him, "There is my Zhivago". The musical premiered on Broadway on March 27, 2015 (previews), with an official opening on April 21, 2015, at the Broadway Theatre, but was not successful, closing after 26 previews and 23 regular performances. She also contributed to the Off-Broadway musical Mama and Her Boys.

== Personal life ==
Lucy Simon married David Y. Levine in 1967. They remained married for 55 years until her death. Together, they had two children: Julie and James. She died on October 20, 2022, aged 82, at her home in Piermont, New York. She had suffered from metastatic breast cancer prior to her death, which came just one day after her sister Joanna died of thyroid cancer.

== Awards and nominations ==
=== Drama Desk Awards ===
The Drama Desk Awards is an annual prize recognizing excellence in New York theatre. The awards are considered a significant American theater distinction.

Drama Desk Awards
Year	Work	Award	Result	Ref
1991	The Secret Garden	Outstanding Music	Nominated	

=== Grammy Awards ===
The Grammy Awards are awarded annually by The Recording Academy of the United States for outstanding achievements in the music industry. Often considered the highest music honour, the awards were established in 1958.

Grammy Awards
Year	Work	Award	Result	Ref
1981	In Harmony: A Sesame Street Record	Best Album for Children	Won	
1983	In Harmony 2	Best Album for Children	Won	
1993	The Secret Garden – The Original Broadway Cast Album	Best Musical Show Album	Nominated	

=== Tony Awards ===
The Tony Awards recognize the excellence in live Broadway theatre. The awards are presented by the American Theatre Wing and The Broadway League.

Tony Awards
Year	Work	Award	Result	Ref
1991	The Secret Garden	Best Original Score	Nominated	

== Discography ==
=== Studio albums ===
The Simon Sisters

- 1964: Meet the Simon Sisters
- 1966: Cuddlebug
- 1969: The Simon Sisters Sing the Lobster Quadrille and Other Songs for Children
- 1973: Lucy & Carly – The Simon Sisters Sing for Children [re-issue of the "Lobster Quadrille" album]
- 2006: Winkin', Blinkin' and Nod: The Kapp Recordings [re-issue of their first two albums]
- 2008: Carly & Lucy Simon Sing Songs for Children [re-issue of the "Lobster Quadrille" album]

Solo

- 1975: Lucy Simon
- 1977: Stolen Time

=== Singles ===
The Simon Sisters

- 1964: "Winkin', Blinkin' and Nod"

Solo

- 1975: "Sally Go 'Round the Sun"
- 1977: "If You Ever Believed"

=== Other appearances ===
- 1980: "I Have a Song" by Lucy Simon – In Harmony: A Sesame Street Record
- 1981: "Maryanne" by Lucy & Carly Simon – In Harmony 2
- 1981: The Rodgers and Hart Album (Simon appears on two cuts of this William Bolcom and Joan Morris album)
