= Robin Danar =

- Occupation(s): Producer, engineer, musician
- Years active: 1982-present
- Website: robindanar.com

Robin Danar is an American producer, recording and mixing engineer, and musician.

== Career ==
Danar started engineering records in New York City under mentors Steve Lillywhite, Phil Ramone, and Gary Katz. At the same time, he was doing live sound and recording at the famed club CBGB in its prime when it was known for hosting punk rock and new wave bands, including the New York Dolls.

Danar then went on to tour internationally as a front of house sound engineer for artists including Laurie Anderson, Suzanne Vega, The B-52's, and Cyndi Lauper. He was also involved in recording Bonnie Raitt and Los Lobos for the Wim Wenders film The Soul of a Man, part of the PBS series Martin Scorsese Presents The Blues.

Danar is involved with Santa Monica's public radio station KCRW as a producer of the annual "A Sounds Eclectic Evening" and "Sessions" projects. He was also involved as a producer of the Shortlist Music Prize which was broadcast on MTV and XM Radio.

He is currently the Production Manager at Teragram Ballroom in Los Angeles.

== Altered States ==
In 2008, Danar released his first producer-as-artist album Altered States, featuring performers from the Los Angeles music scene including Lisa Loeb, Rachael Yamagata, Jesca Hoop, and others. The album received positive reviews from critics at PopMatters and Hits Daily Double. Gianfranco Marmoni, writing in OndaRock, gave the album 6.5 out of 10 stars, praising its "great instrumental mastery" and the quality of its song covers, while finding that the varieties of music styles made listening "somewhat discontinuous". Altered States was recorded entirely inside Danar's garage.
