= Wynken, Blynken, and Nod =

Poem by Eugene Field

- by Eugene Field
- Illustration by Maxfield Parrish, 1904
- Original title: Dutch Lullaby
- Language: English

"Wynken, Blynken, and Nod" is a poem for children written by American writer and poet Eugene Field and published on March 9, 1889. The original title was "Dutch Lullaby". The poem is a fantasy bed-time story about three children sailing and fishing among the stars from a boat which is a wooden shoe. The names suggest a sleepy child's blinking eyes and nodding head. The spelling of the names, and the "wooden shoe," suggest Dutch language and names, as hinted in the original title.

== Text ==
Wynken, Blynken, and Nod one night
Sailed off in a wooden shoe—
Sailed on a river of crystal light,
Into a sea of dew.
'Where are you going, and what do you wish?'
The old moon asked the three.
'We have come to fish for the herring-fish
That live in this beautiful sea;
Nets of silver and gold have we!'
Said Wynken,
Blynken,
And Nod.

The old moon laughed and sang a song,
As they rocked in the wooden shoe,
And the wind that sped them all night long
Ruffled the waves of dew.
The little stars were the herring fish
That lived in the beautiful sea–
'Now cast your nets wherever you wish—
Never afeard are we';
So cried the stars to the fishermen three:
Wynken,
Blynken,
And Nod.

All night long their nets they threw
To the stars in the twinkling foam—
Then down from the skies came the wooden shoe,
Bringing the fishermen home;
'Twas all so pretty a sail it seemed
As if it could not be,
And some folk thought ’twas a dream they’d dreamed
Of sailing that beautiful sea–
But I shall name you the fishermen three:
Wynken,
Blynken,
And Nod.

Wynken and Blynken are two little eyes,
And Nod is a little head,
And the wooden shoe that sailed the skies
Is the wee one’s trundle-bed.
So shut your eyes while mother sings
Of wonderful sights that be,
And you shall see the beautiful things
As you rock in the misty sea,
Where the old shoe rocked the fishermen three:
Wynken,
Blynken,
And Nod.

== Musical adaptations ==
By 1890, the lyrics had been set to music, by American pianist and composer Ethelbert Woodbridge Nevin. Dan Hornsby recorded this song for Victor BS-037380 RCA (BlueBird) Records released in 1929. David Gude performed the song on his 1961 Vanguard album New Folks.

In 1963, songwriter Lucy Simon wrote a setting (she claimed it was "the first song I ever wrote") that she recorded with her sister Carly as the Simon Sisters. Appearing on their debut album Meet the Simon Sisters (1964), the song became a minor hit for the duo, reaching No. 73 on the Billboard Pop singles chart and No. 20 in Canada. The song has been recorded by many artists, including: The Big 3 featuring Cass Elliot (1963); The Irish Rovers on their album The Life of the Rover (1969); Roger Whittaker on his children's album The Magical World of Roger Whittaker (1975); Joanie Bartels, on her album "Lullaby Magic" (1985); Canadian children's entertainer Fred Penner on his album The Cat Came Back (1979); and the Doobie Brothers for the children's music compilation In Harmony (1980). Their version also became a minor hit, reaching No. 76 on the Billboard Pop singles chart and No. 31 on the Billboard Adult Contemporary chart.

Donovan wrote and sang a musical setting on his children's album H.M.S. Donovan (1971).

Buffy Saint-Marie wrote and sang a version on Sesame Street in 1975, and on her album Sweet America (1976).

Children's entertainer Joanie Bartels sang a rendition on her premiere album, "Lullaby Magic." (1985)

Producer David Bernard Wolf set the poem for the Barney & Friends 1995 album Barney's Sleepytime Songs.

Kevin Roth created a version for his album Now I Lay Me Down to Sleep (1996).

Tatiana Cameron sings her version on her lullaby album A Chance to Dream (2006).

David Tamulevich (of the folk duo Mustard's Retreat) wrote new original music to the poem, which was subsequently released in 2011 on the Mustard's Retreat CD Living in the Dream. (2011)

Composer Christopher Klaich composed a contemporary lullaby concert setting for soprano Bianca Showalter which has piano or alternatively chamber orchestral accompaniment (circa 2013).

Composer Stephen DeCesare composed an SATB version of the poem, (2013).

Valentine Wolfe released a heavy metal version in their album A Child's Bestiary, (2016).

== References in other artistic works ==
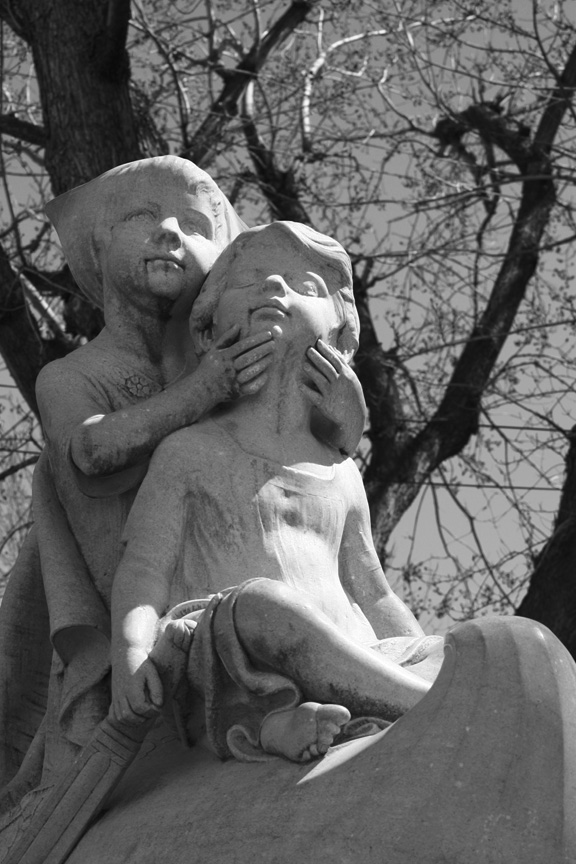
Wynken, Blynken, and Nod by Mabel Landrum Torrey, 1918, formerly a fountain in Washington Park, Denver

- American sculptor Mabel Landrum Torrey created "Wynken, Blynken and Nod Fountain", dedicated in 1919 in Denver's Washington Park.
- In 1938, Walt Disney Productions released an eight-minute cartoon, Wynken, Blynken and Nod, which stylized the fishermen of the poem as three pajama-clad children playing and fishing (for star fish) among the stars.
- "Wynkin, Blynkin and Nod" are mentioned in the epilogue of the 1945 recording of the Nutcracker Suite by Spike Jones and his City Slickers.
- Wynkin, Blynkin and Nod are three minor characters in the 1953 novel The Demolished Man. They are three telepathic assistants working for Lincoln Powell, the chief investigator throughout the novel.
- In 1960, American artist Arthur Kraft created a penguin sculpture named "Wynkin, Blynkin and Nod" for the Glendale Shopping Center in Indianapolis It is currently on display at the Indianapolis Zoo
- In the 1963 episode, “Opie the Birdman”, of The Andy Griffith Show series, Opie names his three pet birds: Wynken, Blynken, and Nod.
- In the 1973 episode, "Rated X", of Sanford and Son series, a cop refers to Fred, Lamont, and Rollo as "Wynken, Blynken, and Nod."
- Lou Reed references the trio in an early version of the song "Satellite of Love", performed by The Velvet Underground. The lyric is not present on the official release of the song on his later album Transformer.
- In the 1993 film Dennis the Menace, Mrs. Wilson recites "Wynken, Blynken, and Nod" to Dennis when she puts him to bed after babysitting him for the day. While she recites the poem, Dennis's parents, Henry and Alice, both of whom are away on business, think about their family from their respective hotel rooms, and the camera focuses on each one of them at the end of the poem, symbolizing Alice as Wynken, Henry as Blynken, and Dennis as Nod.
- In 2007, an animated film based on the poem was released by Weston Woods Studios.
- In the 2016-2019 series Preacher, DeBlanc sings "Wynken, Blynken, and Nod" to Genesis in an attempt to coax it out of Jesse Custer and back into an empty can of ‘Old Timer’ brand coffee.
