= Delia Green =

American child murder victim (1886–1900)

- Born: 1886
- Died: December 25, 1900 (aged 13-14); Savannah, Georgia, U.S.
- Cause of death: Homicide by firearm
- Resting place: Laurel Grove Cemetery South, Savannah, Georgia, US
- Known for: Murder victim, song inspiration

Delia Green (1886 – December 25, 1900) was a 14-year-old African-American murder victim who has been identified as the likely inspiration for several well-known traditional American songs, usually known by the titles "Delia", "Delia's Gone" or "Little Delia".

== History ==
According to contemporaneous reports published in Georgia newspapers, Green was shot by 15-year-old Mose (or Moses) Houston late on Christmas Eve 1900 in the Yamacraw neighborhood of Savannah, Georgia, and died at 3:00 a.m. on Christmas Day. Houston, the newspapers implied, had been involved in a sexual relationship with Green for several months. The shooting took place at the home of Willie West, who chased down Houston after the shooting and turned him over to the city police.

Green's murder and Houston's trial in the spring of 1901 were reported in the Savannah Morning News and the Savannah Evening Press. Although Houston reportedly had confessed to the murder at the time of his arrest, at his trial, he claimed the shooting was accidental. Other witnesses, however, testified that Houston had become angry after Green called him "a son of a bitch".

Houston was convicted and sentenced to life in prison after jury recommended mercy. In a clemency petition after the trial, Houston's attorney, Raiford Falligant, cast Houston as "a mere child" who "got into bad company and so unfortunately committed the act that he now suffers for". After serving more than twelve years, he was paroled by Governor John M. Slaton in October 1913. Accounts of his later life are sketchy, but he is said to have died in New York City in 1927 after other brushes with the law.

Green was initially buried in an unmarked grave in Laurel Grove Cemetery South in Savannah. In 2020 the Killer Blues Headstone Project placed a headstone for her at that location.

== Songs ==
Songs based on Delia Green's murder became both common and popular in the next few decades. In 1928, folklorist Robert Winslow Gordon reported to the Library of Congress that he had traced the songs back to a murder in Savannah and that he had interviewed both Green's mother and the police officer who took Houston into custody.

Gordon's research was never published, and Green's relationship to the popular songs was essentially unknown until University of Georgia musicologist John F. Garst, working from hints left by Gordon, turned up the details in Savannah newspaper archives.

The songs inspired by Green's murder now appear in two forms; both forms were staples of the folk revival of the 1950s and early 1960s. One version, usually attributed to Blake Alphonso Higgs, is known as "Delia's Gone". It is explicitly told from her killer's point of view. The second version, usually attributed to Blind Willie McTell, is usually known as "Delia" and is told from the point of view of a loved one of Delia's.

Among the many singers who have sung "Delia" are Bob Dylan and David Bromberg. Josh White and Pete Seeger each recorded "Delia's Gone" in 1955, followed by Harry Belafonte, Bud and Travis, Burl Ives, The Kingston Trio, and other "folk revival" singers. Pat Boone had a minor hit with "Delia Gone" in 1960, with the composition attributed to Caperton Henley.

It was recorded numerous times by country singers, including Bobby Bare, Waylon Jennings, and Johnny Cash. In the music video for Cash's fourth recording of the song, the role of Delia was played by Kate Moss.

The song "Delia's Gone" was such a staple of the folk revival of the 1960s that Steve Goodman used the melody and chorus for his song about Chicago Mayor Richard J. Daley "Daley's Gone", released on his 1977 album Say It in Private.

== Bibliography ==
- Kodish, Debora, Good Friends and Bad Enemies: Robert Winslow Gordon and the Study of American Folksong
- Southern Folklore Quarterly, vol. 1, December 1937
