= Carly Simon: Original Album Series =

Box set by Carly Simon
- Released: October 10, 2011
- Recorded: 1970–1975
- Genres: Rock, pop
- Length: 3:04:46
- Label: Rhino
- Producers: Eddie Kramer; Paul Samwell-Smith; Richard Perry

Carly Simon chronology
Never Been Gone (2009)	Carly Simon: Original Album Series (2011)	Playlist: The Very Best of Carly Simon (2014)

Carly Simon: Original Album Series is a five CD set by American singer-songwriter Carly Simon, released on October 10, 2011.

The set is a part of Rhino's Original Album Series, and collects Simon's first five albums: Carly Simon (1971), Anticipation (1971), No Secrets (1972), Hotcakes (1974), and Playing Possum (1975). The discs are packaged in mini LP cardboard replicas with the original artwork, and housed inside a slipcased box. The discs themselves are reissues of the original Elektra releases, none have been remastered, and no bonus tracks are included.

== Reception ==
Professional ratings
Review scores
Source	Rating
AllMusic	4/5 stars

Stephen Thomas Erlewine of AllMusic commended the set as "an easy, affordable, and handsome way to get Carly Simon's prime", and awarded it 4 out of 5 stars.

== Track listings ==
Disc one: Carly Simon (1971)
No.	Title	Writer(s)	Length
1.	"That's the Way I've Always Heard It Should Be"	Carly Simon; Jacob Brackman	4:15
2.	"Alone"	Simon	3:36
3.	"One More Time"	Simon	3:32
4.	"The Best Thing"	Simon	4:14
5.	"Just A Sinner"	Moogy Klingman	3:10
6.	"Dan, My Fling"	Brackman; Freddy Gardner	5:28
7.	"Another Door"	Simon	3:16
8.	"Reunions"	Simon; Bill Mernit; Eddie Kramer	3:06
9.	"Rolling Down The Hills"	Simon	3:35
10.	"The Love's Still Growing"	Buzzy Linhart	4:14
Total length:			38:26

Disc two: Anticipation (1971)
No.	Title	Writer(s)	Length
1.	"Anticipation"	Simon	3:19
2.	"Legend in Your Own Time"	Simon	3:45
3.	"Our First Day Together"	Simon	3:29
4.	"The Girl You Think You See"	Simon; Brackman	3:07
5.	"Summer's Coming Around Again"	Simon; Jim Ryan; Paul Glanz	4:10
6.	"Share the End"	Simon; Brackman	3:58
7.	"The Garden"	Simon; Brackman	4:08
8.	"Three Days"	Simon	3:19
9.	"Julie Through the Glass"	Simon	3:23
10.	"I've Got to Have You"	Kris Kristofferson	4:45
Total length:			37:23

Disc three: No Secrets (1972)
No.	Title	Writer(s)	Length
1.	"The Right Thing to Do"	Simon	2:57
2.	"The Carter Family"	Simon; Brackman	3:29
3.	"You're So Vain"	Simon	4:17
4.	"His Friends Are More Than Fond of Robin"	Simon	3:00
5.	"We Have No Secrets"	Simon	3:57
6.	"Embrace Me, You Child"	Simon	4:06
7.	"Waited So Long"	Simon	4:14
8.	"It Was So Easy"	Simon; Brackman	3:06
9.	"Night Owl"	James Taylor	3:47
10.	"When You Close Your Eyes"	Simon; Bill Mernit	3:05
Total length:			35:58

Disc four: Hotcakes (1974)
No.	Title	Writer(s)	Length
1.	"Safe and Sound"	Simon	3:36
2.	"Mind on My Man"	Simon	2:57
3.	"Think I'm Gonna Have a Baby"	Simon	3:55
4.	"Older Sister"	Simon	3:06
5.	"Just Not True"	Simon	5:16
6.	"Hotcakes"	Simon	1:07
7.	"Misfit"	Simon	3:04
8.	"Forever My Love"	Simon; Taylor	3:25
9.	"Mockingbird"	Inez Foxx; Charlie Foxx; Taylor^{[a]}	4:11
10.	"Grownup"	Simon	3:44
11.	"Haven't Got Time for the Pain"	Simon; Brackman	3:50
Total length:			38:11

Disc five: Playing Possum (1975)
No.	Title	Writer(s)	Length
1.	"After the Storm"	Simon	2:47
2.	"Love Out in the Street"	Simon	3:40
3.	"Look Me in the Eyes"	Simon	3:34
4.	"More and More"	Mac Rebennack; Alvin Robinson	4:02
5.	"Slave"	Simon; Brackman	3:54
6.	"Attitude Dancing"	Simon; Brackman	3:52
7.	"Sons of Summer"	Billy Mernit	3:05
8.	"Waterfall"	Simon	3:31
9.	"Are You Ticklish"	Simon	2:26
10.	"Playing Possum"	Simon	3:57
Total length:			34:48

Notes

- ^a signifies a writer by additional lyrics
