= Nitty Gritty (disambiguation) =

Nitty Gritty (1957–1991) was a Jamaican reggae singer.

Nitty Gritty may also refer to:

- Nitty Gritty (album), a 1969 album by Gladys Knight & the Pips
- "The Nitty Gritty" (song), a 1963 song recorded by Shirley Ellis
- "Nitty Gritty", a song by KMD from their album Mr. Hood

== See also ==
- Nitti Gritti (born 1994), American music producer
- Nitty Gritty Dirt Band, an American country music band
- Nitty (disambiguation)
