= The Belle Stars (album) =

Studio album by The Belle Stars
- Released: January 1983
- Studio: Trident Studios and Mayfair Studios, London
- Genre: Pop, new wave
- Length: 38:53
- Label: Stiff
- Producer: Peter Collins, Brian Tench, Pete Wingfield

The Belle Stars chronology
The Belle Stars (1983)	The Very Best of The Belle Stars (1993)

Singles from The Belle Stars
- 1. "Iko Iko" / "The Reason" Released: May 1982; 2. "The Clapping Song" / "Blame" Released: July 1982; 3. "Mockingbird" / "Turn Back the Clock" Released: October 1982; 4. "Sign of the Times" / "Madness" Released: 30 December 1982; 5. "Indian Summer" / "Sun Sun Sun" Released: August 1983

Professional ratings
Review scores
Source	Rating
AllMusic	4/5 stars

The Belle Stars is the only studio album by the all-female band of the same name released in 1983 (see 1983 in music). The band's eponymous debut album reached number 15 on the UK Albums Chart. The Belle Stars had some success with their single "Iko Iko", a cover of The Dixie Cups' 1965 hit. It charted at number 35 in June 1982 on the UK Singles Chart. Seven years later the song became a hit on the Billboard Hot 100 chart after it was featured in the movie Rain Man, where it peaked at number 14.

== Track listing ==
All tracks are written by The Belle Stars unless noted.

Side one
No.	Title	Writer(s)	Length
1.	"Sign of the Times"		2:52
2.	"Ci Ya Ya"		2:40
3.	"The Clapping Song (Clap Pat Clap Slap)" (Shirley Ellis cover)	Lincoln Chase	3:11
4.	"Indian Summer"		3:43
5.	"Harlem Shuffle" (Bob & Earl cover)	Earl Nelson, Bob Relf	3:17
6.	"The Reason"		3:57

Side two
No.	Title	Writer(s)	Length
7.	"Iko Iko" (Sugar Boy and his Cane Cutters cover)	Rosa Lee Hawkins, Joan Marie Johnson, Sharon Jones, Jesse Thomas	3:00
8.	"Baby I'm Yours"		3:36
9.	"Mockingbird" (Inez and Charlie Foxx cover)	Inez Foxx, Charlie Foxx	3:22
10.	"The Snake" (Al Wilson cover)	Oscar Brown, Jr.	3:16
11.	"Burning"		3:21
12.	"Needle in a Haystack" (The Velvelettes cover)	William "Mickey" Stevenson, Norman Whitfield	2:38

== Personnel ==
The Belle Stars

- Jennie McKeown – lead vocals
- Sarah-Jane Owen – lead guitar, wah–wah guitar, vocals
- Stella Barker – rhythm guitar, acoustic guitar, vocals
- Clare Hirst – tenor saxophone, keyboards, vocals
- Miranda Joyce – alto saxophone, vocals
- Lesley Shone – bass, vocals
- Judy Parsons – drums, percussion, vocals

Additional musicians

- Martin Ditcham, Graham Broad – percussion

Technical

- Peter Collins – producer on tracks 1, 2, 3, 5, 9, 11
- Phil Chapman, Pete Hammond, Julian Mendelsohn, Phil Harding – engineers on tracks 1, 2, 3, 5, 9, 11
- Brian Tench – producer and engineer on tracks 4, 6, 7, 8, 10, 12
- Pete Wingfield – producer on track 6
- Alvin Clark – engineer on track 6
