= Nitty Gritty (album) =

Studio album by Gladys Knight & the Pips
- Released: September 25, 1969
- Recorded: 1969 at Hitsville U.S.A. in Detroit
- Length: 42:13
- Label: Soul

Gladys Knight & the Pips chronology
All In A Knight's Work (1968)	Nitty Gritty (1969)	Greatest Hits (1970)

Singles from Nitty Gritty
- 1. "Didn't You Know (You'd Have to Cry Sometime)" Released: 1969; 2. "The Nitty Gritty" Released: June 26, 1969; 3. "Friendship Train" Released: October 6, 1969

Nitty Gritty is the sixth studio album by Gladys Knight & the Pips, released in 1969 on Motown's Soul Records imprint.

== History ==
The album had three singles that became a hit. "Didn't You Know (You'd Have to Cry Sometime)" peaked at No. 63 on the pop chart, and No. 11 on the R&B chart. "The Nitty Gritty", originally recorded by Shirley Ellis, peaked at No. 19 on the pop charts, and on No. 2 on the R&B charts. "Friendship Train" peaked at No. 17 on the pop charts, and No. 2 on the R&B charts. It was later nominated for a Grammy Award.

== Reception ==
Professional ratings
Review scores
Source	Rating
AllMusic	3/5 stars
The Encyclopedia of Popular Music	3/5 stars

John Lowe of AllMusic stated: "One of the reasons was their association with writer/producer Norman Whitfield, whose grittier, funkier style proved to be a key to Motown's counterattack to the rawer soul sounds that emerged in the latter part of the decade."

== Track listing ==
No.	Title	Writer(s)	Length
1.	"Cloud Nine"	Barrett Strong, Norman Whitfield	3:05
2.	"Runnin' Out"	Ashford & Simpson	2:15
3.	"Didn't You Know (You'd Have To Cry Sometime)"	Ashford & Simpson	3:20
4.	"(I Know) I'm Losing You"	Cornelius Grant, Eddie Holland, Norman Whitfield	2:33
5.	"The Nitty Gritty"	Lincoln Chase	2:57
6.	"Ain't No Sun Since You've Been Gone"	Cornelius Grant, Norman Whitfield, Sylvia Moy	3:20

No.	Title	Writer(s)	Length
1.	"All I Could Do Was Cry"	Berry Gordy Jr., B. Davis, George Gordy	2:57
2.	"Keep An Eye"	Ashford & Simpson	2:48
3.	"Got Myself A Good Man"	Barrett Strong, Norman Whitfield	2:58
4.	"It's Summer"	B. Strong*, N. Whitfield*	2:18
5.	"The Stranger"	Ivy Jo Hunter	3:07
6.	"I Want Him To Say It Again"	Merald Knight*, G. Knight*, J. Bristol*, Wm. Guest*	2:58

== Charts ==
Chart (1969)	Peak position
US Billboard 200 (Billboard)	81
US Hot Soul LPs (Billboard)	11

=== Singles ===
Song title	US Pop Charts	US R&B Charts	Canada CHUM/RPM
"Didn't You Know (You'd Have to Cry Sometime)	63	11	–
"Friendship Train"	19	2	27
"The Nitty Gritty"	17	2	29
