= Sweet Memory =

Single by The Belle Stars
- B-side: "April Fool", "Sign Of The Times"(Germany)
- Released: 1983
- Recorded: 1982
- Genre: Pop, dance-rock
- Length: 3:23, 6:39 (Extended Remix)
- Label: Stiff
- Songwriters: Lesley Shone, Jennie Matthias, Miranda Joyce, Sarah-Jane Owen, Judy Parsons, Stella Barker, Clare Hirst
- Producer: Pete Collins

The Belle Stars singles chronology
"Sign of the Times" (1983)	"Sweet Memory" (1983)	"Indian Summer" (1983)

"Sweet Memory" is a 1983 song by English pop/new wave band The Belle Stars, released as their eighth single overall. Unlike its predecessor, Sign of the Times, it did not make it into the top 10 in the UK. However, it did manage to get into the top 30, peaking at #22.

The music video for the song features the band performing live. It was produced by Pete Collins.

== Track listings ==
Germany Vinyl 7" Single (6 13880)

1. "Sweet Memory"
2. "Sign of the Times"

UK Vinyl 7" Single (BUY 174)

1. "Sweet Memory"
2. "April Fool"

Spain Vinyl 12" Maxi-Single (VIC-97)

1. "Sweet Memory" (Extended Remix)
2. "April Fool"
3. "The Entertainer" (Extended Version)
4. "Indian Summer" (Extended Remix)

UK Vinyl 12" Single (BUY-IT 174)

1. "Sweet Memory" (Extended Remix)
2. "April Fool"
