= The Mad Tea Party =

The Mad Tea Party (originally Ami Worthen's Mad Tea Party) is an eclectic uke-abilly band based in Asheville, NC. The high energy group was formed by Ami Worthen (vocals, ukulele, and other occasional instruments) and Jason Krekel (guitar, ukulele, slide whistle, kazoo and other assorted items), who performed and recorded as a duo for several years. The duo quickly caught the attention of the indie scene in their hometown. National Public Radio stations across the country began picking up their 2004 album 73% Post-Consumer Novelty. Lora Pendelton joined the band on bass later that year. The trio released Flying Saucers in 2005, also to great response on NPR stations.

Mad Tea Party regularly tours on the southeastern circuit and occasionally opens for Southern Culture on the Skids.

Mad Tea Party's album Big Top Soda Pop came out in October 2006. It was enthusiastically received at college and NPR stations nationwide, and charted on the CMJ's Top 200. Pendleton left the band at the time of the album's release, and Joe Edel stepped in for a year. The band returned to a duo format in 2008 and soon after signed with Nine Mile Records. Their song "Baby, It's Time to Vote" (from their 2004 album 73% Post-Consumer Novelty) is particularly popular during election years, as well as with high school SGA elections.

== Discography ==
=== Albums ===
- Be In Life (by Ami Worthen's Mad Tea Party) - CDr (Whose That Records, 2002)
- 73% Post-Consumer Novelty (Whose That Records, 2004)
- Flying Saucers (Whose That Records, 2005)
- Big Top, Soda Pop (Whose That Records, 2006)
- Found a Reason (Nine Mile Records, 2008)
- Retro-spective - digital 10-year-anniversary compilation (via Bandcamp, 2014)

=== E.P.s / Singles ===
- Make Some Music (by Ami Worthen's Mad Tea Party) - CDr (Little King Records, 2001)
- "Found a Reason" - 7" (Whose That Records, 2007)
- Zombie Boogie - 7" EP (Whose That Records, 2009)
- "Oh Sh*t it's Christmastime"/"It's Cold Outside" - digital single (2009)
- Rock-n-Roll Ghoul - 7" EP (Whose That Records, 2010)
- "Hey Teabaggers, Leave Our Party Alone!" - digital single (2010)
- Warm Up Bones - digital EP with physical lyrics/art zine (via Bandcamp, 2018)
- Tucked Away - digital EP for charity (via Bandcamp, 2020)
