= Swamp Fox =

Swamp Fox may refer to:

== People ==
- Francis Marion, American Revolution leader
- Marion Campbell, American football player and coach
- Alvin Dark, baseball player and manager
- J. J. Dickison, colonel in the Confederate States Army during the American Civil War
- Mike Patterson (footballer), Australian rules footballer and coach
- M. Jeff Thompson, general in the Confederate States Army during the American Civil War
- Tony Joe White, American musician and songwriter

== Other uses ==
- The Swamp Fox (TV series), a 1959-1961 Disney-produced television series about Francis Marion
- Swamp Fox (roller coaster), located in Myrtle Beach, South Carolina, U.S.
- 157th Fighter Squadron, a unit of the South Carolina Air National Guard 169th Fighter Wing
- Thames Valley Rugby Football Union, North Island, New Zealand
- The mascot of Waycross College, Georgia, U.S.
- "Swamp Fox", a song by Southern Culture on the Skids from the 2004 album Mojo Box
