= The banana song =

The banana song may refer to:

- The Name Game, an American popular music song as a rhyming game that creates variations on a person's name.
- Day-O (The Banana Boat Song), a traditional Jamaican folk song from the point of view of dock workers working the night shift loading bananas onto ships.
