= Robert Banas =

American dancer and actor (1933–2024)

- Born: September 22, 1933; New York City, New York, U.S.
- Died: July 29, 2024 (aged 90); Los Angeles, California, U.S.
- Occupation: Dancer
- Spouse: Susan G. Mintz (m. 1964; div. 1969)
- Children: 1

Robert Joseph Banas (September 22, 1933 – July 29, 2024) was an American dancer and actor who worked in films such as West Side Story (1961), Down and Out in Beverly Hills (1986) and Always (1989). He was also a choreographer and dance coach.

== Early life ==
Banas said he began to dance at age five. "I just couldn’t sit still when I’d hear those big bands: Tommy Dorsey, Ray Anthony, Count Basie, Les Brown and Stan Kenton."

During World War II, his father became a military chief inspector for the steel mills in McKeesport, Pennsylvania, while his mother became a propeller inspector for Curtiss-Wright in Erie.

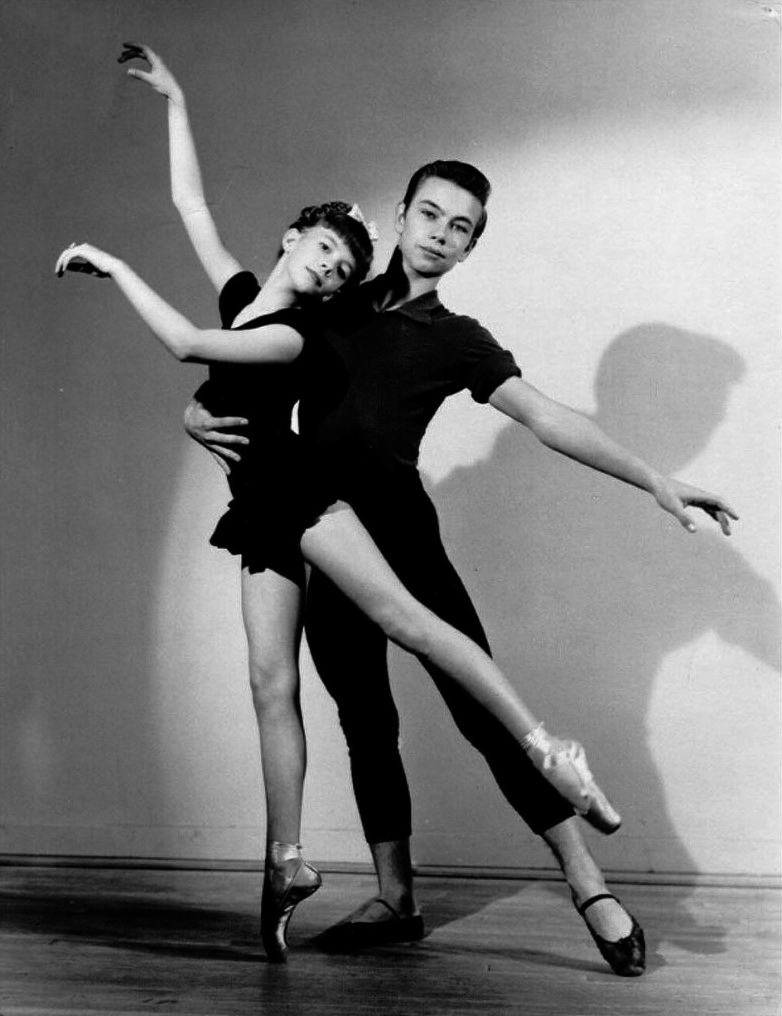
Banas with Natalie Wood, late 1940's

In 1942, his father arranged ballroom dance lessons for Banas and his sister Faith. Natalie Wood was his dancing partner in the Michael Panaieff Children’s’ Ballet Company, to which he received a scholarship and in which Jill St. John and Stefanie Powers were members. Banas also attended the Hollywood Professional School.

== Career ==
Banas auditioned for the production of Carousel at the LA Civic Light Opera and was cast as Enoch Snow Jr. After that, he appeared in stage productions of Kiss Me Kate, Annie Get Your Gun, Brigadoon, Plain and Fancy, and Peter Pan. He made appearances in various films, including Bye Bye Birdie, West Side Story, The Unsinkable Molly Brown and in Mary Poppins as a chimney sweep. As part of a group of male dancers, he was kissed by Marilyn Monroe at the end of her song "My Heart Belongs To Daddy" in the 1960 film Let's Make Love. He also made numerous television appearances, including an episode of Get Smart.

Banas later became a choreographer and dance teacher in the Los Angeles area. A dance he choreographed for the Shirley Ellis song "The Nitty Gritty" and performed (with five other dancers) on The Judy Garland Show in 1963 drew him renewed attention on YouTube in the 2010s, where copies of it had been viewed more than 19 million times by November 2024.

== Death ==
Banas died of pneumonia at an assisted living facility in Encino at the age of 90.
