= Sign of the Times (The Belle Stars song) =

Single by The Belle Stars

from the album The Belle Stars
- B-side: "Madness"
- Released: December 30, 1982
- Recorded: 1982
- Genre: New wave
- Length: 2:56; 5:50 (Extended Remix)
- Label: Stiff
- Songwriters: Lesley Shone, Jennie Matthias, Miranda Joyce, Sarah-Jane Owen, Judy Parsons, Stella Barker, Clare Hirst
- Producer: Peter Collins

The Belle Stars singles chronology
"Mockingbird" (1982)	"Sign of the Times" (1982)	"Sweet Memory" (1983)

"Sign of the Times" is a song by English pop/new wave band the Belle Stars, released as the fourth single from the band's self-titled only studio album. It was their seventh single overall and first single written by the band since 1981's "Another Latin Love Song". The single was the band's only top ten hit, reaching No. 3 on the UK Singles Chart in the week of 19 February 1983, and was subsequently listed by the Official Charts Company as the 31st best-selling single of 1983 in the UK. It also entered on the Billboard Hot 100, peaking at No. 75 in the week of 14 May 1983.

The music video features the band wearing tuxedos and performing the song in a dark building with flashing blue lights.

== Background ==
In 1982, the Belle Stars released three cover versions: "Iko Iko" by the Dixie Cups, "The Clapping Song" by Shirley Ellis, and "Mockingbird" by Inez & Charlie Foxx. Dave Robinson at Stiff Records, the band's record company, suggested that the band ought to perform covers to attract audiences, then after three covers write their own song, and it would be a hit. This happened to come true when the band released "Sign of the Times".

== Charts ==
=== Weekly charts ===
Chart (1983)	Peak position
Belgium (Ultratop 50 Flanders)	2
Netherlands (Dutch Top 40)	3
Netherlands (Single Top 100)	6
New Zealand (Recorded Music NZ)	21
Norway (VG-lista)	7
Sweden (Sverigetopplistan)	10
UK Singles (Official Charts)	3
US Billboard Hot 100	75
US Dance Club Songs (Billboard)	43

=== Year-end charts ===
Chart (1983)	Position
Belgium (Ultratop Flanders)	56
Netherlands (Dutch Top 40)	66
Netherlands (Single Top 100)	49
