= Joanie Bartels =

American singer-songwriter (born 1953)

- Born: Joan Constance Bartels; May 21, 1953 (age 73); Dorchester, Massachusetts, U.S.
- Genres: Children's, pop
- Occupations: Singer, songwriter, actress
- Years active: 1980–2007
- Labels: Sony BMG, Discovery, Purple Frog, Rounder

Joan Constance Bartels (born May 21, 1953) is a retired American children's singer-songwriter, recording artist, and occasional actress based in New Zealand. Her 1985 album, Lullaby Magic, was certified gold by the Recording Industry Association of America in 1992.

== Early life ==
Bartels was born in Dorchester, Massachusetts, a neighborhood of Boston on May 21, 1953. Her father was a native of Southport, North Carolina and her mother was a native of Sharon, Massachusetts. She is a graduate of Natick High School.

She had her own recording company called Purple Frog Records, and created Put on Your Dancing Shoes and Dreamland.

She was married in 2006 and officially moved to New Zealand.

== Discography ==
=== Albums ===
- Sillytime Magic (1980)
- Lullaby Magic (with bonus karaoke tracks) (1985)
- Morning Magic (with bonus karaoke tracks) (1986)
- Lullaby Magic, Vol. 2 (with bonus karaoke tracks on side 2 of tape only) (1987)
- Travelin' Magic (with bonus karaoke tracks) (1988)
- Bathtime Magic (1990)
- Christmas Magic (1990)
- Dancin' Magic (1991)
- The Stars of Discovery Music (with Bethie and Dennis Hysom) (1993)
- Jump for Joy: Joanie's Jukebox Cafe (1993)
- Adventures with Friends and Family (1996)
- Put Your Dancing Shoes On (2001)
- Angels of December (with Thom Rotella) (2002)
- Dreamland (2002)
- Jazzy (2005)

=== Singles ===
==== Sillytime Magic (1980) ====
- "Animal Crackers in My Soup"
- "Sillie Pie"
- "The Name Game"
- "The Alphabet Song"
- "Swinging on a Star"

==== Morning Magic (1986) ====
- "Put on a Happy Face"

==== Lullaby Magic, Vol. 2 (1987) ====
- "Somewhere Over the Rainbow"

==== Travelin' Magic (1988) ====
- "On the Road to Where We're Going"
- "Beep Beep"

==== Bathtime Magic (1990) ====
- "Splish Splash"

==== Dancin' Magic (1991) ====
- "Limbo Rock"
- "Dinosaur Rock N' Roll"
- "The Martian Hop"
- "Happy Feet"
- "The Loco-Motion"
- "Barefootin'"
- "La Bamba"

== Filmography ==
=== Videos ===
- Simply Magic: The Rainy Day Adventure (1993) – Herself, various roles
- Simply Magic: The Extra-Special Substitute Teacher (1994) – Herself, various roles
- Recycle Wranglers (1997) - Herself

=== Television appearances ===
Bartels has been a guest on several television shows and channels, such as Good Morning America on ABC, The Today Show on NBC, Storytime on PBS, CNN, Disney Channel and Music City Tonight on TNN.
