= Dirt Track Date =

Studio album by Southern Culture on the Skids
- Released: 1995
- Genres: Roots rock; rockabilly; country
- Label: DGC
- Producers: Mark Williams and SCOTS

Southern Culture on the Skids chronology
Ditch Diggin' (1994)	Dirt Track Date (1995)	Plastic Seat Sweat (1997)

Dirt Track Date is an album by Southern Culture on the Skids, released in 1995. It was the band's first album for DGC Records. The band attracted some attention with the release of the song "Camel Walk".

== Production ==
The album was produced by Mark Williams, and was recorded at Reflection Studios, in Charlotte, North Carolina.

== Critical reception ==
Professional ratings
Review scores
Source	Rating
AllMusic	4.5/5 stars
The Encyclopedia of Popular Music	4/5 stars
Los Angeles Times	3/4 stars
MusicHound Rock: The Essential Album Guide	4/5 stars

Trouser Press wrote: "Lacking the ebullient sense of reckless fun that fueled their best work, Dirt Track Date runs on nothing but the fumes of shtick." No Depression called the album "one hell of a brainless good time," but lamented the relative lack of Mary Huff vocals. The Los Angeles Times described it as "reeling rockabilly and corny country."

== Track listing ==
All songs were written by Rick Miller, except "Nitty Gritty" by Lincoln Chase, and arranged by the band.

1. "Voodoo Cadillac" - 4:40
2. "Soul City" - 2:36
3. "Greenback Fly" - 3:47
4. "Skullbucket" - 2:40
5. "Camel Walk" - 2:37
6. "White Trash" - 2:03
7. "Firefly" - 3:24
8. "Make Mayan a Hawaiian" - 2:24
9. "Fried Chicken and Gasoline" - 4:17
10. "Nitty Gritty" - 2:30
11. "8 Piece Box" - 4:02
12. "Galley Slave" - 3:00
13. "Whole Lotta Things" - 2:29
14. "Dirt Track Date" - 8:39

== Personnel ==
- David Hartman – drums, maracas, vocals
- Mary Huff – organ, bass, vocals, handclapping
- Michael Lipton – steel guitar
- Rick Miller – guitar, composer, tambourine, vocals
- Soul City Singers – vocals (background)
- Southern Culture on the Skids – producer
- Mark Williams – producer
