= Swingin' the Alphabet =

1938 novelty song sung by the Three Stooges

"Swingin' the Alphabet" is a novelty song sung by the Three Stooges (Moe Howard, Larry Fine, and Curly Howard) in their 1938 short film Violent Is the Word for Curly. It is the only full-length song performed by the trio in their short films, and the only time they mimed to their own pre-recorded soundtrack. It contains a censor-baiting line; when the singers start ringing the changes on the letter "F" it seems as though an obscene word will result, but it does not.

For their 1959 album The Nonsense Songbook, the Stooges re-recorded the song (retitled as "The Alphabet Song") with Moe, Larry, and Curly-Joe DeRita (filling in for Curly Howard, who died in January 1952). The letters "G", "J", "L", "M" and the "Curly's a dope" line were omitted, and new lyrics featuring the letters "N" and "R" were added.

In 2005, Stooge film historian Richard Finegan identified the composer of the song as Septimus Winner (1827–1902), who had originally published it in 1875 as "The Spelling Bee". Septimus' own version, though, appears to have been based on an earlier version called "Ba-Be-Bi-Bo-Bu", which has a centuries-old tradition.

== Origin ==
The lyrics of Septimus Winner's "Spelling Bee" (a.k.a. "Ba Be Bi Bo Bu") were slightly different. A number of schools like Harvard University used this as one of their traditional songs, which itself may have originated centuries earlier in typesetting, as a very similar song or chant was used to help train apprentice printers in the structure of language, a tradition being described as "ancient" even as early as 1740:

Whilst the Boy is upon his Knees, all the Chapellonians, with their right Arms put through the Lappets of their Coats as before, walk round him, singing the Cuz's Anthem, which is done by adding all the Vowels to the Consonants in the following Manner.
B a - ba; B e be; B i - 'bicky' bi; B o - bo; 'bicky' - bi - bo - ba - u; B u - bu; Ba-be-bi-bo-bu — And so through the rest of the Consonants.

== Notes ==
- During Curly's solo on the letters "K" and "L", he rushes the tempo on the tongue-tying lyrics, forcing the coed backing singers to keep up with him. Next, the girls "break the fourth wall" and replace the last words of the letter "L" with, "Curly's a dope."
- Sheet music for the older version of the song can be found in The Book of a Thousand Songs, edited by Albert Weir, where the composer's credit is omitted. In keeping with the book's pared-down plan, only the title verse is given, and the whole piece is nine measures in length, times however many letters one chooses to sing.

== Use in other media ==
- Part of the song was performed, under the title, "B-I-BI", by Guy Lombardo and his Royal Canadians, and recorded on September 6, 1941, for Decca records. It was assigned matrix 69710AA and released as a 78 RPM single record as Decca 4021A. Vocalists on the recording were Kenny Gardner and The Lombardo Trio. Composer credits were listed as S.K. Russell as well as J. and B. Freeland.
- The song was released as a single from the album Sillytime Magic covered by Joanie Bartels. It also appeared in the video, The Extra-Special Substitute Teacher.
- The song was performed, under the title "The Alphabet Song", by the cast of the 1980 film Forbidden Zone. Most of the lyrics of the Stooges' version were retained, although it also featured humorous – and occasionally obscene – lyrical alterations and ends with a Motown-tinged updating of the concept.
- Malcolm McLaren recorded a similar song called "B.I. Bikki" for his 1985 contractual obligation album Swamp Thing.
- Dale Gribble sings the beginning verse of the song in the King of the Hill episode "A Firefighting We Will Go", shortly before being interrupted by Hank Hill.
- The song is played during the radio-trivia minigame in Cinemaware's Three Stooges video game.
- Gene Vincent had a minor hit in 1956 with "B. I. Bicky Bi, Bo Bo Go," adapted from a song by rockabilly songwriter Jack Rhodes, Don Carter and Dub Nails, entitled "Bi I Bicky Bi Bo Bo Boo," an apparent nod to the Stooges song. Brian Setzer references this title in his Gene Vincent and Eddie Cochran tribute song "Gene and Eddie".
- The song lyrics are spoken by Ronald Reagan in an X-Presidents skit on Saturday Night Live in an attempt to communicate with members of al Qaeda guarding Osama bin Laden.
- The song is included on Joanie Bartels' album Sillytime Magic.

== See also ==
- The Name Game
