= The Belle Stars =

All-female British band

- Origin: London
- Genres: Pop rock, new wave, ska punk
- Years active: 1980–1986
- Label: Stiff Records
- Past members: Jennie Matthias; Sarah-Jane Owen; Stella Barker; Lesley Shone; Judy Parsons; Miranda Joyce; Penny Leyton; Clare Hirst

The Belle Stars were a British pop/rock band. Formed in 1980, they are best known for their 1983 hit single "Sign of the Times" as well as their cover of "Iko Iko" originally released in 1982 and featured on the soundtrack to the film Rain Man in 1988.

== Career ==
After the two-tone band The Bodysnatchers broke up in 1980, guitarists Stella Barker and Sarah-Jane Owen, saxophonist Miranda Joyce, keyboardist Penny Leyton, and drummer Judy Parsons formed a new band, recruiting bass player Lesley Shone and lead vocalist Jennie Matthias (also known as Jennie Bellestar). Their first performance was on Christmas Day 1980, before they had chosen a name.

Within a short time, the group became well-known around London, notably appearing on the front cover of Sounds magazine early in 1981. Shortly thereafter, they were signed by Stiff Records, then highly successful through its star act, Madness.

The band's debut single, "Hiawatha", was released in the late spring of 1981; it was produced by Madness producers Clive Langer and Alan Winstanley. The band promoted the single by playing support slots at gigs by ska acts The Beat and Madness. However, the single failed to chart, despite continuing media attention. In May 1981, the band opened for The Clash on tour dates in Brussels, Lille, and Paris.

The same production team were responsible for "Slick Trick", the second single. It too failed to chart. Keyboard player Penny Leyton left the band late in the year, to be replaced on saxophone and keyboards by Clare Hirst.

When the third single, the radio-friendly "Another Latin Love Song" again failed to break into the chart, the band tried cover versions instead, with some success. "Iko Iko", a cover of The Dixie Cups' 1965 hit, was The Belle Stars' long-hoped-for UK Singles Chart debut, peaking at number 35 in June 1982. This single was released at the same time as another version by Natasha England, whose version went on to reach the UK Top Ten. The Belle Stars furthered this with "The Clapping Song" (their first top 20 hit), a remake of the 1965 Shirley Ellis hit, and then "Mockingbird", a hit for Inez and Charlie Foxx in 1963 and James Taylor and Carly Simon in 1974.

In January 1983, the Belle Stars released what would be their signature single, "Sign of the Times", peaking at number three, and a chart success throughout Europe. The song's music video, showing the Belle Stars in dinner jackets, was also played frequently by MTV in the United States. The song went on to become the 30th-best selling single of 1983 in the UK. "Sign of the Times" was produced by Peter Collins for Loose Ends Productions, a company managed by Pete Waterman before he became famous as a third of the Stock/Aitken/Waterman production team.

"Sign of the Times" was followed a month later by the band's eponymous debut album, which reached number 15 on the UK Albums Chart. As with the band's singles, it was a mix of original songs and cover versions, including Bob and Earl's "Harlem Shuffle" (covered three years later by the Rolling Stones on Dirty Work) and Al Wilson's "The Snake".

However, "Sign of the Times" proved to be the peak of the band's success. Each follow-up single was less successful than its predecessor: "Sweet Memory" reached number 22 in the chart in April 1983; "Indian Summer" number 52 in August; whilst "The Entertainer" did not chart. It took another year before the band had a minor hit, "80's Romance", which made number 71 in August 1984 before it dropped out after a week. Despite this, the band continued to tour throughout Europe. However, the lack of success took its toll, and Matthias left the band, followed by others, until the band was down to Owen, Joyce, and Shone. Owen became the 'de facto' lead vocalist, though all three members often sang in unison, in the style of Bananarama.

Stiff Records was ailing by 1984, and it merged with Island Records; in July 1985 it was liquidated and bought by ZTT, the label owned by the husband-and-wife team of producer Trevor Horn and Jill Sinclair.

In 1986, under Horn's supervision, the three remaining members recorded a new Belle Stars album in New York City with the 4th & Broadway production team. However, the only tracks to be released were those on the single "World Domination" (with B-Side tracks: "Just a Minute" plus "Rock me to the Top"). "World Domination" flopped in Britain, but peaked at number two for two weeks on the Billboard Hot Dance/Disco chart in the US. The full album remains unreleased.

At the end of 1986 the band was asked to participate in the soundtrack to comedy movie "The Burglar" with such Hollywood stars as Whoopi Goldberg, Bobcat Goldthwait & G. W. Bailey. They recorded "Check In, Check Out", the song written by The Distance and his leader Bernard Edwards. It was recorded by the band in Los Angeles, Cherokee Studios. The album with all the soundtrack to the movie was released in March of 1987. Following this release, the band broke up.

In March 1989, the Belle Stars finally had a big US chart hit, when "Iko Iko" reached number 14 on the Billboard Top 100 after it was included on the soundtrack of the film Rain Man, starring Tom Cruise and Dustin Hoffman. The song had been a favourite of Hoffman's. Matthias toured the US to promote the song. It also featured on the soundtrack of the 2009 feature film The Hangover.

Leyton went on to join the all-girl ska band The Deltones in 1984; they released an album on Unicorn Records in 1989.

Matthias guested on the 1973 (2007) and Decadent (2008) albums by Skaville UK. In about 2008, she formed a new ska band with Lee Thompson from Madness called The Dance Brigade; and then formed her own band, 1-Stop-Experience, with Skip McDonald, Paget King and Chico Chigas; they disbanded in 2013. She also performed at the Let's Rock 2019 festival.

In September 2019, four previously unreleased Belle Stars songs from the Anne Dudley sessions for the second album, and a live concert from 1983, were included in a comprehensive box set, Turn Back the Clock from Edsel Records.

== Personnel ==
- Jennie Matthias: lead vocals (1981–1984)
- Sarah Jane Owen: lead guitar, vocals (1981–1986)
- Stella Barker: rhythm guitar, percussion, vocals (1981–1984)
- Lesley Shone: bass, vocals (1981–1986)
- Judy Parsons: drums, percussion (1981–1984)
- Miranda Joyce: alto saxophone, percussion, vocals (1981–1986)
- Penny Leyton: keyboards, piano (1981–1982)
- Clare Hirst: tenor saxophone, keyboards, piano, vocals (1982–1984)

== Discography ==
=== Albums ===
Year	Title	Details	Peak chart positions							
Year	Title	Details	UK	AUS	CAN	NL	NOR	NZ	SWE	US
1983	The Belle Stars	Released: January 1983; Label: Stiff	15	76	96	25	15	27	28	191
1994	The Very Best	Released: 1994; Label: Stiff	—	—	—	—	—	—	—	—
2004	Belle-Issima! Sweet Memories...	Released: 24 May 2004; Label: Edsel	—	—	—	—	—	—	—	—
2010	80's Romance: The Complete Belle Stars	Released: 25 October 2010; Label: Salvo	—	—	—	—	—	—	—	—
2019	Turn Back the Clock	Released: 20 September 2019; Label: Edsel; Box set with DVD	—	—	—	—	—	—	—	—
"—" denotes releases that did not chart or were not released

=== Singles and EPs ===
Year	Single	Peak chart positions									
Year	Single	UK	AUS	CAN	GER	IRE	NL	NZ	SA	US	US Dance
1981	"Hiawatha"	—	—	—	—	—	—	—	—	—	—
1981	"Slick Trick"	—	—	—	—	—	—	—	—	—	—
1981	Another Latin Love Song (EP)	—	—	—	—	—	—	—	—	—	—
1982	"Iko Iko"	35	—	—	—	—	—	35	—	—	—
1982	"The Clapping Song"	11	4	—	64	19	—	32	2	—	—
1982	"Mockingbird"	51	—	—	—	—	—	—	—	—	—
1982	"Sign of the Times"	3	45	—	—	2	6	21	—	75	43
1983	"Sweet Memory"	22	—	—	—	30	—	—	—	—	—
1983	"Indian Summer"	52	—	—	—	—	—	—	—	—	—
1983	"The Entertainer"	95	—	—	—	—	—	—	—	—	—
1984	"80's Romance"	71	—	—	—	—	—	—	—	—	—
1986	"World Domination"	—	—	—	—	—	—	—	—	—	2
1989	"Iko Iko" (re-release)	98	7	42	30	—	—	—	—	14	7
"—" denotes releases that did not chart or has not yet been released
