= Mockingbird (Inez & Charlie Foxx song) =

1963 single by Inez and Charlie Foxx

Single by Inez and Charlie Foxx

from the album Mockingbird
- B-side: "Jaybirds"
- Released: 1963
- Recorded: 1963
- Genre: Soul
- Length: 2:38
- Label: Symbol
- Songwriters: Inez and Charlie Foxx

Inez and Charlie Foxx singles chronology
| "Mockingbird" (1963) | "Hi Diddle Diddle" (1963) |

"Mockingbird" is a 1963 song written and recorded by Inez and Charlie Foxx, based on the lullaby "Hush, Little Baby".

== Background ==
The original single was credited to Inez Foxx with vocal accompaniment by her brother Charlie, as they alternated the lyric on a syllabic basis. Considered something of a novelty song, it was a great success for them upon its release by Sue Records (Symbol Records), reaching number 2 on the U.S. Top Black Singles / Rhythm & Blues chart and number 7 on the U.S. popular music singles chart in late summer 1963. Chris Blackwell of Island Records company heard "Mockingbird" playing in a record store in Kingston, Jamaica and flew to New York City to negotiate the track's U.K. release; resultantly Island Records leased the Sue brand for UK distribution to vend the American company's output in the U.K., beginning with "Mockingbird" in December 1963. However "Mockingbird" would not become a U.K. success until its 1969 re-issue when it scored No. 33.

The song was covered by Dusty Springfield for her album A Girl Called Dusty (1964); Springfield sang both parts of the track. "Mockingbird" was also recorded by Aretha Franklin for her album Runnin' Out of Fools (1965); Franklin performed the song (with Ray Johnson providing the counter-vocal) on the March 10, 1965, episode of the TV program Shindig!. Franklin's version of "Mockingbird" was one of several tracks to which Columbia Records company gave a single release after the singer's commercial success with Atlantic Records in 1967; released at the same time as Franklin's Atlantic single album "Chain of Fools"—which would reach #2—Franklin's version of "Mockingbird" scored two weeks at No. 94 on the Billboard Hot 100 in December 1967.

== Carly Simon and James Taylor version ==
"Mockingbird"

Single by Carly Simon and James Taylor

from the album Hotcakes
- B-side: "Grownup"
- Released: January 7, 1974
- Recorded: Autumn 1973
- Studio: The Hit Factory, New York City
- Genre: Rock
- Length: 4:11 (album version); 3:45 (single version)
- Label: Elektra 45880
- Songwriters: Inez and Charlie Foxx
- Producer: Richard Perry

Carly Simon singles chronology
| "The Right Thing to Do" (1973) | "Mockingbird" (1974) | "Haven't Got Time for the Pain" (1974) |

James Taylor singles chronology
| "One Man Parade" (1973) | "Mockingbird" (1974) | "How Sweet It Is (To Be Loved by You)" (1975) |

American singer-songwriters and then husband-and-wife duo Carly Simon and James Taylor recorded a remake of "Mockingbird" in the autumn of 1973, and the track was released as the lead single from Simon's fourth studio album Hotcakes (1974). It was Taylor's idea to remake "Mockingbird", which he knew from a live performance by Inez and Charlie Foxx at the Apollo Theater in 1965, and which song Taylor and his sister Kate Taylor had often sung for fun as teenagers. The song features a considerable lyrical adjustment by Taylor and keyboard work from Dr. John, Robbie Robertson's rhythm guitar and a tenor saxophone solo by Michael Brecker.

Simon overcame her fear of live performing to come onstage to sing "Mockingbird" with Taylor during his 1975 tour; the duo also performed "Mockingbird" live at the No Nukes Concert at Madison Square Garden in September 1979, the performance being recorded for the double LP album No Nukes: The Muse Concerts for a Non-Nuclear Future (1979) and the film version No Nukes (1980). In recent years Taylor has performed "Mockingbird" live with his daughter (by Simon) Sally Taylor and Simon has performed the song live with her and Taylor's son Ben Taylor. On November 25, 2015, Simon sang a live duet of "Mockingbird" with Stephen Colbert on "The Late Show with Stephen Colbert".

=== Reception ===
"Mockingbird" became an instant hit, peaking at No. 5 on the Billboard Pop singles chart and No. 10 on the Billboard Adult Contemporary chart, and was certified Gold by the RIAA, signifying sales of one million copies in the US. The single also charted in Canada (No. 3), New Zealand (No. 7), Australia (No. 8), South Africa (No. 13), and the UK (No. 34).

Cash Box called it a "great re-working of this big 60’s hit," saying that "the fresh approach is keyed by a beautiful vocal interchange between the couple and a great dixieland horn arrangement." Record World said that "They just don't make tunes as funky as this anymore!"

=== Track listing ===
7" single

- "Mockingbird" – 3:45
- "Grownup" – 3:44

=== Chart history ===
Weekly charts

| Chart (1974) | Peak position |
|---|---|
| Australia Kent Music Report | 8 |
| Canadian RPM Top Singles | 3 |
| New Zealand (Listener) | 6 |
| Quebec (ADISQ) | 12 |
| South Africa (Springbok Radio) | 13 |
| UK Singles Chart | 34 |
| US Billboard Pop Singles (Hot 100) | 5 |
| US Billboard Adult Contemporary Tracks | 10 |
| US Cash Box Top 100 | 3 |

Year-end charts

| Chart (1974) | Rank |
|---|---|
| Australia | 89 |
| Canada | 49 |
| US Billboard Hot 100 | 52 |
| US Cash Box Top 100 | 39 |

=== Certifications ===
| Region | Certification | Certified units/sales |
|---|---|---|
| United States (RIAA) | Gold | 1,000,000^{^} |
^{^} Shipments figures based on certification alone.

=== Australia: Johnny O'Keefe ===
In Australia, the Simon/Taylor version of "Mockingbird" charted simultaneously with another version – this one featuring essentially the original lyrics – by Johnny O'Keefe sung with his resident background vocalist Margaret McLaren; the two versions were ranked in tandem on the charts, peaking at No. 8 for four weeks beginning in May 1974. O'Keefe, who had performed "Mockingbird" in 1964 as compere of the Sing Sing Sing musical show, had recorded the track with McLaren in October 1972, the track having a single release in 1973 and appearing on the local "hit parade" in Adelaide that November around the time the Simon/Taylor version was recorded; O'Keefe, who believed that the Simon/Taylor version was effectively a cover version resulting from Festival Records company selling the O'Keefe version to American record companies, lobbied the Minister for Media and the Broadcasting Control Board to have his version of "Mockingbird" receive at least equal broadcasting time with the Simon/Taylor version on Australian radio.

In the Australian stage musical Shout! based on Johnny O'Keefe's life, the characters of O'Keefe and of his mother Thelma perform "Mockingbird" as part of a sequence dramatizing O'Keefe's 1975 This is Your Life appearance. The musical opened January 4, 2001, with David Campbell and Trisha Noble as respectively Johnny and Thelma; Campbell and Noble recorded their version of "Mockingbird" for the Shout! soundtrack album released that March.

== Other versions ==
"Mockingbird"

Single by the Belle Stars

from the album The Belle Stars
- B-side: "Turn Back the Clock"
- Released: October 16, 1982
- Recorded: 1982
- Genre: Synth-pop
- Length: 3:23
- Label: Stiff
- Songwriters: Inez and Charlie Foxx
- Producer: Peter Collins

The Belle Stars singles chronology
| "The Clapping Song" (1982) | "Mockingbird" (1982) | "Sign of the Times" (1983) |

The Belle Stars did a cover version of the song "Mockingbird" in 1982. It was released as their third and final cover. It peaked at No. 51 in the charts, although the single after it, "Sign of the Times", peaked at No. 3. It was the third single from the band's album The Belle Stars.

"Mockingbird"

Single by Toby Keith and Krystal Keith

from the album Greatest Hits 2
- Released: November 8, 2004
- Genre: Country
- Length: 3:32
- Label: DreamWorks
- Songwriters: Inez and Charlie Foxx
- Producers: James Stroud; Toby Keith; Lari White

Toby Keith singles chronology
| "Stays in Mexico" (2004) | "Mockingbird" (2004) | "Honkytonk U" (2005) |

Krystal Keith singles chronology
| "Mockingbird" (2004) | "Daddy Dance with Me" (2013) |

The fictional characters Lloyd and Harry sing an a cappella version in the 1994 film Dumb And Dumber.

Toby Keith reached No. 27 on Hot Country Songs in 2004 with a cover featuring his daughter, Krystal Keith. It appears on Keith's album Greatest Hits 2.

British singer Dusty Springfield performed the song as a duet with Jimi Hendrix on a 1968 episode of her ITV variety show, It Must Be Dusty. No high quality versions appear to have survived to present day, but a viewer's film of the performance has surfaced online.
