= Stays in Mexico =

Single by Toby Keith

from the album Greatest Hits 2
- Released: August 16, 2004
- Recorded: 2004
- Genre: Country
- Length: 3:35
- Label: DreamWorks Nashville
- Songwriter: Toby Keith
- Producers: James Stroud; Toby Keith

Toby Keith singles chronology
"Hey, Good Lookin'" (2004)	"Stays in Mexico" (2004)	"Mockingbird" (2004)

"Stays in Mexico" is a song written and recorded by American country music artist Toby Keith. It was released in August 2004 as the lead off single from his compilation album Greatest Hits 2. The song peaked at number 3 in the U.S. on the Billboard Hot Country Songs chart.

== Content ==
The song features a man named Steve, an insurance salesman from Sioux Falls, South Dakota, and a woman named Gina, a first-grade school teacher from Phoenix, Arizona. Both are in Cabo San Lucas without their spouses and meet in the Cabo Wabo Cantina. Steve and Gina engage in a tequila-fueled weekend affair. The song's chorus repeats that "what happens down in Mexico stays in Mexico."

The song's title is a pun on the phrase "What happens in Vegas stays in Vegas".

== Critical reception ==
Kevin John Coyne, reviewing the song for Country Universe, gave it a mixed rating. He stated that the song is "great until you process the depth of its immorality; then, you’re just sick to your stomach."

== Music video ==
The music video was directed by Michael Salomon and premiered on the television network CMT on August 19, 2004. The video was filmed on July 5, 2004, and featured Oklahoma Sooners football administrative coordinator, Matt McMillen and actress Chanel Hart as Gina. It was filmed in Acapulco, Mexico.

== Chart positions ==
"Stays in Mexico" debuted at number 27 on the U.S. Billboard Hot Country Singles & Tracks for the week of August 14, 2004.

Chart (2004)	Peak position
Canada Country (Radio & Records)	2
US Hot Country Songs (Billboard)	3
US Billboard Hot 100	51

=== Year-end charts ===
Chart (2004)	Position
US Country Songs (Billboard)	39
