= The Nitty Gritty (song) =

1963 single by Shirley Ellis

Single by Shirley Ellis

from the album The Nitty Gritty
- B-side: "Give Me a List"
- Released: 1963
- Genre: R&B, novelty
- Length: 2:12
- Label: Congress
- Songwriter: Lincoln Chase
- Producer: Hutch Davie

Shirley Ellis singles chronology
| "The Nitty Gritty" (1963) | "(That's) What the Nitty Gritty Is" (1964) |

"The Nitty Gritty"

Single by Gladys Knight & the Pips

from the album Nitty Gritty
- B-side: "Got Myself a Man"
- Released: June 26, 1969
- Recorded: 1969
- Studio: Motown
- Genre: R&B
- Length: 2:59
- Label: Soul Records
- Songwriter: Lincoln Chase
- Producer: Norman Whitfield

Gladys Knight & the Pips singles chronology
| "Didn't You Know (You'd Have to Cry Sometime)" (1969) | "The Nitty Gritty" (1969) | "Friendship Train" (1969) |

"The Nitty Gritty" is a 1963 song written by Lincoln Chase and recorded by Shirley Ellis. Released by Congress Records, it reached No. 8 on the Billboard Hot 100 in early 1964. In Canada it was No. 19 for 2 weeks.

== Cover versions ==
- Motown released a version of "The Nitty Gritty" by Gladys Knight & The Pips in mid-1969 on its Soul imprint. It reached No. 19 on the Billboard Hot 100 and No. 2 on the soul chart. In Canada it reached No. 27.
- A version by Diana Ross & The Supremes can be found on the 2001 edition of their album, Anthology.
- Southern Culture on the Skids covered it on the Dirt Track Date album.

== Popular culture ==
- The Beatles, comprising a panel on Jukebox Jury in December of 1963, gave their quick reactions to hearing the track. They liked it but all voted that it would not be a hit in the U.K. (it did not chart). George predicted that it would be a hit in the U.S. where it reached #8, saying 'the public (in the U.K.) haven't gotten round to that sort of stuff yet,' although 'just lately they've been going for the more way-out stuff and Rhythm & Blues type of stuff...We've liked this kind of stuff for years but it hasn't caught on in England.' Paul said he loved it but doubted it would be a hit because 'it doesn't say anything' and because 'lots of teenagers love this kind of music but don't buy records.'
- A televised performance of the dance associated with the song was recorded for a January 1964 episode of The Judy Garland Show, featuring choreography by Robert Banas. The performance became popular via YouTube some 60 years after its original airing, with over 18 million views as of 2013.
- The song can be heard on the final episode of Disney's streaming series Win or Lose called "Home" as Coach Dan uses the song to prepare the softball field for the game.
