= Hotcakes (album) =

Studio album by Carly Simon
- Released: January 11, 1974
- Recorded: September and October–November 1973
- Studios: Producers Workshop, Los Angeles; Hit Factory, New York City
- Genres: Rock, pop, acoustic
- Length: 38:41
- Label: Elektra
- Producer: Richard Perry

Carly Simon chronology
No Secrets (1972)	Hotcakes (1974)	Playing Possum (1975)

Singles from Hotcakes
- 1. "Mockingbird" Released: January 7, 1974; 2. "Haven't Got Time for the Pain" Released: April 1974

Hotcakes is the fourth studio album by American singer-songwriter Carly Simon, released by Elektra Records, on January 11, 1974. Featuring the major hits "Haven't Got Time for the Pain" and "Mockingbird", the latter a duet with her then-husband James Taylor, Hotcakes became one of Simon's biggest selling albums. Her first concept album, the autobiographical songs portray Simon happily married and beginning a family.

The album's cover photo, taken by Ed Caraeff in late 1973, shows Simon sitting in a maternity dress, pregnant with her first child, Sally. Produced by Richard Perry who had previously helmed No Secrets, the album features Simon on piano, including the final track "Haven't Got Time for the Pain". The string-and-percussion outro at the end of the album was composed by cellist Paul Buckmaster and drummer Ralph MacDonald.

== Songs ==
According to AllMusic critic William Ruhlmann, in "Misfit" "a wife implores her carousing husband to come home." Simon said of "Misfit" that "At times now when I'm at the point of despair I'm not as inclined to write about it as I used to be. That's what the lines mean in 'Misfit'. 'It is hip to be miserable when you're young and intellectual. In a bit you'll admit you're a misfit.' It's making fun of neurotic persons who want to be more neurotic so they can be a real artist. They think the only way they can be a real artist is if they're neurotic."

"Think I'm Gonna Have a Baby" is another domestically oriented song in which Simon celebrates the joy of anticipating having a baby.

Simon said that "Just Not True" is about herself. She said "'You stick with me when I wish you'd gone.' I've had that experience. I've wanted to obliterate somebody from my thoughts and the more I try to do it the more obvious it becomes I can't. In this case it's about trying to pretend a certain dark side of my own nature is not there and it creeps up from behind and is shouting in my ears."

Simon wrote "Forever My Love" together with Taylor. She said "I wrote the music first and James wrote the lyric just before I recorded it. He doesn't sing on that track. He played on most of the cuts on the album. His guitar is a nice feature on the album. He has such a special style. He doesn't sound like anyone else."

== Commercial performance ==
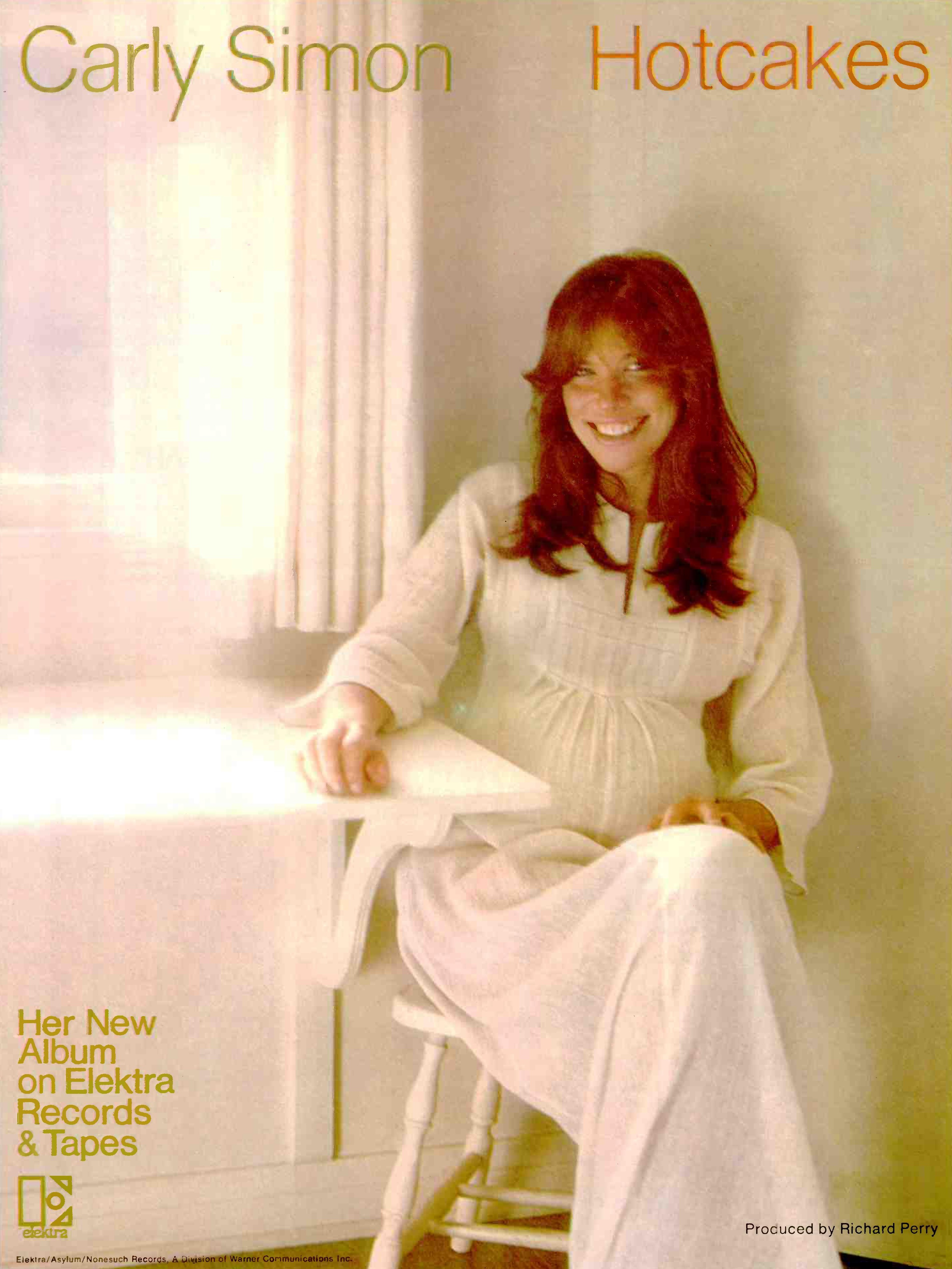
1974 trade ad for the album

Shortly after its release, Hotcakes was certified Gold by the RIAA, for sales "of one million dollars at manufacturer's level" in the United States. Elektra chose to release two other very prominent albums at the same time: Bob Dylan's Planet Waves and Joni Mitchell's Court and Spark. This decision very likely hurt sales of Hotcakes, and Simon was consequently angry with her label. Planet Waves hit No. 1 on the Billboard 200, Court and Spark hit No. 2, and Hotcakes peaked at No. 3. However, Hotcakes remained on the chart much longer than Planet Waves, and sold many more copies.

== Reception ==
Professional ratings
Review scores
Source	Rating
AllMusic	4/5 stars
Christgau's Record Guide	C

Jon Landau, writing in Rolling Stone, stated Simon's ..."Hotcakes is playful-sounding with some serious overtones — a balance that best suits her for the time being." He also stated that "'Think I'm Gonna Have a Baby,' 'Forever My Love' and especially 'Haven't Got Time for the Pain' are substantial songs and performances, superior to almost everything else she has so far recorded."

Robert Christgau, writing in Creem, said, "You're So Vain" left a nice afterglow—as Ellen Willis says, it proves that rock and roll is so democratic that even a rich person can make a great single. But except for the startling "Mockingbird" (buy the forty-five if you must) the album's most interesting moment occurs when Simon whistles.

William Ruhlmann's more recent review for AllMusic rated the album 4 out of 5 stars. Ruhlmann said that "Hotcakes was an autobiographical concept album that defined domestic bliss at a time when Simon's listeners also were catching their breath and turning inward."

== Track listing ==
Credits adapted from the album's liner notes.

Side one
No.	Title	Writer(s)	Length
1.	"Safe and Sound"	Carly Simon; Jacob Brackman	3:36
2.	"Mind on My Man"	Simon	2:57
3.	"Think I'm Gonna Have a Baby"	Simon	3:55
4.	"Older Sister"	Simon	3:06
5.	"Just Not True"	Simon	5:16
6.	"Hotcakes"	James Taylor	1:07

Side two
No.	Title	Writer(s)	Length
1.	"Misfit"	Simon	3:04
2.	"Forever My Love"	Simon; James Taylor	3:25
3.	"Mockingbird"	Inez Foxx; Charlie Foxx; Taylor^{[a]}	4:11
4.	"Grownup"	Simon	3:44
5.	"Haven't Got Time for the Pain"	Simon; Brackman	3:50
Total length:			38:41

Notes

- ^a signifies a writer by additional lyrics

== Personnel ==
=== Musicians ===
- Carly Simon – lead vocals, acoustic guitar (1, 3, 8), acoustic piano (2–5, 7, 10, 11), Fender Rhodes (2), whistle (2), backing vocals (5, 9)
- Kenny Ascher – acoustic piano (1, 8, 10), Hammond organ (7)
- Dr. John – acoustic piano (9), Hammond organ (9)
- David Spinozza – electric guitar (1, 3, 4, 8)
- James Taylor – acoustic guitar (2, 4, 5, 7, 8, 11), backing vocals (5), horn arrangements and conductor (6), lead vocals (9)
- Bucky Pizzarelli – electric guitar (2)
- Jimmy Ryan – acoustic guitar (4, 5, 11), electric guitar (7)
- Robbie Robertson – electric guitar (9)
- Klaus Voormann – bass guitar (1, 3, 5, 7, 8, 9, 11)
- Richard Davis – string bass (2)
- Larry Brean – slap bass (4)
- Rick Marotta – drums (1)
- Jim Keltner – drums (3, 4, 9, 11)
- Jim Gordon – drums (5)
- Billy Cobham – drums (6)
- Andy Newmark – drums (7)
- Russ Kunkel – drums (8)
- Ralph MacDonald – congas (2), percussion (3, 11)
- George Devens – cabasa (2)
- Paul Buckmaster – string and woodwind arrangements (1, 5, 7, 8, 10, 11), conductor (1, 5, 7, 8, 10, 11)
- Howard Johnson – baritone saxophone (6), tuba (6)
- Bobby Keys – tenor saxophone (6), baritone saxophone (9)
- Michael Brecker – tenor saxophone (9)
- Barry Rogers – trombone (6)
- Steve Madaio – trumpet (6)
- Lani Groves – backing vocals (3, 11)
- Carl Hall – backing vocals (3, 11)
- Tasha Thomas – backing vocals (3, 11)
- Todd Graff – backing vocals (3)
- Lucy Simon – backing vocals (3)
- Benny Diggs – backing vocals (4)
- Revelation – backing vocals (4)
- Richard Perry – backing vocals (4)

=== Production ===
- Producer – Richard Perry
- Engineering and Remixing – Harry Maslin and Bill Schnee
- Assistant Engineer – Blasie Castellano
- Mastered by Doug Sax at The Mastering Lab (Los Angeles, CA).
- Art Direction and Design – Vincent Cesi at Push Pin Studios.
- Cover Photography – Ed Caraeff
- Centerfold Photography – Vieri Salvadori

== Charts ==
Chart (1974)	Peak position
Australian Albums (Kent Music Report)	9
Canada Top Albums/CDs (RPM)	7
US Billboard 200	3
Japanese Album Charts	39
UK Albums (Official Charts)	19
US Cash Box Top 100 Albums	3

== Certifications ==
Region	Certification	Certified units/sales
United States (RIAA)	Gold	500,000^{^}
^{^} Shipments figures based on certification alone.
