= No Secrets (Carly Simon album) =

Studio album by Carly Simon
- Released: November 28, 1972
- Recorded: September-October 1972
- Studios: Trident Studios, London, U.K.
- Genre: Pop rock
- Length: 35:58
- Label: Elektra
- Producer: Richard Perry

Carly Simon chronology
Anticipation (1971)	No Secrets (1972)	Hotcakes (1974)

Singles from No Secrets
- 1. "You're So Vain" Released: November 8, 1972; 2. "The Right Thing to Do" Released: March 1973

No Secrets is the third album by the American singer-songwriter Carly Simon, released by Elektra Records on November 28, 1972.

Simon's major commercial breakthrough, No Secrets spent five weeks at No. 1 on the US Billboard 200 chart and quickly went Gold, as did its lead single, "You're So Vain", which remained at No. 1 on the Billboard Hot 100 chart for three weeks and the Adult Contemporary chart for two weeks. The second single, "The Right Thing to Do", reached No. 17 on the Billboard Hot 100 and No. 4 on the Adult Contemporary chart. The album was officially certified Platinum by the Recording Industry Association of America (RIAA) on December 12, 1997. It was certified Gold by the British Phonographic Industry (BPI) on November 11, 2011.

In 2000 No Secrets was ranked No. 997 in Larkin's All Time Top 1000 Albums. The making of the album, including commentary from many of the main musicians and production staff, was examined in the 2017 documentary Carly Simon: No Secrets, directed by Guy Evans for Eagle Rock Film Productions and broadcast on BBC Four.

== Recording and packaging ==
"Angel from Montgomery" was recorded by Carly Simon in her first session for the No Secrets album which was produced by Paul Buckmaster and featured James Taylor's vocals and Danny Kortchmar on guitar. Simon recalls: "Elektra rejected [the tracks from that session] and...asked me to work with Richard Perry. [Elektra] didn't think Buckmaster would produce a hit record for me". Carly's sister, Joanna Simon, sang background vocals for the album.

At the invitation of producer Richard Perry, Simon recorded the album at Trident Studios in London, where Perry was keen for Simon to work with engineer Robin Cable.

The photograph for the cover, taken by Ed Caraeff, was shot in front of the Portobello Hotel, on Stanley Gardens in London's Notting Hill.

== Reception ==
Professional ratings
Review scores
Source	Rating
AllMusic	4.5/5 stars
Christgau's Record Guide	B−

Initial reviews for No Secrets were mixed to positive. Robert Christgau, writing in Creem, said, "if a horse could sing in a monotone, the horse would sound like Carly Simon, only a horse wouldn't rhyme 'yacht', 'apricot', and 'gavotte'. Is that some kind of joke?" Stephen Holden in Rolling Stone concluded that "what finally makes No Secrets so refreshing is her singing, which conveys the finest spirit of patrician generosity."

More recent reviews have been much more positive. For example, AllMusic's William Ruhlmann gave the album four-and-a-half stars (out of five). Ruhlmann noted that "You're So Vain", "set the album's saucy tone, with its air of sexually frank autobiography and its reflections on the jet-set lifestyle." He also stated that "now that she felt she had found true love, she was as willing to acknowledge her own mistakes and regrets as she was to point fingers." He concluded that "Perry paid particular attention to Simon's vocals and gave her music a new pop/rock 'buoyancy that previous albums lacked'."

"You're So Vain" was also voted No. 216 in RIAA's Songs of the Century. It remains Simon's biggest hit and is considered her signature song.

== Awards ==
Year	Award	Category	Work	Recipient(s)	Result	Ref.
1974	Grammy Awards	Record of the Year	"You're So Vain"	Carly Simon	Nominated	
1974	Grammy Awards	Song of the Year	"You're So Vain"	Carly Simon	Nominated	
1974	Grammy Awards	Best Pop Vocal Performance, Female	"You're So Vain"	Carly Simon	Nominated	
1974	Grammy Awards	Best Engineered Recording – Non-Classical	No Secrets	Robin Geoffrey Cable and Bill Schnee	Nominated	

- "You're So Vain" was inducted into the Grammy Hall of Fame in 2004.

== Track listing ==
Credits adapted from the album's liner notes.

Side one
No.	Title	Writer(s)	Length
1.	"The Right Thing to Do"	Carly Simon	2:57
2.	"The Carter Family"	Simon; Jacob Brackman	3:29
3.	"You're So Vain"	Simon	4:17
4.	"His Friends Are More Than Fond of Robin"	Simon	3:00
5.	"We Have No Secrets"	Simon	3:57

Side two
No.	Title	Writer(s)	Length
1.	"Embrace Me, You Child"	Simon	4:06
2.	"Waited So Long"	Simon	4:30
3.	"It Was So Easy"	Simon; Brackman	3:06
4.	"Night Owl"	James Taylor	3:47
5.	"When You Close Your Eyes"	Simon; Bill Mernit	3:05
Total length:			35:58

== Personnel ==
=== Musicians ===
- Carly Simon – lead vocals (all tracks), backing vocals, acoustic piano (1–4, 10), string arrangements (3), ARP synthesizer arrangements (4), acoustic guitar (5–8)
- David Hentschel – ARP synthesizer (4)
- Peter Robinson – acoustic piano (6)
- Nicky Hopkins – acoustic piano (7, 9)
- Bill Payne – organ (7)
- Paul Keough – acoustic guitar (5, 8)
- Lowell George – slide guitar (7)
- Jimmy Ryan – bass guitar (1, 10), guitar (2, 3), acoustic guitar (4, 10), lead guitar (5), electric guitar (6–9)
- Klaus Voormann – bass guitar (2, 3, 5–9)
- Andy Newmark – drums (1, 2, 6, 8, 10)
- Jim Gordon – drums (3, 5)
- Jim Keltner – drums (7, 9)
- Ray Cooper – congas (1, 9)
- Richard Perry – percussion (3)
- Bobby Keys – tenor saxophone (9)
- Kirby Johnson – string arrangements (1, 2, 5), horn arrangements (1), woodwind arrangements (2), conductor (5), electric piano (5)
- Paul Buckmaster – orchestration (3), synthesizers (6, 10); orchestra, synthesizer and woodwind arrangements (6, 10), conductor (6, 10)
- Vicki Brown – backing vocals (1)
- Liza Strike – backing vocals (1)
- Mick Jagger – backing vocals (3)
- James Taylor – backing vocals (7)
- Bonnie Bramlett – backing vocals (9)
- Linda McCartney – backing vocals (9)
- Paul McCartney – backing vocals (9)
- Doris Troy – backing vocals (9)

=== Production ===
- Richard Perry – producer
- Robin Geoffrey Cable – engineer, recording, remixing
- Mark Berry – recording
- Bill Schnee – engineer, remixing
- Doug Sax – disc cutting
- Robert L. Heimall – art direction, design
- Ed Caraeff – cover photography
- Peter Simon – inner sleeve photography
- David Katz – musicians contractor

== Charts ==
=== Weekly charts ===
Chart (1973)	Peak position
Australian Albums (Kent Music Report)	1
Canada Top Albums/CDs (RPM)	1
Finnish Albums (Suomen virallinen lista)	19
German Albums (Offizielle Top 100)	39
Italian Albums (Musica e dischi)	4
Japanese Albums (Oricon)	3
Norwegian Albums (VG-lista)	6
UK Albums (Official Charts)	3
US Billboard 200	1
Scottish Albums (Official Charts)	45
US Cash Box Top 100 Albums	1

=== Year-end charts ===
Chart (1973)	Position
Australian Albums (Kent Music Report)	7
US Billboard 200	4

== Certifications ==
Region	Certification	Certified units/sales
Japan	—	105,770
United Kingdom (BPI)	Gold	100,000^{^}
United States (RIAA)	Platinum	1,000,000^{^}
^{^} Shipments figures based on certification alone.
