= Mojo Box =

Studio album by Southern Culture on the Skids
- Released: January 27, 2004
- Length: 41:35
- Label: Yep Roc Records

Southern Culture on the Skids chronology
Liquored Up and Lacquered Down (2000)	Mojo Box (2004)	Doublewide and Live (2006)

Professional ratings
Review scores
Source	Rating
AllMusic	4/5 stars
Music Box	3/5 stars

Mojo Box is an album by Southern Culture on the Skids. It was released on January 27, 2004, via Yep Roc Records. It was recorded at the band's Kudzu Ranch studio.

== Track listing ==
1. "Smiley Yeah Yeah Yeah"
2. "Mojo Box"
3. "Doublewide"
4. "I Want a Love"
5. "'69 El Camino"
6. "The Wet Spot"
7. "Soulful Garage"
8. "Biff Bang Pow"
9. "Where Is The Moon"
10. "Fire of Love"
11. "Swamp Fox"
12. "The Sweet Spot"
13. "It's All Over But The Shoutin'"
14. "John Harris Is a Rock God'"
