= Anticipation (Carly Simon album) =

Studio album by Carly Simon
- Released: November 1971
- Recorded: Late Summer 1971
- Studios: Morgan Studios, London, England
- Genres: Rock; acoustic
- Length: 37:23
- Label: Elektra
- Producer: Paul Samwell-Smith

Carly Simon chronology
| Carly Simon (1971) | Anticipation (1971) | No Secrets (1972) |

Singles from Anticipation
- 1. "Anticipation" Released: November 25, 1971; 2. "Legend in Your Own Time" Released: 1972; 3. "The Girl You Think You See" Released: 1972

Anticipation is the second studio album by American singer-songwriter Carly Simon, released by Elektra Records, in November 1971.

The title track and lead single, "Anticipation", became a smash top-20 chart hit in the U.S.; it was later used as the soundtrack for several television commercials for Heinz ketchup starting in 1973. The song relates Simon's state of mind as she waits to go on a date with Cat Stevens. The album cover artwork is a photo of Simon taken by Peter Simon at the gates of Queen Mary's Garden in London's Regent's Park.

The closing song, "I've Got to Have You" (written by Kris Kristofferson), was released as a single in Australia and reached number six on the Australian charts in 1972. "Share the End" was remixed and remastered in 2025 and released as a single.

== Reception and recording ==
Professional ratings
Review scores
| Source | Rating |
|---|---|
| AllMusic | 3.5/5 stars |

Writing in Rolling Stone, Stephen Davis gave a glowing review of the album. He called the title track "a spirited examination of the tensions involved in a burgeoning romantic situation in which nobody has any idea of what's going on or what's going to happen." He also singled out the tracks "Our First Day Together", calling it "a quiet song, lovely and quite enigmatic, with a trace of the minor chord influence of Joni Mitchell," and "I've Got To Have You", calling it "an absolute clincher, an awesome description of the psychic ravages of gone-nuts, know-nothing love. As Carly performs it, it becomes a tour de force, and a stern reminder to those of us who might have forgotten that passion is the ruler of man, not reason. When Carly moans 'I can't help it ... I've got to have you,' we're being shown something so primal and so private that it takes your breath away."

A more recent review from AllMusic's William Ruhlmann continued the praise. Ruhlmann rated the album 31/2-stars-out-of-5 and stated the album "found [Simon] extending the gutsy persona she had established on her debut album." Cash Box described "The Girl You Think You See" as "a chart item any way you look at it," describing it as a "ballad with a rhythmic and lyrical twist." Record World called it a "thoughtfully written and appropriately tuneful song." In 1973, Anticipation was certified gold by the RIAA, for sales of over 500,000 copies in the United States.

On her experience of recording the album, Simon later said: "It was one of the best memories I shall ever have of recording. I had a band. The entire album was just that band (Andy Newmark, Jimmy Ryan, Paul Glanz) and myself. Cat Stevens did some vocals and there were strings on a few songs, but on the whole, it was sparse, and I loved it."

== Awards ==
| Year | Award | Category | Work | Result | Ref. |
|---|---|---|---|---|---|
| 1973 | Grammy Awards | Best Pop Vocal Performance, Female | Anticipation | Nominated | |

== Track listing ==
Credits adapted from the album's liner notes.

Side one
| No. | Title | Writer(s) | Length |
|---|---|---|---|
| 1. | "Anticipation" | Carly Simon | 3:19 |
| 2. | "Legend in Your Own Time" | Simon | 3:45 |
| 3. | "Our First Day Together" | Simon | 3:29 |
| 4. | "The Girl You Think You See" | Simon; Jacob Brackman | 3:07 |
| 5. | "Summer's Coming Around Again" | Simon; Jim Ryan; Paul Glanz | 4:10 |

Side two
| No. | Title | Writer(s) | Length |
|---|---|---|---|
| 1. | "Share the End" | Simon; Brackman | 3:58 |
| 2. | "The Garden" | Simon; Brackman | 4:08 |
| 3. | "Three Days" | Simon | 3:19 |
| 4. | "Julie Through the Glass" | Simon | 3:23 |
| 5. | "I've Got to Have You" | Kris Kristofferson | 4:45 |
| Total length: | | | 37:23 |

== Personnel ==
=== Musicians ===
- Carly Simon – pianos, acoustic guitar, all vocals
- Paul Glanz – pianos
- Jim Ryan – acoustic guitar, electric guitars, bass guitar
- John Ryan – double bass
- Andy Newmark – drums, percussion
- Del Newman – horn and string arrangements

=== Production ===
- Producer – Paul Samwell-Smith
- Production Supervisor – Jac Holzman
- Engineer – Michael Bobak
- Editing – Barry Hammond
- Mastered by Lee Hulko at Sterling Sound (New York, NY).
- Art Direction and Design – Robert Heimall
- Photography – Peter Simon

== Charts ==
| Chart (1971) | Peak position |
|---|---|
| Australian Albums (Kent Music Report) | 55 |
| Canada Top Albums/CDs (RPM) | 36 |
| US Billboard 200 | 30 |
| US Cash Box Top 100 Albums | 31 |

== Certifications ==
| Region | Certification | Certified units/sales |
|---|---|---|
| United States (RIAA) | Gold | 500,000^{^} |
^{^} Shipments figures based on certification alone.
