= Attitude Dancing =

Single by Carly Simon

from the album Playing Possum
- B-side: "Are You Ticklish"
- Released: May 1975
- Recorded: 1975
- Genre: Pop, rock
- Length: 3:52
- Label: Elektra
- Songwriters: Carly Simon; Jacob Brackman
- Producer: Richard Perry

Carly Simon singles chronology
"Haven't Got Time for the Pain" (1974)	"Attitude Dancing" (1975)	"Waterfall" (1975)

"Attitude Dancing" is a song written by Carly Simon and Jacob Brackman, performed by Simon and produced by Richard Perry. The song served as lead single from Simon's fifth studio album, Playing Possum (1975).

The single became a top 40 hit, peaking at No. 21 on the Billboard Pop singles chart and No. 18 on the Billboard Adult Contemporary chart. The single also charted in Australia, peaking at No. 70 on the ARIA Charts, and was a top 40 hit in Canada, peaking at No. 21. It was included as the final track on The Best of Carly Simon, released later in the same year. Simon later included the track on her two-disc career retrospective set Anthology, released in 2002. Carole King provided backing vocals on the track. Simon was the pianist on the track.

== Critical reception ==
Stephen Holden, writing for Rolling Stone, called the track "the album's showstopper" and went on to say: "Easily the most exciting Carly Simon cut since "You're So Vain," "Attitude Dancing" boasts nifty nonsense lyrics by Jacob Brackman and one of Richard Perry's tour de force productions: strutting horns, razorsharp string lines, perfect backup vocals by various luminaries and Jim Gordon's impeccable, essential drumming. Simon's vocal is genuinely sassy; she even lets herself growl a bit." The song was the first real disco hit of both herself and of her record label at the time, Elektra Records. Billboard called it "a fine rocker with a combination fun/serious storyline," and also praised the vocal performances. Cash Box said it contains "the same, vibrant qualities which have made her past efforts so successful."

== Track listing ==
7" single

- "Attitude Dancing" – 3:43
- "Are You Ticklish" – 2:26

== Chart history ==
Chart (1975)	Peak position
Australia (ARIA Charts)	70
Canada (RPM) Top Singles	21
Canada (RPM) Adult Contemporary	26
US Billboard Pop Singles (Hot 100)	21
US Billboard Adult Contemporary	18
