= Playing Possum =

Studio album by Carly Simon
- Released: April 16, 1975
- Recorded: 1974–1975
- Studios: Sound Labs, Sunset Sound Recorders, Crystal Sound, A&M Studios and Burbank Studios, California
- Genres: Rock; pop; disco; jazz
- Length: 34:48
- Label: Elektra
- Producer: Richard Perry

Carly Simon chronology
Hotcakes (1974)	Playing Possum (1975)	The Best of Carly Simon (1975)

Singles from Playing Possum
- 1. "Attitude Dancing" Released: May 1975; 2. "Waterfall" Released: 1975; 3. "More and More" Released: 1975

Playing Possum is the fifth studio album by American singer-songwriter Carly Simon, released by Elektra Records, on April 16, 1975.

It was Simon's third consecutive album to reach the top 10 on the Billboard Pop albums chart, peaking at No. 10 in June 1975. The lead single from the album, "Attitude Dancing", which featured Carole King on backing vocals, was also a success, peaking at No. 21 on Billboard Pop singles chart, and No. 18 on the Billboard Adult Contemporary chart. A second single, "Waterfall", which featured prominent backing vocals by Simon's then-husband James Taylor, didn't fare as well, reaching no higher than No. 78 on the Pop singles chart. It fared much better on the Adult Contemporary chart, entering the Top 40 and peaking at No. 21. The album's third and final single "More and More" was co-written by New Orleans pianist Dr. John, who also played piano on the track, along with Ringo Starr on drums, but it peaked no higher than No. 94 on the Pop singles chart.

== Reception and packaging ==
Professional ratings
Review scores
Source	Rating
AllMusic	3/5 stars

In his review of the album, Stephen Holden of Rolling Stone said it "represents a breakthrough of sorts for Simon", in her continued shift from a "sensitive singer/songwriter role" to a "rock songstress". He wrote that "Attitude Dancing" was "easily the most exciting Carly Simon cut since 'You're So Vain.'" Other standouts from his review were "After the Storm", "Love Out in the Street", "Are You Ticklish", "Look Me in the Eyes", "Waterfall", and "Slave". Cash Box said of the single "More and More" that "Carly belts out a hard blues vocal over barrelhouse piano, with Memphis style horns and a soulful female chorus lending support."

Today, Playing Possum may best be remembered for its controversial cover photograph, which shows the singer kneeling while wearing only a black negligee, sheer-to-waist pantyhose, and knee-high black boots. The photographer was Norman Seeff. It was nominated for Best Album Package at the 18th Annual Grammy Awards in Feb. 1976. In 1991, it ranked at No. 20 on the Rolling Stone's list of the 100 greatest album covers.

Simon further included photographs from the session in the booklets accompanying her three-disc boxed set Clouds in My Coffee (1995) and the two-disc Anthology (2002). The latter also includes the singles "Attitude Dancing" and "Waterfall".

== Awards ==
Year	Award	Category	Work	Result	Ref.
1976	Grammy Awards	Best Album Package	Playing Possum^{A}	Nominated	

Notes

- ^{A} The nomination is credited to Gene Christensen. The photographer was Norman Seeff.

=== Other honors and recognitions ===
- 1991 – Playing Possum ranked No. 20 on Rolling Stone's 100 Greatest Album Covers of All-Time list.

== Track listing ==
Credits adapted from the album's liner notes.

Side one
No.	Title	Writer(s)	Length
1.	"After the Storm"	Carly Simon	2:47
2.	"Love Out in the Street"	Simon	3:40
3.	"Look Me in the Eyes"	Simon	3:34
4.	"More and More"	Mac Rebennack; Alvin Robinson	4:02
5.	"Slave"	Simon; Jacob Brackman	3:54

Side two
No.	Title	Writer(s)	Length
1.	"Attitude Dancing"	Simon; Brackman	3:52
2.	"Sons of Summer"	Billy Mernit	3:05
3.	"Waterfall"	Simon	3:31
4.	"Are You Ticklish"	Simon	2:26
5.	"Playing Possum"	Simon	3:57
Total length:			34:38

== Personnel ==
=== Musicians ===
- Carly Simon – lead vocals, acoustic piano (1, 2, 5, 6, 8, 9, 10), horn arrangements (1), string arrangements (1, 10), backing vocals (2, 3, 5–8), acoustic guitar (3)
- Billy Mernit – acoustic piano (2, 7)
- James Newton Howard – ARP synthesizer (3), electric piano (3)
- Dr. John – acoustic piano (4)
- Lee Ritenour – electric guitar (1, 5, 8), mandolin (5)
- James Taylor – acoustic guitar (3, 5, 8), backing vocals (3, 5, 8, 10)
- Jeff Baxter – guitar (4)
- Alvin Robinson – guitar (4)
- Sneaky Pete Kleinow – pedal steel guitar (10)
- Klaus Voormann – bass guitar (1, 4)
- Willie Weeks – bass guitar (2, 6, 10)
- Leland Sklar – bass guitar (5, 8)
- Joe Mondragon – bass guitar (9)
- Andrew Gold – drums (1, 10), guitar (2, 6), tambourine (2), acoustic guitar (10)
- Andy Newmark – drums (2)
- Ringo Starr – drums (4)
- Russ Kunkel – drums (5, 8)
- Jim Gordon – drums (6)
- Irving Cottler – drums (9)
- Alan Estes – percussion (1, 3)
- Emil Richards – percussion (2)
- Fred Staehle – percussion (4)
- Richard Perry – tambourine (4)
- Eddie "Bongo" Brown – congas (6)
- Trevor Lawrence – alto sax solo (1)
- Derrek Van Eaton – flute (8)
- Lon Van Eaton – clarinet (8), sitar (10)
- Tommy Morgan – harmonica (10)
- Perry Botkin Jr. – string arrangements (2, 5), orchestration (2, 5), conductor (2, 5, 9), horn and woodwind arrangements (5), clarinet and trombone arrangement (9)
- Paul Riser – horn and string arrangements (6)
- Rita Coolidge – backing vocals (2, 5)
- Clydie King – backing vocals (2, 5)
- Rodney Richmond – backing vocals (2)
- Vini Poncia – backing vocals (3)
- Julia Tillman Waters – backing vocals (4)
- Maxine Willard – backing vocals (4)
- Carolyn Willis – backing vocals (4)
- Abigale Haness – backing vocals (6)
- Carole King – backing vocals (6)
- Ken Moore – backing vocals (6)

=== Production ===
- Producer – Richard Perry
- Engineers – Bill Schnee (Tracks 1, 2 & 5–10); Norm Kinney (Track 3); Andrew Berliner (Track 4).
- Second Engineer – Charles Beasley
- Assistant Engineers – Larry Emerine and Reed Stanley
- Remixing – Norm Kinney and Bill Schnee
- Mastered by Doug Sax at The Mastering Lab (Los Angeles, CA).
- Art Direction – Glen Christensen
- Design and Photography – Norman Seeff
- Management – Arlyne Rothberg, Inc.

== Charts ==
Chart (1975)	Peak position
Australian Albums (Kent Music Report)	25
Canada Top Albums/CDs (RPM)	22
US Billboard 200	10
Japanese Album Charts	70
New Zealand Albums (RMNZ)	32
US Cash Box Top 100 Albums	9
