= The Name Game =

1964 rhyming song by Shirley Ellis

Single by Shirley Ellis

from the album The Name Game
- B-side: "Whisper to Me Wind"
- Released: November 1964
- Genre: R&B; novelty
- Length: 2:39
- Label: Congress
- Songwriters: Shirley Ellis; Lincoln Chase
- Producer: Charles Calello

Shirley Ellis singles chronology
"Such a Night" (1964)	"The Name Game" (1964)	"The Clapping Song" (1965)

"The Name Game" is a song co-written and performed by Shirley Ellis as a rhyming game that creates variations on a person's name. She explains through speaking and singing how to play the game. The first verse is done using Ellis's first name; the other names used in the original version of the song are Lincoln, Arnold, Tony, Billy, Marsha, and Nick.

== History ==
Written by American singer Shirley Ellis (who based the song on a game she played as a child) and Lincoln Chase. Ellis's recording, produced by Charles Calello, was released in late 1964 as "The Name Game". The record scored third on the Billboard Hot 100, and fourth on the magazine's R&B charts during 1965. The record was re-released in 1966 and again in 1973. An R&B singer for 10 years before that success, Ellis was also successful with "The Clapping Song (Clap Pat Clap Slap)" (No.8 pop and No.16 R&B), and "The Nitty Gritty" (No.8 on the Hot 100 and No.4 on the Cash Box R&B chart). Ellis performed on then-major television programs, including Hullabaloo, American Bandstand and The Merv Griffin Show. It later became a popular children's singalong. In Canada it reached No. 2.

== Rules ==
Using the name Katie as an example, the song follows this pattern:

Katie, Katie, bo-batie,
Bonana-fanna fo-fatie
Fee fi mo-matie
Katie!

A verse can be created for any name, with X as the name and Y as the name without the first consonant sound (if it begins with a consonant), as follows:

(X), (X), bo-b (Y)
Bonana-fanna fo-f (Y)
Fee fi mo-m (Y)
(X)!

If the name starts with a b, f, or m, that sound simply is not repeated. For example: Billy becomes "Billy Billy bo-illy"; Fred becomes "bonana fanna fo-red"; Martha becomes "fee fi mo-artha".

The song as originally performed gives no indication of what to do with names where the stress falls on a syllable after the first, like Anita or Antoinette, but during the live rendition of the song on The Merv Griffin Show, Ellis uses the same rules as explained above ("Tallulah, Tallulah, bo-ballulah"). However, the cover version on the workout video Sweatin' to the Oldies 3 (vocals by Donna Miller) suggests that the first syllable should be dropped after the name is first said; the name Madonna is sung as "Madonna-donna-bo-bonna", etc.

== Laura Branigan version ==
"Name Game"
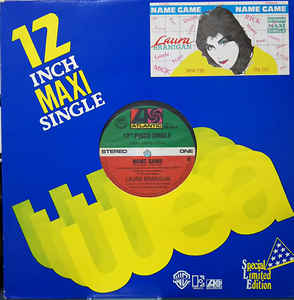

Single by Laura Branigan

from the album Touch
- B-side: "Cry Wolf"
- Released: 1988
- Genre: Synth-pop; novelty
- Length: 4:10
- Label: Atlantic
- Songwriters: Shirley Ellis; Lincoln Chase
- Producer: David Kesherbaun

Laura Branigan singles chronology
"Cry Wolf" (1988)	"Name Game" (1988)	"Come into My Life" (1988)

Laura Branigan covered the song for her 1987 fifth studio album Touch. It was released in 1988 in the Philippines as the last single from the album. The single's B-side is "Cry Wolf", which was the third single from the album.

=== Track listings ===
- Philippines 7-inch single
1. "Name Game" (edited version) – 3:44
2. "Cry Wolf" (LP version) – 4:48
- Philippines 12-inch single
1. "Name Game" (extended version) – 6:32
2. "Name Game" (edited version) – 3:44
3. "Cry Wolf" (LP version) – 4:48

== See also ==
- 1964 in music
- Nursery rhyme
- Swinging the Alphabet
