= Friendship Train (song) =

Single by Gladys Knight & the Pips

from the album Greatest Hits
- B-side: "Cloud Nine"
- Released: October 6, 1969
- Recorded: 1969
- Genre: Psychedelic soul
- Length: 3:30
- Label: Soul Records
- Songwriter(s): Norman Whitfield, Barrett Strong
- Producer(s): Norman Whitfield

Gladys Knight & the Pips singles chronology
"The Nitty Gritty" (1969)	"Friendship Train" (1969)	"You Need Love Like I Do (Don't You)" (1970)

"Friendship Train" is a song by Gladys Knight & the Pips, released as a single in October 1969. It peaked at No. 17 on the Billboard Hot 100 and No. 2 on the Billboard R&B chart.

== Chart performance ==
Chart (1969–70)	Peak position
US Billboard Hot 100	17
US Best Selling Soul Singles (Billboard)	2

== Cover versions ==
- The Temptations also recorded the song for their 1970 album Psychedelic Shack, using the same backing track as Knight's version.
- Rosetta Hightower recorded the song for her eponymous 1971 album.
