= Waterfall (Carly Simon song) =

Single by Carly Simon

from the album Playing Possum
- B-side: "After The Storm"
- Released: 1975
- Recorded: 1975
- Genre: Pop, Rock
- Length: 3:32
- Label: Elektra
- Songwriter(s): Carly Simon
- Producer(s): Richard Perry

Carly Simon singles chronology
"Attitude Dancing" (1975)	"Waterfall" (1975)	"It Keeps You Runnin'" (1976)

"Waterfall" is a song written and performed by Carly Simon, and produced by Richard Perry. The song served as the second single from Simon's fifth studio album, Playing Possum (1975).

Waterfall was not as successful on the Billboard Pop singles chart as its predecessor "Attitude Dancing", peaking only at No. 78. However, it was much more successful on the Billboard Adult Contemporary chart, reaching a peak position of No. 21. Simon later included the track on her two-disc career retrospective set Anthology, released in 2002. James Taylor provides backing vocals on the track. Simon plays the piano on the track.

== Critical reception ==
Cash Box called it "a strong ballad with an introverted lyric." Record World said that it's "most refreshing and free-flowing Simon sound that's splashin' with style."

== Track listing ==
7" single

- "Waterfall" – 3:32
- "After The Storm" – 2:46

== Charts ==
Chart (1975)	Peak Position
US Billboard Pop Singles (Hot 100)	78
US Billboard Adult Contemporary	21
