= Lincoln Chase =

American composer of hit songs

Background information
- Born: Lincoln R. Chase; June 29, 1926; New York City
- Died: October 6, 1980 (aged 54)
- Genres: Pop, R&B
- Occupations: Songwriter, singer
- Years active: 1951–1973
- Labels: Decca, RCA, Dawn, Liberty, Columbia, Paramount

Lincoln R. Chase (June 29, 1926 – October 6, 1980) was an American songwriter and occasional recording artist. As a writer, his most notable songs were "Such a Night", "Jim Dandy", and several of Shirley Ellis' hits in the early 1960s including "The Name Game" and "The Clapping Song".

== Background ==
Chase was born in New York City, the only child of West Indian immigrants. Lorenzo, his father, was born in Cuba and his mother, Edith (or Elizabeth), was a native of the British West Indies. He was raised in New York City. His wife was Monica D. Chase. His children are Alton D Chase, Leland E. Chase, and Melanie D. Chase. His grandchildren include Nadira and Ansar Chase.

== Career ==
He studied at the American Academy of Music in New York City, and signed as a recording artist for Decca Records in 1951. However, his single releases for Decca and, later, other labels including RCA, Dawn, Liberty and Columbia were unsuccessful.

As a songwriter, early recordings of his songs included "Rain Down Rain" by Big Maybelle, and "Salty Tears" by Chuck Willis (both 1952), and "Mend Your Ways" by Ruth Brown (May 1953). His first real success came when his song "Such a Night" was recorded by The Drifters, featuring Clyde McPhatter, in November 1953. The song reached No. 2 on the Billboard R&B chart in early 1954, and was covered by Johnnie Ray, whose version reached No. 1 on the UK singles chart. A version recorded by Elvis Presley in 1960 also became a hit in 1964, and the song has subsequently been recorded by many other musicians.

Chase's next major success came with "Jim Dandy," recorded on December 21, 1955, by LaVern Baker and the Gliders and released in late 1956. The song rose to No. 1 on the US R&B chart and No. 17 on the Hot 100 in early 1957. Chase also wrote the follow-up record, "Jim Dandy Got Married". He released an album on Liberty Records in 1957, The Explosive Lincoln Chase, recorded with the Spencer Hagen Orchestra.

In 1959, he met singer Shirley Ellis, and worked as her manager for the next few years. Contrary to some reports, they were never married. After collaborating on several unsuccessful singles, he wrote the song "The Nitty Gritty" for her, and it rose to No. 8 on the Hot 100 in early 1964. Several follow-ups written (or co-written) by Chase – "(That's) What The Nitty Gritty Is", "The Name Game", and "The Clapping Song (Clap Pat Clap Slap)" – also made the US pop charts.

In 1973, Chase released a second album under his own name, Lincoln Chase 'N You, on Paramount Records. Featuring drummer Idris Muhammad, it has been described as "trippy, odd and funky all at the same time....a bit like a black Frank Zappa but groovier."

Also in 1973, his song "Jim Dandy" was recorded by southern rock band Black Oak Arkansas. It hit #25 on the pop chart and featured Jim Mangrum (who had already been using "Jim Dandy" as a stage name before they covered the song) and female vocalist Ruby Starr trading off vocals. It was the first single from their 1973 album High on the Hog, the band's most commercially successful album. In Canada, the song reached #13, and was #131 in the year-end top 200.

Chase died in the Atlanta area on October 6, 1980, at the age of 54.
