= Shirley Ellis =

American singer (1929 – 2005)

- Also known as: Shirley Ellis
- Born: Shirley Marie O'Garra; January 19, 1929; The Bronx, New York City, U.S.
- Died: October 5, 2005 (aged 76) The Bronx, New York City, U.S.
- Genres: Pop; soul
- Occupations: Singer, songwriter
- Instrument: Voice
- Years active: 1958–1968
- Labels: Congress; Kapp; Columbia; Bell
- Formerly of: The Metronomes

Shirley Marie O'Garra (stage name Shirley Ellis, married name Shirley Elliston; January 19, 1929 – October 5, 2005) was an American soul music singer and songwriter of West Indian heritage. She is best known for her novelty hits "The Nitty Gritty" (1963, US no. 8), "The Name Game" (1964, US no. 3), and "The Clapping Song" (1965, US no. 8 and UK no. 6). "The Clapping Song" sold over one million copies and was awarded a gold disc.

== Biography ==
On January 19, 1929, Shirley O'Garra was born to William H. and Petra (Smith) O'Garra. Her father was a native of Montserrat, and her mother was born in the Bahamas. Shirley had three full siblings, Joyce, Bertram and William Jr., and four half siblings, Reginald, Suzanne, Joycelyn and Berbian.

On August 3, 1949, O'Garra married her husband, Arnold Alphonso Elliston (October 21, 1929 – August 23, 2009; professional name: Alphonso Elliston), in Florida.

By 1954, Ellis had written two songs recorded by the Chords. She was originally in the group the Metronomes and married the lead singer, Alphonso Elliston. All her solo hits were written by her and her manager, record producer, and songwriting partner Lincoln Chase.

Ellis had recording contracts with the Kapp Records subsidiary Congress and later Columbia and Bell.

In 1968, Ellis retired from the music industry.

On October 5, 2005, Ellis died in the Bronx section of New York City at the age of 76.

== Commercials ==
In August 2020, "The Clapping Song" was used in a TV commercial for the Samsung Galaxy Tab 7.0, and in April 2021 her "I See It, I Like It, I Want It" was in another Samsung commercial, this time for the Galaxy Z Flip 5G and Galaxy Z Fold2.

In 2023, "I See It, I Like It, I Want It" was featured in a Walmart commercial.

In 2024, "The Puzzle Song" was used in an Amazon Prime commercial.

In 2025, a cover version of "I See It, I Like It, I Want It" was featured in a Chase Bank commercial.

== Film ==
In 2021, "The Clapping Song" was used in the film Ghostbusters: Afterlife (2021). It was also featured in the first teaser trailer for the film Die My Love (2025).

== Cover versions ==
Cover versions of Ellis' hits have been recorded by Madeline Bell, the Belle Stars, Laura Branigan, Aaron Carter, Gary Glitter, Ricardo Ray, Pia Zadora, Southern Culture on the Skids, Gladys Knight & the Pips (a version of "The Nitty Gritty", produced by Norman Whitfield), and Divine, a.k.a. Harris Glenn Milstead (a hi-NRG version of "The Name Game").

The Ellis song "Soul Time" was sampled by the UK band the Go! Team for their single "Bottle Rocket".

In 2011, "The Name Game" was covered by Jessica Lange and the cast of American Horror Story: Asylum and was featured in the episode of the same name.

== Discography ==
=== Studio albums ===
- In Action (1964, Congress)
- The Name Game (1965, Congress)
- Sugar, Let's Shing-a-Ling (1967, Columbia)

=== Compilation albums ===
- The Name Game (1988, MCA Special Products)
- The Very Best of Shirley Ellis (1995, Taragon)
- The Complete Congress Recordings (2001, Connoisseur Collection)
- Three Six Nine!: The Best of Shirley Ellis (2018, Ace)

=== Singles ===
Year	Single	Peak chart positions					Album	Release date
Year	Single	US	US R&B	AUS	CAN	UK	Album	Release date
1963	"The Nitty Gritty"	8	4	—	19	—	In Action	October 25, 1963
1964	"(That's) What the Nitty Gritty Is"	72	14	—	—	—	In Action	February 18, 1964
1964	"Shy One"	130	43	—	—	—	In Action	April 9, 1964
1964	"Such a Night"	—	—	—	—	—	In Action	June 13, 1964
1964	"The Name Game"	3	4	40	2	—	The Name Game	November 12, 1964
1965	"The Clapping Song (Clap Pat Clap Slap)"	8	16	86	10	6	—N/a	March 10, 1965
1965	"The Puzzle Song (A Puzzle in Song)"/"I See It, I Like It, I Want It" (B-side)	78	—	—	32	—	—N/a	May 15, 1965
1965	"I Will Never Forget"	—	—	—	—	—	The Name Game	July 3, 1965
1965	"You Better Be Good, World"	—	—	—	—	—	—N/a	October 23, 1965
1966	"Ever See a Diver Kiss His Wife While the Bubbles Bounce About Above the Water?"	135	—	—	—	—	—N/a	January 4, 1966
1966	"Birds, Bees, Cupids and Bows"	—	—	—	—	—	Sugar, Let's Shing-a-Ling	October 17, 1966
1967	"Soul Time"	67	31	87	39	—	Sugar, Let's Shing-a-Ling	January 30, 1967
1967	"Sugar Let's Shing-a-Ling"	—	—	—	—	—	Sugar, Let's Shing-a-Ling	May 8, 1967
1978	"The Clapping Song" (re-release)	—	—	—	—	59	—N/a	June 23, 1978
"—" denotes a recording that did not chart or was not released in that territory.
