= Southern Culture on the Skids =

American rock band

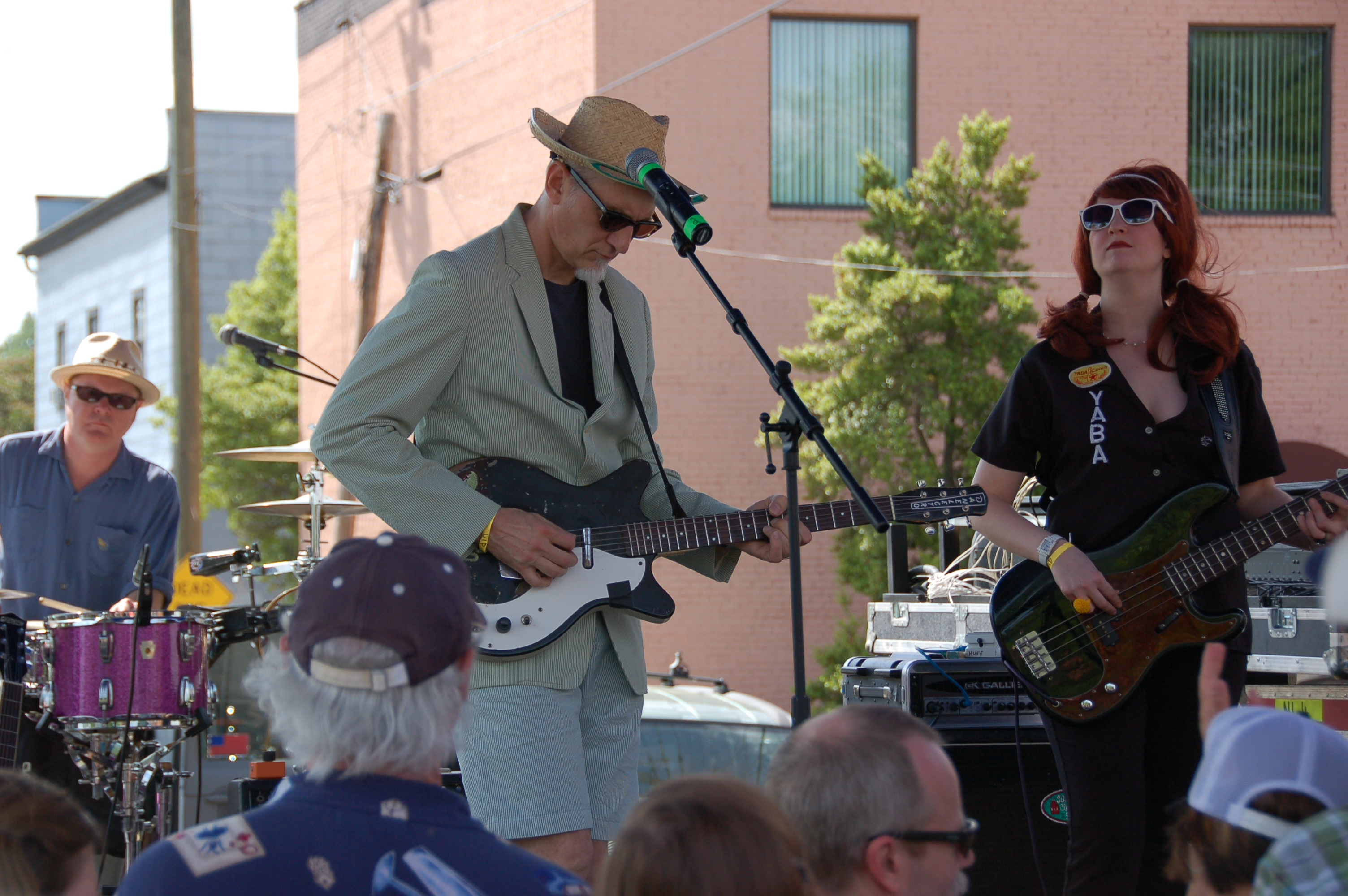
- Southern Culture on the Skids perform in Raleigh, NC, 17 April 2010. Left to right: Dave Hartman, Rick Miller, and Mary Huff.

Background information
- Origin: Chapel Hill, North Carolina
- Genres: Southern rock; Rockabilly; Swamp rock; surf
- Years active: 1983–present
- Labels: Lloyd Street; Moist; Safe House; Geffen; Estrus; TVT; Yep Roc; Kudzu
- Members: Rick Miller; Dave Hartman; Mary Huff
- Past members: Stan Lewis; Leslie Land; Chip Shelby; Chris Bess; Tim Barnes
- Website: Official website

Southern Culture on the Skids, also sometimes known as SCOTS, is an American rock band from Chapel Hill, North Carolina.

The band released their debut EP Voodoo Beach Party in 1984, followed by their self-titled debut album the following year. After these early releases, the band's line-up shifted due to a perceived lack of direction, and the band re-emerged with a new sound that encompassed a multitude of genres.

== History ==
Guitarist and founding member Rick Miller grew up dividing his time between his father's home and business in Henderson, North Carolina and his mother's home in southern California. Miller completed an art degree at the University of North Carolina in Chapel Hill. The first incarnation of Southern Culture on the Skids formed in 1983 and featured Miller on guitar, with Stan Lewis (vocals), Leslie Land (bass) and Chip Shelby (drums). Of the band's name, Miller later said "(We wanted) some kind of name that would get us some attention, ya know? We were listening to the UNC radio (station) there and they were playing an REM song. I like REM fine, but at the end of it, the DJ says, 'Ya that was REM, the sound of the new South.' I looked at my roommate and we said, 'Gawd, if that's the sound of the 'new South' I preferred it when it was on the skids.' That's how we got the name." This line-up released the EP Voodoo Beach Party, followed later in 1985 by a full-length album entitled Southern Culture on the Skids on local indie label Lloyd Street.

After these releases, the band felt that they lacked direction. This led to Lewis leaving in 1987, soon followed by Land. Miller took over on lead vocals, with Mary Huff joining on bass and vocals. Huff suggested Dave Hartman as new drummer, whom she had played with in another band previously. Both Huff and Hartman were from Roanoke, Virginia. The band explored different styles before deciding on a "swamp rock thing". Eventually the three-piece SCOTS released Too Much Pork for Just One Fork on Moist Records in 1991, with SCOTS' evolving signature sound, and humorous lyrical tales concerning southern US culture, particularly sex and food ('Eight Piece Box'). The rockier, rawer-sounding album For Lovers Only followed in 1992 on Safe House Records, featuring Huff on lead vocals for 'Daddy Was a Preacher But Mama Was a Go-Go Girl'. SCOTS released two EPS in 1993, the half-studio half-live Peckin' Party (Feedbag Records) and Girlfight on Sympathy for the Record Industry. 1994 saw the release of the more country-flavoured album Ditch Diggin', again on Safe House, with cleaner production and slightly shorter, tighter songs. The album also featured covers of the Louvin Brothers ('The Great Atomic Power') and Link Wray ('Jack the Ripper Pts. 1 & 2') which had been part of live shows. In 1994 they began convening and headlining an annual roots-rock music festival entitled Sleazefest, held late summer in Chapel Hill.

SCOTS' increasing popularity created major label interest and they signed to Geffen subsidiary DGC in 1995. The following year saw the first recorded version of 'Camel Walk' appear, on a Mexican wrestling-themed EP entitled Santo Swings! SCOTS' first DGC album, Dirt Track Date featured re-recorded versions of popular songs from previous releases ('Eight Piece Box'; 'Camel Walk'; 'Voodoo Cadillac'; 'Firefly') amongst new material, including 'Soul City'. The album was a critical and commercial success, selling over a quarter-million copies. 'Camel Walk' and 'Red Beans 'n' Reverb' featured on the soundtrack to the 1996 movie Flirting with Disaster, while the band appeared in the 1997 movie I Know What You Did Last Summer, playing 'My Baby's Got The Strangest Ways' in the opening beach party scene. SCOTS added keyboard player Chris 'Cousin Crispy' Bess to the line-up for the 1997 album Plastic Seat Sweat, creating a fuller, richer sound. Plastic Seat Sweat was also well-reviewed but Geffen were disappointed by sales, and they parted ways with SCOTS. Miller later commented that the record recouped its costs, but Geffen wanted 'hits' and offered contract renewal conditional on production of a radio-friendly song within the next 3 months, plus touring with ska-punk bands popular at the time. SCOTS declined.

Without a label, SCOTS toured steadily for a few years. Zombified (1998) was a limited, independent release themed around horror movies from drive-ins and late-night TV. SCOTS' next widely released album appeared in 2000, Liquored Up and Lacquered Down, on TVT Records. The multiple alcohol-themed songs reflected the band's previous two years, said Miller. The deal with TVT was short-lived and it took another four years for the next original SCOTS record to appear. 2002 saw the release of SCOTS’ first live album, at least an ‘official’ release amongst several bootlegs. Live at El Sol, on their own Kudzu Records label, featured 16 tracks recorded at shows in Madrid, Spain in 1997. SCOTS next album, a 2004 release on North Carolina's Yep Roc Records, was entitled Mojo Box and was recorded and produced by Miller at the Kudzu Ranch. Mojo Box featured typical songs about trailer parks (‘Doublewide’), muscle cars (‘’69 El Camino’) and Miller's love of surf rock (‘The Wet Spot’) plus versions of Jody Reynolds’ rockabilly classic ‘Fire of Love’ (featuring Bess on keyboards) and The Creations’ ‘Biff Bang Pow’. A second live release followed in 2006, Doublewide and Live, plus a deluxe edition with an extra three songs. The recording was made in front of an enthusiastic crowd at Local 506 in Chapel Hill. The band then surprised a little with 2007's Countrypolitan Favourites, an album of diverse cover songs which mixed country standards including ‘Oh Lonesome Me’ and ‘Tobacco Road’ with versions of tunes by T-Rex, The Kinks and The Byrds.

Album The Kudzu Ranch, released in 2010 on Kudzu Records (as would all future albums), represented the first original recorded material from SCOTS in six years. But it allayed any thought the band had lost their mojo with tracks like ‘Pig Pickin’’, ‘Bone Dry Dirt’ and ‘My Neighbor Burns Trash’ alongside an imaginative Nirvana/Pink Floyd mashup (‘Come As You Are/’Lucifer Sam’). The previous albums Too Much Pork… and Zombified were re-released in 2011, the latter with 5 bonus tracks, as new, younger fans searched for SCOTS’ earlier recorded material, much of which had either been deleted by now-defunct record labels or lost in the Universal fire. Perhaps to this end, SCOTS re-recorded the songs from 1994 album Ditch Diggin’ in 2013, released as Dig This! (Ditch Diggin’ Vol. 2), with modest variations on the original songs and without the two cover versions. Miller claimed the recording was inspired by having to dig out the Kudzu Ranch's blocked drains.

In their earlier days, SCOTS occasionally performed as their own opening act under the name The Pinecones, playing songs inspired by 1960s country-rock and psychedelia typical of artists like Gram Parsons, The Byrds, The Seeds and The Chocolate Watchband (amongst others). This led to SCOTS’ 2016 album The Electric Pinecones, which mixed original songs in this style (‘Grey Skies’, ‘I Aint Gonna Hang Around’) together with more typical SCOTS songs (‘Swamp Fox’, ‘Rice and Beans’). More than anything, the record exemplified Miller, Huff and Hartman's musicianship and versatility. Following on from the Dig This album, and the demise of DGC Records, SCOTS released Bootlegger’s Choice in 2018, featuring new recordings of 15 songs from DGC albums Dirt Track Date and Plastic Seat Sweat, plus a remastered version of the original ‘Camel Walk’. Continuing in this vein, 2020 saw a re-release of the very rare 2003 Kudzu Records Presents, a collection of six songs focussed on NOLA artists including Jessie Hill and Smiley Lewis. The 2020 version featured four extra tracks including songs by Doug Sahm and Slim Whitman, plus two original instrumentals.

The advent of the COVID pandemic in 2019/20 halted SCOTS touring and performing. The band managed to write and record some songs in a makeshift set-up in Miller's living room, these forming the basis of 2021's At Home with Southern Culture on the Skids album. Stripped-back arrangements of necessarily more intimate songs directly addressed the isolation and frustration caused by the pandemic (‘Call Me’) while ‘Run Baby Run’ was a garage rock stomper. SCOTS eventually returned to the road in late 2021. The 2000 album Liquored Up and Lacquered Down was re-released on Kudzu Records in 2023, with three bonus tracks plus a cover of Doug Sahm's 'Nitty Gritty'.

== Performance style ==
AllMusic said that Southern Culture on the Skids started as a straightforward roots rock group before morphing into "a raucous, tongue-in-cheek party band obsessed with sex and fried chicken in the early '90s". Stomp and Stammer described the band as "Green Acres meets Green Onions". According to the Lexington Herald Leader, "The trio has so persistently masked its obviously schooled swamp-rock gumbo sound with enough onstage trailer-park shtick to make many dismiss — or embrace, depending on your entertainment vantage point — the group as a novelty act. What is really going on is a band with roots-rock chops to spare zeroing on material and performance perspectives that keep its music fun." Charleston Grit says that the band makes "white trash fashion and Southern twang an art form." The band is known for their live shows, which often include throwing fried chicken and banana pudding into the audience, and audience members invited to dance and eat onstage.

The Shepherd Express said that the band's music was classified under "genre labels a country mile long", including rockabilly, R&B and surf. WNRN described the band's style as "Dixie-fried Southern rock". The Newtown Bee described their music as "surfin' southern fried psychobilly". Elmore magazine wrote that the band's musical style encompasses "an eclectic range of Americana including rockabilly, surf rock, country and R&B, with a punk edge and heaps of humor". AllMusic described the band's sound as a "wild, careening brand of rock & roll [...] a quintessentially Southern-fried amalgam of rockabilly, boogie, country, blues, swamp pop, and vintage R&B, plus a liberal dose of California surf guitar, a hint of punk attitude, and the occasional mariachi horns". Stomp and Stammer described the band's music as a mix of country, garage rock, surf, rockabilly and soul. According to the Virginian-Pilot, the band fuses blues, psychobilly and rock and roll.

The band's influences include the Cramps, International Submarine Band, Buck Owens, Merle Haggard, the Byrds, the Seeds and the Chocolate Watchband. Guitarist and vocalist Rick Miller says that the band's music "is a lot like a Southern plate lunch. Every item on the menu has been cooking for a while and has its own flavor. But they all run together when you put 'em on the plate and start to eat."

== Band members ==
=== Current members ===
- Rick Miller (vocals, guitar)
- Dave Hartman (percussion)
- Mary Huff (vocals, bass)

=== Former members ===
- Stan Lewis
- Leslie Land
- Chip Shelby
- Chris Bess
- Tim Barnes
- Michael Kelsh

== Discography ==
=== Albums ===
Year	Title	Label
1985	Southern Culture On The Skids a.k.a. First Album (name on disc itself)	Lloyd Street Records
1991	Too Much Pork For Just One Fork	Moist Records
1992	For Lovers Only	Safe House Records
1994	Ditch Diggin'	Safe House Records
1995	Dirt Track Date	Geffen Records
1997	Plastic Seat Sweat	Geffen Records
2000	Liquored Up and Lacquered Down	TVT Records
2000	Liquored Up and Lacquered Down	Telstar Records
2002	Live At El Sol	Kudzu Records
2004	Mojo Box	Yep Roc Records
2006	Doublewide and Live	Yep Roc Records
2006	Doublewide and Live (Deluxe Edition)	Yep Roc Records
2007	Countrypolitan Favorites	Yep Roc Records
2010	The Kudzu Ranch	Kudzu Records
2011	Zombified (reissue with 5 bonus tracks)	Kudzu Records
2013	Dig This: Ditch Diggin' V.2	Kudzu Records
2016	The Electric Pinecones	Kudzu Records
2018	Bootleggers Choice	Kudzu Records
2020	Kudzu Records Presents	Kudzu Records
2021	At Home With Southern Culture on the Skids	Kudzu Records

=== EPs/singles/demos ===
Year	Title	Label	Other information
1984	Voodoo Beach Party	Lloyd Street Records	EP featuring 4 studio tracks: "Rock-A-Hula Rock", "Swamp", "Voodoo Beach Party", "I Knew A Girl (Who Never Said No)"
1992	Santo! Sings	Zontar Records	EP featuring 4 studio tracks
1993	Peckin' Party	Feedbag Records	EP featuring 3 studio tracks and 3 live tracks
1993	Girlfight	Sympathy for the Record Industry	EP featuring 6 studio tracks
1996	Santo Swings!/Viva del Santo	Estrus Records	EP featuring 6 studio tracks; a fictional Santo tribute soundtrack
1996	Camel Walk	Geffen Records	Australian EP featuring 2 studio tracks and 3 live tracks (released September 24, 1996); the title track is from Dirt Track Date
1998	Zombified	Monkey-Dog Music/Cortex Records	Limited edition Australian tour EP featuring 8 Halloween-inspired tracks; re-released and expanded to a full 13-track CD (yet still considered an EP) in 2011
2009	"Come as you are"/"Lucifer Sam"	Spinout Records	EP on black vinyl featuring Los Side Los Straitjackets w/ "Smells Like Teen Spirit"
2014/2015	"Party At My Trouse"/"Hey Mary"	Yep Roc Records	Limited edition single (2014), and EP (2015) on purple vinyl featuring Fred Schneider

=== Guest appearances ===
Year	Title	Album	Label	Other information
1998	"Werewolf", and "Sinister Purpose" (featuring Zacherly)	Halloween Hootenanny	Zombie-A-Go-Go Records	Compilation of 19 Halloween-inspired tracks by various artists including Southern Culture On The Skids
2013	"Goo Goo Muck", "Que Monstruos Son", "The Loneliest Ghost In Town", "Tingler Blues", "La Marcha De Los Cabarones", and "Demon Death"	Mondo Zombie Boogaloo	Yep Roc Records	Compilation of 15 Halloween-inspired tracks by Southern Culture On The Skids, The Fleshtones, and Los Straitjackets
