= The Clapping Song =

1965 song by Shirley Ellis

"The Clapping Song" is an American song, written by Lincoln Chase, originally arranged by Charles Calello and recorded by Shirley Ellis in 1965.

The single sold over a million copies, and peaked at number eight in the United States and number six in the UK.

== Background ==
The song was released shortly after Ellis had released "The Name Game". "The Clapping Song" incorporates lyrics from the song "Little Rubber Dolly", a 1930s song recorded by the Light Crust Doughboys, and also features instructions for a clapping game.

=== Chart performance ===
| Chart (1965) | Peak position |
|---|---|
| Canada RPM | 10 |
| UK Singles (Official Charts Company) | 6 |
| US Billboard Hot 100 | 8 |
| US Billboard Hot Rhythm & Blues Singles | 16 |

The song and partial lyrics is mentioned in To The Last Ridge by W. H. Downing, a memoir of an Australian soldier in WW1 published in 1920, referring to an incident in 1916, thus implying that it pre-dates the 1930’s reference above. Page 11 of the 2002 reissue by Grub Street.

== Cover versions ==
- Gary Glitter did a cover version of "The Clapping Song" in 1972, on his debut album Glitter.
- Ian Cussick recorded his version which was released as a single in 1981.
- The song returned to the charts when The Belle Stars covered the song in 1982, on their self-titled LP. This version charted at number 11 in the UK, and number 4 in Australia. It was the 33rd biggest selling single in Australia in 1983.
- Pia Zadora's cover of the song entered the US top 40 in 1983, when it peaked at number 36 on the Hot 100.
- Aaron Carter did a cover version of "The Clapping Song" in 2000, on his second album Aaron's Party (Come Get It).
- Icona Pop released a modified cover of this song in 2015 titled "Clap Snap" on their EP Emergency.
- Queen drummer Roger Taylor covered the song on his 2021 album Outsider. He released it as a single on 16 September 2021.

== In media ==
"The Clapping Song" has been featured in the soundtracks of the movies Scratch, Because of Winn-Dixie, Private Life, Stuber, Poms, All Together Now, Ghostbusters: Afterlife, Maestro, Die My Love and How to Make a Killing.

In Flatliners, the song is sung by children on the playground.

On television, it was featured in Round Six of the 2009 season of Dancing With the Stars.
