= Personal life of Whitney Houston =

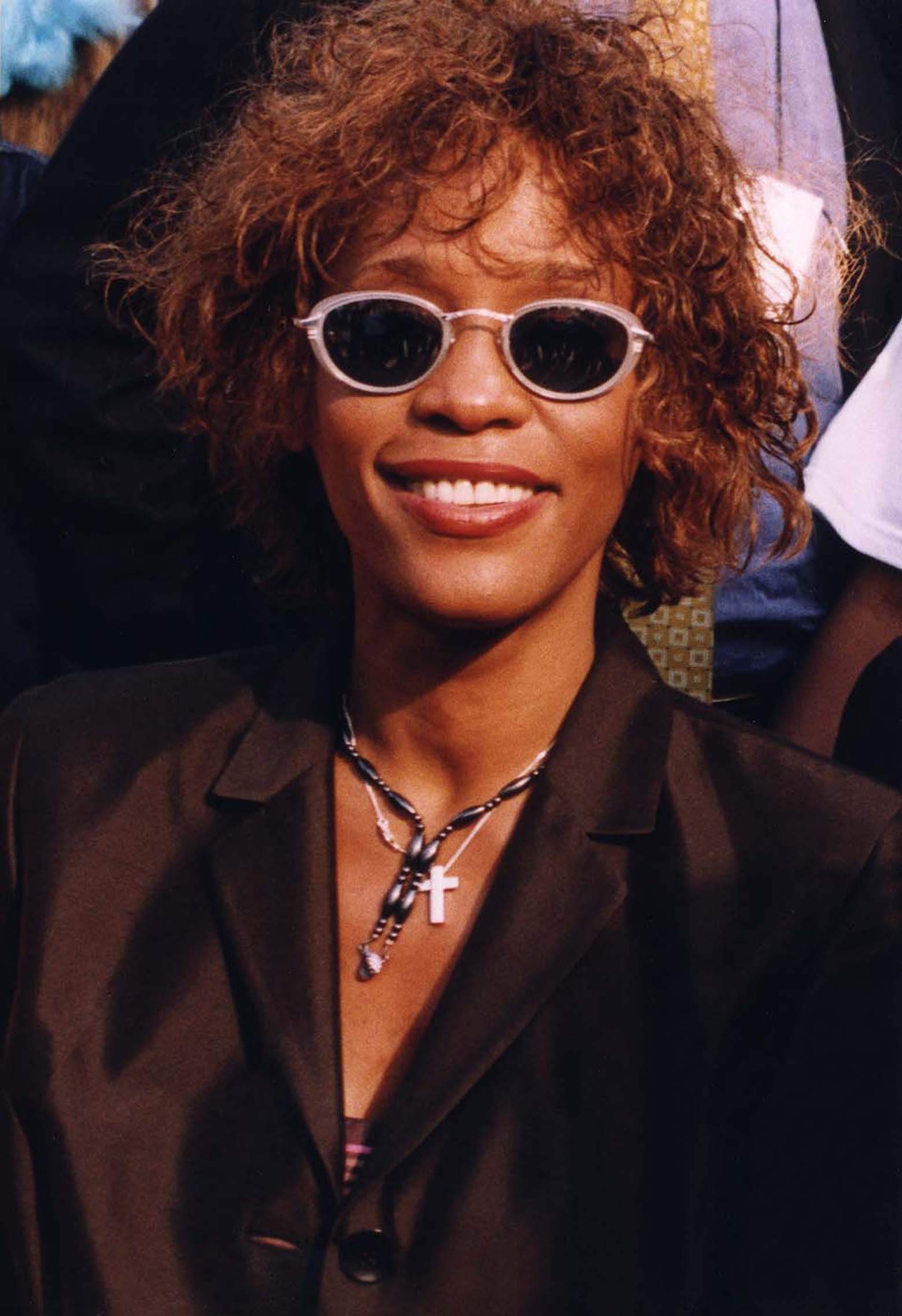
Houston in 2000

Whitney Houston (August 9, 1963 – February 11, 2012) spent much of her life in the public eye throughout her career. Born in Newark, New Jersey and raised in neighboring East Orange, Houston was under the musical tutelage of her mother Cissy Houston at Newark's New Hope Baptist Church where, in her preteens, she began performing solos to prepare herself for show business.

Though raised Baptist, Houston spent much of her schooling at Mount Saint Dominic Academy, an all-girls Catholic school in nearby Caldwell, where she subsequently graduated from in 1981. During this period, Houston engaged in her first sexual relationship with a woman, Robyn Crawford, with whom she met as a fellow counselor of a children's summer camp at East Orange in 1980. The romance ended in February 1982 after Houston told Crawford they couldn't continue the relationship due to the negative attention it might receive as Houston was seeking a recording deal; the two maintained a close platonic relationship, and later a professional partnership for the next two decades.

In 1983, shortly after signing with Arista Records, Houston embarked on a relationship with singer Jermaine Jackson as the two collaborated on several duets together. Because Jackson was married, the relationship was said to have inspired the production and later music video of Houston's first number one hit single, "Saving All My Love for You".

Throughout the 1980s, Houston maintained a very private life, which caught the attention of the tabloid press where they brought up the "unusual closeness" between Houston and Crawford, now a personal assistant, and began speculating that the pair was sexually intimate, which both women steadfastly denied to the press when asked.

Houston's sexuality would become a heavily debated issue during the singer's lifetime and posthumously as well with some of her friends claiming the late singer was at least bisexual.

During the late 1980s, she was involved with New York restaurateur Brad Johnson, who participated in the music video to Houston's 1988 hit, "Where Do Broken Hearts Go". Following their breakup, Houston became romantically involved with American comedian and actor Eddie Murphy and football star Randall Cunningham. Her close friendship with fellow pop superstar Michael Jackson was also examined, with rumors of a possible fling.

Houston then met American singer Bobby Brown at the 1989 Soul Train Music Awards. By the end of 1989, Houston and Brown began forging a close friendship that turned into a romance by 1991. The couple married in 1992 and a year later, in 1993, welcomed their first and only child together, daughter Bobbi Kristina Brown. Throughout their 14-year marriage, Houston and Brown were constantly documented in the press due to domestic disputes, infidelity and rumors of drug use by the pair. In 2005, they participated in the reality TV series, Being Bobby Brown, which was critically maligned but commercially successful. A year later, Houston filed for legal separation from Brown, followed by divorce, which was granted in 2007; Houston never remarried.

The singer had several friendships with notable people such as the Winans family, actor Kevin Costner and singers Aretha Franklin, Mariah Carey and Brandy.

By the 2000s, Houston's battles with substance use started to dominate both tabloid and mainstream media. In 2000, Houston made international headlines when she was detained at a Hawaiian airport for possessing half an ounce of marijuana in her purse. A year later, she appeared rail thin while performing for Michael Jackson, which produced rumors of Houston battling eating disorders.

In 2002, Houston did an interview with Diane Sawyer on Primetime where she admitted to using various substances but denied other rumors such as claims of anorexia and bulimia and of being addicted to crack cocaine. A more combative phone-in interview with Wendy Williams went viral after Houston lambasted Williams for asking her too many private questions. Houston came more forward with her issues in a 2009 interview with Oprah Winfrey, where she admitted to substance abuse and of her ex-husband Brown's domestic abuse.

== Early life, family and faith ==
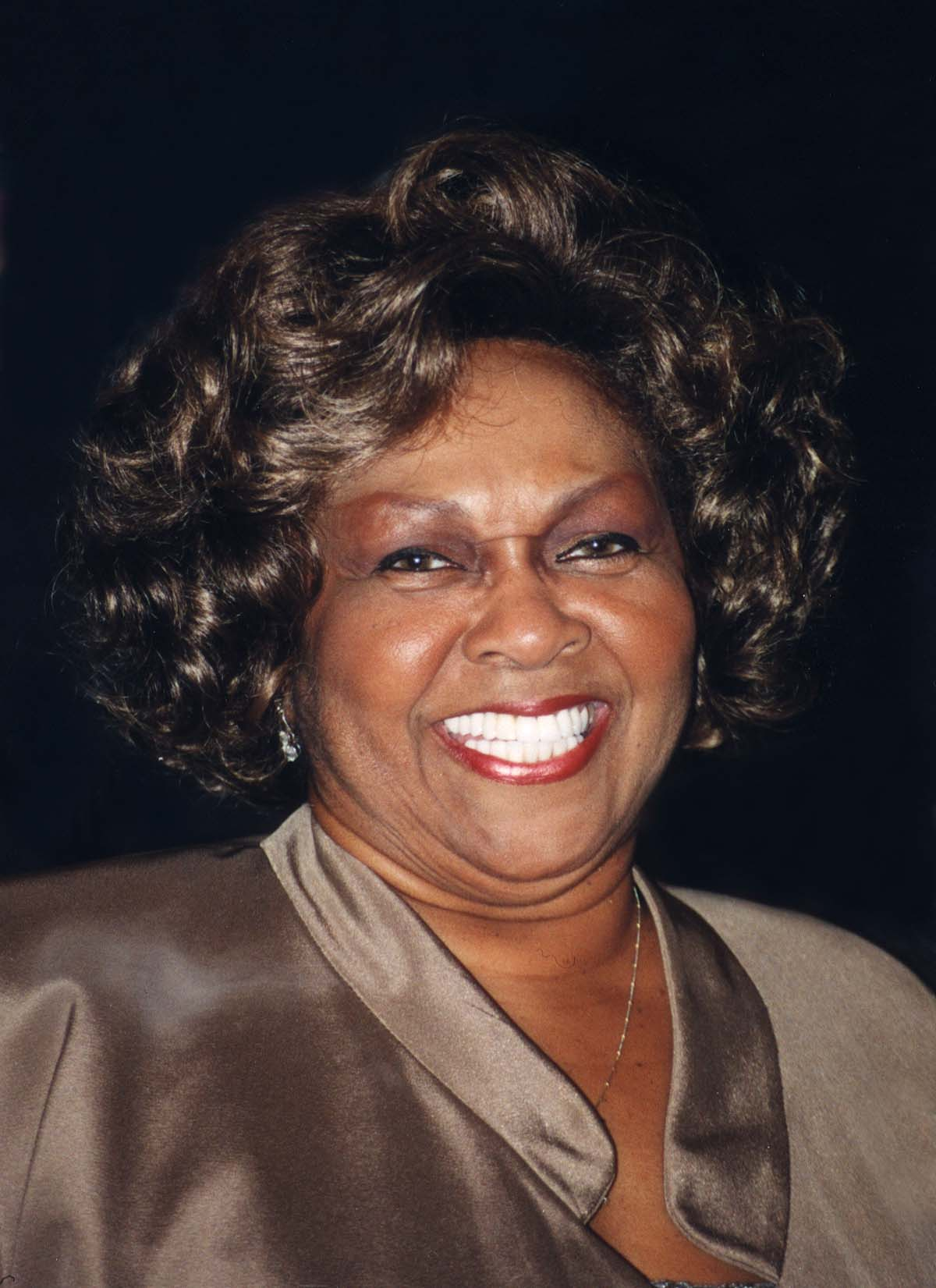
Houston was taught how to sing as a child by her mother Cissy Houston.

Houston was born the youngest child of her parents Emily "Cissy" Drinkard (1933–2024) and John Russell Houston Jr. (1920–2003) at Newark Presbyterian Hospital on August 9, 1963. Through her parents, Houston had an elder brother Michael (b. 1961) while two other brothers, John III (1943-2021) and Gary (b. 1957), were from her parents' previous respective spouses, Elsie Hamilton and Fred Garland.

Gary would later grow up to be a professional basketball player playing briefly with the Denver Nuggets before settling into a career as a singer himself. Houston and her brother Michael were born out-of-wedlock. Following John Houston's divorce from his first wife in the spring of 1964, he and Cissy married prior to Houston's first birthday.

Houston's mother was the founding member of the family gospel group, the Drinkard Singers and the founder of the session vocal group the Sweet Inspirations. Under the latter group, Houston's mother sang background for the likes of Solomon Burke, Wilson Pickett, Aretha Franklin, Dusty Springfield, Van Morrison, Jimi Hendrix, Paul Simon and Elvis Presley, among others. Houston's maternal cousins Dionne and Dee Dee Warwick enjoyed successful careers in pop and soul music while another cousin, Leontyne Price, was a successful opera singer. Darlene Love, another accomplished session vocalist, became Houston's godmother while Franklin became her honorary aunt, with Houston often nicknaming her "Aunt Ree".

Houston's father was a former Army serviceman who later became an administrator under Newark Democratic mayor Kenneth A. Gibson. During his early years dating Houston's mother, he was a taxi driver and began managing Dionne Warwick's singing group, the Gospelaires. After Warwick landed a solo deal with Scepter Records, Cissy replaced her. John would later serve as his wife's manager after Cissy left the Sweet Inspirations in 1969.

According to her mother, Houston was named after actress Whitney Blake. During Houston's early years, her and her family lived at what was then a predominantly black middle-class Newark neighborhood called Wainwright Street.

Houston earned her lifelong nickname, "Nippy", as an infant by her father, citing a comic book character named Nippy Nibbs, who would often get into mischievous activity. As a fussy baby during winter months, she constantly kicked off her blankets at night. Houston's father would then joked, "Nippy — seldom right". Most of her family and friends referred to Houston as "Nippy" (or "Nip") for the rest of her life. Later on in her life, she acquired a lesser known nickname, "Illegal", according to Marvin Winans.

When Houston was three, she accidentally injured herself after a clothes hanger was caught near her throat after Houston was playing with the hanger with her tongue and her brother "gestured wildly and the hanger went back in her mouth" while Houston ripped it off her throat, according to Lester Fabian Braithwaite of Entertainment Weekly. Houston's parents feared she'd lost her voice but doctors were able to patch the wound, telling Houston's parents the hanger came "within an inch" of severing her vocal cords.

Around the same time, Houston and her family witnessed the Newark race riots. The singer later recalled eating her dinner on the floor while the city was being engulfed by protesters, police officers and gunfire. The aftermath of the riots left the Houston family in what was quickly becoming an unsafe environment. Houston's parents were on the road shortly afterwards to bring in much needed income so they could move elsewhere.

A former bodyguard of Houston's, Kevin Ammons, claimed that Houston and her two elder brothers were latchkey kids. However, Houston's mother countered that the children were looked after by close neighbors Ellen White and Phyllis Hardaway throughout this period. White in particular was so close to the family that Cissy nicknamed her "Bae" (short for "baby") while Houston and her siblings called her "Aunt Bae".

In 1970, after her mother signed a lucrative solo recording deal, Houston's family relocated to East Orange (Note: Various sources claimed they moved in 1967, the year of the Newark riots.), settling at what was then a mixed-race, middle-class neighborhood called Dodd Street, which was sometimes referred to as "Doddtown".

During this period, Houston began attending Franklin School. During her third grade year, Houston began to be the target of black female bullies who picked on her for wearing long haired braids, plaid dresses and having a lighter skinned complexion. Houston eventually was forced to fight the bullies by her mother. Houston, who had exhibited a friendly attitude early in childhood, began to be much more isolated as she got older. In 1987, the then 23-year-old singer told Time magazine: "I finally faced the fact that it isn't a crime not having friends. Being alone means you have fewer problems. When I decided to be a singer, my mother warned me I'd be alone a lot. Basically we all are. Loneliness comes with life." Said her cousin Dionne in the same article of Houston and the entire family: "You don't get in unless we let you in." Houston said years later that her mother told her, "Whitney, sometimes you have to be your own best friend. Sometimes you're better off just being by yourself." Houston was considered "shy" by her teenage years; when she went to her senior high school prom in 1981, she had to be "talked into it" since she "wasn't a heavy dater." Houston's date at the senior prom was with a boy named Richie, who was gay.

During this era, Houston began to develop her faith. Her mother was a member and the music minister at Newark's New Hope Baptist Church. Though her father John had been raised Catholic, Houston, like her mother, became a devout Baptist. She recalled to her mother that she became "saved" as a teenager while attending a Pentecostal church nearby and "accepted Jesus into [her] life" and would hold on to her faith during difficult times. Houston would be open about her faith early in her career. In July 1986, the then 22-year-old performer told Ebony magazine, "I believe in God, the Almighty. If you just anchor yourself with God, you can resist a lot of temptations. Prayer helps a lot." When Houston was thirteen, she was transferred from Franklin Elementary to an all-girls Catholic school, Mount Saint Dominic Academy, in nearby Caldwell but felt out of place there due to being one of the very few black students there in the predominantly white school. In 1981, Houston, aged 17, graduated from the school.

During her years in New Hope, Houston was constantly under the tutelage of her mother, having been part of the church's children's choir since the age of five and had also learned how to play the piano there. (Note: Houston sometimes would claim she joined the choir by the age of eight.) By her preteens, Houston was being groomed by her mother to sing solos after she told her mother she wanted to pursue a career in music. In November 1975, at 12 years of age, Houston made her public performance solo debut at New Hope singing the church hymn, "Guide Me O Thou Great Jehovah". (Note: In various interviews, Houston sometimes claimed she was 11 when she first sang solos at the church.) The performance was received well by the congregation. According to the singer, they were "Holy Ghost fired out" from her performance, which further encouraged Houston to pursue a singing career.

=== Alleged child abuse by Dee Dee Warwick ===
In the 2018 documentary film Whitney, directed by Kevin Macdonald, Houston's personal assistant Mary Jones claimed Houston was sexually abused by her cousin, Grammy-nominated soul singer Dee Dee Warwick.

Houston's brother Gary Garland claimed that at times Warwick babysat for him and his siblings growing up as they were being "shuffled with four or five different families". Gary claimed that between the ages of seven and nine, he was abused by a "female relative" without specifically naming Warwick by name. When asked if he believed Houston was also abused by the same relative, he believed so.

Jones claimed that Houston didn't tell her mother "out of fear of the repercussions". "I think she was ashamed," said Jones, adding that the abuse made Houston "question her sexual preference".

Warwick's sister Dionne and Houston's mother Cissy both expressed doubt regarding the truthfulness of the allegations with Houston saying the claims were “unfathomable”.

In a statement, Cissy wrote:

"We cannot, however, overstate the shock and horror we feel and the difficulty we have believing that my niece Dee Dee Warwick (Dionne’s sister) molested two of my three children, I spent many years in recording studios (sometimes with Dionne and/or Dee Dee) where I earned my living. I also went 'on the road' with my group The Sweet Inspirations to try to help provide a good life for my family BUT my children always came first in my heart and in my life.

When I was away they did not stay with four or five different families; they stayed at home where their longtime babysitter, Phyllis, or my dear friend Bae or their father took care of them. In all the years I traveled, Dee Dee, who was 21 years older than Whitney, NEVER BABYSAT for them.

Dee Dee may have had her personal challenges but the idea that she would have molested my children is overwhelming and for us unfathomable. Neither I, Dionne, nor my son Michael who was very close to his sister, and in the film is VERY candid about their drug use, has ever heard these allegations; we have never heard anything remotely connected to the crimes charged against Dee Dee in the film. How can that be fair to my daughter, to Dee Dee, or to our family?

After people have seen the film they will draw their own conclusions and we are not trying to change that. We just want people to know there is another side. While the filmmakers certainly had the legal right to make this film, I wonder at the moral right."

Dionne Warwick called the allegations "totally hogwash" in an interview with Larry King on his talk show Larry King Now. Warwick said: "I have tried to refrain from responding to that. First of all, it’s totally hogwash. My sister would never, ever have done anything to do any harm to any child, especially within our family. And for those lies to be perpetuated in this so-called documentary film [Whitney], I think it’s evil. I will never, and I mean this, ever forgive those who perpetuated this insanity."

Houston’s longtime best friend Robyn Crawford also denied the claims, stating in her 2019 memoirs, "Whitney loved Dee Dee. She was very close to the Warwick family. Both before all of her success — and during. She and I talked a lot about our families. She shared everything with me about her family, as I did mine. If that was true, I would have known about it. She would have told me."

In spite of the allegations, Houston and Warwick remained close throughout the latter's lifetime. Like Houston, Warwick also reportedly struggled with substance abuse. After years of failing health including bouts with rheumatoid arthritis and diabetes, Warwick died at a New Jersey nursing home in 2008, aged 66. At Warwick's funeral attended by Houston, the singer reportedly left her seat to join the choir in singing "The Lord is My Shepherd".

=== Relationship with her parents ===
Houston was close to both of her parents. During her early childhood, Houston's mother Cissy was often away from home in either the recording studio singing background for numerous soul, pop and rock artists, performing onstage in the Chitlin' Circuit with her vocal group the Sweet Inspirations or conducting choirs at New Hope Baptist Church.

Her father John would take care of Houston and her elder brothers by washing, clothing and feeding them. It was through John that Houston earned her nickname "Nippy" after she would playfully remove her winter blankets running around. Starting at the age of four, Houston was being accompanied to Atlantic Recording Studios by her mother Cissy, where Houston witnessed her mother singing background, usually for Aretha Franklin, who was a family friend. Houston would also be introduced to other Atlantic artists such as Wilson Pickett and Patti LaBelle.

Houston's parents' marriage was initially a happy one until the late-1970s when Houston's father suffered a near-fatal heart attack in September 1976. Afterwards the marriage turned volatile as her parents constantly argued. In the 2018 documentary, Whitney, it was revealed that Houston was further devastated when she learned her mother was reportedly having an affair with a minister at New Hope. The arguments affected Houston to the point that, according to her mother, her behavior "started to change". The youngster reacted to her parents' volatile arguments by sometimes staying far away from home and being "rebellious". Houston recalled in 1998:

"I started hangin' out. In the streets walkin', hangin', getting to know another 'family', I suppose the world, the music. I was hangin' around a lotta musicians. Singers, background singers, hangin' out in New York. I didn't wanna be at home. My mother and father were arguing, there was just panic in my household, just unbearable at times. I just wanted peace. As a young girl, I partied, I did my thing. I failed four classes [at Mount Saint Dominic] because I didn't wanna be there. I was just being rebellious, I suppose. But I was hurting, as my brothers were."

By 1982, the Houstons had legally separated. During Houston's early years of stardom, that fact was kept hidden from the public.

Houston and her mother Cissy grew closer during this period due to Houston now embarking on a career in music though mother and daughter occasionally had disagreements.

Both Houston's parents remained active in their daughter's career as she began recording for Arista Records. Cissy accompanied her then 19-year-old daughter to the Merv Griffin Show in June 1983. Cissy sang background on Houston's international number one hit "How Will I Know". The two collaborated on a remake of "I Know Him So Well" from the Chess musical, which was featured on Houston's 1987 album, Whitney. Houston featured her mother in the music video to "Greatest Love of All" in 1986 and in her 1996 film, The Preacher's Wife.

In 1986, Houston formed Nippy Inc., a production and management company and put her father John in charge of the company. By 1989, John Houston had replaced Gene Harvey as his daughter's manager. During his years managing Houston, John admittedly was an "intense manager". John Houston told Ebony magazine in 1990, "I come across to some people as the devil incarnate. I am smart, I learn fast and I'm dedicated to Whitney Houston. It is her career, her money and nobody makes decisions but her."

Shortly after the release of their daughter's iconic recording of "The Star Spangled Banner", John and Cissy officially divorced in 1991 after 27 years of marriage. (Note: Some sources claimed 1990.) Houston did not take the divorce well. In 1992, just as she was preparing her wedding to Bobby Brown, her father quietly remarried to his girlfriend Barbara, with whom he'd remain married to until his death. In 1992, John walked his daughter down the aisle for her wedding to Brown.

An aging John Houston quietly retired from his daughter's management around 2002 and subsequently quit working for Nippy Inc. due to issues with diabetes and heart disease and was subsequently replaced by Houston's sister-in-law, Pat Houston. In 1998, Houston wrote the foreword of her mother's first autobiography, How Sweet the Sound: My Life with God and Gospel.

In August 2001, Houston's father, through his John Houston Enterprises company, run by his partner and company president Kevin Skinner, negotiated a $100 million contract with Arista, which became one of the most lucrative recording deals in history. A year later, in August 2002, the company sued Houston for $100 million for breach of contract, stating the artist owed him and his business partners for services rendered, including negotiating a massive record deal and managing her legal issues. At the time of the lawsuit, John Houston was dying from his illnesses.

Houston stated in 2009 that though the lawsuit broke her heart, she forgave her father and the two mended their broken relationship prior to John's death in February 2003. The singer told Oprah Winfrey: "I love my dad, and I knew he was sickly. People were trying to get money from him. Distract me from him."

According to Houston, she and her father didn’t speak for awhile, but when he became ill, she went to visit him at the hospital and said, "Let’s end this right now ... You're my father, and I love you, and I'm going to be here until the end." Houston told Oprah that she and her family had a private memorial, so they could grieve John away from the spotlight.

Cissy Houston later got involved in sending her daughter to rehabilitation centers to get her clean and sober after years of substance abuse; Houston subsequently would attend these centers off and on up until her death. Cissy was the last person to speak to Houston on the day of her death in 2012; Cissy recalled her daughter "seemed to be fine".

== Early relationships ==
=== Robyn Crawford ===
"I was 16 and we were working at summer jobs and I remember thinking, 'Wow, this is really going to be a trip this summer — I don't have any friends'. And then here comes Robyn with this beautiful, beautiful afro. She was tall and very statuesque and I was like, 'Wow, man.' She stood up for me. I remember thinking, I've known this person seems like all my life." - Whitney Houston on first meeting Robyn Crawford.

In August 1980, Houston first met Robyn Crawford at the East Orange Community Development Center; the two had found work as summer camp counselors. Houston was several days shy of her 17th birthday and Crawford was four months shy of her 20th birthday when they met. The two instantly bonded, according to Crawford, who during their first meeting told her "I'm gonna look out for you". Later on, Houston told her "stick with me and I'll take you around the world."

At the time of the start of their relationship, Houston was a junior at Mount Saint Dominic Academy while Crawford was a collegiate basketball player who was then attending Monmouth University on a basketball scholarship.

During this period, Houston's parents were separated and Houston had only a few friends to talk to. As a result, the shy schoolgirl instantly grew close to Crawford, later telling people that she was "the sister I never had". As they got acquainted, according to Crawford, the young women's relationship grabbed the attention of residents of their East Orange neighborhood and the pair would occasionally encounter homophobic reactions. Crawford and Houston shared their first kiss weeks later at Houston's Doddtown residence.

Following a performance at New Hope Baptist Church one Sunday, Houston and Crawford spent time at a mutual friend's apartment where, after eating fast food and reading the Bible while smoking marijuana together, they first became passionate towards each other, starting what would be a two-year romance. During this era, Houston and Crawford began venturing gay clubs together at Asbury Park and did little to hide their affair. At one point, after leaving a gay club, they removed their clothes and made love in Houston's cousin Dee Dee's Cadillac and were told by a cop to move out of the section after they were spotted.

Though Cissy Houston later claimed she wasn't sure if her daughter was romantically involved with Crawford, she didn't approve of their close relationship. At one point, according to Crawford, Cissy recited a Biblical verse to her daughter and told her it "wasn't natural for two women to be that close"; Houston ignored her mother's advice.

In February 1982, Houston came to the apartment Crawford shared with her mother and gave her a gift which included a "slate-blue Bible" inside, telling them they have to stop their romantic affair.

Said Crawford: "she said 'we shouldn't be physical anymore because it would make our journey more difficult.' She said 'if people find out about us, they would use this against us.' And back in the '80s, that's how it felt."

Shortly afterwards, the pair moved together to a two-bedroom apartment at Woodbridge Township, New Jersey and continued their platonic relationship.

Starting around that fall, just as Houston's recording career was picking up steam, Crawford dropped out of Monmouth University to follow and aid Houston's career, much to the chagrin of her mother.

Crawford became Houston's personal assistant following the release of the singer's debut album in February 1985. Eventually, Crawford moved up to being Houston's executive assistant after she formed her production company Nippy Inc., and, finally, creative director.

Crawford was featured as a background singer in the music video for Houston's hit single "You Give Good Love", which became Houston's first number one hit on the R&B charts.

Rumors of their intimate relationship began hitting the press after Houston wanted to fly Crawford to join her at a black radio convention in 1985, which caught the attention of radio disk jockeys and tabloid newspapers alike.

Houston and Crawford often shared the same hotel room and when Houston moved to bigger residences, Crawford accompanied her. As Houston's fame grew, her father advised the pair to stay apart from each other during public appearances and date men to avoid suspicion.

Author Gerrick Kennedy later wrote in 2022, "The public concluded [in the 1980s] that Whitney was a closet lesbian and she and Robyn were star-crossed lovers doomed by the oppression of society and Whitney’s religious family."

During a 1987 interview with Time magazine, both Houston and Crawford denied reports of being engaged in a relationship. Crawford told the publication, "I tell my family, 'You can hear anything on the streets, but if you don't hear it from me, it's not true'." Houston added: "My mother taught me that when you stand in the truth and someone tells a lie about you, don't fight it. I'm not with any man. I'm not in love. People see Robyn with me, and they draw their own conclusions. Anyway, whose business is it if you're gay or like dogs? What others do shouldn't matter. Let people talk. It doesn't bother me because I know I'm not gay. I don't care." Houston would continue to deny the reports for most of her career.

When Houston married singer Bobby Brown in 1992, she made Crawford the maid of honor. Crawford would claim Houston became isolated following her marriage to Brown, leading to a gradual estrangement in Houston and Crawford's friendship. Crawford, who had been living in Houston's Mendham residence prior to the marriage, relocated to a house five blocks away, paid for by the singer. Crawford left Houston's employ in May 2000. Crawford and Houston last physically saw each other following the taping of the VH1 Divas Duets in May 2003. Crawford shared an open letter about Houston following the latter's death in 2012 and attended her memorial service. In 2019, Crawford released her memoirs discussing her 20-year friendship with Houston titled A Song for You: My Life with Whitney Houston, which became a New York Times best-seller.

=== Jermaine Jackson ===
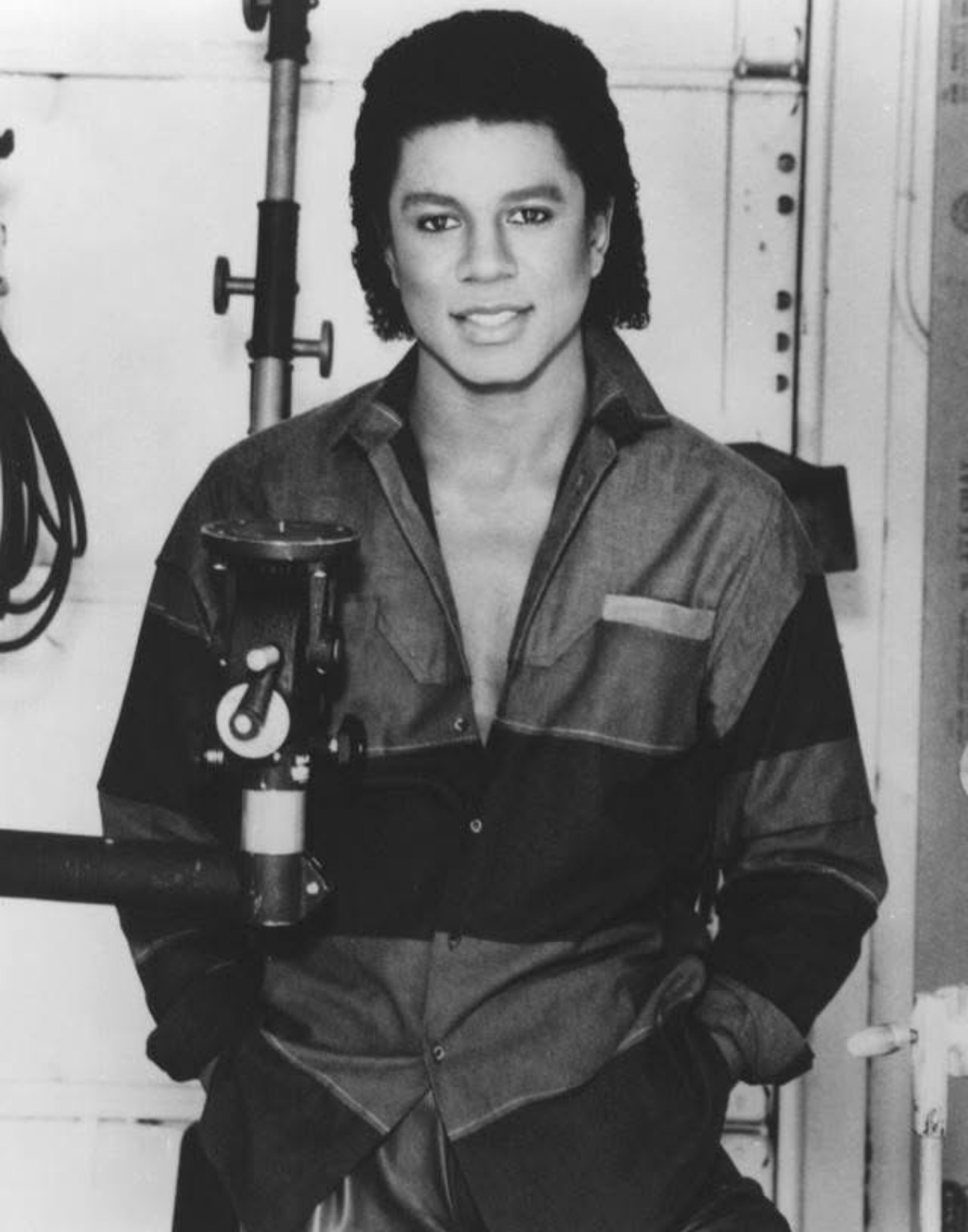
Houston's relationship with Jermaine Jackson inspired the recording and music video of "Saving All My Love for You".

Following Houston signing with Arista Records in 1983, Jermaine Jackson was one of the first to produce for Houston's debut album and his own album, Jermaine Jackson. During this period, Houston and Jackson reportedly engaged in a yearlong clandestine affair despite the fact that Jackson, who was nine years Houston's senior, was still married to then-wife Hazel Gordy, daughter of Motown founder Berry Gordy.

According to Robyn Crawford, Jackson was "smuggled into hotel rooms" with Houston, worked late nights on duets with her and the 20-year-old Houston even had a nickname for Jackson, "Ji".

The affair reportedly alarmed Jackson's brother Michael, who warned him that the affair could destroy both his and Houston's careers. Houston and Jackson appeared on TV together performing on the soap opera, As the World Turns. According to Robyn Crawford, the affair broke when Houston was angered that Jackson had reneged on a promise to give Houston and Crawford tickets to see the Jacksons's Victory Tour at Madison Square Garden around July 1984, which led to Houston going off on vacation by herself and refusing to give Jackson her phone number. Others reported that Houston angrily broke off the affair because Jackson wouldn't leave his wife Hazel.

The relationship and the subsequent breakup reportedly inspired the recording and music video of Houston's rendition of "Saving All My Love for You", which became Houston's first US number-one hit in 1985. While Houston initially denied the song had anything to do with her personal life, in 1999, the singer admitted she recorded the song from experience of being with a married man though she never named Jackson, stating "I was going through a terrible love affair. He was married, and that will never work out for anybody. Never."

Jermaine Jackson later stated of their relationship while making music with the young singer: "These were turning into duets between temptation and forbidden love [...] I arrived on those days with butterflies, because the whole experience of being around Whitney was intoxicating [...] it became increasingly hard to sing love songs with all that emotion and unspoken passion between us." Houston and Jackson maintained a friendship that lasted until Houston's death in 2012. Following the death of Jackson's brother Michael, Houston reportedly consoled the musician; subsequently following Houston's own death three years later, Jackson was reportedly "too distraught" to attend her funeral.

=== Eddie Murphy ===
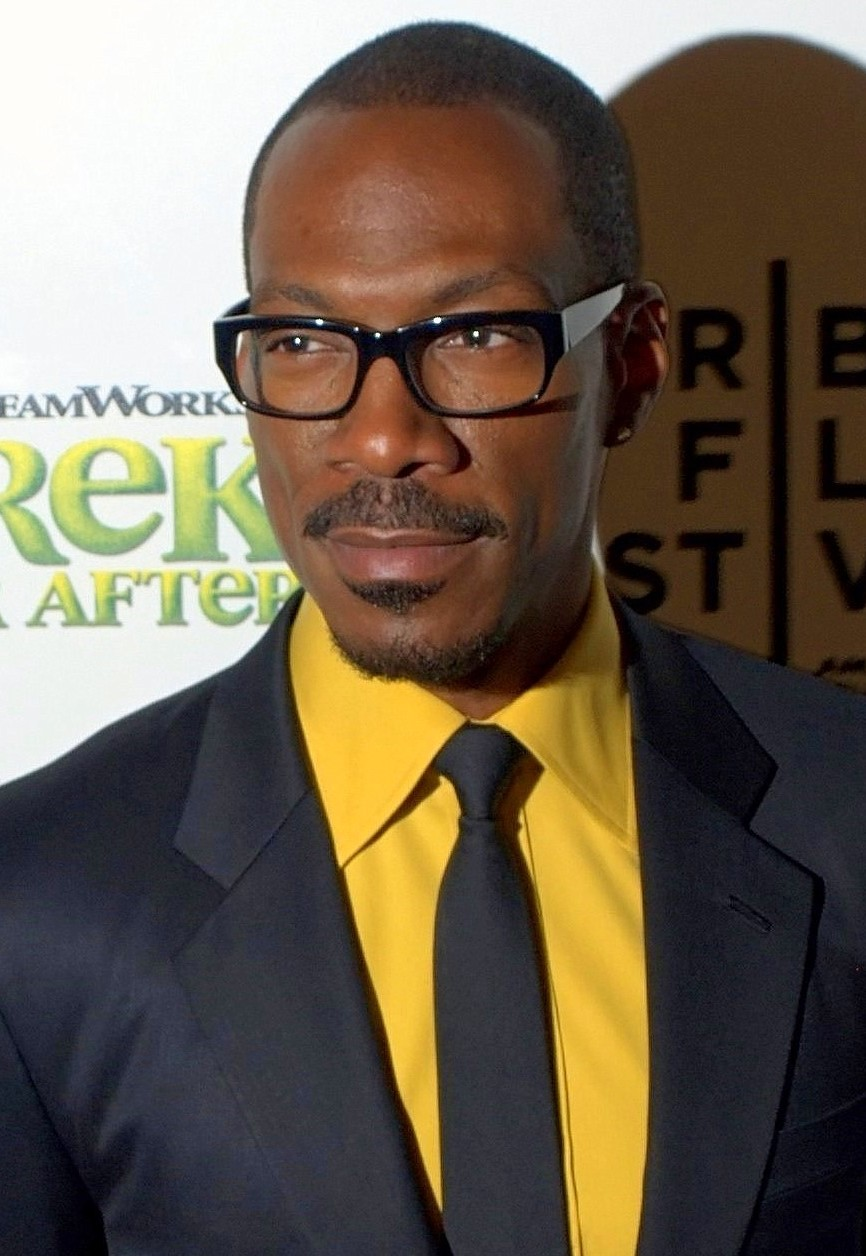
Houston's relationship with Eddie Murphy was "elusive".

Houston first met comedian-actor Eddie Murphy in 1985, being introduced to one another by Keenen Ivory Wayans. Around 1988, Houston and Murphy reportedly began getting romantically involved. Houston was "infatuated" with Murphy and, according to longtime friend Ellen White, was "so enamored" with the actor that she watched his film, Coming to America, "more than once", stating the two "shared something special". "I watched them once at a party," White recalled. "Eddie came in, cameras were flashing and they just looked at each other and talked and laughed like they were the only two people in the room." Murphy was described by some friends of Houston as "elusive". At one point during the affair, Houston had invited Murphy to her house in Mendham, New Jersey where she prepared dinner for him only for Murphy to never show up which, according to Robyn Crawford "devastated" Houston. On another attempt to woo Murphy, Houston showed up at the gate of his house before his birthday to surprise him, only to be told the comedian was "busy".

Crawford claimed later that Houston "lost herself" in her pursuit of the actor. Eventually by late 1989, Houston decided to end the "elusive" affair. According to Houston's longtime producer Narada Michael Walden, who also was friends with Murphy, Houston was deeply affected by the Murphy relationship after noticing Houston being unusually "quiet and workmanlike" while working on the song "Feels So Good" during sessions of the I'm Your Baby Tonight album. As Walden replayed "Feels So Good", he received a phone call from his guru who told him "please watch out for Whitney Houston", sensing the singer was "very troubled, very depressed, almost close to death", which alarmed Walden." When Houston returned to the recording studio the next day, Walden asked her if something was bothering her, to which Houston opened up to him about the breakup with Murphy and accused the comic of "leading her on" throughout the ill-fated yearlong affair. Walden concluded the affair with Murphy "worn her out".

On the day Houston was scheduled to marry singer Bobby Brown in 1992, Murphy called Houston and warned her that she was "making a mistake" by marrying Brown, to which Houston ignored him and subsequently hung up on him and, according to Crawford, "press ahead" with the Brown wedding. Though Murphy has constantly denied an affair with Houston, insisting the two were just friends, many associates of Houston's confirmed their affair.

=== Other relationships ===
In between her affairs with Jackson and Murphy, Houston was reportedly involved with Manhattan restaurateur Brad Johnson around 1987. Johnson was reportedly 30 when he and Houston met while she visited Johnson's restaurant. According to Johnson, he and the then 24-year-old superstar "immediately clicked and began hanging out". Johnson was referred to as Houston's "first proper boyfriend". In 2018, while being interviewed for the Houston documentary, Whitney, Johnson described Houston as "just sweet, somewhat shy – – I hesitate to say 'innocent' because she had such an old soul. She was wise in a way, but then she was still this 23-year-old girl." Johnson later appeared in the music video for her 1988 hit, "Where Do Broken Hearts Go". Though Houston and Johnson later broke up, Johnson claimed the breakup was amicable, with neither side saying anything bad about the other. Johnson also reflected on Robyn Crawford's role in Houston's life, saying "I have on several occasions rode in a limousine holding Whitney’s hand with Robyn sitting across from us. She was protective, but I never felt any animosity towards me."

Houston's other prolific relationship was with American football star Randall Cunningham of the Philadelphia Eagles. The two were first linked around 1985 in an attempt by Houston's parents and management to curb rumors of Houston's sexuality at the time. Rumors emerged that Houston's 1987 hit, "Didn't We Almost Have It All" was inspired by their early relationship. Following her split from Eddie Murphy and her early friendship with singer Bobby Brown, Houston invited Cunningham with her to the listening party for her album, I'm Your Baby Tonight (1990). Cunningham constantly courted Houston during their on-again, off-again relationship but Cunningham's teammates claimed the athlete's pursuit of Houston was "the wrong way", with his Eagles teammate Garry Cobb adding that Cunningham was "a goody-goody two-shoes type of guy" and that Houston "liked the bad boy type". It was later revealed that Cunningham skipped an Eagles pre-season game to party with Houston.

Though they never dated, it was reported that rap star MC Hammer was personally asked by Houston's father John during Super Bowl XXV when Houston performed her rendition of "The Star-Spangled Banner" in January 1991 to marry Houston. The Grammy-winning rapper was already a married man with two children when he was approached.

Despite the marriage offer, Houston and Hammer maintained a personal friendship that lasted until Houston's death.

== Michael Jackson ==
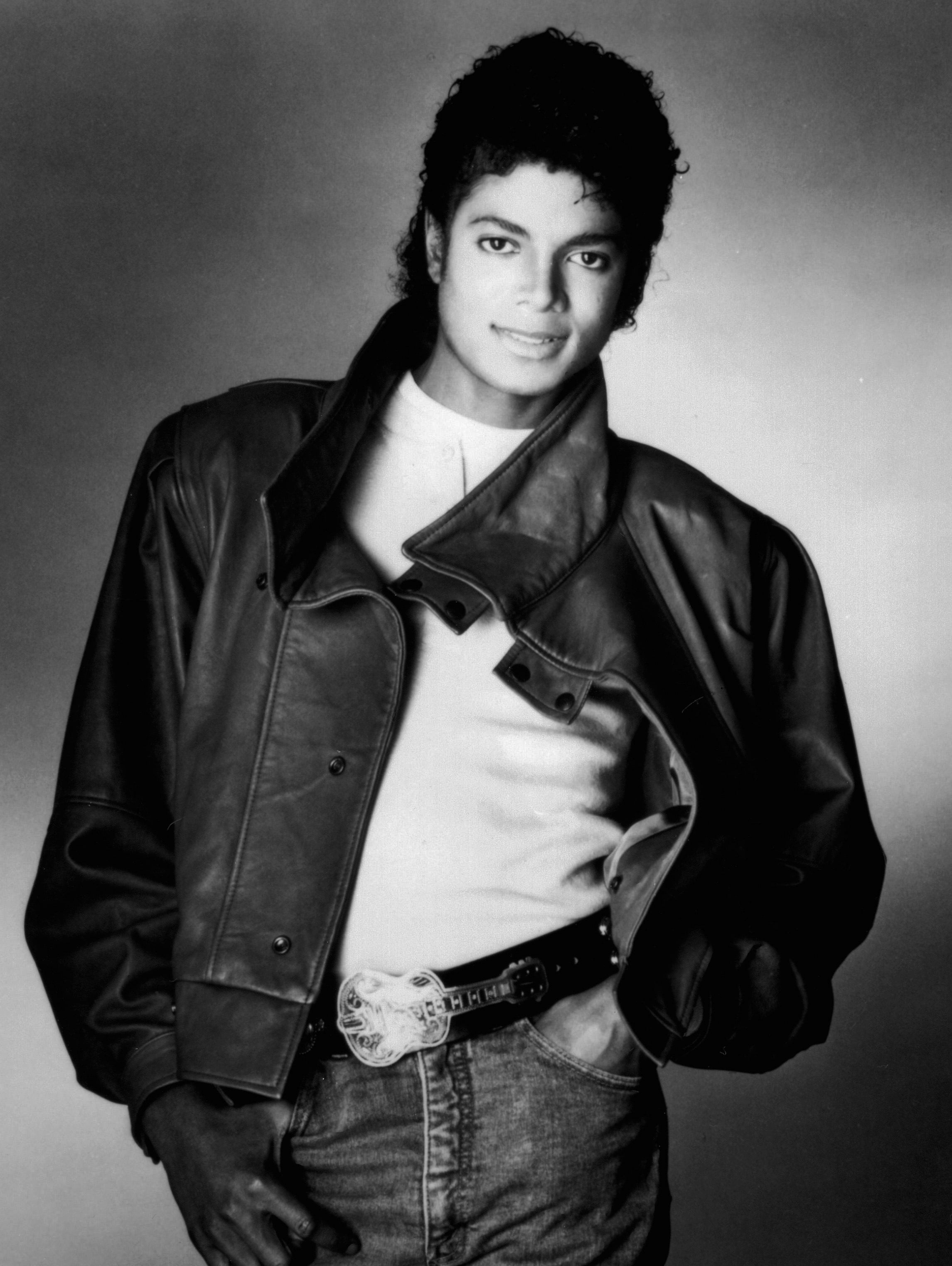
Houston enjoyed a close friendship with Michael Jackson.

Houston also shared a close friendship with fellow pop superstar Michael Jackson. Houston and Jackson first met backstage prior to the 30th Grammy Awards in 1988 where the two artists were rehearsing to perform on the show. Houston later visited Jackson's Neverland Ranch in 1989 where she was there to present Jackson with several trophies from the World Music Video Awards.

Jackson's British bodyguard Matt Fiddes later claimed to the tabloid magazine, The Sun, that the two singers began a brief romantic affair in 1991. Said Fiddes: "They met because they were two of the biggest recording artists on the planet and mixing in the same circles. They instantly connected as kindred spirits because they understood each other’s massive fame." Fiddes claimed Houston "practically moved in" to the ranch, claiming it lasted just two weeks. Fiddes claimed Jackson wished it "would have went further" and that the singer "never got over his love for Houston" and even dreamed of marrying the singer. Bobby Brown later claimed in his memoirs that Jackson called him on the phone after Brown and Houston married, telling Brown that he should've been the one to marry Houston and that Brown "beat him to it".

According to others, Houston and Jackson shared a "special kinship" with one another as both artists became worldwide megastars. According to Soraya Nadia McDonald of Andscape, the kinship "went far deeper than your usual show business fare, in which a couple of Big Names have a conversation over one drink at a party and suddenly and conveniently they’re best friends. No, Whitney and Michael shared a similar, familiar, specific isolation — one that allowed the two of them to visit with each other and simply sit in silent communion, each wordlessly in tune with what the other was experiencing.

McDonald continued, "the two biggest black pop stars of the ’80s were each in possession of generation-defining voices that carried far beyond the time limits typically expected of such acts. They could be charming scene-stealers, the type who just naturally drew a spotlight regardless of whether they meant to. But together, in casual privacy, they were just two people aware of what they’d relinquished to become mononyms, to float above the country that birthed them, a couple of Icaruses doomed by their parents’ hubris and their country’s hatred."

Houston and Jackson came close to working together musically on at least two duets. In 1987, Jackson presented his love ballad "I Just Can't Stop Loving You" to Clive Davis for Houston to record, though Davis eventually turned Jackson down, fearing the duet may come in direct interference of promotion on Houston's album, Whitney. In 1998, Houston asked Jackson to contribute in singing on her song, "If I Told You That", though Jackson eventually turned it down. Though recorded as a solo track, British musician George Michael later contributed vocals to the duet version on Houston's compilation, Whitney: The Greatest Hits, formally replacing Jackson.

During preparation for Jackson's 30th anniversary concerts at Madison Square Garden, Jackson invited Houston to participate in the concerts and initially planned to do a duet version of Jackson's 1975 Motown ballad, "One Day in Your Life", which they rehearsed until they decided to scrap the duet. It was then decided that Houston would open the show singing Jackson's 1982 hit, "Wanna Be Startin' Somethin'".

Houston also openly defended Jackson when he was accused of child sexual abuse in the 1990s and was one of the few celebrities to keep in touch with Jackson during his 2005 trial. When asked how difficult his death in 2009 was during her interview with Oprah Winfrey, an emotional and teary-eyed Houston told Winfrey that she was "devastated... I thought 'it can't be true. It can't be true.'" Houston dedicated her rendition of "A Song for You" during the concerts from her 2009-10 Nothing but Love World Tour to Jackson and often showed a symbol of the late singer during the performances.

== Bobby Brown ==
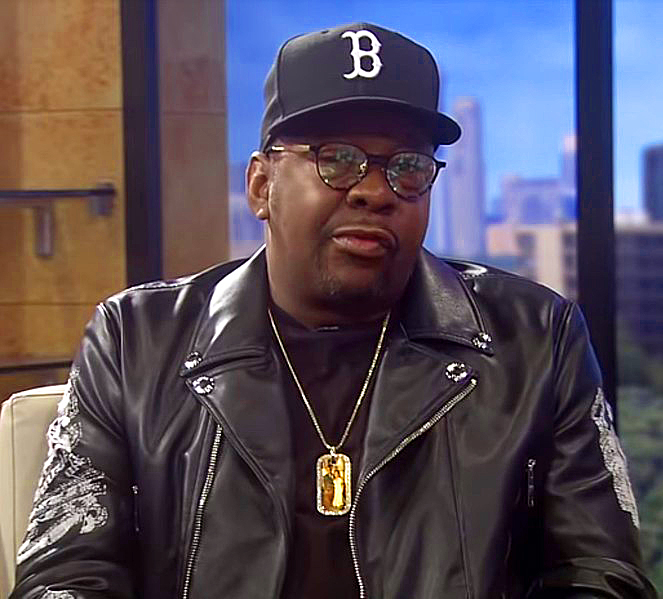
Houston's marriage to Bobby Brown was reportedly volatile.

=== First meeting and courtship ===
Houston first met American singer Bobby Brown at the 3rd Annual Soul Train Music Awards on April 13, 1989. Their friendship took shape after Houston invited the then 20-year-old former New Edition founder to her 26th birthday party at her mansion in Mendham to which Brown agreed and attended on August 12 of that year, three days after Houston's actual birthday. Roughly four months later, in December 1989, while attending a party in honor of CeCe Winans, Brown approached Houston on taking her out on a date to which Houston accepted.

Brown later stated their first date was to go view the film, Uncle Buck, in movie theaters. In 2022, Brown recalled in his A&E documentary that he and Houston "went shopping in Beverly Hills, we had dinner at the Ivy and then we just chilled for the rest of the evening. Just the way she looked at me from day one until the last day we were together was always special." Said Houston in 1993, "Our whole relationship started out as friends. We'd have dinner, laugh, talk and go home. It wasn't intimate. And then it kind of dawned on us, 'What's going on here?'."

According to Narada Michael Walden, when Houston entered the recording studio to record "All the Man That I Need" in December 1989, he mentioned that Houston, who had been "under a fog" following her breakup with Eddie Murphy, had broken out of that fog during the sessions for "All the Man That I Need", which Walden later credited to the presence of Brown.

Houston said of Brown in 1993, "He was the first male I met in the business that I could talk to and be real with. He was so down and so cool, I was like 'I like him.'" Houston told Diane Sawyer in 2002 that Brown "was sexy, smooth, a gentleman and a nice guy contrary to popular belief. Treated me like a lady. We're opposites in so many ways, but we're much alike."

=== Proposal and wedding ===
Despite the musicians' relationships with others — Houston with Eddie Murphy (and later Randall Cunningham) and Brown with childhood sweetheart Kim Ward, their own relationship grew serious by late 1990 and that year, Brown first proposed marriage, to which Houston turned down. In 1993, Houston explained to Rolling Stone: "The first time he asked me to marry him, I said [laughs]: 'Forget about it, no way. It’s just not in my plans.'"

In 1991, however, Houston changed her mind and by her own admittance had fallen in love with Brown. After the 22-year-old Brown proposed marriage to 28-year-old Houston in Germany, the singer accepted. That year, Brown accompanied Houston when she embarked on her I'm Your Baby Tonight World Tour; the following year, Houston did the same when she accompanied Brown on his "Humpin' Around the World Tour" and occasionally joined him onstage.

Prior to the proposal, Houston told Vanity Fair in November 1992, "I just never wanted to be married. I had an independence that didn't include marriage. I always thought men were full of shit. For the most part, they used to talk shit to me all the time."

During the engagement, Houston learned that Brown had impregnated Kim Ward, but decided to continue the engagement. Ward was three months pregnant with their son Bobby Jr. when she learned Brown was engaged to Houston, leading to the end of their on-again, off-again relationship of eleven years.

Robyn Crawford later claimed that on their way to make a visit to Brown's dressing room during one of his concerts, she and Houston caught Brown and Ward exchanged in a heated argument that led to a physical confrontation broken up by Brown's elder brother Tommy, leading the pair stunned. Ward then turned to Houston and told her, "I don't care if you are Whitney Houston. If he would do this to me, he'll do it to you", before leaving.

Houston and Brown married on July 18, 1992. The wedding took place on the birthday of South African civil rights activist Nelson Mandela's 74th birthday. The wedding was held at Houston's Mendham mansion and was attended by 800 friends, family and celebrities, including Dionne Warwick, Patti LaBelle, Gladys Knight, Jasmine Guy, Brown's New Edition band mates Ralph Tresvant, Johnny Gill and Michael Bivins, Narada Michael Walden and Donald Trump among others. Both bride and groom wore white at the wedding while the groomsmen and bridesmaids wore purple suits and dresses respectively; Houston's choice. The wedding was presided by Marvin Winans of the Winans gospel family group. Lynn Norment documented the wedding on the September 1992 issue of Ebony magazine with the headline "The Wedding of the Decade".

=== First pregnancy and miscarriage ===
During the final months of the I'm Your Baby Tonight World Tour in 1991, Houston learned she was pregnant with Brown's child. The singer was six months pregnant when she began working on her first film, The Bodyguard, and later miscarried the child around January 1992.

Bobby Brown claimed later in his 2016 memoirs that he believed Houston faked the miscarriage, claiming he didn't see any signs of Houston being pregnant at the time, later leading to an argument between the singers with Houston insisting she was pregnant.

Brown further indicated that Houston faked both the pregnancy and the miscarriage to counter the media's negative criticism of the couple's relationship.

Cissy Houston, on the other hand, confirmed that Houston had miscarried her child after she and Houston's father John came to her rented home in Miami to console the singer.

=== Birth of Bobbi Kristina Brown ===
Houston learned in August 1992 that she was a month pregnant with Brown's child. As Houston's record label prepared the release of her soundtrack to The Bodyguard, Houston cooled on promoting the soundtrack, only participating in two music videos — one for "I Will Always Love You" and another for "I'm Every Woman"; in the latter video, Houston was visibly pregnant and proudly showed off her pregnant belly at the very end of the video.

On March 4, 1993, Houston gave birth to her first and only child, Bobbi Kristina Brown, at St. Barnabas Medical Center in Livingston, New Jersey. During this period, Houston and Brown collaborated on the hit duet, "Something in Common", and shot the music video for the song in Atlanta, Georgia, near where Brown resided. At the end of the video, the couple showed their newborn daughter to the camera. Following her daughter's birth, Houston laid low at her Mendham residence for four months before preparing for rehearsals for the world tour supporting her soundtrack to The Bodyguard.

=== Married life and difficulties ===
Houston and Brown split time between Houston's Mendham residence in New Jersey and Brown's residence just outside Atlanta, Georgia during the early years of their marriage. Brown and Houston continued to try having more children but Houston would suffer from more miscarriages, having one in July 1994 and another in December 1996. Houston became the stepmother to three of Brown's elder children from previous relationships.

From the time they became public with their relationship in early 1992, many in the media perceived them to be the "Odd Couple" due to their supposed differences with Houston being perceived as a religiously devout middle class suburban "princess" and Brown perceived as a controversial "bad boy" from the projects; later when Michael Jackson married Lisa Marie Presley, the two couples were often compared.

When they announced their plans to marry, some predicted their marriage would be one out of convenience rather than actual love. They felt Brown only agreed to marry Houston "for her money" and to clean up his reputed bad-boy image while claiming Houston agreeing to marry to end debate on her sexuality and her black identity.

After marrying, one media report stated that they wouldn't be together "longer than six months". Both Houston and Brown defiantly defended their marriage to the press. Their 1992 self-penned duet, "Something in Common", was a top twenty UK hit and US radio hit and was a response against media speculation on their relationship as was Houston's recordings of "In My Business", a gender-swapped rendition of Stevie Wonder's "I Was Made to Love Him" and "Whatchulookinat", the latter of which was produced by Brown.

In September 1992, while promoting his album, Bobby, the 23-year-old singer told the Los Angeles Times, "My wife gives me the freedom to be myself. She's very secure and she knows how much I do love her. It makes me feel better to know I have a strong woman beside me. I didn't think I was ever going to get married until I met Whitney. I think I was with the wrong people to understand what love was about."

On occasion, according to David Collins in his book, Preacher of the Streets, it was reported that Houston once saved her husband from a kidnapping after reputed Harlem gangster Clarence "Preacher" Heatley claimed Brown owed him $25,000 for covering a drug debt. Collins claimed Houston reportedly paid over $400,000 in person and Brown was subsequently let go; Brown to this day denies Collins's allegations.

Besides Jackson and Presley, Houston and Brown were also often compared to notorious couple Bonnie and Clyde throughout their marriage with a family friend stating, "They had this sort of Bonnie and Clyde mentality where it's them against the world." In a February 1993 Vanity Fair profile of the couple, writer Lynn Hirschberg described them as the “inverse of Fred Astaire and Ginger Rogers. Like Ginger, Bobby gives a sexual charge to the pure image of Whitney (Fred), while she graces him with a veneer of class.”

Both Brown and Houston claimed they learned from each other professionally. In his 2016 memoirs, Every Little Step, Brown credited Houston with teaching him how to sing properly, writing, "She taught me how to use my voice, how to blend my notes, how to chop my voice when I needed." Brown wrote that he helped Houston how to dance, further adding: "At first, she was uncomfortable with dancing. Admittedly she didn't have much rhythm. But she had a certain flair. … With the two of us working together, sharing our strengths, I think we made each other better entertainers." Houston later credited Brown for helping to finish work on her first feature film, The Bodyguard and also for helping her to incorporate hip-hop music into her sound, following the release of the My Love Is Your Love album. When Houston won the Grammy Award for Best Female R&B Vocal Performance for "It's Not Right but It's Okay", Houston personally thanked Brown, calling him the "original R&B king". In 1999, the couple earned a Guinness World Record for being the most successful musical star couple due to the singers' combined global pop success.

Houston and Brown's marriage was almost volatile from the start. During their marriage, Brown had several run-ins with the law for drunken driving, drug possession and battery, including some jail time. In October 1995, Entertainment Weekly reported that the 32-year-old Houston had separated from Brown with the singer's publicist admitting the couple were having marital problems and were "working it out in private". They reconciled by the end of the year during the premiere of Houston's film, Waiting to Exhale. Houston's recording of "Why Does It Hurt So Bad" from the soundtrack was reportedly inspired by their troubling marriage. (Note: "Why Does It Hurt So Bad" was originally offered to Houston in 1991 early in their relationship but Houston turned it down at the time due to not being able to relate to the song's lyrics.) In July 1997, Brown was accused of striking Houston in the face after pictures resurfaced of Houston in Capri with a bandage over her cheek covering a two-inch cut to which she received two stitches; the couple denied the reports at the time with Houston claiming she injured her face while stumbling on a rock while Brown steadfastly denied reports he ever hit Houston. Houston's Grammy-winning 1999 hit, "It's Not Right but It's Okay" was reportedly aimed at Brown due to the song's theme of infidelity though Houston denied it.

In December 2003, Brown reportedly struck Houston during an argument at their home in Alpharetta, Georgia, to which Brown had threatened bodily harm to Houston during their altercation before subsequently leaving the premises; Houston called police about the incident and reported it to authorities.

Initially, in 2004, Brown denied hitting Houston and even claiming she was the instigator in that fight, claiming, "She hit me. She threw something at me. It escalated." However, in 2016, Brown admitted striking Houston that night but claimed it was an accident after trying to get a drug dealer out of the residence. Said Brown: "I turned around to her, drew back my hand and smacked her across the face. The moment it happened, I was stunned and full of regret." In March 2004, Brown was sentenced to 60 days in jail for violating probation, with his attack on Houston being included. Brown was initially charged with a misdemeanor battery charge though Houston had refused to charge her husband.

=== Being Bobby Brown and divorce ===
Their marriage further deteriorated in 2005, the same year their reality TV series, Being Bobby Brown, aired on Bravo. Said Brown: "The last few years of our marriage, it was terrible. Both of us trying to be clean, or one of us trying to be clean." Said Houston in 2009, "I remember saying to God one day, I said, 'Give me one day of strength.' Because I was weak. I was so weak to the love, because he was my drug." Being Bobby Brown drew criticism for what critics perceived to be unflattering moments from the couple, but still achieved high ratings. However, the show was not renewed for a second season after Houston declined further participation. When asked why did she participate in Being Bobby Brown, Houston explained to Oprah Winfrey, "I just wanted people to know that I was his wife. I knew I was trying to be Mrs. Bobby Brown. ... I was trying to make a statement. Like, '[The press isn't] gonna win. You're not going to do that. We got married. We were in love. We were crazy for each other.' … We fought for that. And then somehow it got really kind of messy and got lost," adding she "wasn't happy with the marriage. I was losing me." Brown said in 2012, "We looked at the bubble and saw ourselves. We [were] able to see that our drug use had affected our relationship, had affected the love that we felt for each other."

Brown was also reportedly promiscuous throughout the marriage and had been accused of cheating on Houston with various women. During the early years of the marriage, Houston publicly denied Brown was unfaithful to her, but in her 2009 interview with Oprah Winfrey, she admitted she knew of Brown's infidelity, stating, "I just knew. I was like, 'You don't smell right. You don't look right. Something's going on'. And then all this other stuff started coming out about him being with this one or that one or being too promiscuous." In January 2006, rumors circulated that Houston had ditched Brown and had separated from him; at the time Brown denied the rumors saying "The rumors are wrong. They're false. She's the better half of me. … We're loving life, and we're just trying to be as good to each other as possible." During that night, Brown performed a show in New Haven, Connecticut where Houston was a no-show, to which Brown claimed the singer missed her flight because "she had a dental appointment. … I will dedicate this show to her." Houston confirmed she had left Brown that year and moved to Los Angeles. Sources claimed Brown's affair with Karrine Steffans was "the final straw".

In September 2006, Houston's publicist announced that the singer had filed for legal separation from Brown. A month later, that October, Houston upgraded the filing to divorce, in which Houston sought full custody of their then 13-year-old daughter Bobbi Kristina with Brown receiving visitation rights. The divorce was granted on April 24, 2007. Houston confirmed that she had Brown sign a prenuptial agreement the day prior to marrying him in 1992.

=== Aftermath ===
In 2008, Brown planned to release a book titled Bobby Brown: The Truth, the Whole Truth and Nothing But, written with author Derrick Handspike. The book included controversial comments about Houston, including the claim from Brown that Houston had an "ulterior motive" in marrying him due to her bisexuality and that she introduced him to "hard drugs". When those comments were leaked to the press, the singer backed out of the project. Handspike issued the book not long after Houston's death in 2012 though Brown didn't promote it.

Around that time, Brown began getting involved with Alicia Etheredge, who would become his manager and future wife while Houston settled into life as a single woman raising Bobbi Kristina primarily on her own.

In 2008 (Note: One source says 2010.), reports claimed Houston was dating singer and reality TV star Ray J, who was 18 years Houston's junior.

At the time, Brown said he was aware of the alleged affair and that Ray J had written a diss track towards him titled "Boyfriend" but decided against addressing it and stating he was okay with the two seeing each other. Ray J has since denied he and Houston were dating, only claiming to be friends with the superstar.

In a September 2009 interview with Oprah Winfrey, Houston told Winfrey that Brown had been verbally abusive during their marriage and even spat on her on one occasion while drunk.

In February 2011, Houston attended the funeral of Brown's mother Carole and sang "Take My Hand, Precious Lord" and "Never Would Have Made It" with members of Brown's group New Edition at the funeral service. Houston, along with Etheredge, reportedly consoled Brown.

Houston and Brown were seen for the last time together on February 5, 2012 in Los Angeles to celebrate the latter's 43rd birthday with their 18-year-old daughter Bobbi Kristina. During an interview with Today host Matt Lauer, Brown said of Houston during their last meeting that the singer "had this glow about her that was just, you know, incredible. I'm saying to myself, you know, 'She must be ... she must be doing really well,' because she looked really well. ... looked like she was in a good place." Six days later, Houston was found dead at her hotel room at the Beverly Hilton. During a concert in Mississippi with his group New Edition that same night, an emotional and weeping Brown kept looking up and shouting "I love you, Whitney!"

On February 18, Brown attended Houston's funeral at New Hope Baptist Church but later left after arguments with security over seating arrangements: Houston's family had requested Brown only bring three people with him to the funeral, the singer brought nine. A distraught Brown stated later he went to Houston's gold casket, kissed it and subsequently left the church before the service began.

== Bobbi Kristina Brown ==
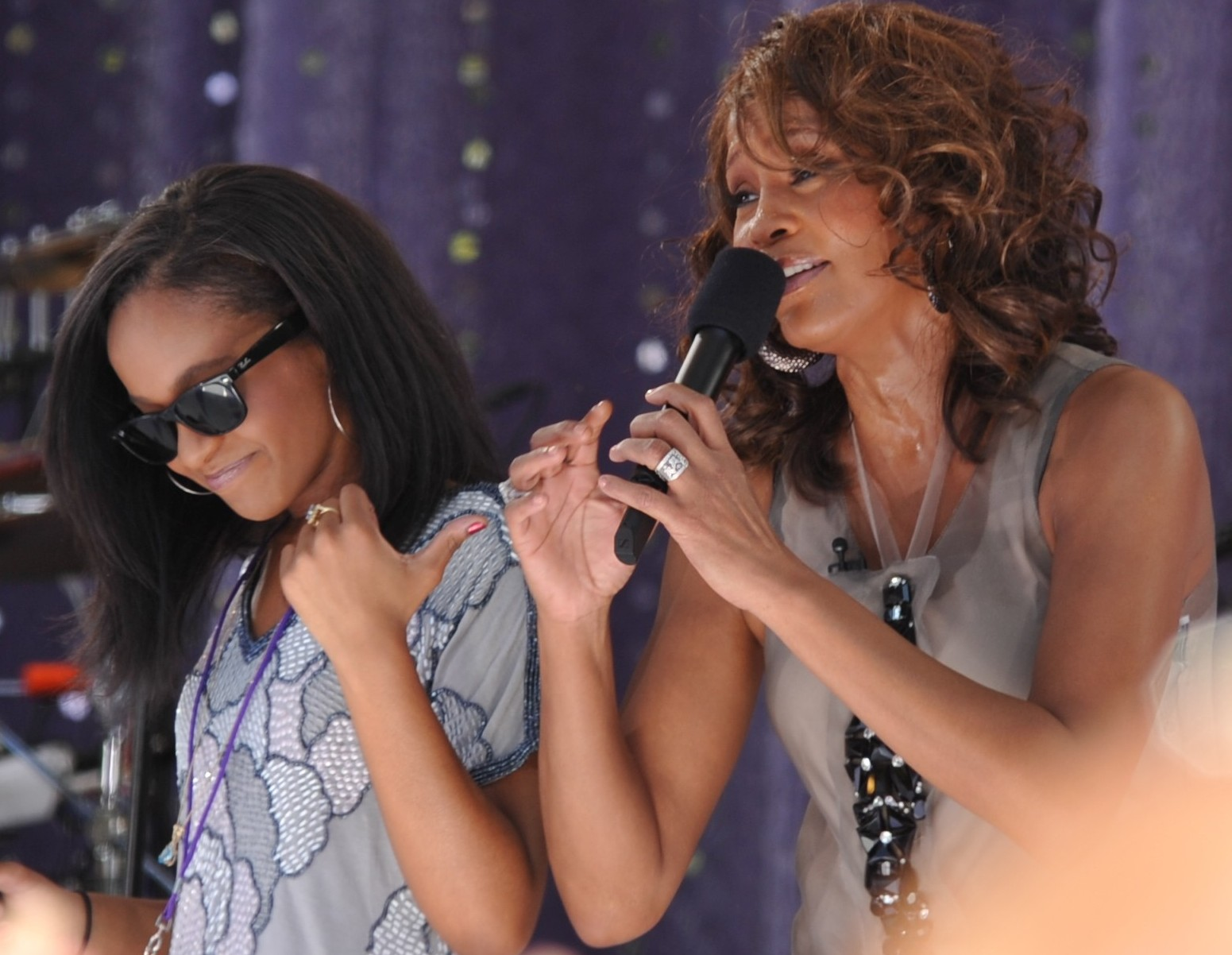
Houston with her daughter Bobbi Kristina Brown during a performance on Good Morning America in 2009.

Upon the birth of her only child, Bobbi Kristina Brown, in March 1993, Houston told Anthony DeCurtis of Rolling Stone: "I could never do anything that could top that. There’s been nothing more incredible in my life than having her. God knows, I have been in front of millions and millions of people, and that has been incredible, to feel that give-take thing. But, man, when I gave birth to her and when they put her in my arms, I thought: 'This has got to be it. This is the ultimate.' I haven’t experienced anything greater."

As a baby, Brown grew up in front of cameras, appearing beside Houston during an interview with Barbara Walters at eight months old, and appearing at the age of one on stage at the 1994 American Music Awards, when her mother accepted an award. Her vocals were featured on her mother's 1998 song "My Love Is Your Love" for the album of the same title. When her mother brought her to the recording studio and held her up to the microphone, she said "Sing, mommy," which can be heard during the first verse of the song; she says, "Clap your hands!" at the end of the track.

Brown was featured on her mother's 2003 Christmas album, titled One Wish: The Holiday Album, on "The Little Drummer Boy". When Brown's parents divorced in 2007, her mother was awarded custody.

The Guardian writer Caroline Sullivan characterized Brown's childhood as "difficult" because of her parents' drug problems. TheWrap stated, "Brown grew up under the media glare, with her family issues playing out in a very public way." The media also scrutinized Brown's weight; BET, Essence, and the Daily Beast all wrote articles commenting and speculating on Brown's fluctuating weight. Author Mark Bego characterized Brown's teenage years as "no picnic", because of the media focus on her and her "extreme growing pains" because of that.

Brown and Houston maintained a close bond following Houston and Brown's father's divorce in 2007. When Houston died in February 2012, Brown was described as "inconsolable" and a few days later was admitted to Cedars-Sinai Medical Center in Los Angeles: according to a family friend, Brown was "overwhelmed". In accordance with her mother's will, Brown was the beneficiary of Houston's entire estate including her clothing, jewelry, cars, personal effects, and furniture. The will provided for Brown to receive trust fund payments in installments until she reached age 30, after which she was to receive the remainder of Houston's $115 million estate.

In March 2012, Brown said she felt her mother's spirit and expressed her intention to carry on her mother's legacy by doing the "singing thing," along with starting a career as an actor and dancer. She was subsequently cast in her acting debut for a recurring role as Tina the receptionist in Tyler Perry's For Better or Worse television series. Perry stated "She did a fantastic job. And that kid has such a future. She's such an actor. I'm so proud of her. I'm telling you, as far as she wants to go in the business, she can." After rumors began Brown had "tearfully exited the set" of the show, Perry came to her defense stating that had never happened. Brown hoped to be cast in Angela Bassett's biographical film Whitney based on her mother. When Bassett did not cast her, Brown called her a "bitch". Bassett said that she did not cast Brown "for a number of reasons... she's not an actress, and acting is a craft". Brown later apologized to Bassett on Twitter after generating controversy among fans.

In July 2013, Brown announced her engagement to a close family friend, Nick Gordon, who had come to live in the Houston household when he was 12 years old but was never formally adopted. The announcement caused controversy within the family; before making their romantic involvement known, Brown had referred to him as her "big bruh" in online posts. Brown said the couple received her grandmother Cissy's blessing prior to their engagement. Though the two never legally married, Brown and Gordon announced they had married on January 9, 2014.

=== Death ===
On January 31, 2015, Gordon and a friend found Brown face down in a bathtub in her home in Alpharetta, Georgia. They began CPR until emergency medical services personnel arrived. According to the police spokesperson, Brown was alive and breathing after being transported to North Fulton Hospital in Roswell, Georgia. At first, they found no evidence to indicate that drugs or alcohol caused the incident, but this was later disputed. Doctors placed Brown in an induced coma after determining her brain function was "significantly diminished", and her family was told a meaningful recovery would be "a miracle".

Brown died in hospice care on July 26, 2015, at age 22. Her death was considered similar to her mother's death, as both had died from effects of being submerged in a bathtub. The initial autopsy found no "obvious underlying cause of death and no significant injuries", and the Fulton County Medical Examiner's office said more tests were forthcoming. A statement released by the family thanked "everyone for their tremendous amount of love and support during these last few months". Several prominent celebrities offered their condolences, including Chris Brown, Oprah Winfrey, and Whitney Houston protégées Brandy and Monica. Funeral services were held August 1, 2015, at St. James United Methodist Church in Alpharetta, Georgia. Brown was buried two days later, between her mother and maternal grandfather, at Fairview Cemetery in Westfield, New Jersey.

The Fulton County Medical Examiner's office said it used both medical records and police investigative files to arrive at a determination for Brown's cause of death. According to the statement, her body tested positive for marijuana, alcohol, the cocaine metabolite benzoylecgonine, benzodiazepines (typically used to treat anxiety) and morphine.

As to the cause of death, it found the "underlying cause" of death as "immersion associated with drug intoxication". However, the manner of death could not be confirmed. The summary statement read, "Death was clearly not due to natural causes, but the medical examiner was not able to determine whether death was due to intentional or accidental causes, and therefore classified the manner of death as undetermined."

A finalized autopsy report determined Brown died of lobar pneumonia.

In 2021, Lifetime released the documentary Whitney Houston & Bobbi Kristina: Didn't We Almost Have It All, which The Atlanta Journal-Constitution called "...less an exposé and more a loving tribute to these two women".

== Friendships ==
=== Early friendships ===
Houston's earliest friendships in show business included singers Chaka Khan and Luther Vandross, first meeting Khan around 1978 where after Houston's mother alarmed her of Houston's vocal talent, she booked a recording session for the teenage singer and subsequently being amazed by the singer's vocal skills. The two singers lost contact with each other around 1982 but reunited on the set of Houston's music video to her hit cover of Khan's "I'm Every Woman". Khan had previously told Houston that she approved of her cover of the song stating that she was "the only person who could do it". In 1995, Houston personally handpicked Khan to be featured on the soundtrack of Houston's feature film Waiting to Exhale; Khan did the only cover on the album recording a modern quiet storm rendition of "My Funny Valentine", produced by Babyface.

In 1999, Khan joined Houston onstage at the second VH1 Divas Live concert to perform "I'm Every Woman" together. In 2011, Houston, in the urgency of Prince, joined Khan onstage where the two embraced and sang Khan's 1974 hit "Tell Me Something Good". Following Houston's death in 2012, Khan was one of several celebrities who disapproved of Clive Davis' decision to carry on with his pre-Grammy party at the Beverly Hilton, where Houston had died. She told Piers Morgan that the decision was "complete insanity" and doubted Houston would've wanted the party to continue, saying she was "the type of person who would have said 'stop everything! Uh-uh, I'm not gonna be there." Later that year, Khan took the stage at that year's BET Awards to sing "I'm Every Woman" as an honor to Houston.

She met Vandross around that same time and year. After recording background vocals on songs from Khan's sophomore album, Naughty (1980), Vandross gave Houston a note but advised her not to open it until she got home. When Houston read the note, it said "you are gonna be one of the greatest singers who ever lived." Vandross opted to produce a teenage Houston but Cissy Houston rebuffed him, telling him that she would have to finish school first.

In 1985, Vandross had Houston open for him on his tour to support his multi-platinum album The Night I Fell in Love just as Houston was enjoying success on her self-titled debut album. Two years later in 1987, the pair joined Stevie Wonder and Dionne Warwick onstage at the first annual Soul Train Music Awards, performing the latter artist's hit "That's What Friends Are For", with Houston and Vandross taking the places of Gladys Knight and Elton John respectively. The performance is notable for Houston and Vandross' powerful vocals eliciting the biggest responses from the audience. In 1990, Vandross wrote and produced the new jack swing-influenced track "Who Do You Love" for Houston's hit album I'm Your Baby Tonight. It later became the b-side of Houston's hit cover of Khan's "I'm Every Woman".

Both artists paid tribute to the other. In 1999, Houston sang Vandross' hit "So Amazing" at the 13th annual Soul Train Music Awards to the singer before awarding Vandross the Quincy Jones Career Achievement Award. Two years later, in 2001, Vandross sang a gender-swapped version of "All the Man That I Need" at the first annual BET Awards in tribute to Houston, who became the first recipient of its Lifetime Achievement Award. Following Vandross' 2003 near-fatal stroke, his record label J Records released the hit single "Dance with My Father". In its video, Houston sent pictures of herself being lifted and embraced by Vandross following up with a picture of her father John, who had died the same year, joining other celebrities who did the same. During the Soul Divas Tour in 2004, Houston covered the Vandross hits "Superstar" and "Never Too Much" as a tribute to the ailing vocalist. In October 2005, months after Vandross' death, Houston honored him at BET's silver anniversary.

In 1982, when Houston was first setting up her live band for showcases at nightclubs to secure a record deal, she hired bassist Rickey Minor to be the bass player, starting a friendship that would last Houston's lifetime. After Minor replaced John Simmons as Houston's musical director following Simmons's untimely death from an AIDS-related illness, Houston and Minor would collaborate on ideas for the singer's shows, including adding several medleys to the show.

Another early friendship was with fellow pop-soul singer Cherrelle, with whom Houston met in 1984, shortly after the singer signed with Arista and had a hit with the Teddy Pendergrass duet, "Hold Me" and Cherrelle also was enjoying chart success with the R&B hit "I Didn't Mean to Turn You On". Cherrelle was later shown with Houston on the reality TV series Being Bobby Brown. When Houston left Brown and moved to Laguna Hills, California in 2006, Cherrelle moved in with her to help Houston curb her substance addiction. They remained close up until Houston's death.

In the mid-1980s, Houston began listening to the gospel sibling group the Winans and singing their signature ballad "Tomorrow" during her 1985 US tour.

When members Marvin and Carvin heard of this, the duo went to see Houston perform in California. Afterwards, the brothers came backstage to thank Houston for covering them, eventually starting a close friendship with all of the group's four members.

Marvin Winans would later preside the wedding of Houston and Bobby Brown and would deliver the final eulogy at Houston's funeral.

=== BeBe & CeCe Winans ===
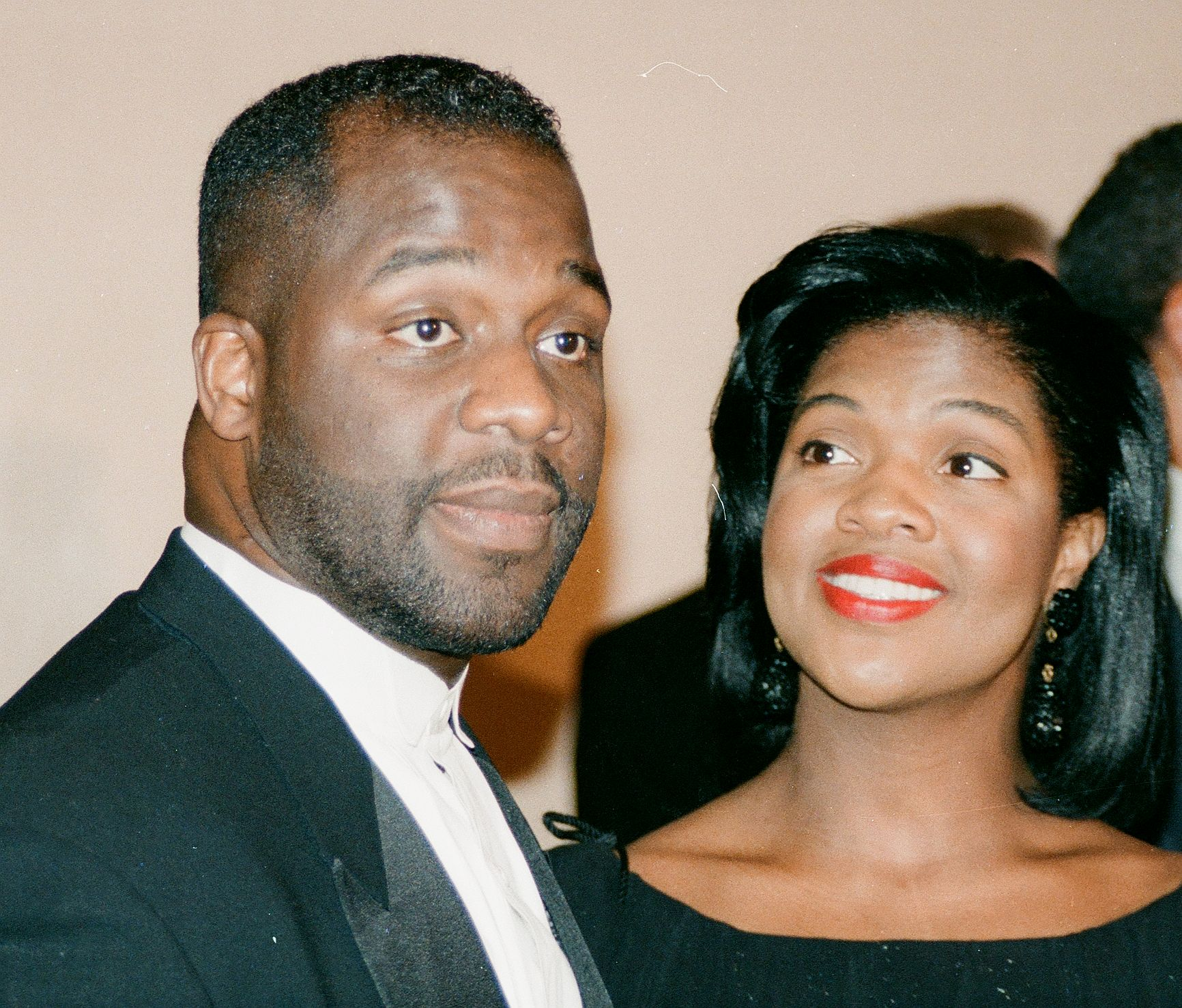
Houston constantly collaborated with BeBe & CeCe Winans both on record and live onstage.

Later, in 1987, Houston introduced herself to the group's younger siblings BeBe Winans and their younger sister CeCe, then recording professionally as the sibling duo BeBe & CeCe Winans, at that year's NAACP Image Awards.

The trio immediately bonded over their shared spiritual faith despite Houston and the Winans siblings belonging to two different Christian denominations. Houston would sometimes join the duo onstage performing alongside them. In 1988, Houston recorded vocals on the duo's hit album, Heaven. Houston constantly referred to BeBe & CeCe as her "brother and sister".

By 1989, BeBe Winans began producing music for Houston and contributed the funk song "I'm Knockin'", which Houston recorded for her I'm Your Baby Tonight album in 1990 while also producing the gospel-inflected dance-pop song "Takin' a Chance", which became a hit for Houston in Japan. In 1991, Houston added vocals on BeBe and CeCe's album, Different Lifestyles.

Two years later, BeBe produced with Houston a contemporary rendition of the hymn, "Jesus Loves Me", for Houston's soundtrack to The Bodyguard, to which Winans later shared a Grammy Award with Houston for Album of the Year.

In 1992, both BeBe and CeCe participated in Houston's star studded wedding to Bobby Brown. A year later, following the birth of Bobbi Kristina Brown in 1993, Houston appointed CeCe as Brown's godmother.

In June 1995, Houston and CeCe performed a stirring rendition of Paul Simon's "Bridge Over Troubled Water", in the version originally arranged by Aretha Franklin at the 1995 VH1 Honors, receiving a standing ovation.

That same year, Houston hired CeCe to duet on her, brother Michael and Babyface's composition "Count On Me", which became a Grammy-nominated top ten single for the two singers.

In June 1996, Houston and Winans were the cover story on an issue of Ebony where the two discussed their close relationship.

When Houston tried to kick her drug addiction, she sometimes would spend time at either BeBe or CeCe's homes in the Nashville area.

An emotional BeBe Winans attended Houston's funeral in February 2012 and spoke of missing "crazy Whitney". With his siblings CeCe and Marvin next to him, BeBe started by saying, "We spent a lot of time together and we talk about her voice and we talk about her talent, which was a beautiful thing, but what I’m going to miss is crazy Whitney".

Illuminating this point, BeBe Winans recalled Houston buying him and his sister outfits for their debut headlining tour. Houston mentioned buying suits for the duo and the entire band and buying herself a dress because, Winans added, "she decided at the height of her career she was going to come sing background with BeBe and CeCe", despite the fact that it "made Clive mad."

When Winans told her that it wasn't necessary and that it "wasn't a material relationship", Houston asked them, "you my brother and sister, right?" to which Winans said "yes". Houston then asked "and I'm your sister, right? And we love each other, right?" to which Winans again said "yes" to both questions.

The congregation erupted in laughter when Winans mentioned Houston asking them, "and y'all broke, right? And I'm rich, right? And I can buy what I want to for y’all, right?" to which Winans added, "And that is the Whitney. That is the Whitney," then adding that that was the Houston he would miss the most before launching into his song, "I Really Miss You", which Winans had originally written for his late elder brother Ron, but re-dedicated to Houston.

Later in the funeral, CeCe took to the pulpit to belt the song "Don't Cry for Me", which she had originally recorded in 1988 and which Houston herself covered live during an AIDS benefit concert in 1994, and "Jesus Loves Me", a song Houston recorded for the soundtrack to The Bodyguard.

=== Kevin Costner ===
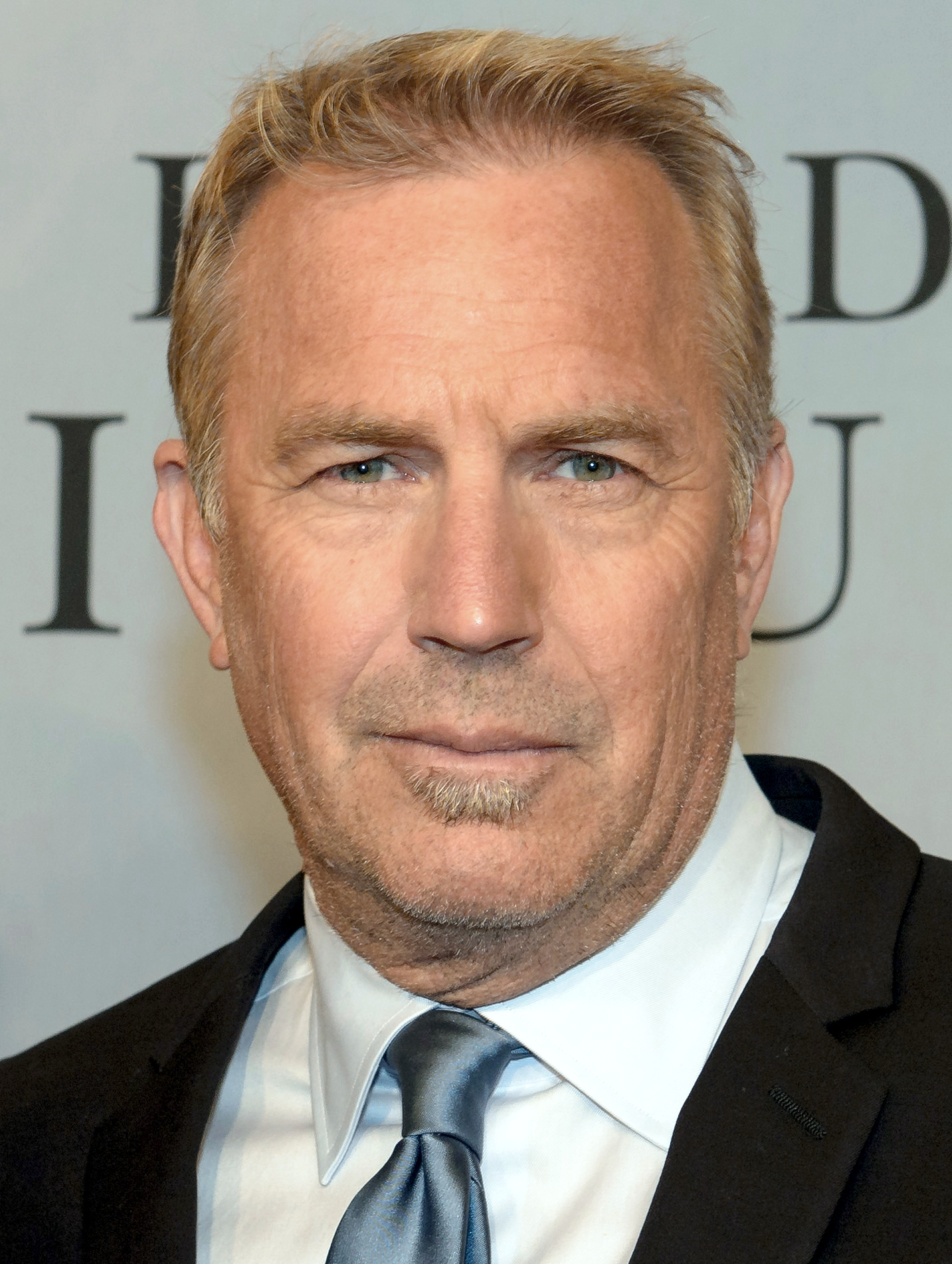
Kevin Costner convinced Houston to star in The Bodyguard in 1990.

One of Houston's most notable friendships was with actor Kevin Costner. In 1989, Costner began trying to court the singer to play the character of pop singer Rachel Marron in The Bodyguard. When Houston eventually got in contact with Costner about the film, she asked to read the script.

Afterwards, Houston admitted she kept Costner waiting a while before she could respond to his offer. When Costner reached Houston again in 1990 to do the film, the singer admitted she was nervous about doing the film asking Costner if she was "good enough" and had Costner promise her he won't "let her fall".

When Costner promised he won't, Houston finally accepted. Despite some hurdles with executives at Warner Bros. Pictures, Costner succeeded in getting Houston the role after a successful screen test.

Throughout the making of the film, Houston and Costner grew closer and their friendship deepened after Houston learned Costner was a devout Baptist like her.

According to Costner later at Houston's memorial service, the actor recalled sharing childhood stories in church. It was through Costner that eventually Houston got to produce the soundtrack to The Bodyguard.

At one point, during promotion of the film following its 1992 release, tabloid stories spread of the two stars engaging in a secretive affair despite both of them being married. The stories were debunked.

Houston and Costner maintained a friendship that would last Houston's lifetime. Costner later admitted the two bonded while making The Bodyguard after Houston decided to only bring Robyn Crawford with her throughout the making of the film so she could solely focus on the film.

Following Houston's death, Costner initially was just gonna attend Houston's private funeral. It was only after Houston's cousin, singer Dionne Warwick, called him to speak at her funeral did he agree to be one of the speakers. His 17-minute eulogy on Houston at her funeral on February 18, 2012 was well received by the congregation.

=== Aretha Franklin ===
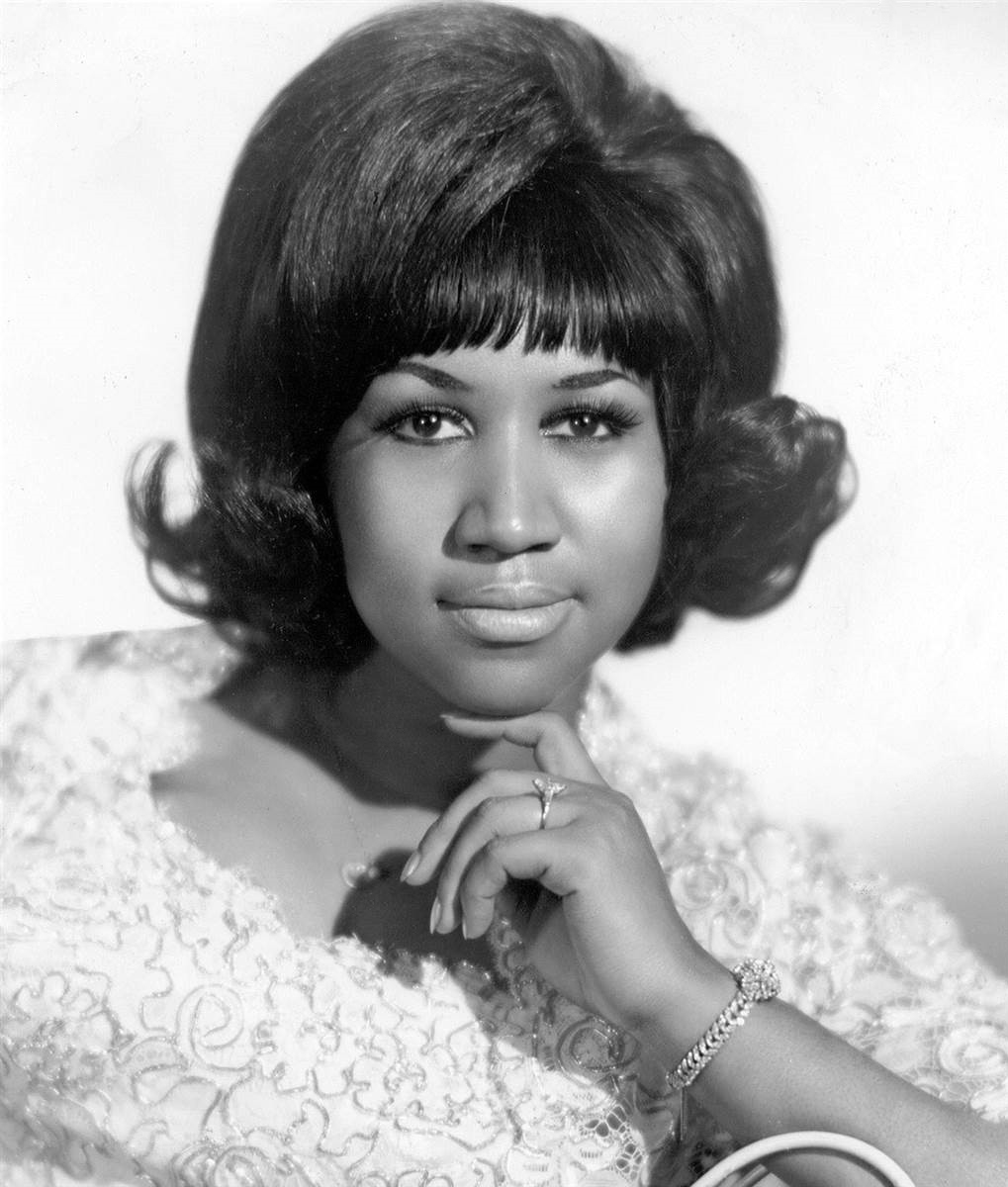
Houston affectionately named Aretha Franklin "Aunt Ree".

Houston was a child when she first met Aretha Franklin. Houston was reportedly just four years old when she began going to recording studios with her mother Cissy.

Houston would witness Franklin recording with her mother's group the Sweet Inspirations. Franklin herself recalled a young Houston telling her that she would grow up to sing like her mother.

Franklin sometimes would stop by Houston's family's residences in both Newark and East Orange. By her preteens, Houston regularly began calling Franklin "Aunt Ree". When Houston signed with Arista Records, the label's press junkets first presented Franklin as a "family friend" and "honorary aunt".

In 1986, just as Houston's career was starting to take off, Franklin was interviewed by MTV about the rising star, saying young Whitney was "kind of shy, lovely girl, very nice young lady."

Contrary to popular belief, Houston wasn't Franklin's goddaughter. According to Houston's mother, Houston joked that Franklin was her godmother in an interview. The press soon ran that as fact and, Cissy Houston said, her daughter failed to correct this error. Houston's actual godmother was fellow American soul singer Darlene Love, who began collaborating with Houston's mother and Dionne Warwick in the early 1970s.

By the time Houston signed with Arista, she remained cordial with Franklin, who was also recording for the label. In 1985, Houston's popular music video for "How Will I Know" included a brief clip of Franklin from her music video to her hit "Freeway of Love".

In 1988, Clive Davis hired Houston to collaborate with Franklin on the duet, "It Isn't, It Wasn't, It Ain't Ever Gonna Be" for the latter's album, Through the Storm. The song's producer Narada Michael Walden later recalled the session becoming frosty when Houston came to record the song at Detroit's United Sound Studios with a testy Franklin. When Houston spotted her and warmly greeted the then 46-year-old singer, Franklin responded, "and you are Ms. Houston".

The session proved to be quick - once Houston completed her vocals for the song, she quickly embraced Walden and Franklin and left. Franklin later had Walden to redo her vocal to match Houston's, not being satisfied with her performance. Walden recalled days later Franklin called more apologetically and asked if she treated Houston wrong to which Walden agreed.

When she asked him if she should call Houston to apologize, he agreed. Houston later hired Franklin in 1995 to perform the ballad "It Hurts Like Hell" from the soundtrack to Waiting to Exhale.

Following Houston's death on February 11, 2012, Franklin called CNN telling them that she was devastated and shocked upon hearing the news of Houston's death. It was announced later that Franklin would attend Houston's funeral performing Houston's "Greatest Love of All" the following Saturday. However, Franklin was forced to cancel her appearance due to leg spasms and was forced to rest prior to a performance at Radio City Music Hall later that night.

Many in the media speculated that Franklin had been disinvited by the family but the soul singer denied the charges. In a statement posted by CBS News, Franklin wrote: "Extra TV, the New York Post and Newsday (New York) should stop the BS. I have four invitations and parking passes that were sent to me for the funeral. Extra TV, the New York Post and Newsday (New York) are more interested in sensationalism and negative speculations than the truth." She added: "Cissy does not need ridiculous speculation and neither do I – particularly at this time … Knowing Cissy as well as I do, I know Whitney left home right and properly."

=== Mariah Carey ===
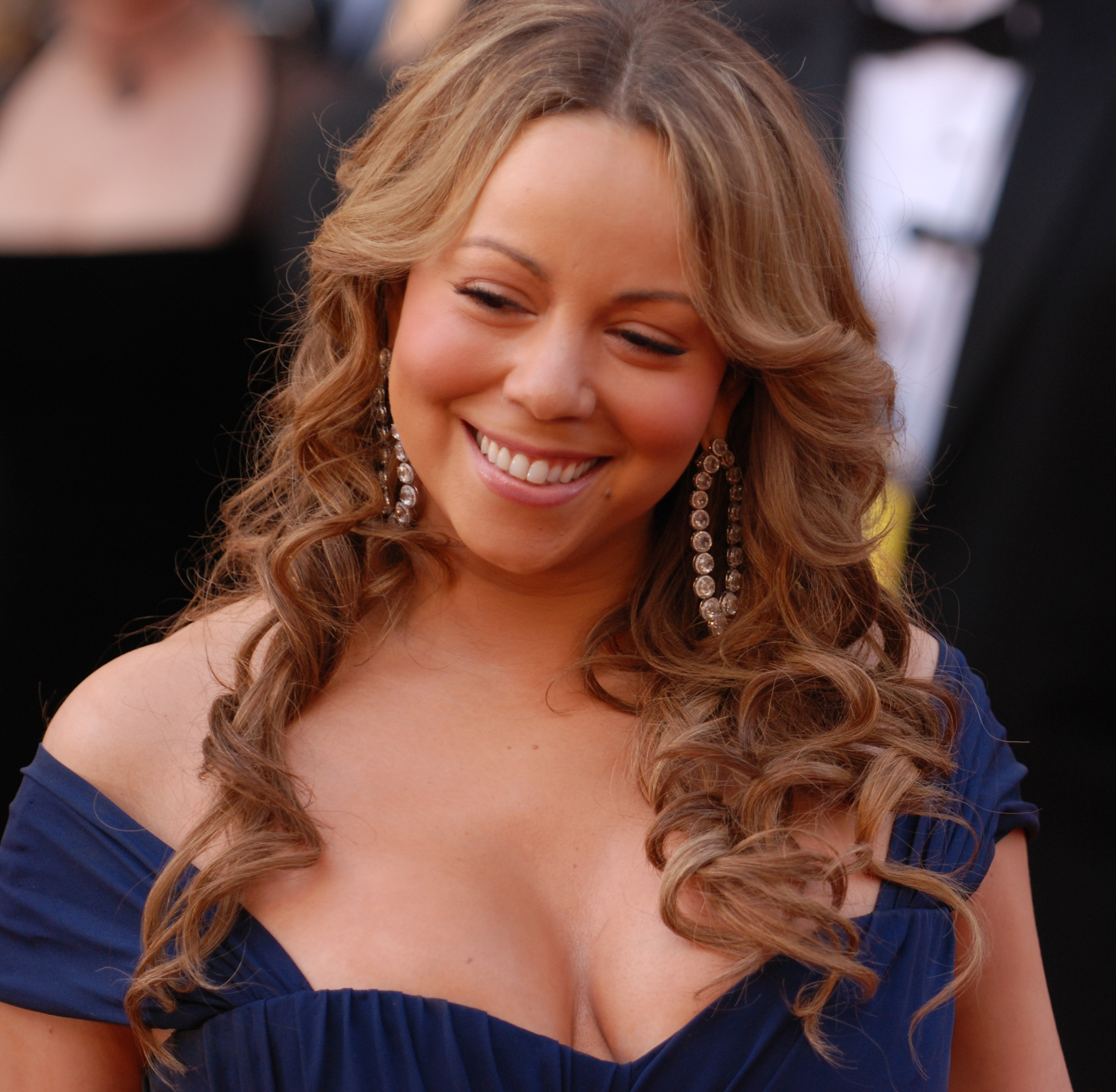
Both Houston and Mariah Carey denied rumors of a rivalry and publicly admired each other in interviews.

Houston and fellow pop-soul diva Mariah Carey were admirers of each other's work. Early in Carey's career, she was often compared to Houston and, before she opened up about her mixed-race background, was referred to as the "white Whitney Houston".

During interviews in which the other would be brought up, both singers were cordial. While Carey would admit to have looked up to Houston, she felt the two were different due to Carey being more of a writer. When Houston was asked about Carey in one interview if she thought of her, Houston pondered a second before answering, "what do I think of her? I don't think of her" but also praised Carey's singing in the same interview. BeBe Winans recalled Houston calling him one day asking him "did you hear that new girl Mariah? Good Lord, she can sing!"

BeBe Winans recalled Houston and Carey had a frosty introduction to the other after Winans convinced a nervous Houston to approach the younger Carey during the 19th American Music Awards in 1992, in which Houston introduced herself to Carey, the singer, according to Winans, responded to Houston by staying quiet and turning her head away and, according to what Houston told Winans, "looked up at the sky".

However, by 1998, the two stars would become friends after they were paired up together for "When You Believe" from The Prince of Egypt, with the other complimenting each other on their talents and personalities. Said Carey, "It's sort of a message song. It's what Prince of Egypt is about, Moses. If we were ever going to come together on any kind of record, this is definitely the right one, and really the coolest thing to me is that after all of the drama and everybody making it like we had a rivalry, she was just really cool and we had a really good time in the studio. We had fun. And so, if nothing else, it was a good experience... and diva-ism, whatever. I never even really talked to her until this. We never had any issues between us. The media and everybody made it an issue." Houston told Ebony of Carey, "I enjoyed working with her very much. Mariah and I got along very great. We had never talked and never sang together before. We just had a chance for camaraderie, singer-to-singer, artist-to-artist, that kind of thing. We just laughed and talked and laughed and talked and sang in between that ... It's good to know that two ladies of soul can still be friends. We talked about doing other things together, enterprise-wise, which is cool, because she's got a good, vivid mind, that girl. She's a smart lady. I really like Mariah."

Still, tabloids tried to make it like the singers had a heated rivalry including one tabloid report that the two divas had to record separately due to "tension". To make fun of the claims, the singers came onstage at the 1998 MTV Video Music Awards in the same dress to which both singers ripped parts of the dress off, with both singers showing their legs, instantly becoming viral.

The singers remained close until Houston's death. Carey later attended Houston's funeral and was seen tearful and weeping throughout the service with then-husband Nick Cannon. At the BET Awards that year, Carey took to the stage to talk about their endearing friendship; at one point Carey struggled to keep her composure nearly breaking down in tears as she reminisced on their friendship. Carey's 2012 single, "Triumphant (Get 'Em)", was partially inspired by Houston's passing.

=== Brandy ===
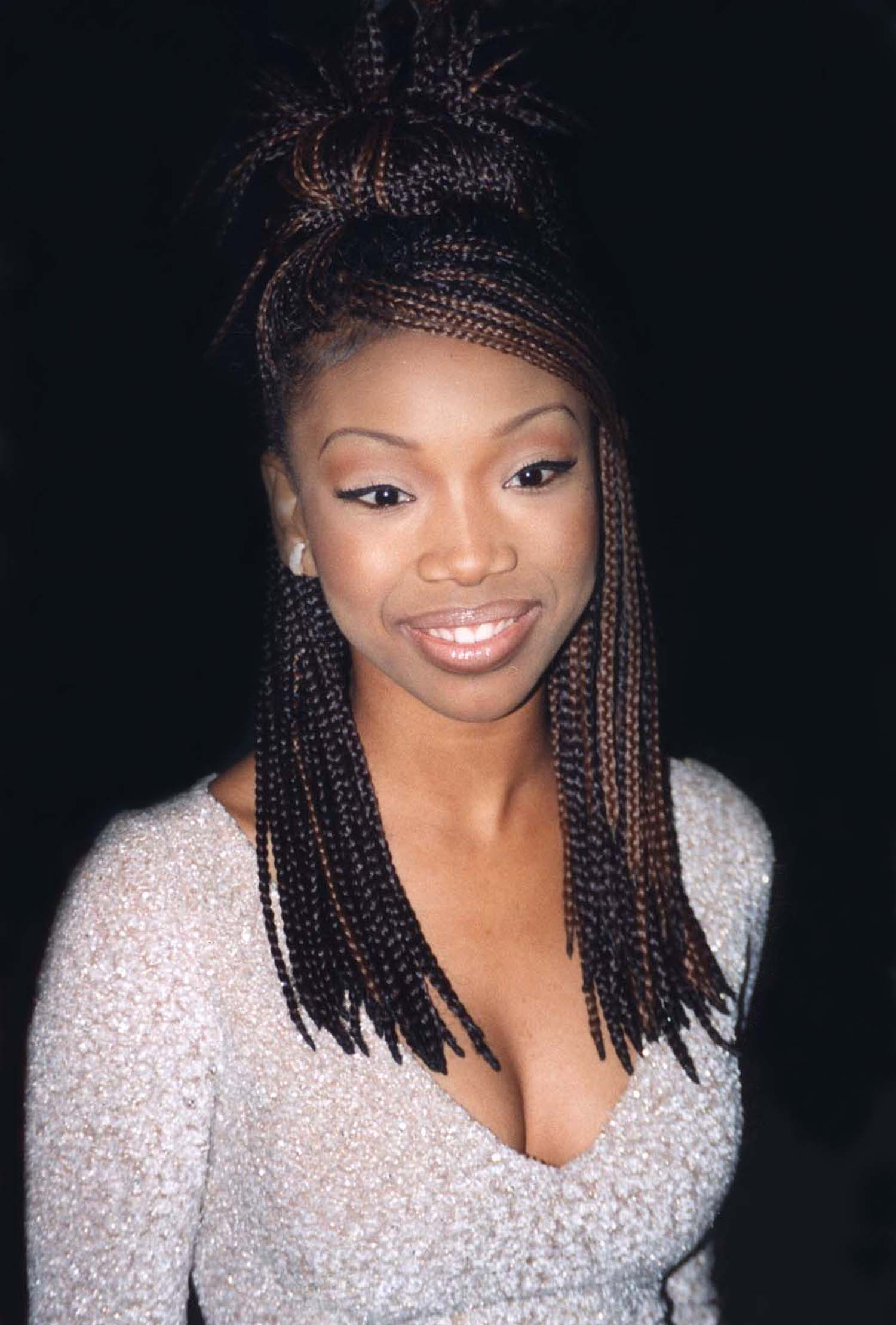
Houston gave Brandy Norwood the titular role in the 1997 adaptation of Rodgers and Hammerstein's Cinderella.

Singer and actress Brandy Norwood had been a fan of Houston's since first seeing her music videos on MTV. After viewing her video for "Greatest Love of All" at the age of seven, she told her mother that she wanted to "be like" Houston.

In 1991, while attending a concert by BeBe & CeCe Winans, Brandy got backstage to the Winans's dressing room and asked if she could speak to Houston, knowing they were close to the singer after seeing them together on TV several times. They eventually got Houston on the phone and they talked for several minutes with Houston encouraging her to follow her dreams of singing.

In 1995, while preparing for the Nickelodeon Kids' Choice Awards, Houston met an excited Brandy who was caught by cameras being so surprised by Houston's appearance that she ran off before Houston convinced her to come back, embracing the now-successful teen star on her success. That year, Houston hired Norwood to record the hit song "Sittin' Up in My Room" for the Waiting to Exhale soundtrack.

Two years after that, Houston hired Brandy to become Cinderella in her 1997 adaptation of Rodgers and Hammerstein's Cinderella. It would be around this same period that Houston became a personal friend and mentor to Brandy; Houston nicknamed herself Brandy's "godmother".

In February 2012, Brandy and fellow R&B artist Monica, another close friend of Houston's , were having an interview with Clive Davis as they were preparing for a performance at Davis's pre-Grammy party when a wet and erratic Houston crashed the interview with her daughter.

As Houston embraced Monica and Davis, she turned to Brandy and handed her a suspicious note, the contents of which Norwood has yet to disclose publicly.

Two days later, Houston died at her hotel suite at the Beverly Hilton on Brandy's 33rd birthday. The singer was devastated by Houston's death as she had had a private conversation with the superstar on the phone the day prior with Houston promising Brandy she would "be better."

Houston had also been close to Brandy's brother Ray J around this time, leading to rumors the two were dating. At the funeral, an emotional Brandy consoled her grieving brother who cried throughout the service. Brandy later paid tribute to Houston at the BET Awards that July performing Houston's signature classics "I'm Your Baby Tonight" and "I Wanna Dance with Somebody (Who Loves Me)".

=== Other friendships ===
Houston also befriended producer and songwriter Babyface, with whom she enjoyed years of collaboration with, along with Babyface's musical and business partner L.A. Reid. It would be through Reid that Houston would meet and later befriend Reid's then wife and Cherrelle's cousin, R&B singer Pebbles around 1990. Occasionally Houston would sometimes go out on the town with both Pebbles and Cherrelle. Pebbles later became a minister and started going by the name of Pastor Perri "Pebbles" Reid. Like CeCe, Houston would spend weeks at Reid's Atlanta residence as an attempt to curb her drug use.

Other notable artists, composers and producers who were either friends or acquaintances of Houston's included Arsenio Hall, Anita Baker, Natalie Cole, Janet Jackson, Elton John, Stevie Wonder, Alicia Keys, Tyler Perry, David Foster, Diane Warren, Narada Michael Walden, Lauryn Hill, Miki Howard, Meli'sa Morgan, Alyson Williams, Regina Belle, Kenny G, Kelly Price, Faith Evans, Mary J. Blige, Johnny Gill, Wyclef Jean , Kim Burrell, Gladys Knight, Monica and Ashford and Simpson.

== Legal issues ==
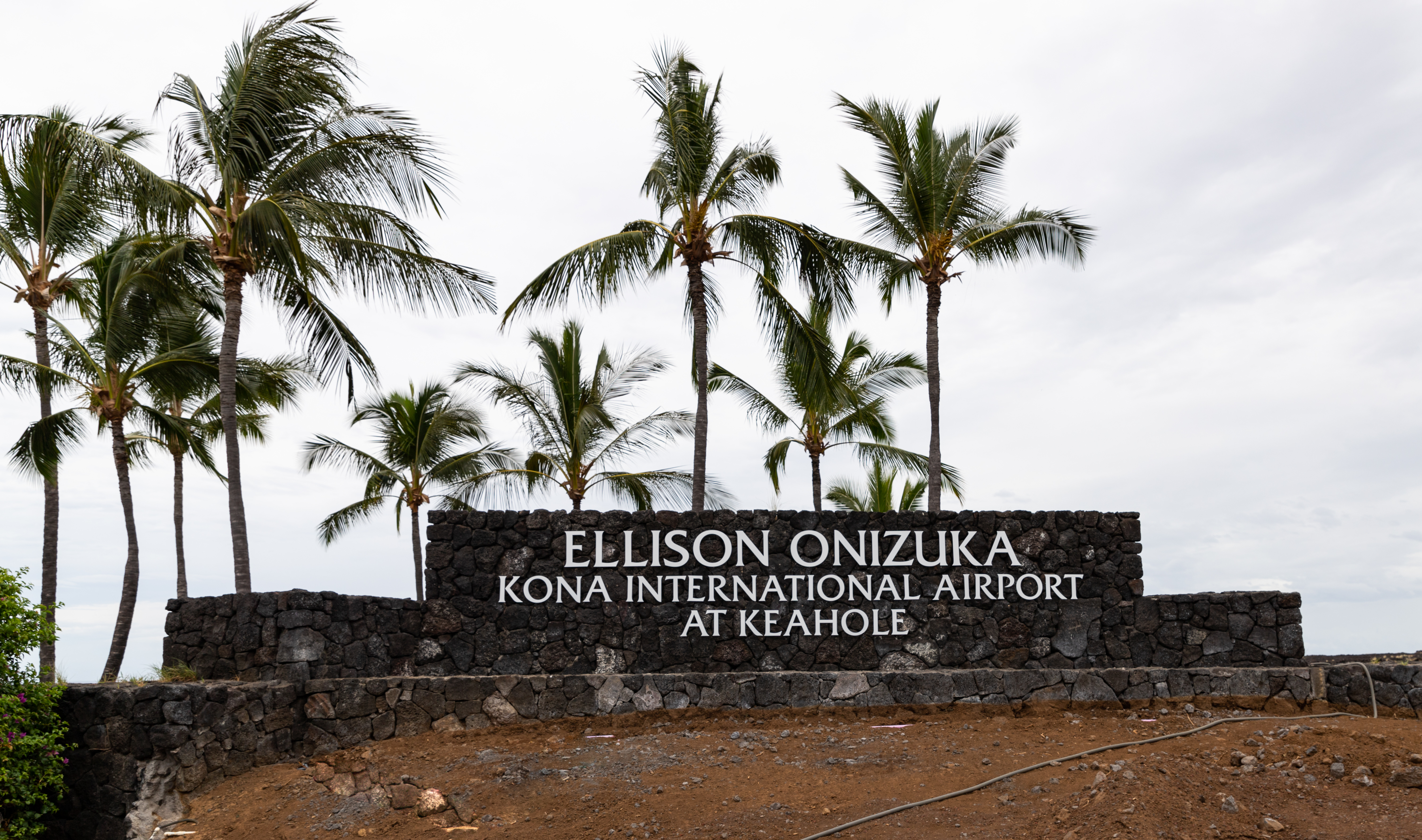
Kona International Airport, then known as Keahole-Kona International Airport, the site where Houston was detained for marijuana possession.

On April 19, 1991, at the start of her I'm Your Baby Tonight World Tour, Houston and her brother Michael got involved in an altercation with three men at a hotel in Lexington, Kentucky, after the men reportedly sought her for an autograph while they were trying to watch the heavyweight championship boxing match between Evander Holyfield and George Foreman.

After seeing the men attack her brother, Houston reportedly jumped on one of the men, Ransom Brotherton, and punched him off her brother before Houston and her entourage fled from the hotel. Brotherton reported the incident, which led to him having to go to the hospital to receive "12 stitches over his left eye".

Houston was charged with fourth degree assault for attacking Brotherton and "threatening to kill him", while her brother was charged with assaulting another man involved in the melee, Kevin Owens.

Charges were dropped against the Houstons in May due to "contradictory evidence" and due to the prosecution struggling to "prove them guilty".

It was later revealed that the altercation began after the three men yelled racial slurs at Houston.

On January 11, 2000, while Houston was traveling with her husband Bobby Brown, airport security guards discovered half an ounce of marijuana in her handbag at Keahole-Kona International Airport in Hawaii. She departed before authorities could arrive.

Houston was initially charged with a misdemeanor drug charge that carried a 30-day sentence and a $1,000 fine. The charges, however, were dropped in March 2001 after prosecutors received a substance abuse assessment from a counselor in New Jersey that stated the singer did not need treatment for substance abuse.

In 2002, Houston became embroiled in a legal dispute with John Houston Enterprise, a company started by her father. The company, run by Kevin Skinner, sued her for $100 million, claiming unpaid compensation. Houston's father died in February 2003, and the lawsuit was dismissed in April 2004, with no compensation awarded.

=== FBI files ===
FBI documents from 1988 to 1999 revealed that Houston was the target of both an alleged blackmail scheme and obsessive fan attention at the height of her career.

The documents reveal that a lawyer from Chicago demanded up to $250,000 to keep "certain details" of her private life out of the press.

The FBI eventually closed the case, after Houston and her father described the sender as a friend and reached a private agreement. The documents also include unsettling correspondence from devoted admirers whose letters and claims, including one who professed love in dozens of messages, leading to FBI inquiries, that were later classified as non-threatening.

== Residences ==
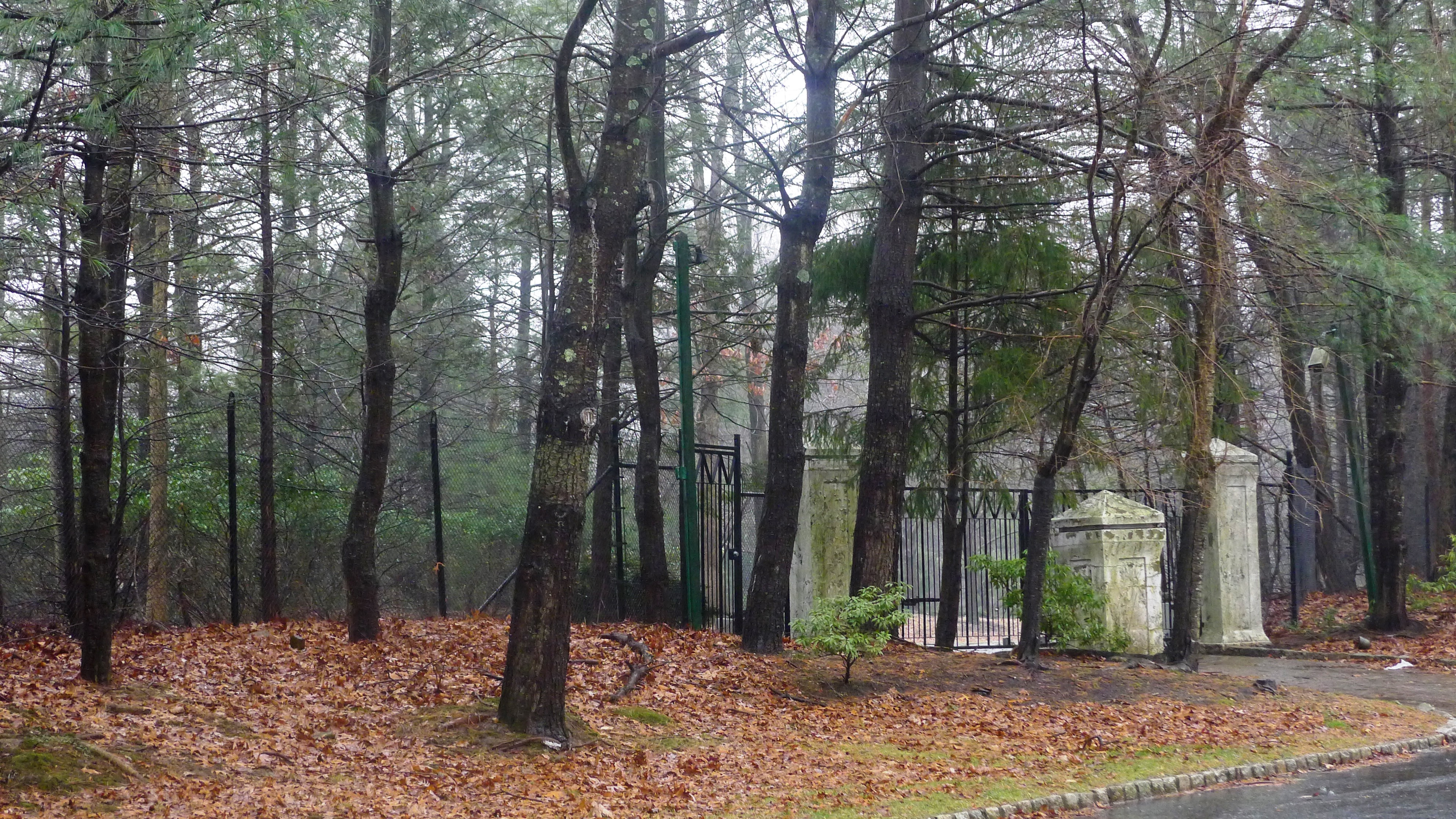
The front entrance of Houston's Mendham Township home.

Following graduation from Mount Saint Dominic Academy in 1981, Houston moved to a two-bedroom apartment at Woodbridge Township with Robyn Crawford the following winter in 1982.

By early 1986, Houston had relocated to a bigger apartment in Fort Lee, just minutes away from Manhattan. The apartment would later be used as the official headquarters of her management and production company, Nippy Inc., which Houston formed in late 1986, and with whom her father presided over during the company's duration.

With help from her father, Houston purchased a mansion in Mendham Township, located at 22 North Gate Road, in late 1987. The 13,607-square-foot house, located at North Gate Road in Mendham, had been built the year prior to Houston purchasing the property.

The house was the primary location for Houston and Bobby Brown's 1992 wedding as well as its driveway being the site where Houston took the photo for the cover of her 1998 album, My Love Is Your Love.

In 1993, Houston purchased a second home in the city, located at 1 Crossway. The home served as the singer's personal recording studio at which she recorded her material, prominently the recordings of The Preacher's Wife, My Love Is Your Love and Just Whitney.

During the latter years of her marriage to Brown, Houston lived in Alpharetta, Georgia, a suburb of Atlanta, splitting time between there and Mendham. In 2003, the couple purchased a mansion in Alpharetta, where much of the taping of the reality series, Being Bobby Brown, was filmed.

Following her separation from Brown, Houston rented a palatial house in Laguna Hills, California in April 2006 and lived there until 2008.

Houston's last house prior to her death was an Alpharetta-based townhouse that was co-owned by Houston's daughter. Houston also owned a condo at Williams Island in Aventura, Florida, a suburb of Miami.

== Sexuality ==
Houston's sexuality has been heavily debated and discussed. During the early 1980s, Houston had been involved in a same-sex relationship with Robyn Crawford, breaking it off a year prior to Houston securing a record deal. During her first fifteen years in the spotlight, the singer was constantly broached on the subject and of Crawford. In 1996, when asked about it by Katie Couric in an interview, Houston told her, "I brought [Crawford] into this madness. She’s been my friend for years. [But] lesbian and gay I’m not. Two titles I can’t claim." In 2000, while being interviewed by the LGBTQ publication, Out, Houston said "If I was gay, I would be proud to tell you ’cause I ain’t that kind of girl to say, 'Naw, that ain’t me.' The thing that hurt me most was that they tried to pin something on me that I was not. My mother raised me to never, ever, be ashamed of what I am. But I’m not a lesbian, darling, I'm not."

Still, Houston's sexuality continued to be speculated. In his book, God’s Other Children: A London Memoir, black British gay rights activist Vernal W. Scott credited Crawford for the role she played in arranging Houston’s attendance, as a surprise speaker, at a 1991 AIDS rally that he organized in London, just as Houston was touring the UK. Scott later sent a thank you note to Houston. He dispatched a separate copy to Crawford whom, he writes, he admired as "the wind beneath [Houston's] wings."

“I reflected upon my meeting with Robyn and Whitney, and especially the chemistry of love that was clearly there between the two women,” Scott writes. “I said that [Whitney’s] sexuality was nobody’s business […] but that I had a need to let her know that there was nothing to be ashamed of.”

At the same AIDS event, Houston and Crawford met another LGBTQ+ activist Peter Tatchell. Following Houston's death, Tatchell wrote: "Whitney Houston RIP. She was happiest and at her peak in the 1980s, when she was with her female partner. They were so loved up and joyful together. It’s important to tell the truth about this aspect of her life. Colluding with the cover-up of her same-sex relationship is not right." Like Scott, Tatchell praised Houston for speaking up about the HIV/AIDS crisis "at a time when many other stars kept their distance." He also claimed she was "pressured" to marry Bobby Brown and suggested her "inability to accept and express her same-sex love contributed to her substance abuse and decline?"

In 2013, Oprah Winfrey asked Houston's mother Cissy if it would've bothered her if her daughter was gay, Cissy admitted it would have. Six years later, however, in 2019, Cissy told queer pastor Bishop Joseph Tolton of LGBT people accepting themselves and being kind, "God wants us to love one another", indicating a change of her opinion from her interview with Winfrey. One of the members of Cissy's group, the Sweet Inspirations, Estelle Brown, was also gay, and she befriended singer Luther Vandross, who was homosexual and mostly kept his sexuality private. Houston's mother herself had a loyal gay following and Houston recalled in 2000 how gay men in her mother's audience at the Manhattan cabaret clubs she headlined during the late 1970s and early 1980s catered to her:

"My mother's best, most beautiful, brightest audience was gay men. We used to work at Reno Sweeney [a trendsetting, '70s Manhattan cabaret]. My mother used to pack that club out. I mean, the queens would be around the corner! Around the corner in a line, waiting to see Miss Cissy. I watched the way my mother dealt with gay people. They could tell her anything and she wouldn't trip. She'd be like [adopting a sassy, worldly voice] 'If so-and-so don't treat you right, fuck 'em. Leave 'em and move on to the next thang.' It was about relationships and loving each other. My mother was an inspiring singer. She sang from her heart about love, the tragedies, the ups, downs, the all-arounds of love, and she somehow made you feel like you'd come out triumphant, no matter what. This had a strong hold for gay people. She'd come out in her slippers and sing. They'd love that. 'Sing, Miss Cissy!' She was real."

Many believed Houston wouldn't have publicly come out due to the fact that she was brought up in a family full of gospel singers and gospel-influenced artists.

Houston's cousin Dee Dee Warwick reportedly struggled with her career as an openly lesbian artist. Because of this, according to Harriet Alexander of The Telegraph, the struggle with coming to terms with their sexualities "brought [Warwick] closer to Houston". Said a family insider: "Whitney felt closer to Dee Dee by virtue of them sharing a similar orientation. It is interesting that there is that connection between them."

Sometime in the late 1980s, tabloids began printing claims that Houston was in a love triangle between actresses Jodie Foster and Kelly McGillis. Neither Houston nor Foster, who has had female partners in the past and is currently married to a woman, ever addressed the rumors but McGillis, who came out as lesbian in 2009, addressed the claims that same year, dismissing them and claiming she had never even met Houston.

In one tabloid article, Houston's sister-in-law Tina Brown claimed to have seen the singer with a female partner at her and brother Bobby Brown's house, claiming she saw Houston and the unnamed woman "without shirts" when she walked in and claimed Houston had a "series of steamy same-sex affairs".

In 2017, her former hair stylist Ellen LaVar claimed Houston was bisexual and said of Crawford: "Robyn provided a safe place for her… in that Whitney found safety and solace." A year later, her friend and former musical director Rickey Minor claimed that if Houston was still alive, she would've probably identified as "sexually fluid".

Houston's ex-husband Bobby Brown claimed she was bisexual and felt if Crawford was still in the singer's life and not pushed out by the singer's family that Houston would still be alive.

Crawford, who identifies as queer, wrote in her book about their early 1980s romance: "We never talked about labels, like lesbian or gay. We just lived our lives and I hoped it could go on that way forever."

The early romantic relationship of Houston and Crawford was explored in the Houston estate-approved biopic, Whitney Houston: I Wanna Dance with Somebody, produced by Houston's former record label boss Clive Davis, directed by Kasi Lemmons and starring Naomi Ackie as Houston and Nafessa Williams as Crawford. Lemmons, who personally knew Houston, said the singer and actress's bisexuality was "an open secret", stating: "There was lots of speculation. For instance, when I met Whitney, Robyn was upstairs in the hotel suite, with her daughter Bobbi Kristina. It was a very significant relationship in her life, a very significant friendship. I think nowadays we would probably just say, 'Well, she's sexually fluid.' We wouldn't necessarily label it as it having to be one thing or another. She certainly was sexually fluid."

== Health ==
During Houston's 1991 tour to support her hit album, I'm Your Baby Tonight, the singer was forced to cancel several concerts in Canada due to concurrent vocal issues.

In June 1993, the New York Post reported that Houston overdosed on diet pills in an attempt to lose weight following the birth of her daughter and had been treated at a Miami-area hospital. The following day after the Post article was published, Houston denied the allegations through her lawyer, Sheldon Platt, with Platt stating, "she has never taken a diet pill in her life. She's outraged. She's hurt." Platt also denied Houston had been taken to the hospital, adding "the article is completely wrong - not accurate - completely out of whack. None of this has happened."

During Houston's 14-year marriage to Bobby Brown, the singer suffered multiple miscarriages, the first occurring during the filming of The Bodyguard and its soundtrack in January 1992. In a 1993 interview with Barbara Walters, the singer confirmed the miscarriage telling Walters, "it was very painful, emotionally and physically. I was back on the set the next day. And it's over. But I had Bobbi Kristina one year later, and I am blessed." In July 1994, while on her world tour, the then 30-year-old singer suffered a second miscarriage that led to some concert dates postponed. Days later, on July 17, Houston returned onstage to perform a six-song medley during the 1994 FIFA World Cup final in Pasadena, California. In December 1996, while promoting The Preacher's Wife, she suffered a third miscarriage.

In September 2001, Houston's extremely rail thin appearance at Michael Jackson's Madison Square Garden concert led to rumors about her health. Her publicist Nancy Seltzer stated at the time, "Whitney has been under stress due to family matters and when she is under stress she doesn't eat." Houston's thin frame was so alarming that the singer was alleged to have died, which Houston's publicist quickly denied. In 2002, she denied reports that she suffered from anorexia and bulimia despite reports from tabloid media.

In 2005, after years of vocal issues, the singer hired voice coach Gary Catona to regain her vocal abilities. In 2012, Catona claimed on the show 20/20 when he first worked with the then 42-year-old singer that her voice was "gone". Her voice had gone "completely hoarse", and that it took years of sessions to get only a part of her sound back.

Catona explained "it appeared to be so damaged that when I first began working with her, I was not sure what I could do." Catona stated that "years of drug use and smoking seemed to have taken a toll on Houston’s ability to belt out her signature notes."

Catona claimed Houston admitted, "I know I’ve done things that have hurt me … and I have to change it." Continued Catona: "She used to say to me, 'People have standards that they expect you to live up to. I mean, I can’t. … I have a problem with that, myself, trying to live up to what I once was.'"

Catona said he saw signs that the singer was giving in to her vices.

"She knew in her heart of hearts that this special gift that she had was being undermined by her own activities. I left her house with my keyboard, and I had forgotten something, and I walked back in and she had a cigarette in her hand. And she saw me. She said, 'Oh Gary,' and she hugged me, and threw the cigarette over my shoulder as she was hugging me."

By 2009, Catona claimed he got Houston to "75 to 80 percent of her original ability". He and Houston parted ways that year, when she released her comeback album, I Look to You.

In June 2011, it was reported that Houston had been diagnosed with emphysema after years of smoking cigarettes.

In the days leading up to her death in February 2012, Houston had told friends and colleagues that she had quit cigarettes and was working on reviving her vocal cords, which had been straining for years.

According to TMZ, Houston was frequenting the medical scene of Beverly Hills that month, leaving one bank of medical offices on February 2, and another on February 7. The tabloid site reported that it was "unclear" who Houston was seeing in those two visits. At the time of her death, the singer suffered from atherosclerotic heart disease.

== Substance use ==
Houston reportedly began using substances as a teenager after being introduced to marijuana by her elder teenage brother Michael. He also claimed that he introduced his little sister to cocaine in the early 1980s though reports have varied on when she first began using the substance.

Houston's best friend Robyn Crawford claimed the singer told her she was fourteen when she began using cocaine, while a friend of Houston’s two brothers named Keith Kelly claimed he first gave her both marijuana and cocaine on the young singer’s 16th birthday in 1979. In a rare candid interview with Jamie Foster Brown of Sister 2 Sister magazine in 2004, Houston opened up a bit about starting her drug use, stating "I started in the hood".

By 1980, she was using both marijuana and cocaine recreationally. Crawford admitted to snorting cocaine alongside Houston as their relationship deepened. She also recalls purchasing cocaine with Houston in the early days of their relationship where they sometimes used the drug all day long.

Eventually, Crawford's mother Janet found out after Crawford's behavior began affecting their relationship. Crawford eventually told Houston to curb their drug use; Houston agreed and though they would still purchase smaller quantities of the substance, the singer began to get more focused on her career and would tell Crawford, "cocaine can't go where we're going."

Crawford eventually quit the substance around the late 1980s while Houston continued using. According to Crawford in her 2019 memoirs, A Song for You, Houston regularly used drugs with her brothers throughout the early and mid to late 1980s.

Gary Garland left the Denver Nuggets basketball team after the 1979-1980 NBA season for failing a drug test and testing positive for cocaine. Cissy Houston reportedly sent Gary to rehab in 1981. Garland would later get arrested for drug offenses in the 1990s during his sister's commercial peak.

According to Crawford, Garland sometimes would miss shows during his sister's concerts due to substance abuse and upon showing up during Houston's prayer circles before shows where Houston would speak up louder in her prayer circle about God protecting them from "negative energy".

Crawford wrote that Houston's first tour, The Greatest Love, was dubbed "The Greatest Drug" tour because "there was cocaine everywhere". According to Crawford, Houston's brother, Michael Houston, often procured it and used with his sister — and Gary had drug struggles, as well. When the tour ended, Houston's drug problem escalated, according to Crawford she'd lock herself away in her bedroom and use.

In the late 1980s, Crawford informed Houston's mother Cissy that her daughter was regularly using cocaine to which Crawford claimed Cissy wasn't moved to do anything about it though Cissy would later claimed she asked Houston about her substance use, to which the singer told her not "to worry about any of that".

According to Cissy, Houston's father John was also concerned. Though he and Cissy knew Houston's brothers Gary and Michael were also struggling with drug use, he told a family friend, "You know, the one I'm really worried about is Nippy. If she has to meet some real crisis or disappointment, I'm worried she won't survive it. Because she's never had to."

When Eddie Murphy failed to allow the singer in at his mansion in Englewood, New Jersey, Houston reportedly went out on the town and had a "two-day cocaine bender", according to Crawford, and came back still emotionally devastated over the Murphy snub.

When Houston and Bobby Brown settled into married life, the couple engaged in doing drugs, locking themselves inside their bedroom at times getting high.

Rolling Stone published a story in June 2000 stating that Cissy Houston and others had held a July 1999 intervention in which they unsuccessfully attempted to persuade Whitney to obtain drug treatment.

In 2019, Robyn Crawford said she departed from Houston's management company in 2000 after Houston declined to seek help for her drug dependency; years earlier, Houston claimed in an interview that the two friends parted ways over Houston's husband. In 2009, Houston acknowledged that drug use had been the reason for her weight loss in 2001.

In 2002, Houston gave an interview with Diane Sawyer to promote her upcoming album. During the interview, she denied rumors of using crack cocaine, famously saying, "crack is cheap" and "crack is whack". She admitted to using various substances, including cocaine, marijuana and prescription pills, but denied having an eating disorder.

A month after the interview, Houston called into then radio shock jock host Wendy Williams's WBLS morning talk show to confront Williams on private information and rumors she was spreading on air about the artist. After Williams asked Houston questions about her drug use, marriage and breast implants, they began a shouting match and Houston said she would have fought Williams if she were younger. In a later interview with Williams, Robyn Crawford said they planned to confront Williams years earlier after she talked about Houston and her relationship with Crawford on air.

In September 2009, Houston was interviewed by Oprah Winfrey. In the interview, she admitted to using drugs with husband Bobby Brown during their marriage and described her struggles with addiction. While Houston denied that she and Brown were on crack cocaine, the singer did admit to basing cocaine and lacing it with marijuana in blunts with Brown.

Houston told Winfrey that before The Bodyguard, her drug use was light, that she used drugs more heavily after the film's success and the birth of her daughter, and that by 1996 "[doing drugs] was an everyday thing ... I wasn't happy by that point in time. I was losing myself." Houston told Winfrey that she had attended a 30-day rehabilitation program. Houston also acknowledged to Winfrey that her drug use had continued after rehabilitation, and that at one point, her mother obtained a court order and the assistance of law enforcement to press her into receiving further drug treatment. Houston's mother recalled the incident in her 2013 book, Remembering Whitney: My Story of Love, Loss, and the Night the Music Stopped; when she visited her daughter's Alpharetta residence in 2005, the walls were "spray-painted" with "big glaring eyes and strange faces. Evil eyes, staring out like a threat", and most of her daughter's head was cut out of a framed photo. Houston herself explained it in her interview with Winfrey. When Winfrey asked Houston if she was drug-free, Houston responded, "'Yes, ma'am. I mean, you know, don't think I don't have desires for it.'"

In May 2011, Houston enrolled in rehabilitation again due to drug and alcohol problems, which she stated was part of her "longstanding recovery process".

On February 11, 2012, Houston died at her hotel suite at the Beverly Hilton in Beverly Hills, California from an accidental drowning in her bathtub. Despite the presence of cocaine, marijuana and various prescription medicines in her system, none of the drugs listed were at extreme doses though prolonged cocaine use was listed as one of the causes; toxicology reports stated Houston ingested cocaine just prior to her death but concluded it wasn't a "fatal dose".

In 2018, her ex-husband Bobby Brown believed Houston's death wasn't drug-related, telling Rolling Stone: "I don’t think she died from drugs. She was really working hard on herself to try to be a sober person and, um... she was a great woman." When asked further what attributed to her death, Brown stated, "Just being broken-hearted."

== Bibliography ==
- Ammons, Kevin; Bacon, Nancy (1998). Good Girl, Bad Girl: An Insider's Biography of Whitney Houston. Secaucus, NJ: Carol Publ. Group. ISBN 978-0-8065-8012-8.
- Bowman, Jeffrey (1994). Diva: The Totally Unauthorized Biography of Whitney Houston. HarperCollins. ISBN 978-1-52474-284-3.
- Crawford, Robyn (2019). A Song for You: My Life with Whitney Houston. Dutton. ISBN 978-1-52474-284-3.
- Houston, Cissy; Singer, Jonathan (1998). How Sweet the Sound: My Life with God and Gospel. Doubleday. ISBN 978-0-38549-010-8.
- Houston, Cissy (2013). Remembering Whitney: My Story of Love, Loss, and the Night the Music Stopped. HarperCollins. ISBN 978-0-06-223839-9.
- Kennedy, Gerrick (2022). Didn't We Almost Have It All: In Defense of Whitney Houston. Abrams. ISBN 978-1-4197-4969-8.
- Parish, James Robert (2003). Whitney Houston: The Unauthorized Biography. Aurum Press. ISBN 1-85410-921-9.
- Seal, Richard (1994). One Moment in Time: Whitney Houston. Britannia Press Publishing. ISBN 0-9519937-8-X.
- Walden, Narada Michael (2012). Whitney Houston: The Voice, The Music, The Inspiration. Insight Editions. ISBN 978-1-608-87200-8.
