= Stella Foster =

American journalist

- Born: August 6
- Education: Calumet High School
- Occupations: Journalist, columnist and secretary
- Years active: 1969-2012 (43 years)
- Employer: Chicago Sun-Times
- Known for: Stella's Column (Chicago Sun-Times)

Stella Foster is an African-American journalist for the Chicago Sun-Times who was first an assistant for the newspaper entertainment columnist, Irv Kupcinet, before establishing her own columns with Sister 2 Sister magazine and later for her employer.

== Personal ==
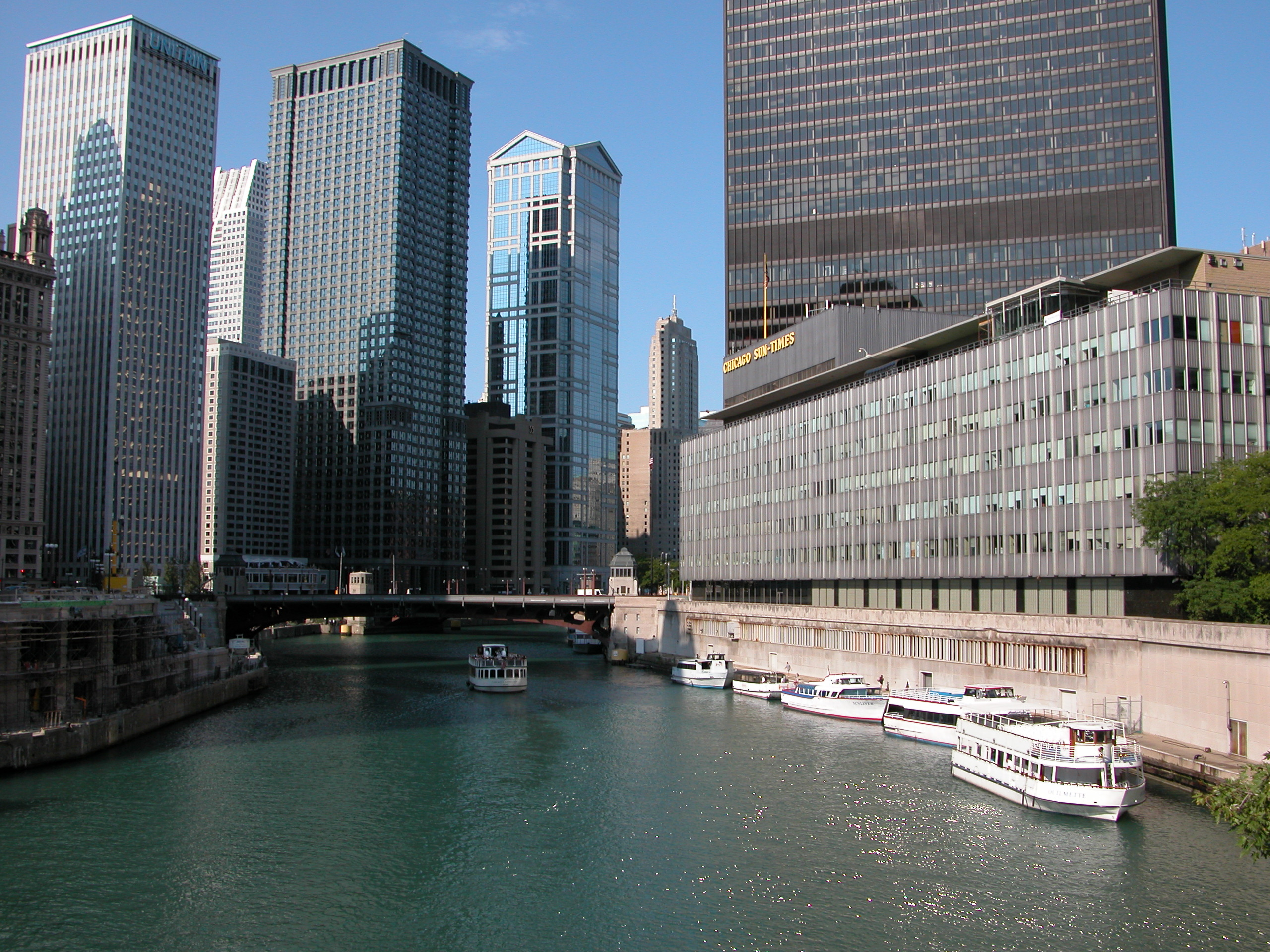
Stella Foster was a journalist with the Chicago Sun-Times (pictured) before her retirement.

Stella Foster is from Chicago, Illinois, and she grew up in the Englewood Community. Her parents Peter James and Mamie Lee Foster were storekeepers. Stella's sister is Jamie Foster Brown, publisher and owner of Sister 2 Sister magazine. She attended Calumet High School.

== Career ==
Over the course of her 43-year career as a Chicago journalist, Foster was an assistant to Irv Kupcinet and a Chicago Sun-Times columnist and broadcaster. Stella Foster's career started when her sister brought to her attention that Kupcinet, the Chicago Sun-Times columnist, was in need of a secretary. She began working for him on September 1, 1969 and was his assistant for decades. Kupcinet taught her the basics of good journalism, and she said his integrity and personality contributed to their getting "scoops" through a hot line where people could call in news. As Kupcinet aged, Foster collaborated with him and she later received a byline under the Kupcinet column. She began her writing career in the mid-1980s with a regular column, "Starlights by Stella", that appeared in Sister 2 Sister magazine; started her own column, "Stella's Column", for the Chicago Sun-Times on December 2, 2003 and after the death of Kupcinet, and retired on her birthday August 6, 2012. During her career, she also had a regular television segment on FOX News called "Stella Sez." The column for the Chicago Sun-Times ran two times a week and was later increased to five times a week. Her employer did not name a successor.

== Notable works of journalism ==
=== Obama Kids ===
Interviewed on CNN defending the Obama kids about letting them speak out for the first time.

=== In popular culture ===
In the 1990s, Foster had contributed some editorials to the Chicago Sun-Times, such as her 1992 opinion piece "Killing By Blacks Must Stop," about urban black violence that was motivated by the shooting of her nephew, who survived the incident. She later continued this opinion format and called them "Stellatorials."

== Awards ==
Stella Foster has won numerous awards, including the Irv Kupcinet Media Giant Award, named after her mentor:

- "Promises Fulfilled Award" from South Central Community Services
- Communications Award from the 100 Black Men of Chicago
- Chicago Journalists Association's Lifetime Achievement Award
- The Chicago Latino Network's Platinum Communications Award
- A. Philip Randolph Pullman Porter Gentle Warrior Award
- National Association of Black Journalists’ Distinguished Service Award
- Rainbow PUSH Media Trailblazer Award
- Archibald Motley Excellence in Arts Award, from the Englewood Committee
- Mt. Sinai's Parenting Institute's African Village Award (which she shared with her family)
- Torch for Journalism from Sigma Gamma Rho sorority
- “Making A Difference Award” from Rainbow PUSH Coalition as a Woman of Distinction
- State of Illinois African American Media Award from the Secretary of State's Office
- African-American History Service Award from Sixth Grace Presbyterian Church
- Joint Civic Committee of Italian American's coveted Dante media award
- "Shero" Award for Career Achievement from NABFEME
- She has been saluted by the Midwest Radio and Music Association, hailed as a “Phenomenal Woman” by the Expo for Today's Black Woman, and named one of The “100 Woman Making a Difference” by Today's Chicago Woman Magazine.
- She received the Each One Teach One Literacy's Englewood Community Award for Excellence in Journalism, and has earned awards from the Chicago Black Public Relations Society and from the National Council of Negro Women

== See also ==
- Jamie Foster Brown, sister
