= Jamie Foster Brown =

African American publisher

- Born: Jamie Foster ca. June 26, 1946 (age 80); Chicago, Illinois
- Education: Calumet High School (Chicago)
- Alma mater: Stockholm University
- Occupations: Magazine owner and publisher, entertainment columnist and journalist, former TV producer
- Years active: Publisher, 1988-present
- Known for: Pioneering publisher in the African American community
- Title: Dr. (Bennett College, honorary doctoral degree, 2008)
- Spouse: Dr. Lorenzo Brown (m. 1970)
- Children: 2 sons

Jamie Foster Brown (ca. June 26, 1946) is the former owner and publisher of Sister 2 Sister magazine, which ran from 1988 to 2014. Newsweek called it the "African-American version of People magazine." As an entertainment journalist, Brown wrote a regular column in her magazine, called "Meow", and through it and her interviews with celebrities, she became the first nationally known black female gossip columnist.

== Personal ==
Jamie Foster Brown's hometown is Chicago, Illinois. She and her sister Stella Foster were raised in an Englewood, Chicago neighborhood. Her parents, Peter James and Mamie Lee Foster, were neighborhood storekeepers. Brown was educated at Calumet High School, started college in Chicago, and later transferred and then graduated with a B.A. from Stockholm University.

Her sister Stella Foster also wrote for Sister 2 Sister magazine. She worked with Irv Kupcinet, an entertainment journalist at the Chicago Sun-Times, and after his death wrote her own column and retired in 2012.

Brown was married to Dr. Lorenzo Brown, a former economist, from 1970 until his death in 2015. The family made Stockholm, Sweden their home for nine years while the couple had two sons, Randy and Russell, and Foster attended university. Randy was wounded by gunfire in 1992 when he was 17 years old, and Foster appeared on NBC's America the Violent with Tom Brokaw to discuss the issue of violence from a parent's perspective. Her husband and two sons worked for the magazine.

== Career ==
Brown once worked with the Chicago-based Zenith Radio Company.

In 1979, Brown started a ticket company, Washington Theater Group. She then worked for Robert Johnson's Black Entertainment Television (BET), first in advertising as a secretary, later being promoted to a TV producer for Video Soul and Video LP programs. She left the network in 1987. As a TV producer, Brown had met musical talent, such as Whitney Houston and others, and would later use her contacts for her entertainment reporting. Brown has said in interviews that she is not a writer but an interviewer and storyteller, and she wanted to write stories about how celebrities were made. She formed the idea for her own magazine while writing for Impact magazine and other publications.

Brown has owned and published Sister 2 Sister magazine since its launch in 1988. The magazine was published from Lanham, Maryland and later from Takoma Park, Maryland. Expanding on the brand, Brown created and serves as an entertainment journalist for the syndicated radio program Sister 2 Sister Celebrity Update. While at Sister 2 Sister, Brown was a regular guest on the Joan Rivers Show and the Tom Joyner Morning Show.

== Notable works of journalism ==
Brown is known for interviewing her subjects in-depth, and for not presenting black celebrities as superficial.

She is known for her interview that appeared in Sister 2 Sister magazine with former Washington, D.C. mayor Marion S. Barry. In the interview, Barry discusses how he has handled the mix of power and women.

Brown has reported about the musical group Milli Vanilli's lip syncing recordings and performances.

In 2008, a judge ordered rap artist DMX to pay 1.5 million to Monique Wayne because of a comment he had made to Brown in a 2006 interview for Sister 2 Sister magazine alleging that a woman had raped him and given birth to his child. Wayne's original suit was for "defamation, false statements and 'unreasonable publicity' about her private life".

Brown was interviewed about Michael Jackson, and said that his children were well-adjusted and that Jackson seemed like a good father to her.

== In popular culture ==
Brown appeared on the cover of the November 2013 issue of Sister 2 Sister magazine as it celebrated its 25th anniversary, and was interviewed.

== Awards ==
- Midwest Radio and Music Association's Lifetime Achievement Award, 1998
- National Association of Black Female Executives in Music & Entertainment, Shero Hall of Fame, 2002 inductee
- Golden Scissors (black hair style), Lifetime Achievement Award, 2002
- Association for Women in Communications, Matrix Award for Professional Achievement, 2004
- Bennett College, honorary doctorate, 2008
- Ford Motor Co., Freedom Sisters Award, 2009
- T.H.E. B.L.A.C.K.W.O.O.D Worldwide - Matriarch Pioneer of Jubilee 2024
- Cafe Mocha Radio - 2014 Trailblazer Award
- Legendary Awards - Media Icon Award 2013

== Selected writings ==
- Shabazz, Betty, and Jamie Foster Brown. 1998. Betty Shabazz: a sisterfriends' tribute in words and pictures. New York: Simon & Schuster.
