= Sister 2 Sister =

American women's magazine (1988–2014)

- Categories: African Americans, women
- Frequency: Monthly
- Publisher: Jamie Foster Brown
- Founder: Jamie Foster Brown
- Founded: 1988
- Final issue: 2014
- Country: United States
- Based in: Washington, D.C.
- Language: English
- Website: Website
- ISSN: 1071-5053
- OCLC: 27255689

Sister 2 Sister was a monthly U.S. four-color women's magazine devoted to the world of African-American entertainment. Reportedly described as "the African American version of People Magazine", the publication was in circulation between 1988 and 2014.

== History and profile ==
Sister 2 Sister was established in 1988. Jamie Foster Brown was the founder and publisher. In October 2014 the magazine ceased publication and went online. It has since gone offline.
