= John Houston (manager) =

American talent manager and father of Whitney Houston (1920–2003)

- Born: John Russell Houston Jr. September 13, 1920; Trenton, New Jersey, U.S.
- Died: February 2, 2003 (aged 82); Manhattan, New York, U.S.
- Burial place: Fairview Cemetery, Westfield, New Jersey
- Occupation: Talent manager
- Years active: 1959–2002
- Spouse: Elsie Hamilton (m. 1942; div. 1964) Emily "Cissy" Drinkard (m. 1964; div. 1991) Barbara Peggy Houston (m. 1992)

John Russell Houston Jr. (September 13, 1920 – February 2, 2003) was a theatrical and talent manager best known as the father of American singer and actress Whitney Houston and her manager between 1989 and 2002 and the ex-husband of American gospel and soul singer Cissy Houston. Born in Trenton, New Jersey and raised in Newark, after meeting Cissy in the late 1950s, he began his career as a manager, first overseeing the career of the session vocal group the Gospelaires, which included his nieces-in-law Dionne and Dee Dee. Cissy joined the group in 1961, following Dionne Warwick's exit to begin a solo career and she later founded the American R&B and gospel group the Sweet Inspirations, to which Houston also managed between 1967 and 1969, until Cissy left the group to begin a solo career, which Houston also managed.

Starting in 1981, Houston began getting involved in his daughter Whitney's burgeoning career. Following the success of Whitney Houston's debut album, his daughter made him the president and CEO of her management company, Nippy Inc. in late 1986. Three years later, he was appointed as Whitney's manager, a position he held until 2002. Houston had a close relationship with his daughter that later fractured after Houston's company John Houston Enterprises sued Whitney for failure in paying the company. Whitney later forgave her father prior to his death in Manhattan after years of battling diabetes and heart disease. He is currently interred at Fairview Cemetery in Westfield, New Jersey next to his daughter Whitney, granddaughter Bobbi Kristina Brown and ex-wife Cissy.

== Early life and career ==
John Russell Houston Jr. was born the eldest of two sons to schoolteacher Sarah Elizabeth (née Collins; 1895–1986) and electrical engineer John Russell Houston Sr. (1896–1973) in Trenton, New Jersey on September 13, 1920. His younger brother, Henry (1923–1989) was born roughly three years after him. Born of African-American heritage, he also had partial Scottish, English, Lenape and Wampanoag descent.

At an early age, the family relocated to the First Ward section of Newark. Houston was the maternal great-grandson of American abolitionist and education advocate Jeremiah Burke Sanderson. Prior to his birth, his father served his country in World War I. As a child, Houston was mentored by American singer and actor Paul Robeson, who was close to paternal members of Houston's family. Robeson was Houston's godfather.

Raised Catholic, Houston attended Seton Hall Preparatory School, an all boys' high school located in the suburban community of West Orange. Following graduation from the school, Houston married his high school sweetheart Elsie Hamilton and was subsequently drafted in the United States Army and served his country during World War II where he fought against Nazi Germany and Italian troops. Following the defeats of Nazi Germany and Italy, Houston was given an honorable discharge around April 1945 just as American troops invaded Japan.

Upon his return, Houston found work as a taxi and truck driver to provide for his and Hamilton's only child together, a son John III (1943–2021).

== Cissy Houston ==
Houston first met Emily Lee "Cissy" Drinkard at the Newark Symphony Hall in the spring of 1958 where Cissy and her gospel singing family group the Drinkard Singers were rehearsing for a televised performance at the venue. Cissy recalled first seeing Houston a decade earlier when he was an Army MP, coming to an apartment building next to her family's "looking for someone who'd gone AWOL".

Despite the fact that both of them were married to their respective spouses, though both of them were split from their spouses, and their 13-year age difference, they became a couple shortly after meeting. They first began living together at Cissy's apartment at Newark's Eighth Street, where John looked after Cissy's son from her first marriage, Gary. By 1959, Houston wanted to enter the music business, feeling he could bring the Drinkard Singers to bigger, more important musical venues though they were quickly thwarted by Cissy's sister Lee Drinkard Warrick.

Undeterred, Houston eventually began managing the career of the group's splinter act, the Gospelaires, which included Cissy's teenage nieces Dionne and Dee Dee Warrick. With Houston's help, the group landed the amateur night competition at Harlem's Apollo Theater, where they won against their competition.

Months later, while opening for the Drinkard Singers at the Apollo, a musician came backstage asking for background singers for a session by American R&B singer Sam "The Man" Taylor, to which Houston and the Gospelaires accepted, starting a career in session vocal work for a range of pop, rock and rhythm and blues acts. Noting how little pay background singers received for participating in recordings, Houston and Dionne Warrick demanded a higher pay, in which they succeeded, leading to constant work backing acts such as the Drifters, Solomon Burke and Little Richard.

In September 1961, Dionne Warrick was discovered by songwriter Burt Bacharach, with whom Warrick was asked to work on various songs by the Shirelles, beginning a decade-long partnership; by the time she released her first hit single, "Don't Make Me Over", Warrick had changed her name to Warwick and became a star shortly afterwards. Houston convinced Cissy to take Dionne's place in a session for rockabilly musician Ronnie Hawkins that month. At the time, Cissy was working at the RCA Electronics plant in nearby Elizabeth. Upon receiving her first paycheck, Cissy embarked on a long career as a session vocalist.

In the same year Cissy's secular career began, she and Houston welcomed their first-born, a son Michael, that August. Two years later, on August 9, 1963, their only daughter Whitney Elizabeth was born. A year later, on May 24, 1964, following Houston's final divorce decree from Elsie Hamilton early in the year, the couple got married, three months before Whitney's first birthday. Following the wedding, the Houstons resettled at what was then a predominantly black working middle-class neighborhood in Newark's Wainwright Street.

As Houston's wife settled on work as a session vocalist for a variety of artists in the New York musical scene, he became a househusband, looking after their three children. When his daughter Whitney was still an infant, Houston gave her the lifelong nickname, "Nippy", based on a mischievous comic book character that was always getting into trouble and mischief.

== The Sweet Inspirations ==
In early 1967, Cissy Houston founded the Sweet Inspirations, a group that consisted of her fellow backing partners Myrna Smith, Sylvia Shemwell and Estelle Brown. The group had been initially nicknamed "The Group" or "Cissy & The Girls" while they backed many artists during the early to mid-1960s. The group signed as a recording act with Atlantic Records that year and were paired up with Aretha Franklin, with whom they backed up on hits such as "(You Make Me Feel Like) A Natural Woman", "Chain of Fools", "I Say a Little Prayer", "Think" and "Ain't No Way", which featured Cissy using her soprano obligatto, which Houston suggested she used to back Franklin on during her first verse. The Sweet Inspirations recorded their debut album and released it that summer. It included their Grammy-nominated top 20 crossover hit, "Sweet Inspiration" and their popular funk-infused cover of Ike Turner's hit "I'm Blue".

By the late summer of 1967, following the devastation of Newark's streets during the Newark race riot, Houston became the Sweet Inspirations' manager and traveled with the group on the road as they began touring the Chitlin' Circuit as Houston and his wife was trying to make enough money to move out of Newark, which was turning into a drug and gang-infested city. The Houston children were left in care of close friends Phyllis Hardaway, who was their primary caretaker, and Ellen "Bae" White during this period.

Like many black artists of the era, the Sweet Inspirations dealt with racial discrimination while touring the Southeastern United States; Houston often demanded the group to enter whites-only establishments to break the racial barriers. In several instances, the group would not be paid by several promoters who would book them for shows, leading Houston to demand they get paid. The group toured Europe in 1968 and 1969, by themselves and by occasionally, backing Aretha Franklin.

In July 1969, Houston convinced Col. Tom Parker, manager of Elvis Presley, to have the Sweet Inspirations sing background for the American singer during his comeback performances in Las Vegas, often performing at the International Hotel. Houston befriended Elvis Presley and called him "Elvis Pretzel" and joked that he could be "part black" due to his movements and singing style. Houston learned about the music business during this period during conversations with Presley's friends.

== Cissy's solo career ==
By October 1969, Cissy, tired of life on the road and being away from her children, decided to leave the group and start a solo career while also making schedules where she would be more attentive to her children. Houston eventually helped Cissy earn her first recording contract as a soloist through a fledgling label called Commonwealth United, where she released her debut album, Presenting Cissy Houston, in June 1970; the album featured the moderate hits "I'll Be There" and "Be My Baby".

Houston remained Cissy's manager throughout this period and by the early 1970s was regularly driving his wife to several New York cabaret and jazz venues where she became a frequenting performer, earning a loyal fan base. During this period, Houston began working in the campaign of Kenneth A. Gibson, who later was elected Newark's first black mayor in 1970. Following Gibson's election win, Houston began working with Gibson as his administrator at Newark's City Hall for extra income.

That summer, the Houstons moved to neighboring East Orange, settling at the suburban area of Dodd Street, nicknamed "Doddtown" by residents. Despite her early success, Cissy struggled with a follow-up. In 1972, she was the original vocalist of Jim Weatherly's country-soul ballad "Midnight Train to Georgia", which had originally been titled "Midnight Plane to Houston" until Houston convinced Weatherly's publishing company to change the title. But the song was only a moderate hit upon its release and a year later became the biggest hit single for Gladys Knight and the Pips.

Houston angrily stated that Cissy's failure to be a crossover pop-soul star was due to both racism and colorism in the music industry. By 1972, Houston's contract was sold to Janus Records, which she recorded with until 1977 when she signed with the local Private Stock label, based in New Jersey and worked with Jersey producer Michael Zager, working with him on three albums within the next three years. Her first album with Zager, a self titled album, would be notable for her gospel-arranged rendition of "Tomorrow", which became her showstopper during live concerts during this period.

== Emergence of Whitney Houston and marital problems ==
Houston was in person at Newark's New Hope Baptist Church in November 1975 when his then 12-year-old daughter Whitney took the stage singing her first solo and was taken away by her voice. In September of the following year, the 56-year-old suffered a near-fatal heart attack after driving his wife to another performing gig in Manhattan. Though he eventually recovered, doctors alarmed Cissy that Houston "wouldn't be the same".

Cissy later recalled that Houston began lashing out at his wife for not "fighting harder" to become a solo star. The verbal arguments deeply affected their children. During this period, the talent of their teenage daughter Whitney had taken shape after Whitney began singing background for Cissy during the cabaret gigs and occasionally taken the lead on some portions, starting at fourteen. By 1980, Whitney began performing more solo numbers and was starting to gain notice in the New York music scene.

Around that same time, Cissy Houston accomplished a disco hit with the song "Think It Over", which briefly revived Cissy's commercial fortunes. However, following daughter Whitney's graduation from Mount Saint Dominic Academy, both Cissy and John put their focus on Whitney's professional career, hiring Tara Productions to manage her career. In 1982, following a final verbal argument that was halted by Whitney's outburst, John and Cissy separated after eighteen years of marriage, but remained married for the next nine years. John Houston then resettled at an apartment suite in Fort Lee, New Jersey.

== Managing Whitney Houston ==
After being scouted by both Elektra Records and CBS Records, Whitney signed a lucrative two-album contract with Arista Records in April 1983. Two years later, her self-titled debut album, Whitney Houston, was released and became a successful recording at the end of the year, with hits such as "Saving All My Love for You", "How Will I Know" and "Greatest Love of All".

By late 1986, Whitney formed her production and management company Nippy Inc., and hired her father to be the president of the company, which would be held near his home in Fort Lee. It was through Houston that Whitney was convinced to buy a mansion in Mendham Township, New Jersey, which Whitney purchased in December 1987. Around the same time, after hearing rumors of his daughter's sexuality due to her close relationship with Robyn Crawford, her personal assistant and later creative director, Houston advised the pair to date men to avoid suspicion, according to Crawford. Crawford later accused Houston of mismanaging his daughter's money.

By 1987, Houston was starting to become more involved in his daughter's career, much to the chagrin of Tara Productions, who ceased working with Whitney in late 1988. Afterwards, Whitney hired John to be her personal manager. Houston soon got his daughter to sign with the William Morris Agency.

During this tenure, John later admitted he could be an "intense manager". John Houston told Ebony magazine in 1990, "I come across to some people as the devil incarnate. I am smart, I learn fast and I'm dedicated to Whitney Houston. It is her career, her money and nobody makes decisions but her." Houston made the cover of the same magazine that June with his daughter under the title, "Whitney Houston's Father's Day Tribute: 'I'll Always Be Daddy's Girl'". In the same interview with the magazine, Whitney admitted, "We've hollered and screamed at each other. But it was always over business. If it were anything else, I would not be screaming at my father . . . I'll never find anyone to love me like my daddy does. I will always be daddy's girl."

Through negotiations with Jim Steeg in 1990, Houston helped to book his daughter to sing "The Star-Spangled Banner" at Super Bowl XXV. When NFL executives feared the recording of Houston's soul-jazz-gospel hybrid rendition would alienate audiences, Steeg asked John Houston if Whitney could re-record the song to which Houston quickly refused. The NFL decided to keep Whitney's original recording. Whitney Houston's live performance of the song at Super Bowl XXV on January 27, 1991 was well received and acclaimed and its recording, released the following February, became a top 20 hit and later went gold, selling half a million copies. In July 2012, it was reported that rapper MC Hammer was encouraged to marry Whitney by John during Super Bowl XXV, despite the fact that Hammer was already a married man with children; Houston and Hammer maintained a friendship until Houston's death. That same year, John and Cissy Houston divorced after 27 years of marriage. A year later, in 1992, Houston married his third wife Barbara, who once worked for his daughter as one of her maids. He subsequently adopted Barbara's daughter Alana from a previous relationship. That same year, Houston walked his daughter Whitney down the aisle to her marriage to singer Bobby Brown. According to Houston's obituary in The Independent, his daughter's marriage to Brown made their own relationship "more fraught".

Houston would remain involved in his daughter's career throughout the 1990s, helping his daughter to secure film roles, including The Bodyguard and Waiting to Exhale.

== Lawsuit against Whitney ==
By the late 1990s, old age, diabetes and heart disease made John Houston less active in his daughter's career. By 2001, he decided to step down as president of Nippy Inc., with his daughter-in-law at the time, Donna, taking his place. That same year, through a company formed by his personal assistant Kevin Skinner named John Houston Enterprises, Houston reportedly helped Whitney negotiate a $100 million contract with Arista, which became one of the most lucrative deals in music history. John Houston stepped down as Whitney's manager in 2002 with another daughter-in-law, Pat, taking his place.

That August, John Houston Enterprises sued Whitney Houston for $100 million for failing to pay the company, claiming not only the negotiations with the Arista contract but also helping out Whitney's personal legal issues, including a marijuana drug bust the previous year at a Hawaiian airport. That December, speaking on the Harvey Levin-produced television program Celebrity Justice from a hospital bed after he fell ill, Houston demanded his daughter to pay him to settle the matter, telling her if she paid him, "you don't have a lawsuit". That same week, Whitney talked about the lawsuit to Diane Sawyer stating that someone was influencing her father to go against her; at one point, an emotional Whitney had to temporarily halt the interview as she broke down over her father.

Whitney Houston later claimed her father was influenced by "people that were lying" and noted they took advantage of her father through his illnesses. Whitney admitted that she stopped speaking to her father during that period but stated that she was still paying the bills for his medical expenses. According to Cissy Houston, she believed Skinner had something to do with the lawsuit and "talked [Houston] into it". After John's brief televised message, his son Michael hired "a guard to stand watch at the door of [Houston's] hospital room."

When Oprah Winfrey asked Whitney if she forgave her father, the singer said "absolutely. I love my dad, and I knew that he was sickly. People were trying to get money from him. Distract me from him."

Whitney further told Winfrey that she visited her father at the hospital weeks before his death and said she was able to mend fences with him, telling him she was gonna take care of him for the rest of his life though the lawsuit was still pending at the time. Two days before his death, during her infamous phone interview with Wendy Williams, Whitney dismissed the lawsuit as "bullshit" when Williams asked if the lawsuit was dropped and the singer reiterated her love for her father, stating, "I love my daddy, my daddy loves me."

== Death and resting place ==
On February 2, 2003, John Russell Houston Jr. died from cardiac arrest at Columbia Presbyterian Hospital (now NewYork-Presbyterian/Columbia University Irving Medical Center) in Manhattan, New York City at the age of 82, due to complications from diabetes and heart disease.

Preceded in death by his brother Henry, father John Sr., and mother Sarah, at the time of his death, he was married to Barbara, and his children were his stepdaughter Alana as well as adopted son Gary Garland, with his biological children being John III, Michael and Whitney.

Because she feared a media spectacle, Whitney told Oprah Winfrey she and her family held a private funeral for Houston while a more public funeral was held days later at St. James' A. M. E. Church in Newark, with Whitney not in attendance.

Many associated with Whitney during this time claimed she never recovered from the death of her father and the lawsuit that preceded his death. In April 2004, the lawsuit his company filed against Whitney was dropped.

Following his funeral, Houston's body was laid to rest at the Fairview Cemetery in Westfield, New Jersey next to his parents and brother. He was joined by daughter Whitney following her own death nine years later in February 2012. Her daughter and Houston's granddaughter Bobbi Kristina Brown was buried there following her death in 2015 and his ex-wife Cissy Houston joined them nine years later in 2024.

== Legacy and depictions in popular culture ==
Shortly after his death, many obituaries cited him for being a manager in "the early days of R&B" and hailed him as an "R&B pioneer". According to Whitney Houston's spokeswoman Nancy Seltzer, Houston was "an uncompromising manager who, for example, insisted while the South was still segregated that his wife and other black clients stay in first-class, white hotels", adding "he was a pioneer in rhythm and blues".

In 2015, James A. Watson Jr. portrayed Houston in the televised biopic, Whitney, directed by actress Angela Bassett.

In 2022, actor Clarke Peters portrayed Houston in the Whitney estate-approved, Clive Davis-produced biopic, Whitney Houston: I Wanna Dance with Somebody.

== Bibliography ==
- Bowman, Jeffrey (1994). Diva: The Totally Unauthorized Biography of Whitney Houston. HarperCollins. ISBN 978-1-52474-284-3.
- Crawford, Robyn (2019). A Song for You: My Life with Whitney Houston. Dutton. ISBN 978-1-52474-284-3.
- Houston, Cissy; Singer, Jonathan (1998). How Sweet the Sound: My Life with God and Gospel. Doubleday. ISBN 978-0-38549-010-8.
- Houston, Cissy (2013). Remembering Whitney: My Story of Love, Loss, and the Night the Music Stopped. HarperCollins. ISBN 978-0-06-223839-9.
- Parish, James Robert (2003). Whitney Houston: The Unauthorized Biography. Aurum Press. ISBN 1-85410-921-9.
