= Cissy Houston Collection =

Compilation album by Cissy Houston
- Released: September 20, 2005
- Recorded: 1995, 1996, 1997 (Hit Factory, NY, BKB Studios, NY)
- Genre: Gospel, R&B
- Length: 1:16:44
- Label: InterSound Music
- Producer: Joel Moss, Jimmy Vivino; Cissy Houston

Cissy Houston chronology
The Definitive Collection (2000)	Cissy Houston Collection (2005)	Walk on By Faith (2012)

The Cissy Houston Collection is a gospel compilation album by American gospel/soul singer Cissy Houston, released on September 20, 2005. The album's tracks were produced by Jimmy Vivino, Joel Moss, along with Cissy Houston. Houston composed all the songs except for "Amazing Grace", "Go Where I Send Thee", and "The Lord Will Make a Way Somehow", which was composed by Reverend Thomas A. Dorsey.

The compilation set is a selection of songs from her albums, Face to Face and He Leadeth Me. Both the albums earned Houston Grammy Awards for Best Traditional Gospel Album two years in a row, in 1997 and 1998.

== Track listing ==
No.	Title	Writer(s)	Length
1.	"The Lord Will Make a Way Somehow"	Rev. Thomas A. Dorsey	4:24
2.	"I'm Somebody"	Cissy Houston	3:49
3.	"Go Where I Send Thee"		3:52
4.	"Something's Bound to Happen"	C. Houston	6:20
5.	"With Out God"	C. Houston	4:56
6.	"Too Close to Heaven"	C. Houston	5:51
7.	"Just Tell Him"	C. Houston	5:00
8.	"Stop, Look and Listen"	C. Houston	5:55
9.	"Father, Son, Holy Ghost Is He"	C. Houston	5:37
10.	"He Changed My Life"	C. Houston	4:59
11.	"Count Your Blessings"	C. Houston	4:46
12.	"Deep River/Campground"	C. Houston	4:56
13.	"Amazing Grace"		4:43
14.	"He is the Music"	C. Houston; Joel Mass	5:15
15.	"Face to Face"	C. Houston	6:21

== Personnel ==
- Organ - Rudy Copeland
- Choir/Chorus - Emma Claire Davis
- Choir/Chorus - Ray Gordon
- Composer - Rev. Thomas A. Dorsey
- Guitar - Jimmy Vivino
- Arranger, Piano - Donnie Harper
- Composer, Engineer, Mixing, Producer - Joel "The Octopus" Moss
- Arranger, Composer, Primary Artist, Producer - Cissy Houston
- Choir/Chorus - Gary Houston, Anita Jackson, Arlene Robinson
- Choir/Chorus - Stewart Ross, Kim Smith, Latasha Spencer, Rebecca King
- Drums - Steve Jordan
- Bass - Will Lee
- Mastered by - Glenn Meadows
- Organ - Leon Pendarvis
- Guest Artist - T.M. Stevens

== Credits ==
- Compendia Music, Distribution
- InterSound Recordings, Inc.
