= Whitney Houston: I Wanna Dance with Somebody =

2022 film by Kasi Lemmons

- Theatrical release poster
- Directed by: Kasi Lemmons
- Written by: Anthony McCarten
- Produced by: Denis O'Sullivan; Jeff Kalligheri; Anthony McCarten; Pat Houston; Clive Davis; Larry Mestel; Molly Smith; Thad Luckinbill; Trent Luckinbill; Matt Jackson; Christina Papagjika; Matthew Salloway
- Starring: Naomi Ackie; Stanley Tucci; Ashton Sanders; Tamara Tunie; Nafessa Williams; Clarke Peters
- Cinematography: Barry Ackroyd
- Edited by: Daysha Broadway
- Music by: Chanda Dancy
- Production companies: TriStar Pictures; Compelling Pictures; Muse of Fire Productions; Primary Wave Entertainment; Black Label Media; West Madison Entertainment
- Distributed by: Sony Pictures Releasing
- Release dates: December 13, 2022 (AMC Lincoln Square); December 23, 2022 (United States)
- Running time: 144 minutes
- Country: United States
- Language: English
- Budget: $45 million
- Box office: $59.8 million

Whitney Houston: I Wanna Dance with Somebody is a 2022 American biographical musical drama film directed by Kasi Lemmons, from a screenplay by Anthony McCarten, based on the life and career of American pop icon and actress Whitney Houston. The film stars Naomi Ackie as Houston with Stanley Tucci, Ashton Sanders, Tamara Tunie, Nafessa Williams, and Clarke Peters in supporting roles.

An authorized biopic on Houston's life was announced in early 2020, with Ackie cast in the lead role that December, and the rest of the cast signing on later the next year. Filming took place in Massachusetts and New Jersey from August to December 2021. The movie's budget was $45 million.

Released in the United States on December 23, 2022, by Sony Pictures Releasing, the film received mixed reviews from critics, with praise going to Ackie's performance and criticisms for the film's length, film editing and use of music biopic conventions. It grossed $59.8 million and later went on to reach number one on Netflix US.

== Plot ==
In 1983, 19-year-old Whitney Houston is coached by her demanding professional singer mother Cissy for a church choir. Her close friendship with Robyn Crawford turns romantic, leading to cohabitation and upsetting Cissy. At the Sweetwaters nightclub, Cissy spots producer Clive Davis in the audience and feigns sickness, forcing Whitney to open with "The Greatest Love of All", which becomes her big break, as he immediately signs her to Arista Records.

Whitney's first major live performance on The Merv Griffin Show with "Home" that June triggers the immense success of her self-titled debut album in 1985. She proposes Robyn be her personal assistant, but John, her overbearing father and self-appointed manager, objects and suggests dating men. After she records a love song with Jermaine Jackson, they start a sexual relationship, angering Robyn. Whitney ends her romantic relationship with her, although they remain close. "I Wanna Dance with Somebody (Who Loves Me)", the lead single from her 1987 sophomore album, cements her crossover success but attracts criticism for selling out and not sounding "black enough". John sets up their own production company, Nippy Inc., and continually asks Whitney to cut ties with Robyn. At the 1988 Soul Train Music Awards, Whitney faces hostility both on the red carpet and when announced as a nominee for Best Music Video. However, she meets singer Bobby Brown, and they soon become engaged.

By the early 1990s Whitney hits her peak period, performing "The Star Spangled Banner" at Super Bowl XXV in 1991 and marking her acting debut in The Bodyguard. She marries Bobby in July 1992, giving birth to their daughter Bobbi Kristina the following March. While on tour to promote the film's soundtrack album, she performs "I Will Always Love You" in South Africa for newly-inaugurated President Nelson Mandela in 1994. After learning that John has withheld her financial and material assets, she returns home and finds Bobby missing. Upon Bobby's return, Whitney accuses him of spending her money on other women, ejects him from their house and consumes heavy amounts of cocaine. Inspired by their tumultuous relationship, she records the ballad "Why Does It Hurt So Bad".

In 1998, Clive pressures Whitney to release her first new studio album in eight years, although she has already released seven major singles from the soundtrack albums to her three films. She confronts John after discovering he mismanaged most of her fortune, forcing her into a $100 million contract with Arista that includes a world tour. Dealing with insomnia and stress, she asks Clive to provide potential songs. Upon finding one she likes, she releases a new studio album, igniting a potential comeback. However, the following tour proves exhausting, and her addiction resumes upon reuniting with Bobby.

Near the tour's end, Robyn implores Whitney to conclude the tour early and return home, but Bobby pushes her to continue; Robyn permanently parts ways with her after revealing John has been hospitalized. While visiting him, Whitney explains that her sister-in-law Pat is her new management. She then proceeds to disown him, even refusing to attend his funeral in 2003. Cissy discovers her in a drug-induced haze and arranges for her arrest to force her into rehab. After a 4-month program, she sobers up, reconnects with her daughter, and divorces Bobby in 2007.

Releasing a new album in 2009 to attempt a second comeback, she performs "I Didn't Know My Own Strength" on The Oprah Winfrey Show. Despite this, her subsequent world tour underperforms when she proves unable to showcase her famed vocal range. On February 11, 2012, at the Beverly Hilton in Los Angeles to perform "Home" at Clive's pre-Grammy party, her bassist Rickey Minor suggests calling the performance off to rest, but she refuses. In her room, she tearfully runs a bath while preparing drugs she had secretly bought earlier, and softly sings "Home" to herself while reminiscing about Robyn and Bobbi Kristina along with her life and career. She unexpectedly perishes soon after.

A flashback to the 1994 American Music Awards portrays her receiving a standing ovation following a medley of "I Loves You, Porgy", "And I Am Telling You I'm Not Going", and "I Have Nothing".

== Cast ==
- Naomi Ackie as Whitney Houston
- Stanley Tucci as Clive Davis
- Ashton Sanders as Bobby Brown
- Tamara Tunie as Cissy Houston
- Nafessa Williams as Robyn Crawford
- Clarke Peters as John Houston
- Dave Heard as Rickey Minor
- Bria Danielle Singleton as Bobbi Kristina Brown
- Jaison Hunter as Jermaine Jackson

== Production ==
On April 22, 2020, Stella Meghie was set to direct a Whitney Houston biopic, titled I Wanna Dance with Somebody, with Anthony McCarten attached to pen the screenplay and produce the film along with Clive Davis, Pat Houston, Larry Mestel, Denis O'Sullivan and Jeff Kalligheri. McCarten, who self-financed an option for Houston's life rights, wrote the script on spec, and lined up rights and music. On August 4, 2020, TriStar Pictures acquired the film. On September 1, 2021, Kasi Lemmons took over directing duties from Meghie who eventually served as an executive producer.

On December 15, 2020, Naomi Ackie was set to portray Houston. In September 2021, Ashton Sanders was cast as Bobby Brown, Houston's husband of fifteen years. The same month, Stanley Tucci was cast as Clive Davis. In October 2021, Clarke Peters and Tamara Tunie were cast in the film, and Nafessa Williams was cast as Robyn Crawford, replacing Moses Ingram. Williams previously played another character in a 2015 television film entitled Whitney.

The film was expected to begin principal photography on August 9, 2021, in Newark, New Jersey, and Boston, Massachusetts, according to one source. In August 2021, Compelling Pictures was in pre-production on the film at Marina Studios in Boston. In October and November, scenes were shot in Arlington, Massachusetts, as well as at Worcester Regional Airport, Wang Theater, Cutler Majestic Theatre and Gillette Stadium.

=== Music ===
The soundtrack was released by RCA Records on December 16, 2022. It includes two hours of remixed and original versions of Houston's songs, with guest features by BeBe Winans, Clean Bandit, Kygo, Lucky Daye, SG Lewis, Samaria, Jax Jones, Leikeli47, P2J, Oxlade, and Pheelz. Ackie lip-synched to Houston's songs, though she does her own singing in a few early scenes.

== Release ==
The film had its world premiere at the AMC Lincoln Square in New York City in December 13, 2022, and was released theatrically on December 23, 2022 by Sony Pictures Releasing.

The film was released for VOD on February 7, 2023, followed by a Blu-ray and DVD release on February 28, 2023.

The film was confirmed to begin streaming on Netflix US in April 2023, though it had started in India in February of that year, and as late as September 2025 for other regions of the world.

== Reception ==
=== Box office ===
Whitney Houston: I Wanna Dance With Somebody grossed $23.7 million in the United States and Canada, and $36.1 million in other territories, for a worldwide total of $59.8 million.

In the United States and Canada, I Wanna Dance With Somebody was released alongside Babylon, and was initially projected to gross $20–25 million from 3,625 theaters over its four-day opening weekend. Deadline cited the threat of a tripledemic surge in COVID-19 and flu cases and the nationwide impact of Winter Storm Elliott as reasons for lower-than-expected theater attendance. The film made $1.9 million on its first day. It went on to debut to $4.7 million in its opening weekend (and a total of $6.4 million over the four days), finishing third behind Avatar: The Way of Water and Puss in Boots: The Last Wish. The film held well in its second weekend, dropping just 16 percent to $3.9 million, finishing in fourth.

In the United Kingdom, Whitney Houston: I Wanna Dance with Somebody debuted in second place, behind Avatar: The Way of Water. The film grossed £3.3 million ($3.9 million) in its opening weekend. It held its place of second the following week, grossing £1.3 million for a total of £6.2 million ($7.5 million).

The film peaked at number one on Netflix US, number two globally and the UK.

=== Critical response ===
On the review aggregator website Rotten Tomatoes, 43% of 136 critics' reviews are positive, with an average rating of 5.3/10. The website's consensus reads: "Another wiki-biopic for posterity's sake, the relatively watchable I Wanna Dance with Somebody leaves you feeling like you were on stage with Whitney Houston, but didn't really get to dance with her." Metacritic, which uses a weighted average, assigned the film a score of 51 out of 100, based on 44 critics, indicating "mixed or average" reviews. Audiences polled by CinemaScore gave the film an average grade of "A" on an A+ to F scale, while PostTrak reported 88% of audience members gave the film a positive score, with 68% saying they would definitely recommend it.

Ackie received praise for her performance. Critics commended Lemmons for not putting the focus on Houston's downfall, and instead foregrounding who Houston was before fame, particularly her relationship with Robyn Crawford. Stephanie Zacharek of Time commented, "Lemmons is more interested in the root of Houston's tragedy than its expression, anyway. At one point, Whitney laments that it's her job to 'be everything to everyone.'"

Zacharek said the film succeeds in its display of "Houston's exuberant contradictions, and the joy she both took and gave in performing. The movie isn't a melodramatic tell-all, or a total downer. But it manages, even while being unapologetically entertaining, to feel like an honest reckoning with all the things we didn't want to know about Houston at her fame's height. It's a film that takes our failings into consideration, rather than simply fixating on hers, a summation of all the things she tried to tell us and couldn't." Others, like Michael Talbot-Haynes of Film Threat, believed the film should have shown the full scope of Houston's struggles with substance abuse.

Michael Phillips of the Chicago Tribune reviewed the film positively and said: "A sexually fluid superstar with deep roots in Christianity and the bad luck of falling prey to manipulators and users within her family circle never had a fighting chance at inner peace. 'I Wanna Dance with Somebody' manages to suggest some nuance and ambiguity in Houston's key relationships, and within her own ambitions. The actors and director Lemmons accomplish what the screenplay does only partially: make us believe the circumstances and the behavior. Ashton Sanders' Bobby Brown gives us the weasel but also the man. In a role slightly larger than required, I think, Arista legend Davis has the bonus of being played by ever-wry, ever-winning Stanley Tucci."

Criticisms included those of the screenplay, with some contending it felt like it was ticking off boxes on a music biopic checklist. Brian Truitt of USA Today opined the film felt like a "Wikipedia entry come to life." Another criticism was that some characters did not feel fully fleshed out.

=== Accolades ===
The film was nominated for Outstanding Supporting Visual Effects in a Photoreal Feature at the 21st Visual Effects Society Awards. Naomi Ackie was nominated for the EE Rising Star award for I Wanna Dance with Somebody at the 76th British Academy Film Awards. It was nominated for Outstanding Achievement in Music Editing – Feature Motion Picture at the 70th Motion Picture Sound Editors' Golden Reel Awards. Kasi Lemmons was nominated for Outstanding Directing in a Motion Picture for I Wanna Dance with Somebody at the 54th NAACP Image Awards.

In 2023, the film was nominated for Best Movie at the 23rd BET Awards 2023. According to Billboard, it is one of the highest grossing music biopics of all time.
