= Midnight Train to Georgia (album) =

Studio album by Cissy Houston
- Released: April 25, 1995 (U.S.)
- Recorded: 1970, 1971, 1973, 1975
- Genres: Gospel, R&B, soul, pop
- Length: 49:54
- Label: Ichiban Records
- Producers: Bob Finiz, Charles Koppelman, Donald Rubin, Donald Rubin; Bert DeCoteaux, Cissy Houston, Sonny Limbo, Don Davis

Cissy Houston chronology
I'll Take Care of You (1992)	Midnight Train to Georgia (1995)	Face to Face (1996)

Midnight Train to Georgia is a compilation album by American soul singer Cissy Houston, released in 1995 on Ichiban Records. The album consist of songs recorded when she was on the Janus Records label, which released her debut album, Presenting Cissy Houston, as well as bonus tracks.

The songs were produced by Donald Rubin, Charles Koppelman, Bob Finz, Sonny Limbo, Don Davis and Cissy Houston. Featured tracks include the album's hit singles "Be My Baby" and "I'll Be There"; cover songs "I Just Don't Know What to Do with Myself", "He-I Believe", and her version of "Midnight Train to Georgia", which was later covered by Gladys Knight & the Pips.

The album's liner notes includes special messages from her daughter, American pop/R&B singer Whitney Houston and American R&B singer Luther Vandross.

== Track listing ==
No.	Title	Writer(s)	Length
1.	"I Just Don't Know What to Do with Myself"	Burt Bacharach, Hal David	5:06
2.	"Didn't We"	Jimmy Webb	3:35
3.	"I'll Be There"	Bobby Darin	2:45
4.	"Any Guy"	Melanie Safka	3:35
5.	"When Something Is Wrong with My Baby"	Isaac Hayes, David Porter	3:20
6.	"Be My Baby"	Phil Spector, Ellie Greenwich, Jeff Barry	3:58
7.	"This Empty Place"	Burt Bacharach, Hal David	2:28
8.	"The Long and Winding Road"	John Lennon, Paul McCartney	5:55
9.	"He-I Believe"	Al Stillman, Ervin Drake, Irvin Graham, Jack Richards, Jimmy Shirl, Richard Mullan	3:20
10.	"Darling, Take me Back"	Larry Weiss	2:47
11.	"Hang On To A Dream"	Tim Hardin	2:13
12.	"I Love You"	Ed Townsend	3:15
13.	"Making Love"	Myrna Merch, Bert Keyes	2:58
14.	"It's Not Easy"	Mann, Well	2:44
15.	"Midnight Train To Georgia"	Jim Weatherly	3:59
16.	"Will You Still Love Me Tomorrow"	Gerry Goffin, Carole King	3:30
17.	"Only Time You Say You Love Me"	Philip Mitchell	3:46
18.	"I'm So Glad I Can Love Again"	Norma Toney	3:44
19.	"Nothing Can Stop Me"	Tony Hester	4:43
20.	"Don't Wonder Why"	Leonard Caston	3:16
21.	"Down in the Boondocks"	Joe South	2:12

== Personnel ==
- Producers: Charles Koppelman, Donald Rubin, Donald Rubin
  Bert DeCoteaux, Cissy Houston, Sonny Limbo, Don Davis, Bob Finz

== Credits ==
- Ichiban Records Distribution
