= The Houstons: On Our Own =

- Genre: Documentary
- Starring: Bobbi Kristina Brown; Cissy Houston; Gary Houston; Pat Houston; Rayah Houston
- Country of origin: United States
- Original language: English
- No. of seasons: 1
- No. of episodes: 14

Production
- Executive producers: Gena McCarthy; Julie Insogna-Jarrett; Noah Pollack; Pat Houston; Rob Sharenow; Seth Jarrett; Tracey Baker Simmons; Wanda Shelley
- Running time: 20–22 minutes
- Production company: Jarrett Creative Group

Original release
- Network: Lifetime
- Release: October 24, 2012 – February 13, 2013

The Houstons: On Our Own is an American reality documentary television series that premiered on October 24, 2012, on Lifetime. The series was announced on May 11, 2012, with the working title of The Houston Family Chronicles and was to have ten episodes. The Houstons: On Our Own chronicles the lives of Whitney Houston's family as they move on from her death. It ran for 14 episodes.

== Cast ==
- Bobbi Kristina Brown: Whitney and Bobby Brown's daughter
- Cissy Houston: Whitney's mother
- Gary Houston: Whitney's older brother
- Rayah Houston: Pat and Gary's daughter
- Pat Houston: Whitney's sister-in-law, manager, and Krissy's guardian
- Nick Gordon: Bobbi Kristina's partner

== Episodes ==
No.	Title	Original release date	U.S. viewers (millions)
1	"100 White Roses"	October 24, 2012	1.333
The Houston family comes together for their first Mother's Day without Whitney. Bobbi Kristina announces some shocking news.
2	"Houston, We've Got a Problem"	October 31, 2012	1.313
Pat attempts to get Bobbi Kristina more involved with the family and starting her own career but there are some problems that need to be worked out first.
3	"Nothing Saint About Simon"	November 7, 2012	0.722
Pat and Bobbi Kristina take a trip out of town for a girls weekend getaway. Ray and Gary talk to Nick about responsibility.
4	"Too Little, Too Late"	November 14, 2012	0.689
Pat and the family fly to Los Angeles for BET's tribute to Whitney.
5	"Moving Pieces"	November 21, 2012	0.723
Pat and Nick work to help Bobbi Kristina lift her spirits. Pat and Gary play a game of basketball.
6	"Cupcakes for Krissy"	November 28, 2012	0.889
Pat reaches out to Bobbi Kristina's godmother, CeCe Winans, to invite her over for dinner. Bobbi Kristina is confronted by her cousin due to her outrageous behavior.
7	"A Cabin in the Mountains"	December 5, 2012	0.933
The Houstons attend a spiritual retreat but chaos ensues when a member of the family is rushed to the emergency room.
8	"Calling All Houston's"	December 12, 2012	0.675
The family realizes how important each other are after the recent hospital scare. Pat attempts to strengthen her bond with Bobbi Kristina.
9	"Guess Who's Coming to Dinner"	December 19, 2012	0.710
Bobbi Kristina isolates herself from the family while getting her career together.
10	"All That Sparkles"	December 26, 2012	0.981
The family flies to Los Angeles to attend the debut of Sparkle.
11	"A Houston Family Vacation"	January 23, 2013	1.078
Pat gets the family together again for a spiritual retreat in Hawaii. While in Hawaii, island natives perform a ceremony to assist the family in moving on.
12	"We Are Family"	January 30, 2013	1.022
Bobbi Kristina goes apartment hunting. Gary comes to terms with his declining health and promises to improve himself.
13	"New Beginnings: Part 1"	February 6, 2013	1.137
Bobbi Kristina and Nick host a housewarming party. Bobbi Kristina later informs Nick that he's not the only man she is seeing.
14	"New Beginnings: Part 2"	February 13, 2013	1.059
The family is unsure of Pat's plans for Bobbi Kristina's career.

== Critical reception ==
The show was met with mixed or average reviews with a score of 43 out of 100 on Metacritic based on 7 reviews. The New York Daily News said that the show does not have any kind of effect the viewers might want, at least at first. The Los Angeles Times said the show is intrusive and also uncomfortable.
