= I'll Take Care of You =

I'll Take Care of You may refer to:

- "I'll Take Care of You" (song), a 1959 song by Bobby Bland, which has been covered by several artists
- I'll Take Care of You (Chuck Jackson and Cissy Houston album), a 1992 album
- I'll Take Care of You (Mark Lanegan album), a 1999 album
- "I'll Take Care of You", a 1998 song by the Chicks
- "I'll Take Care of You", a 2025 song by Tyler, the Creator

== See also ==
- "I'll Take Care of U", a Jamie xx remix of Gil Scott-Heron's version of "I'll Take Care of You" by Bobby Bland
