= I Believe (Frankie Laine song) =

1953 song

Song
- Written: 1952
- Genre: Traditional pop
- Songwriters: Ervin Drake; Irvin Graham; Jimmy Shirl; Al Stillman

"I Believe" is a popular song written by Ervin Drake, Irvin Abraham (as "Irvin Graham"), Jack Mendelsohn (as "Jimmy Shirl") and Al Stillman in 1952. The most popular version was recorded by American singer Frankie Laine. Laine's version was especially popular in the United Kingdom, where it remained at the top of the UK Singles Chart for 18 non-consecutive weeks and is Britain's second longest-running number one song of all time.

== Background ==
"I Believe" was commissioned and introduced by Jane Froman on her television show, and became the first hit song ever introduced on television. Froman, troubled by the outbreak of the Korean War in 1950, asked Drake, Graham, Shirl and Stillman to compose a song that would offer hope and faith to the populace. They completed the song in the fall of 1952. Froman's commercial recording reached No. 11 in the Billboard charts during a 10-week stay. "I Believe" has been recorded by many others, and has become both a popular and religious standard.

== Frankie Laine recording ==
"I Believe"

Single by Frankie Laine with Paul Weston and his Orchestra
- B-side: "Your Cheatin' Heart"
- Published: 6 February 1953
- Released: 30 January 1953
- Recorded: 8 January 1953
- Studio: Radio Recorders, Hollywood
- Genre: Ballad, traditional pop
- Length: 2:09
- Label: Columbia Records
- Songwriters: Ervin Drake, Irvin Graham, Jimmy Shirl and Al Stillman
- Producer: Mitch Miller

Frankie Laine's original version was recorded for Columbia Records on 8 January 1953 at Radio Recorders in Hollywood. It featured Paul Weston and his Orchestra accompanying Laine.

In the United Kingdom, Laine's recording spent 18 non-consecutive weeks at the top of the UK Singles Chart. This remained the longest stint of any song at number one on the UK Singles Chart for 73 years until July 2026 when the record was broken by Sam Fender and Olivia Dean's "Rein Me In". "I Believe" was the best-selling single of 1953 in the UK, spending 36 weeks on the chart. It entered the listings on 3 April 1953, and first reached No. 1 in its fourth week on chart, spending nine weeks at the top. On 26 June, it was replaced at No. 1 for a week by "I'm Walking Behind You" by Eddie Fisher featuring Sally Sweetland, but returned to the top spot on 3 July for another six weeks. On 14 August, it was again replaced at the top for a week, this time by Mantovani's "Song From the Moulin Rouge". On 21 August, "I Believe" returned to No. 1 for its final run at the top, for three weeks, bringing its total time at No. 1 to eighteen weeks. Laine also had the most successful version in the US, where his recording reached No. 2, staying there for three weeks.

Laine would later re-record the song for other labels on a number of occasions. The first of these was on December 18, 1964 in Hollywood, with orchestra arranged and conducted by Ralph Carmichael. The recording was released on the Capitol album I Believe the following year. A recording made by Laine on February 25, 1970 for Amos Records in Hollywood, with orchestra arranged by Jimmie Haskell, was issued on the album Frankie Laine's Greatest Hits that year. In June 1977, with Pete Moore's Orchestra and Ray Barr on piano, Laine recorded "I Believe" for a fourth label. This version was included on the Polydor album 20 Memories in Gold, an album largely consisting of re-recordings of his earlier hits, which was released in September that year. In May 1980, Laine recorded "I Believe" at a session of his hit re-recordings used by K-Tel. The recordings were backed by an orchestra conducted by Don Jackson with The Worlettes, and released on the 1982 album The Music Of Frankie Laine. "I Believe" was also recorded as part of a different collection of Laine hit remakes in January 1982, again with the Don Jackson Orchestra. This album, The World Of Frankie Laine, was released by Ronco the same year. In all, Laine recorded "I Believe" for six different record companies over a period spanning from 1953 to 1982.

== Contemporary chart performance and recordings ==
In the US, only the versions by Froman and Laine charted, whilst only Laine's charted in the UK. It was commonplace at the time for multiple artists to record versions of a new song, and others were released. In the UK, "I Believe" entered the sheet music sales chart on 11 April 1953, and reached No. 1 on 13 June, its tenth week on chart. It spent a week at the top, and returned on 24 October for another week, with a total of two weeks at No. 1 on the sheet music chart.

The Frankie Laine version was the first to be issued in the UK, in February 1953. April saw recordings by Jane Froman, Ronnie Ronalde and David Whitfield. Subsequent releases were of versions by Eve Boswell, Allan Jones, Victor Silvester and his Ballroom Orchestra, and Ethel Smith (organ). The song spent forty weeks on the sheet music sales chart, whilst Laine's recording was on the singles chart for 36 weeks.

== Other notable recordings ==
- 1953: David Whitfield recorded the song in 1953, and again in 1960, peaking at No.49 on the UK Singles Chart
- 1953: Perry Como — I Believe ~ Songs of All Faiths Sung by Perry Como
- 1953: Mahalia Jackson — a single release, later on the album The World's Greatest Gospel Singer (1956)
- 1957: Elvis Presley — on his EP Peace in the Valley (Later on the album Elvis' Christmas Album [1957])
- 1958: Jimmie Rodgers — on the album The Number One Ballads
- 1960: Andy Williams — on his album The Village of St. Bernadette
- 1960: Brook Benton & Dinah Washington — on their album Two of Us
- 1961: Johnnie Ray & Timi Yuro — a single release
- 1964: Pat Boone — The Lord's Prayer (And Other Great Hymns)
- 1964: The Bachelors took the song to the No. 2 spot in the UK; also peaked at No. 33 on the U.S. Hot 100
- 1965: The Earls — on the album Remember Me
- 1966: The Righteous Brothers - on the album Go Ahead and Cry
- 1967: Reparata and the Delrons — 45 RPM single Mala 573
- 1967: Tom Jones — Tom Jones Live! At the Talk of the Town
- 1968: Louis Armstrong — on his album I Will Wait for You
- 1970: Cissy Houston — on her album Presenting Cissy Houston
- 1970: Glen Campbell — for his album Oh Happy Day
- 1981: B. J. Thomas — on his album Amazing Grace
- 1982: Gladys Knight & the Pips — on their album That Special Time of Year
- 1995: Robson & Jerome's version reached number one in the UK
- 1997: Barbra Streisand — in a medley with "You’ll Never Walk Alone" on her album Higher Ground
- 1997: Daniel O'Donnell — I Believe
- 2000: Gary Valenciano on his album Revive
- 2007: Rhydian Roberts on his album Rhydian

== Quodlibet with Ave Maria ==
In 1972, Shawnee Music published a new arrangement of "I Believe" that includes a quodlibet with Bach/Gounod, "Ave Maria". This version is frequently performed by choirs at Christmas time.
