= He Leadeth Me =

He Leadeth Me may refer to:

- "He Leadeth Me" (hymn), a hymn by Joseph Henry Gilmore
- He Leadeth Me (album), an album by Cissy Houston
- He Leadeth Me (Pat Boone album), an album by Pat Boone
