= The Definitive Collection (Cissy Houston album) =

Studio album by Cissy Houston
- Released: September 25, 2000
- Recorded: 1977, 1978
- Studio: Columbia Recording Studios, NY; Secret Sound Studies, NY
- Genre: Soul, R&B, Disco, Pop
- Length: 1:14:17
- Label: Connoisseur Records
- Producer: Michael Zager

Cissy Houston chronology
He Leadeth Me (1997)	The Definitive Collection (2000)	Love is Holding You (2001)

The Definitive Collection: Cissy Houston is a compilation album by American soul/gospel singer Cissy Houston, released in the U.S. and UK in 2000. It consist primarily of songs from two Houston albums, 1977's Cissy Houston and 1978's Think It Over", as well as her hit singles "Warning-Danger" and "Think It Over". Also featured are her cover versions which appeared on the two albums, such as "Make It Easy on Yourself", "Tomorrow", Elton John's "Your Song" and "He Ain't Heavy, He's My Brother".

== Track listing ==
No.	Title	Writer(s)	Length
1.	"Think It Over"	Alvin Fields; Cissy Houston; Michael Zager	5:59
2.	"Love Don't Hurt People"	Ron Netsky; Steve Netsky	3:01
3.	"Somebody Should Have Told Me"	Houston; Doug Frank; Doug James	4:26
4.	"After You"	Frank; James	4:41
5.	"Warning - Danger"	Fields; Houston; Frank	5:53
6.	"I Just Want To Be With You"	Fields; Zager	5:03
7.	"An Umbrella Song"	Fields; Zager	2:55
8.	"Sometimes"	Fields; Houston; Zager	3:30
9.	"I Won't Be The One"	Fields; Houston; Frank	2:59
10.	"Morning Much Better - 4:09"	Aram Schefrin; Zager	4:09
11.	"Love Is Holding On"	Barbara Morr; Betsy Durkin Matthes	3:30
12.	"It Never Really Ended"	Fields; Barbara Soehner	2:53
13.	"Love Is Something That Leads You"	Barbara Soehner; Zager	2:59
14.	"Tomorrow"	Charles Strouse; Martin Charnin	3:33
15.	"He Ain't Heavy, He's My Brother"	Bobby Russell; Bobby Scott	4:23
16.	"Make It Easy on Yourself"	Burt Bacharach; Hal David	5:17
17.	"Things to Do"	Harry Vanda; George Young	3:22
18.	"Your Song"	Elton John; Bernie Taupin	5:44

CD Album liner notes

== Credits ==
- Producer, Arranger & Conductor: Michael Zager
