= Step Aside for a Lady =

Studio album by Cissy Houston
- Released: 1980
- Recorded: Secret Sound; Mediasound, New York City; CBS, New York City
- Genre: Soul; Disco; R&B
- Label: Columbia Records
- Producer: Michael Zager

Cissy Houston chronology
Warning - Danger (1979)	Step Aside for a Lady (1980)	I'll Take Care of You (1992)

Singles from Step Aside for a Lady
- 1. "Break It to Me Gently" Released: 1980; 2. "You're the Fire" Released: 1980

Step Aside for a Lady is the fourth solo album by American soul singer Cissy Houston, released in 1980 on Columbia Records. It features the R&B hit songs, "Break It to Me Gently" and "You're the Fire".

The entire album features backing vocals by herself and her friends, Luther Vandross, Jocelyn Brown, and Eltesa Weathersby, and it was produced by Michael Zager with executive producer Jerry Love. "Break It to Me Gently" would be recorded a year later by jazz fusion singer Angela Bofill on her third album, Something About You.

== Track listing ==
Side One
No.	Title	Writer(s)	Length
1.	"Break It to Me Gently"	Douglas Frank; Doug James	3:52
2.	"You're the Fire"	Philip Vear; Victor Davis	5:55
3.	"It Doesn't Only Happen at Night"	Alvin Fields; Cissy Houston; Michael Zager	5:56
4.	"Just One Man"	Fields; Houston; Frank; Rhetta Hughes	4:13

Side Two
No.	Title	Writer(s)	Length
5.	"Step Aside for a Lady"	Fields; Houston; Zager	6:10
6.	"What I Miss"	Houston; Zager	6:12
7.	"Gonna Take the Easy Way Out"	Fields; Houston; Zager; Frank; Eltesa Weathersby	6:07

LP, Vinyl notes

== Personnel ==
- Arranged By [Vocals] – Cissy Houston
- Backing Vocals – Cissy Houston, Eltesa Weathersby, Jocelyn Brown, Luther Vandross
- Bass – Francisco Centeno (tracks: A1, A2, B1, B2), Will Lee (tracks: A3, A4, B4)
- Drums – Allan Schwartzberg
- Engineer – Craig Winterson, Darroll Gustamachio, Jason Corsaro, Lincoln Clapp, Lou Brosnan, Lou Schlossberg, Michael Barbiero, Rick Rowe, Tim Geelan
- Executive-Producer – Jerry Love
- Guitar – Jeff Mironov (tracks: A1, A2, B1, B2), Steve Love (tracks: A3, A4, B4)
- Keyboards – Rob Mounsey
- Management – Billy Fields
- Mastered By – Bob Carbone, Stuart Alan Love
- Mixed By – Michael Barbiero
- Percussion – Rubens Bassini
- Producer, Arranged By, Conductor – Michael Zager
- Reeds – Jerry Niewood
- Saxophone – Ronnie Cuber
- Strings – The Alfred V. Brown String Section
- Trombone – Gerald Chamberlain
- Trumpet – John Gatchell

== Credits ==
- Recorded at Secret Sound Studios, NY, Mediasound, NY, CBS Recording Studios, NY
- Mixed at Mediasound, NY
- Mastered at A&M Recording Studios
