= I'll Take Care of You (Chuck Jackson and Cissy Houston album) =

Studio album by Chuck Jackson and Cissy Houston
- Released: September, 1992 U.S.
- Recorded: Acme Studios, Mamaroneck, NY (June 25–27, July 6–8)
- Genre: Soul, R&B
- Length: 42:25
- Label: Shanachie Records
- Producer: Peter Denenberg, Joe Ferry

Chuck Jackson chronology
I Want to Give You Some Love (1980)	I'll Take Care of You (1992)	Encore/Mr. Everything (1994)

Cissy Houston albums chronology
Step Aside For A Lady (1980)	I'll Take Care of You (1992)	Face To Face (1996)

Professional ratings
Review scores
Source	Rating
AllMusic	3/5 stars
The Encyclopedia of Popular Music	2/5 stars

I'll Take Care of You is a duet album by American soul/gospel singers Cissy Houston and Chuck Jackson, released in 1992. It was issued by Shanachie Records, and contains their cover-versions of The Stylistics' "You Make Me Feel Brand New", Bob Marley's "Waiting in Vain", as well as Chuck Jackson's "I Don't Want to Cry".

== Critical reception ==
The Globe and Mail wrote that "the results aren't flashy – no two octave runs or glass-shattering falsetto sweeps here – but the warmth of the two voices together and Jackson's subtle and powerful solo work make young 'uns like Whitney and Bobby Brown sound like pale pretenders to the soul throne." The Boston Globe wrote that "Houston and Jackson alternate leads and join on thrilling duets in this live-sounding disc done with minimal overdubs." The Washington Post deemed the album "a series of alternately intimate and rousing duets."

== Track listing ==
No.	Title	Writer(s)	Length
1.	"Looking for a Love"	James Alexander; Zelda Samuels	3:53
2.	"Always on My Mind"	Johnny Christopher; Mark James; Wayne Carson	4:31
3.	"I Don't Want to Cry"	Chuck Jackson – Luther Dixon	4:26
4.	"Why Do You Turn Away (aka "Love Is Something That Leads You")"	Barbara Soehner - Michael Zager	3:51
5.	"Take Me Back, I'm Sorry"	Larry Weiss	3:23
6.	"Are You Lonely For Me, Baby?"	Bert Berns	4:14
7.	"I Wanna Be With You"	Charles Strouse – Lee Adams	4:04
8.	"Waiting in Vain"	Bob Marley	3:41
9.	"I'll Take Good Care Of You"	Jerry Ragovoy; Bert Berns	3:59
10.	"You Make Me Feel Brand New"	Thom Bell; Linda Creed	6:33

== Personnel ==
- Doug Munro – arrangements, mixing
- Stefan Grossman – art direction
- Chuck Jackson, Cissy Houston – lead vocals
- Amanda Homi, Chuck St. Troy, Diane Garisto, Lenora Zenzalai Helm, Nicki Richards, Vaneese Thomas – backing vocals
- Wilbur Bascomb – bass
- Tommy McDonnell – congas, backing vocals
- Joan Pelosi – design
- Bernard Purdie – drums
- Hiram Bullock – electric guitar
- Thom Leinbach – engineer
- Gil Parris – guitar
- Robert Vosgien – digital mastering
- Randall Grass – mixing
- Shari Weingarten – photography
- Richard Tee – piano, organ
- Peter Denenberg – producer, engineer, mixing
- Joe Ferry – producer, mixing, acoustic guitar, percussion
- Bruce Williamson – synthesizer, saxophone
- Barry Danielian – trumpet, flugelhorn

== Credits ==
- Producers: Joe Ferry and Peter Deneberg
