= Face to Face (Cissy Houston album) =

Face To Face

Studio album by Cissy Houston
- Released: March 26, 1996 (U.S.)
- Recorded: 1995, 1996 (Hit Factory, NY & BKB Studio, NJ)
- Genre: Gospel, R&B
- Length: 60:47
- Label: House of Blues Music/BMG Music
- Producer: Cissy Houston, Jimmy Vivino

Cissy Houston chronology
Midnight Train to Georgia (1995)	Face To Face (1996)	He Leadeth Me (1997)

Face To Face is the sixth studio album by American gospel/soul singer Cissy Houston, released in 1996 on the House of Blues Music distributed by BMG. The album features the spiritual anthems "Amazing Grace" and "Go Where I Send Thee", as well as gospel version of Holland-Dozier's "How Sweet It Is (To Be Loved by You)". Houston co-arranged and co-produced the album, as well as writing six of the album's tracks. Her son, singer Gary Houston, contributed backing vocals on the song "God Don't Ever Change".

The album received a Grammy Award in 1997 for Best Traditional Gospel Album of 1996.

== Track listing ==
No.	Title	Writer(s)	Length
1.	"God Don't Ever Change"	Willie Johnson; John Emery	3:18
2.	"The Lord Will Make a Way Somehow"	Thomas A. Dorsey	4:22
3.	"How Sweet It Is"	Holland-Dozier-Holland; Brian Holland; Lamont Dozier	6:39
4.	"I'm Somebody"	Cissy Houston	3:47
5.	"Amazing Grace"		4:42
6.	"Too Close to Heaven"	Alex E. Bradford, Jr	5:50
7.	"Without God"	Cissy Houston	5:11
8.	"Something's Bound to Happen"	Cissy Houston; Joseph L. Knight	6:18
9.	"Just Tell Him"	Cissy Houston	4:58
10.	"Face to Face"	Cissy Houston	6:19
11.	"Go Where I Send Thee"		3:51
12.	"He is the Music"	Cissy Houston; Joel Moss; Ouida Harding	5:11

== Personnel ==
- Arranged by – Jimmy Vivino (tracks: 1), Ouida W. Harding (tracks: 3, 12)
- Arranged By, Producer, Vocals – Cissy Houston
- Engineer, Mixed By, Producer – Joel Moss
- Vocals – Gary Houston (tracks: 1)
- Bass – Will Lee
- Choir – Angelisa Guilford, Anita Jackson, Emma Davis, Gary Houston, Ingrid Arthur, Irma Harding, Kim Smith, LaTasha Spencer, Pamela Zimmerman, Patricia Houston, Ray Gordon, Raymond Kevin Alford, Robert E. Alston, Rochelle Foster, Sharon Thomas, Shirley Ullah, Stewart Ross, Tawanna Choice, Teresa Gattison, Vera Hubbard
- Drums – Steve Jordan
- Edited By, Mastered by – Ric Wilson
- Engineer [Assistant] – Glen Marchese, Kevin Leonard, Kurt Lundvall, Rich Weingart, Tom Hardisty
- Guitar – Jimmy Vivino
- Organ – Leon Pendarvis, Rudy Copeland
- Percussion – Steve Forman
- Piano, Organ – Ouida W. Harding

== Credits ==
- Recorded at Hit Factory, NY & BKB Studio, NJ.

Mixed at Signet Sound, Hollywood CA.
Edited & mastered at DigiSonics, Tarzana, CA

House of Blues Music Co., BMG Distribution
