= Fairview Cemetery & Arboretum (Westfield, New Jersey) =

Cemetery in Westfield, New Jersey

Coordinates: 40.666252°N 74.330578°W

Fairview Cemetery & Arboretum is a cemetery and accredited arboretum in Westfield, New Jersey. It is a member of the American Public Gardens Association.

The cemetery was founded in 1868 and is 105 acres. It is a "non-sectarian, non-profit organization, owned and operated solely for the benefit of its Property Owners."

== Notable burials ==
- Charles E. Apgar (1865–1950), amateur radio operator
- Virginia Apgar (1909–1974), pioneer of neonatology and the Apgar score
- Bobbi Kristina Brown (1993–2015), singer and TV star
- Joe Collins (1922–1989), baseball player
- Charles N. Fowler (1922–1989), US Congressman
- Cissy Houston (1933–2024), singer
- Whitney Houston (1963–2012), singer and actress
- Claydes Charles Smith (1948–2006), co-founder of Kool & the Gang
- William Miller Sperry (1858–1927), namesake of the William Miller Sperry Observatory and brother of Thomas Sperry.
