= Midnight Train to Georgia =

Single by Gladys Knight & the Pips

from the album Imagination
- B-side: "Midnight Train to Georgia" (instrumental); "Window Raisin' Granny" (optional)
- Released: August 1973
- Recorded: 1973
- Studio: Venture Sound, Somerville, New Jersey
- Genre: Soul; country soul; R&B; soft rock
- Length: 4:38 (album version); 3:55 (single version)
- Label: Buddah
- Songwriter: Jim Weatherly
- Producers: Tony Camillo & Gladys Knight & the Pips

Gladys Knight & the Pips singles chronology
"All I Need Is Time" (1973)	"Midnight Train to Georgia" (1973)	"I've Got to Use My Imagination" (1973)

Audio
- "Midnight Train to Georgia" on YouTube

"Midnight Train to Georgia" is a song most famously performed by Gladys Knight & the Pips, their second release after departing Motown Records for Buddah Records. Written by Jim Weatherly and included on the Pips' 1973 LP Imagination, "Midnight Train to Georgia" became the group's first single to top the Billboard Hot 100. It also won the 1974 Grammy Award for Best R&B Vocal Performance by a Duo, Group or Chorus and has become Knight's signature song. In 2026, the song was selected by the Library of Congress for preservation in the National Recording Registry for its "cultural, historical or aesthetic importance in the nation's recorded sound heritage."

The song is sung from the perspective of someone whose lover, having failed to become a Hollywood star, is leaving Los Angeles to move back to Georgia, taking the titular "midnight train". The singer expresses her commitment to accompanying him to Georgia: "And I'll be with him (I know you will) / On that midnight train to Georgia".

== Background ==
The song was originally written and performed by Jim Weatherly under the title "Midnight Plane to Houston", which he recorded on Jimmy Bowen's Amos Records. "It was based on a conversation I had with somebody... about taking a midnight plane to Houston," Weatherly recalls. "I wrote it as a kind of a country song. Then we sent the song to a guy named Sonny Limbo in Atlanta and he wanted to cut it with Cissy Houston... he asked if I minded if he changed the title to 'Midnight Train to Georgia'. And I said, 'I don't mind. Just don't change the rest of the song.'"

Weatherly, in a later interview with Gary James, stated that the phone conversation in question had been with Farrah Fawcett, and he used Fawcett and her friend Lee Majors, whom she had just started dating, "as kind of like characters." Weatherly, at a program in Nashville, said he had been the quarterback at the University of Mississippi, and the NFL didn't work out for him, so he was in Los Angeles trying to write songs. He was in a rec football league with Lee Majors and called Majors one night. Farrah Fawcett answered the phone and he asked what she was doing. She said she was "taking the midnight plane to Houston" to visit her family. He thought that was a catchy phrase for a song, and in writing the song, wondered why someone would leave L.A. on the midnight plane – which brought the idea of a "superstar, but he didn't get far".

Gospel/soul singer Cissy Houston recorded the song as "Midnite Train to Georgia" (spelled "Midnight ..." on the UK single) released in 1973. Her version can also be found on her albums Midnight Train to Georgia: The Janus Years (1995), and the reissue of her 1970 debut album, Presenting Cissy Houston originally released on Janus Records.

Knight had changed record companies from Motown to Buddah Records, a company with a broader appeal. Weatherly's publisher forwarded the Houston version to Gladys Knight and the Pips, who followed Houston's lead and kept the title "Midnight Train to Georgia" but changed the character of the song. Tony Camillo and Ed Stasium recorded and produced the Al Green-inspired instrumental backing track using a basic band set-up. The vocal recording introduced Knight to ad-libbing towards the end, assisted by her brother. The Pips featured prominently in the call-and-response aspect of the song.

The single debuted on the Hot 100 at number 71 and became the group's first number-one hit eight weeks later when it jumped from number 5 to number 1 on October 27, 1973, replacing "Angie" by the Rolling Stones. It remained in the top position for two weeks. It was replaced by "Keep On Truckin' (Part 1)" by Eddie Kendricks. It also reached number one on the soul singles chart, their fifth on that chart. The record was awarded an RIAA Gold single (for selling one million copies) on October 18, 1973. On the UK Singles Chart, it peaked at number ten on June 5, 1976.

Eddie Middleton had a degree of success with the song. His version made it into the Cash Box Top 100 Country chart and on the fourth week on July 2, 1977, it peaked at no. 84.

In her autobiography, Between Each Line of Pain and Glory, Gladys Knight wrote that she hoped the song was a comfort to the many thousands who come each year from elsewhere to Los Angeles to realize the dream of being in motion pictures, television or music, but then fail to realize that dream and plunge into despair.

In 1999, "Midnight Train to Georgia" was inducted into the Grammy Hall of Fame. It currently ranks #470 on Rolling Stone's updated list of their 500 Greatest Songs of All Time.

== Charts ==
=== Weekly charts ===
Chart (1973–1974)	Peak position
Australia KMR	52
Canada RPM Top Singles	5
Canada RPM Adult Contemporary	13
UK (OCC)	10
US Billboard Hot 100	1
US Billboard Adult Contemporary	19
US Billboard R&B	1
US Cash Box Top 100	1

=== Year-end charts ===
Chart (1973)	Rank
Canada RPM Top Singles	120
US Billboard Hot 100	49
US Cash Box Top 100	15

Chart (1974)	Rank
Canada RPM Top Singles	80

== Certifications ==
Region	Certification	Certified units/sales
New Zealand (RMNZ)	3× Platinum	90,000^{‡}
United Kingdom (BPI)	Platinum	600,000^{‡}
United States (RIAA)	Gold	1,000,000^{^}
^{^} Shipments figures based on certification alone.^{‡} Sales+streaming figures based on certification alone.

== Appearance in other media ==
The song appears in the Vietnam War film The Deer Hunter, playing in a strip club in Saigon visited by Nick (Christopher Walken) in one scene.

The song plays a notable role in the 1987 film Broadcast News. The character Aaron Altman listens to the song while at home, upset at not being chosen to work on a special breaking news report. While reading a book and simultaneously juggling remotes for his stereo and his television to mute one or the other, he sings: "I can sing / while I read / I am singing / and reading both!"

Episode 20 ("The Choice") of season 6 of the American medical drama House features a scene where the characters Gregory House, Robert Chase and Eric Foreman perform a karaoke rendition of the song.

Episode 210 of the TV series 30 Rock ends with Kenneth Parcell attempting to take the midnight train to Georgia after getting addicted to caffeine, only to return quickly noting that the train actually leaves at 23:45. The episode ends with a rendition of the song by most of the cast (and a speaking-only cameo by Knight herself).

Ben Stiller, Jack Black and Robert Downey Jr. re-enacted the Pips' dance moves from a live performance of the song for the season seven finale of American Idol.

Garry Trudeau did a Sunday color Doonesbury comic strip featuring this song, though Georgia was changed to the ignominious "Cranston" in Rhode Island, and an unnamed song/dance group; it was published on July 28, 1974. It has been informally referred to as the "Beats Working" strip.

Episode 56 of Will and Grace featured the title characters posing as millionaires interested in purchasing Sandra Bernhard's co-op, with the latter inviting them to sing along during a rehearsal in which she was rehearsing this song. Bernhard also performed the song during her 1998 one-woman show I'm Still Here... Damn It!

The song was mentioned in "The Ice of Boston", a song on The Dismemberment Plan's 1997 album The Dismemberment Plan Is Terrified.

The cast of Modern Family sing the chorus of the song in the season 5 episode "The Late Show".

Sports channel FS1 used the song in their closing montage for the 2021 World Series, as the Atlanta Braves won the World Series that year.

The BBC series Rock n Roll Years used the song in their 1976 episode with footage of the resignation of UK Prime Minister Harold Wilson.

The song is covered in one of the final scenes of the HBO limited series adaptation of Station Eleven.

== Personnel ==
Production and vocals

- Lead vocals by Gladys Knight
- Background vocals by Merald "Bubba" Knight, Eddie Patten, and William Guest
- Written by Jim Weatherly
- Produced and arranged by Tony Camillo
- Co-produced by Gladys Knight, Merald "Bubba" Knight, Eddie Patten, and William Guest

Track details

Initial track recorded at Venture Sound Studios, Hillsborough, New Jersey, 1973:

- Drums: Andrew Smith
- Bass: Bob Babbitt
- Guitar: Jeff Mironov (playing a 1955 Fender Stratocaster)
- Electric piano: Tony Camillo

Overdubs recorded at Venture Sound Studios:

- Acoustic piano: Barry Miles
- Hammond organ: Tony Camillo
- Percussion: Tony Camillo
- Violin: Norman Carr
- Cello: Jesse Levy
- Trumpet: Randy Brecker
- Saxophone: Michael Brecker
- Trombone: Meco Monardo
- Vocals were recorded at Artie Fields Studio in Detroit. Gladys Knight recorded her lead vocals in a single take. She later recorded a punch-in of a single line in New York City.
- Recorded and mixed by Ed Stasium

== See also ==
- List of train songs
