= Bobbi Kristina Brown =

American television personality and singer (1993–2015)

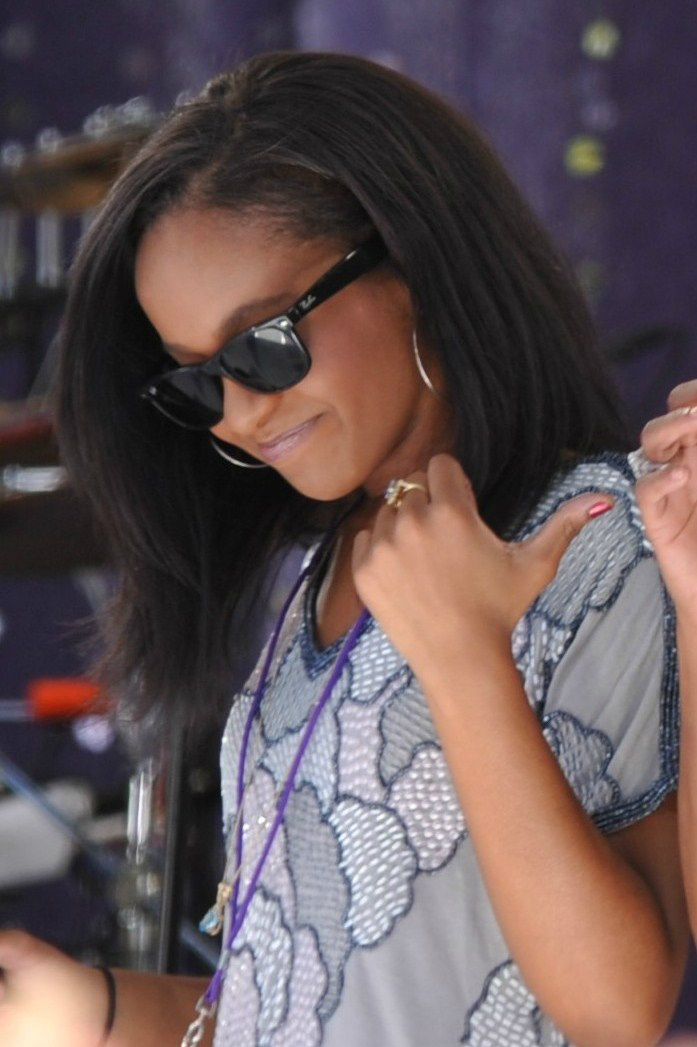
- Brown in 2009
- Born: March 4, 1993; Livingston, New Jersey, U.S.
- Died: July 26, 2015 (aged 22); Duluth, Georgia, U.S.
- Cause of death: Lobar pneumonia
- Burial place: Fairview Cemetery, Westfield, New Jersey, U.S.
- Other name: Krissy
- Occupations: Reality television personality; singer
- Years active: 1998–2015
- Partner: Nick Gordon (2012–2015) (Note: Until Brown's death)
- Parents: Whitney Houston; Bobby Brown
- Relatives: Cissy Houston (grandmother); John Houston (grandfather); Gary Garland (half-uncle); Leontyne Price (cousin twice removed); Dee Dee Warwick (cousin once removed); Dionne Warwick (cousin once removed); Damon Elliott (second cousin); Jeremiah Burke Sanderson (great-great-great-grandfather)

Bobbi Kristina Brown (March 4, 1993 – July 26, 2015) was an American reality television personality and singer. She was the only child of singers Whitney Houston and Bobby Brown. Her parents' fame kept Brown in the public eye, as did her appearances on the reality show Being Bobby Brown.

Brown intended to become a singer, actress, and dancer like her parents. She performed with her mother at concerts a number of times, as well as singing a cover of her mother's song "I'm Your Baby Tonight" on The Houstons: On Our Own. She appeared as herself on a number of television shows and specials, and played a role on Tyler Perry's television series For Better or Worse in 2012.

On January 31, 2015, Brown was found unconscious in a bathtub in her home after ingesting numerous drugs and alcohol, a fate similar to that of her mother. After being in a coma for nearly six months, Brown died from lobar pneumonia on July 26, at the age of 22. After her death, her life was the subject of a television movie in 2017 and a documentary in 2021.

== Early life ==
Brown was born on March 4, 1993, at Saint Barnabas Medical Center in Livingston, New Jersey, to singers Whitney Houston and Bobby Brown. Through her mother, Brown was related to many singers and entertainers: her maternal grandmother was singer Cissy Houston of The Drinkard Singers; her mother's cousins were singers Dee Dee Warwick, Dionne Warwick, and Leontyne Price. Brown's uncle was former professional basketball player Gary Garland, her mother's half-brother. Through her father, Brown had six half-siblings: Landon, La'Princia, Robert "Bobby" Jr., Cassius, Bodhi, and Hendrix. Her godmother was gospel singer CeCe Winans and her godfather was music executive Clive Davis.

Brown grew up in front of cameras, appearing beside Houston during an interview with Barbara Walters at eight months old, and appearing aged one on stage at the 1994 American Music Awards, when her mother accepted an award. Her vocals were featured on her mother's 1998 song "My Love Is Your Love" for the album of the same title. When her mother brought her to the recording studio and held her up to the microphone, she said "Sing, mommy," which can be heard during the first verse of the song; she says, "Clap your hands!" at the end of the track. Brown was featured on her mother's 2003 Christmas album, titled One Wish: The Holiday Album, on "The Little Drummer Boy". When Brown's parents divorced in 2007, her mother was awarded custody.

The Guardian writer Caroline Sullivan characterized Brown's childhood as difficult because of her parents' drug problems. TheWrap stated, "Brown grew up under the media glare, with her family issues playing out in a very public way." The media also scrutinized Brown's weight; BET, Essence, and the Daily Beast all wrote articles commenting and speculating on Brown's fluctuating weight. Author Mark Bego characterized Brown's teenage years as "no picnic", because of the media focus on her and her "extreme growing pains" because of that.

== Adult life ==
Brown's mother died at age 48 in a hotel bathtub in February 2012 from what was later ruled an accidental drowning with heart disease and cocaine use listed as contributing factors. Brown was described as "inconsolable" and a few days later was admitted to Cedars-Sinai Medical Center in Los Angeles: according to a family friend, Brown was "overwhelmed". In accordance with her mother's will, Brown was the beneficiary of Houston's entire estate including her clothing, jewelry, cars, personal effects, and furniture. The will provided for Brown to receive trust fund payments in installments until she reached age 30, after which she was to receive the remainder of Houston's $115 million estate.

In March 2012, Brown said she felt her mother's spirit and expressed her intention to carry on her mother's legacy by doing the "singing thing," along with starting a career as an actor and dancer. She was subsequently cast in her acting debut for a recurring role as Tina the receptionist in Tyler Perry's For Better or Worse television series. Perry stated "She did a fantastic job. And that kid has such a future. She's such an actor. I'm so proud of her. I'm telling you, as far as she wants to go in the business, she can." After rumors began Brown had "tearfully exited the set" of the show, Perry came to her defense stating that had never happened. Brown hoped to be cast in Angela Bassett's biographical film Whitney based on her mother. When Bassett did not cast her, Brown called her a "bitch". Bassett said that she did not cast Brown "for a number of reasons... she's not an actress, and acting is a craft". Brown later apologized to Bassett on Twitter after generating controversy among fans.

In July 2013, Brown announced her engagement to a close family friend, Nick Gordon, who had come to live in the Houston household when he was 12 years old but was never formally adopted. The announcement caused controversy within the family; before making their romantic involvement known, Brown had referred to him as her "big bruh" in online posts. Brown said the couple received her grandmother Cissy's blessing prior to their engagement. Though the two never legally married, Brown and Gordon announced they had married on January 9, 2014.

== Coma and death ==
On January 31, 2015, Gordon (her husband) and a friend found Brown face down in a bathtub in her home in Alpharetta, Georgia. They began CPR until emergency medical services personnel arrived. According to the police spokesperson, Brown was alive and breathing after being transported to North Fulton Hospital in Roswell, Georgia. The spokesperson also said that investigators found no evidence to indicate that drugs or alcohol caused the incident, but this was later disputed. Doctors placed Brown in an induced coma after determining her brain function was "significantly diminished", and her family was told a meaningful recovery would be "a miracle".

Brown died in hospice care on July 26, 2015, at age 22. Her death was considered similar to her mother's death, as both had died from effects of being submerged in a bathtub. The initial autopsy found no "obvious underlying cause of death and no significant injuries", and the Fulton County Medical Examiner's office said more tests were forthcoming. A statement released by the family thanked "everyone for their tremendous amount of love and support during these last few months". Several prominent celebrities offered their condolences, including Chris Brown, Oprah Winfrey, and Whitney Houston protégées Brandy and Monica. Funeral services were held August 1, 2015, at St. James United Methodist Church in Alpharetta, Georgia. Brown was buried two days later, between her mother and maternal grandfather, at Fairview Cemetery in Westfield, New Jersey.

=== Autopsy report ===
The Fulton County Medical Examiner's office said it used both medical records and police investigative files to arrive at a determination for Brown's cause of death. According to the statement, her body tested positive for marijuana, alcohol, the cocaine metabolite benzoylecgonine, benzodiazepines (typically used to treat anxiety) and morphine.

As to the cause of death, it found the "underlying cause" of death as "immersion associated with drug intoxication". However, the manner of death could not be confirmed. The summary statement read, "Death was clearly not due to natural causes, but the medical examiner was not able to determine whether death was due to intentional or accidental causes, and therefore classified the manner of death as undetermined."

A finalized autopsy report determined Brown died of lobar pneumonia.

== Posthumous films ==
After Brown's death, a television movie about her life was released, followed by a documentary on her and her mother. TV One released Bobbi Kristina in 2017. The Atlanta Journal-Constitution wrote, "The story is ripe with melodrama as newcomer actress Joy Rovaris channels Bobbi Kristina's relationship with her mom, her love affair with Nick Gordon and the aftermath of her mother's death." Lifetime released the documentary Whitney Houston & Bobbi Kristina: Didn't We Almost Have It All in 2021, which The Atlanta Journal-Constitution called "...less an exposé and more a loving tribute to these two women".

== Discography ==
Brown spoke and sang in some of her mother's recordings and televised performances, as well as on a television show after her mother's death.

Performances and releases
Year	Song	Album	Notes
1998	"My Love Is Your Love"	My Love Is Your Love	Uncredited spoken comments during the first verse and closing of the song
1998	"My Love Is Your Love"	—N/a	Live duet with Whitney Houston on concert stage in Poland
1999	"My Love Is Your Love"	VH1 Divas Live 1999: Whitney Houston (Live) – Single	Live duet with Whitney Houston featuring Treach at the Divas Live '99 concert
2003	"Little Drummer Boy"	One Wish: The Holiday Album	Featured singer with Whitney Houston
2007	"Family First"	Tyler Perry's "Daddy's Little Girls" – Music Inspired by the Film	Studio recording with Whitney Houston, Cissy Houston, and Dionne Warwick
2009	"My Love Is Your Love"	—N/a	Live duet with Whitney Houston at the Good Morning America Concert in Central Park on September 1, 2009
2012	"I'm Your Baby Tonight"	—N/a	Performed on The Houstons: On Our Own

== Filmography ==
Year	Title	Role	Notes
2005	Being Bobby Brown	Herself	
2009	The Oprah Winfrey Show	Herself	Episode: "Whitney Houston"
2012	Oprah's Next Chapter	Herself	
2012	The 2012 Billboard Music Awards	Herself	
2012–2013	The Houstons: On Our Own	Herself	
2012	For Better or Worse	Tina the receptionist	
2021	Whitney Houston & Bobbi Kristina: Didn't We Almost Have It All	Herself	Posthumous Lifetime television documentary
