= Presenting Cissy Houston =

Studio album by Cissy Houston
- Released: September 1970
- Recorded: 1969
- Genre: Soul; gospel; R&B
- Length: 1:09:03
- Label: Major Minor (UK); Janus (US)
- Producer: Bob Finiz; Donald Rubin; Charles Koppelman

Cissy Houston chronology
Presenting Cissy Houston (1970)	Cissy Houston (1977)

United States release

Singles from Presenting Cissy Houston
- 1. "He–I Believe"/"I'll Be There" Released: 1970; 2. "The Long and Winding Road"/"Be My Baby" Released: 1970; 3. "I Just Don't Know What to Do with Myself"/"This Empty Place" Released: 1970; 4. "Be My Baby"/"I'll Be There" Released: 1971

Presenting Cissy Houston is the debut album by American soul singer/backing vocalist and former Sweet Inspirations lead singer Cissy Houston, originally released on Major Minor Records in 1970 in the United Kingdom. Her contract was sold to Janus Records the same year. They released the album in the United States as Cissy Houston in 1970. The 2012 CD re-release on Cherry Red Records incorporates bonus tracks from later recordings.

== Background ==
The album features a pop/soul cover version of "I Just Don't Know What to Do with Myself", written by Burt Bacharach and Hal David, as well as covers of Bobby Darin's "I'll Be There" (which became a top 20 R&B hit for her), Melanie's "Any Guy", Sam & Dave's "When Something Is Wrong with My Baby", the Ronettes' "Be My Baby" (at No. 31 on the R&B chart), and the Beatles' "The Long and Winding Road". The CD bonus tracks include her 1972 version of "Midnight Train to Georgia", which was later covered with huge success by Gladys Knight & the Pips.

== Reception ==
Professional ratings
Review scores
Source	Rating
Christgau's Record Guide	C

In the All Music Guide to Soul book, critic Richie Unterberger opines that "although the material consisted of fairly well-worn soul, rock, and pop tunes, the state-of-the-art arrangements and gospel-ish vocals made them sound fresh."

== Track listing ==
Side one

1. "I Just Don't Know What to Do with Myself" (Burt Bacharach, Hal David) – 2:15
2. "Didn't We" (Jimmy Webb) – 3:31
3. "I'll Be There" (Bobby Darin) – 2:58
4. "Any Guy" (Melanie Safka) – 3:14
5. "When Something Is Wrong with My Baby" (Isaac Hayes, David Porter) – 3:14

Side two

1. "Be My Baby" (Jeff Barry, Ellie Greenwich, Phil Spector) – 3:25
2. "This Empty Place" (Burt Bacharach, Hal David) – 2:31
3. "The Long and Winding Road" (John Lennon, Paul McCartney) – 3:49
4. "He/I Believe" (Al Stillman, Ervin Drake, Irvin Graham, Jack Richards, Jimmy Shirl, Richard Mullan) – 3:18

CD reissue bonus tracks

1. "Darling, Take Me Back" (Larry Weiss) – 2:52
2. "Hang On to a Dream" (Tim Hardin) – 4:07
3. "Love You" (Ed Townsend) – 3:15
4. "Making Love" (Bert Keyes, Myrna March) – 2:58
5. "It's Not Easy" (Barry Mann, Cynthia Weil) – 2:44
6. "Midnight Train To Georgia" (Jim Weatherly) – 3:56
7. "Will You Still Love Me Tomorrow" (Gerry Goffin, Carole King) – 3:29
8. "Only Time You Say You Love Me" (Phillip Mitchell) – 3:33
9. "I'm So Glad I Can Love Again" (Norma Toney) – 3:38
10. "Nothing Can Stop Me" (Tony Hester) – 4:49
11. "Don't Wonder Why" (Leonard Caston) – 3:16
12. "Down in the Boondocks" (Joe South) – 2:11

== Personnel ==
- Arranged By – Bert DeCoteaux (tracks: 1–11), Steve H. Dorff (tracks: 15, 16)
- Mastered By – Alan Wilson
- Producer – Bob Finiz (tracks: 1–11), Charles Koppelman (tracks: 1–11), Donald Rubin (tracks: 1–11), Bert DeCoteaux (tracks: 12–14)
  Cissy Houston (tracks: 12–14), Sonny Limbo (tracks: 15, 16), Don Davis (tracks: 17–19),
- Reissue Producer – David Nathan
- Distributed By – Cherry Red Records
- Marketed By – Cherry Red Records
- According to the liner notes, the producer of tracks 20–21 is unknown, and since no tape sources for these tracks could be located, they were transferred from vinyl. The producer was Stephan Galfas.

== Charts ==
Singles

Year	Title	US Pop	US R&B
1970	"I'll Be There"	54	20
1971	"Be My Baby"	92	31
