= Joel Moss =

American record producer (1946–2025)

- Born: May 11, 1946; Detroit, Michigan, U.S.
- Died: September 15, 2025 (aged 79); Saratoga Springs, New York, U.S.
- Occupation: Record producer; sound mixer; sound engineer
- Years active: 1969–2025

Joel Moss (May 11, 1946 – September 15, 2025) was an American record producer, sound engineer, and mixer.

== Life and career ==
Moss was born in Detroit, Michigan, on May 11, 1946, to Jay Harmon and Dorothy Moss. At the age of twelve, he was performing with American and Canadian folk groups. He majored in architecture at the University of Minnesota. As a student he was able to work with the Minnesota Orchestra and recorded musicians such as Al Jarreau, Bobby Lyle and Willy Weeks. When folk music's popularity waned, Moss became a sound engineer and producer for rock and roll bands in Detroit.

He moved to Los Angeles in 1969 and found work producing and engineering projects for recording artists such as Little Richard, Joe Cocker and Johnny Cash. He became the executive director and chief engineer of The Record Plant Recording Studios in 1986. This recording company operated Paramount Pictures scoring stage, which enabled Moss to expand his musical endeavors with film music. He was able to develop new technology and production techniques. He became a member of the advisory board developing digital formats for film sound.

In 1990, he worked and became associated with the Hollywood Bowl Orchestra. Some of his associates were the maestro John Mauceri, Anne Parsons and the composer Michael Gore.

He founded his own Managra Music company in 1997, specializing in jazz and theatre.

In 2000, Moss was hired as a sound engineer and mixer by Kurt Deutsch and Sherie Rene Scott, the founders of Sh-K-Boom Records, a recording label that specializes in recording Broadway cast albums. Although most of the recording is done in New York City, he said he did production work at home.

One of Moss's Grammy Awards was won for Best Musical Show Album for producing the cast recording of In the Heights, a musical that opened on Broadway in 2008 about life in the street of Manhattan’s Washington Heights neighborhood. The show has different types of Latin music, including rap, salsa and meringue.

Moss was once quoted as saying, "I’m a bit cynical about awards in general, especially in today’s world; working is a lot more exciting than a reward. Also, to receive an award in a Broadway category when Broadway, like many things, is in dire straits is kind of daunting."

Of Moss’s seven Grammy awards, he said the most meaningful was recording Ray Charles for his album You Don't Know Me, recorded in 2004 and released in 2005. "The Grammy I won, for Ray Charles, was very special, because I was the last person who recorded him. He died a few days later. I was happy to be a part of it," Moss said.

Following a world premiere at the Colonial Theatre in Boston, High Fidelity, began previews on Broadway on November 20, 2006, opening on December 7. The musical closed at the Imperial Theatre on December 17. The single CD was produced by Moss and the Sh-K-Boom/Ghostlight President Kurt Deutsch. The recording has the original Broadway company, including Will Chase and Jenn Colella.

Moss was one of the engineers and sound mixers for Tony Bennett's Playin' with My Friends: Bennett Sings the Blues, winner of a 2002 Grammy Award.

After the opening of Aida starring Adam Pascal, Moss produced Pascal's first solo CD, Model Prisoner, heralded by critics as "a modern rock masterpiece". On Sh-K-Boom Records, Moss was dedicated to bridging the gap between pop music and theater. His credits include The Eagles, Joe Cocker, Talking Heads and Red Hot Chili Peppers. In 2005 they were invited to participate in a collaborative effort of original compositions involving 13 other outstanding artists of the Capital District of New York which resulted in Saratoga Pie, a CD produced by Moss.

Moss died in Saratoga Springs on September 15, 2025, at the age of 79.

== Discography ==
- The Film Music of Alex North as sound editor. Nonesuch label 1986
- The Mosquito Coast (original soundtrack recording) as sound engineer. Fantasy label 1987
- Fatal Attraction (original motion picture) as sound recorder and mixer. GNP/Crescendo label 1987
- Omen IV: The Awakening (original motion picture soundtrack) as sound mixer and engineer. Varese Sarabande label 1991
- South Pacific (music from the ABC Premiere Event) as engineer, sound mixer and producer. Sony Music label 2001
- Hollywood Bowl Orchestra on Broadway as sound mixer and engineer. Philips label 1996
- Disney's Silly Classical Songs as sound mixer and engineer. Disney label 2001
- Chicago (The Miramax motion picture) as engineer. Sony Music label 2002
- Little Women (original Broadway cast recording) as producer, audio producer, sound mixer. Ghostlight label 2005
- The 25th Annual Putnam County Spelling Bee (original Broadway cast recording) as producer, sound mixer, recorder. Ghostlight label 2005
- Columbus Jazz Orchestra, The Colors of Jazz as producer, sound mixer, recorder. 2006
- Columbus Jazz Orchestra, Come Together as producer, sound mixer, recorder. 2012
