= He Leadeth Me (album) =

Studio album by Cissy Houston
- Released: September 23, 1997 (U.S.)
- Recorded: 1996
- Genre: Gospel, R&B
- Length: 49:54
- Label: A & M Records
- Producer: Joel Moss, Cissy Houston

Cissy Houston chronology
| Face To Face (1996) | He Leadeth Me (1997) | Love Is Holding You' (2001) |

He Leadeth Me is a gospel album by American gospel/soul singer Cissy Houston, released in 1997 on A & M Records. All the tracks were written and arranged by Houston. The album was produced, mastered and mixed by Joel Moss.

The album earned Houston a Grammy Award in 1999 for Best Traditional Gospel Album for a second time following her previous win for the same category in 1997.

== Track listing ==
| No. | Title | Writer(s) | Length |
|---|---|---|---|
| 1. | "Deep River/Campbell" | Cissy Houston | 5:06 |
| 2. | "Prayer Will Change It" | Cissy Houston | 3:34 |
| 3. | "He Leadeth Me" | Cissy Houston | 4:13 |
| 4. | "Shelter in the Time of Storm" | Cissy Houston | 4:53 |
| 5. | "Count Your Blessings" | Cissy Houston | 4:45 |
| 6. | "Glory Train" | Cissy Houston | 4:58 |
| 7. | "In His Arms" | Cissy Houston | 5:31 |
| 8. | "Stop, Look and Listen" | Cissy Houston | 5:55 |
| 9. | "Every Day Every Hour" | Cissy Houston | 5:25 |
| 10. | "Father, Son, Holy Ghost Is Me" | Cissy Houston | 5:36 |
| 11. | "He Changed My Life" | Cissy Houston | 5:05 |

== Personnel ==
- Arranged By – Jimmy Vivino, Ouida Harding
- Arranged By, Producer, Vocals – Cissy Houston
- Engineer, Mixed, Mastered, Producer – Joel Moss
- Choir – Kevin Alford, Ingrid Arthur, Anita Jackson
- Trombone – Richie Rosenberg
- Jerry Vivino – Saxophone [Alto]
- Strings – Julien Barber, Elena Barere, Lamar Alsop, David Heiss, Jean Ingraham, Paul Peabody, Dan Mullen, Laura Seaton, Sue Pray, Pam Zimmerman, Marty Sweet, Lisa Steinberg
- Synthesizer – Bette Sussman
- Drums – Steve Jordan
- Jimmy Vivino – Guitar [Electric]
- Bass – T. M. Stevens
- Trumpet, Horn – Earl Gardner
- Patience Higgins – Saxophone [Baritone]
- Darmon Meader – Saxophone [Tenor]
- Edited By, Mastered By – Bernie Grundman
- Engineer – Paul J. Falcone, Mark Johnson
- Engineer [Assistant] – Ted Wolhsen
- Organ – Rudy Copeland
- Organ [Hammond] – Leon Pendarvis
- Percussion – Steve Forman
- Piano, Organ – Ouida Harding
