= Cissy Houston =

American singer and mother of Whitney Houston (1933–2024)

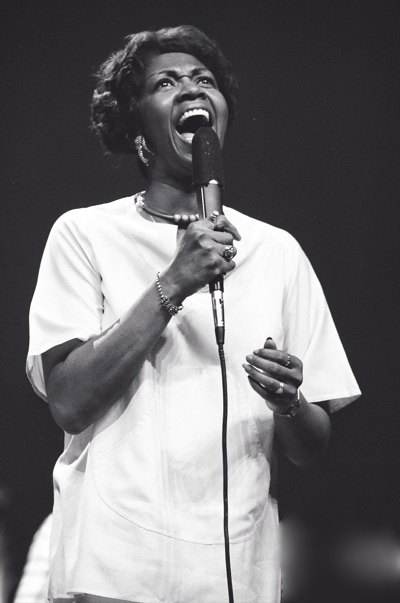
- Houston in 1975
- Born: Emily Lee Drinkard; September 30, 1933; Newark, New Jersey, U.S.
- Died: October 7, 2024 (aged 91); Newark, New Jersey, U.S.
- Burial place: Fairview Cemetery & Arboretum (Westfield, New Jersey)
- Occupation: Singer
- Years active: 1951–2018
- Spouses: Freddie Garland (m. 1955; div. 1959) John Houston Jr. (m. 1964; div. 1991)
- Children: 3, including Gary and Whitney
- Relatives: Bobbi Kristina Brown (granddaughter); Dionne Warwick (niece); Dee Dee Warwick (niece); Leontyne Price (cousin); Damon Elliott (grandnephew)
- Musical career
- Genres: Soul; R&B; gospel; pop; disco
- Instrument: Vocals
- Labels: RCA; Commonwealth United; Private Stock; Motown; Janus; Major Minor; Columbia; A&M; Delta Music; Harlem

Emily Lee "Cissy" Houston (née Drinkard; September 30, 1933 – October 7, 2024) was an American soul and gospel singer and choir director. Nicknamed The Duchess of Gospel, she is best known as the mother of American singer and actress Whitney Houston and the aunt of American singers Dionne Warwick and Dee Dee Warwick.

Born and raised in Newark, New Jersey, Houston began her singing career as the founding member of the family gospel group the Drinkard Singers, starting at the age of five. The group turned professional in 1951 and would continue performing until the early 1960s as Houston began a career as a session vocalist for several artists. In 1967, she formed the Sweet Inspirations, a Grammy-nominated girl group that backed Aretha Franklin and Elvis Presley before starting a full fledged solo career in 1970.

Her best-known solo singles include the top 20 R&B chart single, "I'll Be There", the original rendition of "Midnight Train to Georgia" and the top 5 dance single, "Think It Over". Her solo career culminated with two Grammy Award wins, both in the Traditional Gospel Album category.

Houston was honored by several institutions over her career. In 1990, she received the Stellar Award of Excellence for her contributions to gospel music. Five years later, in 1995, Houston earned the Rhythm and Blues Foundation Pioneer Award for her contributions to rhythm and blues and soul music. With the Sweet Inspirations, Houston was inducted into the National Rhythm and Blues Hall of Fame in 2014. In 2020, she was inducted into the New Jersey Hall of Fame. In 2025, Houston was inducted into the Gospel Music Hall of Fame Missouri in St. Louis, Missouri.

== Early life and family ==
Emily Lee Drinkard was born on September 30, 1933 at City Hospital in Newark, New Jersey to Delia Mae "Dee Dee" (née McCaskill) and Nicholas “Nitch” Drinkard, the youngest of eight children.

Houston was the granddaughter of a black landowner in Blakely, Georgia, who later shared the land he owned with Houston's father Nitch during a time when it was unusual for black people to have large landholdings. The asset was gradually depleted as they sold small portions of land over time to resolve the continued legal troubles of a close relative, which later led to the entire family relocating to Newark during the Great Migration a decade before Houston's birth.

Houston stated that she possessed some Dutch and Native American ancestry due to her grandparents Susan Bell (née Fuller) and John Drinkard Jr., respectively.

The Drinkards first settled at an apartment in a three-story tenement at Newark's 199 Court Street, located at the city's Third Ward projects. After a flash fire destroyed the building, they relocated to 38 Hillside Place. Houston's parents placed a high priority upon their children's education and church involvement.

Around the time of Houston's fifth birthday in September 1938, her mother Delia suffered a stroke. To help her recovery, and to lift the family's spirits, Houston's father encouraged her and her elder siblings Anne, Nicholas Jr. ("Nicky") and Larry to sing sacred hymns.

Later, the siblings formed the Drinkard Four (Note: In Houston's first book, How Sweet the Sound: My Life with God and Gospel, she recalled the group being called the Drinkard Quartet.) and sang jubilees in various churches, including their own St. Luke's A.M.E. Church. The experience, Houston said, ended her "carefree childhood".

Houston later told Rolling Stone in 1978: "I used to get so mad. We'd be out playing in the sun with the other kids and my older sister, Marie, would make us come in for rehearsal."

Three years later, in May 1941, Delia Drinkard died of a cerebral hemorrhage after suffering a fatal seizure in her bed. It was later discovered that Drinkard died shortly after giving birth to a set of twins, who died at stillbirth. Houston was just seven at the time of her mother's death.

Houston stated that she "found Christ" after listening to a sermon at the age of fourteen. Nitch Drinkard died of stomach cancer four years later in March 1952 when Houston was 18.

For a time, Houston went to live with her older sister Lee and her husband Mancel Warrick and helped to raise her two nieces, Dionne and Dee Dee, and her nephew Mancel Jr. before moving to an apartment on Newark's Eighth Street. Soprano Leontyne Price is a Drinkard cousin.

Houston attended South Side High School in Newark, graduating there in 1952. Following her father's death, Houston worked at RCA Electronics until 1961. Raised Methodist Episcopal, Houston shifted to the Baptist denomination after she joined the New Hope Baptist Church at around age 19, where she became minister of music and would continue to do so for over the next 50 years.

== Career ==
=== The Drinkard Singers ===
Houston first began singing in the sibling jubilee quartet, the Drinkard Four, at the age of five. A little while later, they changed the name to the Drinkard Jubilairs and then, after the inclusions of sisters Lee and Marie ("Reebie") by 1943, the Drinkard Singers.

Houston contended in both her 1998 memoirs, How Sweet the Sound: My Life with God and Gospel and her 2013 book, Remembering Whitney: A Mother's Story of Love, Loss and the Night the Music Died, that the group didn't sing professionally until radio announcer Joe Bostic hired them to open for Clara Ward and Mahalia Jackson at the first ever gospel showcase, named the "Negro Gospel and Religious Music Festival" at Carnegie Hall in October 1951. Not long after that, the group sang on Bostic's Gospel Train New York radio show, becoming regulars on the program. During this period, the group recorded several singles for Savoy Records and toured at various churches throughout the Eastern Seaboard.

During this time, Houston was romantically involved with Sam Cooke, then lead singer of the Soul Stirrers and the two were even engaged at one point but eventually Houston broke it off because Cooke was "wild".

In October 1957, the group, which now included Judy Clay, joined Sister Rosetta Tharpe and Mahalia Jackson as one of several gospel acts to perform at the Newport Jazz Festival, leading to appearances on a live album recorded at the festival that year.

Shortly after the Newport performance, they landed a recording deal with RCA Victor Records where they recorded and released the album, A Joyful Noise, in 1958, which made history as one of the first gospel albums to be released on a major label.

By the early 1960s, the group landed on the Sunday morning television gospel show, TV Gospel Time. By the end of 1963, however, the group had permanently split due to the other Drinkard members settling with their families and Houston's growing career as a session vocalist for secular recording artists.

=== The Sweet Inspirations ===
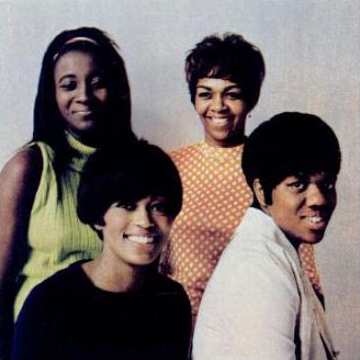
Cissy (top right) with the Sweet Inspirations in 1967.

By the early 1960s, Houston's nieces Dionne and Dee Dee and their friends Sylvia Shemwell, Myrna Smith and Gloria Harding had found success under the group the Gospelaires, singing background for various artists including the Drifters. One night, around September 1961, when Dionne Warrick began working with Scepter Records on demo recordings for the Shirelles, Houston's then-boyfriend, John Houston Jr., who managed the Gospelaires, convinced Houston to replace Dionne in a recording session for Canadian-American rockabilly singer Ronnie Hawkins. After John Houston showed her the money she had made from the session, Houston was convinced to begin a professional singing career as a session vocalist and quit working at RCA Electronics.

The group soon found themselves singing for artists such as Solomon Burke, Ben E. King and the Drifters. Dionne Warrick (who later changed her last name to Warwick) departed from the group permanently after being discovered by composer Burt Bacharach and subsequently started her solo career in 1962 followed by Gloria Harding. The remaining lineup of Cissy, Dee Dee, Smith and Shemwell backed Warwick on her first solo hit, "Don't Make Me Over".

In 1963, Houston and her nieces Dionne and Dee Dee sang background on Kai Winding's original rendition of "Time Is On My Side". Estelle Brown, then aged 19, joined the group in 1965 after Dee Dee embarked on a solo career. During this busy period, the group backed several acts such as Garnet Mimms, Doris Troy, Solomon Burke, Wilson Pickett and Jackie DeShannon.

In 1967, the group was hired to back Irish soul singer Van Morrison on his composition, "Brown Eyed Girl", produced by Bert Berns. After the song hit the top ten that year, Jerry Wexler of Atlantic Records offered the group a recording contract of their own and advised them to change their name from "The Group" to "the Inspirations". Only after learning that another group had that name, singer Chuck Jackson added "Sweet" in front of their name. Following the release of their first single, a cover of "Why Am I Treated So Bad" by the Staple Singers, the group began touring the Chitlin' Circuit.

Their first album, The Sweet Inspirations, charted, reaching number 90 on the Billboard 200 and number 12 on the Billboard Best-Selling R&B Albums chart, producing three Billboard Hot 100 singles, including "Sweet Inspiration", which reached number 18 on the Hot 100 and number 5 on the Best Selling R&B Singles chart and later earned the group a Grammy Award nomination for Best Rhythm & Blues Performance by a Duo or Group at the 11th Annual Grammy Awards in 1969, losing to "Cloud Nine" by the Temptations.

During this period, they backed up Aretha Franklin on a series of hit singles such as "Think", "(You Make Me Feel Like A) Natural Woman", "(Sweet Sweet Baby) Since You've Been Gone" and "Ain't No Way", the latter of which would feature Houston's descant in the background. The group would also back Franklin during her concerts of this period and also occasionally appeared on TV with Franklin as they did on The Jonathan Winters Show.

In addition, the group backed psychedelic rocker Jimi Hendrix on his song, "Burning of the Midnight Lamp", which was later featured on Hendrix's final studio album during his lifetime, Electric Ladyland and would also back up more artists such as Otis Redding, Lou Rawls and Dusty Springfield.

In July 1969, the group was hired to back up Elvis Presley on the rocker's first live performances in almost a decade at the International Hotel. Presley often introduced them at the shows by saying, "They really live up to their name, ladies & gentlemen: The Sweet Inspirations!" During shows, Houston would sometimes sing her soprano obligatos so much during the concerts that it amused Presley, who gave her the affectionate nickname of "Squirrely".

The original Sweet Inspirations with Houston could be heard on the Presley live albums, All Shook Up and Live in Las Vegas. By September 1969, Houston had grown tired of performing on the road as her three children were growing up. That month, she decided to quit the Sweet Inspirations and stop touring to stay at home while also settling on a solo career.

Houston would continue to mentor the remaining members at her home in East Orange, New Jersey and occasionally reunite with them during recording sessions, usually backing Franklin, who was by now a family friend and considered an honorary aunt to Houston's three children, all of whom affectionately nicknamed her "Aunt Ree".

=== Solo career ===
==== Secular career ====
Houston first recorded solo in 1963, cutting her first solo R&B record, "This Is My Vow" on M'n'M Records under the name Cecily Blair. Three years later, in a one-off deal with Congress Records, she released the single "Bring Him Back" b/w "World Of Broken Hearts" (1966). Her final 1960s solo single before recording with the Sweet Inspirations was "Don't Come Running To Me" b/w "One Broken Heart For Sale" released on Kapp Records in 1967. On most of these early singles, her name is spelled as "Sissie Houston".

In 1970, Houston signed a recording contract with Commonwealth United Records and recorded her solo debut LP Presenting Cissy Houston which was released in 1970. It contained several well received singles, including covers of "I'll Be There" and "Be My Baby", both of which made the Billboard R&B charts as well as the Billboard Hot 100. Following the release of the album, Houston's contract was sold to Janus Records.

She recorded another album and several more singles in the early 1970s, which included the original recording of Jim Weatherly's "Midnight Train to Georgia" in 1972, which was a minor hit for Houston, and later became a number one hit for Gladys Knight & the Pips.

Starting around 1973, Houston began regularly performing all over Manhattan's jazz and cabaret clubs, headlining at venues such as Sweetwaters, Fat Tuesday, Reno Sweeney, Seventh Avenue South and Mikell's and would regularly perform at the venues up until the mid-1980s.

Houston continued to record with Janus Records until 1975. In 1976, Houston was featured in Gospel Fuse, a gospel opera composed by Carman Moore and performed with the San Francisco Symphony orchestra, conducted by Seiji Ozawa.

In 1977, Houston was signed by Private Stock Records, working with Michael Zager on three albums. The first, a self-titled effort produced two modest hits, including a soulful, gospel-influenced rendition of "Tomorrow". The second included her big disco hit "Think It Over", which climbed to number 32 on the Billboard Hot Selling Soul Singles chart in 1979 and number 5 on the same magazine's Disco Action Top 80 chart. The song was later successfully covered by singer Jennifer Holliday in 2000; Holliday's version topped the same chart, making her and daughter Whitney the only mother and daughter to have number one dance hits as a songwriter.

The success of "Think It Over" gave Houston a strong and loyal gay following. Houston's daughter Whitney, who began backing her mother during Houston's performances in this period, later recalled to the LGBTQ publication, Out:

"My mother's best, most beautiful, brightest audience was gay men. We used to work at Reno Sweeney [a trendsetting, '70s Manhattan cabaret]. My mother used to pack that club out. I mean, the queens would be around the corner! Around the corner in a line, waiting to see Miss Cissy. I watched the way my mother dealt with gay people. They could tell her anything and she wouldn't trip. She'd be like [adopting a sassy, worldly voice] 'If so-and-so don't treat you right, fuck 'em. Leave 'em and move on to the next thang.' It was about relationships and loving each other. My mother was an inspiring singer. She sang from her heart about love, the tragedies, the ups, downs, the all-arounds of love, and she somehow made you feel like you'd come out triumphant, no matter what. This had a strong hold for gay people. She'd come out in her slippers and sing. They'd love that. 'Sing, Miss Cissy!' She was real."

That same year, Houston represented the United States at the World Popular Song Festival in Tokyo, Japan with the song, "You're the Fire", landing second place during its Grand Prix contest behind Bonnie Tyler and winning the "Most Outstanding Performance Award". The song later appeared on her 1980 disco-flavored album, Step Aside for a Lady, again produced by Zager, but released on Columbia Records after Private Stock had folded (the same album was released on EMI in the United Kingdom).

==== Later career ====
In 1983, Houston took part in the Off-Broadway musical Taking My Turn, which received a Drama Desk Award nomination for Outstanding Musical, often singing the song "I Am Not Old". In 1987, 53-year-old Houston performed the gospel hymn, "Mary Don't You Weep", at the first annual Soul Train Music Awards.

In 1992, she recorded the duet album, I'll Take Care of You, with fellow soul singer and longtime friend Chuck Jackson, on Shanachie Records. It would be Houston's final secular release as she put her focus primarily on gospel music afterwards. In 1996, after signing with the independent House of Blues label, Houston released the gospel album, Face to Face, which featured a gospel rendition of Marvin Gaye's "How Sweet It Is (To Be Loved By You)". Houston would win her first Grammy Award at the 1997 Grammy Awards under the Best Traditional Gospel Album category, which made her and Whitney only one of two mother-daughter acts to win a Grammy, the other being Judy Garland and Liza Minnelli.

In 1997, Houston released a second album of gospel work, He Leadeth Me, for a one-off A&M Records deal, and won a second Grammy in the Best Traditional Gospel Album category for that album at the 1999 Grammy Awards.

In June 2012, Houston sang "Bridge over Troubled Water" at the BET Awards as a tribute to her daughter Whitney, who had passed away that February. Her performance elicited emotional responses from the audience and ended with Houston receiving a standing ovation. That same year, the 78-year-old performer released her tenth and final studio album, Walk on By Faith, on Harlem Records.

In addition to being the minister of music at New Hope Baptist Church, Houston was also a driving force behind McDonald's Gospelfest, at which she regularly performed at up until 2017.

==== Work with Whitney Houston ====
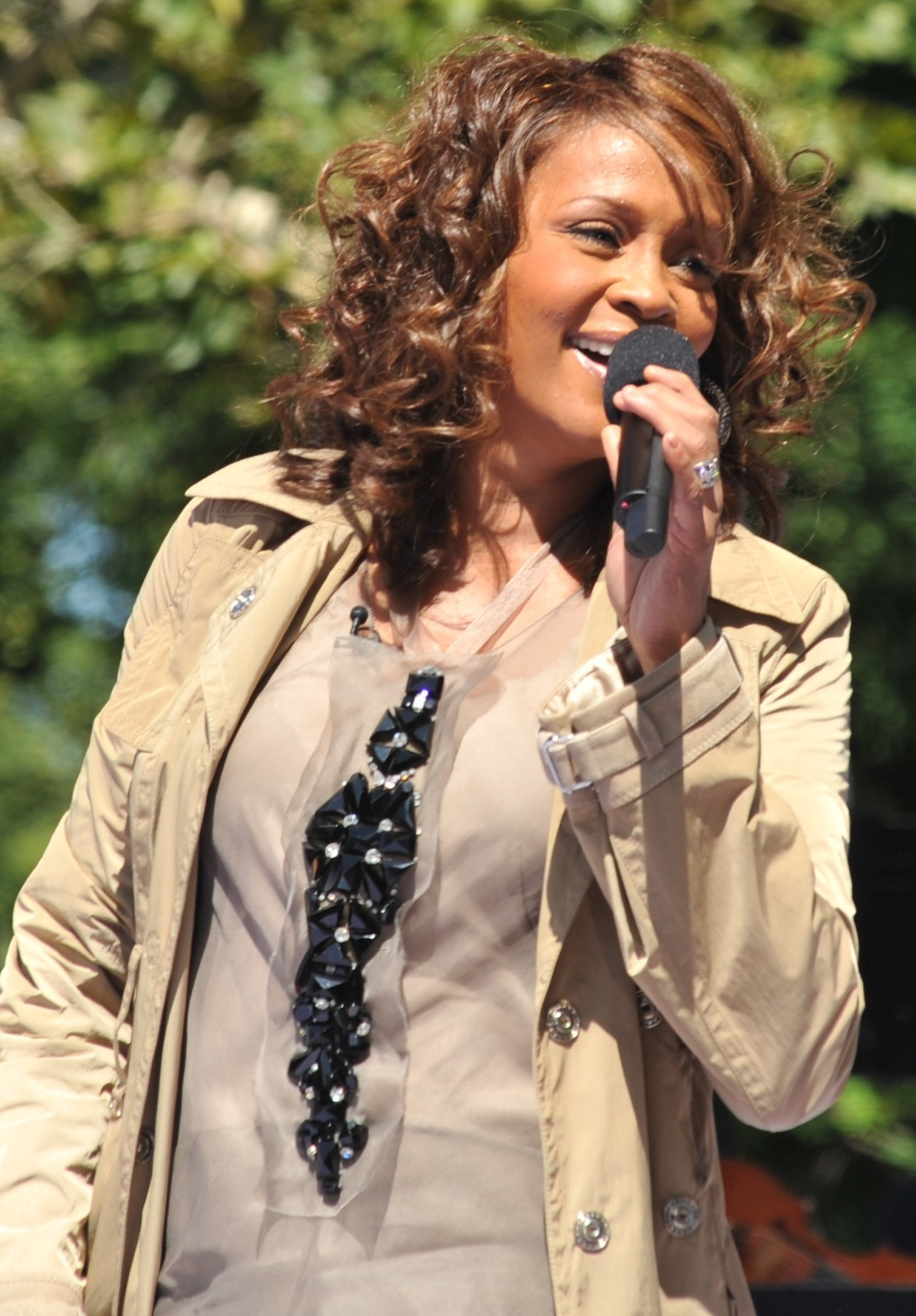
Houston's daughter Whitney Houston was mentored by Cissy during her adolescence and teenage years.

Houston began mentoring her daughter Whitney Houston in the mid-1970s when Whitney was around her preteens to help her get started in the record business. Through Cissy's mentorship, Whitney began regularly performing solos at New Hope Baptist Church.

Cissy later admitted that her hard training, which she learned from her elder sister Reebie, made her a "cruel taskmaster". Said Whitney in 1998: "she could embarrass you so badly. You'd feel like you just wanted to slide under the chair and crawl away. She's good at that." Houston admitted later that she "felt bad about it" and cried when reminiscing but noted "she learned what she had to learn."

Through Houston, Whitney entered the Garden State Competition in the summer of 1977, aged thirteen, finishing in second place.

Following the competition, Whitney became a regular background singer in her mother's band. In February 1978, Whitney with help from her mother sang her first non-church solo lead at Manhattan's The Town Hall.

That same year, Whitney began her career as a session vocalist, singing background on most of her mother's songs on the album, Think It Over. Producer Michael Zager included Whitney in her first professional recorded lead in the disco song "Life's a Party".

To test Whitney's potential as a performer, Houston once told her daughter through the phone while preparing a gig in Mikell's one night around 1980 that she had developed a sore throat and couldn't sing and told her then 17-year-old daughter to take her place.

Though Whitney initially didn't wanna do it, Houston convinced her to take the gig in her place; Houston's husband later reported to her that Whitney's performance was a huge success with many at Mikell's later telling her the young singer "was already acting like a seasoned veteran".

In 1995, Whitney Houston recalled the performance and its aftermath telling the Los Angeles Times that her mother had feigned her illness with Houston telling her, "Well, I was kinda sick, but I really had to show you that you could do this and if that’s what you want, you have to go do it.'"

By 1980, mother and daughter were regularly backing up musicians such as Lou Rawls, Chaka Khan, Herbie Mann and the Neville Brothers. When Whitney began attracting attention from record label scouts offering contracts, Houston would decline such offers, telling them to wait until Whitney finished high school.

It was Houston who eventually convinced her daughter to sign with Arista Records in the spring of 1983, figuring that label head Clive Davis was the right man to guide her daughter's career.

Shortly after Whitney signed with Arista, Cissy was featured on TV with her daughter following Whitney's national television debut on The Merv Griffin Show, where mother and daughter performed a medley of Aretha Franklin duets with Whitney singing "Aretha" and Houston singing "Cissy".

In 1985, Houston was featured on Whitney's number-one hit "How Will I Know" from her self-titled debut album. A year later, Cissy was famously featured in Whitney's popular music video for her 1986 number-one hit, "Greatest Love of All", which was shot at the Apollo Theater. In 1987, Houston recorded a rendition of "I Know Him So Well" from the musical Chess as a duet with her now superstar daughter on the latter's album, Whitney. The duet became a hit in several European countries. Mother and daughter performed the song together on Whitney's HBO concert special, Classic Whitney: Live from Washington, D.C. a decade later. She also sang background on one of Houston's biggest hits, "I Wanna Dance with Somebody (Who Loves Me)".

Houston would join her daughter onstage on other occasions including the Nelson Mandela 70th Birthday Tribute concert at London's Wembley Stadium performing a duet of the gospel standard, "He/I Believe", which Cissy had recorded on her 1970 debut solo album and a song Whitney regularly performed at concerts.

Earlier that year, Cissy joined Whitney and son Gary Garland onstage at the 15th annual American Music Awards, performing a stirring rendition of "Wonderful Counselor", resulting in a standing ovation from the audience. In 1989, Houston was appointed as the CEO of her daughter's humanitarian organization, the Whitney Houston Foundation for Children.

In 1990, Cissy sang backup on the track "Who Do You Love", written and produced for Whitney by their mutual friend Luther Vandross on Whitney's hit album, I'm Your Baby Tonight.

In 1993, Houston was one of several notable women featured in her daughter's music video to her hit rendition of "I'm Every Woman" off Whitney's hugely successful soundtrack to The Bodyguard. The video later won Whitney an NAACP Image Award for Outstanding Music Video in 1994.

In 1996, Cissy won a brief acting role as Mrs. Havergal in Whitney's 1996 comedy film, The Preacher's Wife and contributed to its successful soundtrack, singing "The Lord is My Shepherd", the sole non-Whitney song on the album, though produced by her daughter. In 2006, she contributed vocals on the song "Family First" alongside her daughter Whitney, granddaughter Bobbi Kristina Brown and nieces Dionne Warwick and Dee Dee Warwick for the soundtrack to Daddy's Little Girls.

==== Session musician ====
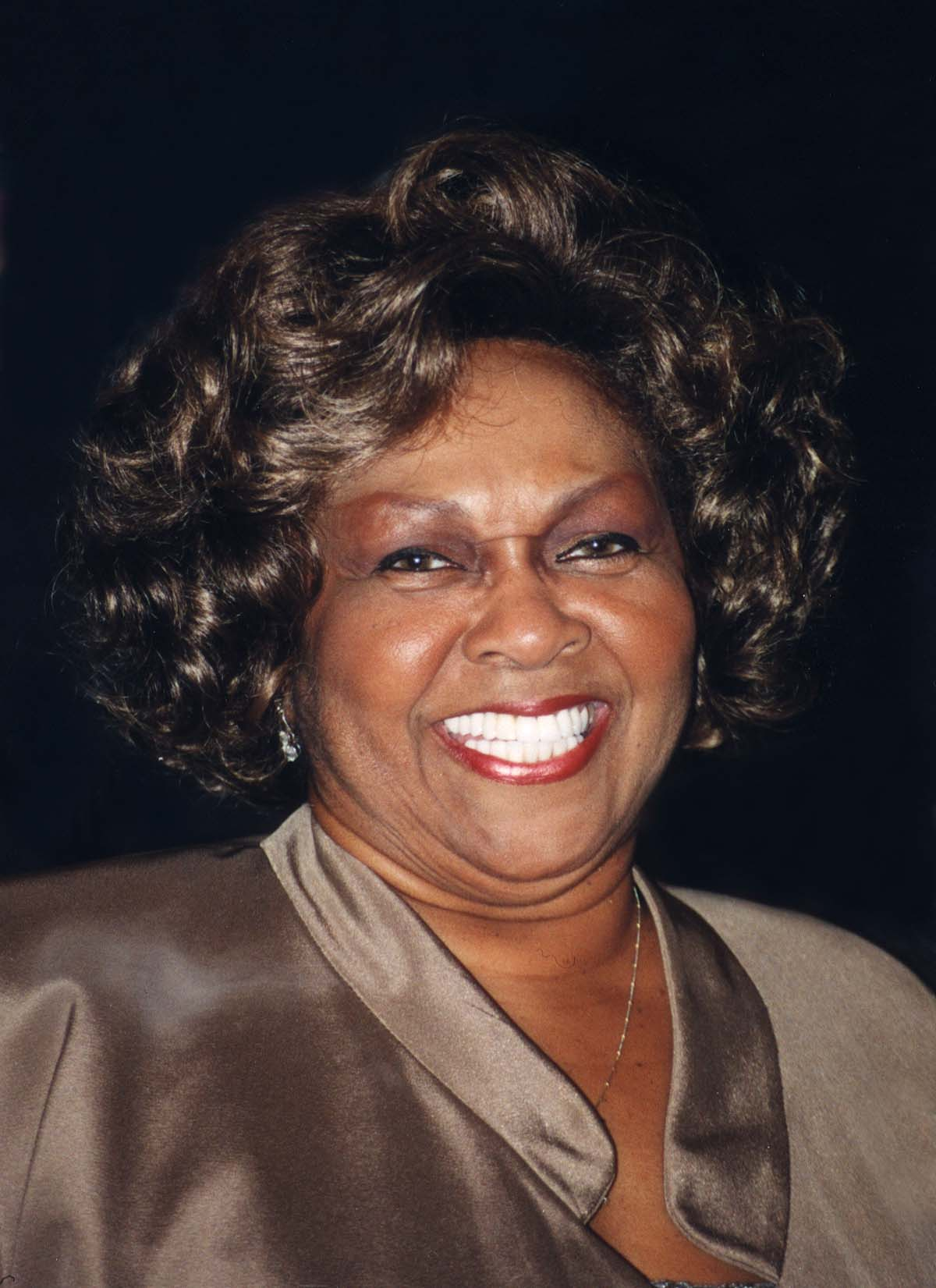
Houston in 1996

Houston's cross-genre singing style kept her highly in demand as a session musician with some of the world's most successful recording artists.

She was one of the backup singers on Paul Simon's "Mother and Child Reunion". In 1971, Houston contributed lead vocals on several songs featured on Burt Bacharach's self-titled 1971 gold album including "One Less Bell to Answer", "All Kinds of People" and "Mexican Divorce".

Houston sang back-up on Bette Midler's 1972 debut hit album, The Divine Miss M, as well as Aretha Franklin's 1972 album, Young, Gifted and Black, the latter with the Sweet Inspirations. Two years later, Houston contributed background vocals on Linda Ronstadt's Heart Like a Wheel.

During 1975-76, she worked with jazz flutist Herbie Mann on three Atlantic albums, Discothèque, Waterbed, and Surprises, featuring on three tracks, "Violet Don't Be Blue", JJ Cale's "Cajun Moon", and "Easter Rising".

In 1978, she contributed background vocals on Chaka Khan's self-titled solo debut. Two years later, with daughter Whitney, Houston also sang on Khan's sophomore effort, Naughty. Starting in 1981, Houston would sing background on many of Luther Vandross's recordings that would last throughout Vandross's lifetime. In 1984, Houston was the uncredited female voice singing alongside Teddy Pendergrass on the latter singer's R&B hit "You're My Choice Tonight (Choose Me)", produced by Vandross.

In 1986, Houston joined Vandross, Khan and David Bowie on the song "Underground", which was Bowie's theme song from his film, Labyrinth.

Houston would continue providing background vocals and arrangements into the new millennium, mostly recording with Luther Vandross and Aretha Franklin up until their final recordings. She was prominently featured in the background of Vandross's hits, "I Can Make It Better" and a rendition of "The Closer I Get to You", with Beyoncé.

In 2014, Houston was seen backing up longtime friend Aretha Franklin while Franklin performed her rendition of "Rolling in the Deep" on The Late Show with David Letterman, which went viral due to many online catching 81-year-old Houston looking disengaged and missing vocal cues.

== Personal life ==
Houston married twice. In 1955, she married Fred Garland, with whom she gave birth to her first child, Gary Garland (b. 1957), an NBA basketball player and DePaul University Athletic Hall of Famer. Houston's marriage to Garland ended in divorce in 1959. Houston filed for divorce prior to giving birth to Gary.

Houston met John Russell Houston Jr. in 1958 at the Newark Symphony Hall. The couple had two children: son Michael Houston (b. 1961) and daughter Whitney Houston (1963–2012), a singer who became a worldwide megastar.

Houston recalled first hearing the news of being pregnant with Whitney following the chart debut of Dionne Warwick's "Don't Make Me Over" in December 1962. Cissy remembered being in the recording studio throughout the pregnancy, recalling "whether I was singing on a hard preachin' Solomon Burke record... or we were yelling like banshees in the cool asphalt jungle of the Drifters's 'On Broadway', this was bound to be an interesting child." Whitney was born hours after her mother's Friday recording session at Atlantic Studios; according to Cissy, she was "well past her due date" when Whitney was born.

According to Cissy, she initially didn't believe she had delivered a girl even after John Houston told her, not believing it due to John being a prankster. Only after a female nurse confirmed John's claim did Cissy believe it. Cissy named her daughter after actress Whitney Blake, a co-star of the 1960s sitcom Hazel, and John's mother Sarah Elizabeth Houston. After Whitney's father gave her the nickname "Nippy" due to her rambunctious and mischievous behavior, everyone else including Cissy referred to her under that name.

Later, during Whitney's adolescence, Houston began protecting her from school bullies who were bothering her. Houston took her to New Hope regularly afterwards. Whitney soon enjoyed going to church because, said Houston: "No one was looking at her clothes, no one was jealous of her. New Hope Baptist Church became Whitney's second home."

When Whitney was "thirteen or fourteen", she attended a Pentecostal church down a few blocks from New Hope and remembered "the Holy Spirit coming into that church and just taking over." After that experience, Whitney said she "[accepted] the Savior in my life and in my heart... knowing that He was real. It wasn't fake." Houston later stated, "She never let go of that faith, even through all the turmoil and hard times to come." Though Whitney didn't regularly go to church as an adult, the singer kept praying and kept playing gospel music throughout her life.

Cissy and John Houston married on May 24, (Note: In 1998, Houston wrote that the couple married in 1959 but in 2013, she corrected the year of their marriage to 1964.) 1964, after John's divorce to his first wife Elsie Hamilton was finalized.

First living together at Cissy's apartment located at Newark's Eighth Street, they moved to the city's Wainwright Street shortly after Whitney's birth in 1964. Three years later, the family were witnesses to the Newark race riots in July 1967. In 1970, shortly after securing a solo deal with a $15,000 advancement, the Houstons moved to a suburban neighborhood in East Orange, New Jersey called Dodd Street, known to residents as "Doddtown".

Initially a happy marriage, it turned volatile following John's near-fatal heart attack in September 1976. In 1982, after Whitney graduated from Mount Saint Dominic Academy, the couple separated. They remained married until 1991 after 27 years of marriage. Houston never remarried.

By 1986, after her daughter became a superstar, Cissy and John sold the house and Cissy moved to a condominium in Verona, New Jersey, purchased for her by Whitney.

In the late 1990s, when Houston's daughter Whitney began to struggle with drug addiction, Houston staged several interventions to get her into rehabilitation programs. On one occasion she obtained a court order and the assistance of two sheriffs to intervene, persuading Whitney to undertake treatment at Hope For Women Residential & Therapeutic Services in Atlanta, Georgia.

In her 2013 book, Remembering Whitney: My Story of Love, Loss, and the Night the Music Stopped, Cissy described a scene she encountered during a visit to Whitney and then-husband Bobby Brown's home in 2005 where she saw the walls and door painted with big glaring eyes and strange faces. Cissy then returned with law enforcement and performed an intervention. Whitney would attend recovery and rehabilitation programs up until her death.

=== Whitney Houston's death ===
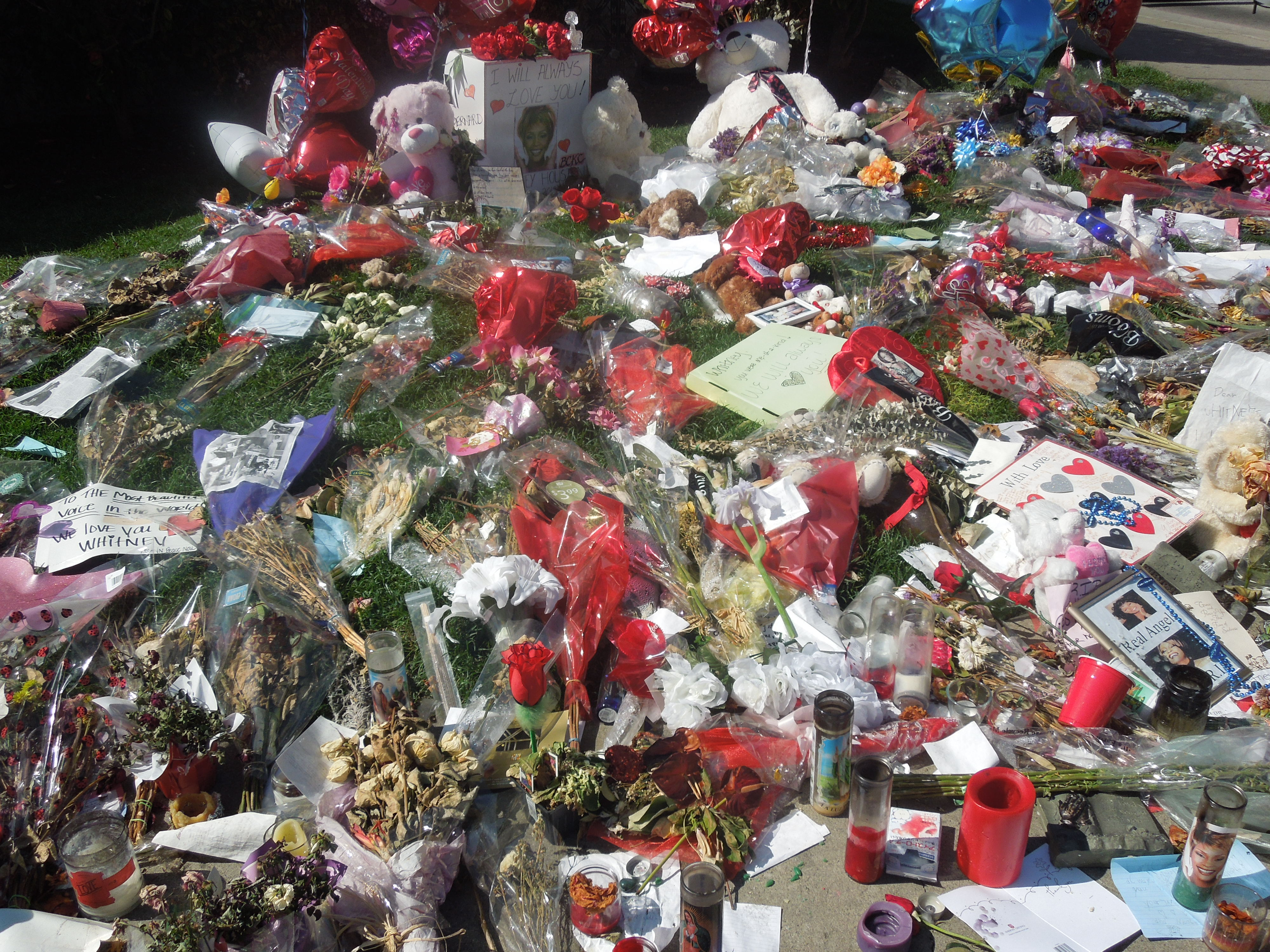
A makeshift vigil of flowers outside the hotel where Whitney Houston passed, February 2012.

On February 11, 2012, Whitney Houston died in her hotel suite at the Beverly Hilton Hotel in Beverly Hills, California, aged 48, after being found submerged from her bathtub. Whitney's untimely death was eventually ruled as an "accidental drowning".

Houston was the last person to speak to Whitney on the phone at the time of her death. Houston later claimed that her daughter "seemed to be fine". Minutes later, Houston later wrote, she heard her doorbell rang at least three times. When she called the concierge from the front desk and asked if anyone had come up to see her, the concierge replied that no one hadn't.

Not long after that, Houston's son Gary called her frantically screaming, "oh Mommy, it's Nippy! It's Nippy!" When a panicked Houston asked Gary if Whitney was dead, Gary replied that she was. Said Houston: "And that was the moment my whole world shattered."

Earlier in the year, Houston remembered Whitney telling her she was going to the Grammy Awards and then would come see her. The singer said she later took solace from the three times her doorbell rang that Whitney had kept her promise to see her.

Cissy helped to organize her daughter's funeral after Whitney's body was flown back to New Jersey. There were rumors spreading that a public memorial service for Whitney would be held at the 18,000-seated Prudential Center. However, Houston turned down that plan, telling people that she "shared Whitney with the public long enough".

Instead, the family agreed to have a more private, invitation-only funeral at New Hope. The decision to do so was to have a more private and intimate memorial to remember her “rather than at a large event or an arena.”

Following the end of the three-hourlong service, Whitney's casket was lifted off by pallbearers as the sound of her famous rendition of "I Will Always Love You" played on the speakers; as the casket was lifted up, Houston could be heard wailing loudly, "my baby, my baby!" She was then carried off tearfully by family members as Whitney's casket left the church.

During the funeral proceedings, attendants received the funeral program in which contained a letter written by Houston.

The letter was later reported by Vibe magazine, which stated in the letter that Houston "always gave without expecting anything in return." The letter also revealed that she never told [Whitney] that when she was born she was told that the singer would not be with her long."

The letter read:

"Dearest Whitney:

The presence of God blessed our home with life, love, joy and peace. You and your brothers were the center of divine love attracting God's richest blessings. You were a child of God. We had so much love in our home that was truly from on high.

You always gave without expecting anything in return and our love was the force that multiplied these blessings higher and higher. I never told you that when you were born the Holy Spirit told me that you would not be with me long and I thank God for the beautiful flower he allowed me to raise and cherish for 48 years.

God said it's time Nippy; your work is done. The other day on February 11th He came for you. But not without warning. For two months now I have been depressed, crying, lonesome and sad not knowing why.

On Saturday, before I found out about your transition, my doorbell rang. I went to answer it but there was no one there. It rang again and again, no one was there so I called the concierge to tell him someone was ringing my doorbell. He checked the cameras and told me that no one was there. You promised me you were coming to spend time with me after the Grammys. I believe the spirits allowed you to come after all.

How I love you Nippy and how I miss you, your beautiful smile, your special little things you used to say to me and sometimes you'd call just to say hi Mommie, I love you so much, I loved you so much more.

I love you, I'll miss you,

Thank you for being such a wonderful daughter.

Rest my baby girl in Peace, you're now in the arms of Jesus."

The singer was buried the following day in Fairview Cemetery, in Westfield, New Jersey, next to her father, John Russell Houston Jr., who had died exactly nine years earlier in February 2003.

After her daughter's death, Houston expressed her dislike for the media's coverage of related events: "The media are awful. People have come from here and there, [and they] don't know what they're talking about," she said. "People I haven't seen in 20 years… Here they come, [they] think they know everything, but that's not true. But God has His way of taking care of all of it, and I'm glad I know that".

=== Granddaughter's death ===
On January 31, 2015, Houston's granddaughter and Whitney's only child, Bobbi Kristina Brown, was found face down in a bathtub in her home in Alpharetta, Georgia. Houston's boyfriend Nick Gordon and a mutual friend began CPR until emergency medical services personnel arrived. According to the police spokesperson, Brown was alive and breathing after being transported to North Fulton Hospital in Roswell, Georgia. At first, they found no evidence to indicate that drugs or alcohol caused the incident, but this was later disputed. Doctors placed Brown in an induced coma after determining her brain function was "significantly diminished", and her family was told a meaningful recovery would be "a miracle".

Brown died in hospice care on July 26, 2015, at age 22. Her death was considered similar to her mother's death, as both had died from effects of being submerged in a bathtub. The initial autopsy found no "obvious underlying cause of death and no significant injuries", and the Fulton County Medical Examiner's office said more tests were forthcoming. A statement released by the family thanked "everyone for their tremendous amount of love and support during these last few months".

=== Houston's statements on Dee Dee Warwick abuse allegations ===
In the 2018 documentary film Whitney, directed by Kevin Macdonald, Whitney Houston's personal assistant Mary Jones claimed Whitney was sexually abused by her cousin and Houston’s niece, Grammy-nominated soul singer Dee Dee Warwick.

Houston's son Gary Garland claimed that at times Warwick babysat for him and his siblings growing up as they were being "shuffled with four or five different families". Gary claimed that between the ages of seven and nine, he was abused by a "female relative" without specifically naming Warwick by name. When asked if he believed his sister was also abused by the same relative, he believed so.

Jones claimed that Whitney didn't tell her mother "out of fear of the repercussions". "I think she was ashamed," said Jones, adding that the abuse made the singer, whose sexuality was heavily debated and discussed over the years, "question her sexual preference".

Warwick's sister Dionne and Houston both expressed doubt regarding the truthfulness of the allegations with Houston saying the claims were “unfathomable”.

In a statement, Cissy wrote:

"We cannot, however, overstate the shock and horror we feel and the difficulty we have believing that my niece Dee Dee Warwick (Dionne’s sister) molested two of my three children, I spent many years in recording studios (sometimes with Dionne and/or Dee Dee) where I earned my living. I also went 'on the road' with my group The Sweet Inspirations to try to help provide a good life for my family BUT my children always came first in my heart and in my life.

When I was away they did not stay with four or five different families; they stayed at home where their longtime babysitter, Phyllis, or my dear friend Bae or their father took care of them. In all the years I traveled, Dee Dee, who was 21 years older than Whitney, NEVER BABYSAT for them.

Dee Dee may have had her personal challenges but the idea that she would have molested my children is overwhelming and for us unfathomable. Neither I, Dionne, nor my son Michael who was very close to his sister, and in the film is VERY candid about their drug use, has ever heard these allegations; we have never heard anything remotely connected to the crimes charged against Dee Dee in the film. How can that be fair to my daughter, to Dee Dee, or to our family?

After people have seen the film they will draw their own conclusions and we are not trying to change that. We just want people to know there is another side. While the filmmakers certainly had the legal right to make this film, I wonder at the moral right."

=== Later years and death ===
In January 2020, Houston's daughter Whitney was announced as one of the inductees into the Rock and Roll Hall of Fame after she was voted in on her first ballot and ten years after she was eligible. That November, alongside her daughter-in-law Pat, Houston accepted Whitney's induction at her Newark residence.

During her acceptance speech on behalf of her late daughter, Houston said "I’m so very, very proud that Whitney’s being inducted into the Rock & Roll Hall of Fame. She wanted to be something, not anything. She worked hard at it too". It would be Houston's last public appearance before her death.

Cissy Houston died at her Newark home on October 7, 2024, at the age of 91. She had been in hospice care for Alzheimer's disease. A star-studded funeral was held at New Hope Baptist Church a week later. There, Houston was honored by niece Dionne Warwick, fellow gospel and R&B musician BeBe Winans, longtime friend and soul singer Darlene Love and son Gary.

Newark mayor Ras Baraka read a proclamation created in her honor and state governor Phil Murphy called Houston a "musical legend" who "embodied the very soul of New Jersey." Following the memorial service, Houston was laid to rest at Fairview Cemetery in Westfield, New Jersey beside her ex-husband John, granddaughter Bobbi Kristina and daughter Whitney.

== Legacy and accolades ==
Following her death in 2024, Houston was acknowledged and recognized in several obituaries. Newark's WGBO radio station held Houston as a "Newark legend who impacted the lives of so many around the world... [spanning] generations and genres from gospel to pop." The New York Times hailed her as a "gifted stylist whose powerful voice and deeply expressed religious faith made her an influential figure in gospel circles for decades."

Robert Darden, a professor of journalism at Baylor University and the author of several books on gospel music, said Ms. Houston was "a significant figure not because she sold a lot of records, but because of the people she influenced who did sell a lot and because of her work as a sustainer and nurturer of the gospel music tradition."

In their obituary, Ebony magazine hailed Houston as a "trailblazer" and stated her "soulful career inspired many and left a lasting impact on R&B and gospel music."

Stephanie Holland of The Root credited Houston as "one of the artists that made gospel music accessible and mainstream".

In 1990, Houston received the Stellar Award of Excellence at the Stellar Awards by her daughter Whitney and the sibling duo BeBe & CeCe Winans.

Five years later, in 1995, Houston was awarded the Pioneer Award for her legendary background vocal work at the Rhythm and Blues Foundation, which was presented to her by Whitney, who sang "His Eye Is on the Sparrow" before calling her mother to the stage.

In 2014, Houston was inducted into the National Rhythm and Blues Hall of Fame as a member of the Sweet Inspirations, the same night her daughter was posthumously inducted into the same hall; an ailing Houston and Estelle Brown were the only surviving members to accept the induction as Sylvia Shemwell and Myrna Smith had died prior to the induction.

A year later, Houston received the Lifetime Achievement Award at the Gospel Image Awards.

On January 27, 2018, Houston was honored by the city of Newark with a day designated in her honor, "Cissy Houston Day", by Newark mayor Ras Baraka and the Newark City Council. That same day, a special street-renaming ceremony happened outside New Hope Baptist Church, where the corner of Dey Street and Sussex Avenue was officially renamed Dr. Emily Houston Plaza.

In 2020, Houston was inducted into the New Jersey Hall of Fame, becoming the third member of her famous family after daughter Whitney and niece Dionne to be inducted.

In 2025, along with Whitney, Houston was inducted into the Gospel Music Hall of Fame Missouri in St. Louis.

== Discography ==
=== Albums ===
==== The Drinkard Singers ====
- 1958: A Joyful Noise (RCA Records/Victor)

==== The Sweet Inspirations ====
- 1967: The Sweet Inspirations (Atlantic)
- 1968: Songs of Faith & Inspiration (Atlantic)
- 1968: What the World Needs Now Is Love (Atlantic)
- 1969: Sweets for My Sweet (Atlantic)

==== Solo ====
- 1970: Presenting Cissy Houston (Major Minor)
- 1977: Cissy Houston (Private Stock)
- 1978: Think It Over (Private Stock)
- 1979: Warning - Danger (Columbia)
- 1980: Step Aside For A Lady (Columbia)
- 1992: I'll Take Care of You (Shanachie)
- 1996: Face To Face (House of Blues)
- 1997: He Leadeth Me (A&M)
- 2001: Love Is Holding You (Neon)
- 2012: Walk on By Faith (Harlem)

==== Compilations ====
- 1995: Midnight Train to Georgia: Janus Years (Ichiban)
- 1999: Cissy Houston & Whitney Houston (Delta Music)
- 2000: The Definitive Collection (Connoisseur)
- 2005: Cissy Houston Collection (Intersound)

=== Singles ===
- 1970: "I'll Be There" (#54 US pop, #20 US R&B)
- 1971: "Be My Baby" (#92 US pop, #31 US R&B)
- 1979: "Think It Over" (#32 US R&B, #5 US dance)

== Filmography ==
=== Film ===
- 1978: The Wiz (uncredited voice) – The Wiz Singers Adult Choir
- 1984: Taking My Turn (TV)
- 1994: The Vernon Johns Story (TV) as Rose
  - aka Freedom Road: The Vernon Johns Story (UK)
  - aka The Road to Freedom: The Vernon Johns Story (USA: alternative title)
- 1996: The Preacher's Wife as Mrs. Havergal
- 2018: God's Not Dead: A Light in Darkness
- 2018: Whitney

=== Television ===
- 1970: The Tonight Show Starring Johnny Carson (3 episodes)
- 1979: Gangsters (herself)
  - aka Hoodlums (USA: video title)
- 1985: Late Night with David Letterman; August 28 episode
- 1986: Ebony/Jet Showcase; October 10 episode
- 1987: The 1st Annual Soul Train Music Awards
- 1988: The 15th Annual American Music Awards
- 1988: Nelson Mandela 70th Birthday Tribute
- 1991: Welcome Home Heroes with Whitney Houston
- 1992: Whitney Houston: This Is My Life
- 1997: Classic Whitney: Live from Washington, D.C.
- 1998: Late Show with David Letterman December 23 episode
- 2001: BET Awards
- 2004: Intimate Portrait Dionne Warwick episode
- 2008: This Time (herself)
- 2012: BET Awards
- 2013: Oprah Prime (Season 2; Episode 50)
- 2013: The Houstons: On Our Own

== Awards and nominations ==
=== Grammy Awards ===
The Grammy Awards are awarded annually by the National Academy of Recording Arts and Sciences. Houston has won 2 awards from 2 nominations.

Year	Award	Nominated work	Result
1997	Best Traditional Soul Gospel Album	Face to Face	Won
1999	Best Traditional Soul Gospel Album	He Leadeth Me	Won

=== Miscellaneous awards and honors ===
Year	Organization	Award	Nominated work	Result
1990	Stellar Award	Stellar Award for Excellence	Herself	Honored
1995	Rhythm and Blues Foundation	Pioneer Award	Herself	Honored
2014	National Rhythm & Blues Hall of Fame		Herself	Inducted
2015	Gospel Image Award	Lifetime Achievement Award	Herself	Honored
2020	New Jersey Hall of Fame		Herself	Inducted
2025	Gospel Music Hall of Fame Missouri		Herself	Inducted

== Bibliography ==
- Bowman, Jeffrey (1994). Diva: The Totally Unauthorized Biography of Whitney Houston. HarperCollins. ISBN 978-1-52474-284-3.
- Houston, Cissy; Singer, Jonathan (1998). How Sweet the Sound: My Life with God and Gospel. Doubleday. ISBN 978-0-38549-010-8.
- Houston, Cissy (2013). Remembering Whitney: My Story of Love, Loss, and the Night the Music Stopped. HarperCollins. ISBN 978-0-06-223839-9.
