= Robyn Crawford =

American author and producer (born 1960)

- Born: December 17, 1960 (age 65); Newark, New Jersey, U.S.
- Spouse: Lisa Hintelmann (m. 2000)
- Children: 2

Robyn Crawford (born December 17, 1960) is an American author, producer, and former assistant to and creative director for Whitney Houston. Her credits include The Bodyguard (1992), Waiting to Exhale (1995), The Preacher's Wife (1996), and Cinderella (1997).

== Early life ==
Crawford was born in Newark, New Jersey, but grew up as one of three siblings in East Orange, New Jersey. Crawford's mother left her father due to his abuse. Both her mother, Janet Crawford, and her brother, Marty, were diagnosed with HIV, and both died of AIDS-related complications in the 1990s.

== Relationship with Whitney Houston ==
Crawford met Whitney Houston in 1980, when Crawford was 19 and Houston was 16. She and Houston met when they were counselors at an East Orange summer camp.

Crawford claims in her 2019 book A Song for You: My Life with Whitney Houston that she had a same-sex relationship with Houston that faded as they prioritized Houston's career. Crawford left school to aid Houston's career. They lived together. Crawford says that she was ostracised and sidelined by Houston's family and management as Houston's fame grew and her career progressed, and when Houston married Bobby Brown. A Song for You: My Life with Whitney Houston became a New York Times Best Seller.

== Personal life ==
Crawford lives in New Jersey with her wife Lisa Hintelmann, with whom she adopted twins. Lena Waithe has cited Crawford as an early inspiration.

== Filmography ==
Year	Title	Role
1987	In Between	Script supervisor
1992	The Bodyguard	Executive assistant to Whitney Houston
1995	Waiting to Exhale	Executive assistant to Whitney Houston
1997	Cinderella	Associate producer
2017	Kevyn Aucoin: Beauty & the Beast in Me	Herself
2017	Whitney: Can I Be Me	Herself (archival footage)
2018	Whitney	Herself (archival footage)

=== In print ===
- Oprah Magazine
- The Advocate
- Essence

=== Podcasts ===
Date	Show	Episode	Role
Dec. 26, 2019	NPR's 1A	"'She Had Me, I Had Her:' Robyn Crawford Opens Up"	Guest
Nov. 20, 2019	LGBTQ&A	"Robyn Crawford: My Life With Whitney Houston"	Guest
Nov. 12, 2019	Yes, Girl!, an Essence podcast	"Nobody Loved Whitney Like Robyn Crawford - The Interview You've Been Waiting For"	Guest

== Autobiography ==
- A Song for You. My Life With Whitney Houston. Dutton. 2019. ISBN 9781524742843.
