= I'll Be There (Bobby Darin song) =

Song by Bobby Darin

Single by Gerry and the Pacemakers
- B-side: "Baby You're So Good to Me"
- Released: March 1965
- Recorded: November 10, 1964, Abbey Road, London
- Genre: Pop
- Label: Columbia (UK); Laurie (US); Capitol (Canada)
- Songwriter: Bobby Darin
- Producer: George Martin

Gerry and the Pacemakers singles chronology
"Ferry Cross the Mersey" (1964)	"I'll Be There" (1965)	"Walk Hand in Hand" (1965)

"I'll Be There"

Song by Elvis Presley

from the album Let's Be Friends
- Released: April 1970
- Recorded: 23 January 1969
- Length: 2:21
- Label: RCA Camden
- Songwriter: Bobby Darin

"I'll Be There" is a song written and originally recorded by Bobby Darin in 1960. It was first released as B-side to his single "Bill Bailey" (ATCO 6167). As such it entered the Billboard charts on July 11, 1960, and reached position 79.

== Gerry and the Pacemakers recording ==
First recorded in 1963, on the Laurie label. Invariably used as the epilogue song at The Cavern Club, it became a Canadian number one hit for one of its bands, Gerry and the Pacemakers. (The US and UK singles were different recordings.)

== Chart performance ==
Chart (1964–65)	Peak position
Canadian RPM Top Singles	1
UK Singles (The Official Charts Company)	15
US Billboard Hot 100	14

== Other cover versions ==
- Elvis Presley recorded a cover version in early 1969. The song was released in April 1970 as the first track on side two of Presley's LP Let's Be Friends. The song features many big band arrangements and an extended jazzy instrumental section. The track runs 2:21.
- Cissy Houston (a 1970 single)
- Cass Elliot, on her album Cass Elliot (1972).

== Use in other media ==
- The song was performed by Daveigh Chase in the episode, "D.I.V.O.R.C.E.", of the television series Big Love.
