= Gary Garland =

American basketball player

Personal information
- Born: October 12, 1957 (age 69) Newark, New Jersey, U.S.
- Listed height: 6 ft 4 in (1.93 m)
- Listed weight: 180 lb (82 kg)

Career information
- High school: Clifford J. Scott (East Orange, New Jersey)
- College: DePaul (1975–1979)
- NBA draft: 1979: 2nd round, 30th overall pick
- Drafted by: Denver Nuggets
- Position: Point guard
- Number: 24

Career history
- 1979–1980: Denver Nuggets
- Stats at NBA.com
- Stats at Basketball Reference

Gary Joseph Garland Houston (né Garland; born October 12, 1957) is an American musician and former professional basketball player.

== Basketball career ==
Garland played in college for the DePaul Blue Demons under coach Ray Meyer. Garland was a member of the 1979 DePaul Final Four team that lost to Larry Bird’s Indiana State Sycamores in the national semifinals.

Houston played for the Denver Nuggets in the National Basketball Association (NBA). He played one season with the Nuggets (1979–80).

== Personal life ==
Gary is the half-brother of singer Whitney Houston and also half-brother to Michael Houston. Gary, Michael, and Whitney are the children of singer Cissy Houston. Gary is the cousin of singers Dionne Warwick and Dee Dee Warwick and the uncle of Bobbi Kristina Brown, Whitney's daughter with singer Bobby Brown.

== Singing career ==
Garland has toured several times as a background singer and an occasional duet partner with Whitney Houston.

After his professional basketball career concluded, Garland participated with Houston on her Greatest Love Tour in 1986 as a background/duet vocalist, which led to a continuous work relationship with Houston. He performed as a background singer in several of Houston's tours throughout the 1980s, 1990s, 2000s, with 2010's Nothing But Love Tour being the final such tour.

Whitney Houston tours that included Gary Garland

- The Greatest Love World Tour (1986)
- Moment of Truth World Tour (1987–88)
- I'm Your Baby Tonight World Tour (1991)
- The Bodyguard World Tour (1993–94)
- Pacific Rim Tour (1997)
- The European Tour (1998)
- My Love Is Your Love World Tour (1999)
- Soul Divas Tour (2004)
- Nothing But Love World Tour (2010)

== Career statistics ==
Legend
GP	Games played	GS	Games started	MPG	Minutes per game
FG%	Field goal percentage	3P%	3-point field goal percentage	FT%	Free throw percentage
RPG	Rebounds per game	APG	Assists per game	SPG	Steals per game
BPG	Blocks per game	PPG	Points per game	**Bold**	Career high

=== NBA ===
==== Regular season ====
Year	Team	GP	MPG	FG%	3P%	FT%	RPG	APG	SPG	BPG	PPG
1979–80	Denver	78	14.2	.435	.316	.692	1.8	1.9	.7	.1	4.3
