= Jennifer Holliday discography =

- Studio albums: 6
- Live albums: 1
- Compilation albums: 4
- Singles: 24

American singer Jennifer Holliday has released six studio albums, four compilation albums, one live album, and twenty-four singles.

== Albums ==
=== Studio albums ===
Title	Album details	Peak chart positions				
Title	Album details	US	US R&B	US Gospel	US Indie	SWE
Feel My Soul	Released: October 3, 1983; Label: Geffen; Formats: LP, cassette	31	6	—	—	24
Say You Love Me	Released: August 19, 1985; Label: Geffen; Formats: LP, cassette	110	34	—	—	—
Get Close to My Love	Released: August 18, 1987; Label: Geffen; Formats: CD, LP, cassette	—	—	—	—	26
I'm on Your Side	Released: July 23, 1991; Label: Arista; Formats: CD, LP, cassette	184	29	—	—	41
On & On...	Released: November 8, 1994; Label: Intersound; Formats: CD	—	—	10	—	—
The Song Is You	Released: January 21, 2014; Label: Shanachie; Formats: CD, digital download	—	27	—	46	—

=== Compilation albums ===
Title	Album details	Peak chart positions
Title	Album details	US R&B
The Best of Jennifer Holliday	Released: September 10, 1996; Label: Geffen; Formats: CD	50
20th Century Masters – The Millennium Collection: The Best of Jennifer Holliday	Released: October 3, 2000; Label: Geffen; Formats: CD	—
Goodness & Mercy	Released: April 19, 2011; Label: Euphonic / New Day Christian; Formats: CD, digital download	—
Fresh Takes	Released: May 4, 2018; Label: Light; Formats: Digital download	—

=== Live albums ===
- Love Songs: Live at the Catalina Jazz Club (2025)

== Singles ==
Title	Year	Peak chart positions				Album
Title	Year	US	US R&B	US Dance	UK Pop	Album
"And I Am Telling You I'm Not Going"	1982	22	1	—	32	Dreamgirls - OBC
"I Am Changing"	1982	—	29	—	—	Dreamgirls - OBC
"I Am Love"	1983	49	2	—	—	Feel My Soul
"Just Let Me Wait"	1983	—	24	43	—	Feel My Soul
"Hard Time for Lovers"	1985	69	17	26	82	Say You Love Me
"No Frills Love"	1985	87	29	1	—	Say You Love Me
"Heart on the Line"	1987	—	48	—	—	Get Close to My Love
"I'm on Your Side"	1991	—	10	—	—	I'm on Your Side
"Love Stories"	1991	—	29	—	—	I'm on Your Side
"On & On (Stronger)"	1994	—	—	—	—	On & On...
"To Teach Me"	1994	—	—	—	—	On & On...
"Let Jesus Love You"	1995	—	—	—	—	On & On...
"No Frills Love (Remix)"	1996	—	—	1	—	The Best of Jennifer Holliday
"A Woman's Got the Power"	1999	—	—	7	—	Non-album single
"Think It Over"	2000	—	—	1	—	Non-album single
"And I Am Telling You I'm Not Going" (Rosabel with Jennifer Holliday)	2001	—	—	6	—	Non-album single
"And I Am Telling You I'm Not Going" (Jennifer Holliday with Rosabel)	2007	—	—	10	—	Non-album single
"Givin' Up"	2007	—	—	—	—	Why Did I Get Married? - OST
"God Is Faithful"	2011	—	—	—	—	Goodness and Mercy
"Get Up, Get Ready"	2011	—	—	—	—	Goodness and Mercy
"Hold On"	2012	—	—	—	—	Lysistrata Jones - OST
"Touch"	2014	—	—	—	—	The Song Is You
"Baby, Tonite"	2019	—	—	—	—	Non-album single
"So in Love"	2022	—	—	—	—	Non-album single
"—" denotes a recording that did not chart or was not released in that territory.
