= Think It Over (disambiguation) =

"Think It Over" is a 1958 rock & roll song written by Buddy Holly, Jerry Allison, and Norman Petty.

Think It Over may also refer to:

- "Think It Over" (Cheryl Ladd song) (1978)
- Think It Over (album), a 1978 album by Cissy Houston
  - "Think It Over" (Cissy Houston song), lead single from the album
- "Think It Over" (The Cars song) (1981)
- Think It Over (film), a 2002 Greek film

== See also ==
- Thinking It Over (disambiguation)
- "Think It All Over", 1969 single by Sandie Shaw
