= Early life of Whitney Houston =

Whitney Houston's life from 1963 to 1987

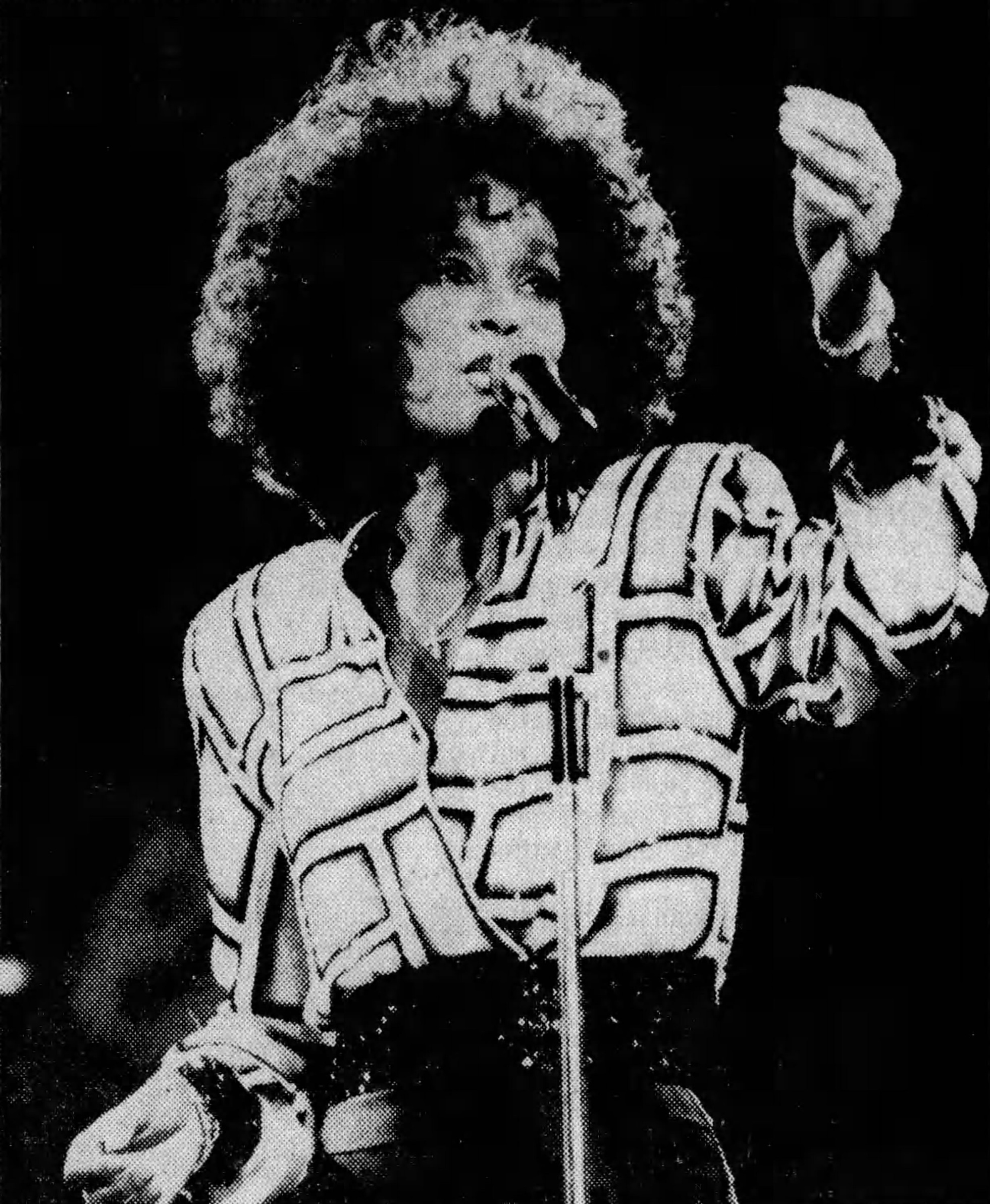
Whitney Houston onstage early in her career, 1987

Whitney Elizabeth Houston (August 9, 1963 – February 11, 2012) was an American singer and actress, commonly referred to as The Voice. The youngest child of American singer Cissy Houston, she was born in Newark, New Jersey, and moved to East Orange, with her family at age seven. Houston began singing at her mother's church, New Hope Baptist Church, and started to lead its junior choir at the age of twelve. At fourteen, Houston entered the music business first as a background singer for her mother during Cissy's cabaret club performances in downtown Manhattan and then as a session vocalist, where she backed industry artists such as Lou Rawls, Chaka Khan and the Neville Brothers among others.

Occasionally during this era, Houston was allowed to take the lead vocal during Cissy's shows and received her first standing ovation at The Town Hall and recorded her first lead vocal with disco music producer Michael Zager at fifteen. In 1980, she began a successful career in modeling, landing the cover of Seventeen in 1981. Houston's music career picked up a year later in 1982 when she recorded full lead vocals on songs by Material and Paul Jabara.

After auditioning for Elektra Records and CBS, Houston eventually signed to Arista Records in 1983. While recording her debut album, she entered the record charts in 1984 with American R&B singer Teddy Pendergrass on the love ballad, "Hold Me” and appeared with Jermaine Jackson on an episode of As the World Turns. Reaction to Houston's debut album upon its release in early 1985 was slow at first but picked up after she performed the single, "You Give Good Love", on The Tonight Show Starring Johnny Carson. Her ascension to superstardom culminated with the success of her Grammy Award-winning debut album and the international success of the 1987 hit "I Wanna Dance with Somebody (Who Loves Me)".

== Childhood in Newark and East Orange ==
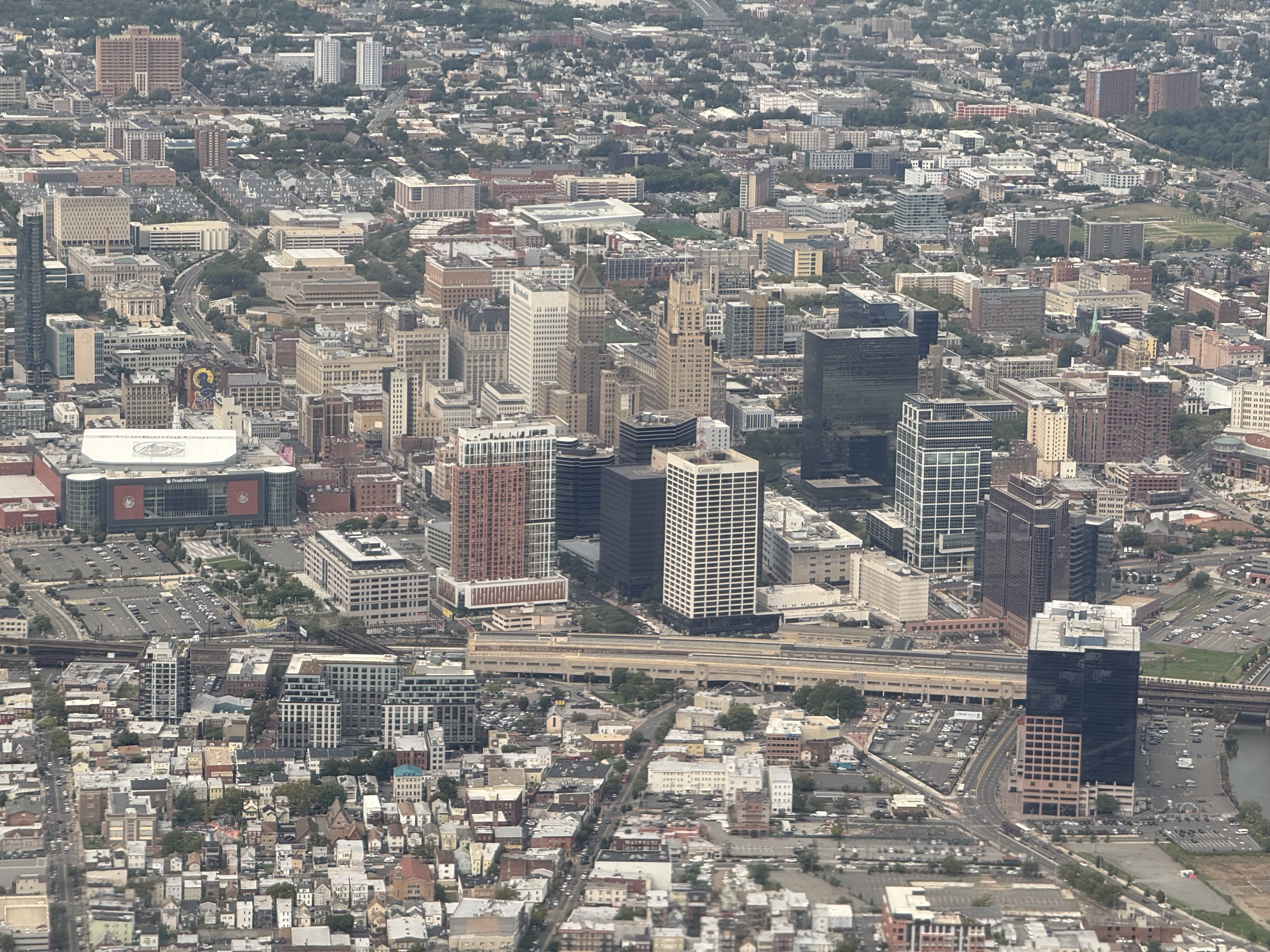
Houston was raised in Newark, New Jersey until she was seven.

Whitney Elizabeth Houston was born on August 9, 1963, in Newark, New Jersey, to Emily Lee "Cissy" (née Drinkard) and John Russell Houston Jr. at Newark Presbyterian Hospital. Houston's mother discovered she was pregnant with her around the same time Houston's cousin Dionne Warwick made her chart debut with the R&B hit "Don't Make Me Over" in December 1962.

On the day of Houston's birth, her mother Cissy was reportedly recording background vocals with the Drifters at Atlantic Studios and was "well past her due date". Upon her arrival, her mother initially didn't believe she had a daughter as she had given birth to two boys. When her then-boyfriend John told her they had a daughter, she felt John was "joking around" until a nurse confirmed the baby's identity.

Houston got her first name from actress Whitney Blake, one of the main stars of the 1960s sitcom, Hazel, one of Cissy's favorite shows to watch at the time, and her middle name from her paternal grandmother Sarah Elizabeth Houston, a schoolteacher in the New York area. (Note: As an adult, Houston used the pseudonym Elizabeth Collins, which was her grandmother’s middle name and maiden surname, to enter hotel rooms.)

Houston's father John was African American with partial Lenape, Wampanoag, Scottish and English descent and was the great-great-grandson of Jeremiah Burke Sanderson, an abolitionist, schoolteacher and civil rights activist. Her mother Cissy was of African American heritage with some English and Irish descent. Cissy once claimed in an interview to have partial Dutch and Native American descent. Houston's maternal descendants were landowners in Blakely, Georgia, one of the few black families to do so at the time. The Drinkards later moved to Newark during the Great Migration in the early 1920s.

Houston was the only daughter and youngest child of her parents; along with two elder half-brothers John Houston III and Gary Garland, born during her parents' previous marriages to Elsie Hamilton and Fred Garland, she was also preceded by another older brother Michael, born exactly two years apart. Houston's maternal relatives were part of a musically gifted family. Alongside Cissy, Houston's first cousins Dionne and Dee Dee Warwick were successful pop and soul singers while operatic soprano Leontyne Price was a distant cousin. Her mother, aunts and two of her uncles formed the gospel group the Drinkard Singers.

Initially living at an apartment at Newark's 8th Street, following her birth, Houston's parents, who officially married in 1964, moved to a middle-class neighborhood in the city called Wainwright Street. As an infant, Houston earned her lifelong nickname "Nippy" from her father; the nickname came from a comic book character Nippy Nibbs, known for getting into mischief. As a fussy baby during winter months, she constantly kicked off her blankets at night. Houston's father would then joked, "Nippy — seldom right".

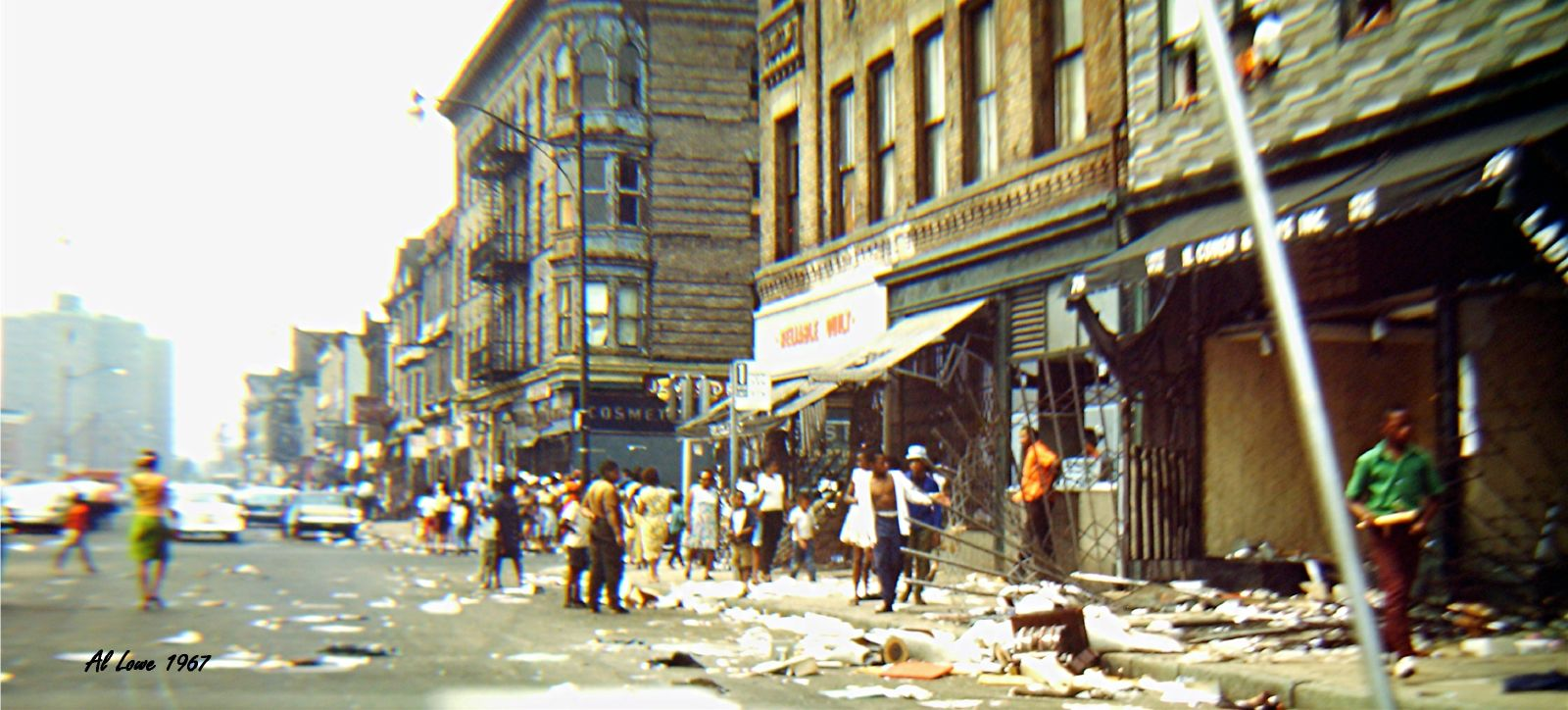
Newark in the aftermath of the Newark race riots in July 1967.

During her early childhood, Houston's mother spent most of her time in recording studios while her father looked after her and her two elder brothers. In 1967, Houston injured her neck after a clothes hanger she was playing with in her mouth got caught near her throat after her brother "wildly gestured" in her direction. Panicked, her father sent her to Beth Israel Hospital in Newark where doctors managed to patch up her wound after finding the hanger had been "within an inch" of severing Houston's vocal cords.

Not long after the incident, the Houston family witnessed the Newark race riots. The singer later recalled eating her dinner on the floor while the city was being engulfed by protesters, police officers and gunfire. The aftermath of the riots left the Houston family in what was quickly becoming an unsafe environment.

That same year, Houston's mother formed the pop-gospel quartet, the Sweet Inspirations. Upon the group making the charts late that year, both Cissy and John, who became the group's manager, were on the road shortly afterwards to bring in much needed income so they could be able to move out of Newark. Before the end of the year, Houston was taken by her mother to Atlantic Studios where she witnessed her mother recording with the likes of Aretha Franklin, Wilson Pickett and Solomon Burke. Houston also witnessed her mother and the Sweet Inspirations performing at venues such as the Philharmonic Hall and the Apollo Theater.

By the time Houston was six, the Sweet Inspirations were regularly performing in Las Vegas with American rock singer Elvis Presley, who was then undergoing a successful comeback to music. However, in September 1969, Cissy Houston left the group to stay more at home with her children and forged on a solo career. In 1970, just as Houston turned seven, the family moved to a two-story Cape Cod-styled home at a suburban East Orange neighborhood called Dodd Street, nicknamed "Doddtown" by its residents and located at the city's First Ward. Their residence's address was 362 Dodd Street.

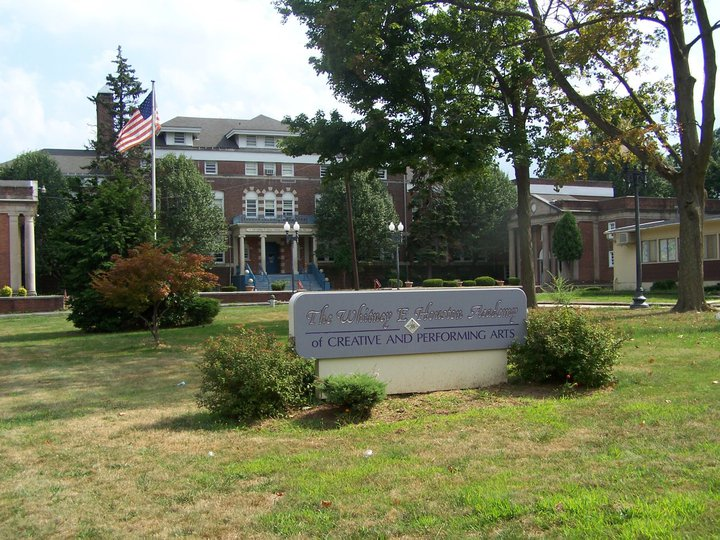
Houston attended this school in East Orange, New Jersey. Its original name was Franklin School. The name was changed to the Whitney E. Houston Academy of Creative and Performing Arts in 1997.

Houston was described by her mother as an easy-going, inquisitive child. However, her behavior changed somewhat when she entered third grade at her school, Franklin School, and she became the target of bullying by darker skinned black girls due to her long haired braids, plaid skirts and lighter complexion. Houston eventually was forced to fight the bullies by her mother.

Houston began to be much more isolated as she got older. In 1987, the singer told Time magazine: "I finally faced the fact that it isn't a crime not having friends. Being alone means you have fewer problems. When I decided to be a singer, my mother warned me I'd be alone a lot. Basically we all are. Loneliness comes with life."

Said her cousin Dionne in the same article of Houston and the entire family: "You don't get in unless we let you in." Houston said years later that her mother told her, "Whitney, sometimes you have to be your own best friend. Sometimes you're better off just being by yourself."

It was around this time that Houston, who began singing in the children's choir of her mother's church, New Hope Baptist Church, began to take refuge in the church. Raised Baptist, it would be while attending a nearby Pentecostal church that Houston later claimed she "[accepted] the Savior in my life and in my heart... knowing that He was real. It wasn't fake." Cissy Houston later stated, "[Whitney would] never let go of that faith, even through all the turmoil and hard times to come."

By her preteen years, Houston told her mother that she wanted to seriously pursue a career in music; Cissy began to give Houston rigorous training in singing and voice control. In November 1975, at 12 years of age, Houston made her public performance solo debut at New Hope singing the church hymn, "Guide Me O Thou Great Jehovah". (Note: In various interviews, Houston sometimes claimed she was 11 when she first sang solos at the church.)

The performance was received well by the congregation. According to the singer, they were "Holy Ghost fired out" from her performance, which further encouraged Houston to pursue a singing career. A year later, the teenager was transferred to an all-girls Catholic school, Mount Saint Dominic Academy, in nearby Caldwell but felt out of place there due to being one of the very few black students there in the predominantly white school. Houston eventually graduated from the school before turning 18.

Around the same time she attended Mount Saint Dominic Academy, Houston's parents' marriage began falling apart following her father John suffering a near fatal heart attack in September 1976. By the time Houston was 18, they had separated.

== Influences and musical development ==
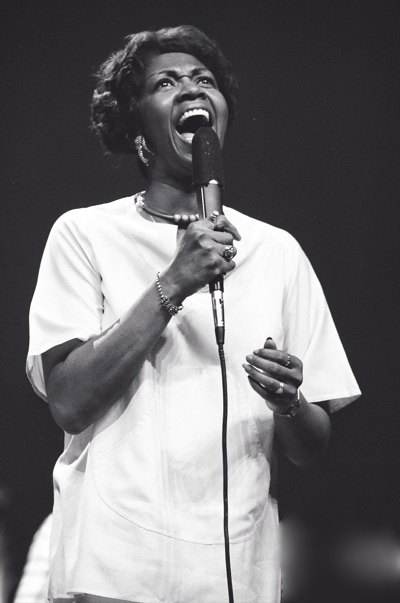
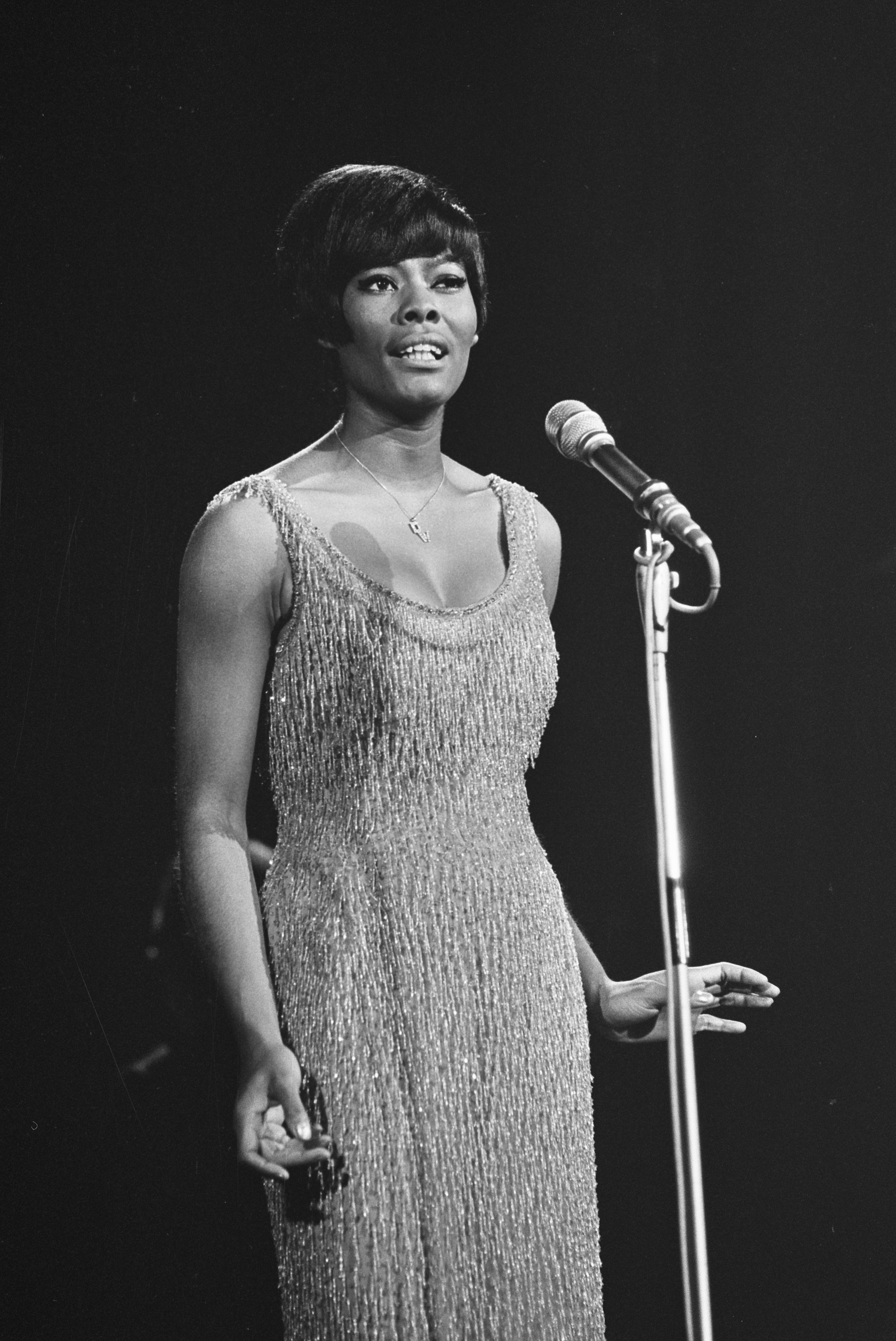
Houston's mother Cissy Houston and cousin Dionne Warwick were her biggest musical influences.

Houston's biggest vocal and musical influence was her mother, Cissy Houston. As she explained to Rolling Stone in 1993, "My mother was the first singer I had contact with. She sang constantly to us around the house, in church. I used to watch her and the feeling . . . my mother always said to me, 'If you don't feel it, then don't mess with it, because it's a waste of time.' When I used to watch my mother sing, which was usually in church, that feeling, that soul, that thing – it's like electricity rolling through you. If you have ever been in a Baptist church or a Pentecostal church, when the Holy Spirit starts to roll and people start to really feel what they’re doing, it's . . . it's incredible. That’s what I wanted."

The singer further added of her mother, "So my mother was my first example that I looked at and said, 'Wow, that voice right there.' And I’m her daughter, so I sound like my mother when my mother was my age, though I truly think my mother has a greater voice than me, because she's the master, I'm the student [laughs]. She has greater range, greater power than I ever did."

Besides her mother, Houston was also heavily influenced by her first cousins Dionne Warwick and Dee Dee Warwick. During her adolescence, Houston often accompanied Dionne to her concerts and took cues from Dionne's showmanship and performance style. Some of Houston's more soulful and gritty vocals were influenced by Dee Dee, to which Dionne called "the singer" in their family prior to Houston's birth. Houston also covered several of cousin Dionne's hits in concert, most notably Warwick's rendition of the Burt Bacharach composition, "Alfie".

Another important musical influence outside her immediate family was Aretha Franklin, who was a family friend and with whom Houston affectionately named "Aunt Ree" or "Auntie Ree". Houston first met Franklin at age four when her mother sang backup for during her tenure with the Sweet Inspirations. Houston and Franklin later recorded the 1989 Grammy-nominated duet "It Isn't, It Wasn't, It Ain't Never Gonna Be". During her performances later in life, Houston often covered Franklin's hits. In 1994, she recorded a cover of the soul singer's 1976 hit, "Look Into Your Heart", from the soundtrack of the movie, Sparkle in a tribute album dedicated to Curtis Mayfield.

As she grew up, Houston would also be heavily influenced by funk singer Chaka Khan. During her adolescence she sang Khan's records in her room. Khan later booked one of Houston's first studio sessions when Houston was 14 and began mentoring the teenager, beginning a friendship that would last throughout Houston's lifetime. According to Houston's lifelong friend Robyn Crawford, Houston raved about Khan, playing the singer's Naughty album to her and would talk about Khan's way of singing. Crawford recalled Houston writing in her notebook that one of her goals was to professionally cover one of Khan's songs. Over a decade later when Houston was seeking songs to record for the soundtrack to The Bodyguard, Crawford reminded her of what she had written years ago on covering Khan. Houston then famously covered Khan's 1978 hit "I'm Every Woman" for the soundtrack.

Besides her mother, the Warwick sisters, Franklin and Khan, Houston was also inspired by other soul and pop singers such as Gladys Knight, Roberta Flack, Darlene Love, Karen Carpenter, Barbra Streisand, the Jackson 5, Tony Bennett, Luther Vandross and Stevie Wonder. Wonder's 1971 single, "If You Really Love Me", was the first musical purchase she made as a child. The two later recorded the duet, "We Didn't Know", in 1990. Other important inspirations included black entertainers Sammy Davis Jr., Lena Horne and Dorothy Dandridge.

During her adolescence and teenage years, Houston's mother helped to mentor and develop her voice though the singer admitted her mother could sometimes be too stern. Cissy later admitted that her hard training, which she learned from her elder sister Reebie, made her a "cruel taskmaster". Said Whitney in 1998: "she could embarrass you so badly. You'd feel like you just wanted to slide under the chair and crawl away. She's good at that." Cissy Houston admitted later that she "felt bad about it" and cried when reminiscing but noted "she learned what she had to learn."

== Early music career ==
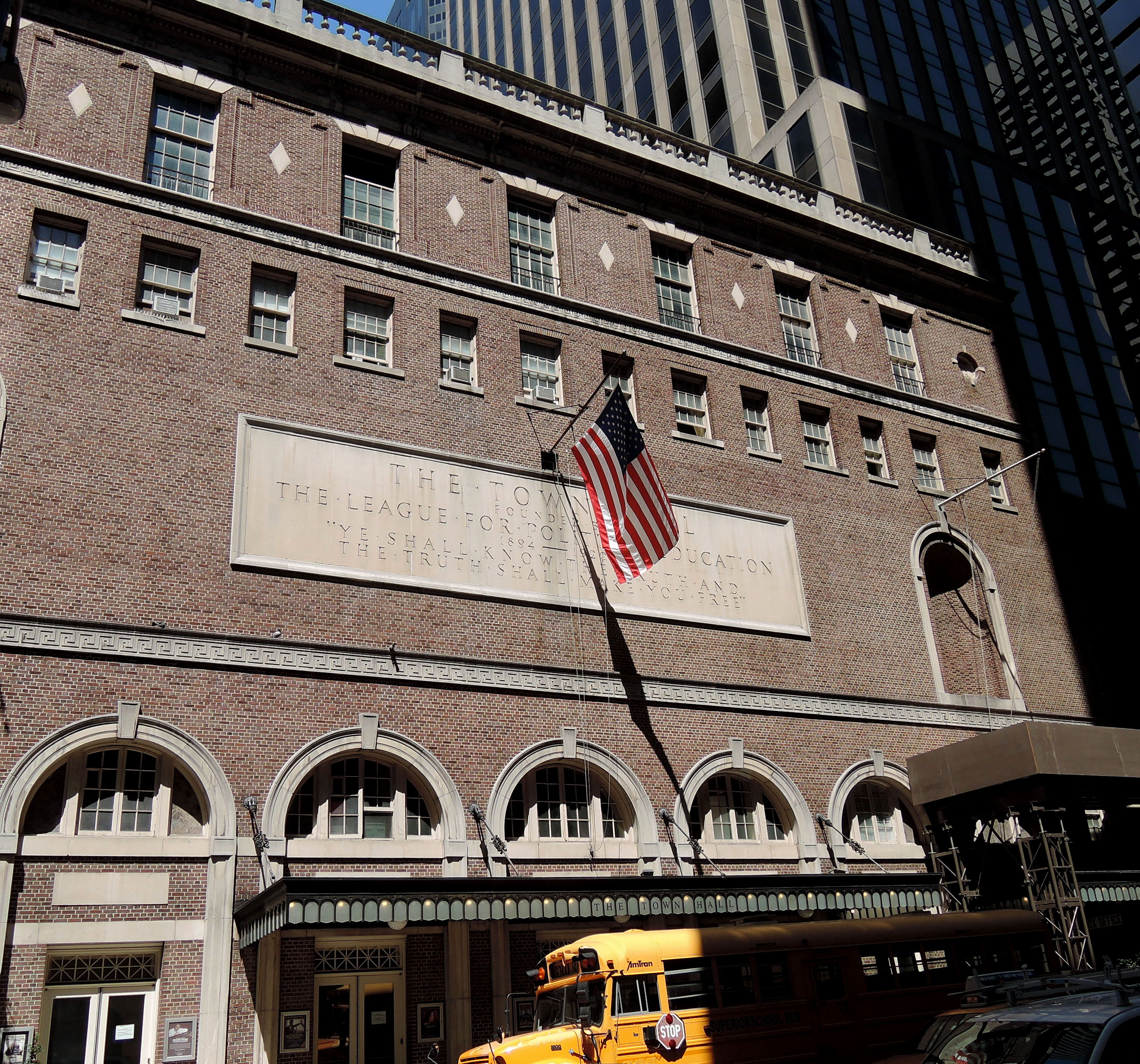
Houston received her first non-church standing ovation at The Town Hall at age fourteen.

In 1977, prior to Houston turning fourteen, her mother entered her in the Garden State Competition. Houston managed to make it to the finals but lost due to singing outside the minute limit. Undeterred, she joined her mother's band as a background vocalist that year as Cissy became a regular performer at several downtown Manhattan cabaret and jazz clubs such as Reno Sweeney, Fat Tuesday, the Bottom Line, Seventh Avenue South and Mikell's.

On February 15, 1978, when Houston was fourteen, at The Town Hall in Manhattan, she took her mother's place during a performance of the song "Tomorrow", from the Broadway musical, Annie, which Cissy had recorded for her 1977 self titled album. Houston's performance was so well received that she was given a standing ovation. Later that year, Houston contributed backing vocals to all but one track on her mother's album, Think It Over, including the hit title track; Houston had replaced a vocalist who got sick prior to the recording.

The producer of the album, Michael Zager, was so impressed that he convinced Cissy to let her sing most of the lead in his disco song "Life's a Party". Further convinced of her being a potential star, Zager later offered Houston a recording contract with Columbia Records in 1980; however, Cissy rebuffed this attempt, stressing that Houston continue to attend school.

Houston was soon singing background on various artists' recordings, including Alvin Fields, Chaka Khan, Lou Rawls, Herbie Mann and the Neville Brothers. It would be during the Khan recording sessions in late 1979 that Houston, aged sixteen, first met Luther Vandross, who was himself a session vocalist at the time. After one session, according to Houston, he handed the teenager a note but told her not to open it until she got home. Upon reading it, Vandross had wrote "you'll be one of the greatest singers who ever lived."

Due to her parents' ties with civil rights activists and black organizations such as the NAACP and UNCF, Houston often found herself performing at several benefit concerts with her mother, including UNCF benefit concerts, debuting at such an event in 1978 at Carnegie Hall, according to People magazine.

In 1980, when Houston was around 17, Cissy Houston convinced her to perform her first full-length show after telling her that she was too sick to carry on a performance at Mikell's. The performance turned out to be successful and after getting Whitney on the phone, her mother told her, "Well, I was kinda sick, but I really had to show you that you could do this and if that’s what you want, you have to go do it." That same year, she sang background on Chaka Khan's top ten 1980 R&B hit, "Clouds".

In 1981, Houston worked on a trio of gospel demos with New Jersey producer Steven Abdul Khan Brown; the three songs Houston worked on with Brown — "Testimony", "He Can Use Me" and "I Found a Wonderful Way" — were remastered and issued on the gospel compilation album, I Go to the Rock: The Gospel Music of Whitney Houston in March 2023, which upon its release became a critical and commercial success, peaking at number two on the Billboard Top Gospel Albums chart and earning a Billboard Music Award nomination.

In 2023, during promotion of the compilation, Brown, a fellow Newark native, explained watching Houston's performance at New Hope and was amazed at what he saw, saying "She started hitting notes. People were laying on the floor and caught up in the spirit. I’m still in a state of shock." Upon listening to some of Houston's early secular demos after winning permission from Cissy to work with Houston, Brown noted "they weren’t the right songs [for Houston]", saying "the stuff they put on Whitney back in the day, it was funny. They cut her wrong. They gave her the wrong material."

Brown felt Houston should use gospel music if she wanted to land a recording deal. At Brown's recording studio located at the basement of his Newark home, Brown worked on the three aforementioned songs with gospel songwriter Ann Lendy Lewis. In the studio Brown said he, Houston and Lewis created a "gospel jam session" to make sure the energy "felt right so the songs would come out perfect".

Sitting at the piano and playing chords, he uttered the words "I’m going to let my God use me," which caught Houston's attention.

"Nippy said, 'He can use me,'" Brown recalled. "She’s the type of person you could sit with her and start writing and tell her words, and Nippy could grab it. She’s like a sponge. She could grab the spirit and take it away from you and run with it." Brown continued, "we were having church in the basement," he continues. "And once you get caught up in the spirit, there is no stopping."

Brown said "the spirit took over" when they recorded the funk-flavored "Testimony," which he called a personal song he created to "tell the world about Whitney Houston and how good God's been to us." Brown noted the gospel demos helped Houston land her recording contract with Arista Records in early 1983.

Later in September 1981, months after she graduated from school, Houston signed with Eugene "Gene" Harvey of Tara Productions to be her manager, with Seymour Flics and Daniel Gittleman being co-managers; they had worked with Houston's cousin Dionne Warwick and helped her land her contract with Arista and revived her music career, which flagged throughout most of the 1970s. Warwick had personally recommended the Tara team to Houston.

== Modeling career ==
Following a performance with Cissy during a UNCF benefit concert at Carnegie Hall in 1980, Dean Avedon, a photographer for Vogue spotted Houston and her mother walking towards a Manhattan recording studio along Seventh Avenue when he approached her and asked if she ever modeled. When Houston told him she hadn't, he gave her a Click Model Management card and that same day Houston met up with the agency's president Frances Grill, who immediately put Houston to work as a model for the agency that following week. Keeping a close eye on photographers, Cissy insisted on Houston being a junior model to avoid wearing heavier makeup and revealing clothing.

Within a year, Houston signed with the more established Wilhelmina Models agency. In November 1981, the 18-year-old landed the cover of Seventeen, becoming the first black model since Joyce Walker in the early 1970s to do so. Houston's girl next door charm helped her to land in fashion spreads for Vogue, Essence, Harper's Bazaar, Glamour, Cosmopolitan and Young Miss, which was a rarity for African American models at the time. Houston would continue to model throughout the early 1980s. In February 1982, Houston was photographed in her first solo photo session by Jack Mitchell.

At one point, Houston joined fellow young models Christie Brinkley and Elle MacPherson for a photo shoot in late 1982 and were joined by Billy Joel, who was so inspired by the beauty of the trio that he wrote the song "Uptown Girls", which later became "Uptown Girl" as his relationship with Brinkley was heating up. Houston notably refused modeling engagements in South Africa as the country was under apartheid at the time.

Around 1983–84, Houston was shown in many photo ads for the Scope mouthwash brand; the ads were so popular that Houston was nicknamed "the Scope girl". Around that same time, she was featured as a singing waitress in the commercial for the soft drink Canada Dry.

Despite her modeling success, Houston soon became overwhelmed by the sessions. Said her mother Cissy in 2013: "She had as much modeling work as she wanted to do, though she did confess that she found all that standing around kind of boring. When she got to a point where it was too much for her, she'd just say 'Mommy, I got to stop now. I got to catch up on my schoolwork.'" Houston maintained a contract with Wilhelmina until 1986.

== Work with Material and Paul Jabara and Arista contract ==
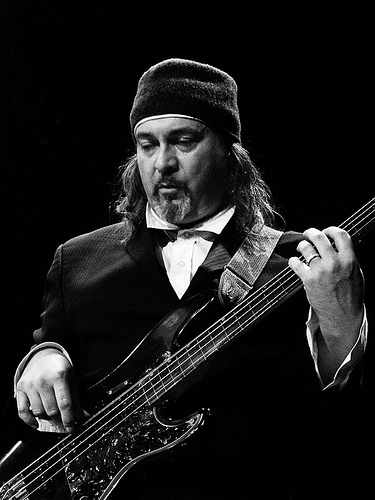
Bill Laswell produced Houston's first full lead vocal in a professional recording in 1982.

By 1982, Houston had reportedly been offered at least two more opportunities at recording contracts following Michael Zager's failed attempt, including with Quincy Jones's Qwest Records and Luther Vandross's recommendation to sign Houston to his label Epic Records so he could produce her but like with Zager before, Cissy Houston denied both opportunities, much to her daughter's dismay and disappointment.

According to her friend and New Hope Baptist Church minister Rev. DeForest Soaries in a 2012 interview with People magazine, he was called in by Houston's parents when the "ambitious" teenager began to rebel.

Said Rev. Soaries: "Whitney and I sat down at a McDonald's. The disco movement was hot, and she felt her parents were slowing down her emergence as an artist. I said, 'I know it's frustrating, and it may take you a while to get there. But no one will be able to ignore you, and no one will be able to forget you.' She just couldn't wait, but she was respectful." Not too long after that discussion with Rev. Soaries, Houston began her career as a model.

In 1980, Arista Records A&R Gerry Griffith and the label's head of promotions, Richard Smith, went to the Manhattan nightclub Bottom Line to view flutist Dave Valentin, only to catch Houston in the middle of her solo performance while her mother Cissy conducted the band. Though Smith wanted to sign her after that night, Griffith felt Houston "was special" but needed more polishing.

In 1982, Houston auditioned for Elektra Records and CBS Records.

Following the audition with the former, Houston was offered a chance to record her first full lead vocal on her rendition of "Memories", produced by rock guitarist Bill Laswell and featuring jazz saxophonist Archie Shepp. Initially Laswell had sought after saxophonist Sonny Rollins and singer Fontella Bass for the song but settled on Houston and Shepp, the latter of which was performing at a Manhattan nightclub while Houston was recommended by then Elektra president Bruce Lundvall. Houston recorded the song in just two takes. The song was included on Laswell's art rock band, Material's album One Down. The performance led to some of Houston's first critical notices, a notable review coming from Robert Christgau of The Village Voice, calling it "one of the most gorgeous ballads you've ever heard".

Later in 1982, Grammy Award-winning producer Paul Jabara, famed for his work with Donna Summer, Barbra Streisand and Diana Ross, had the eighteen-year-old record his quiet storm torch ballad "Eternal Love", a song he composed with longtime collaborator Jay Asher and originally intended for Summer to record.

The ballad was included in Jabara's album, Paul Jabara & Friends, which also featured the Weather Girls' landmark hit "It's Raining Men". Houston's name was profiled in the front of the album, which was released in February 1983. In its Top Album Picks page, Billboard highlighted Houston as an "emerging talent" that "display[ed] drama and emotion" in the song. Jabara took Houston and the Weather Girls to Studio 54 for a showcase not long after the album's release and predicted Houston would go far in her music career. Later in 1983, soul singer Stephanie Mills recorded her own rendition of the song on her album, Merciless, becoming the first Houston song to be covered by another artist.

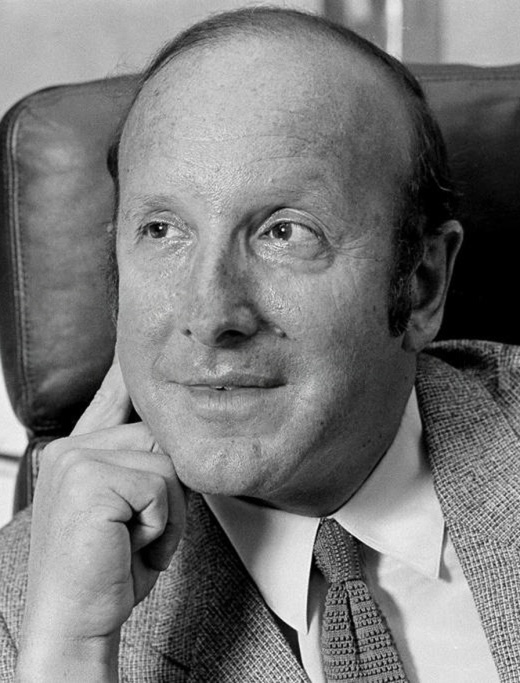
Clive Davis was encouraged to sign Houston to Arista Records after she performed "The Greatest Love of All" at a nightclub.

Around this time, Gerry Griffith re-entered the picture as he heard from someone within the New York music scene that Houston and her management were about to secure a deal with Elektra. Griffith caught Houston at the Seventh Avenue South nightclub on August 10, 1982, a day after Houston turned nineteen, and saw that Houston had improved on her 1980 performance. Said Griffith about Houston to Billboard in 2012, "It takes more than just talent, and that’s what Whitney had at such a young age. Besides the voice, with its range, tone and emotion, she displayed a fearless confidence and stage presence." Following the performance, Griffith was now anxious for Arista head Clive Davis to see Houston perform and offer her a contract, asking for a budget the very next day. According to Griffith, Davis surprisingly agreed to view a performance of the aspiring performer at the Sweetwaters club.

According to Griffith, however, after viewing her performance, Davis told him he wasn't sure if he should sign her only for Griffith and some of Davis' intimates reportedly telling the impresario he should rethink his position about Houston and he agreed to see her a second time at the same venue, Sweetwaters.

Reportedly, Davis was convinced to sign her after she performed her rendition of "The Greatest Love of All" at the club, which was dramatized for the film, Whitney Houston: I Wanna Dance with Somebody (2022) in which Houston, played by Naomi Ackie, performed the song in front of Davis, played in the film by Stanley Tucci. Days later, on August 15, 1982, according to a E! True Hollywood Story documentary focusing on Houston, the artist performed for executives at Arista at the label's main Manhattan headquarters. According to Barry Walters of Out magazine, Houston was offered the contract by Davis months later in early 1983, awaiting her signature. According to Griffith, Davis originally set up a three-song contract that was finalized into a two-album deal.

According to Houston years later, she was eventually convinced by her mother Cissy Houston to sign with Arista due to Clive Davis's successful roster of artists he mentored and produced. Houston signed with Arista on April 10, 1983, at the age of 19. The contract included a one man clause, meaning in the event Davis was to leave Arista, Houston would go with him instead of staying with the company.

In 1993, Houston explained to Anthony DeCurtis during her Rolling Stone interview how she ended up choosing Arista:

I sat down with my managers and my parents, and I remember this long, drawn-out meeting. "What are you gonna do? Who are you going to go with?" I remember stopping the meeting and saying, "I gotta take a break." I went into another room and sat in a chair, and my mother came in after me and said, "You know, this is very difficult, but I'm going to tell you the truth: You should go where you are going to get the best out of it." Meaning, let's say a company offers you a contract, and they're saying: "Whitney, you can choose the songs. You can produce the songs. You can do whatever the hell you want to do." As opposed to Arista, with Clive Davis saying: "We'll give you this amount of money, and we’ll sit down, and as far as the songs you want to do, I will help you. I will say: 'Whitney, this song has potential. This song doesn't.' So my mother was saying to me, "You're eighteen years old. You need guidance." Clive was the person who guided me.

Two weeks later, on April 29, Houston, her mother and Davis went to Los Angeles to tape a performance on The Merv Griffin Show. Prior to Houston's appearance, Davis raved about the 19-year-old, telling Griffin, "There was Lena Horne, there is Dionne Warwick, but if the mantle is to be passed to somebody who’s elegant, who’s sensuous, who’s innocent, and who has an incredible range of talent, it will be Whitney Houston," later adding Houston had "natural charm", concluding "you either got it or you don't have it. She's got it." Airing on June 23, it marked Houston's national television debut. Her performance of "Home" from the Broadway musical The Wiz, was well received by the audience and viewers later wrote to Griffin, raving about her performance. In 2012, following Houston's death, Davis recalled the performance to the Hollywood Reporter, saying, "The first time we put Whitney on television ... she was a really skinny girl with a beautiful afro ... She was very nervous, but very sweet. You could tell she was gonna be a star."

== Duets with Teddy Pendergrass and Jermaine Jackson ==
Houston recorded duets with Teddy Pendergrass and Jermaine Jackson prior to the release of her debut album.

Work on Houston's debut was initially slow due to Davis struggling to court potential producers at various showcases in New York and Los Angeles. By June, following the airing of her television debut however, things changed. Producers such as Michael Masser, Kashif, Jermaine Jackson and Narada Michael Walden would eventually be the main producers for Houston's debut. It would be with Masser that Houston would find early success with after he recruited her to be the featured duet partner of American R&B singer Teddy Pendergrass on the song "Hold Me".

Pendergrass, who nearly died from a car crash in March 1982, had become a tetraplegic and his career was in jeopardy following the crash. The singer was signed to Asylum Records in 1983 after his contract with Philadelphia International Records expired, following months of therapy sessions and vocal training and Masser offered to produce the soul crooner but had to travel to Pendergrass's Philadelphia hometown and recorded the singer at his homemade recording studio at his mansion. Houston recorded her vocals for "Hold Me" at Masser's Los Angeles studio while both of their vocals were mixed in the same city.

Released in May 1984, the song became Houston's first successful single, reaching the top ten of both the Billboard Black Singles and Adult Contemporary singles charts and the top 50 of the Billboard Hot 100. The album that featured the song, Pendergrass's Love Language, was certified gold in the United States, mainly attributed to the success of "Hold Me". Due to a submission of the ballad for a nomination at the 27th Annual Grammy Awards in 1985, Houston was infamously denied a Grammy nomination for Best New Artist in 1986, despite Clive Davis' protests. "Hold Me" was also included on Houston's debut.

Around the same period, Houston began working on a series of duets with American singer Jermaine Jackson, who had newly signed to Arista at the same time as Houston, having just left his label of fourteen years, Motown. The former Jackson 5 singer and Houston also began a short-lived but secretive torrid relationship, which later was said to have inspired Houston's recording of "Saving All My Love for You". Among the duets recorded, "Take Good Care of My Heart" was the first to be released, issued on Jackson's self titled album. It was covered later in the year by Canadian country singer Anne Murray that same year and would also be included on Houston's debut a year later.

Another song they worked on, "Don't Look Any Further", was later discarded by Arista and was eventually recorded by Motown artist Dennis Edwards, former lead singer of the Temptations as a duet with Siedah Garrett.

In January 1984, Houston gave her first public interview with Entertainment Tonight in the middle of a recording session with Jackson. By June, Jackson's album, which featured the hits "Dynamite" and "Do What You Do", had went gold and Jackson performed at the New York nightclub The Limelight where Houston joined him alongside Clive Davis. Houston was allowed to perform at the event.

In July 1984, the two performed "Take Good Care of My Heart" and another duet, "Nobody Loves Me Like You Do", on the soap opera, As the World Turns in their two-part episode, "Cinderella's Closet", which featured future Academy Award-winning actress Marisa Tomei as the homecoming queen. "Nobody Loves Me Like You Do" would also make Houston's album.

Another duet, the dance rocker "Shock Me", made the soundtrack of the John Travolta and Jamie Lee Curtis 1985 film, Perfect and was featured in the infamous scene of Curtis and Travolta seductively dancing to the song during an aerobics workout. Another duet worked on around the same time, "If You Say My Eyes Are Beautiful", was left off Houston's debut but was eventually included in Jackson's sophomore Arista release, Precious Moments, released in early 1986; Houston later included the ballad on her first official compilation album, Whitney: The Greatest Hits. Jackson also produced the funk song "Someone for Me", which was included on Houston's debut.

Houston befriended producer Kashif as the two began collaborating, first on the song "You Give Good Love", initially written with Roberta Flack in mind, and then on the funkier "Thinking About You". Kashif heavily featured Houston on his album, Send Me Your Love, however, according to her lifelong friend and then personal assistant Robyn Crawford, Houston soon demanded he take her vocals off the album after the producer failed to compensate her for her work on the album. Houston was still frequently featured on the album, most notably on the song "Are You the Woman", which Houston later received a duet credit. The song charted on Billboard's Black Singles chart in 1984.

During this period, Houston continued to model and started getting brief acting work. Early into the album's recording, Houston auditioned for the role of Denise Huxtable on comedian Bill Cosby's upcoming family sitcom, The Cosby Show and nearly won the role but eventually pulled out of it due to her emerging music career. (Note: According to the show's television producer, Jay Sandrich, Houston actually auditioned for the role of Sondra Huxtable, the Huxtables' eldest child.) According to actor Darryl M. Bell, Houston turned down the role because "it was a five-year contract". When producers tried to convince Houston to take the role, Bell said Houston then told them she was "gonna be a singer"; when the producers asked if she had a record deal, she told them she didn't. When further asked why did she think she could sing, Houston remarked, "Because my mother thinks so." Lisa Bonet eventually ended up with the role.

Houston accepted a brief cameo role in another sitcom, Gimme a Break!, as the character of Rita, a friend of Katie Kanisky, who was played in the show by Kari Michaelsen, in the episode "Katie's College", which aired on March 15, 1984. Houston also recorded commercial jingles, including a rendition of the Pointer Sisters' "Jump (For My Love)" with mother Cissy singing lead for a commercial of Bounce and a full lead in two jingles for the restaurant Steak and Ale, that aired throughout its 1985 commercials.

== Early success and acclaim ==
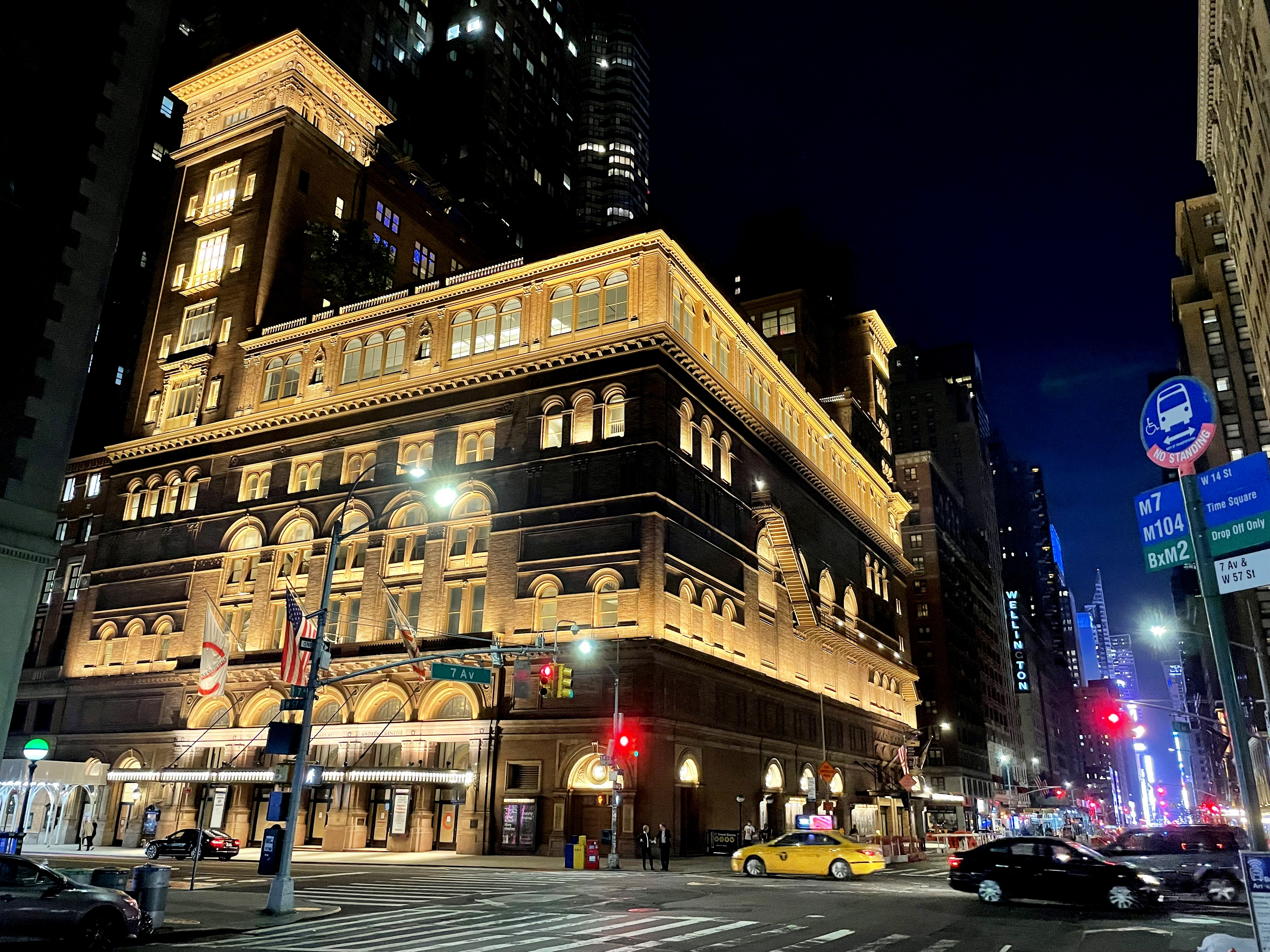
Houston headlined Carnegie Hall in the same week her hit single, "Saving All My Love for You", topped the Billboard Hot 100 in October 1985

After a year in various recording studios, Houston released her self titled debut album, Whitney Houston, on Valentines Day, February 14, 1985. During that month, Houston promoted the album at the Sweetwaters club in Manhattan. The album initially didn't become an immediate hit upon its release, entering the Billboard 200 at number 166 on March 30 of the year. Over a week after its release, "You Give Good Love" was released as the album's official lead single. The music video for the song, shot at a Manhattan club by director Michael Lindsay-Hogg was rejected by MTV brass for being "too R&B" for their playlist.

In early April, Houston performed the song on The Tonight Show Starring Johnny Carson, which at the time was seen as a breakthrough as very few emerging African American talent was ever featured on late night talk shows. The performance helped in the rising popularity of both the single and the album. On May 25, the song became Houston's first number one single on the Hot Black Singles chart.

Around that same time, the song was also starting to rise on the crossover markets of pop and adult contemporary music, much to the surprise of Clive Davis and Arista brass. On July 27, it had peaked at number three on the Billboard Hot 100 and number four on the adult contemporary charts.

Arista booked Houston on an extensive promotional tour in the United States and Europe, where in some selected countries, instead of "You Give Good Love", the ballad, "All at Once", was released as the first single. In June, Houston's debut was certified gold by the Recording Industry Association of America.

Between June and August, Houston opened for established R&B artist Jeffrey Osborne on his national US tour. The artist often stole the show from the headliner. In some selected dates, Houston also opened some shows for longtime friend, Luther Vandross. By late August, Houston began headlining her own shows after her manager at the time felt Houston's crossover pop success had made her too big to be an opening act, starting her first regional tour all over the United States called the US Tour.

In August, just as "You Give Good Love" peaked, Arista released "Saving All My Love for You" as the second official single in North America and, in many countries, the first official release from the album. The song became a hit, becoming her first to top the Billboard Hot 100 on October 26.

The song also broke Houston through internationally, topping the charts in the UK and Ireland and reaching the top ten in several countries such as Canada, Iceland, Norway, Switzerland and New Zealand while peaking inside the top 20 in Germany, the Netherlands, Austria, France and Australia. Unlike the video for "You Give Good Love", the video for "Saving All My Love for You" was accepted by MTV due to its popularity.

Two days after "Saving All My Love for You" topped the charts, Houston opened at Carnegie Hall. In November, the uptempo single "How Will I Know" was officially released as the third single from the album. By the beginning of 1986, the colorful music video for the song, shot in London, entered heavy rotation on MTV, her first video to do so. The song topped the Billboard Hot 100 in February 1986, making Houston the first female artist to have consecutive number one pop hits since Donna Summer.

A week later, she won her first Grammy Award in the Best Female Pop Vocal Performance category for "Saving All My Love for You", having accepted the award from cousin Dionne Warwick. Then, on March 8, over a year after its release, Whitney Houston, topped the Billboard 200, starting a 14-week run. Weeks later, the fourth single, "Greatest Love of All" was released. It topped the Hot 100 on May 17, making Houston the first female artist to produce three consecutive number one singles on the Billboard Hot 100.

By then, her debut album had been certified five times platinum in the United States alone and would go on to sell 14 million copies in the country, while selling a total of 25 million copies worldwide, becoming the most successful debut album in music history at the time and still is the most successful debut album by a solo artist.

In July 1986, Houston embarked on her first headlining world tour, the Greatest Love World Tour, all while also preparing for the work on her upcoming sophomore album, Whitney, which began shortly after the five-month tour's end in December. During the tour, she previewed the future hits "I Wanna Dance with Somebody (Who Loves Me)" and "Didn't We Almost Have It All". Released in June 1987, Whitney became an immediate success, debuting at number one on the Billboard 200, the first by a female artist to accomplish the feat. The leading single, "I Wanna Dance with Somebody (Who Loves Me)", topped the charts in 17 countries including the US Billboard Hot 100, cementing Houston as a global superstar from then on.

== Bibliography ==
- Ammons, Kevin; Bacon, Nancy (1998). Good Girl, Bad Girl: An Insider's Biography of Whitney Houston. Secaucus, NJ: Carol Publ. Group. ISBN 978-0-8065-8012-8.
- Bowman, Jeffrey (1994). Diva: The Totally Unauthorized Biography of Whitney Houston. HarperCollins. ISBN 978-1-52474-284-3.
- Crawford, Robyn (2019). A Song for You: My Life with Whitney Houston. Dutton. ISBN 978-1-52474-284-3.
- Houston, Cissy; Singer, Jonathan (1998). How Sweet the Sound: My Life with God and Gospel. Doubleday. ISBN 978-0-38549-010-8.
- Houston, Cissy (2013). Remembering Whitney: My Story of Love, Loss, and the Night the Music Stopped. HarperCollins. ISBN 978-0-06-223839-9.
- Parish, James Robert (2003). Whitney Houston: The Unauthorized Biography. Aurum Press. ISBN 1-85410-921-9.
