= I Am Love =

I Am Love may refer to:

- "I Am Love" (The Jackson 5 song), 1975
- I Am Love (Jennifer Holliday song), 1983
- I Am Love (album), a 1981 album by Peabo Bryson, and the title track
- I Am Love (film), a 2009 Italian film
- Aham Premasmi (lit. 'I Am Love'), a 2005 Indian Kannada-language romance film
