= Lemongello =

Lemongello is a surname. Notable people with the surname include:

- Mark Lemongello (born 1955), American baseball player
- Peter Lemongello (born 1947), American singer
