= Warning - Danger =

EP by Cissy Houston
- Released: June 29, 1979
- Recorded: 1977–1978
- Studio: Secret Sound (NYC)
- Genre: Soul; disco; funk
- Length: 31:51
- Label: Columbia
- Producer: Michael Zager

Cissy Houston chronology
Think It Over (1978)	Warning - Danger (1979)	Step Aside for a Lady (1980)

Singles from Warning - Danger
- 1. "Think It Over" Released: July 1978; 2. "Warning - Danger" Released: October 1978

Professional ratings
Review scores
Source	Rating
AllMusic	4.5/5 stars
The Virgin Encyclopedia of R&B and Soul	2/5 stars

Warning - Danger is an extended play (EP) album by American recording gospel/soul singer Cissy Houston, released on Columbia Records. It consists of four songs, three co-written and all produced by Michael Zager taken from her album, Think It Over.

The EP is extended dance mixes of "Somebody Should Have Told Me", "An Umbrella Song" and Houston's Billboard Dance chart hit single "Think It Over", which peaked at No. 5 and Billboards Hot Soul chart at No. 32, also included is the self-titled track, "Warning - Danger".

== Track listing ==
Side one
No.	Title	Writer(s)	Length
1.	"Warning - Danger"	Alvin Fields; Houston; Zager	10:24
2.	"An Umbrella Song"	Fields; Zager	5:52

Side two
No.	Title	Writer(s)	Length
1.	"Somebody Should Have Told Me"	Houston; Doug Franks; Doug James	8:04
2.	"Think It Over"	Fields; Houston; Zager	8:00

== Credits ==
- Arranged By [Backing Vocals] – Cissy Houston, Michael Zager (tracks: A1 to B2)
- Arranged By, Conductor – Michael Zager
- Backing Vocals – Alvin Fields (tracks: A1 to B2), Cissy Houston (tracks: A1 to B2), Lani Groves (tracks: A1, B1), Whitney Houston (tracks: A1, B1, B2)
- Produced, Arranged, Conducted – Michael Zager
- Art Design – Paula Scher
- Engineer – Bob Carbone, Rick Rowe
- Mastered By – Stuart Alan Love
- Mixed By – Michael Barbiero
- Photography By – Bill King
- Recorded at Secret Sound Studios, New York City.
- Mixed at Mediasound, New York
- Mastered at A&M Studios, Los Angeles.

== Charts ==
Singles

Year	Title	US R&B	US Dance
1978	"Think It Over"	32	5
