= Manny Seoane =

American baseball player (born 1955)

- Pitcher
- Born: June 26, 1955 (age 71); Tampa, Florida, U.S.
- Batted: Right Threw: Right

MLB debut
- September 18, 1977, for the Philadelphia Phillies

Last MLB appearance
- September 30, 1978, for the Chicago Cubs

MLB statistics
- Win–loss record: 1–0
- Earned run average: 5.65
- Strikeouts: 9
- Stats at Baseball Reference

Teams
- Philadelphia Phillies (1977); Chicago Cubs (1978)

Manuel Modesto Seoane (born June 26, 1955) is an American former professional baseball pitcher, whose Major League Baseball (MLB) career consisted of seven games for the Philadelphia Phillies and Chicago Cubs during the 1977 and 1978 seasons. His minor league career extended though 1981.

He attended Tampa Catholic High School in Tampa, FL and was selected in the 6th round of the 1973 June Amateur Baseball Draft by the Philadelphia Phillies.

In January 1982, Seoane surrendered himself to police authorities along with fellow former MLB pitcher Mark Lemongello, for the kidnapping and robbery of Lemongello's cousins Mike Lemongello, a former professional bowler, and Peter Lemongello, a cabaret- / pop-singer. Seoane and Mark Lemongello were both sentenced to seven years probation after they both pleaded no contest to the charges.
