= Private Stock Records =

Defunct American record label

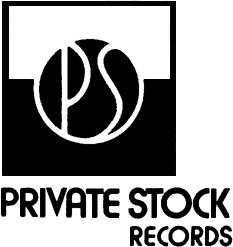
- Parent company: 43 North Broadway, LLC
- Founded: 1974
- Founder: Larry Uttal
- Defunct: 1978
- Distributors: Self-distributed (U.S., U.K.), EMI: (Italy, France, Belgium, Germany, Netherlands)
- Genre: Rock; pop; disco
- Country of origin: United States
- Location: New York, New York

Private Stock Records was a record label that operated from 1974 to 1978.

The label was founded by Larry Uttal after he left Bell Records. The label primarily focused on pop music and had numerous hit records, many of them one-hit wonders, including singles by David Soul of Starsky and Hutch fame ("Don't Give Up on Us"), Starbuck ("Moonlight Feels Right"), Austin Roberts ("Rocky"), Samantha Sang ("Emotion"), Walter Murphy and the Big Apple Band ("A Fifth of Beethoven"), Cyndi Grecco ("Making Our Dreams Come True", a.k.a. the theme song to Laverne & Shirley) and Frankie Valli ("My Eyes Adored You", "Swearin' to God", "Our Day Will Come"). The label also released Brownsville Station's album with the same name, and the singles "The Martian Boogie" and "(Lady) Put the Light on Me" in 1977. Even during 1976 and 1977 Jose Feliciano released two albums on the label, "Sweet Soul Music" (produced by Jerry Wexler) and "Angela" (soundtrack of the movie Aaron Loves Angela). More indicative of the label's nature, Private Stock issued for the US in 1976 a compilation of Rod Stewart's work with Steampacket and the Hoochie Koochie Men culled from mid-1960s live shows in the UK while the singer was transitioning from Mercury Records to Warner Brothers. In the early 1980s a Stray Cats compilation appeared in stores, ostensibly a licensee of Capitol Records but debatable as to whether it was even the same company.

Blondie's eponymous debut album—which was not a commercial success at the time—was also originally issued on Private Stock in 1976, as were two final single releases by Junior Campbell. Following the demise of Woody Woodmansey's U-Boat, singer/songwriter Phil Murray signed to the label in 1978, and released one single, End Of My Time, before moving on to Mickie Most's label RAK. Singer-songwriter Tom Paxton's 1975 album, Something in My Life and Rupert Holmes' fourth album, Pursuit of Happiness were also released by the label. Peter Lemongello released one album and a few singles for Private Stock after his debut Love '76. However, the Love '76 album was never released by Private Stock, and none of his recordings for the label charted. Gospel/soul singer Cissy Houston (mother of singer Whitney Houston) released two albums on the label- 1977's Cissy Houston and 1978's Think It Over.

The label closed down when Uttal moved to London; he later returned to New York, where he died in 1993. His son Jai Uttal owned the rights to the catalogue after his father's death, after which he sold to 43 North Broadway, LLC around 2016.

== See also ==
- List of record labels
