= Jennifer Holliday =

American singer and actress (born 1960)

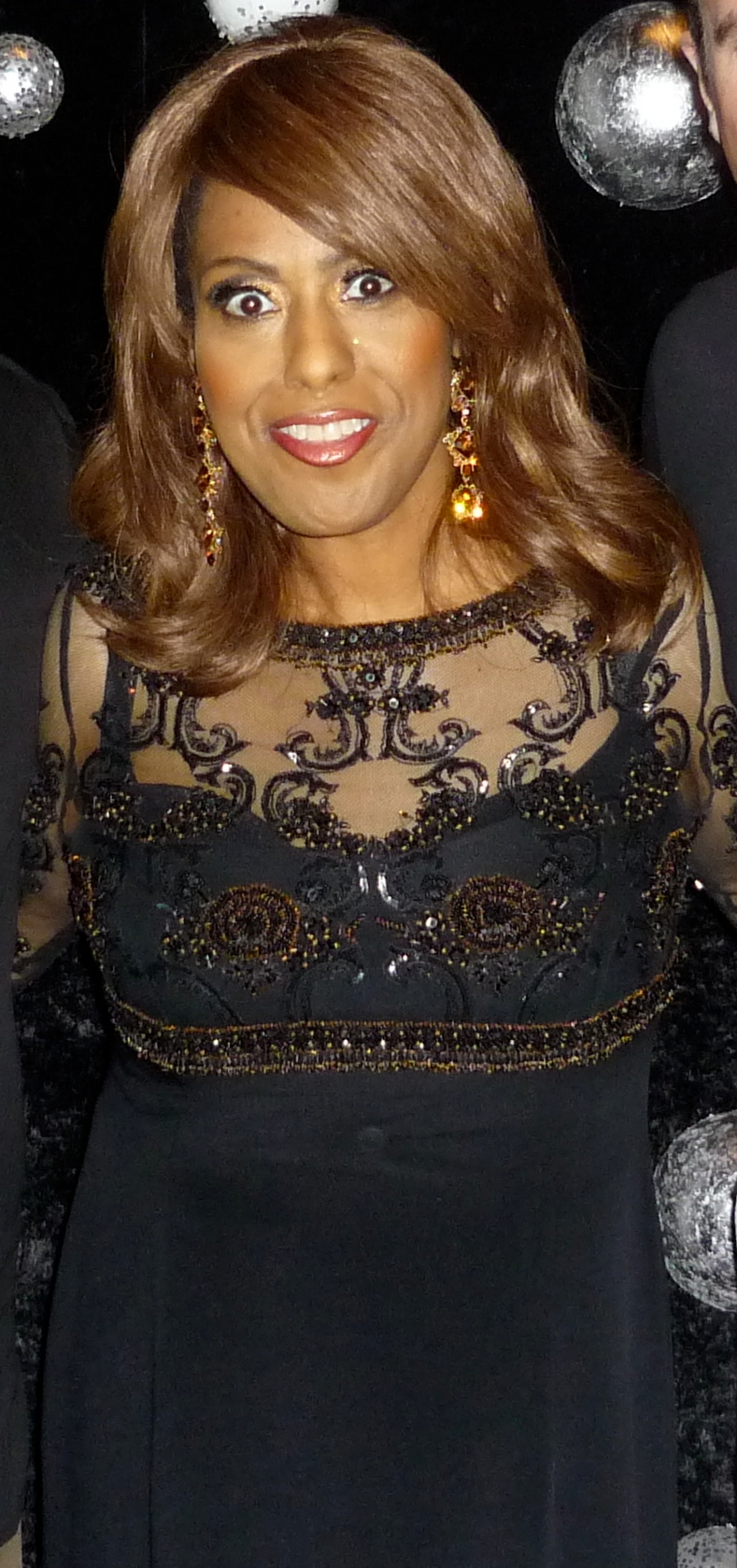
- Holliday in 2007

Background information
- Born: Jennifer Yvette Holliday; October 19, 1960 (age 66)
- Origin: Houston, Texas, U.S.
- Genres: R&B; soul; gospel; dance; jazz
- Occupations: Singer; songwriter; actress
- Instrument: Vocals
- Years active: 1979–present
- Labels: Shanachie; Arista; Intersound Records; Geffen

Jennifer Holliday (born October 19, 1960) is an American singer and actress. She has been referred to as the "Original Dreamgirl". Holliday began her career as an actress in several Broadway productions. Her signature and breakout role as Effie White in the original Broadway musical Dreamgirls (1981), led to numerous accolades including a recording contract with Geffen Records. Her debut single "And I Am Telling You I'm Not Going", released on the Dreamgirls: Original Broadway Cast Album (1981), became a number-one R&B hit and earned her a Grammy Award for Best Female R&B Vocal Performance in 1982.

She released her first album Feel My Soul on Geffen Records in 1983, to moderate success. The album's lead single, "I Am Love", peaked at number two on the US R&B chart. Her follow-up album, Say You Love Me (1985), produced a single titled "No Frills Love" which topped the US Hot Dance Club Play chart. The album also featured a rendition of "Come Sunday" which earned a Grammy Award for Best Inspirational Performance in 1986. She was subsequently dropped from Geffen after the release of third album Get Close to My Love (1987) as the label deemed her unmarketable due to her weight gain. She released her fourth album I'm on Your Side on Arista Records in 1991. After releasing her fifth album On & On (1994) on Intersound Records, she focused on her acting career.

In 1997, she landed the recurring role of Lisa Knowles in the American legal drama television series Ally McBeal for which she earned a nomination for Outstanding Supporting Actress in a Comedy Series at the NAACP Image Awards (2001). By the early 2000s, she began appearing in several Broadway and Off-Broadway musicals including Chicago, Downhearted Blues: The Life and Music of Bessie Smith, and Black Nativity. She released her sixth album The Song Is You on Shanachie Records in January 2014, her first full-length album in twenty years. In 2016, she joined the Broadway revival of The Color Purple, portraying the role of Shug Avery.

Holliday received numerous honors throughout her career. She won 2 Grammy Awards out of 4 nominations, a Tony Award, a Theatre World Award, and Drama Desk Award.

== Early life ==
Jennifer Yvette Holliday was born on October 19, 1960, in Houston, Texas, to Jennie Eaton (née Thomas), a schoolteacher, and Omie Holliday, a minister.

== Career ==
=== 1979–1982: Career beginnings and Broadway ===
While performing in her church choir, Holliday caught the attention of American dancer Jamie Patterson. At seventeen years old, she relocated to New York. In June 1980, Holliday landed her first theatre role in the Broadway production of Your Arms Too Short to Box with God. She toured with the production until October 1980. In 1980, Holliday replaced American singer Nell Carter as Effie White in theatre workshop titled Project 9, later retitled Dreamgirls. During the production of Dreamgirls, Holliday worked with the director Michael Bennett on the development of the character. In December 1981, Dreamgirls debuted to positive reviews. Her performance was widely acclaimed, particularly in her signature rendition of the musical number that ends Act I, "And I Am Telling You I'm Not Going". She earned a Tony Award for Best Leading Actress in a Musical at the 36th Tony Awards in June 1982. In the same year, Geffen Records released Dreamgirls: Original Broadway Cast Album which included a recorded version of "And I Am Telling You I'm Not Going" for which Holliday earned a Grammy Award for Best Female R&B Vocal Performance at the 25th Annual Grammy Awards in 1983. The song was released as a single in 1982, which peaked at number twenty-two on the US Billboard Hot 100 and atop of the US Hot Soul Singles chart.

=== 1983–1995: Recording career ===
In October 1983, she released her debut album Feel My Soul on Geffen Records. Feel My Soul peaked at number thirty-one on the Billboard 200 and number six on the US Black LPs chart. The album's lead single, "I Am Love", peaked at number forty-nine on the Billboard Hot 100 and number two on the US Hot Black Singles chart. The album earned a nomination for Best Female R&B Vocal Performance at the 26th Annual Grammy Awards in 1984. In early 1985, she starred as American gospel singer Mahalia Jackson in George Faison's production of Sing Mahalia, Sing!. In August 1985, she released her second album Say You Love Me, which peaked at number thirty-four on the US Top Black Albums chart. The album spawned two top-thirty R&B singles "Hard Time for Lovers" and "No Frills Love", the latter of which peaked atop of the US Hot Dance/Disco Club Play chart. The album also featured a rendition of "Come Sunday" for which she won a Grammy Award for Best Inspirational Performance in 1986.

Her third album, Get Close to My Love, was released in August 1987. Despite positive reviews from music critics, the album was commercial failure. Shortly after, she was dropped by Geffen Records after being deemed unmarketable due to her weight. In November 1987, she briefly joined the touring stage production of The Gospel Truth. In mid-1988, she starred as Aretha Franklin in the touring stage play musical Harlem Suite.

In July 1991, Holliday released her fourth studio album I'm on Your Side on Arista Records. The album's lead single and title-track, "I'm on Your Side"; a cover version of Angela Bofill, peaked at number ten on the US Hot R&B Singles chart. The album's follow-up single "Love Stories" peaked at number twenty-nine on the US Hot R&B Singles chart. Her recording career came to a halt after the release of her gospel album On & On on Intersound Records in 1994. Later that year, she reprised her role as Effie White in the Theater of the Stars production of Dreamgirls. In 1995, she joined the cast of the Broadway revival of Grease as Teen Angel.

=== 1996–2003: Resurgence ===
In 1996, Geffen Records released a greatest hit compilation album titled The Best of Jennifer Holliday, which anthologized her recordings with the record label. The album also included a remixed version of "No Frills Love" which topped the US Dance Club Play chart. In 1997, she ventured into on-screen acting and began appearing as Lisa Knowles, a recurring role in the American legal comedy-drama television series Ally McBeal. She also began making guest appearances in other television series including Touched by an Angel and Hang Time. In 1999, Holliday released a single titled "A Woman's Got the Power", which appeared on the compilation album Breaking Through, released in a collaboration between Universal Records and Lifetime. "A Woman's Got the Power" peaked at number seven on the US Dance Club Play chart. The following year, she released a cover version of Cissy Houston's "Think It Over" on Jellybean Recordings, which became her third number-one song on the Dance Club Play chart.

In January 2001, she starred as American blues singer Bessie Smith in an Off-Broadway stage production of Downhearted Blues - The Life and Music of Bessie Smith. She received her first film role as Sadie in the American drama film The Rising Place, released in February 2001. She recorded a song "You've Got to Rise Up" and served as music supervisor for the film's soundtrack. The following year, Holliday returned to doing stage productions where she again reprised her role of Effie White in the Theater of the Stars 2002 production of Dreamgirls, and later appeared in the Langston Hughes's gospel musical Black Nativity.

=== 2007–2019: Return to Broadway ===
Following the release of film Dreamgirls in 2006, Holliday announced that she felt snubbed by not being invited to appear in the film, despite original musical cast member Loretta Devine making a cameo appearance. However on June 26, 2007, Holliday made a surprise appearance at the BET Awards, performing alongside Jennifer Hudson in a duet performance of "And I Am Telling You I'm Not Going". In April 2011, Holliday released a collaborative album with Rev. Raphael G. Warnock titled Goodness and Mercy, on her own Euphonic Records label. She reunited with her original Dreamgirls cast members Sheryl Lee Ralph and Loretta Devine during the 21st Annual Divas Simply Singing! benefit concert in October 2011. In July 2012, she reprised her role of Effie White at the St. Louis Muny production of Dreamgirls. In 2014, she released her sixth album The Song Is You.

In October 2016, Holliday returned to Broadway in the revival of The Color Purple, portraying the role Shug Avery until January 2017. In May 2019, she released a single titled "Baby, Tonite".

=== 2020–present: Recent activities ===
In February 2022, she released another single titled "So in Love". Later that year, Holliday competed in season seven of The Masked Singer as "Miss Teddy" of Team Cuddly. She was unmasked on April 13 alongside Duane Chapman as "Armadillo" of Team Good. In February 2025, she released a live album titled Love Songs: Live at the Catalina Jazz Club.

== Personal life ==
Holliday was married twice. Her first husband was a musician named Billy Meadows, whom she married in 1991 after two months of dating. The marriage was short-lived and after nine months, they divorced. Holliday remarked, "The marriage ran out of steam. We just didn't know each other well enough." She married evangelist Andre Woods, on March 21, 1993, at his church in Detroit. After a marriage that was plagued by infidelity and marred by financial abuse from Woods, Holliday divorced him in 1994.

Holliday attended Texas Southern University. She later received a honoris causa Doctor of Music from Berklee College of Music in Boston in 2000.

=== Health ===
Holliday had weight issues for many years. During her original three-year tenure in the 1980s Broadway musical Dreamgirls, Holliday stated that she had reached her peak-weight of 340 pounds in 1982. Holliday stated that her weight gain stemmed from depression. Contributing factors also included a lack of career opportunities due to her obesity and the loss of her record deal with Geffen Records. The depression ultimately led to a failed attempt at suicide by consuming an overdose of sleeping pills on her thirtieth birthday. In 1989, she underwent gastric bypass surgery and reportedly lost 80 pounds after three months. By August 1991, she reportedly followed a medically supervised diet and lost a total of 124 pounds. She eventually partnered with the Magic Johnson Foundation, National Medical Association, and Pfizer to promote awareness of depression in the Black community. During her The Rosie O'Donnell Show appearance on July 12, 1996, she stated that she had a lost a total of 200 pounds.

In 1999, she was diagnosed with multiple sclerosis. She suffered paralysis and also from blindness in one eye for nearly seven months.

== Discography ==
Albums

- Feel My Soul (1983)
- Say You Love Me (1985)
- Get Close to My Love (1987)
- I'm on Your Side (1991)
- On & On (1994)
- The Song Is You (2014)

== Theatre and musical ==
Year(s)	Production	Role	Notes	Source
1980	Your Arms Too Short to Box with God	—N/a	Supporting role; Broadway	
1981–1983	Dreamgirls	Effie Melody White	Main role; Broadway	
1985	Sing Mahalia, Sing!	Mahalia Jackson	Main role; George Faison production	
1987	The Gospel Truth	Minister's wife	Supporting role; Ashton Springer production	
1988	Harlem Suite	Aretha Franklin	Main role; Off-Broadway	
1995	Grease	Teen Angel	Supporting role; Broadway	
2001	Chicago	Matron Mama Morton	Supporting role; Broadway	
2001	Downhearted Blues: The Life and Music of Bessie Smith	Bessie Smith	Main role; Off-Broadway	
2002	Black Nativity	Angel of God	Supporting role; Langston Hughes production	
2003	Like Jazz	—N/a	Mark Taper Forum	
2014	The Color Purple	Sofia	Supporting role	
2016–2017	The Color Purple	Shug Avery	Main role; Broadway	
2022	Chicago	Matron Mama Morton	Supporting role; Broadway	

== Filmography ==
=== Film ===
Year	Title	Role	Source
2001	The Rising Place	Sadie	
2009	Musical Theatre of Hope	Singer	
2010	Change in the Wind	Hattie McDaniel	
2022	The Road to Galena	Florrie	
2025	Flower of the Dawn	Ava	

=== Television ===
Year	Title	Role	Notes
1986	The Love Boat	Dr. Charlene Thomas	Episode: "The Shipshape Cruise"
1996	Ellen	Herself (uncredited)	Episode: "Fleas Navidad"
1997	Happily Ever After: Fairy Tales for Every Child	The Dream Diva (voice)	Episode: "King Midas and the Golden Touch"
1997–2001	Ally McBeal	Lisa Knowles	Recurring role; 6 episodes
1999	Touched by an Angel	Norma	Episode: "Then Sings My Soul"
2000	Hang Time	Charlotte Hayes	Episode: "The Gospel According to Silk"
2011	Happily Divorced	Herself	Episode: "Vegas Baby"
2022	The Masked Singer	Herself/"Miss Teddy"	Three episodes

== Awards and nominations ==
Year	Award	Category	Nominated work	Result	Ref.
1988	CableACE Awards	Performance in a Music Special	Cinemax Sessions (Episode: "A Gospel Session: Everybody Say Yeah!")	Won	
1981	Drama Desk Awards	Outstanding Featured Actress in a Musical	Your Arms Too Short to Box with God	Nominated	
1982	Drama Desk Awards	Outstanding Actress in a Musical	Dreamgirls	Won	
1982	Grammy Awards	Best New Artist	—N/a	Nominated	
1982	Grammy Awards	Best R&B Vocal Performance, Female	"And I Am Telling You I'm Not Going"	Won	
1983	Grammy Awards	Best R&B Vocal Performance, Female	Feel My Soul	Nominated	
1985	Grammy Awards	Best Inspirational Performance	"Come Sunday"	Won	
2001	NAACP Image Awards	Outstanding Supporting Actress in a Comedy Series	Ally McBeal	Nominated	
1982	Theatre World Awards	—N/a	Dreamgirls	Won	
1982	Tony Awards	Best Leading Actress in a Musical	Dreamgirls	Won	

== See also ==
- List of number-one dance hits (United States)
- List of artists who reached number one on the US Dance chart
