= I'm on Your Side =

Studio album by Jennifer Holliday
- Released: July 23, 1991
- Genre: Soul
- Label: Arista
- Producer: Jennifer Holliday, Barry Eastmond, Nickolas Ashford, Valerie Simpson, Michael Hutchinson, Michael J. Powell, Elliot Wolff, Oliver Leiber, Ric Wake

Jennifer Holliday chronology
Get Close to My Love (1987)	I'm on Your Side (1991)	On & On (1994)

I'm on Your Side is the fourth album by Jennifer Holliday, released in 1991. The song "I'm On Your Side", a cover version of an Angela Bofill hit, was released as a single, peaking at number 10 on the Hot R&B/Hip-Hop Singles & Tracks. The second single, "Love Stories" peaked at number 29 on the Hot R&B/Hip-Hop Singles & Tracks. Clive Davis was the executive producer.

== Critical reception ==
Professional ratings
Review scores
Source	Rating
AllMusic	4.5/5 stars

Bill Carpenter of AllMusic described the album as a "strong set of dramatic soul ballads."

Ken Parish Perkins of the Dallas Morning News declared, "With I'm On Your Side, Ms. Holliday may have found the right chemistry. Two years in the making, the album is filled with terrific songs, most of which are jazzy ballads."

== Track listing ==
1. "I'm on Your Side" (Angela Bofill, Jeffrey Cohen, Narada Michael Walden)
2. "It's in There" (Nicholas Ashford, Valerie Simpson)
3. "Raise the Roof" (Bernard Jackson, Brian Morgan, Shelly Morgan)
4. "A Dream with Your Name on It" (Bonnie Karlyle, Tom Lerner)
5. "Guilty" (Barry Eastmond, Jolyon Skinner)
6. "It Will Haunt Me" (Deborah Ash, Michael Campagne)
7. "Love Stories" (Gary Taylor)
8. "Is It Love" (Elliot Wolff, Oliver Leiber)
9. "I Fall Apart" (Diane Warren)
10. "More 'N' More" (Barry Eastmond, Jolyon Skinner)

== Charts ==
Chart (1991)	Peak position
US Billboard 200	184
US Top R&B/Hip-Hop Albums (Billboard)	29
