= Feel My Soul =

Studio album by Jennifer Holliday
- Released: October 2, 1983
- Recorded: 1983
- Studios: The Complex; Westlake, Los Angeles; Ocean Way, Hollywood; Evergreen
- Genres: Pop, R&B
- Length: 40:50
- Label: Geffen
- Producer: Maurice White

Jennifer Holliday chronology
Feel My Soul (1983)	Say You Love Me (1985)

Professional ratings
Review scores
Source	Rating
AllMusic	3/5 stars
People	(favourable)
The New York Times	(favourable)
The Baltimore Sun	3.5/5 stars
Philadelphia Inquirer	3/5 stars

Feel My Soul is the debut album by singer Jennifer Holliday, released in October 1983 on Geffen Records. The album reached No. 6 on the Billboard Top Soul Albums chart and No. 31 on the Top Albums chart. Feel My Soul was Grammy nominated within the category of Best R&B Vocal Performance, Female.

== Overview ==
Feel My Soul was produced by Maurice White, founder and leader of the funk band Earth, Wind and Fire.

== Critical reception ==
Johnny Loftus of Allmusic gave 3 out of 5 stars exclaiming " Producer Maurice White doesn't take too many risks with Feel My Soul -- he wisely keeps the focus on his star's voice." Stephen Holden of the New York Times wrote "Feel My Soul is a confident, sophisticated album bursting with spirit and intelligence. While it mutes Miss Holliday's bluster somewhat, it doesn't seriously dampen her emotional fire." Phyl Garland of Stereo Review commented "Feel My Soul, Holliday's album debut, puts her to the test as a solo performer. With a showcase production by Maurice White, who also shaped Deniece Williams's auspicious first release a few years ago, it proves that Holliday's promise was no illusion." With his 3 out of 5 stars rating Jack Lloyd of the Philadelphia Inquirer stated "Brought up on gospel music, Holliday possesses a powerful voice, and many gospel influences are evident on the album, produced by Maurice White of Earth, Wind & Fire. At times, it seems here that Holliday is trying too hard to demonstrate the dynamic capabilities of her voice, but it is clear that she will be heard from for some time to come."

== Track listing ==
No.	Title	Writer(s)	Length
1.	"Just Let Me Wait"	Jon Lind, Bill Meyers	4:50
2.	"I am Ready Now"	David Lasley, Willie Wilcox	4:56
3.	"This Game of Love (I'm Never Coming Down)"	Nicholas Ashford, Valerie Simpson	4:03
4.	"I Am Love"	David Foster, Maurice White, Allee Willis	4:36
5.	"Shine a Light"	Wayne Vaughn, Wanda Vaughn, Maurice White	4:46
6.	"Just for a While"	Gino Vannelli, Ross Vannelli	5:04
7.	"My Sweet Delight"	David Foster, Tony Haynes, Maurice White	4:28
8.	"A Change is Gonna Come"	Maurice White	4:44
9.	"This Day"	Edwin Hawkins	3:23

== Personnel ==
- Jennifer Holliday - lead vocals, backing vocals
- Crystal Wilson, Jeanette Hawes, Maurice White, Wanda Vaughn (aka "The Cornbread Choir") - backing vocals
- Caleb Quaye, Carlos Rios - guitar
- Roland Bautista - guitar Solo on track 3
- Nathan East - bass
- Bill Meyers, David Foster, Edwin Hawkins, Wayne Vaughn - keyboards
- Robbie Buchanan - synthesizers, synth solo on track 1
- Greg Phillinganes - synthesizers and synth solo on track 7
- Fred White, Ricky Lawson - drums
- Paulinho Da Costa - percussion
- Maurice White and Wanda Vaughn - backing vocal arrangements
- Bill Meyers - string and horn arrangements on tracks 1–3, 7
- Jerry Hey - horn arrangements on tracks 4, 5, 8
- Jeremy Lubbock - string arrangements on tracks 4 and 9

== Charts ==
=== Weekly charts ===
Chart (1983)	Peak position
Swedish Albums (Sverigetopplistan)	24
US Billboard 200	31
US Top R&B/Hip-Hop Albums (Billboard)	6

=== Year-end charts ===
Chart (1984)	Position
US Top Soul Albums (Billboard)	48

== Singles ==
Year	Title	US Pop	US R&B	US Dan
1983	"I Am Love"	49	2	—
1983	"Just Let Me Wait/Shine A Light/My Sweet Delight"	—	—	43
1983	"Just Let Me Wait"	—	24	—
