= The Song Is You (Jennifer Holliday album) =

Studio album by Jennifer Holliday
- Released: 2014
- Genre: R&B, soul
- Length: 1:02:11
- Label: Shanachie Records
- Producer: Randall Grass, Jennifer Holliday, David Farmer, Daniel Moore, Daniel Moore II, Terrel Sass

Jennifer Holliday chronology
Goodness & Mercy (2011)	The Song Is You (2014)

Professional ratings
Review scores
Source	Rating
AllMusic	3.5/5 stars
USA Today	3/4 stars

The Song Is You is a studio album by American R&B singer Jennifer Holliday, released in 2014 on Sanachie Records. The album reached No. 27 on the Billboard Top R&B/Hip-Hop Albums chart.

== Critical reception ==
Elysa Gardner of USA Today found, "On her first secular album in more than 20 years, Holliday is in a romantic mood, letting her big, tangy voice tease and soar, then dip to sultry depths."

With a 3.5/5 stars rating, Mark Deming of AllMusic claimed "With 2014's The Song Is You, Holliday makes her long-awaited return to pop music, lending her rich voice and passionate vocal style to a romantic set of standards and R&B classics."

== Track listing ==
No.	Title	Writer(s)	Length
1.	"Prelude... Invitation to Love"		0:46
2.	"Love Dance"	Ivan Lins, Victor Martins, Gilson Peranzetta	5:24
3.	"The Look of Love"	Burt Bacharach, Hal David	5:39
4.	"At Last"	Mack Gordon, Harry Warren	4:32
5.	"Prelude... Jenny's Serenade of Love"		1:02
6.	"The Song Is You"	Oscar Hammerstein II, Jerome Kern	5:34
7.	"Love Me by Name"	Lesley Gore, Ellen Weston	6:41
8.	"Touch"	Taylor Brooks, Darin "Zone" McKinney, Narada Michael Walden	4:55
9.	"Nobody Does It Better"	Marvin Hamlisch, Carole Bayer Sager	3:58
10.	"Prelude... Two Hearts "Real-Talk" in Love"		1:02
11.	"Are You Leaving Me?"		5:12
12.	"The One You Used to Be (Memories)"	David Farmer, Jennifer Holliday, Terrell Sass	5:13
13.	"It's Not About You"	Gordon Chambers, Dave "Jam" Hall, Phyllis Hyman	4:09
14.	"Prelude... The Promise for True-Love"		0:44
15.	"Love Is on the Way"	Dewayne Julius Rogers, Sr.	7:20

== Charts ==
Chart (2014)	Peak position
US Top R&B/Hip-Hop Albums (Billboard)	27
US Independent Albums (Billboard)	46
