= On & On (Jennifer Holliday album) =

Studio album by Jennifer Holliday
- Released: November 8, 1994
- Genre: Gospel
- Length: 63:46
- Label: Intersound Records
- Producer: Jennifer Holliday, Trammell Starks, Walter Hawkins

Jennifer Holliday chronology
I'm on Your Side (1991)	On & On (1994)

Professional ratings
Review scores
Source	Rating
Allmusic	3/5 stars
USA Today	(favourable)

On & On is a Gospel album by singer Jennifer Holliday, released in 1994 on Intersound Records. This album peaked at No. 10 on the US Billboard Top Gospel Albums chart.

== Synopsis ==
On & On is the fifth album by Holliday and contains the singles "Let Jesus Love You", "To Teach Me", and "On and On (Stronger)".

== Critical reception ==
James T. Jones IV of USA Today declared "Who could be more appropriate for gospel than Holliday, whose burly, gut-wrenching contralto seems to have no limits? The freewheeling, improvisational nature of gospel lets her unleash every spine-chilling sound in her arsenal - and she has plenty." With 3 out of 5 stars Andrew Hamilton of Allmusic found "Blustery-voiced Jennifer Holliday is even more enthralling on gospel songs than she is on Broadway and urban fare..A powerful singer plus powerful songs plus spirited musicians and backing singers equals a powerful album."

== Track listing ==
No.	Title	Writer(s)	Length
1.	"Let Jesus Love You"	Edwin Hawkins	4:49
2.	"I'll Praise His Name"		4:08
3.	"To Teach Me"	Carol D. Antrom	6:07
4.	"On and On (Stronger)"	Walter Hawkins	7:49
5.	"In Spite of It All"	Twinkie Clark/Jennifer Holliday	7:35
6.	"Show Some Signs"	Rickey Grundy	4:06
7.	"Healing Hands"	Diane Warren	6:07
8.	"It Is Well With My Soul"	Philip Paul Bliss/Horatio Spafford
9.	"Hallelujah, Amen"	Percy Bady	13:16
