= Thinking It Over =

Thinking It Over may refer to:

- Thinking It Over (album), 2002 album by Liberty X
  - "Thinking It Over" (song), 2001 single by Liberty X
- "Thinking It Over", 1988 song by Survivor from the album Too Hot to Sleep
- "Thinkin' It Over", 1971 song by John Entwistle from the album Whistle Rymes
