= Peter Lemongello =

American singer (born 1947)

- Born: Peter Limengello; February 11, 1947 (age 79); Jersey City, New Jersey, U.S.
- Genres: Pop
- Occupations: Singer, entrepreneur
- Instrument: Vocals
- Years active: 1968–2017
- Labels: Private Stock Records, Epic Records, Rapp Records
- Website: www.peterlemongello.com

Peter Lemongello (born February 11, 1947) is an American singer known for his double album Love '76.

== Early life ==
Lemongello was born in Jersey City, New Jersey and moved to North Babylon, New York at the age of seven. He graduated from North Babylon High School in 1964.

Lemongello formalized his musical ambitions in high school, when he played drums for Scotty Hamer's North Babylon Stage Band. He never learned to read music. He later spent time as a barber before being drafted for the U.S. Army and was sent to Vietnam during a period of American involvement in the Vietnam War. He then received a transfer into the military's Special Services. While in Vietnam, entertainer Martha Raye encouraged him to sing upon his return home.

== Career ==
Upon his return home, he found out that his style of music—which had similarities to the kind performed by artists such as Nat King Cole, Steve Lawrence and Frank Sinatra—was out of vogue with the contemporary pop scene. Although he did make a few appearances at minor nightclubs, he spent much of his time working a series of odd jobs, one of which was as an egg salesman and as the owner of a laundromat that happened to sell his eggs. However, he retained his musical ambitions, and a manager initially suggested the name of Johnny Baron for him to use when he performed. His manager suggested the name of Lemongello, because it reminded him of Italian American customers of lemon Jell-O. He got his first big break in 1971 when he appeared on an episode of The Tonight Show Starring Johnny Carson that was guest hosted by Joey Bishop. This led him to getting a new manager, who also served as the manager of comedian Don Rickles, who hosted another episode on which Lemongello would appear as a guest. He claimed to have made 25 appearances on The Tonight Show, although only two further appearances from him were confirmed in a 1976 interview with him for The New York Times, which also noted that he made three appearances on The Mike Douglas Show and one on The Merv Griffin Show. He released his first two records (under the name Pete Lemongello) on the Rare Bird record label to no fanfare. In 1973, he signed to Epic Records. He released one single in December 1973; it was unsuccessful and he subsequently left the label.

== Love '76 ==
Frustrated by his lack of record sales, Lemongello, along with a Suffolk banker by the name of Bob Pascuzzi, hit upon the idea of creating an album to be sold exclusively on TV, a strategy that reviewers in Newsday and the New York Daily News likened to the storyline of the 1954 Judy Holliday vehicle It Should Happen to You when they reviewed him in concert. Pascuzzi bankrolled a promotional roll-out meant to generate interest from financial backers that would result in a deal for an album and concerts. Using a city-by-city marketing strategy, Lemongello and his partners began their Love '76 advertising campaign with a 13-week TV blitz in the New York market starting January 1, 1976, and ran commercials on six of the major commercial television stations in that market between 70 and 100 times a week.

The double album was produced by Teddy Randazzo and is in a style of music that Lemongello described as "mood rock". The first disc of the album combines a number of original songs, mostly penned by Randazzo, along with covers of the then-recent standard "Wildflower" and Paul Anka's 1971 song "Do I Love You (Yes in Every Way)". The second disc is a live album, recorded at the Westbury Music Fair, featuring covers of then-current pop hits, ranging from Barry White's "You're the First, the Last, My Everything" to Jim Croce's "Bad, Bad Leroy Brown". The album as a whole sold 43,000 copies within the area, allowing the campaign to enter the markets of Los Angeles and Las Vegas. One concert promoter conceded the show that comprised the second disc of the album had sold out at 2,800 tickets but wondered whether Lemongello could repeat his success in cities with fewer Italians and where he had not advertised as heavily.

Private Stock Records signed Lemongello in May 1976. He then ended his self-promotional efforts and released his second album, Do I Love You, in late 1976. To help promote the album, which, as with its subsequent singles, failed to chart, he was sent on tour with labelmate (and future Family Guy composer) Walter Murphy. An appearance given by the duo on March 5, 1977, at the Felt Forum in New York received a mixed review from Robert Ford, Jr., who wrote in a review of the concert for the April 9, 1977 issue of Billboard that "after saturating television screens with commercials that put more emphasis on his handsome face than his thin voice, Lemongello follows up with a live act that does pretty much the same thing".

== Home construction and legal trouble ==
In August 1976, prior to the release of his Private Stock album, Lemongello was sued by Triad Media Associates, a partner in the promotion of his Love '76 album, for failing to pay an estimated $95,000 he owed the firm, failing to fulfill 8,000 orders for the album, overestimating sales of the album, and arranging to have copies of it sold in a Manhattan record store for a price lower than that which was advertised on television. Lemongello was ultimately ordered by New York State Attorney General Louis J. Lefkowitz to ship the 8,000 copies.

In the fall of 1977, Lemongello was sued by nine music publishers (Razzle Dazzle Music, Rocket Music, April Music, Edward B. Marks Music, Edsel Music, Petal Music, Colgems-EMI Music, Almo Music, and Hammer and Nails Music) for failing to pay mechanical royalties for fourteen of the songs he recorded for his Love '76 album, demanding a payment of $1 per album sold and a lump sum of $5,000 for court proceedings and for each of the litigated songs.

In 1979, Lemongello filed for bankruptcy; after an investigation, FBI agents charged him with bankruptcy fraud and lying on loan applications. He spent 16 months in federal prison. Lemongello filed for bankruptcy again in 1990, claiming $1.6 million in debt and $5,900 in personal property, $2,000 of which were for his clothes.

Lemongello later worked as a housing contractor in New York and Florida. In the early 1980s he was accused of masterminding two acts of arson on two luxury houses that his construction firm was working on near St. Petersburg, Florida. Lemongello subsequently pled no contest to charges of arson and insurance fraud, in what his lawyer said was a "business decision" to avoid a trial.

On January 15, 1982, Lemongello and his brother, bowler Mike Lemongello, were kidnapped from a construction site, Mike was forced to withdraw more than $50,000 from a bank, and both were then left in the woods. Manny Seoane and Mark Lemongello (the brothers' cousin), both former Major League Baseball pitchers, turned themselves in to police and in 1983 were sentenced to seven years' probation, which Lemongello violated by failing to pay back his insurance company. Peter was also ordered to pay former Houston Astros pitcher Joe Sambito (a former teammate of his cousin Mark) $439,000 for failing to finish building a home for him and reneging on a contract.

== Later career ==
He went on to perform at many South Florida venues, in dinner theater in Branson, Missouri, and regularly in the summer in Atlantic City, on Long Island, and in upstate New York. In 2012 he had a one-man song and comedy show titled Meatballs, Matzo Balls and Lemon-Gello, and also re-recorded his 1976 song "Can't Get Enough Of You Girl" with producer and songwriter Jimmy Michaels; it appears on the re-issue of the Michaels album More Things Change.

== Parodies ==
Lemongello was spoofed in the episode of Saturday Night Live that aired May 22, 1976, with Chevy Chase playing a singer named Peter Lemon Mood Ring, who changed colors with every song. Chase used Lemongello's actual name for a character in his 1989 film Fletch Lives.

== Personal life ==
Currently, he lives in Boca Raton, Florida. He and his wife Karen have a son, Peter Jr., who in 2019 appeared on American Idol. Karen is his second wife; his first, whom he later divorced, was a drum majorette with Scotty Hamer's North Babylon Stage Band at his high school.

== Discography ==
- Love '76 (1976), Rapp Records
- Do I Love You (1976), Private Stock Records
- Love '76 Deluxe Version (2018) Digital Download
