= Get Close to My Love =

Album by Jennifer Holliday

Studio album by Jennifer Holliday
- Released: August 18, 1987
- Genre: Soul
- Label: Geffen
- Producer: Jennifer Holliday, René Moore, David Pack, Michael McDonald, Alan Glass, Preston Glass, Tommy LiPuma, Marcus Miller

Jennifer Holliday chronology
Say You Love Me (1985)	Get Close to My Love (1987)	I'm on Your Side (1991)

Get Close to My Love is the third album by soul singer and stage star Jennifer Holliday, released in 1987 on Geffen Records. The album reached No. 26 on the Swedish Pop Albums Chart.

== Overview ==
Lead single, "Heart On The Line", reached number 48 on the Billboard Hot Black Singles chart, followed by "Read It In My Eyes". The album included a cover of the Gladys Knight & the Pips' classic "Giving Up."

== Critical reception ==
Professional ratings
Review scores
Source	Rating
AllMusic	2/5 stars
Stereo Review	(favourable)

Phyl Garland of Stereo Review exclaimed "She doesn't let us down on her new album", adding "There are pleasant moments to be found in "Get Close to My Love."

== Track listing ==
1. "New At It" (Nickolas Ashford, Valerie Simpson)
2. "He Ain't Special (He's Just The One I Love)" (David Pack, Michael McDonald)
3. "Get Close to My Love" (Alan Glass, Cliff Dawson, Preston Glass)
4. "Read It in My Eyes" (Dean Pitchford, Tom Snow)
5. "Ain't It Just Like Love" (Clif Magness, Mark Mueller)
6. "Heart on the Line" (Alan Glass, Preston Glass)
7. "I Never Thought I'd Fall in Love Again" (Pat Hunt, Ron Cohen)
8. "Givin' Up" (Clyde Wilson, Herbert Ross)
