= No Frills Love =

Single by Jennifer Holliday

from the album Say You Love Me
- Released: 1985
- Genre: Disco
- Songwriters: (Arthur Baker, Gary Henry, Tina B)

"No Frills Love" is a 1985 dance single by Broadway star and Tony Award winner, Jennifer Holliday. The single was first a hit when it became Holliday's fourth Hot 100 entry. "No Frills Love" peaked at number eighty-seven on the pop chart and number twenty-nine on the soul singles chart. Early in 1986, the single reached number one on the dance chart, remaining there for one week. A decade later a new mix of "No Frills Love" hit the top spot on the dance chart, again for a single week.
