= Cissy Houston (album) =

Studio album by Cissy Houston
- Released: May 12, 1977
- Recorded: 1976–1977
- Studio: Columbia, New York City
- Genre: R&B; soul
- Length: 34:57
- Label: Private Stock
- Producer: Michael Zager

Cissy Houston chronology
Presenting Cissy Houston (1970)	Cissy Houston (1977)	Think It Over (1978)

Singles from Cissy Houston
- 1. "Love Is Something That Leads You" Released: February 1977; 2. "Love Is Holding On" Released: June 1977; 3. "He Ain't Heavy, He's My Brother" Released: 1978

Cissy Houston is the second studio album by American soul/gospel singer Cissy Houston, released in 1977 on Private Stock Records as the follow-up to her debut album, Presenting Cissy Houston. The original recording was re-mastered and includes extensive liner notes and re-released on CD under Cherry Red Records in 2013.

The album was produced and arranged by Michael Zager and features pop/soul cover versions of Elton John's "Your Song", "Make It Easy on Yourself", written by Burt Bacharach and Hal David, as well as covers of "He Ain't Heavy, He's My Brother" and "Tomorrow" from the musical Annie.

== Track listing ==
U.S., UK Vinyl, LP Album

Side One
No.	Title	Writer(s)	Length
1.	"Tomorrow"	Charles Strouse; Martin Charin	3:33
2.	"Morning Much Better"	Aram Schefrin; Michael Zager	4:06
3.	"Your Song"	Elton John; Bernie Taupin	5:43
4.	"Love Is Holding On"	Barbara Morr; Betsy Derkin Matthes	3:28

Side Two
No.	Title	Writer(s)	Length
5.	"He Ain't Heavy, He's My Brother"	Bob Russell; Bobby Scott	4:21
6.	"It Never Really Ended"	Alvin Fields; Barbara Soehner	2:55
7.	"Make It Easy on Yourself"	Burt Bacharach; Hal David	5:14
8.	"Things to Do"	George Young; Harry Vanda	3:20
9.	"Love Is Something That Leads You"	Soehner; Zager	2:59

== Personnel ==
- Backing Vocals – Cissy Houston, Alvin Fields, Arnold McCuller, David Lasley, Ken Williams, Maeretha Stewart, Ullanda McCullough
- Bass guitar – Bob Babbitt, Will Lee
- Drums – Rick Marotta, Steve Jordan
- English Horn – George Marge
- Executive producer – Jerry Love
- French Horn – Brooks Tillotson, Jim Buffington, Sharon Moe
- Guitar – Cornell Dupree, Jeff Mironov, Lance Quinn
- Keyboards – Donny Harper, Leon Pendarvis, Richard Tee, Rob Mounsey
- Mixed By – Bob Walker, Lee Yates, Phil Gianbalvo
- Alto Saxophone, Tenor Saxophone, Alto Flute, Oboe, English Horn – George Marge (tracks: B1)
- Percussion – Rubens Bassini
- Alto Saxophone, Tenor Saxophone, Alto Flute – Arnie Lawrence (tracks: B3)
- Strings – Alfred Vincent Brown Strings
- Trombone – David Taylor, Gerald Chamberlain
- Trumpet, Flugelhorn – John Gatchell, Robert Millikan
- Engineer – Tim Geelan
- Photography, Design – Ed Caraeff
