= Say You Love Me (album) =

Studio album by Jennifer Holliday
- Released: August 19, 1985
- Label: Geffen
- Producer: Michael Jackson, George Tobin, Arthur Baker, Richard Scher, Lotti Golden, Bobby Coleman, Tommy LiPuma, Andy Goldmark, Bruce Roberts

Jennifer Holliday chronology
Feel My Soul (1983)	Say You Love Me (1985)	Get Close to My Love (1987)

Say You Love Me is the second studio album by American singer Jennifer Holliday released on vinyl and cassette. It was released by Geffen Records. In 1985, two singles were released from the album. The singles were "Hard Time for Lovers" and "No Frills Love". Michael Jackson co-wrote and produced the album's opener "You're The One." The album charted at #110 on the Billboard 200 and #34 at the Top R&B/Hip-Hop Albums.

== Critical reception ==
AllMusic gave a 3 out of 5 star rating. Liam Lacey of The Globe and Mail wrote "Holliday comes through with one of your basic paint-blistering displays of vocal derring-do that easily fulfils the exceptional promise of her Dreamgirls soundtrack."

== Track listing ==
1. "You're The One" (Michael Jackson, Alan "Buz" Kohan)
2. "What Kind of Love Is This" (John Duarte, Mark Paul)
3. "No Frills Love" (Arthur Baker, Gary Henry, Tina B)
4. "Hard Times for Lovers" (Lotti Golden, Richard Scher, Bobby Coleman)
5. "Say You Love Me" (D. J. Rogers)
6. "I Rest My Case" (Carl Sturken, Evan Rogers)
7. "Dreams Never Die" (John Duarte, Mark Paul)
8. "Just a Matter of Time" (V. Jeffrey Smith)
9. "He's a Pretender" (Gary Goetzman, Mike Piccirillo)
10. "Come Sunday" (Duke Ellington)
