= I Am Love (Jennifer Holliday song) =

Single by Jennifer Holliday

from the album Feel My Soul
- B-side: "Heartstrings"
- Released: August 1983
- Genre: R&B, soul
- Length: 4:34
- Label: Geffen
- Songwriter(s): Maurice White, David Foster, Allee Willis
- Producer(s): Maurice White

Jennifer Holliday singles chronology
"I Am Love" (1983)	"Just Let Me Wait" (1983)

"I Am Love" is a song by singer Jennifer Holliday, released as a single in 1983 by Geffen Records from her album Feel My Soul. The song reached No. 2 on the Billboard Hot R&B Singles chart.

== Overview ==
"I Am Love" was produced by Maurice White and written by White, David Foster and Allee Willis. The B-side of the single is a song called "Heartstrings".

== Critical reception ==
Stephen Holden of The New York Times called "I Am Love" a "big, bursting ballad..that deliberately recall(s) her Dreamgirls arias" and a "big, swelling tune and lyrics that make a grand pronouncement". Johnny Loftus of Allmusic proclaimed that "I Am Love" is the real standout. Beginning as a fluttering, austere piano ballad, the song abruptly shifts into high gear, where Holliday's high note trills and enormous chorus vocalizing recall her mind-blowing performance of "And I Am Telling You I'm Not Going" from Dreamgirls."
