= Think It Over (album) =

Studio album by Cissy Houston
- Released: June 1978
- Recorded: 1977–1978
- Studio: Secret Sound Studios, NYC
- Genre: Soul; disco; funk
- Length: 72:31
- Label: Private Stock Records
- Producer: Michael Zager

Cissy Houston chronology
Cissy Houston (1977)	Think It Over (1978)	Warning - Danger (1979)

Singles from Think It Over
- 1. "Think It Over" Released: July 1978; 2. "Warning - Danger" Released: October 1978

Think It Over is the third studio album by American gospel/soul singer Cissy Houston, released in 1978 on Private Stock Records. The album was produced by Michael Zager and features Houston's R&B hit "Think It Over", which peaked at #5 on the Billboards Dance chart and #32 on Billboards Hot Soul chart. The album was #7 on the Canadian Dance charts October 14, 1978.

In 2013, the original recording was remastered and re-released on CD with bonus tracks under Cherry Red Records. The bonus extra are remixes of "An Umbrella Song", "Warning-Danger", "Somebody Should Have Told Me" and "Think It Over", which were originally included on her 1979's album Warning-Danger, released by Columbia Records.

== Track listing ==
Side one

1. "Think It Over" (Alvin Fields, Cissy Houston, Michael Zager) – 6:00
2. "Love Don't Hurt People" (Ron Netsky, Steve Netsky) – 3:01
3. "Somebody Should Have Told Me" (Cissy Houston, Doug Frank, Doug James) – 4:30
4. "After You" (Doug Frank, Doug James) – 4:38

Side two

1. "Warning - Danger" (Alvin Fields, Cissy Houston, Michael Zager) – 5:56
2. "I Just Want To Be With You" (Alvin Fields, Michael Zager) – 5:08
3. "An Umbrella Song" (Alvin Fields, Michael Zager) – 2:58
4. "Sometimes" (Alvin Fields, Cissy Houston, Michael Zager) – 3:33
5. "I Won't Be The One" (Alvin Fields, Cissy Houston, Doug Frank) – 3:00

CD reissue bonus tracks

1. "Warning-Danger" (Extended Disco Mix) – 10:26
2. "An Umbrella Song" (Extended Disco Mix) – 5:52
3. "Somebody Should Have Told Me" (Extended Disco Mix) – 8:04
4. "Think It Over" (Extended Disco Mix) – 7:59

== Production ==
- Arranged by [Backing Vocals] – Cissy Houston, Michael Zager (tracks: A1 to B1, B3 to B5)
- Arranged By, Conductor – Michael Zager
- Backing Vocals – Alvin Fields (tracks: A1 to B2, B4, B5), Beverly Ingram (tracks: A3, A4, B2, B4, B5), Cissy Houston (tracks: A1 to B2, B4, B5)
  Donny Harper (tracks: B2, B5), Lani Groves (tracks: A1, A2, B1), Whitney Houston (tracks: A1 to B2, B4, B5)
- Baritone Saxophone – Ronnie Cuber
- Bass – Francisco Centeno
- Alto Saxophone – Lenny Hambro
- Drums – Allan Schwartzberg
- Electric Piano – Michael Zager (tracks: B2)
- Engineer [Assistant] – Darroll Gustamachio
- Engineer [Recording, Mixing] – Rick Rowe
- Executive-Producer – Jerry Love
- Guitar – Jeff Mironov
- Harmonica – Michael Chimes (tracks: B3)
- Keyboards, Synthesizer, Synthesizer [Moog] – Rob Mounsey
- Mastered by – Joey Gastwirt
- Percussion – Rubens Bassini
- Strings – Alfred Brown String Section
- Trombone – Gerald Chamberlain
- Bass trombone – Jack Jeffers
- Trumpet, Flugelhorn – Alan Rubin, Burt Collins, John Gatchell, Robert Milliken
- Vibraphone – Dave Carey
- Art direction – Abie Sussman
- Voice [Siren] – Jerry Love (tracks: B1)

== Credits ==
- Produced, Arranged, Conducted – Michael Zager
- Executive-producer – Jerry Love
- Recorded at Secret Sound Studios, New York City.
- Mastered at Masterdisc, New York City.

== Charts ==
Singles

Year	Title	US R&B	US Dance
1978	"Think It Over"	32	5
