= Think It Over (Cissy Houston song) =

Single by Cissy Houston

from the album Think It Over
- B-side: "An Umbrella Song"
- Released: June 29, 1978
- Genre: Soul, Disco
- Length: 3:21
- Label: Private Stock Records
- Songwriter(s): Cissy Houston, Michael Zager Alvin Fields
- Producer(s): Michael Zager

Cissy Houston singles chronology
"Love Is Something That Leads You" (1977)	"Think It Over" (1978)	"Warning - Danger" (1978)

"Think It Over" is a song by American recording gospel/soul singer Cissy Houston and is the lead single from her 1978 third studio album Think It Over. The disco track was written by Houston, along with Michael Zager and Alvin Fields. "Think It Over" was produced by Zager and peaked at #5 on the disco charts, as well as #32 on the Hot Soul Singles chart.

== Track listings and formats ==
- US 12" Vinyl single
  - A "Think It Over" – 6:19
  - B "An Umbrella Song" – 5:56
- UK 7" Vinyl single
  - A "Think It Over" – 3:21
  - B "An Umbrella Song" – 2:58

== Credits and personnel ==
- Lead vocals, background vocals – Cissy Houston, Whitney Houston
- Executive Producer – Jerry Love
- Producer – Michael Zager
- Written-By – Alvin Fields, Cissy Houston, Michael Zager

Track A

== Cover versions ==
- In 2000, Jennifer Holliday covered the song which went to No. 1 on the Billboard Hot Dance Club Play chart.

== Charts ==
Chart (1978)	Peak position
UK Disco Top 90 (Record Mirror)	28
Canada Disco Top 30 (RPM)	3
US Hot R&B/Hip-Hop Songs (Billboard)	32
US Dance Club Songs (Billboard)	5

== See also ==
- List of Billboard number-one dance singles of 2000
