= New York Sessions '67 =

Compilation album by Van Morrison
- Released: 1997
- Recorded: 1967; New York
- Genre: Rock
- Label: multiple reissues (Note: Payin' Dues released by Charly Records (UK) 1994 and Payin' Dues - The Complete Bang Records Sessions '67 released by Fruit Tree (Italy) 2002.) (Note: New York Sessions '67 released by Burning Airlines (UK) 1996, Recall Records (UK) 1997, Get Back (Italy) 1997, and Hallmark Records (Germany) 1999.) (Note: The Complete Bang Sessions released by Purple Pyramid (US) 2002.)
- Producer: Bert Berns

Van Morrison chronology
The Best of Van Morrison Volume Two (1993)	New York Sessions '67 (1997)	The Philosopher's Stone (1998)

Professional ratings
Review scores
Source	Rating
Allmusic	4/5 stars

New York Sessions '67 is a two-disc retrospective album of recordings made by Van Morrison in 1967 for Bang Records that were later released in the 1990s. Other album releases with the same recordings have been called Payin' Dues and The Complete Bang Sessions. The first disc presents material already available on Blowin' Your Mind! and on the previous Bang compilation albums T.B. Sheets and Bang Masters. The second disc contains the notorious "Contractual Obligation" session – thirty-one improvised nonsense songs Morrison recorded in order to fulfill his contract with Bang Records. According to Erik Hage, the song "Thirty Two" "takes a swipe at Berns's...production style and 'Brown Eyed Girl': Morrison sings 'we'll get three guitars .. and we'll do the sha, sha-la-la bit.'" Tracks from this album would be officially released on the compilation album The Authorized Bang Collection.

== Track listing ==
All songs by Van Morrison except where noted.

=== Disc one ===
1. "Brown Eyed Girl" – 3:03
2. "He Ain't Give You None" (alternate version) – 5:50
3. "T.B. Sheets" – 9:36
4. "Spanish Rose" (alternate version) – 3:52
5. "Goodbye Baby (Baby Goodbye)" (Wes Farrell, Bert Russell) – 2:57
6. "Ro Ro Rosey" – 3:03
7. "Who Drove the Red Sports Car?" – 5:39
8. "Midnight Special" (traditional) – 2:45
9. "Beside You" – 6:05
10. "It's All Right" – 4:58
11. "Madame George" – 5:17
12. "Send Your Mind" – 2:52
13. "The Smile You Smile" – 2:54
14. "The Back Room" – 5:30
15. "Joe Harper Saturday Morning" (alternate version) – 4:15
16. "Chick-A-Boom" (Bert Berns, Morrison) – 3:12
17. "I Love You (The Smile You Smile)" – 2:22
18. "Brown Eyed Girl" (alternate take) – 3:40

=== Disc two ===
1. "Twist And Shake" – 1:19
2. "Shake And Roll" – 0:58
3. "Stomp And Scream" – 1:14
4. "Scream And Holler" – 1:14
5. "Jump And Thump" – 1:08
6. "Drivin' Wheel" – 1:13
7. "Just Ball" – 1:00
8. "Shake It Mable" – 1:12
9. "Hold On George" – 1:30
10. "The Big Royalty Check" – 1:36
11. "Ring Worm" – 1:31
12. "Savoy Hollywood" – 1:00
13. "Freaky If You Got This Far" – 1:04
14. "Up Your Mind" – 1:13
15. "Thirty Two" – 0:59
16. "All The Bits" – 0:54
17. "You Say France And I Whistle" – 0:54
18. "Blow In Your Nose" – 1:25
19. "Nose In Your Blow" – 1:02
20. "La Mambo" – 0:52
21. "Go For Yourself" – 1:20
22. "Want A Danish" – 1:05
23. "Here Comes Dumb George" – 0:56
24. "Chickee Coo" – 1:10
25. "Do It" – 1:01
26. "Hang On Groovy" – 0:57
27. "Goodbye George" – 1:17
28. "Dum Dum George" – 1:27
29. "Walk And Talk" – 1:07
30. "The Wobble" – 1:03
31. "Wobble And Ball" – 1:06
