= Bang Masters =

Compilation album by Van Morrison
- Released: February 1991
- Recorded: 1967
- Studio: A&R Studios, New York; Century Sound, New York
- Genre: Rock & roll, R&B
- Length: 77:50
- Label: Epic, Legacy
- Producer: Bert Berns

Van Morrison chronology
The Best of Van Morrison (1990)	Bang Masters (1991)	The Best of Van Morrison Volume Two (1993)

Professional ratings
Review scores
Source	Rating
AllMusic	4.5/5 stars
Christgau's Consumer Guide	(3-star Honorable Mention)

Bang Masters is a compilation album by Van Morrison released in 1991 by Sony Music—owners of Bang Records' back catalog. The tracks were remixed from the original multi-tracks and were given a wider stereo spread with less compression. These remixes would later appear on a 1998 CD reissue of Blowin' Your Mind!, and subsequent compilations official and otherwise. The original stereo mixes would not see CD release until The Authorized Bang Collection in 2017.

The alternate version of "Brown Eyed Girl" included on this album was according to Bill Flannagan take six out of the twenty-two takes before the final released form.

== Track listing ==
All songs by Van Morrison except as noted.

1. "Brown Eyed Girl" – 3:03
2. "Spanish Rose" (alternate version) – 3:52
3. "Goodbye Baby (Baby Goodbye)" (Wes Farrell, Bert Russell) – 2:57
4. "Ro Ro Rosey" – 3:03
5. "Chick-A-Boom" (Bert Berns, Morrison) – 3:12
6. "It's All Right" – 4:58
7. "Send Your Mind" – 2:52
8. "The Smile You Smile" – 2:54
9. "The Back Room" – 5:30
10. "Midnight Special" (traditional) – 2:45
11. "T.B. Sheets" – 9:36
12. "He Ain't Give You None" (alternate version) – 5:50
13. "Who Drove the Red Sports Car?" – 5:39
14. "Beside You" – 6:05
15. "Joe Harper Saturday Morning" (alternate version) – 4:15
16. "Madame George" – 5:17
17. "Brown Eyed Girl" (alternate take) – 3:40
18. "I Love You (The Smile You Smile)" – 2:22
