= The Authorized Bang Collection =

Compilation album by Van Morrison
- Released: April 28, 2017
- Genre: Rock
- Label: Exile • Legacy

The Authorized Bang Collection is a compilation album by Van Morrison containing every track that Morrison recorded for Bang Records in the 1960s. It was released on April 28, 2017, by Legacy Recordings on the Bang label.

The first disc, The Original Masters, contains 17 tracks including every track from Morrison's debut album Blowin' Your Mind! in their original stereo mixes. The second disc, Bang Sessions & Rarities, contains alternate takes from the Bang sessions. The third disc, Contractual Obligation Session, contains demos Morrison recorded to fulfill his contractual obligations to Bang; he recorded them in one session on an out-of-tune guitar, with lyrics about subjects including ringworm and sandwiches. The throwaway compositions came to be known as the "revenge" songs, and remained officially unreleased until this collection was compiled.

== Track listing ==
=== Disc 1: The Original Masters ===
1. Brown Eyed Girl [original stereo mix]
2. He Ain't Give You None [original stereo mix]
3. T.B. Sheets [original stereo mix]
4. Spanish Rose [original stereo mix]
5. Goodbye Baby (Baby Goodbye) [original stereo mix]
6. Ro Ro Rosey [original stereo mix]
7. Who Drove the Red Sports Car [original stereo mix]
8. Midnight Special [original stereo mix]
9. It's All Right [original stereo mix]
10. Send Your Mind [original stereo mix]
11. The Smile You Smile [original stereo mix]
12. The Back Room [original stereo mix]
13. Joe Harper Saturday Morning [original stereo mix]
14. Beside You [original mono mix]
15. Madame George [original mono mix]
16. Chick-a-Boom [original mono mix]
17. The Smile You Smile [demo]

=== Disc 2: Bang Sessions & Rarities ===
1. Brown Eyed Girl [original edited mono single mix]
2. Ro Ro Rosey [original mono single mix with backing vocals]
3. T.B. Sheets [Take 2]*
4. Goodbye Baby (Baby Goodbye) [Takes 10 & 11]*
5. Send Your Mind [Take 3]*
6. Midnight Special [Take 7]
7. He Ain't Give You None (Take 4)
8. Ro Ro Rosey [Take 2]*
9. Who Drove the Red Sports Car (Take 6)
10. Beside You [Take 2]*
11. Joe Harper Saturday Morning [Take 2]*
12. Beside You [Take 5]*
13. Spanish Rose [Take 14] (4:23)*
14. Brown Eyed Girl [Takes 1-6]*
15. Brown Eyed Girl [Takes 7-11]*

Note

- (*)—Previously unreleased

=== Disc three: Contractual Obligation Session ===
All tracks previously unreleased.

1. Twist and Shake
2. Shake and Roll
3. Stomp and Scream
4. Scream and Holler
5. Jump and Thump
6. Drivin' Wheel
7. Just Ball
8. Shake It Mable
9. Hold on George
10. The Big Royalty Check
11. Ring Worm
12. Savoy Hollywood
13. Freaky If You Got This Far
14. Up Your Mind
15. Thirty Two
16. All the Bits
17. You Say France and I Whistle
18. Blowin' Your Nose
19. Nose in Your Blow
20. La Mambo
21. Go for Yourself
22. Want a Danish
23. Here Comes Dumb George
24. Chickee Coo
25. Do It
26. Hang on Groovy
27. Goodbye George
28. Dum Dum George
29. Walk and Talk
30. The Wobble
31. Wobble and Ball
