= T.B. Sheets (album) =

Compilation album by Van Morrison
- Released: 1973
- Recorded: 1967; A&R Studios, New York; Century Sound, New York
- Genre: Rock
- Length: 42:50
- Label: Bang Records (US), London Records (UK)
- Producer: Bert Berns

T.B. Sheets is a retrospective album of recordings made in 1967 by Northern Irish musician Van Morrison, released in 1973 on Bang Records. It contains songs that had appeared on Morrison's debut album, Blowin' Your Mind!, including his first hit, "Brown Eyed Girl". It also features early versions of two songs that appeared in 1968 on Morrison's acclaimed album Astral Weeks — "Beside You" and Astral Weeks' centerpiece, "Madame George".

This recording is listed as an unauthorized album that was released without Morrison's knowledge or approval. It has been re-issued on CD in various countries.

== Track listing ==
All songs written by Van Morrison.

=== Side one ===
1. "He Ain't Give You None" - 5:11
2. "Beside You" (original take) - 6:07
3. "It's All Right" - 5:04
4. "Madame George" (original take) - 5:13

=== Side two ===
1. "T.B. Sheets" - 9:44
2. "Who Drove the Red Sports Car?" - 5:26
3. "Ro Ro Rosey" - 3:07
4. "Brown Eyed Girl" radio edit - 3:01

== Personnel ==
- Van Morrison - vocals, guitar, harmonica on T.B. Sheets
- Eric Gale- guitar
- Hugh McCracken - guitar
- Al Gorgoni - guitar
- Donald Thomas - guitar
- Bob Bushnell - bass
- Russell Savakas - bass
- Artie Butler - keyboards, Hammond organ
- Paul Griffin - keyboards
- Artie Kaplan - flute, saxophone
- Seldon Powell - flute, saxophone
- Jeff Barry - identified as "Jeff Berry" tambourine, backing vocals
- The Sweet Inspirations - backing vocals
- Bert Berns - production, backing vocals
- Brooks Arthur - engineering, backing vocals
- Herbie Lovelle - drums
- Gary Chester - drums
- George Devins - percussion, vibraphone
