= The Sweet Inspirations (album) =

Studio album by Sweet Inspirations
- Released: November 1967
- Recorded: April 1967
- Genre: R&B, soul
- Length: 33:10
- Label: Atlantic
- Producer: Tom Dowd, Tommy Cogbill

Sweet Inspirations chronology
The Sweet Inspirations (1967)	Songs of Faith & Inspiration (1968)

Singles from The Sweet Inspirations
- 1. "Why (Am I Treated so Bad)" Released: May 1967; 2. "Let It Be Me" Released: July 1967; 3. "Sweet Inspiration" Released: February 1968

The Sweet Inspirations is the self-titled debut album by American recording soul/gospel female group the Sweet Inspirations, released in 1967 by Atlantic Records. Led by Cissy Houston, the Sweet Inspirations were highly-in-demand female back-up singers featured on some of the most important pop and soul recordings of the 1960s and '70s. They toured and served as session background vocals on albums by various artists' including Elvis Presley, Aretha Franklin, Wilson Pickett and Dusty Springfield. This was their first album, recorded in 1967, in which it contains mostly covers of the hits of the day. The album peaked at number 12 on Billboard's Hot Soul Albums, and features the Top 20 hit "Sweet Inspiration" plus the R&B chart hits "Why (Am I Treated So Bad)" and "Let It Be Me".

== Track listing ==
All tracks supervised by Jerry Wexler
Recording engineer: Tom Dowd

Side A

1. "Oh! What a Fool I've Been" (Darryl Carter, Lindon Dewey Oldham, Wallace Pennington) - 2:36
2. "Blues Stay Away from Me" (Alton Delmore, Henry Glover, Rabon Delmore, Wayne Raney) - 3:22
3. "Don't Let Me Lose This Dream" (Ted White, Aretha Franklin) - 2:20
4. "Knock on Wood" (Eddie Floyd, Steve Cropper) - 3:30
5. "Do Right Woman, Do Right Man" (Chips Moman, Dan Penn) - 3:30
6. "Don't Fight It" (Steve Cropper, Wilson Pickett) - 2:25

Side B

1. "Sweet Inspiration" (Lindon Dewey Oldham, Wallace Pennington) - 2:50
2. "Let It Be Me" (Gilbert Bécaud, Mann Curtis, Pierre Delanoë) - 2:41
3. "I'm Blue" (Ike Turner) - 2:08
4. "Reach Out for Me" (Hal David, Burt Bacharach) - 2:19
5. "Here I Am (Take Me)" (David Porter, Isaac Hayes) - 3:04
6. "Why (Am I Treated So Bad)" (Roebuck Staples) - 2:46

== Production ==
- Design: Loring Eutemey
- Producer: Tom Dowd, Tommy Cogbill
- Supervised: Jerry Wexler
- Recording engineers: Chips Moman, Daryl Carter
- Stephen Paley - cover photograph

== Charts ==
Chart (1968)	Peak position
U.S. Billboard Top Pop Albums	90
U.S. Billboard Top Soul Albums	12

=== Singles ===
Year	Title	Chart	Peak position
1967	"Why (Am I Treated so Bad)"	Hot 100 Singles	57
1967	"Why (Am I Treated so Bad)"	Hot Soul Singles	36
1967	"Let It Be Me"	Hot 100 Singles	94
1967	"Let It Be Me"	Hot Soul Singles	13
1968	"Sweet Inspiration"	Hot 100 Singles	18
1968	"Sweet Inspiration"	Hot Soul Singles	5
