= Sweets for My Sweet (album) =

Studio album by Sweet Inspirations
- Released: 20 June 1969
- Recorded: April 1968
- Genre: funk, soul, R&B
- Length: 30:17
- Label: Atlantic Records
- Producer: Tom Dowd

Sweet Inspirations chronology
What the World Needs Now Is Love (1968)	Sweets for My Sweet (1969)	Sweet Sweet Soul (1970)

Singles from Sweets for My Sweet
- 1. "Crying in the Rain" Released: March 1969

Sweets for My Sweet is a 1969 album by American recording soul/gospel female group Sweet Inspirations released on Atlantic Records. The album features the groups cover of "Crying in the Rain" which peaked to #42 on Billboards Hot Soul Singles. The song was originally recorded by The Everly Brothers and reached #6 on Billboards Hot 100 chart.

Other tracks included are covers of Marvin Gayes' hit "Chained" and The Drifters' "Sweets for My Sweet". Following the album's release, 'Sweet Inspirations' lead singer Cissy Houston left the group to pursue a solo career. Houston released several albums, and also supported daughter Whitney Houston throughout her music career.

== Track listing ==
Side A

1. "But You Know I Love You" - 2:34
  - Written by Mike Settle
2. "Chained" - 2:15
  - Written by Frank Wilson
3. "It's Not Easy" - 3:06
  - Written by Mann & Weil
4. "Get a Little Order" - 2:05
  - Written by Emily Houston, Sylvia Shemwell
5. "Don't Go" - 2:14
  - Written by Ashford & Simpson, Jo Armstead
6. "It's All Worth It" - 2:58
  - Written by Wayne Jackson

Side B

1. "Sweets for My Sweet" - 2:39
  - Written by Doc Pomus, Mort Shuman
2. "Every Day Will Be Like a Holiday" - 2:29
  - Written by Booker T. Jones, William Bell
3. "Let Me Be Lonely" - 3:54
  - Written by Hal David-Burt Bacharach
4. "Crying in the Rain" - 2:26
  - Written by Carol King, Howard Greenfield
5. "Always David" - 3:26
  - Written by Eddie Hinton

== Credits ==
- Producer: Tom Dowd
- Supervised: Jerry Wexler

== Charts ==
=== Singles ===
Year	Title	Chart	Peak position
1969	"Crying in the Rain"	Hot Soul Singles	42
