= Sweet Inspiration (The Sweet Inspirations song) =

1967 single written by Penn & Oldham

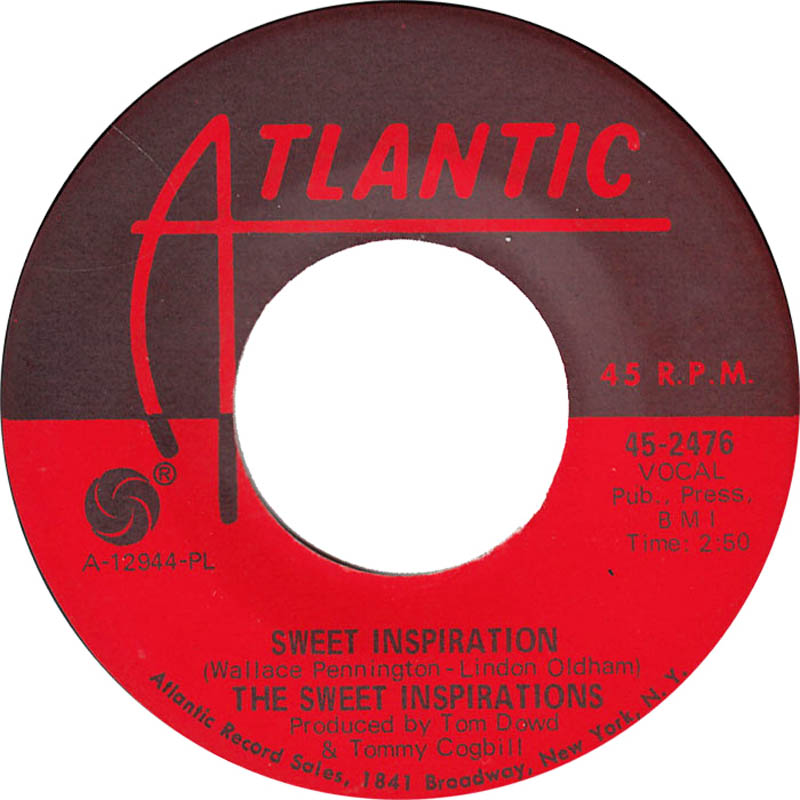
- Side A of the US single

Single by the Sweet Inspirations

from the album The Sweet Inspirations
- B-side: "I'm Blue"
- Released: February 1968
- Recorded: 1967
- Length: 2:50
- Label: Atlantic
- Songwriters: Wallace Pennington, Lindon Oldham
- Producers: Tom Dowd, Tommy Cogbill

Sweet Inspiration is the title of a Dan Penn and Spooner Oldham composition written for, and first recorded in 1967 by, the Sweet Inspirations. It became a Top 20 hit reaching No. 18 on the Billboard Hot 100 in the spring of 1968, and a live version by Barbra Streisand, in medley with "Where You Lead", would also become a Top 40 hit.

== Background ==
The song was recorded in April 1967 at American Sound Studio in Memphis in the sessions for the Sweet Inspirations' self-titled debut album, produced by Tommy Cogbill and Tom Dowd. Spooner Oldham and Dan Penn had observed the recording session for two tracks intended for the album, which moved Oldham to suggest to Penn that they two could write a stronger song for the group - (Oldham quote:) "As we walked [from the studio] up the steps to [the company's] offices, Dan said, 'You got any ideas?' I said, 'What's wrong with "Sweet Inspiration"?'" Working with a single guitar, Oldham and Penn wrote "Sweet Inspiration" in somewhere between an hour to ninety minutes upstairs, then returned to the studio and ran through the song for the Sweet Inspirations and the other session personnel, Penn singing the song to Oldham's guitar accompaniment. Although Tom Dowd called for a lunch break (Dan Penn quote:) "Spooner had [the opening rolling guitar] lick down so good the musicians wouldn't go eat...They knew by what was happening we could [immediately] cut [the track]," which was completed in a single take. Upon returning to the studio from their lunch break, Dowd and his coterie were played the completed track of "Sweet Inspiration" - (Oldham quote:) "We basically gave 'em a gift. It was fun to see a creative idea come to fruition in about three hours' time."

Issued as the fourth single from The Sweet Inspirations album, "Sweet Inspiration" reached a Billboard Hot 100 peak of No. 18 in the spring of 1968 and ranked as high as No. 5 on Billboard's R&B chart. The song also gave the group their first and only Grammy nomination, for Best R&B Vocal Performance by a Duo or Group. At the 1969 ceremony, the group lost to the Temptations' "Cloud Nine".

== Barbra Streisand version ==
Barbra Streisand reached No. 37 on the Billboard Hot 100 with her 1972 single "Sweet Inspiration/ Where You Lead" a medley of "Sweet Inspiration" with "Where You Lead" which was the advance single from Streisand's live album Live Concert at the Forum.

== Other versions ==
The first evident recorded "cover" of "Sweet Inspiration" was that by Diana Ross and the Supremes in collaboration with the Temptations on Diana Ross & The Supremes Join The Temptations a collaborative album by the two groups released November 1968 for which "Sweet Inspiration" was recorded with Diana Ross and Eddie Kendricks as lead vocalists.

Wilson Pickett recorded "Sweet Inspiration" for his March 1970 album release Right On, Pickett having recorded "Sweet Inspiration" in a 29 August 1969 session at Criteria Studios (Miami) produced by Dave Crawford, which yielded five album tracks.

In the autumn and winter of 1975-76, the Yandall Sisters would have a Top 40 hit in New Zealand with their remake of "Sweet Inspiration", which would peak at No. 8 on 31 October 1975.

In 1989, Dutch female quartet Sisters reached No. 58 on the Nederlands Single Top 100 with their remake of "Sweet Inspiration" taken from the group's album Near Me.
