= Songs of Faith & Inspiration =

Studio album by Cissy Drinkard & The Sweet Inspirations
- Released: 1968
- Recorded: June 1967
- Genres: gospel, soul
- Length: 34:12
- Label: Atlantic
- Producer: Tom Dowd

Cissy Drinkard & The Sweet Inspirations chronology
The Sweet Inspirations (1967)	Songs of Faith & Inspiration (1968)	What the World Needs Now Is Love (1968)

Songs of Faith & Inspiration is the second album by American recording gospel/soul female group the Sweet Inspirations, released in the U.S. on Atlantic Records in 1968. The album is the follow-up to the group's self-titled debut The Sweet Inspirations, and the sound is predominantly centered in the gospel genre.

The tracks were written by Cissy Drinkard (better known as Cissy Houston), Myrna Smith, Estelle Brown, and Sylvia Shernwell; the group's official name for the album is Cissy Drinkard & The Sweet Inspirations.

== Track listing ==
Side A

1. "What a Friend" - 3:55
  - (Written by Cissy Drinkard, Sweet Inspirations)
2. "I Shall Know Him" - 3:05
  - (Written by Cissy Drinkard, Sweet Inspirations)
3. "Swing Low" - 3:04
  - (Written by Cissy Drinkard, Sweet Inspirations)
4. "Guide Me" - 4:09
  - (Written by Cissy Drinkard, Sweet Inspirations)
5. "Looking on the Bright Side" - 2:46
  - (Written by Cissy Drinkard, Sweet Inspirations)

Side B

1. "He'll Fight" - 4:51
  - (Written Cissy Drinkard, Sweet Inspirations)
2. "Without a Doubt" - 2:33
  - (Written by Cissy Drinkard, Sweet Inspirations)
3. "The 23rd Psalm" - 4:23
  - (Written by Cissy Drinkard, Sweet Inspirations)
4. "Down by the Riverside" - 2:21
  - (Written by Cissy Drinkard, Sweet Inspirations)
5. "Pilgrims of Sorrow" - 3:11
  - (Written by Cissy Drinkard, Sweet Inspirations)

== Personnel ==
- Producer: Tom Dowd
- Supervised: Jerry Wexler
