= Van Morrison: No Surrender =

Biography of musician Van Morrison, written by Johnny Rogan

- Book cover, 2005 edition
- Author: Johnny Rogan
- Language: English
- Subject: Van Morrison
- Genre: Biography
- Publisher: Secker & Warburg
- Publication place: Northern Ireland
- Media type: Hardcover
- Pages: 640
- ISBN: 0-436-20566-1
- OCLC: 60377037
- Dewey Decimal: 782.42164092 22
- LC Class: ML420.M63 R64 2005
- Preceded by: Van Morrison: A Portrait of the Artist (1984)

Van Morrison: No Surrender is a biography of musician Van Morrison, written by Johnny Rogan. It was first published in 2005 by Secker & Warburg, and another edition was published by Vintage Books in 2006. Rogan interviewed musicians and friends of Morrison, and spent 20 years researching the book and four years writing it. The book is comprehensive, and goes into detail about multiple facets of Morrison's life. Rogan recounts Morrison's youth in Belfast, Northern Ireland, and how early experiences there informed his music. He discusses how Morrison joined various bands before experiencing success with Them. Morrison later signed a contract with Bert Berns and moved to New York, where he became quite popular after recording "Brown Eyed Girl" and albums Astral Weeks and Moondance. Rogan comments on Morrison's exploration of spirituality, and describes how these experiences influenced his musical work. The biography discusses Morrison's move to Britain and then Dublin, and his relationship with model Michelle Rocca.

The book received mostly positive reviews in the media. Kirkus Reviews called it "a narrative of propulsive drive that is also a reflective, associative piece of social history," and The Sunday Independent described it as "an exhaustive study". The Sunday Times noted: "What makes this book worthwhile is its fiercely illuminating angle. ... Morrison, as usual, declined to take part but the author's scholarly methods lend this weighty volume a real authority." The Irish Times referred to the biography as a "superb book", and a review in The Observer stated "This characteristically accomplished biography shows the singer from every angle." Diarmaid Ferriter selected the book as his pick in The Sunday Business Post feature "Authors' choices". The book received negative reviews in The Toronto Star and The Herald.

== Research and publication ==
Prior to completing the book, Rogan had written music biographies on The Byrds, The Smiths, and Neil Young. According to Kirkus Reviews, "there is nary a word directly from the reclusive Morrison's lips" in the book. The Irish Independent reported that the author relied on interviews with "friends, acquaintances and musicians". Rogan spent over 20 years researching the book, and it took him four years to write it.

Rogan recounted to The Irish Times the value he obtained from interviews with Morrison's first wife, as well as his partner in a later relationship, Michelle Rocca. "Here was a man who had explored all these mystic religions, had undergone Gestalt therapy, who had been told by a Rosacrucian master that he had something called an 'Angelic Knot', suddenly hanging around fashionable nightclubs and being written about in gossip columns. The relationship with Michelle Rocca certainly helped, in that I got more out of one single interview done by Michelle Rocca than I did, in entirety, from his first wife, Janet Planet," said Rogan.

When it became public in early 2005 that the book would be published, representatives of Morrison contacted the publishers of the book. Said Rogan to The Irish Times: "There has been contact with the publishers, I know that much. When the news broke earlier this year that the book was being published, his lawyers asked to see an advance copy of the manuscript. The publishers refused the request. But then this is a man who when he learnt that there was going to be a plaque erected outside his former Belfast home, got his solicitors to write to the Belfast Telegraph dissociating himself from the tribute." The book was first published in 2005 by Secker & Warburg, and a 2006 edition was published by Vintage Books. Johnny Rogan appeared on a panel of experts in the 2008 documentary Van Morrison: Under Review 1964–1974, along with Steve Turner, author of the 1993 biography Van Morrison: Too Late to Stop Now.

== Contents ==
Rogan writes in the book's introduction: "an important caveat to any serious, well-researched biography or study of Morrison's life is that the reader should be aware that a number of allegations against the subject cannot be featured in print for legal reasons. The author may feel that the final portrayal is far too flattering in certain places, while the reader who neglects to read between the lines may think the biographer could have been a little more sympathetic at times. Death alone will open this Pandora's box." Morrison himself is quoted on the first page of the book, saying: "Rogan's got something to hide. What's he hiding? I'd like to do a book on him."

The biography is comprehensive, covering many different aspects of its subject's life. The author discusses Morrison's early life in Belfast, Northern Ireland, and how this influenced his perspective of "no surrender", a reference to Ulster Unionism. Rogan writes how, a young boy, Morrison exhibited "poor communication skills, aggressive impatience, and absence of empathy", and yearned for positive relations between his Protestant and Catholic friends. The author notes that a theme of Morrison's youth was his appreciation of music and his pleasure of creating music influenced by gospel and love. He cites Morrison's cousin Jackie Stitt who said: "He could have been a good sportsman but he had no interest in it at all. He'd play along with you for a while until he got bored – he seemed to tire of it quickly. He'd go indoors."

Morrison did not excel at academics, and focused instead on music. He practised his music in solitude, and was not skilled at socialising. "One time he said to me it wasn't that he didn't want to talk, but tunes were running through his head all the time. He said he didn't know whether he'd been blessed or cursed because the words and music wouldn't go out of his head," said his mother Violet.

The book focuses on Morrison's musical profession. Morrison joined a band called The Sputniks, which became The Javelins. He joined up with a showband called the Monarchs, then another called Manhattan, and another called the Gamblers. The Gamblers became the group Them, and Morrison developed his stage presence. "He was a wee runt. Offstage you wouldn't have looked sideways at him. But on stage it was different. There was an animalistic sexuality that he didn't have in his person," said a female fan of Morrison's who witnessed him perform with the band.

The band Them was signed by Phil Solomon, who contracted producer Bert Berns to work with the group, and Phil Coulter came on as a musical arranger and lyricist. The group became popular with songs including "Baby Please Don't Go", "Gloria", and "Here Comes the Night". Morrison commented of Them: "Them were never meant to be on Top of the Pops. I mean, miming? lip syncing? We used to laugh at that programme, think it was a joke. Then we were on it ourselves. It was ridiculous. We were totally anti that sort of thing. We were really into the blues... and we had to get into suits and have make-up put on and all that shit."

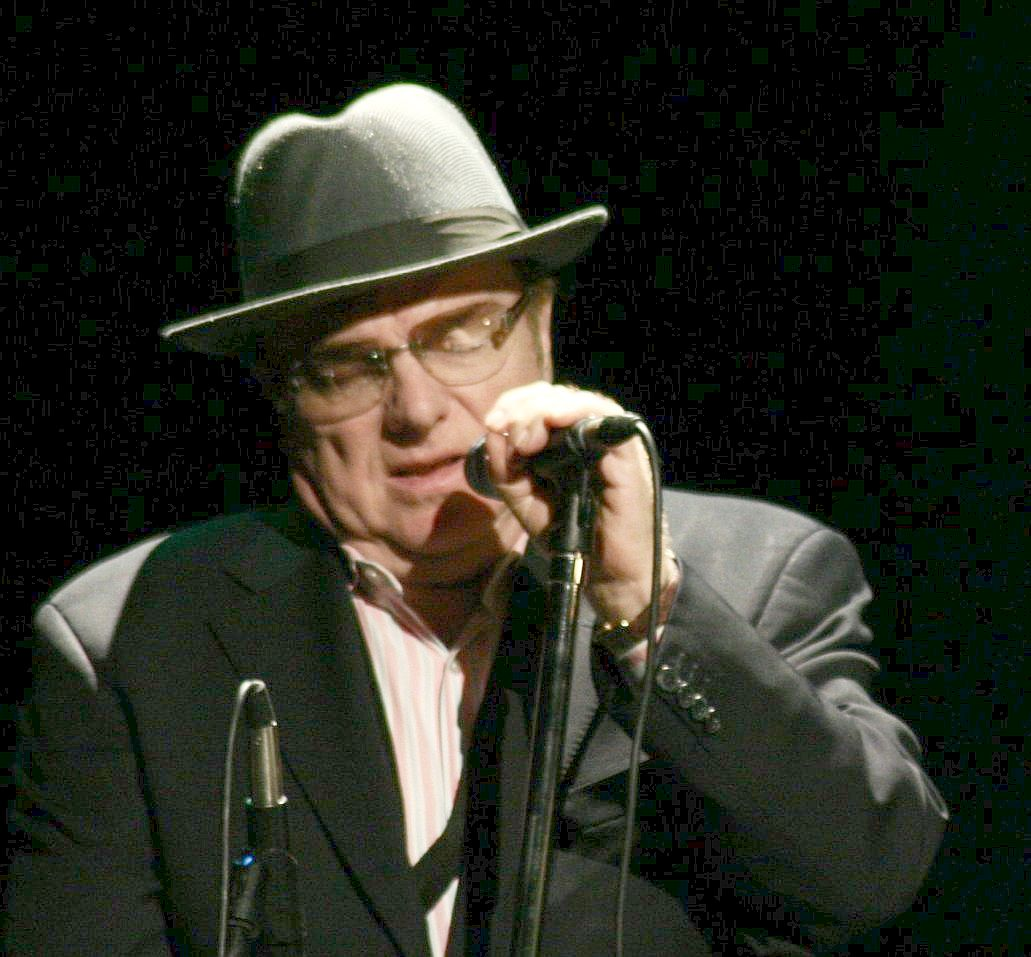
Van Morrison in 2007

The group were not sociable with reporters, and according to the book Morrison's drinking habits made him reclusive. "I regret that we couldn't have controlled Morrison better... I think he would have been big if he'd been straightened out at the beginning of his career," comments Phil Solomon about Morrison. "He was on a downer and he was drinking. He wasn't the most bankable of artists. He had been the frontman for another of those R & B bands that had gone up the Swanee and there were three or four versions of Them touring. It was a joke. He was no gift. There weren't record companies falling over themselves to sign him up." says Phil Coulter in the book.

Morrison signed a contract with Bert Berns, and just before he left for New York made a speech to his friends and ended with: "One day you'll see my picture up on the wall and you'll all say 'I knew him'." An acquaintance who witnessed the speech told the author: "He knew he was different and that his music was good but I thought he was such a nasty character; always rude and quite vulgar." Morrison recorded the song "Brown Eyed Girl" in New York with Berns, as well as the album Astral Weeks. He became much more popular with the album Moondance, and Rolling Stone commented he had "the striking imagination of a consciousness that is visionary in the strongest sense of the word". Morrison's image appeared on the cover of Rolling Stone a year after releasing Moondance.

Rogan discusses Morrison's exploration of religion and spirituality. He cites Tom Paulin, a poet based in Belfast, who notes: "Morrison comes out of not traditional Protestantism, but evangelical Protestantism. That's the foundation of his imagination. He's testifying." Rogan recounts how Morrison became exposed to alternative practices including Gestalt therapy and Rosicrucianism. According to Rogan, Morrison's exploration of mysticism, Christianity, Jehovah's Witnesses, and Scientology were influential in his works including Astral Weeks, "Kingdom Hall", Enlightenment and "Whenever God Shines His Light". Morrison became wealthy through his music, but he became less successful over the next 20 years of his career. He moved back to Europe, and lived in Britain and then settled in Dublin in the 1990s. He met model Michelle Rocca at a fundraiser held at Leixlip Castle, and they began a relationship.

== Reception ==
"Sprightly despite its amplitude, a narrative of propulsive drive that is also a reflective, associative piece of social history."

— Kirkus Reviews

A review of the book in Kirkus Reviews described it as a "nearly breath-by-breath biography", and comments: "Rogan's analyses of Morrison's musical palette, critical standing and public image are exhaustive yet never exhausting. ... Sprightly despite its amplitude, a narrative of propulsive drive that is also a reflective, associative piece of social history." The title of a review in the Irish Independent referred to the book as "an enthralling new biography of the Belfast cowboy", and The Sunday Independent called it "an exhaustive study of Belfast's most famous musical son". A review in The Observer commented of the book: "This characteristically accomplished biography shows the singer from every angle."

Robert Sandall gave the book a positive review in The Sunday Times, and wrote: "What makes this book worthwhile is its fiercely illuminating angle. ... Morrison, as usual, declined to take part but the author's scholarly methods lend this weighty volume a real authority." The Journal Gazette called the book: "A definitive, provocative and revelatory portrait of an endlessly complicated man and his music." A review in The Irish Times characterised the book as a "magical" journey into Van Morrison's life, noting: "Johnny Rogan spent 23 years researching his biography of Van Morrison. It shows. In a book that really should have been titled Everything You Always Wanted To Know About Van Morrison But Were Too Petrified To Ask, this is a magical 'into the mystic' journey which vertiginously takes you from Edward Carson to Leadbelly, from the Mafia to the Rosacrucians, from drinking stories to Gestalt therapy, and from Bernadette Devlin to Terry Keane." Brian Boyd of The Irish Times described Rogan's work as a "superb book".

Diarmaid Ferriter selected the book as his pick in The Sunday Business Post feature "Authors' choices". Ferriter commented: "Rogan has to be admired for his perseverance and determination when it comes to chronicling the life and times of contrary musical giants – having previously tackled Morrissey. Well-researched biography is always to be encouraged, particularly when dealing with a difficult and elusive character". David Sinclair, author of Wannabe: How The Spice Girls Reinvented Pop Fam, reviewed the book for The Guardian, and commented: "Rogan's scrutiny of Morrison's work is undertaken with no less care than that devoted to the details of the singer's life story, and the analysis and appreciation of Morrison's very real accomplishments as a musician provide some welcome ballast to a personal portrayal that is otherwise almost comically unflattering. Rogan's book certainly sheds new light on the life and times of this puzzling and reclusive performer." Sinclair also noted the book takes a negative tone towards some of Morrison's mannerisms, and concluded his review with: "But it may be as well to get hold of a copy before Morrison's legal representatives have had a chance to get out their fine-tooth combs."

Jonathan O'Brien recommended the book in a review in The Sunday Business Post, but noted it focuses more on his life than an analysis of his music: "If you want a meticulously researched, mind-bogglingly detailed account of his early years growing up in Belfast, his schooldays in Orangefield, his time as an unpopular member of the Olympics showband and so on, then, once again, No Surrender is heartily recommended. If, however, you're expecting a rigorous and comprehensive analysis of Morrison's music, of its textures, its surfaces – how and why it sounds the way it does – then you've probably come to the wrong place." O'Brien concluded his review by writing: "For all its flaws, No Surrender is a strong, absorbing biography, and never less than well written. It's just that it could potentially have been far, far better." John Beck of The Press Democrat observed that the biography "paints him [Morrison] as a mercurial genius at best and a cantankerous lout on a bad day". In their 2008 book Northern Ireland After the Troubles, Colin Coulter and Michael Murray referenced the biography and stated it puts forth "the view that Morrison's persona has been shaped by a specifically Ulster Protestant sensibility". Bernard Perusse of The Gazette described the earlier biography Van Morrison: Too Late to Stop Now as "more superficial but more positive" than Rogan's book.

Kevin Courtney reviewed the book for The Irish Times, and observed: "For fans of Van Morrison's music, No Surrender might seem somewhat blasphemous, focusing not so much on Van the artist, but on Van the not-very-nice man. But Rogan also pays tribute to Morrison's pure, untainted artistry, and details the development – and subsequent decline – of Morrison's muse over the past 40 years or so. For the serious Van-ologist, Rogan's painstaking research yields an abundance of detail about Morrison's early years". Graeme Green of the Daily Express noted that Rogan "concentrates far more on Van the man than it does on his music, with the singer largely portrayed as difficult, selfish and aloof". He noted that Morrison would turn 60 the year the book was published, and commented "When the singer celebrates his landmark birthday this year, it's a safe bet Rogan's name won't be on the invite list."

Nick Krewen gave the book a negative review in The Toronto Star. Krewen critiqued what he saw as the thesis to Rogan's book, commenting: "Here is the premise of Van Morrison: No Surrender: Because the Belfast-born Morrison was raised in Ulster ... and subjected to violent religious prejudice, the musician embodies a symbolic metaphor of Northern Ireland's defiant nature. That's it." Krewen noted that "the book does capture Van the Man's evolution into an electrifying showman during his Monarchs and Them years." The book also received a negative review from Martin Tierney in The Herald, who wrote: "The title here is more than a little contrived as Rogan attempts to draw parallels with the sectarian troubles in Morrison's home turf and the maestro himself. It doesn't work, given that Morrison has never been political, thankfully sticking to music. It is, however, detailed and comprehensive in its sources, and as such carries on that great tradition of bashing the odious one."

== See also ==
- Van Morrison: Too Late to Stop Now
