= The Sweet Inspirations =

American R&B vocal group

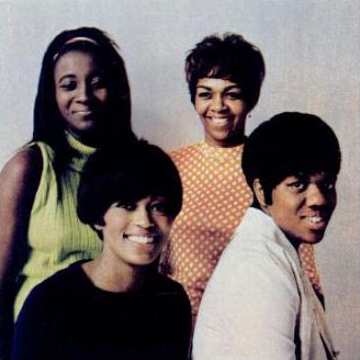
- The Sweet Inspirations in 1967: l-r (Sylvia Shemwell, Cissy Houston, Myrna Smith and Estelle Brown)

Background information
- Origin: Newark, New Jersey, U.S.
- Genres: Soul, gospel, R&B
- Years active: 1967–1979, 1994–present
- Members: Estelle Brown; Portia Griffin; Kelly Jones
- Past members: Cissy Houston; Sylvia Shemwell; Myrna Smith; Ann Williams; Gloria Brown; Patricia Terry

The Sweet Inspirations are an American R&B girl group from Newark, New Jersey, founded by American singer Cissy Houston. The group was mostly known for their work as backup singers on studio recordings for other popular music artists but were also a relatively successful group in their own right, earning several charted singles between 1967 and 1970.

Formed by Houston in 1963 in Newark under the informal title "The Girls", they were the offshoot of a previous group called the Gospelaires, founded by Houston's nieces and future soul stars Dionne and Dee Dee Warwick, Myrna Smith and Sylvia Shemwell. Under Houston's direction, the group would include Shemwell, Smith and Estelle Brown.

As session singers, they participated in hit records by Aretha Franklin, Solomon Burke, Otis Redding, Jimi Hendrix, Van Morrison, Dusty Springfield and Elvis Presley. Signed to Atlantic Records in 1967, the group had their biggest hit with the aptly titled "Sweet Inspiration", which won them a Grammy Award nomination, making them just the third all-female vocal group in history to earn a Grammy nomination. They were also known for their rendition of "I'm Blue", which was the b-side of "Sweet Inspiration" and later was sampled famously by Salt-N-Pepa's hit "Shoop".

Following their first couple of months performing with Presley in Las Vegas, Houston left the group to raise her family and forge a successful solo career while the rest of the group carried on with Presley and as a recording act.

The original Sweet Inspirations (Houston, Brown, Smith and Shemwell) were inducted into the second class of the National Rhythm and Blues Hall of Fame in 2014.

== History ==
=== Origins ===
The history of the Sweet Inspirations started at the New Hope Baptist Church in Newark, New Jersey during the 1950s where Emily "Cissy" Drinkard was the Minister of Music leading several youth choirs. Among the young singers she mentored were her preteen nieces Dionne and Dee Dee and adopted niece Judy Guions. By 1954, Judy had joined Cissy Drinkard's sibling gospel group the Drinkard Singers and future group members Sylvia Shemwell and Myrna Smith. Judy had been adopted by Cissy's sister Lee, another member of the Drinkard Singers and mother of Dionne and Dee Dee.

By 1958, Dionne, Dee Dee, Shemwell, Smith and a fifth girl, Gloria Harding, agreed to form the group the Gospelaires and eventually opened for the Drinkard Singers, finding success at the Apollo Theater in 1959 and were at this point being managed by Cissy's then-boyfriend John Houston. That year, while at the Apollo, a musician named Abie Baker came to the dressing room where the Gospelaires and John Houston were occupying and approached them backstage looking for background singers for a session for a musician named Sam "The Man" Taylor to which the Gospelaires agreed to sing on.

Following that session and another with The Drifters, the group became professional session vocalists. By September 1961, John Houston convinced Cissy to join a session for Ronnie Hawkins after Dionne began working with Burt Bacharach, which led to Cissy Drinkard, who would later go by the name of Cissy Houston, officially joining the group. Within a couple of years, Dee Dee and Harding all left the group. In 1963, Houston eventually replaced them with 17-year-old Estelle Brown, which formed the nucleus of the Sweet Inspirations.

"The Group", as they were informally called afterwards, was in high demand among producers, publishers, artists, and songwriters in the early 1960s and backed recordings made by the Warwick sisters, backing Dionne on her debut hit, "Don't Make Me Over" as well as Doris Troy's "Just One Look", Solomon Burke's "Cry to Me", and Garnet Mimms' "Cry Baby" and eventually began a long tenure backing Aretha Franklin, later singing background on Franklin's hits such as "Chain of Fools", "(You Make Me Feel Like A) Natural Woman", "(Sweet Sweet Baby) Since You've Been Gone", "Ain't No Way", "Think" and "I Say a Little Prayer". They were later cited as the first in-call backing vocal pop group.

=== Career ===
In a recording session on March 28, 1967, the group provided the backup vocals for Van Morrison on his classic hit "Brown Eyed Girl". It was released in June 1967 and rose to No. 10 on the Billboard Hot 100 charts. In October 2007, Morrison was awarded a Million-Air certificate by BMI for 8 million air plays of "Brown Eyed Girl". Shortly afterwards, the group was approached by Jerry Wexler to sign a recording deal with Atlantic Records, the parent label of Morrison's Bang label under the condition they sign as The Inspirations. After discovering that another group went by that name, the group's close friend, soul singer Chuck Jackson added "Sweet" in front of the name.

The Sweet Inspirations recorded by themselves for the first time in April 1967 for Atlantic Records. That session produced the first two singles released by Atlantic, a version of "Why (Am I Treated So Bad)," a song previously recorded by The Staple Singers and a soulful version of "Let It Be Me", a French song which had been a pop and R&B hit for Betty Everett and Jerry Butler in 1964. Though their first singles were only minor hits with "Let It Be Me" peaking inside the R&B top twenty, Atlantic was committed to the group, and an August session in Memphis yielded the bulk of songs used for the group's self-titled debut album, released in the late fall of 1967. Within a month of their chart climb, the group began work on their second album – a gospel record entitled Songs Of Faith & Inspiration. It was released in 1968 under the name "Cissy Drinkard & The Sweet Inspirations."

On March 30, 1968, the group scored their first and only top forty hit on the Billboard Hot 100 with the song "Sweet Inspiration" on Atlantic Records. The record was on the chart for ten weeks and peaked at number 18. The song earned the group a Grammy Award nomination for Best Rhythm & Blues Performance by a Duo or Group, Vocal or Instrumental, eventually losing to The Temptations' "Cloud Nine" at the 1969 ceremony. The group joined Martha and the Vandellas and The Supremes as the only other all-female vocal group in history to earn a Grammy nomination. The b-side of "Sweet Inspiration", a funky cover of The Ikettes' "I'm Blue", gained notoriety more than a quarter century later when it was sampled by hip-hop group Salt-N-Pepa's 1993 smash hit, "Shoop".

In 1967, the group did backing vocals for the Jimi Hendrix single "Burning of the Midnight Lamp" which was later featured on the album Electric Ladyland in 1968. They also backed Dusty Springfield on her album Dusty in Memphis.

Shortly after cutting the gospel set, the Sweet Inspirations were back in Atlantic's studios to record their third album, What the World Needs Now is Love, recorded at Muscle Shoals, Alabama with the Muscle Shoals Rhythm Section. The late April 1968 session produced a version of The Bee Gees' "To Love Somebody", which became the group's fourth R&B chart hit, and a version of The Righteous Brothers' "Unchained Melody," which gave the group a charted, though minor hit.

In 1969, the group recorded their fourth album, Sweets for my Sweet. The Sweet Inspirations also began recording and touring with Elvis Presley as both background singers and his warm-up act, as well as doing occasional live dates with Aretha Franklin. The association with Presley became well-publicized as he routinely introduced the Sweet Inspirations (along with the TCB Band members, the J. D. Sumner & Stamps Quartet, and Kathy Westmoreland) on his telecast concerts and live recordings. The Sweet Inspirations worked with Presley until his death in 1977.

Houston's last recording session with The Sweet Inspirations was in October 1969, since she wanted to pursue a solo career and concentrate on her family. The session produced the group's biggest R&B hit in some time. A Gamble & Huff composition, "Gotta Find Me A Brand New Lover" appeared on the group's fifth album Sweet Sweet Soul.

=== Later years ===
The remainder of the album was recorded in November 1970, with Shemwell, Brown, Smith, and new member Ann Williams, a friend of Brown's who stayed for what turned out to be the group's last full Atlantic album. Also included from that set are "That’s The Way My Baby Is", and "Flash In The Pan". A final Atlantic session in June 1970 brought the group (now a trio with Brown, Smith, and Shemwell) its last two singles for the label; "This World" (from the musical The Me Nobody Knows), and "Evidence".

In 1973, Brown, Smith, and Shemwell recorded an album for Stax Records. In 1978, the group sang backing vocals on Frankie Valli's No.1 hit "Grease" from the film of the same name. Estelle Brown quit the group that same year and was replaced by Gloria Brown, who toured with them but did not sing on the Sweet Inspirations’ last LP, Hot Butterfly, released on RSO Records in 1979, with singer Pat Terry featured on the actual recording. The group also provided backing vocals for The Bee Gees during their 1979 U.S. Spirits Having Flown Tour, only to break up shortly thereafter.

The Sweet Inspirations (Estelle Brown, Smith, and Shemwell) got back together again in 1994 with new member Portia Griffin. They performed at Elvis Presley tribute shows, and released new material in 2005. Shemwell suffered a stroke in 2001, which forced her into early retirement. They also recorded choir backing for The Killers' 2004 recording, Hot Fuss, on songs "Andy, You're a Star" and "All These Things That I've Done". Shemwell died on February 13, 2010.

In March 2010, while on a European tour for Elvis: The Concert, Smith developed pneumonia. Once back in the U.S., her condition continued to deteriorate, as she suffered kidney failure, further complicated by a severe stroke. By October 2010, she was a patient at the Canyon Oaks Nursing & Rehabilitation Center in Canoga Park, California. She died on December 24, 2010. Ann Williams died on October 1, 2013.

Smith was replaced with Los Angeles–based singer Kelly Jones; as of March 2011, the Sweet Inspirations are continuing to perform backup vocals with Elvis: The Concert and continue to do many concerts worldwide with Elvis Presley Enterprises' first ever "Ultimate Elvis Tribute Artist", Shawn Klush, sometimes as a duo and other times as a trio.

On October 7, 2024, group founder Cissy Houston died in her sleep from complications of Alzheimer's disease at the age of 91 in her home of Newark, New Jersey, leaving Estelle Brown as the only surviving member of the original group.

In 2014, Houston and Brown accepted the Sweet Inspirations' induction into the National Rhythm and Blues Hall of Fame, the same night Houston's daughter, Whitney, was posthumously inducted.

== Members ==
Current members

- Estelle Brown – contralto/2nd alto (1967–1979, 1994–present)
- Portia Griffin – soprano (1994–present)
- Kelly Jones – mezzo-soprano/soprano (2011–present)

Former members

- Cissy Houston – soprano/1st soprano (1967–1969; died 2024)
- Sylvia Shemwell – contralto/1st alto (1967–1979, 1994–2001; died 2010)
- Myrna Smith – soprano/2nd soprano (1967–1978, 1994–2010; died 2010)
- Ann Williams – soprano/1st soprano (1969–1970; died 2013)
- Gloria Brown – contralto (1978–1979)
- Patricia Terry – contralto (1978–1979)

== Discography ==
=== Albums ===
- 1967: The Sweet Inspirations (Atlantic)
- 1968: Songs of Faith & Inspiration (Atlantic)
- 1968: What the World Needs Now is Love (Atlantic)
- 1969: Sweets for My Sweet (Atlantic)
- 1970: Sweet Sweet Soul (Atlantic)
- 1973: Estelle, Myrna and Sylvia (Stax)
- 1974; Wanted Dead or Alive(Columbia)
- 1979: Hot Butterfly (RSO)
- 2005: In the Right Place (Frixion)

With Yusef Lateef

- 1968: The Blue Yusef Lateef (Atlantic)
- 1970: Suite 16 (Atlantic)
- 1970: The Diverse Yusef Lateef (Atlantic)
- 1971: The Gentle Giant (Atlantic)

=== Backing vocals ===
- 1967: Blowin' Your Mind!; Van Morrison
- 1967: Aretha Arrives; Aretha Franklin
- 1968: Lady Soul; Aretha Franklin
- 1968: Aretha Now; Aretha Franklin
- 1968: Electric Ladyland; The Jimi Hendrix Experience
- 1968: Goodies; George Benson
- 1969: Hey Jude; Wilson Pickett
- 1969: Elvis in Person at the International Hotel; Elvis Presley
- 1969: Dusty in Memphis; Dusty Springfield
- 1969: Do Your Own Thing; Brook Benton
- 1970: Turning Around; Dee Dee Warwick
- 1970: This Girl's in Love with You; Aretha Franklin
- 1970: That's the Way It Is; Elvis Presley
- 1970: Spirit in the Dark; Aretha Franklin
- 1970: Just a Little Lovin'; Carmen McRae
- 1971: Warm and Tender; Petula Clark
- 1971: Search and Nearness; The Rascals
- 1971: Thirds; James Gang
- 1972: As Recorded at Madison Square Garden; Elvis Presley
- 1972: Young, Gifted and Black Aretha Franklin
- 1973: Aloha From Hawaii: Via Satellite; Elvis Presley
- 1973: The Weapon; David Newman
- 1974: T.B. Sheets; Van Morrison
- 1974: Elvis Recorded Live on Stage in Memphis; Elvis Presley
- 1977: Elvis in Concert; Elvis Presley
- 1978: Frankie Valli... Is the Word; Frankie Valli
- 1978: New Beginnings; Cockrell & Santos
- 1979: Reddy; Helen Reddy
- 1998: Undiscovered Soul; Richie Sambora
- 2004: Hot Fuss; The Killers
- 2006: Elvis Lives: The 25th Anniversary Concert (DVD)

== Charts ==
=== Albums ===
Year	Title	Chart	Peak position
1968	The Sweet Inspirations	U.S. Top Pop Albums	90
1968	The Sweet Inspirations	U.S. Top R&B Albums	12

=== U.S. chart singles ===
Year	Title	Chart	Peak position
1967	"Why (Am I Treated So Bad)"	Hot Pop Singles	57
1967	"Why (Am I Treated So Bad)"	Hot Soul Singles	36
1967	"Let It Be Me"	Hot Pop Singles	94
1967	"Let It Be Me"	Hot Soul Singles	13
1968	"Sweet Inspiration"	Hot Pop Singles	18
1968	"Sweet Inspiration"	Hot Soul Singles	5
1968	"To Love Somebody"	Hot Pop Singles	74
1968	"To Love Somebody"	Hot Soul Singles	30
1968	"What the World Needs Now Is Love"	Bubbling Under Hot 100 Singles	128
1968	"Unchained Melody"	Hot Pop Singles	73
1968	"Unchained Melody"	Hot Soul Singles	41
1969	"Crying in the Rain"	Hot Soul Singles	42
1970	"(Gotta Find) A Brand New Lover"	Hot Soul Singles	25
1971	"Evidence"	Hot Soul Singles	44
1979	"Love Is on the Way"	Hot Dance Music Club/Play	26
2005	"Celebration"	Hot Dance Music Club/Play	34
