= Let It Be Me (The Everly Brothers song) =

1955 single by Gilbert Bécaud and Everly Brothers

"Je t'appartiens"

Single by Gilbert Bécaud
- Released: 1955
- Genre: Pop
- Songwriters: Pierre Delanoë (lyrics); Gilbert Bécaud (music)

"Let It Be Me"

Single by The Everly Brothers
- B-side: "Since You Broke My Heart"
- Released: 1960
- Recorded: December 1959
- Genre: Pop
- Length: 2:33
- Label: Cadence
- Songwriters: Gilbert Bécaud, Manny Curtis, Pierre Delanoë
- Producer: Archie Bleyer

The Everly Brothers singles chronology
"(Till) I Kissed You" (1959)	"Let It Be Me" (1960)	"Cathy's Clown" (1960)

"Let It Be Me"

Single by Betty Everett and Jerry Butler

from the album Delicious Together
- B-side: "Ain't That Loving You Baby"
- Released: 1964
- Recorded: 1964
- Genre: R&B
- Length: 2:44
- Label: Vee-Jay
- Songwriters: Gilbert Bécaud, Manny Curtis, Pierre Delanoë

Betty Everett and Jerry Butler singles chronology
"Everett: I Can't Hear You" (1964)	"Let It Be Me" (1964)	"Everett: Getting Mighty Crowded" (1964)

"Let It Be Me" is a 1960 single by the Everly Brothers. The song is an English-language cover of "Je t'appartiens", which had been released as a single in France by Gilbert Bécaud in 1955. The song was a top ten hit for the Everly Brothers on the US Billboard Hot 100 and spawned many additional cover versions.

== Background and release ==
"Let It Be Me" is based on "Je t'appartiens", which was written by Gilbert Bécaud and his frequent collaborator, lyricist Pierre Delanoë. Delanoë reportedly wrote the lyrics for Bécaud as an apology for missing one of the singer's performances at the Olympia in Paris. The song, sung by Bécaud, was released as a single by His Master's Voice in 1955.

The Everly Brothers recorded their version of "Let It Be Me" after the song was recommended to them by producer Archie Bleyer. They recorded the song in December 1959 in New York with guitarists Howard Collins, Barry Galbraith, and Mundell Lowe; bassist Lloyd Trotman, pianist Hank Rowland, and drummer Jerry Allison. The song was released by Cadence Records as a single in 1960, with "Since You Broke My Heart" as the B-side.

== Charts ==
Peak chart positions for "Let It Be Me" by The Everly Brothers
Chart (1960)	Peak position
Australia (Kent Music Report)	24
Canada (CHUM)	8
UK Singles (Official Charts)	13
US Billboard Hot 100	7

== Notable cover versions ==
=== Jill Corey ===
"Let It Be Me" was first adapted into English by Manny Curtis, and performed in 1957 by American singer Jill Corey as the character Linda Wallis on an episode (also titled "Let It Be Me") of the anthology television series Climax!. Corey's version of the song was released as a single by Columbia Records and reached number 57 on the Billboard Hot 100.

=== Betty Everett and Jerry Butler ===
American singers Betty Everett and Jerry Butler released their version of "Let It Be Me" from their album Delicious Together on Vee-Jay Records in 1964. The song peaked at number five on the Billboard Hot 100, number 1 on Billboard's Hot R&B Singles chart, and number 28 in Canada. On the New Zealand Lever Hit Parade chart it peaked at number six.

=== Johnny Young & Kompany ===
Australian singer Johnny Young, with his backing band Kompany, released "Let It Be Me" from his EP of the same name as a single on Clarion in 1966. It reached number 4 on the Kent Music Report chart, and was the 18th highest charting single of the year in Australia.

=== The Sweet Inspirations ===
American R&B group The Sweet Inspirations released their version of "Let It Be Me" as a single (with the B-side "When Something is Wrong With My Baby") from their album The Sweet Inspirations on Atlantic Records in 1967. It reached number 94 on the Billboard Hot 100 and number 13 on the Hot R&B Singles chart.

=== Glen Campbell and Bobbie Gentry ===
American country singers Glen Campbell and Bobbie Gentry recorded "Let It Be Me" for their 1968 duet album Bobbie Gentry and Glen Campbell. The single, released the following year, peaked at number 36 on the Billboard Hot 100.

Bob Dylan

Bob Dylan recorded this in Nashville as part of his double album, Self Portrait, along with many other covers and several original songs, released June 8, 1970. In addition to arranging many of the covers and singing more in his “country” voice, Dylan included four songs recorded at the Isle of Wight Festival, August 31, 1969, including previously unreleased “Minstrel Boy” and Dylan’s first release of Quinn the Eskimo (The Mighty Quinn).

Nina Simone and Samuel Waymon

Nina Simone and her brother Samuel Waylon recorded this duet live at Fort Dix, New Jersey, on November 18th, 1971. The subsequent LP album of this concert, EMERGENCY WARD! was released in 1972 by RCA Victor without this track. It was finally included in a limited edition vinyl of the album by Sony Music in 2009, as an expanded digital edition in 2011, and as a re-mastered, re-released edition in 2014.

==== Charts ====
Peak chart positions for "Let It Be Me" by Glen Campbell and Bobbie Gentry
Chart (1969)	Peak position
Canada Adult Contemporary (RPM)	15
Canada Country Singles (RPM)	1
Canada Top Singles (RPM)	85
US Adult Contemporary (Billboard)	7
US Billboard Hot 100	36
US Hot Country Songs (Billboard)	14

=== Willie Nelson ===
==== Charts ====
Peak chart positions for "Let It Be Me" by Willie Nelson
Chart (1982)	Peak position
Canada Adult Contemporary (RPM)	1
Canada Country Tracks (RPM)	1
US Adult Contemporary (Billboard)	11
US Billboard Hot 100	40
US Hot Country Songs (Billboard)	2
