= What the World Needs Now Is Love (Sweet Inspirations album) =

Studio album by Sweet Inspirations
- Released: 1968
- Recorded: February 1968
- Genre: R&B, gospel, soul
- Length: 33:47
- Label: Atlantic
- Producer: Tom Dowd

Sweet Inspirations chronology
Songs of Faith & Inspiration (1968)	What the World Needs Now Is Love (1968)	Sweets for My Sweet (1969)

Singles from What the World Needs Now Is Love
- 1. "To Love Somebody" Released: May 1968; 2. "Unchained Melody" Released: August 1968

What the World Needs Now Is Love is the third album by American recording gospel/soul female group the Sweet Inspirations released in 1968 on the label Atlantic Records. The album was produced by Tom Dowd and arranged by Arif Mardin. It features their cover versions of the classic songs; "Alfie", "Unchained Melody", "What the World Needs Now Is Love" and the Bee Gees' "To Love Somebody".

The group's album scored two R&B hit singles; "To Love Somebody" peaked No. 30 and "Unchained Melody" which peaked No. 41 on the Billboard Hot Rhythm & Blues Singles chart. The album also includes three songs written by the group's lead vocalist Cissy Houston; for songs "I Could Leave You Alone", "You Really Didn't Mean It", and "Where Did It Go".

== Track listing ==
Side A
1."Alfie" - 3:19

(Written by Burt Bacharach, Hal David)

2."What the World Needs Now Is Love" - 2:58

(Written by Burt Bacharach, Hal David)

3."To Love Somebody" - 2:42

(Written by Robin Gibb, Barry Gibb)

4."Watch the One Who Brings You the News" - 2:38

(Written by Don Covay)

5."Am I Ever Gonna See My Baby Again" - 2:55

(Written by Ralph Bartey, Johnny Northern, Rudy Clark)

6."Unchained Melody" - 3:25

(Written by Alex North, Hy Zaret)

Side B
7."You Really Didn't Mean It" - 2:58

(Written Cissy Drinkard Houston)

8."Just Walk in My Shoes" - 2:21

(Written by Kay Lewis, Helen Lewis)

9."Where Did It Go" - 2:41

(Written by Cissy Drinkard Houston)

10."I Could Leave You Alone" - 2:16

(Written by Cissy Drinkard Houston)

11."That's How Strong My Love Is" - 2:13

(Written by Roosevelt Jamison)

12."I Don't Want to Go on Without You" - 2:57

(Written by Jerry Wexler, Bert Russell)

== Personnel ==
- Arranged by Arif Mardin
- Producer, Engineer - Tom Dowd
- Supervised by Jerry Wexler

== Charts ==
=== Singles ===
Year	Title	Chart	Peak position
1968	"To Love Somebody"	US Hot 100 Singles	74
1968	"To Love Somebody"	US Hot Rhythm & Blues Singles	30
1968	"Unchained Melody"	US Hot 100 Singles	73
1968	"Unchained Melody"	US Hot Rhythm & Blues Singles	41
