= Manny Curtis =

American songwriter (1911–1984)

Manny Curtis (born Emanuel Kurtz; November 15, 1911 – December 6, 1984) was an American songwriter. He wrote the lyrics for over 250 songs, including "In a Sentimental Mood" (1935) and "Let It Be Me" (1957). He was born in Brooklyn, New York, United States and died in San Francisco, California, United States.

He also used the pseudonyms Mann Curtis, Manny Curtis and Manny Kurtz.
