= Blowin' Your Mind! =

Studio album by Van Morrison
- Released: September 1967
- Recorded: 28–29 March 1967
- Genre: Rock, R&B, blue-eyed soul, blues
- Length: 35:32
- Label: Bang
- Producer: Bert Berns

Van Morrison chronology
Blowin' Your Mind! (1967)	Astral Weeks (1968)

Singles from Blowin' Your Mind!
- 1. "Brown Eyed Girl" b/w "Goodbye Baby"; 2. "Ro Ro Rosey" b/w "Chick-A-Boom"; 3. "Spanish Rose" b/w "Midnight Special"

Professional ratings
Review scores
Source	Rating
Allmusic	3/5 stars
Tom Hull	A

Blowin' Your Mind! is the debut studio album by Northern Irish musician Van Morrison, released in 1967. It was recorded 28–29 March 1967 and contained his first solo pop hit "Brown Eyed Girl". It was included by Rolling Stone as one of the 40 Essential Albums of 1967.

== Recording and release history ==
Morrison does not regard this record as a true album, as Bert Berns compiled and released it without his consent. A few months previously, Morrison had carelessly signed a contract that he had not fully studied and it stipulated that he would surrender virtually all control of the material he would record with Bang Records. The songs were recorded in March 1967, intended to be released on four separate singles.

Months later, Morrison recorded another batch of songs to fulfill his contract with Bang Records, which were never planned to be released, and were largely nonsensical joke songs. This session was widely bootlegged and eventually given an official release in 2017 as part of The Authorized Bang Collection.

The album jacket's psychedelic design was strongly disliked by Morrison and his fans, who felt it misrepresented his musical style. Greil Marcus described it as a "monstrously offensive, super psychedelic far out out-of-sight exploding" design. Morrison's then-wife, Janet Planet, said "He never has been, never will be anything approaching a psychedelic user – wants nothing to do with it, wants nothing to do with any drug of any kind". As the singer recalls, "I got a call saying it was an album coming out and this is the cover. And I saw the cover and I almost threw up, you know."

== Songs and reviews ==
Of the eight songs on the album, all were composed by Morrison except "Goodbye Baby (Baby Goodbye)" and the last song, "Midnight Special". Clinton Heylin contends that the first side of the album "makes for one of the great single-sided albums in rock", whereas Greil Marcus, the album's most hostile critic, found it "painfully boring, made up of three sweet minutes of 'Brown Eyed Girl' and... the sprawling, sensation-dulling 'T.B. Sheets'". "He Ain't Give You None" is an urban tale of "lust, jealousy and sexual disgust." It references Notting Hill Gate and Curzon Street in London, England, places Morrison would have been familiar with when he lived there during his earlier touring days. It contains the words, "You can leave now if you don't like what is happening." Brian Hinton compares "the delighted contempt of the singer, the song's graveyard pace, the stately organ and stinging guitar" to the Highway 61 period of Bob Dylan.

== Reception ==
Allmusic gave the album a 3-star rating and wrote that "Although Van Morrison's first solo album is remembered for containing the immortal pop hit "Brown Eyed Girl," Blowin' Your Mind! is actually a dry run for his masterpiece, Astral Weeks."

== Track listing ==
All tracks are written by Van Morrison, except where noted.

Side One
No.	Title	Length
1.	"Brown Eyed Girl"	3:03
2.	"He Ain't Give You None"	5:13
3.	"T.B. Sheets"	9:44

Side Two
No.	Title	Writer(s)	Length
1.	"Spanish Rose"		3:06
2.	"Goodbye Baby (Baby Goodbye)"	Wes Farrell, Bert Russell	2:57
3.	"Ro Ro Rosey"		3:03
4.	"Who Drove the Red Sports Car?"		5:35
5.	"Midnight Special"	Traditional; arranged by Bert Berns	2:51

1994 CD reissue bonus tracks (alternate takes)
No.	Title	Length
9.	"Spanish Rose"	3:38
10.	"Ro Ro Rosey"	3:09
11.	"Goodbye Baby (Baby Goodbye)"	2:39
12.	"Who Drove the Red Sports Car?"	3:49
13.	"Midnight Special"	2:46

== Personnel ==
Musicians

- Van Morrison – vocals, guitar, harmonica on "T.B. Sheets"
- Eric Gale, Al Gorgoni, Hugh McCracken – guitars
- Russ Savakus – bass
- Paul Griffin – piano
- Garry Sherman – organ
- The Sweet Inspirations – backing vocals on "Brown Eyed Girl" and "Midnight Special"
- Gary Chester – drums

Production

- Vic Anesini – mastering
- Brooks Arthur – engineer
- Bert Berns – arranger, director, producer, liner notes
- Adam Block – project director
- Bob Irwin – liner notes, reissue producer
- John Jackson – project director
- Garry Sherman – actual arranger, conductor, musical supervisor
- Rodriguez of Los Angeles – cover photography

== Charts ==
Chart (1967)	Peak position
US Billboard 200	182

== Sources ==
- Heylin, Clinton (2003). Can You Feel the Silence? Van Morrison: A New Biography, Chicago Review Press ISBN 1-55652-542-7
- Hinton, Brian (1997). Celtic Crossroads: The Art of Van Morrison, Sanctuary, ISBN 1-86074-169-X
- Rogan, Johnny (2006). Van Morrison: No Surrender, London:Vintage Books ISBN 978-0-09-943183-1

== External ==
- WFMU'S: Beware of the Blog Morrison's Contractual Obligation Album
