= Van Morrison: Too Late to Stop Now =

Biography of musician Van Morrison, by Steve Turner

- Book cover
- Author: Steve Turner
- Cover artist: Simon Jennings (design)
- Language: English
- Subject: Van Morrison
- Genre: Biography
- Publisher: Penguin Group, Bloomsbury Publishing
- Publication date: 1993
- Publication place: United States, Great Britain
- Media type: Hardcover
- Pages: 191
- ISBN: 0-670-85147-7
- OCLC: 28150567
- Dewey Decimal: 782.42164/092 B 20
- LC Class: ML420.M63 T87 1993

Van Morrison: Too Late to Stop Now is a biography of musician Van Morrison, written by Steve Turner. It was first published in 1993 in the United States by Penguin Group, and in Great Britain by Bloomsbury Publishing. Turner first met Van Morrison in 1985; he interviewed approximately 40 people that knew the subject in his research for the biography. Van Morrison did not think positively of the biography, and multiple newspapers reported he attempted to purchase all of the book's 25,000 copies. He sent a letter to the author asserting the 40 individuals interviewed for the book were not his friends, and accused Turner of "peddling distortions and inaccuracies about me personally".

The biography takes a pictorial format, and includes many photographs of Van Morrison and scenes relating to his life, including close-up shots and contact prints. Turner discusses Van Morrison's youth in Belfast, Northern Ireland, and how early experiences shaped his perceptions. Flautist John Payne was interviewed for the book, and comments on his work with Van Morrison on the album Astral Weeks. Turner discusses Van Morrison's reluctance to be interviewed or engage with the public, and includes quotes from the musician about this desire for privacy. The author discusses Van Morrison's efforts to seek out creativity, and his exploration of spirituality. The book concludes with an assessment of Van Morrison's experiences with religion.

The book was selected as "Editor's Choice" in the Sunday Age. Publishers Weekly's review of the book was critical of its "adulatory" tone, but called it a "necessity for fans", due to the inclusion of the discography. A review of the book for The Boston Globe commented "The value of the book is that it has at its heart the same subjects that most of Morrison's music has featured ... religion and spirituality." The Palm Beach Post noted that the biography provides "insights and updates as well as a solid background on Morrison's early life". The Sunday Times wrote that "the really interesting story here is told by the photographs". The Irish Times was critical of the book's text but wrote positively of the included photographs.

== Research and publication ==
Prior to his work on the biography, Steve Turner had previously written a book about the music group U2, titled U2: Rattle & Hum, and Eric Clapton, titled Conversations With Eric Clapton. Turner first met Van Morrison in 1985, while writing a book on religion's place in rock music. Turner characterised himself as someone who is "drawn to artists bothered by spiritual issues". In his research for the book, the author interviewed approximately 40 people that knew Van Morrison. Turner spoke with Van Morrison, and they discussed the musician's views on philosophy. Some of the photographs included in the book were obtained by Turner from a guitarist with Van Morrison's band Them.

According to The Sunday People, "though critics said it was an affectionate tribute about a nice man. Van went on to urge fans not to buy it." According to The Boston Globe, Van Morrison "disdained the book". In an interview with The Boston Globe, Turner commented on this: "He considers anything that reveals details of family background or anything like that an invasion of his privacy. He doesn't believe in biographies, and I do." When the biography came out in hardcover, Van Morrison sent Turner 36 statements from the book that he called "lies, gross exaggerations and innuendo". Van Morrison told Turner that none of the 40 individuals the author had interviewed for the biography were currently friends of his. The letter from Van Morrison to Turner concluded with: "I am very sorry that you feel you are entitled to earn a living by peddling distortions and inaccuracies about me personally." In his reply letter to Van Morrison, Turner wrote: "You may not think you are 'difficult' or 'introvert' but other people do and have the right to express their opinions." The Sunday Times reported that "Allegedly, Van's management even considered buying up all 25,000 copies of the book to pulp them," and this was also reported in The Independent. The Evening Times wrote that Van Morrison "reportedly tried to buy all the copies of a biography by Steve Turner." Representatives for Van Morrison did not confirm whether he attempted to purchase the 25,000 copies of the biography, and confirmed that "representatives of the singer discussed various possibilities". Van Morrison's manager, Chris O'Donnell, said of the musician: "He is not happy about books, period. He is an artist and stands up for himself – he doesn't want his private life raked over."

Steve Turner appeared on a panel of experts in the 2008 documentary Van Morrison: Under Review 1964–1974. Along with Turner was Johnny Rogan, author of the biographies Van Morrison: A Portrait of the Artist (1984) and Van Morrison: No Surrender (2005).

== Contents ==
The introduction to the book includes an analysis by the author of Van Morrison's skill to use "the stuff of his life". Turner compares Van Morrison with other musicians of the time period, including Robbie Robertson, Bob Dylan, and Neil Young. The book's 10 chapters contain a pictorial overview of the musician's professional work. The book's chapters are structured according to record releases of the musician. Pictures include images from locations where Van Morrison grew up in Belfast, contact prints from a photo shoot for a cover album with his wife at the time Janet Planet, and archived marketing photographs of a younger Van Morrison. The beginning of the book includes 10 close-up shots of the musician. The book also contains a complete discography of Van Morrison's work.

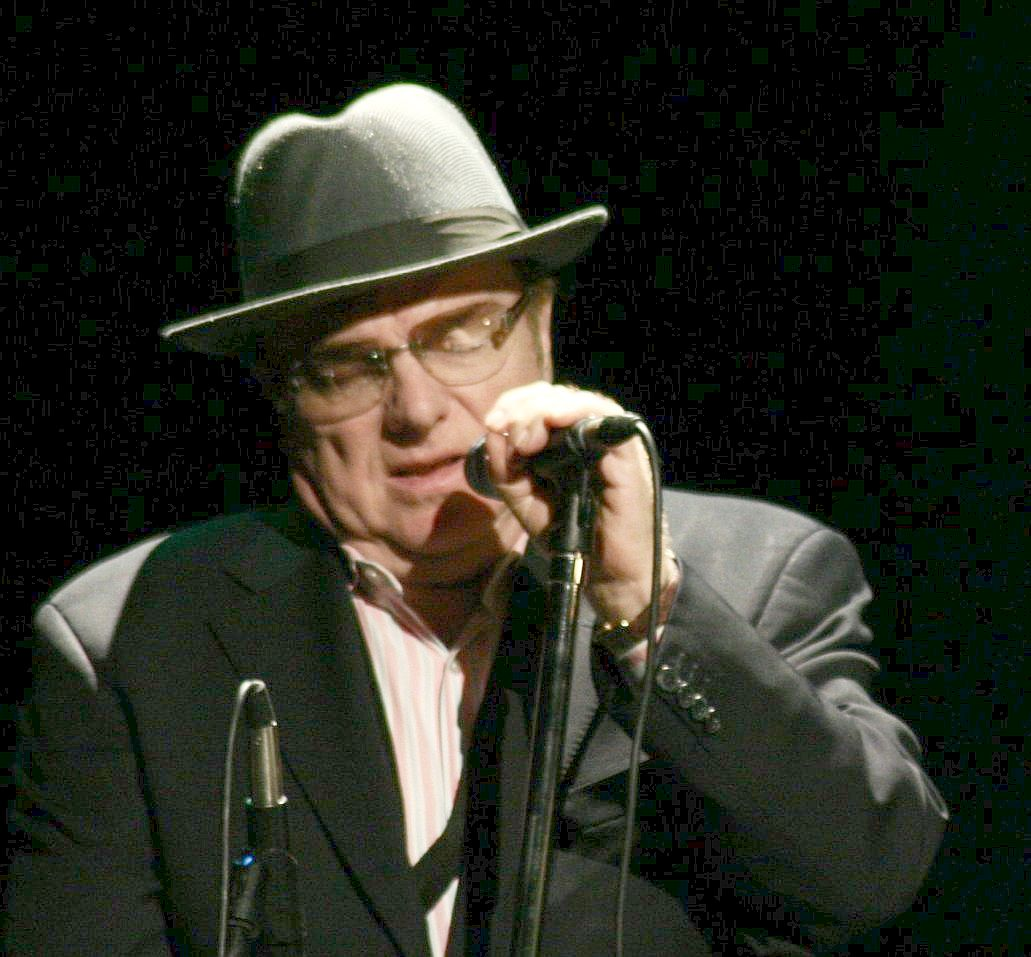
Van Morrison in 2007

Turner describes Van Morrison's early life as George Ivan Morrison on Hyndford Street in Belfast. "I'm definitely Irish", Van Morrison is quoted as stating in the book. He asserts that Van Morrison was affected by his mother's religious conversion to the Jehovah's Witnesses when he was a child. Turner states that this experience contributed to his position as an outcast: "Who else in Belfast had a father who played Jelly Roll Morton records, and a mother who indulged in doorstep evangelism?" Turner discusses Van Morrison's musical colleagues, his successes, the break-ups of his various bands, and his efforts to seek out creative expression. The author includes commentary and images from Van Morrison's first release with the band Them in 1964, through to his latest album at the time of the book's publication.

Turner interviewed flautist John Payne for the book, who had sat in on sessions with Van Morrison and later collaborated with him. Payne comments on their work together on the album Astral Weeks, which also included musicians Connie Kay, Warren Smith, Jay Berliner, and Richard Davis: "Ironically, the image you have when you listen to the album now is of these guys who are all together, and they realise they are creating a monumental work of art. The fact is that it was just another session for them." Payne states of his observations of Van Morrison's performance style: "When (Van) was on stage, he would look like a space cadet, but then he'd open his mouth and you would realize that he had channeled everything into the sound of his voice. The rest of it was just a shell that was there for the purpose of producing this noise."

The book notes the artist's reluctance to be interviewed or engage with the public, and quotes him as saying: "It's very hard for me to relate to people asking questions that are not only boring but don't have anything to do with my life ... It's a waste of time on my part because it drains me from doing what I really want to do, which is just to play music." Van Morrison describes his perceived musical role: "I just feel I'm doing the job. My job is to play music and deliver the show ... It's more emotional for the audience ... what they sort of think you are." He states that one of his motivations is "ideally to induce states of meditation and ecstasy, as well as to make people think".

The author notes Van Morrison's dislike of conformity, and quotes him as saying: "I hate organizations." Of his period in his life of experimentation, Van Morrison comments: "I'm not searching for anything in particular. I'm just groping in the dark ... for a bit more light. That's it really." Turner notes how musical styles including rhythm and blues and Motown influenced the musician. Van Morrison's exploration of spirituality is discussed in the book, including his experiences with mysticism, Christianity, and Dianetics. In the last chapter of the book, Turner comments on Van Morrison's experiences in religion, writing: "His development of religion as a normal topic of discourse in popular song may turn out to be his most lasting contribution."

== Reception ==
"A complete discography makes this book a necessity for fans of the Irish Rover."

— Publishers Weekly

The book was selected as "Editor's Choice" in the Sunday Age, where Michael Gordon wrote: "This is not the whole story, but it is a well-researched and superbly presented summary of the story so far – a kind of companion to the John Lennon book, 'Imagine' – including the temper tantrums. Fans may, however, disagree with the closing assessment that Morrison may be running out of themes and ideas to express." Publishers Weekly was critical of the book's tone, commenting: "Turner is more adulatory than probing." The review noted: "A complete discography makes this book a necessity for fans of the Irish Rover." Writing for The Boston Globe, Thomas C. Palmer Jr. called the book "a coffee-table biography that fills an extensive void, both for those hungry for gossip and for those who have wondered at the source of the creativity in this prolific producer of often stunningly original – if difficult to categorize – music". Palmer commented on the book's value: "The value of the book is that it has at its heart the same subjects that most of Morrison's music has featured, subtly or otherwise (but never as blatantly as Dylan in his "Saved" period): religion and spirituality." Robert Sandall reviewed the book for The Sunday Times, and wrote: "Steve Turner has performed his task as a biographer diligently enough in Too Late To Stop Now, but the really interesting story here is told by the photographs." Sandall commented: "Thirty years of constant rowing with anybody who has ever tried to get close to him, and a fitful and irritable hankering after religion (any religion) have left him looking bloated, sad and, as Turner has the courage and decency to point out, not as great a musician now as his current reputation would suggest. It's all there in the pictures."

Bernard Perusse of The Gazette described the book as "more superficial but more positive" than the 2006 biography Van Morrison: No Surrender by Johnny Rogan. In a review of the book for The Palm Beach Post, Lisa McDonough wrote "Steve Turner's Van Morrison: Too Late To Stop Now is not the final answer on Morrison – only Morrison could give that – but he does provide insights and updates as well as a solid background on Morrison's early life." Writing for The Irish Times, John Boland was critical of the book's text but wrote positively of its images: "Steve Turner's Van Morrison: Too Late to Stop Now, has a trite, fanzine style text and isn't very informative about the great man, but it has some splendid pictures and in its coffee table format is well worth the asking price". A review in the Herald Sun was critical: "Too Late To Stop Now is more suited to the coffee table than a library shelf. It is browsing material, fleshed with snapshots, album covers, PR shots, posters and prints. The words are mere stitches, there to hold the pictures in place." The Herald Sun noted that the author left out critical quotes from individuals that knew Van Morrison, and questioned Turner's objectivity.

== See also ==
- Van Morrison: No Surrender
