= Garry Sherman =

American musician

- Born: December 28, 1933 (age 92); Brooklyn, New York, U.S.
- Occupations: Musician; arranger; composer; sports podiatrist
- Years active: 1950s–present

Garry Sherman (born December 28, 1933) is an American musician, arranger, composer and orchestrator, who was involved from the 1960s in many hit records as well as Broadway shows, film soundtracks and advertising campaigns. He has also maintained a successful parallel career as a sports podiatrist.

== Early life ==
Born in Brooklyn, Sherman started playing piano at the age of four. He continued to develop his skills as an arranger and orchestrator while studying medicine and podiatry at Temple University, and then as an intern at Illinois College of Podiatry.

== Music career ==
After setting up a podiatry practice in New Jersey, he started working in the music business in the early 1960s. He arranged and played piano, accordion and celeste on the 1960 Columbia Records album Percussion Goes Dixieland, and worked in the Brill Building with writers and producers including Leiber and Stoller, for whom he arranged the Drifters' hits "Up on the Roof" and "On Broadway". Other musicians with whom he worked included Jay & the Americans ("She Cried", 1962), Solomon Burke, Frankie Avalon, Gene Pitney, Bessie Banks ("Go Now", 1964), Bobby Goldsboro, Erma Franklin, Kai Winding, Herbie Mann, Lorraine Ellison ("Stay with Me", 1966) and Tony Orlando. He also recorded under his own name for Epic Records in the mid-1960s.

Sherman had a close association with songwriter and record producer Bert Berns, for whom he was his first choice arranger. Sherman played keyboards and arranged Van Morrison's 1967 solo hit "Brown Eyed Girl", produced by Berns, and in total is credited with work on over thirty hit records.

He arranged and composed soundtracks for movies, including Midnight Cowboy (as arranger, 1969), Alice's Restaurant (music supervisor, composer and arranger, 1969) and The Heartbreak Kid (composer, 1972). He also worked on stage musicals including Purlie (music supervisor, orchestrator and choral arranger, 1972) and Amen Corner (composer, orchestrator and arranger, 1983). Sherman has also composed orchestral works, including Viet Nam Cantata, performed at The Town Hall in New York in 1970. For eighteen years, he worked as chief orchestrator on advertising campaigns for Coca-Cola, Miller Beer, and Löwenbräu, winning several Clio Awards.

He came out of musical retirement as music supervisor and arranger for Piece of My Heart: The Bert Berns Story, in 2014.

== Podiatry ==
Sherman left his musical career in the 1980s and became a full-time podiatrist. He has specialized in treating athletes, developing his own techniques using computer models to examine how feet distribute weight in different sports. He was team physician for Billie Jean King's team in World Team Tennis, the New Jersey Stars, and was a researcher for U.S. Figure Skating at the Olympic Training Center. He is also Biomechanical Sports Podiatrist at Rutgers University.

He continues to operate a sports podiatry practice based in Cedar Knolls, New Jersey.
