= Spanish Rose =

- Netherlands single cover

Single by Van Morrison

from the album Blowin' Your Mind!
- B-side: "Midnight Special" (US) "Who Drove the Red Sportscar?" (Netherlands)
- Released: 1968
- Recorded: 29 March 1967
- Studio: A & R, New York City
- Genre: Pop rock, Latin rock
- Length: 3:09
- Label: Bang (US)
- Songwriter(s): Van Morrison
- Producer(s): Bert Berns

Van Morrison singles chronology
"Ro Ro Rosey" (1967)	"Spanish Rose" (1968)	"Come Running" (1970)

"Spanish Rose" is a song written by Van Morrison that was written and recorded for Bang Records owner and producer Bert Berns and released on his 1967 album Blowin' Your Mind! and several subsequent compilation albums. It was also released as one of the follow-up singles to "Brown Eyed Girl" and reached #18 in the Netherlands.

== Writing and recording ==
"Spanish Rose" was written and recorded for Bang Records owner and producer Bert Berns on 29 March 1967. Morrison and Berns clashed during these sessions as Berns wanted Morrison to record more commercial music resembling Brill Building hits like "Spanish Rose" while Morrison wanted to record more challenging music like "T.B. Sheets."

== Music and lyrics ==
Several commentators have described the song as having a Spanish or Latin music feel. More specifically, music critic Johnny Rogan describes it as having a flamenco style. The song incorporates Spanish guitar, marimbas and a "two-step Latin rhythm." Allmusic critic Matthew Greenwald notes similarities to "Brown Eyed Girl" in that "Spanish Rose" also uses a three chord melody and lyrics that present a "remembrance of romance past, including names, times, and locations." Morrison biographer Peter Mills sees a resemblance to Ben E. King's hit single written by Brill Building composer Jerry Leiber and Phil Spector, "Spanish Harlem."

== Reception ==
Greenwald assessed "Spanish Rose" as being possibly Morrison's last safe, commercial AM radio-style song before moving on to the more FM radio-oriented material that he became known for. Record World called it "great stuff." Rolling Stone Album Guide contributor Paul Evans stated that while "Spanish Rose" is not as memorable as "Brown Eyed Girl," it has a "catchy perfection that most bands never achieve." In his review of Blowin' Your Mind! in 1995, Entertainment Weekly critic Bob Cannon stated that "Spanish Rose" had "held up better than the album’s tie-dyed title." On the other hand, Morrison biographer Erik Hage regarded the song as being "downright poor."

"Spanish Rose" was re-released as a single in 1971 and reached #18 on the charts in the Netherlands. It has also been re-released on several Morrison compilation albums, including The Essential Van Morrison in 2015 as well as many compilations covering the Bang Records sessions.
