= Steve Turner (writer) =

British writer

- Born: Napton, Warwickshire
- Citizenship: English
- Occupations: journalist, biographer, poet

Steve Turner is an English music journalist, biographer, and poet, who grew up in Daventry, Northamptonshire, England.

== Career ==
Turner's first published article was in the Beatles Monthly in 1969. His career as a journalist began as features editor of Beat Instrumental, where he interviewed many of the prominent rock musicians of the 1970s. He subsequently freelanced for music magazines such as Melody Maker, NME and Rolling Stone.

During the 1980s, he wrote extensively for British newspapers and magazines on a range of subjects as well as produced his study of the relationship between rock music and religion, Hungry For Heaven, and co-authored U2: Rattle & Hum, the book of the eponymous 1988 film. In the 1990s, he began devoting himself to full-length books. The first was a best-selling biography of British music star Cliff Richard, Cliff Richard: The Biography (1993), which stayed on the Sunday Times bestseller list for six weeks.

He has also written a number of poetry books for both adults and children. The first of his books for children was The Day I Fell Down The Toilet. His other poetry collections for children are: Dad, You're Not Funny, The Moon Has Got His Pants On, I Was Only Asking and Don't Take Your Elephant To School. His published poetry books for adults are: Tonight We Will Fake Love, Nice and Nasty, Up To Date, The King of Twist and Poems.

== Personal life ==
Turner lives in London with his wife and two children.

== Books ==
- U2 Rattle and Hum: The Book of the Making of the Movie (1988)
- Hungry for Heaven: Rock and Roll and the Search for Redemption (1988)
- Van Morrison: Too Late to Stop Now (1993)
- Cliff Richard: The Biography (1993)
- A Hard Day's Write: The Stories Behind Every Beatles Song (1994; updated in 1999, 2005 and 2009)
- Jack Kerouac: Angelheaded Hipster (1996)
- Trouble Man: The Life and Death of Marvin Gaye (1998)
- Imagine: A Vision for Christians in the Arts (2001)
- The Man Called Cash: The Life, Love and Faith of an American Legend (2004)
- Amazing Grace: John Newton, Slavery and the World's Most Enduring Song (2005)
- The Gospel According to the Beatles (2006)
- An Illustrated History of Gospel (2010)
- The Band That Played On: The Extraordinary Story of the 8 Musicians Who Went Down with the Titanic (2011)
- Popcultured: Thinking Christianly About Style, Media and Entertainment (2013)
- Beatles '66: The Revolutionary Year (2016)
- Turn, Turn, Turn - Popular Songs Inspired by the Bible (2017)
- King Mod - Peter Meaden, The Who, and the creation of a British Subculture (2024)
