= Ro Ro Rosey =

- Netherlands single cover

Single by Van Morrison

from the album Blowin' Your Mind!
- B-side: "Chick-A-Boom"
- Released: 1967
- Recorded: 28 March 1967
- Studio: A & R, New York City
- Genre: Rock; folk rock; blues rock
- Length: 2:58
- Label: Bang (US)
- Songwriter: Van Morrison
- Producer: Bert Berns

Van Morrison singles chronology
| "Brown Eyed Girl" (1967) | "Ro Ro Rosey" (1967) | "Spanish Rose" (1967) |

"Ro Ro Rosey" is a song written by Van Morrison that was written and recorded for Bang Records owner and producer Bert Berns and released on his 1967 album Blowin' Your Mind!. It was also released as the follow-up single to "Brown Eyed Girl."

== Writing and recording ==
"Ro Ro Rosey" was written and recorded for Bang Records owner and producer Bert Berns on 28 March 1967 using the same musicians who recorded "Brown Eyed Girl."

== Lyrics and music ==
The subject of the lyrics of "Ro Ro Rosey" is a 16-year-old girl. Morrison biographer Clinton Heylin believes that this is the same teenage girl idealized in other Morrison 1960s songs such as "Cyprus Avenue." In this song, the singer remembers when she was "the apple of [his] eye" but can no longer see her much as she now lives "way up on the avenue of trees." When he does get a chance to see her, he becomes tongue-tied, only able to say "oh uh uh uh uh."

The music uses a three-chord structure and has a Latin music feel, similar to other songs Morrison recorded for Berns. Allmusic critic Matthew Greenwald believes that the riff imitates that of Ritchie Valens' hit single "La Bamba." Morrison biographer Erik Hage describes the song as incorporating "psychedelic fuzz guitar." Morrison also plays harmonica on the song.

== Reception ==
Billboard described the single as "an infectious folk rocker that should spiral up the charts in short order." Cash Box said that it's a "potent, funky foot-stomper" that should be "another winning item" for Morrison after the success of "Brown Eyed Girl." Record World said "A diddley beat rolls here as Van goes for another click, and he'll make it—big." Rolling Stone critic Dave Marsh described "Ro Ro Rosey" as being "remarkably erotic in the best blues tradition. On the other hand, Hage describes it as being "an unremarkable rocker brimming with sexual double entendres." Greenwald describes it as a "fun track" but states that it is obvious that Morrison was already capable of writing better ones. Music critic Johnny Rogan describes it as an "innocuous rock-blues piece."

The song was released as the follow-up single to Morrison's hit "Brown Eyed Girl." The b-side of the single was a track that was not included on Blowin' Your Mind called "Chick-A-Boom," which Morrison biographer Clinton Heylin disparaged for silly lyrics such as "I'm going away but I'm coming back/With a ginger cat/What d'ya think of that." The single version of "Ro Ro Rosey" differed from the album version by overdubbing female singers. The "Ro Ro Rosey" single did not replicate the chart success of "Brown Eyed Girl." The song has been re-released on many of Morrison's compilation albums, particularly those documenting his Bang Records recording sessions.
