= T.B. Sheets =

Song by Van Morrison

from the album Blowin' Your Mind!
- Released: 1967
- Recorded: 29 March 1967,
- Studio: A & R, New York City
- Genre: Blues
- Length: 9:44
- Label: Bang; Columbia
- Songwriter: Van Morrison
- Producer: Bert Berns

"T.B. Sheets" is a blues-influenced song written and recorded by Northern Irish singer-songwriter Van Morrison. Bang Records issued the song on his first solo album, Blowin' Your Mind! (1967). It later appeared on the Bang compilation T.B. Sheets.

== Recording ==
"T.B. Sheets" was recorded on 29 March 1967 at A & R Recording Studios In New York City with Bert Berns as the producer. Morrison had intended to record it in one take, but there were two takes recorded that day.

There is a long-standing, but perhaps apocryphal, story of Morrison's emotional state during the song's recording. Michael Ochs, in the liner notes for the 1973 album T.B. Sheets, wrote that "after 'T.B. Sheets' was recorded, the rest of the session had to be cancelled because Van broke down in tears." Likewise, according to John Collis,

Morrison could later joke about this song. "I’m writing 'T.B. Sheets Part II' now," he said in 1972. "Keeping the same riff, the same groove." However, it’s on record – though the story could be exaggerated – that after laying down this track he broke down in tears, unable to continue the session.

== Composition ==
The story as told in the song takes place in a room where a woman lies dying of tuberculosis and is visited by the story-teller, her lover. The overwhelming pain and guilt he feels leads to a desperate feeling of wanting to escape from the enclosed room smelling of death and disease.

== Critical reactions ==
The AllMusic review includes, "The listener is placed in the room. Although somewhat disturbing, it certainly describes the term realism with one bold masterful stroke".

John Collis described the song's meaning as: "First of all, the singer chides the terminally ill invalid for crying. 'It ain't natural,' he says. The woman cries all night and the observer, trapped in the death room, is embarrassed and helpless. Later in the song, the sun bouncing off a crack in the window pane 'numbs my brain' ... And then there's the crushing claustrophobia of the sickroom – 'Let me breathe,' he demands of the woman whose breath is failing, bubbling in cheesy lungs. There is a street below, a street she'll never walk in again, and he is getting desperate to be down there, to rejoin the living, because 'the cool room is a fool's room'.

Brian Hinton described the song's music: "Here is a Dickensian tale of death and decay in a big city. Organ and drums go free form, then a stately groove, fitting Van's voice like a garrote, led by nagging lead guitar. Van's harmonica hurts the ear, then he's like a terrier, lecturing his girlfriend, 'Julie,' about it not being natural her staying awake at night, dying."

A Paste review by Steve Labate commented on the theme of the song: "'T.B. Sheets' is one of the most real songs about death you’ll ever hear. As life saps steadily from the singer’s beloved, tuberculosis-ridden Julie, there is no trite drama, no nostalgic sugar coating or grand deathbed epiphany, but rather an 'Is That All There Is?' fatalism—a mild, detached, slowly-suffocating bleakness. 'The sunlight shining through the crack in the window pane numbs my brain,' Morrison moans over a skittering Hammond organ."

== Legacy ==
"T.B. Sheets" featured in the 1999 Martin Scorsese movie Bringing Out the Dead.

Ghostface Killah samples the song on his 2006 song "Greedy Bitches".

Lydia Lunch and Cypress Grove included a cover on their 2014 album A Fistful of Desert Blues. John Lee Hooker recorded the song for his 1972 album Never Get Out of These Blues Alive.
